= 2019 Coastal Carolina Chanticleers baseball team =

American college baseball season

2019 Coastal Carolina Chanticleers baseball

Sun Belt Tournament Champions Atlanta Regional 1-2
- Conference: Sun Belt Conference
- East Division
- Record: 36–26-1 (15–13 SBC)
- Head coach: Gary Gilmore (24th season)
- Assistant coaches: Kevin Schnall (16th season); Drew Thomas (13th season); Matt Schilling (12th season)
- Home stadium: Springs Brooks Stadium

2019 Sun Belt Conference baseball standings
	Conf.						Overall
Team	W		L		T	PCT	W		L		T	PCT
East Division
Georgia Southern ^{x}‍‍‍	18	–	12	–	0	.600	35	–	24	–	0	.593
Coastal Carolina ‍‍‡‍^{y}	15	–	13	–	0	.536	36	–	26	–	1	.579
South Alabama ‍‍‍	16	–	14	–	0	.533	30	–	26	–	0	.536
Troy ‍‍‍	16	–	14	–	0	.533	31	–	29	–	0	.517
Appalachian State ‍‍‍	13	–	16	–	0	.448	22	–	31	–	0	.415
Georgia State ‍‍‍	6	–	24	–	0	.200	15	–	41	–	0	.268
West Division
Texas State ^{x}‍‍‍	20	–	10	–	0	.667	36	–	20	–	0	.643
Little Rock ‍‍‍	18	–	11	–	0	.621	29	–	28	–	0	.509
Texas–Arlington ‍‍‍	17	–	12	–	0	.586	32	–	26	–	0	.552
Louisiana ‍‍‍	15	–	15	–	0	.500	28	–	31	–	0	.475
Louisiana–Monroe ‍‍‍	12	–	17	–	0	.414	27	–	31	–	0	.466
Arkansas State ‍‍‍	11	–	19	–	0	.367	26	–	29	–	0	.473
x – Division champion ‡ – Tournament champion y – Invited to the NCAA tournament As of June 5, 2019; Rankings from D1Baseball

The 2019 Coastal Carolina Chanticleers baseball team represented Coastal Carolina University in the 2019 NCAA Division I baseball season. The Chanticleers played their home games at Springs Brooks Stadium and were led by twenty-fourth year head coach Gary Gilmore.

== Preseason ==
=== Sun Belt Conference Coaches Poll ===
The Sun Belt Conference Coaches Poll was released on January 30, 2019 and the Chanticleers were picked to finish first in the East Division with 72 votes and first overall in the conference with 12 votes.

Coaches poll (East)
Predicted finish	Team	Votes (1st place)
1	Coastal Carolina	72 (12)
2	South Alabama	52
3	Troy	48
4	Georgia Southern	43
5	Georgia State	24
6	Appalachian State	13

== Schedule ==
Legend
	Coastal Carolina win
	Coastal Carolina loss
	Tie
**Bold**	Coastal Carolina team member

2019 Coastal Carolina Chanticleers baseball game log
Regular season (36–26–1)

February (7-2)
Date	Opponent	Rank	Site/stadium	Score	Win	Loss	Save	Attendance	Overall record	SBC record
Brittain Resorts Invitational
Feb. 15	VCU		Springs Brooks Stadium • Conway, SC	**W** 10-8	**Eardensohn** (1-0)	Dum	**Abney** (1)	2,507	1-0	
Feb. 16	Maryland		Springs Brooks Stadium • Conway, SC	**W** 7-2	**Veneziano** (1-0)	Thompson		1,611	2-0	
Feb. 17	Campbell		Springs Brooks Stadium • Conway, SC	**W** 11-2	**Kitchen** (1-0)	Westlake		1,308	3-0	
Feb. 19	UNCW		Brooks Field • Wilmington, NC	**W** 10-5	**Kobos** (1-0)	Walke	**Abney** (2)	754	4-0	
Brittain Resorts Baseball at the Beach
Feb. 22; DH	Michigan State		Springs Brooks Stadium • Conway, SC	**W** 13-0	**McCambley** (1-0)	Erla		1,309	5-0	
Feb. 22; DH	Michigan State		Springs Brooks Stadium • Conway, SC	**W** 12-5	**Kitchen** (2-0)	Heikkinen		1,309	6-0	
Feb. 23	Kent State		Springs Brooks Stadium • Conway, SC	**W** 8-2	**Veneziano** (2-0)	Matthews		1,257	7-0	
Feb. 24	NC State		Springs Brooks Stadium • Conway, SC	**L** 6-7; 11 Inn.	Klyman	**Kobos** (1-1)		2,277	7-1	
Feb. 27	College of Charleston		CofC Baseball Stadium at Patriots Point • Charleston, SC	**L** 5-8	Cook	**Holmes** (0-1)	Ocker	550	7-2	

March (13–6–1)
Date	Opponent	Rank	Site/stadium	Score	Win	Loss	Save	Attendance	Overall record	SBC record
Mar. 1	#25 Illinois		Springs Brooks Stadium • Conway, SC	**W** 11-3	**McCambley** (2-0)	Fisher		1,194	8-2	
Mar. 2	UConn		Springs Brooks Stadium • Conway, SC	**W** 10-7	**Eardensohn** (2-0)	Wang		1,657	9-2	
Mar. 3	Indiana		Springs Brooks Stadium • Conway, SC	**W** 6-5	**Damron** (1-0)	Sloan		1,613	10-2	
Mar. 5	Wake Forest		Springs Brooks Stadium • Conway, SC	**W** 10-9; 12 Inn.	**Gentry** (1-0)	Fleming		1,293	11-2	
Mar. 6	Wake Forest		Springs Brooks Stadium • Conway, SC	**W** 14-8	**Holmes** (1-1)	Witt		1,352	12-2	
Seattle Baseball Showcase
Mar. 8	San Diego		T-Mobile Park • Seattle, WA	**L** 5-8; 8 Inn.	Owen	**Abney** (0-1)	Dolak	1,250	12-3	
Mar. 9	Washington		T-Mobile Park • Seattle, WA	**W** 5-2	**Kitchen** (3-0)	Jones	**Causey** (1)	750	13-3	
Mar. 10	#1 Oregon State		T-Mobile Park • Seattle, WA	**T** 4-4; 11 Inn.	None	None		3,000	13-3-1	
Mar. 13	#18 Clemson		Doug Kingsmore Stadium • Clemson, SC	**L** 5-8	Griffith	**Kobos** (1-2)	Spiers	4,851	13-4-1	
Mar. 15	ULM		Warhawk Field • Monroe, LA	**W** 13-3	**McCambley** (3-0)	Barton		986	14-4-1	1-0
Mar. 16	ULM		Warhawk Field • Monroe, LA	**W** 14-2	**Kitchen** (4-0)	Jeans		998	15-4-1	2-0
Mar. 17	ULM		Warhawk Field • Monroe, LA	**W** 15-7	**Eardensohn** (3-0)	Sanderson		878	16-4-1	3-0
Mar. 22	Troy		Springs Brooks Stadium • Conway, SC	**W** 4-2	**McCambley** (4-0)	Thomas	**Abney** (3)	1,671	17-4-1	4-0
Mar. 23	Troy		Springs Brooks Stadium • Conway, SC	**W** 9-7	**Abney** (1-1)	Johnson		1,913	18-4-1	5-0
Mar. 24	Troy		Springs Brooks Stadium • Conway, SC	**L** 8-10	Gill	**McDaniels** (0-1)	Fultz	1,377	18-5-1	5-1
Mar. 26	UNCW		Brooks Field • Wilmington, NC	**L** 4-5	Ryan	**Abney** (1-2)		815	18-6-1	5-1
Mar. 27	UNCW		Springs Brooks Stadium • Conway, SC	**W** 9-2	**Veneziano** (3-0)	Sharpe		2,004	19-6-1	5-1
Mar. 29	Arkansas State		Springs Brooks Stadium • Conway, SC	**L** 2-4	Jackson	**McCambley** (4-1)	Jumper	1,378	19-7-1	5-2
Mar. 30; DH	Arkansas State		Springs Brooks Stadium • Conway, SC	**W** 6-0	**Kitchen** (5-0)	Coates		1,378	20-7-1	6-2
Mar. 30; DH	Arkansas State		Springs Brooks Stadium • Conway, SC	**L** 3-7	Alberius	**McDaniels** (0-2)	Jumper	1,678	20-8-1	6-3

April (6–10)
Date	Opponent	Rank	Site/stadium	Score	Win	Loss	Save	Attendance	Overall record	SBC record
Apr. 2	Illinois		Illinois Field • Champaign, IL	**L** 2-4	Harris	**Veneziano** (3-1)	Acton	701	20-9-1	6-3
Apr. 3	Illinois		Illinois Field • Champaign, IL	**L** 1-4	Schmitt	**Abney** (1-3)	Acton	687	20-10-1	6-3
Apr. 6 DH	South Alabama		Eddie Stanky Field • Mobile, AL	**W** 9-4	**Eardensohn** (4-0)	DeSantis		1,213	21-10-1	7-3
Apr. 6 DH	South Alabama		Eddie Stanky Field • Mobile, AL	**L** 4-8	Cheatwood	**Kitchen** (5-1)	Greene	1,213	21-11-1	7-4
Apr. 7	South Alabama		Eddie Stanky Field • Mobile, AL	**W** 14-5	**Veneziano** (4-1)	Yarborough		1,232	22-11-1	8-4
Apr. 10	#2 NC State		Doak Field • Raleigh, NC	**W** 7-6	**Damron** (2-0)	Klyman	**Eardensohn** (1)	3,048	23-11-1	8-4
Apr. 12; DH	Little Rock		Gary Hogan Field • Little Rock, AR	**L** 5-8	Fidel	**McCambley** (4-2)		364	23-12-1	8-5
Apr. 12; DH	Little Rock		Gary Hogan Field • Little Rock, AR	**L** 0-14	Arnold	**Kitchen** (5-2)		324	21-13-1	8-6
Apr. 14	Little Rock		Gary Hogan Field • Little Rock, AR	Game Canceled						
Apr. 16	College of Charleston		Springs Brooks Stadium • Conway, SC	**L** 6-13	Williams	**Damron** (2-1)		2,746	23-14-1	8-6
Apr. 18	Georgia Southern		Springs Brooks Stadium • Conway, SC	**L** 2-9	Shuman	**Eardensohn** (4-1)		1,307	23-15-1	8-7
Apr. 20; DH	Georgia Southern		Springs Brooks Stadium • Conway, SC	**W** 9-7	**McCambley** (5-2)	Whitney		1,585	24-15-1	9-7
Apr. 20; DH	Georgia Southern		Springs Brooks Stadium • Conway, SC	**L** 12-13	Parker	**Kitchen** (5-3)	Johnson	1,585	24-16-1	9-8
Apr. 23	#15 North Carolina		Boshamer Stadium • Chapel Hill, NC	**L** 1-6	Grogan	**Parker** (0-1)		2,618	24-17-1	9-8
Apr. 26	Georgia State		Georgia State Baseball Complex • Decatur, GA	**W** 27-2	**Abney** (2-3)	Clark		372	25-17-1	10-8
Apr. 27	Georgia State		Georgia State Baseball Complex • Decatur, GA	**W** 6-5; 10 Inn.	**McCambley** (6-2)	Bell		410	26-17-1	11-8
Apr. 28	Georgia State		Georgia State Baseball Complex • Decatur, GA	**L** 11-15	Horton	**Abney** (2-4)		401	26-18-1	11-9

May (4–5)
Date	Opponent	Rank	Site/stadium	Score	Win	Loss	Save	Attendance	Overall record	SBC record
May 3	Louisiana		Springs Brooks Stadium • Conway, SC	**L** 0-10	Burk	**Veneziano** (4-2)	Perrin	1,035	26-19-1	11-10
May 4	Louisiana		Springs Brooks Stadium • Conway, SC	**L** 7-9	Schultz	**Causey** (0-1)	Cox	1,229	26-20-1	11-11
May 5	Louisiana		Springs Brooks Stadium • Conway, SC	**W** 11-9	**Kitchen** (6-3)	Horton		1,101	27-20-1	12-11
May 10	UT Arlington		Clay Gould Ballpark • Arlington, TX	**W** 8-6; 11 Inn.	**Eardensohn** (5-1)	Gross	**McCambley** (1)	588	28-20-1	13-11
May 11	UT Arlington		Clay Gould Ballpark • Arlington, TX	Game Canceled						
May 12	UT Arlington		Clay Gould Ballpark • Arlington, TX	**L** 3-6	Divis	**McCambley** (6-3)	Gross	508	28-21-1	13-12
May 14	Clemson		Springs Brooks Stadium • Conway, SC	**L** 3-14	Griffith	**McDaniels** (0-3)		3,519	28-22-1	13-12
May 16	Appalachian State		Springs Brooks Stadium • Conway, SC	**W** 19-3	**Veneziano** (5-2)	Tuthill		1,186	29-22-1	14-12
May 17	Appalachian State		Springs Brooks Stadium • Conway, SC	**L** 9-6	Bowman	**Kitchen** (6-4)		1,476	29-23-1	14-13
May 18	Appalachian State		Springs Brooks Stadium • Conway, SC	**W** 9-6	**Kobos** (2-2)	Hampton	**Gentry** (1)	1,644	30-23-1	15-13

Post-season (6–3)

SBC Tournament (5–1)
Date	Opponent	Seed/Rank	Site/stadium	Score	Win	Loss	Save	Attendance	Overall record	Tournament record
May 22	UT Arlington	4	Springs Brooks Stadium • Conway, SC	**L** 8-9; 10 Inn.	Divis	**Gentry** (1-1)		688	30-24-1	0-1
May 23	Texas State	1	Springs Brooks Stadium • Conway, SC	**W** 13-4	**Causey** (1-1)	Reich	**Parker** (1)	480	31-24-1	1-1
May 24	UT Arlington	4	Springs Brooks Stadium • Conway, SC	**W** 14-13; 10 Inn.	**Gentry** (2-1)	Bost		880	32-24-1	2-1
May 25	ULM	10	Springs Brooks Stadium • Conway, SC	**W** 26-10	**Eardensohn** (6-1)	Barton		616	33-24-1	3-1
May 25	ULM	10	Springs Brooks Stadium • Conway, SC	**W** 10-6	**Parker** (1-1)	Marsh		691	34-24-1	4-1
May 25	Georgia Southern	2	Springs Brooks Stadium • Conway, SC	**W** 9-7	**Abney** (3-4)	Maton	**Kobos** (1)	1,088	35-24-1	5-1

NCAA tournament (1–2)
Date	Opponent	(Seed)/Rank	Site/stadium	Score	Win	Loss	Save	Attendance	Overall record	Tournament record
Atlanta Regional
May 31	Auburn	2	Russ Chandler Stadium • Atlanta, GA	**L** 7-16	Anderson	**Veneziano** (5-3)		2,487	35-25-1	0-1
Jun. 1	Florida A&M	4	Russ Chandler Stadium • Atlanta, GA	**W** 9-4	**Parker** (2-1)	Hancock	**Kitchen** (1)	1,947	36-25-1	1-1
Jun. 2	Georgia Tech	1	Russ Chandler Stadium • Atlanta, GA	**L** 8-10	Hughes	**Causey** (1-2)	English	2,235	35-26-1	1-2

== Atlanta Regional ==
Atlanta Regional Teams
(1) Georgia Tech Yellow Jackets	(2) Auburn Tigers	(3) Coastal Carolina Chanticleers	(4) Florida A&M Rattlers

First round
1	Georgia Tech	13
4	Florida A&M	2
3	Coastal Carolina	7
2	Auburn	16
Lower round 1
4	Florida A&M	4
3	Coastal Carolina	9

Semi-finals
1	Georgia Tech	5
3	Auburn	6
Lower final
3	Coastal Carolina	8
1	Georgia Tech	10

Finals
2	Auburn	4
1	Georgia Tech	1

== Rankings ==
Ranking movements Legend: ██ Increase in ranking ██ Decrease in ranking — = Not ranked
	Week																		
Poll	Pre	1	2	3	4	5	6	7	8	9	10	11	12	13	14	15	16	17	Final
Coaches'	22	22*	22*	16	16	16	14	20	—	—	—	—	—	—	—	—	—	—	—
Baseball America	23	23	21	19	19	19	20	25	—	—	—	—	—	—	—	—	—	—	—
Collegiate Baseball^	12	10	11	12	11	11	10	18	25	—	—	—	—	—	—	—	—	—	—
NCBWA†	22	19	19	17	16	18	16	23	26	—	—	—	—	—	—	—	—	—	—
D1Baseball	21	21	20	17	16	17	12	19	25	—	—	—	—	—	—	—	—	—	—

^ Collegiate Baseball ranked 40 teams in their preseason poll, but only ranked 30 teams weekly during the season.
† NCBWA ranks 30 teams in their preseason poll, but only ranks 25 teams weekly during the season.
* A new poll was not released for this week, so for comparison purposes, the previous week's ranking is inserted in this week's slot.
