= 2019 Louisiana Ragin' Cajuns baseball team =

American college baseball season

2019 Louisiana Ragin' Cajuns baseball
- Conference: Sun Belt Conference
- West Division
- Record: 28-31 (15-15 SBC)
- Head coach: Tony Robichaux (25th season)
- Assistant coaches: Anthony Babineaux; Jeremy Talbert
- Home stadium: M. L. Tigue Moore Field at Russo Park

2019 Sun Belt Conference baseball standings
	Conf.						Overall
Team	W		L		T	PCT	W		L		T	PCT
East Division
Georgia Southern ^{x}‍‍‍	18	–	12	–	0	.600	35	–	24	–	0	.593
Coastal Carolina ‍‍‡‍^{y}	15	–	13	–	0	.536	36	–	26	–	1	.579
South Alabama ‍‍‍	16	–	14	–	0	.533	30	–	26	–	0	.536
Troy ‍‍‍	16	–	14	–	0	.533	31	–	29	–	0	.517
Appalachian State ‍‍‍	13	–	16	–	0	.448	22	–	31	–	0	.415
Georgia State ‍‍‍	6	–	24	–	0	.200	15	–	41	–	0	.268
West Division
Texas State ^{x}‍‍‍	20	–	10	–	0	.667	36	–	20	–	0	.643
Little Rock ‍‍‍	18	–	11	–	0	.621	29	–	28	–	0	.509
Texas–Arlington ‍‍‍	17	–	12	–	0	.586	32	–	26	–	0	.552
Louisiana ‍‍‍	15	–	15	–	0	.500	28	–	31	–	0	.475
Louisiana–Monroe ‍‍‍	12	–	17	–	0	.414	27	–	31	–	0	.466
Arkansas State ‍‍‍	11	–	19	–	0	.367	26	–	29	–	0	.473
x – Division champion ‡ – Tournament champion y – Invited to the NCAA tournament As of June 5, 2019; Rankings from D1Baseball

The 2019 Louisiana Ragin' Cajuns baseball team represented the University of Louisiana at Lafayette in the 2019 NCAA Division I baseball season. The Ragin' Cajuns played their home games at M. L. Tigue Moore Field at Russo Park and were led by twenty-fifth year head coach Tony Robichaux.

This season would also be their last with Robichaux at the helm of the program. This came after Robichaux’s death on July 3, 2019, after suffering from a massive heart attack. Days prior to his death, the university hosted a prayer vigil at Russo Park in which hundreds of fans attended to pray for their coach. Robichaux's funeral procession passed through campus and around the Baseball stadium on the way to his burial in Crowley, Louisiana. During opening weekend of the 2020 season, former players of Robichaux unveiled a statue dedicated to him outside of the Tigue.

== Preseason ==
=== Sun Belt Conference Coaches Poll ===
The Sun Belt Conference Coaches Poll was released on January 30, 2019. Louisiana was picked to finish first in the West Division with 71 votes and 11 first-place votes.

Coaches poll (West)
Predicted finish	Team	Votes (1st place)
1	Louisiana	71 (11)
2	Texas State	55
3	Little Rock	48 (1)
4	UT Arlington	36
5	Arkansas State	24
6	Louisiana-Monroe	18

=== Preseason All-Sun Belt team ===
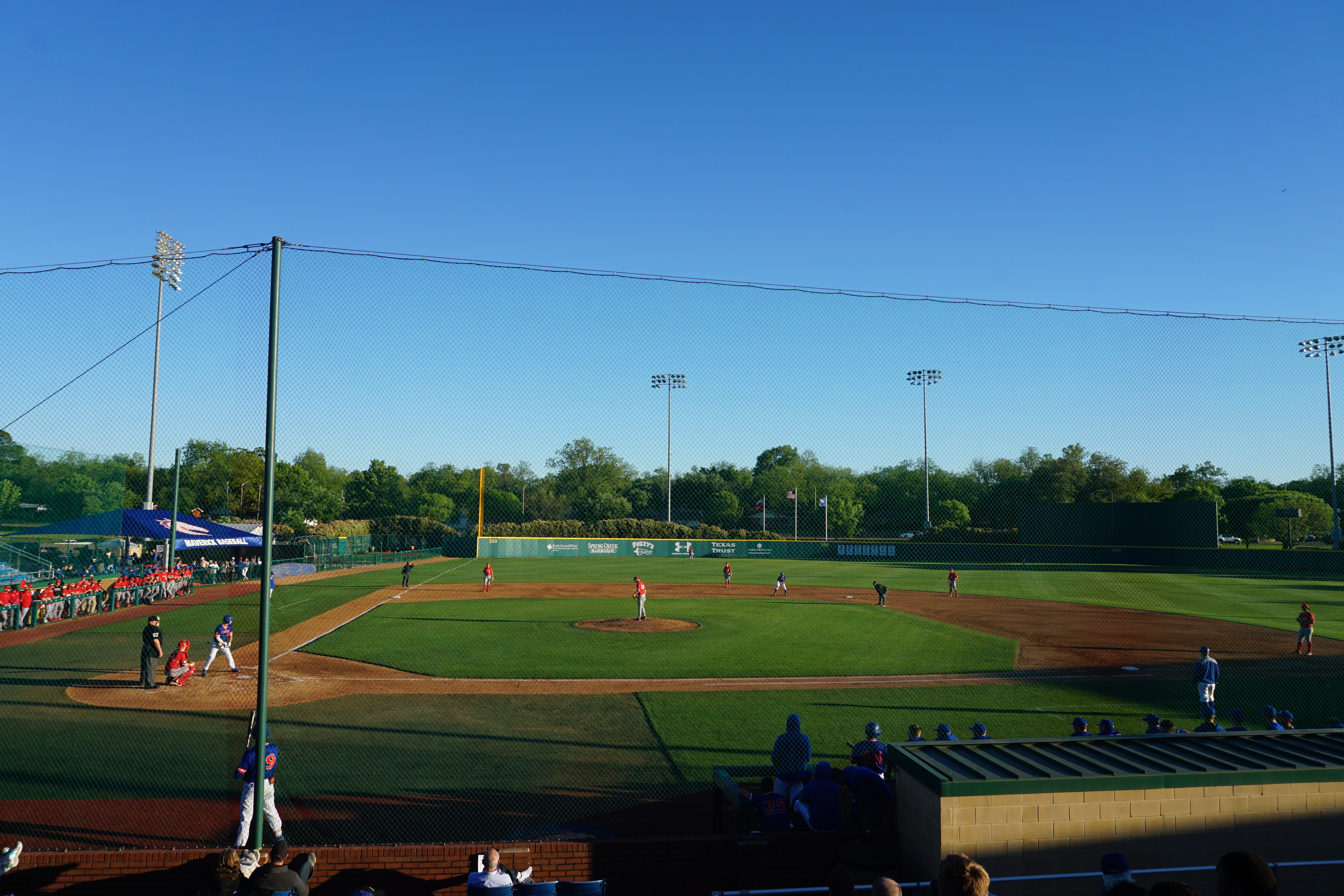
Louisiana playing at UT Arlington

- Seth Shuman (GASO, JR, Pitcher)
- Hunter Gaddis (GSU, JR, Pitcher)
- Gunner Leger (LA, SR, Pitcher)
- Matt Eardensohn (CCU, SR, Pitcher)
- Carter Perkins (USA, SR, Catcher)
- Kyle McDonald (ARST, SR, First Base)
- Corey Wood (CCU, JR, Second Base)
- Hayden Cantrelle (LA, SO, Shortstop)
- Drew Frederic (TROY, JR, Third Base)
- Parker Chavers (CCU, SO, Outfield)
- Daniel Lahare (LA, SR, Outfield)
- Rigsby Mosley (TROY, SO, Outfield)
- Ryan Glass (GSU, SO, Designated Hitter)
- Brandon Bell (GSU, SR, Utility)

== Roster ==
2019 Louisiana Ragin' Cajuns roster
Pitchers: 2 Connor Cooke - Freshman; 8 Blake Shultz - Freshman; 15 Jacob Shultz - Sophomore; 17 Gunner Leger - Senior; 16 Austin Bradford - Junior; 20 Brock Batty - Sophomore; 22 Chance Stone - Freshman; 24 Caleb Armstrong - Junior; 27 Austin Perrin - Sophomore; 28 Logan Savoy -- Sophomore; 32 Brandon Young - Junior; 34 Grant Cox - Senior; 39 Michael Leaumont - Sophomore; 40 Dalton Horton - Junior; 45 Jack Burk - Junior	Catchers: 11 Kole McKinnon - Senior; 13 Sebastian Toro - Junior; 23 Handsome Monica - Senior; Infielders: 1 Connor Dupuy - Sophomore; 5 Hayden Cantrelle - Sophomore; 7 O'Neal Lochridge - Sophomore; 12 Jonathan Windham - Sophomore; 14 Nathan Camp - Freshman; 19 Hunter Kasuls - Senior	Outfielders: 4 Brennan Breaux - Junior; 6 Jordan Wiley - Junior; 9 Todd Lott - Junior; 10 Alex Hannie - Sophomore; 18 Tremaine Spears - Junior; 21 Orynn Veillon - Senior; 26 Daniel Lahare - Senior; 30 Connor Joffrion - Freshman; 31 Adam Mitchell - Junior; 33 Colton Frank - Freshman; 41 Gavin Bourgeois - Senior

=== Coaching staff ===
2019 Louisiana Ragin' Cajuns coaching staff
- Tony Robichaux – Head Coach & Pitching Coach – 25th year
- Anthony Babineaux – Associate head coach and Director of Player and Program Development– 25th year
- Jeremy Talbot – Assistant Head Coach, and Recruiting coordinator – 5th year
- Jack Wells – Assistant Head Coach, Batting coach – 1st year
- Daniel Freeman – Volunteer Assistant Coach – 5th year
- Chris Domingue – Academic & Camp coordinator – 16th year
- Debbie Guilbeaux – Administrative Assistant
- Joey Bearb – Clubhouse Manager
- Carter Munchrath – Clubhouse Manager
- Jacob Raggio – Clubhouse Manager
- Austin Belaire – Field Manager
- Kaleb Istre – Field Manager
- Victoria Stringer – Student Assistant

== Schedule and results ==
Legend
	Louisiana win
	Louisiana loss
	Postponement
**Bold**	Louisiana team member

2019 Louisiana Ragin' Cajuns baseball game log
Regular season (27-29)

February (1-6)
Date	Opponent	Rank	Site/stadium	Score	Win	Loss	Save	TV	Attendance	Overall record	SBC record
Feb. 15	No. 23 Texas		M. L. Tigue Moore Field at Russo Park • Lafayette, LA	**L** 1-3 (10 inn)	Ivey (1-0)	**Perrin** (0-1)	Bryant (1)	CST	5,591	0-1	
Feb. 16	No. 23 Texas		M. L. Tigue Moore Field at Russo Park • Lafayette, LA	**L** 5-6	Quintanilla (1-0)	**Young** (0-1)	O'Donnell (1)	Ragin' Cajuns Digital Network	5,517	0-2	
Feb. 17	No. 23 Texas		M. L. Tigue Moore Field at Russo Park • Lafayette, LA	**W** 8-6	**Horton** (1–0)	Cobb (0-1)	**Bradford** (1)	Ragin' Cajuns Digital Network	5,119	1-2	
Feb. 20	at Louisiana Tech		J. C. Love Field at Pat Patterson Park • Ruston, LA	**L** 2-3 (10 inn)	Fincher (1-0)	**Leaumont** (0-1)	None	C-USA.TV	2,011	1-3	
Feb. 23	at Sam Houston State		Don Sanders Stadium • Huntsville, TX	**L** 5-7	Beard (1-0)	**Veillon** (0-1)	None	None		1-4	
Feb. 23	at Sam Houston State		Don Sanders Stadium • Huntsville, TX	**L** 8-9	Ausley (1-0)	**Young** (0-2)	None	None	1,026	1-5	
Feb. 24	at Sam Houston State		Don Sanders Stadium • Huntsville, TX	**L** 2-9	Demco (1-0)	**Leaumont** (0-2)	Gossett (1)	BearkatSportsNetwork on YouTube	1,217	1-6	
Feb. 26	at Southeastern Louisiana		Pat Kenelly Diamond at Alumni Field • Hammond, LA	Postponed due to inclement weather. Will play a away-and-home with SELA on April 2nd and April 3rd.							

March (12-10)
Date	Opponent	Rank	Site/stadium	Score	Win	Loss	Save	TV	Attendance	Overall record	SBC record
Mar. 1	Maryland		M. L. Tigue Moore Field at Russo Park • Lafayette, LA	**L** 2-4	Parson (2-0)	**Leger** (0-1)	Murphy (4)	Ragin' Cajuns Digital Network	4,668	1–7	
Mar. 2	Maryland		M. L. Tigue Moore Field at Russo Park • Lafayette, LA	**W** 4-3 (14 inn)	**Cooke** (1-0)	Fisher (0-1)	None	Ragin' Cajuns Digital Network	4,502	2–7	
Mar. 2	Maryland		M. L. Tigue Moore Field at Russo Park • Lafayette, LA	**W** 2-1	**B. Schultz** (1-0)	Heine (0-1)	None	Ragin' Cajuns Digital Network	4,528	3–7	
Mar. 5	at Nicholls		Ben Meyer Diamond at Ray E. Didier Field • Thibodaux, LA	**W** 3-1	**Batty** (1-0)	Andrews (0-1)	**Leaumont** (1)	None	221	4–7	
Mar. 6	at McNeese State		Joe Miller Ballpark • Lake Charles, LA	**W** 16-10	**B. Schultz** (2-0)	Reeves (1-2)	**Leaumont** (2)	None	845	5–7	
Mar. 8	Loyola Marymount		M. L. Tigue Moore Field at Russo Park • Lafayette, LA	**W** 5-0	**Leger** (1-1)	Paiva (1-2)	**Young** (1)	Ragin' Cajuns Digital Network	5,197	6–7	
Mar. 9	Loyola Marymount		M. L. Tigue Moore Field at Russo Park • Lafayette, LA	**L** 1-4	Agnew (2-1)	**Horton** (1-1)	Voelker (3)	Ragin' Cajuns Digital Network	4,803	6–8	
Mar. 10	Loyola Marymount		M. L. Tigue Moore Field at Russo Park • Lafayette, LA	**L** 3-7	Frasso (1-0)	**Perrin** (0-2)	None	Ragin Cajuns Digital Network	4,604	6–9	
Mar. 12	New Orleans		M. L. Tigue Moore Field at Russo Park • Lafayette, LA	**L** 3-10	Smith (1-1)	**B. Schultz** (2-1)	None	Ragin' Cajuns Digital Network	4,428	6–10	
Mar. 13	Southern Miss		M. L. Tigue Moore Field at Russo Park • Lafayette, LA	**W** 6-5 (12 inn)	**Stone** (0-1)	Wright (0-2)	None	CST/ESPN+	4,539	7–10	
Mar. 15	at Little Rock		Gary Hogan Field • Little Rock, AR	**L** 1-4	Fidel (1-2)	**Leger** (1-2)	None	None	194	7–11	0-1
Mar. 16	at Little Rock		Gary Hogan Field • Little Rock, AR	**W** 16-10	**Cox** (1-0)	Buck (1-2)	**Young** (2)	None		**L** 8–11	1–1
Mar. 17	at Little Rock		Gary Hogan Field • Little Rock, AR	**W** 4-2	**Perrin** (1-2)	Perez (0-2)	**B. Schultz** (1)	None	186	9–11	2–1
Mar. 19	Northwestern State		M. L. Tigue Moore Field at Russo Park • Lafayette, LA	**W** 8-3	**Cooke** (2-0)	Burke (0-1)	**Burke** (1)	CST	4,545	10–11	
Mar. 20	at Tulane		Greer Field at Turchin Stadium • New Orleans, LA	**L** 3-7	Raj (2-0)	**Batty** (1-1)	Pellerin (2)	None	2,069	10–12	
Mar. 22	Appalachian State		M. L. Tigue Moore Field at Russo Park • Lafayette, LA	**L** 5-6	Bowman (2-0)	**Leaumont** (0-3)	Papp (3)	Ragin' Cajuns Digital Network	4,779	10–13	2–2
Mar. 23	Appalachian State		M. L. Tigue Moore Field at Russo Park • Lafayette, LA	**W** 7-4	**Perrin** (2-2)	Tuthill (4-2)	**Savoy** (1)	Ragin' Cajuns Digital Network	4,634	11–13	3–2
Mar. 24	Appalachian State		M. L. Tigue Moore Field at Russo Park • Lafayette, LA	**L** 5-6	Bowman (3-0)	**Armstrong** (0-1)	None	Ragin' Cajuns Digital Network	4,555	11–14	3–3
Mar. 26	Tulane		M. L. Tigue Moore Field at Russo Park • Lafayette, LA	**W** 7-6	**Leaumont** (1-3)	Cellucci (1-2)	None	ESPN+/CST	4,624	12–14	
Mar. 29	at Troy		Riddle-Pace Field • Troy, AL	**L** 4-5	Hixon (2-1)	**Young** (0-3)	None	None	1,773	12–15	3-4
Mar. 30	at Troy		Riddle-Pace Field • Troy, AL	**L** 6-10	Gill (2-1)	**Perrin** (2-3)	None	None	2,010	12–16	3-5
Mar. 31	at Troy		Riddle-Pace Field • Troy, AL	**W** 4-3	**Cooke** (3-0)	Hixon (2-2)	**Leger** (1)	None	1,239	13–16	4-5

April (7-11)
Date	Opponent	Rank	Site/stadium	Score	Win	Loss	Save	TV	Attendance	Overall record	SBC record
April 2	Southeastern Louisiana		M. L. Tigue Moore Field at Russo Park • Lafayette, LA	**W** 8-2	**Savoy** (1-0)	Simanek (1-1)	None	ESPN+	4,496	14–16	
April 3	at Southeastern Louisiana		Pat Kenelly Diamond at Alumni Field • Hammond, LA	**W** 9-8	**B. Schultz** (3-1)	Tassin (2-1)	**Leger** (2)	None	1,355	15–16	
April 5	Arkansas State		M. L. Tigue Moore Field at Russo Park • Lafayette, LA	**L** 6-12	Jackson (5-1)	**J. Schultz** (0-1)	Jumper (2)	Ragin' Cajuns Digital Network	4,531	15–17	4–6
April 6	Arkansas State		M. L. Tigue Moore Field at Russo Park • Lafayette, LA	**W** 14-5	**Perrin** (3-3)	Coates (3-3)	None	Ragin' Cajuns Digital Network	4,752	16–17	5–6
April 6	Arkansas State		M. L. Tigue Moore Field at Russo Park • Lafayette, LA	**W** 6-1	**Young** (1-3)	Alberius (4-2)	None	Ragin' Cajuns Digital Network	4,660	17–17	6–6
April 9	Louisiana Tech		M. L. Tigue Moore Field at Russo Park • Lafayette, LA	**L** 3-11	Griffen (6-2)	**Savoy** (1-1)	Fincher (3)	ESPN+	4,532	17–18	
April 10	McNeese State		M. L. Tigue Moore Field at Russo Park • Lafayette, LA	**L** 3-6	King (4-1)	**Cox** (1-1)	None	CST	4,188	17–19	
April 12	South Alabama		M. L. Tigue Moore Field at Russo Park • Lafayette, LA	**L** 2-9	Booker (4-3)	**Perrin** (3-4)	Greene (7)	Ragin' Cajuns Digital Network	4,739	17–20	6–7
April 13	South Alabama		M. L. Tigue Moore Field at Russo Park • Lafayette, LA	**W** 8-4	**Young** (2-3)	Yarborough (2-5)	None	Ragin' Cajuns Digital Network	4,474	18–20	7–7
April 14	South Alabama		M. L. Tigue Moore Field at Russo Park • Lafayette, LA	**W** 4-1	**Burk** (1-0)	Proctor (0-4)	**J. Schultz** (2)	Ragin' Cajuns Digital Network	4,460	19–20	8–7
Wally Pontiff Classic
April 16	vs. No. 10 LSU		Shrine on Airline • Metairie, LA	**W** 6-5	**J. Schultz** (1-1)	Vietmeier (2-1)	None	CST	8,667	20–20	
April 18	at No. 29 UT Arlington		Clay Gould Ballpark • Arlington, TX	**L** 8-9	Gross (1-1)	**Leger** (1-3)	None	None	520	20–21	8–8
April 19	at No. 29 UT Arlington		Clay Gould Ballpark • Arlington, TX	**L** 3-7	Divis (3-0)	**Young** (2-4)	Gross (16)	None	770	20–22	8–9
April 20	at No. 29 UT Arlington		Clay Gould Ballpark • Arlington, TX	**L** 5-9	Moffat (4-2)	**Burk** (1-1)	None	None	613	20–23	8–10
April 23	at Southern Miss		Pete Taylor Park • Hattiesburg, MS	**L** 6-7	Stanley (4-0)	**J. Schultz** (1-2)	None	C-USA.TV	3,203	20–24	
April 26	Texas State		M. L. Tigue Moore Field at Russo Park • Lafayette, LA	**L** 9-13	Bradford (1-0)	**Young** (2-5)	Leigh (3)	CST	4,483	20–25	8–11
April 27	Texas State		M. L. Tigue Moore Field at Russo Park • Lafayette, LA	**L** 2-3	McMahon (5-4)	**Burk** (1-2)	None	Ragin' Cajuns Digital Network	4,584	20–26	8–12
April 28	Texas State		M. L. Tigue Moore Field at Russo Park • Lafayette, LA	**L** 8-10	Reich (6-1)	**Savoy** (1-2)	Theriot (3)	Ragin' Cajuns Digital Network		20–27	8–13

May (7–2)
Date	Opponent	Rank	Site/stadium	Score	Win	Loss	Save	TV	Attendance	Overall record	SBC record
May 3	at Coastal Carolina		Springs Brooks Stadium • Conway, SC	**W** 10-0	**Burk** (2-2)	Veneziano (4-2)	**Perrin** (1)	Chanticleer Sports Network	1,035	21–27	9-13
May 4	at Coastal Carolina		Springs Brooks Stadium • Conway, SC	**W** 9-7	**J. Schultz** (2-2)	Causey (0-1)	**Cox** (1)	Chanticleer Sports Network	1,229	22–27	10–13
May 5	at Coastal Carolina		Springs Brooks Stadium • Conway, SC	**L** 9-11	Kitchen (6-3)	**Horton** (1-2)	None	Chanticleer Sports Network	1,101	22–28	10–14
May 10	Georgia State		M. L. Tigue Moore Field at Russo Park • Lafayette, LA	**W** 2-0	**Burk** (3-2)	Gaddis (1-7)	**Perrin** (2)	ESPN+	4,452	23–28	11–14
May 11	Georgia State		M. L. Tigue Moore Field at Russo Park • Lafayette, LA	**W** 16-6	**Young** (3-5)	Koch (0-4)	None	Ragin' Cajuns Digital Network	4,542	24–28	12–14
May 12	Georgia State		M. L. Tigue Moore Field at Russo Park • Lafayette, LA	**W** 11-5	**Armstrong** (1-1)	Watson (6-4)	**Leger** (3)	CST	4,432	25–28	13–14
May 16	at Louisiana-Monroe		Warhawk Field • Monroe, LA	**L** 3-6	Jeans (4-8)	**Perrin**	None	None	1,002	25–29	13–15
May 17	at Louisiana-Monroe		Warhawk Field • Monroe, LA	**W** 13-9 (10 inn)	**Leaumont** (2-3)	Deeds (2-2)	None	None	1,096	26–29	14–15
May 18	at Louisiana-Monroe		Warhawk Field • Monroe, LA	**W** 19-8 (7 inn)	**Savoy** (2-2)	Sanderson (3-4)	None	None	1,082	27–29	15–15

Postseason (1–2)

SBC Tournament (1–2)
Date	Opponent	Seed/Rank	Site/stadium	Score	Win	Loss	Save	TV	Attendance	Overall record	SBC record
May 21	vs. (9) Appalachian State (Play-In Round)	(8)	Springs Brooks Stadium • Conway, SC	**W** 6-2	**Perrin** (4-5)	Bowman (6-2)	None	ESPN+	309	28–29	
May 22	vs. (2) Georgia Southern (first round)	(8)	Springs Brooks Stadium • Conway, SC	**L** 5-6 (13 inn)	Collins (4-1)	**J. Schultz** (2-3)	None	ESPN+	298	28-30	
May 23	vs. (6) Troy (Loser's Bracket First Round)	(8)	Springs Brooks Stadium • Conway, SC	**L** 7-10	Thomas (8-2)	**Savoy** (2-3)	None	ESPN+	290	28-31	

Schedule source:

*Rankings are based on the team's current ranking in the D1Baseball poll.
