= 2019 Louisiana–Monroe Warhawks baseball team =

American college baseball season

2019 Louisiana–Monroe Warhawks baseball
- Conference: Sun Belt Conference
- West Division
- Record: 23–27 (11–15 SBC)
- Head coach: Michael Federico (2nd season)
- Assistant coaches: Matt Collins; Jake Carlson; Brandon Belanger
- Home stadium: Warhawk Field

2019 Sun Belt Conference baseball standings
	Conf.						Overall
Team	W		L		T	PCT	W		L		T	PCT
East Division
Georgia Southern ^{x}‍‍‍	18	–	12	–	0	.600	35	–	24	–	0	.593
Coastal Carolina ‍‍‡‍^{y}	15	–	13	–	0	.536	36	–	26	–	1	.579
South Alabama ‍‍‍	16	–	14	–	0	.533	30	–	26	–	0	.536
Troy ‍‍‍	16	–	14	–	0	.533	31	–	29	–	0	.517
Appalachian State ‍‍‍	13	–	16	–	0	.448	22	–	31	–	0	.415
Georgia State ‍‍‍	6	–	24	–	0	.200	15	–	41	–	0	.268
West Division
Texas State ^{x}‍‍‍	20	–	10	–	0	.667	36	–	20	–	0	.643
Little Rock ‍‍‍	18	–	11	–	0	.621	29	–	28	–	0	.509
Texas–Arlington ‍‍‍	17	–	12	–	0	.586	32	–	26	–	0	.552
Louisiana ‍‍‍	15	–	15	–	0	.500	28	–	31	–	0	.475
Louisiana–Monroe ‍‍‍	12	–	17	–	0	.414	27	–	31	–	0	.466
Arkansas State ‍‍‍	11	–	19	–	0	.367	26	–	29	–	0	.473
x – Division champion ‡ – Tournament champion y – Invited to the NCAA tournament As of June 5, 2019; Rankings from D1Baseball

The 2019 Louisiana–Monroe Warhawks baseball team represented the University of Louisiana at Monroe in the 2019 NCAA Division I baseball season. The Warhawks played their home games at Warhawk Field. They were under the direction of second year head coach Michael Federico.

== Preseason ==
=== Sun Belt coaches poll ===
On January 30, 2019, the Sun Belt released their preseason coaches poll with the Warhawks predicted to finish in sixth place in the West Division.

West Division
Predicted finish	Team	Votes (1st place)
1	Louisiana–Lafayette	71 (11)
2	Texas State	55
3	Little Rock	48 (1)
4	Texas–Arlington	36
5	Arkansas State	24
6	Louisiana–Monroe	18

== Personnel ==
=== Coaching staff ===
2019 Louisiana–Monroe Warhawks coaching staff
- Michael Federico – Head Coach – 2nd year
- Matt Collins – Assistant Coach – 2nd year
- Jake Carlson – Assistant Coach/Recruiting coordinator – 1st year
- Brandon Belanger – Assistant Coach – 2nd year
- Stephen Morrison – Director of Baseball Operations – 1st year
- Kyle Vagher – Strength & Conditioning – 2nd year
- Michael Gardner – Graduate Assistant – Strength and Conditioning – 2nd year
- Justin Rohrman – Graduate Assistant – Athletic Trainer – 1st year

== Roster ==
2019 Louisiana–Monroe Warhawks roster
Pitchers: 1 Logan McDowell – Junior; 20 Richard Hebert – Senior; 21 Ty Barnes – Junior; 25 Brock Figueroa – Junior; 26 Josh Lallier – Redshirt Junior; 30 Conner Deeds – Junior; 31 Jacob Barton – Senior; 32 Tyler Lien – Junior; 34 Dylan Marsh – Junior; 35 Kayleb Sanderson – Junior; 36 Miles Dunn – Senior; 37 Landon Longsworth – Junior; 38 Kolton Childress – Senior; 40 Cole Gray – Redshirt Junior; 42 Trey Jeans – Senior; 43 Cameron Allison – Junior; 45 Cole Martin – Junior; 47 Cam Barlow – Freshman; 50 Justin Barton – Redshirt Junior; 51 E.J. Scott – Junior	Catchers: 9 Jacob Charron – Senior; 18 Austin Schmitt – Freshman; 23 Carson Klepzig – Redshirt Junior; 33 Logan Wurm – Junior; Infielders: 2 Colin Gordon – Junior; 4 Nathan Miranda – Junior; 5 Joey Jordan – Senior; 6 Masen Prososki – Junior; 10 Braedon Barrett – Redshirt Senior; 12 Brendan Jordan – Redshirt Senior; 16 Cameron Horton – Junior; 22 Blake Buckman – Junior	Outfielders: 3 Andrew Beesley – Junior; 7 Ryan Humeniuk – Junior; 11 Trent Tingelstad – Junior; 27 Jake Kaufman – Junior; 41 Kade Harper – Redshirt Senior; Utility: 19 Chad Bell – Senior

== Schedule and results ==
The 2019 ULM Warhawks baseball schedule was released on October 25, 2018. It features 28 games at Warhawk Field in Monroe, Louisiana, including a seven–game home stand in March. They will play 27 games against opponents who won 30 or more games in the 2018 season, and 13 games against teams who played in the NCAA tournament last year (Army, Coastal Carolina, LSU, Mississippi State, Northwestern State, Southern Miss and Troy). They will also travel to Pensacola, Florida during the first weekend of March to play at the Pensacola Blue Wahoos baseball park.

2019 Louisiana–Monroe Warhawks baseball game log
Regular season (23-27)

February (3–4)
Date	Opponent	Rank	Site	Score	Attendance	Overall record	SBC record
Feb. 15	at No. 1 LSU		Alex Box Stadium • Baton Rouge, LA	L 7–12	12,404	0–1	–
Feb. 16	vs. Air Force		Alex Box Stadium • Baton Rouge, LA	L 0–1	763	0–2	–
Feb. 17	vs. Army		Alex Box Stadium • Baton Rouge, LA	W 10–3	810	1–2	–
Feb. 22	SIU–Edwardsville		Warhawk Field • Monroe, LA	Canceled			
Feb. 24	SIU–Edwardsville		Warhawk Field • Monroe, LA	W 12–3	1,123	2–2	–
Feb. 24	SIU–Edwardsville		Warhawk Field • Monroe, LA	L 4–12	1,123	2–3	–
Feb. 25	SIU–Edwardsville		Warhawk Field • Monroe, LA	W 4–1	1,016	3–3	–
Feb. 26	at Northwestern State		C. C. Stroud Field • Natchitoches, LA	L 0–15	589	3–4	–

March (8–13)
Date	Opponent	Rank	Site	Score	Attendance	Overall record	SBC record
Mar. 1	vs. Tennessee		Admiral Fetterman Field • Pensacola, FL	L 2–7	557	3–5	–
Mar. 2	vs. Western Kentucky		Admiral Fetterman Field • Pensacola, FL	W 4–3	259	4–5	–
Mar. 2	vs. North Florida		Admiral Fetterman Field • Pensacola, FL	W 7–4 (7)	448	5–5	–
Mar. 5	at Southeastern Louisiana		Pat Kenelly Diamond • Hammond, LA	L 3–10	1,137	5–6	–
Mar. 6	at Southeastern Louisiana		Pat Kenelly Diamond • Hammond, LA	L 1–7	1,105	5–7	–
Mar. 8	McNeese State		Warhawk Field • Monroe, LA	L 12–13	976	5–8	–
Mar. 9	McNeese State		Warhawk Field • Monroe, LA	W 10–5	978	6–8	–
Mar. 10	McNeese State		Warhawk Field • Monroe, LA	L 2–10	1,109	6–9	–
Mar. 12	Southern		Warhawk Field • Monroe, LA	W 10–6	844	7–9	–
Mar. 15	No. 16 Coastal Carolina		Warhawk Field • Monroe, LA	L 3–13	986	7–10	0–1
Mar. 16	No. 16 Coastal Carolina		Warhawk Field • Monroe, LA	L 2–14	998	7–11	0–2
Mar. 17	No. 16 Coastal Carolina		Warhawk Field • Monroe, LA	L 7–15	878	7–12	0–3
Mar. 19	at Southern Miss		Pete Taylor Park • Hattiesburg, MS	L 4–5	3,085	7–13	–
Mar. 22	at Texas State		Bobcat Ballpark • San Marcos, TX	L 1–5	1,178	7–14	0–4
Mar. 23	at Texas State		Bobcat Ballpark • San Marcos, TX	L 5–6	1,083	7–15	0–5
Mar. 24	at Texas State		Bobcat Ballpark • San Marcos, TX	L 1–13 (7)	1,112	7–16	0–6
Mar. 26	at Louisiana Tech		J.C. Love Field • Ruston, LA	W 9–4	1,974	8–16	–
Mar. 27	Jackson State		Warhawk Field • Monroe, LA	W 10–1	816	9–16	–
Mar. 29	Georgia Southern		Warhawk Field • Monroe, LA	L 8–9	964	9–17	0–7
Mar. 30	Georgia Southern		Warhawk Field • Monroe, LA	W 4–2	964	10–17	1–7
Mar. 31	Georgia Southern		Warhawk Field • Monroe, LA	W 8–5	1,261	11–17	2–7

April (9-7)
Date	Opponent	Rank	Site	Score	Attendance	Overall record	SBC record
April 3	at No. 5 Mississippi State		Dudy Noble Field • Starkville, MS	L 8–21	7,532	11–18	–
April 5	at Georgia State		GSU Baseball Complex • Atlanta, GA	W 16–8	362	12–18	3–7
April 6	at Georgia State		GSU Baseball Complex • Atlanta, GA	W 10–3	391	13–18	4–7
April 7	at Georgia State		GSU Baseball Complex • Atlanta, GA	W 9–3	397	14–18	5–7
April 9	Northwestern State		Warhawk Field • Monroe, LA	W 8–4	813	15–18	–
April 12	at Appalachian State		Beaver Field • Boone, NC	L 2-3	209	15–19	5–8
April 13	at Appalachian State		Beaver Field • Boone, NC	L 8-10	184	15–20	5–9
April 14	at Appalachian State		Beaver Field • Boone, NC	Game cancelled due to persistent rains in Boone.			
April 16	#21 Louisiana Tech		Warhawk Field • Monroe, LA	L 0-5	1,859	15–21	5–10
April 18	Little Rock		Warhawk Field • Monroe, LA	W 5-2	906	16–21	6–10
April 20	Little Rock		Warhawk Field • Monroe, LA	L 3-7	952	16–22	6–11
April 20	Little Rock		Warhawk Field • Monroe, LA	L 2-4	952	16–23	6–12
April 23	at Southern		Lee–Hines Field • Baton Rouge, LA	W 5-4	128	17–23	–
April 26	at Arkansas State		Kell Field • Jonesboro, AR	W 11-4	802	18–23	7–12
April 27	at Arkansas State		Kell Field • Jonesboro, AR	L 3-4 (12 inn)	411	18–24	7–13
April 28	at Arkansas State		Kell Field • Jonesboro, AR	W 4-2	291	19–24	8–13
April 30	Alcorn State		Warhawk Field • Monroe, LA	W 11-4	801	20–24	–

May (3-3)
Date	Opponent	Rank	Site	Score	Attendance	Overall record	SBC record
May 3	UT–Arlington		Warhawk Field • Monroe, LA	L 2-10		20–25	8–14
May 4	UT–Arlington		Warhawk Field • Monroe, LA	W 8-0	912	21–25	9–14
May 5	UT–Arlington		Warhawk Field • Monroe, LA	W 6-3	817	22–25	10–14
May 10	at Troy		Riddle-Pace Field • Troy, AL	L 4-15	1,623	22–26	10–15
May 11	at Troy		Riddle-Pace Field • Troy, AL	L 4-10	1,352	22–27	10–16
May 11	at Troy		Riddle-Pace Field • Troy, AL	W 14-6	1,471	23–27	11–16
May 14	Northwestern State		Warhawk Field • Monroe, LA	Game cancelled due to unknown circumstances			
May 16	Louisiana		Warhawk Field • Monroe, LA			–	–
May 17	Louisiana		Warhawk Field • Monroe, LA			–	–
May 18	Louisiana		Warhawk Field • Monroe, LA			–	–

- Rankings are based on the team's current ranking in the Collegiate Baseball poll.
