= 2019 Sun Belt Conference baseball tournament =

- Teams: 10
- Format: Double-elimination
- Finals site: Springs Brooks Stadium; Conway, South Carolina
- Champions: Coastal Carolina (2nd title)
- Television: ESPN+

2019 Sun Belt Conference baseball standings
	Conf.						Overall
Team	W		L		T	PCT	W		L		T	PCT
East Division
Georgia Southern ^{x}‍‍‍	18	–	12	–	0	.600	35	–	24	–	0	.593
Coastal Carolina ‍‍‡‍^{y}	15	–	13	–	0	.536	36	–	26	–	1	.579
South Alabama ‍‍‍	16	–	14	–	0	.533	30	–	26	–	0	.536
Troy ‍‍‍	16	–	14	–	0	.533	31	–	29	–	0	.517
Appalachian State ‍‍‍	13	–	16	–	0	.448	22	–	31	–	0	.415
Georgia State ‍‍‍	6	–	24	–	0	.200	15	–	41	–	0	.268
West Division
Texas State ^{x}‍‍‍	20	–	10	–	0	.667	36	–	20	–	0	.643
Little Rock ‍‍‍	18	–	11	–	0	.621	29	–	28	–	0	.509
Texas–Arlington ‍‍‍	17	–	12	–	0	.586	32	–	26	–	0	.552
Louisiana ‍‍‍	15	–	15	–	0	.500	28	–	31	–	0	.475
Louisiana–Monroe ‍‍‍	12	–	17	–	0	.414	27	–	31	–	0	.466
Arkansas State ‍‍‍	11	–	19	–	0	.367	26	–	29	–	0	.473
x – Division champion ‡ – Tournament champion y – Invited to the NCAA tournament As of June 5, 2019; Rankings from D1Baseball

The 2019 Sun Belt Conference baseball tournament was held at Springs Brooks Stadium on the campus of the Coastal Carolina University in Conway, South Carolina, from May 21 to May 26, 2019. The tournament again used a double-elimination format. The winner of the tournament earned the Sun Belt Conference's automatic bid to the 2019 NCAA Division I baseball tournament.

== Seeding ==
In a change from previous years, the top ten teams (based on conference results) from the conference earn invites to the tournament. The teams will be seeded based on conference winning percentage, with the bottom four seeds competing in a play-in round. The remaining eight teams will then play a two bracket, double-elimination tournament. The winner of each bracket will play a championship final.

== Results ==
=== Play-in round ===
Tuesday, May 21
Team	R
Louisiana–Monroe	12
South Alabama	7

Tuesday, May 21
Team	R
Appalachian State	2
Louisiana	6

=== Double-elimination round ===
First round
1	Texas State	0
10	Louisiana–Monroe	8
4	Texas–Arlington	9
5	Coastal Carolina	8^{10}
1	Texas State	4
5	Coastal Carolina	13
3	Little Rock	6
6	Troy	5
2	Georgia Southern	6
8	Louisiana	5^{13}
6	Troy	10
8	Louisiana	7

Second round
10	Louisiana–Monroe	18
4	Texas–Arlington	5
4	Texas–Arlington	13^{10}
5	Coastal Carolina	14
3	Little Rock	3
2	Georgia Southern	10
3	Little Rock	4
6	Troy	5

Semifinals
10	Louisiana–Monroe	10	6
5	Coastal Carolina	26	10
2	Georgia Southern	1	–
6	Troy	0	–

Finals
5	Coastal Carolina	9
2	Georgia Southern	7

== Conference championship ==
Sun Belt Championship
(5) Coastal Carolina Chanticleers	vs.	(2) Georgia Southern Eagles

May 25, 2019, 1:00 p.m. (EDT) at Springs Brooks Stadium in Conway, South Carolina
Team	1	2	3	4	5	6	7	8	9	R	H	E
(5) Coastal Carolina	0	0	0	3	1	4	1	0	0	9	10	1
(2) Georgia Southern	1	5	0	1	0	0	0	0	0	7	10	2
WP: Alaska Abney (3–4) LP: Hayden Harris (3–1) Sv: Scott Kobos (1); Home runs: CCAR: Kieton Rivers×2; GASO: Nolan Tressler; Noah Ledford; Attendance: 1,088
