= 2019 Georgia State Panthers baseball team =

American college baseball season

2019 Georgia State Panthers baseball
- Conference: Sun Belt Conference
- East Division
- Record: 15–41 (6–24 SBC)
- Head coach: Greg Frady (13th season)
- Home stadium: GSU Baseball Complex

2019 Sun Belt Conference baseball standings
	Conf.						Overall
Team	W		L		T	PCT	W		L		T	PCT
East Division
Georgia Southern ^{x}‍‍‍	18	–	12	–	0	.600	35	–	24	–	0	.593
Coastal Carolina ‍‍‡‍^{y}	15	–	13	–	0	.536	36	–	26	–	1	.579
South Alabama ‍‍‍	16	–	14	–	0	.533	30	–	26	–	0	.536
Troy ‍‍‍	16	–	14	–	0	.533	31	–	29	–	0	.517
Appalachian State ‍‍‍	13	–	16	–	0	.448	22	–	31	–	0	.415
Georgia State ‍‍‍	6	–	24	–	0	.200	15	–	41	–	0	.268
West Division
Texas State ^{x}‍‍‍	20	–	10	–	0	.667	36	–	20	–	0	.643
Little Rock ‍‍‍	18	–	11	–	0	.621	29	–	28	–	0	.509
Texas–Arlington ‍‍‍	17	–	12	–	0	.586	32	–	26	–	0	.552
Louisiana ‍‍‍	15	–	15	–	0	.500	28	–	31	–	0	.475
Louisiana–Monroe ‍‍‍	12	–	17	–	0	.414	27	–	31	–	0	.466
Arkansas State ‍‍‍	11	–	19	–	0	.367	26	–	29	–	0	.473
x – Division champion ‡ – Tournament champion y – Invited to the NCAA tournament As of June 5, 2019; Rankings from D1Baseball

The 2019 Georgia State Panthers baseball team represented Georgia State University in the 2019 NCAA Division I baseball season. The Panthers played their home games at the GSU Baseball Complex.

== Personnel ==
=== Roster ===
2018 Georgia State Panthers roster
Pitchers: 3 Rhett Harper – (redshirt) Senior; 4 Seth Clark – Freshman; 7 Joseph Brandon – Freshman; 14 Craig Williams – (redshirt) Senior; 15 Grant Gaspard – Freshman; 16 Griffin Bonner – Freshman; 20 Jake Rogers – Senior; 22 Hunter Gaddis – Sophomore; 23 Tyler Koch – Junior; 25 Ryan Watson – Freshman; 26 Trey Horton – Sophomore; 32 Brendon Case – Freshman; 35 Will White – (redshirt) Senior; 36 Michael Hostetler – Freshman; 39 Joah Curry – Sophomore; 40 Liam Henry – (redshirt) Senior; 44 Josh Smith – Freshman; Austin Ross – Freshman	Catchers: 8 Tanner Gallman – Sophomore; 18 Elian Merejo – Junior; 19 Will Goldberg – Sophomore; 28 Dalton Davies – Junior; Infielders: 1 Jackson Sisk – Freshman; 2 Daino Deas – (redshirt) Junior; 5 Jack Corso – Senior; 6 Kalen Puckett – Sophomore; 11 Chase Frady – Freshman; 21 Griffin Cheney – Sophomore; 29 Brandon Bell – Senior; 31 Ryan Glass – Sophomore; Israel Zackery – Senior	Outfielders: 9 Terrell Frazier – (redshirt) Sophomore; 12 Luke Leonard – (redshirt) Senior; 13 Enrique Ferrer – Senior; 24 Nick Piccapietra – (redshirt) Junior; 27 Andrew Keene – Sophomore; 44 Josh Smith – Freshman

=== Coaching staff ===
2018 Georgia State Panthers baseball coaching staff
- Greg Frady – Head coach – 13th year
- Josh Davis – Assistant coach – 2nd year
- Brock Bennett – Assistant coach – 1st year

== Schedule ==
2018 Georgia State Panthers baseball game log
Regular season
February

#	Date	Opponent	Venue	Score	Overall Record	SBC Record
1	February 15	Richmond	GSU Baseball Complex	L 6–13	0–1	–
2	February 16	West Virginia	GSU Baseball Complex	L 2–8	0–2	–
3	February 16	Illinois-Chicago	GSU Baseball Complex	W 9–5	1–2	–
4	February 22	Charleston Southern	Charleston, SC	L 2–5	1–3	–
5	February 23	Charleston Southern	Charleston, SC	W 15–6	2–3	–
6	February 23	Charleston Southern	Charleston, SC	W 7–6	3–3	–
7	February 26	Georgia Tech	Atlanta, GA	L 3–7	3–4	–
8	February 27	Georgia Tech	GSU Baseball Complex	L 0–10	3–5	–

March

#	Date	Opponent	Venue	Score	Overall Record	SBC Record
9	March 1	Samford	GSU Baseball Complex	L 2–13	3–6	–
10	March 2	Samford	GSU Baseball Complex	L 6–8	3–7	–
11	March 2	Samford	GSU Baseball Complex	L 1–2	3–8	–
12	March 5	Mercer	Macon, GA	L 11–14	3–9	–
12	March 8	ETSU	GSU Baseball Complex	W 6–5	4–9	–
13	March 9	ETSU	GSU Baseball Complex	L 2–8	4–10	–
14	March 9	Samford	GSU Baseball Complex	L 1–5	4–11	–
15	March 12	Georgia Southwestern	GSU Baseball Complex	W 9-5	5–11	–
16	March 13	Georgia	GSU Baseball Complex	L 3-6	5–12	–
17	March 15	Appalachian State	Boone, NC	W 2-0	6–12	1–0
18	March 16	Appalachian State	Boone, NC	L 3-9	6–13	1–1
19	March 17	Appalachian State	Boone, NC	W 17-6	7–13	2–1
20	March 19	Georgia	Athens, GA	L 1–11	7–14	–
21	March 22	UT Arlington	GSU Baseball Complex	L 6–14	7–15	2–2
22	March 23	UT Arlington	GSU Baseball Complex	L 3–4	7–16	2–3
23	March 24	UT Arlington	GSU Baseball Complex	L 2–4	7–17	2–4
24	March 27	Kennesaw State	GSU Baseball Complex	W 9–7	8–17	–
25	March 29	Little Rock	Little Rock, AR	L 1–9	8–18	2–5
26	March 30	Little Rock	Little Rock, AR	L 2–6	8–19	2–6
27	March 31	Little Rock	Little Rock, AR	L 2–3	8–20	2–7

April

#	Date	Opponent	Venue	Score	Overall Record	SBC Record
28	April 3	Furman	GSU Baseball Complex	W 10–8	9–20	–
29	April 5	ULM	GSU Baseball Complex	L 8-16	9–21	2–8
30	April 6	ULM	GSU Baseball Complex	L 3–10	9–22	2–9
31	April 7	ULM	GSU Baseball Complex	L 3–9	9–23	2–10
32	April 10	Mercer	GSU Baseball Complex	W 4–2	10–23	–
33	April 12	Troy	GSU Baseball Complex	L 6–10	10–24	2–11
34	April 13	Troy	GSU Baseball Complex	W 12–5	11–24	3–11
35	April 13	Troy	GSU Baseball Complex	L 5–10	11–25	3–12
36	April 16	Savannah State	GSU Baseball Complex	W 5–1	12–25	–
37	April 19	South Alabama	Mobile, AL	L 7–9	12–26	3–13
38	April 19	South Alabama	Mobile, AL	L 2–4	12–27	3–14
39	April 20	South Alabama	Mobile, AL	L 7–10	12–28	3–15
40	April 22	Kennesaw State	Kennesaw, GA	L 10–12	12–29	-
41	April 24	Furman	Greenville, SC	L 3–4 (11 inn)	12–30	–
42	April 26	Coastal Carolina	GSU Baseball Complex	L 2–27	12–31	3–16
43	April 27	Coastal Carolina	GSU Baseball Complex	L 5–6 (10 inn)	12–32	3–17
44	April 28	Coastal Carolina	GSU Baseball Complex	W 15–11	13–32	4–17

May

#	Date	Opponent	Venue	Score	Overall Record	SBC Record
45	May 4	Texas State	San Marcos, TX	L 1–5	13–33	4–18
46	May 4	Texas State	San Marcos, TX	W 3–1	14–33	5–18
47	May 5	Texas State	San Marcos, TX	L 2–12	14–34	5–19
48	May 8	Presbyterian	GSU Baseball Complex	L 4–13	14–35	–
49	May 10	Louisiana	Lafayette, LA	L 0–2	14–36	5–20
50	May 11	Louisiana	Lafayette, LA	L 6–16	14–37	5–21
51	May 12	Louisiana	Lafayette, LA	L 5–11	14–38	5–22
52	May 14	Presbyterian	Clinton, SC	L 7–11	14–39	–
53	May 16	Georgia Southern	GSU Baseball Complex	L 3–4	14–40	5–23
54	May 17	Georgia Southern	GSU Baseball Complex	L 2–7	14–41	5–24
55	May 18	Georgia Southern	GSU Baseball Complex	W 15–7	15–41	6–24
