= Chris Curry (baseball) =

American baseball player and coach (born 1977)

Current position
- Title: Head coach
- Team: Little Rock
- Conference: UAC
- Record: 303–325 (.482)

Biographical details
- Born: November 17, 1977 (age 48); Little Rock, Arkansas, U.S.

Playing career
- 1997–1998: Meridian C. C.
- 1999: Mississippi State
- 1999: Eugene Emeralds
- 2000–2001: Lansing Lugnuts
- 2000–2002: Daytona Cubs
- 2001–2002: West Tenn Diamond Jaxx
- 2002: Iowa Cubs
- 2003–2005: Norwich Navigators
- 2006: Gary SouthShore RailCats
- Position: Catcher

Coaching career (HC unless noted)
- 2007: Hendrix (asst.)
- 2008: Arkansas Tech (asst.)
- 2009–2010: Arkansas (asst.)
- 2011–2012: Meridian C. C.
- 2013–2014: Northwestern State (asst.)
- 2015–present: Little Rock

Head coaching record
- Overall: 303–325 (NCAA) (.482); 69–44 (NJCAA) (.611)
- Tournaments: Sun Belt: 2–10; OVC: 12–5; NCAA: 6–6

Accomplishments and honors

Championships
- Miss-Lou Conference Championship (2012); OVC regular season (2024); 2 OVC tournament (2025, 2026); NCAA Regional championship (2026)

Awards
- OVC Coach of the Year (2024); Miss-Lou Conference Coach of the Year (2012); Sun Belt Coach of the Year (2016)

Christopher Michael Curry (born November 11, 1977) is an American college baseball coach and former catcher. Curry is the head coach of the Little Rock Trojans baseball team.

== Amateur career ==
Curry attended Conway High School in Conway, Arkansas. Curry played for the school's varsity baseball team. The San Francisco Giants selected Curry in the 26th round of the 1996 Major League Baseball draft. He did not sign, and enrolled at Meridian Community College, to play college baseball for the Meridian Eagles baseball team.

As a freshman at Meridian, Curry was drafted by the Detroit Tigers in the 17th round, but he returned for a sophomore season at Meridian. He was again drafted by the Tigers, this time in the 48th round. He instead accepted a scholarship to Mississippi State University to play for the Mississippi State Bulldogs baseball team.

In the 1999 season as a junior, Curry hit .295, 8 home runs, 11 doubles and 51 RBIs.

== Professional career ==
Curry was drafted in the 9th round by the Chicago Cubs in the 1999 Major League Baseball draft.

Curry began his professional career with the Eugene Emeralds of the Class A Northwest League, where he batted .227 with two home runs.

== Coaching career ==
On November 7, 2008, Curry was named a volunteer assistant for the Arkansas Razorbacks baseball team. On July 17, 2010, Curry was introduced as the head coach at Meridian Community College. Curry lead Meridian to a 69–44 record as the head coach. On June 26, 2012, Curry was named the pitching coach at Northwestern State.

After two seasons at Northwestern State, Curry was named the head coach of the Little Rock Trojans baseball program. Curry lead the Trojans to a 26–26 regular season record and a third-place finish in the Sun Belt Conference in 2016, as a result, he was named the Sun Belt Conference Coach of the Year. His 2024 Trojans won the Ohio Valley Conference regular season championship, but lost in the OVC Tournament. Curry led his 2025 team to an upset victory in the OVC Tournament championship, and pushed the LSU Tigers in the Baton Rouge Regional before losing. In 2026, his Trojans finished third in the OVC regular season, and went on to win the conference tournament for the second year in a row. Curry and Little Rock also set a school record for wins in a season with 36.

== Head coaching record ==
Record table
Season	Team	Overall	Conference	Standing	Postseason
Meridian Eagles (Miss-Lou Conference) (2011–2012)
2011	Meridian	35–22			
2012	Meridian	34–22		1st	
Meridian Community College:		69–44			
Little Rock Trojans (Sun Belt Conference) (2015–2022)
2015	Little Rock	16–33	12–17	T-8th	
2016	Little Rock	26–28	17–13	T-3rd	Sun Belt Tournament
2017	Little Rock	21–34	11–18	4th (West)	Sun Belt Tournament
2018	Little Rock	28–28	15–14	3rd (West)	Sun Belt Tournament
2019	Little Rock	29–28	18–11	2nd (West)	Sun Belt Tournament
2020	Little Rock	9–8	0–0	(West)	Season canceled due to COVID-19
2021	Little Rock	21–30	11–13	T-3rd (West)	Sun Belt Tournament
2022	Little Rock	24–27	11–18	8th	
Little Rock:			95–104 (Sun Belt)		
Little Rock Trojans (Ohio Valley Conference) (2023–present)
2023	Little Rock	31–23	14–8	2nd	Ohio Valley Tournament
2024	Little Rock	32–24	19–8	1st	Ohio Valley Tournament
2025	Little Rock	27–34	8–16	8th	NCAA Regional
2026	Little Rock	39–28	16–11	4th	NCAA Super Regional
Little Rock:		303–325	57–43 (OVC)		
Total:		303–325			
National champion Postseason invitational champion Conference regular season champion Conference regular season and conference tournament champion Division regular season champion Division regular season and conference tournament champion Conference tournament champion

== See also ==
- List of current NCAA Division I baseball coaches
