= Bobby Pierce (baseball coach, born 1959) =

American baseball coach and outfielder (born 1959)

Current position
- Title: Assistant coach
- Team: Chipola
- Conference: Panhandle

Biographical details
- Born: July 18, 1959 (age 67); Marianna, Florida, U.S.

Playing career
- 1981: Alabama
- Position: Outfield

Coaching career (HC unless noted)
- 1983–1989: Chipola
- 1990–1994: Alabama (assistant)
- 1995–2002: Alabama-Huntsville
- 2003–2016: Troy
- 2021–present: Chipola (asst)

Head coaching record
- Overall: 930–459 (college); 259–92 (junior college)
- Tournaments: 5–8 (NCAA)

Accomplishments and honors

Championships
- 2001 Gulf South Champions (UAH); 2005 Atlantic Sun Champions; 2006 Sun Belt Champions; 2011 Sun Belt Champions; 2013 Sun Belt Champions

Awards
- Alabama Baseball Coaches Hall of Fame; Wiregrass Sports Hall of Fame; Troy University Sports Hall of Fame; 2005 A-Sun Coach of the Year; 2006 Sun Belt Coach of the Year; 2011 Sun Belt Coach of the Year; 2011 South Central Region Coach of the Year (ABCA)

Bobby Pierce (born July 18, 1959) is an American baseball coach and former outfielder. He is an assistant baseball coach at Chipola Junior College. He started his coaching career at Chipola Junior College, where he coached from 1982 to 1989. He posted a 259–92 record there with five berths in the state tournament. He was later hired as an assistant coach at his alma mater, Alabama. As an assistant, he went 158–122. In 1996, he was the head baseball coach at the University of Alabama in Huntsville, where he went 276–108. He also served as the head baseball coach of the Troy Trojans (2003–2016).

Since becoming head coach of Troy in 2003, Pierce has won an Atlantic Sun Conference regular season title (2005), two Sun Belt Conference regular season titles (2006, 2011), and one Sun Belt Conference tournament title (2006). He has coached Troy to multiple winning seasons, including three 40+ win seasons. Pierce has also led his program to four NCAA Regionals (2006, 2007, 2011, 2013) since becoming head coach.

In 2010, Pierce was inducted into the Alabama Baseball Coaches Hall of Fame.

== Head coaching records ==
Below is a table of Pierce's yearly records as an NCAA Division I head baseball coach.

Record table
Season	Team	Overall	Conference	Standing	Postseason
Troy Trojans (Atlantic Sun Conference) (2003–2005)
2003	Troy State	27–27	16–17	t-7th	
2004	Troy	36–22	15–15	5th	
2005	Troy	37–21	23–7	1st	
Troy Trojans (Sun Belt Conference) (2006–2016)
2006	Troy	47–16	20–4	1st	NCAA Regional
2007	Troy	34–27	16–14	t-3rd	NCAA Regional
2008	Troy	32–26	18–12	3rd	
2009	Troy	33–21	18–10	3rd	
2010	Troy	36–25	16–14	t-6th	
2011	Troy	43–19	21–9	1st	NCAA Regional
2012	Troy	28–30	14–16	t-6th	
2013	Troy	42–20	20–10	t-1st	NCAA Regional
2014	Troy	25–32	11–18	6th	
2015	Troy	30–25	18–10	2nd	
2016	Troy	32–26	17–13	4th	
Troy:		483–339	243–169		
Total:		486–339			
National champion Postseason invitational champion Conference regular season champion Conference regular season and conference tournament champion Division regular season champion Division regular season and conference tournament champion Conference tournament champion
