= Ford Pemberton =

American baseball coach

Current position
- Title: Head coach
- Team: Louisiana–Monroe
- Conference: Sun Belt
- Record: 27–28

Biographical details
- Born: March 8, 1991 (age 35); Bossier City, Louisiana, U.S.
- Education: Louisiana State University, Arkansas State University

Coaching career (HC unless noted)
- 2014–2016: C. E. Byrd HS (assistant)
- 2018–2021: Nicholls (assistant)
- 2022–2023: Southeastern Louisiana (assistant)
- 2024–2025: Memphis (assistant)
- 2026–present: Louisiana–Monroe

Administrative career (AD unless noted)
- 2017: Nicholls (director of baseball operations)

Head coaching record
- Overall: 27–28

Ford Thomas Pemberton (born March 8, 1991) is an American baseball coach, currently serving as the head baseball coach at the University of Louisiana at Monroe. Pemberton is a native of Bossier City, Louisiana. He graduated from Haughton High School, and later went on to graduate from Louisiana State University and Arkansas State University. Pemberton served as an assistant baseball coach at Nicholls State University from 2018 to 2021, at Southeastern Louisiana University from 2022 to 2023, and at the University of Memphis from 2024 to 2025. Pemberton was named head baseball coach at the University of Louisiana at Monroe on June 11, 2025.

== Head coaching record ==
Record table
Season	Team	Overall	Conference	Standing	Postseason
Louisiana–Monroe Warhawks (Sun Belt Conference) (2026–present)
2026	Louisiana–Monroe	27–28	12–18	T-11th	
Louisiana–Monroe:		27–28	12–18		
Total:		27–28			
National champion Postseason invitational champion Conference regular season champion Conference regular season and conference tournament champion Division regular season champion Division regular season and conference tournament champion Conference tournament champion
