= Michael Federico =

American baseball coach

Current position
- Title: Director of Player Development
- Team: Louisiana Tech
- Conference: C-USA

Biographical details
- Born: Slidell, Louisiana, U.S.
- Education: University of Southern Mississippi

Playing career
- 1993–1994: Hinds CC
- 1995–1997: Southern Miss
- Position: Catcher

Coaching career (HC unless noted)
- 1998–1999: Southern Miss (GA)
- 2000: Meridian CC (assistant)
- 2001–2004: Meridian CC
- 2005–2009: Memphis (assistant)
- 2010–2017: Southern Miss (pitching coach)
- 2018–2025: Louisiana–Monroe

Administrative career (AD unless noted)
- 2026–present: Louisiana Tech (director of player development)

Head coaching record
- Overall: 171–227–1
- Tournaments: Sun Belt: 0–2

Michael Federico is an American baseball coach, and the former head baseball coach at the University of Louisiana at Monroe. Federico attended college at the University of Southern Mississippi and played on the Southern Miss Golden Eagles baseball team. Federico served as an assistant baseball coach at the University of Memphis from 2005 to 2009, and at the University of Southern Mississippi from 2010 to 2017. Federico was named head baseball coach at the University of Louisiana at Monroe on June 27, 2017. After leaving Louisiana–Monroe following the conclusion of the 2025 NCAA Division I baseball season, Federico was named Director of Player Development at Louisiana Tech University on June 16, 2025.

== Head coaching record ==
Record table
Season	Team	Overall	Conference	Standing	Postseason
Louisiana–Monroe Warhawks (Sun Belt Conference) (2018–2025)
2018	Louisiana–Monroe	23–31	10–20	6th (West)	
2019	Louisiana–Monroe	27–31	12–17	5th (West)	
2020	Louisiana–Monroe	12–5	0–0	(West)	Season canceled due to COVID-19
2021	Louisiana–Monroe	26–26	11–13	T-3rd (West)	Sun Belt Tournament
2022	Louisiana–Monroe	19–34–1	9–20–1	10th	
2023	Louisiana–Monroe	17–37	6–23	13th	
2024	Louisiana–Monroe	25–30	11–19	12th	
2025	Louisiana–Monroe	22–33	8–22	14th	
Louisiana–Monroe:		171–227–1	67–134–1		
Total:		171–227–1			
National champion Postseason invitational champion Conference regular season champion Conference regular season and conference tournament champion Division regular season champion Division regular season and conference tournament champion Conference tournament champion
