= Chase Riddle =

American baseball player and coach (1925–2011)

Biographical details
- Born: September 17, 1925; Columbus, Georgia, U.S.
- Died: June 12, 2011 (aged 85); Troy, Alabama, U.S.

Playing career
- 1944–1945: Troy State

Coaching career (HC unless noted)
- 1979–1990: Troy State

Head coaching record
- Overall: 434–149–2
- Tournaments: Gulf South: 29–11; NCAA: 36–18

Accomplishments and honors

Championships
- 5× Gulf South (1980, 1981, 1982, 1986, 1987); 2× Division II National Champions (1986, 1987)

Awards
- 5× Gulf South Coach of the Year (1980, 1981, 1982, 1986, 1987)

Charles Ludy "Chase" Riddle (September 17, 1925 – June 12, 2011) was an American baseball player, coach, manager and scout. Riddle made his mark in both professional baseball, where he had a 36-year career (1943–78), mostly with the St. Louis Cardinals organization, and in U.S. college ranks as the successful head baseball coach of Troy University (1979–90), where he won two Division II NCAA baseball championships and compiled a record of 435–149–2 (.745). His uncles Johnny and Elmer Riddle played in the Major Leagues in the 1930s and 1940s.

Riddle attended high school in his hometown of Columbus, Georgia, served in the United States Navy during World War II, and attended then-Troy State University, where he played varsity football. He broke into professional baseball as a shortstop in 1943 and spent much of his career as a catcher and first baseman, but he would eventually play every baseball position, including pitcher, during his long career in minor league baseball. Much of his early career was spent in the lower rungs of the farm system of the Boston Red Sox, and apart from 35 games with the Double-A Dallas Eagles of the Texas League in 1954 he toiled largely in the lowest levels of the minors, spending all or parts of 14 seasons at the Class C or Class D level. A 6-foot (1.8 m), 190-pound (86 kg) right-handed batter and thrower, he batted .319 with 155 home runs in 1,387 games played. In 1953, as playing manager of the Panama City Fliers of the Class D Alabama–Florida League, Riddle batted .411 and swatted 25 homers in 436 at bats.

His managing career began with unaffiliated teams in the Alabama-Florida circuit in 1951, but in 1955 he joined the Cardinals' system, managing through 1962, then shifting to a scouting job for the next 16 seasons — signing eventual Baseball Hall of Fame pitcher Steve Carlton for the Redbirds in 1964.

In 1979, he became head baseball coach of the Troy Trojans, winning Division II titles in 1986 and 1987 and five Gulf South Conference championships. The Troy University baseball stadium is named Riddle-Pace Field in his honor.

He was inducted in the Alabama Sports Hall of Fame in 2000 and the Wiregrass Sports Hall of Fame in 2005. On his death at age 85 in June 2011, The Montgomery Advertiser wrote: "In this state, there are few sports figures more revered than Riddle. Alabama had Paul 'Bear' Bryant [and] Auburn had Ralph 'Shug' Jordan, but in the baseball world, Riddle and longtime Jacksonville State coach Rudy Abbott were the two leaders whose impact transcended their sport."
