= Alabama Sports Hall of Fame =

Coordinates: 33°31′27.08″N 86°48′41.16″W

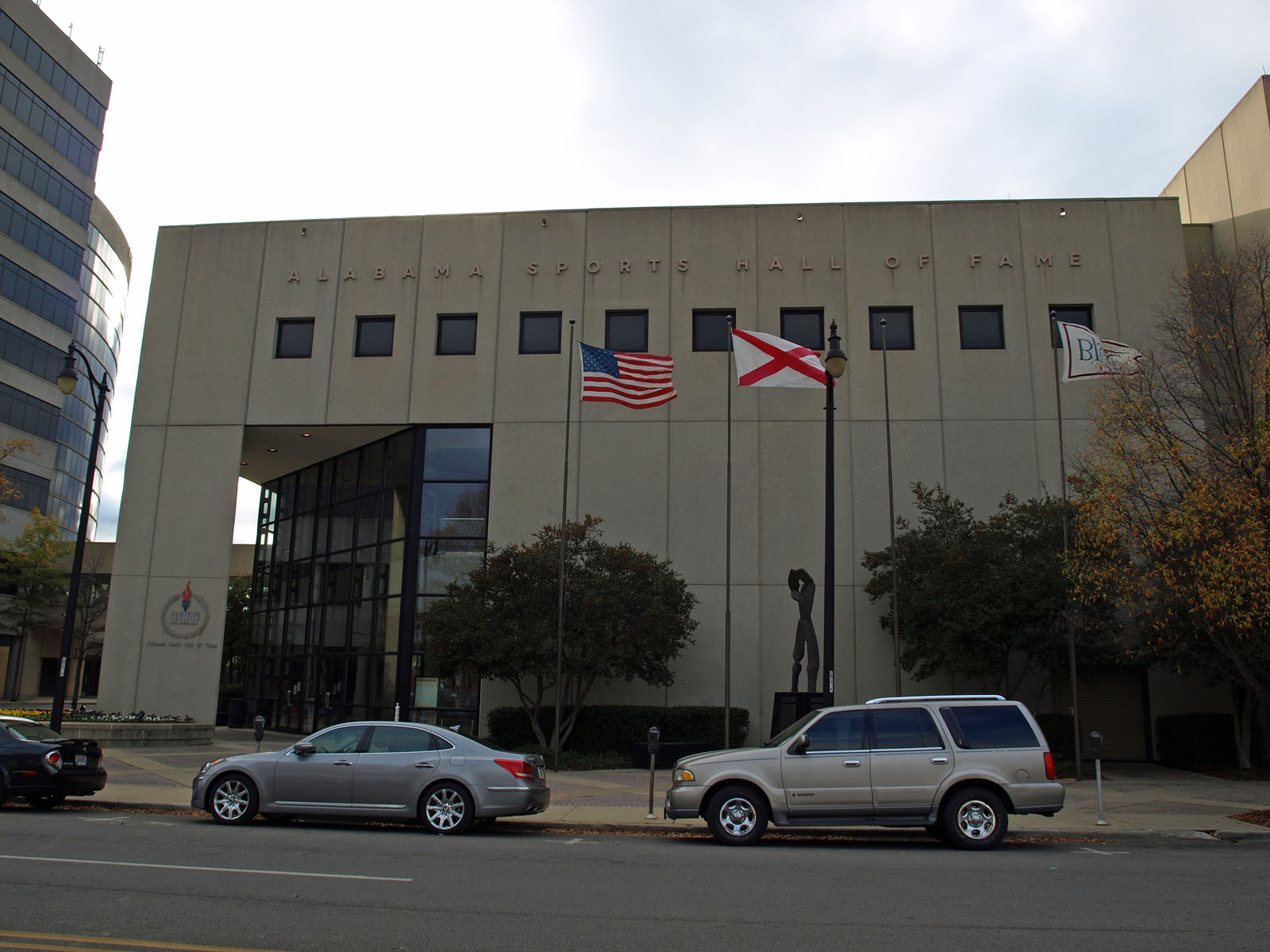
- Established: August 14, 1967
- Location: Birmingham, Alabama, United States
- Type: Sports museum
- Collection size: Over 5,000 sports-related objects
- Director: Scott Myers
- Website: ashof.org

The Alabama Sports Hall of Fame (ASHOF) is a state museum located in Birmingham, Alabama, dedicated to communicating the state’s athletic history. The museum displays over 5,000 objects related to athletes who were born in Alabama or earned fame through athletics that reflects positively upon the state, usually through excellence at an educational institution or sporting event in Alabama. The ASHOF was established by state legislative act on August 14, 1967.

== Membership ==
The ASHOF currently lists over 300 inductees, including five of the top 15 athletes selected as the greatest of the last century by ESPN. Nationally prominent members include Jesse Owens, Hank Aaron, Joe Louis, Willie Mays, Carl Lewis, Chase Riddle, Don Hutson, Shug Jordan, Howard Hill, and Paul "Bear" Bryant. A complete list can be found on the museum’s official website.

The museum has an annual induction banquet each year, where it inducts between six and eight persons who have contributed to the athletic arena in some capacity. At least two of these inductees are in the "seniors" category, which covers persons before the modern sports era.

Each year also brings a "Distinguished Sportsman" inductee. This is usually an Alabama sportsman, but may instead be a "Distinguished American Sportsman", if voted as such by the Board of Directors. Two notable examples of an American Sportsman are president George Herbert Walker Bush and Bob Hope.

== Facility ==
The ASHOF is located in a 33,000-square-foot (3,100 m^{2}) building in downtown Birmingham, adjacent to the Birmingham Jefferson Convention Complex and across an intersection from the Southeastern Conference headquarters. The current museum building was completed in 1992. The collection spans three floors of the building. The facility includes the 75 seat Bryant-Jordan Theater.

== Collection ==
Over 5,000 objects are displayed in the museum. The Heisman Trophies won by Auburn University athletes Pat Sullivan and Bo Jackson are both displayed, as is a houndstooth hat worn by University of Alabama coach “Bear” Bryant, life size dioramas, athletic equipment and historic uniforms.

== Museum leadership ==
The current executive director is Scott Myers, the former Managing Partner of the Alabama Steeldogs arena football team. Mr. Myers replaced William Legg, who helped spearhead the revitalization of the Alabama Sports Hall of Fame in 1992 with a new facility. The current museum is a showplace of sports memorabilia and is often used as an example of how an effective sports museum should be presented.

The curator responsible for the display of artifacts is Dr. Avalee Willoughby. She was recognized in 2007 with the Frank "Pig" House Award.

== See also ==
- Paul W. Bryant Museum
- Walk of Champions (University of Alabama)
