= Troy Trojans baseball =

Troy Trojans
- 2026 Troy Trojans baseball team
- Founded: 1911; 115 years ago
- Overall record: 1,865–1,184–3 (.612)
- University: Troy University
- Head coach: Skylar Meade (5th season)
- Conference: Sun Belt
- Location: Troy, Alabama
- Home stadium: Riddle-Pace Field (capacity: 2,500)
- Nickname: Trojans
- Colors: Cardinal, silver, and black

College World Series appearances
- 2026

NCAA regional champions
- 2026

NCAA tournament appearances
- 1993, 1995, 1997, 2006, 2007, 2011, 2013, 2018, 2023, 2026

Conference tournament champions
- 1980, 1981, 1982, 1986, 1987, 1990, 1995, 1997, 2006

Conference regular season champions
- 1980, 1981, 1982, 1986, 1989, 1996, 1997, 2005, 2006, 2011, 2013

The Troy Trojans baseball team is the varsity intercollegiate baseball team of Troy University, located in Troy, Alabama, United States. It competes in the NCAA Division I Sun Belt Conference. The program began play in 1911. In 1986 and 1987, Troy won Division II national championships under head coach Chase Riddle. As a Division II program, the team won ten conference titles and appeared in 14 NCAA regionals, reaching the Division II College World Series seven times and winning two championships.

As of the end of the 2020 season, the program's overall record is 1,865–1,184–3. Troy is the 34th all-time winningest baseball program among all Division 1 programs.

== History ==
=== Early history ===
Few schools in the South, especially in the state of Alabama, possess as rich a history as that of the Troy baseball program. In the past 40 years alone, Trojan baseball squads have claimed more than 1,300 victories, 14 conference championships, 7 NCAA regional crowns, and back-to-back Division II NCAA National Championships in 1986 and 1987.

As early as the turn of the 20th century, old photographs show evidence that Troy fielded an intercollegiate baseball team in the early 1900s, but school records only date back to 1931. In the teams early years, they were known as the "Teachers" since the college was primarily an educational institution for teachers. In 1931, the Troy Normal School moved all home games to what is now known as Riddle-Pace Field. The previous playing field, which was located on the quad in front of Shackelford Hall, was the original playing field. This relocation occurred because of baseballs breaking the windows of Shackelford Hall.

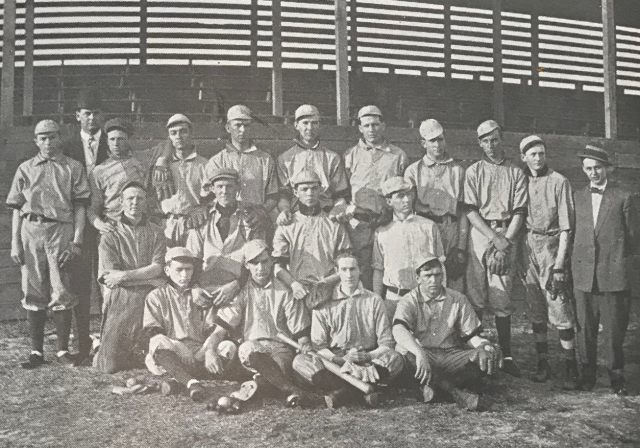
The 1912 Troy Normal School Teachers baseball team, one of the earliest photos of the Troy baseball program.

=== Chase Riddle era ===
In 1979, Troy State hired Chase Riddle, who was a manager and scout for the St. Louis Cardinals major league baseball team. In his first year as the head coach, he led the Trojans to a then-school-record 33 wins and a second place finish in the Gulf South Conference Eastern Division. That same season, Troy performed a two-game sweep of the Alabama Crimson Tide; a big accomplishment for an in-state Division II school.

In Riddle's second season at the helm, he went on to accomplish even more. His 1980 team finished the season 30–12, garnering a significant win over the then #7-ranked Florida State Seminoles by a score of 5–3. The Trojans would wind up winning the Gulf South Conference championship and the NCAA Central Regional, and making it all the way to the NCAA College World Series. They were eliminated with a 1–2 record from the World Series, but Troy had established themselves as a new powerhouse baseball program.

The 1981 and 1982 seasons were also huge successes for Riddle and his program. The program won another Gulf South Conference championship in 1981 with yet another appearance in the College World Series, finishing the season with a 37–10 record. The 1982 season saw Troy winning yet another conference championship and appearing again in the NCAA tournament. Troy would also garner big wins against Auburn and Clemson that same year.

From 1983 to 1985, the Trojans would go 105–42, making three NCAA regional appearances and two College World Series appearances.

In 1986, the Trojans defeated Columbus State, 5–0, to win their first NCAA College World Series (Division II). They finished the season as the #1-ranked team in the country, with a 46–8 overall record, and a 12–0 conference record to win another Gulf South Conference title. In 1987, they followed up with yet another national championship by defeating Tampa, 7–5. For his successes, head coach Chase Riddle was named National Head Coach of the Year by the American Baseball Coaches Association in 1986 and 1987.

Chase Riddle would wind up retiring in 1990, finishing his notable career with a record of 434–149–2. Less than one year after his retirement, Riddle's #25 jersey that he wore was retired. Riddle was inducted into the Alabama Sports Hall of Fame in 2000, the Wiregrass Sports Hall of Fame in 2005, and later into the Troy Sports Hall of Fame in 2012.

=== John Mayotte era ===
Upon transitioning from Division II to Division I, the Trojans finished their tenure in Division II with a 38–25 overall record against competition in NCAA postseason play.

In the Trojan's last season of play in Division II, coach John Mayotte helped continue the trend of Trojan baseball success, leading the team to another College World Series appearance, only to be eliminated with a 2–2 record. The Trojans finished that season ranked #3 in the nation.

After coach Mayotte helped lead Troy into their new era of Division I baseball, he led the team to their first Division I NCAA regional in 1995, just Troy's second season of being in Division I. Troy was eliminated in the Regional by Florida State and Ole Miss that season. In 1997, Mayotte once again led Troy to another NCAA regional, where Troy was again eliminated, this time by Alabama and Southern California.

=== Bobby Pierce era ===
In 2003, Troy hired Bobby Pierce as head coach. In his 4th season (2006), he led Troy to their 3rd ever appearance in an NCAA regional. In what would become one of Pierce's best seasons, his Trojans went 47–16 and won their first Sun Belt Conference championship. They entered into the Tuscaloosa Regional as the #2-seed team, while also holding a national ranking of #27 by the National Collegiate Baseball Writers Association. Troy would face #3-seed Southern Miss in the first matchup, with Troy scoring their first victory in a Regional since joining Division I, beating Southern Miss by a score of 10–8. Troy would fall to #1-seed Alabama in the next round, only to face Southern Miss and beating them yet again. Troy would finally be eliminated from the Regional by Alabama in the final game. Three players from the 2006 team were taken that year in the MLB draft: Tom King, Mike Felix, and Jarred Keel.

The Trojans went on to have a lot of success over the years since that 2006 season, finding themselves ranked in the Top 25 occasionally almost every season, yet never finishing with a national ranking. That trend would change in 2013.

The 2013 season saw Troy have one of its strongest batting lineups in the program's history. The Trojans were in the Top 10 in the NCAA in total home runs, hitting 54 that season. After getting big wins over Texas Tech and Auburn during the season, the Trojans won another Sun Belt Conference championship, going 40–18 during the regular season. Troy would be ranked #26 by Collegiate Baseball going into the Tallahassee Regional, garnering them the #3-seed. They would face Alabama in the first round, defeating the Crimson Tide 5–2, only to lose to Florida State in the next round. After being put into the elimination bracket, Troy had to once again face the Alabama Crimson Tide. The Trojans would defeat the Tide yet again, this time in a thriller by a score of 9–8. Troy faced Florida State in the finals of the Regional, but wound up being eliminated by the Seminoles, 4–11.

The Trojans would finish the 2013 season with their first ever Top 25 rankings, being ranked #23 by Collegiate Baseball and #25 by Baseball America.

Bobby Pierce finished his career with a 450–313 record at Troy, leading the program to their first Top 25 finish and 4 NCAA regional appearances. For his accomplishments, Pierce was inducted into the Alabama Baseball Coaches Hall of Fame in 2010, the Wiregrass Hall of Fame in 2017, and the Troy Sports Hall of Fame in 2018.

=== Mark Smartt era ===
After the 2016 season, long-time assistant coach Mark Smartt was hired as Troy's new head coach. Smartt is a Troy University alumnus and was a member of the Troy State Trojans baseball teams that was Division II national championships in 1986 and 1987.

In Smartt's second season at the helm, his team would go 31–25, performing a rare accomplishment by defeating every in-state on the schedule in 2017. The Trojans would defeat Alabama, Auburn, UAB, South Alabama, Alabama State, Samford, and Jacksonville State that season.

In 2018, in just Smartt's third season as head coach, he led Troy to a 2nd-place finish in the Sun Belt Conference and finished with a 42–21 record that season. The team would make it all the way to the Sun Belt Conference Tournament finals against #19 Coastal Carolina, only to lose 6–11 to the Chanticleers. Troy wound up receiving an at-large bid to the NCAA tournament, where they would face #18 Duke in the first round, defeating the Blue Devils by a score of 6–0. The Trojans' fortunes would fade from there though, losing to #9 Georgia in the next round, and finally being eliminated in a re-match with Duke. Troy finished the season with the sixth-most wins in school history, while garnering a few wins over Top 25 ranked teams, including #17 Coastal Carolina, #18 Duke, and #22 Auburn.

== Coaches ==
Years	Coach	Record
1954–1960	Paul Nix	92–45
1961–1964	Melvin Lucas	62–30
1965–1966	Billy Williams	21–19
1967–1968	Phillip Creel	21–27
1969–1970	Frank Rosado	22–21
1971	Bo Gaylard	7–14
1972	Bob Boothe	18–24
1973–1974; 1976–1978	Joe Hollis	106–75
1975	Larry Maier	14–12
1979–1990	Chase Riddle	434–149–2
1991–2002	John Mayotte	386–273–1
2003–2015	Bobby Pierce	450–313
2016–2021	Mark Smartt	168–132
2022–present	Skylar Meade	187–121

== Riddle-Pace Field ==
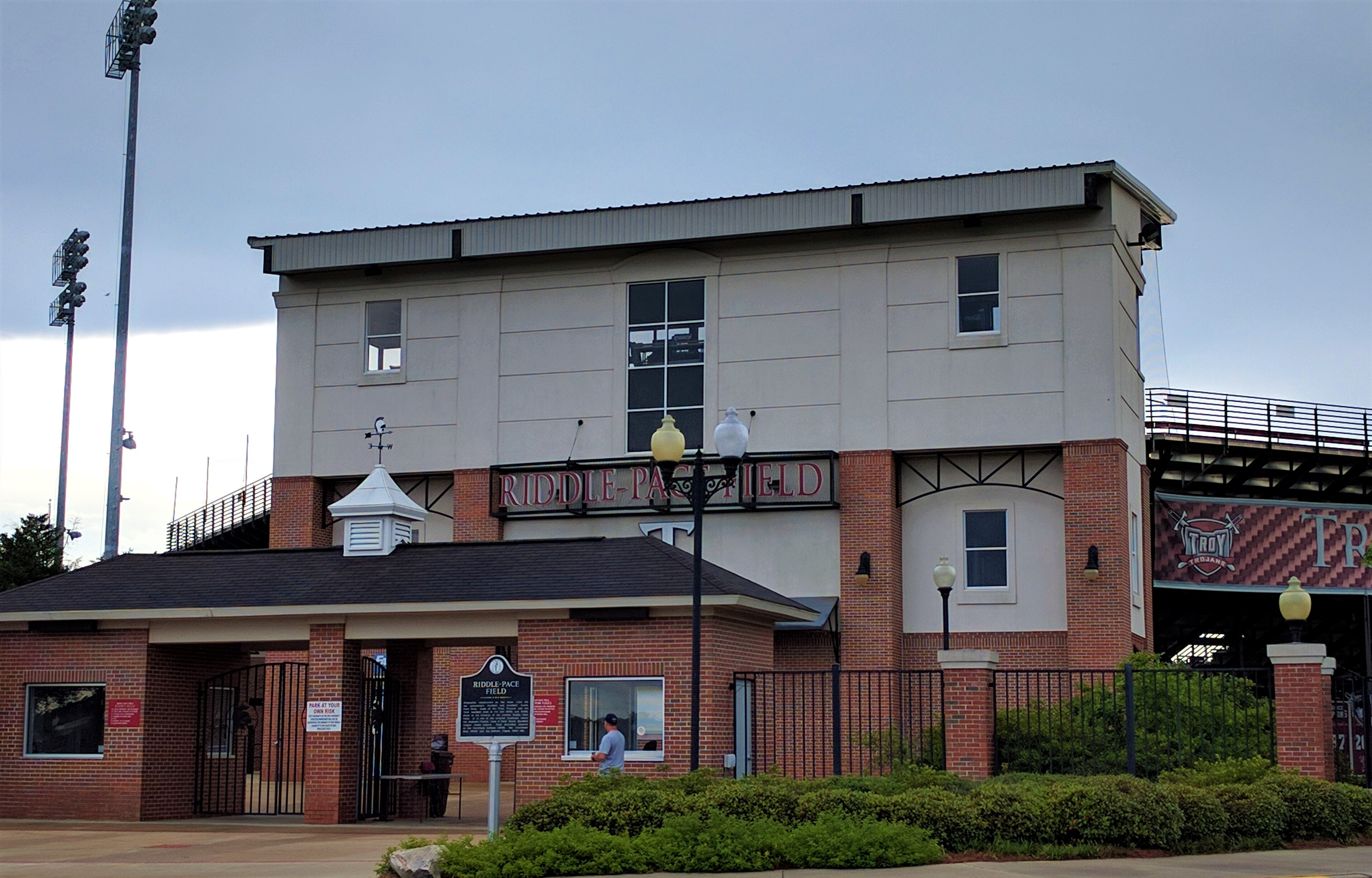
Riddle-Pace Field entrance at Troy University.

Riddle-Pace Field, located on the university's campus, is the program's home venue. It is named for Chase Riddle, former head coach of the program, and Matthew Downer Pace, who served Troy University from 1891 to 1941 as Professor of Mathematics, Dean, and President.

The stadium features a brick concourse, a three-story press box, restrooms, a concession stand, and a merchandise booth. The stadium has a capacity of 2,000 spectators, which includes 1,700 bleacher seats and 300 chair-back seats. More spectator areas are located beyond the left field fence and adjacent to the home plate dugout. The Lott Baseball Complex was built along the left field fence, which houses coaches offices, player locker rooms and lounge, and an indoor batting cage.

The field had its grass turf removed and was replaced with artificial grass turf in 2008. Troy was one of only three college baseball programs at the time to switch from grass fields to artificial turf. A state-of-the-art drainage system was installed with the new artificial turf, lending the Troy baseball team the ability to play games in a very short amount of time after heavy rains come through.

The field has become known for its "Monster" wall in right field, a 27-foot tall black wall with a built-in scoreboard and video board. It's currently one of the largest outfield walls in all of college baseball.

== Attendance ==
=== Attendance Rankings ===
Former Troy shortstop Shohei Fujita.

Troy has been ranked in the NCAA's Top 50 for annual average home attendance for multiple seasons since the early 2000s.

Year	National rank	Avg. home attendance
2026	39th	2,517
2025	37th	2,425
2024	38th	2,332
2023	43rd	1,765
2022	34th	1,948
2020	37th	1,596
2019	41st	1,545
2018	41st	1,636
2015	48th	1,185
2012	50th	1,211
2011	40th	1,282
2010	46th	1,188
2009	43rd	1,208
2008	46th	1,301
2007	42nd	1,425
2005	47th	1,130

=== Attendance Records ===
Below is a list of Troy's top six single-game attendance figures.

Attendance	Year	Opponent	Result
7,033	2026	Little Rock	W 7–2
6,426	2026	Little Rock	W 12–2
3,982	2026	Alabama	W 6–1
3,892	2025	Alabama	L 2–10
3,872	2024	Alabama	L 6–7
3,649	2018	South Alabama	L 5–8

== All-Americans ==
Troy has produced 58 All-American players, as well as 6 Academic All-Americans. Since Troy joined the NCAA's Division I in 1994, the program has had 16 players named as All-Americans.

The following is a list of all First Team All-Americans Troy has had since joining Division I:

Player	Position	Year(s)	Selectors
Nate Moore	P	2004	Baseball America
Tom King	SS	2006	Collegiate Baseball, NCBWA, Louisville Slugger
Bryan Miller	OF	2008	Collegiate Baseball
Adam Bryant	SS	2010	Ping!Baseball.com
Tyler Hannah	3B	2011	Collegiate Baseball
Danny Collins	OF	2013	Collegiate Baseball, NCBWA

== Award Winners/Finalists ==
- ABCA National Coach of the Year

Chase Riddle – 1986, 1987
John Mayotte – 1993

- Rawlings Gold Glove Award

Brett Henry – 2009
Brandon Lockridge – 2018

- Brooks Wallace Award Finalist

Adam Bryant – 2010
Tyler Vaughn – 2013

== MLB draft ==
Troy has had 61 total players selected in the MLB draft in its history. Click the "show" button at the top corner of the table below in order to see the list of Trojans that have been drafted.

Trojans in the Major League Baseball Draft
Year	Player	Round	Team
1967	Wesley Rutledge	20	St. Louis
1977	Ronnie Reasoner	28	Detroit
1978	Kenneth Gilmore	27	Cleveland
1979	Stan McCauley	26	St. Louis
1981	Danny Cox	13	St. Louis
1981	Kevin McDaniel	32	Montreal
1982	Pedro LaTorre	14	St. Louis
1985	David Banks	25	New York (AL)
1985	Ray Stephens	6	St. Louis
1985	Chuck Stanhope	6	Baltimore
1985	Buck Watford	14	Toronto
1986	Vince Kindred	7	St. Louis
1986	Mike Pérez	12	St. Louis
1986	Jody Ryan	15	Seattle
1986	Ron Warren	18	Boston
1987	Warren Arrington	17	Chicago (NL)
1987	David Bond	5	San Diego
1987	Chris Small	10	Houston
1987	Marcus Pilkinton	26	Baltimore
1987	Mike Elmore	16	Baltimore
1988	Steve Fanning	7	St. Louis
1988	James Wray	19	Los Angeles (NL)
1988	David Wuthrich	27	San Francisco
1988	Rodney Brooks	11	St. Louis
1990	James Coachman	27	Chicago (AL)
1991	Keith Black	54	St. Louis
1991	Andy Dolson	22	Toronto
1995	Rhodney Donaldson	17	Florida
1996	Duane Eason	48	Pittsburgh
1997	Ryan Pearson	43	Milwaukee
1999	Jorge Soto	3	Oakland
1999	Casey Williamson	19	Detroit
1999	Kevan Burns	26	Arizona
1999	Tom Gregorio	27	Los Angeles (AL)
2001	Casey Smith	34	Los Angeles (AL)
2001	Jason Bernard	27	Philadelphia
2004	Nate Moore	4	Kansas City
2004	Todd Nicholas	36	Montreal
2005	Adam Godwin	11	Los Angeles (NL)
2005	Henry Gutierrez	11	San Francisco
2006	Mike Felix	2	Pittsburgh
2006	Tom King	8	San Diego
2006	Jarred Keel	31	Pittsburgh
2007	Josh Dew	14	St. Louis
2007	Clint Robinson	25	Kansas City
2007	Clegg Snipes	41	Kansas City
2008	Beau Brooks	20	Anaheim
2009	Jason Walls	19	San Francisco
2009	Chris Sorce	28	Seattle
2010	Chase Whitley	15	New York (AL)
2011	Adam Bryant	9	Minnesota
2013	Danny Collins	13	Pittsburgh
2013	Logan Pierce	15	Philadelphia
2013	Trae Santos	17	San Diego
2015	Logan Hill	25	Pittsburgh
2016	Lucas Brown	34	Baltimore
2018	CJ Carter	29	Miami
2018	Brandon Lockridge	5	New York (AL)
2018	Matt Sanders	10	Seattle
2020	Levi Thomas	4	San Diego
2021	Logan Cerny	10	Philadelphia
2023	Zach Fruit	9	Baltimore
2023	William Sullivan	13	St. Louis
2024	Kole Myers	9	Los Angeles
2025	Noah Edders	15	Chicago (NL)
2025	Jay Dill	18	Athletics

== Notable alumni ==
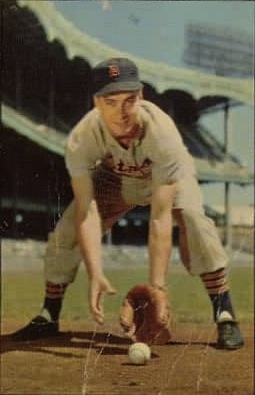
Fred "Scrap Iron" Hatfield with the Detroit Tigers in 1953.

The following players made their way onto Major League rosters from either being drafted or signed as free agents:

- Clint Robinson
- Chase Whitley
- Fred "Scrap Iron" Hatfield
- Mackey Sasser
- Danny Cox
- TJ Rivera
- Mike Rivera
- Tom Drake
- Danny Breeden
- Mike Pérez
- Ray Stephens
- Tom Gregorio
- Grady Wilson
- Brandon Lockridge

== Championships ==
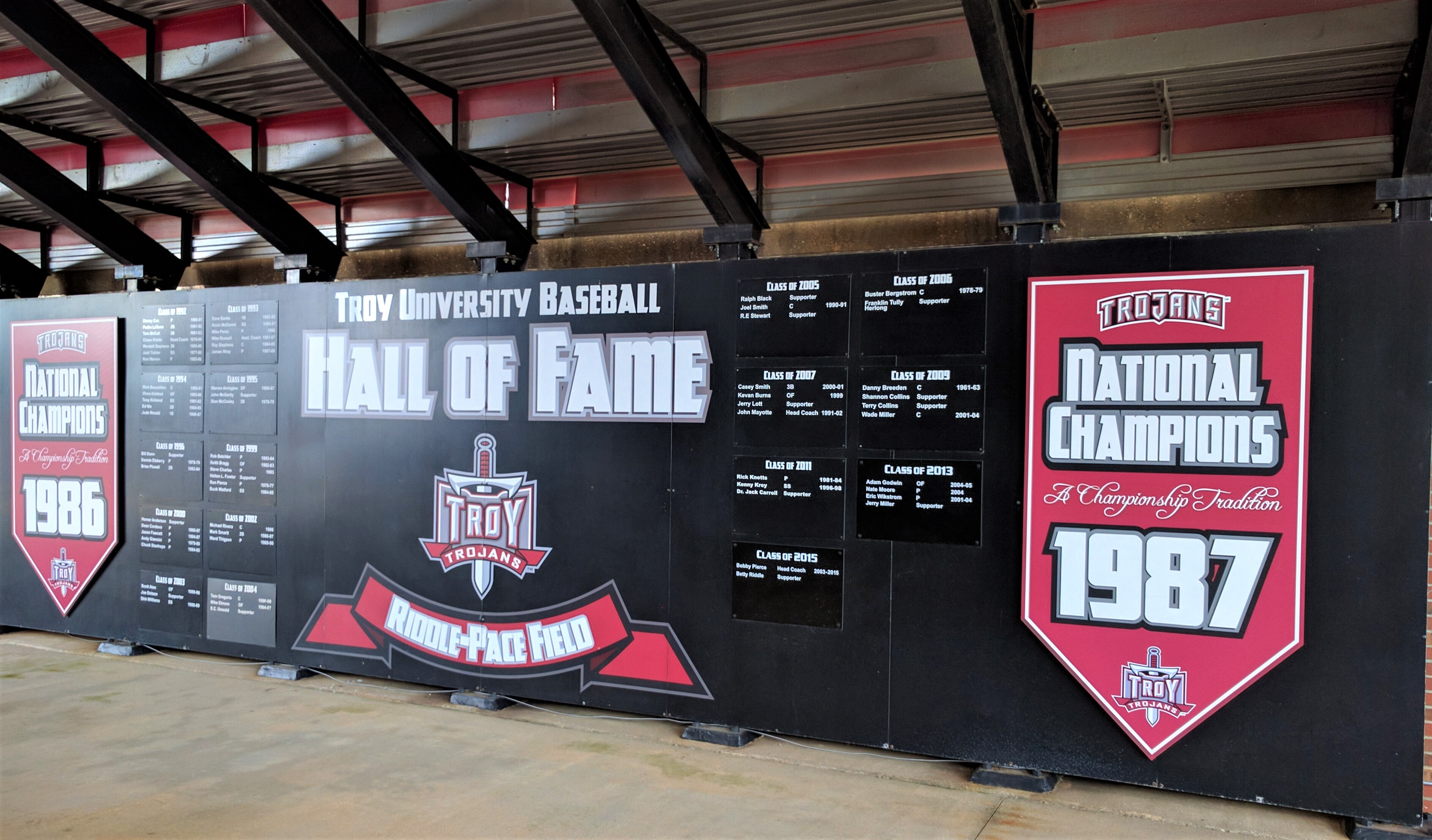
Troy's Baseball Hall of Fame & Championships wall, located in the main concourse beneath the stadium.

Since Troy's first year in Division I in 1994, the program has won six regular-season conference titles and three conference tournament titles.

In the team's short stint in the Mid-Continent Conference, they won the regular season title in three straight seasons, from 1995 to 1997, to go along with two tournament titles in 1995 and 1997. In Troy's last season in the Atlantic Sun Conference in 2005, they won the regular season title. Since joining the Sun Belt Conference, the team has won three regular season titles in 2006, 2011, and 2013. Troy also won the SBC tournament title in 2006.

The program has compiled a total of 20 conference championships and two D-II national championships since its inception.

=== Conference Season Championships ===
Year	Coach	Record	Conference title
1980	Chase Riddle	30–12 (12–2)	Gulf South Conference champions
1981	Chase Riddle	37–10 (12–0)	Gulf South Conference champions
1982	Chase Riddle	31–10 (8–3)	Gulf South Conference champions
1986	Chase Riddle	46–8 (12–0)	Gulf South Conference champions
1989	Chase Riddle	29–16 (6–8)	Gulf South Conference champions
1996	John Mayotte	41–13 (18–2)	Mid-Continent Conference champions
1997	John Mayotte	37–23 (8–6)	Mid-Continent Conference champions
2005	Bobby Pierce	37–21 (23–7)	Atlantic Sun Conference champions
2006	Bobby Pierce	47–16 (20–4)	Sun Belt Conference champions
2011	Bobby Pierce	43–19 (21–9)	Sun Belt Conference champions
2013	Bobby Pierce	42–20 (20–10)	Sun Belt Conference champions
Regular Season championships:			11

=== Conference Tournament Championships ===
Year	Coach	Record	Conference title
1980	Chase Riddle	30–12 (12–2)	Gulf South Conference champions
1981	Chase Riddle	37–10 (12–0)	Gulf South Conference champions
1982	Chase Riddle	31–10 (8–3)	Gulf South Conference champions
1986	Chase Riddle	46–8 (12–0)	Gulf South Conference champions
1987	Chase Riddle	38–10–1 (8–5)	Gulf South Conference champions
1990	Chase Riddle	50–10 (9–3)	Gulf South Conference champions
1995	John Mayotte	41–13 (18–2)	Mid-Continent Conference champions
1997	John Mayotte	37–23 (8–6)	Mid-Continent Conference champions
2006	Bobby Pierce	47–16 (20–4)	Sun Belt Conference champions
Conference Tournament championships:			9

=== Division II national championships ===
In 1986, the Trojans defeated Columbus State, 5–0, to win the Division II College World Series. In 1987, they followed up with yet another national championship by defeating Tampa, 7–5.

Then head coach Chase Riddle was named National Head Coach of the Year in 1986 and 1987 for his successes of winning two national championships in a row.

Year	Record	Postseason results	Title
1986	46–8 (12–0)	W 8–7 vs. Sam Houston State; W 13–4 vs. Jacksonville State; W 6–4 vs. Sam Houston State; W 8–6 vs. Mankato State; W 7–5 vs. New Haven; W 9–1 vs. Sacramento State; W 5–0 vs. Columbus College	NCAA Division II; National Champions
1987	38–10–1 (8–5)	W 4–0 vs. North Alabama; W 8–5 vs. SIU-Edwardsville; W 3–1 vs. SIU-Edwardsville; W 6–0 vs. Tampa; W 6–2 vs. CSU-Dominguez Hills; W 8–7 vs. Wright State; W 7–5 vs. Tampa	NCAA Division II; National Champions
National Championships:			2

== Top 25 finishes ==
Year	Record	Coaches' Poll	Perfect Game/CBN	Baseball America	D1 Baseball	NCBWA Poll
1979	33–14		#12			
1980	30–12		#4			
1981	37–10		#4			
1982	31–10		#13			
1983	23–11–1		#7			
1984	39–16		#3			
1985	43–15		#6			
1986	46–8		#1			
1987	38–10–1		#1			
1988	35–17		#14			
1989	29–16		#23			
1990	50–10		#16			
1991	34–19		#14			
1992	29–21	#24	#25			
1993	39–17	#3	#3			
2013	42–20		#23	#25		
2026	39–32	#8		#6	#8	#6

== Yearly results ==
=== Division I ===
Record table
Season	Coach	Overall	Conference	Standing	Postseason
Troy State (East Coast Conference) (1994–1994)
1994	John Mayotte	34–16	5–1	1st	
Troy State (Mid-Continent Conference) (1995–1997)
1995	John Mayotte	27–23–1	13–6	2nd (East)	NCAA Regional
1996	John Mayotte	41–13	18–2	1st (East)	
1997	John Mayotte	37–23	8–6	1st (East)	NCAA Regional
Troy State (Atlantic Sun Conference) (1998–2005)
1998	John Mayotte	37–21	13–7	1st (West)	
1999	John Mayotte	31–28	15–15	5th	
2000	John Mayotte	22–34	11–16	7th	
2001	John Mayotte	27–28	12–15	T-6th	
2002	John Mayotte	28–30	16–14	4th	
John Mayotte:		284–216–1	111–82		
2003	Bobby Pierce	27–27	16–16	T-7th	
2004	Bobby Pierce	36–22	15–15	5th	
2005	Bobby Pierce	37–21	23–7	1st	
Troy (Sun Belt Conference) (2006–Present)
2006	Bobby Pierce	47–16	20–4	1st	NCAA Regional
2007	Bobby Pierce	34–27	16–14	T-2nd	NCAA Regional
2008	Bobby Pierce	32–26	18–12	3rd	
2009	Bobby Pierce	33–23	18–10	3rd	
2010	Bobby Pierce	36–25	16–14	T-6th	
2011	Bobby Pierce	43–17	21–9	1st	NCAA Regional
2012	Bobby Pierce	28–30	14–16	T-6th	
2013	Bobby Pierce	42–20	20–10	T-1st	NCAA Regional
2014	Bobby Pierce	25–32	11–18	T-6th	
2015	Bobby Pierce	30–25	18–10	2nd	
Bobby Pierce:		450–311	226–155		
2016	Mark Smartt	32–26	17–13	T-3rd	
2017	Mark Smartt	31–24	16–14	T-4th (East)	
2018	Mark Smartt	42–21	19–11	2nd (East)	NCAA Regional
2019	Mark Smartt	31–29	16–14	T-3rd (East)	
2020	Mark Smartt	9–8	0–0	–	(Season cut short by the COVID-19 pandemic)
2021	Mark Smartt	27–26	13–11	3rd (East)	
Mark Smartt:		172–134	81–63		
2022	Skylar Meade	32–24	15–15	T-6th	
2023	Skylar Meade	40–22	18–12	T-3rd	NCAA Regional
2024	Skylar Meade	37–22	18–12	3rd	
2025	Skylar Meade	39–21	18–12	3rd	
2026	Skylar Meade	36–30	17–13	T-3rd	NCAA Super Regional
Skylar Meade:		184–119	33–27		
Total:		1090–778			
National champion Postseason invitational champion Conference regular season champion Conference regular season and conference tournament champion Division regular season champion Division regular season and conference tournament champion Conference tournament champion

== Postseason results ==
=== Division I ===
==== NCAA regionals ====
Year	Record	Regional	Results
1995	0–2	Tallahassee, FL Regional	L 3–18 vs. Florida State; L 5–8 vs. Ole Miss
1997	0–2	Tuscaloosa, AL Regional	L 5–8 vs. Alabama; L 2–5 vs. Southern California
2006	2–2	Tuscaloosa, AL Regional	W 10–8 vs. Southern Miss; L 3–4 vs. Alabama; W 6–5 vs. Southern Miss; L 5–14 vs. Alabama
2007	0–2	Oxford, MS Regional	L 2–14 vs. Southern Miss; L 6–7 vs. Sam Houston State
2011	1–2	Nashville, TN Regional	W 9–2 vs. Oklahoma State; L 2–10 vs. Vanderbilt; L 2–5 vs. Belmont
2013	2–2	Tallahassee, FL Regional	W 5–2 vs. Alabama; L 0–11 vs. Florida State; W 9–8 vs. Alabama; L 4–11 vs. Florida State
2018	1–2	Athens, GA Regional	W 6–0 vs. Duke; L 7–11 vs. Georgia; L 6–15 vs. Duke
2023	1–2	Tuscaloosa, AL Regional	W 11–10 vs. Boston College; L 8–11 vs. Alabama; L 1–4 vs. Boston College
2026	6–1	Gainesville, FL Regional	L 5–10 vs. Miami (FL); W 15–7 vs. Rider; W 9–6 vs. Miami (FL); W 16–11 vs. Florida; W 10–2 vs. Florida
2026	6–1	Troy, AL Super Regional	W 12–2 vs. Little Rock; W 7–2 vs. Little Rock
Totals	13–17	9 Appearances	

==== College World Series ====
Year	Record	Regional	Results
2026	1–2	College World Series	L 5–7 vs. West Virginia; W 12–8 vs. Ole Miss; L 0–12 vs. West Virginia
Totals	1–2	1 Appearance	

=== Division II ===
==== NCAA regionals ====
Year	Record	Regional	Results
1977	0–2	NCAA South Regional	L 5–15 vs. Eckerd College; L 2–3 vs. Florida Southern
1978	3–2	NCAA South Central Regional	L 0–8 vs. Delta State; W 4–3 vs. Southeastern Louisiana; W 18–9 vs. Mankato State; W 10–5 vs. Delta State; L 4–8 vs. Delta State
1979	1–2	NCAA South Regional	L 2–6 vs. Jacksonville State; W 1–0 vs. West Alabama; L 6–0 vs. Delta State
1980	4–1	NCAA Central Regional	W 8–2 vs. Wright State; L 6–8 vs. Bellarmine; W 4–3 vs. Wright State; W 3–1 vs. Bellarmine; W 2–1 vs. Bellarmine
1981	3–0	NCAA South Central Regional	W 4–1 vs. Indiana Central; W 3–1 vs. Northern Kentucky; W 5–4 vs. Delta State
1983	1–2	NCAA South Central Regional	W 4–0 vs. Indiana Central; L 4–5 vs. Jacksonville State; L 6–7 vs. Wright State
1984	4–1	NCAA South Central Regional	L 1–2 vs. North Alabama; W 7–6 vs. Indiana Central; W 5–1 vs. Jacksonville State; W 9–3 vs. North Alabama; W 9–3 vs. North Alabama
1985	3–0	NCAA South Central Regional	W 7–6 vs. North Alabama; W 10–2 vs. Delta State; W 10–6 vs. Delta State
1986	3–0	NCAA South Central Regional	W 8–7 vs. Sam Houston State; W 13–4 vs. Jacksonville State; W 6–4 vs. Sam Houston State
1987	3–0	NCAA South Central Regional	W 4–0 vs. North Alabama; W 8–5 vs. SIU-Edwardsville; W 3–1 vs. SIU-Edwardsville
1988	0–2	NCAA South Central Regional	L 7–8 vs. Central Missouri; L 7–9 vs. Delta State
1990	2–2	NCAA South Central Regional	W 10–5 vs. Missouri Southern; W 6–2 vs. Jacksonville State; L 0–5 vs. Jacksonville State; L 2–11 vs. Jacksonville State
1991	0–2	NCAA South Central Regional	L 0–2 vs. Jacksonville State; L 5–11 vs. Delta State
1993	3–0	NCAA South Central Regional	W 4–2 vs. Valdosta State; W 7–6 vs. North Alabama; W 7–3 vs. North Alabama
Totals	30–16	14 Appearances	

==== College World Series ====
Year	Record	Regional	Results
1980	1–2	College World Series	L 2–8 vs. Florida International; W 6–3 vs. Florida Southern; L 7–15 vs. New Haven
1981	1–2	College World Series	W 12–3 vs. Eastern Illinois; L 1–5 vs. Florida Southern; L 2–5 vs. Eastern Illinois
1984	2–2	College World Series	W 5–4 vs. New Haven; W 12–6 vs. South Dakota State; L 3–12 vs. Florida Southern; L 4–11 vs. Cal State-Northridge
1985	0–2	College World Series	L 1–9 vs. Valdosta State; L 5–10 vs. Florida Southern
1986	4–0	College World Series	W 8–6 vs. Mankato State; W 7–5 vs. New Haven; W 9–1 vs. Sacramento State; W 5–0 vs. Columbus College
1987	4–0	College World Series	W 6–0 vs. Tampa; W 6–2 vs. Cal State-Dominguez Hills; W 8–7 vs. Wright State; W 7–5 vs. Tampa
1993	2–2	College World Series	W 5–0 vs. Pennsylvania-Mansfield; L 1–13 vs. Tampa; W 7–2 vs. Pennsylvania-Mansfield; L 3–4 vs. Tampa
Totals	14–10	7 Appearances	

== See also ==
- List of NCAA Division I baseball programs
