= Springs Brooks Stadium =

Baseball park at Coastal Carolina University

- The Palace
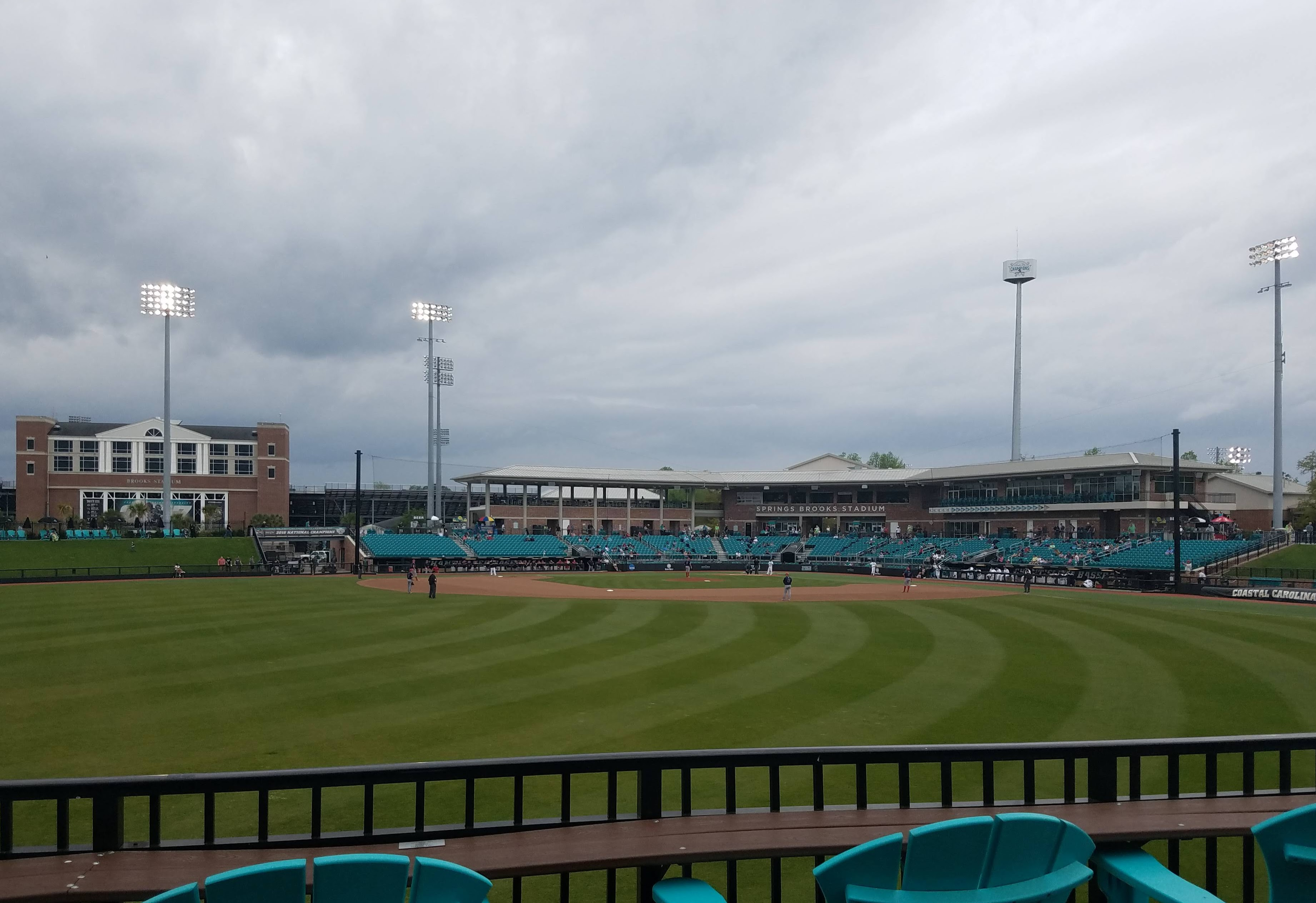
- Interactive map of Springs Brooks Stadium
- Location: 965 One Landon Loop; Conway, South Carolina
- Coordinates: 33.7935°N 79.0152°W
- Owner: Coastal Carolina University
- Operator: Coastal Carolina University
- Capacity: 5,300 (2016-present); 2,500 (2015)
- Surface: Natural grass
- Record attendance: 6,450 (June 1, 2025)

Construction
- Groundbreaking: around 1928-1929
- Opened: 1930
- Renovated: 2015
- Cost: $15.2 million

Tenants
- Coastal Carolina (NCAA) (1963–present); Myrtle Beach Blue Jays/Hurricanes (SAL) (1987-1992)

Springs Brooks Stadium/Vrooman Field is a baseball park in the southeastern United States, located on the campus of Coastal Carolina University in Conway, South Carolina. It is the home field of the Coastal Carolina Chanticleers of the Sun Belt Conference. The 33,000-square-foot (3,100 m^{2}) baseball project includes 2,500 permanent seats, with the potential to accommodate between 5,000 and 6,000 for major events like the NCAA postseason tournament.

== History ==
Formerly known as Charles Watson Stadium - Vrooman Field, the facility underwent renovations in 2004, which included a new scoreboard, a new fence, a new infield, and a new sound system. The field also had new lights installed in 2005. In 2008, new seats and new turf outside of the bases and home plate were installed. The clubhouse was also renovated with new lockers, a new lounge and a new training facility. The stadium capacity was expanded to nearly 2,200 during the 2008 season, with the addition of a right field deck dubbed "The Rooster's Nest." The stadium hosted an NCAA Regional for the first time in 2008. Following the 2012 season, the venue underwent major renovations and Coastal Carolina played their home games in 2013 and 2014 in nearby Myrtle Beach at TicketReturn.com Field.

The ballpark officially reopened in 2015 under its new name, Springs Brooks Stadium - Vrooman Field, on February 13. Its first game was between Maryland and Western Kentucky as part of the Caravelle Resort Tournament that CCU hosted. Later that day, Coastal Carolina defeated Old Dominion 4–0 in front of a crowd of 1,736, their first home game since renovations were completed. The attendance record of 6,450 was set on June 1, 2025, when CCU defeated East Carolina 1-0 in the Conway Regional of the NCAA Division I baseball tournament.

The diamond has an unorthodox southeasterly alignment (home plate to center field); the recommended orientation is east-northeast. The elevation of the field is approximately forty feet (12 m) above sea level.

== See also ==
- List of NCAA Division I baseball venues
