= Louisiana–Monroe Warhawks baseball =

ULM Warhawks
- 2027 Louisiana–Monroe Warhawks baseball team
- Founded: 1952; 74 years ago
- University: University of Louisiana at Monroe
- Athletic director: S. J. Tuohy
- Head coach: Ford Pemberton (1st season)
- Conference: Sun Belt; West Division
- Location: Monroe, Louisiana
- Home stadium: Lou St. Amant Field (capacity: 1,800)
- Nickname: Warhawks
- Colors: Maroon and gold

NCAA tournament appearances
- 1983, 1995, 1999, 2000, 2012

Conference tournament champions
- Southland: 1995; Sun Belt: 2012

Conference regular season champions
- Gulf States: 1964, 1966, 1968, 1969, 1970, 1971; Southland: 1983, 1996, 1999, 2000, 2002; Sun Belt: 2008

The ULM Warhawks baseball (formerly the Northeast Louisiana Indians) team represents the University of Louisiana at Monroe in NCAA Division I college baseball. The Warhawks baseball team competes in the Sun Belt Conference. The Warhawks play their home games on campus at Lou St. Amant Field, and are currently coached by Ford Pemberton.

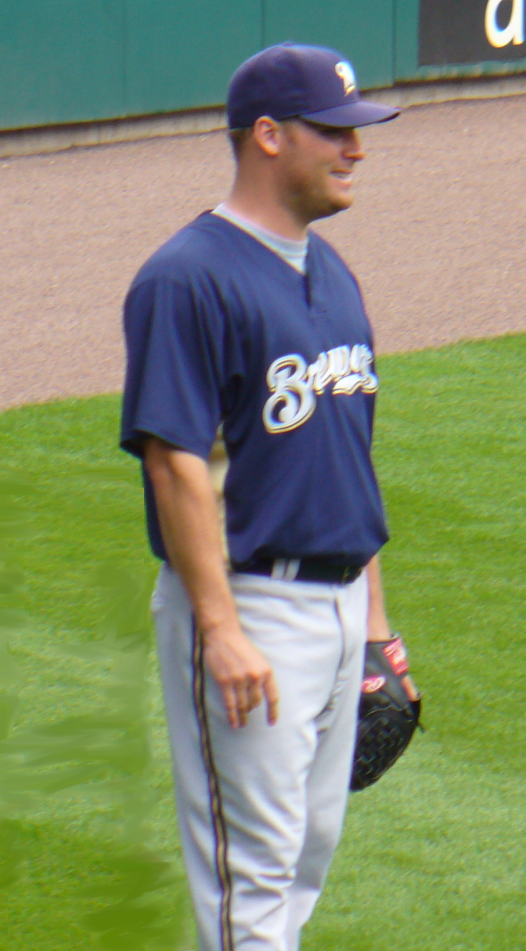
Ben Sheets, four-time MLB All-Star.

== History ==
=== Head coaches ===
The Warhawks have had 12 head coaches in the history of their baseball program:

	Coach	Seasons	Wins	Losses	Ties	Win %
1	Woody Boyles	1952–1954	23	16	1	.588
2	George Luffey	1955–1966	131	134	1	.494
3	Bill Dotson	1966–1972	171	112	2	.604
4	Terry Murry	1973	7	18	0	.280
5	Steve Maddox	1974	6	27	0	.182
6	Jimmy "Chick" Childress	1975	13	17	0	.433
7	Lou St. Amant	1976–1993	414	428	5	.492
8	Smoke Laval	1994–2000	241	159	0	.603
9	Brad Holland	2001–2006	150	151	0	.498
10	Jeff Schexnaider	2006–2014	212	254	0	.455
11	Bruce Peddie	2014–2017	72	125	0	.365
12	Michael Federico	2018–2025	171	227	1	.430

Notes: Brad Holland was fired after an 0–13 start in 2006 and was replaced by Jeff Schexnaider. Schexnaider was fired after an 8–17 start in 2014 and was replaced by Bruce Peddie.

=== Conference membership history ===
- 1952–1953: Independent
- 1954–1971: Gulf States Conference
- 1972–1978: Independent
- 1979–1982: Atlantic Sun Conference
- 1983–2006: Southland Conference
- 2007–Present: Sun Belt Conference

=== Regular season Championships ===
Year	Coach	Record	Conference Title
1964	George Luffey	17–10 (13–3)	Gulf State Conference champions
1966	Bill Dotson	17–9 (13–9)	Gulf State Conference champions
1968	Bill Dotson	26–15–1 (15–5)	Gulf State Conference champions
1969	Bill Dotson	25–11 (16–6)	Gulf State Conference champions
1970	Bill Dotson	35–19 (16–6)	Gulf State Conference champions
1982	Lou St. Amant	22–29–1 (7–5)	Atlantic Sun Conference Champions (West Division)
1983	Lou St. Amant	32–21 (11–3)	Southland Conference Champions
1996	Smoke Laval	41–19 (21–9)	Southland Conference Champions (Louisiana)
1999	Smoke Laval	36–22 (19–7)	Southland Conference Champions
2000	Smoke Laval	41–22 (20–7)	Southland Conference Champions
2002	Brad Holland	29–29 (20–10)	Southland Conference Champions
2008	Jeff Schexnaider	34–24 (20–10)	Sun Belt Conference Champions
Regular season championships:			13

=== Conference Tournament Championships ===
Year	Coach	Record	Conference Title
1995	Smoke Laval	37–20 (16–7)	Southland Conference Champions
2012	Jeff Schexnaider	32–30 (15–15)	Sun Belt Conference Champions
Conference Tournament championships:			2

=== Year-by-year results ===
Record table
Season	Coach	Overall	Conference	Standing	Postseason
Independents (1952–1953)
1952	Woody Boyles	5–3			
1953	Woody Boyles	8–4–1			
Independents:		13–7–1			
Gulf States Conference (1954–1971)
1954	Woody Boyles	10–9	7–5	3rd	
1955	George Luffey	9–8	6–6	3rd tied	
1956	George Luffey	9–12	4–8	6th	
1957	George Luffey	7–9	4–9	6th	
1958	George Luffey	12–10	8–7	2nd	
1959	George Luffey	15–11	8–7	3rd	
1960	George Luffey	10–13	5–7	4th	
1961	George Luffey	11–15	9–10	4th	
1962	George Luffey	13–19	7–11	5th	
1963	George Luffey	13–14	8–12	4th tied	
1964	George Luffey	17–10	13–3	1st	
1965	George Luffey	15–13–1	10–9–1	3rd	
1966	Bill Dotson	17–9	13–9	1st tied	
1967	Bill Dotson	23–15	12–10	2nd	
1968	Bill Dotson	26–15–1	15–5	1st	NAIA Area 5 Runner-Up/District 27 Champions
1969	Bill Dotson	25–11	16–6	1st	NAIA District 30 Champions
1970	Bill Dotson	35–19	16–6	1st	NAIA National Runner-Up/Area 2 Champions/District 30 Champions
1971	Bill Dotson	29–17–1	11–9	2nd	NAIA Area 2 Runner-Up/District 30 Champions
Gulf States:		296–229–3	172–139–1		
Independent (1972–1978)
1972	Bill Dotson	16–26			
1973	Terry Murry	7–18			
1974	Steve Maddox	6–27			
1975	Chick Childress	13–17			
1976	Lou St. Amant	20–13			
1977	Lou St. Amant	17–24–1			
1978	Lou St. Amant	20–38			
Independents:		99–163–1			
Atlantic Sun (1979–1982)
1979	Lou St. Amant	22–26	Tourney Only	4th	
1980	Lou St. Amant	20–15	Tourney Only	3rd	
1981	Lou St. Amant	33–22	6–6	3rd	
1982	Lou St. Amant	22–29–1	7–5	1st West/Tied	
Atlantic Sun:		97–92–1	13–11		
Southland Conference (1983–2006)
1983	Lou St. Amant	32–21	11–3	1st	1983 NCAA Austin Regional (0–2)
1984	Lou St. Amant	34–16	10–5	3rd	
1985	Lou St. Amant	26–22–1	5–8–1	5th	
1986	Lou St. Amant	25–22	6–12	6th	
1987	Lou St. Amant	24–28–1	7–8	3rd	
1988	Lou St. Amant	19–26	11–8	2nd	
1989	Lou St. Amant	14–29	6–10	6th	
1990	Lou St. Amant	28–17	10–8	4th	
1991	Lou St. Amant	21–30	6–11	6th	
1992	Lou St. Amant	24–24	9–12	5th tied	
1993	Lou St. Amant	13–26–1	5–18	9th	
1994	Smoke Laval	20–33	6–18	9th	
1995	Smoke Laval	37–20	16–7	3rd	1995 Baton Rouge Regional (0–2)
1996	Smoke Laval	41–19	21–9	1st	
1997	Smoke Laval	33–21	17–11	3rd	
1998	Smoke Laval	33–22	13–9	2nd	
1999	Smoke Laval	36–22	19–7	1st	1999 NCAA Baton Rouge Regional (0–2)
2000	Smoke Laval	41–22	20–7	1st	2000 NCAA Baton Rouge Regional (2–2)
2001	Brad Holland	36–24	17–10	2nd	
2002	Brad Holland	29–29	17–10	1st	
2003	Brad Holland	29–28	12–14	3rd	
2004	Brad Holland	30–28	12–14	5th tied	
2005	Brad Holland	26–29	9–18	9th	
2006	Brad Holland/Jeff Schexnaider	18–37	12–16	8th	
Southland:		669–595–3	277–253–1		
Sun Belt Conference (2007–present)
2007	Jeff Schexnaider	29–28	15–14	3rd tied	
2008	Jeff Schexnaider	34–24	20–10	1st	
2009	Jeff Schexnaider	32–27	12–17	7th tied	
2010	Jeff Schexnaider	17–38	7–23	10th	
2011	Jeff Schexnaider	24–30	9–21	9th tied	
2012	Jeff Schexnaider	32–30	15–15	5th tied	2012 NCAA Baton Rouge Regional (1–2)
2013	Jeff Schexnaider	18–36	7–23	10th	
2014	Jeff Schexnaider/Bruce Peddie	23–36	11–19	8th tied	
2015	Bruce Peddie	25–29	12–18	10th	
2016	Bruce Peddie	20–35	10–20	10th	
2017	Bruce Peddie	12–42	6–23	12th	
2018	Michael Federico	23–31	10–20	6th (West)	
2019	Michael Federico	27–31	12–17	5th (West)	
2020	Michael Federico	12–5	0–0	No conference season	Season canceled due to the COVID-19 pandemic
2021	Michael Federico	26–26	11–13	3rd (West)	
Sun Belt:		354–448	169–258		
Total:		1,528–1,534–9			
National champion Postseason invitational champion Conference regular season champion Conference regular season and conference tournament champion Division regular season champion Division regular season and conference tournament champion Conference tournament champion

=== NCAA Regional appearances ===
· ULM has a record of 3–9 in regional appearances.

NCAA Regional Results
1983 Austin, TX Regional

Lost to Texas, 0–15
Lost to Texas–Pan American, 8–9

1995 Baton Rouge, LA Regional

Lost to Cal State Fullerton, 6–7
Lost to Central Michigan, 11–14

1999 Baton Rouge, LA Regional

Lost to LSU, 4–11
Lost to Southern, 7–8

2000 Baton Rouge, LA Regional

Defeated New Orleans, 8–3
Lost to LSU, 0–21
Defeated New Orleans, 10–4
Lost to LSU, 3–5

2012 Baton Rouge, LA Regional

Lost to LSU, 1–4
Defeated Belmont, 6–3
Lost to Oregon State, 2–11

== Major League Baseball ==
Louisiana–Monroe has had 65 Major League Baseball draft selections since the draft began in 1965, five of whom have reached the major leagues.

Warhawks in the Major League Baseball Draft
Year	Player	Round	Team
1965	Gary Fields	55	Astros
1970	Wayne Burney	22	Dodgers
1972	Murphy Eppinette	1	White Sox
1979	Robert Wood	20	Athletics
1982	Edwin Knowles	23	Angels
1984	Chuck Finley	15	Angels
1985	Mitch Thomas	8	Rangers
1986	Blane Lockley	13	Pirates
1986	Joe Sims	15	Expos
1987	Terry Mathews	5	Rangers
1987	Kevin Cavalier	23	Expos
1987	Ken Brown	50	Yankees
1990	Patrick Morphy	34	Yankees
1990	Greg McGough	40	White Sox
1991	Harold Henry	6	White Sox
1992	Stanley Wiltz	29	Pirates
1992	Blake Doolan	33	Phillies
1993	Wade Walker	16	Cubs
1993	Steve Bourgeois	21	Giants
1993	Christian McCarter	26	Red Sox
1994	Chad Olinde	36	Cubs
1995	Denny Bair	8	Cubs
1996	Shannon Cooley	24	Phillies
1998	Lance Caraccioli	10	Dodgers
1998	Brandon Smith	23	Astros
1998	Jason Shelley	29	Blue Jays
1998	Donald Loland	46	Blue Jays
1999	Ben Sheets	1	Brewers
1999	Corey Artieta	31	Brewers
2000	Mike Wombacher	13	Yankees
2001	Brian Schriner	34	Phillies
2003	Corey Coles	5	Mets
2003	Jordy Templet	17	Blue Jays
2003	Caleb McConnell	21	Phillies
2003	Joseph Wolfe	33	Blue Jays
2004	Patrick Green	7	Royals
2004	Jim Miller	8	Rockies
2004	Matt Guillory	11	Pirates
2004	Kevin Ardoin	12	Rangers
2004	Ben Jones	14	Yankees
2004	Ryan Schwabe	23	Orioles
2004	Justin Lensch	37	Rangers
2005	Matt Green	2	Diamondbacks
2005	Matthew Lane	16	Cardinals
2005	James Bennett	23	Athletics
2006	David Mixon	47	Diamondbacks
2007	David Mixon	20	Giants
2007	Bo Bowman	22	Rockies
2008	Richard Soignier	17	Marlins
2008	Kyle Suire	35	Mets
2009	Richard Soignier	22	Yankees
2009	Justin Anderson	24	Orioles
2011	Drew Granier	32	Athletics
2011	James Jones	33	Padres
2012	Jeremy Sy	12	Giants
2012	Randall Zeigler	19	Giants
2012	Joseph Rapp	28	Giants
2014	Tyler Bray	26	Cardinals
2015	Kodie Tidwell	26	Padres
2016	Brayden Bouchey	33	Blue Jays
2017	Nathan Reynolds	39	Diamondbacks
2018	Keegan Curtis	22	Yankees
2019	Chad Bell	19	Yankees
2019	Trent Tingelstad	22	Mariners
2019	Trey Jeans	33	White Sox

== Retired Players ==
· #8 – Tom Brown
· #15 – Ben Sheets
· #24 – Lou St. Amant
· #31 – Chuck Finley

== Warhawk Field ==
=== Attendance ===
ULM has ranked in the Top 50 in average attendance in the nation four times since 1999.

Year	National Rank	Avg. attendance
1999	43rd	820
2001	42nd	926
2012	39th	1,603
2013	45th	1,439

==== Attendance Records ====
Below is a list of ULM's top five single-game attendance figures.

Attendance	Year	Opponent	Result
4,635	2001	LSU	L 4-16
4,401	2002	LSU	L 3-10
4,371	1997	LSU	W 6-2
3,876	1999	LSU	W 6-5
3,673	2009	Mississippi State	W 7-1

== See also ==
- List of NCAA Division I baseball programs
