= Little Rock Trojans baseball =

Little Rock Trojans
- 2026 Little Rock Trojans baseball team
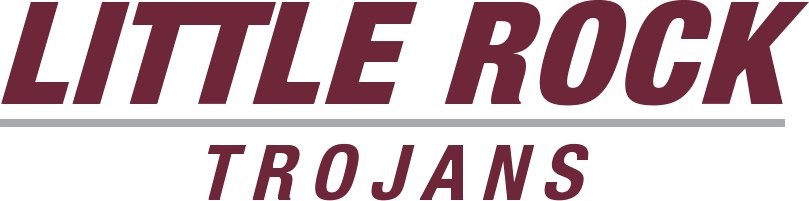
- Founded: 1975; 51 years ago
- Overall record: 1,178–1,438–1 (.450)
- University: University of Arkansas at Little Rock
- Head coach: Chris Curry (12th season)
- Conference: UAC
- Location: Little Rock, Arkansas
- Home stadium: Gary Hogan Field (capacity: 2,550)
- Nickname: Trojans
- Colors: Maroon, silver, and white

NCAA regional champions
- 2026

NCAA tournament appearances
- 2011, 2025, 2026

Conference tournament champions
- Sun Belt: 2011; OVC: 2025, 2026

Conference regular season champions
- OVC: 2024

The Little Rock Trojans baseball team is a varsity intercollegiate athletic team of the University of Arkansas at Little Rock in Little Rock, Arkansas, United States. The team is a member of the United Athletic Conference (UAC), which is part of the NCAA Division I. The team plays its home games at Gary Hogan Field in Little Rock, Arkansas.

On July 1, 2015, the Trojans announced they would no longer be branded as Arkansas–Little Rock or "UALR," but will be the Little Rock Trojans effective immediately.

== Little Rock in the NCAA Tournament ==
Year	Record	Pct	Notes
2011	0–2	.000	Eliminated by (3) Georgia in Corvallis Regional
2025	3–2	.600	Eliminated by (1) #6 LSU in Baton Rouge Regional final
2026	3–2	.600	Hattiesburg Regional champions Eliminated by Troy in Troy Super Regional
TOTALS	6–6	.500	

== Year-by-year results ==
Record table
Season	Coach	Overall	Conference	Standing	Postseason
Independents (1975–1980)
1975	Jack Fulmer	15–19			
1976	Jack Fulmer	19–30			
1977	Jack Fulmer	26–16			
1978	Jack Fulmer	11–24			
1979	Jack Fulmer	17–18			
1980	Jack Fulmer	17–16			
Independents:		105–123			
Trans-American Athletic Conference (1981–1991)
1981	Jack Fulmer	22–25	0–6	3rd (East)	
1982	Jack Fulmer	11–31	2–8	3rd (East)	
1983	Jack Fulmer	23–20–1	3–2	3rd	
1984	Jack Fulmer	20–30	10–14	3rd (West)	
1985	Jack Fulmer	21–23	7–8	3rd (West)	
1986	Gary Hogan	10–36	3–13	3rd (West)	
1987	Gary Hogan	25–20	9–7	2nd (West)	
1988	Gary Hogan	26–29	8–8	2nd (West)	
1989	Gary Hogan	28–25	7–9	2nd (West)	
1990	Gary Hogan	33–20	8–7	2nd (West)	
1991	Gary Hogan	28–27	6–10	3rd (West)	
Trans-American:		247–286–1	63–92		
Sun Belt Conference (1992–2022)
1992	Gary Hogan	26–30	8–12	5th (East)	
1993	Gary Hogan	24–29	5–13	5th (East)	
1994	Gary Hogan	21–33	4–19	5th (East)	
1995	Gary Hogan	24–28	8–18	7th	
1996	Gary Hogan	29–22	10–15	8th	
1997	Brian Rhees	6–43	2–22	10th	
1998	Brian Rhees	17–38	5–21	10th	
1999	Brian Rhees	20–37	10–22	7th	
2000	Brian Rhees	33–23	16–13	4th	
2001	Brian Rhees	26–24	12–15	7th	
2002	Brian Rhees	19–35	5–17	9th	
2003	Brian Rhees	30–26	9–14	7th	
2004	Brian Rhees	16–32	6–18	9th	
2005	Brian Rhees	23–33	6–17	9th	
2006	Jim Lawler	24–30	5–19	9th	
2007	Jim Lawler	21–31	9–20	11th	
2008	Jim Lawler	16–32	10–18	10th	
2009	Scott Norwood	16–34	7–21	11th	
2010	Scott Norwood	29–25	12–16	9th	
2011	Scott Norwood	24–34	10–20	8th	2011 NCAA Regional
2012	Scott Norwood	26–28	12–18	9th	
2013	Scott Norwood	28–28	13–17	7th	
2014	Scott Norwood	25–29	11–19	10th	
2015	Chris Curry	16–33	12–17	9th	
2016	Chris Curry	26–28	17–13	3rd	
2017	Chris Curry	21–34	11–18	5th (West)	
2018	Chris Curry	28–28	15–14	3rd (West)	
2019	Chris Curry	29–28	18–11	2nd (West)	
2020	Chris Curry	9–8	0–0	No conference season	Season canceled due to the COVID-19 pandemic
2021	Chris Curry	21–30	11–13	4th (West)	
2022	Chris Curry	24–27	11–18	8th	
Sun Belt:		697–920	290–508		
Ohio Valley Conference (2023–present)
2023	Chris Curry	31–23	14–8	2nd	
2024	Chris Curry	32–24	19–8	1st	
2025	Chris Curry	27–34	8-16	8th	2025 NCAA Regional
2026	Chris Curry	39–28	16-11	4th	2026 NCAA Super Regional
OVC:		129–109	57–43		
Total:		1,178–1,438–1			
National champion Postseason invitational champion Conference regular season champion Conference regular season and conference tournament champion Division regular season champion Division regular season and conference tournament champion Conference tournament champion

== See also ==
- List of NCAA Division I baseball programs
