= 2026 South Alabama Jaguars baseball team =

American college baseball season

2026 South Alabama Jaguars baseball
- Conference: Sun Belt Conference
- Record: 34–23 (17–13 SBC)
- Head coach: Mark Calvi (15th season)
- Assistant coaches: Matt Hancock; Drew LaBounty; Michael Wood; Tyler Kehoe
- Home stadium: Eddie Stanky Field

2026 Sun Belt Conference baseball standings
| | Conf. | | | | Overall |
| Team | W | | L | PCT | W | | L | PCT |
|---|---|---|---|---|---|---|---|---|
| No. 24 Southern Miss ‍†‍‡‍^{y} | 22 | – | 8 | .733 | 40 | – | 14 | .741 |
| Coastal Carolina ‍‍‍^{y} | 21 | – | 9 | .700 | 36 | – | 19 | .655 |
| Appalachian State ‍‍‍ | 17 | – | 13 | .567 | 30 | – | 22 | .577 |
| No. 8 Troy ‍‍‍^{y} | 17 | – | 13 | .567 | 29 | – | 27 | .518 |
| South Alabama ‍‍‍ | 17 | – | 13 | .567 | 33 | – | 21 | .611 |
| Texas State ‍‍‍^{y} | 16 | – | 14 | .533 | 34 | – | 22 | .607 |
| Louisiana ‍‍‍^{y} | 16 | – | 14 | .533 | 34 | – | 21 | .618 |
| Old Dominion ‍‍‍ | 15 | – | 15 | .500 | 29 | – | 25 | .537 |
| Georgia State ‍‍‍ | 14 | – | 16 | .467 | 26 | – | 28 | .481 |
| Marshall ‍‍‍ | 13 | – | 17 | .433 | 23 | – | 31 | .426 |
| Arkansas State ‍‍‍ | 12 | – | 18 | .400 | 29 | – | 24 | .547 |
| Louisiana–Monroe ‍‍‍ | 12 | – | 18 | .400 | 27 | – | 28 | .491 |
| James Madison ‍‍‍ | 11 | – | 19 | .367 | 21 | – | 32 | .396 |
| Georgia Southern ‍‍‍ | 7 | – | 23 | .233 | 16 | – | 40 | .286 |
† – Conference champion ‡ – Tournament champion y – Invited to the NCAA Tournament; As of May 17, 2026; Rankings from D1Baseball

The 2026 South Alabama Jaguars baseball team represented University of South Alabama during the 2026 NCAA Division I baseball season. The Jaguars played their home games at Eddie Stanky Field and were led by fifteenth-year head coach Mark Calvi. They were members of the Sun Belt Conference.

== Preseason ==
=== Sun Belt Conference Coaches Poll ===
The Sun Belt Conference Coaches Poll was released on February 4, 2026. South Alabama was picked to finish eleventh with 62 votes.

Coaches poll
| Predicted finish | Team | Votes (1st place) |
| 1 | Coastal Carolina | 194 (12) |
| 2 | Southern Miss | 182 (1) |
| 3 | Troy | 166 |
| 4 | Marshall | 129 |
| 5 | Louisiana | 126 (1) |
| 6 | Texas State | 114 |
| T7 | Georgia Southern | 104 |
| T7 | Old Dominion | 104 |
| 9 | Arkansas State | 96 |
| 10 | Appalachian State | 78 |
| 11 | South Alabama | 62 |
| 12 | Georgia State | 49 |
| 13 | James Madison | 48 |
| 14 | ULM | 18 |

=== Preseason All-Sun Belt Team & Honors ===
- Cameron Flukey (CCU, Jr, Pitcher)
- Hayden Johnson (CCU, Jr, Pitcher)
- Colby Allen (USM, Sr, Pitcher)
- Ryan Lynch (CCU, Gr, Pitcher)
- Tucker Stockman (USM, Jr, Catcher)
- Blake Cavill (TROY, Sr, 1st Base)
- Joseph Zamora (APP, Gr, 2nd Base)
- Patrick Engskov (ARST, Sr, Shortstop)
- Chase Mora (TXST, Sr, 3rd Base)
- Ashton Quiller (ARST, RS So, Outfielder)
- Dean Mihos (CCU, Sr, Outfielder)
- Ben Higdon (USM, RS Sr, Outfielder)
- Jimmy Janicki (TROY, So, Utility)
- Kameron Miller (APP, Jr, Designated Hitter)

== Personnel ==
2026 South Alabama Jaguars baseball team
Players
Coaches

| # | Pos. | Name | B/T | Height | Weight | Year | Home town |
|---|---|---|---|---|---|---|---|
| 2 | INF | Marc Stephens (redshirt) | R/R | 6 ft 0 in (1.83 m) | 190 lb (86 kg) | Jr | Orange Beach, Alabama |
| 4 | OF | Ethan Melton | R/R | 5 ft 10 in (1.78 m) | 175 lb (79 kg) | Jr | Hernando, Mississippi |
| 6 | OF | Damien Gatson Jr. | L/L | 6 ft 0 in (1.83 m) | 188 lb (85 kg) | Fr | Mobile, Alabama |
| 7 | INF | Stewart Puckett (redshirt) | L/R | 5 ft 10 in (1.78 m) | 190 lb (86 kg) | Jr | DeLeon Springs, Florida |
| 8 | OF | Brady Picarelli | L/R | 6 ft 3 in (1.91 m) | 215 lb (98 kg) | So | Eureka, Missouri |
| 9 | INF | Robert Miranda | R/R | 5 ft 10 in (1.78 m) | 170 lb (77 kg) | Sr | Miami, Florida |
| 10 | LHP | Jaxon Shineflew | L/L | 6 ft 2 in (1.88 m) | 175 lb (79 kg) | Jr | Wetumpka, Alabama |
| 11 | LHP | Bryant Quimby (redshirt) | L/L | 6 ft 3 in (1.91 m) | 220 lb (100 kg) | Sr | Atmore, Alabama |
| 13 | RHP | Mitchell Heer (redshirt) | R/R | 5 ft 11 in (1.8 m) | 205 lb (93 kg) | Sr | Acworth, Georgia |
| 14 | OF | Rett Johnson | L/R | 5 ft 9 in (1.75 m) | 170 lb (77 kg) | Jr | Blue Springs, Mississippi |
| 15 | | Cole Dean | L/L | 5 ft 11 in (1.8 m) | 190 lb (86 kg) | Fr | Fairhope, Alabama |
| 16 | RHP | Bryce Hendricks | R/R | 6 ft 0 in (1.83 m) | 195 lb (88 kg) | Jr | Laurel, Delaware |
| 17 | LHP | Hayden O'Dell | L/L | 6 ft 0 in (1.83 m) | 195 lb (88 kg) | Sr | Mobile, Alabama |
| 18 | UTL | Mike Young | R/R | 6 ft 3 in (1.91 m) | 185 lb (84 kg) | Sr | Montgomery, Alabama |
| 20 | RHP | Ryland Bozenhard | R/R | 5 ft 10 in (1.78 m) | 215 lb (98 kg) | Jr | St. Petersburg, Florida |
| 21 | UTL | Charlie Cassingham | L/R | 5 ft 8 in (1.73 m) | 161 lb (73 kg) | Fr | Huntsville, Alabama |
| 22 | UTL | Duncan Matthews | R/R | 5 ft 9 in (1.75 m) | 185 lb (84 kg) | Jr | Flowood, Mississippi |
| 23 | RHP | Tyler Smith | R/R | 6 ft 3 in (1.91 m) | 235 lb (107 kg) | Sr | Jackson, Tennessee |
| 24 | UTL | MD Conner | L/L | 6 ft 1 in (1.85 m) | 220 lb (100 kg) | Jr | Austin, Texas |
| 25 | UTL | Paxton Bigby | L/L | 6 ft 2 in (1.88 m) | 225 lb (102 kg) | Jr | Snohomish, Washington |
| 26 | INF | Brennon Wright | L/R | 6 ft 2 in (1.88 m) | 190 lb (86 kg) | Jr | Starkville, Mississippi |
| 27 | LHP | Max Miller | L/L | 6 ft 1 in (1.85 m) | 205 lb (93 kg) | Jr | Vancleave, Mississippi |
| 28 | UTL | Nathan Wood (redshirt) | R/R | 6 ft 2 in (1.88 m) | 200 lb (91 kg) | Sr | Pacific Grove, California |
| 29 | OF | Nick Richardson | L/L | 6 ft 0 in (1.83 m) | 175 lb (79 kg) | Fr | Oxford, Alabama |
| 30 | RHP | Zach Stevens | R/R | 6 ft 0 in (1.83 m) | 190 lb (86 kg) | Jr | Millbrook, Alabama |
| 31 | RHP | Lucas Rodenberg (redshirt) | R/R | 6 ft 0 in (1.83 m) | 195 lb (88 kg) | So | Richmond, Missouri |
| 32 | UTL | Fuller Musgrove | R/R | 6 ft 1 in (1.85 m) | 195 lb (88 kg) | Fr | Chunchula, Alabama |
| 33 | RHP | Daniel Gonzalez | R/R | 6 ft 4 in (1.93 m) | 225 lb (102 kg) | Jr | Murrieta, California |
| 34 | LHP | Jake Middleton | L/L | 6 ft 1 in (1.85 m) | 210 lb (95 kg) | Jr | Phenix City, Alabama |
| 35 | RHP | Konnor Graham | R/R | 6 ft 5 in (1.96 m) | 215 lb (98 kg) | Jr | Hammond, Louisiana |
| 36 | UTL | Jacob Haley | R/R | 6 ft 3 in (1.91 m) | 200 lb (91 kg) | Jr | Huntsville, Alabama |
| 37 | RHP | Brian Garmon II | R/R | 6 ft 2 in (1.88 m) | 215 lb (98 kg) | Sr | Cumming, Georgia |
| 38 | LHP | Sam Boardwine (redshirt) | L/L | 5 ft 10 in (1.78 m) | 195 lb (88 kg) | Jr | Miamisburg, Ohio |
| 39 | LHP | Bray Goode | L/L | 6 ft 4 in (1.93 m) | 220 lb (100 kg) | Fr | Alexandria, Alabama |
| 40 | RHP | Collier Barham (redshirt) | R/R | 6 ft 1 in (1.85 m) | 185 lb (84 kg) | Jr | Oak Ridge, Louisiana |
| 41 | RHP | Will Sparks | R/R | 6 ft 4 in (1.93 m) | 200 lb (91 kg) | Fr | Fairhope, Alabama |
| 42 | | Blake Guerin | R/R | 6 ft 6 in (1.98 m) | 270 lb (122 kg) | Sr | Shoreview, Minnesota |
| 43 | RHP | Andrew Floyd | R/R | 5 ft 9 in (1.75 m) | 160 lb (73 kg) | Sr | Chelsea, Alabama |
| 44 | RHP | Trevor Hunter | R/R | 6 ft 9 in (2.06 m) | 245 lb (111 kg) | Jr | Corinth, Texas |
| 45 | RHP | Mathew Rios | R/R | 6 ft 2 in (1.88 m) | 210 lb (95 kg) | Fr | Miami, Florida |
| 46 | LHP | Sam Brady | L/L | 6 ft 1 in (1.85 m) | 195 lb (88 kg) | Gr | Lake Quivira, Kansas |

Head coach

Mark Calvi (Nova Southeastern)

Assistant coach(es)

Michael Wood (Davis & Elkins)
Drew LaBounty (South Alabama)
Matt Hancock (North Alabama)
Tyler Kehoe (South Alabama)

Legend

- (C) Team captain
- (S) Suspended
- (I) Ineligible
- Injured
- Current redshirt

Roster
Last update: 14 June 2026

== Schedule and results ==
2026 South Alabama Jaguars baseball game log (34–23)
Legend: = Win = Loss = Canceled Bold = South Alabama team member
Regular season (33–21)

February (8–3)
| Date | Time (CST) | TV | Opponent | Rank | Stadium | Score | Win | Loss | Save | Attend | Overall Record | Sun Belt Record | Sources |
|---|---|---|---|---|---|---|---|---|---|---|---|---|---|
| Feb. 13 | 6:30 pm | — | USC Upstate* | — | Eddie Stanky Field; Mobile, AL | **W** 16-7 | **Shineflew** **(1-0)** | Torres (0-1) | — | 823 | 1-0 | — | |
| Feb. 14 | 2:00 pm | — | USC Upstate* | — | Eddie Stanky Field | **L** 7-10 | Stukes (1-0) | **Miller** **(0-1)** | — | — | 1-1 | — | |
| Feb. 15 | 1:00 pm | ESPN+ | USC Upstate* | — | Eddie Stanky Field | **W** 7-3 | **Gonzalez** **(1-0)** | Bianchini (0-1) | — | 831 | 2-1 | — | |
| Feb. 17 | 6:00 pm | ESPN+ | at Nicholls State* | — | Ben Meyer Diamond at Ray E. Didier Field; Thibodaux, LA | **W** 7-5 | **Quimby** **(1-0)** | Benson (0-1) | **Floyd** **(1)** | — | 3-1 | — | |
| Feb. 20 | 4:00 pm | FloSports | at College of Charleston* | — | CofC Baseball Stadium at Patriots Point; Mount Pleasant, SC | **W** 16-2 (7 inn.) | **Heer** **(1-0)** | Thomas (0-2) | — | — | 4-1 | — | |
| Feb. 21 | 2:00 pm | FloSports | at College of Charleston* | — | CofC Baseball Stadium at Patriots Point | **W** 3-1 | **Miller** **(1-1)** | Bryant (0-1) | **Shineflew** **(1)** | 637 | 5-1 | — | |
| Feb. 22 | 1:00 pm | FloSports | at College of Charleston* | — | CofC Baseball Stadium at Patriots Point | **L** 6-7 | Myers (1-1) | **Floyd** **(0-1)** | — | — | 5-2 | — | |
| Feb. 24 | 6:00 pm | ESPN+ | at Southeastern Louisiana* | — | Pat Kenelly Diamond at Alumni Field; Hammond, LA | **W** 9-7 | **Goode** **(1-0)** | Todorowski (0-1) | **Garmon II** **(1)** | 1,321 | 6-2 | — | |
| Feb. 25 | 6:30 pm | ESPN+ | Tulane* | — | Eddie Stanky Field | **L** 2-15 (7 inn.) | Rodriguez (2-1) | **Stevens** **(0-1)** | — | 929 | 6-3 | — | |
| Feb. 27 | 6:30 pm | ESPN+ | West Georgia* | — | Eddie Stanky Field | **W** 7-4 | **Heer** **(2-0)** | Torres (0-1) | **Shineflew** **(2)** | 852 | 7-3 | — | |
| Feb. 28 | 2:00 pm | ESPN+ | West Georgia* | — | Eddie Stanky Field | **W** 21-6 (7 inn.) | **Quimby** **(2-0)** | Donnelly (0-2) | — | 965 | 8-3 | — | |

March (10–8)
| Date | Time (CST) | TV | Opponent | Rank | Stadium | Score | Win | Loss | Save | Attend | Overall Record | Sun Belt Record Record | Sources |
|---|---|---|---|---|---|---|---|---|---|---|---|---|---|
| Mar. 1 | 1:00 pm | ESPN+ | West Georgia* | — | Eddie Stanky Field | **W** 2-1 | **Stevens** **(1-1)** | Wright (0-3) | — | 847 | 9-3 | — | |
| Mar. 3 | 6:00 | ESPN+ | vs. UAB* | — | Riverwalk Stadium; Montgomery, AL | **W** 11-1 (8 inn.) | **O'Dell** **(1-0)** | **Hicks** **(0-1)** | — | — | 10-3 | — | |
| Mar. 6 | 6:30 pm | ESPN+ | Louisiana Tech* | — | Eddie Stanky Field | **W** 9-3 | **Heer** **(3-0)** | Dahl (2-2) | — | 1,066 | 11-3 | — | |
| Mar. 7 | 2:00 pm | ESPN+ | Louisiana Tech* | — | Eddie Stanky Field | **L** 2-6 | Rowan (3-2) | **Quimby** **(2-1)** | Fisher (3) | 973 | 11-4 | — | |
| Mar. 8 | 3:00 pm | ESPN+ | Louisiana Tech* | — | Eddie Stanky Field | **L** 1-6 | Roberson (3-1) | **Gonzalez** **(1-1)** | Allen (1) | — | 11-5 | — | |
| Mar. 11 | 6:30 pm | ESPN+ | Southeastern Louisiana* | — | Eddie Stanky Field | **W** 10-3 | **Miller** **(2-1)** | Toups (0-1) | — | 820 | 12-5 | — | |
| Mar. 13 | 6:00 pm | ESPN+ | at Louisiana | — | M. L. Tigue Moore Field at Russo Park; Lafayette, LA | **W** 3-2 | **Shineflew** **(3-0)** | Smith (0-1) | — | 4,205 | 13-5 | 1-0 | |
| Mar. 14 | 2:00 pm | ESPN+ | at Louisiana | — | M. L. Tigue Moore Field at Russo Park | **L** 3-4 | Herrmann (3-0) | **Middleton** **(0-1)** | — | 3,947 | 13-6 | 1-1 | |
| Mar. 15 | 1:00 pm | ESPN+ | at Louisiana | — | M. L. Tigue Moore Field at Russo Park | **L** 1-3 | Tollett (4-0) | **Gonzalez** **(1-2)** | Brasch (3) | 3,507 | 13-7 | 1-2 | |
| Mar. 17 | 6:30 pm | ESPN+ | Alabama* | — | Eddie Stanky Field | **W** 6-3 | **Stevens** **(2-1)** | Crowther (1-1) | — | 2,608 | 14-7 | 1-2 | |
| Mar. 20 | 6:30 pm | ESPN+ | ULM | — | Eddie Stanky Field | **W** 5-4 | **Shineflew** **(3-0)** | Hess (1-3) | — | 971 | 15-7 | 2-2 | |
| Mar. 21 | 2:00 pm | ESPN+ | ULM | — | Eddie Stanky Field | **L** 6-9 | Strmiska (2-0) | **Bozenhard** **(0-1)** | Roark (1) | 1,099 | 15-8 | 2-3 | |
| Mar. 22 | 1:00 pm | ESPN+ | ULM | — | Eddie Stanky Field | **W** 16-4 (7 inn.) | **Gonzalez** **(2-0)** | Dermody (4-1) | — | — | 16-8 | 3-3 | |
| Mar. 24 | 6:00 pm | ESPN+ | vs. #5 Auburn* | — | DABOS Park; Montgomery, AL | **L** 0-10 (8 inn.) | Alvarez (4-1) | **O'Dell** **(1-1)** | — | 2,044 | 16-9 | 3-3 | |
| Mar. 27 | 6:30 pm | ESPN+ | Old Dominion | — | Eddie Stanky Field | **W** 10-3 | **Heer** **(4-0)** | Kuskie (2-4) | — | 858 | 17-9 | 4-3 | |
| Mar. 28 | 2:00 pm | ESPN+ | Old Dominion | — | Eddie Stanky Field | **L** 0-2 | Tanton (2-0) | **Miller** **(2-2)** | Okonkwo (1) | 913 | 17-10 | 4-4 | |
| Mar. 29 | 12:00 pm | ESPN+ | Old Dominion | — | Eddie Stanky Field | **W** 12-1 (7 inn.) | **Gonzalez** **(3-2)** | Sulpizio (1-1) | — | 889 | 18-10 | 5-4 | |
| Mar. 31 | 4:00 pm | ESPN+ | New Orleans* | — | Eddie Stanky Field | **L** 1-2 | Henderson (2-0) | **O'Dell** **(1-2)** | Alack (3) | 813 | 18-11 | 5-4 | |

April (9–7)
| Date | Time (CST) | TV | Opponent | Rank | Stadium | Score | Win | Loss | Save | Attend | Overall Record | Sun Belt Record | Sources |
|---|---|---|---|---|---|---|---|---|---|---|---|---|---|
| Apr. 2 | 5:00 pm | ESPN+ | at #14 Coastal Carolina | — | Springs Brooks Stadium; Conway, SC | **L** 2-12 (7 inn.) | Jones (2-1) | **Heer** **(4-1)** | — | 4,614 | 18-12 | 5-5 | |
| Apr. 3 | 5:00 pm | ESPN+ | at #14 Coastal Carolina | — | Springs Brooks Stadium | **W** 15-2 | **Shineflew** **(4-0)** | Norman (4-3) | — | 4,137 | 19-12 | 6-5 | |
| Apr. 4 | 10:00 am | ESPN+ | at #14 Coastal Carolina | — | Springs Brooks Stadium | **L** 7-8 | Richardson (4-0) | **Garmon II** **(0-1)** | — | — | 19-13 | 6-6 | |
| Apr. 8 | 6:00 pm | — | at Alabama State* | — | Wheeler–Watkins Baseball Complex; Montgomery, AL | **L** 5-7 | Peterson (2-0) | **Quimby** **(2-2)** | Power (1) | 578 | 19-14 | 6-6 | |
| Apr. 10 | 5:30 pm | ESPN+ | at Georgia Southern | — | J.I. Clements Stadium; Statesboro, GA | **L** 3-5 | Pendley (5-3) | **Shineflew** **(4-1)** | — | 2,219 | 19-15 | 6-7 | |
| Apr. 11 | 1:00 pm | ESPN+ | at Georgia Southern | — | J.I. Clements Stadium | **W** 13-5 | **Bozenhard** **(1-1)** | DeGondea (1-3) | **Stevens** **(1)** | 2,407 | 20-15 | 7-7 | |
| Apr. 12 | 12:00 pm | ESPN+ | at Georgia Southern | — | J.I. Clements Stadium | **W** 13-12 | **Gonzalez** **(4-2)** | Mason (2-2) | **Garmon II** **(2)** | 1,683 | 21-15 | 8-7 | |
| Apr. 14 | 6:30 pm | ESPN+ | Nicholls State* | — | Eddie Stanky Field | **W** 4-3 | **Stevens** **(3-1)** | Poirrier (0-1) | — | 941 | 22-15 | 8-7 | |
| Apr. 17 | 6:30 pm | ESPN+ | Marshall | — | Eddie Stanky Field | **L** 2-6 | Blevins (7-2) | **Heer** **(4-2)** | — | — | 22-16 | 8-8 | |
| Apr. 18 | 2:00 pm | ESPN+ | Marshall | — | Eddie Stanky Field | **W** 7-3 | **Bozenhard** **(2-1)** | Harlow (3-4) | **Shineflew** **(3)** | 926 | 23-16 | 9-8 | |
| Apr. 19 | 12:00 pm | ESPN+ | Marshall | — | Eddie Stanky Field | **W** 4-1 | **Stevens** **(4–1)** | Doll (2–2) | — | 807 | 24–16 | 10–8 | |
| Apr. 22 | 6:30 pm | ESPN+ | Lamar* | — | Eddie Stanky Field | **W** 6–1 | **O'Dell** **(2-2)** | Burdick (0-2) | — | 822 | 25-16 | 10–8 | |
| Apr. 24 | 6:30 pm | ESPN+ | #18 Southern Miss | — | Eddie Stanky Field | **L** 3–4 | Och (4–1) | **Shineflew** **(4–2)** | Allen (1) | 2,713 | 25-17 | 10–9 | |
| Apr. 25 | 1:00 pm | ESPN+ | #18 Southern Miss | — | Eddie Stanky Field | **L** 7–16 | Sivley (4-2) | **Bozenhard** **(2–2)** | — | 1,808 | 25–18 | 10-10 | |
| Apr. 26 | 1:00 pm | ESPN+ | #18 Southern Miss | — | Eddie Stanky Field | **W** 4–3 | **Stevens** **(5-1)** | Och (4–2) | — | 2,474 | 26-18 | 11-10 | |
| Apr. 29 | 6:30 pm | — | at New Orleans* | — | Maestri Field at Privateer Park; New Orleans, LA | **W** 4-2 | **O'Dell** **(3-2)** | Velino (1-1) | **Shineflew** **(4)** | 489 | 27-18 | 11-10 | |

May (6–3)
| Date | Time (CST) | TV | Opponent | Rank | Stadium | Score | Win | Loss | Save | Attend | Overall Record | Sun Belt Record | Sources |
|---|---|---|---|---|---|---|---|---|---|---|---|---|---|
| May 1 | 7:30 pm | ESPN+ | at Texas State | — | Bobcat Ballpark; San Marcos, TX | **W** 6–2 | **Stevens** **(6–1)** | Cooper (4–3) | — | 1,062 | 28–18 | 12–10 | |
| May 2 | 2:30 pm | ESPN+ | at Texas State | — | Bobcat Ballpark | **W** 6–4 | **Smith** **(1–0)** | Smith (3–2) | — | 1,428 | 29–18 | 13–10 | |
| May 3 | 11:30 am | ESPN+ | at Texas State | — | Bobcat Ballpark | **W** 7–4 | **Haley** **(1–0)** | Hall (1–1) | — | 1,282 | 30-18 | 14–10 | |
| May 5 | — | ESPN+ | Alabama State | — | Eddie Stanky Field | **Canceled** | | | — | | — | — | |
| May 8 | 9:00 pm | ESPN+ | at Troy | — | Riddle-Pace Field; Troy, AL | **W** 12–1 (7 inn.) | **Heer** **(5–2)** | Stubbs (3–3) | — | 2,083 | 31-18 | 15-10 | |
| May 9 | 3:30 pm | ESPN+ | at Troy | — | Riddle-Pace Field | **L** 5–10 | Crotchfelt (3–2) | **Bozenhard** **(2–3)** | — | 2,262 | 31-19 | 15-11 | |
| May 10 | 1:00 pm | ESPN+ | at Troy | — | Riddle-Pace Field | **L** 1–8 | Smith (3–0) | **Gonzalez** **(4–3)** | — | 2,096 | 31-20 | 15-12 | |
| May 14 | 6:30 pm | ESPN+ | Arkansas State | — | Eddie Stanky Field | **L** 0–10 (7 inn.) | Weimer (5–2) | **Heer** **(5–3)** | — | 893 | 31-21 | 15–13 | |
| May 15 | 6:30 pm | ESPN+ | Arkansas State | — | Eddie Stanky Field | **W** 7–2 | **Shineflew** **(5–2)** | Allen (1–6) | **Stevens** **(2)** | 946 | 32-21 | 16-13 | |
| May 16 | 1:00 pm | ESPN+ | Arkansas State | — | Eddie Stanky Field | **W** 6–2 | **Smith** **(2–0)** | Farley (7–3) | **Haley** **(1)** | — | 33-21 | 17-13 | |

Postseason (1–2)

Sun Belt Tournament (1–2)
| Date | Time (CST) | TV | Opponent | Seed | Stadium | Score | Win | Loss | Save | Attend | Overall Record | Tourney Record | Sources |
|---|---|---|---|---|---|---|---|---|---|---|---|---|---|
| May 21 | 9:00 am | ESPN+ | vs. (4) Troy | (5) | DABOS Park | **L** 3–11 | Crotchfelt (4–2) | **Gonzalez** **(4–4)** | — | 375 | 33–22 | 0–1 | |
| May 21 | 4:00 pm | ESPN+ | vs. (9) Georgia State | (5) | DABOS Park | **W** 7–4 | **Stevens** **(7–1)** | Crooms (3–6) | — | 329 | 34–22 | 1–1 | |
| May 23 | 9:00 am | ESPN+ | vs. (4) Troy | (5) | DABOS Park | **L** 10–11 | Smith (4–0) | **Smith** **(2–1)** | — | 542 | 34–23 | 1–2 | |

* indicates a non-conference game.
(#) All rankings from D1 Baseball Poll on the date of the contest.
