= Sun Belt Tournament =

Sun Belt Championship or Sun Belt Tournament may refer to:

- Sun Belt Conference men's basketball tournament, men's basketball championship
- Sun Belt Conference women's basketball tournament, women's basketball championship
- Sun Belt Conference baseball tournament, baseball championship
- Sun Belt Conference Football Championship Game, college football championship
