= 2026 Louisiana Ragin' Cajuns baseball team =

Baseball team of the University of Louisiana at Lafayette

2026 Louisiana Ragin' Cajuns baseball

Starkville Regional, 2–2
- Conference: Sun Belt Conference
- Record: 41–25 (16–14 SBC)
- Head coach: Matt Deggs (7th season)
- Assistant coaches: Seth Thibodeaux; Zach Lafleur; Taylor Sandefur
- Home stadium: M. L. Tigue Moore Field at Russo Park

2026 Sun Belt Conference baseball standings
	Conf.				Overall
Team	W		L	PCT	W		L	PCT
No. 24 Southern Miss ‍†‍‡‍^{y}	22	–	8	.733	40	–	14	.741
Coastal Carolina ‍‍‍^{y}	21	–	9	.700	36	–	19	.655
Appalachian State ‍‍‍	17	–	13	.567	30	–	22	.577
No. 8 Troy ‍‍‍^{y}	17	–	13	.567	29	–	27	.518
South Alabama ‍‍‍	17	–	13	.567	33	–	21	.611
Texas State ‍‍‍^{y}	16	–	14	.533	34	–	22	.607
Louisiana ‍‍‍^{y}	16	–	14	.533	34	–	21	.618
Old Dominion ‍‍‍	15	–	15	.500	29	–	25	.537
Georgia State ‍‍‍	14	–	16	.467	26	–	28	.481
Marshall ‍‍‍	13	–	17	.433	23	–	31	.426
Arkansas State ‍‍‍	12	–	18	.400	29	–	24	.547
Louisiana–Monroe ‍‍‍	12	–	18	.400	27	–	28	.491
James Madison ‍‍‍	11	–	19	.367	21	–	32	.396
Georgia Southern ‍‍‍	7	–	23	.233	16	–	40	.286
† – Conference champion ‡ – Tournament champion y – Invited to the NCAA Tournament; As of May 17, 2026; Rankings from D1Baseball

The 2026 Louisiana Ragin' Cajuns baseball team will represent the University of Louisiana at Lafayette during the 2026 NCAA Division I baseball season. The Ragin' Cajuns will play their home games at M. L. Tigue Moore Field at Russo Park and are to be led by seventh–year head coach Matt Deggs. They will serve as members of the Sun Belt Conference.

== Preseason ==
=== Sun Belt Conference Coaches Poll ===
The Sun Belt Conference Coaches Poll was released February 4, 2026, and the Ragin' Cajuns were picked to finish fifth overall in the conference.

Coaches Poll
Predicted finish	Team	Votes (1st place)
1	Coastal Carolina	194 (12)
2	Southern Miss	182 (1)
3	Troy	166
4	Marshall	129
5	Louisiana	126 (1)
6	Texas State	114
7	Georgia Southern	104
7	Old Dominion	104
9	Arkansas State	96
10	App State	78
11	South Alabama	62
12	Georgia State	49
13	James Madison	48
14	ULM	18

== Personnel ==
2026 Louisiana Ragin' Cajuns baseball team
Players
Coaches

#	Pos.	Name	B/T	Height	Weight	Year	Home town
1	OF	Maddox Mandino	L/L	5 ft 9 in (1.75 m)	175 lb (79 kg)	Jr	Minden, Louisiana
2	OF	Donovan Lasalle	R/R	6 ft 2 in (1.88 m)	215 lb (98 kg)	Jr	Lake Charles, Louisiana
4	C	Steven Spalitta	L/R	6 ft 0 in (1.83 m)	185 lb (84 kg)	Jr	Mandeville, Louisiana
5	INF	Trip Dobson (redshirt)	R/R	6 ft 2 in (1.88 m)	190 lb (86 kg)	Fr	Baton Rouge, Louisiana
6	OF	Mark Collins	R/R	6 ft 1 in (1.85 m)	190 lb (86 kg)	So	Opelousas, Louisiana
7	INF	Griffin Hebert	L/R	5 ft 11 in (1.8 m)	200 lb (91 kg)	So	Lake Charles, Louisiana
8	INF	Lee Amedee	L/R	6 ft 1 in (1.85 m)	205 lb (93 kg)	Sr	Gonzales, Louisiana
9	INF	Drew Markle	R/R	6 ft 5 in (1.96 m)	190 lb (86 kg)	Jr	Katy, Texas
10	INF	Rigoberto Hernandez	S/R	6 ft 0 in (1.83 m)	190 lb (86 kg)	Sr	Panama City, Panama
11	LHP	Ty Roman	L/L	6 ft 3 in (1.91 m)	215 lb (98 kg)	Jr	Diboll, Texas
12	RHP	Garret Carter	R/R	6 ft 2 in (1.88 m)	195 lb (88 kg)	Jr	Allen, Texas
15	RHP	Cody Brasch	R/R	6 ft 3 in (1.91 m)	205 lb (93 kg)	Jr	Haslet, Texas
16	C	Parker Smith	R/R	6 ft 2 in (1.88 m)	200 lb (91 kg)	So	Montgomery, Texas
17	RHP	Sawyer Pruitt	R/R	6 ft 7 in (2.01 m)	240 lb (109 kg)	Fr	Watson, Louisiana
18	LHP	Chase Morgan	L/L	6 ft 3 in (1.91 m)	210 lb (95 kg)	Jr	Cypress, Texas
20	RHP	JR Tollett	R/R	6 ft 3 in (1.91 m)	210 lb (95 kg)	Jr	Ruston, Louisiana
21	INF	Kasen Bellard	R/R	6 ft 0 in (1.83 m)	180 lb (82 kg)	So	Lake Charles, Louisiana
22	INF	Owen Galt	R/R	5 ft 10 in (1.78 m)	180 lb (82 kg)	So	Lake Charles, Louisiana
25	OF	Jayce LaCava	R/R	6 ft 1 in (1.85 m)	205 lb (93 kg)	Jr	Marrero, Louisiana
27	RHP	Landon Victorian (redshirt)	R/R	6 ft 3 in (1.91 m)	180 lb (82 kg)	Fr	Lake Charles, Louisiana
29	INF	Blaze Rodriguez	R/R	5 ft 10 in (1.78 m)	175 lb (79 kg)	Fr	Slidell, Louisiana
30	RHP	Will Taylor	R/R	6 ft 3 in (1.91 m)	185 lb (84 kg)	So	Lafayette, Louisiana
32	LHP	Tyler Papenbrock	L/L	6 ft 4 in (1.93 m)	225 lb (102 kg)	Sr	Leo, Indiana
33	LHP	Bryce Wilson	L/L	6 ft 0 in (1.83 m)	170 lb (77 kg)	Fr	Meraux, Louisiana
34	LHP	Hayden Pearson	L/L	6 ft 1 in (1.85 m)	205 lb (93 kg)	Fr	Lafayette, Louisiana
39	LHP	Andrew Herrmann	L/L	6 ft 3 in (1.91 m)	215 lb (98 kg)	Gr	Kennesaw, Georgia
40	RHP	Cowan Alfonso	R/R	6 ft 3 in (1.91 m)	200 lb (91 kg)	Jr	Denham Springs, Louisiana
41	LHP	Cole Flanagan	L/L	6 ft 1 in (1.85 m)	230 lb (104 kg)	Fr	Moss Bluff, Louisiana
42	OF	Noah Lewis	R/R	6 ft 3 in (1.91 m)	195 lb (88 kg)	Fr	Baton Rouge, Louisiana
44	INF	Josh Lim	S/R	5 ft 7 in (1.7 m)	170 lb (77 kg)	Fr	Baton Rouge, Louisiana
45	RHP	Colt Brown	R/R	6 ft 2 in (1.88 m)	190 lb (86 kg)	Fr	Seguin, Texas
47	C	Jose Torres	R/R	5 ft 10 in (1.78 m)	195 lb (88 kg)	Sr	San Miguelito, Panama
53	RHP	Murphy Brooks	R/R	6 ft 3 in (1.91 m)	230 lb (104 kg)	RS So	Cypress, Texas

Head coach

Matt Deggs (Northwestern State)

Assistant coach(es)

Seth Thibodeaux (William Carey)
Zach Lafleur (Louisiana)
Taylor Sandefur (Western Carolina)

Legend

- (C) Team captain
- (S) Suspended
- (I) Ineligible
- Injured
- Current redshirt

Roster
Last update: 26 December 2025

== Schedule and results ==
Legend
	Louisiana win
	Louisiana loss
	Postponement/Cancelation/Suspensions
**Bold**	Louisiana team member

2026 Louisiana Ragin' Cajuns baseball game log (41–25)
Regular season (34–21)

February (8–3)
Date	Opponent	Rank	Site/stadium	Score	Win	Loss	Save	TV	Attendance	Overall record	SBC record
Feb. 13	Missouri State		M. L. Tigue Moore Field at Russo Park • Lafayette, LA	**L** 2–8	Yusypchuk (1–0)	**Roman** (0–1)	Lucas (1)	ESPN+	3,869	0–1	—
Feb. 14	Missouri State		M. L. Tigue Moore Field at Russo Park • Lafayette, LA	**L** 12–13^{(11)}	Knight (1–0)	**Brasch** (0–1)	Lucas (2)		3,783	0–2	—
Feb. 15	Missouri State		M. L. Tigue Moore Field at Russo Park • Lafayette, LA	**W** 9–7	**Tollett** (1–0)	Slater (0–1)	**Carter** (1)	ESPN+	3,730	1–2	—
Feb. 17	at Rice		Reckling Park • Houston, TX	**W** 3–0	**Pruitt** (1–0)	Blank (0–1)	**Brasch** (1)		1,327	2–2	—
Feb. 20	Maryland		M. L. Tigue Moore Field at Russo Park • Lafayette, LA	**W** 7–6	**Papenbrock** (1–0)	Cespedes (0–1)	None	ESPN+	4,020	3–2	—
Feb. 21	Maryland		M. L. Tigue Moore Field at Russo Park • Lafayette, LA	**W** 9–1	**Herrmann** (1–0)	Morlang (0–2)	None		3,920	4–2	—
Feb. 22	Maryland		M. L. Tigue Moore Field at Russo Park • Lafayette, LA	**W** 6–5^{(15)}	**Pearson** (1–0)	Bailey (0–1)	None	ESPN+	3,775	5–2	—
Feb. 24	Kansas State		M. L. Tigue Moore Field at Russo Park • Lafayette, LA	**W** 1–0	**Pruitt** (2–0)	Duke (0–1)	**Carter** (2)		3,783	6–2	—
Feb. 25	Kansas State		M. L. Tigue Moore Field at Russo Park • Lafayette, LA	**W** 3–2^{(11)}	**Wilson** (1–0)	Feser (1–1)	None	ESPN+	3,680	7–2	—
Feb. 27	UC San Diego		M. L. Tigue Moore Field at Russo Park • Lafayette, LA	**L** 3–7	Murdock (1–0)	**Roman** (0–2)	None	ESPN+	4,152	7–3	—
Feb. 28	UC San Diego		M. L. Tigue Moore Field at Russo Park • Lafayette, LA	**W** 8–0	**Herrmann** (2–0)	Gregson (0–3)	None	ESPN+	3,877	8–3	—

March (10–8)
Date	Opponent	Rank	Site/stadium	Score	Win	Loss	Save	TV	Attendance	Overall record	SBC record
Mar. 1	UC San Diego		M. L. Tigue Moore Field at Russo Park • Lafayette, LA	**W** 4–3	**Tollett** (2–0)	Bowker (0–1)	**Brasch** (2)	ESPN+	3,831	9–3	—
Mar. 4	No. 2 LSU		M. L. Tigue Moore Field at Russo Park • Lafayette, LA	**W** 7–2	**Brasch** (1–1)	Guidry (0–1)	**Pruitt** (1)	ESPN+	5,736	10–3	—
Mar. 6	at Dallas Baptist		Horner Ballpark • Dallas, TX	**W** 6–5	**Carter** (1–0)	Long (1–2)	None	ESPN+	933	11–3	—
Mar. 7	at Dallas Baptist		Horner Ballpark • Dallas, TX	**W** 11–6	**Tollett** (3–0)	Jenkins (1–2)	None	ESPN+	862	12–3	—
Mar. 8	at Dallas Baptist		Horner Ballpark • Dallas, TX	**L** 1–12^{(7)}	Watt (1–1)	**Pruitt** (2–1)	None	ESPN+	834	12–4	—
Mar. 10	UT Rio Grande Valley		M. L. Tigue Moore Field at Russo Park • Lafayette, LA	**W** 11–7	**Roman** (1–2)	Wiatrek (0–1)	None		3,403	13–4	—
Mar. 11	McNeese		M. L. Tigue Moore Field at Russo Park • Lafayette, LA	Postponed							
Mar. 13	South Alabama		M. L. Tigue Moore Field at Russo Park • Lafayette, LA	**L** 2–3	Shineflew (2–0)	**Parker** (0–1)	None	ESPN+	4,205	13–5	0–1
Mar. 14	South Alabama		M. L. Tigue Moore Field at Russo Park • Lafayette, LA	**W** 4–3	**Herrmann** (3–0)	Middleton (0–1)	None	ESPN+	3,947	14–5	1–1
Mar. 15	South Alabama		M. L. Tigue Moore Field at Russo Park • Lafayette, LA	**W** 3–1	**Tollett** (4–0)	Gonzalez (1–2)	**Brasch** (3)	ESPN+	3,507	15–5	2–1
Mar. 18	at Houston	No. 25	Don Sanders Field at Darryl & Lori Schroeder Park • Houston, TX	**W** 6–3^{(10)}	**Brasch** (2–1)	Hoffman (1–2)	None	ESPN+	777	16–5	—
Mar. 20	at Texas State	No. 25	Bobcat Ballpark • San Marcos, TX	**L** 1–4	Cooper (1–0)	**Smith** (0–2)	None	ESPN+	1,423	16–6	2–2
Mar. 21	at Texas State	No. 25	Bobcat Ballpark • San Marcos, TX	**L** 4–11	Smith (1–0)	**Hermann** (3–1)	None	ESPN+	1,427	16–7	2–3
Mar. 22	at Texas State	No. 25	Bobcat Ballpark • San Marcos, TX	**L** 6–16^{(7)}	Tovar (5–1)	**Tollett** (4–1)	None	ESPN+	1,565	16–8	2–4
Mar. 24	Southeastern Louisiana		M. L. Tigue Moore Field at Russo Park • Lafayette, LA	**W** 9–3	**Roman** (2–2)	Lirette (1–1)	None		3,992	17–8	—
Mar. 27	Louisiana–Monroe		M. L. Tigue Moore Field at Russo Park • Lafayette, LA	**L** 3–5	Brodnax (2–1)	**Pruitt** (2–2)	Hess (3)	ESPN+	4,202	17–9	2–5
Mar. 28	Louisiana–Monroe		M. L. Tigue Moore Field at Russo Park • Lafayette, LA	**L** 3–7	Corley (2–1)	**Herrmann** (3–2)	Hess (4)	ESPN+	3,990	17–10	2–6
Mar. 29	Louisiana–Monroe		M. L. Tigue Moore Field at Russo Park • Lafayette, LA	**W** 4–0	**Brasch** (3–1)	Dermody (4–2)	None	ESPN+	3,845	18–10	3–6
Mar. 31	at McNeese		Joe Miller Ballpark • Lake Charles, LA	**L** 7–10	Blanchard (2–2)	**Tollett** (4–2)	Morgan (1)		1,096	18–11	—

April (9–7)
Date	Opponent	Rank	Site/stadium	Score	Win	Loss	Save	TV	Attendance	Overall record	SBC record
Apr. 2	at James Madison		Eagle Field at Veterans Memorial Park • Harrisonburg, VA	**W** 5–4	**Smith** (1–2)	Kuhle (0–2)	**Brasch** (4)	ESPN+	818	19–11	4–6
Apr. 3	at James Madison		Eagle Field at Veterans Memorial Park • Harrisonburg, VA	**L** 5–6^{(11)}	Madden (1–0)	**Smith** (1–3)	None	ESPN+	864	19–12	4–7
Apr. 4	at James Madison		Eagle Field at Veterans Memorial Park • Harrisonburg, VA	**L** 1–5	Lutz (1–3)	**Roman** (2–3)	Muscar (1)	ESPN+	546	19–13	4–8
Apr. 8	at Southeastern Louisiana		Pat Kenelly Diamond at Alumni Field • Hammond, LA	**L** 6–7	Toups (2–1)	**Brasch** (3–2)	None	ESPN+	1,587	19–14	—
Apr. 10	No. 10 Southern Miss		M. L. Tigue Moore Field at Russo Park • Lafayette, LA	**L** 1–8	Harris (6–1)	**Pruitt** (2–3)	None	ESPN+	4,218	19–15	4–9
Apr. 11	No. 10 Southern Miss		M. L. Tigue Moore Field at Russo Park • Lafayette, LA	**W** 8–4	**Herrmann** (4–2)	Sunstrom (2–3)	None	ESPN+	4,121	20–15	5–9
Apr. 12	No. 10 Southern Miss		M. L. Tigue Moore Field at Russo Park • Lafayette, LA	**W** 6–5	**Smith** (2–3)	Och (3–1)	**Brasch** (5)	ESPN+	3,975	21–15	6–9
Apr. 17	at Troy		Riddle–Pace Field • Troy, AL	**L** 6–7	Crotchfelt (2–2)	**Roman** (2–4)	None	ESPN+	2,128	21–16	6–10
Apr. 18	at Troy		Riddle–Pace Field • Troy, AL	**W** 7–6	**Herrmann** (5–2)	Egan (4–2)	**Carter** (3)	ESPN+	2,866	22–16	7–10
Apr. 19	at Troy		Riddle–Pace Field • Troy, AL	**L** 11–15	Nelson (2–1)	**Carter** (1–1)	None	ESPN+	2,094	22–17	7–11
Apr. 21	Grambling State		M. L. Tigue Moore Field at Russo Park • Lafayette, LA	**W** 15–7	**Brooks** (1–0)	Mante (1–2)	**Tollett** (1)	ESPN+	3,641	23–17	—
Apr. 24	at Arkansas State		Tomlinson Stadium–Kell Field • Jonesboro, AR	**W** 3–2	**Pruitt** (3–3)	Garrison (2–2)	None	ESPN+	845	24–17	8–11
Apr. 25	at Arkansas State		Tomlinson Stadium–Kell Field • Jonesboro, AR	**W** 11–5^{(10)}	**Papenbrock** (2–0)	Van Der Lelie (2–1)	None	ESPN+	1,283	25–17	9–11
Apr. 26	at Arkansas State		Tomlinson Stadium–Kell Field • Jonesboro, AR	**L** 3–8	Farley (7–1)	**Tollett** (4–3)	None	ESPN+	781	25–18	9–12
Apr. 28	Southern		M. L. Tigue Moore Field at Russo Park • Lafayette, LA	**W** 15–5^{(7)}	**Pruitt** (4–3)	Prosper (1–1)	None	ESPN+	3,761	26–18	—
Apr. 29	Nicholls		M. L. Tigue Moore Field at Russo Park • Lafayette, LA	**W** 7–1	**Brooks** (2–0)	Vargas (0–2)	**Pearson** (1)	ESPN+	3,824	27–18	—

May (7–3)
Date	Opponent	Rank	Site/stadium	Score	Win	Loss	Save	TV	Attendance	Overall record	SBC record
May 2	Georgia State		M. L. Tigue Moore Field at Russo Park • Lafayette, LA	**W** 14–1^{(7)}	**Herrmann** (6–2)	Crooms (3–4)	None	ESPN+		28–18	10–12
May 2	Georgia State		M. L. Tigue Moore Field at Russo Park • Lafayette, LA	**W** 5–1	**Brasch** (4–2)	Caruso (5–6)	**Papenbrock** (1)	ESPN+	4,415	29–18	11–12
May 3	Georgia State		M. L. Tigue Moore Field at Russo Park • Lafayette, LA	**W** 4–3	**Pruitt** (5–3)	Roberts (1–3)	**Papenbrock** (2)	ESPN+	3,789	30–18	12–12
May 5	New Orleans		M. L. Tigue Moore Field at Russo Park • Lafayette, LA	**L** 6–9^{(10)}	Jones (3–1)	**Tollett** (4–4)	Alack (4)	ESPN+	3,740	30–19	—
May 8	at Appalachian State		Beaver Field at Jim and Bettie Smith Stadium • Boone, NC	**W** 5–4^{(10)}	**Pruitt** (6–3)	Wilson (3–2)	None	ESPN+	594	31–19	13–12
May 9	at Appalachian State		Beaver Field at Jim and Bettie Smith Stadium • Boone, NC	**L** 2–7	Peterson (8–0)	**Herrman** (6–3)	None	ESPN+	910	31–20	13–13
May 10	at Appalachian State		Beaver Field at Jim and Bettie Smith Stadium • Boone, NC	**W** 12–3	**Roman** (3–4)	Nolan (4–1)	None	ESPN+	654	32–20	14–13
May 14	No. 20 Coastal Carolina		M. L. Tigue Moore Field at Russo Park • Lafayette, LA	**W** 7–2	**Brasch** (5–2)	Jones (4–2)	None	ESPN+	4,612	33–20	15–13
May 15	No. 20 Coastal Carolina		M. L. Tigue Moore Field at Russo Park • Lafayette, LA	**L** 0–6	Horn (7–1)	**Herrmann** (6–4)	None	ESPN+	5,026	33–21	15–14
May 16	No. 20 Coastal Carolina		M. L. Tigue Moore Field at Russo Park • Lafayette, LA	**W** 3–2	**Roman** (4–4)	Norman (6–5)	**Papenbrock** (3)	ESPN+	4,936	34–21	16–14

Postseason (7–4)

Sun Belt tournament (5–2)
Date	Opponent	Seed	Site/stadium	Score	Win	Loss	Save	TV	Attendance	Overall record	SBCT record
May 19	vs. (10) Marshall	(7)	DABOS Park • Montgomery, AL	**W** 11–1^{(7)}	**Brasch** (6–2)	Blevins (8–5)	None	ESPN+	220	35–21	1–0
May 20	vs. (2); No. 24 Coastal Carolina	(7)	DABOS Park • Montgomery, AL	**W** 12–11	**Papenbrock** (3–0)	Appelman (0–3)	**Pearson** (2)	ESPN+	472	36–21	2–0
May 21	vs. (6) Texas State	(7)	DABOS Park • Montgomery, AL	**L** 3–4	Tovar (9–2)	**Pruitt** (6–4)	None	ESPN+	251	36–22	2–1
May 22	vs. (2); No. 24 Coastal Carolina	(7)	DABOS Park • Montgomery, AL	**W** 5–4	**Herrmann** (7–4)	Norman (6–6)	**Brasch** (6)	ESPN+	787	37–22	3–1
May 23	vs. (6) Texas State	(7)	DABOS Park • Montgomery, AL	**W** 12–6	**Smith** (3–3)	Kerbow (1–1)	None	ESPN+	684	38–22	4–1
May 23	vs. (6) Texas State	(7)	DABOS Park • Montgomery, AL	**W** 7–4	**Pruitt** (7–4)	Tovar (9–3)	**Roman** (1)	ESPN+	867	39–22	5–1
May 24	vs. (1); No. 8 Southern Miss	(7)	DABOS Park • Montgomery, AL	**L** 7–11	Crabtree (2–2)	**Herrmann** (7–5)	None	ESPN+	1,093	39–23	5–2

Starkville Regional (2–2)
Date	Opponent	Seed	Site/stadium	Score	Win	Loss	Save	TV	Attendance	Overall record	NCAAT record
May 29	vs. (2); No. 24 Cincinnati	(3); No. 25	Dudy Noble Field • Starkville, MS	**L** 2–12	Taylor (7–3)	**Brasch** (6–3)	None	ESPN+	8,662	39–24	0–1
May 30	vs. (4) Lipscomb	(3); No. 25	Dudy Noble Field • Starkville, MS	**W** 10–4	**Smith** (4–3)	Trautner (1–4)	None	ESPN+	8,644	40–24	1–1
May 31	vs. (2); No. 24 Cincinnati	(3); No. 25	Dudy Noble Field • Starkville, MS	**W** 8–6	**Papenbrock** (4–0)	Blue (4–2)	None	ESPN+	8,509	41–24	2–1
May 31	vs. (1); No. 17 Mississippi State	(3); No. 25	Dudy Noble Field • Starkville, MS	**L** 5–19	McPherson (4–1)	**Pruitt** (7–5)	None	ESPN+	9,901	41–25	2–2

Schedule source:

*Rankings are based on the team's current ranking in the D1Baseball poll.

== Starkville Regional ==
Starkville Regional Teams
(1) Mississippi State Bulldogs	(2) Cincinnati Bearcats	(3) Louisiana Ragin' Cajuns	(4) Lipscomb Bisons

First Round
1	Mississippi State	10
4	Lipscomb	1
3	Louisiana	2
2	Cincinnati	12
Lower round 1
4	Lipscomb	4
3	Louisiana	10

Semi-Finals
1	Mississippi State	10
2	Cincinnati	5
Lower final
2	Cincinnati	6
3	Louisiana	8

Finals
1	Mississippi State	19	-
3	Louisiana	5	-

== Rankings ==
Ranking movements Legend: ██ Increase in ranking ██ Decrease in ranking — = Not ranked RV = Received votes
	Week																	
Poll	Pre	1	2	3	4	5	6	7	8	9	10	11	12	13	14	15	16	Final
Coaches'	—	—*	—	—	—	RV	—	—	—	—	—	—	—	—	—	RV	RV*	
Baseball America	—	—	—	—	—	—	—	—	—	—	—	—	—	—	—	—*	—*	
NCBWA†	—	—	—	—	—	25	RV	RV	—	—	—	—	—	—	—	—*	—*	
D1Baseball	—	—	—	—	—	25	—	—	—	—	—	—	—	—	—	25	—*	
Perfect Game	—	—	—	—	—	22	—	—	—	—	—	—	—	—	—	—*	—*	

† NCBWA ranks 30 teams in their preseason poll, but only ranks 25 teams weekly during the season.
* A new poll was not released for this week, so for comparison purposes, the previous week's ranking is inserted in this week's slot.
