= 2026 Troy Trojans baseball team =

American college baseball season

2026 Troy Trojans baseball
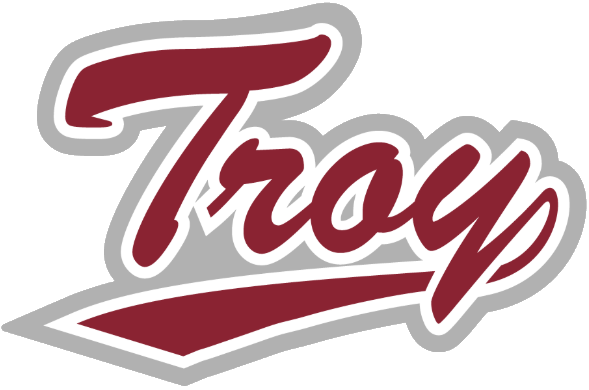

NCAA Gainesville Regional champions NCAA Troy Super Regional champions

College World Series, 1–2
- Conference: Sun Belt Conference

Ranking
- Coaches: No. 8
- D1Baseball.com: No. 8
- Record: 39–32 (17–13 Sun Belt)
- Head coach: Skylar Meade (5th season)
- Assistant coaches: Ben Wolgamot; Ryan Fineman; Adam Godwin
- Home stadium: Riddle–Pace Field

2026 Sun Belt Conference baseball standings
	Conf.				Overall
Team	W		L	PCT	W		L	PCT
No. 24 Southern Miss ‍†‍‡‍^{y}	22	–	8	.733	40	–	14	.741
Coastal Carolina ‍‍‍^{y}	21	–	9	.700	36	–	19	.655
Appalachian State ‍‍‍	17	–	13	.567	30	–	22	.577
No. 8 Troy ‍‍‍^{y}	17	–	13	.567	29	–	27	.518
South Alabama ‍‍‍	17	–	13	.567	33	–	21	.611
Texas State ‍‍‍^{y}	16	–	14	.533	34	–	22	.607
Louisiana ‍‍‍^{y}	16	–	14	.533	34	–	21	.618
Old Dominion ‍‍‍	15	–	15	.500	29	–	25	.537
Georgia State ‍‍‍	14	–	16	.467	26	–	28	.481
Marshall ‍‍‍	13	–	17	.433	23	–	31	.426
Arkansas State ‍‍‍	12	–	18	.400	29	–	24	.547
Louisiana–Monroe ‍‍‍	12	–	18	.400	27	–	28	.491
James Madison ‍‍‍	11	–	19	.367	21	–	32	.396
Georgia Southern ‍‍‍	7	–	23	.233	16	–	40	.286
† – Conference champion ‡ – Tournament champion y – Invited to the NCAA Tournament; As of May 17, 2026; Rankings from D1Baseball

The 2026 Troy Trojans baseball team represented Troy University in the 2026 NCAA Division I baseball season. The Trojans played their home games at Riddle–Pace Field as a member of the Sun Belt Conference. They were led by head coach Skylar Meade, in his fifth year as head coach.

The Trojans entered the season projected to finish third in the conference according to the preseason coaches' poll. They concluded the regular season with a 29–27 record and earned the No. 4 seed in the Sun Belt Conference Tournament. In the conference tournament, Troy posted a 3–2 record, defeating South Alabama twice and Southern Miss once while suffering two losses to Southern Miss. Despite not winning the conference tournament, the Trojans received an at-large bid to the NCAA Tournament and were assigned to the Gainesville Regional. After an opening-round loss to Miami, Troy won four consecutive elimination games, including back-to-back victories over regional host Florida, to claim the regional title and advance to the first Super Regional in program history. The Trojans were subsequently selected to host their Super Regional matchup against Little Rock.

== Previous season ==
The Trojans finished the 2025 season with a record of 39–21, 18–12 in the Sun Belt to finish in third place. Despite being ranked for much of the regular season, the team was not selected for the 2025 NCAA Division I baseball tournament, finishing among the first four teams left out of the field.

== Personnel ==
=== Roster ===
2026 Troy Trojans roster
Pitchers: 10 - Brock Tapper- Senior; 11 - Lucas Litteral - Senior; 12 - Tate Farquhar - Junior; 15 - Tommy Egan - Senior; 16 - Hayden Smith - Junior; 17 - Zach Crotchfelt - Senior; 21 - Blake Dean - Junior; 26 - Matt Dill- Freshman; 27 - Dylan Alonso - Junior; 28 - Jackson Lucas - Freshman; 29 - Dylan King - Senior; 30 - Cooper Ellingworth - Junior; 31 - Benjamin Stubbs - Senior; 35 - Matteo Pare - Junior; 36 - Chase Cartron Sophomore; 38 - Nate Criswell - Junior; 45 - Judah Buckner - Junior; 45 - Noah Thigpen - Sophomore	Catchers: 3 - Cole Garner - Junior; 5 - Jimmy Janicki - Sophomore; 18 - Caden Reeves - Freshman; Infielders: 2 - Aaron Piasecki - Senior; 4 - Nolan Book - Sophomore; 32 - Josh Pyne - (redshirt) Senior; 33 - Ty McGraw - (redshirt) Freshman; 34 - Blake Cavill - Senior; 37 - Sean Darnell - Senior	Outfielders: 1 - Steven Meier - Senior; 7 - Gavin Schrader - Senior; 14 - Zaid Diaz- Junior; 23 - Houston Markham - Sophomore; 44 - Dillon Kuehl - Senior; Utility: 6 - Brady Richardson (INF/RHP) - Freshman; 8 - Jabe Boroff (C/UTL) - Junior; 22 - Drew Nelson (LHP/UTL) - Senior; 40 - Nico Azpilcueta (INF/OF) - Senior; 28 - Brennan Hudson (C/INF/OF) - Senior

=== Coaching staff ===
2026 Troy Trojans coaching staff
Name	Position	Seasons at Troy	Alma Mater
Skylar Meade	Head coach	5	Louisville (2007)
Ben Wolgamot	Associate Head Coach	5	Purdue (2010)
Ryan Fineman	Assistant coach	2	Indiana (2019)
Adam Godwin	Assistant coach	5	Troy (2018)

== Schedule and results ==
2026 Troy Trojans baseball game log (39–32)
Regular Season (29–27)

February (4–6)
Date	Opponent	Rank	Site/Stadium	Score	Win	Loss	Save	TV	Attendance	Overall Record	SBC Record
February 13	at Mercer		OrthoGeorgia Park; Macon, GA	**L** 3–4	Ewaldsen (1–0)	**Crotchfelt (0–1)**	None	ESPN+	1,085	0–1	–
February 14	at Mercer		OrthoGeorgia Park	**L** 5–17^{7}	Hugas (1–0)	**Thigpen (0–1)**	None	ESPN+	788	0–2	–
February 14	at Mercer		OrthoGeorgia Park	**W** 19–3^{7}	**Alonso (1–0)**	Gaspard (0–1)	None	ESPN+	705	1–2	–
February 17	at No. 4 Mississippi State		Dudy Noble Field; Starkville, MS	**L** 7–13	Kirk (1–0)	**Dean (0–1)**	None	SECN+	9,842	1–3	–
February 20	Campbell		Riddle–Pace Field; Troy, AL	**W** 13–3^{8}	**Egan (1–0)**	Wimbish (0–1)	**Alonso (1)**	ESPN+	2,010	2–3	–
February 21	Campbell		Riddle–Pace Field	**L** 1–13^{7}	Clark (1–1)	**Thigpen (0–2)**	None	ESPN+	1,901	2–4	–
February 22	Campbell		Riddle–Pace Field	**W** 8–4	**Crotchfelt (1–1)**	Sabers (0–1)	**Alonso (2)**	ESPN+	1,924	3–4	–
February 25	at No. 11 Georgia		Foley Field; Athens, GA	**W** 6–5^{12}	**Dill** (1–0)	Pruett (0–1)	None	SECN+	985	4–4	–
February 27	vs. Western Carolina		Clark–LeClair Stadium; Greenville, NC	**L** 3–4	Snyder (2–0)	**Ellingworth (0–1)**	Austin (2)	None	4,277	4–5	–
February 28	at East Carolina		Clark–LeClair Stadium	**L** 2–5	Van Kempen (1–1)	**Thigpen (0–3)**	Jenkins (1)	ESPN+	5,372	4–6	–

March (9–10)
Date	Opponent	Rank	Site/Stadium	Score	Win	Loss	Save	TV	Attendance	Overall Record	SBC Record
March 1	vs. Rutgers		Clark–LeClair Stadium	**W** 2–1	**Alonso (2–0)**	Borghese (0–1)	None	None	–	5–6	–
March 4	at Vanderbilt		Hawkins Field; Nashville, TN	**L** 1–4	Schulz (1–0)	**Crotchfelt** (0–1)	Bristow (1)	SECN+	2,735	5–7	–
March 6	Maryland		Riddle–Pace Field	**W** 5–2	**Egan (2–0)**	Williams (1–1)	**Alonso (3)**	ESPN+	2,187	6–7	–
March 7	Maryland		Riddle–Pace Field	**L** 3–9	Morlang (2–2)	**Thigpen (0–4)**	Hastings (2)	ESPN+	2,510	6–8	–
March 8	Maryland		Riddle–Pace Field	**L** 6–7	Ryan (2–0)	**Tapper** (0–1)	Bailey (1)	ESPN+	1,712	6–9	–
March 10	at Alabama		Sewell–Thomas Stadium; Tuscaloosa, AL	**L** 3–7	Alcock (2–0)	**Cartron** (0–1)	None	SECN+	4,423	6–10	–
March 13	Old Dominion		Riddle–Pace Field	**L** 8–10	Johnson (1–0)	**Egan** (2–1)	None	ESPN+	1,955	6–11	0–1
March 14	Old Dominion		Riddle–Pace Field	**W** 13–4	**Stubbs** (1–0)	Kuskie (2–3)	None	ESPN+	2,135	7–11	1–1
March 15	Old Dominion		Riddle–Pace Field	**W** 9–4	**Alonso** (3–0)	Gatti (0–3)	None	ESPN+	1,910	8–11	2–1
March 17	at Alabama State		Wheeler–Watkins Baseball Complex; Montgomery, AL	**W** 11–2	**Dill** (2–0)	Baptist (1–4)	None	SWACTV	–	9–11	–
March 20	at No. 12 Southern Miss		Pete Taylor Park; Hattiesburg, MS	**W** 6–5	**Stubbs** (2–0)	Harris (4–1)	Ellingworth (1)	ESPN+	5,341	10–11	3–1
March 21	at No. 12 Southern Miss		Pete Taylor Park	**L** 5–11	Sivley (3–0)	**Alonso** (3–1)	None	ESPN+	5,457	10–12	3–2
March 22	at No. 12 Southern Miss		Pete Taylor Park	**L** 4–5	Clark (4–0)	**Elingworth** (0–2)	None	ESPN+	5,187	10–13	3–3
March 24	Samford		Riddle–Pace Field	**L** 2–7	O'Beirne (1–0)	**Dill** (2–1)	Whitney (1)	ESPN+	2,465	10–14	–
March 25	at Florida A&M		Moore–Kittles Field; Tallahassee, FL	**W** 7–4	**Tapper** (1–1)	Lindsey (0–2)	**Ellingworth** (2)	None	200	11–14	–
March 27	at Georgia Southern		J. I. Clements Stadium; Statesboro, GA	**L** 3–4	Pendley (2–3)	Ellingworth (0–3)	None	ESPN+	1,653	11–15	3–4
March 28	at Georgia Southern		J. I. Clements Stadium	**L** 0–10^{8}	Degondea (1–2)	**Alonso** (3–2)	None	ESPN+	2,458	11–16	3–5
March 29	at Georgia Southern		J. I. Clements Stadium	**W** 11–5	**Egan** (3–1)	Garrett (1–5)	**Ellington** (3)	ESPN+	1,725	12–16	4–5
March 31	Alabama State		Riddle–Pace Field	**W** 14–2^{7}	**Smith** (1–0)	Sanders (0–1)	None	ESPN+	1,855	13–16	–

April (9–7)
Date	Opponent	Rank	Site/Stadium	Score	Win	Loss	Save	TV	Attendance	Overall Record	SBC Record
April 2	Arkansas State		Riddle–Pace Field	**W** 6–4	**Stubbs** (3–0)	Richter (2–3)	**Alonso** (4)	ESPN+	2,072	14–16	5–5
April 3	Arkansas State		Riddle–Pace Field	**L** 4–6	Foss (2–0)	**Dill** (2–2)	Garrison (5)	ESPN+	1,984	14–17	5–6
April 4	Arkansas State		Riddle–Pace Field	**W** 6–4	**Ellingworth** (1–3)	Weimer (3–1)	**Alonso** (5)	ESPN+	1,921	15–17	6–6
April 8	Florida A&M		Riddle–Pace Field	**W** 12–2^{7}	**Dean** (1–1)	Lindsey (0–3)	None	ESPN+	1,532	16–17	–
April 10	at Texas State		Bobcat Ballpark; San Marcos, TX	**L** 5–8	Smith (3–0)	**Alonso** (3–3)	None	ESPN+	1,328	16–18	6–7
April 11	at Texas State		Bobcat Ballpark	**W** 15–2^{7}	**Egan** (4–1)	Tovar (6–2)	None	ESPN+	1,427	17–18	7–7
April 11	at Texas State		Bobcat Ballpark	**W** 12–11^{11}	**Nelson** (1–0)	Markwardt (1–2)	None	ESPN+	1,427	18–18	8–7
April 14	at New Orleans		Maestri Field; New Orleans, LA	**L** 10–11^{10}	Jones (2–1)	**Nelson** (1–1)	None	ESPN+	659	18–19	–
April 17	Louisiana		Riddle–Pace Field	**W** 7–6	**Crotchfelt** (2–2)	Roman (2–4)	None	ESPN+	2,128	19–19	9–7
April 18	Louisiana		Riddle–Pace Field	**L** 6–7	Herrmann (5–2)	**Egan** (4–2)	Carter (3)	ESPN+	2,866	19–20	9–8
April 19	Louisiana		Riddle–Pace Field	**W** 15–11	**Nelson** (2–1)	Carter (1–1)	None	ESPN+	2,094	20–20	10–8
April 21	Jacksonville State		Riddle–Pace Field	**L** 4–5	Horst (3–0)	**Thigpen** (0–5)	Hutto (10)	ESPN+	2,361	20–21	–
April 24	at Marshall		Jack Cook Field; Huntington, WV	**L** 4–7	Blevins (8–2)	**Stubbs** (3–1)	None	ESPN+	1,575	20–22	10–9
April 25	at Marshall		Jack Cook Field	**W** 8–2	**Egan** (5–2)	Harlow (3–5)	None	ESPN+	1,363	21–22	11–9
April 26	at Marshall		Jack Cook Field	**W** 1–0	**Smith** (2–0)	Collins (2–4)	**Ellingworth** (4)	ESPN+	1,356	22–22	12–9
April 28	No. 5 Georgia		Foley Field	**L** 1–11^{7}	Stephens (1–0)	**Tapper** (1–2)	Nottingham (1)	SECN+	3,279	22–23	–

May (7–4)
Date	Opponent	Rank	Site/Stadium	Score	Win	Loss	Save	TV	Attendance	Overall Record	SBC Record
May 2	Appalachian State		Riddle–Pace Field	**L** 7–13	Wilson (3–1)	**Stubbs** (3–2)	None	ESPN+	2,310	22–24	12–10
May 2	Appalachian State		Riddle–Pace Field	**L** 0–5	Peterson (7–0)	**Egan** (5–3)	None	ESPN+	2,346	22–25	12–11
May 3	Appalachian State		Riddle–Pace Field	**W** 10–3	**Nelson** (3–1)	Tibbett (1–3)	**Alonso** (6)	ESPN+	2,418	23–25	13–11
May 5	No. 19 Alabama		Riddle–Pace Field	**W** 6–1	**Dill** (3–2)	Lehman (1–1)	**Thigpen** (1)	ESPN+	3,982	24–25	–
May 8	South Alabama		Riddle–Pace Field	**L** 1–12^{7}	Heer (5–2)	**Stubbs** (3–3)	None	ESPN+	2,083	24–26	13–12
May 9	South Alabama		Riddle–Pace Field	**W** 10–5	**Crotchfelt** (3–2)	Bozenhard (2–3)	None	ESPN+	2,262	25–26	14–12
May 10	South Alabama		Riddle–Pace Field	**W** 8–1	**Smith** (3–0)	Gonzalez (4–3)	None	ESPN+	2,096	26–26	15–12
May 12	at UAB		Young Memorial Field; Birmingham, AL	**W** 14–5	**Dill** (4–2)	House (0–1)	None	ESPN+	350	27–26	–
May 14	at Louisiana–Monroe		Lou St. Amant Field; Monroe, LA	**W** 6–4	**Stubbs** (4–3)	Corley (2–3)	**Alonso** (7)	ESPN+	1,278	28–26	16–12
May 15	at Louisiana–Monroe		Lou St. Amant Field	**L** 2–12^{7}	Dermody (5–6)	**Egan** (5–4)	None	ESPN+	1,498	28–27	16–13
May 16	at Louisiana–Monroe		Lou St. Amant Field	**W** 13–3^{7}	**Alonso** (4–3)	Hess (2–6)	None	ESPN+	1,698	29–27	17–13

Postseason (10–5)

Sun Belt Tournament (3–2)
Date	Opponent	Seed	Site/stadium	Score	Win	Loss	Save	TV	Attendance	Overall record	SBCT Record
May 21	vs. (5) South Alabama	(4)	Dabos Park; Montgomery, AL	**W** 11–3	**Crotchfelt** (4–2)	Gonzalez (4–4)	None	ESPN+	375	30–27	1–0
May 22	vs. (1) No. 8 Southern Miss	(4)	Dabos Park	**L** 6–7	Och (6–2)	**Ellingworth** (1–4)	None	ESPN+	650	30–28	1–1
May 23	vs. (5) South Alabama	(4)	Dabos Park	**W** 11–10	**Smith** (4–0)	Smith (2–1)	None	ESPN+	542	31–28	2–1
May 23	vs. (1) No. 8 Southern Miss	(4)	Dabos Park	**W** 9–6	**Crotchfelt** (5–2)	Sunstrom (6–4)	**Egan** (1)	ESPN+	692	32–28	3–1
May 24	vs. (1) No. 8 Southern Miss	(4)	Dabos Park	**L** 2–6	Allen (7–1)	**Nelson** (3–2)	None	ESPN+	732	32–29	3–2

NCAA tournament: Gainesville Regional (4–1)
Date	Opponent	Seed	Site/stadium	Score	Win	Loss	Save	TV	Attendance	Overall record	Regional record
May 29	vs. (2) Miami (FL)	(3)	Condron Ballpark; Gainesville, FL	**L** 5–10	Glidewell (4–0)	**Egan** (5–5)	None	ACCN	3,543	32–30	0–1
May 30	vs. (4) Rider	(3)	Condron Ballpark	**W** 15–7	**Crotchfelt** (6–2)	Poliey (3–2)	None	ESPN+	3,382	33–30	1–1
May 31	vs. (2) Miami (FL)	(3)	Condron Ballpark	**W** 9–6	**Crotchfelt** (7–2)	Dorn (5–2)	None	ACCN	–	34–30	2–1
May 31	at (1) No. 10 Florida	(3)	Condron Ballpark	**W** 16–11	**Ellingworth** (2–4)	Peterson (3–6)	None	ESPN+	4,751	35–30	3–1
June 1	at (1) No. 10 Florida	(3)	Condron Ballpark	**W** 10–2	**Stubbs** (5–3)	Walls (3–3)	**Thigpen** (2)	SECN	4,637	36–30	4–1

NCAA tournament: Troy Super Regional (2–0)
Date	Opponent	Rank	Stadium Site	Score	Win	Loss	Save	TV	Attendance	Overall Record	Super Reg. Record
June 5	Little Rock		Riddle–Pace Field	**W** 12–2	**Stubbs** (6–3)	Westmoreland (6–3)	None	ESPNU	6,426	37–30	1–0
June 6	Little Rock		Riddle–Pace Field	**W** 7–2	**Egan** (6–5)	Bronzini (2–3)	**Thigpen** (3)	ESPN2	7,033	38–30	2–0

Men's College World Series (1–2)
Date	Opponent	Rank	Stadium Site	Score	Win	Loss	Save	TV	Attendance	Overall Record	CWS Record
June 12	vs. (16) No. 9 West Virginia		Charles Schwab Field Omaha; Omaha, Nebraska	**L** 5–7	Korn (6–1)	**Crotchfelt** (7–3)	McDougal (1)	ESPN	24,154	38–31	0–1
June 14	vs. No. 18 Ole Miss		Charles Schwab Field Omaha	**W** 12–8	**Thigpen** (1–5)	Robertson (5–2)	None	ESPN	24,013	39–31	1–1
June 16	vs. (16) No. 9 West Virginia		Charles Schwab Field Omaha	**L** 0–12	Montesa (6–5)	**Ellingworth** (2–5)	None	ESPN	21,814	39–32	1–2

Legend: = Win = Loss = Canceled
Bold = Troy team member
Rankings are based on the team's current ranking in the D1Baseball poll.
