= 2026 Sun Belt Conference baseball tournament =

- Teams: 10
- Format: Double-elimination
- Finals site: Dabos Park & Riddle–Pace Field; Montgomery, Alabama & Troy, Alabama
- Champions: Southern Miss (3rd title)
- Winning coach: Christian Ostrander (2nd title)
- MVP: Joey Urban (Southern Miss)
- Television: ESPN+

2026 Sun Belt Conference baseball standings
	Conf.				Overall
Team	W		L	PCT	W		L	PCT
No. 24 Southern Miss ‍†‍‡‍^{y}	22	–	8	.733	40	–	14	.741
Coastal Carolina ‍‍‍^{y}	21	–	9	.700	36	–	19	.655
Appalachian State ‍‍‍	17	–	13	.567	30	–	22	.577
No. 8 Troy ‍‍‍^{y}	17	–	13	.567	29	–	27	.518
South Alabama ‍‍‍	17	–	13	.567	33	–	21	.611
Texas State ‍‍‍^{y}	16	–	14	.533	34	–	22	.607
Louisiana ‍‍‍^{y}	16	–	14	.533	34	–	21	.618
Old Dominion ‍‍‍	15	–	15	.500	29	–	25	.537
Georgia State ‍‍‍	14	–	16	.467	26	–	28	.481
Marshall ‍‍‍	13	–	17	.433	23	–	31	.426
Arkansas State ‍‍‍	12	–	18	.400	29	–	24	.547
Louisiana–Monroe ‍‍‍	12	–	18	.400	27	–	28	.491
James Madison ‍‍‍	11	–	19	.367	21	–	32	.396
Georgia Southern ‍‍‍	7	–	23	.233	16	–	40	.286
† – Conference champion ‡ – Tournament champion y – Invited to the NCAA Tournament; As of May 17, 2026; Rankings from D1Baseball

The 2026 Sun Belt Conference baseball tournament was held at Dabos Park in Montgomery, Alabama from May 19 to May 24. The tournament used a double-elimination format as in past years. Southern Miss won the tournament and earned the Sun Belt Conference's automatic bid to the 2026 NCAA Division I baseball tournament.

== Seeding and format ==
Since 2017, the top ten teams (based on conference results) from the conference earn are invited to the tournament. The teams will be seeded based on conference winning percentage, with the bottom four seeds competing in a play-in round. The remaining eight teams will then play a two bracket, double-elimination tournament. The winner of each bracket will play a championship final.

== Results ==
=== Play-in Round ===
Tuesday, May 19
Team	R
#10 Marshall	1
#7 Louisiana	11^{(7)}
Notes: Marshall eliminated

Tuesday, May 19
Team	R
#9 Georgia State	17^{(7)}
#8 Old Dominion	1
Notes: Old Dominion eliminated

=== Double-Elimination Round ===
First round
1	Southern Miss	7
9	Georgia State	6
4	Troy	11
5	South Alabama	3
9	Georgia State	4
5	South Alabama	7
2	Coastal Carolina	11
7	Louisiana	12
3	Appalachian State	5
6	Texas State	6
3	Appalachian State	2
2	Coastal Carolina	8

Second round
1	Southern Miss	7
4	Troy	6
5	South Alabama	10
4	Troy	11
7	Louisiana	3
6	Texas State	4
2	Coastal Carolina	4
7	Louisiana	5

Semifinals
1	Southern Miss	6	6
4	Troy	9	2
6	Texas State	6	4
7	Louisiana	12	7

Finals
1	Southern Miss	11
7	Louisiana	7

== Schedule ==
Game	Time*	Matchup^{#}	Score	Notes	Reference
Tuesday, May 19
1	3:00pm	No. 7 Louisiana vs No. 10 Marshall	11–1^{7}	Marshall eliminated	
2	6:30pm	No. 8 Old Dominion vs No. 9 Georgia State	1–17^{7}	Old Dominion eliminated	
Wednesday, May 20
3	9:00am	No. 3 Appalachian State vs No. 6 Texas State	5–6		
4	12:30pm	No. 2 Coastal Carolina vs No. 7 Louisiana	11–12		
5	4:00pm	No. 1 Southern Miss vs No. 9 Georgia State	7–6		
Thursday, May 21
6	9:00am	No. 4 Troy vs No. 5 South Alabama	11–3		
7	12:30pm	No. 3 Appalachian State vs No. 2 Coastal Carolina	2–8	Appalachian State Eliminated	
8	4:00pm	No. 9 Georgia State vs No. 5 South Alabama	4–7	Georgia State Eliminated	
9	7:30pm	No. 6 Texas State vs No. 7 Louisiana	4–3		
Friday, May 22
10	11:00am	No. 1 Southern Miss vs No. 4 Troy	7–6		
11	3:00pm	No. 2 Coastal Carolina vs No. 7 Louisiana	4–5	Coastal Carolina Eliminated	
Saturday, May 23
12	9:00am	No. 5 South Alabama vs No. 4 Troy	10–11	South Alabama Eliminated	
13	10:00am	No. 6 Texas State vs No. 7 Louisiana	6–12		
14	2:10pm	No. 1 Southern Miss vs No. 4 Troy	6–9		
15	7:00pm	No. 7 Louisiana vs No. 6 Texas State	7–4	Texas State Eliminated	
Sunday, May 24
16	9:00am	No. 4 Troy vs No. 1 Southern Miss	2–6	Troy Eliminated	
17	1:30pm	No. 7 Louisiana vs No. 1 Southern Miss	7–11	Southern Miss Wins the Sun Belt Championship	
*Game times in CDT. # – Rankings denote tournament seed.
