= 2026 Texas State Bobcats baseball team =

College Baseball Season

2026 Texas State Bobcats baseball

College Station Regional, 1–2
- Conference: Sun Belt Conference
- Record: 37–26 (16–14 SBC)
- Head coach: Steven Trout (7th season)
- Assistant coaches: Danny-David Linahan; Brandon Gowins
- Home stadium: Bobcat Ballpark

2026 Sun Belt Conference baseball standings
	Conf.				Overall
Team	W		L	PCT	W		L	PCT
No. 7 Southern Miss ‍†‍‡‍^{y}	22	–	8	.733	40	–	14	.741
Coastal Carolina ‍‍‍^{y}	21	–	9	.700	36	–	19	.655
Appalachian State ‍‍‍	17	–	13	.567	30	–	22	.577
Troy ‍‍‍^{y}	17	–	13	.567	29	–	27	.518
South Alabama ‍‍‍	17	–	13	.567	33	–	21	.611
Texas State ‍‍‍^{y}	16	–	14	.533	34	–	22	.607
No. 25 Louisiana ‍‍‍^{y}	16	–	14	.533	34	–	21	.618
Old Dominion ‍‍‍	15	–	15	.500	29	–	25	.537
Georgia State ‍‍‍	14	–	16	.467	26	–	28	.481
Marshall ‍‍‍	13	–	17	.433	23	–	31	.426
Arkansas State ‍‍‍	12	–	18	.400	29	–	24	.547
Louisiana–Monroe ‍‍‍	12	–	18	.400	27	–	28	.491
James Madison ‍‍‍	11	–	19	.367	21	–	32	.396
Georgia Southern ‍‍‍	7	–	23	.233	16	–	40	.286
† – Conference champion ‡ – Tournament champion y – Invited to the NCAA Tournament; As of May 17, 2026; Rankings from D1Baseball

The 2026 Texas State Bobcats baseball team represents Texas State University during the 2026 NCAA Division I baseball season. The Bobcats play their home games at Bobcat Ballpark in San Marcos, Texas and are led by seventh-year head coach Steven Trout. They are a member of the Sun Belt Conference (SBC).

== Preseason ==
=== Signing Day Recruits ===
Player	Hometown	Previous Team
Pitchers
Hitters

=== Sun Belt Conference Coaches Poll ===
The Sun Belt Conference Coaches Poll was released on February 4, 2026. Texas State was picked to finish sixth with 114 votes.

Coaches poll
Predicted finish	Team	Votes (1st place)
1	Coastal Carolina	194 (12)
2	Southern Miss	182 (1)
3	Troy	166
4	Marshall	129
5	Louisiana	126 (1)
6	Texas State	114
T7	Georgia Southern	104
T7	Old Dominion	104
9	Arkansas State	96
10	Appalachian State	78
11	South Alabama	62
12	Georgia Southern	49
13	James Madsion	48
14	Louisiana–Monroe ‍	18

== Roster ==
2026 Texas State Bobcats roster
Pitchers	Catchers Infielders	Outfielders	Two Way Players

=== Coaches ===
2026 Texas State Bobcats baseball coaching staff
- Steven Trout – Head coach – 7th season
- Danny-David Linahan – Assistant coach – 2nd season
- Brandon Gowins – Assistant coach – 1st season

Note: Season counter accounts for all stints at Texas State.

== Personnel ==
=== Starters ===
Opening Night Lineup
Pos.	No.	Player.	Year
--	--	--	--
--	--	--	--
--	--	--	--
--	--	--	--
--	--	--	--
--	--	--	--
--	--	--	--
--	--	--	--
--	--	--	--

Weekend pitching rotation
Day	No.	Player.	Year
Friday	--	--	--
Saturday	--	--	--
Sunday	--	--	--

== Schedule and results ==
2026 Texas State Bobcats baseball game log (Overall: 37–26; Conference: 16–14); (Home: 24–10; Away: 7–13; Neutral: 6–3)
Regular season (34–22)
February (9–2)
(Home: 6–1; Away: 0–1; Neutral: 2–0)

Date	Time (CST)	Opponent	Rank	TV	Venue	Score	Win	Loss	Save	Attendance	Overall record	SBC record

March (11–7)
(Home:7–2; Away: 3–5; Netural: 1–0)

Date	Time (CST)	Opponent	Rank	TV	Venue	Score	Win	Loss	Save	Attendance	Overall record	SBC record

April (8–9)
(Home:7–4; Away: 1–5)

Date	Time (CST)	Opponent	Rank	TV	Venue	Score	Win	Loss	Save	Attendance	Overall record	SBC record

May (7–4)
(Home: 4–3; Away: 3–1)

Date	Time (CST)	Opponent	Rank	TV	Venue	Score	Win	Loss	Save	Attendance	Overall record	SBC record

Postseason (3–4)
SBC Tournament (2–2)

Date	Time (CST)	Opponent	Rank	TV	Venue	Score	Win	Loss	Save	Attendance	Overall record	SBCT record
May 20	9:00 a.m.	(3) Appalachian State (First Round Upper Bracket)	(6)	ESPN+	Dabos Park • Montgomery, Alabama	**W** 6–5	**Wade Cooper** (6–3)	Gage Peterson (8–1)	**Kyle Froehlich** (2)	331	35–22	1–0
May 21	7:30 p.m.	(7) Louisiana (Second Round Upper Bracket)	(6)	ESPN+	Dabos Park • Montgomery, Alabama	**W** 4–3	**Jesus Tovar** (9–2)	Sawyer Pruitt (6–4)	None	251	36–22	2–0
May 23	10:00 a.m.	(7) Louisiana (Semifinals Game 1)	(6)	ESPN+	Riddle-Pace Field • Troy, Alabama	**L** 6–12	Parker Smith (3–3)	**Dylan Kerbow** (1–1)	None	684	36–23	2–1
May 23	7:00 p.m.	(7) Louisiana (Semifinals Game 2)	(6)	ESPN+	Riddle-Pace Field • Troy,Alabama	**L** 4–7	Sawyer Pruitt (7–4)	**Jesus Tovar** (9–3)	Ty Roman (1)	867	36–24	2–2

College Station Regional (1–1)

Date	Time (CST)	Opponent	Rank	TV	Venue	Score	Win	Loss	Save	Attendance	Overall record	NCAAT record
May 29	8:00 p.m.	(2) USC (Upper Regional Bracket)	(3)	ESPN+	Blue Bell Park • College Station, Texas	**W** 5–4	**Wade Cooper** (7–3)	Troy Adam (1–4)	None	6,956	37–24	1–0
May 30	8:00 p.m.	(1) No. 11 Texas A&M (Upper Winner Regional Bracket)	(3)	ESPN+	Blue Bell Park • College Station, Texas	**L** 2–17	Weston Moss (5–2)	**Jesus Tovar** (9–4)	None	7,061	37–24	1–1
May 31	3:00 p.m.	(2) USC (Lower Regional Loser Bracket - Elimination Game)	(3)	ESPN+	Blue Bell Park • College Station, Texas	**L** 4–15	Sax Matson (2–2)	**Cade Smith** (4–3)	None	6,885	37–25	1–2

"#" represents ranking. All rankings from D1 Baseball Poll on the date of the contest.
"()" represents postseason seeding in the Sun Belt Tournament or NCAA Regional, respectively.
= Win, = Loss, = Canceled/Postponed
Bold = **Texas State Bobcats team member**
* = Non-Conference Game
Schedule Source:

== Rankings ==
Ranking movements
	Week																
Poll	Pre	1	2	3	4	5	6	7	8	9	10	11	12	13	14	15	Final
Coaches'		*															
Baseball America																	
NCBWA†																	

† NCBWA ranks 30 teams in their preseason poll, but only ranks 25 teams weekly during the season.
* A new poll was not released for this week, so for comparison purposes, the previous week's ranking is inserted in this week's slot.
