= Sun Belt Conference baseball tournament =

- Conference baseball championship
- Sport: Baseball
- Conference: Sun Belt Conference
- Number of teams: 10
- Format: Double-elimination tournament
- Current stadium: Montgomery Riverwalk Stadium
- Current location: Montgomery, Alabama
- Played: 1978 (48 years ago) to present
- Last contest: 2026
- Current champion: Southern Miss
- Most championships: South Alabama (13)
- Official website: SunBeltSports.org Baseball

Sponsors
- Golden Flake

The Sun Belt Conference baseball tournament is the conference championship tournament in baseball for the Sun Belt Conference. The winner of the tournament receives the conference's automatic bid to the NCAA Division I baseball tournament. After Coastal Carolina University hosts the competition in Conway, South Carolina, in 2019, the tournament will move to a neutral site, Riverwalk Stadium in Montgomery, AL, from 2020 to 2024.

== Tournament ==
The Sun Belt Conference Baseball Tournament is a ten team double-elimination tournament held annually at various sites in the Sun Belt Conference region. The bottom four seeds play a one round single elimination play in game. The six teams with the best conference record at the end of the regular season earn automatic berths in the tournament. After the play-in round, the remaining eight teams will play 2 four team double-elimination brackets with a single elimination championship game between the bracket winners. The division winner with the best conference record will be seeded #1 and will play the lowest remaining seed from the play-in round. The winner of the other division will receive the #2 seed (regardless of overall conference ranking) and will play the higher seeded play-in game winner. The champion of the competition receives an automatic bid to the NCAA Division I baseball tournament.

== History ==
The tournament started in 1978 as a four team double-elimination tournament.

In 1979 the tournament expanded to include six teams but still remained double-elimination.

The tournament expanded again in 1980 and included seven teams.

In 1981 the conference was divided into divisions and the top two teams in each division made the tournament, returning it to a four team double-elimination format. It remained that way through 1985.

In 1986 the conference retained the division format but expanded the tournament to include the top four teams in each division, making the tournament an eight team double-elimination tournament.

In 1987, the conference returned to the a four team double-elimination format.

The tournament format was changed again in 1988 when it expanded to include the top three teams in each division, now making it a six team double-elimination tournament. In 1995, the conference dropped the division format but kept the tournament format as a six team double-elimination tournament through 1998.

In 1999, the tournament expanded to an eight team double-elimination format. The format was a double bracket round robin in 2011-2012.

In 2017, the Conference expanded the field to 10 teams, with the bottom four seeds playing a single-elimination play-in round before the standard eight team double-elimination bracket.

== Champions ==
=== By Year ===
Year	School	Site	MVP
1978	New Orleans	Mobile, AL	Roy Weimer, New Orleans
1979	New Orleans	Tampa, FL	Mike Quade, New Orleans
1980	South Alabama	Mobile, AL	Pete Otero, South Alabama
1981	South Alabama	Birmingham, AL	Randy Wilson, South Florida
1982	South Florida	Tampa, FL	Randy Wilson, South Florida
1983	South Alabama	Bud Metheny Baseball Complex • Norfolk, VA	Dennis Johnston, South Alabama
1984	South Alabama	Mobile, AL	Pete Coachman, South Alabama
1985	Old Dominion	Bud Metheny Baseball Complex • Norfolk, VA	Rob Tomberlin, Western Kentucky
1986	South Florida	Tampa, FL	Todd Azar, Old Dominion
1987	South Alabama	Bud Metheny Baseball Complex • Norfolk, VA	Mike Maksudian, South Alabama
1988	VCU	Bowling Green, KY	Tim Barker, VCU
1989	Jacksonville	Jacksonville, FL	Rene Francisco, Jacksonville
1990	South Florida	Mobile, AL	Ricky Ware, South Florida
1991	UAB	Jacksonville, FL	Stephen Johnson, UAB
1992	South Alabama	Mobile, AL	Papo Ramos, Southwestern Louisiana
1993	Lamar	Vincent–Beck Stadium • Beaumont, TX	Phil Brassington, Lamar
1994	Arkansas State	Mobile, AL	Keith Horn, Arkansas State
1995	Lamar	Jacksonville, FL	Will Cook, Lamar
1996	South Alabama	Mobile, AL	Seth Taylor, South Alabama
1997	South Alabama	M. L. Tigue Moore Field • Lafayette, LA	Joey Choron, South Alabama
1998	Southwestern Louisiana	Mobile, AL	B.J. Ryan, Southwestern Louisiana
1999	FIU	Metairie, LA	Barry Paulk, FIU
2000	South Alabama	Mobile, AL	Tim Merritt, South Alabama
2001	South Alabama	M. L. Tigue Moore Field • Lafayette, LA	Ryan Mulhern, South Alabama
2002	New Mexico State	Mobile, AL	Hal Bisnett, New Mexico State
2003	Middle Tennessee	M. L. Tigue Moore Field • Lafayette, LA	Chuck Akers, Middle Tennessee
2004	Western Kentucky	Mobile, AL	Grady Hinchman, Western Kentucky
2005	South Alabama	Miami, FL	Josh Morgan, South Alabama
2006	Troy	Bowling Green, KY	Blake Green, Troy
2007	New Orleans	Mobile, AL	Johnny Giavotella, New Orleans
2008	Western Kentucky	M. L. Tigue Moore Field • Lafayette, LA	Jake Wells, Western Kentucky
2009	Middle Tennessee	Troy, AL	Kenneth Roberts, Middle Tennessee
2010	FIU	Murfreesboro, TN	Jeremy Patton, FIU
2011	Arkansas–Little Rock	Monroe, LA	Garret Graziano, Arkansas–Little Rock
2012	Louisiana–Monroe	Bowling Green Ballpark • Bowling Green, KY	Wil Browning, Louisiana–Monroe
2013	Florida Atlantic	M. L. Tigue Moore Field • Lafayette, LA	Brendon Sanger, Florida Atlantic
2014	Louisiana–Lafayette	Eddie Stanky Field • Mobile, AL	Blake Trahan, Louisiana–Lafayette
2015	Louisiana–Lafayette	Riddle–Pace Field • Troy, Alabama	Stefan Trosclair, Louisiana–Lafayette
2016	Louisiana–Lafayette	Bobcat Ballpark • San Marcos, TX	Nick Thurman, Louisiana-Lafayette
2017	South Alabama	J. I. Clements Stadium • Statesboro, GA	Brendan Donovan, South Alabama
2018	Coastal Carolina	M. L. Tigue Moore Field • Lafayette, LA	Zach Biermann, Coastal Carolina
2019	Coastal Carolina	Springs Brooks Stadium • Conway, SC	Kieton Rivers, Coastal Carolina
2020	Cancelled due to the coronavirus pandemic		
2021	South Alabama	Riverwalk Stadium • Montgomery, AL	Miles Smith, South Alabama
2022	Louisiana	Riverwalk Stadium • Montgomery, AL	Jacob Schultz, Louisiana
2023	Southern Miss	Riverwalk Stadium • Montgomery, AL	Tanner Hall, Southern Miss
2024	Southern Miss	Riverwalk Stadium • Montgomery, AL	Colby Allen, Southern Miss
2025	Coastal Carolina	Riverwalk Stadium • Montgomery, AL	Caden Bodine, Coastal Carolina
2026	Southern Miss	Dabos Park • Montgomery, AL	Joey Urban, Southern Miss

=== By school ===
As of July 1, 2022, there are 14 schools in the conference that competes in baseball.

==== Current members ====
School	Tournament Titles	Years
South Alabama	13	1980, 1981, 1983, 1984, 1987, 1992, 1996, 1997, 2000, 2001, 2005, 2017, 2021
Louisiana	5	1998, 2014, 2015, 2016, 2022
Coastal Carolina	3	2018, 2019, 2025
Southern Miss	3	2023, 2024, 2026
Arkansas State	1	1994
Louisiana–Monroe	1	2012
Old Dominion	1	1985
Troy	1	2006

==== Former members ====
School	Tournament Titles	Years
New Orleans	3	1978, 1979, 2007
South Florida	3	1982, 1986, 1990
FIU	2	1999, 2010
Lamar	2	1993, 1995
Middle Tennessee	2	2003, 2009
Western Kentucky	2	2004, 2008
Florida Atlantic	1	2013
Jacksonville	1	1989
Little Rock	1	2011
New Mexico State	1	2002
UAB	1	1991
VCU	1	1988
