= 2026 Appalachian State Mountaineers baseball team =

American college baseball season

2026 Appalachian State Mountaineers baseball
- Conference: Sun Belt Conference
- Record: 30–24 (17–13 SBC)
- Head coach: Kermit Smith (10th season)
- Assistant coaches: Brit Johnson; Heath Blackmon; Seth McLemore
- Home stadium: Beaver Field at Jim and Bettie Smith Stadium

2026 Sun Belt Conference baseball standings
	Conf.				Overall
Team	W		L	PCT	W		L	PCT
No. 24 Southern Miss ‍†‍‡‍^{y}	22	–	8	.733	40	–	14	.741
Coastal Carolina ‍‍‍^{y}	21	–	9	.700	36	–	19	.655
Appalachian State ‍‍‍	17	–	13	.567	30	–	22	.577
No. 8 Troy ‍‍‍^{y}	17	–	13	.567	29	–	27	.518
South Alabama ‍‍‍	17	–	13	.567	33	–	21	.611
Texas State ‍‍‍^{y}	16	–	14	.533	34	–	22	.607
Louisiana ‍‍‍^{y}	16	–	14	.533	34	–	21	.618
Old Dominion ‍‍‍	15	–	15	.500	29	–	25	.537
Georgia State ‍‍‍	14	–	16	.467	26	–	28	.481
Marshall ‍‍‍	13	–	17	.433	23	–	31	.426
Arkansas State ‍‍‍	12	–	18	.400	29	–	24	.547
Louisiana–Monroe ‍‍‍	12	–	18	.400	27	–	28	.491
James Madison ‍‍‍	11	–	19	.367	21	–	32	.396
Georgia Southern ‍‍‍	7	–	23	.233	16	–	40	.286
† – Conference champion ‡ – Tournament champion y – Invited to the NCAA Tournament; As of May 17, 2026; Rankings from D1Baseball

The 2026 Appalachian State Mountaineers baseball team represented Appalachian State University during the 2026 NCAA Division I baseball season. The Mountaineers played their home games at Beaver Field at Jim and Bettie Smith Stadium and were led by tenth-year head coach Kermit Smith. They were members of the Sun Belt Conference.

== Preseason ==
=== Sun Belt Conference Coaches Poll ===
The Sun Belt Conference Coaches Poll was released on February 4, 2026. Appalachian State was picked to finish tenth with 78 votes.

Coaches poll
Predicted finish	Team	Votes (1st place)
1	Coastal Carolina	194 (12)
2	Southern Miss	182 (1)
3	Troy	166
4	Marshall	129
5	Louisiana	126 (1)
6	Texas State	114
T7	Georgia Southern	104
T7	Old Dominion	104
9	Arkansas State	96
10	Appalachian State	78
11	South Alabama	62
12	Georgia State	49
13	James Madison	48
14	ULM	18

=== Preseason All-Sun Belt Team & Honors ===
- Cameron Flukey (CCU, Jr, Pitcher)
- Hayden Johnson (CCU, Jr, Pitcher)
- Colby Allen (USM, Sr, Pitcher)
- Ryan Lynch (CCU, Gr, Pitcher)
- Tucker Stockman (USM, Jr, Catcher)
- Blake Cavill (TROY, Sr, 1st Base)
- Joseph Zamora (APP, Gr, 2nd Base)
- Patrick Engskov (ARST, Sr, Shortstop)
- Chase Mora (TXST, Sr, 3rd Base)
- Ashton Quiller (ARST, RS So, Outfielder)
- Dean Mihos (CCU, Sr, Outfielder)
- Ben Higdon (USM, RS Sr, Outfielder)
- Jimmy Janicki (TROY, So, Utility)
- Kameron Miller (APP, Jr, Designated Hitter)

== Schedule and results ==
2026 Appalachian State Mountaineers baseball game log (30–24)
Legend: = Win = Loss = Canceled Bold = Appalachian State team member
Regular season (30–22)

February (7–3)
Date	Time (ET)	TV	Opponent	Rank	Stadium	Score	Win	Loss	Save	Attend	Overall Record	Sun Belt Record	Sources
Feb. 13	1:00 pm	—	Canisius*	—	L.P. Frans Stadium; Hickory, NC	**W** 5-2	**DiRito** **(1-0)**	Morin (0-1)	**Wilson** **(1)**	368	1-0	—	
Feb. 14 (DH 1)	12:00 pm	—	Canisius*	—	L.P. Frans Stadium	**W** 13-3 (7 inn.)	**Peterson** **(1-0)**	Lopinto (0-1)	—	—	2-0	—	
Feb. 14 (DH 2)	4:00 pm	—	Canisius*	—	L.P. Frans Stadium	**W** 8-5	**Garcia** **(1-0)**	Rogers (0-1)	**Fisher** **(1)**	430	3-0	—	
Feb. 17	4:00 pm	ACCNX	at Duke*	—	Jack Coombs Field; Durham, NC	**L** 5-10	Lemke (1-0)	**Marks** **(0-1)**	—	547	3-1	—	
Feb. 20	2:00 pm	—	North Carolina A&T*	—	Beaver Field at Jim and Bettie Smith Stadium; Boone, NC	**W** 9-3	**Nolan** **(1-0)**	Barrett (0-2)	**DiRito** **(1)**	415	4-1	—	
Feb. 21	1:00 pm	—	North Carolina A&T*	—	L.P. Frans Stadium	**W** 10-0 (7 inn.)	**Peterson** **(2-0)**	Sentell (0-2)	—	366	5-1	—	
Feb. 22	1:00 pm	—	Southern Illinois*	—	L.P. Frans Stadium	**W** 9-8	**Smith** **(1-0)**	Macintosh (0-1)	—	282	6-1	—	
Feb. 25	3:00 pm	—	at ETSU*	—	Thomas Stadium; Johnson City, TN	**W** 8-5	**Tramontana** **(1-0)**	McCarley (0-1)	**DiRito** **(2)**	240	7-1	—	
Feb. 27	6:00 pm	ESPN+	at Gardner-Webb*	—	John Henry Moss Stadium; Boling Springs, NC	**L** 6-7 (12 inn.)	Hobb (1-0)	**DiRito** **(1-1)**	—	348	7-2	—	
Feb. 28	3:00 pm	—	at Gardner-Webb*	—	John Henry Moss Stadium	**L** 10-11	Blaszczak (1-0)	**Fisher** **(0-1)**	—	264	7-3	—	

March (7–10)
Date	Time (ET)	TV	Opponent	Rank	Stadium	Score	Win	Loss	Save	Attend	Overall Record	Sun Belt Record Record	Sources
Mar. 1	1:00 pm	—	at Gardner-Webb*	—	John Henry Moss Stadium	**L** 7-8 (11 inn.)	Hausner (1-0)	**Tibbett** **(0-1)**	—	453	7-4	—	
Mar. 4	4:00	ESPN+	#15 Wake Forest*	—	Beaver Field at Jim and Bettie Smith Stadium	**L** 8-9	Ray (1-0)	**Garcia** **(1-1)**	Jones (6)	1,107	7-5	—	
Mar. 6	4:00 pm	—	at Presbyterian*	—	Presbyterian Baseball Complex; Clinton, SC	**W** 7-5	**Clark** **(1-0)**	Hampton (1-1)	**Smith** **(1)**	129	8-5	—	
Mar. 7	1:00 pm	—	Presbyterian*	—	L.P. Frans Stadium	**W** 13-3 (7 inn.)	**Peterson** **(3-0)**	Charalamous (0-2)	—	212	9-5	—	
Mar. 8	3:00 pm	ESPN+	Presbyterian*	—	Beaver Field at Jim and Bettie Smith Stadium	**W** 13-4	**Nolan** **(2-0)**	Marroquin (0-1)	—	252	10-5	—	
Mar. 10	6:00 pm	ESPN+	Western Carolina*	—	Beaver Field at Jim and Bettie Smith Stadium	**L** 3-13	Fuller (1-0)	**Tibbett** **(0-2)**	—	425	10-6	—	
Mar. 13	6:00 pm	ESPN+	#16 Coastal Carolina	—	Beaver Field at Jim and Bettie Smith Stadium	**L** 6-10	Horn (3-0)	**Smith** **(1-1)**	—	480	10-7	0-1	
Mar. 14	3:00 pm	ESPN+	#16 Coastal Carolina	—	Beaver Field at Jim and Bettie Smith Stadium	**L** 4-7	Lynch (1-0)	**Tramontana** **(1-1)**	Doran (1)	1,119	10-8	0-2	
Mar. 15	11:00 am	ESPN+	#16 Coastal Carolina	—	Beaver Field at Jim and Bettie Smith Stadium	**L** 7-8	Richardson (2-1)	**Clark** **(1-1)**	Horn (2)	373	10-9	0-3	
Mar. 17	—	—	at High Point*	—	George S. Erath Field at Coy O. Williard Baseball Stadium; High Point, NC		**Canceled**		—		—	—	
Mar. 20	6:00 pm	ESPN+	at Old Dominion	—	Bud Metheny Ballpark; Norfolk, VA	**L** 7-13	Johnson (2-0)	**Harris** **(0-1)**	—	248	10-10	0-4	
Mar. 21	3:00 pm	ESPN+	at Old Dominion	—	Bud Metheny Ballpark	**W** 10-3	**Watson** **(1-0)**	Landford (1-1)	—	356	11-10	1-4	
Mar. 22	2:00 pm	ESPN+	at Old Dominion	—	Bud Metheny Ballpark	**W** 10-6	**Wilson** **(1-0)**	Okonkwo (0-1)	**Fisher** **(2)**	293	12-10	2-4	
Mar. 24	6:00 pm	ESPN+	High Point*	—	Beaver Field at Jim and Bettie Smith Stadium	**L** 2-3	Wells (1-1)	**Barozzino** **(0-1)**	Story (3)	809	12-11	2-4	
Mar. 27	7:00 pm	ESPN+	at #11 Southern Miss	—	Pete Taylor Park; Hattiesburg, MS	**L** 5-6	Allen (2-1)	**Wilson** **(1-1)**	Clark (5)	5,359	12-12	2-5	
Mar. 28	3:00 pm	ESPN+	at #11 Southern Miss	—	Pete Taylor Park	**W** 6-2	**Beaty** **(1-0)**	Sivley (0-3)	—	5,303	13-12	3-5	
Mar. 29	2:00 pm	ESPN+	at #11 Southern Miss	—	Pete Taylor Park	**L** 4-13	Armistead (1-0)	**Barozzino** **(0-2)**	—	5,231	13-13	3-6	
Mar. 31	6:00 pm	ESPN+	UNC Asheville*	—	Beaver Field at Jim and Bettie Smith Stadium	**W** 17-7 (8 inn.)	**Harris** **(1-1)**	Woolard (0-1)	—	822	14-13	3-6	

April (12–4)
Date	Time (ET)	TV	Opponent	Rank	Stadium	Score	Win	Loss	Save	Attend	Overall Record	Sun Belt Record	Sources
Apr. 2	6:00 pm	ESPN+	Marshall	—	Beaver Field at Jim and Bettie Smith Stadium	**L** 6-12	Blevins (5-2)	**Barozzino** **(0-3)**	—	576	14-14	3-7	
Apr. 3	6:00 pm	ESPN+	Marshall	—	Beaver Field at Jim and Bettie Smith Stadium	**W** 5-4	**Fisher** **(1-1)**	Krebs (0-2)	—	761	15-14	4-7	
Apr. 4	11:00 am	ESPN+	Marshall	—	Beaver Field at Jim and Bettie Smith Stadium	**W** 10-4	**Peterson** **(4-0)**	Collins (2-2)	—	726	16-14	5-7	
Apr. 7	5:00 pm	ESPN+	at UNC Asheville*	—	Greenwood Baseball Field; Asheville, NC	**W** 18-5	**Tibbett** **(1-2)**	Crum (0-3)	—	257	17-14	5-7	
Apr. 10	6:00 pm	ESPN+	ULM	—	Beaver Field at Jim and Bettie Smith Stadium	**W** 13-5	**DiRito** **(2-1)**	Robinson (1-3)	—	792	18-14	6-7	
Apr. 11	3:00 pm	ESPN+	ULM	—	Beaver Field at Jim and Bettie Smith Stadium	**L** 9-14	Cooper (1-0)	**Watson** **(1-1)**	Hess (5)	1,023	18-15	6-8	
Apr. 12	1:00 pm	ESPN+	ULM	—	Beaver Field at Jim and Bettie Smith Stadium	**W** 12-4	**Nolan** **(3-0)**	Dermody (4-4)	—	537	19-15	7-8	
Apr. 14	5:00 pm	ESPN+	at Western Carolina*	—	Hennon Stadium; Cullowhee, NC	**L** 4-14 (7 inn.)	Austin (2-0)	**Barozzino** **(0-3)**	—	811	19-16	7-8	
Apr. 17	6:00 pm	ESPN+	at James Madison	—	Eagle Field at Veterans Memorial Park; Harrisonburg, VA	**W** 10-0	**DiRito** **(3-0)**	Kuhle (0-3)	—	676	20-16	8-8	
Apr. 18	4:00 pm	ESPN+	at James Madison	—	Eagle Field at Veterans Memorial Park	**W** 19-10	**Peterson** **(5-0)**	Alexander (3-3)	—	762	21-16	9-8	
Apr. 19	1:00 pm	ESPN+	at James Madison	—	Eagle Field at Veterans Memorial Park	**W** 14-10	**Nolan** **(4–0)**	Lutz (2–3)	**Fisher** **(3)**	400	22–16	10–8	
Apr. 21	6:00 pm	ESPN+	ETSU*	—	Beaver Field at Jim and Bettie Smith Stadium	**W** 3–1	**Tramontana** **(2-1)**	Scott (2-4)	**Beaty** **(1)**	713	23-16	10–8	
Apr. 24	6:00 pm	ESPN+	Georgia Southern	—	Beaver Field at Jim and Bettie Smith Stadium	**W** 16–3 (7 inn.)	**DiRito** **(4–1)**	Holder (1–4)	—	806	24-16	11–8	
Apr. 25	6:00 pm	ESPN+	Georgia Southern	—	Beaver Field at Jim and Bettie Smith Stadium	**W** 11–5	**Peterson** **(6-0)**	DeGondea (1–4)	—	419	25–16	12-8	
Apr. 26	1:00 pm	ESPN+	Georgia Southern	—	Beaver Field at Jim and Bettie Smith Stadium	**W** 7–3	**Wilson** **(2-1)**	Mason (2–3)	**Fisher** **(4)**	664	26-16	13-8	
Apr. 28	6:00 pm	—	vs. Wake Forest*	—	Keeter Stadium; Shelby, NC	**L** 2-3	Middleton (4-3)	**Tramontana** **(2-2)**	Mummau (3)	3,500	26-17	13-8	

May (4–5)
Date	Time (ET)	TV	Opponent	Rank	Stadium	Score	Win	Loss	Save	Attend	Overall Record	Sun Belt Record	Sources
May 2 (DH 1)	2:00 pm	ESPN+	at Troy	—	Riddle-Pace Field; Troy, AL	**W** 13–7	**Wilson** **(3–1)**	Stubbs (3–2)	—	2,310	27–17	14–8	
May 2 (DH 2)	6:00 pm	ESPN+	at Troy	—	Riddle-Pace Field	**W** 5–0	**Peterson** **(7–0)**	Egan (5–3)	—	2,346	28–17	15–8	
May 3	2:00 pm	ESPN+	at Troy	—	Riddle-Pace Field	**L** 3–10	Nelson (3–1)	**Tibbett** **(1–3)**	Alonso (6)	2,418	28-18	15–9	
May 8	6:00 pm	ESPN+	Louisiana	—	Beaver Field at Jim and Bettie Smith Stadium	**L** 4–5 (10 inn.)	Pruitt (6–3)	**Wilson** **(3–2)**	—	594	28-19	15-10	
May 9	3:00 pm	ESPN+	Louisiana	—	Beaver Field at Jim and Bettie Smith Stadium	**W** 7–2	**Peterson** **(8–0)**	Herrmann (6–3)	—	910	29-19	16-10	
May 10	1:00 pm	ESPN+	Louisiana	—	Beaver Field at Jim and Bettie Smith Stadium	**L** 3–12	Roman (3–4)	**Nolan** **(4–1)**	—	654	29-20	16-11	
May 14	6:00 pm	ESPN+	at Georgia State	—	GSU Baseball Complex; Decatur, GA	**W** 12–2	**DiRito** **(5–1)**	Bartkoski (5–2)	**Tramontana** **(1)**	158	30-20	17–11	
May 15	6:00 pm	ESPN+	at Georgia State	—	GSU Baseball Complex	**L** 2–4	Caruso (7–6)	**Wilson** **(3–3)**	Crooms (1)	215	30-21	17-12	
May 16	1:00 pm	ESPN+	at Georgia State	—	GSU Baseball Complex	**L** 2–3	Holbrook (2–1)	**Harris** **(1–2)**	Crooms (2)	183	30-22	17-13	

Postseason (0–2)

Sun Belt Tournament (0–2)
Date	Time (ET)	TV	Opponent	Seed	Stadium	Score	Win	Loss	Save	Attend	Overall Record	Tourney Record	Sources
May 20	10:00 am	ESPN+	vs. (6) Texas State	(3)	DABOS Park; Montgomery, AL	**L** 5–6	Cooper (6–3)	**Peterson** **(8–1)**	Froehlich (2)	331	30–23	0–1	
May 21	1:30 pm	ESPN+	vs. (2) #24 Coastal Carolina	(3)	DABOS Park	**L** 2–8	Horn (8–1)	**DiRito** **(5–2)**	—	342	30–24	0–2	

* indicates a non-conference game.
(#) All rankings from D1 Baseball Poll on the date of the contest.
