= Christian Ostrander =

American baseball coach

Current position
- Title: Head coach
- Team: Southern Miss
- Conference: Sun Belt
- Record: 134–53

Coaching career (HC unless noted)
- 1998–2002: Delta State (PC/RC)
- 2003–2006: Arkansas State (PC/RC)
- 2007–2008: Gulfport High School
- 2009–2015: Jones College
- 2016–2017: Louisiana Tech (AHC)
- 2018: Southern Miss (PC)
- 2019–2023: Southern Miss (AHC)
- 2024–present: Southern Miss

Head coaching record
- Overall: 134–53 (NCAA); 250–110 (NJCAA)
- Tournaments: NCAA: 5–7; Sun Belt: 11–2

Accomplishments and honors

Championships
- Sun Belt Tournament (2024); Sun Belt regular season (2026); 2× MACJC state championships (2011, 2014); MACJC South Division regular season (2010)

Awards
- Sun Belt Coach of the Year (2026); 2× CUSA Assistant Coach of the Year (2021, 2022)

Christian Ostrander is an American college baseball coach, currently serving as head coach of the Southern Miss Golden Eagles baseball program.

== Coaching career ==
Coach Ostrander was named head coach of the Southern Miss Golden Eagles at the conclusion of the 2023 season, following the retirement of Scott Berry. In his first season as the head coach he led Southern Miss to a conference tournament championship and a berth in the NCAA tournament.

== Head coaching record ==
Record table
Season	Team	Overall	Conference	Standing	Postseason
Jones College (Mississippi Association of Community Colleges Conference) (2009–2015)
2009	Jones College	36–16	14–10		
2010	Jones College	38–12	17–7		
2011	Jones College	46–17	19–5		
2012	Jones College	29–19	17–9		
2013	Jones College	28–18	15–9		
2014	Jones College	46–11	18–6		
2015	Jones College	30–16	17–11		
Jones College (NJCAA):		250–110 (.694)	117–57 (.672)		
Southern Miss (Sun Belt Conference) (2024–present)
2024	Southern Miss	43–20	20–10	2nd	NCAA Regional
2025	Southern Miss	47–16	24–6	2nd	NCAA Regional
2025	Southern Miss	44–17	22–8	1st	NCAA Regional
Southern Miss:		134–53 (.717)	66–24 (.733)		
Total:		134–53 (.717)			
National champion Postseason invitational champion Conference regular season champion Conference regular season and conference tournament champion Division regular season champion Division regular season and conference tournament champion Conference tournament champion
