= 2026 Southern Miss Golden Eagles baseball team =

American college baseball season

2026 Southern Miss Golden Eagles baseball

Sun Belt regular season and tournament champions Round Rock Classic champions

NCAA Hattiesburg Regional, 0–2
- Conference: Sun Belt Conference

Ranking
- Coaches: No. 17
- D1Baseball.com: No. 24
- Record: 44–17 (22–8 SBC)
- Head coach: Christian Ostrander (3rd season)
- Assistant coaches: Ladd Rhodes (3rd season); Travis Creel (7th season)
- Hitting coach: Ben Brewer (5th season)
- Pitching coach: Gunner Leger (1st season)
- Home stadium: Pete Taylor Park

2026 Sun Belt Conference baseball standings
	Conf.				Overall
Team	W		L	PCT	W		L	PCT
No. 24 Southern Miss ‍†‍‡‍^{y}	22	–	8	.733	40	–	14	.741
Coastal Carolina ‍‍‍^{y}	21	–	9	.700	36	–	19	.655
Appalachian State ‍‍‍	17	–	13	.567	30	–	22	.577
No. 8 Troy ‍‍‍^{y}	17	–	13	.567	29	–	27	.518
South Alabama ‍‍‍	17	–	13	.567	33	–	21	.611
Texas State ‍‍‍^{y}	16	–	14	.533	34	–	22	.607
Louisiana ‍‍‍^{y}	16	–	14	.533	34	–	21	.618
Old Dominion ‍‍‍	15	–	15	.500	29	–	25	.537
Georgia State ‍‍‍	14	–	16	.467	26	–	28	.481
Marshall ‍‍‍	13	–	17	.433	23	–	31	.426
Arkansas State ‍‍‍	12	–	18	.400	29	–	24	.547
Louisiana–Monroe ‍‍‍	12	–	18	.400	27	–	28	.491
James Madison ‍‍‍	11	–	19	.367	21	–	32	.396
Georgia Southern ‍‍‍	7	–	23	.233	16	–	40	.286
† – Conference champion ‡ – Tournament champion y – Invited to the NCAA Tournament; As of May 17, 2026; Rankings from D1Baseball

The 2026 Southern Miss Golden Eagles baseball team represents University of Southern Mississippi during the 2026 NCAA Division I baseball season. The Golden Eagles are coached by third-year head coach, Christian Ostrander, and play their home games at Pete Taylor Park.

== Previous season ==
The 2025 Southern Miss Golden Eagles baseball team finished the season as the Sun Belt tournament and regular season runners-up. They earned an at-large berth into the 2025 NCAA Division I baseball tournament, where they were nationally-seeded at 16 and got to host a regional. In the Hattiesburg Regional, Southern Miss hosted second-seed, Miami (FL); third-seed, Alabama; and fourth-seed, Columbia. The Golden Eagles went 3–2, losing to Miami in the regional final.

Southern Miss second baseman Nick Monistere was named the 2025 Sun Belt Conference Baseball Player of the Year. Outfielder, Carson Paetow, won the 2025 Sun Belt Tony Robichaux Leadership Award. Along with Paetow and Monistere, starting pitcher, JB Middleton and relief pitcher Colby Allen, were named to the All-Sun Belt first team. Starting pitcher, Mitchell Heer; first baseman, Matthew Russo; shortstop, Ozzie Pratt; and outfielder, Jake Cook; were named to the All-Sun Belt second team.

== Preseason ==
=== Sun Belt Conference Coaches Poll ===
The Sun Belt Conference Coaches Poll was released February 4, 2026, and the Golden Eagles were picked to finish second overall in the conference.

Coaches Poll
Predicted finish	Team	Votes (1st place)
1	Coastal Carolina	194 (12)
2	Southern Miss	182 (1)
3	Troy	166
4	Marshall	129
5	Louisiana	126 (1)
6	Texas State	114
7	Georgia Southern	104
7	Old Dominion	104
9	Arkansas State	96
10	App State	78
11	South Alabama	62
12	Georgia State	49
13	James Madison	48
14	ULM	18

=== Preseason All-Sun Belt Team & Honors ===
Preseason All-SBC Team
Player	No.	Position	Class
Ben Higdon	7	OF	RS Senior
Tucker Stockman	36	C	RS Junior

== Offseason ==
=== Acquisitions ===
==== Incoming transfers ====
Incoming transfers
Name	No.	Pos.	Height	Weight	Hometown	Year	Previous school
Kyle Morrison	17	INF	6 ft 0 in (1.83 m)	212 pounds (96 kg)	Wetumpka, AL	Senior	South Alabama
Thomas Crabtree	18	RHP	6 ft 4 in (1.93 m)	200 pounds (91 kg)	Collierville, TN	Junior	Tennessee
Camden Clark	20	RHP	6 ft 1 in (1.85 m)	200 pounds (91 kg)	Laurel, MS	Sophomore	Pearl River CC
Jake Neely	25	RHP	6 ft 4 in (1.93 m)	215 pounds (98 kg)	San Antonio, TX	Sophomore	Arizona State
Jace Norton	25	INF	6 ft 3 in (1.91 m)	196 pounds (89 kg)	Auburn, AL	RS Sophomore	Mississippi State

==== Incoming recruits ====
2025 Southern Miss Recruits
Name	Number	B/T	Pos.	Height	Weight	Hometown	High School
William Tonsmeire	4	R/R	OF	5 ft 9 in (1.75 m)	185 pounds (84 kg)	Vestavia Hills, AL	Vestavia Hills
Gray Eubanks	8	L/R	INF	5 ft 9 in (1.75 m)	200 pounds (91 kg)	Huntingdon, TN	Huntingdon (TN)
Cade Durbin	9	R/R	RHP	6 ft 0 in (1.83 m)	165 pounds (75 kg)	Baton Rouge, LA	Parkview Baptist
Cade Adams	13	S/R	C	5 ft 9 in (1.75 m)	175 pounds (79 kg)	Pearland, TX	Pearland (TX)
Dylan Causey	21	R/R	RHP	6 ft 2 in (1.88 m)	220 pounds (100 kg)	Ellisville, MS	South Jones
Braden Maranto	22	L/R	INF	5 ft 8 in (1.73 m)	165 pounds (75 kg)	Armory, MS	Amory (MS)
Cooper Waddle	23	L/L	LHP	5 ft 9 in (1.75 m)	180 pounds (82 kg)	Fulton, MS	Itawamba Agriculture
Kevin Landry–Farr	28	R/R	RHP	6 ft 3 in (1.91 m)	195 pounds (88 kg)	Proctor, AR	Northpoint Christian
Sam Mitchell	29	R/R	RHP	6 ft 0 in (1.83 m)	200 pounds (91 kg)	Baton Rouge, LA	Parkview Baptist
Andrew Visconti	37	L/L	LHP	6 ft 4 in (1.93 m)	200 pounds (91 kg)	Mason, OH	Mason (OH)
Camden Rodgers	42	R/R	RHP	6 ft 4 in (1.93 m)	228 pounds (103 kg)	Tyrone, GA	Trinity Christian (TX)
Bruce Littleton	43	L/L	LHP	6 ft 2 in (1.88 m)	225 pounds (102 kg)	Vestavia Hills, AL	Vestavia Hills

== Personnel ==
=== Starters ===
Lineup
Pos.	No.	Player.	Year
C	36	Tucker Stockman	RS Junior
1B	19	Matthew Russo	Senior
2B	17	Kyle Morrison	Senior
3B	5	Ty Long	Sophomore
SS	3	Seth Smith	Junior
LF	11	Davis Gillespie	RS Junior
CF	1	Joey Urban	Senior
RF	7	Ben Higdon	RS Junior
DH	15	Drey Barrett	Sophomore

Weekend pitching rotation
Day	No.	Player.	Year
Friday	47	McCarty English	RS Sophomore
Saturday	6	Colby Allen	Senior
Sunday	14	Camden Sunstrom	Sophomore

=== Roster ===
2026 Southern Miss Golden Eagles baseball team
Players
Coaches

#	Pos.	Name	B/T	Height	Weight	Year	Home town
1	OF	Joey Urban	R/R	6 ft 0 in (1.83 m)	198 lb (90 kg)	Sr	Jupiter, FL
2	OF	Caleb Stelly	R/R	6 ft 1 in (1.85 m)	202 lb (92 kg)	Sr	Baton Rouge, LA
3	INF	Seth Smith	L/R	6 ft 2 in (1.88 m)	194 lb (88 kg)	Jr	Mobile, AL
4	OF	William Tonsmeire	R/R	5 ft 9 in (1.75 m)	185 lb (84 kg)	Fr	Vestavia Hills, AL
5	UTL	Ty Long	R/R	6 ft 0 in (1.83 m)	200 lb (91 kg)	So	Ripley, MS
6	RHP	Colby Allen	R/R	6 ft 0 in (1.83 m)	195 lb (88 kg)	Sr	Louisville, MS
7	OF	Ben Higdon	L/R	6 ft 2 in (1.88 m)	220 lb (100 kg)	RS Sr	Paducah, KY
8	INF	Gray Eubanks	L/R	5 ft 9 in (1.75 m)	200 lb (91 kg)	Fr	Huntingdon, TN
9	RHP	Cade Durbin	R/R	6 ft 0 in (1.83 m)	165 lb (75 kg)	Fr	Baton Rouge, LA
10	C	Lawson Odom	R/R	5 ft 10 in (1.78 m)	190 lb (86 kg)	Jr	Laurel, MS
11	OF	Davis Gillespie	R/R	6 ft 1 in (1.85 m)	225 lb (102 kg)	RS Jr	Birmingham, AL
12	LHP	Kros Sivley	L/L	5 ft 11 in (1.8 m)	202 lb (92 kg)	Sr	Sumrall, MS
13	C	Cade Adams	S/R	5 ft 9 in (1.75 m)	175 lb (79 kg)	Fr	Pearland, TX
14	RHP	Camden Sunstrom	R/R	6 ft 2 in (1.88 m)	215 lb (98 kg)	So	Baton Rouge, LA
15	INF	Drey Barrett	R/R	6 ft 3 in (1.91 m)	214 lb (97 kg)	So	Holtville, AL
16	LHP	Grayden Harris	L/L	6 ft 1 in (1.85 m)	210 lb (95 kg)	So	Central, LA
17	INF	Kyle Morrison	L/R	6 ft 0 in (1.83 m)	212 lb (96 kg)	Sr	Wetumpka, AL
18	RHP	Thomas Crabtree	R/R	6 ft 4 in (1.93 m)	200 lb (91 kg)	Jr	Collierville, TN
19	INF	Matthew Russo	L/R	6 ft 2 in (1.88 m)	255 lb (116 kg)	Sr	Madisonville, LA
20	RHP	Camden Clark	R/R	6 ft 1 in (1.85 m)	200 lb (91 kg)	So	Laure, MS
21	RHP	Dylan Causey	R/R	6 ft 2 in (1.88 m)	220 lb (100 kg)	Fr	Ellisville, MS
22	INF	Braden Maranto	L/R	5 ft 8 in (1.73 m)	165 lb (75 kg)	Fr	Amory, MS
23	LHP	Cooper Waddle	L/L	5 ft 9 in (1.75 m)	180 lb (82 kg)	Fr	Fulton, MS
24	LHP	Jackson Parker	L/L	6 ft 0 in (1.83 m)	215 lb (98 kg)	RS So	Stringer, MS
25	RHP	Jake Neely	R/R	6 ft 4 in (1.93 m)	215 lb (98 kg)	So	San Antonio, TX
26	INF	Jace Norton	R/R	6 ft 3 in (1.91 m)	196 lb (89 kg)	RS So	Auburn, AL
27	RHP	Micah Wascom	R/R	6 ft 0 in (1.83 m)	202 lb (92 kg)	So	Bogalusa, LA
28	RHP	Kevin Landry–Farr	R/R	6 ft 3 in (1.91 m)	195 lb (88 kg)	Fr	Proctor, AR
29	RHP	Sam Mitchell	R/R	6 ft 0 in (1.83 m)	200 lb (91 kg)	Fr	Baton Rouge, LA
30	RHP	Cole Richardson	R/R	6 ft 5 in (1.96 m)	190 lb (86 kg)	So	Ellisville, MS
32	RHP	Josh Och	R/R	5 ft 11 in (1.8 m)	192 lb (87 kg)	Jr	Victoria, MN
35	RHP	Logan Pratt	R/R	6 ft 5 in (1.96 m)	225 lb (102 kg)	RS Fr	Granada, MS
36	C	Tucker Stockman	R/R	6 ft 4 in (1.93 m)	230 lb (104 kg)	RS Jr	Athens, AL
37	LHP	Andrew Visconti	L/L	6 ft 4 in (1.93 m)	200 lb (91 kg)	Fr	Mason, OH
38	RHP	Drake Meeks	R/R	6 ft 4 in (1.93 m)	215 lb (98 kg)	RS So	Birmingham, AL
39	RHP	JW Armistead	R/R	6 ft 5 in (1.96 m)	215 lb (98 kg)	Sr	Mooreville, MS
41	RHP	Teague Broadhead	R/R	6 ft 2 in (1.88 m)	200 lb (91 kg)	RS Fr	Fairhope, AL
42	RHP	Camden Rodgers	R/R	6 ft 4 in (1.93 m)	228 lb (103 kg)	Fr	Tyrone, GA
43	LHP	Bruce Littleton	L/L	6 ft 2 in (1.88 m)	225 lb (102 kg)	Fr	Vestavia Hills, AL
45	LHP	Brooks Willoughby	L/L	6 ft 5 in (1.96 m)	220 lb (100 kg)	So	Vicksburg, MS
47	RHP	McCarty English	R/R	6 ft 1 in (1.85 m)	180 lb (82 kg)	RS So	Ocean Springs, MS
48	LHP	Chase Adams	L/L	6 ft 2 in (1.88 m)	225 lb (102 kg)	RS Jr	Normal, IL

Head coach

Christian Ostrander

Assistant coach(es)

Travis Creel
Ladd Rhodes
Ben Brewer
Gunner Leger

Legend

- (C) Team captain
- (S) Suspended
- (I) Ineligible
- Injured
- Current redshirt

Roster
Last update: May 10, 2026

=== Coaching and support staff ===
2026 Southern Miss Golden Eagles baseball coaching staff
Name	Position	Seasons at USM	Alma mater
Christian Ostrander	Head coach	3	Delta State University (1996)
Travis Creel	Assistant coach	7	University of Southern Mississippi (2013)
Ladd Rhodes	Assistant coach	6	Southeastern Louisiana University (2013)
Ben Brewer	Assistant coach	2	University of Tennessee at Martin (2013)
Gunner Leger	Assistant coach	1	University of Louisiana at Lafayette (2019)

2026 Southern Miss Golden Eagles baseball support staff
Name	Position	Seasons at USM	Alma mater
Sven Pearson	Athletic trainer	7	Louisiana Tech University (2018)
Todd Makovicka	Strength and conditioning coach	8	University of Southern Mississippi (2016)
Carly Makovicka	Director of operations	2	Mississippi State University (2018)

== Game log ==
2026 Southern Miss Golden Eagles baseball game log (44–17)
Regular season: 40–14 (Home: 23–5; Away: 13–8; Neutral: 4–1)

February: 9–1 (Home: 3–1; Away: 3–0; Neutral: 3–0)
Date	TV	Opponent	Rank	Stadium	Score	Win	Loss	Save	Attendance	Overall	SBC
February 13	ESPN+	No. 21 UCSB*	No. 20	Pete Taylor Park; Hattiesburg, MS	L 1–5	Flora (1–0)	Allen (0–1)	Hoover (1)	5,498	0–1	—
February 14	ESPN+	No. 21 UCSB*	No. 20	Pete Taylor Park	W 8–6	Och (1–0)	Krodel (0–1)	Clark (1)	5,561	1–1	—
February 15	ESPN+	No. 21 UCSB*	No. 20	Pete Taylor Park	W 6–5	Clark (1–0)	Jannicelli (0–1)	—	5,459	2–1	—
February 17	ESPN+	at SE Louisiana*	No. 20	Pat Kenelly Diamond; Hammond, LA	W 3–1	Och (2–0)	Gisclair (0–1)	Clark (2)	1,544	3–1	—
2026 Round Rock Classic
February 20	D1B+	vs. Purdue*	No. 20	Dell Diamond; Round Rock, TX	W 5–4	Clark (2–0)	Kramer (0–2)	—	3,572	4–1	—
February 21	D1B+	vs. No. 11 Oregon State*	No. 20	Dell Diamond	W 9–4	Harris (1–0)	Kleinschmit (0–1)	Sunstrom (1)	4,391	5–1	—
February 22	D1B+	vs. Baylor*	No. 20	Dell Diamond	W 5–1	Sivley (1–0)	Hansen (0–1)	Armistead (1)	3,245	6–1	—
February 25	ESPN+	No. 25 Alabama*	No. 12	Pete Taylor Park	W 14–4^{8}	Littleton (1–0)	Blackwood (0–1)	—	5,538	7–1	—
February 27	ESPN+	at Louisiana Tech*	No. 12	J. C. Love Field; Ruston, LA	W 8–3	Sivley (2–0)	Dahl (2–1)	Och (1)	2,888	8–1	—
February 28	ESPN+	at Louisiana Tech*	No. 12	J. C. Love Field	W 11–0^{7}	Harris (2–0)	Rowan (2–1)	—	2,818	9–1	—

March: 12–7 (Home: 10–4; Away: 1–3; Neutral: 1–0)
Date	TV	Opponent	Rank	Stadium	Score	Win	Loss	Save	Attendance	Overall	SBC
March 1	ESPN+	at Louisiana Tech*	No. 12	J. C. Love Field	W 6–2	Sunstrom (1–0)	Roberson (2–1)	Clark (3)	2,263	10–1	—
March 3	ESPN+	No. 4 Mississippi State*	No. 11	Pete Taylor Park	W 7–6	Och (3–0)	Miller (1–1)	Clark (4)	5,716	11–1	—
March 4	ESPN+	Nicholls*	No. 11	Pete Taylor Park	L 2–3	Avery (1–0)	Crabtree (0–1)	Poirrier (1)	5,370	11–2	—
March 6	ESPN+	North Alabama*	No. 11	Pete Taylor Park	W 9–4	Allen (1–1)	Patterson (0–2)	Sivley (1)	5,364	12–2	—
March 7	ESPN+	North Alabama*	No. 11	Pete Taylor Park	W 6–1	Harris (3–0)	Davenport (2–2)	Och (2)	5,263	13–2	—
March 8	ESPN+	North Alabama*	No. 11	Pete Taylor Park	W 9–2	English (1–0)	Stogner (1–1)	—	5,152	14–2	—
March 10	ESPN+	Ole Miss*	No. 7	Pete Taylor Park	W 2–1	Clark (3–0)	Robertson (2–1)	—	5,775	15–2	—
March 13	ESPN+	at Arkansas State	No. 7	Tomlinson Stadium; Jonesboro, AR	L 5–8	Weimer (3–0)	Sunstrom (1–1)	—	1,748	15–3	0–1
March 14	ESPN+	at Arkansas State	No. 7	Tomlinson Stadium	W 7–1	Harris (4–0)	Nelson (1–2)	—	1,972	16–3	1–1
March 15	ESPN+	at Arkansas State	No. 7	Tomlinson Stadium	L 2–5	Farley (3–0)	English (1–1)	Garrison (3)	1,051	16–4	1–2
March 17	ESPN+	vs. Nicholls*	No. 12	Keesler Federal Park; Biloxi, MS	W 4–0	Sunstrom (2–1)	Richard (2–1)	—	3,023	17–4	—
March 20	ESPN+	Troy	No. 12	Pete Taylor Park	L 5–6	Stubbs (2–0)	Harris (4–1)	Ellingworth (1)	5,341	17–5	1–3
March 21	ESPN+	Troy	No. 12	Pete Taylor Park	W 11–5	Sivley (3–0)	Alonso (3–1)	—	5,457	18–5	2–3
March 22	ESPN+	Troy	No. 12	Pete Taylor Park	W 5–4	Clark (4–0)	Ellingworth (0–2)	—	5,187	19–5	3–3
March 24	SECN+	at No. 4 Mississippi State*	No. 11	Dudy Noble Field; Starkville, MS	L 0–12^{7}	Bauer (1–0)	Crabtree (0–2)	—	12,887	19–6	—
March 27	ESPN+	Appalachian State	No. 11	Pete Taylor Park	W 6–5	Allen (2–1)	Wilson (1–1)	Clark (5)	5,359	20–6	4–3
March 28	ESPN+	Appalachian State	No. 11	Pete Taylor Park	L 2–6	Beaty (1–0)	Sivley (3–1)	—	5,303	20–7	4–4
March 29	ESPN+	Appalachian State	No. 11	Pete Taylor Park	W 13–4	Armistead (1–0)	Barozzino (0–2)	—	5,231	21–7	5–4
March 31	ESPN+	SE Louisiana*	No. 8	Pete Taylor Park	L 1–5	Lirette (2–1)	Sivley (3–2)	—	5,190	21–8	—

April: 10–6 (Home: 5–0; Away: 5–5; Neutral: 0–1)
Date	TV	Opponent	Rank	Stadium	Score	Win	Loss	Save	Attendance	Overall	SBC
April 2	ESPN+	at Old Dominion	No. 8	Bud Metheny Ballpark; Norfolk, VA	W 10–4	Harris (5–1)	Kuskie (2–5)	—	180	22–8	6–4
April 3	ESPN+	at Old Dominion	No. 8	Bud Metheny Ballpark	L 8–10	Tanton (3–0)	Sunstrom (2–2)	—	214	22–9	6–5
April 4	ESPN+	at Old Dominion	No. 8	Bud Metheny Ballpark	W 8–7	Clark (5–0)	Davis (0–1)	—	285	23–9	7–5
April 7	ESPN+	New Orleans*	No. 10	Pete Taylor Park	W 3–2	Allen (3–1)	Alack (0–3)	—	5,310	24–9	—
April 10	ESPN+	at Louisiana	No. 10	M. L. Tigue Moore Field; Lafayette, LA	W 8–1	Harris (6–1)	Pruitt (2–3)	—	4,218	25–9	8–5
April 11	ESPN+	at Louisiana	No. 10	M. L. Tigue Moore Field	L 4–8	Herrmann (4–2)	Sunstrom (2–3)	—	4,121	25–10	8–6
April 12	ESPN+	at Louisiana	No. 10	M. L. Tigue Moore Field	L 5–6	Smith (2–3)	Och (3–1)	Brasch (5)	3,975	25–11	8–7
April 14		vs. No. 25 Ole Miss*	No. 22	Trustmark Park; Pearl, MS	L 3–10	Koenig (2–0)	Littleton (1–1)	—	7,285	25–12	—
April 17	ESPN+	Texas State	No. 22	Pete Taylor Park	W 8–2	Harris (7–1)	Cooper (4–1)	—	5,430	26–12	9–7
April 18	ESPN+	Texas State	No. 22	Pete Taylor Park	W 6–3	Sunstrom (3–3)	Smith (3–1)	Sivley (2)	5,492	27–12	10–7
April 19	ESPN+	Texas State	No. 22	Pete Taylor Park	W 5–4^{10}	Crabtree (1–2)	Gutierrez (2–1)	—	5,380	28–12	11–7
April 21	ESPN+	Tulane*	No. 18	Pete Taylor Park	W 5–4	Allen (4–1)	Vincent (1–2)	—	5,332	29–12	—
April 24	ESPN+	at South Alabama	No. 18	Eddie Stanky Field; Mobile, AL	W 4–3	Och (4–1)	Shineflew (4–2)	Allen (1)	2,713	30–12	12–7
April 25	ESPN+	at South Alabama	No. 18	Eddie Stanky Field	W 16–7	Sivley (4–2)	Bozenhard (2–2)	—	1,808	31–12	13–7
April 26	ESPN+	at South Alabama	No. 18	Eddie Stanky Field	L 3–4	Stevens (5–1)	Och (4–2)	—	2,474	31–13	13–8
April 28	ESPN+	at Tulane*	No. 12	Turchin Stadium; New Orleans, LA	L 6–7	Larson (2–2)	Broadhead (0–1)	—	2,247	31–14	—

May: 9–0 (Home: 6–0; Away: 3–0; Neutral: 0–0)
Date	TV	Opponent	Rank	Stadium	Score	Win	Loss	Save	Attendance	Overall	SBC
May 2 (Note: Part of a doubleheader.)	ESPN+	ULM	No. 12	Pete Taylor Park	W 2–1^{11}	Allen (5–1)	Roark (2–2)	—	5,376	32–14	14–8
May 2	ESPN+	ULM	No. 12	Pete Taylor Park	W 3–1	Clark (6–0)	Corley (2–2)	Och (3)	5,376	33–14	15–8
May 3	ESPN+	ULM	No. 12	Pete Taylor Park	W 7–3	Sunstrom (4–3)	Sheets (3–2)	—	5,434	34–14	16–8
May 8	ESPN+	at James Madison	No. 12	Veterans Memorial Park; Harrisonburg, VA	W 8–5	Och (5–2)	Kinsler (4–2)	Allen (2)	1,008	35–14	17–8
May 9	ESPN+	at James Madison	No. 12	Veterans Memorial Park	W 11–1^{8}	Clark (7–0)	McKinney (2–4)	—	631	36–14	18–8
May 10	ESPN+	at James Madison	No. 12	Veterans Memorial Park	W 10–5	Sunstrom (5–3)	Lutz (3–5)	—	440	37–14	19–8
May 14	ESPN+	Georgia Southern	No. 8	Pete Taylor Park	W 14–3^{7}	Harris (8–1)	Holder (2–6)	—	5,418	38–14	20–8
May 15	ESPN+	Georgia Southern	No. 8	Pete Taylor Park	W 10–1	Clark (8–0)	Garrett (0–8)	Sivley (3)	5,421	39–14	21–8
May 16	ESPN+	Georgia Southern	No. 8	Pete Taylor Park	W 11–0^{8}	Sunstrom (6–3)	Mason (3–5)	—	5,432	40–14	22–8

Postseason: 4–3 (Home: 0–2; Away: 0–0; Neutral: 4–1)

SBC tournament: (4–1)
Date	TV	Opponent	Rank	Stadium	Score	Win	Loss	Save	Attendance	Overall	SBCT Record	Source
May 20	ESPN+	vs. (9) Georgia State	(1); No. 8	Dabos Park; Montgomery, AL	W 7–6	Allen (6–1)	Crooms (3–5)	—	320	41–14	1–0	
May 22	ESPN+	vs. (4) Troy	(1); No. 8	Dabos Park	W 7–6	Och (6–2)	Ellingworth (1–4)	—	650	42–14	2–0	
May 23	ESPN+	vs. (4) Troy	(1); No. 8	Dabos Park	L 6–9	Crotchfelt (5–2)	Sunstrom (6–4)	Egan (1)	692	42–15	2–1	
May 24	ESPN+	vs. (4) Troy	(1); No. 8	Dabos Park	W 6–2	Allen (7–1)	Nelson (3–2)	—	732	43–15	3–1	
May 24	ESPN+	vs. (7) Louisiana	(1); No. 8	Dabos Park	W 11–7	Crabtree (2–2)	Herrmann (7–5)	—	1,093	44–15	4–1	

Hattiesburg Regional: (0–2)
Date	TV	Opponent	Rank	Stadium	Score	Win	Loss	Save	Attendance	Overall	NCAAT Record
May 29	ESPN+	(4) Little Rock	(1); No. 7	Pete Taylor Park	L 4–7	Andrews (5–2)	Allen (7–2)	—	5,331	44–16	0–1
May 30	ESPN+	(2) Virginia	(1); No. 7	Pete Taylor Park	L 11–15^{10}	Stammel (4–5)	Crabtree (2–3)	—	5,331	44–17	0–2

Legend: = Win = Loss = Canceled
Bold =Southern Miss team member
Rankings are based on the team's current ranking in the D1Baseball poll.

Schedule Notes

== Rankings ==
Ranking movements Legend: ██ Increase in ranking ██ Decrease in ranking — = Not ranked
	Week																	
Poll	Pre	1	2	3	4	5	6	7	8	9	10	11	12	13	14	15	16	Final
Coaches'	20	20*	12	11	7	15	13	13	13	20	19	13	13	9	10	7	7*	17
Baseball America	23	21	18	12	10	16	16	16	12	20	16	13	12	8	8	8*	8*	17
NCBWA†	20	22	14	11	7	11	13	10	11	17	16	12	12	8	8	8*	24	23
D1Baseball	20	20	12	10	7	12	11	8	10	22	18	12	12	8	8	7	7*	24
Perfect Game	23	18	10	8	6	12	12	13	15	—	22	15	13	10	10	10*	10*	20

† NCBWA ranks 30 teams in their preseason poll, but only ranks 25 teams weekly during the season.
* A new poll was not released for this week, so for comparison purposes, the previous week's ranking is inserted in this week's slot.
