= Bobcat Ballpark =

Baseball venue in San Marcos, Texas, US

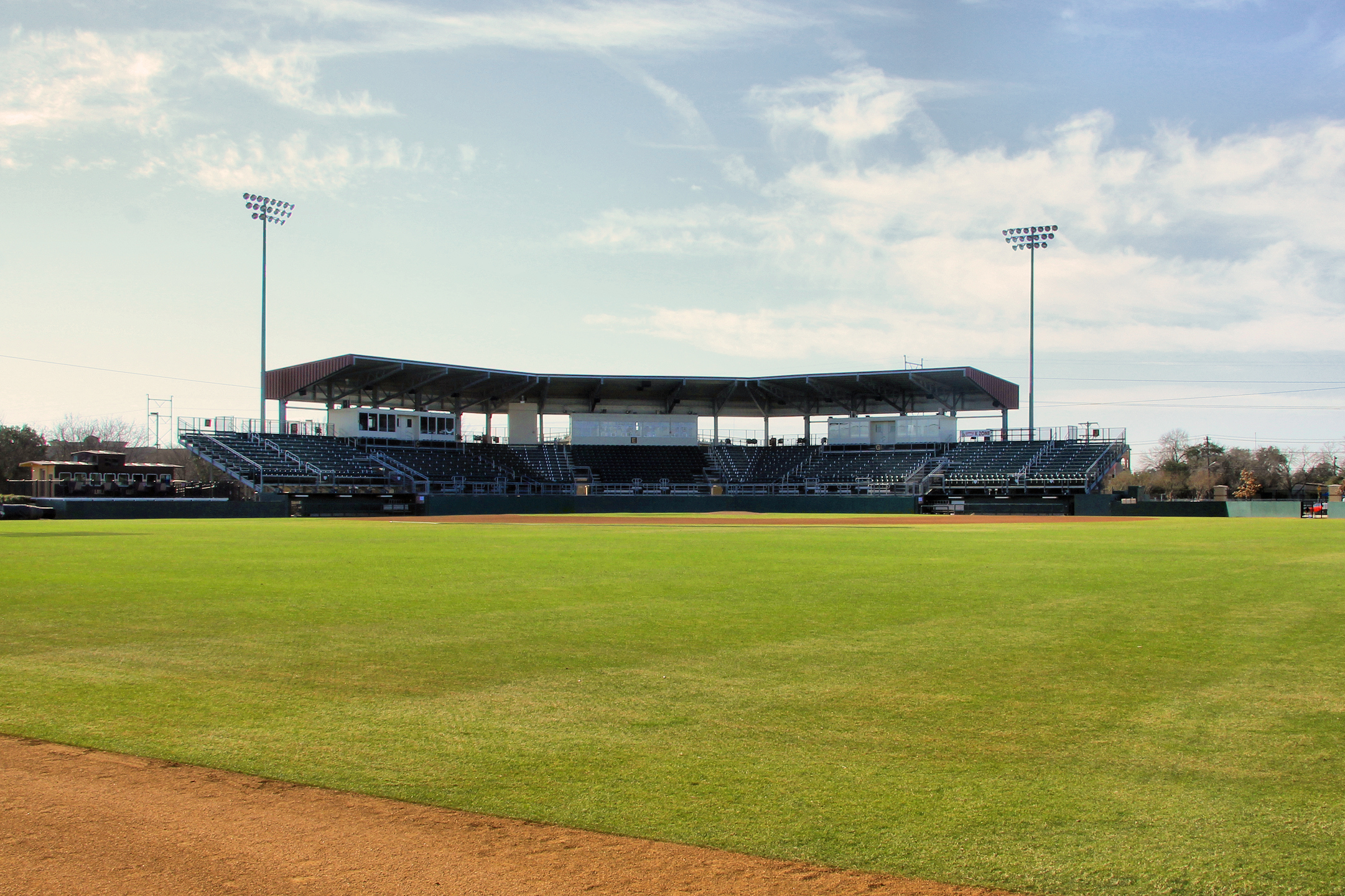
- Interactive map of Bobcat Ballpark
- Coordinates: 29°53′16″N 97°55′42″W
- Owner: Texas State University System
- Operator: Texas State University
- Capacity: 2,500
- Surface: Artificial Turf
- Field size: Left Field: 330 ft (101 m); Center Field: 404 ft (123 m); Right Field: 330 ft (101 m)

Construction
- Opened: 2009

Tenants
- Texas State Bobcats baseball (NCAA) (1985–present); Southland tournament (2011, 2012); Sun Belt tournament (2015)

Bobcat Ballpark is a baseball venue in San Marcos, Texas, on the campus of Texas State University. It is home of the Texas State Bobcats baseball team of the NCAA Division I Sun Belt Conference. It currently holds 2,500 spectators. In 2008, the baseball and softball stadiums were renovated and expanded to its current design. In addition, four luxury suites for up to 12 people were added. The renovations made their debut on March 5, 2009, against the Texas Longhorns with a record setting 2,593 people.

Features of the venue include a press box, team merchandise area, batting cages, stadium lighting, and a chain link/mesh backstop.

In 2013, the Bobcats ranked 47th among Division I baseball programs in attendance, averaging 1,368 per home game.

In addition to Bobcat baseball, the stadium hosts other baseball events, such as high school baseball tournaments. From May 23–26, 2012, it hosted the 2012 Southland Conference baseball tournament, won by UT Arlington.

== See also ==
- List of NCAA Division I baseball venues
