= 2025 Coastal Carolina Chanticleers baseball team =

American college baseball season

2025 Coastal Carolina Chanticleers baseball

Sun Belt regular season & tournament champions Conway Regional champions Auburn Super Regional champions

College World Series, Runner-up
- Conference: Sun Belt Conference

Ranking
- Coaches: No. 2
- D1Baseball.com: No. 2
- Record: 56–13 (26–4 SBC)
- Head coach: Kevin Schnall (1st season)
- Associate head coach: Chad Oxendine (1st season)
- Assistant coaches: Matt Williams (1st season); Matt Schilling (18th season)
- Home stadium: Springs Brooks Stadium

2025 Sun Belt Conference baseball standings
| | Conf. | | | | Overall |
| Team | W | | L | PCT | W | | L | PCT |
|---|---|---|---|---|---|---|---|---|
| No. 11 Coastal Carolina ‍†‍‡‍^{y} | 26 | – | 4 | .867 | 51 | – | 11 | .823 |
| No. 12 Southern Miss ‍‍‍^{y} | 24 | – | 6 | .800 | 47 | – | 16 | .746 |
| Troy ‍‍‍ | 18 | – | 12 | .600 | 39 | – | 21 | .650 |
| Marshall ‍‍‍ | 16 | – | 14 | .533 | 33 | – | 26 | .559 |
| Louisiana ‍‍‍ | 16 | – | 14 | .533 | 27 | – | 31 | .466 |
| Old Dominion ‍‍‍ | 15 | – | 15 | .500 | 22 | – | 31 | .415 |
| Arkansas State ‍‍‍ | 14 | – | 16 | .467 | 26 | – | 28 | .481 |
| Texas State ‍‍‍ | 14 | – | 16 | .467 | 27 | – | 31 | .466 |
| Georgia Southern ‍‍‍ | 13 | – | 17 | .433 | 28 | – | 31 | .475 |
| Appalachian State ‍‍‍ | 13 | – | 17 | .433 | 23 | – | 31 | .426 |
| South Alabama ‍‍‍ | 12 | – | 18 | .400 | 23 | – | 28 | .451 |
| Georgia State ‍‍‍ | 11 | – | 19 | .367 | 26 | – | 30 | .464 |
| James Madison ‍‍‍ | 10 | – | 20 | .333 | 17 | – | 38 | .309 |
| Louisiana–Monroe ‍‍‍ | 8 | – | 22 | .267 | 22 | – | 33 | .400 |
† – Conference champion ‡ – Tournament champion y – Invited to the NCAA Tournament; As of June 1, 2025; Rankings from D1Baseball

The 2025 Coastal Carolina Chanticleers baseball team represented Coastal Carolina University during the 2025 NCAA Division I baseball season. The Chanticleers played their home games at Springs Brooks Stadium and were led by first year head coach Kevin Schnall. They are members of the Sun Belt Conference.

== Preseason ==
=== Sun Belt Conference Coaches Poll ===
The Sun Belt Conference Coaches Poll was released February 6, 2025, and the Chanticleers were picked to finish fourth overall in the conference.

Coaches Poll
| Predicted finish | Team | Votes (1st place) |
| 1 | Southern Miss | 179 (5) |
| 2 | Troy | 178 (4) |
| 3 | Louisiana | 174 (3) |
| 4 | Coastal Carolina | 161 (2) |
| 5 | Georgia Southern | 125 |
| 6 | James Madison | 106 |
| 7 | Old Dominion | 105 |
| 8 | Texas State | 102 |
| 9 | App State | 94 |
| 10 | South Alabama | 93 |
| 11 | Georgia State | 49 |
| 12 | Marshall | 46 |
| 13 | ULM | 34 |
| 14 | Arkansas State | 24 |

=== Sun Belt Conference Preseason Player of the Year ===
Caden Bodine, Coastal Carolina (Jr., C – Haddon Heights, N.J.)

=== Preseason All-Sun Belt Team & Honors ===
- Chase Morgan, Louisiana (So., SP – Cypress, Texas)
- Bryce Blevins, Marshall (Jr., SP – Louisa, Ky.)
- Colby Allen, Southern Miss (Jr., SP – Louisville, Miss.)
- Max Kuhle, James Madison (Jr., RP – Virginia Beach, Va.)
- Caden Bodine, Coastal Carolina (Jr., C – Haddon Heights, N.J.)
- Matthew Russo, Southern Miss (Jr., 1B – Madisonville, La.)
- Blake Barthol, Coastal Carolina (Jr., 2B – Allentown, Pa.)
- Ozzie Pratt, Southern Miss (Sr., SS – Alesville, Miss.)
- Lee Amedee, Louisiana (Jr., 3B – Gonzales, La.)
- Josh Tate, Georgia Southern (Jr., OF – Peachtree City, Ga.)
- Luke Waters, Old Dominion (Sr., OF – Laurel, Del.)
- Davis Gillespie, Southern Miss (RS So., OF – Birmingham, Ala.)
- Ryan Dooley, James Madison (Sr., DH – Reston, Va.)
- Nick Monistere, Southern Miss (Jr., UT – Brandon, Miss.)

== Personnel ==
2025 Coastal Carolina Chanticleers baseball team
Players
Coaches

| # | Pos. | Name | B/T | Height | Weight | Year | Home town |
|---|---|---|---|---|---|---|---|
| 1 | OF | Sebastian Alexander (redshirt) | R/R | 6 ft 1 in (1.85 m) | 190 lb (86 kg) | Sr | Mayfield, Ohio |
| 2 | RHP | Cameron Flukey | R/R | 6 ft 6 in (1.98 m) | 210 lb (95 kg) | So | Egg Harbor Township, New Jersey |
| 3 | INF | Ty Dooley | L/R | 5 ft 10 in (1.78 m) | 185 lb (84 kg) | Sr | Elgin, South Carolina |
| 5 | INF | Walker Mitchell | L/R | 5 ft 11 in (1.8 m) | 180 lb (82 kg) | So | Lexington, South Carolina |
| 6 | OF | Chad Born (redshirt) | R/R | 6 ft 1 in (1.85 m) | 195 lb (88 kg) | Sr | Placentia, California |
| 7 | INF | Blake Barthol | L/R | 5 ft 9 in (1.75 m) | 185 lb (84 kg) | Jr | Allentown, Pennsylvania |
| 8 | INF | Dean Mihos | R/R | 5 ft 9 in (1.75 m) | 165 lb (75 kg) | Jr | Chester Springs, Pennsylvania |
| 10 | INF | Ty Barrango (redshirt) | R/R | 5 ft 11 in (1.8 m) | 160 lb (73 kg) | Jr | San Mateo, California |
| 12 | INF | Jake Books | L/L | 6 ft 0 in (1.83 m) | 200 lb (91 kg) | Jr | Royersford, Pennsylvania |
| 13 | C | Domenico Tozzi | R/R | 5 ft 10 in (1.78 m) | 195 lb (88 kg) | Fr | Camp Hill, Pennsylvania |
| 16 | OF | Colby Thorndyke (redshirt) | L/R | 6 ft 0 in (1.83 m) | 215 lb (98 kg) | So | Lumberton, North Carolina |
| 17 | C | Caden Bodine | S/R | 5 ft 10 in (1.78 m) | 200 lb (91 kg) | Jr | Haddon Heights, New Jersey |
| 18 | LHP | Hayden Johnson | L/L | 6 ft 5 in (1.96 m) | 215 lb (98 kg) | So | Myrtle Beach, South Carolina |
| 20 | OF | Wells Sykes | R/R | 5 ft 8 in (1.73 m) | 185 lb (84 kg) | Sr | Gilbert, South Carolina |
| 21 | RHP | Jaxon Appelman | R/R | 6 ft 1 in (1.85 m) | 205 lb (93 kg) | Fr | Edison, New Jersey |
| 22 | OF | Blagen Pado | R/R | 5 ft 10 in (1.78 m) | 185 lb (84 kg) | So | Haymarket, Virginia |
| 23 | RHP | Clavin Junek | R/R | 6 ft 4 in (1.93 m) | 210 lb (95 kg) | Fr | Sebastian, Florida |
| 24 | C | Brice Estep | R/R | 5 ft 9 in (1.75 m) | 190 lb (86 kg) | So | Fort Mitchell, Kentucky |
| 25 | RHP | Cullen McKay | R/R | 6 ft 1 in (1.85 m) | 210 lb (95 kg) | Jr | Norfolk, Virginia |
| 26 | RHP | Riley Eikhoff (redshirt) | R/R | 5 ft 10 in (1.78 m) | 185 lb (84 kg) | Sr | Bristow, Virginia |
| 27 | INF | Freddy Rodriguez | R/R | 5 ft 10 in (1.78 m) | 160 lb (73 kg) | Jr | Wellington, Florida |
| 29 | RHP | Matthew Potok (redshirt) | R/R | 6 ft 4 in (1.93 m) | 220 lb (100 kg) | Jr | Jackson, New Jersey |
| 30 | RHP | Andrew Bowers | R/R | 6 ft 2 in (1.88 m) | 215 lb (98 kg) | So | Mount Pleasant, South Carolina |
| 31 | RHP | Scott Doran | R/R | 6 ft 4 in (1.93 m) | 220 lb (100 kg) | Fr | Erdenheim, Pennsylvania |
| 32 | OF | Ryan Perez | L/R | 5 ft 9 in (1.75 m) | 190 lb (86 kg) | So | Greenwich, Connecticut |
| 33 | LHP | Tadan Bell (redshirt) | L/L | 6 ft 2 in (1.88 m) | 197 lb (89 kg) | So | Columbus, Nebraska |
| 34 | LHP | Dawson Newman | L/L | 6 ft 1 in (1.85 m) | 180 lb (82 kg) | Fr | Chesapeake, Virginia |
| 35 | RHP | Chance Mako | R/R | 6 ft 5 in (1.96 m) | 190 lb (86 kg) | So | Salisbury, North Carolina |
| 36 | RHP | Dylan Hansen | R/R | 6 ft 2 in (1.88 m) | 200 lb (91 kg) | Fr | Exton, Pennsylvania |
| 37 | OF | Kylen Watson | L/R | 6 ft 0 in (1.83 m) | 195 lb (88 kg) | Fr | Lititz, Pennsylvania |
| 38 | RHP | Elias Holbert (redshirt) | R/R | 6 ft 4 in (1.93 m) | 244 lb (111 kg) | Jr | Sherwood, Oregon |
| 39 | RHP | Darin Horn (redshirt) | R/R | 6 ft 4 in (1.93 m) | 200 lb (91 kg) | Jr | Bluffton, South Carolina |
| 40 | LHP | Dominick Carbone | L/L | 5 ft 10 in (1.78 m) | 180 lb (82 kg) | So | Rocky Point, New York |
| 41 | RHP | Oliver Ellison | R/R | 6 ft 1 in (1.85 m) | 199 lb (90 kg) | So | Knoxville, Maryland |
| 43 | RHP | Matt Joyce (redshirt) | R/R | 5 ft 11 in (1.8 m) | 185 lb (84 kg) | Sr | Braintree, Massachusetts |
| 44 | OF | Kaleb Huffman | L/L | 5 ft 11 in (1.8 m) | 210 lb (95 kg) | Jr | Locust Grove, Georgia |
| 45 | RHP | Luke Jones | R/R | 5 ft 10 in (1.78 m) | 185 lb (84 kg) | Fr | Greenville, South Carolina |
| 47 | RHP | Hudson Lance | R/R | 5 ft 9 in (1.75 m) | 185 lb (84 kg) | Fr | Trinity, North Carolina |
| 49 | RHP | Ryan Lynch | R/R | 6 ft 4 in (1.93 m) | 234 lb (106 kg) | Sr | Snohomish, Washington |
| 51 | RHP | Jacob Morrison (redshirt) | R/R | 6 ft 8 in (2.03 m) | 245 lb (111 kg) | So | Flushing, Michigan |

Head coach

Kevin Schnall (Coastal Carolina)

Assistant coach(es)

Chad Oxendine (Coastal Carolina)
Matt Williams (Spartanburg Methodist College)
Matt Schilling (Coastal Carolina)

Legend

- (C) Team captain
- (S) Suspended
- (I) Ineligible
- Injured
- Current redshirt

Roster
Last update: 16 February 2025

== Schedule and results ==
Legend
| | Coastal Carolina win |
| | Coastal Carolina loss |
| | Postponement/Cancelation/Suspensions |
| **Bold** | Coastal Carolina team member |
| * | Non-Conference game |

2025 Coastal Carolina Chanticleers baseball game log (51–13)
Regular season (44–11)

February (8–2)
| Date | Opponent | Rank | Site/stadium | Score | Win | Loss | Save | TV | Attendance | Overall record | SBC record |
Baseball at the Beach
| Feb. 14 | Saint Joseph's* | | Springs Brooks Stadium • Conway, SC | **W** 11–1^{7} | **Johnson** (1–0) | Ciccone | | ESPN+ | 2,816 | 1–0 | |
| Feb. 15 | Kansas State* | | Springs Brooks Stadium • Conway, SC | **W** 8–3 | **Carbone** (1–0) | Slack | | ESPN+ | 2,848 | 2–0 | |
| Feb. 16 | Washington* | | Springs Brooks Stadium • Conway, SC | **W** 11–1^{7} | **Eikhoff** (1–0) | Brandenburg | | ESPN+ | 2,082 | 3–0 | |
| Feb. 17 | Kansas State* | | Springs Brooks Stadium • Conway, SC | **W** 9–2 | **Morrison** (1–0) | Sheffield | | ESPN+ | 2,203 | 4–0 | |
| Feb. 18 | Charleston* | | Springs Brooks Stadium • Conway, SC | **L** 5–15^{8} | Lyon | **Ellison** (0–1) | | ESPN+ | 2,076 | 4–1 | |
Jax College Baseball Classic
| Feb. 21 | vs. Alabama* | | 121 Financial Ballpark • Jacksonville, FL | **L** 2–9 | Fay | **McKay** (0–1) | | D1Baseball.com | 2,020 | 4–2 | |
| Feb. 22 | vs. Ohio State* | | 121 Financial Ballpark • Jacksonville, FL | **W** 10–8; 11 Inn | **Lynch** (1–0) | Blosser | **Doran** (1) | D1Baseball.com | | 5–2 | |
| Feb. 23 | vs. No. 12 NC State* | | 121 Financial Ballpark • Jacksonville, FL | **W** 10–3 | **Eikhoff** (2–0) | Marohn | **Johnson** (1) | D1Baseball.com | 4,856 | 6–2 | |
| Feb. 25 | UNC Wilmington* | | Springs Brooks Stadium • Conway, SC | **W** 6–1 | **Potok** (1–0) | Phelan | | ESPN+ | 2,653 | 7–2 | |
| Feb. 28 | Rutgers* | | Springs Brooks Stadium • Conway, SC | **W** 10–0; 7 Inn. | **McKay** (1–1) | Shadek | | ESPN+ | 3,001 | 8–2 | |

March (12–6)
| Date | Opponent | Rank | Site/stadium | Score | Win | Loss | Save | TV | Attendance | Overall record | SBC record |
|---|---|---|---|---|---|---|---|---|---|---|---|
| Mar. 1 | Rutgers* | | Springs Brooks Stadium • Conway, SC | **W** 6–5 | **Johnson** (2–0) | Gleason | | ESPN+ | 3,171 | 9–2 | |
| Mar. 2 | Rutgers* | | Springs Brooks Stadium • Conway, SC | **W** 6–1 | **Eikhoff** (3–0) | Prince | | ESPN+ | 1,890 | 10–2 | |
| Mar. 4 | at No. 4 North Carolina* | No. 24 | Boshamer Stadium • Chapel Hill, NC | **L** 4–5; 11 inn | Padgett | **Potok** (1–1) | | ACCNX | 2,550 | 10–3 | |
| Mar. 7 | at East Carolina* | No. 24 | Clark–LeClair Stadium • Greenville, NC | **L** 0–7 | Norby | **Jones** (0–1) | | ESPN+ | 4,258 | 10–4 | |
| Mar. 8 | at East Carolina | No. 24 | Clark–LeClair Stadium • Greenville, NC | **W** 9–1 | **Flukey** (1–0) | Jenkins | | ESPN+ | 5,117 | 11–4 | |
| Mar. 9 | at East Carolina* | No. 24 | Clark–LeClair Stadium • Greenville, NC | **W** 4–3; 11 inn | **Morrison** (2–0) | Hunter | **Carbone** (1) | ESPN+ | 4,112 | 12–4 | |
| Mar. 11 | No. 14 Wake Forest* | No. 24 | Springs Brooks Stadium • Conway, SC | **L** 6–16; 7 inn | Bedford | **Horn** (1–0) | None | ESPN+ | 3,750 | 12–5 | |
| Mar. 14 | Georgia Southern | No. 24 | Springs Brooks Stadium • Conway, SC | **W** 5–1 | **Morrison** (3–0) | Grundy | None | ESPN+ | 2,700 | 13–5 | 1–0 |
| Mar. 15 (DH 1) | Georgia Southern | No. 24 | Springs Brooks Stadium • Conway, SC | **W** 7–2 | **Flukey** (2–0) | Lewis | **Jones** (1) | ESPN+ | 2,894 | 14–5 | 2–0 |
| Mar. 15 (DH 2) | Georgia Southern | No. 24 | Springs Brooks Stadium • Conway, SC | **W** 11–1; 7 inn | **Eikhoff** (4–0) | White | | ESPN+ | 4,000 | 15–5 | 3–0 |
| Mar. 18 | at Campbell* | No. 24 | Jim Perry Stadium • Buies Creek, NC | **W** 5–4 | **Carbone** (2–0) | Roberts | **Doran** (2) | FloSports | 782 | 16–5 | |
| Mar. 21 | at No. 25 Troy | No. 24 | Riddle–Pace Field • Troy, AL | **W** 11–3 | **Morrison** (4–0) | Tapper | **Carbone** (2) | ESPN+ | 2,214 | 17–5 | 4–0 |
| Mar. 22 | at No. 25 Troy | No. 24 | Riddle–Pace Field • Troy, AL | **L** 8–9 | Lyon | **Lynch** (1–1) | None | ESPN+ | 2,941 | 17–6 | 4–1 |
| Mar. 23 | at No. 25 Troy | No. 24 | Riddle–Pace Field • Troy, AL | **L** 5–9 | Stewart | **Eikhoff** (4–1) | None | ESPN+ | 2,329 | 17–7 | 4–2 |
| Mar. 25 | at No. 6 Clemson* | | Doug Kingsmore Stadium • Clemson, SC | **W** 8–2 | **Ellison** (1–1) | Samol | None | ACCNX | 5,043 | 18–7 | |
| Mar. 28 | at Texas State | | Bobcat Ballpark • San Marcos, TX | **W** 7–0 | **Morrison** (5–0) | Valentin (4–1) | None | ESPN+ | 1,423 | 19–7 | 5–2 |
| Mar. 29 | at Texas State | | Bobcat Ballpark • San Marcos, TX | **L** 0–1 | Tippie (2–0) | **Flukey** (2–1) | Laws (6) | ESPN+ | 1,638 | 19–8 | 5–3 |
| Mar. 30 | at Texas State | | Bobcat Ballpark • San Marcos, TX | **W** 10–3 | **Eikhoff** (5–1) | Teer (1–5) | None | ESPN+ | 1,407 | 20–8 | 6–3 |

April (14–3)
| Date | Opponent | Rank | Site/stadium | Score | Win | Loss | Save | TV | Attendance | Overall record | SBC record |
|---|---|---|---|---|---|---|---|---|---|---|---|
| Apr. 1 | Campbell | No. 21 | Springs Brooks Stadium • Conway, SC | **W** 15–1; 7 inn | **Jones** (1–1) | Roberts | None | ESPN+ | 3,750 | 21–8 | |
| Apr. 4 | Arkansas State | No. 21 | Springs Brooks Stadium • Conway, SC | **W** 4–1 | **Morrison** (6–0) | Galy | **Carbone** (3) | ESPN+ | 3,000 | 22–8 | 7–3 |
| Apr. 5 | Arkansas State | No. 21 | Springs Brooks Stadium • Conway, SC | **W** 4–1 | **Lynch** (2–1) | Turner | **Carbone** (4) | ESPN+ | 3,111 | 23–8 | 8–3 |
| Apr. 6 | Arkansas State | No. 21 | Springs Brooks Stadium • Conway, SC | **L** 0–2 | Hibbard | **Eikhoff** (5–2) | Richter | ESPN+ | 3,159 | 23–9 | 8–4 |
| Apr. 8 | at UNC Wilmington* | No. 21 | Brooks Field • Wilmington, NC | **W** 8–4 | **Horn** (1–1) | Thornton | None | ESPN+ | 1,654 | 24–9 | |
| Apr. 11 | at Georgia State | No. 21 | GSU Baseball Complex • Atlanta, GA | **W** 6–5 | **Carbone** (3–0) | Roberts | **Lynch** (1) | | 275 | 25–9 | 9–4 |
| Apr. 12 | at Georgia State | No. 21 | GSU Baseball Complex • Atlanta, GA | **W** 14–8 | **Horn** (2–1) | Hembree | None | | 230 | 26–9 | 10–4 |
| Apr. 13 | at Georgia State | No. 21 | GSU Baseball Complex • Atlanta, GA | **W** 4–2 | **Jones** (2–1) | Norman | **Lynch** (2) | | 287 | 27–9 | 11–4 |
| Apr. 15 | at Wake Forest* | No. 21 | David F. Couch Ballpark • Winston-Salem, NC | **L** 5–16; 8 inn | Bedford | **Appleman** (0–1) | None | ACCNX | 1,425 | 27–10 | |
| Apr. 17 | Marshall | No. 21 | Springs Brooks Stadium • Conway, SC | **W** 11–1; 7 inn | **Morrison** (7–0) | Blevins | None | ESPN+ | 4,073 | 28–10 | 12–4 |
| Apr. 18 | Marshall | No. 21 | Springs Brooks Stadium • Conway, SC | **W** 10–0; 7 inn | **Flukey** (3–1) | Miller | None | ESPN+ | 3,289 | 29–10 | 13–4 |
| Apr. 19 | Marshall | No. 21 | Springs Brooks Stadium • Conway, SC | **W** 13–5 | **Johnson** (3–0) | Krebs | None | ESPN+ | 2,757 | 30–10 | 14–4 |
| Apr. 22 | at Charleston* | No. 21 | CofC Baseball Stadium • Charleston, SC | **L** 2–4 | Murray | **Jones** (2–2) | Aiken | FloSports | 948 | 30–11 | |
| Apr. 25 | at James Madison | No. 21 | Eagle Field • Harrisonburg, VA | **W** 9–2; 11 inn | **Carbone** (4–0) | Horvath | None | ESPN+ | 644 | 31–11 | 15–4 |
| Apr. 26 | at James Madison | No. 21 | Eagle Field • Harrisonburg, VA | **W** 14–4; 7 inn | **Flukey** (4–1) | Costello | None | ESPN+ | 530 | 32–11 | 16–4 |
| Apr. 27 | at James Madison | No. 21 | Eagle Field • Harrisonburg, VA | **W** 8–4 | **Horn** (3–1) | Smith | None | ESPN+ | 516 | 33–11 | 17–4 |
| Apr. 29 | at UNC Greensboro* | No. 19 | UNCG Baseball Stadium • Greensboro, NC | **W** 8–2 | **Doran** (1–0) | Shuey | None | ESPN+ | 324 | 34–11 | |

May (10–0)
| Date | Opponent | Rank | Site/stadium | Score | Win | Loss | Save | TV | Attendance | Overall record | SBC record |
|---|---|---|---|---|---|---|---|---|---|---|---|
| May 2 | Appalachian State | No. 19 | Springs Brooks Stadium • Conway, SC | **W** 11–1; 8 inn | **Morrison** (8–0) | Cross | None | ESPN+ | 3,925 | 35–11 | 18–4 |
| May 3 | Appalachian State | No. 19 | Springs Brooks Stadium • Conway, SC | **W** 6–2 | **Flukey** (5–1) | Best | **Lynch** (3) | ESPN+ | 2,750 | 36–11 | 19–4 |
| May 4 | Appalachian State | No. 19 | Springs Brooks Stadium • Conway, SC | **W** 10–1 | **Potok** (2–1) | Clark | None | ESPN+ | 2,220 | 37–11 | 20–4 |
| May 6 | No. 9 Clemson* | No. 14 | Springs Brooks Stadium • Conway, SC | **W** 5–3 | **Horn** (4–1) | Gillen | **Lynch** (4) | ESPN+ | 5,300 | 38–11 | |
| May 8 | Louisiana–Monroe | No. 14 | Springs Brooks Stadium • Conway, SC | **W** 8–6 | **Johnson** (4–0) | Gregoire | **Carbone** (5) | ESPN+ | 2,658 | 39–11 | 21–4 |
| May 9 | Louisiana–Monroe | No. 14 | Springs Brooks Stadium • Conway, SC | **W** 10–0; 7 inn | **Morrison** (9–0) | Grigg | None | ESPN+ | 2,100 | 40–11 | 22–4 |
| May 10 | Louisiana–Monroe | No. 14 | Springs Brooks Stadium • Conway, SC | **W** 4–0; 5 inn | **Jones** (3–2) | Eager | None | ESPN+ | 2,111 | 41–11 | 23–4 |
| May 15 | at Old Dominion | No. 11 | War Memorial Stadium • Hampton, VA | **W** 6–3 | **Carbone** (5–0) | Moore | **Lynch** (5) | ESPN+ | 447 | 42–11 | 24–4 |
| May 16 | at Old Dominion | No. 11 | War Memorial Stadium • Hampton, VA | **W** 16–7 | **Morrison** (10–0) | Baynes | None | ESPN+ | 476 | 43–11 | 25–4 |
| May 17 | at Old Dominion | No. 11 | War Memorial Stadium • Hampton, VA | **W** 12–1^{7 inn} | **Jones** (4–2) | Sulpizio | None | ESPN+ | 519 | 44–11 | 26–4 |

Postseason

SBC Tournament (4–0)
| Date | Opponent | (Seed)/Rank | Site/stadium | Score | Win | Loss | Save | TV | Attendance | Overall record | Tournament record |
|---|---|---|---|---|---|---|---|---|---|---|---|
| May 21 | vs. (9) Georgia Southern | (1) No. 11 | Montgomery Riverwalk Stadium • Montgomery, AL | **W** 8–1 | **Eikhoff** (6–2) | Brady | None | ESPN+ | 632 | 45–11 | 1–0 |
| May 22 | vs. (4) Marshall | (1) No. 11 | Montgomery Riverwalk Stadium • Montgomery, AL | **W** 4–2 | **Flukey** (6–1) | Miller | **Lynch** (6) | ESPN+ | 671 | 46–11 | 2–0 |
| May 24 | vs. (4) Marshall | (1) No. 11 | Montgomery Riverwalk Stadium • Montgomery, AL | **W** 6–1 | **Morrison** (11–0) | Blevins | None | ESPN+ | 693 | 47–11 | 3–0 |
| May 25 | vs (2) Southern Miss | (1) No. 11 | Montgomery Riverwalk Stadium • Montgomery, AL | **W** 7–5 | **Horn** (5–1) | Payne | **Lynch** (7) | ESPN+ | 1,895 | 48–11 | 4–0 |

Conway Regional (3–0)
| Date | Opponent | (Seed)/Rank | Site/stadium | Score | Win | Loss | Save | TV | Attendance | Overall record | Tournament record |
|---|---|---|---|---|---|---|---|---|---|---|---|
| May 30 | (4) Fairfield | (1) No. 11 | Springs Brooks Stadium • Conway, SC | **W** 10–2 | **Flukey** (7–1) | Alekson | None | ESPN+ | 5,656 | 49–11 | 1–0 |
| May 31 | (3) East Carolina | (1) No. 11 | Springs Brooks Stadium • Conway, SC | **W** 18–7 | **Potok** (3–1) | Pruett | None | ESPN+ | 6,423 | 50–11 | 2–0 |
| Jun. 1 | (3) East Carolina | (1) No. 11 | Springs Brooks Stadium • Conway, SC | **W** 1–0 | **Carbone** (5–0) | Zayac | None | ESPN+ | 6,450 | 51–11 | 3–0 |

Auburn Super Regional (2–0)
| Date | Opponent | (Seed)/Rank | Site/stadium | Score | Win | Loss | Save | TV | Attendance | Overall record | Tournament record |
|---|---|---|---|---|---|---|---|---|---|---|---|
| Jun. 6 | (4) No. 9 Auburn | (13) No. 11 | Plainsman Park • Auburn, AL | **W** 7–6^{10 inn} | **Potok** (4–1) | Hetzler | **Lynch** (8) | ESPN2 | 7,892 | 52–11 | 4–0 |
| Jun. 7 | (4) No. 9 Auburn | (13) No. 11 | Plainsman Park • Auburn, AL | **W** 4–1 | **Johnson** (5–0) | Fisher | None | ESPN2 | 7,841 | 53–11 | 5–0 |

College World Series (3–2)
| Date | Opponent | (Seed)/Rank | Site/stadium | Score | Win | Loss | Save | TV | Attendance | Overall record | Tournament record |
|---|---|---|---|---|---|---|---|---|---|---|---|
| Jun 13 | Arizona | (13) No. 11 | Charles Schwab Field Omaha • Omaha, NE | **W** 7-4 | **Flukey** (8-1) | Hicks | **Carbone** (6) | ESPN | 24,058 | 54–11 | 6-0 |
| Jun 15 | (8) No. 8 Oregon State | (13) No. 11 | Charles Schwab Field Omaha • Omaha, NE | **W** 6-2 | **Morrison** (12-0) | Kleinschmidt | **Lynch** (9) | ESPN2 | 24,490 | 55–11 | 7-0 |
| Jun 18 | Louisville | (13) No. 11 | Charles Schwab Field Omaha • Omaha, NE | **W** 11-3 | **Eikhoff** (7−2) | Hartman | None | ESPN | 23,660 | 56–11 | 8-0 |
| Jun 21 | (6) No. 3 LSU | (13) No. 11 | Charles Schwab Field Omaha • Omaha, NE | **L** 0-1 | Anderson (12–1) | **Flukey** (8-2) | None | ESPN | 25,761 | 56–12 | 8-1 |
| Jun 22 | (6) No. 3 LSU | (13) No. 11 | Charles Schwab Field Omaha • Omaha, NE | **L** 3-5 | Eyanson (12–2) | **Morrison** (12–1) | Shores (2) | ABC | 24,734 | 56–13 | 8-2 |

== NCAA Tournament ==
=== Conway Regional ===
Conway Regional Teams
| (1) Coastal Carolina Chanticleers | (2) Florida Gators | (3) East Carolina Pirates | (4) Fairfield Stags |

First Round
1 | No. 13 Coastal Carolina | 10
4 | Fairfield | 2
3 | East Carolina | 11
2 | Florida | 6
Lower round 1
4 | Fairfield | 2
2 | Florida | 17

Semi-Finals
1 | No. 13 Coastal Carolina | 18
3 | East Carolina | 7
Lower final
3 | East Carolina | 11
2 | Florida | 4

Finals
1 | No. 13 Coastal Carolina | 1 | -
3 | East Carolina | 0 | -

=== Auburn Super Regional ===
Auburn Super Regional Teams
| (13) Coastal Carolina | vs. | (4) Auburn Tigers |

- ◆ Ranking based on NCAA tournament seeding

| Championship Series |
| No. 13 Coastal Carolina | 7^{10} | 4 | - |
| No. 4 Auburn Tigers | 6 | 1 | - |

=== College World Series ===
Sources: Seeds listed below indicate national seeds only. All times Central.

First round | Second round
13 | Coastal Carolina | 7
Arizona | 4
13 | Coastal Carolina | 6
8 | Oregon State | 2
8 | Oregon State | 4
Louisville | 3
Bracket 1
Arizona | 3
Louisville | 8
Louisville | 7
8 | Oregon State | 6
15 | UCLA | 6
Murray State | 4
15 | UCLA | 5
6 | LSU | 9
3 | Arkansas | 1
6 | LSU | 4
Bracket 2
Murray State | 0
3 | Arkansas | 3
3 | Arkansas | 7
15 | UCLA | 3

Semifinals
13 | Coastal Carolina | 11 | –
Louisville | 3 | –
6 | LSU | 6 | –
3 | Arkansas | 5 | –

Finals
13 | Coastal Carolina | 0 | 3 | –
6 | LSU | 1 | 5 | –

== Rankings ==
Ranking movements Legend: ██ Increase in ranking ██ Decrease in ranking — = Not ranked RV = Received votes
| | Week | | | | | | | | | | | | | | | | |
| Poll | Pre | 1 | 2 | 3 | 4 | 5 | 6 | 7 | 8 | 9 | 10 | 11 | 12 | 13 | 14 | 15 | Final |
|---|---|---|---|---|---|---|---|---|---|---|---|---|---|---|---|---|---|
| Coaches' | RV | RV* | RV | RV | RV | 25 | RV | 24 | 25 | 21 | 20 | 19 | 14 | 11 | 11 | 11 | 2 |
| Baseball America | — | — | — | — | — | — | — | — | — | 24 | 16 | 11 | 8 | 8 | 8 | 8* | 2 |
| NCBWA† | RV | RV | RV | RV | RV | RV | RV | 25 | RV | 20 | 17 | 21 | 19 | 15 | 12 | 10 | 2 |
| D1Baseball | — | — | — | 24 | 24 | 24 | — | 21 | 21 | 21 | 21 | 19 | 14 | 11 | 11 | 11 | 2 |
| Perfect Game | 23 | 19 | 20 | 15 | 15 | 16 | 21 | 19 | 19 | 18 | 14 | 14 | 12 | 10 | 9 | 9* | 2 |

† NCBWA ranks 30 teams in their preseason poll, but only ranks 25 teams weekly during the season.
* A new poll was not released for this week, so for comparison purposes, the previous week's ranking is inserted in this week's slot.

== Awards and honors ==
- June 18, 2025 – Caden Bodine was named the ABCA/Rawlings Gold Glove Awards winner
