= 2026 Coastal Carolina Chanticleers baseball team =

American college baseball season

2026 Coastal Carolina Chanticleers baseball

NCAA Tallahassee Regional
- Conference: Sun Belt Conference
- Record: 37–23 (21–9 SBC)
- Head coach: Kevin Schnall (2nd season)
- Associate head coach: Chad Oxendine (2nd season)
- Assistant coaches: Matt Williams (2nd season); Matt Schilling (19th season)
- Home stadium: Springs Brooks Stadium

2026 Sun Belt Conference baseball standings
	Conf.				Overall
Team	W		L	PCT	W		L	PCT
No. 24 Southern Miss ‍†‍‡‍^{y}	22	–	8	.733	40	–	14	.741
Coastal Carolina ‍‍‍^{y}	21	–	9	.700	36	–	19	.655
Appalachian State ‍‍‍	17	–	13	.567	30	–	22	.577
No. 8 Troy ‍‍‍^{y}	17	–	13	.567	29	–	27	.518
South Alabama ‍‍‍	17	–	13	.567	33	–	21	.611
Texas State ‍‍‍^{y}	16	–	14	.533	34	–	22	.607
Louisiana ‍‍‍^{y}	16	–	14	.533	34	–	21	.618
Old Dominion ‍‍‍	15	–	15	.500	29	–	25	.537
Georgia State ‍‍‍	14	–	16	.467	26	–	28	.481
Marshall ‍‍‍	13	–	17	.433	23	–	31	.426
Arkansas State ‍‍‍	12	–	18	.400	29	–	24	.547
Louisiana–Monroe ‍‍‍	12	–	18	.400	27	–	28	.491
James Madison ‍‍‍	11	–	19	.367	21	–	32	.396
Georgia Southern ‍‍‍	7	–	23	.233	16	–	40	.286
† – Conference champion ‡ – Tournament champion y – Invited to the NCAA Tournament; As of May 17, 2026; Rankings from D1Baseball

The 2026 Coastal Carolina Chanticleers baseball team represented Coastal Carolina University during the 2026 NCAA Division I baseball season. The Chanticleers played their home games at Springs Brooks Stadium and were led by second year head coach Kevin Schnall. They are members of the Sun Belt Conference.

== Preseason ==
=== Sun Belt Conference Coaches Poll ===
The Sun Belt Conference Coaches Poll was released February 4, 2026, and the Chanticleers were picked to finish first overall in the conference.

Coaches Poll
Predicted finish	Team	Votes (1st place)
1	Coastal Carolina	194 (12)
2	Southern Miss	182 (1)
3	Troy	166
4	Marshall	129
5	Louisiana	126 (1)
6	Texas State	114
7	Georgia Southern	104
7	Old Dominion	104
9	Arkansas State	96
10	App State	78
11	South Alabama	62
12	Georgia State	49
13	James Madison	48
14	ULM	18

=== Sun Belt Conference Preseason Pitcher of the Year ===
Cameron Flukey, Coastal Carolina (Jr., SP – Eggs Harbor Township, N.J.)

=== Preseason All-Sun Belt Team & Honors ===
- Cameron Flukey, Coastal Carolina (Jr., SP – Egg Harbor Township, N.J.)
- Hayden Johnson, Coastal Carolina (Jr., SP – Myrtle Beach, S.C.)
- Colby Allen, Southern Miss (Sr., SP – Louisville, Miss.)
- Ryan Lynch, Coastal Carolina (Gr., RP – Snohomish, Wash.)
- Tucker Stockman, Southern Miss (RS Jr., C – Athens, Ala.)
- Blake Cavill, Troy (Sr., 1B – Sydney, Australia)
- Joseph Zamora, App State (Gr., 2B – Miami, Fla.)
- Patrick Engskov, Arkansas State (Sr., SS – Little Rock, Ark.)
- Chase Mora, Texas State (Sr., 3B – Tomball, Texas)
- Ashton Quiller, Arkansas State (RS So., OF – Lake Charles, La.)
- Dean Mihos, Coastal Carolina (Sr., OF – Chester Springs, Pa.)
- Ben Higdon, Southern Miss (RS Sr., OF – Paducah, Ky.)
- Kameron Miller, App State (Jr., DH – Harrisburg, N.C.)
- Jimmy Janicki, Troy (So., UT – Downers Grove, Ill.)

== Personnel ==
2025 Coastal Carolina Chanticleers baseball team
Players
Coaches

#	Pos.	Name	B/T	Height	Weight	Year	Home town
1	INF	Robbie Cardone	L/R	5 ft 9 in (1.75 m)	145 lb (66 kg)	So	St George, Utah
2	RHP	Cameron Flukey	R/R	6 ft 6 in (1.98 m)	210 lb (95 kg)	Jr	Egg Harbor Township, New Jersey
3	INF	Lukas Buckner	L/R	5 ft 9 in (1.75 m)	170 lb (77 kg)	So	Knoxville, Tennessee
5	INF	Walker Mitchell	R/R	5 ft 11 in (1.8 m)	185 lb (84 kg)	Jr	Lexington, South Carolina
6	INF	Trace Mazon	R/R	6 ft 0 in (1.83 m)	180 lb (82 kg)	Jr	Aledo, Texas
7	INF	Blake Barthol	L/R	5 ft 9 in (1.75 m)	190 lb (86 kg)	Sr	Allentown, Pennsylvania
8	INF	Dean Mihos	R/R	5 ft 9 in (1.75 m)	170 lb (77 kg)	Sr	Chester Springs, Pennsylvania
10	INF	Ty Barrango (redshirt)	R/R	6 ft 0 in (1.83 m)	170 lb (77 kg)	Sr	San Mateo, California
11	INF	Colby Thorndyke (redshirt)	L/R	6 ft 1 in (1.85 m)	210 lb (95 kg)	Jr	Lumberton, North Carolina
12	OF	Rex Watson	L/L	5 ft 10 in (1.78 m)	195 lb (88 kg)	So	Manteca, California
13	C	Domenico Tozzi	R/R	5 ft 10 in (1.78 m)	195 lb (88 kg)	So	Camp Hill, Pennsylvania
16	LHP	Jackson Winer	L/L	6 ft 3 in (1.91 m)	235 lb (107 kg)	Fr	Charleston, South Carolina
18	LHP	Hayden Johnson	L/L	6 ft 5 in (1.96 m)	215 lb (98 kg)	Jr	Myrtle Beach, South Carolina
20	LHP	Case Bosch	L/L	6 ft 5 in (1.96 m)	225 lb (102 kg)	Fr	Jenison, Michigan
21	RHP	Jaxon Appelman	R/R	6 ft 2 in (1.88 m)	205 lb (93 kg)	So	Edison, New Jersey
22	OF	Blagen Pado	R/R	5 ft 10 in (1.78 m)	180 lb (82 kg)	Jr	Haymarket, Virginia
23	OF	Jordan Taylor	R/R	6 ft 1 in (1.85 m)	185 lb (84 kg)	Sr	Jacksonville, Florida
24	C	Brice Estep	R/R	5 ft 10 in (1.78 m)	190 lb (86 kg)	Jr	Fort Mitchell, Kentucky
25	RHP	Ross Norman	R/R	6 ft 7 in (2.01 m)	210 lb (95 kg)	Jr	Ringgold, Georgia
26	LHP	Colby Richardson	L/L	5 ft 10 in (1.78 m)	175 lb (79 kg)	Fr	Mullins, South Carolina
27	OF	Brayden Horton	L/R	6 ft 0 in (1.83 m)	200 lb (91 kg)	Sr	Sayre, Pennsylvania
30	RHP	Daniel Parker	S/R	6 ft 0 in (1.83 m)	181 lb (82 kg)	Fr	Hartsville, South Carolina
31	RHP	Scott Doran	R/R	6 ft 4 in (1.93 m)	220 lb (100 kg)	So	Erdenheim, Pennsylvania
32	RHP	Connor Kane	R/R	6 ft 1 in (1.85 m)	185 lb (84 kg)	Sr	Wilmington, North Carolina
33	LHP	Dalton Bisbano	L/L	6 ft 1 in (1.85 m)	190 lb (86 kg)	Fr	Summerville, South Carolina
34	INF	Phillip Ard	R/R	6 ft 3 in (1.91 m)	215 lb (98 kg)	Gr	Cochran, Georgia
37	C	Josh Toole	R/R	6 ft 0 in (1.83 m)	190 lb (86 kg)	Fr	Lancaster, Pennsylvania
38	RHP	Jackson Smallets	R/R	6 ft 4 in (1.93 m)	195 lb (88 kg)	Fr	Sicklerville, New Jersey
39	RHP	Darin Horn (redshirt)	R/R	6 ft 4 in (1.93 m)	200 lb (91 kg)	Sr	Bluffton, South Carolina
40	LHP	Dominick Carbone	L/L	5 ft 11 in (1.8 m)	180 lb (82 kg)	Jr	Rocky Point, New York
41	LHP	Kellen Karr	L/L	6 ft 6 in (1.98 m)	215 lb (98 kg)	Fr	Lincolnton, North Carolina
44	C	Cole Chamberlain	L/R	6 ft 2 in (1.88 m)	210 lb (95 kg)	So	Novato, California
45	RHP	Luke Jones	R/R	5 ft 11 in (1.8 m)	190 lb (86 kg)	So	Greenville, South Carolina
49	RHP	Ryan Lynch	R/R	6 ft 4 in (1.93 m)	225 lb (102 kg)	Gr	Snohomish, Washington

Head coach

Kevin Schnall (Coastal Carolina)

Assistant coach(es)

Chad Oxendine (Coastal Carolina)
Matt Williams (Spartanburg Methodist College)
Matt Schilling (Coastal Carolina)

Legend

- (C) Team captain
- (S) Suspended
- (I) Ineligible
- Injured
- Current redshirt

Roster
Last update: 4 February 2026

== Schedule and results ==
Legend
	Coastal Carolina win
	Coastal Carolina loss
	Postponement/Cancelation/Suspensions
**Bold**	Coastal Carolina team member
*	Non-Conference game

2026 Coastal Carolina Chanticleers baseball game log (37–23)
Regular season (36–19)

February (6–4)
Date	Opponent	Rank	Site/stadium	Score	Win	Loss	Save	TV	Attendance	Overall record	SBC record
Feb. 13	Fairfield*	No. 6	Springs Brooks Stadium • Conway, SC	**W** 5–3	**Horn** (1–0)	Miller	None	ESPN+	5,499	1–0	
Feb. 14 (DH 1)	Farfield*	No. 6	Springs Brooks Stadium • Conway, SC	**W** 5–1	**Norman** (1–0)	Grabmann	None	ESPN+	3,329	2–0	
Feb. 14 (DH 2)	Farfield*	No. 6	Springs Brooks Stadium • Conway, SC	**W** 5–0	**Doran** (1–0)	Sheldon	**Bosch** (1)	ESPN+	3,329	3–0	
Feb. 17	College of Charleston*	No. 6	Springs Brooks Stadium • Conway, SC	**L** 3–4	Rogers	**Richardson** (0–1)	None	ESPN+	3,933	3–1	
Baseball at the Beach
Feb. 20	VCU*	No. 6	Springs Brooks Stadium • Conway, SC	**W** 13–2^{8}	**Bosch** (1–0)	Weygandt	None	ESPN+	4,011	4–1	
Feb. 21	Illinois*	No. 6	Springs Brooks Stadium • Conway, SC	Cancelled (inclement weather)							
Feb. 22 (DH 1)	Illinois*	No. 6	Springs Brooks Stadium • Conway, SC	**L** 5–14	Hall	**Norman** (1–1)	Remington	ESPN+	2,296	4–2	
Feb. 22 (DH 2)	VCU*	No. 6	Springs Brooks Stadium • Conway, SC	**W** 6–3	**Horn** (2–0)	Gotschall	None	ESPN+	2,623	5–2	
Feb. 24	Campbell*	No. 9	Springs Brooks Stadium • Conway, SC	**W** 13–7	**Doran** (2–0)	Simmons	None	ESPN+	2,769	6–2	
Astros Foundation College Classic
Feb. 27	vs. No. 3 Texas*	No. 9	Daikin Park • Houston, TX	**L** 1–8	Riojas	**Jones** (0–1)	None	YouTube	13,427	6–3	
Feb. 28	vs. UTSA*	No. 9	Daikin Park • Houston, TX	**L** 10–16	Qualia	**Norman** (1–2)	None	YouTube	12,219	6–4	

March (15–3)
Date	Opponent	Rank	Site/stadium	Score	Win	Loss	Save	TV	Attendance	Overall record	SBC record
Astros Foundation College Classic
Mar. 1	vs. No. 25 Ole Miss*	No. 9	Daikin Park • Houston, TX	**W** 9–2	**Doran** (3–0)	Libbert	**Horn** (1)	YouTube	—	7–4	
Mar. 3	at No. 13 NC State*	No. 16	Doak Field • Raleigh, NC	**L** 4–6	Black	**Kane** (0–1)	None	ACCNX	2,806	7–5	
Mar. 6	East Carolina*	No. 16	Springs Brooks Stadium • Conway, SC	**W** 10–6^{10}	**Richardson** (1–1)	Rose	None	ESPN+	3,872	8–5	
Mar. 7	East Carolina*	No. 16	Springs Brooks Stadium • Conway, SC	**W** 7–1	**Norman** (2–2)	Antolick	None	ESPN+	4,362	9–5	
Mar. 8	East Carolina*	No. 16	Springs Brooks Stadium • Conway, SC	**L** 4–10^{6}	Moran	**Doran** (3–1)	None	ESPN+	3,567	9–6	
Mar. 10	No. 12 Wake Forest*	No. 16	Springs Brooks Stadium • Conway, SC	**W** 10–4	**Kane** (1–1)	Bowie	None	ESPN+	5,122	10–6	
Mar. 13	at App State	No. 16	Beaver Field at Jim and Bettie Smith Stadium • Boone, NC	**W** 10–6	**Horn** (3–0)	Smith	None	ESPN+	480	11–6	1–0
Mar. 14	at App State	No. 16	Beaver Field at Jim and Bettie Smith Stadium • Boone, NC	**W** 7–4	**Lynch** (0–1)	Tramontana	**Doran** (1)	ESPN+	1,119	12–6	2–0
Mar. 15	at App State	No. 16	Beaver Field at Jim and Bettie Smith Stadium • Boone, NC	**W** 8–7	**Richardson** (2–1)	Clark	**Horn** (2)	ESPN+	373	13–6	3–0
Mar. 18	at Campbell*	No. 16	Jim Perry Stadium • Buies Creek, NC	**L** 3–4	Clark	**Doran** (3–2)	None	FloCollege	698	13–7	
Mar. 20	James Madison	No. 16	Springs Brooks Stadium • Conway, SC	**W** 12–2^{7}	**Jones** (1–1)	Kuhle	**Horn** (3)	ESPN+	5,067	14–7	4–0
Mar. 21	James Madison	No. 16	Springs Brooks Stadium • Conway, SC	**W** 10–0^{7}	**Norman** (3–2)	Alexander	None	ESPN+	5,068	15–7	5–0
Mar. 22	James Madison	No. 16	Springs Brooks Stadium • Conway, SC	**W** 16–6^{7}	**Doran** (4–2)	Lutz	None	ESPN+	3,589	16–7	6–0
Mar. 24	at Clemson*	No. 15	Doug Kingsmore Stadium • Clemson, SC	**W** 11–9	**Horn** (3–0)	Nelson	None	ACC Network	4,934	17–7	
Mar. 27	at Marshall	No. 15	Jack Cook Field • Huntington, WV	**W** 11–9	**Parker** (1–0)	Blevins	**Lynch** (1)	ESPN+	1,556	18–7	7–0
Mar. 28	at Marshall	No. 15	Jack Cook Field • Huntington, WV	**W** 12–4	**Norman** (4–2)	Harlow	**Horn** (4)	ESPN+	1,671	19–7	8–0
Mar. 29	at Marshall	No. 15	Jack Cook Field • Huntington, WV	**W** 5–4^{10}	**Lynch** (2–0)	Baird	None	ESPN+	1,528	20–7	9–0
Mar. 31	at The Citadel*	No. 14	Joseph P. Riley Jr. Park • Charleston, SC	**W** 3–2	**Richardson** (3–1)	Van Slooten	**Doran** (2)	ESPN+	2,259	21–7	

April (10–6)
Date	Opponent	Rank	Site/stadium	Score	Win	Loss	Save	TV	Attendance	Overall record	SBC record
Apr. 2	South Alabama	No. 14	Springs Brooks Stadium • Conway, SC	**W** 12–2^{7}	**Jones** (2–1)	Heer	None	ESPN+	4,614	22–7	10–0
Apr. 3	South Alabama	No. 14	Springs Brooks Stadium • Conway, SC	**L** 2–15	Shineflew	**Norman** (4–3)	None	ESPN+	4,137	22–8	10–1
Apr. 4	South Alabama	No. 14	Springs Brooks Stadium • Conway, SC	**W** 8–7	**Richardson** (4–0)	Garmon II	None	ESPN+		23–8	11–1
Apr. 7	vs Wake Forest*	No. 11	Durham Bulls Athletic Park • Durham, NC	**W** 2–1	**Bosch** (2–0)	Marsten	**Lynch** (2)	ACCNX	1,059	24–8	
Apr. 10	at Arkansas State	No. 11	Tomlinson Stadium–Kell Field • Jonesboro, AR	**W** 10–7	**Kane** (2–1)	Foss	**Lynch** (3)	ESPN+	1,374	25–8	12–1
Apr. 11	at Arkansas State	No. 11	Tomlinson Stadium–Kell Field • Jonesboro, AR	**W** 4–3	**Horn** (5–0)	Maloney	**Lynch** (4)	ESPN+	2,112	26–8	13–1
Apr. 12	at Arkansas State	No. 11	Tomlinson Stadium–Kell Field • Jonesboro, AR	**L** 3–6	Farley	**Appelman** (0–1)	Garrison	ESPN+	863	26–9	13–2
Apr. 14	at Wake Forest*	No. 7	David F. Couch Ballpark • Winston-Salem, NC	**L** 5–10	Marsten	**Smallets** (0–1)	None	ACCNX	2,428	26–10	
Apr. 17	Georgia State	No. 7	Springs Brooks Stadium • Conway, SC	**W** 15–7	**Jones** (3–1)	Crooms	None	ESPN+	3,809	27–10	14–2
Apr. 18	Georgia State	No. 7	Springs Brooks Stadium • Conway, SC	**W** 7–2	**Norman** (5–3)	Caruso	**Horn** (5)	ESPNU	3,854	28–10	15–2
Apr. 19	Georgia State	No. 7	Springs Brooks Stadium • Conway, SC	**L** 5–11	Bartkowski	**Lynch** (2–1)	None	ESPN+	N/A	28–11	15–3
Apr. 21	at UNC Wilmington	No. 9	Brooks Field • Wilmington, NC	**L** 1–2	Thompson	**Horn** (5–1)	None	FloCollege	1,944	28–12	
Apr. 24	Texas State	No. 9	Springs Brooks Stadium • Conway, SC	**W** 6–2	**Jones** (4–1)	Cooper	None	ESPN+	3,567	29–12	16–3
Apr. 25	Texas State	No. 9	Springs Brooks Stadium • Conway, SC	**W** 2–1	**Horn** (6–1)	Froehlich	None	ESPN+	3,623	30–12	17–3
Apr. 26	Texas State	No. 9	Springs Brooks Stadium • Conway, SC	**L** 6–10	Kebrow	**Appleman** (0–2)	None	ESPN+	3,367	30–13	17–4
Apr. 28	at No. 2 North Carolina	No. 9	Boshamer Stadium • Chapel Hill, NC	**W** 12–2	**Parker** (2–0)	McDuffie	None	ACC Network	4,405	31–13	

May (5–6)
Date	Opponent	Rank	Site/stadium	Score	Win	Loss	Save	TV	Attendance	Overall record	SBC record
May 1	at Georgia Southern	No. 9	J. I. Clements Stadium • Statesboro, GA	**W** 8–7	**Kane** (3–1)	Pendley	**Horn** (6)	ESPN+	1,990	32–13	18–4
May 3 (DH 1)	at Georgia Southern	No. 9	J. I. Clements Stadium • Statesboro, GA	**W** 14–4^{7}	**Norman** (6–3)	Holder	**Horn** (7)	ESPN+	2,392	33–13	19–4
May 3 (DH 2)	at Georgia Southern	No. 9	J. I. Clements Stadium • Statesboro, GA	**L** 4–7	Mason	**Flukey** (0–1)	None	ESPN+	2,405	33–14	19–5
May 5	Clemson	No. 8	Springs Brooks Stadium • Conway, SC	**L** 4–8	Titsworth	**Smallets** (0–2)	None	ESPN+	6,103	33–15	
May 8	Old Dominion	No. 8	Springs Brooks Stadium • Conway, SC	**W** 16–8	**Parker** (3–0)	Kuskie	None	ESPN+	3,395	34–15	20–5
May 9	Old Dominion	No. 8	Springs Brooks Stadium • Conway, SC	**L** 3–6	Tanton	**Norman** (6–4)	None	ESPN+	3,377	34–16	20–6
May 10	Old Dominion	No. 8	Springs Brooks Stadium • Conway, SC	**L** 2–9	Sulpizio	**Flukey** (0–2)	None	ESPN+	3,315	34–17	20–7
May 12	The Citadel	No. 20	Springs Brooks Stadium • Conway, SC	**W** 5–3	**Bosch** (3–0)	Coulter	**Lynch** (5)	ESPN+	3,314	35–17	
May 14	at Louisiana	No. 20	M. L. Tigue Moore Field at Russo Park • Lafayette, LA	**L** 2–7	Brasch	**Jones** (4–2)	None	ESPN+	4,612	35–18	20–8
May 15	at Louisiana	No. 20	M. L. Tigue Moore Field at Russo Park • Lafayette, LA	**W** 6–0	**Horn** (7–1)	Herrmann	None	ESPN+	5,026	36–18	21–8
May 16	at Louisiana	No. 20	M. L. Tigue Moore Field at Russo Park • Lafayette, LA	**L** 2–3	Roman	**Norman** (6–5)	Papenbrock	ESPN+	4,936	36–19	21–9

Postseason (1–4)

SBC Tournament (1–2)
Date	Opponent	(Seed)/Rank	Site/stadium	Score	Win	Loss	Save	TV	Attendance	Overall record	SBCT record
May 20	vs. (7) Louisiana	(2); No. 24	Dabos Park • Montgomery, AL	**L** 11–12	Papenbrock (3–0)	**Appelman** (0-3)	Pearson (2)	ESPN+	472	36–20	0–1
May 21	vs. (3) Appalachian State	(2); No. 24	Dabos Park • Montgomery, AL	**W** 8–2	**Horn** (8–1)	Dirito (5–2)	None	ESPN+	342	37–20	1–1
May 22	vs. (7) Louisiana	(2); No. 24	Riddle–Pace Field • Troy, AL	**L** 4–5	Herrmann (7–4)	**Norman** (6–6)	Brasch (6)	ESPN+	787	37–21	1–2

Tallahassee Regional (0–2)
Date	Opponent	(Seed)/Rank	Site/stadium	Score	Win	Loss	Save	TV	Attendance	Overall record	Regional record
May 29	(3) NIU	(2)	Dick Howser Stadium • Tallahassee, FL	**L** 10–12	Cihocki (7–2)	**Norman** (6–7)	Cox (1)	ESPN+	3,808	37–22	0–1
May 30	at (1) No. 12 Florida State	(2)	Dick Howser Stadium • Tallahassee, FL	**L** 1–2	Purcell (4–2)	**Horn** (8–2)	Beard (1)	ESPN+	4,071	37–23	0–2

== NCAA Tournament ==
=== Conway Regional ===
Tallahassee Regional Teams
(1) Florida State Seminoles	(2) Coastal Carolina Chanticleers	(3) NIU Huskies	(4) St. John's Red Storm

First Round
1	Florida State	5
4	St. John's	6
3	NIU	12
2	Coastal Carolina	10
Lower round 1
1	Florida State	2
2	Coastal Carolina	1

Semi-Finals
4	St. John's	21
3	NIU	8
Lower final
3	NIU	4
1	Florida State	7^{10}

Finals
4	St. John's	5	-
1	Florida State	4	-

== Rankings ==
Ranking movements Legend: ██ Increase in ranking ██ Decrease in ranking — = Not ranked RV = Received votes
	Week																	
Poll	Pre	1	2	3	4	5	6	7	8	9	10	11	12	13	14	15	16	Final
Coaches'	7	7*	13	17	25	20	20	18	11	8	10	10	10	18	24	RV	RV*	
Baseball America	11	11	16	24	—	—	23	18	14	12	10	9	8	17	—	—*	—*	—
NCBWA†	7	6	10	16	22	18	16	13	10	7	9	10	8	16	22	22*	RV	
D1Baseball	6	6	9	16	16	16	15	14	11	7	9	9	8	20	24	—	—*	—
Perfect Game	17	16	18	—	—	—	24	14	10	7	10	10	7	12	22	22*	22*	

† NCBWA ranks 30 teams in their preseason poll, but only ranks 25 teams weekly during the season.
* A new poll was not released for this week, so for comparison purposes, the previous week's ranking is inserted in this week's slot.
