= 2025 Sun Belt Conference baseball tournament =

- Teams: 10
- Format: Double-elimination
- Finals site: Riverwalk Stadium; Montgomery, Alabama
- Champions: Coastal Carolina (3rd title)
- Winning coach: Kevin Schnall (1st title)
- MVP: Caden Bodine (Coastal Carolina)
- Television: ESPN+

2025 Sun Belt Conference baseball standings
	Conf.				Overall
Team	W		L	PCT	W		L	PCT
No. 11 Coastal Carolina ‍†‍‡‍^{y}	26	–	4	.867	51	–	11	.823
No. 12 Southern Miss ‍‍‍^{y}	24	–	6	.800	47	–	16	.746
Troy ‍‍‍	18	–	12	.600	39	–	21	.650
Marshall ‍‍‍	16	–	14	.533	33	–	26	.559
Louisiana ‍‍‍	16	–	14	.533	27	–	31	.466
Old Dominion ‍‍‍	15	–	15	.500	22	–	31	.415
Arkansas State ‍‍‍	14	–	16	.467	26	–	28	.481
Texas State ‍‍‍	14	–	16	.467	27	–	31	.466
Georgia Southern ‍‍‍	13	–	17	.433	28	–	31	.475
Appalachian State ‍‍‍	13	–	17	.433	23	–	31	.426
South Alabama ‍‍‍	12	–	18	.400	23	–	28	.451
Georgia State ‍‍‍	11	–	19	.367	26	–	30	.464
James Madison ‍‍‍	10	–	20	.333	17	–	38	.309
Louisiana–Monroe ‍‍‍	8	–	22	.267	22	–	33	.400
† – Conference champion ‡ – Tournament champion y – Invited to the NCAA Tournament; As of June 1, 2025; Rankings from D1Baseball

The 2025 Sun Belt Conference baseball tournament was held at Riverwalk Stadium in Montgomery, Alabama from May 20 to May 25. The tournament used a double-elimination format as in past years. The winner of the tournament, will earn the Sun Belt Conference's automatic bid to the 2025 NCAA Division I baseball tournament.

== Seeding ==
Since 2017, the top ten teams (based on conference results) from the conference earn are invited to the tournament. The teams will be seeded based on conference winning percentage, with the bottom four seeds competing in a play-in round. The remaining eight teams will then play a two bracket, double-elimination tournament. The winner of each bracket will play a championship final.

== Results ==
=== Play-in round ===
Tuesday, May 20
Team	R
#10 Appalachian State	0
#7 Texas State	3
Notes: Appalachian State eliminated

Tuesday, May 20
Team	R
#9 Georgia Southern	13
#8 Arkansas State	8
Notes: Arkansas State eliminated

=== Double-elimination round ===
First round
1	Coastal Carolina	8
9	Georgia Southern	1
4	Marshall	9
5	Louisiana	5
9	Georgia Southern	4
5	Louisiana	5
2	Southern Miss	9
7	Texas State	1
3	Troy	2
6	Old Dominion	4
3	Troy	4
7	Texas State	2

Second round
1	Coastal Carolina	4
4	Marshall	2
4	Marshall	17
5	Louisiana	13
2	Southern Miss	10^{7}
6	Old Dominion	0
3	Troy	9
6	Old Dominion	4

Semifinals
1	Coastal Carolina	6	-
4	Marshall	1	-
2	Southern Miss	2	–
3	Troy	1	–

Finals
1	Coastal Carolina	7
2	Southern Miss	5

== Schedule ==
Game	Time*	Matchup^{#}	Score	Notes	Reference
Tuesday, May 20
1	3:00pm	No. 7 Texas State vs No. 10 App State	3−0	App State eliminated	
2	6:30pm	No. 8 Arkansas State vs No. 9 Georgia Southern	13−8	Arkansas State eliminated	
Wednesday, May 21
3	9:00am	No. 3 Troy vs No. 6 Old Dominion	4−2		
4	12:30pm	No. 2 Southern Miss vs No. 7 Texas State	9-1		
5	4:00pm	No. 1 Coastal Carolina vs No. 9 Georgia Southern	8−1		
6	7:30pm	No. 4 Marshall vs No. 5 Louisiana	9−5		
Thursday, May 22
7	9:00am	No. 3 Troy vs No. 7 Texas State	4−2	Texas State eliminated	
8	12:30pm	No. 9 Georgia Southern vs No. 5 Louisiana	4−5	Georgia Southern eliminated	
9	4:00pm	No. 6 Old Dominion vs No. 2 Southern Miss	10−0^{7}		
10	7:30pm	No. 1 Coastal Carolina vs No. 4 Marhsall	4−2		
Friday, May 23
11	3:00pm	No. 6 Old Dominion vs No. 3 Troy	4−9	Old Dominion Eliminated	
12	6:30pm	No. 5 Louisiana vs No. 4 Marshall	13−17	Louisiana Eliminated	
Saturday, May 24
13	9:00am	No. 3 Troy vs No. 2 Southern Miss	1−2	No. 3 Troy Eliminated	
14	12:30pm	No. 4 Marshall vs No. 1 Coastal Carolina	6−1	No. 4 Marshall eliminated	
15	7:30pm	Game 10 Winner vs Game 12 Winner (if Necessary)	−	Elimination Game	
Sunday, May 25
17	1:00pm	No. 2 Southern Miss vs No.1 Coastal Carolina	7−5	Coastal Carolina wins champiponsip	
*Game times in CDT. # – Rankings denote tournament seed.

== All–Tournament Team ==
Player	Team
Caden Bodine (MVP)	Coastal Carolina
Cameron Flukely	Coastal Carolina
Wells Sykes	Coastal Carolina
Juju Stevens	Georgia Southern
Luke Yuhasz	Louisiana
Jackson Halter	Marshall
Eddie Leon	Marshall
Maika Niu	Marshall
Matthew Adams	Southern Miss
Nick Monistere	Southern Miss
Ozzie Pratt	Southern Miss
Bryson Dudley	Texas State
Gryason Stewart	Troy
