= 2025 Troy Trojans baseball team =

American college baseball season

2025 Troy Trojans baseball
- Conference: Sun Belt Conference
- Record: 39–21 (18–12 SBC)
- Head coach: Skylar Meade (4th season)
- Associate head coach: Ben Wolgamot (4th season)
- Hitting coach: Ryan Fineman (2nd season)
- Pitching coach: Adam Godwin (4th season)
- Home stadium: Riddle–Pace Field

2025 Sun Belt Conference baseball standings
	Conf.				Overall
Team	W		L	PCT	W		L	PCT
No. 11 Coastal Carolina ‍†‍‡‍^{y}	26	–	4	.867	51	–	11	.823
No. 12 Southern Miss ‍‍‍^{y}	24	–	6	.800	47	–	16	.746
Troy ‍‍‍	18	–	12	.600	39	–	21	.650
Marshall ‍‍‍	16	–	14	.533	33	–	26	.559
Louisiana ‍‍‍	16	–	14	.533	27	–	31	.466
Old Dominion ‍‍‍	15	–	15	.500	22	–	31	.415
Arkansas State ‍‍‍	14	–	16	.467	26	–	28	.481
Texas State ‍‍‍	14	–	16	.467	27	–	31	.466
Georgia Southern ‍‍‍	13	–	17	.433	28	–	31	.475
Appalachian State ‍‍‍	13	–	17	.433	23	–	31	.426
South Alabama ‍‍‍	12	–	18	.400	23	–	28	.451
Georgia State ‍‍‍	11	–	19	.367	26	–	30	.464
James Madison ‍‍‍	10	–	20	.333	17	–	38	.309
Louisiana–Monroe ‍‍‍	8	–	22	.267	22	–	33	.400
† – Conference champion ‡ – Tournament champion y – Invited to the NCAA Tournament; As of June 1, 2025; Rankings from D1Baseball

The 2025 Troy Trojans baseball team represents Troy University during the 2025 NCAA Division I baseball season. The Trojans are coached by fourth-year head coach, Skylar Meade, and play their home games at Riddle–Pace Field.

== Preseason ==
=== Signing Day Recruits ===
Player	Hometown	Previous Team
Pitchers
Nate Criswell	Oakdale, California	Modesto
Matt Dill	Dayton, Tennessee	Baylor School
Jackson Lucas	Venice, Florida	Venice HS
Brady Martin	Niceville, Florida	Niceville HS
Matteo Pare	LaSalle, Ontario, Canada	Pensacola State
Brady Richardson	Enterprise, Alabama	Enterprise HS
Cameron Tipton	Santa Rosa Beach, Florida	South Walton HS
Hitters
Zaid Diaz	Miramar, Florida	Chipola
Catchers
Jabe Boroff	Pike Road, Alabama	Enterprise State
Caden Reeves	Chapin, South Carolina	Chapin HS

=== Sun Belt Conference Coaches Poll ===
The Sun Belt Conference Coaches Poll was released February 6, 2025, and the Trojans were picked to finish second overall in the conference.

Coaches Poll
Predicted finish	Team	Votes (1st place)
1	Southern Miss	179 (5)
2	Troy	178 (4)
3	Louisiana	174 (3)
4	Coastal Carolina	161 (2)
5	Georgia Southern	125
6	James Madison	106
7	Old Dominion	105
8	Texas State	102
9	App State	94
10	South Alabama	93
11	Georgia State	49
12	Marshall	46
13	ULM	34
14	Arkansas State	24

== Personnel ==
2025 Troy Trojans baseball team
Players
Coaches

#	Pos.	Name	B/T	Height	Weight	Year	Home town
1	INF	Cason Eubanks (redshirt)	R/R	5 ft 9 in (1.75 m)	175 lb (79 kg)	So	Dothan, Alabama
2	OF	Shane Lewis (redshirt)	B/R	6 ft 2 in (1.88 m)	193 lb (88 kg)	Sr	Vicksburg, Mississippi
3	UTL	Tyler LeJeune	L/R	5 ft 10 in (1.78 m)	172 lb (78 kg)	Jr	Iota, Louisiana
4	INF	Peyton Watts	L/R	6 ft 1 in (1.85 m)	175 lb (79 kg)	So	Oxford, Alabama
5	UTL	Jimmy Janicki	R/R	6 ft 4 in (1.93 m)	231 lb (105 kg)	Fr	Downers Grove, Illinois
6	OF	Reid Broussard (redshirt)	R/R	6 ft 0 in (1.83 m)	200 lb (91 kg)	So	Denham Springs, Louisiana
7	UTL	Gavin Schrader	L/L	6 ft 4 in (1.93 m)	215 lb (98 kg)	Jr	Batavia, New York
8	UTL	Cooper Smith	R/R	5 ft 11 in (1.8 m)	193 lb (88 kg)	So	Louisville, Kentucky
10	UTL	Brock Tapper	L/L	6 ft 2 in (1.88 m)	196 lb (89 kg)	Jr	Nesbit, Mississippi
11	RHP	Colby Frieda	R/R	6 ft 3 in (1.91 m)	226 lb (103 kg)	Sr	St. Johns, Florida
12	OF	Steven Meier	L/L	6 ft 1 in (1.85 m)	195 lb (88 kg)	Sr	Kennewick, Washington
13	INF	Peryn Bland	R/R	6 ft 1 in (1.85 m)	183 lb (83 kg)	Fr	Meridian, Mississippi
14	OF	Dillon Kuehl	L/L	6 ft 0 in (1.83 m)	213 lb (97 kg)	Jr	Urbandale, Iowa
15	INF	Jakob Wax (redshirt)	R/R	6 ft 1 in (1.85 m)	175 lb (79 kg)	Sr	Prairieville, Louisiana
16	C	Jason Hawkins	R/R	6 ft 2 in (1.88 m)	210 lb (95 kg)	Sr	Allen, Texas
17	C	Brooks Bryan	L/R	6 ft 2 in (1.88 m)	222 lb (101 kg)	Jr	Opelika, Alabama
18	RHP	Noah Edders (redshirt)	R/R	6 ft 4 in (1.93 m)	232 lb (105 kg)	Jr	Woodridge, Illinois
19	RHP	Kelly Crumpton	R/R	6 ft 3 in (1.91 m)	182 lb (83 kg)	Sr	Jackson, Mississippi
21	LHP	Josh Dima (redshirt)	L/L	6 ft 2 in (1.88 m)	196 lb (89 kg)	Sr	Belleville, Illinois
22	UTL	Drew Nelson (redshirt)	L/L	5 ft 11 in (1.8 m)	210 lb (95 kg)	Jr	Troy, Alabama
23	OF	Houston Markham	L/R	5 ft 11 in (1.8 m)	201 lb (91 kg)	Fr	Pike Road, Alabama
26	RHP	Adam Falinski (redshirt)	R/R	6 ft 3 in (1.91 m)	221 lb (100 kg)	Sr	Howell, Michigan
27	RHP	Grayson Stewart (redshirt)	R/R	5 ft 11 in (1.8 m)	197 lb (89 kg)	Sr	Dothan, Alabama
28	OF	Harrison Bowman (redshirt)	R/R	6 ft 1 in (1.85 m)	205 lb (93 kg)	So	Owensboro, Kentucky
29	RHP	Dylan King (redshirt)	R/R	6 ft 4 in (1.93 m)	198 lb (90 kg)	Jr	Leola, Pennsylvania
30	LHP	Connor Burt	L/L	6 ft 3 in (1.91 m)	204 lb (93 kg)	Sr	Lithia, Florida
31	OF	Mike Bello	L/L	6 ft 2 in (1.88 m)	211 lb (96 kg)	Sr	Oak Ridge, New Jersey
32	C	Tyler Cook	R/R	5 ft 11 in (1.8 m)	188 lb (85 kg)	Fr	Glenwood Landing, New York
33	INF	Ty McGraw	L/R	6 ft 3 in (1.91 m)	215 lb (98 kg)	Fr	Gardendale, Alabama
34	INF	Blake Cavill	L/R	6 ft 1 in (1.85 m)	225 lb (102 kg)	Sr	Sydney, Australia
35	RHP	Jay Dill	R/R	6 ft 6 in (1.98 m)	240 lb (109 kg)	Sr	Dayton, Tennessee
36	LHP	Chase Carton	L/L	6 ft 8 in (2.03 m)	233 lb (106 kg)	Fr	Huntsville, Alabama
37	INF	Sean Darnell	L/R	6 ft 1 in (1.85 m)	206 lb (93 kg)	Jr	Wetumpka, Alabama
38	RHP	Zak Szabo (redshirt)	R/R	6 ft 3 in (1.91 m)	220 lb (100 kg)	So	Whitby, Ontario
40	LHP	Jacob Roettgen	L/L	6 ft 2 in (1.88 m)	253 lb (115 kg)	Sr	Jefferson City, Missouri
42	RHP	Luke Lyon (redshirt)	R/R	6 ft 2 in (1.88 m)	240 lb (109 kg)	Sr	Hattiesburg, Mississippi
43	LHP	Nolan Decker	L/L	6 ft 0 in (1.83 m)	210 lb (95 kg)	Fr	Noblesville, Indiana
44	RHP	Garrett Gainous (redshirt)	R/R	6 ft 4 in (1.93 m)	220 lb (100 kg)	Sr	Cairo, Georgia
45	UTL	Colton Walls	L/R	6 ft 4 in (1.93 m)	232 lb (105 kg)	So	Millbrook, Alabama
46	LHP	Chase Nelson	L/L	6 ft 0 in (1.83 m)	215 lb (98 kg)	Sr	Nashville, Tennessee
47	RHP	Noah Thigpen	R/R	6 ft 2 in (1.88 m)	218 lb (99 kg)	Fr	Lake Park, Georgia
48	LHP	Grady Gorgen	R/L	6 ft 3 in (1.91 m)	193 lb (88 kg)	Sr	Mineral Point, Wisconsin
49	LHP	George Welch	L/L	6 ft 3 in (1.91 m)	212 lb (96 kg)	Gr	Derry, New Hampshire
50	LHP	Pavlos Piperakis	L/L	6 ft 1 in (1.85 m)	185 lb (84 kg)	So	Plantation, Florida

Head coach

Skylar Meade (Eastern Illinois)

Assistant coach(es)

Ben Wolgamot (Purdue)
Ryan Fineman (Indiana)
Adam Godwin (Troy)

Legend

- (C) Team captain
- (S) Suspended
- (I) Ineligible
- Injured
- Current redshirt

Roster
Last update: 27 February 2025

== Schedule and results ==
Legend
	Troy win
	Troy loss
	Postponement/Cancelation/Suspensions
**Bold**	Troy team member

2025 Troy Trojans Game Log (37–19)
February (9–1)

#	Date	Opponent	Rank	Stadium	Score	Win	Loss	Save	TV	Attendance	Overall	SBC
1	February 14	Bellarmine*	No. 25	Riddle–Pace Field; Troy, AL	**W** 23–6	**Lyon** (1–0)	Carver (0–1)	None	ESPN+	2,402	1–0	—
2	February 15	Bellarmine*	No. 25	Riddle–Pace Field	**W** 7–3	**Edders** (1–0)	Matherly (0–1)	None	ESPN+	2,421	2–0	—
3	February 16	Bellarmine*	No. 25	Riddle–Pace Field	**W** 7–3	**Stewart** (1–0)	Horwith (0–1)	None	ESPN+	2,359	3–0	—
4	February 18	at Auburn*	No. 24	Plainsman Park; Auburn, AL	**L** 6–7	Johnston (1–0)	**Lyon** (1–1)	None	SECN+	4,940	3–1	—
5	February 21	Northwestern State*	No. 24	Riddle–Pace Field	**W** 7–1	**Gainous** (1–0)	Marionneaux (0–2)	None	ESPN+	1,928	4–1	—
6	February 22	Northwestern State*	No. 24	Riddle–Pace Field	**W** 14–12	**Edders** (2–0)	Bryan (0–1)	**Gorgen** (1)		2,012	5–1	—
7	February 23	Northwestern State*	No. 24	Riddle–Pace Field	**W** 14–4	**Nelson** (1–0)	Hillen (0–1)	None	ESPN+	1,837	6–1	—
8	February 25	at No. 18 Mississippi State*	No. 21	Dudy Noble Field; Starkville, MS	**W** 6–5	**Gorgen** (1–0)	Davis (0–1)	None	SECN+	9,915	7–1	—
9	February 26	UAB*	No. 21	Riddle–Pace Field	**W** 7–4	**Crumpton** (1–0)	Shelton (0–1)	None		2,107	8–1	—
10	February 28	Penn*	No. 21	Riddle–Pace Field	**W** 11–1	**Gainous** (2–0)	Katz (0–2)	None		2,415	9–1	—

March (12–7)

#	Date	Opponent	Rank	Stadium	Score	Win	Loss	Save	TV	Attendance	Overall	SBC
11	March 1	Penn*	No. 21	Riddle–Pace Field	**W** 10–9	**Frieda** (1–0)	Shurtleff (0–1)	None	ESPN+	2,803	10–1	—
12	March 2	Penn*	No. 21	Riddle–Pace Field	**W** 6–1	**Nelson** (2–0)	Cerwinski (0–1)	**Dill** (1)	ESPN+	2,583	11–1	—
13	March 5	at No. 23 Alabama*	No. 19	Sewell–Thomas Stadium; Tuscaloosa, AL	**L** 1–3	Heiberger (1–0)	**Falinski** (0–1)	Ozmer (4)	SECN+	2,990	11–2	—
14	March 7	at USC Upstate*	No. 19	Cleveland Harley Park; Spartanburg, SC	**W** 11–9	**Gorgen** (2–0)	Bianchini (2–3)	None		169	12–2	—
15	March 8	at USC Upstate*	No. 19	Cleveland Harley Park	**L** 4–5	Kaplan (2–0)	**Stewart** (1–1)	Phillips (1)	ESPN+	153	12–3	—
16	March 9	at USC Upstate*	No. 19	Cleveland Harley Park	**W** 14–7	**Nelson** (3–0)	Torres (2–1)	None	ESPN+	149	13–3	—
17	March 11	at Jacksonville State*	No. 21	Rudy Abbott Field; Jacksonville, AL	**L** 1–11^{7}	Scarborough (1–0)	**Falinski** (0–2)	None	ESPN+	411	13–4	—
18	March 14	at Louisiana	No. 21	Tigue Moore Field; Lafayette, LA	**W** 4–3	**Garrett** (3–0)	Holzhammer (0–2)	**Dill** (2)	ESPN+	4,128	14–4	1–0
19	March 15	at Louisiana	No. 21	Tigue Moore Field	**W** 8–5	**Stewart** (2–1)	Tollett (1–2)	**Dill** (3)	ESPN+	4,160	15–4	2–0
20	March 16	at Louisiana	No. 21	Tigue Moore Field	**L** 14–18	McGehee (2–3)	**Falinski** (0–3)	Osteen (1)	ESPN+	4,152	15–5	2–1
21	March 18	at UAB*	No. 25	Rickwood Field; Birmingham, AL	**W** 14–2^{7}	**Roettgen** (1–0)	Shelton (1–2)	None	ESPN+	217	16–5	—
22	March 21	No. 24 Coastal Carolina	No. 25	Riddle–Pace Field	**L** 3–11	Morrison (4–0)	**Tapper** (0–1)	Carbone (2)	ESPN+	2,214	16–6	2–2
23	March 22	No. 24 Coastal Carolina	No. 25	Riddle–Pace Field	**W** 9–8	**Lyon** (2–1)	Lynch (1–1)	None	ESPN+	2,941	17–6	3–2
24	March 23	No. 24 Coastal Carolina	No. 25	Riddle–Pace Field	**W** 9–5	**Grayson** (3–1)	Eikhoff (4–1)	None	ESPN+	2,329	18–6	4–2
25	March 25	Wofford*	No. 22	Riddle–Pace Field	**L** 3–14^{8}	Gray (1–0)	**Thigpen** (0–1)	None	ESPN+	2,412	18–7	—
26	March 26	at Florida A&M*	No. 22	Moore–Kittles Field; Tallahassee, FL	**W** 10–8	**Dill** (1–0)	Williams (1–1)	None		178	19–7	—
27	March 28	Marshall	No. 22	Riddle–Pace Field	**W** 4–3	**Garrett** (4–0)	Blevins (2–3)	**Frieda** (1)	ESPN+	2,757	20–7	5–2
28	March 29	Marshall	No. 22	Riddle–Pace Field	**W** 4–3	**Thigpen** (1–1)	Weyrich (2–3)	**Dill (4)**	ESPN+	2,782	21–7	6–2
29	March 30	Marshall	No. 22	Riddle–Pace Field	**L** 5–6^{11}	Weyrich (3–3)	**Stewart** (3–2)	None	ESPN+	2,189	21–8	6–3

April (11–5)

#	Date	Opponent	Rank	Stadium	Score	Win	Loss	Save	TV	Attendance	Overall	SBC
30	April 2	Florida A&M*	No. 20	Riddle–Pace Field	**W** 13–3^{7}	**King** (1–0)	Campa (0–1)	None	ESPN+	1,995	22–8	—
31	April 4	at Old Dominion	No. 20	Harbor Park; Norfolk, VA	**W** 7–0	**Gainous** (5–0)	Moore (1–4)	None	ESPN+	517	23–8	7–3
32	April 5	at Old Dominion	No. 20	Harbor Park	**W** 4–3	**Edders** (3–0)	Brown (2–2)	**Dill** (5)	ESPN+	482	24–8	8–3
33	April 6	at Old Dominion	No. 20	Harbor Park	**L** 5–9	Morgan (3–2)	**Falinski** (0–4)	Matela (1)	ESPN+	573	24–9	8–4
34	April 9	at No. 25 Virginia Tech*	No. 20	English Field; Blacksburg, VA	**L** 1–3	Berzonski (2–0)	**Nelson** (3–1)	Manning (1)	ACCNX	1,281	24–10	—
35	April 11	at James Madison	No. 20	Eagle Field; Harrisonburg, VA	**L** 3–7	Jackson (3–3)	**Gainous** (5–1)	None	ESPN+	153	24–11	8–5
36	April 12	at James Madison	No. 20	Eagle Field	**W** 6–3	**Edders** (4–0)	Smith (1–3)	**Thigpen** (1)	ESPN+	461	25–11	9–5
37	April 13	at James Madison	No. 20	Eagle Field	**W** 4–0	**Frieda** (2–0)	Mozoki (2–5)	**Lyon** (3)	ESPN+	326	26–11	10–5
38	April 17	Louisiana–Monroe	No. 20	Riddle–Pace Field	**W** 9–3	**Gainous** (6–1)	Cirelli (1–8)	None	ESPN+	1,993	27–11	11–5
39	April 18	Louisiana–Monroe	No. 20	Riddle–Pace Field	**W** 11–1^{7}	**Edders** (5–0)	Gonzalez (3–2)	None	ESPN+	2,283	28–11	12–5
40	April 19	Louisiana–Monroe	No. 20	Riddle–Pace Field	**L** 3–7	Gregoire (3–1)	**Dill** (1–1)	Brewer (1)	ESPN+	2,097	28–12	12–6
41	April 22	at Alabama State*	No. 20	Wheeler–Watkins Baseball Complex; Montgomery, AL	**W** 12–10	**Stewart** (4–2)	Douglas (0–1)	None		878	29–12	—
42	April 25	Texas State	No. 20	Riddle–Pace Field	**W** 3–2^{11}	**Dill** (2–1)	Laws (3–1)	None	ESPN+	2,689	30–12	13–6
43	April 26	Texas State	No. 20	Riddle–Pace Field	**W** 9–4	**Stewart** (5–2)	Tovar (2–5)	None	ESPN+	2,569	31–12	14–6
44	April 27	Texas State	No. 20	Riddle–Pace Field	**L** 3–14^{7}	Dudley (4–1)	**Falinski** (0–5)	None	ESPN+	2,047	31–13	14–7
45	April 29	Jacksonville State*	No. 20	Riddle–Pace Field	**W** 12–2^{7}	**Frieda** (3–0)	Wilson (2–2)	None	ESPN+	1,988	32–13	

May (5–6)

#	Date	Opponent	Rank	Stadium	Score	Win	Loss	Save	TV	Attendance	Overall	SBC
46	May 2	at South Alabama	No. 20	Eddie Stanky Field; Mobile, AL	**W** 5–2	**Thigpen** (2–1)	Shineflew (3–4)	**Dill** (6)	ESPN+	1,104	33–13	15–7
47	May 3	at South Alabama	No. 20	Eddie Stanky Field	**L** 7–11	Heer (6–2)	**Edders** (5–1)	Gillis (1)	ESPN+	1,091	33–14	15–8
48	May 4	at South Alabama	No. 20	Eddie Stanky Field	**W** 6–5	**Dill** (3–1)	Floyd (0–1)	**Frieda** (1)	ESPN+	1,164	34–14	16–8
49	May 6	No. 23 Alabama*	No. 19	Riddle–Pace Field	**L** 2–10	Finateri (3–0)	**Roettgen** (1–1)	None	ESPN+	3,892	34–15	—
50	May 7	at Samford*	No. 19	Joe Lee Griffin Stadium; Birmingham, AL	**W** 12–8	**Gorgen** (3–0)	Clevenger (1–2)	None	ESPN+	271	35–15	—
51	May 9	at Arkansas State	No. 19	Tomlinson Stadium–Kell Field; Jonesboro, AR	**W** 9–8^{12}	**Dill** (4–1)	Richter (3–3)	None	ESPN+	986	36–15	17–8
52	May 10	at Arkansas State	No. 19	Tomlinson Stadium–Kell Field	**W** 8–7	**Roettgen** (2–1)	Keithley (1–1)	**Frieda** (4)	ESPN+	946	37–15	18–8
53	May 11	at Arkansas State	No. 19	Tomlinson Stadium–Kell Field	**L** 6–7	Sewell (1–0)	**Lyon** (2–2)	Nelson (1)	ESPN+	893	37–16	18–9
54	May 15	No. 19 Southern Miss	No. 22	Riddle–Pace Field	**L** 3–4	Allen (6–4)	**Frieda** (3–1)	None	ESPN+	2,651	37–17	18–10
55	May 16	No. 19 Southern Miss	No. 22	Riddle–Pace Field	**L** 1–12^{8}	Sivley (8–1)	**Edders** (5–2)	None	ESPN+	2,791	37–18	18–11
56	May 17	No. 19 Southern Miss	No. 22	Riddle–Pace Field	**L** 5–8	Payne (2–0)	**Dill** (4–1)	Allen (11)	ESPN+	2,838	37–19	18–12

SBC tournament (0–0)

#	Date	Opponent	Rank	Stadium	Score	Win	Loss	Save	TV	Attendance	Overall	SBCT
57	May 21	vs. (6) Old Dominion	(3)	Riverwalk Stadium; Montgomery, AL					ESPN+			

NCAA tournament

#	Date	Opponent	Rank	Stadium	Score	Win	Loss	Save	TV	Attendance	Overall	NCAAT|-
TBD	TBD	vs. TBD		TBD					ESPN+			

== Rankings ==
Ranking movements Legend: ██ Increase in ranking ██ Decrease in ranking — = Not ranked RV = Received votes т = Tied with team above or below
	Week																		
Poll	Pre	1	2	3	4	5	6	7	8	9	10	11	12	13	14	15	16	17	Final
Coaches'	25	25*	24	21	22	RV	24	21	21	23т	23	22	18	20	RV	RV			
Baseball America	—	—	—	—	—	—	24	20	21	18	15	15	14	14	25	25*			
NCBWA†	28	24	20	20	18	18	17	20	19	22	18	20	21	17	22	RV			
D1Baseball	25	24	21	19	21	25	22	20	20	20	20	20	19	22	—	—			
Perfect Game	—	—	—	24	—	—	18	18	18	22	22	22	22	22	—	—			

† NCBWA ranks 30 teams in their preseason poll, but only ranks 25 teams weekly during the season.
* A new poll was not released for this week, so for comparison purposes, the previous week's ranking is inserted in this week's slot.
