= 2025 Southern Miss Golden Eagles baseball team =

American college baseball season

2025 Southern Miss Golden Eagles baseball

Hattiesburg Regional, 3–2
- Conference: Sun Belt Conference

Ranking
- Coaches: No. 14
- D1Baseball.com: No. 12
- Record: 47–16 (24–6 SBC)
- Head coach: Christian Ostrander (2nd season)
- Assistant coaches: Ladd Rhodes (2nd season); Travis Creel (6th season)
- Hitting coach: Ben Brewer (4th season)
- Pitching coach: Keller Bradford (2nd season)
- Home stadium: Pete Taylor Park

2025 Sun Belt Conference baseball standings
	Conf.				Overall
Team	W		L	PCT	W		L	PCT
No. 11 Coastal Carolina ‍†‍‡‍^{y}	26	–	4	.867	51	–	11	.823
No. 12 Southern Miss ‍‍‍^{y}	24	–	6	.800	47	–	16	.746
Troy ‍‍‍	18	–	12	.600	39	–	21	.650
Marshall ‍‍‍	16	–	14	.533	33	–	26	.559
Louisiana ‍‍‍	16	–	14	.533	27	–	31	.466
Old Dominion ‍‍‍	15	–	15	.500	22	–	31	.415
Arkansas State ‍‍‍	14	–	16	.467	26	–	28	.481
Texas State ‍‍‍	14	–	16	.467	27	–	31	.466
Georgia Southern ‍‍‍	13	–	17	.433	28	–	31	.475
Appalachian State ‍‍‍	13	–	17	.433	23	–	31	.426
South Alabama ‍‍‍	12	–	18	.400	23	–	28	.451
Georgia State ‍‍‍	11	–	19	.367	26	–	30	.464
James Madison ‍‍‍	10	–	20	.333	17	–	38	.309
Louisiana–Monroe ‍‍‍	8	–	22	.267	22	–	33	.400
† – Conference champion ‡ – Tournament champion y – Invited to the NCAA Tournament; As of June 1, 2025; Rankings from D1Baseball

The 2025 Southern Miss Golden Eagles baseball team represents University of Southern Mississippi during the 2025 NCAA Division I baseball season. The Golden Eagles are coached by second-year head coach, Christian Ostrander, and play their home games at Pete Taylor Park.

== Previous season ==
The 2024 Southern Miss Golden Eagles baseball team entered the season as the defending Sun Belt tournament champions. There, Southern Miss finished with a 43–20 record and a 20–10 record in Sun Belt Conference play. The Golden Eagles finished second to Louisiana in the Sun Belt regular season and earned the number two seed in the 2024 Sun Belt Conference baseball tournament. In the tournament, Southern Miss won the championship, earning their second Sun Belt title, their second-consecutive Sun Belt title, and their seventh overall conference tournament championship. The Golden Eagles earned the conference's automatic bid into the 2024 NCAA Division I baseball tournament.

In the NCAA tournament, Southern Miss was the number two seed in the Knoxville Regional. Southern Miss went 2–2 in the regional, beating Northern Kentucky and Indiana in the elimination game, and losing to Indiana in the opening game and hosts, Tennessee, in the regional final. Tennessee would ultimately go on to win the College World Series.

== Preseason ==
=== Coaches Poll ===
The Sun Belt Conference Coaches Poll was released February 6, 2025, and the Golden Eagles were picked to win the conference.

Coaches Poll
Predicted finish	Team	Votes (1st place)
1	Southern Miss	179 (5)
2	Troy	178 (4)
3	Louisiana	174 (3)
4	Coastal Carolina	161 (2)
5	Georgia Southern	125
6	James Madison	106
7	Old Dominion	105
8	Texas State	102
9	App State	94
10	South Alabama	93
11	Georgia State	49
12	Marshall	46
13	ULM	34
14	Arkansas State	24

== Game log ==
2025 Southern Miss Golden Eagles game log (47–16)
Regular Season: 41–13 (Home: 26–5; Away: 14–7; Neutral: 1–1)

February: 7–3 (Home: 7–1; Away: 0–2)
Date	TV	Rank	Opponent	Stadium	Score	Win	Loss	Save	Attendance	Overall	SBC
February 14	ESPN+		Lafayette*	Pete Taylor Park; Hattiesburg, Mississippi	**W** 9–2	**Middleton** (1–0)	Waterman (0–1)	**Allen** (1)	5,412	1–0	—
February 15	ESPN+		Lafayette*	Pete Taylor Park	**W** 7–6^{10}	**Och** (1–0)	A. Savedoff (0–1)	None	5,505	2–0	—
February 15	ESPN+		Lafayette*	Pete Taylor Park	**W** 18–4	**Adams** (1–0)	Helmick (0–1)	None	5,505	3–0	—
February 16	ESPN+		Lafayette*	Pete Taylor Park	**W** 5–1	**Harris** (1–0)	Florio (0–1)	None	5,385	4–0	—
February 18	ESPN+		No. 18 Mississippi State*	Pete Taylor Park	**W** 3–0	**Allen** (1–0)	Foster (0–1)	**Payne** (1)	5,741	5–0	—
February 21	ESPN+		Louisiana Tech*	Pete Taylor Park	**W** 4–0	**Middleton** (2–0)	Hubka (1–1)	**Och** (1)	5,336	6–0	—
February 22	ESPN+		Louisiana Tech*	Pete Taylor Park	**W** 8–4	**Sivley** (1–0)	Nichols (0–1)	**Allen** (2)	5,299	7–0	—
February 23	ESPN+		Louisiana Tech*	Pete Taylor Park	**L** 2–5	Cooley (2–0)	**Adams** (1–1)	Hooks (1)	5,534	7–1	—
February 25	SECN+	No. 22	at No. 24 Ole Miss*	Swayze Field; Oxford, Mississippi	**L** 8–15	**Jones** (1–0)	English (0–1)	None	10,455	7–2	—
February 28	ACCNX	No. 22	at No. 25 TCU*	Lupton Stadium; Fort Worth, Texas	**L** 2–5	Sloan (1–0)	**Allen** (1–1)	None	5,431	7–3	–

March: 13–5 (Home: 6–3; Away: 6–1; Neutral: 1–1)
Date	TV	Rank	Opponent	Stadium	Score	Win	Loss	Save	Attendance	Overall	SBC
March 1	ESPN+	No. 22	at No. 25 TCU*	Lupton Stadium	**W** 5–3	**Sivley** (2–0)	Lapour (1–2)	**Payne** (2)	4,942	8–3	—
March 2	ESPN+	No. 22	at No. 25 TCU*	Lupton Stadium	**W** 11–3	**E. Foley**	J. Gillmore	**S. Dessart**	550	9–3	—
March 5	SECN+	No. 20	at No. 18 Mississippi State*	Dudy Noble Field; Starkville, Mississippi	**L** 3–18^{7}	**Hungate** (1–0)	Best (0–1)	None	8,295	9–4	–
March 7	ESPN+	No. 20	UNCW*	Pete Taylor Park	**L** 3–6	**Taylor** (4–0)	Middleton (2–1)	**Baker** (1)	341	9–5	—
March 8	ESPN+	No. 20	UNCW*	Pete Taylor Park	**W** 2–1	**Allen** (2–1)	Smith (0–3)	None	5,365	10–5	—
March 9	ESPN+	No. 20	UNCW*	Pete Taylor Park	**W** 7–4	**Willoughby** (1–0)	Murdock (0–1)	**Allen** (3)	5,259	11–5	—
March 11	ESPN+	No. 22	UTRGV*	Pete Taylor Park	**W** 3–1	**Adams** (2–1)	Hernandez (1–1)	**Allen** (4)	5,231	12–5	—
March 14	ESPN+	No. 22	Old Dominion	Pete Taylor Park	**W** 11–2	**Middleton** (3–1)	Hubbell (0–1)	None	5,406	13–5	1–0
March 15	ESPN+	No. 22	Old Dominion	Pete Taylor Park	**W** 11–4	**Allen** (3–1)	Moore (0–2)	None	5,357	14–5	2–0
March 16	ESPN+	No. 22	Old Dominion	Pete Taylor Park	**L** 1–4	Morgan (2–1)	**Harris** (2–1)	Davis (1)	5,346	14–6	2–1
March 18	SMSN	No. 19	vs. No. 18 Ole Miss*	Trustmark Park; Pearl, Mississippi	**W** 6–2	**Best** (1–1)	Dennis (1–1)	**Allen** (5)	3,498	15–6	—
March 21	ESPN+	No. 19	at ULM	Lou St. Amant Field; Monroe, Louisiana	**W** 8–5	**Middleton** (4–1)	Grigg (0–5)	**Allen** (6)	1,156	16–6	3–1
March 22	ESPN+	No. 19	at ULM	Lou St. Amant Field	**W** 7–6	**Willoughby** (2–0)	Cirelli (1–4)	None	1,208	17–6	4–1
March 23	ESPN+	No. 19	at ULM	Lou St. Amant Field	**W** 14–2^{8}	**Harris** (3–1)	Gonzalez (1–1)	None	1,181	18–6	5–1
March 25	SMSM	No. 13	vs. Nicholls*	Keesler Federal Park; Biloxi, Mississippi	**L** 5–8	Jordan (3–2)	**Adams** (2–2)	Poirrier (1)	3,004	18–7	—
March 28	ESPN+	No. 13	South Alabama	Pete Taylor Park	**W** 8–2	**Middleton** (5–1)	Willingham (2–4)		5,428	19–7	6–1
March 29	ESPN+	No. 13	South Alabama	Pete Taylor Park	**L** 3–6	Heer (3–0)	**Allen** (3–2)	Shineflew (2)	5,444	19–8	6–2
March 30	ESPN+	No. 13	South Alabama	Pete Taylor Park	**W** 8–7^{12}	**Long** (1–0)	Garmon (1–4)	None	5,486	20–8	7–2

April: 12–5 (Home: 7–1; Away: 5–4)
Date	TV	Rank	Opponent	Stadium	Score	Win	Loss	Save	Attendance	Overall	SBC
April 1	ESPN+	No. 13	Tulane*	Pete Taylor Park	**W** 13–6	**Willoughby** (3–0)	Wilcenski (3–2)	None	5,322	21–8	—
April 4	ESPN+	No. 13	at Marshall	Jack Cook Field; Huntington, West Virginia	**L** 3–4	Blevens (3–3)	**Allen** (3–3)	None	1,234	21–9	7–3
April 5 (DH 1)	ESPN+	No. 13	at Marshall	Jack Cook Field	**W** 4–3	**Och** (2–0)	Krebs (2–1)	None	1,305	22–9	8–3
April 5 (DH 2)	ESPN+	No. 13	at Marshall	Jack Cook Field	**L** 0–6	Moak (1–1)	**Harris** (3–2)	None	1,305	22–10	8–4
April 8	SECN+	No. 23	at No. 12 Alabama*	Sewell–Thomas Stadium; Tuscaloosa, Alabama	**L** 6–10	Heiberger (3–1)	**Sivley** (2–1)	Ozmer (10)	3,821	22–11	—
April 11	ESPN+	No. 23	at Texas State	Bobcat Ballpark; San Marcos, Texas	**W** 5–2	**Middleton** (6–1)	Valentin (4–3)	None	1,577	23–11	9–4
April 12	ESPN+	No. 23	at Texas State	Bobcat Ballpark	**W** 12–1	**Harris** (4–2)	Tovar (1–3)	None	1,670	24–11	10–4
April 13	ESPN+	No. 23	at Texas State	Bobcat Ballpark	**L** 10–11	Laws (3–0)	**Allen** (3–4)	None	1,419	24–12	10–5
April 15		No. 23	at Southeastern Louisiana	Pat Kenelly Diamond; Hammond, Louisiana	**W** 8–7	**Sunstrom** (1–0)	St. Pierre (1–1)	**Allen** (7)	1,682	25–12	—
April 17	ESPN+	No. 23	Georgia State	Pete Taylor Park	**W** 8–1	**Middleton** (7–1)	Roberts (6–3)	None	5,408	26–12	11–5
April 18	ESPN+	No. 23	Georgia State	Pete Taylor Park	**L** 2–12	Hembree (1–1)	**Harris (4–3)**	None	5,434	26–13	11–6
April 19	ESPN+	No. 23	Georgia State	Pete Taylor Park	**W** 15–9	**Payne** (1–0)	White (5–4)	None	5,379	27–13	12–6
April 22	ESPN+	No. 22	Tulane*	Pete Taylor Park	**Canceled**						
April 23	ESPN+	No. 22	Southeastern Louisiana*	Pete Taylor Park	**W** 5–4	**Allen** (4–4)	Vosburg (2–3)	None	5,369	28–13	—
April 25	ESPN+	No. 22	at Appalachian State	Jim and Bettie Smith Stadium; Boone, North Carolina	**W** 10–1	**Middleton** (8–1)	Cross (6–2)	None	501	29–13	13–6
April 26	ESPN+	No. 22	at Appalachian State	Jim and Bettie Smith Stadium	**W** 7–3	**Adams** (3–2)	Wilson (3–2)	**Allen** (8)	978	30–13	14–6
April 27	ESPN+	No. 22	at Appalachian State	Jim and Bettie Smith Stadium	**W** 7–6	**Sivley** (3–1)	Harris (1–4)	**Payne** (3)	784	31–13	15–6
April 29	ESPN+	No. 22	New Orleans*	Pete Taylor Park	**W** 9–4	**Sivley** (4–1)	Austin (4–3)	**Allen** (9)	5,234	32–13	—

May: 9–0 (Home: 6–0; Away: 3–0)
Date	TV	Rank	Opponent	Stadium	Score	Win	Loss	Save	Attendance	Overall	SBC
May 2	ESPN+	No. 22	Arkansas State	Pete Taylor Park	**W** 2–1	**Allen** (5–4)	Van Der Leile (3–3)	None	5,464	33–13	16–6
May 3	ESPN+	No. 22	Arkansas State	Pete Taylor Park	**W** 8–0	**Adams** (4–2)	**Weimer** (1–1)	None	5,481	34–13	17–6
May 4	ESPN+	No. 22	Arkansas State	Pete Taylor Park	**W** 14–2^{7}	**Sunstrom** (2–0)	Hibbard (5–4)	None	5,391	35–13	18–6
May 9	ESPN+	No. 21	Louisiana	Pete Taylor Park	**W** 11–3	**Middleton** (9–1)	Hermann (3–4)	None	5,351	36–13	19–6
May 10	ESPN+	No. 21	Louisiana	Pete Taylor Park	**W** 15–5^{7}	**Adams** (5–2)	Morgan (4–2)	**Allen** (10)	5,431	37–13	20–6
May 11	ESPN+	No. 21	Louisiana	Pete Taylor Park	**W** 9–6	**Silvey** (5–1)	Theut (1–2)	**Payne** (4)	5,306	38–13	21–6
May 15	ESPN+	No. 19	at No. 22 Troy	Riddle–Pace Field; Troy, Alabama	**W** 4–3	**Allen** (6–4)	Frieda (3–1)	None	2,651	39–13	22–6
May 16	ESPN+	No. 19	at No. 22 Troy	Riddle–Pace Field	**W** 12–1^{8}	**Sivley** (8–1)	Edders (5–2)	None	2,791	40–13	23–6
May 17	ESPN+	No. 19	at No. 22 Troy	Riddle–Pace Field	**W** 8–5	**Payne** (2–0)	Dill (4–1)	**Allen** (11)	2,838	41–13	24–6

Postseason (6–3)

Sun Belt Tournament (3–1)
Date	TV	Rank	Opponent	Stadium	Score	Win	Loss	Save	Attendance	Overall	SBC Tournament
May 21	ESPN+	No. 12 (2)	(7) Texas State	Montgomery Riverwalk Stadium; Montgomery, Alabama	**W** 9–1	**Middleton** (10-1)	Tovar	None	817	42-13	1-0
May 22	ESPN+	No. 12 (2)	(7) Old Dominion	Montgomery Riverwalk Stadium	**W** 10–1^{7}	**Adams** (6-2)	Morgan	None	876	43-13	2-0
May 24	ESPN+	No. 12 (2)	(3) Troy	Montgomery Riverwalk Stadium	**W** 2–1	**Silvey** (7-1)	Nelson	**Allen** (12)	1,542	44-13	3-0
May 25	ESPN+	No. 12 (2)	(1) No. 11 Coastal Carolina	Montgomery Riverwalk Stadium	**L** 5–7	Horn	**Payne** (2-1)	Lynch	1,895	44–14	3-1

Hattiesburg Regional (3–2)
Date	TV	Rank	Opponent	Stadium	Score	Win	Loss	Save	Attendance	Overall	NCAA Tournament
May 30	ESPN+	No. 16 (1)	(4) Columbia	Pete Taylor Park	**L** 4–11	Sotiropoulos (5–3)	**Adams** (6–3)	None	5,329	44–15	0–1
May 31	ESPN2	No. 16 (1)	(2) No. 23 Alabama	Pete Taylor Park	**W** 6–5	**Allen** (7–4)	Ozmer (4–2)	None	5,329	45–15	1–1
June 1	ESPN+	No. 16 (1)	(4) Columbia	Pete Taylor Park	**W** 8–1	**Harris** (5–3)	Sheets (3–4)	**Payne** (5)	5,329	46–15	2–1
June 1	ESPN+	No. 16 (1)	(3) Miami	Pete Taylor Park	**W** 17–6	**Sunstrom** (3–0)	DeRias (2–3)	None	5,329	47–15	3–1
June 2	ESPNU	No. 16 (1)	(3) Miami	Pete Taylor Park	**L** 4–5	Smith (3–0)	**Adams** (6–4)	Walters (10)	5,329	47–16	3–2

- Win
- Loss
- Postponement
- Bold: Golden Eagles team member
- Rankings from D1 Baseball.
- (#) Tournament seedings in parentheses.
- * indicates a non-conference game.

== Rankings ==
Ranking movements Legend: ██ Increase in ranking ██ Decrease in ranking — = Not ranked RV = Received votes
	Week																		
Poll	Pre	1	2	3	4	5	6	7	8	9	10	11	12	13	14	15	16	17	Final
Coaches'	RV	RV*	23	22	25	23	16	16	24	RV	24	23	21	19	14	14			
Baseball America	—	—	—	24	—	—	23	24	—	—	—	—	—	24	17	17*			
NCBWA†	26	23	21	24	22	21	15	16	25	RV	24	24	23	19	18	13			
D1Baseball	—	—	22	20	22	19	13	13	23	23	22	22	21	19	12	12			
Perfect Game	—	—	—	25	—	—	—	—	—	—	—	—	—	21	15	15*			

† NCBWA ranks 30 teams in their preseason poll, but only ranks 25 teams weekly during the season.
* A new poll was not released for this week, so for comparison purposes, the previous week's ranking is inserted in this week's slot.
