= 2025 Louisiana Ragin' Cajuns baseball team =

Baseball team of the University of Louisiana at Lafayette

2025 Louisiana Ragin' Cajuns baseball
- Conference: Sun Belt Conference
- Record: 27–31 (16–14 SBC)
- Head coach: Matt Deggs (6th season)
- Assistant coaches: Seth Thibodeaux; Zach Lafleur; Gunner Leger
- Home stadium: M. L. Tigue Moore Field at Russo Park

2025 Sun Belt Conference baseball standings
	Conf.				Overall
Team	W		L	PCT	W		L	PCT
No. 11 Coastal Carolina ‍†‍‡‍^{y}	26	–	4	.867	51	–	11	.823
No. 12 Southern Miss ‍‍‍^{y}	24	–	6	.800	47	–	16	.746
Troy ‍‍‍	18	–	12	.600	39	–	21	.650
Marshall ‍‍‍	16	–	14	.533	33	–	26	.559
Louisiana ‍‍‍	16	–	14	.533	27	–	31	.466
Old Dominion ‍‍‍	15	–	15	.500	22	–	31	.415
Arkansas State ‍‍‍	14	–	16	.467	26	–	28	.481
Texas State ‍‍‍	14	–	16	.467	27	–	31	.466
Georgia Southern ‍‍‍	13	–	17	.433	28	–	31	.475
Appalachian State ‍‍‍	13	–	17	.433	23	–	31	.426
South Alabama ‍‍‍	12	–	18	.400	23	–	28	.451
Georgia State ‍‍‍	11	–	19	.367	26	–	30	.464
James Madison ‍‍‍	10	–	20	.333	17	–	38	.309
Louisiana–Monroe ‍‍‍	8	–	22	.267	22	–	33	.400
† – Conference champion ‡ – Tournament champion y – Invited to the NCAA Tournament; As of June 1, 2025; Rankings from D1Baseball

The 2025 Louisiana Ragin' Cajuns baseball team represented the University of Louisiana at Lafayette during the 2024 NCAA Division I baseball season. The Ragin' Cajuns played their home games at M. L. Tigue Moore Field at Russo Park and were led by sixth–year head coach Matt Deggs. They were members of the Sun Belt Conference.

== Preseason ==
=== Sun Belt Conference Coaches Poll ===
The Sun Belt Conference Coaches Poll was released on February 5, 2025. Louisiana was picked to finish third with 174 votes and 3 first place votes. Sophomore pitcher Chase Morgan was named Sun Belt Preseason Pitcher of the Year.

Coaches poll
Predicted finish	Team	Votes (1st place)
1	Southern Miss	179 (5)
2	Troy	178 (4)
3	Louisiana	174 (3)
4	Coastal Carolina	161 (2)
5	Georgia Southern	125
6	James Madison	106
7	Old Dominion	105
8	Texas State	102
9	Appalachian State	94
10	South Alabama	93
11	Georgia State	49
12	Marshall	46
13	Louisiana–Monroe	34
14	Arkansas State	24

=== Preseason All-Sun Belt Team & Honors ===
- Chase Morgan, Louisiana (So., SP – Cypress, Texas)
- Bryce Blevins, Marshall (Jr., SP – Louisa, Ky.)
- Colby Allen, Southern Miss (Jr., SP – Louisville, Miss.)
- Max Kuhle, James Madison (Jr., RP – Virginia Beach, Va.)
- Caden Bodine, Coastal Carolina (Jr., C – Haddon Heights, N.J.)
- Matthew Russo, Southern Miss (Jr., 1B – Madisonville, La.)
- Blake Barthol, Coastal Carolina (Jr., 2B – Allentown, Pa.)
- Ozzie Pratt, Southern Miss (Sr., SS – Alesville, Miss.)
- Lee Amedee, Louisiana (Jr., 3B – Gonzales, La.)
- Josh Tate, Georgia Southern (Jr., OF – Peachtree City, Ga.)
- Luke Waters, Old Dominion (Sr., OF – Laurel, Del.)
- Davis Gillespie, Southern Miss (RS So., OF – Birmingham, Ala.)
- Ryan Dooley, James Madison (Sr., DH – Reston, Va.)
- Nick Monistere, Southern Miss (Jr., UT – Brandon, Miss.)

== Personnel ==
2025 Louisiana Ragin' Cajuns baseball team
Players
Coaches

#	Pos.	Name	B/T	Height	Weight	Year	Home town
1	OF	Maddox Mandino	L/L	5 ft 9 in (1.75 m)	175 lb (79 kg)	Jr	Minden, Louisiana
4	INF	Sam Ardoin	R/R	6 ft 2 in (1.88 m)	170 lb (77 kg)	So	Moss Bluff, Louisiana
5	INF	Trip Dobson	R/R	6 ft 1 in (1.85 m)	190 lb (86 kg)	Fr	Baton Rouge, Louisiana
6	OF	Mark Collins	R/R	6 ft 2 in (1.88 m)	200 lb (91 kg)	Fr	Opelousas, Louisiana
7	INF	Griffin Hebert	L/R	5 ft 11 in (1.8 m)	200 lb (91 kg)	Fr	Lake Charles, Louisiana
8	INF	Lee Amedee	L/R	6 ft 0 in (1.83 m)	205 lb (93 kg)	Jr	Gonzales, Louisiana
9	INF	Drew Markle	R/R	6 ft 4 in (1.93 m)	185 lb (84 kg)	So	Katy, Texas
10	INF	Connor Cuff	R/R	6 ft 4 in (1.93 m)	215 lb (98 kg)	So	Carthage, Texas
11	OF	Brooks Wright	L/R	6 ft 3 in (1.91 m)	185 lb (84 kg)	Fr	Baton Rouge, Louisiana
12	OF	Caleb Stelly	R/R	6 ft 1 in (1.85 m)	205 lb (93 kg)	Jr	Baton Rouge, Louisiana
13	INF	Casey Artigues	L/R	5 ft 10 in (1.78 m)	180 lb (82 kg)	Jr	Hammond, Louisiana
14	INF	Blaine Lucas	L/R	6 ft 0 in (1.83 m)	185 lb (84 kg)	Fr	Tomball, Texas
15	C	Clayton Pourciau (redshirt)	R/R	6 ft 0 in (1.83 m)	195 lb (88 kg)	Fr	Livonia, Louisiana
16	OF	Carson Hepworth	R/R	6 ft 2 in (1.88 m)	195 lb (88 kg)	Jr	Gulf Breeze, Florida
18	LHP	Chase Morgan	L/L	6 ft 3 in (1.91 m)	195 lb (88 kg)	So	Cypress, Texas
19	LHP	Dylan Theut	R/L	5 ft 11 in (1.8 m)	185 lb (84 kg)	RS Sr	Fulshear, Texas
20	RHP	JR Tollett	R/R	6 ft 2 in (1.88 m)	190 lb (86 kg)	So	Ruston, Louisiana
21	INF	Kasen Bellard	R/R	6 ft 0 in (1.83 m)	180 lb (82 kg)	Jr	Lake Charles, Louisiana
22	INF	Owen Galt	R/R	5 ft 10 in (1.78 m)	190 lb (86 kg)	Fr	Lake Charles, Louisiana
23	RHP	Tate Hess	R/R	6 ft 2 in (1.88 m)	220 lb (100 kg)	So	Singer, Louisiana
25	LHP	Riley Marcotte	L/L	6 ft 2 in (1.88 m)	180 lb (82 kg)	So	Loreauville, Louisiana
26	C	Parker Smith	R/R	6 ft 2 in (1.88 m)	195 lb (88 kg)	Fr	Montgomery, Texas
27	RHP	Matthew Holzhammer	R/R	6 ft 4 in (1.93 m)	210 lb (95 kg)	Sr	Wister, Oklahoma
29	RHP	Blake McGehee	R/R	6 ft 0 in (1.83 m)	190 lb (86 kg)	RS Jr	Alexandria, Louisiana
30	RHP	Will Taylor	R/R	6 ft 3 in (1.91 m)	185 lb (84 kg)	Fr	Lafayette, Louisiana
33	OF	Conor Higgs (redshirt)	L/L	6 ft 2 in (1.88 m)	195 lb (88 kg)	Sr	Texas City, Texas
34	OF	Luke Yuhasz	R/R	6 ft 4 in (1.93 m)	205 lb (93 kg)	Jr	Moss Bluff, Louisiana
39	LHP	Andrew Herrmann	L/L	6 ft 3 in (1.91 m)	215 lb (98 kg)	Sr	Kennesaw, Georgia
40	RHP	James Trimble (redshirt)	R/R	6 ft 0 in (1.83 m)	185 lb (84 kg)	So	Galveston, Texas
47	C	Jose Torres	R/R	5 ft 8 in (1.73 m)	195 lb (88 kg)	Sr	San Miguelito, Panama
53	RHP	Murphy Brooks	R/R	6 ft 3 in (1.91 m)	230 lb (104 kg)	RS So	Cypress, Texas

Head coach

Matt Deggs (Northwestern State)

Assistant coach(es)

Seth Thibodeaux (William Carey)
Zach Lafleur (Louisiana)
Gunner Leger (Louisiana)

Legend

- (C) Team captain
- (S) Suspended
- (I) Ineligible
- Injured
- Current redshirt

Roster
Last update: 26 December 2025

== Schedule and results ==
Legend
	Louisiana win
	Louisiana loss
	Postponement/Cancelation/Suspensions
**Bold**	Louisiana team member

2025 Louisiana Ragin' Cajuns baseball game log
Regular season (28–29)

February (5–5)
Date	Opponent	Rank	Site/stadium	Score	Win	Loss	Save	TV	Attendance	Overall record	SBC record
Feb. 14	San Jose State		M. L. Tigue Moore Field at Russo Park • Lafayette, LA	**W** 7–2	**Morgan** (1–0)	Gutierrez (0–1)	**Trimble** (1)	ESPN+	4,862	1–0	
Feb. 15	San Jose State		M. L. Tigue Moore Field at Russo Park • Lafayette, LA	**L** 3–8	McGrew (1–0)	**McGehee** (0–1)	None	ESPN+	4,123	1–1	
Feb. 16	San Jose State		M. L. Tigue Moore Field at Russo Park • Lafayette, LA	**L** 4–12	George (1–0)	**Hess** (0–1)	None	ESPN+	4,037	1–2	
Feb. 18	Texas Southern		M. L. Tigue Moore Field at Russo Park • Lafayette, LA	**W** 14–11	**Tollett** (1–0)	Garcia (0–1)	**Holzhammer** (1)	ESPN+	2,461	2–2	
Feb. 21	No. 23 Nebraska		M. L. Tigue Moore Field at Russo Park • Lafayette, LA	**L** 1–6	McConnaughey (1–1)	**Morgan** (1–1)	None	ESPN+	4,085	2–3	
Feb. 22	No. 23 Nebraska		M. L. Tigue Moore Field at Russo Park • Lafayette, LA	**W** 4–1	**McGehee** (1–1)	Horn (0–1)	**Theut** (1)	ESPN+	4,131	3–3	
Feb. 22	No. 23 Nebraska		M. L. Tigue Moore Field at Russo Park • Lafayette, LA	**W** 10–2	**Herrmann** (1–0)	Walsh (1–1)	None	ESPN+	4,131	4–3	
Feb. 25	at McNeese		Joe Miller Ballpark • Lake Charles, LA	**L** 0–3	Mott (1–0)	**Tollett** (1–1)	Lopez (1)	ESPN+	1,383	4–4	
Feb. 26	Southeastern Louisiana		M. L. Tigue Moore Field at Russo Park • Lafayette, LA	**W** 9–7	**Hess** (1–1)	Barbier (1–1)	None	ESPN+	3,949	5–4	
Feb. 28	at UC Irvine		Cicerone Field at Anteater Ballpark • Irvine, CA	**L** 4–7	Ojeda (2–0)	**Holzhammer** (0–1)	Martin (1)	ESPN+	742	5–5	

March (9–10)
Date	Opponent	Rank	Site/stadium	Score	Win	Loss	Save	TV	Attendance	Overall record	SBC record
Mar. 1	at UC Irvine		Cicerone Field at Anteater Ballpark • Irvine, CA	**L** 6–9	Ross (2–1)	**McGehee** (1–2)	Martin (2)	ESPN+	650	5–6	
Mar. 2	at UC Irvine		Cicerone Field at Anteater Ballpark • Irvine, CA	**L** 5–12	Hansen (1–0)	**Herrmann** (1–1)	None	ESPN+	792	5–7	
Mar. 5	UNC Wilmington		M. L. Tigue Moore Field at Russo Park • Lafayette, LA	**W** 6–5	**Mandino** (1–0)	Lawson (0–1)	**Marcotte** (1)	ESPN+	3,372	6–7	
Mar. 7	No. 21 Dallas Baptist		M. L. Tigue Moore Field at Russo Park • Lafayette, LA	**W** 6–5	**Rosario** (1–0)	Bonn (1–2)	None	ESPN+	4,513	7–7	
Mar. 8	No. 21 Dallas Baptist		M. L. Tigue Moore Field at Russo Park • Lafayette, LA	**L** 6–10	Jenkins (2–0)	**Dillhoff** (0–1)	Branson (1)	ESPN+	4,110	7–8	
Mar. 9	No. 21 Dallas Baptist		M. L. Tigue Moore Field at Russo Park • Lafayette, LA	**L** 2–8	Schwede (4–0)	**Hess** (1–2)	None	ESPN+	3,218	7–9	
Mar. 11	Southern		M. L. Tigue Moore Field at Russo Park • Lafayette, LA	**W** 7–5	**Herrmann** (2–1)	Huff (1–1)	None	ESPN+	2,293	8–9	
Mar. 12	McNeese		M. L. Tigue Moore Field at Russo Park • Lafayette, LA	**L** 2–4	Golden (1–1)	**McGehee** (1–3)	Corcoran (1)	ESPN+	3,011	8–10	
Mar. 14	No. 21 Troy		M. L. Tigue Moore Field at Russo Park • Lafayette, LA	**L** 3–4	Gainous (3–0)	**Holzhammer** (0–2)	Dill (1)	ESPN+	4,128	8–11	0–1
Mar. 15	No. 21 Troy		M. L. Tigue Moore Field at Russo Park • Lafayette, LA	**L** 5–8	Stewart (2–1)	**Tollett** (1–2)	Dill (2)	ESPN+	4,160	8–12	0–2
Mar. 16	No. 21 Troy		M. L. Tigue Moore Field at Russo Park • Lafayette, LA	**W** 18–14	**McGehee** (2–3)	Falinski (0–3)	**Osteen** (1)	ESPN+	4,152	9–12	1–2
Mar. 19	at Southeastern Louisiana		Pat Kenelly Diamond at Alumni Field • Hammond, LA	**L** 1–7	Lirette (1–1)	**Grab** (0–1)	None	ESPN+	1,622	9–13	
Mar. 21	at South Alabama		Eddie Stanky Field • Mobile, AL	**W** 7–1	**Morgan** (2–1)	Willingham (2–3)	**Herrmann** (1)	ESPN+	2,134	10–13	2–2
Mar. 22	at South Alabama		Eddie Stanky Field • Mobile, AL	**L** 1–8	Heer (2–0)	**Holzhammer** (0–3)	Shineflew (1)	ESPN+	1,212	10–14	2–3
Mar. 23	at South Alabama		Eddie Stanky Field • Mobile, AL	**W** 9–3	**Tollett** (2–2)	Davis (1–2)	**Hess** (1)	ESPN+	1,308	11–14	3–3
Mar. 25	at No. 8 LSU		Alex Box Stadium, Skip Bertman Field • Baton Rouge, LA	**L** 4–17^{(7 inns.)}	Noot (2–0)	**Herrmann** (2–2)	None	SECN+	11,511	11–15	
Mar. 28	James Madison		M. L. Tigue Moore Field at Russo Park • Lafayette, LA	**W** 5–2	**Hess** (2–2)	Kuhle (1–3)	None	ESPN+	3,267	12–15	4–3
Mar. 29	James Madison		M. L. Tigue Moore Field at Russo Park • Lafayette, LA	**W** 8–7	**McGehee** (3–3)	Smith (1–2)	**Taylor** (1)	ESPN+	2,823	13–15	5–3
Mar. 30	James Madison		M. L. Tigue Moore Field at Russo Park • Lafayette, LA	**W** 3–0	**Tollett** (3–2)	Barroqueiro (0–2)	None	ESPN+	3,103	14–15	6–3

April (8–9)
Date	Opponent	Rank	Site/stadium	Score	Win	Loss	Save	TV	Attendance	Overall record	SBC record
Apr. 1	Northwestern State		M. L. Tigue Moore Field at Russo Park • Lafayette, LA	**W** 9–7	**Hess** (3–2)	Robinson (5–1)	**Taylor** (2)	ESPN+	2,569	15–15	
Apr. 2	Louisiana Tech		M. L. Tigue Moore Field at Russo Park • Lafayette, LA	**L** 6–16	Nichols (3–3)	**Gaither** (0–1)	None	ESPN+	2,947	15–16	
Apr. 4	Texas State		M. L. Tigue Moore Field at Russo Park • Lafayette, LA	**W** 2–0	**Holzhammer** (1–3)	Valentin (4–2)	None	ESPN+	4,022	16–16	7–3
Apr. 5	Texas State		M. L. Tigue Moore Field at Russo Park • Lafayette, LA	**L** 0–2	Tavar (1–2)	**Herrmann** (2–3)	None	ESPN+	3,906	16–17	7–4
Apr. 6	Texas State		M. L. Tigue Moore Field at Russo Park • Lafayette, LA	**L** 3–4	Laws (2–0)	**Holzhammer** (1–4)	None	ESPN+	3,206	16–18	7–5
Apr. 8	UT Rio Grande Valley		M. L. Tigue Moore Field at Russo Park • Lafayette, LA	**L** 7–9	Tejada (2–0)	**Taylor** (0–1)	Oliva (1)	ESPN+	3,803	16–19	
Apr. 9	at Louisiana Tech		J. C. Love Field at Pat Patterson Park • Ruston, LA	**L** 7–10	Fontenot (1–0)	**Osteen** (1–0)	None	ESPN+	1,743	16–20	
Apr. 11	at Louisiana–Monroe		Lou St. Amant Field • Monroe, LA	**W** 9–3	**Morgan** (3–1)	Cirelli (1–7)	**Holzhammer** (2)	ESPN+	1,319	17–20	8–5
Apr. 12	at Louisiana–Monroe		Lou St. Amant Field • Monroe, LA	**L** 3–4^{(10 inns.)}	Gregoire (2–1)	**McGehee** (3–4)	None	ESPN+	1,641	17–21	8–6
Apr. 13	at Louisiana–Monroe		Lou St. Amant Field • Monroe, LA	**L** 2–3	Shaw (3–0)	**Tollett** (3–3)	None	ESPN+	1,283	17–22	8–7
Apr. 17	at Old Dominion		Harbor Park • Norfolk, VA	**W** 6–5^{(10 inns.)}	**Hess** (4–2)	Davis (0–3)	**Holzhammer** (3)	ESPN+	356	18–22	9–7
Apr. 18	at Old Dominion		Harbor Park • Norfolk, VA	**L** 5–6	Hunt (3–0)	**Theut** (0–1)	None	ESPN+	572	18–23	9–8
Apr. 19	at Old Dominion		Harbor Park • Norfolk, VA	**W** 10–0^{(8 inns.)}	**Tollett** (4–3)	Morgan (3–3)	None	ESPN+	641	19–23	10–8
Apr. 22	Grambling State		M. L. Tigue Moore Field at Russo Park • Lafayette, LA	Game Canceled – Rain/Lightning							
Apr. 23	Nicholls		M. L. Tigue Moore Field at Russo Park • Lafayette, LA	**W** 6–2	**Theut** (1–1)	Van't Klooster (0–5)	None	ESPN+	2,814	20–23	
Apr. 25	Georgia Southern		M. L. Tigue Moore Field at Russo Park • Lafayette, LA	**W** 4–1	**Morgan** (4–1)	Pendley (3–1)	**Herrmann** (2)	ESPN+	4,141	21–23	11–8
Apr. 26	Georgia Southern		M. L. Tigue Moore Field at Russo Park • Lafayette, LA	**W** 7–3	**Hess** (5–2)	Grundy (5–5)	**Holzhammer** (4)	ESPN+	4,152	22–23	12–8
Apr. 27	Georgia Southern		M. L. Tigue Moore Field at Russo Park • Lafayette, LA	**L** 3–4	Degondea (4–0)	**Tollett** (4–4)	None	ESPN+	3,274	22–24	12–9

May (4–5)
Date	Opponent	Rank	Site/stadium	Score	Win	Loss	Save	TV	Attendance	Overall record	SBC record
May 2	at Georgia State		Georgia State Baseball Complex • Decatur, GA	**W** 10–5	**Hess** (6–2)	White (5–5)	None	ESPN+	302	23–24	13–9
May 3	at Georgia State		Georgia State Baseball Complex • Decatur, GA	**W** 8–3	**Herrmann** (3–3)	Hembree (1–2)	None	ESPN+	280	24–24	14–9
May 4	at Georgia State		Georgia State Baseball Complex • Decatur, GA	**W** 10–4	**Tollett** (5–4)	Norman (4–7)	None	ESPN+	312	25–24	15–9
May 9	at No. 21 Southern Miss		Pete Taylor Park/Hill Denson Field • Hattiesburg, MS	**L** 3–11	Middleton (9–1)	**Herrmann** (3–4)	None	ESPN+	5,351	25–25	15–10
May 10	at No. 21 Southern Miss		Pete Taylor Park/Hill Denson Field • Hattiesburg, MS	**L** 5–15^{(7 inns.)}	Adams (5–2)	**Morgan** (4–2)	Allen (1)	ESPN+	5,431	25–26	15–11
May 11	at No. 21 Southern Miss		Pete Taylor Park/Hill Denson Field • Hattiesburg, MS	**L** 6–9	Sivley (5–1)	**Theut** (1–2)	Payne (1)	ESPN+	5,306	25–27	15–12
May 15	Arkansas State		M. L. Tigue Moore Field at Russo Park • Lafayette, LA	**L** 0–3	Galy (3–1)	**Morgan** (4–3)	Richter (1)	ESPN+	3,274	25–28	15–13
May 16	Arkansas State		M. L. Tigue Moore Field at Russo Park • Lafayette, LA	**L** 3–13^{(7 inns.)}	Garrison (3–2)	**McGehee** (3–5)	None	ESPN+	3,825	25–29	15–14
May 17	Arkansas State		M. L. Tigue Moore Field at Russo Park • Lafayette, LA	**W** 8–6	**Holzhammer** (2–4)	Richter (3–4)	**Theut** (2)	ESPN+	3,729	26–29	16–14

Postseason (1–2)

SBC Tournament (1–2)
Date	Opponent	(Seed)/Rank	Site/stadium	Score	Win	Loss	Save	TV	Attendance	Overall record	Tournament record
May 21	vs. (4) Marshall	(5)	Montgomery Riverwalk Stadium • Montgomery, AL	**L** 5–9	Blevins (6–5)	**Hess** (6–3)	Weyrich (1)	ESPN+	603	26–30	0–1
May 22	(9) Georgia Southern	(5)	Montgomery Riverwalk Stadium • Montgomery, AL	**W** 5–4	**Tollett** (6–4)	Mackowiak (0–1)	None	ESPN+	604	27–30	1–1
May 23	vs. (4) Marshall	(5)	Montgomery Riverwalk Stadium • Montgomery, AL	**L** 13–17	Moak (3–2)	**Herrmann** (3–5)	Weyrich (2)	ESPN+	751	27–31	1–2

Schedule source:

*Rankings are based on the team's current ranking in the D1Baseball poll.
