= Skylar Meade =

American baseball coach (born 1984)

Current position
- Title: Head coach
- Team: Troy
- Conference: Sun Belt
- Record: 187–121 (.607)

Biographical details
- Born: September 10, 1984 (age 41); Louisville, Kentucky, U.S.

Playing career
- 2003–2007: Louisville
- Position: Pitcher

Coaching career (HC unless noted)
- 2008: Eastern Illinois (GA)
- 2009–2012: Eastern Illinois (pitching)
- 2013–2014: Middle Tennessee (pitching)
- 2015–2017: Michigan State (pitching)
- 2018–2021: South Carolina (pitching)
- 2022–present: Troy

Head coaching record
- Overall: 187–121 (.607)

Accomplishments and honors

Championships
- NCAA Regional (2026); CWS appearance (2026)

Skylar Meade (born September 10, 1984) is an American baseball coach who is the head baseball coach at Troy University.

== Head coaching record ==
Record table
Season	Team	Overall	Conference	Standing	Postseason
Troy Trojans (Sun Belt Conference) (2022–present)
2022	Troy	32–24	15–15	6th	
2023	Troy	40–22	18–12	T–3rd	NCAA regional
2024	Troy	37–22	18–12	3rd (West)	
2025	Troy	39–21	18–12	3rd	
2026	Troy	39–32	17–13	T–3rd	College World Series
Troy:		187–121 (.607)	86–64 (.573)		
Total:		187–121 (.607)			
National champion Postseason invitational champion Conference regular season champion Conference regular season and conference tournament champion Division regular season champion Division regular season and conference tournament champion Conference tournament champion
