= Chad Oxendine =

American baseball coach (born 1981)

Current position
- Title: Associate Head coach
- Team: South Carolina
- Conference: SEC

Biographical details
- Born: June 10, 1981 (age 45); Lumberton, North Carolina

Playing career
- 2001–2004: Coastal Carolina
- Position: Catcher

Coaching career (HC unless noted)
- 2006: UNC Wilmington (V)
- 2007: Alabama (V)
- 2008–2010: Richmond (Asst.)
- 2011: Myrtle Beach Pelicans (H)
- 2012: Coastal Carolina (V)
- 2015–2017: Longwood (Asst.)
- 2022–2024: Longwood
- 2025–2026: Coastal Carolina (AHC)
- 2027–present: South Carolina (AHC)

Administrative career (AD unless noted)
- 2018–2020: Coastal Carolina (DBO)
- 2021: Coastal Carolina (DPD)

Head coaching record
- Overall: 66–93 (.415)

Accomplishments and honors

Awards
- Second-team All-Big South (2004)

Chad Oxendine (born June 10, 1981) is an American baseball coach and former catcher who is the currently the associate head baseball coach of the Coastal Carolina Chanticleers. He previously was the head coach of the Longwood Lancers. He played college baseball at Coastal Carolina for head coach Gary Gilmore from 2001 to 2004.

== Playing career ==
Oxendine was a catcher at Coastal Carolina from 2001 to 2004, where he was a co-captain his junior and senior seasons, as well as a second-team All-Big South Conference player as a senior. He signed with the Chicago White Sox after college, spending one season with the Bristol White Sox of the Appalachian League before turning to coaching.

== Coaching career ==
Oxendine began his coaching career as a volunteer assistant at UNC Wilmington and later Alabama. He was named a full-time assistant at Richmond in July 2007 and spent three seasons with the program before joining the Myrtle Beach Pelicans, a single-A baseball team that was a part of the Texas Rangers system at the time, as their hitting coach in 2011. He spent one season at his alma mater Coastal Carolina as a volunteer assistant, and did not coach college baseball until he was named an assistant coach at Longwood in 2015.

Oxendine returned to Coastal Carolina in 2017 to serve as the program's director of baseball operations. He was promoted to director of player development in 2020, also adding operations and data analytics duties.

Oxendine was named head coach at Longwood on June 28, 2021.

Oxendine returned home to his alma mater (Coastal Carolina) on June 11, 2024 to be the Associate Head Coach and Recruiting Coordinator under new Head Coach Kevin Schnall

After spending two seasons at Coastal Carolina, Oxendine joined Kevin Schnall’s staff at South Carolina as Associate Head Coach following Schnall’s hiring as head baseball coach.

== Head coaching record ==
Record table
Season	Team	Overall	Conference	Standing	Postseason
Longwood Lancers (Big South Conference) (2022–2024)
2022	Longwood	20–33	10–14	8th	
2023	Longwood	23–31	11–16	9th	
2024	Longwood	23–29	10–14	T–5th	
Longwood:		66–93 (.415)	31–44 (.413)		
Total:		66–93 (.415)			
National champion Postseason invitational champion Conference regular season champion Conference regular season and conference tournament champion Division regular season champion Division regular season and conference tournament champion Conference tournament champion
