= Kevin Schnall =

American baseball coach (born 1977)

Current position
- Title: Head coach
- Team: South Carolina
- Conference: SEC
- Record: 0–0

Biographical details
- Born: January 30, 1977 (age 49); Easton, Pennsylvania, U.S.

Playing career
- 1995–1999: Coastal Carolina
- Position: Catcher

Coaching career (HC unless noted)
- 2001–2012: Coastal Carolina (assistant)
- 2013–2015: UCF (assistant)
- 2016–2024: Coastal Carolina (associate head coach)
- 2024–2026: Coastal Carolina
- 2027–present: South Carolina

Head coaching record
- Overall: 93–36
- Tournaments: Sun Belt: 5–2; NCAA: 8–4

Accomplishments and honors

Championships
- 2016 College World Series; CWS Appearance (2025); Sun Belt regular season (2025); Sun Belt Tournament (2025)

Awards
- Big South Conference Player of the Year(1999); NCBWA 2nd Team All-American (1999); Sun Belt Coach of the Year (2025); Perfect Game Coach of the Year (2025); Baseball America's College Coach of the Year (2025); ABCA/ATEC Atlantic Region Coach of the Year (2025)

Kevin Schnall (born January 30, 1977) is an American college baseball coach who is currently the head baseball coach at the University of South Carolina.

== Playing career ==
Schnall played catcher for the Coastal Carolina Chanticleers from 1998 to 1999. He was the first player in program history to earn All-American honors as he made 2nd Team All-American from the NCBWA in 1999. He was drafted in the 25th round of the 1999 MLB draft by the Cincinnati Reds. He would play two seasons in Cincinnati's farm system, appearing for the rookie-level Gulf Coast League Reds, rookie-level Billings Mustangs, and Single-A Dayton Dragons.

== Coaching career ==
Schnall began his college coaching career in 2001 under Gary Gilmore following his professional baseball career and served as an assistant coach at Coastal Carolina until 2012, when he left to become an assistant coach and recruiting coordinator for UCF. Coach Schnall returned to Coastal Carolina in 2016 and served as the assistant head coach. That season, Coastal Carolina won the national championship. On June 10, 2024, Schnall was officially named Head Coach of Coastal Carolina. He became the sixth head coach in school history. He replaced Coastal's long time and winningest coach Gary Gilmore, who served as Head Coach of the Chanticleers for 29 seasons. Coach Schnall was awarded the Sun Belt's Ron Maestri Coach of the Year award in his first season as the Head Coach of Coastal Carolina, guiding the Chants to a 44-win regular season, winning the conference's regular season champion. Coach Schnall led the Chanticleers to the College World Series in his first season. After going 37-23 in his second season at Coastal Carolina, Schnall was named the head baseball coach at the University of South Carolina.

== Head coaching record ==
Record table
Season	Team	Overall	Conference	Standing	Postseason
Coastal Carolina (Sun Belt Conference) (2025–2026)
2025	Coastal Carolina	56–13	26–4	1st	College World Series Runner-up
2026	Coastal Carolina	37–23	21–9	2nd	NCAA Regional
Coastal Carolina:		93–36 (.721)	47–13 (.783)		
South Carolina (Southeastern Conference) (2027–present)
2027	South Carolina	0–0	0–0		
South Carolina:		0–0 (–)	0–0 (–)		
Total:		93–36 (.721)			
National champion Postseason invitational champion Conference regular season champion Conference regular season and conference tournament champion Division regular season champion Division regular season and conference tournament champion Conference tournament champion
