= Cameron Flukey =

American baseball player (born 2005)

Detroit Tigers
- Pitcher
- Born: April 13, 2005 (age 21); Galloway Township, New Jersey, U.S.
- Bats: Right Throws: Right
- Stats at Baseball Reference

Cameron Vincent Flukey (born April 13, 2005) is an American professional baseball pitcher in the Detroit Tigers organization.

== Amateur career ==
Flukey attended Egg Harbor Township High School in Egg Harbor Township, New Jersey, where he played baseball. As a junior in 2022, he pitched to a 5–2 record, a 3.10 ERA, and 63 strikeouts. In 2023, his senior season, he posted a 6–2 record, a 0.45 ERA, and 83 strikeouts. He also hit .253 with 15 RBI. Flukey was considered a top high school prospect for 2023 Major League Baseball draft and was invited and attended the 2023 MLB Draft Combine. However, he went unselected in the draft and thus enrolled at Coastal Carolina University to play college baseball for the Chanticleers.

As a freshman for Coastal Carolina in 2024, Flukey appeared in 19 games (making ten starts) and went 3–3 with a 5.73 ERA and 83 strikeouts over 55 innings. As a sophomore, he moved into the team's starting rotation full-time, helping lead them to the 2025 Men's College World Series. Flukey made 18 appearances (17 starts) and pitched to an 8–2 record, a 3.19 ERA, and 118 strikeouts over 101 2/3 innings. Across four postseason appearances, he posted a 3.27 ERA and 25 strikeouts over 22 innings. Flukey opened the 2026 season considered a top prospect for the upcoming MLB draft. After making his season debut, he was scratched from his next scheduled start before it was announced he would be sidelined with a stress reaction in his rib cage. He missed close to two months before returning to play in late April. For the 2026 season, Flukey made a total of seven starts in which he had a 0–2 record, a 4.13 ERA, and 31 strikeouts across 24 innings pitched. After the season, he entered the transfer portal.

== Professional career ==
Flukey was selected by the Detroit Tigers in the first round with the 22nd overall pick of the 2026 Major League Baseball draft. He signed with the Tigers on July 15 for $3.8 million.

Flukey made his professional debut after signing with the Single-A Lakeland Flying Tigers. He made four starts for Lakeland and gave up no runs with 14 strikeouts and seven walks across 10 1/3 innings.
