= Dabos Park =

Baseball park in Alabama, US

DABOS Park
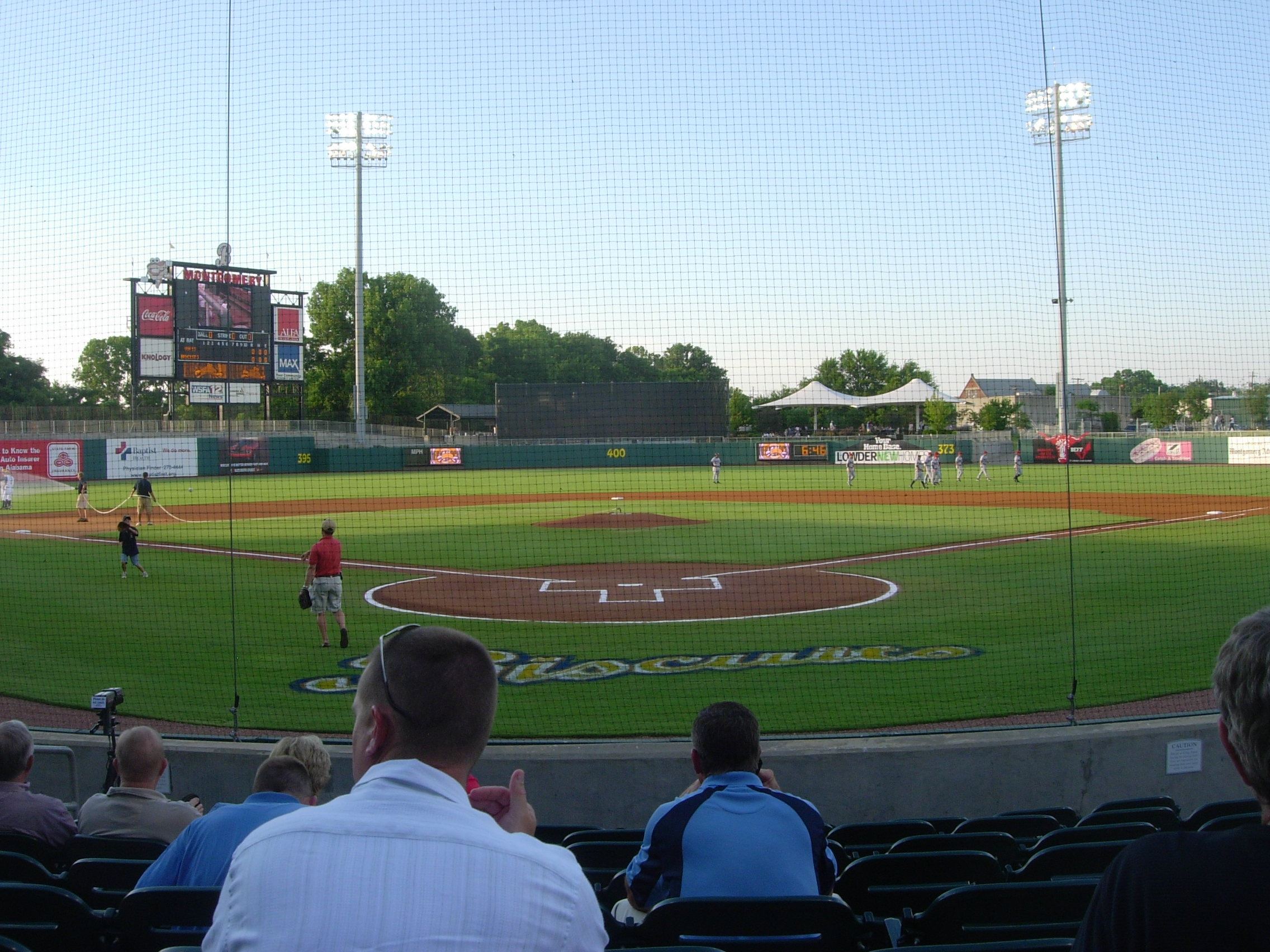

- Location within Alabama Location within the United States
- Former names: Montgomery Riverwalk Stadium (2004–2026)
- Location: 200 Coosa Street; Montgomery, Alabama 36104
- Coordinates: 32.3822°N 86.3106°W
- Owner: City of Montgomery
- Operator: Montgomery Professional Baseball, LLC
- Capacity: 4,500 seats 20 luxury boxes ~2,500 general admission (7,000 total)
- Surface: Grass
- Field size: Left Field: 314 ft (96 m); Left-Center: 380 ft (120 m); Center Field: 401 ft (122 m); Right-center: 377 ft (115 m); Right Field: 332 ft (101 m)

Construction
- Groundbreaking: May 11, 2003
- Opened: April 16, 2004
- Cost: $26 million ($44.3 million in 2025 dollars)
- Architect: Populous
- Project manager: Hagan Construction Company
- Structural engineers: Walter P Moore/Sykes Consulting, Inc.
- Services engineers: J. M. Garrett & Sons, Inc.
- General contractor: Jesco Inc.

Tenant
- Montgomery Biscuits (SL) (2004–present)

DABOS Park (formerly Montgomery Riverwalk Stadium) is the home of the Montgomery Biscuits of the Southern League. The minor league baseball ballpark opened in Montgomery, Alabama in 2004. Located in downtown Montgomery, the stadium can host up to 7,000 people a night.

DABOS Park is a converted century-old train shed. The actual train station is located two blocks away from the field. The abandoned train shed is what is on the exterior of the first base side of the park. Riverwalk Stadium is located near the Alabama River. Montgomery offers a riverfront area that is easily accessible from Riverwalk Stadium with a children's splash pad. There is also an amphitheater located behind the field.

== Features ==
The stadium offers 20 luxury suites. Six of the suites are built into the old train terminal along the first-base line and the remaining 14 extend along the third base line. DABOS Park offers picnic areas along the third-base line and in left-center field. The picnic area in left-center field can accommodate up to 4,000 fans. The stadium also has a full bar, called "The Club Car Bar", which is located down the first base line and a children's playground area located down the third base line. The stadium scoreboard is a video board with a LED screen capable of instant replay. The stadium also has a team store called "The Biscuit Basket" located under the grandstands. There is a notched curve in deep right field over which the American flag is flown.

Between 2004 and 2007, Riverwalk Stadium hosted the NCAA Division II baseball championship tournament; the tournament moved to Riverwalk Stadium from nearby Paterson Field, where it had been held since 1985. The tournament moved to Sauget, Illinois, in 2008.

== History ==
Victor Mateo threw the stadium's first no-hitter on August 24, 2013, when he allowed just one baserunner on a walk (the runner was erased in a double play later in the inning) in the Biscuits' 3–0 defeat of the Jacksonville Suns.

The ballpark was scheduled to become the permanent home for the Sun Belt Conference baseball tournament in 2020, but as the season was postponed, it began during the 2021 season.

In March 2026, biotech company Dabos bought the naming rights to the stadium.
