= Coastal Carolina Chanticleers baseball statistical leaders =

The Coastal Carolina Chanticleers baseball statistical leaders are individual statistical leaders of the Coastal Carolina Chanticleers baseball program in various categories, including batting average, home runs, runs batted in, runs, hits, stolen bases, ERA, and Strikeouts. Within those areas, the lists identify single-game, single-season, and career leaders. The Chanticleers represent Coastal Carolina University in the NCAA's Sun Belt Conference.

Coastal Carolina began competing in intercollegiate baseball in 1974. These lists are updated through the end of the 2025 season.

== Batting Average ==
Career (Min. 400 at-bats)
Rk	Player	AVG	Seasons
1	Terry Spires	.400	1986 1987
	Kirt Manwaring	.400	198419851986
3	Mickey Brantley	.394	1981 1982 1983
4	Frank Talotta	.390	1982 1983
5	Tommy La Stella	.388	2010 2011
6	Bruce Franklin	.375	1979 1980 1981
7	Greg Streett	.373	1987 1988
8	John Kay	.3710	1985 1986 1987
9	Denny Woods	.3709	1984 1985
10	Greg Brown	.3702	1983 1984

Season (Min. 100 at-bats)
Rk	Player	AVG	Season
1	Steve Billingsly	.441	1978
2	Tony Maggard	.424	1981
3	Denny Woods	.422	1985
4	Justin Owens	.417	2002
5	Chris Carter	.417	2001
6	Mickey Brantley	.415	1983
7	Ricky Grice	.412	1983
8	Kirt Manwaring	.411	1986
9	Dorian Cameron	.411	1998
10	Bruce Franklin	.410	1980

== Home Runs ==
Career
Rk	Player	HR	Seasons
1	David Anderson	50	2006 2007 2008 2009
2	Tom Romano	48	1977 1978 1979 1980
3	Daniel Bowman	46	2009 2010 2011 2012
4	Mike Costanzo	45	2003 2004 2005
5	Zack Beach	40	2020 2021 2022 2023 2024
	Kevin Woodall Jr.	40	2015 2016 2017 2018
	Blake Barthol	40	2023 2024 2025 2026
8	Graham Brown	36	2022 2023 2024
9	Seth Lancaster	34	2015 2016 2017 2018
10	David Sappelt	33	2006 2007 2008
	John Rigos	33	1981 1982 1983

Season
Rk	Player	HR	Season
1	John Rigos	22	1983
2	David Anderson	21	2009
	Mike Costanzo	21	2004
4	Seth Lancaster	20	2018
	David Anderson	20	2008
6	Derek Bender	19	2023
	Tyler Johnson	19	2022
	Kevin Woodall Jr.	19	2018
	Zach Remillard	19	2016
	Kirt Manwaring	19	1986
	Mickey Brantley	19	1983

== Runs Batted In ==
Career
Rk	Player	RBI	Seasons
1	Daniel Bowman	206	2009 2010 2011 2012
2	Brandon Powell	186	2000 2001 2002 2003
3	David Anderson	184	2006 2007 2008 2009
	Mike Costanzo	184	2003 2004 2005
	Blake Barthol	184	2023 2024 2025 2026
6	Graham Brown	176	2022 2023 2024
7	Zach Remillard	168	2013 2014 2015 2016
8	Luis Lopez	167	1991 1992 1993 1994
9	Caden Bodine	160	2023 2023 2025
10	Rich Witten	158	2008 2009 2010 2011 2012

Season
Rk	Player	RBI	Season
1	Derek Bender	83	2023
2	Zach Biermann	82	2019
	David Anderson	82	2009
4	Jose Iglesias	80	2010
5	Mike Costanzo	74	2004
6	Zach Remillard	72	2016
	G.K. Young	72	2016
	Dock Doyle	72	2008
	Michael DeJesus	72	2005
10	Graham Brown	71	2023

== Runs ==
Career
Rk	Player	R	Seasons
1	Scott Woodward	251	2008 2009 2010 2011
2	Ryan McGraw	232	2001 2002 2003 2004
3	Daniel Bowman	215	2009 2010 2011 2012
4	Blake Barthol	209	2023 2024 2025 2026
5	Rico Noel	187	2008 2009 2010
6	Nick Lucky	186	2019 2020 2021 2022 2023
7	Brandon Powell	179	2000 2001 2002 2003
8	Seth Lancaster	175	2015 2016 2017 2018
	Justin Owens	175	1999 2000 2001 2002
10	Mike Costanzo	171	2003 2004 2005

Season
Rk	Player	R	Season
1	Rico Noel	82	2010
	Scott Woodward	82	2008
3	Seth Lancaster	81	2018
4	Scott Woodward	75	2010
	Rico Noel	75	2009
6	Mike Costanzo	74	2005
7	Kirt Manwaring	73	1986
8	Ryan McGraw	72	2002
9	Kevin Woodall Jr.	71	2018
	Graham Brown	71	2023

== Hits ==
Career
Rk	Player	H	Seasons
1	Daniel Bowman	309	2009 2010 2011 2012
2	Brandon Powell	303	2000 2001 2002 2003
3	Ryan McGraw	283	2001 2002 2003 2004
4	Luis Lopez	264	1991 1992 1993 1994
5	Blake Barthol	256	2023 2024 2025 2026
6	Scott Woodward	254	2008 2009 2010 2011
7	Zach Remillard	251	2013 2014 2015 2016
	David Sappelt	251	2006 2007 2008
9	Justin Owens	249	1999 2000 2001 2002
	Robbie Jordan	249	1987 1988 1989 1990

Season
Rk	Player	H	Season
1	G.K. Young	99	2016
	Zach Remillard	99	2016
	David Sappelt	99	2007
4	Dorian Cameron	97	1998
5	David Sappelt	96	2008
6	Daniel Bowman	95	2012
7	Tommy La Stella	93	2010
8	Tommy La Stella	92	2011
	Tommy Baldridge	92	2007
	Brandon Powell	92	2003

== Stolen Bases ==
Career
Rk	Player	SB	Seasons
1	Ryan McGraw	160	2001 2002 2003 2004
2	Scott Woodward	158	2008 2009 2010 2011
3	Rico Noel	120	2008 2009 2010
4	Stephen Turner	99	1992 1993 1994 1995
5	Steve Billingsly	86	1977 1978
6	Justin Owens	84	1999 2000 2001 2002
7	Ricky Grice	82	1979 1980 1981 1982 1983
8	Brandon Powell	80	2000 2001 2002 2003
9	Gary Gilmore	77	1979 1980
10	Jon Humay	72	1999 2000 2001

Season
Rk	Player	SB	Season
1	Ryan McGraw	63	2002
2	Rico Noel	56	2010
3	Scott Woodward	55	2010
4	Rico Noel	48	2009
5	Steve Billingsly	47	1978
6	Ryan McGraw	45	2003
	Mark Romer	45	1990
8	Scott Woodward	42	2008
9	Ricky Grice	37	1983
10	Stephen Turner	35	1995

== Earned Run Average ==
Career (Min. 100 IP)
Rk	Player	ERA	Seasons
1	Steve Smith	1.71	1978 1979 1980
2	Ryan Connolly	2.23	2010 2011 2012 2013
3	Anthony Meo	2.52	2009 2010 2011
4	Joey Haug	2.54	2007 2008
5	Paul Alexander	2.55	1990
6	Ben Smith	2.57	2012 2013 2014
	Aaron Burke	2.57	2011 2012 2013
8	Mark Clemons	2.61	1981 1982 1983
9	Josh Conway	2.68	2010 2011 2012
10	Ken Tomko	2.69	1980 1981 1982 1983

Season (Min. 40 IP)
Rk	Player	ERA	Season
1	Marc Goldberg	0.89	1980
2	Brent Byer	0.97	1977
3	Dave Iorlano	1.27	1991
4	Andrew Beckwith	1.33	2014
5	Jordan Coons	1.38	2001
6	Steve Smith	1.48	1979
7	Mike Morrison	1.50	2016
8	Matt Logue	1.55	1989
9	Aaron Burke	1.58	2012
10	Steve Smith	1.71	1980

== Strikeouts ==
Career
Rk	Player	K	Seasons
1	Scott Sturkie	400	1998 1999 2000 2001
2	Steven Carter	389	2001 2002 2003 2004
3	Randy Stokes	305	1987 1988 1989 1990
4	Rett Johnson	302	1998 1999 2000
5	Alex Cunningham	295	2013 2015 2016 2017
6	Justin Sturge	278	2000 2001 2002 2003
7	Anthony Meo	277	2009 2010 2011
8	Cody Wheeler	276	2008 2009 2010
9	Byron Binda	274	2002 2003 2004 2005
10	Ron Deubel	268	1998 1999

Season
Rk	Player	K	Season
1	Rett Johnson	151	2000
2	Ron Deubel	136	1998
3	Scott Sturkie	133	2001
4	Ron Deubel	132	1999
5	Alex Cunningham	117	2017
6	Steven Carter	116	2004
7	Anthony Meo	115	2011
8	Cody Wheeler	113	2010
9	Steven Carter	110	2003
10	Scott Sturkie	106	1999
