= St. Anthony-on-Hudson Seminary =

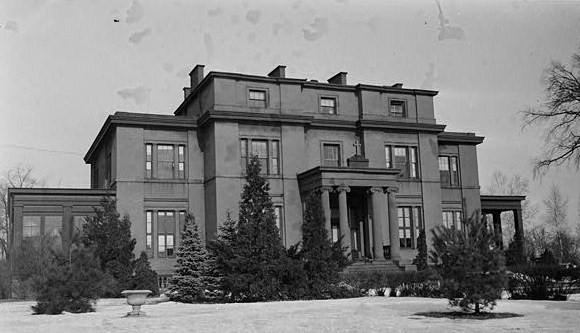
- Type: Seminary
- Active: 1912–1988
- Affiliations: Catholic Church (Order of Friars Minor Conventual)
- Location: Rensselaer, New York, United States

St. Anthony-on-Hudson Seminary was a Roman Catholic seminary in Rensselaer, New York. Established in 1912, it was run by the Order of Friars Minor Conventual and closed in 1988.

The facility was housed in the historic Beverwyck Manor.

== Notable alumni ==
- Cardinal Peter Turkson, Archbishop of Cape Coast
- Gregory John Hartmayer, O.F.M. Conv., Archbishop of Atlanta
- Elias James Manning, O.F.M. Conv., Bishop of Valença from 1990 to 2014
- Martin de Porres Ward, O.F.M. Conv., African-American Conventual friar and missionary to Brazil, candidate for canonization

== See also ==
- List of defunct colleges and universities in New York
