= La Salle Institute =

- 174 Williams Road; Troy, New York 12180; United States

Information
- Type: Private, Catholic College-prep education institution
- Motto: Latin: Signum Fidei; English: Sign of Faith
- Religious affiliations: Roman Catholic (De La Salle Christian Brothers)
- Patron saint: Jean-Baptiste de La Salle
- Established: 1850; 176 years ago
- Founder: Institute of the Brothers of the Christian Schools
- President: Kevin T. Calacone ’99
- Chairperson: Dave Brennan ’87
- Principal: Kevin Leyden
- Faculty: 30
- Teaching staff: 38.0 (on an FTE basis)
- Grades: 6-12 Adding Fifth Grade for the 26-27 School Year
- Gender: Co-Educational
- Enrollment: 532 (2023-24)
- Student to teacher ratio: 14.0
- Colors: Blue and White
- Athletics: 16 varsity sports teams
- Athletics conference: NYSPHSAA Section 2 – Colonial Council
Sports
Baseball Basketball Football; Hockey Lacrosse Soccer	Bowling; Cross country Swimming Tennis; Track and field Wrestling
- Team name: Cadets
- Accreditation: Middle States Association of Colleges and Schools
- Newspaper: Cadet Gazette
Tuition
$10,290 (Gr.6) $11,420 (Gr.7) $11,450 (Gr.8) $13,350 (Gr.9)	$13,350 (Gr.10) $13,350 (Gr.11) $13,390 (Gr.12)
- Website: www.lasalleinstitute.org
- Last updated: October 14th, 2020

La Salle Institute is an independent, private, Catholic college preparatory school run by the Institute of the Brothers of the Christian Schools in Troy, New York, United States serving boys and girls in grades five through twelve. It was established by the De La Salle Brothers in 1850 and located within but operates independently of the Diocese of Albany.

== History ==
La Salle Institute was founded in 1850 and was originally located in downtown Troy. The school was first charted by the New York State Board of Regents in 1891. In the 1960s a modern facility was constructed on Williams Road near the boundary between the city of Troy and the town of North Greenbush. The new campus opened in January 1966. Grades 7 and 8 were added in 1971, Grade 6 was added in 1991, and Grade 5 was added in 2026. A substantial renovation and expansion was completed in 1990, 1999 and 2001.

In September 2021, La Salle Institute became a co-educational institution after 171 years of educating all-boys. As of the 2021-22 school year, La Salle Institute educated 428 students including 65 girls and 363 boys.

== Historical Enrollment ==
La Salle Institute Enrollment
School Year	Boys' Enrollment	Girls' Enrollment	Total Enrollment
2000	642	0	642
2002	658	0	658
2004	625	0	625
2006	536	0	536
2008	445	0	445
2010	410	0	410
2012	409	0	409
2014	405	0	405
2016	372	0	372
2018	364	0	364
2020	372	0	372
2021	363	65	428

== Notable alumni ==
The following is an incomplete list of notable La Salle Institute alumni:

- Dr. Edward Countryman (1962): (July 31, 1944 – March 24, 2025) was an American historian known for his study of the American Revolution. He taught at Yale University, University of Canterbury, and Southern Methodist University.
- Jose Ferrer (1927): Oscar for Best Actor in 1950 for his role in Cyrano de Bergerac
- Jeff Robinson (Siena basketball) (1986): former basketball player known for his career at Siena College, where in 1988–89 he was named the North Atlantic Conference Player of the Year. Member of the Siena Hall of Fame. Top ten all-time scoring list at Siena with 1,657 pts.
- Bishop Howard J. Hubbard (1956): Bishop of the Roman Catholic Diocese of Albany from 1977 to 2014.
- Butch Byrd (1960): American football player for the Buffalo Bills and Denver Broncos. Two time AFL champion.
- Guy Hebert: Hockey goalie, played for 10 years in the National Hockey League and Team USA, including the 1997 NHL All-Star Game.
- William J. Larkin Jr. (1944): member of the New York State Legislature from 1979 to 2018
- Bishop Elias Manning (1956): Bishop of Valença, Brazil.
- Michael R. McNulty: Member of the United States House of Representatives from 1989 to 2009. Represented the 21st Congressional District of New York.
- Martin E. Sullivan: Director of the National Portrait Gallery of the Smithsonian Institution. Former Director of the New York State Museum.
- Reid Scott: Actor
- Scott Sicko (2005): American football player
- Zach Remillard (2012): baseball player
- Will Remillard: baseball coach
- Stephen R. Lyons (1979): retired U.S. Army General. Served as Port and Supply Chain Envoy in the Biden-Harris Administration's Supply Chain Disruptions Task Force.

== See also ==
- List of Catholic schools in New York
