= 2023 Sun Belt Conference baseball tournament =

- Teams: 10
- Format: Double-elimination
- Finals site: Riverwalk Stadium; Montgomery, Alabama
- Champions: Southern Miss (1 title)
- Winning coach: Scott Berry (1 title)
- MVP: Tanner Hall (Southern Miss)
- Television: ESPN+

2023 Sun Belt Conference baseball standings
	Conf.				Overall
Team	W		L	PCT	W		L	PCT
No. 21 Coastal Carolina ‍†‍‍^{y}	23	–	7	.767	42	–	21	.667
No. 9 Southern Miss ‍‍‡‍^{y}	22	–	8	.733	46	–	20	.697
Troy ‍‍‍^{y}	18	–	12	.600	40	–	22	.645
Louisiana ‍‍‍^{y}	18	–	12	.600	41	–	24	.631
Texas State ‍‍‍	17	–	13	.567	36	–	23	.610
Appalachian State ‍‍‍	16	–	13	.552	30	–	25	.545
James Madison ‍‍‍	15	–	13	.536	31	–	25	.554
Georgia State ‍‍‍	16	–	14	.533	30	–	29	.508
Georgia Southern ‍‍‍	16	–	14	.533	27	–	29	.482
Old Dominion ‍‍‍	15	–	15	.500	32	–	23	.582
South Alabama ‍‍‍	11	–	19	.367	23	–	31	.426
Arkansas State ‍‍‍	9	–	19	.321	20	–	31	.392
Louisiana–Monroe ‍‍‍	6	–	23	.207	17	–	37	.315
Marshall ‍‍‍	5	–	25	.167	16	–	37	.302
† – Conference champion ‡ – Tournament champion y – Invited to the NCAA Tournament; As of June 25, 2023; Rankings from D1Baseball

The 2023 Sun Belt Conference baseball tournament was held at Riverwalk Stadium in Montgomery, Alabama from May 23 to May 28, 2023. The tournament used a double-elimination format. The winner of the tournament earned the Sun Belt Conference's automatic bid to the 2023 NCAA Division I baseball tournament.

== Seeding ==
In a change from previous years, the top ten teams (based on conference results) from the conference earn invites to the tournament. The teams will be seeded based on conference winning percentage, with the bottom four seeds competing in a play-in round. The remaining eight teams will then play a two bracket, double-elimination tournament. The winner of each bracket will play a championship final.

== Results ==
=== Play-in round ===
All games played on Tuesday, May 22 are single elimination. The lowerseeded first round winner will advance to play the No. 1 seed, while the higher-seeded first round winner will face the No. 2 seed.

Tuesday, May 23
Team	R
#10 Old Dominion	1
#7 James Madison	2

Tuesday, May 23
Team	R
#9 Georgia Southern	5
#8 Georgia State	8

== Results ==
First round
1	Coastal Carolina	5
8	Georgia State	4
4	Louisiana	6
5	Texas State	1
5	Texas State	6 (12 Inn.)
8	Georgia State	5
3	Troy	10 (10 Inn.)
6	App State	9
2	Southern Miss	7
7	James Madison	1
6	App State	8
7	James Madison	7

Second round
1	Coastal Carolina	6
4	Louisiana	3
5	Texas State	6
4	Louisiana	12
3	Troy	6
2	Southern Miss	7
6	App State	14
3	Troy	10

Semifinals
1	Coastal Carolina	3	1
4	Louisiana	7	4
2	Southern Miss	2	11 (7 Inn)
6	App State	4	1

Final
4	Louisiana	2
2	Southern Miss	6
