= Roman Catholic Archdiocese of Valencia =

Roman Catholic Archdiocese of Valencia may refer to the following Latin Catholic archbishoprics with sees called Valencia:

- Roman Catholic Archdiocese of Valencia in Spain
- Roman Catholic Archdiocese of Valencia in Venezuela

== See also ==
- Roman Catholic Diocese of Valença, Brazil
- Roman Catholic Diocese of Valence, France
