= Martin de Porres Ward =

African-American Catholic Friar Minor and missionary priest

Servant of God Martin Maria de Porres Ward O.F.M. Conv.
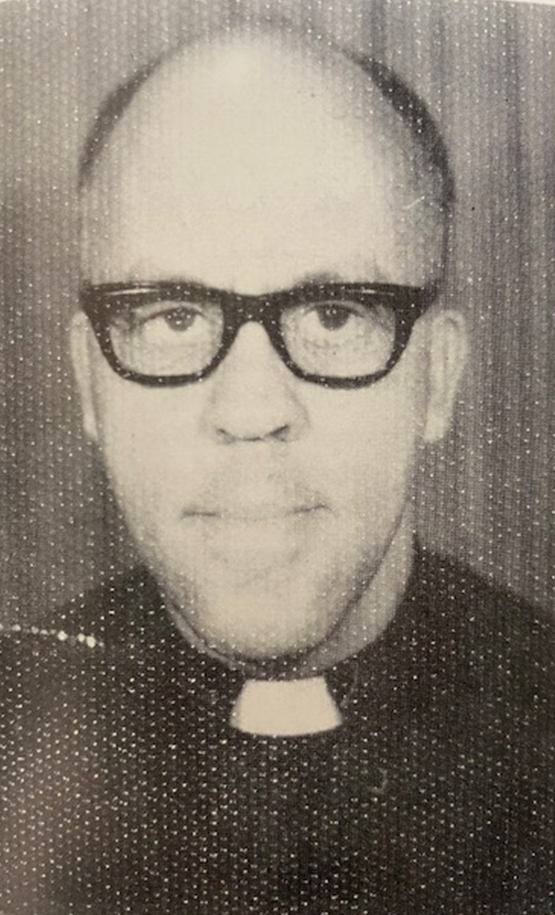

Orders
- Ordination: June 4, 1955 by William Scully

Personal details
- Born: Matthias DeWitte Ward; March 20, 1918 Charlestown, Massachusetts, United States
- Died: June 22, 1999 (aged 81) Rio de Janeiro, Brazil
- Buried: Andrelândia, Minas Gerais, Brazil
- Parents: William Henry Ward & Clara Irby
- Education: St. Anthony-on-Hudson Seminary

Martin Maria de Porres Ward, O.F.M. Conv. (born Matthias DeWitte Ward; March 20, 1918 – June 22, 1999) was an African-American Catholic priest and Franciscan friar who served as a missionary in Brazil for more than forty years. He was the first African American to join the Conventual Friars Minor.

Ward has been proposed as a candidate for canonization by the Diocese of São João del Rei. In recognition of this, he now has the title Servant of God.

== Biography ==
Matthias DeWitte Ward was born in 1918 in the Charlestown neighborhood of Boston, Massachusetts, to William Henry Ward and Clara Irby, an interracial couple. Raised as a Methodist along with his twelve siblings, Ward later moved with his family to Washington, D.C., where he attended Dunbar High School, from which he graduated in 1939. During his high school years, he began to attend St. Augustine Catholic Church, which was the center of the Black Catholic community in the city. He converted to Catholicism at the age of 17 on May 6, 1937 and was confirmed at the Cathedral of St. Matthew the Apostle on May 30, 1940. Feeling a religious calling, he entered the seminary of the Salvatorian Fathers in 1942.

Ward left the seminary due to a pulmonary condition and moved to Brooklyn, New York, where he later applied to the Conventual Friars Minor. Most seminaries in the United States at the time were closed to Black men due to racism, but Ward was admitted to the Conventuals in June 1945 with the assurance that there were suitable assignments in the order for a Black priest. He was the first African American to join the order.

Ward took the religious name of Martin Maria de Porres, in honor of the famed Black Peruvian Dominican friar Martin de Porres and the mother of Jesus, when he was received into the friars' novitiate. Ward graduated from philosophy studies in 1949 at St. Anthony-on-Hudson Seminary in Rensselaer, New York, and continued his theology studies there in 1950. He was ordained to the priesthood on June 4, 1955, at the Cathedral of the Immaculate Conception in Albany, New York, by William Scully, the Bishop of Albany. Though some of his family members had shunned him for his conversion to Catholicism, two of his sisters attended his ordination. He later baptized his father on his deathbed.

After his ordination, Ward volunteered for the friars' missions in Brazil, a common outcome for African-American Catholic priests of the era. Most Catholic bishops in the United States refused to allow Black priests to serve in their dioceses because of their race. Most of the early African-American priests were ordained for religious communities and were steered toward overseas work. Ward arrived in Andrelândia in 1956 and worked at the São Boaventura School. Ward quickly learned Portuguese and became an educator in South America, where he also served as a pastor, chaplain, and vocations director. He later worked in Rio de Janeiro, Rio Grande do Sul and Goiás.

Ward's work was noticed by his fellow Black priests in the U.S., and Fr George Clements included Ward's work in his 1975 book about African-American Catholic clergy, Black Catholic Men of God.

In 1985, Ward was transferred from Goiatuba to Andrelândia, where he served as a spiritual director and teacher at a local seminary. He was known to entertain his fellow friars and his students with his sharp sense of humor and storytelling, and he often shared his vocation story and health issues and his struggle against anti-Black racism. In 1995, Ward was awarded the honorary title "Citizen of Andrelândia" for his service in the region.

On June 20, 1999, Ward suffered the characteristic symptoms of a heart attack during Mass but continued the liturgy. He suffered a second myocardial episode en route to Rio de Janeiro a day later and died on June 22.

== Sainthood cause ==
Spiritual devotion to Ward in Brazil began in earnest following his death, especially in Andrelândia where he had long served. His gravesite at the former São Francisco de Assis Seminary in that city has become a place of pilgrimage and the site of two reputed miracles as of 2022.

The local Conventual friars began seeking his canonization and received official permission from Bishop José Eudes Campos do Nascimento of São João del Rei in June 2020. The friars later installed portraits of Ward at each of their local parishes and composed a prayer for his canonization to be recited at all of their Masses. They also maintain a webpage to spread his life story and support his canonization. The cause for his canonization is being promoted by the Order's Curia in Rome as of the summer of 2022.

== See also ==
- Black Catholicism
- Order of Friars Minor Conventual
- Catholic Church in Brazil
