= 2023 Southern Miss Golden Eagles baseball team =

2023 Southern Miss baseball season

2023 Southern Miss Golden Eagles baseball

Sun Belt Conference Tournament champions Auburn Regional champions

Hattiesburg Super Regional, 1–2
- Conference: Sun Belt Conference

Ranking
- Coaches: No. 9
- CB: No. 10
- Record: 46–20 (22–8 SBC)
- Head coach: Scott Berry (14th season)
- Assistant coaches: Christian Ostrander; Travis Creel; Ben Brewer
- Home stadium: Pete Taylor Park

2023 Sun Belt Conference baseball standings
	Conf.				Overall
Team	W		L	PCT	W		L	PCT
No. 21 Coastal Carolina ‍†‍‍^{y}	23	–	7	.767	42	–	21	.667
No. 9 Southern Miss ‍‍‡‍^{y}	22	–	8	.733	46	–	20	.697
Troy ‍‍‍^{y}	18	–	12	.600	40	–	22	.645
Louisiana ‍‍‍^{y}	18	–	12	.600	41	–	24	.631
Texas State ‍‍‍	17	–	13	.567	36	–	23	.610
Appalachian State ‍‍‍	16	–	13	.552	30	–	25	.545
James Madison ‍‍‍	15	–	13	.536	31	–	25	.554
Georgia State ‍‍‍	16	–	14	.533	30	–	29	.508
Georgia Southern ‍‍‍	16	–	14	.533	27	–	29	.482
Old Dominion ‍‍‍	15	–	15	.500	32	–	23	.582
South Alabama ‍‍‍	11	–	19	.367	23	–	31	.426
Arkansas State ‍‍‍	9	–	19	.321	20	–	31	.392
Louisiana–Monroe ‍‍‍	6	–	23	.207	17	–	37	.315
Marshall ‍‍‍	5	–	25	.167	16	–	37	.302
† – Conference champion ‡ – Tournament champion y – Invited to the NCAA Tournament; As of June 25, 2023; Rankings from D1Baseball

The 2023 Southern Miss Golden Eagles baseball team represented University of Southern Mississippi during the 2023 NCAA Division I baseball season. The Golden Eagles played their home games at Pete Taylor Park and were led by fourteenth year head coach Scott Berry. This was their first year in the Sun Belt Conference, and the last season with legendary coach Scott Berry as head coach before his retirement during the offseason.

== Preseason ==
=== Signing Day Recruits ===
Player	Hometown	Previous Team
Pitchers
McCarty English	Ocean Springs, Mississippi	Ocean Springs HS
Peyton Lacy	Pass Christian, Mississippi	Pass Christian HS
Drake Meeks	Birmingham, Alabama	Briarwood Christian
Hitters
Cal Culpepper	Clarksdale, Mississippi	Clarkdale HS
TJ Dunsford	Jackson, Mississippi	East Central HS
Ty Durham	Bentonville, Arkansas	Bentonville West HS
Brayson Hubbard	Ocean Springs, Mississippi	Ocean Springs HS
Jacob Keys	Brandon, Mississippi	Brandon HS
Josh Och	Chanhassen, Minnesota	Chanhassen HS
Lawson Odom	Laurel, Mississippi	West Jones HS
Seth Smith	Mobile, Alabama	Mobile Christian

=== Sun Belt Conference Coaches Poll ===
The Sun Belt Conference Coaches Poll was released on February 8, 2023. In their inaugural Sun Belt season, Southern Miss was picked to win the conference 192 votes and 11 first place votes.

Coaches poll
Predicted finish	Team	Votes (1st place)
1	Southern Miss	192 (11)
T2	Georgia Southern	158
T2	Texas State	158 (1)
4	Louisiana	154 (1)
5	Coastal Carolina	151 (1)
6	South Alabama	123
7	Old Dominion	116
8	Troy	109
9	Georgia State	76
10	James Madison	73
11	Louisiana–Monroe	58
12	Appalachian State	43
13	Marshall	36
14	Arkansas State	23

=== Preseason All-Sun Belt Team & Honors ===
- Tanner Hall (USM Jr, Pitcher)
- Levi Wells (TXST Jr, Pitcher)
- Zeke Woods (TXST Sr, Pitcher)
- Triston Dixon (TXST Sr, Pitcher)
- Julian Brock (LA Jr, Catcher)
- Carson Roccaforte (LA Jr, 1st Base)
- Jesse Sherrill (GASO Sr, 2nd Base)
- Dustin Dickerson (USM Jr, Shortstop)
- Jarrett Brown (GASO Jr, 3rd Base)
- Max Ryerson (GSU Sr, Outfielder)
- Carson Paetow (USM, So, Outfielder)
- Jose Gonzalez (TXST Sr, Outfielder)
- Noah Ledford (GASO, RS-Sr, Designated Hitter)
- Cameron Jones (GSU Jr, Utility)

== Personnel ==
2023 Southern Miss Golden Eagles baseball team
Players
Coaches

#	Pos.	Name	B/T	Height	Weight	Year	Home town
1	INF	Creek Robertson (redshirt)	/	5 ft 11 in (1.8 m)	179 lb (81 kg)	Fr	Madison, Mississippi
2	OF	Jake Cook	/	6 ft 1 in (1.85 m)	185 lb (84 kg)	Fr	Madison, Mississippi
3	OF	Matthew Etzel	/	6 ft 2 in (1.88 m)	211 lb (96 kg)	Jr	League City, Texas
4	OF	Tate Parker	/	5 ft 8 in (1.73 m)	211 lb (96 kg)	Jr	Gulfport, Mississippi
5	C	Graham Crawford	/	5 ft 11 in (1.8 m)	186 lb (84 kg)	Jr	Sumrall, Mississippi
6	OF	Bryce Fowler	/	5 ft 11 in (1.8 m)	183 lb (83 kg)	Fr	Madison, Mississippi
7	OF	Slade Wilks	/	6 ft 2 in (1.88 m)	220 lb (100 kg)	Jr	Columbia, Mississippi
8	INF	Nick Monistere	/	5 ft 11 in (1.8 m)	181 lb (82 kg)	Fr	Brandon, Mississippi
9	RHP	Isaiah Rhodes	/	6 ft 2 in (1.88 m)	173 lb (78 kg)	Jr	McKinney, Texas
10	INF	Dustin Dickerson	/	6 ft 1 in (1.85 m)	180 lb (82 kg)	Jr	Laurel, Mississippi
11	INF	Davis Gillespie	/	6 ft 1 in (1.85 m)	205 lb (93 kg)	Fr	Birmingham, Alabama
12	LHP	Kros Sivley (redshirt)	/	5 ft 11 in (1.8 m)	183 lb (83 kg)	Fr	Sumrall, Mississippi
13	RHP	Matthew Adams	/	5 ft 11 in (1.8 m)	189 lb (86 kg)	Jr	Pearland, Texas
14	OF	Reece Ewing	/	5 ft 10 in (1.78 m)	185 lb (84 kg)	Sr	Mobile, Alabama
15	C	Rodrigo Montenegro	/	5 ft 9 in (1.75 m)	199 lb (90 kg)	Jr	Guatemala City, Guatemala
16	INF	Casey Artigues (redshirt)	/	5 ft 8 in (1.73 m)	173 lb (78 kg)	Fr	Hammond, Louisiana
18	RHP	JB Middleton	/	6 ft 0 in (1.83 m)	172 lb (78 kg)	Fr	Yazoo City, Mississippi
19	INF	Matthew Russo (redshirt)	/	6 ft 3 in (1.91 m)	248 lb (112 kg)	Fr	Madisonville, Louisiana
20	INF	Brady Faust	/	5 ft 11 in (1.8 m)	175 lb (79 kg)	Jr	New Orleans, Louisiana
21	RHP	Billy Oldham	/	6 ft 1 in (1.85 m)	217 lb (98 kg)	Jr	Brookfield, Connecticut
22	INF	Gabe Luucy	/	6 ft 0 in (1.83 m)	203 lb (92 kg)	Sr	Gulfport, Mississippi
23	RHP	Niko Mazza	/	5 ft 11 in (1.8 m)	194 lb (88 kg)	So	Madison, Mississippi
24		Jackson Parker	/	6 ft 0 in (1.83 m)	239 lb (108 kg)	Fr	Stringer, Mississippi
25	C	Blake Johnson	/	5 ft 9 in (1.75 m)	190 lb (86 kg)	Sr	Gulfport, Mississippi
26	INF	Danny Lynch	/	6 ft 3 in (1.91 m)	223 lb (101 kg)	Sr	Jupiter, Florida
27	RHP	Luke Trahan	/	6 ft 0 in (1.83 m)	203 lb (92 kg)	Jr	The Woodlands, Texas
28	RHP	Tanner Hall	/	6 ft 1 in (1.85 m)	186 lb (84 kg)	Jr	Zachary, Louisiana
29	LHP	Chandler Best	/	6 ft 0 in (1.83 m)	203 lb (92 kg)	Jr	Mobile, Alabama
30	RHP	Will Armistead	/	6 ft 2 in (1.88 m)	214 lb (97 kg)	So	Mooreville, Mississippi
32	RHP	Chandler Dawson	/	6 ft 1 in (1.85 m)	178 lb (81 kg)	Jr	Warner Robins, Georgia
33	RHP	Holland Townes	/	6 ft 3 in (1.91 m)	217 lb (98 kg)	Jr	Ridgeland, Mississippi
35	LHP	Justin Storm	/	6 ft 7 in (2.01 m)	232 lb (105 kg)	Jr	Madison, Mississippi
36	C	Tucker Stockman	/	6 ft 4 in (1.93 m)	226 lb (103 kg)	Fr	Athens, Alabama
37	OF	Carson Paetow	/	6 ft 3 in (1.91 m)	214 lb (97 kg)	So	Vancleave, Mississippi
38	RHP	Colby Allen	/	5 ft 11 in (1.8 m)	177 lb (80 kg)	Fr	Louisville, Mississippi
41		Christopher Sargent	/	6 ft 1 in (1.85 m)	218 lb (99 kg)	Sr	Wilmer, Alabama
45	INF	Braden Luke	/	5 ft 10 in (1.78 m)	225 lb (102 kg)	Jr	Collinsville, Mississippi
48	OF	Chase Adams	/	6 ft 2 in (1.88 m)	190 lb (86 kg)	Fr	Normal, Illinois

Head coach

Scott Berry (Southwest Missouri State)

Assistant coach(es)

Christian Ostrander (Delta State)
Travis Creel (Southern Miss)
Ben Brewer (Belhaven)

Legend

- (C) Team captain
- (S) Suspended
- (I) Ineligible
- Injured
- Current redshirt

Roster Source:

== Schedule and results ==
Legend
	Southern Miss win
	Southern Miss loss
	Postponement/Cancelation/Suspensions
**Bold**	Southern Miss team member

2023 Southern Miss Golden Eagles baseball game log
Regular season

February (5–3)
Date	Opponent	Rank	Site/stadium	Score	Win	Loss	Save	TV	Attendance	Overall record	SBC record
Feb. 17	Liberty	No. 18	Pete Taylor Park • Hattiesburg, MS	**W** 3–0	**Hall** (1–0)	Horn (0–1)	**Storm** (1)	ESPN+	5,267	1–0	
Feb. 18	Liberty	No. 18	Pete Taylor Park • Hattiesburg, MS	**W** 2–1	**Sivley** (1–0)	Germanowski (0–1)	None	ESPN+	5,342	2–0	
Feb. 19	Liberty	No. 18	Pete Taylor Park • Hattiesburg, MS	**W** 7–2	**Mazza** (1–0)	Tepper (0–1)	None	ESPN+	5,243	3–0	
Feb. 21	New Orleans	No. 18	Pete Taylor Park • Hattiesburg, MS	**W** 12–0	**Oldham** (1–0)	Cabrera (0–1)	None	ESPN+	5,273	4–0	
Feb. 24	Illinois	No. 18	Pete Taylor Park • Hattiesburg, MS	**L** 5–13	Glassey (1–0)	**Hall** (0–1)	None	ESPN+	5,321	4–1	
Feb. 25	Illinois	No. 18	Pete Taylor Park • Hattiesburg, MS	**W** 14–13^{11}	**Monistere** (1–0)	Sanchez (0–2)	None	ESPN+	5,247	5–1	
Feb. 26	Illinois	No. 18	Pete Taylor Park • Hattiesburg, MS	**L** 4–9	Wenninger (2–0)	**Mazza** (1-1)	None	ESPN+	5,230	5–2	
Feb. 28	vs. Mississippi State	No. 25	Trustmark Park • Pearl, MS	**L** 9–10	Dohm (1-1)	**Middleton** (0–1)	None	SECN+	6,542	5–3	

March (10–6)
Date	Opponent	Rank	Site/stadium	Score	Win	Loss	Save	TV	Attendance	Overall record	SBC record
Mar. 3	Dallas Baptist	No. 25	Pete Taylor Park • Hattiesburg, MS	**W** 4–3	**Hall** (2–1)	Bragg (2–1)	**Storm** (2)	ESPN+	5,257	6–3	
Mar. 4	Dallas Baptist	No. 25	Pete Taylor Park • Hattiesburg, MS	**W** 2–1	**Adams** (1–0)	Johnson (1-1)	**Storm** (3)	ESPN+	5,292	7–3	
Mar. 5	Dallas Baptist	No. 25	Pete Taylor Park • Hattiesburg, MS	**W** 7–2	**Mazza** (2–1)	Hammer (2–1)	None	ESPN+	5,275	8–3	
Mar. 7	at No. 4 Ole Miss	No. 22	Swayze Field • Oxford, MS	**L** 5–11	Quinn (3–0)	**Allen** (0–1)	Kimbrell (1)	SECN+	10,551	8–4	
Mar. 10	Valparaiso	No. 22	Pete Taylor Park • Hattiesburg, MS	**L** 1–6	Rosenkranz (2–1)	**Hall** (2-2)	Mintz (1)	ESPN+	5,210	8–5	
Mar. 11	Valparaiso	No. 22	Pete Taylor Park • Hattiesburg, MS	**W** 8–3	**Adams** (2–0)	Jablonski (0–2)	**Sivley** (1)	ESPN+	5,220	9–5	
Mar. 12	Valparaiso	No. 22	Pete Taylor Park • Hattiesburg, MS	**W** 11–5	**Mazza** (3–1)	McCluskey (1–2)	None	ESPN+	5,131	10–5	
Mar. 14	at Southeastern Louisiana	No. 25	Pat Kenelly Diamond at Alumni Field • Hammond, LA	**W** 8–1	**Oldham** (2–0)	Long (1–2)	None	ESPN+	2,147	11–5	
Mar. 17	at Texas State	No. 25	Bobcat Ballpark • San Marcos, TX	**W** 4–2	**Hall** (3–2)	Bush (0–1)	**Sivley** (2)	ESPN+	1,549	12–5	1–0
Mar. 18	at Texas State	No. 25	Bobcat Ballpark • San Marcos, TX	**L** 2–3	Wells (4–0)	**Adams** (2–1)	Dixon (4)	ESPN+	1,643	12–6	1–1
Mar. 19	at Texas State	No. 25	Bobcat Ballpark • San Marcos, TX	**L** 5–8	Dixon (1–0)	**Rhodes** (0–1)	McCaffety (1)	ESPN+	1,519	12–7	1–2
Mar. 21	at New Orleans		Maestri Field at Privateer Park • New Orleans, LA	**L** 3–6	Menina (1–0)	**Oldham** (2–1)	None	ESPN+	1,249	12–8	
Mar. 24	Georgia Southern		Pete Taylor Park • Hattiesburg, MS	**W** 4–3	**Hall** (4–2)	Fisher (2-2)	**Sivley** (3)	ESPN+	5,237	13–8	2–2
Mar. 25	Georgia Southern		Pete Taylor Park • Hattiesburg, MS	**W** 9–7	**Storm** (1–0)	Thompson (0–2)	None	ESPN+	5,367	14–8	3–2
Mar. 25	Georgia Southern		Pete Taylor Park • Hattiesburg, MS	**L** 8–10	Thompson (1-1)	**Middleton** (0–2)	None	ESPN+	5,367	14–9	3–3
Mar. 28	vs. Ole Miss		Trustmark Park • Pearl, MS	Game declared no contest							
Mar. 31	at Troy		Riddle–Pace Field • Troy, AL	**W** 4–1	**Hall** (5–2)	Fuller (2–3)	None	ESPN+	1,923	15–9	4–3

April (13–6)
Date	Opponent	Rank	Site/stadium	Score	Win	Loss	Save	TV	Attendance	Overall record	SBC record
Apr. 1	at Troy		Riddle–Pace Field • Troy, AL	**L** 4–5^{10}	Fruit (4–1)	**Storm** (1-1)	None	ESPN+	1,841	15–10	4–4
Apr. 2	at Troy		Riddle–Pace Field • Troy, AL	**W** 13–3	**Rhodes** (1-1)	Stewart (3–2)	**Oldham** (1)	ESPN+	1,803	16–10	5–4
Apr. 4	Southeastern Louisiana		Pete Taylor Park • Hattiesburg, MS	**W** 10–6	**Sivley** (2–0)	Aspholm (0–2)	None	ESPN+	5,232	17–10	
Apr. 6	at Old Dominion		Bud Metheny Baseball Complex • Norfolk, VA	**W** 4–2	**Hall** (6–2)	Morgan (3-3)	**Sivley** (4)	ESPN+	313	18–10	6–4
Apr. 8	at Old Dominion		Bud Metheny Baseball Complex • Norfolk, VA	**L** 7–8	Armstrong (6–0)	**Adams** (2-2)	Cook (2)	ESPN3	150	18–11	6–5
Apr. 8	at Old Dominion		Bud Metheny Baseball Complex • Norfolk, VA	**W** 11–8	**Oldham** (3–1)	Brown (2-2)	**Mazza** (1)	ESPN3	150	19–11	7–5
Apr. 11	at Alabama		Sewell–Thomas Stadium • Tuscaloosa, AL	**L** 0–13	McNairy (5–1)	**Middleton** (0–3)	None	SECN+	3,325	19–12	
Apr. 14	James Madison		Pete Taylor Park • Hattiesburg, MS	**W** 7–6	**Hall** (7–2)	Ertlschweiger (2–1)	**Storm** (4)	ESPN+	5,215	20–12	8–5
Apr. 15	James Madison		Pete Taylor Park • Hattiesburg, MS	**W** 7–1	**Armistead** (1–0)	Entsminger (0–2)	None	ESPN+	5,225	21–12	9–5
Apr. 16	James Madison		Pete Taylor Park • Hattiesburg, MS	**W** 15–2^{7}	**Mazza** (4–1)	Murphy (3–2)	None	ESPN+	5,208	22–12	10–5
Apr. 18	at Louisiana Tech	No. 24	J. C. Love Field at Pat Patterson Park • Ruston, LA	**L** 1–3	Smith (2–3)	**Rhodes** (1–2)	Tompkins (3)	CUSA.tv	1,950	22–13	
Apr. 21	at No. 10 Coastal Carolina	No. 24	Springs Brooks Stadium • Conway, SC	**L** 7–15	Potok (3–2)	**Hall** (7–3)	None	ESPN+	2,158	22–14	10–6
Apr. 22	at No. 10 Coastal Carolina	No. 24	Springs Brooks Stadium • Conway, SC	**L** 7–20	Horn (2–1)	**Oldham** (3–2)	None	ESPN+	1,628	22–15	10–7
Apr. 23	at No. 10 Coastal Carolina	No. 24	Springs Brooks Stadium • Conway, SC	**W** 15–7	**Storm** (2–1)	Sharkey (4–1)	None	ESPN+	2,207	23–15	11–7
Apr. 25	at Tulane		Greer Field at Turchin Stadium • New Orleans, LA	**W** 11–10	**Rhodes** (2-2)	Fowler (0–2)	**Storm** (5)	ESPN+	1,878	24–15	
Apr. 26	Louisiana Tech		Pete Taylor Park • Hattiesburg, MS	**W** 6–5	**Mazza** (5–1)	Sparks (3-3)	**Monistere** (1)	ESPN+	5,204	25–15	
Apr. 28	Arkansas State		Pete Taylor Park • Hattiesburg, MS	**W** 12–1	**Hall** (8–3)	Draper (0–3)	None	ESPN+	5,257	26–15	12–7
Apr. 29	Arkansas State		Pete Taylor Park • Hattiesburg, MS	**W** 4–1	**Oldham** (4–2)	Carmack (4–2)	**Storm** (6)	ESPN+	5,246	27–15	13–7
Apr. 30	Arkansas State		Pete Taylor Park • Hattiesburg, MS	**W** 17–7^{8}	**Rhodes** (3–2)	Butts (2–4)	None	ESPN+	5,216	28–15	14–7

May (9–1)
Date	Opponent	Rank	Site/stadium	Score	Win	Loss	Save	TV	Attendance	Overall record	SBC record
May 2	Tulane		Pete Taylor Park • Hattiesburg, MS	**W** 10–5	**Sivley** (3–0)	Wachter (1–4)	None	ESPN+	5,211	29–15	
May 5	South Alabama		Pete Taylor Park • Hattiesburg, MS	**W** 6–4	**Hall** (9–3)	Moore (3–1)	**Storm** (7)	ESPN+	5,326	30–15	15–7
May 6	South Alabama		Pete Taylor Park • Hattiesburg, MS	**W** 6–4	**Oldham** (5–2)	Homniok (1-1)	**Storm** (8)	ESPN+	5,350	31–15	16–7
May 7	South Alabama		Pete Taylor Park • Hattiesburg, MS	**W** 6–1	**Adams** (1–0)	Lee (2–6)	**Mazza** (2)	ESPN+	5,413	32–15	17–7
May 12	at Louisiana–Monroe	No. 25	Lou St. Amant Field • Monroe, LA	**W** 8–4	**Hall** (10–3)	Judice (2–3)	None	ESPN+	1,126	33–15	18–7
May 13	at Louisiana–Monroe	No. 25	Lou St. Amant Field • Monroe, LA	**W** 19–0	**Oldham** (6–2)	Barlow (3–6)	None	ESPN+	1,178	34–15	19–7
May 14	at Louisiana–Monroe	No. 25	Lou St. Amant Field • Monroe, LA	**W** 6–2	**Adams** (3–2)	Menard (2–6)	None	ESPN+	1,019	35–15	20–7
May 18	Louisiana	No. 23	Pete Taylor Park • Hattiesburg, MS	**W** 4–0	**Hall** (11–3)	Nezuh (8–5)	None	ESPN+	5,315	36–15	21–7
May 19	Louisiana	No. 23	Pete Taylor Park • Hattiesburg, MS	**L** 1–10	Fluno (3–0)	**Oldham** (6–3)	None	ESPN+	5,530	36–16	21–8
May 20	Louisiana	No. 23	Pete Taylor Park • Hattiesburg, MS	**W** 11–9	**Storm** (3–1)	Rawls (10–1)	None	ESPN+	5,429	37–16	22–8

Post-season

SBC Tournament (4–1)
Date	Opponent	(Seed)/Rank	Site/stadium	Score	Win	Loss	Save	TV	Attendance	Overall record	Tournament record
May 24	vs. (7) James Madison	(2)/No. 16	Montgomery Riverwalk Stadium • Montgomery, AL	**W** 7–1	**Hall** (12–3)	Murphy (5–4)	None	ESPN+		38–16	1–0
May 25	vs. (3) Troy	(2)/No. 16	Montgomery Riverwalk Stadium • Montgomery, AL	**W** 7–6	**Storm** (4–1)	Thompson (5–3)	None	ESPN+		39–16	2–0
May 27	vs. (6) Appalachian State	(2)/No. 16	Montgomery Riverwalk Stadium • Montgomery, AL	**L** 2–4	LaSpaluto (2-2)	**Sivley** (3–1)	Steensma (7)	ESPN+		39–17	2–1
May 27	vs. (6) Appalachian State	(2)/No. 16	Montgomery Riverwalk Stadium • Montgomery, AL	**W** 11–1^{7}	**Armistead** (2–0)	Hamilton (8–4)	None	ESPN+		40–17	3–1
May 28	vs. (4) Louisiana	(2)/No. 16	Montgomery Riverwalk Stadium • Montgomery, AL	**W** 6–2	**Storm** (5–1)	Moody (0–5)	None	ESPN+		41–17	4–1

NCAA tournament (5–3)
Date	Opponent	(Seed)/Rank	Site/stadium	Score	Win	Loss	Save	TV	Attendance	Overall record	Tournament record
Auburn Regional
Jun. 2	vs. (3) Samford	(2)/No. 13	Plainsman Park • Auburn, AL	**L** 2–4^{10}	Petschke (6–3)	**Storm** (5–2)	None	ESPN+	3,578	41–18	0–1
Jun. 3	at (1)/No. 20 Auburn	(2)/No. 13	Plainsman Park • Auburn, AL	**W** 7–2	**Oldham** (7–3)	Vail (5–2)	**Armistead** (1)	ESPN	4,096	42–18	1–1
Jun. 4	vs. (3) Samford	(2)/No. 13	Plainsman Park • Auburn, AL	**W** 9–4	**Sivley** (4–1)	Holifield (2–3)	**Dawson** (1)	ESPN+	3,517	43–18	2–1
Jun. 4	(4) Penn	(2)/No. 13	Plainsman Park • Auburn, AL	**W** 11–2	**Storm** (6–2)	Delany (1-1)	None	ESPN+	3,269	44–18	3–1
Jun. 5	(4) Penn	(2)/No. 13	Plainsman Park • Auburn, AL	**W** 11–7	**Oldham** (8–3)	Dromboski (7–3)	**Armistead** (2)	ESPN+	3,481	45–18	4–1
Hattiesburg Super Regional
Jun. 10	No. 21 Tennessee	No. 13	Pete Taylor Park • Hattiesburg, MS	**W** 5–3	**Storm** (7–2)	Lindsey (3-3)	None	ESPNU	5,820	46–18	1–0
Jun. 11	No. 21 Tennessee	No. 13	Pete Taylor Park • Hattiesburg, MS	**L** 4–8	Dollander (7–6)	**Hall** (12–4)	None	ESPN	5,822	46–19	1–1
Jun. 12	No. 21 Tennessee	No. 13	Pete Taylor Park • Hattiesburg, MS	**L** 0–5	Beam (9–4)	**Mazza** (5–2)	Burns (2)	ESPNU	5,809	46–20	1–2

Schedule source:

*Rankings are based on the team's current ranking in the D1Baseball poll.

== Auburn Regional ==
Auburn Regional Teams
(1) Auburn Tigers	(2) Southern Miss Golden Eagles	(3) Samford Bulldogs	(4) Penn Quakers

First Round
1	No. 20 Auburn	3
4	Penn	6^{11}
3	Samford	4
2	No. 13 Southern Miss	2^{10}
Lower round 1
1	No. 20 Auburn	2
2	No. 13 Southern Miss	7

Semi-Finals
4	Penn	5
3	Samford	4
Lower final
3	No. 13 Southern Miss	9
3	Samford	4

Finals
4	Penn	2	7
2	No. 13 Southern Miss	11	11

== Hattiesburg Super Regional ==
Hattiesburg Super Regional Teams
Southern Miss Golden Eagles	Tennessee Volunteers

Game 1
Rank	Team	Score
	Tennessee	3
	Southern Miss	5

Game 2
Rank	Team	Score
	Tennessee	8
	Southern Miss	4

Game 2
Rank	Team	Score
	Tennessee	5
	Southern Miss	0

== Rankings ==
Ranking movements Legend: ██ Increase in ranking ██ Decrease in ranking
	Week																		
Poll	Pre	1	2	3	4	5	6	7	8	9	10	11	12	13	14	15	16	17	Final
Coaches'		*		24	25									24	23	19	19	19	9
Baseball America	21	18	25	22	25					25						17	17	17	12
Collegiate Baseball^	18	18	25	30								30	27	14	12	13	9	10	10
NCBWA†	20	15	22	22	27								29	24	21	17	10	10	10
D1Baseball										24			25	23	16	13	13	13	9

^ Collegiate Baseball ranked 40 teams in their preseason poll, but only ranked 30 teams weekly during the season.
† NCBWA ranks 30 teams in their preseason poll, but only ranks 25 teams weekly during the season.
* A new poll was not released for this week, so for comparison purposes, the previous week's ranking is inserted in this week's slot.
