= 2023 Louisiana Ragin' Cajuns baseball team =

American college baseball season

2023 Louisiana Ragin' Cajuns baseball

Coral Gables Regional, 1–2
- Conference: Sun Belt Conference
- Record: 41–24 (18–12 SBC)
- Head coach: Matt Deggs (4th season)
- Assistant coaches: Seth Thibodeaux; Jake Wells; Zach Lafleur
- Home stadium: M. L. Tigue Moore Field at Russo Park

2023 Sun Belt Conference baseball standings
| | Conf. | | | | Overall |
| Team | W | | L | PCT | W | | L | PCT |
|---|---|---|---|---|---|---|---|---|
| No. 21 Coastal Carolina ‍†‍‍^{y} | 23 | – | 7 | .767 | 42 | – | 21 | .667 |
| No. 9 Southern Miss ‍‍‡‍^{y} | 22 | – | 8 | .733 | 46 | – | 20 | .697 |
| Troy ‍‍‍^{y} | 18 | – | 12 | .600 | 40 | – | 22 | .645 |
| Louisiana ‍‍‍^{y} | 18 | – | 12 | .600 | 41 | – | 24 | .631 |
| Texas State ‍‍‍ | 17 | – | 13 | .567 | 36 | – | 23 | .610 |
| Appalachian State ‍‍‍ | 16 | – | 13 | .552 | 30 | – | 25 | .545 |
| James Madison ‍‍‍ | 15 | – | 13 | .536 | 31 | – | 25 | .554 |
| Georgia State ‍‍‍ | 16 | – | 14 | .533 | 30 | – | 29 | .508 |
| Georgia Southern ‍‍‍ | 16 | – | 14 | .533 | 27 | – | 29 | .482 |
| Old Dominion ‍‍‍ | 15 | – | 15 | .500 | 32 | – | 23 | .582 |
| South Alabama ‍‍‍ | 11 | – | 19 | .367 | 23 | – | 31 | .426 |
| Arkansas State ‍‍‍ | 9 | – | 19 | .321 | 20 | – | 31 | .392 |
| Louisiana–Monroe ‍‍‍ | 6 | – | 23 | .207 | 17 | – | 37 | .315 |
| Marshall ‍‍‍ | 5 | – | 25 | .167 | 16 | – | 37 | .302 |
† – Conference champion ‡ – Tournament champion y – Invited to the NCAA Tournament; As of June 25, 2023; Rankings from D1Baseball

The 2023 Louisiana Ragin' Cajuns baseball team represented the University of Louisiana at Lafayette during the 2023 NCAA Division I baseball season. The Ragin' Cajuns played their home games at M. L. Tigue Moore Field at Russo Park and were led by fourth–year head coach Matt Deggs. They were members of the Sun Belt Conference.

== Preseason ==
=== Signing Day Recruits ===
| Player | Hometown | Previous Team |
Pitchers
| Thomas Couvillion | Lafayette, Louisiana | St. Thomas Moore Catholic HS |
| Tate Hess | Singer, Louisiana | Singer HS |
| Drew Kirby | Cypress, Texas | Cypress Woods HS |
| Riley Marcotte | Loreauville, Louisiana | Loreauville HS |
| Chase Morgan | Cypress, Texas | Cypress Woods HS |
| Johnathan Rogers | Tupelo, Mississippi | Tupelo HS |
| Jon Robert Tollett | Ruston, Louisiana | Ruston HS |
Hitters
| Micah Kendrick | Rockwall, Texas | Rockwall HS |
| Maddox Mandino | Minden, Louisiana | Glenbrook |
| Bennett Mittelsteadt | Lafayette, Louisiana | Teurlings Catholic HS |
| Clayton Pourciau | Baton Rouge, Louisiana | Catholic HS |
| Montravious Winn | Ridgeland, Mississippi | Ridgeland HS |

=== Sun Belt Conference Coaches Poll ===
The Sun Belt Conference Coaches Poll was released on February 8, 2023. Louisiana was picked to finish fourth with 154 votes and 1 first place vote.

Coaches poll
| Predicted finish | Team | Votes (1st place) |
| 1 | Southern Miss | 192 (11) |
| T2 | Georgia Southern | 158 |
| T2 | Texas State | 158 (1) |
| 4 | Louisiana | 154 (1) |
| 5 | Coastal Carolina | 151 (1) |
| 6 | South Alabama | 123 |
| 7 | Old Dominion | 116 |
| 8 | Troy | 109 |
| 9 | Georgia State | 76 |
| 10 | James Madison | 73 |
| 11 | Louisiana–Monroe | 58 |
| 12 | Appalachian State | 43 |
| 13 | Marshall | 36 |
| 14 | Arkansas State | 23 |

=== Preseason All-Sun Belt Team & Honors ===
- Tanner Hall (USM, Jr, Pitcher)
- Levi Wells (TXST, Jr, Pitcher)
- Zeke Woods (TXST, Sr, Pitcher)
- Triston Dixon (TXST, Sr, Pitcher)
- Julian Brock (LA, Jr, Catcher)
- Carson Roccaforte (LA, Jr, 1st Base)
- Jesse Sherrill (GASO, Sr, 2nd Base)
- Dustin Dickerson (USM, Jr, Shortstop)
- Jarrett Brown (GASO, Jr, 3rd Base)
- Max Ryerson (GSU, Sr, Outfielder)
- Carson Paetow (USM, So, Outfielder)
- Jose Gonzalez (TXST, Sr, Outfielder)
- Noah Ledford (GASO, RS-Sr, Designated Hitter)
- Cameron Jones (GSU, Jr, Utility)

== Personnel ==
2023 Louisiana Ragin' Cajuns baseball team
Players
Coaches

| # | Pos. | Name | B/T | Height | Weight | Year | Home town |
|---|---|---|---|---|---|---|---|
| 2 | LHP | Landrey Wilkerson | L/L | 5 ft 10 in (1.78 m) | 190 lb (86 kg) | Jr | Van Buren, Arkansas |
| 4 | C | Julian Brock | R/R | 6 ft 3 in (1.91 m) | 220 lb (100 kg) | Jr | Fulshear, Texas |
| 5 | LHP | Blake Marshall | L/L | 6 ft 0 in (1.83 m) | 185 lb (84 kg) | Jr | Mandeville, Louisiana |
| 6 | RHP | David Christie | R/R | 6 ft 5 in (1.96 m) | 220 lb (100 kg) | Jr | Lafayette, Louisiana |
| 7 | OF | Max Marusak | R/R | 6 ft 0 in (1.83 m) | 185 lb (84 kg) | Sr | Amarillo, Texas |
| 8 | OF | Heath Hood | R/R | 6 ft 0 in (1.83 m) | 190 lb (86 kg) | Sr | White Oak, Texas |
| 9 | INF | Peyton LeJeune | B/R | 5 ft 11 in (1.8 m) | 195 lb (88 kg) | Jr | Church Point, Louisiana |
| 10 | INF | John Taylor | L/R | 5 ft 11 in (1.8 m) | 190 lb (86 kg) | Jr | Tigard, Oregon |
| 11 | RHP | Jake Hammond | R/R | 6 ft 4 in (1.93 m) | 230 lb (104 kg) | Sr | Monroe, Louisiana |
| 12 | OF | Caleb Stelly | R/R | 6 ft 1 in (1.85 m) | 190 lb (86 kg) | Fr | Baton Rouge, Louisiana |
| 13 | OF | Will Veillon | R/R | 6 ft 2 in (1.88 m) | 205 lb (93 kg) | Sr | Rayne, Louisiana |
| 14 | INF | Trey LaFleur | L/L | 6 ft 3 in (1.91 m) | 195 lb (88 kg) | Jr | Pensacola, Florida |
| 15 | INF | Lee Amedee | L/R | 5 ft 11 in (1.8 m) | 200 lb (91 kg) | Fr | Gonzales, Louisiana |
| 16 | INF | Mason Zambo | L/R | 6 ft 2 in (1.88 m) | 215 lb (98 kg) | So | Baton Rouge, Louisiana |
| 17 | RHP | Cooper Rawls | R/R | 6 ft 1 in (1.85 m) | 200 lb (91 kg) | Sr | Hallsville, Texas |
| 18 | RHP | Luke Yuhasz | R/R | 6 ft 3 in (1.91 m) | 210 lb (95 kg) | Fr | Moss Bluff, Louisiana |
| 19 | LHP | Dylan Theut | R/L | 6 ft 0 in (1.83 m) | 180 lb (82 kg) | Jr | Fulshear, Texas |
| 20 | LHP | Steven Cash | L/L | 6 ft 0 in (1.83 m) | 175 lb (79 kg) | Fr | Centreville, Alabama |
| 21 | C | Clay Wargo | R/R | 5 ft 10 in (1.78 m) | 200 lb (91 kg) | So | Huntingtown, Maryland |
| 22 | INF | Carson Roccaforte | L/L | 6 ft 1 in (1.85 m) | 195 lb (88 kg) | Jr | Port Neches, Texas |
| 23 | RHP | Brendan Moody | R/R | 6 ft 2 in (1.88 m) | 200 lb (91 kg) | Jr | Iowa, Louisiana |
| 24 | INF | Kyle DeBarge | R/R | 5 ft 9 in (1.75 m) | 170 lb (77 kg) | So | Kinder, Louisiana |
| 25 | RHP | Taylor Parrett | R/R | 6 ft 1 in (1.85 m) | 195 lb (88 kg) | Jr | Fargo, North Dakota |
| 26 | INF | Ben Robichaux | L/R | 5 ft 7 in (1.7 m) | 170 lb (77 kg) | Fr | Baton Rouge, Louisiana |
| 27 | RHP | Jerry Couch | R/R | 5 ft 10 in (1.78 m) | 200 lb (91 kg) | Sr | Bossier City, Louisiana |
| 29 | RHP | Blake McGehee (redshirt) | R/R | 5 ft 11 in (1.8 m) | 190 lb (86 kg) | Fr | Alexandria, Louisiana |
| 32 | RHP | Carson Fluno | R/R | 6 ft 1 in (1.85 m) | 185 lb (84 kg) | Jr | Sun Prairie, Wisconsin |
| 33 | OF | Conor Higgs | L/L | 6 ft 2 in (1.88 m) | 190 lb (86 kg) | So | Texas City, Texas |
| 35 | RHP | Jackson Nezuh | R/R | 6 ft 1 in (1.85 m) | 180 lb (82 kg) | Jr | St. Cloud, Florida |
| 40 | RHP | JT Etheridge | R/R | 6 ft 5 in (1.96 m) | 215 lb (98 kg) | Jr | Sweet Water, Alabama |
| 44 | | CJ Willis | L/R | 6 ft 3 in (1.91 m) | 195 lb (88 kg) | Sr | Ruston, Louisiana |
| 45 | LHP | Ben Tate | L/L | 6 ft 1 in (1.85 m) | 225 lb (102 kg) | So | Sunset, Louisiana |

Head coach

Matt Deggs (Northwestern State)

Assistant coach(es)

Seth Thibodeaux (William Carey)
Jake Wells (Montevallo)
Zach Lafleur (Louisiana)

Legend

- (C) Team captain
- (S) Suspended
- (I) Ineligible
- Injured
- Current redshirt

Roster
Last update: 28 December 2023

== Schedule and results ==
Legend
| | Louisiana win |
| | Louisiana loss |
| | Postponement/Cancelation/Suspensions |
| **Bold** | Louisiana team member |

2023 Louisiana Ragin' Cajuns baseball game log
Regular season (36–20)

February (6–2)
| Date | Opponent | Rank | Site/stadium | Score | Win | Loss | Save | TV | Attendance | Overall record | SBC record |
|---|---|---|---|---|---|---|---|---|---|---|---|
| Feb. 17 | at Rice | | Reckling Park • Houston, TX | **W** 5–4 | **Theut** (1-0) | Raj (0-1) | **Moody** (1) | CUSA.tv | 2,146 | 1–0 | |
| Feb. 18 | at Rice | | Reckling Park • Houston, TX | **W** 11–2 | **Rawls** (1-0) | Long (0-1) | None | CUSA.tv | 2,495 | 2–0 | |
| Feb. 19 | at Rice | | Reckling Park • Houston, TX | **L** 8–12 | Vincent (1-0) | **Tate** (0-1) | None | CUSA.tv | 2,187 | 2–1 | |
| Feb. 22 | BYU | | M. L. Tigue Moore Field at Russo Park • Lafayette, LA | **W** 4–3 | **Marshall** (1-0) | Porter (0-1) | None | | 3,896 | 3–1 | |
| Feb. 23 | BYU | | M. L. Tigue Moore Field at Russo Park • Lafayette, LA | **W** 11–0 | **Ray** (1-0) | Sterner (1-1) | None | ESPN+ | 3,771 | 4–1 | |
| Feb. 24 | BYU | | M. L. Tigue Moore Field at Russo Park • Lafayette, LA | **W** 2–1 | **Marshall** (2-0) | Olsen (0-1) | None | | 4,098 | 5–1 | |
| Feb. 25 | BYU | | M. L. Tigue Moore Field at Russo Park • Lafayette, LA | **W** 11–10 | **Rawls** (2-0) | Porter (0-2) | **Fluno** (1) | ESPN+ | 4,139 | 6–1 | |
| Feb. 28 | at McNeese | | Joe Miller Ballpark • Lake Charles, LA | **L** 4–5 | Morrow (1-0) | **Moody** (0-1) | Vega (1) | | 1,405 | 6–2 | |

March (12–6)
| Date | Opponent | Rank | Site/stadium | Score | Win | Loss | Save | TV | Attendance | Overall record | SBC record |
|---|---|---|---|---|---|---|---|---|---|---|---|
| Mar. 3 | Campbell | | M. L. Tigue Moore Field at Russo Park • Lafayette, LA | **L** 2–5 | Kuehler (2-0) | **Hammond** (0-1) | Cummings (1) | ESPN+ | 4,185 | 6–3 | |
| Mar. 4 | Campbell | | M. L. Tigue Moore Field at Russo Park • Lafayette, LA | **L** 6–8 | Daquila (3-0) | **Etheridge** (0-1) | Rund (1) | ESPN+ | 4,051 | 6–4 | |
| Mar. 5 | Campbell | | M. L. Tigue Moore Field at Russo Park • Lafayette, LA | **W** 14–7 | **Nezuh** (1-0) | Day (0-1) | None | ESPN+ | 4,029 | 7–4 | |
| Mar. 8 | McNeese | | M. L. Tigue Moore Field at Russo Park • Lafayette, LA | **W** 5–3 | **Ray** (2-0) | Lejeune (0-1) | **Marshall** (1) | ESPN+ | 3,959 | 8–4 | |
| Mar. 10 | High Point | | M. L. Tigue Moore Field at Russo Park • Lafayette, LA | **W** 8–6 | **Hammond** (1-1) | Garcia (0-3) | **Marshall** (2) | ESPN+ | 3,982 | 9–4 | |
| Mar. 11 | High Point | | M. L. Tigue Moore Field at Russo Park • Lafayette, LA | **L** 1–5 | Wozniak (1-0) | **Moody** (0-2) | None | ESPN+ | 3,973 | 9–5 | |
| Mar. 12 | High Point | | M. L. Tigue Moore Field at Russo Park • Lafayette, LA | **W** 6–5 | **Nezuh** (2-0) | Hughes (2-2) | **Marshall** (3) | ESPN+ | 3,798 | 10–5 | |
| Mar. 14 | Jackson State | | M. L. Tigue Moore Field at Russo Park • Lafayette, LA | **W** 7–0 | **Rawls** (3-0) | Francis (0-2) | None | ESPN+ | 3,681 | 11–5 | |
Hancock Whitney Classic
| Mar. 15 | vs. Mississippi State | | MGM Park • Biloxi, MS | **L** 2–4 | Holcombe (1-0) | **Hill** (0-1) | Dohm (2) | SECN+ | 5,816 | 11–6 | |
| Mar. 17 | Arkansas State | | M. L. Tigue Moore Field at Russo Park • Lafayette, LA | **W** 15–4 | **Hammond** (2-1) | Jeans (1-2) | None | ESPN+ | 3,677 | 12–6 | 1–0 |
| Mar. 18 | Arkansas State | | M. L. Tigue Moore Field at Russo Park • Lafayette, LA | **W** 13–5 | **Rawls** (4-0) | Draper (0-2) | **Fluno** (2) | ESPN+ | 3,734 | 13–6 | 2–0 |
| Mar. 19 | Arkansas State | | M. L. Tigue Moore Field at Russo Park • Lafayette, LA | **W** 3–1 | **Nezuh** (3-0) | Carmack (1-1) | **Marshall** (4) | ESPN+ | 3,697 | 14–6 | 3–0 |
| Mar. 21 | Grambling State | | M. L. Tigue Moore Field at Russo Park • Lafayette, LA | **W** 13–1^{7} | **Hill** (1-0) | Newman (0-3) | None | ESPN+ | 3,704 | 15–6 | |
| Mar. 22 | Southeastern Louisiana | | M. L. Tigue Moore Field at Russo Park • Lafayette, LA | **W** 2–0 | **Rawls** (5-0) | Long (1-3) | **Moody** (2) | ESPN+ | 3,786 | 16–6 | |
| Mar. 24 | at South Alabama | | Eddie Stanky Field • Mobile, AL | **L** 11–12 | Boyd (1-0) | **Moody** (0-3) | Wood (3) | ESPN+ | 1,288 | 16–7 | 3–1 |
| Mar. 24 | at South Alabama | | Eddie Stanky Field • Mobile, AL | **W** 22–5 | **Nezuh** (4-0) | Lee (0-4) | **Rawls** (1) | ESPN+ | 1,288 | 17–7 | 4–1 |
| Mar. 25 | at South Alabama | | Eddie Stanky Field • Mobile, AL | **W** 10–6 | **Etheridge** (1-1) | Wood (3-1) | **Tate** (1) | ESPN+ | 1,537 | 18–7 | 5–1 |
| Mar. 31 | Appalachian State | | M. L. Tigue Moore Field at Russo Park • Lafayette, LA | **L** 2–3 | Hamilton (5-1) | **Hammond** (2-2) | Steensma (4) | ESPN+ | 4,061 | 18–8 | 5–2 |

April (11–9)
| Date | Opponent | Rank | Site/stadium | Score | Win | Loss | Save | TV | Attendance | Overall record | SBC record |
|---|---|---|---|---|---|---|---|---|---|---|---|
| Apr. 1 | Appalachian State | | M. L. Tigue Moore Field at Russo Park • Lafayette, LA | **L** 5–8 | Wilson (2-2) | **Nezuh** (4-1) | Steensma (5) | ESPN+ | 4,095 | 18–9 | 5–3 |
| Apr. 2 | Appalachian State | | M. L. Tigue Moore Field at Russo Park • Lafayette, LA | **W** 6–0 | **Rawls** (6-0) | Cross (3-1) | None | ESPN+ | 3,832 | 19–9 | 6–3 |
| Apr. 4 | Tulane | | M. L. Tigue Moore Field at Russo Park • Lafayette, LA | **W** 8–7 | **Tate** (1-1) | Price (0-1) | None | ESPN+ | 4,093 | 20–9 | |
| Apr. 6 | at Marshall | | GoMart Ballpark • Charleston, WV | **W** 8–4 | **Hammond** (3-2) | Copen (2-3) | None | ESPN+ | 102 | 21–9 | 7–3 |
| Apr. 7 | at Marshall | | GoMart Ballpark • Charleston, WV | **W** 5–2 | **McGehee** (1-0) | Pacella (0-3) | **Christie** (1) | ESPN+ | 107 | 22–9 | 8–3 |
| Apr. 8 | at Marshall | | GoMart Ballpark • Charleston, WV | **W** 8–2 | **Nezuh** (5-1) | Addkison (2-5) | None | ESPN+ | 113 | 23–9 | 9–3 |
| Apr. 11 | Louisiana Tech | | M. L. Tigue Moore Field at Russo Park • Lafayette, LA | **W** 10–5 | **Rawls** (7-0) | Harland (0-4) | **Fluno** (3) | ESPN+ | 4,109 | 24–9 | |
| Apr. 12 | at Southeastern Louisiana | | Pat Kenelly Diamond at Alumni Field • Hammond, LA | **L** 4–5 | Spencer (1-0) | **Cash** (0-1) | Lauve (3) | ESPN+ | 1,208 | 24–10 | |
| Apr. 14 | Troy | | M. L. Tigue Moore Field at Russo Park • Lafayette, LA | **L** 6–9 | Fuller (3-3) | **Hammond** (3-3) | Fruit (1) | | 4,033 | 24–11 | 9–4 |
| Apr. 16 | Troy | | M. L. Tigue Moore Field at Russo Park • Lafayette, LA | **L** 2–6 | Stewart (4-2) | **Nezuh** (5-2) | Thompson (1) | ESPN+ | | 24–12 | 9–5 |
| Apr. 16 | Troy | | M. L. Tigue Moore Field at Russo Park • Lafayette, LA | **W** 2–1 | **Rawls** (8-0) | Manning (1-2) | None | ESPN+ | 4,049 | 25–12 | 10–5 |
| Apr. 18 | at No. 1 LSU | | Alex Box Stadium, Skip Bertman Field • Baton Rouge, LA | **W** 8–5 | **Christie** (1-0) | Cooper (1-2) | None | SECN+ | 11,784 | 26–12 | |
| Apr. 21 | at James Madison | | Eagle Field at Veterans Memorial Park • Harrisonburg, VA | **L** 8–10 | Kleinfelter (4-0) | **Marshall** (2-1) | None | ESPN+ | 601 | 26–13 | 10–6 |
| Apr. 22 | at James Madison | | Eagle Field at Veterans Memorial Park • Harrisonburg, VA | **L** 2–13 | Kinsler (2-0) | **Nezuh** (5-3) | None | ESPN+ | 311 | 26–14 | 10–7 |
| Apr. 23 | at James Madison | | Eagle Field at Veterans Memorial Park • Harrisonburg, VA | **L** 4–9 | Murphy (4-3) | **McGehee** (1-1) | None | ESPN+ | 519 | 26–15 | 10–8 |
| Apr. 25 | Southern | | M. L. Tigue Moore Field at Russo Park • Lafayette, LA | **W** 10–5 | **Rawls** (9-0) | Fidanza (3-1) | None | ESPN+ | 3,780 | 27–15 | |
| Apr. 26 | Northwestern State | | M. L. Tigue Moore Field at Russo Park • Lafayette, LA | **W** 15–3 | **Nezuh** (6-3) | Prestwich (4-3) | None | ESPN+ | 3,841 | 28–15 | |
| Apr. 28 | No. 6 Coastal Carolina | | M. L. Tigue Moore Field at Russo Park • Lafayette, LA | **W** 11–9 | **Theut** (2-0) | Potok (3-3) | None | ESPN+ | 4,008 | 29–15 | 11–8 |
| Apr. 29 | No. 6 Coastal Carolina | | M. L. Tigue Moore Field at Russo Park • Lafayette, LA | **L** 5–13 | Morrison (6-0) | **Nezub** (6-4) | Doyle (1) | ESPN+ | 4,029 | 29–16 | 11–9 |
| Apr. 30 | No. 6 Coastal Carolina | | M. L. Tigue Moore Field at Russo Park • Lafayette, LA | **L** 2–3^{11} | Sharkey (5-1) | **Moody** (0-4) | None | ESPN+ | 3,925 | 29–17 | 11–10 |

May (7–3)
| Date | Opponent | Rank | Site/stadium | Score | Win | Loss | Save | TV | Attendance | Overall record | SBC record |
|---|---|---|---|---|---|---|---|---|---|---|---|
| May 5 | at Louisiana–Monroe | | Lou St. Amant Field • Monroe, LA | **W** 8–4 | **Nezuh** (7-4) | Judice (2-2) | None | ESPN+ | 1,030 | 30–17 | 12–10 |
| May 6 | at Louisiana–Monroe | | Lou St. Amant Field • Monroe, LA | **W** 12–4 | **Fluno** (1-0) | Barlow (3-5) | None | ESPN+ | 1,077 | 31–17 | 13–10 |
| May 7 | at Louisiana–Monroe | | Lou St. Amant Field • Monroe, LA | **W** 10–0^{6} | **Rawls** (10-0) | Robinson (0-1) | None | ESPN+ | 1,055 | 32–17 | 14–10 |
| May 9 | at Louisiana Tech | | J. C. Love Field at Pat Patterson Park • Ruston, LA | **L** 8–12 | Bates (4-2) | **Couch** (0-1) | None | CUSA.tv | 2,409 | 32–18 | |
| May 12 | Texas State | | M. L. Tigue Moore Field at Russo Park • Lafayette, LA | **W** 7–3 | **Nezuh** (8-4) | Wells (7-3) | None | ESPN+ | 4,056 | 33–18 | 15–10 |
| May 13 | Texas State | | M. L. Tigue Moore Field at Russo Park • Lafayette, LA | **W** 9–5 | **Fluno** (2-0) | Wood (2-3) | **Christie** (2) | ESPN+ | 3,984 | 34–18 | 16–10 |
| May 14 | at Texas State | | M. L. Tigue Moore Field at Russo Park • Lafayette, LA | **W** 8–3 | **Couch** (1-1) | Robie (5-3) | None | ESPN+ | 3,749 | 35–18 | 17–10 |
| May 18 | at No. 23 Southern Miss | | Pete Taylor Park • Hattiesburg, MS | **L** 0–4 | Hall (11-3) | **Nezuh** (8-5) | None | ESPN+ | 5,315 | 35–19 | 17–11 |
| May 19 | at No. 23 Southern Miss | | Pete Taylor Park • Hattiesburg, MS | **W** 10–1 | **Fluno** (3-0) | Oldham (6-3) | None | ESPN+ | 5,530 | 36–19 | 18–11 |
| May 20 | at No. 23 Southern Miss | | Pete Taylor Park • Hattiesburg, MS | **L** 9–11 | Storm (3-1) | **Rawls** (10-1) | None | ESPN+ | 5,429 | 36–20 | 18–12 |

Postseason (5–4)

SBC Tournament (4–2)
| Date | Opponent | (Seed)/Rank | Site/stadium | Score | Win | Loss | Save | TV | Attendance | Overall record | Tournament record |
|---|---|---|---|---|---|---|---|---|---|---|---|
| May 24 | vs. (5) Texas State | (4) | Montgomery Riverwalk Stadium • Montgomery, AL | **W** 6–1 | **Nezuh** (9-5) | Wells (8-4) | **Rawls** (2) | ESPN+ | | 37–20 | 1–0 |
| May 25 | vs. (1)/No. 7 Coastal Carolina | (4) | Montgomery Riverwalk Stadium • Montgomery, AL | **L** 3–6 | Eikhoff (2-1) | **Fluno** (3-1) | Sharkey (10) | ESPN+ | | 37–21 | 1–1 |
| May 26 | vs. (5) Texas State | (4) | Montgomery Riverwalk Stadium • Montgomery, AL | **W** 12–6 | **Cash** (1-1) | Wood (2-4) | **Etheridge** (1) | ESPN+ | | 38–21 | 2–1 |
| May 27 | vs. (1)/No. 7 Coastal Carolina | (4) | Montgomery Riverwalk Stadium • Montgomery, AL | **W** 7–3 | **Couch** (2-1) | Horn (3-2) | **Marshall** (5) | ESPN+ | | 39–21 | 3–1 |
| May 27 | vs. (1)/No. 7 Coastal Carolina | (4) | Montgomery Riverwalk Stadium • Montgomery, AL | **L** 4–1 | **Marshall** (3-1) | Smith (4-2) | **Etheridge** (2) | ESPN+ | | 40–21 | 4–1 |
| May 28 | vs. (2)/No. 16 Southern Miss | (4) | Montgomery Riverwalk Stadium • Montgomery, AL | **L** 2–6 | Storm (5-1) | **Moody** (0-5) | None | ESPN+ | | 40–22 | 4–2 |

NCAA tournament (1–2)
| Date | Opponent | (Seed)/Rank | Site/stadium | Score | Win | Loss | Save | TV | Attendance | Overall record | Tournament record |
Coral Gables Regional
| Jun. 2 | vs. (2) Texas | (3) | Alex Rodriguez Park • Coral Gables, FL | **L** 2–4 | Gordan (7-1) | **Nezuh** (9-6) | Morehouse (6) | ESPN+ | 2,370 | 40–23 | 1–0 |
| Jun. 3 | vs. (4) Maine | (3) | Alex Rodriguez Park • Coral Gables, FL | **W** 19–10 | **Fluno** (4-1) | Leys (5-1) | None | ESPN+ | 2,355 | 41–23 | 1–1 |
| Jun. 5 | vs. (1)/No. 8 Miami | (3) | Alex Rodriguez Park • Coral Gables, FL | **L** 5–8 | Rosario (5-6) | **Marshall** (3-2) | Walters (12) | ESPN2 | 2,541 | 41–24 | 1–2 |

Schedule source:

*Rankings are based on the team's current ranking in the D1Baseball poll.

== Coral Gables Regional ==
College Station Regional Teams
| (1) Miami Hurricanes | (2) Texas Longhorns | (3) Louisiana Ragin' Cajuns | (4) Maine Black Bears |

First Round
1 | No. 8 Miami | 9
4 | Maine | 1
3 | Louisiana | 2
2 | Texas' | 4
Lower round 1
4 | Maine | 10
3 | Louisiana | 19

Semi-Finals
1 | No. 8 Miami | 1
2 | Texas | 4
Lower final
3 | Louisiana | 5
1 | No. 8 Miami | 8

Finals
2 | Texas | 10 | -
1 | No. 8 Miami | 6 | -

== Postseason ==
| Accolade | Recipient | Reference |
|---|---|---|
| ABCA First Team All-Region | Julian Brock, C | |
| ABCA Second Team All-Region | Cooper Rawls, P | |
| Sun Bell All-Conference Team | Julian Brock, C Kyle DeBarge, SS | |
