= Will Remillard =

American baseball coach (born 1992)

Cincinnati Reds – No. 94
- Catcher / Coach
- Born: September 18, 1992 (age 34); Cohoes, New York, U.S.
- Bats: Right Throws: Right
- Stats at Baseball Reference

Teams
- Cincinnati Reds (2025–present)

William Gregory Remillard (born September 18, 1992) is an American professional baseball coach and former catcher for the Cincinnati Reds of Major League Baseball (MLB). He played in Minor League Baseball for the Chicago Cubs organization

== Playing career ==
=== Amateur ===
Remillard attended the La Salle Institute in Troy, New York. He enrolled at Temple University and played college baseball for the Temple Owls. After his freshman year, Remillard transferred to Coastal Carolina University to play for the Coastal Carolina Chanticleers. In 2012, he played collegiate summer baseball for the Albany Dutchmen of the Perfect Game Collegiate Baseball League, and in 2013 for the Cotuit Kettleers of the Cape Cod Baseball League.

=== Chicago Cubs ===
The Chicago Cubs selected Remillard in the 19th round, with the 558th overall pick, of the 2013 Major League Baseball draft. He made his professional debut in 2014 with the Single-A Kane County Cougars, hitting .286/.372/.381 with one home run and 26 RBI over 49 games.

In 2015, Remillard underwent Tommy John surgery, causing him to miss the entire season; he subsequently re-injured the same elbow, necessitating another surgery which caused him to miss the 2016 season. Remillard returned to action in 2017 with the rookie-level Arizona League Cubs and Low-A Eugene Emeralds, going 10-for-25 (.400) with six RBI and five walks over eight games.

Remillard split the 2018 campaign between the Double-A Tennessee Smokies and Triple-A Iowa Cubs, batting a cumulative .203/.238/.291 with one home run and six RBI across 29 appearances. Remillard did not make an appearance during the 2019 season due to an injury as well as a coaching role within the organization. He elected free agency following the season on November 4, 2019.

== Coaching career ==
=== Chicago Cubs ===
In 2019, Remillard became a development coach for the Tennessee Smokies, the Double-A affiliate of the Chicago Cubs. On January 9, 2024, Remillard was promoted to the role of "Assistant Director, Hitting" within Chicago's baseball operations department.

=== Cincinnati Reds ===
On November 12, 2024, the Cincinnati Reds hired Remillard as an assistant hitting coach for their major league team.

== Personal life ==
Remillard's brother, Zach, made his MLB debut in 2023 for the Chicago White Sox, and currently plays for the Leones de Yucatán of the Mexican League.
