= Jeff Robinson (Siena basketball) =

American former basketball player

Personal information
- Born: circa 1969/1970
- Listed height: 6 ft 5 in (1.96 m)

Career information
- High school: La Salle Institute (Troy, New York)
- College: Siena (1986–1990)
- NBA draft: 1990: undrafted
- Position: Small forward / shooting guard

Career highlights
- North Atlantic Player of the Year (1989); First-team All-North Atlantic (1989); North Atlantic All-Rookie Team (1987)

Jeff Robinson (born circa 1969/1970) is an American former basketball player known for his career at Siena College, where in 1988–89 he was named the North Atlantic Conference Player of the Year.

== College career ==
A native of Troy, New York, Robinson spent his prep years at La Salle Institute. He then enrolled at Siena in 1986, where over the next four years he would become a Siena Hall of Fame player. As a freshman Robinson averaged 9.8 points, 3.9 rebounds, and 2.7 assists and was named to the North Atlantic Conference (now called America East Conference) All-Rookie Team. As a sophomore he increased two of his three averages while amassing 13.7 points, 5.5 rebounds, and 2.6 assists per game. They won the NAC title regular season title but lost in the conference tournament, thus did not get a bid to the 1988 NCAA tournament.

In 1988–89, Robinson's junior season, Siena repeated as conference regular season champions, but this time they won the NAC tournament and earned a berth into the 1989 NCAA tournament. The 14th-seeded Saints pulled off one of the upsets of the tournament by defeating 3rd-seeded Stanford in the first round, 80–78. They lost in the round of 32 to 11th-seeded Minnesota, 67–80, however. For the year, Robinson averaged a team-leading and career-high 19.8 points per game, along with a career-high 5.8 rebounds, and 2.1 assists. He was named to the All-North Atlantic First Team and was bestowed the honor of North Atlantic Conference Player of the Year.

The summer between Robinson's junior and senior years, Siena left the North Atlantic Conference to join the Metro Atlantic Athletic Conference (MAAC). While Robinson did not earn all-conference accolades in his new conference, he still averaged 14.9 points, 5.4 rebounds, and 2.7 assists per game. On January 18, 1990, he scored 23 points to surpass Eric Banks (1,432 points) as Siena's all-time leading scorer. Robinson finished his career with 1,657 points, which has since been surpassed as the number one spot at Siena but as of 2023–24 is still in the top ten all-time.

Siena inducted Robinson into their athletics hall of fame in 1996. In 2010, he was selected to the Upstate New York Basketball Hall of Fame.
