= Elias James Manning =

American-born Brazilian Roman Catholic bishop (1938–2019)

Elias James Manning O.F.M.Conv.
- Bishop of Valença
- Church: Catholic Church
- Diocese: Diocese of Valença
- In office: March 14, 1990 – February 12, 2014
- Predecessor: Amaury Castanho
- Successor: Nelson Francelino Ferreira

Orders
- Ordination: October 20, 1965 by Francis Edward Hyland
- Consecration: May 13, 1990 by Eugênio Sales

Personal details
- Born: April 14, 1938 Troy, New York, United States
- Died: October 13, 2019 (aged 81) Vassouras, Rio de Janeiro, Brazil

Elias James Manning, OFM Conv. (April 14, 1938 – October 13, 2019) was an American-born Brazilian Catholic bishop. He served as Bishop of Valença from 1990 to 2014. He was also a member of the Conventual Franciscans.

== Biography ==
Manning was born in Troy, New York, and had a brother and a sister. He attended La Salle Institute. After graduating in 1959, instead of attending college he decided to attend St. Anthony-on-Hudson Seminary in Rensselaer.

During his time in seminary he served on a mission trip to Puerto Rico, which inspired him to become a missionary and join the Conventual Franciscans. After graduating from seminary and being ordained in 1965 Manning traveled to Brazil, where he would spend his life as a Franciscan priest and missionary.

In 1990 he was appointed Bishop of Valença. Manning died on October 13, 2019 at the age of 81.
