= Rico Noel =

American baseball player (born 1989)

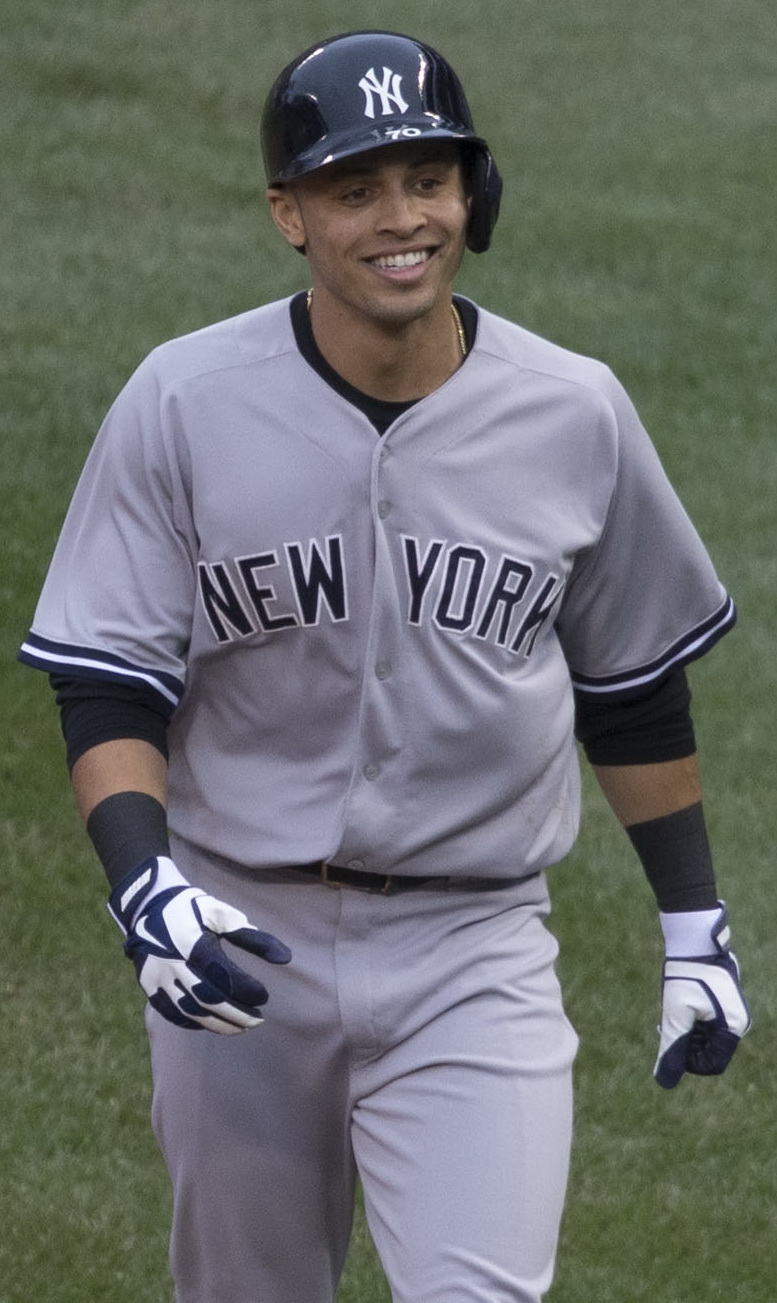
- Noel with the New York Yankees
- Outfielder
- Born: January 11, 1989 (age 37); Ville Platte, Louisiana, U.S.
- Batted: Right Threw: Right

MLB debut
- September 2, 2015, for the New York Yankees

Last appearance
- October 4, 2015, for the New York Yankees

MLB statistics
- Batting average: .500
- Home runs: 0
- Runs batted in: 0
- Stats at Baseball Reference

Teams
- New York Yankees (2015)

Jablonski Rico Noel (born January 11, 1989) is an American former professional baseball outfielder. He played in Major League Baseball (MLB) for the New York Yankees in 2015.

== Amateur career ==
Noel attended Lawton High School in Lawton, Oklahoma, where he started for the baseball, basketball, and American football teams. Deciding to pursue baseball over football, Noel enrolled at Coastal Carolina University to play college baseball for the Coastal Carolina Chanticleers. He began his college career as a second baseman, but became a center fielder in his sophomore year. In 2009, he played collegiate summer baseball with the Cotuit Kettleers of the Cape Cod Baseball League.

== Professional career ==
=== San Diego Padres ===
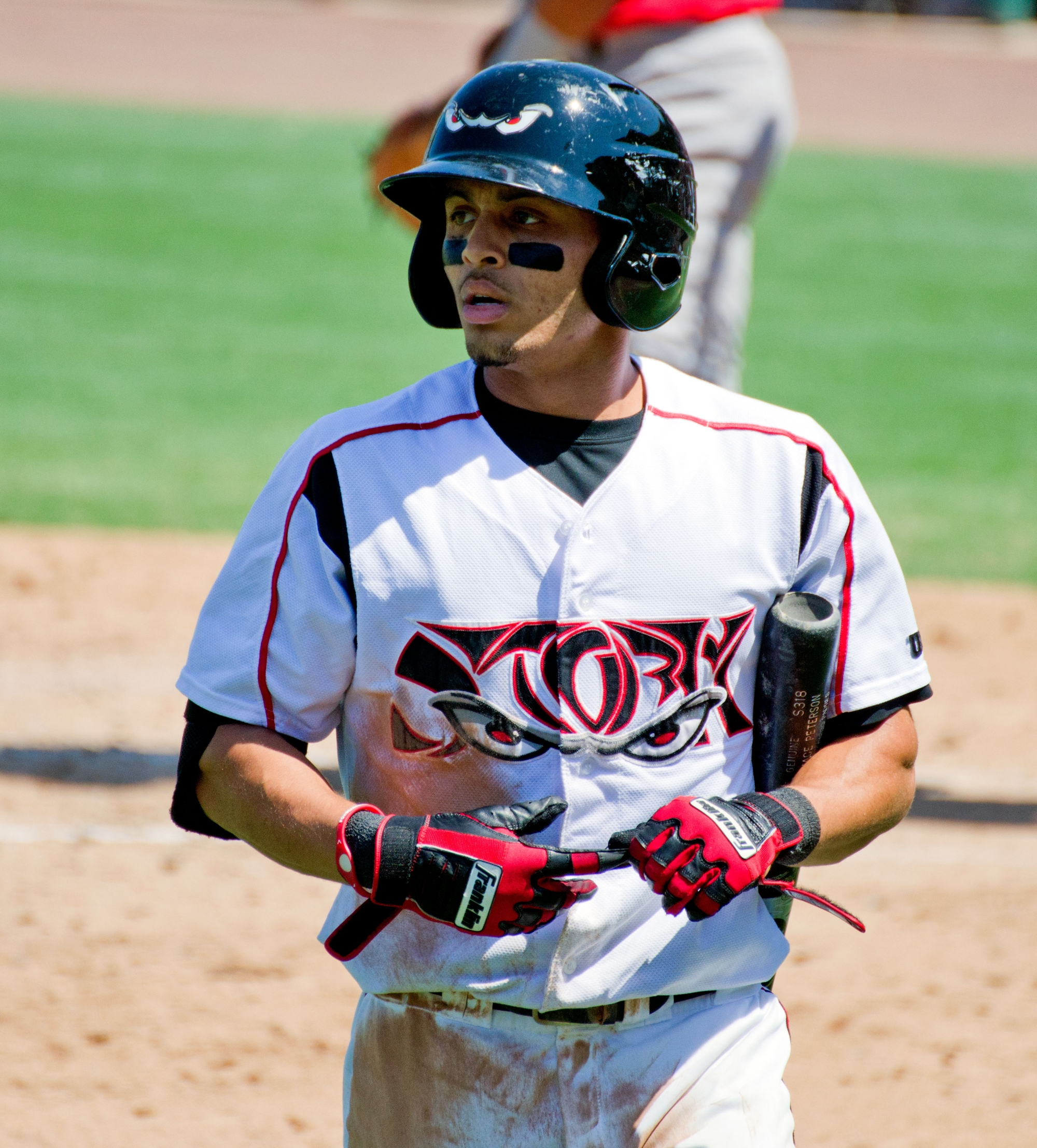
Noel with the Lake Elsinore Storm in 2012.

The San Diego Padres selected Noel in the fifth round of the 2010 MLB draft. Noel signed with the Padres, receiving a $163,000 signing bonus. In 2012, while playing for the Lake Elsinore Storm of the High–A California League, Noel recorded 90 stolen bases. Noel was named All-MiLB for May 2013. He began the 2015 season in Triple-A with the Padres, but asked for his release when he decided that to further his career, he needed to play for another organization.

=== New York Yankees ===
The Padres released Noel in July, and he signed with the Yankees. The Yankees assigned Noel to the Scranton/Wilkes-Barre RailRiders of Triple-A International League.

The Yankees promoted Noel to the major leagues on September 1, 2015. He made his major league debut as a defensive replacement on September 2. After the Yankees clinched a berth in the MLB postseason, Noel received his first plate appearance on October 3, and hit a single off of Baltimore Orioles' pitcher Oliver Drake. Noel was included on the Yankees' 25-man roster for the 2015 American League Wild Card Game. Noel stole five bases for the Yankees. The Yankees removed Noel from their 40-man roster over the offseason.

=== Los Angeles Dodgers ===
Noel signed a minor league contract with the Los Angeles Dodgers on December 23, 2015. He was given a non-roster invitation to Dodgers spring training. He played in 47 games with the Triple-A Oklahoma City Dodgers, hitting .230/.276/.302 with no home runs, 14 RBI, and 13 stolen bases. Noel elected free agency following the season on November 7, 2016.

=== Bravos de León ===
On March 9, 2017, Noel signed with the Lancaster Barnstormers of the Atlantic League of Professional Baseball. However, prior to the start of the season on April 23, he signed with the Bravos de León of the Mexican League. After hitting .250 with two home runs, five RBI, and five stolen bases across 10 games, Noel was released by the team on May 6.

=== Lancaster Barnstormers ===
Noel re–signed with the Lancaster Barnstormers of the Atlantic League of Professional Baseball on May 23, 2017. In 56 games for the Barnstormers, Noel slashed .261/.363/.358 with two home runs, 17 RBI, and 34 stolen bases.

=== Houston Astros ===
On August 1, 2017, Noel signed a minor league contract with the Houston Astros organization. He was assigned to the Corpus Christi Hooks of the Double–A Texas League. After 7 games for the Hooks, he was promoted to the Triple–A Fresno Grizzlies. In 18 games with Fresno, Noel batted .250/.292/.338 with two RBI and two stolen bases. Noel elected free agency following the season on November 6.

=== Lancaster Barnstormers (second stint) ===
On March 12, 2018, Noel signed with the Lancaster Barnstormers of the Atlantic League of Professional Baseball. In 87 games for the Barnstormers, he batted .305/.359/.393 with two home runs, 31 RBI, and 53 stolen bases. Noel became a free agent following the 2018 season.

=== Leones de Yucatán ===
On May 9, 2019, Noel signed with the Leones de Yucatán of the Mexican League. In 11 games for the Leones, he went 5–for–37 (.135) with 2 stolen bases. Noel was released by Yucatán on June 8.

=== Sugar Land Skeeters ===
On July 12, 2019, Noel signed with the Sugar Land Skeeters of the Atlantic League of Professional Baseball. In 52 games for the Skeeters, he slashed .284/.380/.345 with one home run, 15 RBI, and 45 stolen bases. Noel became a free agent following the season.

=== Sultanes de Monterrey ===
On April 18, 2022, Noel signed with the Sultanes de Monterrey of the Mexican League. He played in five games for the Sultanes, going 1–for–5 (.200) with one stolen base. Noel was released by Monterrey on May 11.

=== El Águila de Veracruz ===
On May 14, 2022, Noel signed with El Águila de Veracruz of the Mexican League. In 33 appearances for Veracruz, he batted .250/.346/.366 with two home runs, seven RBI, and eight stolen bases. Noel was released by the team on July 13.

== Personal life ==
Noel was born in Louisiana to Vincent and Mary Noel. His family moved to Oklahoma when he was in junior high school. Noel lives in Myrtle Beach, South Carolina, during the baseball offseason. Noel's younger brother, Orlandus, is seeking a heart transplant.
