= Zach Remillard =

American baseball player (born 1994)

Free agent
- Infielder
- Born: February 21, 1994 (age 32); Cohoes, New York, U.S.
- Bats: Right Throws: Right

MLB debut
- June 17, 2023, for the Chicago White Sox

MLB statistics (through 2024 season)
- Batting average: .250
- Home runs: 1
- Runs batted in: 19
- Stats at Baseball Reference

Teams
- Chicago White Sox (2023–2024)

Zachary Michael Remillard (born February 21, 1994) is an American professional baseball infielder who is a free agent. He has previously played in Major League Baseball (MLB) for the Chicago White Sox.

== Amateur career ==
Remillard grew up in Cohoes, New York, and attended the La Salle Institute in Troy, New York. As a senior, he batted .406 with 12 doubles, four home runs, 19 RBI and 21 stolen bases and was named the Albany Times Union Player of the Year. Remillard was selected in 38th round by the Houston Astros in 2012 Major League Baseball draft, but opted not to sign with the team.

Remillard attended Coastal Carolina University, where he played college baseball for the Coastal Carolina Chanticleers. He was a starter for four seasons. He tore his ulnar collateral ligament in his throwing elbow as a sophomore, but opted to play the rest of the season and wait until the summer to undergo Tommy John surgery. Remillard returned as a junior and hit .272 with six home runs, 12 doubles and 42 RBIs. Remillard led the Chanticleers with 19 home runs while batting .341 with 72 RBIs on the 2016 Coastal Carolina Chanticleers baseball team, which won the 2016 College World Series.

== Professional career ==
=== Chicago White Sox ===
The Chicago White Sox selected Remillard in the 10th round, with the 296th overall pick, of the 2016 Major League Baseball draft. After signing with the team, he was initially assigned to the Arizona League White Sox, where he batted .310 with two home runs and nine RBI before being promoted to the Kannapolis Intimidators of the Single–A South Atlantic League. Remillard also spent the 2017 season with Kannapolis, hitting .246 in 133 games with 27 doubles, two triples, seven home runs, and 50 RBI. He was assigned to the High-A Winston-Salem Dash and hit for a .250 average with 16 doubles, three triples, 11 homers, 52 RBI in 2018. He also started the following season with Winston-Salem before being promoted to the Birmingham Barons of the Double-A Southern League after hitting .289.

Remillard did not play in a game in 2020 due to the cancellation of the minor league season because of the COVID-19 pandemic. He returned to action in 2021 and spent the season split between Birmingham and the Triple–A Charlotte Knights. In 95 total games, Remillard hit .208/.311/.371 with a career–high 13 home runs, 30 RBI, and 14 stolen bases. In 2022, Remillard spent the year in Charlotte, playing in 131 games and batting .280/.373/.400 with 9 home runs, 52 RBI, and 19 stolen bases. He elected free agency following the season on November 10, 2022.

On January 26, 2023, Remillard re–signed with the White Sox organization on a minor league contract and was invited to spring training as a non–roster invitee. In 59 games for Triple–A Charlotte, he hit .236/.344/.354 with 5 home runs, 25 RBI, and 13 stolen bases. On June 15, Remillard was selected to the 40-man roster and promoted to the major leagues for the first time following an injury to Yoán Moncada. Remillard made his Major League debut on June 17 vs. the Seattle Mariners replacing Tim Anderson who was taken out of the game due to injury. Remillard helped the White Sox win when he hit a game tying RBI single in the top of the 9th and hit a go-ahead RBI single in the 11th to win the game for the White Sox 4-3. He went 3-for-3 with two RBI and a walk in his debut. In 54 games for Chicago, he batted .252/.295/.320 with one home run, 18 RBI, and 4 stolen bases.

On January 5, 2024, Remillard was designated for assignment following the signing of Martín Maldonado. He cleared waivers and was sent outright to Triple–A Charlotte on January 10. On April 12, the White Sox selected Remillard back to the major league roster. He appeared in two games for the club, going 1–for–5 (.200) with no home runs or RBI. On April 22, Remillard was designated for assignment following the promotion of Danny Mendick. He cleared waivers and was sent outright to Triple–A Charlotte on April 30. On May 8, the White Sox selected Remillard back to their active roster. After recording seven hits in 13 games, he was designated for assignment following the promotion of Duke Ellis on June 4. Remillard once more cleared waivers and was outrighted to Charlotte on June 6. He elected free agency on October 4.

=== Leones de Yucatán ===
On July 11, 2025, Remillard signed with the Leones de Yucatán of the Mexican League. He made 15 appearances for the Leones, batting .148/.258/.222 with no home runs, one RBI, and two stolen bases. Remillard was released by Yucatán on November 19.

== Personal life ==
Zach's older brother, Will, is a coach for the Cincinnati Reds.
