= Scott Berry =

American baseball coach

Biographical details
- Born: July 20, 1962 (age 64); Neosho, Missouri, U.S.
- Education: Southwest Missouri State '86

Playing career
- 1983–1984: Crowder
- Position: C

Coaching career (HC unless noted)
- 1985–1986: Southwest Missouri State (student asst.)
- 1991–1996: Meridian (asst.)
- 1997–2000: Meridian
- 2001–2009: Southern Miss (asst.)
- 2010–2023: Southern Miss

Head coaching record
- Overall: 500–265–1 (NCAA) 185–58 (NJCAA)
- Tournaments: NCAA: 15–17

Accomplishments and honors

Championships
- 5× C-USA (2011, 2013, 2017, 2018, 2022); 4× C-USA Tournament (2010, 2016, 2018, 2019); 2× NCAA Regional (2022, 2023); 1x Sun Belt Tournament (2023)

Awards
- 4× C-USA Coach of the Year (2011, 2017, 2018, 2022)

Scott Berry (born July 20, 1962) is an American baseball coach and former catcher who is the former head baseball coach of the Southern Miss Golden Eagles. He played college baseball at Crowder College from 1983 to 1984. He then served as the head coach of the Meridian Eagles (1997–2000).

== Playing career ==
Berry played two years at Crowder College, a junior college in Missouri. After two all-region seasons as a catcher, he was forced to give up baseball due to back issues. He transferred to Southwest Missouri State where he completed his degree and became a student assistant coach.

== Coaching career ==
In 1991, Berry was named an assistant at Meridian Community College, serving under Corky Palmer who would precede him at Southern Miss. After six seasons as an assistant, which included Meridian’s first-ever JUCO World Series appearance in 1993 in Grand Junction, Colorado, Berry became head coach at Meridian, where he remained for four seasons, earning numerous coach of the year awards. His teams were ranked in the top 10 all four years he was at the helm, and placed 25 players at Division I schools and coached nine future professional players.

Berry then rejoined Palmer with the Golden Eagles, accepting an assistant coaching position at Southern Miss. Berry worked in a number of roles, including hitting coach, pitching coach, and associate head coach prior to becoming head coach in 2010. While a hitting coach, the Golden Eagles hit over .300 as a team after batting .279 the previous season, with seven players batting over .300. As a pitching coach, USM posted the lowest ERA in Conference USA and produced four players who earned seven All-America awards, including one in four consecutive years. In 2009, the Golden Eagles made their first trip to the College World Series after defeating Florida in Gainesville in the super regional round. Berry ran USM's streak of NCAA appearances to nine with trips in 2010 and 2011, including a 2010 Conference USA baseball tournament title and a share of the 2011 regular season conference title.

== Head coaching record ==
Below is a table of Berry's yearly records as an NCAA head baseball coach.

Record table
Season	Team	Overall	Conference	Standing	Postseason
Meridian Community College (Records Not Available) (1997–2000)
1997	Meridian Community College	50–8			
1998	Meridian Community College	52–12			NJCAA World Series
1999	Meridian Community College	37–19			
2000	Meridian Community College	46–19			NJCAA World Series
Meridian Community College:		185–58			
Southern Miss Golden Eagles (Conference USA) (2010–2022)
2010	Southern Miss	36–24	14–10	2nd	NCAA Regional
2011	Southern Miss	39–19	16–8	T–1st	NCAA Regional
2012	Southern Miss	32–24	14–10	T–3rd	C-USA tournament
2013	Southern Miss	30–27	15–9	T–1st	C-USA tournament
2014	Southern Miss	35–25	19–11	3rd	C-USA tournament
2015	Southern Miss	36–18–1	19–10	3rd	C-USA tournament
2016	Southern Miss	41–19	20–10	3rd	NCAA Regional
2017	Southern Miss	50–16	25–5	1st	NCAA Regional
2018	Southern Miss	44–18	23–6	1st	NCAA Regional
2019	Southern Miss	40–21	20–10	2nd	NCAA Regional
2020	Southern Miss	12–4	0–0		Season canceled due to COVID-19
2021	Southern Miss	40–21	22–9	2nd (West)	NCAA Regional
2022	Southern Miss	47–19	23–7	1st	NCAA Super Regional
Southern Miss Golden Eagles (Sun Belt Conference) (2023)
2023	Southern Miss	46–20	22–8	2nd	NCAA Super Regional
Southern Miss:		528-276–1	252-113		
Total:		528–276–1			
National champion Postseason invitational champion Conference regular season champion Conference regular season and conference tournament champion Division regular season champion Division regular season and conference tournament champion Conference tournament champion

== See also ==
- List of current NCAA Division I baseball coaches
