= 2023 Coastal Carolina Chanticleers baseball team =

American college baseball season

2023 Coastal Carolina Chanticleers baseball

Sun Belt Conference Regular Season champions

Conway Regional, 3–2
- Conference: Sun Belt Conference

Ranking
- Coaches: No. 20
- CB: No. 21
- Record: 42–21 (23–7 SBC)
- Head coach: Gary Gilmore (28th season)
- Assistant coaches: Kevin Schnall (20th season); Jason Beverlin (2nd season); Matt Schilling (16th season)
- Home stadium: Springs Brooks Stadium

2023 Sun Belt Conference baseball standings
	Conf.				Overall
Team	W		L	PCT	W		L	PCT
No. 21 Coastal Carolina ‍†‍‍^{y}	23	–	7	.767	42	–	21	.667
No. 9 Southern Miss ‍‍‡‍^{y}	22	–	8	.733	46	–	20	.697
Troy ‍‍‍^{y}	18	–	12	.600	40	–	22	.645
Louisiana ‍‍‍^{y}	18	–	12	.600	41	–	24	.631
Texas State ‍‍‍	17	–	13	.567	36	–	23	.610
Appalachian State ‍‍‍	16	–	13	.552	30	–	25	.545
James Madison ‍‍‍	15	–	13	.536	31	–	25	.554
Georgia State ‍‍‍	16	–	14	.533	30	–	29	.508
Georgia Southern ‍‍‍	16	–	14	.533	27	–	29	.482
Old Dominion ‍‍‍	15	–	15	.500	32	–	23	.582
South Alabama ‍‍‍	11	–	19	.367	23	–	31	.426
Arkansas State ‍‍‍	9	–	19	.321	20	–	31	.392
Louisiana–Monroe ‍‍‍	6	–	23	.207	17	–	37	.315
Marshall ‍‍‍	5	–	25	.167	16	–	37	.302
† – Conference champion ‡ – Tournament champion y – Invited to the NCAA Tournament; As of June 25, 2023; Rankings from D1Baseball

The 2023 Coastal Carolina Chanticleers baseball team represented Coastal Carolina University during the 2023 NCAA Division I baseball season. The Chanticleers played their home games at Springs Brooks Stadium and were led by twenty-eight year head coach Gary Gilmore. They were members of the Sun Belt Conference.

== Personnel ==
2023 Coastal Carolina Chanticleers baseball team
Players
Coaches

#	Pos.	Name	B/T	Height	Weight	Year	Home town
1	OF	Sebastian Alexander	R/R	6 ft 1 in (1.85 m)	180 lb (82 kg)	Jr	Mayfield, Ohio
2	RHP	Jack Billings	L/R	5 ft 11 in (1.8 m)	240 lb (109 kg)	Sr	Voorhees, New Jersey
3	INF	Ty Dooley	L/R	5 ft 10 in (1.78 m)	170 lb (77 kg)	So	Elgin, South Carolina
5	INF	Payton Eeles	L/R	5 ft 7 in (1.7 m)	180 lb (82 kg)	Sr	Acworth, Georgia
6	OF	Nick Lucky	L/R	6 ft 0 in (1.83 m)	190 lb (86 kg)	Sr	Denver, Pennsylvania
7	INF	Blake Barthol	L/R	5 ft 9 in (1.75 m)	180 lb (82 kg)	Fr	Allentown, Pennsylvania
8	INF	Dean Mihos	R/R	5 ft 9 in (1.75 m)	155 lb (70 kg)	Fr	Chester Springs, Pennsylvania
10	OF	Billy Underwood	R/L	6 ft 1 in (1.85 m)	195 lb (88 kg)	Jr	St. Louis, Missouri
11	RHP	Teddy Sharkey	R/R	5 ft 11 in (1.8 m)	215 lb (98 kg)	Jr	Wall, New Jersey
12		Jake Books	L/R	6 ft 1 in (1.85 m)	200 lb (91 kg)	Fr	Royersford, Pennsylvania
13	RHP	John Kelly	R/R	5 ft 11 in (1.8 m)	190 lb (86 kg)	Sr	Rutherford, New Jersey
16	INF	Zack Beach	L/R	6 ft 4 in (1.93 m)	220 lb (100 kg)	Sr	Mechanicsville, Virginia
17	C	Caden Bodine	S/R	5 ft 10 in (1.78 m)	200 lb (91 kg)	Fr	Haddon Heights, New Jersey
18	OF	Chad Born (redshirt)	R/R	6 ft 1 in (1.85 m)	185 lb (84 kg)	So	Placentia, California
19	LHP	Liam Doyle	L/L	6 ft 2 in (1.88 m)	185 lb (84 kg)	Fr	Derry, New Hampshire
20	RHP	Alex Edmondson	R/R	6 ft 3 in (1.91 m)	200 lb (91 kg)	Jr	Simpsonville, South Carolina
21	OF	Houston Koon	S/R	6 ft 2 in (1.88 m)	195 lb (88 kg)	Jr	Wilkesboro, North Carolina
22	OF	Graham Brown	R/R	6 ft 0 in (1.83 m)	195 lb (88 kg)	Sr	Middletown, Maryland
23	OF	Anthony Galason (redshirt)	R/R	5 ft 7 in (1.7 m)	185 lb (84 kg)	Sr	Colts Neck, New Jersey
24	LHP	Levi Huesman	R/L	6 ft 0 in (1.83 m)	190 lb (86 kg)	Fr	Hanover, Virginia
25	INF	Orlando Pena	R/R	6 ft 0 in (1.83 m)	200 lb (91 kg)	So	Jersey City, New Jersey
26	RHP	Riley Eikhoff (redshirt)	R/R	5 ft 11 in (1.8 m)	185 lb (84 kg)	So	Bristow, Virginia
27	C	Tanner Garrison	R/R	6 ft 3 in (1.91 m)	205 lb (93 kg)	Sr	Elgin, South Carolina
29	RHP	Matthew Potok	R/R	6 ft 4 in (1.93 m)	240 lb (109 kg)	So	Jackson, New Jersey
30	RHP	Karl Ralamb	R/R	6 ft 3 in (1.91 m)	230 lb (104 kg)	Fr	Las Vegas, Nevada
31	RHP	Will Smith (redshirt)	R/R	6 ft 0 in (1.83 m)	200 lb (91 kg)	Jr	Conway, South Carolina
32	C	Kameron Guangorena (redshirt)	L/R	6 ft 0 in (1.83 m)	195 lb (88 kg)	Sr	Whittier, California
33	LHP	Tadan Bell	L/L	6 ft 2 in (1.88 m)	200 lb (91 kg)	Fr	Columbus, Nebraska
35	RHP	Bobby McBride	R/R	6 ft 2 in (1.88 m)	190 lb (86 kg)	Fr	Brewster, New York
36	INF	Chase Hudson (redshirt)	R/R	5 ft 10 in (1.78 m)	180 lb (82 kg)	Sr	Myrtle Beach, South Carolina
38	RHP	Josh McCusker	L/R	6 ft 1 in (1.85 m)	170 lb (77 kg)	Fr	Leesburg, Virginia
39	RHP	Darin Horn	R/R	6 ft 4 in (1.93 m)	180 lb (82 kg)	So	Bluffton, South Carolina
40	RHP	Davis Tyndall	R/R	6 ft 1 in (1.85 m)	180 lb (82 kg)	Sr	Morehead City, North Carolina
41	RHP	Colin Yablonski (redshirt)	R/R	6 ft 3 in (1.91 m)	195 lb (88 kg)	Jr	Lancaster, Pennsylvania
43	RHP	Matt Joyce	R/R	5 ft 10 in (1.78 m)	200 lb (91 kg)	Jr	Braintree, Massachusetts
44	RHP	Jake Manderson (redshirt)	R/R	6 ft 2 in (1.88 m)	195 lb (88 kg)	Jr	Ballston Spa, New York
45	RHP	Brodie McFadden	R/R	6 ft 1 in (1.85 m)	180 lb (82 kg)	Fr	Holly Springs, North Carolina
47	LHP	Bryce Shaffer	L/L	6 ft 2 in (1.88 m)	180 lb (82 kg)	Jr	Cape Coral, Florida
51	RHP	Jacob Morrison	R/R	6 ft 8 in (2.03 m)	240 lb (109 kg)	Fr	Flushing, Michigan
53		Derek Bender	R/R	6 ft 1 in (1.85 m)	210 lb (95 kg)	So	Murrells Inlet, South Carolina

Head coach

Garry Gilmore (Coastal Carolina)

Assistant coach(es)

Kevin Schnall (Coastal Carolina)
Jason Beverlin (Western Carolina)
Matt Schilling (Coastal Carolina)

Legend

- (C) Team captain
- (S) Suspended
- (I) Ineligible
- Injured
- Current redshirt

Roster
Last update: 25 June 2023

== Schedule and results ==
Legend
	Coastal Carolina win
	Coastal Carolina loss
	Postponement/Cancelation/Suspensions
**Bold**	Coastal Carolina team member

2023 Coastal Carolina Chanticleers baseball game log
Regular season

February (4–4)
Date	Opponent	Rank	Site/stadium	Score	Win	Loss	Save	TV	Attendance	Overall record	SBC record
Baseball at the Beach Presented by VisitMyrtleBeach.com
Feb. 17	Fairfield		Springs Brooks Stadium • Conway, SC	**W** 14–7	**Smith** (1–0)	Noviello (0–1)	None		1,772	1–0	
Feb. 18	Middle Tennessee		Springs Brooks Stadium • Conway, SC	**W** 11–3	**Morrisson** (1-0)	Swan (0-1)	**Schaffer** (1)	ESPN+	1,847	2–0	
Feb. 19	VCU		Springs Brooks Stadium • Conway, SC	**L** 2–4	Peters (1-0)	**Smith** (1-1)	Erka (1)		1,969	2–1	
Feb. 22	NC State		Springs Brooks Stadium • Conway, SC	**L** 4–16	Highfill (1-0)	**Eikhoff** (0-1)	None	ESPN+	2,413	2–2	
Feb. 24	Creighton		Springs Brooks Stadium • Conway, SC	**W** 14–12	**Billings** (1-0)	Hammond (1-1)	**Sharkey** (1)	ESPN+	1,423	3–2	
Feb. 25	Creighton		Springs Brooks Stadium • Conway, SC	**W** 14–5	**Shaffer** (1-0)	Lommel (0-1)	None	ESPN+	1,365	4–2	
Feb. 26	Creighton		Springs Brooks Stadium • Conway, SC	**L** 5–10	Bergstrom (1-0)	**Yablonski** (0-1)	None	ESPN+	1,412	4–3	
Feb. 28	at Charleston		CofC Baseball Stadium at Patriots Point • Mount Pleasant, SC	**L** 3–4	Privette (1-0)	**Edmondson** (0-1)	None	FloSports	667	4–4	

March (12–3)
Date	Opponent	Rank	Site/stadium	Score	Win	Loss	Save	TV	Attendance	Overall record	SBC record
Mar. 3	Davidson		Springs Brooks Stadium • Conway, SC	**W** 7–6	**Sharkey** (1-0)	Champey (1-1)	None	ESPN+	1,397	5–4	
Mar. 4	Davidson		Springs Brooks Stadium • Conway, SC	**W** 26–5	**Huesman** (1-0)	Feczko (1-2)	None	ESPN+	1,542	6–4	
Mar. 5	Davidson		Springs Brooks Stadium • Conway, SC	**W** 12–5	**Horn** (1-0)	Jamieson (1-1)	**Sharkey** (2)	ESPN+	1,738	7–4	
Mar. 7	No. 5 Wake Forest		Springs Brooks Stadium • Conway, SC	**W** 13–11	**Yablonski** (1-1)	Ray (0-1)	**Sharkey** (3)	ACC+	1,791	8–4	
Mar. 10	Illinois		Springs Brooks Stadium • Conway, SC	**W** 16–8	**Shaffer** (2-0)	Constertina (1-1)	None	ESPN+	1,313	9–4	
Mar. 11	Illinois		Springs Brooks Stadium • Conway, SC	**L** 3–13	Glassey (2-0)	**Huesmann** (1-1)	None	ESPN+	1,923	9–5	
Mar. 12	Illinois		Springs Brooks Stadium • Conway, SC	Game canceled due to heavy rain and inclement weather							
Mar. 14	No. 19 Campbell		Springs Brooks Stadium • Conway, SC	**W** 12–9	**Potok** (1-0)	Loyd (1-1)	**Sharkey** (4)	ESPN+	1,588	10–5	
Mar. 17	at James Madison		Eagle Field at Veterans Memorial Park • Harrisonburg, VA	**W** 16–3	**Morrison** (2-0)	Mozoki (0-2)	None	ESPN+	297	11–5	1–0
Mar. 18	at James Madison		Eagle Field at Veterans Memorial Park • Harrisonburg, VA	**L** 3–8	Murphy (3-1)	**Huesmann** (1-2)	None		379	11–6	1–1
Mar. 19	at James Madison		Eagle Field at Veterans Memorial Park • Harrisonburg, VA	**W** 3–1	**Sharkey** (2-0)	Grubbs (0-1)	None	ESPN+	291	12–6	2–1
Mar. 24	Texas State		Springs Brooks Stadium • Conway, SC	**W** 19–0	**Morrison** (3-0)	Wells (4-1)	None	ESPN+	2,167	13-6	3–1
Mar. 25	Texas State		Springs Brooks Stadium • Conway, SC	**W** 13–6	**Potok** (2-0)	Medrano (1-2)	None	ESPN+	2,004	14-6	4–1
Mar. 25	Texas State		Springs Brooks Stadium • Conway, SC	**L** 8–10	Stroud (1-1)	**Horn** (1-1)	McCaffety (2)	ESPN+	1,654	14–7	4–2
March 28	at No. 13 North Carolina	No. 19	Boshamer Stadium • Chapel Hill, NC	**W** 12-7	**Sharkey** (3–0)	Berkwich (1–1)	None	ACCNX	2,554	15–7	4–2
March 31	at Georgia State	No. 19	Georgia State Baseball Complex • Decatur, GA	**W** 16-7	**Shaffer** (3-0)	Brandon (2-2)	None		367	16–7	5–2

April (12–7)
Date	Opponent	Rank	Site/stadium	Score	Win	Loss	Save	TV	Attendance	Overall record	SBC record
Apr. 1	at Georgia State	No. 19	Georgia State Baseball Complex • Atlanta, GA	**W** 10–8	**Yablonski** (2-1)	Ottinger (0-4)	**Sharkey** (5)		389	17–7	6–2
Apr. 2	at Georgia State	No. 19	Georgia State Baseball Complex • Atlanta, GA	**W** 8–6^{10}	**Smith** (2-1)	Gorman (1-1)	None		401	18–7	7–2
Apr. 4	at Clemson	No. 17	Doug Kingsmore Stadium • Clemson, SC	**L** 7–16^{7}	Hoffmann (3-1)	**Huesman** (1-3)	None	ACCNX	4,678	18–8	
Apr. 6	Georgia Southern	No. 17	Springs Brooks Stadium • Conway, SC	**W** 10–4	**Morrison** (4-0)	Johnson (4-3)	**Horn** (1)	ESPN+	2,609	19–8	8–2
Apr. 7	Georgia Southern	No. 17	Springs Brooks Stadium • Conway, SC	**L** 5–7	Thompson (2-2)	**Potok** (2-1)	None	ESPN+	1,411	19–9	8–3
Apr. 7	Georgia Southern	No. 17	Springs Brooks Stadium • Conway, SC	**W** 13–8	**Shaffer** (4-1)	Wray (1-2)	None	ESPN+	1,759	20–9	9–3
Apr. 10	at No. 14 Campbell	No. 17	Jim Perry Stadium • Buies Creek, NC	**L** 4–9	Cummings (1-1)	**Huesman** (1-4)	None	ESPN+	876	20–10	
Apr. 11	at No. 14 Campbell	No. 17	Jim Perry Stadium • Buies Creek, NC	**W** 5–3	**Doyle** (1-0)	Loyd (2-4)	**Sharkey** (6)	ESPN+	730	21–10	
Apr. 14	at Old Dominion	No. 17	Bud Metheny Baseball Complex • Norfolk, VA	**L** 5–8	Holobetz (2-1)	**Potok** (2-2)	Cook (3)	ESPN+	680	21–11	9–4
Apr. 15	at Old Dominion	No. 17	Bud Metheny Baseball Complex • Norfolk, VA	**W** 15–2	**Morrison** (5-0)	Armstrong (6-1)	None	ESPN+	931	22–11	10–4
Apr. 16	at Old Dominion	No. 17	Bud Metheny Baseball Complex • Norfolk, VA	**W** 4–2	**Sharkey** (4-0)	Cook (2-2)	None	ESPN+	802	23–11	11–4
Apr. 19	Charleston	No. 10	Springs Brooks Stadium • Conway, SC	**W** 12–4	**Smith** (3-1)	Brink (2-1)	None	ESPN+	1,703	24–11	
Apr. 21	No. 24 Southern Miss	No. 10	Springs Brooks Stadium • Conway, SC	**W** 15–7	**Potok** (3-2)	Hall (7-3)	None	ESPN+	2,158	25–11	12–4
Apr. 22	No. 24 Southern Miss	No. 10	Springs Brooks Stadium • Conway, SC	**W** 20–7	**Horn** (2-1)	Oldham (3-2)	None	ESPN+	1,628	26–11	13–4
Apr. 23	No. 24 Southern Miss	No. 10	Springs Brooks Stadium • Conway, SC	**W** 7–15	Storm (2-1)	**Sharkey** (4-1)	None	ESPN+	2,207	26–12	13–5
Apr. 25	at No. 2 Wake Forest	No. 6	Springs Brooks Stadium • Conway, SC	**L** 1–11^{7}	Keener (6-0)	**Kelly** (0-1)	None	ACCN	2,361	26–13	
Apr. 28	at Louisiana	No. 6	M. L. Tigue Moore Field at Russo Park • Lafayette, LA	**L** 9–11	Theut (2-0)	**Potok** (3-3)	None	ESPN+	4,008	26–14	13–6
Apr. 29	at Louisiana	No. 6	M. L. Tigue Moore Field at Russo Park • Lafayette, LA	**W** 13–5	**Morrison** (6-0)	Nezuh (6-4)	**Doyle** (1)	ESPN+	4,029	27–14	14–6
Apr. 30	at Louisiana	No. 6	M. L. Tigue Moore Field at Russo Park • Lafayette, LA	**W** 3–2^{11}	**Sharkey** (5-1)	Moody (0-4)	None	ESPN+	3,925	28–14	15–6

May (9–3)
Date	Opponent	Rank	Site/stadium	Score	Win	Loss	Save	TV	Attendance	Overall record	SBC record
May 2	Charlotte	No. 8	Springs Brooks Stadium • Conway, SC	**L** 3–7	Kramer (3-4)	**Edmondson** (0-2)	None	ESPN+	1,519	28–15	
May 5	Appalachian State	No. 8	Springs Brooks Stadium • Conway, SC	**L** 0–11	Hamilton (8-2)	Morrison' (6-1)	None	ESPN+	2,085	28–16	15–7
May 6	Appalachian State	No. 8	Springs Brooks Stadium • Conway, SC	**W** 6–5^{10}	**Sharkey** (6-1)	Welch (2-2)	None	ESPN+	2,224	29–16	16–7
May 7	Appalachian State	No. 8	Springs Brooks Stadium • Conway, SC	**W** 11–4	**Horn** (3-1)	Cross (4-3)	None	ESPN+	2,171	30–16	17–7
May 9	at The Citadel	No. 8	Joseph P. Riley Jr. Park • Charleston, SC	Game cancelled'							
May 10	No. 16 Clemson	No. 8	Springs Brooks Stadium • Conway, SC	**L** 6–13	Allen (2-0)	**Shaffer** (4-1)	None	ESPN+	3,511	30–17	
May 12	at South Alabama	No. 8	Eddie Stanky Field • Mobile, AL	**W** 8–7^{10}	**Sharkey** (7-1)	Wood (4-3)	None	ESPN+	1,394	31–17	18–7
May 13	at South Alabama	No. 8	Eddie Stanky Field • Mobile, AL	**W** 14–11	**Smith** (4-1)	Lee (2-7)	None	ESPN+	1,401	32–17	19–7
May 14	at South Alabama	No. 8	Eddie Stanky Field • Mobile, AL	**W** 16–10	**Kelly** (1-1)	Homniok (1-2)	None	ESPN+	969	33–17	20–7
May 16	North Carolina	No. 8	Springs Brooks Stadium • Conway, SC	**W** 8–6	**Billings** (2-0)	Bovair (4-3)	**Sharkey** (7)	ESPN+	2,322	34–17	
May 18	Marshall	No. 8	Springs Brooks Stadium • Conway, SC	Game postponed							
May 19	Marshall	No. 8	Springs Brooks Stadium • Conway, SC	**W** 9–3	**Doyle** (2-0)	Copen (2-9)	None	ESPN+	1,681	35–17	21–7
May 20	Marshall	No. 8	Springs Brooks Stadium • Conway, SC	**W** 19–2	**Eikhoff** (1-1)	Pacella (0-8)	None	ESPN+	2,005	36–17	22–7
May 20	Marshall	No. 8	Springs Brooks Stadium • Conway, SC	**W** 10–9	**Billings** (3-0)	Addkison (3-8)	**Sharkey** (8)	ESPN+	2,005	37–17	23–7

Postseason (5–4)

SBC Tournament (2–2)
Date	Opponent	(Seed)/Rank	Site/stadium	Score	Win	Loss	Save	TV	Attendance	Overall record	Tournament record
May 24	vs. (8) Georgia State	(1)/No. 7	Montgomery Riverwalk Stadium • Montgomery, AL	**W** 5–4	**Doyle** (3-0)	Acosta (3-3)	**Sharkey** (9)	ESPN+		38–17	1–0
May 25	vs. (4) Louisiana	(1)/No. 7	Montgomery Riverwalk Stadium • Montgomery, AL	**W** 6–3	**Eikhoff** (2-1)	Fluno (3-1)	**Sharkey** (10)	ESPN+		39–17	2–0
May 27	vs. Louisiana	(1)/No. 7	Montgomery Riverwalk Stadium • Montgomery, AL	**L** 3–7	Couch (2-1)	**Horn** (3-2)	Marshall (5)	ESPN+		39–18	2–1
May 27	vs. (4) Louisiana	(1)/No. 7	Montgomery Riverwalk Stadium • Montgomery, AL	**L** 1–4	Marshall (3-1)	**Smith** (4-2)	Etheridge (2)	ESPN+		39–19	2–2

NCAA tournament (3–2)
Date	Opponent	(Seed)/Rank	Site/stadium	Score	Win	Loss	Save	TV	Attendance	Overall record	Tournament record
Conway Regional
Jun. 2	(4) Rider	(1)/No. 9	Springs Brooks Stadium • Conway, SC	**L** 10–11^{10}	Kirwin (7-2)	**Sharkey** (7-2)	None	ESPN+	3,593	39–20	0–1
Jun. 3	(3) UNC Wilmington	(1)/No. 9	Springs Brooks Stadium • Conway, SC	**W** 12–2	**Eikhoff** (3-1)	Taylor (7-3)	None	ESPN+	3,241	40–20	1–1
Jun. 4	(4) Rider	(1)/No. 9	Springs Brooks Stadium • Conway, SC	**W** 13–5	**Billings** (4-0)	Heine (4-4)	None	ESPN+	3,291	41–20	2–1
Jun. 4	(2) Duke	(1)/No. 9	Springs Brooks Stadium • Conway, SC	**W** 8–6	**Shaffer** (5-1)	Proksch (5-3)	**Sharkey** (11)	ESPN+	4,001	42–20	3–1
Jun. 5	(2) Duke	(1)/No. 9	Springs Brooks Stadium • Conway, SC	**L** 3–12	Beilenson (6-3)	**Doyle** (3-1)	None	ESPN+	5,102	42–21	3–2

Schedule source:

*Rankings are based on the team's current ranking in the D1Baseball poll.

== Conway Regional ==
Conway Regional Teams
(1) Coastal Carolina Chanticleers	(2) Duke Blue Devils	(3) UNC Wilmington Seahawks	(4) Rider Broncs

First Round
1	No. 9 Coastal Carolina	10
4	Rider	11^{10}
3	UNC Wilmington	3
2	Duke	12
Lower round 1
1	No. 9 Coastal Carolina	12
3	UNC Wilmington	2

Semi-Finals
4	Rider	1
2	Duke	2
Lower final
1	No. 9 Coastal Carolina	13
4	Rider	5

Finals
2	Duke	6	12
1	No. 9 Coastal Carolina	8	3

== Rankings ==
Ranking movements Legend: ██ Increase in ranking ██ Decrease in ranking
	Week																		
Poll	Pre	1	2	3	4	5	6	7	8	9	10	11	12	13	14	15	16	17	Final
Coaches'		*						21	21	13	7	8	9	8	7	8	8	8	20
Baseball America								22	18	8	7	7	8	8	8	8	12	12	20
Collegiate Baseball^								27	29	29	28	19	18	13	11	12	21	21	21
NCBWA†							28	20	18	13	9	8	10	8	8	9	21	21	24
D1Baseball							19	17	17	10	6	8	8	8	7	9	9	9	21

^ Collegiate Baseball ranked 40 teams in their preseason poll, but only ranked 30 teams weekly during the season.
† NCBWA ranks 30 teams in their preseason poll, but only ranks 25 teams weekly during the season.
* A new poll was not released for this week, so for comparison purposes, the previous week's ranking is inserted in this week's slot.
