= Mike Costanzo =

American baseball player (born 1983)

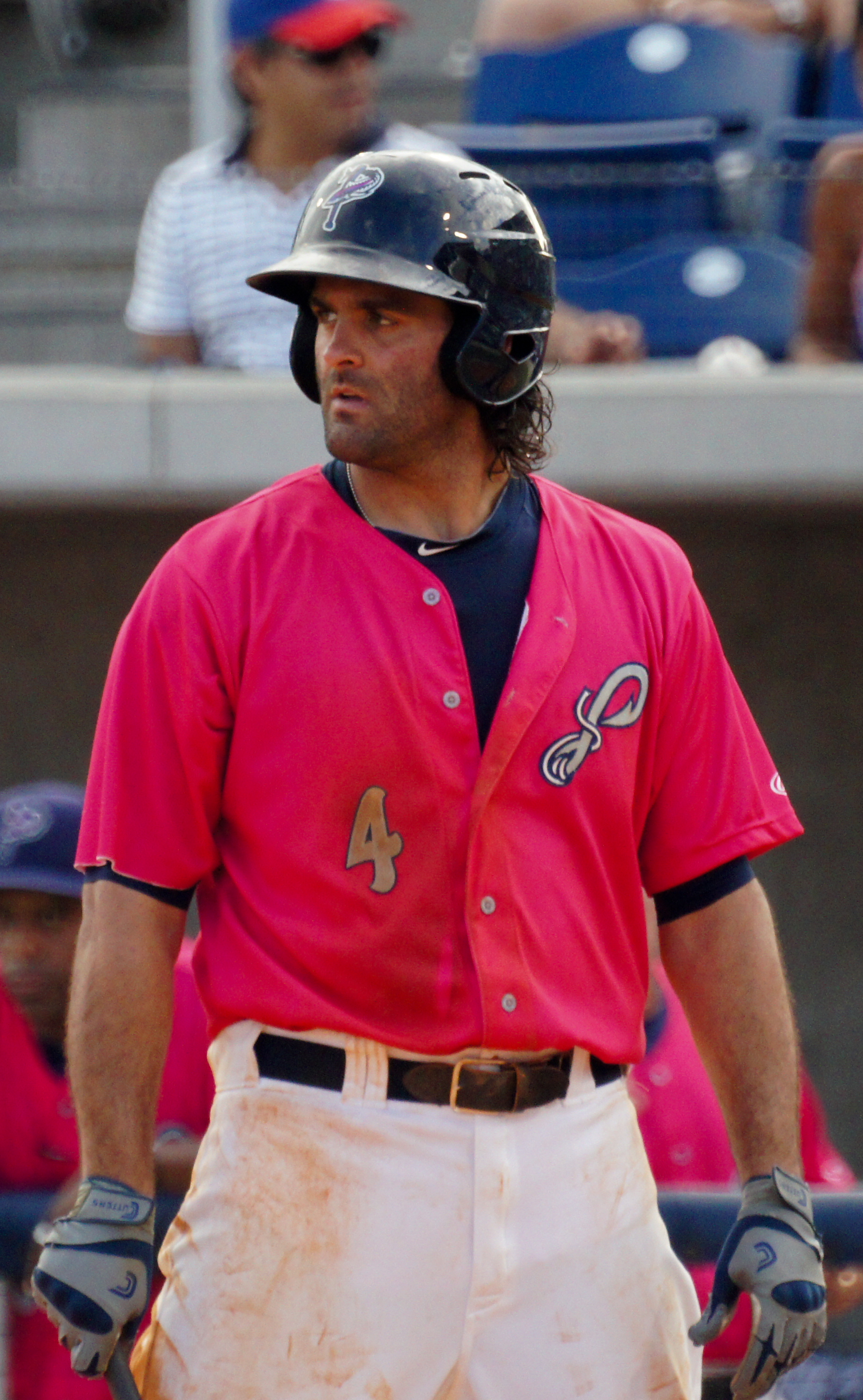
- Costanzo with the Pensacola Blue Wahoos in 2013
- Third baseman
- Born: September 9, 1983 (age 42); Philadelphia, Pennsylvania, U.S.
- Batted: Left Threw: Right

MLB debut
- May 13, 2012, for the Cincinnati Reds

Last appearance
- June 5, 2012, for the Cincinnati Reds

MLB statistics
- Batting average: .143
- Hits: 1
- Runs batted in: 2
- Stats at Baseball Reference

Teams
- Cincinnati Reds (2012)

Michael A. Costanzo (born September 9, 1983) is an American former professional baseball third baseman. He played in Major League Baseball (MLB) for the Cincinnati Reds.

== Amateur career ==
Costanzo played college baseball for Coastal Carolina University, and was named an All-American in his junior year. In 2003, he played collegiate summer baseball with the Bethesda Big Train of the Cal Ripken Collegiate Baseball League and was the team's MVP. In 2004, he played collegiate summer baseball with the Hyannis Mets of the Cape Cod Baseball League.

== Professional career ==
=== Philadelphia Phillies ===
Costanzo was drafted by the Philadelphia Phillies pick #65 in the second round of the 2005 Major League Baseball draft. In 2005, Costanzo reported to Low-A with the Batavia Muckdogs. In 2006, Costanzo spent the season in High-A with the Clearwater Threshers, where he is named Florida State League's Top defensive 3rd baseman.

In 2007, Costanzo was promoted to the Double-A Reading Fightin Phils in the Eastern League and logged 27 home runs with 86 RBI; he was also selected to the Eastern League All-Star game. Following the year, Costanzo was selected to play in the Arizona Fall League for top prospects.

=== Baltimore Orioles ===
On November 7, 2007, Costanzo, along with Michael Bourn and Geoff Geary, was traded to the Houston Astros in exchange for Brad Lidge and Eric Bruntlett. On December 12, he was traded for the second time in 34 days to the Baltimore Orioles along with Luke Scott, Matt Albers, Troy Patton, and Dennis Sarfate in exchange for Miguel Tejada. Costanzo made 129 appearances for the Triple-A Norfolk Tides in 2008, batting .261/.333/.395 with 11 home runs and 63 RBI.

Costanzo split the 2009 season between Norfolk and the Double-A Bowie Baysox, slashing a cumulative .202/.304/.316 with three home runs and 37 RBI across 82 total games. Costanzo was released by the Orioles organization on April 2, 2010.

=== Cincinnati Reds ===
Costanzo signed with the Cincinnati Reds on May 13, 2010.

Costanzo is called up to the majors with the Cincinnati Reds for the first time on May 12, 2012. In his first Major League at bat, he hit a sacrifice fly to left field, which scored Ryan Hanigan from third base. On May 19, Costanzo got his first Major League Hit off of New York Yankees pitcher Iván Nova. Yankees shortstop Derek Jeter retrieved the baseball and tossed it into the Reds dugout. On June 6, he was optioned back to the Triple-A Louisville Bats. On August 1, Costanzo was designated for assignment by Cincinnati.

Costanzo was inducted into the Coastal Carolina University Hall of Fame in fall of 2012.

=== Later career ===
On December 28, 2012, he signed a minor league deal with the Washington Nationals. Costanzo was released by the Nationals in June 2013 and was signed by the Cincinnati Reds.

Costanzo represented Team Italy in the 2009 and 2013 World Baseball Classic.

After spending all of 2014 with the Cincinnati Reds' Triple-A affiliate, the Louisville Bats, Costanzo signed with the Camden Riversharks of the Atlantic League of Professional Baseball in the following offseason. It was his second stint with the Camden Riversharks; he also played with the team during the 2010 season.

== Personal ==
Costanzo currently owns The Mike Costanzo Farmers Insurance Agency in Springfield, Pennsylvania.
