= Diocese of Valença =

Catholic ecclesiastical territory

Diocese of Valença Dioecesis Valentinus in Brasilia

Catholic
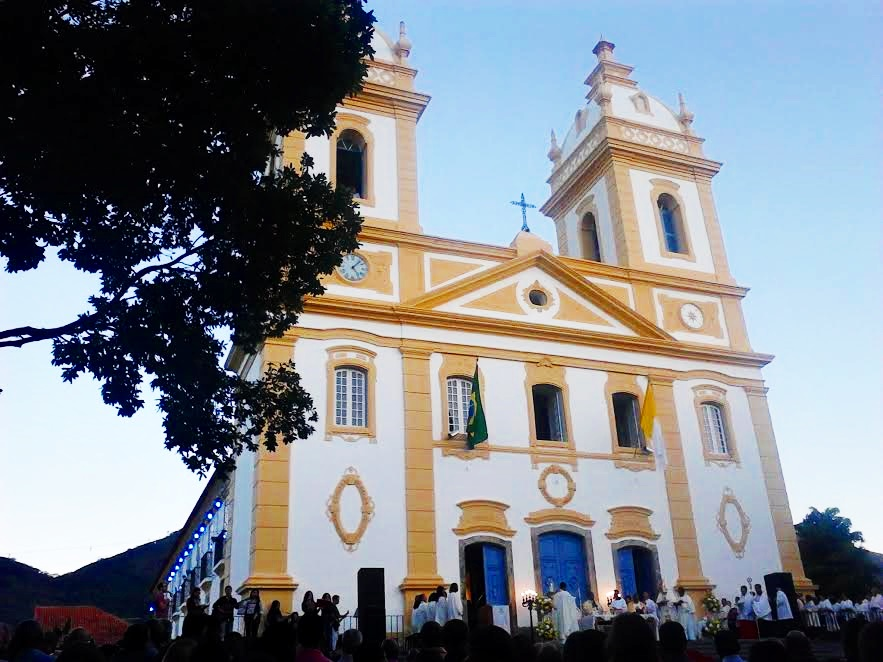
- Catedral Nossa Senhora da Glória in 2017

Location
- Country: Brazil
- Ecclesiastical province: São Sebastião do Rio de Janeiro

Statistics
- Area: 3,996 km^{2} (1,543 sq mi)
- Population: Total; Catholics: (as of 2004); 330,358; 247,550 (74.9%)

Information
- Rite: Latin Rite
- Established: 27 March 1925 (101 years ago)
- Cathedral: Catedral Nossa Senhora da Glória

Current leadership
- Pope: Leo XIV
- Bishop: Nelson Francelino Ferreira
- Metropolitan Archbishop: Orani João Tempesta, O. Cist.

Website
- www.diocesedevalenca.org

The Roman Catholic Diocese of Valença (Latin: Dioecesis Valentinus in Brasilia) is a diocese located in the city of Valença, Rio de Janeiro, in the ecclesiastical province of São Sebastião do Rio de Janeiro in Brazil.

== History ==
- 27 March 1925: Established as Diocese of Valença from the Diocese of Barra do Piraí

== Bishops ==
- Bishops of Valença (Roman rite), in reverse chronological order
  - Bishop Nelson Francelino Ferreira (2014.02.12 - present)
  - Bishop Elias James Manning, O.F.M. Conv. (1990.03.14 – 2014.02.12)
  - Bishop Amaury Castanho (1979.11.30 – 1989.05.03), appointed Coadjutor Bishop of Jundiaí, São Paulo
  - Bishop José Costa Campos (1960.12.09 – 1979.03.26), appointed Bishop of Divinópolis, Minas Gerais
  - Bishop Rodolfo das Mercés de Oliveira Pena (1942.01.03 – 1960.12.09)
  - Bishop René de Pontes (1938.10.13 – 1940.04.02)
  - Bishop André Arcoverde de Albuquerque Cavalcanti (1925.05.01 – 1936.08.08), appointed Bishop of Taubaté, São Paulo

=== Other priest of this diocese who became bishop ===
- Paulo Cezar Costa, appointed Auxiliary Bishop of São Sebastião do Rio de Janeiro in 2010
