= 2020 Vanderbilt Commodores baseball team =

American college baseball season

2020 Vanderbilt Commodores baseball
- Conference: Southeastern Conference
- Eastern Division

Ranking
- Coaches: No. 7
- CB: No. 5
- Record: 13–5 (0–0 SEC)
- Head coach: Tim Corbin (18th season)
- Assistant coaches: Mike Baxter; Scott Brown
- Home stadium: Hawkins Field

2020 Southeastern Conference baseball standings
	Conf.				Overall
Team	W		L	PCT	W		L	PCT
Eastern
No. 1 Florida ‍‍‍	0	–	0	–	16	–	1	.941
Tennessee ‍‍‍	0	–	0	–	15	–	2	.882
No. 3 Georgia ‍‍‍	0	–	0	–	14	–	4	.778
South Carolina ‍‍‍	0	–	0	–	12	–	4	.750
No. 6 Vanderbilt ‍‍‍	0	–	0	–	13	–	5	.722
Missouri • ‍‍‍	0	–	0	–	11	–	5	.688
Kentucky ‍‍‍	0	–	0	–	11	–	6	.647
Western
No. 8 Ole Miss ‍‍‍	0	–	0	–	16	–	1	.941
Alabama ‍‍‍	0	–	0	–	16	–	1	.941
Texas A&M ‍‍‍	0	–	0	–	15	–	3	.833
No. 17 Mississippi State ‍‍‍	0	–	0	–	12	–	4	.750
No. 18 Auburn ‍‍‍	0	–	0	–	13	–	5	.722
No. 19 LSU ‍‍‍	0	–	0	–	12	–	5	.706
No. 14 Arkansas ‍‍‍	0	–	0	–	11	–	5	.688
‡ – Tournament champion – ineligible for postseason due to NCAA sanctions As of March 12, 2020; Rankings from D1Baseball

The 2020 Vanderbilt Commodores baseball team represented Vanderbilt University in the 2020 NCAA Division I baseball season. Vanderbilt competed in the Eastern Division of the Southeastern Conference (SEC). The Commodores played their home games at Hawkins Field. Coach Tim Corbin led the Commodores in his 18th season with the program.

Vanderbilt began the 2020 season with high hopes, having secured the second highest-rated recruit class for the season. In addition, the Commodores were highly ranked in preseason and subsequent polls, beginning at #1 according to the preseason ESPN/USA Today Coaches poll and closing at #7 on March 16, the final ranking.

Due to the COVID-19 pandemic, the future of the 2020 college baseball season, and the seasons of all spring sports, became unclear. On March 12, Vanderbilt University declared that all spring sports were suspended for the remainder of the season. On March 30, the NCAA canceled the upcoming College World Series, but announced that senior spring athletes would have the opportunity to return to school for the 2021 spring season if they wished.

== Previous season ==
The Commodores finished 59–12 overall, and 23–7 in the conference. The Commodores were National champions in 2019.

== Personnel ==
=== Roster ===
2020 Vanderbilt Commodores roster
Pitchers: 21 – Tyler Brown – Junior; 22 – Jack Leiter – Freshman; 27 – Ethan Smith – Sophomore; 29 – Nick Maldonado – Freshman; 32 – Hugh Fisher – Junior; 33 – Erik Kaiser – Junior; 35 – Chris McElvain – Freshman; 39 – Jake Eder – Junior; 40 – Sam Hliboki – Freshman; 43 – Michael Doolin – Freshman; 44 – Mason Hickman – Junior; 45 – Chance Huff – Sophomore; 49 – Ryan Keenan – Freshman; 50 – Luke Murphy – (redshirt) Freshman; 66 – Thomas Schultz – Freshman; 80 – Kumar Rocker – Sophomore	Catchers: 5 – CJ Rodriguez – Freshman; 20 – Ty Duvall – Senior; 55 – Maxwell Romero Jr. – Freshman; Infielders: 2 – Harrison Ray – Senior; 9 – Carter Young – Freshman; 25 – Parker Noland – Freshman; 30 – Sterling Hayes – Sophomore; 99 – Jayson Gonzalez – Junior	Outfielders: 3 – Cooper Davis – Junior; 6 – Tate Kolwyck – Sophomore; 8 – Isaiah Thomas – Sophomore; 11 – Matt Hogan – Sophomore; 19 – Troy LaNeve – Freshman; Utility: 10 – T.J. McKenzie – Freshman; 12 – Dominic Keegan – Sophomore; 16 – Austin Martin – Junior; 18 – Will Duff – Freshman; 34 – Spencer Jones – Freshman; 42 – Justyn-Henry Malloy – Sophomore

=== Coaching staff ===
2020 Vanderbilt Commodores coaching staff
Name	Position	Seasons at Vanderbilt	Alma mater
Tim Corbin	Head coach	18	Ohio Wesleyan (1984)
Scott Brown	Associate head coach	8	Cortland (1999)
Mike Baxter	Assistant Coach	3	Vanderbilt (2006)
David Macias	Volunteer Coach	3	Vanderbilt (2008)

== Schedule and results ==
Legend
	Vanderbilt win
	Vanderbilt loss
	Cancellation
**Bold**	Vanderbilt team member

2020 Vanderbilt Commodores baseball game log
Regular season (13–5)

February
Date	Opponent	Rank (CB)	Site/stadium	Score	Win	Loss	Save	TV	Attendance	Overall record	SEC record
February 14	vs. No. 13 Michigan	No. 2	Salt River Fields at Talking Stick; Scottsdale, AZ	**L** 3–4	B. Keizer (1–0)	**T. Brown (0–1)**	I. Paige (1)		4,500	0–1	
February 15	vs. UConn	No. 2	Salt River Fields at Talking Stick	**W** 6–1	**K. Rocker (1–0)**	E. Stock (0–1)	**S. Hliboki (1)**		612	1–1	
February 16	vs. Cal Poly	No. 2	Salt River Fields at Talking Stick	**L** 8–9	D. Nelson (1–0)	**T. Brown (0–2)**			745	1–2	
February 18	South Alabama	No. 5	Hawkins Field; Nashville, TN	**W** 3–0	**J. Leiter (1–0)**	M. Boswell (0–1)	**T. Schultz (1)**		3,033	2–2	
February 19	South Alabama	No. 5	Hawkins Field	**W** 4–0	**E. Smith (1–0)**	C. Yarborough (0–1)	**M. Doolin (1)**		3,058	3–2	
February 21	UIC	No. 5	Hawkins Field	**W** 9–0	**M. Hickman (1–0)**	J. Key (0–2)			3,146	4–2	
February 22	UIC	No. 5	Hawkins Field	**W** 9–3	**K. Rocker (2–0)**	N. Oliff (0–2)			3,381	5–2	
February 23	UIC	No. 5	Hawkins Field	**W** 5–2	**J. Eder (1–0)**	B. Nicholson (0–2)	**T. Brown (1)**		3,208	6–2	
February 25	Evansville	No. 5	Hawkins Field	**W** 6–0	**J. Leiter** (2–0)	J. Meyer (0–1)			3,013	7–2	
February 26	Saint Louis	No. 5	Hawkins Field	**W** 10–2	**E. Smith (2–0)**	S. Youngbrandt (0–1)			3,012	8–2	
February 28	Hawaii	No. 5	Hawkins Field	**W** 5–1	**M. Hickman (2–0)**	L. Pouelsen			3,198	9–2	
February 29	Hawaii	No. 5	Hawkins Field	**L** 1–3	A. Davenport (3–0)	**T. Schultz**	C. Loewen (1)		3,295	9–3	

March
Date	Opponent	Rank (CB)	Site/stadium	Score	Win	Loss	Save	TV	Attendance	Overall record	SEC record
March 1	Hawaii	No. 5	Hawkins Field	**W** 7–5 (11)	**E. Kaiser (1–0)**	C. Loewen (0–1)			3,447	10–3	
March 3	Central Arkansas	No. 5	Hawkins Field	**W** 10–2	**M. Doolin (1–0)**	L. Gilbertson (1–2)			3,182	11–3	
March 6	at No. 1 UCLA	No. 5	Jackie Robinson Stadium; Los Angeles, CA	**L** 2–3	Z. Pettway (3–0)	**K. Rocker (2–1)**	H. Powell (3)		2,215	11–4	
March 7	at USC	No. 5	Dedeaux Field; Los Angeles, CA	**L** 1–2	J. Beller (3–0)	**J. Eder (1–1)**	B. Wanger (3)		1,507	11–5	
March 8	vs. No. 18 TCU	No. 5	Dedeaux Field	**W** 4–3	**T. Brown (1–2)**	D. Hill (2–1)			711	12–5	
March 11	Toledo	No. 7	Hawkins Field	**W** 11–2	**E. Smith (3–0)**	B. Todorowski (0–1)			3,015	13–5	
March 13	Kentucky	No. 7	Hawkins Field	**Canceled**							
March 14	Kentucky	No. 7	Hawkins Field	**Canceled**							
March 15	Kentucky	No. 7	Hawkins Field	**Canceled**							
March 17	vs. Belmont		First Horizon Park; Nashville, TN	**Canceled**							
March 20	at Tennessee		Lindsey Nelson Stadium; Knoxville, TN	**Canceled**							
March 21	at Tennessee		Lindsey Nelson Stadium	**Canceled**							
March 22	at Tennessee		Lindsey Nelson Stadium	**Canceled**							
March 24	vs. Lipscomb		First Horizon Park	**Canceled**							
March 27	Georgia		Hawkins Field	**Canceled**							
March 28	Georgia		Hawkins Field	**Canceled**							
March 29	Georgia		Hawkins Field	**Canceled**							
March 31	Tennessee Tech		Hawkins Field	**Canceled**							

April
Date	Opponent	Rank (CB)	Site/stadium	Score	Win	Loss	Save	TV	Attendance	Overall record	SEC record
April 2	at LSU		Alex Box Stadium; Baton Rouge, LA	Canceled							
April 3	at LSU		Alex Box Stadium	Canceled							
April 4	at LSU		Alex Box Stadium	Canceled							
April 7	Western Kentucky		Hawkins Field	Canceled							
April 10	South Carolina		Hawkins Field	Canceled							
April 11	South Carolina		Hawkins Field	Canceled							
April 12	South Carolina		Hawkins Field	Canceled							
April 14	Indiana State		Hawkins Field	Canceled							
April 17	at Ole Miss		Swayze Field; Oxford, MS	Canceled							
April 18	at Ole Miss		Swayze Field	Canceled							
April 19	at Ole Miss		Swayze Field	Canceled							
April 24	Alabama		Hawkins Field	Canceled							
April 25	Alabama		Hawkins Field	Canceled							
April 26	Alabama		Hawkins Field	Canceled							
April 28	Austin Peay		Hawkins Field	Canceled							

May
Date	Opponent	Rank (CB)	Site/stadium	Score	Win	Loss	Save	TV	Attendance	Overall record	SEC record
May 1	at Missouri		Taylor Stadium; Columbia, MO	Canceled							
May 2	at Missouri		Taylor Stadium	Canceled							
May 3	at Missouri		Taylor Stadium	Canceled							
May 5	Louisville		Hawkins Field	Canceled							
May 7	at Florida		Alfred A. McKethan Stadium; Gainesville, FL	Canceled							
May 8	at Florida		Alfred A. McKethan Stadium	Canceled							
May 9	at Florida		Alfred A. McKethan Stadium	Canceled							
May 12	Middle Tennessee		Hawkins Field	Canceled							
May 14	Mississippi State		Hawkins Field	Canceled							
May 15	Mississippi State		Hawkins Field	Canceled							
May 16	Mississippi State		Hawkins Field	Canceled							

Postseason

SEC Tournament
Date	Opponent	Seed	Site/stadium	Score	Win	Loss	Save	TV	Attendance	Overall record	SECT Record
May 19–24			Hoover Metropolitan Stadium; Hoover, AL								

Legend: = Win = Loss = Canceled
Bold = Vanderbilt team member

Schedule source:

*Rankings are based on the team's current ranking in the D1Baseball poll.

== 2020 MLB draft ==
Player	Position	Round	Overall	MLB team
Austin Martin	SS	1	5	Toronto Blue Jays
Tyler Brown	RHP	3	101	Houston Astros
Jake Eder	LHP	4	104	Miami Marlins
Mason Hickman	RHP	5	154	Cleveland Indians
