= 2020 Texas A&M Aggies baseball team =

American college baseball season

2020 Texas A&M Aggies baseball
- Conference: Southeastern Conference
- Western Division
- Record: 3–0 (0–0 SEC)
- Head coach: Rob Childress (15th season)
- Assistant coaches: Chad Caillet; Justin Seely
- Home stadium: Olsen Field at Blue Bell Park

2020 Southeastern Conference baseball standings
	Conf.				Overall
Team	W		L	PCT	W		L	PCT
Eastern
No. 1 Florida ‍‍‍	0	–	0	–	16	–	1	.941
Tennessee ‍‍‍	0	–	0	–	15	–	2	.882
No. 3 Georgia ‍‍‍	0	–	0	–	14	–	4	.778
South Carolina ‍‍‍	0	–	0	–	12	–	4	.750
No. 6 Vanderbilt ‍‍‍	0	–	0	–	13	–	5	.722
Missouri • ‍‍‍	0	–	0	–	11	–	5	.688
Kentucky ‍‍‍	0	–	0	–	11	–	6	.647
Western
No. 8 Ole Miss ‍‍‍	0	–	0	–	16	–	1	.941
Alabama ‍‍‍	0	–	0	–	16	–	1	.941
Texas A&M ‍‍‍	0	–	0	–	15	–	3	.833
No. 17 Mississippi State ‍‍‍	0	–	0	–	12	–	4	.750
No. 18 Auburn ‍‍‍	0	–	0	–	13	–	5	.722
No. 19 LSU ‍‍‍	0	–	0	–	12	–	5	.706
No. 14 Arkansas ‍‍‍	0	–	0	–	11	–	5	.688
‡ – Tournament champion – ineligible for postseason due to NCAA sanctions As of March 12, 2020; Rankings from D1Baseball

The 2020 Texas A&M Aggies baseball team represented Texas A&M University in the 2020 NCAA Division I baseball season. The Aggies played their home games at Olsen Field at Blue Bell Park.

== Previous season ==
The Aggies finished 39–23–1 overall, and 16–13–1 in the conference.

== Personnel ==
=== Roster ===
2020 Texas A&M Aggies roster
Pitchers: 12 - Joseph Menefee - Sophomore; 14 - Cam Wynne - Junior; 18 - Chandler Jozwiak - Junior; 20 - Blake Mayfield - Freshman; 21 - Jonathan Childress - (redshirt) Freshman; 23 - Christian Roa - Junior; 31 - Evan Vanek - Freshman; 32 - Bryce Miller - Junior; 35 - Asa Lacy - Junior; 37 - Dustin Saenz - Junior; 38 - Chris Weber - Sophomore; 42 - Jake Nelson - Senior; 43 - Dawson Barr - Sophomore; 53 - Alex Magers - Freshman	Catchers: 10 - Hunter Coleman - Senior; 41 - Brandon Ashy - Senior; 44 - Mikey Hoehner - Senior; Infielders: 1 - Ty Coleman - Sophomore; 4 - Hunter Watson - Sophomore; 5 - Izzy Lopez - Freshman; 8 - Logan Sartori - Junior; 11 - Austin Bost - Sophomore; 15 - Bryce Blaum - Junior; 50 - Will Frizzell - Junior	Outfielders: 0 - Ray Alejo - Senior; 3 - Logan Britt - Freshman; 9 - Zach DeLoach - Junior; 30 - Cam Blake - Senior; Utility: 2 - Rody Barker (C/INF) - Junior; 13 - Zane Schmidt (OF/1B) - Sophomore; 17 - Colson Geisler (P/OF) - Sophomore; 22 - Will Johnston (OF/P) - Freshman; 28 - Trevor Werner (INF/P) - Freshman; 46 - Mason Corbett (OF/INF) - (redshirt) Sophomore; 51 - Mason Ornelas (P/INF) - Freshman

=== Coaching staff ===
2020 Texas A&M Aggies coaching staff
Name	Position
Rob Childress	Head coach
Justin Seely	Assistant Coach
Chad Caillet	Assistant Coach
Kyle Simonds	Volunteer Assistant Coach
Cliff Pennington	Student Assistant Coach

== Schedule and results ==
2020 Texas A&M Aggies baseball game log
Regular season

February
Date	Opponent	Rank	Site/stadium	Score	Win	Loss	Save	TV	Attendance	Overall record	SEC record
February 14	Miami (OH)	No. 20	Blue Bell Park; College Station, TX	**W** 17–1	**A. Lacy (1–0)**	S. Bachman (0–1)		SECN+	5,192	1–0	
February 15	Miami (OH)	No. 20	Blue Bell Park	**W** 9–2	**C. Roa (1–0)**	T. Bosma (0–1)		SECN+	5,770	2–0	
February 16	Miami (OH)	No. 20	Blue Bell Park	**W** 6–2	**C. Jozwiak (1–0)**	K. Egbert (0–1)		SECN+	4,798	3–0	
February 18	Stephen F. Austin	No. 20	Blue Bell Park								
February 19	Prairie View A&M	No. 20	Blue Bell Park								
February 21	Army	No. 20	Blue Bell Park								
February 22	Army	No. 20	Blue Bell Park								
February 23	Army	No. 20	Blue Bell Park								
February 25	Houston Baptist	No. 18	Blue Bell Park								
February 26	Incarnate Word	No. 18	Blue Bell Park								
February 28	vs. Illinois	No. 18	Dr Pepper Ballpark; Frisco, TX								
February 29	vs. No. 10 UCLA	No. 18	Dr Pepper Ballpark								

March
Date	Opponent	Rank	Site/stadium	Score	Win	Loss	Save	TV	Attendance	Overall record	SEC record
March 1	vs. Oklahoma State	No. 18	Dr Pepper Ballpark								
March 3	Texas A&M–Corpus Christi		Blue Bell Park								
March 4	Abilene Christian		Blue Bell Park								
March 6	New Mexico State		Blue Bell Park								
March 7	New Mexico State		Blue Bell Park								
March 8	New Mexico State		Blue Bell Park								
March 10	at Rice		Reckling Park; Houston, TX								
March 13	at No. 18 Auburn		Plainsman Park; Auburn, AL								
March 14	at No. 18 Auburn		Plainsman Park								
March 15	at No. 18 Auburn		Plainsman Park								
March 17	Houston		Blue Bell Park								
March 19	Ole Miss		Blue Bell Park								
March 20	Ole Miss		Blue Bell Park								
March 21	Ole Miss		Blue Bell Park								
March 24	Lamar		Blue Bell Park								
March 27	at Florida		Alfred A. McKethan Stadium; Gainesville, FL								
March 28	at Florida		Alfred A. McKethan Stadium								
March 29	at Florida		Alfred A. McKethan Stadium								
March 31	Texas		Blue Bell Park								

April
Date	Opponent	Rank	Site/stadium	Score	Win	Loss	Save	TV	Attendance	Overall record	SEC record
April 3	Georgia		Blue Bell Park								
April 4	Georgia		Blue Bell Park								
April 5	Georgia		Blue Bell Park								
April 7	Dallas Baptist		Blue Bell Park								
April 10	at Arkansas		Baum–Walker Stadium; Fayetteville, AR								
April 11	at Arkansas		Baum–Walker Stadium								
April 12	at Arkansas		Baum–Walker Stadium								
April 14	Texas State		Blue Bell Park								
April 17	Alabama		Blue Bell Park								
April 18	Alabama		Blue Bell Park								
April 19	Alabama		Blue Bell Park								
April 21	at Sam Houston State		Don Sanders Stadium; Huntsville, TX								
April 24	at Mississippi State		Dudy Noble Field; Starkville, MS								
April 25	at Mississippi State		Dudy Noble Field								
April 26	at Mississippi State		Dudy Noble Field								
April 28	UT Arlington		Blue Bell Park								

May
Date	Opponent	Rank	Site/stadium	Score	Win	Loss	Save	TV	Attendance	Overall record	SEC record
May 1	LSU		Blue Bell Park								
May 2	LSU		Blue Bell Park								
May 3	LSU		Blue Bell Park								
May 8	Tennessee		Blue Bell Park								
May 9	Tennessee		Blue Bell Park								
May 10	Tennessee		Blue Bell Park								
May 14	at Missouri		Taylor Stadium; Columbia, MO								
May 15	at Missouri		Taylor Stadium								
May 16	at Missouri		Taylor Stadium								

Postseason

SEC Tournament
Date	Opponent	Seed	Site/stadium	Score	Win	Loss	Save	TV	Attendance	Overall record	SECT Record
May 19–24			Hoover Metropolitan Stadium; Hoover, AL								

Legend: = Win = Loss = Cancelled
Bold = Texas A&M team member

Schedule source:

*Rankings are based on the team's current ranking in the D1Baseball poll.

== 2020 MLB draft ==
Player	Position	Round	Overall	MLB team
Asa Lacy	LHP	1	4	Kansas City Royals
Zach DeLoach	OF	2	43	Seattle Mariners
Christian Roa	RHP	2	48	Cincinnati Reds
