= Taylor Stadium =

Taylor Stadium may refer to:

- Taylor Stadium (Lehigh), Lehigh University's original football stadium (1914–1987)
- Taylor Stadium (Missouri), University of Missouri's baseball stadium (2002)
