= 2020 Georgia Bulldogs baseball team =

American college baseball season

2020 Georgia Bulldogs baseball
- Conference: Southeastern Conference
- Eastern Division

Ranking
- Coaches: No. 3
- CB: No. 3
- Record: 14–4 (0–0 SEC)
- Head coach: Scott Stricklin (7th season)
- Assistant coaches: Scott Daeley (7th season); Sean Kenny (3rd season)
- Home stadium: Foley Field

2020 Southeastern Conference baseball standings
| | Conf. | | | | Overall |
| Team | W | | L | PCT | W | | L | PCT |
|---|---|---|---|---|---|---|---|---|
Eastern
| No. 1 Florida ‍‍‍ | 0 | – | 0 | – | 16 | – | 1 | .941 |
| Tennessee ‍‍‍ | 0 | – | 0 | – | 15 | – | 2 | .882 |
| No. 3 Georgia ‍‍‍ | 0 | – | 0 | – | 14 | – | 4 | .778 |
| South Carolina ‍‍‍ | 0 | – | 0 | – | 12 | – | 4 | .750 |
| No. 6 Vanderbilt ‍‍‍ | 0 | – | 0 | – | 13 | – | 5 | .722 |
| Missouri • ‍‍‍ | 0 | – | 0 | – | 11 | – | 5 | .688 |
| Kentucky ‍‍‍ | 0 | – | 0 | – | 11 | – | 6 | .647 |
Western
| No. 8 Ole Miss ‍‍‍ | 0 | – | 0 | – | 16 | – | 1 | .941 |
| Alabama ‍‍‍ | 0 | – | 0 | – | 16 | – | 1 | .941 |
| Texas A&M ‍‍‍ | 0 | – | 0 | – | 15 | – | 3 | .833 |
| No. 17 Mississippi State ‍‍‍ | 0 | – | 0 | – | 12 | – | 4 | .750 |
| No. 18 Auburn ‍‍‍ | 0 | – | 0 | – | 13 | – | 5 | .722 |
| No. 19 LSU ‍‍‍ | 0 | – | 0 | – | 12 | – | 5 | .706 |
| No. 14 Arkansas ‍‍‍ | 0 | – | 0 | – | 11 | – | 5 | .688 |
‡ – Tournament champion – ineligible for postseason due to NCAA sanctions As of March 12, 2020; Rankings from D1Baseball

The 2020 Georgia Bulldogs baseball team represented the University of Georgia during the 2020 NCAA Division I baseball season. The Bulldogs played their home games at Foley Field as a member of the Southeastern Conference They were led by head coach Scott Stricklin, in his seventh year as head coach.

== Previous season ==
The Bulldogs finished the 2019 season with a 46–17 record, compiling a 21–9 mark in the SEC. They lost in the Athens Regional during the 2019 NCAA Division I baseball tournament.

=== 2019 MLB draft ===
The Bulldogs had eight players drafted in the 2019 MLB draft.

| Player | Position | Round | Overall | MLB Team |
|---|---|---|---|---|
| Aaron Schunk | Third Base | 2 | 62 | Colorado Rockies |
| Tony Locey | Pitcher | 3 | 96 | St. Louis Cardinals |
| Tim Elliott | Pitcher | 4 | 126 | Seattle Mariners |
| LJ Talley | Second Base | 7 | 207 | Toronto Blue Jays |
| Zac Kristofak | Pitcher | 14 | 421 | Los Angeles Angels |
| Cam Shepherd | Shortstop | 20 | 608 | Tampa Bay Rays |
| Tucker Maxwell | Outfield | 22 | 660 | Philadelphia Phillies |
| Riley King | Third Base | 26 | 787 | Atlanta Braves |

== Personnel ==
=== Roster ===
2020 Georgia Bulldogs roster
| Pitchers: 3 - Brandon Smith - Freshman; 5 - C.J. Smith - Junior; 11 - Will Proctor - (redshirt) Junior; 12 - Jonathan Cannon - Freshman; 13 - Cole Wilcox - Sophomore; 16 - Will Childers - Freshman; 17 - Emerson Hancock - Junior; 18 - Bryce Melear - Freshman; 19 - Jack Gowen - Sophomore; 21 - Logan Moody - (redshirt) Senior; 22 - Ryan Suppa - Freshman; 29 - Charlie Goldstein - Freshman; 32 - Michael Polk - Freshman; 33 - Justin Glover - Senior; 34 - Garrett Brown - (redshirt) Freshman; 35 - Cain Tatum - Freshman; 39 - Darryn Pasqua - (redshirt) Sophomore; 55 - Ryan Webb - Junior | Catchers: 2 - Shane Marshall - Sophomore; 30 - Mason Meadows - (redshirt) Junior; 38 - Kale Ledford - Junior; Infielders: 1 - Buddy Floyd - Freshman; 7 - Cam Shepherd - Senior; 8 - Spencer Keefe - Freshman; 9 - Kameron Guidry - Freshman; 14 - Patrick Sullivan - (redshirt) Senior; 15 - Cole Tate - Junior; 23 - Connor Tate - (redshirt) Sophomore; 24 - Garrett Blaylock - Junior; 36 - Joshua McAllister - Junior; 50 - Ryland Goede - Freshman | Outfielders: 4 - Randon Jernigan - Sophomore; 44 - Ben Anderson - (redshirt) Sophomore; Utility: 0 - Josh Stinson (OF/INF) - Freshman; 6 - Kaden Fowler (OF/C) - (redshirt) Junior; 20 - Chaney Rogers (OF/1B) - Junior; 25 - Lane Watkins (OF/C/1B) - Freshman; 28 - Tucker Bradley (OF/P) - (redshirt) Junior; 31 - Riley King (INF/OF) - (redshirt) Junior; 41 - Ben Harris (OF/P) - Sophomore |

=== Coaching staff ===
2020 Georgia Bulldogs coaching staff
| Name | Position | Seasons at Georgia | Alma mater |
|---|---|---|---|
| Scott Stricklin | Ike Cousins Head Coach | 7 | Kent State (1995) |
| Scott Daeley | Associate head coach/recruiting coordinator | 7 | Wake Forest (2002) |
| Sean Kenny | Assistant coach/Pitching | 3 | Eastern Michigan (1997) |
| Brock Bennett | Volunteer Coach | 1 | Alabama (2011) |

== Schedule ==
Legend
| | Georgia win |
| | Georgia loss |
| | Postponement |
| **Bold** | Georgia team member |

2020 Georgia Bulldogs baseball game log
Regular season

February
| Date | Opponent | Rank | Site/stadium | Score | Win | Loss | Save | TV | Attendance | Overall record | SEC record |
|---|---|---|---|---|---|---|---|---|---|---|---|
| February 14 | Richmond | No. 5 | Foley Field; Athens, GA | **W** 7–6 | **R. Webb (1–0)** | J. DeLarso (0–1) | None | SECN+ | 2,839 | 1–0 | 0–0 |
| February 15 | Richmond | No. 5 | Foley Field | **W** 9–3 | **C. Wilcox (1–0)** | C. Lowe (0–1) | None | SECN+ | 2,959 | 2–0 | 0–0 |
| February 16 | Richmond | No. 5 | Foley Field | **W** 5–4 | **W. Childers (1–0)** | M. Olson (0–1) | **T. Bradley (1)** | SECN+ | 2,392 | 3–0 | 0–0 |
| February 19 | at Kennesaw State | No. 5 | Fred Stillwell Stadium; Kennesaw, GA | **W** 10–3 | **J. Cannon (1–0)** | L. Torbert (0–1) | None | SECN+ | 1,119 | 4–0 | 0–0 |
| February 21 | Santa Clara | No. 5 | Foley Field | **W** 9–0 | **E. Hancock (1–0)** | M. McGarry (0–1) | None | SECN+ | 2,475 | 5–0 | 0–0 |
| February 22 | Santa Clara | No. 5 | Foley Field | **W** 5–4^{12} | **J. Cannon (2–0)** | T. Howard (2–1) | None | SECN+ | 3,109 | 6–0 | 0–0 |
| February 22 | Santa Clara | No. 5 | Foley Field | **W** 6–1 | **J. Glover (1–0)** | A. Waldsmith (0–1) | None | SECN+ | 3,109 | 7–0 | 0–0 |
| February 23 | Santa Clara | No. 5 | Foley Field | **L** 4–8 | E. Heinrich (1–0) | **D. Pasqua (0–1)** | A. Tisminezky (1) | SECN+ | 2,377 | 7–1 | 0–0 |
| February 25 | Kennesaw State | No. 4 | Foley Field | **W** 15–1 | **G. Brown (1–0)** | L. Torbert (0–2) | None | SECN+ | 2,172 | 8–1 | 0–0 |
| February 28 | No. 17 Georgia Tech | No. 4 | Foley Field | **W** 6–5 | **E. Hancock (2–0)** | J. Hughes (2–1) | **R. Webb (1)** | SECN+ | 3,294 | 9–1 | 0–0 |
| February 29 | vs. No. 17 Georgia Tech | No. 4 | Truist Park; Atlanta, GA | **W** 12–0 | **C. Wilcox (2–0)** | C. Roedig (1–2) | None | SECN+ | 3,718 | 10–1 | 0–0 |

March
| Date | Opponent | Rank | Site/stadium | Score | Win | Loss | Save | TV | Attendance | Overall record | SEC record |
|---|---|---|---|---|---|---|---|---|---|---|---|
| March 1 | at No. 17 Georgia Tech | No. 4 | Russ Chandler Stadium; Atlanta, GA | **W** 9–3 | **J. Cannon (3–0)** | Z. Maxwell (1–1) | None | SECN+ | 10,299 | 11–1 | 0–0 |
| March 3 | Georgia Southern | No. 4 | Foley Field | **L** 3–6 | T. Owens (1–0) | **G. Brown (1–1)** | None | SECN+ | 2,195 | 11–2 | 0–0 |
| March 4 | vs. Georgia Southern | No. 4 | SRP Park; North Augusta, SC | Postponed | | | | | | | |
| March 6 | UMass | No. 4 | Foley Field | **W** 5–0 | **R. Webb (2–0)** | S. Harney (1–2) | None | SECN+ | 2,261 | 12–2 | 0–0 |
| March 7 | UMass | No. 4 | Foley Field | **W** 16–2 | **C. Wilcox (3–0)** | B. Shields (0–2) | None | SECN+ | 2,621 | 13–2 | 0–0 |
| March 8 | UMass | No. 4 | Foley Field | **W** 6–0 | **L. Moody (1–0)** | J. Steele (0–2) | None | SECN+ | 2,464 | 14–2 | 0–0 |
| March 10 | vs. Georgia Southern | No. 3 | SRP Park | **L** 0–1 | J. Parker (1–0) | **C. Smith (0–1)** | H. Harris (1) | SECN+ | 4,950 | 14–3 | 0–0 |
| March 11 | at Georgia Southern | No. 3 | J. I. Clements Stadium; Statesboro, GA | **L** 1–6 | T. Owens (2–0) | **G. Brown (1–2)** | None | SECN+ | 3,286 | 14–4 | 0–0 |
| March 13 | at No. 1 Florida | No. 3 | Alfred A. McKethan Stadium; Gainesville, FL | Canceled (COVID-19 pandemic) | | | | | | | |
| March 14 | at No. 1 Florida | No. 3 | Alfred A. McKethan Stadium | Canceled (COVID-19 pandemic) | | | | | | | |
| March 15 | at No. 1 Florida | No. 3 | Alfred A. McKethan Stadium | Canceled (COVID-19 pandemic) | | | | | | | |
| March 18 | USC Upstate | | Foley Field | Canceled (COVID-19 pandemic) | | | | | | | |
| March 20 | South Carolina | | Foley Field | Canceled (COVID-19 pandemic) | | | | | | | |
| March 21 | South Carolina | | Foley Field | Canceled (COVID-19 pandemic) | | | | | | | |
| March 22 | South Carolina | | Foley Field | Canceled (COVID-19 pandemic) | | | | | | | |
| March 25 | Wofford | | Foley Field | Canceled (COVID-19 pandemic) | | | | | | | |
| March 27 | at Vanderbilt | | Hawkins Field; Nashville, TN | Canceled (COVID-19 pandemic) | | | | | | | |
| March 28 | at Vanderbilt | | Hawkins Field | Canceled (COVID-19 pandemic) | | | | | | | |
| March 29 | at Vanderbilt | | Hawkins Field | Canceled (COVID-19 pandemic) | | | | | | | |
| March 31 | Georgia State | | Foley Field | Canceled (COVID-19 pandemic) | | | | | | | |

April
| Date | Opponent | Rank | Site/stadium | Score | Win | Loss | Save | TV | Attendance | Overall record | SEC record |
|---|---|---|---|---|---|---|---|---|---|---|---|
| April 3 | at Texas A&M | | Olsen Field at Blue Bell Park; College Station, TX | Canceled (COVID-19 pandemic) | | | | | | | |
| April 4 | at Texas A&M | | Olsen Field at Blue Bell Park | Canceled (COVID-19 pandemic) | | | | | | | |
| April 5 | at Texas A&M | | Olsen Field at Blue Bell Park | Canceled (COVID-19 pandemic) | | | | | | | |
| April 7 | Clemson | | Foley Field | Canceled (COVID-19 pandemic) | | | | | | | |
| April 9 | Auburn | | Foley Field | Canceled (COVID-19 pandemic) | | | | | | | |
| April 10 | Auburn | | Foley Field | Canceled (COVID-19 pandemic) | | | | | | | |
| April 11 | Auburn | | Foley Field | Canceled (COVID-19 pandemic) | | | | | | | |
| April 14 | Jacksonville State | | Foley Field | Canceled (COVID-19 pandemic) | | | | | | | |
| April 17 | at Missouri | | Taylor Stadium; Columbia, MO | Canceled (COVID-19 pandemic) | | | | | | | |
| April 18 | at Missouri | | Taylor Stadium | Canceled (COVID-19 pandemic) | | | | | | | |
| April 19 | at Missouri | | Taylor Stadium | Canceled (COVID-19 pandemic) | | | | | | | |
| April 21 | at Clemson | | Doug Kingsmore Stadium; Clemson, SC | Canceled (COVID-19 pandemic) | | | | | | | |
| April 23 | Tennessee | | Foley Field | Canceled (COVID-19 pandemic) | | | | | | | |
| April 24 | Tennessee | | Foley Field | Canceled (COVID-19 pandemic) | | | | | | | |
| April 25 | Tennessee | | Foley Field | Canceled (COVID-19 pandemic) | | | | | | | |
| April 28 | Coastal Carolina | | Foley Field | Canceled (COVID-19 pandemic) | | | | | | | |

May
| Date | Opponent | Rank | Site/stadium | Score | Win | Loss | Save | TV | Attendance | Overall record | SEC record |
|---|---|---|---|---|---|---|---|---|---|---|---|
| May 1 | Ole Miss | | Foley Field | Canceled (COVID-19 pandemic) | | | | | | | |
| May 2 | Ole Miss | | Foley Field | Canceled (COVID-19 pandemic) | | | | | | | |
| May 3 | Ole Miss | | Foley Field | Canceled (COVID-19 pandemic) | | | | | | | |
| May 8 | at Arkansas | | Baum–Walker Stadium; Fayetteville, AR | Canceled (COVID-19 pandemic) | | | | | | | |
| May 9 | at Arkansas | | Baum–Walker Stadium | Canceled (COVID-19 pandemic) | | | | | | | |
| May 10 | at Arkansas | | Baum–Walker Stadium | Canceled (COVID-19 pandemic) | | | | | | | |
| May 12 | Presbyterian | | Foley Field | Canceled (COVID-19 pandemic) | | | | | | | |
| May 14 | Kentucky | | Foley Field | Canceled (COVID-19 pandemic) | | | | | | | |
| May 15 | Kentucky | | Foley Field | Canceled (COVID-19 pandemic) | | | | | | | |
| May 16 | Kentucky | | Foley Field | Canceled (COVID-19 pandemic) | | | | | | | |

Schedule source:

*Rankings are based on the team's current ranking in the D1Baseball poll.

== 2020 MLB draft ==
| Player | Position | Round | Overall | MLB team |
|---|---|---|---|---|
| Emerson Hancock | RHP | 1 | 6 | Seattle Mariners |
| Cole Wilcox | RHP | 3 | 80 | San Diego Padres |
