= 2020 Auburn Tigers baseball team =

American college baseball season

2020 Auburn Tigers baseball
- Conference: Southeastern Conference
- Western Division

Ranking
- Coaches: No. 17
- CB: No. 17
- Record: 13–5 (0–0 SEC)
- Head coach: Butch Thompson (5th season)
- Assistant coaches: Gabe Gross; Karl Nonemaker
- Home stadium: Plainsman Park

2020 Southeastern Conference baseball standings
| | Conf. | | | | Overall |
| Team | W | | L | PCT | W | | L | PCT |
|---|---|---|---|---|---|---|---|---|
Eastern
| No. 1 Florida ‍‍‍ | 0 | – | 0 | – | 16 | – | 1 | .941 |
| Tennessee ‍‍‍ | 0 | – | 0 | – | 15 | – | 2 | .882 |
| No. 3 Georgia ‍‍‍ | 0 | – | 0 | – | 14 | – | 4 | .778 |
| South Carolina ‍‍‍ | 0 | – | 0 | – | 12 | – | 4 | .750 |
| No. 6 Vanderbilt ‍‍‍ | 0 | – | 0 | – | 13 | – | 5 | .722 |
| Missouri • ‍‍‍ | 0 | – | 0 | – | 11 | – | 5 | .688 |
| Kentucky ‍‍‍ | 0 | – | 0 | – | 11 | – | 6 | .647 |
Western
| No. 8 Ole Miss ‍‍‍ | 0 | – | 0 | – | 16 | – | 1 | .941 |
| Alabama ‍‍‍ | 0 | – | 0 | – | 16 | – | 1 | .941 |
| Texas A&M ‍‍‍ | 0 | – | 0 | – | 15 | – | 3 | .833 |
| No. 17 Mississippi State ‍‍‍ | 0 | – | 0 | – | 12 | – | 4 | .750 |
| No. 18 Auburn ‍‍‍ | 0 | – | 0 | – | 13 | – | 5 | .722 |
| No. 19 LSU ‍‍‍ | 0 | – | 0 | – | 12 | – | 5 | .706 |
| No. 14 Arkansas ‍‍‍ | 0 | – | 0 | – | 11 | – | 5 | .688 |
‡ – Tournament champion – ineligible for postseason due to NCAA sanctions As of March 12, 2020; Rankings from D1Baseball

The 2020 Auburn Tigers baseball team represented Auburn University in the 2020 NCAA Division I baseball season. The Tigers played their home games at Plainsman Park.

== Previous season ==
The Tigers finished 38–28 overall, and 14–16 in the conference. The Tigers won the Atlanta Regional and the Chapel Hill Super Regional in the 2019 NCAA Division I baseball tournament to advance to the College World Series for the first time since 1997.

== Schedule and results ==
2020 Auburn Tigers baseball game log
Regular season

February
| Date | Opponent | Rank | Site/stadium | Score | Win | Loss | Save | TV | Attendance | Overall record | SEC record |
|---|---|---|---|---|---|---|---|---|---|---|---|
| February 14 | UIC | No. 8 | Plainsman Park; Auburn, AL | **W** 5–3 | **T. Burns (1–0)** | J. Key (0–1) | **C. Greenhill (1)** | SECN+ | 3,753 | 1–0 | – |
| February 15 | UIC | No. 8 | Plainsman Park | **W** 18–1 | **J. Owen (1–0)** | N. Oliff (0–1) | None | SECN+ | 3,850 | 2–0 | – |
| February 15 | UIC | No. 8 | Plainsman Park | **W** 7–3 | **R. Fitts (1–0)** | M. McCabe (0–1) | None | SECN+ | 4,061 | 3–0 | – |
| February 16 | UIC | No. 8 | Plainsman Park | **W** 14–0^{(7)} | **B. Horn (1–0)** | B. Nicholson (0–1) | None | SECN+ | 2,083 | 4–0 | – |
| February 18 | Oakland | No. 8 | Plainsman Park | **W** 17–1 | **T. Bright (1–0)** | D. Rutan (0–1) | None | | 2,595 | 5–0 | – |
| February 21 | UCF | No. 8 | Plainsman Park | **L** 1–3 | C. Gordon (2–0) | **T. Burns (1–1)** | J. Hakanson (2) | | 3,056 | 5–1 | – |
| February 22 | UCF | No. 8 | Plainsman Park | **L** 3–7 | T. Holloway (2–2) | **J. Owen (1–1)** | J. Hakanson (3) | | 3,732 | 5–2 | – |
| February 23 | UCF | No. 8 | Plainsman Park | **L** 2–12 | J. Sheridan (1–0) | **B. Horn (1–1)** | None | | 2,976 | 5–3 | – |
| February 25 | Alabama A&M | No. 20 | Plainsman Park | **W** 10–0 | **B. Fuller (1–0)** | O. Smith (0–2) | None | | 2,583 | 6–3 | – |
| February 26 | Alabama A&M | No. 20 | Plainsman Park | **W** 12–6 | **H. Mullins (1–0)** | B. Gomez (0–2) | None | | 2,575 | 7–3 | – |
| February 28 | Wright State | No. 20 | Plainsman Park | **W** 7–2 | **T. Burns (2–1)** | D. Kreuzer (0–3) | **C. Greenhill (2)** | SECN+ | 2,956 | 8–3 | – |
| February 29 | Wright State | No. 20 | Plainsman Park | **W** 20–6 | **J. Owen (2–1)** | B. Brehmer (0–3) | None | SECN+ | 3,607 | 9–3 | – |

March
| Date | Opponent | Rank | Site/stadium | Score | Win | Loss | Save | TV | Attendance | Overall record | SEC record |
|---|---|---|---|---|---|---|---|---|---|---|---|
| March 1 | Wright State | No. 20 | Plainsman Park | **W** 6–0 | **B. Horn (2–1)** | A. Cline (1–2) | None | | 2,995 | 10–3 | – |
| March 3 | Samford | No. 19 | Plainsman Park | Rescheduled for May 12 | | | | | | | |
| March 6 | Chicago State | No. 19 | Plainsman Park | **W** 6–0 | **T. Burns (3–1)** | D. Cumming (0–4) | None | SECN+ | 2,783 | 11–3 | – |
| March 7 | Chicago State | No. 19 | Plainsman Park | **W** 16–2 | **J. Owen (3–1)** | R. Valdes (1–3) | None | SECN+ | 3,213 | 12–3 | – |
| March 8 | Chicago State | No. 19 | Plainsman Park | **W** 9–0 | **B. Horn (3–1)** | V. Venturi (1–3) | None | SECN+ | 2,950 | 13–3 | – |
| March 10 | Georgia Tech | No. 18 | Plainsman Park | **L** 2–6 | D. Smith (3–0) | **B. Fuller (1–1)** | None | SECN | 2,814 | 13–4 | – |
| March 11 | Wofford | No. 18 | Plainsman Park | **L** 3–4 | D. Rhadans (4–0) | **T. Bright (1–1)** | R. Pandya (3) | SECN | 2,591 | 13–5 | – |
| March 13 | Texas A&M | No. 18 | Plainsman Park | Canceled due to the COVID-19 pandemic | | | | | | | |
| March 14 | Texas A&M | No. 18 | Plainsman Park | Canceled due to the COVID-19 pandemic | | | | | | | |
| March 15 | Texas A&M | No. 18 | Plainsman Park | Canceled due to the COVID-19 pandemic | | | | | | | |
| March 17 | Alabama State | | Plainsman Park | Canceled due to the COVID-19 pandemic | | | | | | | |
| March 20 | at Missouri | | Taylor Stadium; Columbia, MO | Canceled due to the COVID-19 pandemic | | | | | | | |
| March 21 | at Missouri | | Taylor Stadium | Canceled due to the COVID-19 pandemic | | | | | | | |
| March 22 | at Missouri | | Taylor Stadium | Canceled due to the COVID-19 pandemic | | | | | | | |
| March 27 | at Alabama | | Sewell–Thomas Stadium; Tuscaloosa, AL | Canceled due to the COVID-19 pandemic | | | | | | | |
| March 28 | at Alabama | | Sewell–Thomas Stadium | Canceled due to the COVID-19 pandemic | | | | | | | |
| March 29 | at Alabama | | Sewell–Thomas Stadium | Canceled due to the COVID-19 pandemic | | | | | | | |
| March 31 | UAB | | Plainsman Park | Canceled due to the COVID-19 pandemic | | | | | | | |

April
| Date | Opponent | Rank | Site/stadium | Score | Win | Loss | Save | TV | Attendance | Overall record | SEC record |
|---|---|---|---|---|---|---|---|---|---|---|---|
| April 3 | Mississippi State | | Plainsman Park | Canceled due to the COVID-19 pandemic | | | | | | | |
| April 4 | Mississippi State | | Plainsman Park | Canceled due to the COVID-19 pandemic | | | | | | | |
| April 5 | Mississippi State | | Plainsman Park | Canceled due to the COVID-19 pandemic | | | | | | | |
| April 7 | at Georgia Tech | | Russ Chandler Stadium; Atlanta, GA | Canceled due to the COVID-19 pandemic | | | | | | | |
| April 9 | at Georgia | | Foley Field; Athens, GA | Canceled due to the COVID-19 pandemic | | | | | | | |
| April 10 | at Georgia | | Foley Field | Canceled due to the COVID-19 pandemic | | | | | | | |
| April 11 | at Georgia | | Foley Field | Canceled due to the COVID-19 pandemic | | | | | | | |
| April 14 | at Samford | | Joe Lee Griffin Stadium; Birmingham, AL | Canceled due to the COVID-19 pandemic | | | | | | | |
| April 17 | Kentucky | | Plainsman Park | Canceled due to the COVID-19 pandemic | | | | | | | |
| April 18 | Kentucky | | Plainsman Park | Canceled due to the COVID-19 pandemic | | | | | | | |
| April 19 | Kentucky | | Plainsman Park | Canceled due to the COVID-19 pandemic | | | | | | | |
| April 21 | Florida A&M | | Plainsman Park | Canceled due to the COVID-19 pandemic | | | | | | | |
| April 24 | at Arkansas | | Baum–Walker Stadium; Fayetteville, AR | Canceled due to the COVID-19 pandemic | | | | | | | |
| April 25 | at Arkansas | | Baum–Walker Stadium | Canceled due to the COVID-19 pandemic | | | | | | | |
| April 26 | at Arkansas | | Baum–Walker Stadium | Canceled due to the COVID-19 pandemic | | | | | | | |

May
| Date | Opponent | Rank | Site/stadium | Score | Win | Loss | Save | TV | Attendance | Overall record | SEC record |
|---|---|---|---|---|---|---|---|---|---|---|---|
| May 1 | Florida | | Plainsman Park | Canceled due to the COVID-19 pandemic | | | | | | | |
| May 2 | Florida | | Plainsman Park | Canceled due to the COVID-19 pandemic | | | | | | | |
| May 3 | Florida | | Plainsman Park | Canceled due to the COVID-19 pandemic | | | | | | | |
| May 5 | at UAB | | Regions Field; Birmingham, AL | Canceled due to the COVID-19 pandemic | | | | | | | |
| May 8 | at Ole Miss | | Swayze Field; Oxford, MS | Canceled due to the COVID-19 pandemic | | | | | | | |
| May 9 | at Ole Miss | | Swayze Field | Canceled due to the COVID-19 pandemic | | | | | | | |
| May 10 | at Ole Miss | | Swayze Field | Canceled due to the COVID-19 pandemic | | | | | | | |
| May 14 | LSU | | Plainsman Park | Canceled due to the COVID-19 pandemic | | | | | | | |
| May 15 | LSU | | Plainsman Park | Canceled due to the COVID-19 pandemic | | | | | | | |
| May 16 | LSU | | Plainsman Park | Canceled due to the COVID-19 pandemic | | | | | | | |

Post-Season

SEC Tournament
| Date | Opponent | Seed | Site/stadium | Score | Win | Loss | Save | TV | Attendance | Overall record | SECT record |
|---|---|---|---|---|---|---|---|---|---|---|---|
| May 19–24 | | | Hoover Metropolitan Stadium; Hoover, AL | Canceled due to the COVID-19 pandemic | | | | | | | |

Legend: = Win = Loss = Cancelled
Bold = Auburn team member

Schedule source:

*Rankings are based on the team's current ranking in the D1Baseball poll.

== 2020 MLB draft ==
| Player | Position | Round | Overall | MLB team |
|---|---|---|---|---|
| Tanner Burns | RHP | A | 36 | Cleveland Indians |
| Bailey Horn | LHP | 5 | 142 | Chicago White Sox |
