= 2020 Tennessee Volunteers baseball team =

American college baseball season

2020 Tennessee Volunteers baseball
- Conference: Southeastern Conference
- Eastern Division

Ranking
- Coaches: No. 11
- CB: No. 16
- Record: 15–2 (0–0 SEC)
- Head coach: Tony Vitello (3rd season)
- Assistant coaches: Frank Anderson; Josh Elander
- Home stadium: Lindsey Nelson Stadium

2020 Southeastern Conference baseball standings
	Conf.				Overall
Team	W		L	PCT	W		L	PCT
Eastern
No. 1 Florida ‍‍‍	0	–	0	–	16	–	1	.941
Tennessee ‍‍‍	0	–	0	–	15	–	2	.882
No. 3 Georgia ‍‍‍	0	–	0	–	14	–	4	.778
South Carolina ‍‍‍	0	–	0	–	12	–	4	.750
No. 6 Vanderbilt ‍‍‍	0	–	0	–	13	–	5	.722
Missouri • ‍‍‍	0	–	0	–	11	–	5	.688
Kentucky ‍‍‍	0	–	0	–	11	–	6	.647
Western
No. 8 Ole Miss ‍‍‍	0	–	0	–	16	–	1	.941
Alabama ‍‍‍	0	–	0	–	16	–	1	.941
Texas A&M ‍‍‍	0	–	0	–	15	–	3	.833
No. 17 Mississippi State ‍‍‍	0	–	0	–	12	–	4	.750
No. 18 Auburn ‍‍‍	0	–	0	–	13	–	5	.722
No. 19 LSU ‍‍‍	0	–	0	–	12	–	5	.706
No. 14 Arkansas ‍‍‍	0	–	0	–	11	–	5	.688
‡ – Tournament champion – ineligible for postseason due to NCAA sanctions As of March 12, 2020; Rankings from D1Baseball

The 2020 Tennessee Volunteers baseball team represented the University of Tennessee in the 2020 NCAA Division I baseball season. The Volunteers played their home games at Lindsey Nelson Stadium.

== Previous season ==
The Volunteers finished 40–21 overall, and 14–16 in the conference.

== Preseason ==
=== SEC media poll ===
The SEC media poll was released on February 6, 2020 with the Volunteers predicted to finish in fourth place in the Eastern Division.

Media poll (East)
Predicted finish	Team	Votes (1st place)
1	Vanderbilt	87 (9)
2	Florida	77 (3)
3	Georgia	76 (2)
4	Tennessee	50
5	South Carolina	48
6	Missouri	32
7	Kentucky	22

== Personnel ==
=== Roster ===
2020 Tennessee Volunteers roster
Pitchers: 11 - Will Heflin - Senior; 15 - Kody Davidson - Junior; 16 - Camden Sewell - Sophomore; 18 - Chase Wallace - Junior; 25 - Christian Delashmit - Freshman; 26 - Jason Rackers - Junior; 28 - Elijah Pleasants - Sophomore; 31 - Jackson Leath - Junior; 32 - Sean Hunley - Junior; 33 - Mark McLaughlin - Freshman; 34 - Garrett Crochet - Junior; 35 - Kirby Connell - Freshman; 36 - Chad Dallas - Sophomore; 41 - Will Mabrey - Freshman; 43 - Sam Fulton - Freshman; 46 - Redmond Walsh - (redshirt) Junior	Catchers: 17 - Connor Pavolony - Sophomore; 19 - Landon Gray - Senior; Infielders: 2 - Max Ferguson - Sophomore; 4 - Liam Spence - Junior; 7 - Jake Rucker - Sophomore; 14 - Austin Knight - Sophomore; 20 - Jorel Ortega - Freshman; 40 - Luc Lipcius - (redshirt) Junior	Outfielders: 5 - Zach Daniels - Junior; 6 - Evan Russell - Junior; 8 - Christian Scott - Sophomore; 9 - Matt Turino - Junior; 27 - Jordan Beck - Freshman; Utility: 1 - Alerick Soularie (OF/INF) - Junior; 10 - Pete Derkay (UTL) - Senior; 12 - Drew Gilbert (OF/P) - Freshman; 13 - Cortland Lawson (INF/P) - Freshman; 21 - Trey Lipscomb (INF/P) - Sophomore; 30 - Ethan Payne (INF/P) - Freshman; 38 - Ethan Anderson (P/OF) - Freshman; 42 - Zane Keener (OF/P) - Freshman

=== Coaching staff ===
2020 Tennessee Volunteers coaching staff
Name	Position	Seasons at Tennessee
Tony Vitello	Head coach	3
Frank Anderson	Assistant Coach/Pitching	3
Josh Elander	Assistant Coach/Recruiting Coordinator	3
Ross Kivett	Volunteer Assistant Coach/Camp Coordinator	3
Richard Jackson	Student Assistant Pitching Coach	1
Quentin Eberhardt	Director of Baseball Sports Performance	3

== Schedule and results ==
2020 Tennessee Volunteers baseball game log
Regular season

February (11–0)
Date	Opponent	Rank	Site/stadium	Score	Win	Loss	Save	TV	Attendance	Overall record	SEC record
February 14	Western Illinois		Lindsey Nelson Stadium; Knoxville, TN	**W** 3–0	C. Dallas (1–0)	J. Drake (0–1)	**S. Hunley (1)**	SECN+	1,227	1–0	
February 15	Western Illinois		Lindsey Nelson Stadium	**W** 19–0	C. Wallace (1–0)	J. Warkentien (0–1)		SECN+	1,744	2–0	
February 16	Western Illinois		Lindsey Nelson Stadium	**W** 23–4	J. Leath (1–0)	J. Carberry (0–1)		SECN+	1,470	3–0	
February 18	Charlotte		Lindsey Nelson Stadium	**W** 8–2	E. Pleasants (1–0)	T. Starnes (0–1)		SECN+	983	4–0	
February 21	vs. No. 6 Texas Tech		Dell Diamond; Round Rock, TX	**W** 6–2	C. Dallas (2–0)	C. Beeter (1–1)	**S. Hunley (2)**		4,552	5–0	
February 22	vs. Houston		Dell Diamond	**W** 8–4	J. Leath (2–0)	T. Bayless (0–1)				6–0	
February 23	vs. No. 25 Stanford		Dell Diamond	**W** 7–2	D. Gilbert (1–0)	A. Williams (1–1)	**R. Walsh (1)**			7–0	
February 25	Northern Kentucky	No. 24	Lindsey Nelson Stadium	**W** 15–1	C. Delashmit (1–0)	N. Richardson (0–1)			1,454	8–0	
February 26	UNC Asheville	No. 24	Lindsey Nelson Stadium	**W** 12–1	M. McLaughlin (1–0)	B. Little (0–1)			1,016	9–0	
February 28	George Washington	No. 24	Lindsey Nelson Stadium	**W** 7–1	C. Dallas (3–0)	H. Cohen (1–1)	**S. Hunley (2)**		1,034	10–0	
February 29	George Washington	No. 24	Lindsey Nelson Stadium	**W** 7–3	R. Walsh (1–0)	C. Harris (0–1)			1,598	11–0	

March (2–0)
Date	Opponent	Rank	Site/stadium	Score	Win	Loss	Save	TV	Attendance	Overall record	SEC record
March 1	George Washington	No. 24	Lindsey Nelson Stadium	**W** 10–0	**J. Leath (2–0)**	E. Raimo (2–1)			2,157	12–0	
March 3	Longwood	No. 20	Lindsey Nelson Stadium	**W** 28–2	**C. Delashmit (2–0)**	D. Champagne (1–1)			1,413	13–0	
March 6	Wright State	No. 20	Lindsey Nelson Stadium								
March 7	Wright State	No. 20	Lindsey Nelson Stadium								
March 8	Wright State	No. 20	Lindsey Nelson Stadium								
March 10	East Tennessee State		Lindsey Nelson Stadium								
March 13	at South Carolina		Founders Park; Columbia, SC								
March 14	at South Carolina		Founders Park								
March 15	at South Carolina		Founders Park								
March 17	Georgia State		Lindsey Nelson Stadium								
March 20	Vanderbilt		Lindsey Nelson Stadium								
March 21	Vanderbilt		Lindsey Nelson Stadium								
March 22	Vanderbilt		Lindsey Nelson Stadium								
March 24	vs. UT Martin		Smokies Stadium; Kodak, TN								
March 26	LSU		Lindsey Nelson Stadium								
March 27	LSU		Lindsey Nelson Stadium								
March 28	LSU		Lindsey Nelson Stadium								

April
Date	Opponent	Rank	Site/stadium	Score	Win	Loss	Save	TV	Attendance	Overall record	SEC record
April 1	Georgia Southern		Lindsey Nelson Stadium								
April 3	at Missouri		Taylor Stadium; Columbia, MO								
April 4	at Missouri		Taylor Stadium								
April 5	at Missouri		Taylor Stadium								
April 7	Alabama State		Lindsey Nelson Stadium								
April 8	Alabama State		Lindsey Nelson Stadium								
April 10	at Alabama		Sewell–Thomas Stadium; Tuscaloosa, AL								
April 11	at Alabama		Sewell–Thomas Stadium								
April 12	at Alabama		Sewell–Thomas Stadium								
April 14	Alabama A&M		Lindsey Nelson Stadium								
April 17	Florida		Lindsey Nelson Stadium								
April 18	Florida		Lindsey Nelson Stadium								
April 19	Florida		Lindsey Nelson Stadium								
April 21	Morehead State		Lindsey Nelson Stadium								
April 23	at Georgia		Foley Field; Athens, GA								
April 24	at Georgia		Foley Field								
April 25	at Georgia		Foley Field								
April 28	Lipscomb		Lindsey Nelson Stadium								

May
Date	Opponent	Rank	Site/stadium	Score	Win	Loss	Save	TV	Attendance	Overall record	SEC record
May 1	Kentucky		Lindsey Nelson Stadium								
May 2	Kentucky		Lindsey Nelson Stadium								
May 3	Kentucky		Lindsey Nelson Stadium								
May 8	at Texas A&M		Olsen Field at Blue Bell Park; College Station, TX								
May 9	at Texas A&M		Olsen Field at Blue Bell Park								
May 10	at Texas A&M		Olsen Field at Blue Bell Park								
May 12	Belmont		Lindsey Nelson Stadium								
May 14	Arkansas		Lindsey Nelson Stadium								
May 15	Arkansas		Lindsey Nelson Stadium								
May 16	Arkansas		Lindsey Nelson Stadium								

Postseason

SEC Tournament
Date	Opponent	Seed	Site/stadium	Score	Win	Loss	Save	TV	Attendance	Overall record	SECT Record
May 19–24			Hoover Metropolitan Stadium; Hoover, AL								

Legend: = Win = Loss = Cancelled
Bold = Tennessee team member

Schedule source:

*Rankings are based on the team's current ranking in the D1Baseball poll.

== Rankings ==
Ranking movements Legend: ██ Increase in ranking ██ Decrease in ranking — = Not ranked RV = Received votes
	Week																		
Poll	Pre	1	2	3	4	5	6	7	8	9	10	11	12	13	14	15	16	17	Final
Coaches'	RV	RV*		11															
Baseball America	—	—	—	18															
Collegiate Baseball^	RV	—	23	16															
NCBWA†	RV	RV	24	16															
D1Baseball	—	—	24	20															

^ Collegiate Baseball ranked 40 teams in their preseason poll, but only ranked 30 teams weekly during the season.
† NCBWA ranks 30 teams in their preseason poll, but only ranks 25 teams weekly during the season.
* A new poll was not released for this week, so for comparison purposes, the previous week's ranking is inserted in this week's slot.

== 2020 MLB draft ==
Player	Position	Round	Overall	MLB team
Garrett Crochet	LHP	1	11	Chicago White Sox
Alerick Soularie	OF	2	59	Minnesota Twins
Zach Daniels	OF	4	131	Houston Astros
