= 2020 Missouri Tigers baseball team =

University of Missouri baseball team

2020 Missouri Tigers baseball
- Conference: Southeastern Conference
- Eastern Division
- Record: 11-5 (0–0 SEC)
- Head coach: Steve Bieser (4th season)
- Assistant coaches: Todd Butler; Fred Corral
- Home stadium: Taylor Stadium

2020 Southeastern Conference baseball standings
	Conf.				Overall
Team	W		L	PCT	W		L	PCT
Eastern
No. 1 Florida ‍‍‍	0	–	0	–	16	–	1	.941
Tennessee ‍‍‍	0	–	0	–	15	–	2	.882
No. 3 Georgia ‍‍‍	0	–	0	–	14	–	4	.778
South Carolina ‍‍‍	0	–	0	–	12	–	4	.750
No. 6 Vanderbilt ‍‍‍	0	–	0	–	13	–	5	.722
Missouri • ‍‍‍	0	–	0	–	11	–	5	.688
Kentucky ‍‍‍	0	–	0	–	11	–	6	.647
Western
No. 8 Ole Miss ‍‍‍	0	–	0	–	16	–	1	.941
Alabama ‍‍‍	0	–	0	–	16	–	1	.941
Texas A&M ‍‍‍	0	–	0	–	15	–	3	.833
No. 17 Mississippi State ‍‍‍	0	–	0	–	12	–	4	.750
No. 18 Auburn ‍‍‍	0	–	0	–	13	–	5	.722
No. 19 LSU ‍‍‍	0	–	0	–	12	–	5	.706
No. 14 Arkansas ‍‍‍	0	–	0	–	11	–	5	.688
‡ – Tournament champion – ineligible for postseason due to NCAA sanctions As of March 12, 2020; Rankings from D1Baseball

The 2020 Missouri Tigers baseball team represented the University of Missouri in the 2020 NCAA Division I baseball season. The Tigers played their home games at Taylor Stadium under fourth year coach Steve Bieser.

== Previous season ==
The Tigers finished 34–22–1 overall, and 13–16–1 in the conference.

=== 2019 MLB draft ===
The Tigers had five players drafted in the 2019 MLB draft.

Player	Position	Round	Overall	MLB Team
Kameron Misner	Center Field	1	35	Miami Marlins
T. J. Sikkema	Pitcher	1	38	New York Yankees
Jacob Cantleberry	Pitcher	13	401	Los Angeles Dodgers
Chris Cornelius	Shortstop	16	480	Philadelphia Phillies
Cameron Dulle	Pitcher	30	905	St. Louis Cardinals
**Ben Pederson**	Pitcher	38	1128	Baltimore Orioles

Players in bold are signees drafted from high school that will attend Missouri.

== Personnel ==
=== Roster ===
2020 Missouri Tigers roster
**Pitchers**: 4 - Tommy Springer - Sophomore; 11 - Konnor Ash - Junior; 17 - Ben Pedersen - Freshman; 18 - Art Joven - Senior; 27 - Andrew Vail - Sophomore; 29 - Shane Wilhelm - Freshman; 32 - Ian Bedell - Junior; 35 - Spencer Miles - Freshman; 39 - Lukas Veinbergs - Senior; 42 - Cameron Pferrer - Junior; 43 - Spencer Juergens - Senior; 44 - Kyle Potthoff - Freshman; 45 - Tom Skoro - (redshirt) Junior; 46 - Zach McManus - Freshman; 47 - Trey Dillard - Junior; 48 - Trae Robertson - Sophomore; 49 - Steven Sanchez - (redshirt) Freshman; 51 - Brenner Maloney - Freshman	**Catchers**: 3 - Tre Morris - Sophomore; 20 - Chad McDaniel - Junior; 25 - Eric Rinzel - Freshman; 26 - Bret Madren - Freshman; 28 - Garrison Bennett - Freshman; **Infielders**: 6 - Art Schoenstadt - Freshman; 9 - Mark Vierling - Junior; 13 - Cameron Swanger - Sophomore; 21 - Brandt Belk - (redshirt) Junior; 23 - Austin James - Senior; 24 - Dalton McNamara - Freshman; 40 - Peter Zimmermann - Senior	**Outfielders**: 1 - Josh Holt Jr. - Sophomore; 2 - Thomas Broyles - Junior; 10 - Clayton Peterson - Junior; 12 - Blake Jackson - Freshman; 14 - Alex Peterson - Junior; **Utility**: 7 - Jackson Lancaster (OF/P) - Junior; 8 - Seth Halvorsen (INF/P) - (redshirt) Freshman; 16 - Luke Mann (INF/P) - (redshirt) Freshman; 30 - Ty Wilmsmeyer (P/INF) - Freshman

=== Coaching staff ===
2020 Missouri Tigers coaching staff
Name	Position
Steve Bieser	Head coach
Fred Corral	Pitching Coach/Recruiting Coordinator
Brett Peel	Volunteer Assistant Coach
Jae Fadde	Director of Baseball Operations
Matt Ridgway	Athletic Trainer
Ryan Johnson	Strength & conditioning
Andy Oldenburg	Sports Information Director
Jason Hagerty	Student Manager
Alex Barton	Student Manager
Chase Harmon	Student Manager

== Schedule and results ==
2020 Missouri Tigers baseball game log
Regular season

February
Date	Opponent	Rank	Site/stadium	Score	Win	Loss	Save	TV	Attendance	Overall record	SEC record
February 14	at Jacksonville State		Rudy Abbott Field; Jacksonville, AL	**W** 10–4	**I. Bedell (1–0)**	D. Hathcock (0–1)		ESPN+	1,039	1–0	
February 15	at Jacksonville State		Rudy Abbott Field	**W** 6–4^{(12)}	**T. Dillard (1–0)**	C. Lovrich (0–1)		ESPN+	1,125	2–0	
February 16	at Jacksonville State		Rudy Abbott Field	**L** 8–9	A. Downey (1–0)	**B. Pedersen (0–1)**	T. Fortner (1)	ESPN+	1.051	2–1	
February 21	vs. Kansas State; Kleberg Bank College Classic		Whataburger Field; Corpus Christi, TX	**L** 1–5	C. McCullough (1–0)	**I. Bedell (1–1)**		FloLive	235	2–2	
February 22	vs. Utah; Kleberg Bank College Classic		Whataburger Field	**W** 3-2	**K. Ash (1-0)**	D. Watson (0-1)	**T. Dillard (1)**	FloLive	200	3-2	
February 23	at Texas A&M–Corpus Christi; Kleberg Bank College Classic		Whataburger Field	**W** 8-4	**A. Vail (1-0)**	L. Perez (0-1)	**S. Miles (1)**	FloLive	897	4-2	
February 24	at Texas A&M–Corpus Christi		Whataburger Field	**L** 2-5	D. Worrell (1-0)	**L. Veinbergs (0-1)**			407	4-3	
February 26	at McNeese State		Joe Miller Ballpark; Lake Charles, LA	**L** 4-12	I. Duplechain (2-0)	**A. Joven (0-1)**			697	4-4	
February 28	vs. Baylor; Shriners College Classic		Minute Maid Park; Houston, TX	**L** 2-4	L. Freeman (1-0)	**I. Bedell (1-2)**	L. Boyd (3)			4-5	
February 29	vs. No. 22 Oklahoma; Shriners College Classic		Minute Maid Park	**W** 8-7 (10)	**T. Dillard (2-0)**	A. Brooks (1-1)			521	5-5	

March
Date	Opponent	Rank	Site/stadium	Score	Win	Loss	Save	TV	Attendance	Overall record	SEC record
March 1	vs. Texas; Shriners College Classic		Minute Maid Park	**W** 9-8	**S. Wilhelm (1-0)**	K. Kubichek (1-1)	**T. Dillard (2)**			6-5	
March 6	Western Illinois		Taylor Stadium; Columbia, MO	**W** 7-3	**I. Bedell (2-2)**	J. Beck (0-2)	**S. Juergens (1)**		844	7-5	
March 7	Western Illinois		Taylor Stadium	**W** 6-5	**K. Ash (2-0)**	B. Sears (0-1)	**T. Dillard (3)**		927	8-5	
March 8	Western Illinois		Taylor Stadium	**W** 7-4	**S. Miles (1-0)**	J. Warkentien (0-4)	**T. Dillard (4)**		948	9-5	
March 10	Northern Illinois		Taylor Stadium	**W** 6–3	**Joven** (1–1)	Walker (0–2)	**Dillard** (5)	SECN+	624	10–5	
March 11	Northern Illinois		Taylor Stadium	**W** 3–2^{12}	**Robertson** (1–0)	Thomas (2–2)		SECN+	662	11–5	
March 13	at Alabama		Sewell–Thomas Stadium; Tuscaloosa, AL								
March 14	at Alabama		Sewell–Thomas Stadium								
March 15	at Alabama		Sewell–Thomas Stadium								
March 18	Iowa		Taylor Stadium					SECN+			
March 20	Auburn		Taylor Stadium					SECN+			
March 21	Auburn		Taylor Stadium					SECN+			
March 22	Auburn		Taylor Stadium					SECN+			
March 24	at Southeast Missouri State		Capaha Field; Cape Girardeau, MO								
March 25	at Southeast Missouri State		Capaha Field								
March 27	at South Carolina		Founders Park; Columbia, SC								
March 28	at South Carolina		Founders Park								
March 29	at South Carolina		Founders Park								
March 31	SIU Edwardsville		Taylor Stadium								

April
Date	Opponent	Rank	Site/stadium	Score	Win	Loss	Save	TV	Attendance	Overall record	SEC record
April 3	Tennessee		Taylor Stadium								
April 4	Tennessee		Taylor Stadium								
April 5	Tennessee		Taylor Stadium								
April 7	Saint Louis		Taylor Stadium								
April 9	at Florida		Alfred A. McKethan Stadium; Gainesville, FL								
April 10	at Florida		Alfred A. McKethan Stadium								
April 11	at Florida		Alfred A. McKethan Stadium								
April 14	Arkansas–Pine Bluff		Taylor Stadium								
April 15	Arkansas–Pine Bluff		Taylor Stadium								
April 17	Georgia		Taylor Stadium								
April 18	Georgia		Taylor Stadium								
April 19	Georgia		Taylor Stadium								
April 21	Missouri State		Taylor Stadium								
April 23	at Kentucky		Kentucky Proud Park; Lexington, KY								
April 24	at Kentucky		Kentucky Proud Park								
April 25	at Kentucky		Kentucky Proud Park								
April 28	at Missouri State		Hammons Field; Springfield, MO								

May
Date	Opponent	Rank	Site/stadium	Score	Win	Loss	Save	TV	Attendance	Overall record	SEC record
May 1	Vanderbilt		Taylor Stadium								
May 2	Vanderbilt		Taylor Stadium								
May 3	Vanderbilt		Taylor Stadium								
May 8	at Mississippi State		Dudy Noble Field; Starkville, MS								
May 9	at Mississippi State		Dudy Noble Field								
May 10	at Mississippi State		Dudy Noble Field								
May 14	Texas A&M		Taylor Stadium								
May 15	Texas A&M		Taylor Stadium								
May 16	Texas A&M		Taylor Stadium								

Postseason

SEC Tournament
Date	Opponent	Seed	Site/stadium	Score	Win	Loss	Save	TV	Attendance	Overall record	SECT Record
May 19–24			Hoover Metropolitan Stadium; Hoover, AL								

Legend: = Win = Loss = Cancelled
Bold = Missouri team member

Schedule source:

*Rankings are based on the team's current ranking in the D1Baseball poll.

=== Sanctions ===
The Tigers received NCAA sanctions in the off-season. This included a one-year postseason ban, scholarship and recruiting limitations, and a monetary fine.
