= 2020 Mississippi State Bulldogs baseball team =

American college baseball season

2020 Mississippi State Bulldogs baseball
- Conference: Southeastern Conference
- Western Division

Ranking
- Coaches: No. 19
- CB: No. 12
- Record: 12–4 (0–0 SEC)
- Head coach: Chris Lemonis (2nd season)
- Assistant coaches: Scott Foxhall; Jake Gautreau
- Home stadium: Dudy Noble Field, Polk–DeMent Stadium

2020 Southeastern Conference baseball standings
	Conf.				Overall
Team	W		L	PCT	W		L	PCT
Eastern
No. 1 Florida ‍‍‍	0	–	0	–	16	–	1	.941
Tennessee ‍‍‍	0	–	0	–	15	–	2	.882
No. 3 Georgia ‍‍‍	0	–	0	–	14	–	4	.778
South Carolina ‍‍‍	0	–	0	–	12	–	4	.750
No. 6 Vanderbilt ‍‍‍	0	–	0	–	13	–	5	.722
Missouri • ‍‍‍	0	–	0	–	11	–	5	.688
Kentucky ‍‍‍	0	–	0	–	11	–	6	.647
Western
No. 8 Ole Miss ‍‍‍	0	–	0	–	16	–	1	.941
Alabama ‍‍‍	0	–	0	–	16	–	1	.941
Texas A&M ‍‍‍	0	–	0	–	15	–	3	.833
No. 17 Mississippi State ‍‍‍	0	–	0	–	12	–	4	.750
No. 18 Auburn ‍‍‍	0	–	0	–	13	–	5	.722
No. 19 LSU ‍‍‍	0	–	0	–	12	–	5	.706
No. 14 Arkansas ‍‍‍	0	–	0	–	11	–	5	.688
‡ – Tournament champion – ineligible for postseason due to NCAA sanctions As of March 12, 2020; Rankings from D1Baseball

The 2020 Mississippi State Bulldogs baseball team represented Mississippi State University in the 2020 NCAA Division I baseball season. The Bulldogs played their home games at Dudy Noble Field, Polk–DeMent Stadium.

== Previous season ==
The Bulldogs finished 52–15 overall, and 20–10 in the conference. They participated in the 2019 College World Series

== Preseason ==
=== SEC Coaches poll ===
The SEC coaches poll was released on February 6, 2020 with the Tigers predicted to finish tied for third in the Western Division.

Media poll (West)
Predicted finish	Team	Votes (1st place)
1	Arkansas	82 (5)
2	Mississippi State	73 (4)
T–3	Auburn	67 (2)
T–3	LSU	67 (3)
5	Texas A&M	44
6	Ole Miss	38
7	Alabama	21

== Schedule and results ==
2020 Mississippi State Bulldogs baseball game log
Regular season (12–4)

February (7–3)
Date	Opponent	Rank	Site/stadium	Score	Win	Loss	Save	TV	Attendance	Overall record	SEC record
February 14	Wright State	No. 10	Dudy Noble Field • Starkville, MS	**W** 9–6	**Chase Patrick (1–0)**	Daniel Kreuzer (0–1)	**Jared Shemper (1)**	SECN+	9,509	1–0	–
February 15	Wright State	No. 10	Dudy Noble Field • Starkville, MS	**W** 6–2	**Christian MacLeod (1–0)**	Bradley Brehmer (0–1)	none	SECN+	11,006	2–0	–
February 16	Wright State	No. 10	Dudy Noble Field • Starkville, MS	**W** 5–1	**Eric Cerantola (1–0)**	Austin Cline (0–1)	none	SECN+	8,173	3–0	–
February 18	Samford	No. 10	Dudy Noble Field • Starkville, MS	**canceled, impending weather**							
February 21	Oregon State	No. 10	Dudy Noble Field • Starkville, MS	**W** 6–2	**David Dunlavey (1–0)**	Cooper Hjerpe (0–1)	none	SECN+	8,297	4–0	–
February 22	Oregon State	No. 10	Dudy Noble Field • Starkville, MS	**W** 7–4	**Christian MacLeod (2–0)**	Jake Pfennigs (1–1)	none	SECN+	12,034	5–0	–
February 23	Oregon State	No. 10	Dudy Noble Field • Starkville, MS	**L** 2–7	Cooper Hjerpe (1–1)	**Jared Shemper (0–1)**	none	SECN+	8,209	5–1	–
February 25	Texas Southern	No. 8	Dudy Noble Field • Starkville, MS	**L** 4–8	Camden Guarnere (1–0)	**David Dunlavey (1–1)**	Jesse Garcia (1)	SECN+	8,160	5–2	–
February 26	Alcorn State	No. 8	Dudy Noble Field • Starkville, MS	**W** 8–4	**Chase Patrick (2–0)**	George Osborne III (0–1)	none	SECN+	6,834	6–2	–
February 28	at No. 25 Long Beach State	No. 8	Blair Field • Long Beach, CA	**L** 0–4	Adam Seminaris (1–0)	**Carlisle Koestler (0–1)**	none	BigWest.TV	1,832	6–3	–
February 29	at No. 25 Long Beach State	No. 8	Blair Field • Long Beach, CA	**W** 9–0	**Christian MacLeod (3–0)**	Alfredo Ruiz (2–1)	**Will Bednar (1)**	BigWest.TV	1,779	7–3	–

March (5–1)
Date	Opponent	Rank	Site/stadium	Score	Win	Loss	Save	TV	Attendance	Overall record	SEC record
March 1	at No. 25 Long Beach State	No. 8	Blair Field • Long Beach, CA	**L** 2–6	Luis Ramirez (2–0)	**Eric Cerantola (1–1)**	Matt Fields (1)	BigWest.TV	1,625	7–4	–
March 4	vs. Southern Miss	No. 18	Trustmark Park • Pearl, MS	**canceled, inclement weather**							
March 6	Quinnipiac	No. 18	Dudy Noble Field • Starkville, MS	**W** 5–1	**Christian MacLeod (4–0)**	Christian Nicolosi (0–2)	none	SECN+	7,518	8–4	–
March 7	Quinnipiac	No. 18	Dudy Noble Field • Starkville, MS	**W** 5–4	**Landon Sims (1–0)**	David Longstreeth (0–1)	none	SECN+	8,909	9–4	–
March 8	Quinnipiac	No. 18	Dudy Noble Field • Starkville, MS	**W** 8–4	**David Dunlavey (2–1)**	Colin Donnelly (0–2)	none	SECN+	7,405	10–4	–
March 10	vs. No. 4 Texas Tech	No. 17	MGM Park • Biloxi, MS	**W** 6–3	**Houston Harding (1–0)**	Mason Montgomery (3–1)	**Spencer Price (1)**	SECN+	5,752	11–4	–
March 11	vs. No. 4 Texas Tech	No. 17	MGM Park • Biloxi, MS	**W** 3–2	**Riley Self (1–0)**	Jakob Brustoski (1–1)	**Spencer Price (2)**	SECN+	6,029	12–4	–
March 13	No. 14 Arkansas	No. 17	Dudy Noble Field • Starkville, MS	**canceled, due to the COVID-19 pandemic**							
March 14	No. 14 Arkansas	No. 17	Dudy Noble Field • Starkville, MS	**canceled due to the COVID-19 pandemic**							
March 15	No. 14 Arkansas	No. 17	Dudy Noble Field • Starkville, MS	**canceled due to the COVID-19 pandemic**							
March 18	at Southeastern Louisiana		Pat Kenelly Diamond at Alumni Field • Hammond, LA	**canceled due to the COVID-19 pandemic**							
March 20	at LSU		Alex Box Stadium • Baton Rouge, LA	**canceled due to the COVID-19 pandemic**							
March 21	at LSU		Alex Box Stadium • Baton Rouge, LA	**canceled due to the COVID-19 pandemic**							
March 22	at LSU		Alex Box Stadium • Baton Rouge, LA	**canceled due to the COVID-19 pandemic**							
March 24	at UAB		Regions Field • Birmingham, AL	**canceled due to the COVID-19 pandemic**							
March 27	Kentucky		Dudy Noble Field • Starkville, MS	**canceled due to the COVID-19 pandemic**							
March 28	Kentucky		Dudy Noble Field • Starkville, MS	**canceled due to the COVID-19 pandemic**							
March 29	Kentucky		Dudy Noble Field • Starkville, MS	**canceled due to the COVID-19 pandemic**							
March 31	at Memphis		AutoZone Park • Memphis, TN	**canceled due to the COVID-19 pandemic**							

April
Date	Opponent	Rank	Site/stadium	Score	Win	Loss	Save	TV	Attendance	Overall record	SEC record
April 3	at Auburn		Plainsman Park • Auburn, AL	canceled due to the COVID-19 pandemic							
April 4	at Auburn		Plainsman Park • Auburn, AL	canceled due to the COVID-19 pandemic							
April 5	at Auburn		Plainsman Park • Auburn, AL	canceled due to the COVID-19 pandemic							
April 7	UT Martin		Dudy Noble Field • Starkville, MS	canceled due to the COVID-19 pandemic							
April 9	Ole Miss		Dudy Noble Field • Starkville, MS	canceled due to the COVID-19 pandemic							
April 10	Ole Miss		Dudy Noble Field • Starkville, MS	canceled due to the COVID-19 pandemic							
April 11	Ole Miss		Dudy Noble Field • Starkville, MS	canceled due to the COVID-19 pandemic							
April 14	South Alabama		Dudy Noble Field • Starkville, MS	canceled due to the COVID-19 pandemic							
April 16	at South Carolina		Founders Park • Columbia, SC	canceled due to the COVID-19 pandemic							
April 17	at South Carolina		Founders Park • Columbia, SC	canceled due to the COVID-19 pandemic							
April 18	at South Carolina		Founders Park • Columbia, SC	canceled due to the COVID-19 pandemic							
April 21	vs. Ole Miss; Governor's Cup		Trustmark Park • Pearl, MS	canceled due to the COVID-19 pandemic							
April 24	Texas A&M		Dudy Noble Field • Starkville, MS	canceled due to the COVID-19 pandemic							
April 25	Texas A&M		Dudy Noble Field • Starkville, MS	canceled due to the COVID-19 pandemic							
April 26	Texas A&M		Dudy Noble Field • Starkville, MS	canceled due to the COVID-19 pandemic							

May
Date	Opponent	Rank	Site/stadium	Score	Win	Loss	Save	TV	Attendance	Overall record	SEC record
May 1	at Alabama		Sewell–Thomas Stadium • Tuscaloosa, AL	canceled due to the COVID-19 pandemic							
May 2	at Alabama		Sewell–Thomas Stadium • Tuscaloosa, AL	canceled due to the COVID-19 pandemic							
May 3	at Alabama		Sewell–Thomas Stadium • Tuscaloosa, AL	canceled due to the COVID-19 pandemic							
May 5	Southern		Dudy Noble Field • Starkville, MS	canceled due to the COVID-19 pandemic							
May 8	Missouri		Dudy Noble Field • Starkville, MS	canceled due to the COVID-19 pandemic							
May 9	Missouri		Dudy Noble Field • Starkville, MS	canceled due to the COVID-19 pandemic							
May 10	Missouri		Dudy Noble Field • Starkville, MS	canceled due to the COVID-19 pandemic							
May 12	North Alabama		Dudy Noble Field • Starkville, MS	canceled due to the COVID-19 pandemic							
May 14	at Vanderbilt		Hawkins Field • Nashville, TN	canceled due to the COVID-19 pandemic							
May 15	at Vanderbilt		Hawkins Field • Nashville, TN	canceled due to the COVID-19 pandemic							
May 16	at Vanderbilt		Hawkins Field • Nashville, TN	canceled due to the COVID-19 pandemic							

Post-season

SEC Tournament
Date	Opponent	Seed	Site/stadium	Score	Win	Loss	Save	TV	Attendance	Overall record	SECT Record
May 19–24			Hoover Metropolitan Stadium • Hoover, AL	**canceled due to the COVID-19 pandemic**							

Legend: = Win = Loss = Cancelled
Bold = Mississippi State team member

Schedule source:

*Rankings are based on the team's current ranking in the D1Baseball poll.

== Rankings ==
Ranking movements Legend: ██ Increase in ranking ██ Decrease in ranking
	Week																
Poll	Pre	1	2	3	4	5	6	7	8	9	10	11	12	13	14	15	Final
Coaches'	6	6*		19	17												
Baseball America	9	9	4	12	13												
Collegiate Baseball^	6	6	6	12	10												
NCBWA†	9	7	6	13													
D1Baseball	10	10	8	18	17												

^ Collegiate Baseball ranked 40 teams in their preseason poll, but only ranked 30 teams weekly during the season.
† NCBWA ranks 30 teams in their preseason poll, but only ranks 25 teams weekly during the season.
* A new poll was not released for this week, so for comparison purposes, the previous week's ranking is inserted in this week's slot.

== MLB draft ==
Player	Position	Round	Overall	MLB team
Justin Foscue	2B/3B	1	14	Texas Rangers
Jordan Westburg	SS	1†	30	Baltimore Orioles
J. T. Ginn‡	RHP	2	52	New York Mets

There were only 5 rounds in the 2020 draft.

†Competitive Balance Round A
‡J.T. Ginn was drafted out of high school as the 30th overall pick but honored his commitment to Mississippi State. He had Tommy John surgery in March 2020.
