= 2020 South Carolina Gamecocks baseball team =

American college baseball season

2020 South Carolina Gamecocks baseball
- Conference: Southeastern Conference
- Eastern Division
- Record: 12–4 (0–0 SEC)
- Head coach: Mark Kingston (3rd season)
- Assistant coaches: Trip Couch; Skylar Meade; Stuart Lake
- Home stadium: Founders Park

2020 Southeastern Conference baseball standings
	Conf.				Overall
Team	W		L	PCT	W		L	PCT
Eastern
No. 1 Florida ‍‍‍	0	–	0	–	16	–	1	.941
Tennessee ‍‍‍	0	–	0	–	15	–	2	.882
No. 3 Georgia ‍‍‍	0	–	0	–	14	–	4	.778
South Carolina ‍‍‍	0	–	0	–	12	–	4	.750
No. 6 Vanderbilt ‍‍‍	0	–	0	–	13	–	5	.722
Missouri • ‍‍‍	0	–	0	–	11	–	5	.688
Kentucky ‍‍‍	0	–	0	–	11	–	6	.647
Western
No. 8 Ole Miss ‍‍‍	0	–	0	–	16	–	1	.941
Alabama ‍‍‍	0	–	0	–	16	–	1	.941
Texas A&M ‍‍‍	0	–	0	–	15	–	3	.833
No. 17 Mississippi State ‍‍‍	0	–	0	–	12	–	4	.750
No. 18 Auburn ‍‍‍	0	–	0	–	13	–	5	.722
No. 19 LSU ‍‍‍	0	–	0	–	12	–	5	.706
No. 14 Arkansas ‍‍‍	0	–	0	–	11	–	5	.688
‡ – Tournament champion – ineligible for postseason due to NCAA sanctions As of March 12, 2020; Rankings from D1Baseball

The 2020 South Carolina Gamecocks baseball team represented the University of South Carolina in the 2020 NCAA Division I baseball season. The Gamecocks played their home games at Founders Park, and were led by third-year head coach Mark Kingston.

== Previous season ==
The Gamecocks finished 28–28 overall, and 8–22 in the conference.

== Personnel ==
=== Roster ===
2020 South Carolina Gamecocks roster
Pitchers: 13 - Graham Lawson - (redshirt) Senior; 15 - Daniel Lloyd - Sophomore; 16 - John Gilreath - Junior; 20 - Andrew Peters - Junior; 21 - Carmen Mlodzinski - (redshirt) Sophomore; 22 - Brannon Jordan - Junior; 30 - Brett Thomas - Freshman; 34 - Thomas Farr - (redshirt) Sophomore; 35 - RJ Dantin - Freshman; 36 - TJ Shook - Junior; 37 - Cam Tringali - Sophomore; 39 - Will McGregor - Freshman; 40 - Wesley Sweatt - Sophomore; 43 - Hayden Lehman - (redshirt) Junior; 44 - Parker Coyne - Junior; 45 - Trey Tujetsch - Freshman; 47 - Dylan Harley - Sophomore; 49 - Brett Kerry - Sophomore	Catchers: 10 - Colin Burgess - Freshman; 28 - Wes Clarke - Sophomore; Infielders: 3 - Braylen Wimmer - Freshman; 6 - George Callil - Senior; 7 - Brennan Milone - Freshman; 14 - Noah Campbell - Junior	Outfielders: 9 - Noah Myers - Junior; 11 - Andrew Eyster - Junior; 32 - Anthony Amicangelo - Junior; 33 - Brady Allen - Sophomore; Utility: 8 - Jeff Heinrich (INF/OF) - Junior; 12 - Josiah Sightler (INF/P) - Sophomore; 18 - Julian Bosnic (P/OF) - (redshirt) Freshman; 26 - Jax Cash (C/P) - Freshman; 29 - Bryant Bowen (C/INF) - Graduate Student; 38 - Dallas Beaver (C/INF) - Graduate Student

=== Coaching staff ===
2020 South Carolina Gamecocks coaching staff
Name	Position
Mark Kingston	Head coach
Trip Couch	Assistant Coach
Skylar Meade	Assistant Coach
Stuart Lake	Assistant Coach
Mike Current	Director of Baseball Player Development
Wesley Turner	Director of Operations
Sawyer Bridges	Student Assistant Coach

== Schedule and results ==
2020 South Carolina Gamecocks baseball game log
Regular season

February
Date	Opponent	Rank	Site/stadium	Score	Win	Loss	Save	TV	Attendance	Overall record	SEC record
February 14	Holy Cross		Founders Park; Columbia, SC	**W** 10–0	**C. Mlodzinski (1–0)**	G. Keough (0–1)		SECN+	6,410	1–0	
February 15	Holy Cross		Founders Park	**W** 9–4	**B. Kerry (1–0)**	L. Dawson (0–1)	**D. Lloyd (1)**	SECN+	6,167	2–0	
February 16	Holy Cross		Founders Park	**W** 5–0^{(5)}	**B. Jordan (1–0)**	L. Dvorak (0–1)		SECN+	5,437	3–0	
February 18	Winthrop	**Cancelled due to weather.**									
February 19	Presbyterian		Founders Park	**W** 14–3	**T. Farr (1–0)**	G. Stoneking (0–1)			5,222	4–0	
February 21	Northwestern		Founders Park	**L** 2–5^{(10)}	S. Lawrence (1–0)	**D. Lloyd (0–1)**			5,406	4–1	
February 22	Northwestern		Founders Park	**W** 12–3	**B. Kerry (2–0)**	Q. Lavelle (0–2)			5,834	5–1	
February 23	Northwestern		Founders Park	**L** 3–4^{(10)}	C. Moe (1–0)	**G. Lawson (0–1)**	J. Pagliarini (1)		5,603	5–2	
February 25	North Florida		Founders Park								
February 28	Clemson		Founders Park								
February 29	vs. Clemson		Segra Park; Columbia, SC								

March
Date	Opponent	Rank	Site/stadium	Score	Win	Loss	Save	TV	Attendance	Overall record	SEC record
March 1	at Clemson		Doug Kingsmore Stadium; Clemson, SC								
March 3	at Furman		Fluor Field at the West End; Greenville, SC								
March 4	Boston College		Founders Park								
March 6	Cornell		Founders Park								
March 7	Cornell		Founders Park								
March 8	Cornell		Founders Park								
March 10	The Citadel		Founders Park								
March 13	Tennessee		Founders Park								
March 14	Tennessee		Founders Park								
March 15	Tennessee		Founders Park								
March 18	vs. NC State		BB&T Ballpark; Charlotte, NC								
March 20	at Georgia		Foley Field; Athens, GA								
March 21	at Georgia		Foley Field								
March 22	at Georgia		Foley Field								
March 24	Charleston Southern		Founders Park								
March 27	Missouri		Founders Park								
March 28	Missouri		Founders Park								
March 29	Missouri		Founders Park								
March 31	vs. Appalachian State		BB&T Ballpark								

April
Date	Opponent	Rank	Site/stadium	Score	Win	Loss	Save	TV	Attendance	Overall record	SEC record
April 3	at Ole Miss		Swayze Field; Oxford, MS								
April 4	at Ole Miss		Swayze Field								
April 5	at Ole Miss		Swayze Field								
April 7	vs. North Carolina		BB&T Ballpark								
April 10	at Vanderbilt		Hawkins Field; Nashville, TN								
April 11	at Vanderbilt		Hawkins Field								
April 12	at Vanderbilt		Hawkins Field								
April 14	North Carolina A&T		Founders Park								
April 16	Mississippi State		Founders Park								
April 17	Mississippi State		Founders Park								
April 18	Mississippi State		Founders Park								
April 21	at The Citadel		Joseph P. Riley Jr. Park; Charleston, SC								
April 24	at LSU		Alex Box Stadium; Baton Rouge, LA								
April 25	at LSU		Alex Box Stadium								
April 26	at LSU		Alex Box Stadium								
April 28	Furman		Founders Park								

May
Date	Opponent	Rank	Site/stadium	Score	Win	Loss	Save	TV	Attendance	Overall record	SEC record
May 1	Arkansas		Founders Park								
May 2	Arkansas		Founders Park								
May 3	Arkansas		Founders Park								
May 8	at Kentucky		Kentucky Proud Park; Lexington, KY								
May 9	at Kentucky		Kentucky Proud Park								
May 10	at Kentucky		Kentucky Proud Park								
May 12	vs. USC Upstate		SRP Park; North Augusta, SC								
May 14	Florida		Founders Park								
May 15	Florida		Founders Park								
May 16	Florida		Founders Park								

Postseason

SEC Tournament
Date	Opponent	Seed	Site/stadium	Score	Win	Loss	Save	TV	Attendance	Overall record	SECT Record
May 19–24			Hoover Metropolitan Stadium; Hoover, AL								

Legend: = Win = Loss = Cancelled
Bold = South Carolina team member

Schedule source:

*Rankings are based on the team's current ranking in the D1Baseball poll.

== 2020 MLB draft ==
Player	Position	Round	Overall	MLB team
Carmen Mlodzinski	RHP	A	31	Pittsburgh Pirates
