= 2020 LSU Tigers baseball team =

2020 season of Louisiana State University baseball team

2020 LSU Tigers baseball
- Conference: Southeastern Conference
- Western Division

Ranking
- Coaches: No. 22 (tie)
- CB: No. 22
- Record: 12–5 (0–0 SEC)
- Head coach: Paul Mainieri (14th season)
- Assistant coaches: Alan Dunn; Nolan Cain; Eddie Smith
- Home stadium: Alex Box Stadium

2020 Southeastern Conference baseball standings
	Conf.				Overall
Team	W		L	PCT	W		L	PCT
Eastern
No. 1 Florida ‍‍‍	0	–	0	–	16	–	1	.941
Tennessee ‍‍‍	0	–	0	–	15	–	2	.882
No. 3 Georgia ‍‍‍	0	–	0	–	14	–	4	.778
South Carolina ‍‍‍	0	–	0	–	12	–	4	.750
No. 6 Vanderbilt ‍‍‍	0	–	0	–	13	–	5	.722
Missouri • ‍‍‍	0	–	0	–	11	–	5	.688
Kentucky ‍‍‍	0	–	0	–	11	–	6	.647
Western
No. 8 Ole Miss ‍‍‍	0	–	0	–	16	–	1	.941
Alabama ‍‍‍	0	–	0	–	16	–	1	.941
Texas A&M ‍‍‍	0	–	0	–	15	–	3	.833
No. 17 Mississippi State ‍‍‍	0	–	0	–	12	–	4	.750
No. 18 Auburn ‍‍‍	0	–	0	–	13	–	5	.722
No. 19 LSU ‍‍‍	0	–	0	–	12	–	5	.706
No. 14 Arkansas ‍‍‍	0	–	0	–	11	–	5	.688
‡ – Tournament champion – ineligible for postseason due to NCAA sanctions As of March 12, 2020; Rankings from D1Baseball

The 2020 LSU Tigers baseball team represented Louisiana State University in the 2020 NCAA Division I baseball season. The Tigers played their home games at Alex Box Stadium.

On March 11, the Southeastern Conference released a news statement announcing the restriction of fans at all SEC home spring athletic games, including baseball. On March 12, the Southeastern Conference released a new statement announcing the suspension of all athletics until as early as March 30. These announcements came after the COVID-19 pandemic has swept throughout the United States. On March 16, Louisiana governor John Bel Edwards announced the cancelation, closure, and postponements for facilities and events with more than 50 people until April 13, thus stopping all baseball games in the state of Louisiana until that date.

== Previous season ==
The Tigers finished 40–26 overall, and 17–13 in the conference. The Tigers won the Baton Rouge Regional in the 2019 NCAA Division I baseball tournament before losing the Baton Rouge Super Regional to Florida State.

== Preseason ==
=== SEC Coaches poll ===
The SEC coaches poll was released on February 6, 2020 with the Tigers predicted to finish tied for third in the Western Division.

Media poll (West)
Predicted finish	Team	Votes (1st place)
1	Arkansas	82 (5)
2	Mississippi State	73 (4)
T–3	Auburn	67 (2)
T–3	LSU	67 (3)
5	Texas A&M	44
6	Ole Miss	38
7	Alabama	21

=== Preseason All-SEC teams ===
First Team

- Cade Beloso – First Baseman
- Daniel Cabrera – Outfielder

== Personnel ==
=== Roster ===
2020 LSU Tigers roster
Pitchers: 10 - Eric Walker - Junior; 11 - Landon Marceaux - Sophomore; 18 - Cole Henry - Sophomore; 21 - Nick Storz - Sophomore; 26 - AJ Labas - Sophomore; 27 - Matthew Beck - Senior; 28 - Devin Fontenot - Junior; 29 - Chase Costello - Sophomore; 30 - Trent Vietmeier - Junior; 32 - Aaron George - Senior; 37 - Brandon Kaminer - Junior; 44 - Jaden Hill - Sophomore; 46 - Rye Gunter - Sophomore; 47 - Jacob Hasty - Freshman; 52 - Ma'Khail Hilliard - Junior; 57 - Michael Lagarrigue - Sophomore	Catchers: 13 - Saul Garza - Junior; 20 - Alex Milazzo - Freshman; 25 - Hayden Travinski - Freshman; 45 - Braden Doughty - Junior; Infielders: 2 - Zach Arnold - Freshman; 3 - Hal Hughes - Junior; 4 - Cade Doughty - Freshman; 16 - Collier Cranford - Freshman; 17 - Zack Mathis - Junior; 24 - Cade Beloso - Sophomore; 38 - Tom Biggs - Freshman	Outfielders: 7 - Giovanni Digiacomo - Sophomore; 8 - Daniel Cabrera - Junior; 9 - Wes Toups - Freshman; 14 - Maurice Hampton Jr. - Freshman; 22 - Mitchell Sanford - Freshman; Utility: 5 - Drew Bianco (INF/OF) - Sophomore; 6 - Gavin Dugas (INF/OF) - Sophomore; 23 - CJ Willis (1B/OF) - Sophomore

=== Coaching staff ===
2020 LSU Tigers coaching staff
Name	Position
Paul Mainieri	Head coach
Alan Dunn	Associate head coach
Nolan Cain	Assistant Coach/recruiting coordinator
Eddie Smith	Hitting Coach
Nate Fury	Director of Baseball Operations
Travis Roy	Strength and conditioning coordinator
Jamie Tutko	Director of Video and Scouting
Hunter Kiel	Undergraduate Assistant Coach
Cory Couture	Sr. Associate Athletic Trainer

== Schedule and results ==
2020 LSU Tigers baseball game log
Regular season

February (7–4)
Date	Opponent	Rank	Site/stadium	Score	Win	Loss	Save	TV	Attendance	Overall record	SEC record
February 14	Indiana	No. 11	Alex Box Stadium; Baton Rouge, LA	**W** 8–1	**Henry** (1–0)	Sommer (0–1)	None	SECN+	11,421	1–0	–
February 15	Indiana	No. 11	Alex Box Stadium	**W** 7–4	**Vietmeier** (1–0)	Bierman (0–1)	**Fontenot** (1)	SECN+	10,859	2–0	–
February 15	Indiana	No. 11	Alex Box Stadium	**L** 2–7	Tucker (1–0)	**Labas** (0–1)	None	SECN+	10,508	2–1	–
February 18	Southern	No. 11	Alex Box Stadium	**W** 8–3	**Hilliard** (1–0)	Page (0–2)	None	SECN+	9,761	3–1	–
February 19	at Nicholls	No. 11	Ray E. Didier Field; Thibodaux, LA	**L** 2–4	Theriot (1–0)	**Walker** (0–1)	Taylor (1)	CST	2,641	3–2	–
February 21	Eastern Kentucky	No. 11	Alex Box Stadium	**L** 0–2	Davenport III (1–0)	**Henry** (1–1)	Abbott (2)	SECN+	9,806	3–3	–
February 22	Eastern Kentucky	No. 11	Alex Box Stadium	**W** 6–3	**Marceaux** (1–0)	Ferris (0–1)	**Fontenot** (2)	SECN+	10,381	4–3	–
February 23	Eastern Kentucky	No. 11	Alex Box Stadium	**W** 10–2	**Labas** (1–1)	Lewis (1–1)	None	SECN+	9,868	5–3	–
February 26	Louisiana Tech	No. 11	Alex Box Stadium	**W** 7–1	**Kaminer** (1–0)	Martinez (1–1)	None	SECN+	9,912	6–3	–
February 28	vs. Texas; Shriners College Classic	No. 11	Minute Maid Park; Houston, TX	**W** 4–3	**Henry** (2–1)	Elder (2–1)	**Hill** (1)	CST	15,735	7–3	–
February 29	vs. Baylor; Shriners College Classic	No. 11	Minute Maid Park	**L** 4–6	Leckich (1–0)	**Kaminer** (1–1)	Boyd (4)	CST	N/A	7–4	–

March
Date	Opponent	Rank	Site/stadium	Score	Win	Loss	Save	TV	Attendance	Overall record	SEC record
March 1	vs. No. 22 Oklahoma; Shriners College Classic	No. 11	Minute Maid Park	**L** 0–1	Acker (1–1)	**Labas** (1–2)	None	CST	N/A	7–5	–
March 3	Southeastern Louisiana	No. 21	Alex Box Stadium	**W** 6–3	**Kaminer** (2–1)	Dugas (0–3)	**Fontenot** (3)	SECN+	10,065	8–5	–
March 6	UMass Lowell	No. 21	Alex Box Stadium	**W** 11–2	**Beck** (1–0)	Funaro (0–2)	None	SECN+	10,254	9–5	–
March 7	UMass Lowell	No. 21	Alex Box Stadium	**W** 12–2	**Marceaux** (2–0)	Duffley (1–3)	**Hill** (2)	SECN+	10,684	10–5	–
March 8	UMass Lowell	No. 21	Alex Box Stadium	**W** 6–4	**Fontenot** (1–0)	Becker (0–2)	None	SECN+	10,321	11–5	–
March 11	South Alabama	No. 19	Alex Box Stadium	**W** 4–1				SECN+		12–5	–
March 13	at Ole Miss		Swayze Field; Oxford, MS	Canceled due to the COVID-19 pandemic							
March 14	at Ole Miss		Swayze Field	Canceled due to the COVID-19 Pandemic							
March 15	at Ole Miss		Swayze Field	Canceled due to the COVID-19 Pandemic							
March 18	St. Thomas (FL)		Alex Box Stadium	Canceled due to the COVID-19 Pandemic							
March 20	Mississippi State		Alex Box Stadium	Canceled due to the COVID-19 Pandemic							
March 21	Mississippi State		Alex Box Stadium	Canceled due to the COVID-19 Pandemic							
March 22	Mississippi State		Alex Box Stadium	Canceled due to the COVID-19 Pandemic							
March 24	Tulane		Alex Box Stadium	Canceled due to the COVID-19 Pandemic							
March 27	at Tennessee		Lindsey Nelson Stadium; Knoxville, TN	Canceled due to the COVID-19 Pandemic							
March 28	at Tennessee		Lindsey Nelson Stadium	Canceled due to the COVID-19 Pandemic							
March 29	at Tennessee		Lindsey Nelson Stadium	Canceled due to the COVID-19 Pandemic							

April
Date	Opponent	Rank	Site/stadium	Score	Win	Loss	Save	TV	Attendance	Overall record	SEC record
April 1	Louisiana–Monroe		Alex Box Stadium	Canceled due to the COVID-19 Pandemic							
April 3	Vanderbilt		Alex Box Stadium	Canceled due to the COVID-19 Pandemic							
April 4	Vanderbilt		Alex Box Stadium	Canceled due to the COVID-19 Pandemic							
April 5	Vanderbilt		Alex Box Stadium	Canceled due to the COVID-19 Pandemic							
April 7	Louisiana		Alex Box Stadium	Canceled due to the COVID-19 Pandemic							
April 9	at Kentucky		Kentucky Proud Park; Lexington, KY	Canceled due to the COVID-19 Pandemic							
April 10	at Kentucky		Kentucky Proud Park	Canceled due to the COVID-19 Pandemic							
April 11	at Kentucky		Kentucky Proud Park	Canceled due to the COVID-19 Pandemic							
April 13	Grambling State		Alex Box Stadium	Canceled due to the COVID-19 Pandemic							
April 14	McNeese State		Alex Box Stadium	Canceled due to the COVID-19 Pandemic							
April 17	Arkansas		Alex Box Stadium	Canceled due to the COVID-19 Pandemic							
April 18	Arkansas		Alex Box Stadium	Canceled due to the COVID-19 Pandemic							
April 19	Arkansas		Alex Box Stadium	Canceled due to the COVID-19 Pandemic							
April 21	Lamar		Alex Box Stadium	Canceled due to the COVID-19 Pandemic							
April 24	South Carolina		Alex Box Stadium	Canceled due to the COVID-19 Pandemic							
April 25	South Carolina		Alex Box Stadium	Canceled due to the COVID-19 Pandemic							
April 26	South Carolina		Alex Box Stadium	Canceled due to the COVID-19 Pandemic							
April 28	Northwestern State		Alex Box Stadium	Canceled due to the COVID-19 Pandemic							

May
Date	Opponent	Rank	Site/stadium	Score	Win	Loss	Save	TV	Attendance	Overall record	SEC record
May 1	at Texas A&M		Olsen Field at Blue Bell Park; College Station, TX	Canceled due to the COVID-19 Pandemic							
May 2	at Texas A&M		Olsen Field at Blue Bell Park	Canceled due to the COVID-19 Pandemic							
May 3	at Texas A&M		Olsen Field at Blue Bell Park	Canceled due to the COVID-19 Pandemic							
May 8	Alabama		Alex Box Stadium	Canceled due to the COVID-19 Pandemic							
May 9	Alabama		Alex Box Stadium	Canceled due to the COVID-19 Pandemic							
May 10	Alabama		Alex Box Stadium	Canceled due to the COVID-19 Pandemic							
May 12	New Orleans		Alex Box Stadium	Canceled due to the COVID-19 Pandemic							
May 14	at Auburn		Plainsman Park; Auburn, AL	Canceled due to the COVID-19 Pandemic							
May 15	at Auburn		Plainsman Park	Canceled due to the COVID-19 Pandemic							
May 16	at Auburn		Plainsman Park	Canceled due to the COVID-19 Pandemic							

Post-Season

SEC Tournament
Date	Opponent	Seed	Site/stadium	Score	Win	Loss	Save	TV	Attendance	Overall record	SECT record
May 19–24			Hoover Metropolitan Stadium; Hoover, AL	Canceled due to the COVID-19 Pandemic							

Legend: = Win = Loss = Cancelled/Suspended
Bold = LSU team member

Schedule source:

*Rankings are based on the team's current ranking in the D1Baseball poll.

== Rankings ==
Ranking movements Legend: ██ Increase in ranking ██ Decrease in ranking
	Week																
Poll	Pre	1	2	3	4	5	6	7	8	9	10	11	12	13	14	15	Final
Coaches'	12	12*		22	19												
Baseball America	14	13	14	20	20												
Collegiate Baseball^	11	12	19	22	19												
NCBWA†	13	13	16	21	18												
D1Baseball	11	11	11	21	19												

^ Collegiate Baseball ranked 40 teams in their preseason poll, but only ranked 30 teams weekly during the season.
† NCBWA ranks 30 teams in their preseason poll, but only ranks 25 teams weekly during the season.
* A new poll was not released for this week, so for comparison purposes, the previous week's ranking is inserted in this week's slot.

== 2020 MLB draft ==
Player	Position	Round	Overall	MLB team
Cole Henry	RHP	2	55	Washington Nationals
Daniel Cabrera	OF	B	62	Detroit Tigers
