= 2020 Kentucky Wildcats baseball team =

2020 season of University of Kentucky baseball team

2020 Kentucky Wildcats baseball
- Conference: Southeastern Conference
- Eastern Division
- Record: 11–6 (0–0 SEC)
- Head coach: Nick Mingione (4th season)
- Assistant coaches: Will Coggin; Dan Roszel
- Home stadium: Kentucky Proud Park

2020 Southeastern Conference baseball standings
	Conf.				Overall
Team	W		L	PCT	W		L	PCT
Eastern
No. 1 Florida ‍‍‍	0	–	0	–	16	–	1	.941
Tennessee ‍‍‍	0	–	0	–	15	–	2	.882
No. 3 Georgia ‍‍‍	0	–	0	–	14	–	4	.778
South Carolina ‍‍‍	0	–	0	–	12	–	4	.750
No. 6 Vanderbilt ‍‍‍	0	–	0	–	13	–	5	.722
Missouri • ‍‍‍	0	–	0	–	11	–	5	.688
Kentucky ‍‍‍	0	–	0	–	11	–	6	.647
Western
No. 8 Ole Miss ‍‍‍	0	–	0	–	16	–	1	.941
Alabama ‍‍‍	0	–	0	–	16	–	1	.941
Texas A&M ‍‍‍	0	–	0	–	15	–	3	.833
No. 17 Mississippi State ‍‍‍	0	–	0	–	12	–	4	.750
No. 18 Auburn ‍‍‍	0	–	0	–	13	–	5	.722
No. 19 LSU ‍‍‍	0	–	0	–	12	–	5	.706
No. 14 Arkansas ‍‍‍	0	–	0	–	11	–	5	.688
‡ – Tournament champion – ineligible for postseason due to NCAA sanctions As of March 12, 2020; Rankings from D1Baseball

The 2020 Kentucky Wildcats baseball team represented the University of Kentucky in the 2020 NCAA Division I baseball season. The Wildcats played their home games at Kentucky Proud Park. On March 17, 2020, the Southeastern Conference canceled all intercollegiate sports for member institutions due to the COVID-19 pandemic, which terminated the season.

== Previous season ==
The Wildcats finished 26–29 overall, and 7–23 in the conference.

=== 2019 MLB draft ===
The Wildcats had three players drafted in the 2019 MLB draft.

Player	Position	Round	Overall	MLB Team
Zack Thompson	Pitcher	1	19	St. Louis Cardinals
Carson Coleman	Pitcher	33	998	Tampa Bay Rays
Ryan Shinn	Outfield	34	1018	New York Mets
**Sam Wibbels**	Pitcher	36	1083	Washington Nationals
**Jaden Brown**	Shortstop	40	1203	Washington Nationals

Players in bold are signees drafted from high school that will attend Kentucky.

== Personnel ==
=== Roster ===
2020 Kentucky Wildcats roster
**Pitchers**: 3 – Ben Jordan – (redshirt) Sophomore; 11 – Trip Lockhart – Junior; 16 – Will Gambino – (redshirt) Freshman; 19 – Jake Tate – Freshman; 20 – Braxton Cottongame – Sophomore; 22 – Dillon Marsh – Sophomore; 31 – Alex Degen – Sophomore; 34 – Carson Coleman – (redshirt) Junior; 35 – Cole Daniels – Sophomore; 36 – Ron Cole – Freshman; 38 – Jimmy Ramsey – Junior; 39 – Hunter Rigsby – Sophomore; 41 – Alex Margot – Freshman; 43 – Harrison Cook – Freshman; 46 – Sam Wibbels – Freshman; 48 – Zack Lee – Freshman; 49 – Cole Stupp – Freshman; 50 – Mason Hazelwood – Junior; 54 – Daniel Harper – Junior; 55 – Tyler Burchett – Sophomore	**Catchers**: 8 – Tanner Holen – Senior; 13 – Brendan Hord – (redshirt) Freshman; 44 – Jared Payne – Freshman; **Infielders**: 2 – Austin Schultz – Sophomore; 4 – Zeke Lewis – (redshirt) Senior; 5 – T.J. Collett – Senior; 6 – Jaden Brown – Freshman; 7 – Drew Grace – Freshman; 10 – Matt Golda – Junior; 12 – Chase Estep – Freshman; 33 – Trae Harmon – Sophomore; 42 – Elliott Curtis – Senior	**Outfielders**: 1 – John Rhodes – Freshman; 28 – Oraj Anu – Junior; 30 – Jaren Shelby – Senior; 37 – Cam Hill – (redshirt) Sophomore; 51 – Chase Bryan – Junior; **Utility**: 9 – Breydon Daniel (INF/OF) – Senior; 23 – Justin Olson (INF/OF) – (redshirt) Freshman; 25 – Coltyn Kessler (C/INF) – Junior

=== Coaching staff ===
2020 Kentucky Wildcats coaching staff
Name	Position
Nick Mingione	Head coach
Dan Roszel	Assistant Coach/Pitching
Will Coggin	Assistant Coach/Recruiting Coordinator
Todd Guilliams	Volunteer Assistant Coach

== Schedule and results ==
2020 Kentucky Wildcats baseball game log
Regular season

February
Date	Opponent	Rank	Site/stadium	Score	Win	Loss	Save	TV	Attendance	Overall record	SEC record
February 14	at TCU		Lupton Stadium; Fort Worth, TX	1–5	Haylen (1–0)	**Ramsey** (0–1)	None		3,879	0–1	–
February 15	at TCU		Lupton Stadium	1–7	Krob (1–0)	**Stupp** (0–1)	None		3,986	0–2	–
February 16	at TCU		Lupton Stadium	5–10	Hill (1–0)	**Marsh** (0–1)	None		4,030	0–3	–
February 18	Southeast Missouri State		Kentucky Proud Park; Lexington, KY	9–4	**Harper** (1–0)	Mcneely (0–1)	**Degen** (1)		1,922	1–3	–
February 21	Appalachian State		Kentucky Proud Park	7–3	**Ramsey** (1–1)	Tuthill (0–2)	None		2,019	2–3	–
February 22	Appalachian State		Kentucky Proud Park	21–4	**Hazelwood** (1–0)	Roberts (0–1)	None		2,217	3–3	–
February 23	Appalachian State		Kentucky Proud Park	8–7^{15}	**Daniels** (1–0)	Cole (0–1)	None		2,392	4–3	–
February 25	Tennessee Tech		Kentucky Proud Park	13–3	**Stupp** (1–1)	Fisher (0–1)	**Gambino** (1)		1,901	5–3	–
February 26	Eastern Kentucky		Kentucky Proud Park	Postponed							
February 28	UNC Wilmington		Kentucky Proud Park	0–8	Sharpe (2–0)	**Ramsey** (1–2)	None		1,987	5–4	–
February 29	UNC Wilmington		Kentucky Proud Park	0–3	Roupp (3–0)	**Hazelwood** (1–1)	Smith (3)		2,005	5–5	–

March
Date	Opponent	Rank	Site/stadium	Score	Win	Loss	Save	TV	Attendance	Overall record	SEC record
March 1	UNC Wilmington		Kentucky Proud Park	4–7	Gesell (2–1)	**Lee** (0–1)	Deatherage (2)		2,427	5–6	–
March 3	Cincinnati		Kentucky Proud Park	12–4	**Marsh** (1–1)	Vore (0–1)	None		2,073	6–6	–
March 4	Murray State		Kentucky Proud Park	9–8	**Lee** (1–1)	Jones (1–2)	None		2,093	7–6	–
March 7	Norfolk State		Kentucky Proud Park	11–1	**Hazelwood** (2–1)	Wright (0–3)	None		2,248	8–6	–
March 8	Oakland		Kentucky Proud Park	11–6	**Daniels** (2–0)	Keathley (0–2)	None		2,564	9–6	–
March 8	Oakland		Kentucky Proud Park	13–2	**Ramsey** (2–2)	Nolin (0–1)	None		2,564	10–6	–
March 10	Western Kentucky		Kentucky Proud Park	10–4	**Marsh** (2–1)	Peter (0–2)	None		2,094	11–6	–
March 13	at No. 6 Vanderbilt		Hawkins Field; Nashville, TN	Canceled (COVID-19 pandemic)							
March 14	at No. 6 Vanderbilt		Hawkins Field	Canceled (COVID-19 pandemic)							
March 15	at No. 6 Vanderbilt		Hawkins Field	Canceled (COVID-19 pandemic)							
March 17	at Indiana		Bart Kaufman Field; Bloomington, IN	Canceled (COVID-19 pandemic)							
March 20	Florida		Kentucky Proud Park	Canceled (COVID-19 pandemic)							
March 21	Florida		Kentucky Proud Park	Canceled (COVID-19 pandemic)							
March 22	Florida		Kentucky Proud Park	Canceled (COVID-19 pandemic)							
March 24	Morehead State		Kentucky Proud Park	Canceled (COVID-19 pandemic)							
March 27	at Mississippi State		Dudy Noble Field; Starkville, MS	Canceled (COVID-19 pandemic)							
March 28	at Mississippi State		Dudy Noble Field	Canceled (COVID-19 pandemic)							
March 29	at Mississippi State		Dudy Noble Field	Canceled (COVID-19 pandemic)							

April
Date	Opponent	Rank	Site/stadium	Score	Win	Loss	Save	TV	Attendance	Overall record	SEC record
April 1	Xavier		Kentucky Proud Park	Canceled (COVID-19 pandemic)							
April 3	Alabama		Kentucky Proud Park	Canceled (COVID-19 pandemic)							
April 4	Alabama		Kentucky Proud Park	Canceled (COVID-19 pandemic)							
April 5	Alabama		Kentucky Proud Park	Canceled (COVID-19 pandemic)							
April 7	Louisville		Kentucky Proud Park	Canceled (COVID-19 pandemic)							
April 9	LSU		Kentucky Proud Park	Canceled (COVID-19 pandemic)							
April 10	LSU		Kentucky Proud Park	Canceled (COVID-19 pandemic)							
April 11	LSU		Kentucky Proud Park	Canceled (COVID-19 pandemic)							
April 14	UT Martin		Kentucky Proud Park	Canceled (COVID-19 pandemic)							
April 16	at Auburn		Plainsman Park; Auburn, AL	Canceled (COVID-19 pandemic)							
April 17	at Auburn		Plainsman Park	Canceled (COVID-19 pandemic)							
April 18	at Auburn		Plainsman Park	Canceled (COVID-19 pandemic)							
April 21	at Louisville		Jim Patterson Stadium; Louisville, KY	Canceled (COVID-19 pandemic)							
April 23	Missouri		Kentucky Proud Park	Canceled (COVID-19 pandemic)							
April 24	Missouri		Kentucky Proud Park	Canceled (COVID-19 pandemic)							
April 25	Missouri		Kentucky Proud Park	Canceled (COVID-19 pandemic)							

May
Date	Opponent	Rank	Site/stadium	Score	Win	Loss	Save	TV	Attendance	Overall record	SEC record
May 1	at Tennessee		Lindsey Nelson Stadium; Knoxville, TN	Canceled (COVID-19 pandemic)							
May 2	at Tennessee		Lindsey Nelson Stadium	Canceled (COVID-19 pandemic)							
May 3	at Tennessee		Lindsey Nelson Stadium	Canceled (COVID-19 pandemic)							
May 5	Wright State		Kentucky Proud Park	Canceled (COVID-19 pandemic)							
May 8	South Carolina		Kentucky Proud Park	Canceled (COVID-19 pandemic)							
May 9	South Carolina		Kentucky Proud Park	Canceled (COVID-19 pandemic)							
May 10	South Carolina		Kentucky Proud Park	Canceled (COVID-19 pandemic)							
May 12	Northern Kentucky		Kentucky Proud Park	Canceled (COVID-19 pandemic)							
May 14	at Georgia		Foley Field; Athens, GA	Canceled (COVID-19 pandemic)							
May 15	at Georgia		Foley Field	Canceled (COVID-19 pandemic)							
May 16	at Georgia		Foley Field	Canceled (COVID-19 pandemic)							

Postseason

SEC Tournament
Date	Opponent	Seed	Site/stadium	Score	Win	Loss	Save	TV	Attendance	Overall record	SECT Record
May 19–24			Hoover Metropolitan Stadium; Hoover, AL	Canceled (COVID-19 pandemic)							

Legend: = Win = Loss = Cancelled
Bold = Kentucky team member

Schedule source:

*Rankings are based on the team's current ranking in the D1Baseball poll.

== 2020 MLB draft ==
The Wildcats did not have any players selected in the 2020 MLB draft.
