= 2020 Arkansas Razorbacks baseball team =

American college baseball season

2020 Arkansas Razorbacks baseball
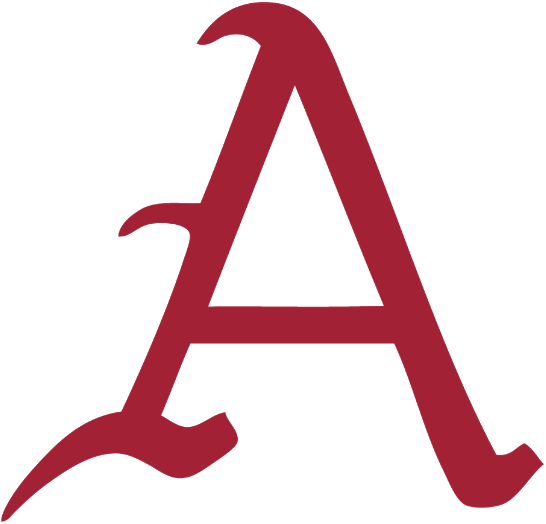
- Conference: Southeastern Conference
- Western Division

Ranking
- Coaches: No. 10
- CB: No. 13
- Record: 11–5 (0–0 SEC)
- Head coach: Dave Van Horn (18th season)
- Assistant coaches: Nate Thompson; Matt Hobbs
- Home stadium: Baum–Walker Stadium, Dickey–Stephens Park (Alternate)

2020 Southeastern Conference baseball standings
	Conf.				Overall
Team	W		L	PCT	W		L	PCT
Eastern
No. 1 Florida ‍‍‍	0	–	0	–	16	–	1	.941
Tennessee ‍‍‍	0	–	0	–	15	–	2	.882
No. 3 Georgia ‍‍‍	0	–	0	–	14	–	4	.778
South Carolina ‍‍‍	0	–	0	–	12	–	4	.750
No. 6 Vanderbilt ‍‍‍	0	–	0	–	13	–	5	.722
Missouri • ‍‍‍	0	–	0	–	11	–	5	.688
Kentucky ‍‍‍	0	–	0	–	11	–	6	.647
Western
No. 8 Ole Miss ‍‍‍	0	–	0	–	16	–	1	.941
Alabama ‍‍‍	0	–	0	–	16	–	1	.941
Texas A&M ‍‍‍	0	–	0	–	15	–	3	.833
No. 17 Mississippi State ‍‍‍	0	–	0	–	12	–	4	.750
No. 18 Auburn ‍‍‍	0	–	0	–	13	–	5	.722
No. 19 LSU ‍‍‍	0	–	0	–	12	–	5	.706
No. 14 Arkansas ‍‍‍	0	–	0	–	11	–	5	.688
‡ – Tournament champion – ineligible for postseason due to NCAA sanctions As of March 12, 2020; Rankings from D1Baseball

The 2020 Arkansas Razorbacks baseball team represented the University of Arkansas in the 2020 NCAA Division I baseball season. The Razorbacks were coached by Dave Van Horn, in his 18th season with the Razorbacks, and played their home games at Baum–Walker Stadium.

On March 17, 2020, the season was officially declared over due to the COVID-19 pandemic. The Razorbacks had a record of 11–5 when the season was cancelled.

== Preseason ==
The Razorbacks played a two-game fall exhibition schedule; the Razorbacks opened on September 20 against Oklahoma at home, falling 3–4 in 14 innings. On October 12, the Hogs traveled to Allie P. Reynolds Stadium in Stillwater, Oklahoma to take on Oklahoma State, to whom they lost 2–7 in 14 innings.

=== Preseason All-American teams ===
1st team

- Heston Kjerstad - Outfielder (Perfect Game)
- Casey Martin - Shortstop (Perfect Game)
- Heston Kjerstad - Outfielder (Collegiate Baseball)
- Heston Kjerstad - Outfielder (Baseball America)
- Casey Martin - Shortstop (Baseball America)

2nd team

- Casey Martin - Shortstop (Collegiate Baseball)

3rd team

- Casey Opitz - Catcher (Baseball America)

== Personnel ==
=== Roster ===
2020 Arkansas Razorbacks roster
Pitchers: 13 Connor Noland - Sophomore; 20 Elijah Trest - Sophomore; 21 Jacob Burton - Sophomore; 26 Travis Hester - (redshirt) Freshman; 27 Blake Adams - Freshman (OF); 28 Kole Ramage - Junior; 29 Marshall Denton - (redshirt) Junior; 31 Caleb Bolden - (redshirt) Sophomore; 32 Zack Morris - Freshman; 33 Patrick Wicklander - Sophomore; 34 Kevin Heinrich - Freshman; 36 Peyton Pallette - Freshman; 37 Caden Monke - Sophomore; 38 Mark Adamiak - Freshman; 39 Evan Taylor - Sophomore; 40 Corey Spain - Freshman; 41 Will McEntire - Freshman; 43 Miller Pleimann - Sophomore; 44 Collin Taylor - (redshirt) Junior; 45 Kevin Kopps - (redshirt) Junior; 46 Carter Sells - Sophomore; 49 Liam Henry - Sophomore; 51 Hunter Milligan - (redshirt) Sophomore; 57 Nathan Rintz - Freshman; 58 Evan Gray - Freshman; 88 Zebulon Vermillion - Junior	Catchers: 7 Dominic Tamez - Freshman (OF); 11 Cason Tollett - Freshman (1B); 12 Casey Opitz - Junior; Infielders: 1 Robert Moore - Freshman; 3 Zack Gregory - (redshirt) Freshman; 4 Cullen Smith - (redshirt) Junior; 5 Jacob Nesbit - (redshirt) Sophomore; 8 Braydon Webb - (redshirt) Junior (OF); 10 Matt Goodheart - Junior (OF); 15 Casey Martin - Junior; 16 Cole Austin - (redshirt) Senior; 17 Jesse Pierce - Freshman (OF)	Outfielders: 18 Heston Kjerstad - Junior; 19 Trey Harris - Sophomore; 22 Curtis Washington Jr. - Sophomore (INF); 24 Bryce Matthews - Freshman; 25 Christian Franklin - Sophomore

=== Coaching staff ===
Arkansas Razorbacks coaches
Dave Van Horn	Head coach	18th
Nate Thompson	Assistant coach/recruiting coordinator	3rd
Matt Hobbs	Pitching coach	2nd
Taylor Smart	Volunteer assistant	2nd
Clay Goodwin	Director of baseball operations	13th

== Schedule and results ==
The full schedule, including all games that were scheduled but not played, is listed below.

Legend
	Arkansas win
	Arkansas loss
	Postponement
**Bold**	Arkansas team member

2020 Arkansas Razorbacks baseball game log
Regular season (11–5)

February (7–2)
Date	Opponent	Rank	Site/Stadium	Score	Win	Loss	Save	TV	Att.	Record	SEC
Feb. 14	Eastern Illinois*	No. 7	Baum–Walker Stadium; Fayetteville, Arkansas	**W** 5–1	**C. Noland** (1–0)	W. Klein (0–1)		SECN+	9,188	1–0	
Feb. 15	Eastern Illinois*	No. 7	Baum–Walker Stadium	**W** 10–1	**P. Wicklander** (1–0)	T. Nicholson (0–1)		SECN+	10,814	2–0	
Feb. 16	Eastern Illinois*	No. 7	Baum–Walker Stadium	**W** 12–3	**K. Ramage** (1–0)	F. Anshutz (0–1)		SECN+	9,116	3–0	
Feb. 20	Gonzaga*	No. 7	Baum–Walker Stadium	**W** 7–5	**C. Monke** (1–0)	J. Rutherford (0–1)	**Z. Vermillion** (1)	SECN+	7,754	4–0	
Feb. 21	Gonzaga*	No. 7	Baum–Walker Stadium	**W** 9–3	**C. Noland** (2–0)	M. Lardner (0–1)		SECN+	8,645	5–0	
Feb. 22	Gonzaga*	No. 7	Baum–Walker Stadium	**W** 5–0	**P. Wicklander** (2–0)	A. Jacob (0–1)		SECN+	10,536	6–0	
Feb. 23	Gonzaga*	No. 7	Baum–Walker Stadium	**W** 9–5	**M. Denton** (1–0)	N. Troglic-Iverson (0–2)		SECN+	7,615	7–0	
Feb. 28	vs. No. 22 Oklahoma*	No. 6	Minute Maid Park; Houston, Texas	**L** 3–6	W. Olds (3–0)	**K. Kopps** (0–1)	J. Ruffcorn (4)			7–1	
Feb. 29	vs. Texas*	No. 6	Minute Maid Park	**L** 7–8	T. Madden (3–1)	**P. Wicklander** (2–1)	A. Duplantier (2)		15,972	7–2	

March (4–3)
Date	Opponent	Rank	Site/Stadium	Score	Win	Loss	Save	TV	Att.	Record	SEC
Mar. 1	vs. Baylor*	No. 6	Minute Maid Park	**L** 2–3	H. Kettler (2–1)	**K. Ramage** (1–1)	L. Boyd (5)		11,528	7–3	
Mar. 3	Illinois State*	No. 13	Baum–Walker Stadium	**L** 7–8	C. Peplow (1–0)	**C. Monke** (1–1)	C. Johnson (1)	SECN+	7,874	7–4	
Mar. 6	South Alabama*	No. 13	Baum–Walker Stadium	**L** 6–13	D. Nightengale (1–0)	**P. Wicklander** (2–2)	J. Dalton (2)	SECN+	8,629	7–5	
Mar. 7	South Alabama*	No. 13	Baum–Walker Stadium	**W** 15–2	**C. Bolden** (1–0)	M. Smith (0–2)		SECN+	12,006	8–5	
Mar. 8	South Alabama*	No. 13	Baum–Walker Stadium	**W** 5–3	**Z. Vermillion** (1–0)	N. Michael (0–1)		SECN+	8,463	9–5	
Mar. 10	Grand Canyon*	No. 14	Baum–Walker Stadium	**W** 6–1	**W. McEntire** (1–0)	C. Lambert (0–1)	**C. Monke** (1)	SECN+	7,871	10–5	
Mar. 11	Grand Canyon*	No. 14	Baum–Walker Stadium	**W** 10–9	**Z. Morris** (1–0)	Z. Barnes (2–1)	**P. Pallette** (1)	SECN+	7,876	11–5	
Mar. 13	at Mississippi State		Dudy Noble Field; Starkville, Mississippi					SECN+			
Mar. 14	at Mississippi State		Dudy Noble Field					SECN			
Mar. 15	at Mississippi State		Dudy Noble Field								
Mar. 17	vs. Oklahoma*		Chickasaw Bricktown Ballpark; Oklahoma City, Oklahoma					SECN+			
Mar. 20	Alabama		Baum–Walker Stadium					SECN+			
Mar. 21	Alabama		Baum–Walker Stadium					SECN+			
Mar. 22	Alabama		Baum–Walker Stadium					SECN+			
Mar. 24	at Troy*		Riddle–Pace Field; Troy, Alabama								
Mar. 25	at Troy*		Riddle–Pace Field								
Mar. 27	at Ole Miss		Swayze Field; Oxford, Mississippi					ESPNU			
Mar. 28	at Ole Miss		Swayze Field					SECN			
Mar. 29	at Ole Miss		Swayze Field					SECN			
Mar. 31	Oral Roberts*		Baum–Walker Stadium					SECN+			

April (0–0)
Date	Opponent	Rank	Site/Stadium	Score	Win	Loss	Save	TV	Att.	Record	SEC
Apr. 2	Florida		Baum–Walker Stadium					ESPNU			
Apr. 3	Florida		Baum–Walker Stadium					SECN+			
Apr. 4	Florida		Baum–Walker Stadium					SECN+			
Apr. 7	Little Rock*		Baum–Walker Stadium					SECN+			
Apr. 9	Texas A&M		Baum–Walker Stadium					SECN			
Apr. 10	Texas A&M		Baum–Walker Stadium					SECN			
Apr. 11	Texas A&M		Baum–Walker Stadium					SECN+			
Apr. 14	Missouri State*		Baum–Walker Stadium					SECN+			
Apr. 17	at LSU		Alex Box Stadium; Baton Rouge, Louisiana					SECN+			
Apr. 18	at LSU		Alex Box Stadium					ESPNU			
Apr. 19	at LSU		Alex Box Stadium					SECN+			
Apr. 21	at Michigan State*		John H. Kobs Field; East Lansing, Michigan								
Apr. 22	at Michigan State*		John F. Kobs Field								
Apr. 24	Auburn		Baum–Walker Stadium					SECN+			
Apr. 25	Auburn		Baum–Walker Stadium					SECN+			
Apr. 26	Auburn		Baum–Walker Stadium					SECN+			
Apr. 28	Arkansas–Pine Bluff*		Baum–Walker Stadium					SECN+			
Apr. 29	Arkansas–Pine Bluff*		Dickey–Stephens Park; North Little Rock, Arkansas								

May (0–0)
Date	Opponent	Rank	Site/Stadium	Score	Win	Loss	Save	TV	Att.	Record	SEC
May 1	at South Carolina		Founders Park; Columbia, South Carolina					SECN+			
May 2	at South Carolina		Founders Park					SECN			
May 3	at South Carolina		Founders Park					SECN			
May 8	Georgia		Baum–Walker Stadium					SECN+			
May 9	Georgia		Baum–Walker Stadium					SECN+			
May 10	Georgia		Baum–Walker Stadium					ESPN2			
May 14	at Tennessee		Lindsey Nelson Stadium; Knoxville, Tennessee					SECN+			
May 15	at Tennessee		Lindsey Nelson Stadium					SECN+			
May 16	at Tennessee		Lindsey Nelson Stadium					SECN+			

*Denotes non–conference game • Schedule source • Rankings based on the teams' current ranking in the D1Baseball poll

== February ==
=== Eastern Illinois weekend series ===
		Gm 1	Gm 2	Gm 3
	Eastern Illinois	1	1	3
7	Arkansas	5	10	12
Baum–Walker Stadium • Fayetteville, AR
	Arkansas wins series, 3–0			

The Razorbacks opened their 2020 season with a weekend series at home against the Eastern Illinois Panthers, starting Friday, February 14. Arkansas received preseason rankings of #7 by D1Baseball, #9 by Collegiate Baseball, and #11 by Baseball America. First pitch on opening day was at 3:00 p.m. CST, followed by 2:00 p.m. on Saturday and 1:00 p.m. on Sunday.

Connor Noland started the season on the mound for the Hogs; after allowing a leadoff single, he retired the next two batters on strikes and the third out came by way of a pickoff. In the bottom of the first, preseason All-American Heston Kjerstad drove in an RBI with a single to left field, giving the Razorbacks an early lead. The next three innings were scoreless for both teams, but the Arkansas offense came back to life in the fifth. Christian Franklin, with two outs, launched a two-run home run deep, scoring himself and Braydon Webb and giving the Hogs a 3–0 lead. Kjerstad added to the lead five pitches later with a home run of his own, extending the lead to four runs. EIU found the scoreboard in the top of the seventh on a fielding error, but Kjerstad made up for it with another solo home run, his second of the contest. From there, the Razorbacks were able to hold the score at 5–1 for an opening day win. For his 6 2/3 innings of work, Noland received the win; he threw 86 pitches. Marshall Denton (1 1/3 innings) and Kevin Kopps (1 inning) also spend time on the mound for the Hogs. Will Klein was the losing pitcher; he was in the game for 5 2/3 innings and was relieved by Blayke Cutts for the last 2 1/3 innings of the contest.

=== Gonzaga weekend series ===
		Gm 1	Gm 2	Gm 3	Gm 4
	Gonzaga	5	3	0	5
7	Arkansas	7	9	5	9
Baum–Walker Stadium • Fayetteville, AR
	Arkansas wins series, 4–0				

The Razorbacks' second weekend series of the year will be at home against the Gonzaga Bulldogs, with the first game on Thursday, February 20. Thursday and Friday's games will begin at 3:00 p.m., Saturday's at 2:00 p.m., and Sunday's at 1:00 p.m.

=== Shriners College Classic, games 1–2 ===
	Gm 1
Oklahoma	
Arkansas	
Minute Maid Park • Houston, TX

The Razorbacks will close out February with an appearance in the Shriners College Classic, held in Houston. They will open tournament play against the Oklahoma Sooners on Friday, February 28; first pitch will be at 3:00 p.m.

	Gm 2
Texas	
Arkansas	
Minute Maid Park • Houston, TX

The Razorbacks' second tournament matchup will be on Saturday, February 29 against the Texas Longhorns, with first pitch at 7:00 p.m.

== March ==
=== Shriners College Classic, game 3 ===
	Gm 3
Baylor	
Arkansas	
Minute Maid Park • Houston, TX

The Razorbacks will close tournament play on Sunday, March 1, when they take on Baylor at 7:00 p.m.

=== Illinois State midweek game ===
	Gm 1
Illinois State	
Arkansas	
Baum–Walker Stadium • Fayetteville, AR

The Razorbacks will return home to play a midweek game on Tuesday, March 3, when they take on Illinois State at 3:00 p.m.

== Rankings ==
Ranking movements Legend: ██ Increase in ranking ██ Decrease in ranking
	Week																			
Poll	Pre	1	2	3	4	5	6	7	8	9	10	11	12	13	14	15	16	17	18	Final
Coaches'	5	5*	5*	10	15	14														
Baseball America	11	11	9	13	14															
Collegiate Baseball^	9	9	3	13	15	14														
NCBWA†	6	6	2	11	16															
D1Baseball	7	7	6	13	14															

^ Collegiate Baseball ranked 40 teams in their preseason poll, but only ranked 30 teams weekly during the season.
† NCBWA ranks 30 teams in their preseason poll, but only ranks 25 teams weekly during the season.
* A new poll was not released for this week, so for comparison purposes, the previous week's ranking is inserted in this week's slot.

== 2020 MLB draft ==
Player	Position	Round	Overall	MLB team
Heston Kjerstad	OF	1	2	Baltimore Orioles
Casey Martin	SS	3	87	Philadelphia Phillies
