= 2020 Alabama Crimson Tide baseball team =

American college baseball season

2020 Alabama Crimson Tide baseball
- Conference: Southeastern Conference
- Western Division

Ranking
- Coaches: No. 21
- CB: No. 20
- Record: 16–1 (0–0 SEC)
- Head coach: Brad Bohannon (3rd season)
- Assistant coaches: Jason Jackson; Jerry Zulli
- Home stadium: Sewell–Thomas Stadium

2020 Southeastern Conference baseball standings
	Conf.				Overall
Team	W		L	PCT	W		L	PCT
Eastern
No. 1 Florida ‍‍‍	0	–	0	–	16	–	1	.941
Tennessee ‍‍‍	0	–	0	–	15	–	2	.882
No. 3 Georgia ‍‍‍	0	–	0	–	14	–	4	.778
South Carolina ‍‍‍	0	–	0	–	12	–	4	.750
No. 6 Vanderbilt ‍‍‍	0	–	0	–	13	–	5	.722
Missouri • ‍‍‍	0	–	0	–	11	–	5	.688
Kentucky ‍‍‍	0	–	0	–	11	–	6	.647
Western
No. 8 Ole Miss ‍‍‍	0	–	0	–	16	–	1	.941
Alabama ‍‍‍	0	–	0	–	16	–	1	.941
Texas A&M ‍‍‍	0	–	0	–	15	–	3	.833
No. 17 Mississippi State ‍‍‍	0	–	0	–	12	–	4	.750
No. 18 Auburn ‍‍‍	0	–	0	–	13	–	5	.722
No. 19 LSU ‍‍‍	0	–	0	–	12	–	5	.706
No. 14 Arkansas ‍‍‍	0	–	0	–	11	–	5	.688
‡ – Tournament champion – ineligible for postseason due to NCAA sanctions As of March 12, 2020; Rankings from D1Baseball

The 2020 Alabama Crimson Tide baseball team represented the University of Alabama in the 2020 NCAA Division I baseball season. The Crimson Tide played their home games at Sewell–Thomas Stadium.

== Previous season ==
The Crimson Tide finished 30–26 overall, and 7–23 in the conference.

=== SEC media poll ===
The SEC media poll was released on February 6, 2020 with the Crimson Tide predicted to finish in last place in the Western Division.

Media poll (West)
Predicted finish	Team	Votes (1st place)
1	Arkansas	82 (5)
2	Mississippi State	73 (4)
T-3	LSU	67 (3)
T-3	Auburn	67 (2)
5	Texas A&M	44
6	Ole Miss	38
7	Alabama	21

== Personnel ==
=== Roster ===
2020 Alabama Crimson Tide roster
Pitchers: 4 - Connor Prielipp- Freshman; 9 - Casey Cobb - Senior; 14 - Antoine Jean - Freshman; 21 - Garret Rukes - (redshirt) Junior; 25 - Dylan Smith - Sophomore; 26 - Dylan Oliver - Senior; 27 - Chase Lee - Sophomore; 29 - Connor Shamblin - Sophomore; 30 - William Freeman - Senior; 31 - Ryan O'Connell - Junior; 32 - Blake Bennett - Freshman; 33 - Kyle Cameron - (redshirt) Senior; 34 - Jacob McNairy - Sophomore; 40 - Brock Guffey - Junior; 48 - Landon Green - (redshirt) Freshman; 50 - Garrett Hester - Freshman; 54 - Dowd Ritter - Freshman	Catchers: 12 - Johnny Hawk - Senior; 19 - Sam Praytor - (redshirt) Sophomore; Infielders: 10 - Jim Jarvis - Freshman; 11 - William Hamiter - Freshman; 18 - Drew Williamson - Sophomore; 23 - Logan Keller - Freshman; 24 - Kolby Robinson - Senior; 44 - Zane Denton - Freshman	Outfielders: 1 - Jackson Tate - Junior; 13 - Walker McCleney - Senior; 16 - Owen Diodati - Freshman; 20 - Andrew Pinckney - Freshman; 22 - T.J. Reeves - Sophomore; 28 - Tyler Gentry - Junior; Utility: 2 - Myles Austin (INF/OF) - Freshman; 5 - Tyler Ras (P/UTL) - Sophomore; 7 - Brett Auerbach (C/UTL) - Senior; 8 - Peyton Wilson (C/UTL) - Freshman; 36 - Justin King (OF/INF) - Senior

=== Coaching staff ===
2020 Alabama Crimson Tide coaching staff
Name	Position	Seasons at Alabama
Brad Bohannon	Head coach	3
Josh Jackson	Assistant Coach	3
Jerry Zulli	Assistant Coach	3
Matt Reida	Volunteer Assistant Coach	2
Jack Hoehl	Director of Operations	3

== Schedule and results ==
2020 Alabama Crimson Tide baseball game log
Regular season

February (11–0)
Date	Opponent	Rank	Site/stadium	Score	Win	Loss	Save	TV	Attendance	Overall record	SEC record
February 14	Northeastern		Sewell–Thomas Stadium; Tuscaloosa, AL	**W** 10–0	**C. Prielipp (1–0)**	K. Murphy (0–1)	None	SECN+	3,409	1–0	–
February 15	Northeastern		Sewell–Thomas Stadium	**W** 8–0	**C. Shamblin (1–0)**	S. Jacobsak (0–1)	None	SECN+	2,828	2–0	–
February 16	Northeastern		Sewell–Thomas Stadium	**W** 6–3	**A. Jean (1–0)**	S. Keane (0–1)	**C. Lee (1)**	SECN+	2,953	3–0	–
February 19	Alabama State		Sewell–Thomas Stadium	**W** 10–3	**D. Smith (1–0)**	R. Velazquez (0–1)	None	SECN+	2,268	4–0	–
February 21	at UNLV		Earl Wilson Stadium; Paradise, NV	**W** 8–0	**C. Prielipp (2–0)**	R. Hare (0–1)	None	None	–	5–0	–
February 21	at UNLV		Earl Wilson Stadium	**W** 5–4	**B. Guffey (1–0)**	B. Spooner (1–2)	**C. Lee (2)**	None	696	6–0	–
February 23	at UNLV		Earl Wilson Stadium	**W** 5–1	**A. Jean (2–0)**	J. Sharman (0–1)	None	None	676	7–0	–
February 25	UT Martin		Sewell–Thomas Stadium	**W** 10–5	**G. Rukes (1–0)**	A. Kasick (0–1)	None	SECN+	2,398	8–0	–
February 26	Middle Tennessee		Sewell–Thomas Stadium	**W** 12–6	**C. Cobb (1–0)**	A. Cheeley (0–1)	None	SECN+	2,282	9–0	–
February 28	Harvard		Sewell–Thomas Stadium	**W** 15–3	**C. Prielipp** 3–0	K. Shaw (0–1)	None	SECN+	2,874	10–0	–
February 29	Harvard		Sewell–Thomas Stadium	**W** 10–5	**C. Lee** 1–0	J. Bernard (0–1)	None	SECN+	3,558	11–0	–

March (5–1)
Date	Opponent	Rank	Site/stadium	Score	Win	Loss	Save	TV	Attendance	Overall record	SEC record
March 1	Harvard		Sewell–Thomas Stadium	**W** 6–3	**B. Guffey (2–0)**	P. Thomas (0–1)	None	SECN+	2,540	12–0	—
March 3	South Alabama		Sewell–Thomas Stadium	**W** 12–2	**C. Cobb (2–0)**	M. Boswell (1–2)	None	SECN+	2,389	13–0	—
March 6	Lipscomb		Sewell–Thomas Stadium	**W** 2–1^{(13)}	**B. Guffey (3–0)**	G. Grubbs (0–1)	None	SECN+	2,824	14–0	—
March 7	Lipscomb		Sewell–Thomas Stadium	**L** 2–3	M. Habegger (2–0)	**C. Shamblin (1–1)**	W. Folsom (1)	SECN+	3,229	14–1	—
March 8	Lipscomb		Sewell–Thomas Stadium	**W** 14–2	**A. Jean (3–0)**	D. Bierman (2–1)	None	SECN+	2,577	15–1	—
March 10	at UAB		Regions Field; Birmingham, AL	**W** 13–7	**G. Rukes (2–0)**	J. Smith (0–1)	None	None	1,524	16–1	—
March 13	Missouri		Sewell–Thomas Stadium					SECN+			
March 14	Missouri		Sewell–Thomas Stadium					SECN+			
March 15	Missouri		Sewell–Thomas Stadium					SECN+			
March 18	at Missouri State		Hammons Field; Springfield, MO					None			
March 20	at Arkansas		Baum–Walker Stadium; Fayetteville, AR					SECN+			
March 21	at Arkansas		Baum–Walker Stadium					SECN+			
March 22	at Arkansas		Baum–Walker Stadium					SECN+			
March 24	Southern Miss		Sewell–Thomas Stadium					SECN+			
March 27	Auburn		Sewell–Thomas Stadium					SECN			
March 28	Auburn		Sewell–Thomas Stadium					SECN			
March 29	Auburn		Sewell–Thomas Stadium					SECN+			
March 31	at Samford		Joe Lee Griffin Stadium; Birmingham, AL					None			

April
Date	Opponent	Rank	Site/stadium	Score	Win	Loss	Save	TV	Attendance	Overall record	SEC record
April 1	North Alabama		Sewell–Thomas Stadium					SECN+			
April 3	at Kentucky		Kentucky Proud Park; Lexington, KY								
April 4	at Kentucky		Kentucky Proud Park								
April 5	at Kentucky		Kentucky Proud Park								
April 7	Jacksonville State		Sewell–Thomas Stadium								
April 10	Tennessee		Sewell–Thomas Stadium								
April 11	Tennessee		Sewell–Thomas Stadium								
April 12	Tennessee		Sewell–Thomas Stadium								
April 14	UAB		Sewell–Thomas Stadium								
April 17	at Texas A&M		Olsen Field at Blue Bell Park; College Station, TX								
April 18	at Texas A&M		Olsen Field at Blue Bell Park								
April 19	at Texas A&M		Olsen Field at Blue Bell Park								
April 21	Samford		Sewell–Thomas Stadium								
April 24	at Vanderbilt		Hawkins Field; Nashville, TN								
April 25	at Vanderbilt		Hawkins Field								
April 26	at Vanderbilt		Hawkins Field								

May
Date	Opponent	Rank	Site/stadium	Score	Win	Loss	Save	TV	Attendance	Overall record	SEC record
May 1	Mississippi State		Sewell–Thomas Stadium								
May 2	Mississippi State		Sewell–Thomas Stadium								
May 3	Mississippi State		Sewell–Thomas Stadium								
May 5	at Jacksonville State		Rudy Abbott Field; Jacksonville, AL								
May 8	at LSU		Alex Box Stadium; Baton Rouge, LA								
May 9	at LSU		Alex Box Stadium								
May 10	at LSU		Alex Box Stadium								
May 12	Troy		Sewell–Thomas Stadium								
May 14	Ole Miss		Sewell–Thomas Stadium								
May 15	Ole Miss		Sewell–Thomas Stadium								
May 16	Ole Miss		Sewell–Thomas Stadium								

Postseason

SEC Tournament
Date	Opponent	Seed	Site/stadium	Score	Win	Loss	Save	TV	Attendance	Overall record	SECT Record
May 19–24			Hoover Metropolitan Stadium; Hoover, AL								

Legend: = Win = Loss = Cancelled
Bold = Alabama team member

Schedule source:

*Rankings are based on the team's current ranking in the D1Baseball poll.

== 2020 MLB draft ==
Player	Position	Round	Overall	MLB team
Tyler Gentry	OF	3	76	Kansas City Royals
