= Taylor Stadium (Missouri) =

Baseball park at University of Missouri

Coordinates: 38.93557°N 92.33860°W

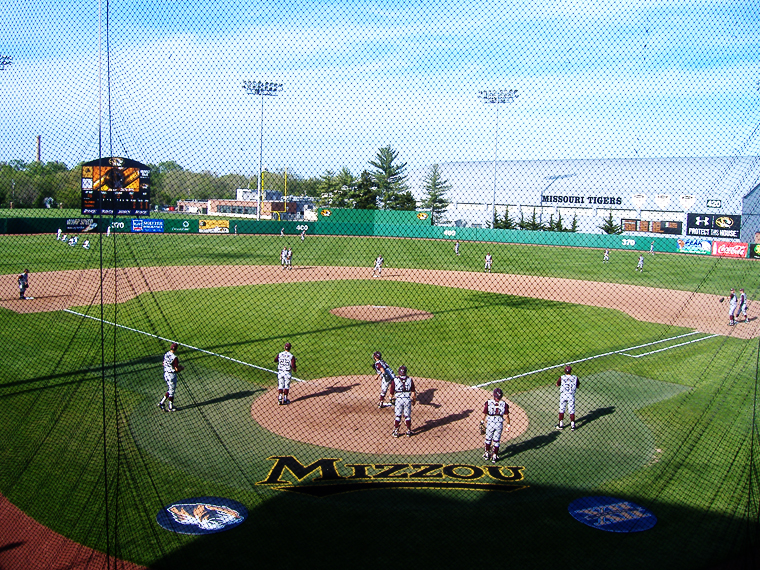
- Interactive map of Taylor Stadium
- Full name: Ralph and Debbie Taylor/Phi Delta Theta Stadium at Simmons Field
- Location: Columbia, Missouri
- Owner: University of Missouri
- Capacity: 3,031
- Surface: Kentucky Bluegrass (OF); Baby Bermuda (IF)
- Field size: Left Field - 340 feet (104 m); Center Field - 400 feet (122 m); Right Field - 340 feet (104 m)

Construction
- Groundbreaking: June 1999
- Opened: 2002
- Renovated: 2010
- Expanded: 2013–2014
- Architects: Peckham & Wright Architects Inc.
- General contractor: Crawford Construction Inc.

Tenants
- Missouri Tigers (NCAA) (2002–present); Mid-Missouri Mavericks (FL) (2003–2005)

Website
- www.mutigers.com/facilities/fac-taylor-field-bb.html

Ralph and Debbie Taylor Stadium at Simmons Field (also Taylor Stadium at Simmons Field) is a baseball stadium at the University of Missouri in Columbia, Missouri. It is the home field of the Missouri Tigers baseball. It was also the home of the defunct Mid-Missouri Mavericks minor league baseball team of the Frontier League. It originally opened in 2002 and holds 3,031 people. The stadium was named for Mizzou alumnus Ralph Taylor and his wife Debbie, who gave a donation to build the stadium.

Prior to the 2010 season, renovations were completed that included an indoor facility that houses batting cages, two dirt pitching mounds, a team meeting room and a conference room, a new videoboard and scoreboard, a larger home bullpen, a renovated visitors bullpen, new railings in front of each of the dugouts, padded outfield walls, a brick wall that outlines foul territory, and new signage on Devine Pavilion that recognized Mizzou's retired numbers and the Tigers' NCAA postseason appearances.

In 2014, renovation included a new home clubhouse/locker room and coaches offices along the left-field foul line and additional seating along the right-field line. The renovations were completed as part of a $102 million project to renovate Missouri's facilities for its move to the Southeastern Conference.

== See also ==
- List of NCAA Division I baseball venues
