= 2020 NC State Wolfpack baseball team =

American college baseball season

2020 NC State Wolfpack baseball
- Conference: Atlantic Coast Conference

Ranking
- Coaches: No. 9
- CB: No. 11
- Record: 14–3 (1–2 ACC)
- Head coach: Elliott Avent (23rd season)
- Assistant coaches: Chris Hart (15th season); Joey Holcomb (1st season)
- Pitching coach: Clint Chrysler (2nd season)
- Home stadium: Doak Field

2020 Atlantic Coast Conference baseball standings
	Conf.				Overall
Team	W		L	PCT	W		L	PCT
Atlantic
Notre Dame ‍‍‍	3	–	0	1.000	11	–	2	.846
No. 24 Clemson ‍‍‍	3	–	0	1.000	14	–	3	.824
No. 2 Louisville ‍‍‍	2	–	1	.667	13	–	4	.765
No. 11 NC State ‍‍‍	1	–	2	.333	14	–	3	.824
No. 15 Florida State ‍‍‍	1	–	2	.333	12	–	5	.706
Wake Forest ‍‍‍	1	–	2	.333	10	–	8	.556
Boston College ‍‍‍	0	–	3	.000	6	–	9	.400
Coastal
No. 7 Miami (FL) ‍‍‍	3	–	0	1.000	12	–	4	.750
Virginia ‍‍‍	2	–	1	.667	14	–	4	.778
No. 10 Duke ‍‍‍	2	–	1	.667	12	–	4	.750
Georgia Tech ‍‍‍	2	–	1	.667	11	–	5	.688
No. 25 Virginia Tech ‍‍‍	1	–	2	.333	11	–	5	.688
North Carolina ‍‍‍	0	–	3	.000	12	–	7	.632
Pittsburgh ‍‍‍	0	–	3	.000	10	–	6	.625
‡ – Tournament champion As of March 18, 2020; Rankings from D1Baseball

The 2020 NC State Wolfpack baseball team represented North Carolina State University during the 2020 NCAA Division I baseball season. The Wolfpack played their home games at Doak Field as a member of the Atlantic Coast Conference. They were led by head coach Elliott Avent, his 24th season at NC State. On March 12, 2020, due to the COVID-19 pandemic, NC State and the ACC announced the season will be suspended until further notice. On March 17, 2020, the Atlantic Coast Conference announced all spring sports would be cancelled for the remainder of the season.

== Previous season ==
In 2019, the Wolfpack finished the season 2nd in the ACC's Atlantic Division with a record of 42–19, 18–12 in conference play. They qualified for the 2019 Atlantic Coast Conference baseball tournament, and were eliminated in the semifinals. They were invited to the 2019 NCAA Division I baseball tournament, where they played in the Greenville Regional, where they lost to East Carolina.

== Personnel ==
=== Roster ===
2020 NC State Wolfpack roster
Pitchers: 10 - David Harrison - Junior; 18 - Andrew Tillery - Sophomore; 19 - Dalton Feeney - (redshirt) Junior; 22 - Baker Nelson - Sophomore; 25 - Austin Pace - Freshman; 29 - Reid Johnston - Junior; 30 - Tim Cao - Freshman; 34 - Evan Justice - Junior; 35 - Cameron Cotter - (redshirt) Sophomore; 37 - Logan Bender - (redshirt) Junior; 43 - James Ferguson - (redshirt) Junior; 44 - Kent Klyman - Senior; 46 - Nick Swiney - Junior; 51 - Canaan Silver - Junior	Catchers: 5 - Patrick Bailey - Junior; 12 - Brad Debo - Senior; Infielders: 6 - Vojtech Mensik - Sophomore; 7 - David Vazquez - Junior; 8 - Jose Torres - Freshman; 15 - J.T. Jarrett - Junior; 20 - DeAngelo Giles - Freshman; 21 - Will Butcher - Freshman	Outfielders: 1 - Terrell Tatum - Junior; 2 - Noah Soles - Freshman; 11 - Lawson McArthur - Senior; 14 - Jonny Butler - Junior; 32 - Marek Chlup - Sophomore; Utility: 3 - Devonte Brown (INF/OF) - Junior; 13 - Tyler McDonough (INF/OF) - Sophomore; 16 - Chris Villaman (P/INF) - Freshman; 17 - Sam Highfill (P/INF) - Freshman; 23 - Matt Willadsen (P/INF) - Freshman; 24 - Luca Tresh (C/OF) - Sophomore; 33 - Austin Murr (INF/OF) - Junior; 36 - CJ Neese (P/INF) - Freshman

=== Coaching staff ===
2020 NC State Wolfpack coaching staff
Name	Position	Seasons at NC State	Alma mater
Elliott Avent	Head coach	24	NC State (1978)
Chris Hart	Associate Head Coach	15	Florida State (2003)
Clint Chrysler	Pitching Coach	2	Daytona State (2009)
Joey Holcomb	Assistant coach	1	Huntingdon (2006)

== Schedule ==
Legend
	NC State win
	NC State loss
	Postponement
**Bold**	NC State team member
*	Non-Conference game
†	Make-Up Game

2020 NC State Wolfpack baseball game log
Regular season
February

Date	Opponent	Rank	Site/stadium	Score	Win	Loss	Save	Attendance	Overall record	ACC Record
February 14	James Madison*	No. 16	Doak Field • Raleigh, NC	**W** 4–0	**Swiney** (1–0)	Stewart (0–1)	**Klyman** (1)	2,702	1–0	–
February 15	James Madison*	No. 16	Doak Field • Raleigh, NC	**W** 9–6	**Highfill** (1–0)	Ayer (0–1)	**Klyman** (2)	2,659	2–0	–
February 16	James Madison*	No. 16	Doak Field • Raleigh, NC	**W** 11–2	**Feeney** (1–0)	DeLauter (0–1)	None	2,566	3–0	–
February 18	Longwood*	No. 15	Doak Field • Raleigh, NC	**W** 6–1	**Harrison** (1–0)	Williams (0–1)	None	2,280	4–0	–
February 22	Tennessee Tech*	No. 15	Doak Field • Raleigh, NC	**W** 8–2	**Swiney** (2–0)	Hursey (0–1)	**Nelson** (1)	2,347	5–0	–
February 22	Tennessee Tech*	No. 15	Doak Field • Raleigh, NC	**W** 10–3	**Highfill** (2–0)	Adams (0–1)	None	2,347	6–0	–
February 23	Tennessee Tech*	No. 15	Doak Field • Raleigh, NC	**W** 15–1	**Villaman** (1–0)	Herberholz (0–1)	None	2,560	7–0	–
February 25	UNC–Wilmington*	No. 13	Doak Field • Raleigh, NC	**W** 11–0	**Willadsen** (1–0)	Lawson (0–1)	None	2,308	8–0	–
February 28	vs. Iowa*	No. 13	U.S. Bank Stadium • Minneapolis, MN	**W** 10–6	**Highfill** (3–0)	Irvine (0–2)	None		9–0	–
February 29	vs. Purdue*	No. 13	U.S. Bank Stadium • Minneapolis, MN	**W** 6–0	**Swiney** (3–0)	Brooks (2–1)	None		10–0	–

March

Date	Opponent	Rank	Site/stadium	Score	Win	Loss	Save	Attendance	Overall record	ACC Record
March 1	at Minnesota*	No. 13	U.S. Bank Stadium • Minneapolis, MN	**W** 11–7	**Harrison** (2–0)	Ireland (0–1)	None	1,436	11–0	–
March 4	Coastal Carolina*	No. 8	Doak Field • Raleigh, NC	**W** 24–7 (7)	**Pace** (1–0)	Blackwell (0–1)	None	2,533	12–0	–
March 6	at Virginia	No. 8	Davenport Field at Disharoon Park • Charlottesville, VA	**L** 3–7	Bales (3–0)	**Johnston** (0–1)	Schoch (5)	2,548	12–1	0–1
March 7	at Virginia	No. 8	Davenport Field at Disharoon Park • Charlottesville, VA	**W** 6–2	**Swiney** (4–0)	Whitten (0–1)	None	2,766	13–1	1–1
March 8	at Virginia	No. 8	Davenport Field at Disharoon Park • Charlottesville, VA	**L** 3–10	Savino (1–0)	**Harrison** (2–1)	None	2,884	13–2	1–2
March 10	UNC–Charlotte*	No. 11	Doak Field • Raleigh, NC	**L** 8–9	Bruce (1–0)	**Highfill** (3–1)	None	2,302	13–3	1–2
March 11	North Carolina A&T*	No. 11	Doak Field • Raleigh, NC	**W** 8–7	**Feeney** (2–0)	Johnson (1–3)	None	2,271	14–3	1–2
March 13	Boston College	No. 11	Doak Field • Raleigh, NC	canceled					–	–
March 14	Boston College	No. 11	Doak Field • Raleigh, NC	canceled					–	–
March 15	Boston College	No. 11	Doak Field • Raleigh, NC	canceled					–	–
March 18	vs. South Carolina*		BB&T Ballpark • Charlotte, NC	canceled					–	–
March 20	Wake Forest		Doak Field • Raleigh, NC	canceled					–	–
March 21	Wake Forest		Doak Field • Raleigh, NC	canceled					–	–
March 22	Wake Forest		Doak Field • Raleigh, NC	canceled					–	–
March 24	vs. UNC–Charlotte*		BB&T Ballpark • Charlotte, NC	canceled					–	–
March 27	at Florida State		Dick Howser Stadium • Tallahassee, FL	canceled					–	–
March 28	at Florida State		Dick Howser Stadium • Tallahassee, FL	canceled					–	–
March 29	at Florida State		Dick Howser Stadium • Tallahassee, FL	canceled					–	–

April

Date	Opponent	Rank	Site/stadium	Score	Win	Loss	Save	Attendance	Overall record	ACC Record
April 1	Wofford*		Doak Field • Raleigh, NC	canceled					–	–
April 3	Duke		Doak Field • Raleigh, NC	canceled					–	–
April 4	Duke		Doak Field • Raleigh, NC	canceled					–	–
April 5	Duke		Doak Field • Raleigh, NC	canceled					–	–
April 7	at Campbell*		Jim Perry Stadium • Buies Creek, NC	canceled					–	–
April 10	at Georgia Tech		Russ Chandler Stadium • Atlanta, GA	canceled					–	–
April 11	at Georgia Tech		Russ Chandler Stadium • Atlanta, GA	canceled					–	–
April 12	at Georgia Tech		Russ Chandler Stadium • Atlanta, GA	canceled					–	–
April 15	at Elon*		Latham Park • Elon, NC	canceled					–	–
April 17	North Carolina		Doak Field • Raleigh, NC	canceled					–	–
April 18	North Carolina		Doak Field • Raleigh, NC	canceled					–	–
April 19	North Carolina		Doak Field • Raleigh, NC	canceled					–	–
April 21	Elon*		Doak Field • Raleigh, NC	canceled					–	–
April 24	at Clemson		Doug Kingsmore Stadium • Clemson, SC	canceled					–	–
April 25	at Clemson		Doug Kingsmore Stadium • Clemson, SC	canceled					–	–
April 26	at Clemson		Doug Kingsmore Stadium • Clemson, SC	canceled					–	–
April 29	Campbell*		Doak Field • Raleigh, NC	canceled					–	–

May

Date	Opponent	Rank	Site/stadium	Score	Win	Loss	Save	Attendance	Overall record	ACC Record
May 1	Austin Peay*		Doak Field • Raleigh, NC	canceled					–	–
May 2	Austin Peay*		Doak Field • Raleigh, NC	canceled					–	–
May 3	Austin Peay*		Doak Field • Raleigh, NC	canceled					–	–
May 5	North Carolina Central*		Doak Field • Raleigh, NC	canceled					–	–
May 8	at Louisville		Jim Patterson Stadium • Louisville, KY	canceled					–	–
May 9	at Louisville		Jim Patterson Stadium • Louisville, KY	canceled					–	–
May 10	at Louisville		Jim Patterson Stadium • Louisville, KY	canceled					–	–
May 12	at UNC–Wilmington		Brooks Field • Wilmington, NC	canceled					–	–
May 14	Notre Dame		Doak Field • Raleigh, NC	canceled					–	–
May 15	Notre Dame		Doak Field • Raleigh, NC	canceled					–	–
May 16	Notre Dame		Doak Field • Raleigh, NC	canceled					–	–

Postseason
ACC Tournament

Date	Opponent	Rank	Site/stadium	Score	Win	Loss	Save	Attendance	Overall record	ACCT Record
May 19–24	vs TBD		BB&T Ballpark • Charlotte, NC	canceled					–	–

All rankings from D1Baseball.

== Ranking movements ==
Ranking movements Legend: ██ Increase in ranking ██ Decrease in ranking
	Week																			
Poll	Pre	1	2	3	4	5	6	7	8	9	10	11	12	13	14	15	16	17	18	Final
Coaches'	18	18*		7	9															
Baseball America	17	18	17	15	18															
Collegiate Baseball^	16	16	10	7	11															
NCBWA†	17	12	8	7	10															
D1Baseball	16	15	13	8	11															

^ Collegiate Baseball ranked 40 teams in their preseason poll, but only ranked 30 teams weekly during the season.
† NCBWA ranks 30 teams in their preseason poll, but only ranks 25 teams weekly during the season.
* A new poll was not released for this week, so for comparison purposes, the previous week's ranking is inserted in this week's slot.

== 2020 MLB draft ==
Player	Position	Round	Overall	MLB team
Patrick Bailey	C	1	13	San Francisco Giants
Nick Swiney	LHP	Comp	67	San Francisco Giants
