= 2020 Florida Gators baseball team =

American college baseball season

2020 Florida Gators baseball
- Conference: Southeastern Conference
- Eastern Division

Ranking
- Coaches: No. 1
- CB: No. 1
- Record: 16–1 (0–0 SEC)
- Head coach: Kevin O'Sullivan (13th season)
- Assistant coaches: Craig Bell (13th year); Chuck Jeroloman (1st year)
- Home stadium: Alfred A. McKethan Stadium

2020 Southeastern Conference baseball standings
| | Conf. | | | | Overall |
| Team | W | | L | PCT | W | | L | PCT |
|---|---|---|---|---|---|---|---|---|
Eastern
| No. 1 Florida ‍‍‍ | 0 | – | 0 | – | 16 | – | 1 | .941 |
| Tennessee ‍‍‍ | 0 | – | 0 | – | 15 | – | 2 | .882 |
| No. 3 Georgia ‍‍‍ | 0 | – | 0 | – | 14 | – | 4 | .778 |
| South Carolina ‍‍‍ | 0 | – | 0 | – | 12 | – | 4 | .750 |
| No. 6 Vanderbilt ‍‍‍ | 0 | – | 0 | – | 13 | – | 5 | .722 |
| Missouri • ‍‍‍ | 0 | – | 0 | – | 11 | – | 5 | .688 |
| Kentucky ‍‍‍ | 0 | – | 0 | – | 11 | – | 6 | .647 |
Western
| No. 8 Ole Miss ‍‍‍ | 0 | – | 0 | – | 16 | – | 1 | .941 |
| Alabama ‍‍‍ | 0 | – | 0 | – | 16 | – | 1 | .941 |
| Texas A&M ‍‍‍ | 0 | – | 0 | – | 15 | – | 3 | .833 |
| No. 17 Mississippi State ‍‍‍ | 0 | – | 0 | – | 12 | – | 4 | .750 |
| No. 18 Auburn ‍‍‍ | 0 | – | 0 | – | 13 | – | 5 | .722 |
| No. 19 LSU ‍‍‍ | 0 | – | 0 | – | 12 | – | 5 | .706 |
| No. 14 Arkansas ‍‍‍ | 0 | – | 0 | – | 11 | – | 5 | .688 |
‡ – Tournament champion – ineligible for postseason due to NCAA sanctions As of March 12, 2020; Rankings from D1Baseball

The 2020 Florida Gators baseball team represented the University of Florida in the sport of baseball during the 2020 college baseball season. Florida competed in the Eastern Division of the Southeastern Conference (SEC). Home games were played at Alfred A. McKethan Stadium on the university's Gainesville, Florida campus, in the final season at the ballpark. The team was coached by Kevin O'Sullivan in his thirteenth season as Florida's head coach. The Gators entered the season looking to return to the College World Series after an early regional exit in last year's Lubbock Regional.

The season was cut short in stages by March 17 due to the COVID-19 pandemic. The Gators finished with a 16–1 record, tied for the best in the country, and ranked No. 1 in all major polls. A tightly contested road sweep of the Miami Hurricanes helped propel Florida to the top spot in the rankings. Not knowing at the time it would be their final game, the Gators saw their 11-game winning streak over Florida State come to an end in the last game played at McKethan Stadium.

== Previous season ==
The Gators finished the 2019 season with a 34–26 record, compiling a 13–17 mark in the SEC.

=== 2019 MLB draft ===
The Gators had five players drafted in the 2019 MLB draft.

| Player | Position | Round | Overall | MLB Team |
|---|---|---|---|---|
| Brady McConnell | Shortstop | 2 | 44 | Kansas City Royals |
| Tyler Dyson | Pitcher | 5 | 153 | Washington Nationals |
| Wil Dalton | Outield | 8 | 257 | Boston Red Sox |
| Nelson Maldonado | Outfield | 21 | 642 | Chicago Cubs |
| **Hunter Barco** | Pitcher | 24 | 718 | New York Mets |
| Feleipe Franks | Pitcher | 31 | 947 | Boston Red Sox |
| **Tyler Nesbitt** | Pitcher | 32 | 969 | Colorado Rockies |

Players in bold are signees drafted from high school that will attend Florida.

== Preseason ==
=== SEC media poll ===
The SEC media poll was released on February 6, 2020, with the Gators predicted to finish in second place in the Eastern Division.

**Media poll (East)**
| Predicted finish | Team | Votes (1st place) |
| 1 | Vanderbilt | 87 (9) |
| 2 | **Florida** | 77 (3) |
| 3 | Georgia | 76 (2) |
| 4 | Tennessee | 50 |
| 5 | South Carolina | 48 |
| 6 | Missouri | 32 |
| 7 | Kentucky | 22 |

== Personnel ==
=== By player ===
2020 Florida Gators baseball team
Players
Coaches

| # | Pos. | Name | B/T | Height | Weight | Year | Home town |
|---|---|---|---|---|---|---|---|
| 22 | INF | Cory Acton | L/R | 6 ft 0 in (1.83 m) | 190 lb (86 kg) | So | Fort Lauderdale, FL |
| 39 | RHP | Justin Alintoff | R/R | 6 ft 2 in (1.88 m) | 220 lb (100 kg) | Jr | Jupiter, FL |
| 34 | INF | Kris Armstrong | S/R | 6 ft 4 in (1.93 m) | 230 lb (104 kg) | So | Jupiter, FL |
| 12 | LHP | Hunter Barco | L/L | 6 ft 4 in (1.93 m) | 210 lb (95 kg) | Fr | Jacksonville, FL |
| 21 | INF | Nick Blasucci | R/R | 6 ft 3 in (1.91 m) | 210 lb (95 kg) | Sr | Fort Myers, FL |
| 29 | OF | Austin Brinling | L/L | 5 ft 9 in (1.75 m) | 170 lb (77 kg) | Fr | Bradenton, FL |
| 15 | INF | Jordan Butler | L/L | 6 ft 1 in (1.85 m) | 195 lb (88 kg) | Jr | Tampa, FL |
| 16 | LHP | Ryan Cabarcas | L/L | 5 ft 11 in (1.8 m) | 160 lb (73 kg) | Fr | Pembroke Pines, FL |
| 6 | INF | Kendrick Calilao | R/R | 6 ft 1 in (1.85 m) | 210 lb (95 kg) | So | Kissimmee, FL |
| 37 | RHP | Nolan Crisp | R/R | 5 ft 9 in (1.75 m) | 185 lb (84 kg) | So | Locust Grove, GA |
| 18 | OF | Brock Edge | L/L | 6 ft 0 in (1.83 m) | 190 lb (86 kg) | Jr | Lake City, FL |
| 4 | OF | Jud Fabian | R/L | 6 ft 2 in (1.88 m) | 195 lb (88 kg) | So | Ocala, FL |
| 46 | RHP | Nick Ficarrotta | R/R | 6 ft 3 in (1.91 m) | 170 lb (77 kg) | Fr | Palm Harbor, FL |
| 2 | C | Cal Greenfield | R/R | 6 ft 1 in (1.85 m) | 205 lb (93 kg) | Jr | Chicago, IL |
| 11 | INF | Nathan Hickey | L/R | 6 ft 0 in (1.83 m) | 205 lb (93 kg) | Fr | Jacksonville, FL |
| 44 | OF | Austin Langworthy | L/L | 5 ft 11 in (1.8 m) | 200 lb (91 kg) | Sr | Williston, FL |
| 23 | RHP | Jack Leftwich | R/R | 6 ft 4 in (1.93 m) | 220 lb (100 kg) | Jr | Orlando, FL |
| 17 | RHP | David Luethje | R/R | 6 ft 5 in (1.96 m) | 205 lb (93 kg) | So | Vero Beach, FL |
| 47 | RHP | Tommy Mace | R/R | 6 ft 6 in (1.98 m) | 215 lb (98 kg) | Jr | Tampa, FL |
| 52 | INF | Kirby McMullen | R/R | 5 ft 11 in (1.8 m) | 200 lb (91 kg) | Sr | Ocala, FL |
| 3 | RHP | Garrett Milchin (injured) | L/R | 6 ft 5 in (1.96 m) | 215 lb (98 kg) | Jr | Windermere, FL |
| 30 | RHP | Hunter Mink | R/R | 6 ft 2 in (1.88 m) | 200 lb (91 kg) | Fr | Palm Harbor, FL |
| 10 | RHP | Tyler Nesbitt | R/R | 6 ft 3 in (1.91 m) | 180 lb (82 kg) | Fr | LaBelle, FL |
| 27 | INF | Isaac Nunez | R/R | 6 ft 0 in (1.83 m) | 190 lb (86 kg) | Fr | Orlando, FL |
| 20 | RHP | Nick Pogue | R/R | 6 ft 5 in (1.96 m) | 235 lb (107 kg) | So | Melbourne, FL |
| 28 | C | Matt Powell | R/R | 6 ft 1 in (1.85 m) | 190 lb (86 kg) | Fr | Fort Myers, FL |
| 24 | INF | Josh Rivera | R/R | 6 ft 2 in (1.88 m) | 205 lb (93 kg) | Fr | Avon Park, FL |
| 13 | INF | Andrew Roberts | R/R | 6 ft 2 in (1.88 m) | 190 lb (86 kg) | Fr | Altamonte Springs, FL |
| 14 | RHP | Christian Scott | R/R | 6 ft 4 in (1.93 m) | 215 lb (98 kg) | So | Parkland, FL |
| 9 | INF | Brady Smith | R/R | 6 ft 1 in (1.85 m) | 200 lb (91 kg) | Jr | Niceville, FL |
| 55 | RHP | Ben Specht | R/R | 6 ft 1 in (1.85 m) | 210 lb (95 kg) | So | Fort Myers, FL |
| 5 | RHP | Brandon Sproat | R/R | 6 ft 3 in (1.91 m) | 205 lb (93 kg) | Fr | Pace, FL |
| 32 | OF | Tucker Talbott | R/R | 6 ft 2 in (1.88 m) | 195 lb (88 kg) | Fr | Atlantic Beach, FL |
| 33 | LHP | Trey Van Der Weide | L/L | 6 ft 3 in (1.91 m) | 230 lb (104 kg) | Sr | Longwood, FL |
| 1 | OF | Jacob Young | R/R | 6 ft 0 in (1.83 m) | 175 lb (79 kg) | So | Ponte Vedra, FL |

Head coach

7 Kevin O'Sullivan

Assistant coach(es)

36 Craig Bell
35 Chuck Jeroloman

Legend

- **(C)** Team captain
- **(S)** Suspended
- **(I)** Ineligible
- Injured
- Current redshirt

Roster
Last update: September 25, 2020

=== By position ===
2020 Florida Gators roster
| **Pitchers**: 3 - Garrett Milchin - (redshirt) Junior; 5 - Brandon Sproat - Freshman; 10 - Tyler Nesbitt - Freshman; 14 - Christian Scott - Sophomore; 16 - Ryan Cabarcas - Freshman; 17 - David Luethje - Sophomore; 20 - Nick Pogue - Sophomore; 23 - Jack Leftwich - Junior; 30 - Hunter Mink - Freshman; 33 - Trey Van Der Weide - Graduate Student; 37 - Nolan Crisp - Sophomore; 39 - Justin Alintoff - Junior; 46 - Nick Ficarrotta - Freshman; 47 - Tommy Mace - Junior; 55 - Ben Specht - Sophomore | **Catchers**: 2 - Cal Greenfield - Junior; 28 - Matt Powell - Freshman; **Infielders**: 13 - Andrew Roberts - Freshman; 21 - Nick Blasucci - (redshirt) Senior; 22 - Cory Acton - Sophomore; 24 - Josh Rivera - Freshman; 27 - Isaac Nunez - Freshman; 34 - Kris Armstrong - Sophomore; 52 - Kirby McMullen - Senior | **Outfielders**: 1 - Jacob Young - Sophomore; 4 - Jud Fabian - Sophomore; 18 - Brock Edge - Junior; 29 - Austin Brinling - Freshman; 32 - Tucker Talbott - Freshman; **Utility**: 6 - Kendrick Calilao (1B/OF) - Sophomore; 9 - Brady Smith (INF/C) - Junior; 11 - Nathan Hickey (C/INF) - Freshman; 12 - Hunter Barco (P/1B) - Freshman; 15 - Jordan Butler (P/1B) - Junior; 44 - Austin Langworthy (OF/P) - Senior |

=== Coaching staff ===
2020 Florida Gators coaching staff
| Name | Position | Seasons at Florida | Alma mater |
|---|---|---|---|
| Kevin O'Sullivan | Head coach | 13 | Virginia (1991) |
| Craig Bell | Assistant coach | 12 | North Florida (1989) |
| Chuck Jeroloman | Assistant coach | 1 | Auburn (2005) |
| Lars Davis | Volunteer Assistant Coach | 6 | Illinois (2007) |
| Matt den Dekker | Student Assistant Coach | 1 | Florida (2010) |
| Nolan Fontana | Student Assistant Coach | 1 | Florida (2013) |

== Schedule ==
Legend
| | Florida win |
| | Florida loss |
| | Postponement |
| **Bold** | Florida team member |

2020 Florida Gators baseball game log
Regular season

February
| Date | Opponent | Rank | Stadium Site | Score | Win | Loss | Save | Attendance | Overall Record | SEC Record |
|---|---|---|---|---|---|---|---|---|---|---|
| February 14 | Marshall | No. 4 | McKethan Stadium; Gainesville, FL | **W** 9–2 | **T. Mace** (1–0) | W. Martin (0–1) | None | 4,441 | 1–0 | – |
| February 15 | Marshall | No. 4 | McKethan Stadium | **W** 10–0 | **J. Leftwich** (1–0) | B. Choban (0–1) | None | 4,453 | 2–0 | – |
| February 16 | Marshall | No. 4 | McKethan Stadium | **W** 15–8 | **C. Scott** (1–0) | B. Callaly (0–1) | None | 3,903 | 3–0 | – |
| February 18 | at Jacksonville | No. 2 | John Sessions Stadium; Jacksonville, FL | **W** 13–3 | **N. Ficarrotta** (1–0) | M. Cassala (0–2) | None | 1,063 | 4–0 | – |
| February 19 | Jacksonville | No. 2 | McKethan Stadium | **W** 4–3^{10} | **N. Pogue** (1–0) | C. Mauloni (0–1) | None | 3,300 | 5–0 | – |
| February 21 | at No. 1 Miami (FL); Rivalry | No. 2 | Alex Rodriguez Park; Coral Gables, FL | **W** 2–1^{11} | **B. Specht** (1–0) | D. Federman (0–1) | **N. Pogue** (1) | 4,046 | 6–0 | – |
| February 22 | at No. 1 Miami (FL); Rivalry | No. 2 | Alex Rodriguez Park | **W** 7–4^{10} | **B. Specht** (2–0) | A. McFarlane (1–1) | None | 4,172 | 7–0 | – |
| February 23 | at No. 1 Miami (FL); Rivalry | No. 2 | Alex Rodriguez Park | **W** 5–3 | **H. Barco** (1–0) | S. Cecconi (1–1) | **R. Cabarcas** (1) | 3,554 | 8–0 | – |
| February 25 | Florida A&M | No. 1 | McKethan Stadium | Postponed (rain) Makeup: Unscheduled before season was terminated | | | | | | |
| February 26 | at Stetson | No. 1 | Conrad Park; DeLand, FL | Postponed (rain) Makeup: March 18 | | | | | | |
| February 28 | Troy | No. 1 | McKethan Stadium | **W** 3–2 | **T. Mace** (2–0) | L. Johnson (0–1) | **B. Specht** (1) | 3,377 | 9–0 | – |
| February 29 | Troy | No. 1 | McKethan Stadium | **W** 10–7 | **D. Luethje** (1–0) | D. Wilder (0–1) | **B. Specht** (2) | 4,140 | 10–0 | – |

March
| Date | Opponent | Rank | Stadium Site | Score | Win | Loss | Save | Attendance | Overall Record | SEC Record |
|---|---|---|---|---|---|---|---|---|---|---|
| March 1 | Troy | No. 1 | McKethan Stadium | **W** 7–1 | **H. Barco** (2–0) | T. Ellis (0–1) | None | 4,001 | 11–0 | – |
| March 3 | vs. Florida Atlantic | No. 1 | FITTEAM Ballpark of the Palm Beaches; West Palm Beach, FL | **W** 7–3 | **D. Luethje** (2–0) | M. DeGusipe (0–1) | None | 1,984 | 12–0 | – |
| March 4 | Florida A&M | No. 1 | McKethan Stadium | **W** 5–0 | **T. Nesbitt** (1–0) | K. Coleman (1–1) | None | 2,684 | 13–0 | – |
| March 6 | South Florida | No. 1 | McKethan Stadium | **W** 9–1 | **T. Mace** (3–0) | C. Sullivan (1–2) | None | 3,594 | 14–0 | – |
| March 7 | South Florida | No. 1 | McKethan Stadium | **W** 15–5 | **J. Leftwich** (2–0) | J. Jasiak (1–2) | None | 4,538 | 15–0 | – |
| March 8 | South Florida | No. 1 | McKethan Stadium | **W** 2–1 | **C. Scott** (2–0) | O. Kerkering (0–1) | **B. Specht** (3) | 3,978 | 16–0 | – |
| March 10 | No. 15 Florida State; Rivalry | No. 1 | McKethan Stadium | **L** 0–2 | A. Velez (1–0) | **N. Pogue** (1–1) | P. Messick (1) | 5,276 | 16–1 | – |
| March 13 | No. 3 Georgia | No. 1 | McKethan Stadium | Canceled (COVID-19 pandemic) | | | | | | |
| March 14 | No. 3 Georgia | No. 1 | McKethan Stadium | Canceled (COVID-19 pandemic) | | | | | | |
| March 15 | No. 3 Georgia | No. 1 | McKethan Stadium | Canceled (COVID-19 pandemic) | | | | | | |
| March 17 | Jacksonville | | McKethan Stadium | Canceled (COVID-19 pandemic) | | | | | | |
| March 18 | at Stetson | | Conrad Park | Canceled (COVID-19 pandemic) | | | | | | |
| March 20 | at Kentucky | | Kentucky Proud Park | Canceled (COVID-19 pandemic) | | | | | | |
| March 21 | at Kentucky | | Kentucky Proud Park | Canceled (COVID-19 pandemic) | | | | | | |
| March 22 | at Kentucky | | Kentucky Proud Park | Canceled (COVID-19 pandemic) | | | | | | |
| March 24 | vs. Florida State; Rivalry | | Baseball Grounds of Jacksonville; Jacksonville, FL | Canceled (COVID-19 pandemic) | | | | | | |
| March 27 | Texas A&M | | McKethan Stadium | Canceled (COVID-19 pandemic) | | | | | | |
| March 28 | Texas A&M | | McKethan Stadium | Canceled (COVID-19 pandemic) | | | | | | |
| March 29 | Texas A&M | | McKethan Stadium | Canceled (COVID-19 pandemic) | | | | | | |
| March 31 | Stetson | | McKethan Stadium | Canceled (COVID-19 pandemic) | | | | | | |

April
| Date | Opponent | Rank | Stadium Site | Score | Win | Loss | Save | Attendance | Overall Record | SEC Record |
|---|---|---|---|---|---|---|---|---|---|---|
| April 2 | at Arkansas | | Baum–Walker Stadium; Fayetteville, AR | Canceled (COVID-19 pandemic) | | | | | | |
| April 3 | at Arkansas | | Baum–Walker Stadium | Canceled (COVID-19 pandemic) | | | | | | |
| April 4 | at Arkansas | | Baum–Walker Stadium | Canceled (COVID-19 pandemic) | | | | | | |
| April 7 | North Florida | | McKethan Stadium | Canceled (COVID-19 pandemic) | | | | | | |
| April 9 | Missouri | | McKethan Stadium | Canceled (COVID-19 pandemic) | | | | | | |
| April 10 | Missouri | | McKethan Stadium | Canceled (COVID-19 pandemic) | | | | | | |
| April 11 | Missouri | | McKethan Stadium | Canceled (COVID-19 pandemic) | | | | | | |
| April 14 | at Florida State; Rivalry | | Dick Howser Stadium; Tallahassee, FL | Canceled (COVID-19 pandemic) | | | | | | |
| April 17 | at Tennessee | | Lindsey Nelson Stadium; Knoxville, TN | Canceled (COVID-19 pandemic) | | | | | | |
| April 18 | at Tennessee | | Lindsey Nelson Stadium | Canceled (COVID-19 pandemic) | | | | | | |
| April 19 | at Tennessee | | Lindsey Nelson Stadium | Canceled (COVID-19 pandemic) | | | | | | |
| April 21 | Florida Atlantic | | McKethan Stadium | Canceled (COVID-19 pandemic) | | | | | | |
| April 24 | Ole Miss | | McKethan Stadium | Canceled (COVID-19 pandemic) | | | | | | |
| April 25 | Ole Miss | | McKethan Stadium | Canceled (COVID-19 pandemic) | | | | | | |
| April 26 | Ole Miss | | McKethan Stadium | Canceled (COVID-19 pandemic) | | | | | | |

May
| Date | Opponent | Rank | Stadium Site | Score | Win | Loss | Save | Attendance | Overall Record | SEC Record |
|---|---|---|---|---|---|---|---|---|---|---|
| May 1 | at Auburn | | Plainsman Park; Auburn, AL | Canceled (COVID-19 pandemic) | | | | | | |
| May 2 | at Auburn | | Plainsman Park | Canceled (COVID-19 pandemic) | | | | | | |
| May 3 | at Auburn | | Plainsman Park | Canceled (COVID-19 pandemic) | | | | | | |
| May 5 | Bethune–Cookman | | McKethan Stadium | Canceled (COVID-19 pandemic) | | | | | | |
| May 8 | Vanderbilt | | McKethan Stadium | Canceled (COVID-19 pandemic) | | | | | | |
| May 9 | Vanderbilt | | McKethan Stadium | Canceled (COVID-19 pandemic) | | | | | | |
| May 10 | Vanderbilt | | McKethan Stadium | Canceled (COVID-19 pandemic) | | | | | | |
| May 14 | at South Carolina | | Founders Park; Columbia, SC | Canceled (COVID-19 pandemic) | | | | | | |
| May 15 | at South Carolina | | Founders Park | Canceled (COVID-19 pandemic) | | | | | | |
| May 16 | at South Carolina | | Founders Park | Canceled (COVID-19 pandemic) | | | | | | |

Schedule source:

*Rankings are based on the team's current ranking in the D1Baseball poll.

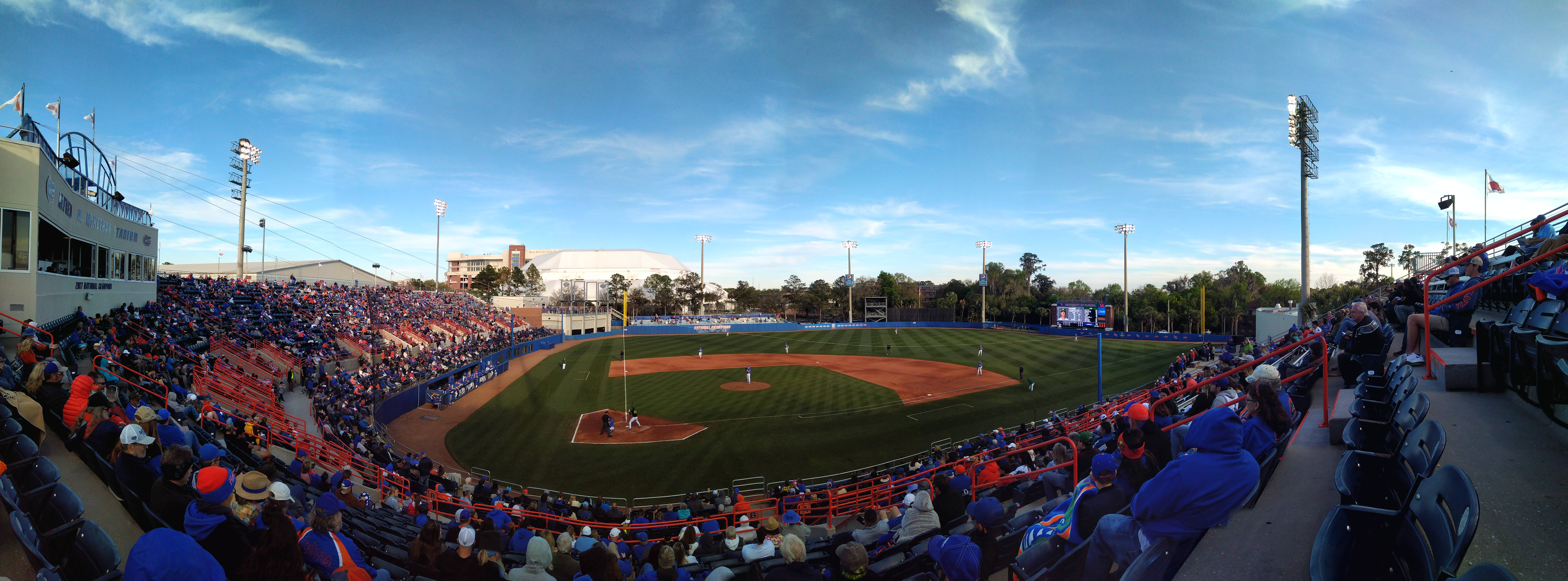
Florida defeated South Florida 15–5 in the last Saturday game played at McKethan Stadium

== Rankings ==
Ranking movements Legend: ██ Increase in ranking ██ Decrease in ranking ( ) = First-place votes
| | Week | | | | | |
| Poll | Pre | 1 | 2 | 3 | 4 | Final |
|---|---|---|---|---|---|---|
| Coaches' | 10 | 10* | 10* | 1 (26) | 1 (28) | 1 (28) |
| Baseball America | 4 | 2 | 1 | 1 | 1 | 1* |
| Collegiate Baseball^ | 14 | 14 | 2 | 2 | 1 | 1 |
| NCBWA† | 8 | 5 | 1 | 1 | 1 | 1 |
| D1Baseball | 4 | 2 | 1 | 1 | 1 | 1* |

^ Collegiate Baseball ranked 40 teams in their preseason poll, but only ranked 30 teams weekly during the season.
† NCBWA ranks 30 teams in their preseason poll, but only ranks 25 teams weekly during the season.
* A new poll was not released for this week, so for comparison purposes, the previous week's ranking is inserted in this week's slot.

== 2020 MLB draft ==
The Gators did not have anyone selected in the 2020 MLB draft.
