= 2020 Miami Hurricanes baseball team =

American college baseball season

2020 Miami Hurricanes baseball
- Conference: Atlantic Coast Conference

Ranking
- Coaches: No. 9
- CB: No. 9
- Record: 12–4 (3–0 ACC)
- Head coach: Gino DiMare (2nd season)
- Assistant coaches: J.D. Arteaga (18th season); Norberto Lopez (5th season); Matt Cleveland (1st season)
- Home stadium: Alex Rodriguez Park at Mark Light Field

2020 Atlantic Coast Conference baseball standings
	Conf.				Overall
Team	W		L	PCT	W		L	PCT
Atlantic
Notre Dame ‍‍‍	3	–	0	1.000	11	–	2	.846
No. 24 Clemson ‍‍‍	3	–	0	1.000	14	–	3	.824
No. 2 Louisville ‍‍‍	2	–	1	.667	13	–	4	.765
No. 11 NC State ‍‍‍	1	–	2	.333	14	–	3	.824
No. 15 Florida State ‍‍‍	1	–	2	.333	12	–	5	.706
Wake Forest ‍‍‍	1	–	2	.333	10	–	8	.556
Boston College ‍‍‍	0	–	3	.000	6	–	9	.400
Coastal
No. 7 Miami (FL) ‍‍‍	3	–	0	1.000	12	–	4	.750
Virginia ‍‍‍	2	–	1	.667	14	–	4	.778
No. 10 Duke ‍‍‍	2	–	1	.667	12	–	4	.750
Georgia Tech ‍‍‍	2	–	1	.667	11	–	5	.688
No. 25 Virginia Tech ‍‍‍	1	–	2	.333	11	–	5	.688
North Carolina ‍‍‍	0	–	3	.000	12	–	7	.632
Pittsburgh ‍‍‍	0	–	3	.000	10	–	6	.625
‡ – Tournament champion As of March 18, 2020; Rankings from D1Baseball

The 2020 Miami Hurricanes baseball team represented the University of Miami during the 2020 NCAA Division I baseball season. The Hurricanes played their home games at Alex Rodriguez Park at Mark Light Field as a member of the Atlantic Coast Conference. They were led by head coach Gino DiMare, in his second year as head coach.

== Previous season ==
The Hurricanes finished the 2019 season with a 41–20 record, compiling an 18–12 mark in the ACC to finish second in the Coastal Division. After a 1–1 finish in the ACC Tournament, the Canes earned an at-large bid to the NCAA tournament. They reached the Final of the Starkville Regional, and as a result earned a ranking of 19 in the final D1Baseball poll.

== Personnel ==
=== Roster ===
2020 Miami Hurricanes roster
Pitchers: 7 - Chris McMahon - Junior; 14 - Carson Palmquist - Freshman; 17 - Spencer Bodanza - Junior; 18 - Alex McFarlane - Freshman; 19 - Alex Munroe - Freshman; 21 - Slade Cecconi - Sophomore; 22 - Albert Maury Jr. - (redshirt) Junior; 32 - Alex Ruiz - (redshirt) Sophomore; 47 - Tyler Keysor - Senior; 52 - Jake Garland - Freshman; 53 - Brian Van Belle - (redshirt) Senior; 61 - Yordani Carmona - Freshman; 99 - Daniel Federman - Junior	Catchers: 31 - Isaac Quinones - Junior; 37 - Daniel Labrador - Freshman; 44 - Adrian Del Castillo - Sophomore; Infielders: 2 - Freddy Zamora - Junior; 9 - Josh Lauck - Junior; 13 - Tyler Paige - Junior; 16 - Raymond Gil - Junior; 27 - Anthony Vilar - Sophomore; 30 - Alex Toral - Junior; 38 - Luis Tuero - (redshirt) Freshman; 40 - Austin Pollak - Sophomore	Outfielders: 28 - Jordan Lala - Sophomore; 35 - Chad Crosbie - Senior; 41 - Chet Moore - Sophomore; 43 - Gabe Rivera - Junior; 51 - Tony Jenkins - Junior; Utility: 0 - Mykanthony Valdez (INF/OF) - Freshman; 10 - JP Gates (P/UTL) - Sophomore; 36 - Jared Thomas (C/OF) - Freshman

=== Coaching staff ===
2020 Miami Hurricanes coaching staff
Name	Position	Seasons at Miami	Alma mater
Gino DiMare	Head coach	20	University of Miami (1992)
J.D. Arteaga	Associate head coach/Pitching Coach	18	University of Miami (2002)
Norberto Lopez	Assistant Coach/recruiting coordinator/Catchers	5	Nova Southeastern University (1999)
Matt Cleveland	Assistant Coach/Infielders	1	Nova Southeastern University (2001)

== Schedule ==
Legend
	Miami win
	Miami loss
	Postponement
**Bold**	Miami team member

2020 Miami Hurricanes baseball game log
Regular season

February
Date	Opponent	Rank	Site/stadium	Score	Win	Loss	Save	Attendance	Overall record	ACC record
Feb 14	Rutgers*	No. 3	Alex Rodriguez Park at Mark Light Field • Coral Gables, FL	**W** 2–1	**Van Belle (1–0)**	Rutkowski (0–1)	**Federman (1)**	2,700	1–0	0-0
Feb 15	Rutgers*	No. 3	Alex Rodriguez Park • Coral Gables, FL	**W** 8–2	**McMahon (1–0)**	Genuario (0–1)	None	2,385	2–0	0-0
Feb 16	Rutgers*	No. 3	Alex Rodriguez Park • Coral Gables, FL	**W** 13–6	**Cecconi (1–0)**	Murray (0–1)	None	2,443	3–0	0-0
Feb 19	Kent State*	No. 1	Alex Rodriguez Park • Coral Gables, FL	**W** 12–0	**McFarlane (1–0)**	Schultz (0–1)	None	2,213	4–0	0-0
Feb 21	No. 2 Florida*	No. 1	Alex Rodriguez Park • Coral Gables, FL	**L** 1–2^{11}	Specht (1–0)	**Federman (0–1)**	Pogue (1)	4,046	4–1	0-0
Feb 22	No. 2 Florida*	No. 1	Alex Rodriguez Park • Coral Gables, FL	**L** 4–7	Specht (2–0)	**McFarlane (1–1)**	None	4,172	4–2	0-0
Feb 23	No. 2 Florida*	No. 1	Alex Rodriguez Park • Coral Gables, FL	**L** 3–5	Barco (1–0)	**Cecconi (1–1)**	Cabarcas (1)	3,554	4–3	0-0
Feb 26	South Florida*	No. 7	Alex Rodriguez Park • Coral Gables, FL	**W** 7-5	**C. Palmquist (1-0)**	Hoffman (0-1)	None	2,016	5-3	0-0
Feb 28	Towson*	No. 7	Alex Rodriguez Park • Coral Gables, FL	**W** 2-1	**Van Belle (2–0)**	J. Selis (0-3)	**Federman (2)**	2,431	6-3	0-0
Feb 29	Towson*	No. 7	Alex Rodriguez Park • Coral Gables, FL	**W** 8-2	**McMahon (2–0)**	Ramanjulu (1-2)	None	2,349	7-3	0-0

March
Date	Opponent	Rank	Site/stadium	Score	Win	Loss	Save	Attendance	Overall record	ACC record
Mar 1	Towson*	No. 7	Alex Rodriguez Park • Coral Gables, FL	**W** 9-3	**Garland (1-0)**	Reeser (1-1)	None	2,376	8-3	0-0
Mar 4	at Florida Atlantic*	No. 7	FAU Baseball Stadium • Boca Raton, FL	**L** 2-11	Cooley (1-0)	**McFarlane (1–2)**	None	1,166	8-4	0-0
Mar 6	Pittsburgh	No. 7	Alex Rodriguez Park • Coral Gables, FL	**W** 5–4	**Gates** (1–0)	McKennitt (0–1)	None	2,184	9-4	1-0
Mar 7	Pittsburgh	No. 7	Alex Rodriguez Park • Coral Gables, FL	**W** 5–0	**McMahon** (3–0)	Myers (2–2)	None	2,605	10-4	2-0
Mar 8	Pittsburgh	No. 7	Alex Rodriguez Park • Coral Gables, FL	**W** 14–2	**Cecconi** (2–1)	Gilbertson (2–1)	None	2,541	11-4	3-0
Mar 11	at No. 12 UCF*	No. 7	John Euliano Park • Orlando, FL	**W** 3–2	**McFarlane** (2–2)	Whitehead (1–1)	**Federman** (3)	2,454	12-4	3-0
Mar 13	at Virginia Tech		English Field • Blacksburg, VA							
Mar 14	at Virginia Tech		English Field • Blacksburg, VA							
Mar 15	at Virginia Tech		English Field • Blacksburg, VA							
Mar 17	Lafayette*		Alex Rodriguez Park • Coral Gables, FL							
Mar 18	FIU*		Alex Rodriguez Park • Coral Gables, FL							
Mar 20	Virginia		Alex Rodriguez Park • Coral Gables, FL							
Mar 21	Virginia		Alex Rodriguez Park • Coral Gables, FL							
Mar 22	Virginia		Alex Rodriguez Park • Coral Gables, FL							
Mar 24	Florida Atlantic*		Alex Rodriguez Park • Coral Gables, FL							
Mar 27	at Duke		Durham Bulls Athletic Park • Durham, NC							
Mar 28	at Duke		Durham Bulls Athletic Park • Durham, NC							
Mar 29	at Duke		Durham Bulls Athletic Park • Durham, NC							

April
Date	Opponent	Rank	Site/stadium	Score	Win	Loss	Save	Attendance	Overall record	ACC record
Apr 1	at FIU*		FIU Baseball Stadium • Miami, FL							
Apr 3	at Notre Dame		Frank Eck Stadium • Notre Dame, IN							
Apr 4	at Notre Dame		Frank Eck Stadium • Notre Dame, IN							
Apr 5	at Notre Dame		Frank Eck Stadium • Notre Dame, IN							
Apr 7	Florida Gulf Coast*		Alex Rodriguez Park • Coral Gables, FL							
Apr 8	Bethune-Cookman*		Alex Rodriguez Park • Coral Gables, FL							
Apr 10	North Carolina		Alex Rodriguez Park • Coral Gables, FL							
Apr 11	North Carolina		Alex Rodriguez Park • Coral Gables, FL							
Apr 12	North Carolina		Alex Rodriguez Park • Coral Gables, FL							
Apr 15	Florida Atlantic*		Alex Rodriguez Park • Coral Gables, FL							
Apr 17	Louisville		Alex Rodriguez Park • Coral Gables, FL							
Apr 18	Louisville		Alex Rodriguez Park • Coral Gables, FL							
Apr 19	Louisville		Alex Rodriguez Park • Coral Gables, FL							
Apr 21	at Florida Gulf Coast*		Swanson Stadium • Fort Myers, FL							
Apr 24	at Florida State		Dick Howser Stadium • Tallahassee, FL							
Apr 25	at Florida State		Dick Howser Stadium • Tallahassee, FL							
Apr 26	at Florida State		Dick Howser Stadium • Tallahassee, FL							

May
Date	Opponent	Rank	Site/stadium	Score	Win	Loss	Save	Attendance	Overall record	ACC record
May 1	Princeton*		Alex Rodriguez Park • Coral Gables, FL							
May 2	Princeton*		Alex Rodriguez Park • Coral Gables, FL							
May 3	Princeton*		Alex Rodriguez Park • Coral Gables, FL							
May 6	UCF*		Alex Rodriguez Park • Coral Gables, FL							
May 8	Clemson		Alex Rodriguez Park • Coral Gables, FL							
May 9	Clemson		Alex Rodriguez Park • Coral Gables, FL							
May 10	Clemson		Alex Rodriguez Park • Coral Gables, FL							
May 12	Florida Gulf Coast*		Alex Rodriguez Park • Coral Gables, FL							
May 14	at Georgia Tech		Russ Chandler Stadium • Atlanta, GA							
May 15	at Georgia Tech		Russ Chandler Stadium • Atlanta, GA							
May 16	at Georgia Tech		Russ Chandler Stadium • Atlanta, GA							

Postseason

ACC Tournament
Date	Opponent	Rank	Site/stadium	Score	Win	Loss	Save	Attendance	Overall record	ACCT Record
May 19	TBD		BB&T Ballpark • Charlotte, NC							
May 20	TBD		BB&T Ballpark • Charlotte, NC							

== Ranking Movements ==
Ranking movements Legend: ██ Increase in ranking ██ Decrease in ranking
	Week																		
Poll	Pre	1	2	3	4	5	6	7	8	9	10	11	12	13	14	15	16	17	Final
Coaches Poll	7	7*	7*	9															
Baseball America	5	3	6	6															
Collegiate Baseball^{^}	4	2	13	9															
NCBWA^{†}	5	2	10	8															
D1Baseball	3	1	7	7															

^{^} Collegiate Baseball ranks 40 teams in their preseason poll, but only ranks 30 teams weekly during the season.
^{†} NCBWA ranks 35 teams in their preseason poll, but only ranks 30 teams weekly during the season.
* New poll was not released for this week so for comparison purposes the previous week's ranking is inserted in this week's slot.

== 2020 MLB draft ==
Player	Position	Round	Overall	MLB team
Slade Cecconi	RHP	A	33	Arizona Diamondbacks
Chris McMahon	RHP	2	46	Colorado Rockies
Freddy Zamora	SS	2	53	Milwaukee Brewers
