= 2020 ACC tournament =

2020 ACC tournament may refer to:

- 2020 ACC men's basketball tournament
- 2020 ACC women's basketball tournament
- 2020 Atlantic Coast Conference baseball tournament
