= 2020 Ole Miss Rebels baseball team =

American college baseball season

2020 Ole Miss Rebels baseball
- Conference: Southeastern Conference
- Western Division

Ranking
- Coaches: No. 5
- CB: No. 6
- Record: 16–1 (0–0 SEC)
- Head coach: Mike Bianco (20th season)
- Assistant coach: Marc MacMillan (5th season)
- Hitting coach: Mike Clement (6th season)
- Pitching coach: Carl Lafferty (14th season)
- Home stadium: Swayze Field

2020 Southeastern Conference baseball standings
	Conf.				Overall
Team	W		L	PCT	W		L	PCT
Eastern
No. 1 Florida ‍‍‍	0	–	0	–	16	–	1	.941
Tennessee ‍‍‍	0	–	0	–	15	–	2	.882
No. 3 Georgia ‍‍‍	0	–	0	–	14	–	4	.778
South Carolina ‍‍‍	0	–	0	–	12	–	4	.750
No. 6 Vanderbilt ‍‍‍	0	–	0	–	13	–	5	.722
Missouri • ‍‍‍	0	–	0	–	11	–	5	.688
Kentucky ‍‍‍	0	–	0	–	11	–	6	.647
Western
No. 8 Ole Miss ‍‍‍	0	–	0	–	16	–	1	.941
Alabama ‍‍‍	0	–	0	–	16	–	1	.941
Texas A&M ‍‍‍	0	–	0	–	15	–	3	.833
No. 17 Mississippi State ‍‍‍	0	–	0	–	12	–	4	.750
No. 18 Auburn ‍‍‍	0	–	0	–	13	–	5	.722
No. 19 LSU ‍‍‍	0	–	0	–	12	–	5	.706
No. 14 Arkansas ‍‍‍	0	–	0	–	11	–	5	.688
‡ – Tournament champion – ineligible for postseason due to NCAA sanctions As of March 12, 2020; Rankings from D1Baseball

The 2020 Ole Miss Rebels baseball team represented the University of Mississippi in the 2020 NCAA Division I baseball season. The Rebels played their home games at Swayze Field.

The final game played by the Rebels was on March 11 against Louisiana–Monroe. The season was suspended following that game due to the COVID-19 pandemic in the United States.

== Previous season ==
The Rebels finished 41–27 overall, and 16–14 in the conference. The Rebels won the Oxford Regional in the 2019 NCAA Division I baseball tournament before losing in the Fayetteville Super Regional to Arkansas.

=== 2019 MLB draft ===
The Rebels had eight players and four signees selected in the 2019 MLB draft.

Player	Position	Round	Overall	MLB Team
Grae Kessinger	Shortstop	2	68	Houston Astros
Will Ethridge	Pitcher	5	159	Colorado Rockies
Thomas Dillard	Catcher	5	163	Milwaukee Brewers
Cooper Johnson	Catcher	6	172	Detroit Tigers
Parker Caracci	Pitcher	21	627	Toronto Blue Jays
**Trey LaFleur**	Outfielder	21	641	Los Angeles Dodgers
Cole Zabowski	First baseman	22	652	Detroit Tigers
Zack Phillips	Pitcher	27	799	Kansas City Royals
Houston Roth	Pitcher	29	858	Baltimore Orioles
**Jerrion Ealy**	Center fielder	31	932	Arizona Diamondbacks
**Hayden Dunhurst**	Catcher	37	1119	Colorado Rockies
**Derek Diamond**	Pitcher	40	1202	Arizona Diamondbacks

Players in bold are signees drafted from high school that will attend Ole Miss.

== Roster ==
2020 Ole Miss Rebels baseball team
Players
Coaches

#	Pos.	Name	B/T	Height	Weight	Year	Previous school	Home town
1	INF	Peyton Chatagnier	R/R	5 ft 10 in (1.78 m)	175 lb (79 kg)	Fr	Cy-Fair	Cypress, TX
2	INF	Connor Walsh	R/R	6 ft 1 in (1.85 m)	187 lb (85 kg)	Fr	Niceville	Niceville, FL
3	INF	Anthony Servideo	L/R	5 ft 10 in (1.78 m)	170 lb (77 kg)	Jr	Jupiter	Jupiter, FL
4	C	Knox Loposer	R/R	5 ft 10 in (1.78 m)	195 lb (88 kg)	So	Jackson Prep	Madison, MS
8	INF	Justin Bench	R/R	6 ft 0 in (1.83 m)	180 lb (82 kg)	So	Calvary Christian	Redington Beach, FL
9	OF	Hayden Leatherwood	L/R	6 ft 1 in (1.85 m)	200 lb (91 kg)	Jr	Christian Brothers; Northwest Mississippi CC	Collierville, TN
10	INF	Tyler Keenan	L/R	6 ft 4 in (1.93 m)	240 lb (109 kg)	Jr	Cleveland	Clayton, NC
11	OF	John Rhys Plumlee	R/R	6 ft 0 in (1.83 m)	192 lb (87 kg)	Fr	Oak Grove	Hattiesburg, MS
12	RHP	Greer Holston	R/R	6 ft 4 in (1.93 m)	220 lb (100 kg)	Sr	IMG Academy	Long Beach, MS
13	C	Hayden Dunhurst	L/R	5 ft 11 in (1.8 m)	209 lb (95 kg)	Fr	Pearl River Central	Carriere, MS
14	INF	Trey LaFleur	L/L	6 ft 3 in (1.91 m)	192 lb (87 kg)	Fr	J. M. Tate	Pensacola, FL
16	RHP	Derek Diamond	R/R	6 ft 2 in (1.88 m)	190 lb (86 kg)	Fr	Ramona	Ramona, CA
17	RHP	Gunnar Hoglund	L/R	6 ft 4 in (1.93 m)	225 lb (102 kg)	So	Dayspring Christian	Hudson, FL
18	RHP	Mitch Murrell	R/R	6 ft 4 in (1.93 m)	195 lb (88 kg)	Fr	Ocean Springs	Ocean Springs, MS
19	INF	Cael Baker	R/R	6 ft 0 in (1.83 m)	245 lb (111 kg)	Jr	Gahanna Lincoln; Wabash Valley College	Gahanna, OH
20	INF	Zack Smith	L/R	6 ft 1 in (1.85 m)	196 lb (89 kg)	Fr	Winder-Barrow	Athens, GA
21	RHP	Drew McDaniel	R/R	6 ft 2 in (1.88 m)	180 lb (82 kg)	Fr	St. Thomas More Catholic	Lafayette, LA
22	RHP	Max Cioffi	R/R	6 ft 4 in (1.93 m)	220 lb (100 kg)	Jr	St. Patrick	Chicago, IL
24	LHP	Jackson Kimbrell	R/L	6 ft 1 in (1.85 m)	195 lb (88 kg)	Fr	Oak Mountain	Birmingham, AL
25	INF	Tim Elko	R/R	6 ft 4 in (1.93 m)	225 lb (102 kg)	Jr	Hillsborough	Lutz, FL
26	LHP	Doug Nikhazy	L/L	5 ft 10 in (1.78 m)	200 lb (91 kg)	So	West Orange	Windermere, FL
27	RHP	Taylor Broadway	R/R	5 ft 11 in (1.8 m)	205 lb (93 kg)	Sr	Cypress Christian; Tyler JC	Cypress, TX
28	RHP	Austin Miller	R/R	6 ft 7 in (2.01 m)	225 lb (102 kg)	Sr	Iowa City West; Kirkwood CC	North Liberty, IA
29	RHP	Braden Forsyth	R/R	6 ft 3 in (1.91 m)	198 lb (90 kg)	So	Magnolia Heights; Meridian CC	Coldwater, MS
31	OF	Ben Gilbert	L/L	5 ft 11 in (1.8 m)	160 lb (73 kg)	Fr	Lake Wales	Babson Park, FL
32		Cam Fisher	L/R	6 ft 2 in (1.88 m)	205 lb (93 kg)	Fr	Hardin Valley Academy	Knoxville, TN
33	INF	Ben Van Cleve	R/R	6 ft 3 in (1.91 m)	245 lb (111 kg)	Jr	Indianola Academy; Northwest Mississippi CC	Indianola, MS
34	RHP	Tyler Myers	R/R	6 ft 1 in (1.85 m)	190 lb (86 kg)	Sr	Dobie; Paris JC	Houston, TX
35	INF	Kevin Graham	L/R	6 ft 0 in (1.83 m)	195 lb (88 kg)	So	Westminster Christian Academy	O'Fallon, MO
38	RHP	Logan Savell	R/R	6 ft 4 in (1.93 m)	180 lb (82 kg)	RS Fr	Madison Central	Madison, MS
39	OF	Cade Sammons	L/L	5 ft 10 in (1.78 m)	165 lb (75 kg)	Fr	University School	Jackson, TN
43	RHP	Cole Baker	R/R	6 ft 2 in (1.88 m)	185 lb (84 kg)	Fr	Hoover	Hoover, AL
48	OF	Jerrion Ealy	R/R	5 ft 9 in (1.75 m)	180 lb (82 kg)	Fr	Jackson Prep	Walnut Grove, MS
55	RHP	Wes Burton	R/R	6 ft 8 in (2.03 m)	235 lb (107 kg)	Fr	Windward	Santa Monica, CA

Head coach

Mike Bianco (LSU)

Assistant coach(es)

Mike Clement (Morningside)
Carl Lafferty (Ole Miss)

Legend

- (C) Team captain
- (S) Suspended
- (I) Ineligible
- Injured
- Current redshirt

Roster
Last update: January 11, 2020

== Schedule and results ==
2020 Ole Miss Rebels baseball game log
Regular season

February
Date	Opponent	Rank	Site/stadium	Score	Win	Loss	Save	TV	Attendance	Overall record	SEC record
February 14	No. 1 Louisville	No. 25	Swayze Field; Oxford, MS	**L** 2–7	R. Detmers (1–0)	**D. Nikhazy (0–1)**	M. Kirian (1)	SECN+	9,853	0–1	
February 15	No. 1 Louisville	No. 25	Swayze Field	**W** 8–6	**A. Miller (1–0)**	J. Poland (0–1)	**B. Forsyth (1)**	SECN+	9,907	1–1	
February 16	No. 1 Louisville	No. 25	Swayze Field	**W** 7–6	**W. Burton (1–0)**	T. Kuehner (0–1)	**M. Cioffi (1)**	SECN+	8,969	2–1	
February 19	Alcorn State	No. 17	Swayze Field	**W** 9–8^{(10)}	**B. Forsyth (1–0)**	J. Fernandez (1–1)		SECN+	7,950	3–1	
February 21	Xavier	No. 17	Swayze Field	**W** 13–0	**D. Nikhazy (1–1)**	L. Flamm (0–2)		SECN+	8,573	4–1	
February 22	Xavier	No. 17	Swayze Field	**W** 9–0	**G. Hoglund (1–0)**	N. Zwack (1–1)		SECN+	9,136	5–1	
February 23	Xavier	No. 17	Swayze Field	**W** 13–3^{(8)}	**D. Diamond (1–0)**	E. Bosacker (0–1)		SECN+	7,966	6–1	
February 25	Southern Miss	No. 15	Swayze Field	**W** 4–3	**A. Miller (2–0)**	M. Adams (0–1)	**B. Forsyth (2)**	SECN+	8,078	7–1	
February 28	vs. High Point	No. 15	Clark–LeClair Stadium; Greenville, NC	**W** 6–2	**D. Nikhazy (2–1)**	H. Smith (2–1)			–	8–1	
February 29	at No. 21 East Carolina	No. 15	Clark–LeClair Stadium	**W** 2–1	**G. Hoglund (2–0)**	T. Smith (1–1)	**B. Forsyth (3)**		4,928	9–1	

March
Date	Opponent	Rank	Site/stadium	Score	Win	Loss	Save	TV	Attendance	Overall record	SEC record
March 1	vs. Indiana	No. 15	Clark–LeClair Stadium	**W** 9–5	T. Broadway (1–0)	M. Brown (0–1)	**B. Forsyth (4)**		–	10–1	
March 3	Memphis	No. 9	Swayze Field	**W** 8–1	J. Kimbrell (1–0)	W. Brockhouse (0–1)		SECN+	8,072	11–1	
March 6	Princeton	No. 9	Swayze Field	**W** 15–0	D. Nikhazy (3–1)	A. Gnazzo (0–2)		SECN+	8,422	12–1	
March 7	Princeton	No. 9	Swayze Field	**W** 18–4	G. Hoglund (3–0)	J. Proctor (0–1)		SECN+	8,573	13–1	
March 8	Princeton	No. 9	Swayze Field	**W** 14–2^{(7)}	D. Diamond (2–0)	C. Nolan (0–2)		SECN+	8,319	14–1	
March 10	at Louisiana–Monroe	No. 8	Warhawk Field; Monroe, LA	**W** 6–3	T. Broadway (2–0)	C. Deeds (0–1)	**B. Forsyth (5)**		2,129	15–1	
March 11	at Louisiana–Monroe	No. 8	Warhawk Field	**W** 18–7	J. Kimbrell (2–0)	N. Judice (1–1)			2,295	16–1	
March 13	No. 19 LSU	No. 8	Swayze Field					SECN+			
March 14	No. 19 LSU	No. 8	Swayze Field					SECN+			
March 15	No. 19 LSU	No. 8	Swayze Field					SECN+			
March 17	UT Martin		Swayze Field					SECN+			
March 19	at Texas A&M		Olsen Field at Blue Bell Park; College Station, TX					SECN			
March 20	at Texas A&M		Olsen Field at Blue Bell Park					SECN+			
March 21	at Texas A&M		Olsen Field at Blue Bell Park					SECN+			
March 24	at Memphis		AutoZone Park; Memphis, TN								
March 27	Arkansas		Swayze Field					ESPNU			
March 28	Arkansas		Swayze Field					SECN			
March 29	Arkansas		Swayze Field					SECN			
March 31	vs. Southern Miss		Trustmark Park; Pearl, MS								

April
Date	Opponent	Rank	Site/stadium	Score	Win	Loss	Save	TV	Attendance	Overall record	SEC record
April 3	South Carolina		Swayze Field					SECN+			
April 4	South Carolina		Swayze Field					ESPNU			
April 5	South Carolina		Swayze Field					SECN+			
April 7	Arkansas–Pine Bluff		Swayze Field					SECN+			
April 9	at Mississippi State		Dudy Noble Field; Starkville, MS					SECN+			
April 10	at Mississippi State		Dudy Noble Field					SECN+			
April 11	at Mississippi State		Dudy Noble Field					SECN			
April 14	Belmont		Swayze Field					SECN+			
April 15	North Alabama		Swayze Field					SECN			
April 17	Vanderbilt		Swayze Field					SECN+			
April 18	Vanderbilt		Swayze Field					SECN+			
April 19	Vanderbilt		Swayze Field					SECN+			
April 21	vs. Mississippi State		Trustmark Park					SECN+			
April 24	at Florida		Alfred A. McKethan Stadium; Gainesville, FL					SECN+			
April 25	at Florida		Alfred A. McKethan Stadium					SECN+			
April 26	at Florida		Alfred A. McKethan Stadium					ESPNU			
April 28	Arkansas State		Swayze Field					SECN+			

May
Date	Opponent	Rank	Site/stadium	Score	Win	Loss	Save	TV	Attendance	Overall record	SEC record
May 1	at Georgia		Foley Field; Athens, GA					SECN+			
May 2	at Georgia		Foley Field					SECN+			
May 3	at Georgia		Foley Field					SECN+			
May 8	Auburn		Swayze Field					SECN+			
May 9	Auburn		Swayze Field					SECN			
May 10	Auburn		Swayze Field					SECN+			
May 12	at Arkansas State		Tomlinson Stadium–Kell Field; Jonesboro, AR								
May 14	at Alabama		Sewell–Thomas Stadium; Tuscaloosa, AL					SECN+			
May 15	at Alabama		Sewell–Thomas Stadium					SECN+			
May 16	at Alabama		Sewell–Thomas Stadium					SECN+			

Post-Season

SEC Tournament
Date	Opponent	Seed	Site/stadium	Score	Win	Loss	Save	TV	Attendance	Overall record	SECT record
May 19–24			Hoover Metropolitan Stadium; Hoover, AL								

Legend: = Win = Loss = Cancelled
Bold = Ole Miss team member

Schedule source:

*Rankings are based on the team's current ranking in the D1Baseball poll.

== Awards and honors ==
=== Regular season awards ===
Weekly Awards
Player	Award	Date awarded	Ref.
Cael Baker	SEC Co-Player of the Week	February 17, 2020	
Cael Baker	Golden Spikes Performance of the Week	February 18, 2020	
Anthony Servideo	Collegiate Baseball National Player of the Week	February 24, 2020	
Doug Nikhazy	SEC Pitcher of the Week	February 24, 2020	
Braden Forsyth	SEC Co-Pitcher of the Week	March 2, 2020	

== February ==
=== Louisville weekend series ===
Louisville Series
No. 1 Louisville Cardinals	at	No. 25 Ole Miss Rebels

February 14, 2020, 4:00 pm (CDT) at Swayze Field in Oxford, Mississippi
Team	1	2	3	4	5	6	7	8	9	R	H	E
No. 1 Louisville	0	0	0	0	0	4	0	0	3	7	12	1
No. 25 Ole Miss	0	0	0	0	1	0	0	1	0	2	6	3
WP: Reid Detmers (1–0) LP: Doug Nikhazy (0–1) Sv: Michael Kirian (1); Home runs: LOU: None; MISS: None; Attendance: 9,853

February 15, 2020, 1:30 pm (CDT) at Swayze Field in Oxford, Mississippi
Team	1	2	3	4	5	6	7	8	9	R	H	E
No. 1 Louisville	0	1	0	1	1	1	1	0	1	6	12	0
No. 25 Ole Miss	3	0	0	0	1	1	3	0	X	8	12	0
WP: Austin Miller (1–0) LP: Jared Poland (0–1) Sv: Braden Forsyth (1); Home runs: LOU: Danny Oriente (1); MISS: Cael Baker (1, 2); Tim Elko (1); Attendance: 9,907

February 16, 2020, 12:00 pm (CDT) at Swayze Field in Oxford, Mississippi
Team	1	2	3	4	5	6	7	8	9	R	H	E
No. 1 Louisville	1	0	0	0	2	1	0	0	2	6	7	1
No. 25 Ole Miss	0	0	0	0	2	1	4	0	X	7	9	3
WP: Wes Burton (1–0) LP: Tate Kuehner (0–1) Sv: Max Cioffi (1); Home runs: LOU: Levi Usher (1); Ben Bianco (1); MISS: Anthony Servideo (1); Attendance: 8,969

=== Alcorn State midweek ===
Alcorn State Braves	at	No. 17 Ole Miss Rebels

February 19, 2020, 4:00 pm (CDT) at Swayze Field in Oxford, Mississippi
Team	1	2	3	4	5	6	7	8	9	10	R	H	E
Alcorn State	4	0	0	1	0	0	2	0	1	0	8	14	4
No. 17 Ole Miss	0	2	2	1	0	2	0	1	0	1	9	8	0
WP: Braden Forsyth (1–0) LP: Jose Fernandez (1–1); Home runs: ALCN: Travaris Cole (3); Tristin Garcia (1); MISS: Tyler Keenan (1); Knox Loposer (1); Anthony Servideo (2); Attendance: 7,950

=== Xavier weekend series ===
Xavier Series
Xavier Musketeers	at	No. 17 Ole Miss Rebels

February 21, 2020, 4:00 pm (CDT) at Swayze Field in Oxford, Mississippi
Team	1	2	3	4	5	6	7	8	9	R	H	E
Xavier	0	0	0	0	0	0	0	0	0	0	0	2
No. 17 Ole Miss	0	5	3	0	2	0	0	3	X	13	9	0
WP: Doug Nikhazy (1–1) LP: Lane Flamm (0–2); Home runs: XAV: None; MISS: Hayden Dunhurst (1); Knox Loposer (2); Attendance: 8,573; Notes: The combined no-hitter from Doug Nikhazy, Drew McDaniel, and Jackson Kimbrell was the first 9-inning no hitter since 1966 and first ever combined no-hitter.

February 22, 2020, 1:30 pm (CDT) at Swayze Field in Oxford, Mississippi
Team	1	2	3	4	5	6	7	8	9	R	H	E
Xavier	0	0	0	0	0	0	0	0	0	0	2	0
No. 17 Ole Miss	0	0	2	0	2	0	0	5	X	9	7	1
WP: Gunnar Hoglund (1–0) LP: Nick Zwack (1–1); Home runs: XAV: None; MISS: Anthony Servideo (3); Cael Baker (3); Hayden Dunhurst (2); Attendance: 9,136

February 23, 2020, 12:00 pm (CDT) at Swayze Field in Oxford, Mississippi
Team	1	2	3	4	5	6	7	8	R	H	E
Xavier	0	0	1	0	0	0	2	0	3	6	1
No. 17 Ole Miss	0	0	1	0	8	2	0	2	13	12	1
WP: Derek Diamond (1–0) LP: Ethan Bosacker (0–1); Home runs: XAV: Kody Darcy (1); MISS: Anthony Servideo (4); Cael Baker (4); Peyton Chatagnier (1); Hayden Leatherwood (1); Attendance: 7,966

=== Southern Miss midweek ===
Southern Miss Golden Eagles	at	No. 15 Ole Miss Rebels

February 25, 2020, 4:00 pm (CDT) at Swayze Field in Oxford, Mississippi
Team	1	2	3	4	5	6	7	8	9	R	H	E
Southern Miss	0	0	0	0	1	1	1	0	0	3	7	0
No. 15 Ole Miss	0	0	2	0	0	0	2	0	X	4	5	1
WP: Austin Miller (2–0) LP: Matthew Adams (0–1) Sv: Braden Forsyth (2); Home runs: USM: Will McGillis (2); MISS: Hayden Leatherwood (2); Attendance: 8,078

=== Keith LeClair Classic ===
Keith LeClair Classic Game One
High Point Panthers	vs.	No. 15 Ole Miss Rebels

February 28, 2020, 11:00 am (CDT) at Clark–LeClair Stadium in Greenville, North Carolina
Team	1	2	3	4	5	6	7	8	9	R	H	E
No. 15 Ole Miss	2	0	0	0	1	2	0	0	1	6	6	1
High Point	0	0	0	0	2	0	0	0	0	2	8	0
WP: Doug Nikhazy (2–1) LP: Harrison Smith (2–1); Home runs: MISS: Tyler Keenan (2); HPU: None

Keith LeClair Classic Game Two
No. 15 Ole Miss Rebels	at	No. 21 East Carolina Pirates

February 29, 2020, 3:30 pm (CDT) at Clark–LeClair Stadium in Greenville, North Carolina
Team	1	2	3	4	5	6	7	8	9	R	H	E
No. 15 Ole Miss	0	2	0	0	0	0	0	0	0	2	6	3
No. 21 East Carolina	1	0	0	0	0	0	0	0	0	1	6	0
WP: Gunnar Hoglund (2–0) LP: Tyler Smith (1–1) Sv: Braden Forsyth (3); Home runs: MISS: None; ECU: None; Attendance: 4,928

== March ==
=== Keith LeClair Classic ===
Keith LeClair Classic Game Three
Indiana Hoosiers	vs.	No. 15 Ole Miss Rebels

March 1, 2020, 10:00 am (CDT) at Clark–LeClair Stadium in Greenville, North Carolina
Team	1	2	3	4	5	6	7	8	9	R	H	E
Indiana	0	0	0	2	0	3	0	0	0	5	9	1
No. 15 Ole Miss	2	0	1	2	0	0	4	0	X	9	10	0
WP: Taylor Broadway (1–0) LP: McCade Brown (0–1) Sv: Braden Forsyth (4); Home runs: IND: Grant Richardson (4); Jordan Fucci (1); MISS: Tyler Keenan (3); Kevin Graham (1); Hayden Dunhurst (3)

=== Memphis midweek ===
Memphis Tigers	at	No. 9 Ole Miss Rebels

March 3, 2020, 6:30 pm (CDT) at Swayze Field in Oxford, Mississippi
Team	1	2	3	4	5	6	7	8	9	R	H	E
Memphis	0	0	1	0	0	0	0	0	0	1	6	1
No. 9 Ole Miss	2	0	0	2	1	1	1	1	X	8	7	2
WP: Jackson Kimbrell (1–0) LP: Walker Brockhouse (0–1); Home runs: MEM: None; MISS: None; Attendance: 8,072

=== Princeton weekend series ===
Princeton Series
Princeton Tigers	at	No. 9 Ole Miss Rebels

March 6, 2020, 6:30 pm (CDT) at Swayze Field in Oxford, Mississippi
Team	1	2	3	4	5	6	7	8	9	R	H	E
Princeton	0	0	0	0	0	0	0	0	0	0	1	1
No. 9 Ole Miss	1	0	1	1	0	8	2	2	X	15	17	1
WP: Doug Nikhazy (3–1) LP: Andrew Gnazzo (0–2); Home runs: PRIN: None; MISS: Peyton Chatagnier (2); Tyler Keenan (4); Kevin Graham (2); Hayden Leatherwood (3); Tim Elko (2); Attendance: 8,422

March 7, 2020, 1:30 pm (CDT) at Swayze Field in Oxford, Mississippi
Team	1	2	3	4	5	6	7	8	9	R	H	E
Princeton	0	0	1	0	0	0	3	0	0	4	7	1
No. 9 Ole Miss	0	0	0	6	0	0	3	9	X	18	11	1
WP: Gunnar Hoglund (3–0) LP: James Proctor (0–1); Home runs: PRIN: Nadir Lewis (1); MISS: Tim Elko (3); Attendance: 8,573

March 8, 2020, 12:00 pm (CDT) at Swayze Field in Oxford, Mississippi
Team	1	2	3	4	5	6	7	R	H	E
Princeton	0	2	0	0	0	0	0	2	6	1
No. 9 Ole Miss	2	2	3	1	4	2	X	14	15	0
WP: Derek Diamond (2–0) LP: Conor Nolan (0–2); Home runs: PRIN: None; MISS: Anthony Servideo (5); Peyton Chatagnier (3, 4); Justin Bench (1); Attendance: 8,319

=== March 10–11 midweek ===
No. 8 Ole Miss Rebels	at	Louisiana–Monroe Warhawks

March 10, 2020, 6:00 pm (CDT) at Warhawk Field in Monroe, Louisiana
Team	1	2	3	4	5	6	7	8	9	R	H	E
No. 8 Ole Miss	3	0	0	0	0	2	0	0	1	6	8	0
Louisiana–Monroe	2	1	0	0	0	0	0	0	0	3	6	1
WP: Taylor Broadway (2–0) LP: Conner Deeds (0–1) Sv: Braden Forsyth (5); Home runs: MISS: Tyler Keenan (5); ULM: Danny DeSimone (6); Attendance: 2,129

March 11, 2020, 4:00 pm (CDT) at Warhawk Field in Monroe, Louisiana
Team	1	2	3	4	5	6	7	8	9	R	H	E
No. 8 Ole Miss	2	4	2	2	2	3	3	0	0	18	18	1
Louisiana–Monroe	0	0	0	1	0	0	3	0	3	7	14	1
WP: Jackson Kimbrell (2–0) LP: Nicholas Judice (1–1); Home runs: MISS: Tyler Keenan (6, 7); Kevin Graham (3); Hayden Dunhurst (4, 5); ULM: Wiley Cleland (1); Attendance: 2,295
