= 2020 Florida State Seminoles baseball team =

American college baseball season

2020 Florida State Seminoles baseball
- Conference: Atlantic Coast Conference
- Atlantic Division

Ranking
- Coaches: No. 16
- CB: No. 13
- Record: 12–5 (1–2 ACC)
- Head coach: Mike Martin, Jr. (1st season)
- Assistant coaches: Jimmy Belanger (1st season); Mike Metcalf (1st season); Tyler Holt (2nd season)
- Home stadium: Mike Martin Field at Dick Howser Stadium (Capacity: 6,700)

2020 Atlantic Coast Conference baseball standings
	Conf.				Overall
Team	W		L	PCT	W		L	PCT
Atlantic
Notre Dame ‍‍‍	3	–	0	1.000	11	–	2	.846
No. 24 Clemson ‍‍‍	3	–	0	1.000	14	–	3	.824
No. 2 Louisville ‍‍‍	2	–	1	.667	13	–	4	.765
No. 11 NC State ‍‍‍	1	–	2	.333	14	–	3	.824
No. 15 Florida State ‍‍‍	1	–	2	.333	12	–	5	.706
Wake Forest ‍‍‍	1	–	2	.333	10	–	8	.556
Boston College ‍‍‍	0	–	3	.000	6	–	9	.400
Coastal
No. 7 Miami (FL) ‍‍‍	3	–	0	1.000	12	–	4	.750
Virginia ‍‍‍	2	–	1	.667	14	–	4	.778
No. 10 Duke ‍‍‍	2	–	1	.667	12	–	4	.750
Georgia Tech ‍‍‍	2	–	1	.667	11	–	5	.688
No. 25 Virginia Tech ‍‍‍	1	–	2	.333	11	–	5	.688
North Carolina ‍‍‍	0	–	3	.000	12	–	7	.632
Pittsburgh ‍‍‍	0	–	3	.000	10	–	6	.625
‡ – Tournament champion As of March 18, 2020; Rankings from D1Baseball

The 2020 Florida State Seminoles baseball team represented Florida State University during the 2020 NCAA Division I baseball season. The Seminoles played their home games at Mike Martin Field at Dick Howser Stadium as a member of the Atlantic Coast Conference. They were led by head coach Mike Martin Jr., in his first season as head coach after succeeding his father and 40-year head coach, Mike Martin, prior to the season.

On March 12, 2020, the season was suspended indefinitely due to the ongoing coronavirus outbreak. On March 17, 2020, the conference announced that the remainder of the season was canceled.

== Previous season ==
The Seminoles finished 2019 with a trip to the College World Series, making their 22nd appearance in Omaha. They finished with a 1–2 record in the event, good for fifth place. For the season, Florida State compiled a record of 42–23, and finished in third place in the ACC Atlantic Division with a 17–13 mark.

== Personnel ==
=== Roster ===
2020 Florida State Seminoles roster
Pitchers: 5 – Shane Drohan – Junior; 6 – Brandon Walker – Freshman; 12 – Tyler Ahearn – Junior; 13 – Jonah Scolaro – Junior; 15 – CJ Van Eyk – Junior; 17 – Clayton Kwiatkowski – Senior; 18 – Hunter Perdue – Junior; 20 – Kyle McMullen – (redshirt) Junior; 21 – Chris Ruckdeschel – (redshirt) Freshman; 29 – Parker Messick – Freshman; 30 – Antonio Velez – Senior; 31 – Conor Grady – Junior; 33 – Chase Haney – (redshirt) Senior; 36 – Davis Hare – Junior; 40 – Jack Anderson – Sophomore; 43 – Bryce Hubbart – Freshman; 48 – Aaron Jensen – (redshirt) Freshman	Catchers: 63 – Matheu Nelson – Sophomore; Infielders: 2 – Nander de Sedas – Sophomore; 3 – Danny Andzel – Freshman; 9 – Cooper Swanson – Junior; 16 – Tyler Martin – Freshman; 27 – Jackson Greene – Junior	Outfielders: 19 – Elijah Cabell – Sophomore; 23 – Reese Albert – Junior; 26 – Robby Martin – Sophomore; 38 – Isaiah Perry – Junior; Utility: 25 – Doug Kirkland (C/P) – Freshman; 32 – Logan Lacey (UTL) – Junior; 45 – Dylan Simmons (1B/P) – Freshman; 51 – Nico Baldor (UTL) – Senior

=== Coaching staff ===
2020 Florida State Seminoles coaching staff
Name	Position	Seasons at Florida State
Mike Martin, Jr.	Head coach	23
Jimmy Belanger	Assistant Coach/Pitching Coach	1
Mike Metcalf	Assistant Coach/Recruiting Coordinator	1
Tyler Holt	Assistant Coach/Volunteer	2

== Schedule ==
Legend
	Florida State win
	Florida State loss
	Postponement
**Bold**	Florida State team member

2020 Florida State Seminoles baseball game log
Regular season

February
Date	Opponent	Rank	Site/stadium	Score	Win	Loss	Save	Attendance	Overall record	ACC record
Feb 14	Niagara*	#15	Dick Howser Stadium • Tallahassee, FL	**L** 1–3	MacKinnon (1–0)	**Hubbart (0–1)**	None	4,670	0–1	
Feb 15	Niagara*	#15	Dick Howser Stadium • Tallahassee, FL	**W** 24–4	**Messick (1–0)**	DeLuca (0–1)	None	4,958	1–1	
Feb 16	Niagara*	#15	Dick Howser Stadium • Tallahassee, FL	**W** 11–1	**Grady (1–0)**	Hospital (0–1)	None	3,736	2–1	
Feb 18	South Florida*	#15	Dick Howser Stadium • Tallahassee, FL	**W** 7–3	**Haney (1–0)**	Marini (0–1)	None	4,005	3–1	
Feb 21	Cincinnati*	#15	Dick Howser Stadium • Tallahassee, FL	**W** 11–4	**Ahearn (1–0)**	Murphy (0–1)	None	4,090	4–1	
Feb 22	Cincinnati*	#15	Dick Howser Stadium • Tallahassee, FL	**W** 10–5	**Haney (2–0)**	Moore (0–2)	None	4,621	5–1	
Feb 23	Cincinnati*	#15	Dick Howser Stadium • Tallahassee, FL	**W** 10–1	**Grady (2–0)**	Batcho (0–1)	None	4,093	6–1	
Feb 25	at Jacksonville*	#11	John Sessions Stadium • Jacksonville, FL							
Feb 28	Florida Atlantic*	#11	Dick Howser Stadium • Tallahassee, FL	**W** 5–1	**Van Eyk (1–0)**	Josey (0–1)	None	4,249	7–1	
Feb 29	Florida Atlantic*	#11	Dick Howser Stadium • Tallahassee, FL	**W** 16–6	**Anderson (1–0)**	Visconti (1–1)	**Ahearn (1)**	5,443	8–1	
Feb 29	#4 Texas Tech*	#11	Dick Howser Stadium • Tallahassee, FL	**L** 5–6^{11}	McMillon (1–0)	**Messick (1–1)**	None	5,443	8–2	

March
Date	Opponent	Rank	Site/stadium	Score	Win	Loss	Save	Attendance	Overall record	ACC record
Mar 1	#4 Texas Tech*	#11	Dick Howser Stadium • Tallahassee, FL	**L** 3–4	Sublette (1–0)	**Hare (0–1)**	Devine (1)	4,279	8–3	
Mar 3	at Mercer*	#14	Claude Smith Field • Macon, GA	**W** 9–8^{11}	**Hare (1–1)**	Molettiere (0–1)	None		9–3	
Mar 6	at #26 Duke	#14	Durham Bulls Athletic Park • Durham, NC	**L** 1–2	Jarvis (3–1)	**Van Eyk (1–1)**	Girard (3)	452	9–4	0–1
Mar 7	at #26 Duke	#14	Durham Bulls Athletic Park • Durham, NC	**L** 3–4	Stinson (3–0)	**Drohan (0–1)**	Girard (4)	703	9–5	0–2
Mar 8	at #26 Duke	#14	Durham Bulls Athletic Park • Durham, NC	**W** 10–2	**Anderson (2–0)**	Carey (1–1)	None	781	10–5	1–2
Mar 10	at #1 Florida*	#16	Alfred A. McKethan Stadium • Gainesville, FL	**W** 2–0	**Velez (1–0)**	Pogue (1–1)	**Messick (1)**	5,276	11–5	
Mar 11	Illinois State*	#16	Dick Howser Stadium • Tallahassee, FL	**W** 7–4	**Haney (3–0)**	Wyman (0–1)	None	3,894	12–5	
Mar 13	Georgia Tech	#16	Dick Howser Stadium • Tallahassee, FL							
Mar 14	Georgia Tech	#16	Dick Howser Stadium • Tallahassee, FL							
Mar 15	Georgia Tech	#16	Dick Howser Stadium • Tallahassee, FL							
Mar 17	at #12 UCF*	#13	John Euliano Park • Orlando, FL							
Mar 18	at #12 UCF*	#13	John Euliano Park • Orlando, FL							
Mar 20	at Pittsburgh	#13	Petersen Sports Complex • Pittsburgh, PA							
Mar 21	at Pittsburgh	#13	Petersen Sports Complex • Pittsburgh, PA							
Mar 22	at Pittsburgh	#13	Petersen Sports Complex • Pittsburgh, PA							
Mar 24	vs Florida*		Baseball Grounds of Jacksonville • Jacksonville, FL							
Mar 27	NC State		Dick Howser Stadium • Tallahassee, FL							
Mar 28	NC State		Dick Howser Stadium • Tallahassee, FL							
Mar 29	NC State		Dick Howser Stadium • Tallahassee, FL							
Mar 31	Jacksonville*		Dick Howser Stadium • Tallahassee, FL							

April
Date	Opponent	Rank	Site/stadium	Score	Win	Loss	Save	Attendance	Overall record	ACC record
Apr 1	Bethune-Cookman*		Dick Howser Stadium • Tallahassee, FL							
Apr 3	at Boston College		Eddie Pellagrini Diamond • Brighton, MA							
Apr 4	at Boston College		Eddie Pellagrini Diamond • Brighton, MA							
Apr 5	at Boston College		Eddie Pellagrini Diamond • Brighton, MA							
Apr 9	Notre Dame		Dick Howser Stadium • Tallahassee, FL							
Apr 10	Notre Dame		Dick Howser Stadium • Tallahassee, FL							
Apr 11	Notre Dame		Dick Howser Stadium • Tallahassee, FL							
Apr 14	Florida*		Dick Howser Stadium • Tallahassee, FL							
Apr 17	at Wake Forest		Gene Hooks Field at Wake Forest Baseball Park • Winston-Salem, NC							
Apr 18	at Wake Forest		Gene Hooks Field at Wake Forest Baseball Park • Winston-Salem, NC							
Apr 19	at Wake Forest		Gene Hooks Field at Wake Forest Baseball Park • Winston-Salem, NC							
Apr 21	Stetson*		Dick Howser Stadium • Tallahassee, FL							
Apr 22	Stetson*		Dick Howser Stadium • Tallahassee, FL							
Apr 24	Miami (FL)		Dick Howser Stadium • Tallahassee, FL							
Apr 25	Miami (FL)		Dick Howser Stadium • Tallahassee, FL							
Apr 26	Miami (FL)		Dick Howser Stadium • Tallahassee, FL							

May
Date	Opponent	Rank	Site/stadium	Score	Win	Loss	Save	Attendance	Overall record	ACC record
May 1	Louisville		Dick Howser Stadium • Tallahassee, FL							
May 2	Louisville		Dick Howser Stadium • Tallahassee, FL							
May 3	Louisville		Dick Howser Stadium • Tallahassee, FL							
May 5	Jacksonville*		Dick Howser Stadium • Tallahassee, FL							
May 6	at Stetson*		Melching Field at Conrad Park • DeLand, FL							
May 12	at Jacksonville*		John Sessions Stadium • Jacksonville, FL							
May 14	at Clemson		Doug Kingsmore Stadium • Clemson, SC							
May 15	at Clemson		Doug Kingsmore Stadium • Clemson, SC							
May 16	at Clemson		Doug Kingsmore Stadium • Clemson, SC							

Postseason

ACC Tournament
Date	Opponent	Rank	Site/stadium	Score	Win	Loss	Save	Attendance	Overall record	ACCT Record
May 19	TBD		BB&T Ballpark • Charlotte, NC							
May 20	TBD		BB&T Ballpark • Charlotte, NC							

== Ranking Movements ==
Ranking movements Legend: ██ Increase in ranking ██ Decrease in ranking
	Week					
Poll	Pre	1	2	3	4	Final
Coaches Poll	14	14*	14*	14	16	16
Baseball America	12	14	12	14	19	19*
Collegiate Baseball^{^}	15	15	11	14	16	13
NCBWA^{†}	14	15	12	14	17	17*
D1Baseball	12	12	9	11	15	15*

^{^} Collegiate Baseball ranks 40 teams in their preseason poll, but only ranks 30 teams weekly during the season.
^{†} NCBWA ranks 35 teams in their preseason poll, but only ranks 30 teams weekly during the season.
* New poll was not released for this week so for comparison purposes the previous week's ranking is inserted in this week's slot.

== Awards ==
Weekly awards
Player	Award	Date Awarded	Ref.
Elijah Cabell	ACC Co-Player of the Week	February 24, 2020	

== 2020 MLB draft ==
Player	Position	Round	Overall	MLB team
CJ Van Eyk	RHP	2	42	Toronto Blue Jays
Shane Drohan	LHP	5	148	Boston Red Sox
