= 2020 Clemson Tigers baseball team =

American college baseball season

2020 Clemson Tigers baseball
- Conference: Atlantic Coast Conference

Ranking
- Coaches: No. 25
- CB: No. 25
- Record: 14–3 (3–0 ACC)
- Head coach: Monte Lee (5th season)
- Assistant coaches: Bradley LeCroy (13th season); Andrew See (5th season)
- Home stadium: Doug Kingsmore Stadium

2020 Atlantic Coast Conference baseball standings
	Conf.				Overall
Team	W		L	PCT	W		L	PCT
Atlantic
Notre Dame ‍‍‍	3	–	0	1.000	11	–	2	.846
No. 24 Clemson ‍‍‍	3	–	0	1.000	14	–	3	.824
No. 2 Louisville ‍‍‍	2	–	1	.667	13	–	4	.765
No. 11 NC State ‍‍‍	1	–	2	.333	14	–	3	.824
No. 15 Florida State ‍‍‍	1	–	2	.333	12	–	5	.706
Wake Forest ‍‍‍	1	–	2	.333	10	–	8	.556
Boston College ‍‍‍	0	–	3	.000	6	–	9	.400
Coastal
No. 7 Miami (FL) ‍‍‍	3	–	0	1.000	12	–	4	.750
Virginia ‍‍‍	2	–	1	.667	14	–	4	.778
No. 10 Duke ‍‍‍	2	–	1	.667	12	–	4	.750
Georgia Tech ‍‍‍	2	–	1	.667	11	–	5	.688
No. 25 Virginia Tech ‍‍‍	1	–	2	.333	11	–	5	.688
North Carolina ‍‍‍	0	–	3	.000	12	–	7	.632
Pittsburgh ‍‍‍	0	–	3	.000	10	–	6	.625
‡ – Tournament champion As of March 18, 2020; Rankings from D1Baseball

The 2020 Clemson Tigers baseball team were the varsity intercollegiate baseball team that represented Clemson University during the 2020 NCAA Division I baseball season. The Tigers competed in the Atlantic Coast Conference (ACC) and were led by fifth-year head coach Monte Lee. Clemson played its home games at Doug Kingsmore Stadium in Clemson, South Carolina.

The season was impacted by the coronavirus pandemic. On March 12, it was announced that the 2020 NCAA tournament would be canceled due to the pandemic. Clemson University suspended all events until April 5, 2020. On March 17, the ACC cancelled all spring athletic activities and thereby ended the baseball season. The Tigers finished the season 14–3 and 3–0 in ACC play.

== Previous season ==
In 2019, the Tigers finished the season 4th in the ACC's Atlantic Division with a record of 35–26, 15–15 in conference play. They qualified for the 2019 Atlantic Coast Conference baseball tournament, and were eliminated in pool play. They were invited to the 2019 NCAA Division I baseball tournament, where they played in the Oxford Regional. They defeated Illinois, but lost to Ole Miss and Jacksonville State and did not advance to the Super Regionals.

== Personnel ==
=== Roster ===
2020 Clemson Tigers roster
Pitchers: 12 – Mack Anglin – Freshman; 19 – Ryne Huggins – (redshirt) Junior; 20 – Mat Clark – (redshirt) Junior; 22 – Sam Weatherly – Junior; 23 – Carson Spiers – Senior; 25 – Jackson Lindley – Sophomore; 27 – Carter Raffield – (redshirt) Freshman; 29 – Spencer Strider – (redshirt) Sophomore; 31 – Geoffrey Gilbert – Freshman; 32 – Jacob Hennessy – Senior; 36 – Sheldon Reed – (redshirt) Senior; 37 – Nick Hoffmann – Freshman; 39 – Paul Labriola – Freshman; 42 – Ryan Ammons – Freshman; 43 – Connor O'Rear – (redshirt) Sophomore; 44 – Nick Clayton – Freshman; 45 – Holt Jones – Junior; 46 – Keyshawn Askew – Sophomore; 52 – Evan Estridge – (redshirt) Junior	Catchers: 9 – Jonathan French – Freshman; 17 – Adam Hackenberg – Sophomore; 51 – Drew Donathan – (redshirt) Sophomore; Infielders: 4 – Pierce Gallo – Freshman; 10 – Bryar Hawkins – Sophomore; 15 – James Parker – Sophomore; 24 – Mac Starbuck – (redshirt) Freshman	Outfielders: 1 – Kier Meredith – (redshirt) Sophomore; 13 – Bryce Teodosio – Junior; 16 – Bo Majkowski – Junior; 47 – Matthew Lumsden – (redshirt) Freshman; Utility: 3 – Dylan Brewer (OF/1B) – Freshman; 5 – Sam Hall (INF/OF) – Junior; 6 – Elijah Henderson (OF/INF) – (redshirt) Sophomore; 21 – J.D. Brock (P/OF) – Freshman; 26 – Matt Cooper (OF/1B/C) – Junior; 30 – Davis Sharpe (P/1B) – Sophomore; 35 – Chad Fairey (1B/OF) – Sophomore; 49 – Regan Reid (INF/OF) – Freshman

=== Coaching staff ===
2020 Clemson Tigers coaching staff
Name	Position	Seasons at Clemson
Monte Lee	Head coach	5
Bradley LeCroy	Assistant Coach	13
Andrew See	Assistant Coach	5
Jared Broughton	Volunteer Assistant Coach	1

== Schedule ==
Legend
	Clemson win
	Clemson loss
	Cancellation
**Bold**	Clemson team member
*	Non-Conference game
†	Make-Up Game

2020 Clemson Tigers baseball game log
Regular season

February
Date	Opponent	Rank	Site/stadium	Score	Win	Loss	Save	Attendance	Overall record	ACC record
Feb 14	Liberty*		Doug Kingsmore Stadium • Clemson, SC	**W** 5–3	**Gilbert** (1–0)	Meyer (0–1)	**Spiers** (1)	4,657	1–0	0–0
Feb 15	Liberty*		Doug Kingsmore Stadium • Clemson, SC	**W** 1–0	**Sharpe** (1–0)	Skirrow (0–1)	**Clayton** (1)	4,592	2–0	0–0
Feb 16	Liberty*		Doug Kingsmore Stadium • Clemson, SC	**W** 6–2	**Clark** (1–0)	Adametz (0–1)	**None**	4,109	3–0	0–0
Feb 19	Furman*		Doug Kingsmore Stadium • Clemson, SC	**W** 3–2	**Hoffmann** (1–0)	Marchal (0–1)	**Spiers** (2)	4,128	4–0	0–0
Feb 21	Stony Brook*		Doug Kingsmore Stadium • Clemson, SC	**W** 2–0	**Weatherly** (1–0)	Milch (0–1)	**Spiers** (3)	3,996	5–0	0–0
Feb 22	Stony Brook*		Doug Kingsmore Stadium • Clemson, SC	**W** 1–0 (10)	**Clayton** (1–0)	Morrisey (0–1)	None	4,584	6–0	0–0
Feb 23	Stony Brook*		Doug Kingsmore Stadium • Clemson, SC	**W** 3–1	**Spiers** (1–0)	Bonanno (0–1)	None	4,051	7–0	0–0
Feb 25	East Tennessee State*	No. 26	Doug Kingsmore Stadium • Clemson, SC	**L** 3–5	Rogers (1–0)	**Hoffmann** (1–1)	Tate (1)	3,964	7–1	0–0
Feb 28	at South Carolina*	No. 26	Founders Park • Columbia, SC	**W** 7–1	**Weatherly** (2–0)	Mlodzinski (1–1)	None	8,242	8–1	0–0
Feb 29	vs South Carolina*	No. 26	Segra Park • Columbia, SC	**L** 5–8	Farr (2–0)	**Sharpe** (1–1)	Kerry (1)	8,986	8–2	0–0

March
Date	Opponent	Rank	Site/stadium	Score	Win	Loss	Save	Attendance	Overall record	ACC record
Mar 1	South Carolina*	No. 26	Doug Kingsmore Stadium • Clemson, SC	**W** 5–2	**Clark** (2–0)	Lloyd (0–2)	**Spiers** (4)	5,655	9–2	0–0
Mar 4	College of Charleston*	No. 27	Doug Kingsmore Stadium • Clemson, SC	**L** 2–11	James (1–0)	**Anglin** (0–1)	None	3,914	9–3	0–0
Mar 6	Boston College	No. 27	Doug Kingsmore Stadium • Clemson, SC	**W** 4–3	**Spiers** (2–0)	Walsh (0–2)	None	4,057	10–3	1–0
Mar 7	Boston College	No. 27	Doug Kingsmore Stadium • Clemson, SC	**W** 12–5	**Rafield** (1–0)	Mancini (1–2)	None	4,670	11–3	2–0
Mar 8	Boston College	No. 27	Doug Kingsmore Stadium • Clemson, SC	**W** 7–6	**Spiers** (3–0)	Campbell (1–2)	None	4,130	12–3	3–0
Mar 10	Presbyterian*	No. 25	Doug Kingsmore Stadium • Clemson, SC	**W** 12–0	**Lindley** (1–0)	Dearman (0–2)	None	3,988	13–3	3–0
Mar 11	Winthrop*	No. 25	Doug Kingsmore Stadium • Clemson, SC	**W** 3–2 (11)	**Hoffmann** (2–1)	Gainey (1–1)	None	4,172	14–3	3–0
Mar 13	at Wake Forest	No. 25	David F. Couch Ballpark • Winston-Salem, NC	cancelled					0–0	0–0
Mar 14	at Wake Forest	No. 25	David F. Couch Ballpark • Winston-Salem, NC	cancelled					0–0	0–0
Mar 15	at Wake Forest	No. 25	David F. Couch Ballpark • Winston-Salem, NC	cancelled					0–0	0–0
Mar 17	at Coastal Carolina*		Springs Brooks Stadium • Conway, SC	cancelled					0–0	0–0
Mar 20	at Notre Dame		Frank Eck Stadium • South Bend, IN	cancelled					0–0	0–0
Mar 21	at Notre Dame		Frank Eck Stadium • South Bend, IN	cancelled					0–0	0–0
Mar 22	at Notre Dame		Frank Eck Stadium • South Bend, IN	cancelled					0–0	0–0
Mar 24	Coastal Carolina*		Doug Kingsmore Stadium • Clemson, SC	cancelled					0–0	0–0
Mar 27	Georgia Tech		Doug Kingsmore Stadium • Clemson, SC	cancelled					0–0	0–0
Mar 28	Georgia Tech		Doug Kingsmore Stadium • Clemson, SC	cancelled					0–0	0–0
Mar 29	Georgia Tech		Doug Kingsmore Stadium • Clemson, SC	cancelled					0–0	0–0
Mar 31	vs. College of Charleston		Segra Park • Columbia, SC	cancelled					0–0	0–0

April
Date	Opponent	Rank	Site/stadium	Score	Win	Loss	Save	Attendance	Overall record	ACC record
Apr 3	Pittsburgh		Doug Kingsmore Stadium • Clemson, SC	cancelled					0–0	0–0
Apr 4	Pittsburgh		Doug Kingsmore Stadium • Clemson, SC	cancelled					0–0	0–0
Apr 5	Pittsburgh		Doug Kingsmore Stadium • Clemson, SC	cancelled					0–0	0–0
Apr 7	at Georgia*		Foley Field • Athens, GA	cancelled					0–0	0–0
Apr 10	at Louisville		Jim Patterson Stadium • Louisville, KY	cancelled					0–0	0–0
Apr 11	at Louisville		Jim Patterson Stadium • Louisville, KY	cancelled					0–0	0–0
Apr 12	at Louisville		Jim Patterson Stadium • Louisville, KY	cancelled					0–0	0–0
Apr 14	vs Furman*		Fluor Field at the West End • Greenville, SC	cancelled					0–0	0–0
Apr 17	at Duke		Durham Bulls Athletic Park • Durham, NC	cancelled					0–0	0–0
Apr 18	at Duke		Durham Bulls Athletic Park • Durham, NC	cancelled					0–0	0–0
Apr 19	at Duke		Durham Bulls Athletic Park • Durham, NC	cancelled					0–0	0–0
Apr 21	Georgia*		Doug Kingsmore Stadium • Clemson, SC	cancelled					0–0	0–0
Apr 24	NC State		Doug Kingsmore Stadium • Clemson, SC	cancelled					0–0	0–0
Apr 25	NC State		Doug Kingsmore Stadium • Clemson, SC	cancelled					0–0	0–0
Apr 26	NC State		Doug Kingsmore Stadium • Clemson, SC	cancelled					0–0	0–0

May
Date	Opponent	Rank	Site/stadium	Score	Win	Loss	Save	Attendance	Overall record	ACC record
May 2	William & Mary*		Doug Kingsmore Stadium • Clemson, SC	cancelled					0–0	0–0
May 2	William & Mary*		Doug Kingsmore Stadium • Clemson, SC	cancelled					0–0	0–0
May 3	William & Mary*		Doug Kingsmore Stadium • Clemson, SC	cancelled					0–0	0–0
May 5	The Citadel*		Doug Kingsmore Stadium • Clemson, SC	cancelled					0–0	0–0
May 6	Charleston Southern*		Doug Kingsmore Stadium • Clemson, SC	cancelled					0–0	0–0
May 8	at Miami		Mark Light Field • Coral Gables, FL	cancelled					0–0	0–0
May 9	at Miami		Mark Light Field • Coral Gables, FL	cancelled					0–0	0–0
May 10	at Miami		Mark Light Field • Coral Gables, FL	cancelled					0–0	0–0
May 12	at The Citadel*		Joseph P. Riley Jr. Park • Charleston, SC	cancelled					0–0	0–0
May 14	Florida State		Doug Kingsmore Stadium • Clemson, SC	cancelled					0–0	0–0
May 15	Florida State		Doug Kingsmore Stadium • Clemson, SC	cancelled					0–0	0–0
May 16	Florida State		Doug Kingsmore Stadium • Clemson, SC	cancelled					0–0	0–0

Postseason

ACC Tournament
Date	Opponent	Rank	Site/stadium	Score	Win	Loss	Save	Attendance	Overall record	Tournament record
May			BB&T Ballpark • Charlotte, NC	cancelled					0–0	0–0

Note: All rankings shown are from Collegiate Baseball Poll.

== Rankings ==
Ranking movements Legend: ██ Increase in ranking ██ Decrease in ranking — = Not ranked RV = Received votes
	Week																		
Poll	Pre	1	2	3	4	5	6	7	8	9	10	11	12	13	14	15	16	17	Final
Coaches'	RV	RV*		RV	25	25													
Baseball America	—	—	—	23	22														
Collegiate Baseball^	RV	—	26	27	25	25													
NCBWA†	RV	RV	29	27	25														
D1Baseball	—	—	—	—	24														

^ Collegiate Baseball ranked 40 teams in their preseason poll, but only ranked 30 teams weekly during the season.
† NCBWA ranks 30 teams in their preseason poll, but only ranks 25 teams weekly during the season.
* A new poll was not released for this week, so for comparison purposes, the previous week's ranking is inserted in this week's slot.

== 2020 MLB draft ==
Player	Position	Round	Overall	MLB team
Sam Weatherly	LHP	3	81	Colorado Rockies
Spencer Strider	RHP	4	126	Atlanta Braves
