= 2020 Atlantic Coast Conference baseball tournament =

Canceled college baseball tournament

- Format: See below
- Finals site: BB&T Ballpark; Charlotte, North Carolina

2020 Atlantic Coast Conference baseball standings
	Conf.				Overall
Team	W		L	PCT	W		L	PCT
Atlantic
Notre Dame ‍‍‍	3	–	0	1.000	11	–	2	.846
No. 24 Clemson ‍‍‍	3	–	0	1.000	14	–	3	.824
No. 2 Louisville ‍‍‍	2	–	1	.667	13	–	4	.765
No. 11 NC State ‍‍‍	1	–	2	.333	14	–	3	.824
No. 15 Florida State ‍‍‍	1	–	2	.333	12	–	5	.706
Wake Forest ‍‍‍	1	–	2	.333	10	–	8	.556
Boston College ‍‍‍	0	–	3	.000	6	–	9	.400
Coastal
No. 7 Miami (FL) ‍‍‍	3	–	0	1.000	12	–	4	.750
Virginia ‍‍‍	2	–	1	.667	14	–	4	.778
No. 10 Duke ‍‍‍	2	–	1	.667	12	–	4	.750
Georgia Tech ‍‍‍	2	–	1	.667	11	–	5	.688
No. 25 Virginia Tech ‍‍‍	1	–	2	.333	11	–	5	.688
North Carolina ‍‍‍	0	–	3	.000	12	–	7	.632
Pittsburgh ‍‍‍	0	–	3	.000	10	–	6	.625
‡ – Tournament champion As of March 18, 2020; Rankings from D1Baseball

The 2020 Atlantic Coast Conference baseball tournament was scheduled to be held from May 19 through 24 at BB&T Ballpark in Charlotte, North Carolina. The annual tournament determines the conference champion of the Division I Atlantic Coast Conference for college baseball. The tournament champion was to receive the league's automatic bid to the 2020 NCAA Division I baseball tournament. This was scheduled to be the last of 19 athletic championship events held by the conference in the 2019–20 academic year.

On March 12, 2020, the NCAA cancelled all winter and spring sports championships due to the coronavirus pandemic, thus cancelling the tournament. This was the first time the tournament wasn't held since 1979, and the second time since the inaugural tournament in 1973.
