= Chris McMahon =

American baseball player (born 1999)

Free agent
- Pitcher
- Born: February 4, 1999 (age 27); West Chester, Pennsylvania, U.S.
- Bats: Right Throws: Right

Christopher James McMahon (born February 4, 1999) is an American professional baseball pitcher who is a free agent.

== Amateur career ==
McMahon attended Rustin High School in West Chester, Pennsylvania, where he played baseball and basketball. In 2017, his senior year, he went 8–0 with a 0.77 ERA over 54 1/3 innings. He was selected by the Atlanta Braves in the 33rd round of the 2017 Major League Baseball draft, but did not sign and instead enrolled at the University of Miami where he played college baseball for the Miami Hurricanes.

As a freshman at Miami in 2018, McMahon appeared in six games (four starts) in which he went 1–1 with a 4.44 ERA over 26 1/3 innings. He missed time during the season after undergoing knee surgery. In 2019, his sophomore year, he made only 12 starts on the season due to an arm injury - over 60 1/3 innings, he pitched to a 3–2 record and a 3.72 ERA with 67 strikeouts. That summer, he played for the USA Baseball Collegiate National Team. As a junior in 2020, McMahon went 3–0 with a 1.05 ERA over four starts before the college baseball season was cut short due to the COVID-19 pandemic.

== Professional career ==
=== Colorado Rockies ===
McMahon was selected by the Colorado Rockies in the second round (46th overall) of the 2020 Major League Baseball draft. He signed for $1.6 million. He did not play a minor league game in 2020 due to the cancellation of the minor league season caused by the pandemic.

McMahon was assigned to the Spokane Indians of the High-A West for the 2021 season, appearing in 22 games (making twenty starts) and going 10-3 with a 4.17 ERA and 119 strikeouts over 114 1/3 innings. He opened the 2022 season on the injured list with a lat strain. He pitched a total of 28 2/3 innings for the year between the Rookie-level Arizona Complex League Diamondbacks and Spokane, going 1-0 with a 5.34 ERA and 25 strikeouts. For the 2023 season, McMahon was assigned to the Hartford Yard Goats of the Double-A Eastern League. Over 15 starts, he went 2-3 with a 5.91 ERA and 66 strikeouts over 67 innings. He was selected to play in the Arizona Fall League for the Salt River Rafters after the season. He was released from the Rockies organization on February 3, 2026.

=== Hagerstown Flying Boxcars ===
On June 4, 2026, McMahon signed with the Hagerstown Flying Boxcars of the Atlantic League of Professional Baseball. He gave up seven runs across 4 1/3 innings pitched with the team and was released on June 23.
