= 2020 NCAA Division I baseball rankings =

2020 NCAA Division I baseball season
- Duration: February 14, 2020–June 2020
- Number of teams: 300
- Preseason No. 1: Louisville (CB, D1); Vanderbilt (BA, Coaches, NCBWA)

Tournament

College World Series

Seasons
- ← 2019 2021 →

The following human polls make up the 2020 NCAA Division I men's baseball rankings. The USA Today/ESPN Coaches Poll is voted on by a panel of 31 Division I baseball coaches. The Baseball America poll is voted on by staff members of the Baseball America magazine. These polls, along with the Perfect Game USA poll, rank the top 25 teams nationally. Collegiate Baseball and the National Collegiate Baseball Writers Association rank the top 30 teams nationally.

== Legend ==
	Increase in ranking
	Decrease in ranking
	Not ranked previous week
Italics	Number of first place votes
(#–#)	Win–loss record
т	Tied with team above or below also with this symbol

== ESPN/USA Today Coaches Poll ==
	Preseason Jan 23	Week 3 Mar 2	Week 4 Mar 9	Week 5 Mar 16	Week 6	Week 7	Week 8	Week 9	Week 10	Week 11	Week 12	Week 13	Week 14	Week 15	Final	
1.	Vanderbilt (20)	Florida (26) (11–0)	Florida (28) (16–0)	Florida (28) (16–1)												1.
2.	Louisville (10)	UCLA (4) (11–0)	Georgia (14–2)	Georgia (14–4)												2.
3.	Texas Tech	Georgia (11–1)	Texas Tech (1) (16–1)	Texas Tech (16–3)												3.
4.	Georgia	Texas Tech (11–1)	UCLA (1) (13–2)	UCLA (13–2)												4.
5.	Arkansas	Vanderbilt (10–3)	Ole Miss (14–1)	Ole Miss (16–1)												5.
6.	Mississippi State	Louisville (1) (8–3)	Louisville (11–4)	Louisville (13–4)												6.
7.	Miami (FL)	NC State (11–0)	Vanderbilt (12–5)	Vanderbilt (13–5)												7.
8.	UCLA	Ole Miss (10–1)	Miami (FL) (11–4)	Miami (FL) (12–4)												8.
9.	Auburn	Miami (FL) (8–3)	NC State (13–2)	NC State (14–3)												9.
10.	Florida	Arkansas (7–3)	Arizona State (13–4)	Arizona State (13–4)												10.
11.	Michigan	Tennessee (12–0)	Duke (12–3)	Duke (12–4)												11.
12.	LSU	Duke (9–2)	UCF (15–2)	UCF (15–3)												12.
13.	Arizona State	Arizona State (8–4)	Oklahoma (13–4)	Oklahoma (14–4)												13.
14.	Florida State	Florida State (8–3)	Auburn (13–3)	Arkansas (11–5)												14.
15.	Stanford	UCF (11–2)	Arkansas (9–5)	Auburn (13–5)												15.
16.	North Carolina	Oklahoma (9–3)	Florida State (10–5)	Florida State (12–5)												16.
17.	Oklahoma State	Auburn (10–3)	Mississippi State (10–4)	Mississippi State (12–4)												17.
18.	NC State	TCU (10–1)	Long Beach State (10–5)	Long Beach State (10–5)												18.
19.	East Carolina	Mississippi State (7–4)	LSU (11–5)	LSU (12–5)												19.
20.	Duke	Michigan (6–4)	Tennessee (14–2)	Tennessee (15–2)												20.
21.	Texas A&M	Long Beach State (8–3)	Alabama (15–1)	Alabama (16–1)												21.
22.	Georgia Tech	Texas (10–2)т	Texas (13–3)	Texas (15–2)												22.
23.	Ole Miss	LSU (7–5)т	Texas A&M (14–3)	Texas A&M (15–3)												23.
24.	Wake Forest	Texas A&M (10–3)	Pepperdine (12–3)	Pepperdine (12–3)												24.
25.	Oregon State	Alabama (12–0)	Clemson (12–3)	Clemson (14–3)												25.
	Preseason Jan 23	Week 3 Mar 2	Week 4 Mar 9	Week 5 Mar 16	Week 6	Week 7	Week 8	Week 9	Week 10	Week 11	Week 12	Week 13	Week 14	Week 15	Final	
		Dropped: No. 15 Stanford; No. 16 North Carolina; No. 17 Oklahoma State; No. 19 East Carolina; No. 22 Georgia Tech; No. 24 Wake Forest; No. 25 Oregon State	Dropped: No. 18 TCU; No. 20 Michigan	None	None	None	None	None	None	None	None	None	None	None	None	

== Baseball America ==
	Preseason Jan 20	Week 1 Feb 17	Week 2 Feb 24	Week 3 Mar 2	Week 4 Mar 9	Week 5	Week 6	Week 7	Week 8	Week 9	Week 10	Week 11	Week 12	Week 13	Week 14	Week 15	Final	
1.	Vanderbilt	Michigan (3–1)	Florida (8–0)	Florida (11–0)	Florida (16–0)													1.
2.	Louisville	Florida (3–0)	Texas Tech (6–1)	Texas Tech (11–1)	Texas Tech (16–1)													2.
3.	Arizona State	Miami (FL) (3–0)	Vanderbilt (6–2)	Vanderbilt (10–3)	Georgia (14–2)													3.
4.	Florida	Texas Tech (4–0)	Mississippi State (5–1)	Georgia (11–1)	UCLA (13–2)													4.
5.	Miami (FL)	Vanderbilt (1–2)	Michigan (4–3)	UCLA (11–0)	Miami (FL) (11–4)													5.
6.	Texas Tech	Louisville (1–2)	Miami (FL) (4–3)	Miami (FL) (8–3)	Louisville (11–4)													6.
7.	Georgia	Georgia (3–0)	Louisville (4–3)	Louisville (8–3)	Arizona State (13–4)													7.
8.	Michigan	Arizona State (2–2)	Arizona State (5–3)	Arizona State (8–4)	Ole Miss (14–1)													8.
9.	Mississippi State	Mississippi State (3–0)	Arkansas (7–0)	Ole Miss (10–1)	Oklahoma (13–4)													9.
10.	UCLA	UCLA (3–0)	Georgia (7–1)	Michigan (6–4)	Duke (12–3)													10.
11.	Arkansas	Arkansas (3–0)	UCLA (7–0)	Oklahoma (9–3)	Vanderbilt (12–5)													11.
12.	Florida State	Auburn (4–0)	Florida State (6–1)	Mississippi State (7–4)	Long Beach State (10–5)													12.
13.	Auburn	LSU (2–1)	Ole Miss (6–1)	Arkansas (7–3)	Mississippi State (10–4)													13.
14.	LSU	Florida State (2–1)	LSU (5–3)	Florida State (8–3)	Arkansas (9–5)													14.
15.	Duke	Ole Miss (2–1)	Oklahoma (7–2)	NC State (11–0)	UCF (15–2)													15.
16.	Oklahoma State	Oklahoma (2–1)	Duke (6–1)	Duke (9–2)	Pepperdine (12–3)													16.
17.	NC State	Duke (2–1)	NC State (7–0)	Long Beach State (8–3)	Virginia (12–4)													17.
18.	North Carolina	NC State (3–0)	Dallas Baptist (6–1)	Tennessee (12–0)	NC State (13–2)													18.
19.	Oklahoma	North Carolina (3–0)	Georgia Tech (6–1)	UCF (11–2)	Florida State (10–5)													19.
20.	Wake Forest	Wake Forest (3–1)	East Carolina (6–1)	LSU (7–5)	LSU (11–5)													20.
21.	Georgia Tech	Georgia Tech (2–1)	UCF (7–1)	Dallas Baptist (8–3)	Dallas Baptist (11–4)													21.
22.	Arizona	Arizona (3–0)	North Carolina (6–2)	TCU (10–1)	Clemson (12–3)													22.
23.	Dallas Baptist	Dallas Baptist (3–0)	Oklahoma State (5–2)	Clemson (9–2)	Tennessee (14–2)													23.
24.	Ohio State	Oklahoma State (1–2)	Auburn (5–3)	Auburn (10–3)	East Carolina (12–3)													24.
25.	East Carolina	East Carolina (3–0)	Arizona (5–2)	East Carolina (8–3)	Michigan (8–7)													25.
	Preseason Jan 20	Week 1 Feb 17	Week 2 Feb 24	Week 3 Mar 2	Week 4 Mar 9	Week 5	Week 6	Week 7	Week 8	Week 9	Week 10	Week 11	Week 12	Week 13	Week 14	Week 15	Final	
		Dropped: No. 24 Ohio State	Dropped: No. 20 Wake Forest	Dropped: No. 19 Georgia Tech; No. 22 North Carolina; No. 23 Oklahoma State; No. 25 Arizona	Dropped: No. 22 TCU; No. 24 Auburn	None	None	None	None	None	None	None	None	None	None	None	None	

== Collegiate Baseball ==
	Preseason Dec 16	Week 1 Feb 17	Week 2 Feb 24	Week 3 Mar 2	Week 4 Mar 9	Week 5 Mar 16	Week 6	Week 7	Week 8	Week 9	Week 10	Week 11	Week 12	Week 13	Week 14	Week 15	Week 16	Week 17	Week 18	
1.	Louisville	Texas Tech (4–0)	UCLA (7–0)	UCLA (11–0)	Florida (16–0)	Florida (16–1)														1.
2.	Vanderbilt	Miami (FL) (3–0)	Florida (8–0)	Florida (11–0)	Texas Tech (16–1)	UCLA (13–2)														2.
3.	Texas Tech	Michigan (3–1)	Arkansas (7–0)	Texas Tech (11–1)	UCLA (13–2)	Ole Miss (16–1)														3.
4.	Miami (FL)	Louisville (1–2)	Texas Tech (6–1)	Georgia (11–1)	Georgia (14–2)	Louisville (13–4)														4.
5.	Arizona State	Vanderbilt (1–2)	Vanderbilt (6–2)	Vanderbilt (10–3)	Louisville (11–4)	Vanderbilt (13–5)														5.
6.	Mississippi State	Mississippi State (3–0)	Mississippi State (5–1)	Louisville (8–3)	Ole Miss (14–1)	Mississippi State (12–4)														6.
7.	Georgia	Georgia (3–0)	Louisville (4–3)	NC State (11–0)	Vanderbilt (12–5)	Texas Tech (16–3)														7.
8.	Auburn	Auburn (4–0)	Georgia (7–1)	Ole Miss (10–1)	Arizona State (13–4)	Arizona State (13–4)														8.
9.	Arkansas	Arkansas (3–0)	Michigan (4–3)	Miami (FL) (8–3)	Miami (FL) (11–4)	Miami (FL) (12–4)														9.
10.	Michigan	UCLA (3–0)	NC State (7–0)	Arizona State (8–4)	Mississippi State (10–4)	Georgia (14–4)														10.
11.	LSU	Arizona State (2–2)	Florida State (6–1)	Michigan (6–4)	NC State (13–2)	NC State (14–3)														11.
12.	UCLA	LSU (2–1)	Arizona State (5–3)	Mississippi State (7–4)	UCF (15–2)	UCF (15–3)														12.
13.	North Carolina	North Carolina (3–0)	Miami (FL) (4–3)	Arkansas (7–3)	Auburn (13–3)	Florida State (12–5)														13.
14.	Florida	Florida (3–0)	Ole Miss (6–1)	Florida State (8–3)	Duke (12–3)	Arkansas (11–5)														14.
15.	Florida State	Florida State (2–1)	Texas A&M (8–0)	UCF (11–2)	Arkansas (9–5)	Texas (14–3)														15.
16.	NC State	NC State (3–0)	Texas (8–0)	Tennessee (12–0)	Florida State (10–5)	Texas A&M (15–3)														16.
17.	Wake Forest	Wake Forest (3–1)	UCF (7–1)	Auburn (10–3)	Texas (13–3)	LSU (12–5)														17.
18.	Arizona	Arizona (3–0)	Auburn (5–3)	TCU (10–1)	Texas A&M (14–3)	Alabama (16–1)														18.
19.	Oklahoma State	Ole Miss (2–1)	LSU (5–3)	Texas (10–2)	LSU (11–5)	Auburn (13–5)														19.
20.	TCU	TCU (3–0)	North Carolina (6–2)	Texas A&M (10–3)	Alabama (15–1)	Pepperdine (12–3)														20.
21.	Texas A&M	Texas A&M (3–0)	TCU (5–1)	Long Beach State (8–3)	Pepperdine (12–3)	Tennessee (15–2)														21.
22.	Texas	Texas (3–0)	Pepperdine (7–0)	LSU (7–5)	Tennessee (14–2)	Duke (12–4)														22.
23.	South Alabama	East Carolina (3–0)	Tennessee (7–0)	Alabama (12–0)	Virginia (12–4)	Virginia (14–4)														23.
24.	Louisiana	Central Michigan (3–1)	East Carolina (6–1)	Pepperdine (10–1)	Notre Dame (10–2)	Notre Dame (11–2)														24.
25.	Stanford	Cal State Fullerton (2–1)	Long Beach State (5–2)	North Carolina (8–4)	Clemson (12–3)	Clemson (14–3)														25.
26.	Cal State Fullerton	UC Santa Barbara (2–1)	Clemson (7–0)	Duke (9–2)	UC Santa Barbara (13–2)	UC Santa Barbara (13–2)														26.
27.	UC Santa Barbara	Grand Canyon (2–1)	Central Michigan (5–2)	Clemson (9–2)	Long Beach State (10–5)	Long Beach State (10–5)														27.
28.	Georgia Tech	Oklahoma State (1–2)	Oklahoma State (5–2)	Oklahoma (9–3)	Oklahoma (13–4)	Oklahoma (14–4)														28.
29.	Minnesota	Georgia Tech (2–1)	Tulane (6–1)	Tulane (9–2)	Tulane (13–2)	Tulane (15–2)														29.
30.	Oklahoma	South Alabama (2–1)	Georgia Tech (6–1)	UC Santa Barbara (9–2)	Wichita State (13–2)	Wichita State (13–2)														30.
	Preseason Dec 16	Week 1 Feb 17	Week 2 Feb 24	Week 3 Mar 2	Week 4 Mar 9	Week 5 Mar 16	Week 6	Week 7	Week 8	Week 9	Week 10	Week 11	Week 12	Week 13	Week 14	Week 15	Week 16	Week 17	Week 18	
		Dropped: No. 24 Louisiana; No. 25 Stanford; No. 29 Minnesota; No. 30 Oklahoma	Dropped: No. 17 Wake Forest; No. 18 Arizona; No. 25 Cal State Fullerton; No. 26 UC Santa Barbara; No. 27 Grand Canyon; No. 30 South Alabama	Dropped: No. 24 East Carolina; No. 27 Central Michigan; No. 28 Oklahoma State; No. 30 Georgia Tech	Dropped: No. 11 Michigan; No. 18 TCU; No. 25 North Carolina	None	None	None	None	None	None	None	None	None	None	None	None	None	None	

The Preseason poll ranked the top 40 teams in the nation. Teams not listed above are: 31. San Diego State; 32. Oregon State; 33. BYU; 34. UConn; 35. Houston; 36. East Carolina; 37. UC Irvine; 38. Central Michigan; 39 Ball State; 40. Florida Atlantic.

== NCBWA ==
	Preseason Feb 3	Week 1 Feb 17	Week 2 Feb 24	Week 3 Mar 2	Week 4 Mar 9	Week 5	Week 6	Week 7	Week 8	Week 9	Week 10	Week 11	Week 12	Week 13	Week 14	Week 15	Week 16	Week 17	Week 18	
1.	Vanderbilt	Texas Tech (4–0)	Florida (8–0)	Florida (11–0)	Florida (16–0)															1.
2.	Louisville	Miami (FL) (3–0)	Arkansas (7–0)	Texas Tech (11–1)	Texas Tech (16–1)															2.
3.	Texas Tech	Georgia (3–0)	Texas Tech (6–1)	Georgia (11–1)	Georgia (14–2)															3.
4.	Georgia	Vanderbilt (1–2)	Vanderbilt (6–2)	Vanderbilt (10–3)	UCLA (13–2)															4.
5.	Miami (FL)	Florida (3–0)	Georgia (7–1)	UCLA (11–0)	Louisville (11–4)															5.
6.	Arkansas	Arkansas (3–0)	Mississippi State (5–1)	Louisville (8–3)	Vanderbilt (12–5)															6.
7.	Arizona State	Mississippi State (3–0)	UCLA (7–0)	NC State (11–0)	Miami (FL) (11–4)															7.
8.	Florida	Louisville (1–2)	NC State (7–0)	Miami (FL) (8–3)	Ole Miss (14–1)															8.
9.	Mississippi State	Michigan (3–1)	Louisville (4–3)	Arizona State (8–4)	Arizona State (13–4)															9.
10.	Auburn	Auburn (4–0)	Miami (FL) (4–3)	Ole Miss (10–1)	NC State (13–2)															10.
11.	UCLA	UCLA (3–0)	Arizona State (5–3)	Arkansas (7–3)	Duke (12–3)															11.
12.	Michigan	NC State (3–0)	Florida State (6–1)	Duke (9–2)	Oklahoma (13–4)															12.
13.	LSU	LSU (2–1)	Texas A&M (8–0)	Mississippi State (7–4)	Mississippi State (10–4)															13.
14.	Florida State	Arizona State (2–2)	Duke (6–1)	Florida State (8–3)	UCF (15–2)															14.
15.	Duke	Florida State (2–1)	Ole Miss (6–1)	Oklahoma (9–3)	Auburn (13–3)															15.
16.	Stanford	East Carolina (3–0)	LSU (5–3)	Tennessee (12–0)	Arkansas (9–5)															16.
17.	NC State	North Carolina (2–0)	East Carolina (6–1)	Michigan (6–4)	Florida State (10–5)															17.
18.	Oklahoma State	Duke (2–1)	Michigan (4–3)	Auburn (10–3)	LSU (11–5)															18.
19.	North Carolina	Texas A&M (3–0)	Georgia Tech (6–1)	UCF (11–2)	East Carolina (12–3)															19.
20.	East Carolina	Ole Miss (2–1)	Oklahoma (7–2)	TCU (10–1)	Texas A&M (14–3)															20.
21.	Texas A&M	Wake Forest (3–1)	Auburn (5–3)	LSU (7–5)	Tennessee (14–2)															21.
22.	Georgia Tech	Georgia Tech (2–1)	Dallas Baptist (6–1)	East Carolina (7–3)	Dallas Baptist (11–4)															22.
23.	Wake Forest	Arizona (3–0)	North Carolina (6–2)	Texas A&M (10–3)	Long Beach State (10–5)															23.
24.	Oklahoma	Oklahoma (2–1)	Tennessee (7–0)	Long Beach State (8–3)	Alabama (15–1)															24.
25.	Ole Miss	TCU (3–0)	UCF (7–1)	Dallas Baptist (8–3)	Clemson (12–3)															25.
26.	Arizona	Stanford (1–2)	TCU (5–1)	Alabama (12–0)	Pepperdine (12–3)															26.
27.	Dallas Baptist	Dallas Baptist (3–0)	Texas (8–0)	Clemson (9–2)	Michigan (8–7)															27.
28.	TCU	Cal State Fullerton (2–1)	Oklahoma State (5–2)	Texas (10–2)	Tulane (13–2)															28.
29.	Oregon State	Oklahoma State (1–2)	Clemson (7–0)	Georgia Tech (7–4)	TCU (11–4)															29.
30.	Texas	Texas (3–0)	Arizona (5–2)	Pepperdine (10–1)	Texas (13–3)															30.
	Preseason Feb 3	Week 1 Feb 17	Week 2 Feb 24	Week 3 Mar 2	Week 4 Mar 9	Week 5	Week 6	Week 7	Week 8	Week 9	Week 10	Week 11	Week 12	Week 13	Week 14	Week 15	Week 16	Week 17	Week 18	
		Dropped: No. 29 Oregon State	Dropped: No. 21 Wake Forest; No. 26 Stanford; No. 28 Cal State Fullerton	Dropped: No. 23 North Carolina; No. 28 Oklahoma State; No. 30 Arizona	Dropped: No. 29 Georgia Tech	None	None	None	None	None	None	None	None	None	None	None	None	None	None	

The Preseason poll ranked the top 35 teams in the nation. Teams not listed above are: 31. Southern Miss 32. Ohio State 33. Miami (OH) 34. UC Santa Barbara 35. West Virginia

== D1Baseball ==
	Preseason Jan 13	Week 1 Feb 17	Week 2 Feb 24	Week 3 Mar 2	Week 4 Mar 9	Week 5	Week 6	Week 7	Week 8	Week 9	Week 10	Week 11	Week 12	Week 13	Week 14	Week 15	Week 16	Week 17	Week 18	
1.	Louisville	Miami (FL) (3–0)	Florida (8–0)	Florida (11–0)	Florida (16–0)															1.
2.	Vanderbilt	Florida (3–0)	Vanderbilt (6–2)	Vanderbilt (10–3)	Louisville (11–4)															2.
3.	Miami (FL)	Louisville (1–2)	Louisville (4–3)	Louisville (8–3)	Georgia (14–2)															3.
4.	Florida	Vanderbilt (1–2)	Georgia (7–1)	Georgia (11–1)	Texas Tech (16–1)															4.
5.	Georgia	Georgia (3–0)	Texas Tech (6–1)	Texas Tech (11–1)	UCLA (13–2)															5.
6.	Texas Tech	Texas Tech (4–0)	Arkansas (7–0)	UCLA (11–0)	Vanderbilt (12–5)															6.
7.	Arkansas	Arkansas (3–0)	Miami (FL) (4–3)	Miami (FL) (8–3)	Miami (FL) (11–4)															7.
8.	Auburn	Auburn (4–0)	Mississippi State (5–1)	NC State (11–0)	Ole Miss (14–1)															8.
9.	Arizona State	Michigan (3–1)	Florida State (6–1)	Ole Miss (10–1)	Arizona State (13–4)															9.
10.	Mississippi State	Mississippi State (3–0)	UCLA (7–0)	Arizona State (8–4)	Duke (12–3)															10.
11.	LSU	LSU (2–1)	LSU (5–3)	Florida State (8–3)	NC State (13–2)															11.
12.	Florida State	Florida State (2–1)	Arizona State (5–3)	Duke (9–2)	UCF (15–2)															12.
13.	Michigan	Arizona State (2–2)	NC State (7–0)	Arkansas (7–3)	Oklahoma (13–4)															13.
14.	UCLA	UCLA (3–0)	Duke (6–1)	UCF (11–2)	Arkansas (9–5)															14.
15.	Duke	NC State (3–0)	Ole Miss (6–1)	Oklahoma (9–3)	Florida State (10–5)															15.
16.	NC State	Duke (2–1)	Michigan (4–3)	Michigan (6–4)	Long Beach State (10–5)															16.
17.	Stanford	Ole Miss (2–1)	Georgia Tech (6–1)	Long Beach State (8–3)	Mississippi State (10–4)															17.
18.	Wake Forest	Wake Forest (3–1)	Texas A&M (8–0)	Mississippi State (7–4)	Auburn (13–3)															18.
19.	Georgia Tech	Georgia Tech (2–1)	UCF (7–1)	Auburn (10–3)	LSU (11–5)															19.
20.	Texas A&M	Texas A&M (3–0)	Auburn (5–3)	Tennessee (12–0)	Tulane (13–2)															20.
21.	East Carolina	East Carolina (3–0)	East Carolina (6–1)	LSU (7–5)	Pepperdine (12–3)															21.
22.	Oklahoma State	North Carolina (3–0)	Oklahoma (7–2)	TCU (10–1)	Dallas Baptist (11–4)															22.
23.	North Carolina	Oklahoma (2–1)	Dallas Baptist (6–1)	Tulane (9–2)	UC Santa Barbara (13–2)															23.
24.	Oklahoma	Cal State Fullerton (2–1)	Tennessee (7–0)	Pepperdine (10–1)	Clemson (12–3)															24.
25.	Ole Miss	Stanford (1–2)	Long Beach State (5–2)	Dallas Baptist (8–3)	Virginia (12–4)															25.
	Preseason Jan 13	Week 1 Feb 17	Week 2 Feb 24	Week 3 Mar 2	Week 4 Mar 9	Week 5	Week 6	Week 7	Week 8	Week 9	Week 10	Week 11	Week 12	Week 13	Week 14	Week 15	Week 16	Week 17	Week 18	
		Dropped: No 22. Oklahoma State	Dropped: No. 18 Wake Forest; No. 22 North Carolina; No. 24 Cal State Fullerton; No. 25 Stanford	Dropped: No. 17 Georgia Tech; No. 18 Texas A&M; No. 21 East Carolina	Dropped: No. 16 Michigan; No. 20 Tennessee; No. 22 TCU	None	None	None	None	None	None	None	None	None	None	None	None	None	None	
