= Nick Swiney =

American baseball player (born 1999)

Free agent
- Pitcher
- Born: February 12, 1999 (age 27); Nashville, Tennessee, U.S.
- Bats: Right Throws: Left

Nicholas Edwards Swiney (born February 12, 1999) is an American professional baseball pitcher who is a free agent.

== Early life ==
Nicholas Edwards Swiney was born on February 12, 1999, in Nashville, Tennessee. He attended William A. Hough High School in Cornelius, North Carolina. At Hough, Swiney set the school records for wins (24), strikeout (235), and earned run average (1.03). During his senior year, Swiney went 7–1, posting a 0.80 earned run average (ERA) and 74 strikeouts across 52 1/3 innings pitched. This effort earned Swiney NC All-State Honors and MECKA Conference Pitcher of the year in 2017.

== College career ==
Swiney attended college at North Carolina State University. During his college career, he went 15-1 posting a 3.51 earned run average and 174 strikeouts in 115 1/3 innings of work. Starting his college career coming out of the bullpen, his freshman campaign proved to be a year of growth as his performance increased his sophomore and junior seasons. In 2019, Swiney played collegiate summer baseball with the Cotuit Kettleers of the Cape Cod Baseball League. While his final year was cut short by the COVID-19 pandemic, he earned Collegiate Baseball second team All-American honors. During his excellent Junior season, he went started 4 games going 4-0 posting a 1.29 earned run average and 42 strikeouts in 28 innings.

== Professional career ==
=== San Francisco Giants ===
Swiney was drafted by the San Francisco Giants in the second round of the 2020 Major League Baseball draft. The 67th overall pick used on Swiney was the compensatory pick awarded to the Giants for Madison Bumgarner. He did not play in a game in 2020 due to the cancellation of the minor league season because of the COVID-19 pandemic.

Swiney made his professional debut in 2021 with the Low–A San Jose Giants. In his first game, Swiney went four innings with six strikeouts, while giving up only one hit. Swiney is currently ranked 15th on the San Francisco Giants' top 30 prospect list.

Swiney spent 2022 with the High-A Eugene Emeralds, registering a 4-6 record and 3.84 ERA with 105 strikeouts in 89 innings pitched across 21 games (20 starts). He split the 2023 season between the Double-A Richmond Flying Squirrels and Triple-A Sacramento River Cats. In 32 appearances out of the bullpen for the two affiliates, Swiney accumulated a 3-2 record and 4.37 ERA with 48 strikeouts across 55 2/3 innings pitched. Swiney returned to Richmond in 2024, making 41 appearances and posting a 5.25 ERA with 79 strikeouts.

=== Houston Astros ===
On December 11, 2024, Swiney was selected by the Houston Astros in the minor league phase of the Rule 5 draft. He made 24 appearances (two starts) for the High-A Asheville Tourists, logging a 3-4 record and 5.51 ERA with 45 strikeouts and one save over 49 innings of work. Swiney was released by the Astros organization on August 5, 2025.
