= 2020 Louisville Cardinals baseball team =

American college baseball season

2020 Louisville Cardinals baseball
- Conference: Atlantic Coast Conference

Ranking
- Coaches: No. 6
- CB: No. 4
- Record: 13–4 (2–1 ACC)
- Head coach: Dan McDonnell (14th season)
- Assistant coaches: Roger Williams (14th season); Eric Snider (6th season); Adam Vrable (6th season)
- Home stadium: Jim Patterson Stadium

2020 Atlantic Coast Conference baseball standings
	Conf.				Overall
Team	W		L	PCT	W		L	PCT
Atlantic
Notre Dame ‍‍‍	3	–	0	1.000	11	–	2	.846
No. 24 Clemson ‍‍‍	3	–	0	1.000	14	–	3	.824
No. 2 Louisville ‍‍‍	2	–	1	.667	13	–	4	.765
No. 11 NC State ‍‍‍	1	–	2	.333	14	–	3	.824
No. 15 Florida State ‍‍‍	1	–	2	.333	12	–	5	.706
Wake Forest ‍‍‍	1	–	2	.333	10	–	8	.556
Boston College ‍‍‍	0	–	3	.000	6	–	9	.400
Coastal
No. 7 Miami (FL) ‍‍‍	3	–	0	1.000	12	–	4	.750
Virginia ‍‍‍	2	–	1	.667	14	–	4	.778
No. 10 Duke ‍‍‍	2	–	1	.667	12	–	4	.750
Georgia Tech ‍‍‍	2	–	1	.667	11	–	5	.688
No. 25 Virginia Tech ‍‍‍	1	–	2	.333	11	–	5	.688
North Carolina ‍‍‍	0	–	3	.000	12	–	7	.632
Pittsburgh ‍‍‍	0	–	3	.000	10	–	6	.625
‡ – Tournament champion As of March 18, 2020; Rankings from D1Baseball

The 2020 Louisville Cardinals baseball team represented the University of Louisville during the 2020 NCAA Division I baseball season. The Cardinals played their home games at Jim Patterson Stadium.

== Previous season ==
The Cardinals finished the 2019 season with a 51–18 record, compiling a 21–9 mark in the ACC.

=== 2019 MLB draft ===
The Cardinals had eight players drafted in the 2019 MLB draft.

Player	Position	Round	Overall	MLB Team
Logan Wyatt	First Base	2	51	San Francisco Giants
Michael McAvene	Pitcher	3	103	Chicago Cubs
Tyler Fitzgerald	Shortstop	4	116	San Francisco Giants
Nick Bennett	Pitcher	6	193	Milwaukee Brewers
Bryan Hoeing	Pitcher	7	201	Miami Marlins
Jake Snider	Centerfield	20	604	Pittsburgh Pirates
Drew Campbell	Centerfield	23	697	Atlanta Braves
**Michael Prosecky**	Pitcher	35	1050	Philadelphia Phillies
Shay Smiddy	Pitcher	36	1088	Tampa Bay Rays

Players in bold are signees drafted from high school that will attend Louisville.

== Personnel ==
=== Roster ===
2020 Louisville Cardinals roster
**Pitchers**: 4 – Adam Elliott – Senior; 15 – Bobby Miller – Junior; 17 – Shane Harris – Freshman; 19 – Ryan Hawks – Freshman; 26 – Kerry Wright – Sophomore; 27 – Evan Webster – Freshman; 28 – Kellan Tulio – Freshman; 30 – Michael Prosecky – Freshman; 31 – Carter Lohman – Sophomore; 33 – Michael Kirian – Junior; 35 – Garrett Schmeltz – Sophomore; 36 – Glenn Albanese – Junior; 39 – Jack Perkins – Sophomore; 40 – Tate Kuehner – Freshman; 42 – Reid Detmers – Junior; 43 – Duncan Hall – Freshman; 44 – Gavin Sullivan – Junior; 45 – Luke Smith – Senior	**Catchers**: 22 – Ben Metzinger – Sophomore; 32 – Henry Davis – Sophomore; **Infielders**: 1 – Drew Wiegman – Freshman; 2 – Andrew Benefield – Sophomore; 10 – Tim Borden II – Sophomore; 13 – Alex Binelas – Sophomore; 16 – Justin Lavey – Senior	**Outfielders**: 5 – Levi Usher – Sophomore; 8 – Luke Brown – Junior; 9 – Danny Oriente – Senior; 11 – Chris Seng – Sophomore; 14 – Trey Leonard – Junior; 29 – Tyeler Hawkins – Freshman; **Utility**: 6 – Ben Bianco (C/1B) – Junior; 7 – Lucas Dunn (INF/OF) – Junior; 20 – Dalton Rushing (C/1B) – Freshman; 24 – Cameron Masterman (INF/OF) – Junior; 25 – Jared Poland (INF/P) – Sophomore; 34 – Zach Britton (OF/C) – Junior

=== Coaching staff ===
2020 Louisville Cardinals coaching staff
Name	Position	Seasons at Louisville	Alma mater
Dan McDonnell	Head coach	14	The Citadel (1992)
Roger Williams	Associate head coach/Pitching	14	East Carolina (1997)
Eric Snider	Assistant Coach/recruiting coordinator	6	Northern Iowa (1987)
Adam Vrable	Assistant Coach	6	Coastal Carolina (2007)
Brian Mundorf	Director of Operations	25	American International (1992)
