= Tommy Mace =

American baseball player (born 1998)

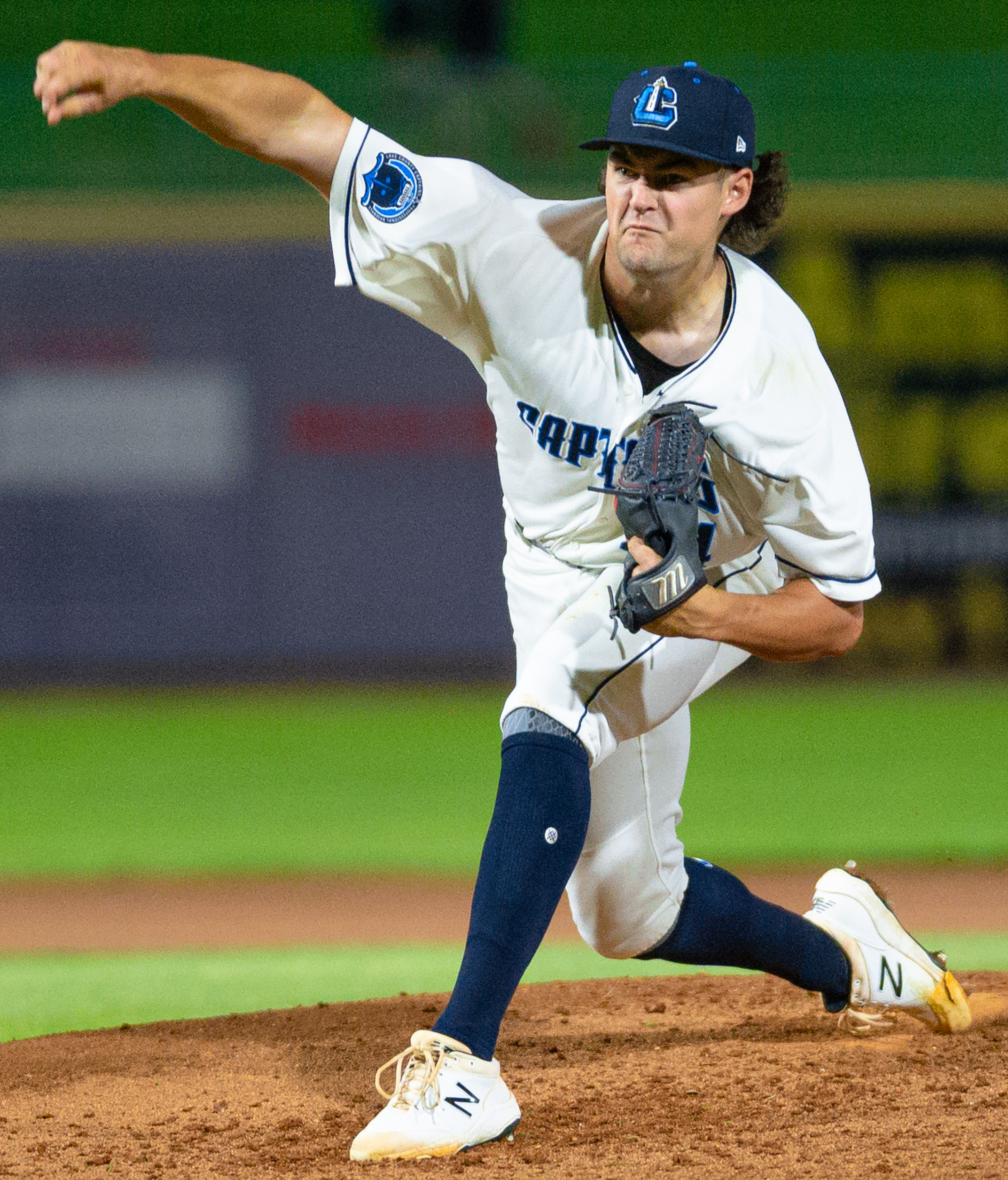
- Mace with the Lake County Captains in 2022

Free agent
- Pitcher
- Born: November 11, 1998 (age 27); Tampa, Florida, U.S.
- Bats: Right Throws: Right

Frank Thomas Mace III (born November 11, 1998) is an American professional baseball pitcher who is a free agent. He played college baseball for the Florida Gators and was selected by the Cleveland Indians in the second round of the 2021 MLB draft.

== Amateur career ==
Mace attended Sunlake High School in Land o' Lakes, Florida. As a junior in 2016, he pitched to a 1.14 ERA with 64 strikeouts over 49 innings. In 2017, his senior year, he went 8–2 with a 1.29 ERA and ninety strikeouts. He was named the North Suncoast Pitcher of the Year by the Tampa Bay Times. He was selected by the Cincinnati Reds in the 12th round of the 2017 Major League Baseball draft, but did not sign and instead enrolled at the University of Florida.

In 2018, Mace's freshman year at Florida, he appeared in 26 games (making six starts) in which he went 5–0 with a 4.16 ERA over 62 2/3 innings. He played in the Cape Cod Baseball League that summer with the Yarmouth–Dennis Red Sox. As a sophomore in 2019, he made a team-high 16 starts, going 8–5 with a 5.32 ERA. That summer, he attended the USA Baseball Collegiate National Team Training Camp in Cary, North Carolina, but was not named to the 26-man roster. As a junior, he pitched to a 1.67 ERA over 27 innings before the college baseball season was cancelled due to the COVID-19 pandemic. He was considered a top prospect and was expected to be selected in the 2020 Major League Baseball draft, but was not drafted due to signability concerns, and thus returned to Florida to play in 2021. In 2021, Mace appeared in 16 games (15 starts) in which he pitched to a 6-2 record and a 4.38 ERA over 90 1/3 innings.

== Professional career ==
Mace was selected by the Cleveland Indians in the second round with the 69th overall selection of the 2021 Major League Baseball draft. He signed for $1.1 million. He was assigned to the Lake County Captains of the High-A Midwest League for the 2022 season. In mid-May, he was placed on the injured list with a calf injury, and was activated in early June. Over 22 games (21 starts), Mace went 1-5 with a 4.55 ERA, 75 strikeouts, and 38 walks over 85 innings.

Mace returned to Lake County to open the 2023 season and was promoted to the Akron RubberDucks of the Double-A Eastern League in mid-June. Over 24 games (17 starts), he went 6-6 with a 4.63 ERA and 103 strikeouts over 114 2/3 innings. Mace was assigned to Akron for the 2024 season. Over 28 games (27 starts), Mace went 8-7 with a 3.71 ERA and 104 strikeouts over 145 2/3 innings. He returned to Akron to open the 2025 season. In August, he was promoted to the Columbus Clippers. Mace appeared in 30 games (20 starts) between both teams and pitched to an 11-6 record, 3.73 ERA, 86 strikeouts and 75 walks over 115 2/3 innings. Mace returned to Columbus to open the 2026 season. He had a 5.80 ERA across 25 relief appearances before he was released by Cleveland on July 12, 2026.
