= List of Tulane Green Wave baseball seasons =

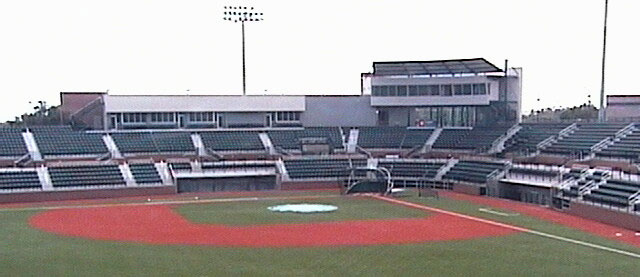
Greer Field at Turchin Stadium

This is a list of Tulane Green Wave baseball seasons. The Tulane Green Wave baseball team has represented Tulane University since 1893 and competes in the National Collegiate Athletic Association (NCAA) and the American Athletic Conference (The American). They were previously members of the Southern Intercollegiate Athletic Association (SIAA), Southern Conference (SoCon), Southeastern Conference (SEC), Metro Conference (Metro) and Conference USA (C-USA).

Tulane has appeared in two College World Series.

== Season results ==
National champions	College World Series berth	NCAA tournament berth	Conference Tournament champions	Conference Regular season Champion

Season	Head coach	Conference (Note: Tulane was a member of the Southern Intercollegiate Athletic Association from 1896 until 1921, but the conference did not sponsor baseball. The Southern Conference, of which Tulane was a member from 1922 until 1932, did not sponsor baseball until 1947.) (Note: Conference affiliations: Independent (1893–1896), Southern Intercollegiate Athletic Association (1897–1921), Southern Conference (1922–1932), Southeastern Conference (1933–1966), Independent (1967–1974), Metro Conference (1975–1985), Independent (1986–1989), Metro Conference (1990–1995), Conference USA (1996–2014), American Athletic Conference (2015–present))	Season results									Tournament results		Final poll (Note: Collegiate Baseball began team rankings in 1959. Baseball America began during the 1981 season.)	
Season	Head coach	Conference	Overall				Conference/Division					Conference (Note: The Southeastern Conference began a baseball tournament in 1977. The Metro Conference began a baseball tournament in 1976. Conference USA began a baseball tournament in 1996. The American Athletic Conference baseball began a baseball tournament in 2014.)	Postseason (Note: Postseason play involving the NCAA Division I Baseball Championship began in 1947.)	BA	CB
Season	Head coach	Conference	Wins	Losses	Ties	%	Wins	Losses	Ties	%	Finish	Conference	Postseason	BA	CB
Tulane Green Wave
1893	J.P. Clinton	Independent	1	1	0	.500	—	—	—	—	—	—	—	—	—
1894	J.P. Clinton	Independent	3	0	0	1.000	—	—	—	—	—	—	—	—	—
1895	No Team														
1896	No Team														
1897	F.B. Manis	Southern Intercollegiate Athletic Association	0	4	0	.000	—	—	—	—	—	—	—	—	—
1898	F.B. Manis	Southern Intercollegiate Athletic Association	7	2	0	.778	—	—	—	—	—	—	—	—	—
1899	Unknown	Southern Intercollegiate Athletic Association	5	3	2	.600	—	—	—	—	—	—	—	—	—
1900	Unknown	Southern Intercollegiate Athletic Association	7	4	0	.636	—	—	—	—	—	—	—	—	—
1901	Unknown	Southern Intercollegiate Athletic Association	7	8	0	.467	—	—	—	—	—	—	—	—	—
1902	Unknown	Southern Intercollegiate Athletic Association	8	5	0	.615	—	—	—	—	—	—	—	—	—
1903	Thomas Willis	Southern Intercollegiate Athletic Association	7	2	0	.778	—	—	—	—	—	—	—	—	—
1904	Thomas Willis	Southern Intercollegiate Athletic Association	6	7	0	.462	—	—	—	—	—	—	—	—	—
1905	Thomas Willis	Southern Intercollegiate Athletic Association	7	7	0	.500	—	—	—	—	—	—	—	—	—
1906	J. Richard	Southern Intercollegiate Athletic Association	14	18	2	.441	—	—	—	—	—	—	—	—	—
1907	J. Richard	Southern Intercollegiate Athletic Association	6	3	1	.650	—	—	—	—	—	—	—	—	—
1908	No Team														
1909	No Team														
1910	Unknown	Southern Intercollegiate Athletic Association	3	6	1	.350	—	—	—	—	—	—	—	—	—
1911	Bruce Hays	Southern Intercollegiate Athletic Association	3	3	0	.500	—	—	—	—	—	—	—	—	—
1912	Bruce Hays	Southern Intercollegiate Athletic Association	3	6	1	.350	—	—	—	—	—	—	—	—	—
1913	Bruce Hays	Southern Intercollegiate Athletic Association	3	9	0	.250	—	—	—	—	—	—	—	—	—
1914	Bruce Hays	Southern Intercollegiate Athletic Association	5	5	1	.500	—	—	—	—	—	—	—	—	—
1915	Bruce Hays	Southern Intercollegiate Athletic Association	6	10	0	.375	—	—	—	—	—	—	—	—	—
1916	Unknown	Southern Intercollegiate Athletic Association	1	4	0	.200	—	—	—	—	—	—	—	—	—
1917	No Team														
1918	No Team														
1919	John Gondolfi	Southern Intercollegiate Athletic Association		6	3	0	.667	—	—	—	—	—	—	—	—
1920	No Team														
1921	No Team														
1922	No Team														
1923	Bruce Hays	Southern Conference	2	8	1	.227	—	—	—	—	—	—	—	—	—
1924	Claude Simons, Sr.	Southern Conference	9	4	0	.692	—	—	—	—	—	—	—	—	—
1925	Claude Simons, Sr.	Southern Conference	5	7	0	.417	—	—	—	—	—	—	—	—	—
1926	Claude Simons, Sr.	Southern Conference	4	6	0	.400	—	—	—	—	—	—	—	—	—
1927	Claude Simons, Sr.	Southern Conference	0	9	0	.000	—	—	—	—	—	—	—	—	—
1928	Peggy Flournoy	Southern Conference	3	6	0	.333	—	—	—	—	—	—	—	—	—
1929		Southern Conference	4	4	1	.500	—	—	—	—	—	—	—	—	—
1930	Ted Bank	Southern Conference	0	14	0	.000	—	—	—	—	—	—	—	—	—
1931	No Team														
1932	Ted Bank	Southern Conference	0	3	0	.000	—	—	—	—	—	—	—	—	—
1933	No Team														
1934	No Team														
1935	No Team														
1936	No Team														
1937	Bill Vegan	Southeastern Conference	0	4	0	.000	0	4	0	.000		—	—	—	—
1938	Claude Simons, Jr.	Southeastern Conference	3	3	0	.500	1	1	0	.500		—	—	—	—
1939	Claude Simons, Jr.	Southeastern Conference	2	4	0	.333	0	3	0	.000		—	—	—	—
1940	Claude Simons, Jr.	Southeastern Conference	1	7	0	.125	1	3	0	.250		—	—	—	—
1941	Claude Simons, Jr.	Southeastern Conference	3	9	0	.250	2	6	0	.250		—	—	—	—
1942	Bobby Kellog	Southeastern Conference	2	9	0	.182	2	6	0	.250		—	—	—	—
1943	Claude Simons, Jr.	Southeastern Conference	9	8	0	.529	5	3	0	.625		—	—	—	—
1944	Claude Simons, Jr.	Southeastern Conference	5	6	0	.455	—	—	—	—	—	—	—	—	—
1945	Claude Simons, Jr.	Southeastern Conference	21	5	0	.808	—	—	—	—	—	—	—	—	—
1946	Claude Simons, Jr.	Southeastern Conference	6	13	0	.316	0	6	0	.000		—	—	—	—
1947	Claude Simons, Jr.	Southeastern Conference	17	3	0	.850	3	2	0	.600		—	—	—	—
1948	Claude Simons, Jr.	Southeastern Conference	18	4	0	.818	7	1	0	.875	1st	—	—	—	—
1949	Claude Simons, Jr.	Southeastern Conference	14	8	0	.636	5	5	0	.500		—	—	—	—
1950	John Reed	Southeastern Conference	4	9	1	.321	1	4	1	.250		—	—	—	—
1951	John Reed	Southeastern Conference	8	13	0	.381	7	9	0	.438		—	—	—	—
1952	Dennis Vizant	Southeastern Conference	14	5	1	.725	11	4	1	.719		—	—	—	—
1953	Dennis Vizant	Southeastern Conference	11	9	0	.550	8	7	0	.533		—	—	—	—
1954	Dennis Vizant	Southeastern Conference	12	8	0	.600	10	6	0	.625		—	—	—	—
1955	Ben Abadie	Southeastern Conference	4	12	0	.250	3	11	0	.214		—	—	—	—
1956	Ben Abadie	Southeastern Conference	11	11	0	.500	7	9	0	.438		—	—	—	—
1957	Ben Abadie	Southeastern Conference	11	9	0	.550	6	8	0	.429		—	—	—	—
1958	Mel Parnell	Southeastern Conference	4	18	0	.182	2	13	0	.133		—	—	—	—
1959	Bob Whitman	Southeastern Conference	6	9	0	.400	5	8	0	.385		—	—	—	
1960	Jack Orsley	Southeastern Conference	2	14	0	.125	1	11	0	.083		—	—	—	
1961	Jack Orsley	Southeastern Conference	4	14	0	.222	2	12	0	.143		—	—	—	
1962	Doug Hafner	Southeastern Conference	4	17	1	.205	2	12	1	.167		—	—	—	
1963	Doug Hafner	Southeastern Conference	6	18	1	.260	4	12	0	.250		—	—	—	
1964	Ben Abadie	Southeastern Conference	12	13	1	.481	4	10	0	.286		—	—	—	
1965	Ben Abadie	Southeastern Conference	15	10	0	.600	9	6	0	.600		—	—	—	
1966	Ben Abadie	Southeastern Conference	17	7	0	.708	4	7	0	.364		—	—	—	
1967	Milt Retif	Independent	8	12	0	.400	—	—	—	—	—	—	—	—	
1968	Milt Retif	Independent	10	10	0	.500	—	—	—	—	—	—	—	—	
1969	Milt Retif	Independent	15	3	0	.833	—	—	—	—	—	—	—	20	
1970	Milt Retif	Independent	15	7	0	.682	—	—	—	—	—	—	—	—	
1971	Milt Retif	Independent	16	10	0	.615	—	—	—	—	—	—	—	—	
1972	Milt Retif	Independent	23	6	0	.793	—	—	—	—	—	—	—	23	
1973	Milt Retif	Independent	15	13	0	.536	—	—	—	—	—	—	—	—	
1974	Milt Retif	Independent	21	12	0	.636	—	—	—	—	—	—	—	—	
1975	Joe Brockhoff	Metro Conference	24	11	1	.681	0	0	0	–		—	—	—	
1976	Joe Brockhoff	Metro Conference	24	14	1	.628	0	0	0	–			—	—	
1977	Joe Brockhoff	Metro Conference	32	10	0	.762	0	0	0	–			—	—	
1978	Joe Brockhoff	Metro Conference	25	18	0	.581	9	2	0	.818			—	—	
1979	Joe Brockhoff	Metro Conference	35	13	0	.729	0	4	0	.000		1st	South Regional	20	
1980	Joe Brockhoff	Metro Conference	29	19	0	.604	1	0	0	1.000			—	—	
1981	Joe Brockhoff	Metro Conference	37	26	0	.587	2	4	0	.333			—		
1982	Joe Brockhoff	Metro Conference	41	16	0	.719	2	5	0	.286		1st	South Regional	20	
1983	Joe Brockhoff	Metro Conference	45	17	0	.726	6	3	0	.667	1st		Central Regional	23	18
1984	Joe Brockhoff	Metro Conference	42	16	0	.724	7	3	0	.700			—		
1985	Joe Brockhoff	Metro Conference	38	22	0	.633	6	10	0	.375			—		
1986	Joe Brockhoff	Independent	49	15	0	.766	—	—	—	—	—	—	South I Regional	12	13
1987	Joe Brockhoff	Independent	44	18	0	.710	—	—	—	—	—	—	South II Regional		
1988	Joe Brockhoff	Independent	32	18	0	.640	—	—	—	—	—	—	East Regional	28	
1989	Joe Brockhoff	Independent	27	26	0	.509	—	—	—	—	—	—	—		
1990	Joe Brockhoff	Metro Conference	19	35	0	.352	4	16	0	.200			—		
1991	Joe Brockhoff	Metro Conference	36	18	0	.667	12	8	0	.600			—		
1992	Joe Brockhoff	Metro Conference	39	24	0	.619	9	9	0	.500		1st	South Regional		
1993	Joe Brockhoff	Metro Conference	23	31	0	.426	8	7	0	.533			—		
1994	Rick Jones	Metro Conference	41	24	0	.631	8	7	0	.533			South Regional		
1995	Rick Jones	Metro Conference	32	26	0	.552	8	10	0	.444			—		
1996	Rick Jones	Conference USA	43	20	0	.683	18	6	0	.750		1st	South II Regional	24	20
1997	Rick Jones	Conference USA	40	21	0	.656	19	7	0	.731	1st		—		
1998	Rick Jones	Conference USA	48	15	0	.762	22	5	0	.815	1st	1st	South II Regional	25	20
1999	Rick Jones	Conference USA	48	15	0	.762	19	8	0	.704		1st	Auburn Regional	21	15
2000	Rick Jones	Conference USA	38	22	1	.631	20	6	1	.759			Starkville Regional		
2001	Rick Jones	Conference USA	56	13	0	.812	21	6	0	.778	1st	1st	College World Series	6	5
2002	Rick Jones	Conference USA	36	27	0	.571	17	13	0	.567			Baton Rouge Regional		
2003	Rick Jones	Conference USA	44	19	0	.698	20	10	0	.667			Baton Rouge Regional		
2004	Rick Jones	Conference USA	41	21	0	.661	21	9	0	.700			Fullerton Super Regional	15	19
2005	Rick Jones	Conference USA	56	12	0	.824	24	6	0	.800	1st	1st	College World Series	5	3
2006	Rick Jones	Conference USA	43	21	0	.672	15	9	0	.625			Oxford Regional	27	
2007	Rick Jones	Conference USA	34	26	0	.567	9	15	0	.375			—		
2008	Rick Jones	Conference USA	39	22	1	.637	13	9	1	.587			Tallahassee Regional		
2009	Rick Jones	Conference USA	34	25	0	.576	13	11	0	.542			—		
2010	Rick Jones	Conference USA	32	24	0	.571	10	14	0	.417			—		
2011	Rick Jones	Conference USA	31	26	0	.544	10	14	0	.417			—		
2012	Rick Jones	Conference USA	37	20	0	.649	14	10	0	.583			—		
2013	Rick Jones	Conference USA	30	28	0	.517	11	13	0	.458			—		
2014	Rick Jones	Conference USA	23	29	0	.442	10	18	0	.357			—		
2015	David Pierce	American Athletic Conference	35	25	0	.583	13	11	0	.542			Baton Rouge Regional		
2016	David Pierce	American Athletic Conference	41	21	0	.661	15	7	0	.682	1st		Oxford Regional	25	19
2017	Travis Jewett	American Athletic Conference	27	31	0	.466	13	11	0	.542			—		
2018	Travis Jewett	American Athletic Conference	25	33	0	.431	9	14	0	.391			—		
2019	Travis Jewett	American Athletic Conference	32	26	0	.552	12	11	0	.522			—		
2020	Travis Jewett	American Athletic Conference	15	2	0	.882	0	0	0	–					
2021	Travis Jewett	American Athletic Conference	31	24	0	.564	17	10	0	.630					
2022	Travis Jewett	American Athletic Conference	33	26	1	.558	11	13	0	.458					
2023	Jay Uhlman	American Athletic Conference	19	42	0	.311	8	16	0	.333		1st	Baton Rouge Regional		
2024	Jay Uhlman	American Athletic Conference	36	26	0	.581	15	12	0	.556		1st	Corvallis Regional		
2025	Jay Uhlman	American Athletic Conference	33	25	0	.569	13	14	0	.481	T–5th	2nd	—		
Total:			2298	1582	20	.592									

=== Notes ===
Sources:
