= 2020 UConn Huskies baseball team =

American college baseball season

2020 UConn Huskies baseball
- Conference: American Athletic Conference
- Record: 8–5 (0–0 The American)
- Head coach: Jim Penders (17th season)
- Assistant coaches: Jeff Hourigan (9th season); Joshua McDonald (9th season); Chris Podeszwa (17th season)
- Home stadium: Elliot Ballpark

2020 American Athletic Conference baseball standings
| | Conf. | | | | Overall |
| Team | W | | L | PCT | W | | L | PCT |
|---|---|---|---|---|---|---|---|---|
| No. 20 Tulane ‍‍‍ | 0 | – | 0 | – | 15 | – | 2 | .882 |
| Wichita State ‍‍‍ | 0 | – | 0 | – | 13 | – | 2 | .867 |
| No. 12 UCF ‍‍‍ | 0 | – | 0 | – | 15 | – | 3 | .833 |
| East Carolina ‍‍‍ | 0 | – | 0 | – | 13 | – | 4 | .765 |
| UConn ‍‍‍ | 0 | – | 0 | – | 8 | – | 5 | .615 |
| Memphis ‍‍‍ | 0 | – | 0 | – | 10 | – | 7 | .588 |
| Cincinnati ‍‍‍ | 0 | – | 0 | – | 7 | – | 8 | .467 |
| Houston ‍‍‍ | 0 | – | 0 | – | 6 | – | 9 | .400 |
| South Florida ‍‍‍ | 0 | – | 0 | – | 6 | – | 11 | .353 |
‡ – Tournament champion As of March 12, 2020; Rankings from D1Baseball

The 2020 UConn Huskies baseball team represented the University of Connecticut in the 2020 NCAA Division I baseball season. The Huskies play their home games at Elliot Ballpark, their brand new stadium on campus in Storrs, Connecticut. The team was coached by Jim Penders, in his 17th season at UConn.

On March 12, 2020, the season was canceled due to the coronavirus pandemic.

== Previous season ==
The Huskies posted an overall record of 39–25 in 2019, finishing 4th in the American with a 12–12 record. They reached the 2019 American Athletic Conference baseball tournament final, where they fell to Cincinnati. In the NCAA Oklahoma City Regional, the Huskies also advanced to the final, forcing a decisive game, before falling to host Oklahoma State.

== Personnel ==
=== Roster ===
2020 Connecticut Huskies roster
| Pitchers: 10 - Colby Dunlop - Junior; 18 - Josh Cohen - Freshman; 21 - Reggie Crawford - Freshman; 23 - Sam Favieri - Freshman; 24 - Caleb Wurster - (redshirt) Sophomore; 25 - Joe Simeone - Junior; 26 - Tim Pfaffenbichler - (redshirt) Freshman; 31 - Jimmy Wang - (redshirt) Sophomore; 32 - Nick Krauth - Junior; 34 - Randy Polonia - (redshirt) Senior; 36 - Justin Willis - Junior; 38 - Ben Casparius - Junior; 39 - Leif Bigelow - (redshirt) Freshman; 40 - Angus Mayock - (redshirt) Sophomore; 42 - Pat Gallagher - Freshman; 44 - Max Nielsen - Freshman; 45 - Kenneth Haus - Senior; 46 - Andrew Marrero - Freshman; 47 - Erik Stock - Junior; - Garrett Coe - Freshman | Catchers: 2 - Cole Brodnansky - Senior; 9 - Paul Gozzo - (redshirt) Junior; 43 - Pat Winkel - Sophomore; Outfielders: 3 - Kyler Fedko - Sophomore; 4 - Michael Chiovitti - Senior; 12 - Kevin Ferrer - (redshirt) Freshman; 13 - Anthony Nucerino - (redshirt) Junior; 22 - Ben Maycock - (redshirt) Junior | Infielders: 1 - Tyler Griggs - Freshman; 5 - Matt Bonvicini - (redshirt) Sophomore; 6 - Andy Hague - (redshirt) Sophomore; 7 - Christian Fedko - Junior; 8 - Zach Bushling - Junior; 11 - Chris Winkel - Senior; 19 - Will Lucas - Sophomore; 20 - Conor Moriarty - Senior; 27 - Todd Petersen - Freshman; 30 - Chris Brown - Freshman; 37 - Zach Donahue - Freshman; 41 - David Langer - Senior |

=== Coaches ===
2020 Connecticut Huskies baseball coaching staff
- 16 – Jim Penders – Head coach – 17th season
- 29 – Jeff Hourigan – Assistant coach/recruiting coordinator – 9th season
- 33 – Joshua MacDonald – Assistant coach – 9th season
- 14 – Chris Podeszwa – Volunteer assistant coach – 17th season

== Schedule ==
Legend
| | UConn win |
| | UConn loss |
| | Cancellation |
| **Bold** | UConn team member |
| * | Non-Conference game |

2020 Connecticut Huskies baseball game log
Regular season

February
| Date | Opponent | Rank | Site/stadium | Score | Win | Loss | Save | Attendance | Overall record | AAC record |
|---|---|---|---|---|---|---|---|---|---|---|
| Feb 14 | vs Cal Poly* | | Salt River Fields at Talking Stick • Scottsdale, AZ (MLB4 Tournament) | **L** 0–5 | Dollard (1–0) | **Simeone (0–1)** | Villalobos (1) | 531 | 0–1 | |
| Feb 15 | vs No. 2 Vanderbilt* | | Salt River Fields at Talking Stick • Scottsdale, AZ (MLB4 Tournament) | **L** 1–6 | Rocker (1–0) | **Stock (0–1)** | Hliboki (1) | 612 | 0–2 | |
| Feb 16 | vs No. 13 Michigan* | | Salt River Fields at Talking Stick • Scottsdale, AZ (MLB4 Tournament) | **W** 7–1 | **Krauth (1–0)** | Paige (0–1) | None | 502 | 1–2 | |
| Feb 21 | vs No. 9 Michigan* | | First Data Field • Port St. Lucie, FL | **W** 8–7 | **Haus (1–0)** | Keizer (1–1) | **Wurster (1)** | 250 | 2–2 | |
| Feb 22 | vs No. 9 Michigan* | | First Data Field • Port St. Lucie, FL | **L** 2–14 | Hajjar (2–0) | **Dunlop (0–1)** | Denner (1) | 440 | 2–3 | |
| Feb 23 | vs No. 9 Michigan* | | First Data Field • Port St. Lucie, FL | **W** 9–2 | **Krauth (2–0)** | Beers (1–1) | None | 475 | 3–3 | |
| Feb 28 | at New Orleans* | | Maestri Field at Privateer Park • New Orleans, LA | **L** 3–8 | Turpin (1–0) | **Lucas (0–1)** | None | 228 | 3–4 | |
| Feb 29 | at New Orleans* | | Maestri Field at Privateer Park • New Orleans, LA | **L** 8–17 | Orze (2–0) | **Dunlop (0–2)** | None | 498 | 3–5 | |

March
| Date | Opponent | Rank | Site/stadium | Score | Win | Loss | Save | Attendance | Overall record | AAC record |
|---|---|---|---|---|---|---|---|---|---|---|
| Mar 1 | at New Orleans* | | Maestri Field at Privateer Park • New Orleans, LA | **W** 9–2 | **Krauth (3–0)** | Holstein (0–2) | None | 313 | 4–5 | |
| Mar 6 | at Presbyterian* | | Presbyterian Baseball Complex • Clinton, SC | **W** 20–1 | **Krauth (4–0)** | Miles (1–1) | None | | 5–5 | |
| Mar 7 | at Presbyterian* | | Presbyterian Baseball Complex • Clinton, SC | **W** 7–1 | **Simeone (1–1)** | Fowler (1–1) | **Gallagher (1)** | 115 | 6–5 | |
| Mar 8 | at Presbyterian* | | Presbyterian Baseball Complex • Clinton, SC | **W** 4–3 | **Wurster (1–0)** | Paradis (1–2) | None | 75 | 7–5 | |
| Mar 10 | at Hartford* | | Fiondella Field • Hartford, CT | **W** 5–2 | **Lucas (1–1)** | Myers (1–1) | **Wurster (2)** | 210 | 8–5 | |
| Mar 13 | vs Monmouth* | | Malcolm U. Pitt Field • Richmond, VA | Cancelled | | | | | | |
| Mar 14 | vs Harvard* | | Malcolm U. Pitt Field • Richmond, VA | Cancelled | | | | | | |
| Mar 15 | at Richmond* | | Malcolm U. Pitt Field • Richmond, VA | Cancelled | | | | | | |
| Mar 16 | vs Iona* | | Malcolm U. Pitt Field • Richmond, VA | Cancelled | | | | | | |
| Mar 17 | vs Harvard* | | Malcolm U. Pitt Field • Richmond, VA | Cancelled | | | | | | |
| Mar 20 | at Cincinnati | | Marge Schott Stadium • Cincinnati, OH | Cancelled | | | | | | |
| Mar 21 | at Cincinnati | | Marge Schott Stadium • Cincinnati, OH | Cancelled | | | | | | |
| Mar 22 | at Cincinnati | | Marge Schott Stadium • Cincinnati, OH | | Cancelled | | | | | |
| Mar 24 | at Boston College* | | Eddie Pellagrini Diamond • Brighton, MA | Cancelled | | | | | | |
| Mar 27 | at Seton Hall* | | Owen T. Carroll Field • South Orange, NJ | Cancelled | | | | | | |
| Mar 28 | at Seton Hall* | | Owen T. Carroll Field • South Orange, NJ | Cancelled | | | | | | |
| Mar 29 | Seton Hall* | | Elliot Ballpark • Storrs, CT | Cancelled | | | | | | |
| Mar 31 | at Fairfield* | | Alumni Baseball Diamond • Fairfield, CT | Cancelled | | | | | | |

April
| Date | Opponent | Rank | Site/stadium | Score | Win | Loss | Save | Attendance | Overall record | AAC record |
|---|---|---|---|---|---|---|---|---|---|---|
| Apr 1 | Stony Brook* | | Elliot Ballpark • Storrs, CT | Cancelled | | | | | | |
| Apr 3 | at South Florida | | USF Baseball Stadium • Tampa, FL | Cancelled | | | | | | |
| Apr 4 | at South Florida | | USF Baseball Stadium • Tampa, FL | Cancelled | | | | | | |
| Apr 5 | at South Florida | | USF Baseball Stadium • Tampa, FL | Cancelled | | | | | | |
| Apr 7 | Bryant* | | Elliot Ballpark • Storrs, CT | Cancelled | | | | | | |
| Apr 9 | UCF | | Elliot Ballpark • Storrs, CT | Cancelled | | | | | | |
| Apr 10 | UCF | | Elliot Ballpark • Storrs, CT | Cancelled | | | | | | |
| Apr 11 | UCF | | Elliot Ballpark • Storrs, CT | Cancelled | | | | | | |
| Apr 14 | UMass | | Elliot Ballpark • Storrs, CT | Cancelled | | | | | | |
| Apr 15 | at Northeastern* | | Parsons Field • Brookline, MA | Cancelled | | | | | | |
| Apr 17 | East Carolina | | Elliot Ballpark • Storrs, CT | Cancelled | | | | | | |
| Apr 18 | East Carolina | | Elliot Ballpark • Storrs, CT | Cancelled | | | | | | |
| Apr 19 | East Carolina | | Elliot Ballpark • Storrs, CT | Cancelled | | | | | | |
| Apr 21 | Rhode Island* | | Elliot Ballpark • Storrs, CT | Cancelled | | | | | | |
| Apr 22 | at Army* | | Johnson Stadium at Doubleday Field • West Point, NY | Cancelled | | | | | | |
| Apr 24 | at Memphis | | FedExPark • Memphis, TN | Cancelled | | | | | | |
| Apr 25 | at Memphis | | FedExPark • Memphis, TN | Cancelled | | | | | | |
| Apr 26 | at Memphis | | FedExPark • Memphis, TN | Cancelled | | | | | | |
| Apr 28 | at Central Connecticut* | | Balf–Savin Field • New Britain, CT | Cancelled | | | | | | |
| Apr 29 | Army* | | Elliot Ballpark • Storrs, CT | Cancelled | | | | | | |

May
| Date | Opponent | Rank | Site/stadium | Score | Win | Loss | Save | Attendance | Overall record | AAC record |
|---|---|---|---|---|---|---|---|---|---|---|
| May 1 | Houston | | Dunkin' Donuts Park • Hartford, CT | Cancelled | | | | | | |
| May 2 | Houston | | Elliot Ballpark • Storrs, CT | Cancelled | | | | | | |
| May 3 | Houston | | Elliot Ballpark • Storrs, CT | Cancelled | | | | | | |
| May 8 | at Wichita State | | Eck Stadium • Wichita, KS | Cancelled | | | | | | |
| May 9 | at Wichita State | | Eck Stadium • Wichita, KS | Cancelled | | | | | | |
| May 10 | at Wichita State | | Eck Stadium • Wichita, KS | Cancelled | | | | | | |
| May 12 | at Rhode Island* | | Bill Beck Field • Kingston, RI | Cancelled | | | | | | |
| May 14 | Tulane | | Dunkin' Donuts Park • Hartford, CT | Cancelled | | | | | | |
| May 15 | Tulane | | Elliot Ballpark • Storrs, CT | Cancelled | | | | | | |
| May 16 | Tulane | | Elliot Ballpark • Storrs, CT | Cancelled | | | | | | |

Postseason

AAC Tournament
| Date | Opponent | Rank | Site/stadium | Score | Win | Loss | Save | Attendance | Overall record | AACT Record |
|---|---|---|---|---|---|---|---|---|---|---|
| May 19 | TBD | | Spectrum Field • Clearwater, FL | Cancelled | | | | | | |
| May 20 | TBD | | Spectrum Field • Clearwater, FL | Cancelled | | | | | | |

Rankings from D1Baseball. Parentheses indicate tournament seedings.
