= 2020 New Orleans Privateers baseball team =

University baseball team

2020 New Orleans Privateers baseball
- Conference: Southland Conference
- Record: 11–6 (2–1 SLC)
- Head coach: Blake Dean (5th season)
- Hitting coach: Brett Stewart (5th season)
- Pitching coach: A.J. Battisto (2nd season)
- Home stadium: Maestri Field at Privateer Park

2020 Southland Conference baseball standings
| | Conf. | | | | Overall |
| Team | W | | L | PCT | W | | L | PCT |
|---|---|---|---|---|---|---|---|---|
| Stephen F. Austin ‍‍‍ | 3 | – | 0 | 1.000 | 6 | – | 10 | .375 |
| Northwestern State ‍‍‍ | 2 | – | 1 | .667 | 12 | – | 4 | .750 |
| New Orleans ‍‍‍ | 2 | – | 1 | .667 | 11 | – | 6 | .647 |
| Central Arkansas ‍‍‍ | 2 | – | 1 | .667 | 8 | – | 8 | .500 |
| Texas A&M–Corpus Christi ‍‍‍ | 2 | – | 1 | .667 | 8 | – | 10 | .444 |
| Houston Baptist ‍‍‍ | 2 | – | 1 | .667 | 6 | – | 11 | .353 |
| Incarnate Word ‍‍‍ | 1 | – | 2 | .333 | 9 | – | 7 | .563 |
| Nicholls ‍‍‍ | 1 | – | 2 | .333 | 10 | – | 8 | .556 |
| Sam Houston State ‍‍‍ | 1 | – | 2 | .333 | 7 | – | 7 | .500 |
| Abilene Christian ‍‍‍ | 1 | – | 2 | .333 | 7 | – | 8 | .467 |
| Southeastern Louisiana ‍‍‍ | 1 | – | 2 | .333 | 6 | – | 10 | .375 |
| McNeese State ‍‍‍ | 0 | – | 0 | – | 10 | – | 7 | .588 |
| Lamar ‍‍‍ | 0 | – | 3 | .000 | 7 | – | 10 | .412 |
‡ – Tournament champion Rankings from D1Baseball

The 2020 New Orleans Privateers baseball team represent the University of New Orleans (UNO) during the 2020 NCAA Division I baseball season. The Privateers play their home games at Maestri Field at Privateer Park as a member of the Southland Conference. They are led by head coach Blake Dean, in his 5th season at UNO.

== Preseason ==
=== SLC media poll ===
The SLC media poll was released on February 6, 2020 with the Privateers predicted to finish 9th, the position they finished the previous season.

Media poll
| Predicted finish | Team | Votes (1st place) |
| 1 | Sam Houston State | 276 (17) |
| 2 | Central Arkansas | 247 (5) |
| 3 | McNeese State | 244 (1) |
| 4 | Southeastern Louisiana | 243 (3) |
| 5 | Northwestern State | 193 |
| 6 | Texas A&M–Corpus Christi | 146 |
| 7 | Incarnate Word | 144 |
| 8 | Nicholls | 108 |
| 9 | New Orleans | 101 |
| 10 | Abilene Christian | 98 |
| 11 | Stephen F. Austin | 92 |
| 12 | Lamar | 87 |
| 13 | Houston Baptist | 49 |

=== Preseason All-SLC teams ===
Along with Abilene Christian, the Privateers were one of only two teams that did not have any players selected by the conference to be part of their all-conference teams.

== Personnel ==
=== Coaching staff ===
| Name | Position | Seasons at UNO | Alma mater |
|---|---|---|---|
| Blake Dean | Head coach | 5 | Louisiana State University (2013) |
| Brett Stewart | Assistant coach | 5 | Appalachian State University (2009) |
| A.J. Battisto | Assistant coach | 2 | Georgia Southern University (2007) |
| Ryan Brewer | Student Assistant Coach | 4 | University of New Orleans (2019) |
| Hezekiah Randolph | Volunteer Assistant | 1 | University of New Orleans (2017) |

== Schedule ==
Legend
| | UNO win |
| | UNO loss |
| | Postponement/Cancelation/Suspension |
| **Bold** | UNO team member |

2020 New Orleans Privateers Game Log
Regular season (10–6)

February (7–4)
| Date | Opponent | Rank | Site/stadium | Score | Win | Loss | Save | Attendance | Overall record | SLC record |
|---|---|---|---|---|---|---|---|---|---|---|
| February 14 | Southern | | Maestri Field • New Orleans, LA | 3–9 | Snyder | **Kulivan** (0–1) | None | 339 | 0–1 | – |
| February 15 | Grambling State | | Wesley Barrow • New Orleans, LA | 1–5 | Delgado | **Holstein** (0–1) | None | 327 | 0–2 | – |
| February 16 | Prairie View A&M | | Maestri Field • New Orleans, LA | 10–2 | **Mitchell** (1–0) | Warren | None | 213 | 1–2 | – |
| February 18 | Southern Miss | | Pete Taylor Park • Hattiesburg, MS | 5–6 | Stanley | **Kulivan** (0–2) | None | 3,314 | 1–3 | – |
| February 21 | Arkansas State | | Tomlinson Stadium • Jonesboro, AR | 5–4 | **DeMayo** (1–0) | Stone | **Kulivan** (1) | 243 | 2–3 | – |
| February 22 | Arkansas State | | Tomlinson Stadium • Jonesboro, AR | 11–0 | **Orze** (1–0) | Jackson | None | 327 | 3–3 | – |
| February 23 | Arkansas State | | Tomlinson Stadium • Jonesboro, AR | 2–1 | **Kulivan** (1–2) | Jumper | **Lamkin** (1) | 124 | 4–3 | – |
| February 25 | South Alabama | | Eddie Stanky Field • Mobile, AL | 0–5 | Boswell | **DeMayo** (1–1) | None | 1,006 | 4–4 | – |
| February 26 | Tulane | | Turchin Stadium • New Orleans, LA | 10–0 | **Mitchell** (2–0) | Holcomb | None | 1,486 | 5–4 | – |
| February 28 | UConn | | Maestri Field • New Orleans, LA | 8–3 | **Turpin** (1–0) | Lucas | None | 228 | 6–4 | – |
| February 29 | UConn | | Maestri Field • New Orleans, LA | 17–8 | **Orze** (2–0) | Dunlop | None | 498 | 7–4 | – |

March (4–2)
| Date | Opponent | Rank | Site/stadium | Score | Win | Loss | Save | Attendance | Overall record | SLC record |
|---|---|---|---|---|---|---|---|---|---|---|
| March 1 | UConn | | Maestri Field • New Orleans, LA | 2–9 | Krauth | **Holstein** (0–2) | None | 313 | 7–5 | – |
| March 3 | Alcorn State | | Maestri Field • New Orleans, LA | 11–0 | **Poche** (1–0) | Osborne III | None | 152 | 8–5 | – |
| March 6 | Nicholls | | Maestri Field • New Orleans, LA | 3–4 | Kilcrease | **Turpin** (1–1) | Taylor | 282 | 8–6 | 0–1 |
| March 7 | Nicholls | | Maestri Field • New Orleans, LA | 5–2 | **Orze** (3–0) | Theriot | **Mitchell** (1) | 492 | 9–6 | 1–1 |
| March 8 | Nicholls | | Maestri Field • New Orleans, LA | 9–1 | **Kulivan** (2–2) | Heckman | **Khachadourian** (1) | 451 | 10–6 | 2–1 |
| March 11 | Southern | | Maestri Field • New Orleans, LA | 11–5 | **Poche** (2–0) | Haensel | None | 430 | 11–6 | – |
| March 13 | Northwestern State | | Maestri Field • New Orleans, LA | Game canceled by the SLC in response to the COVID-19 pandemic | | | | | | |
| March 14 | Northwestern State | | Maestri Field • New Orleans, LA | Game canceled by the SLC in response to the COVID-19 pandemic | | | | | | |
| March 15 | Northwestern State | | Maestri Field • New Orleans, LA | Game canceled by the SLC in response to the COVID-19 pandemic | | | | | | |
| March 17 | South Alabama | | Maestri Field • New Orleans, LA | Game canceled by the SLC in response to the COVID-19 pandemic | | | | | | |
| March 20 | Sam Houston State | | Don Sanders Stadium • Huntsville, TX | Game canceled by the SLC in response to the COVID-19 pandemic | | | | | | |
| March 21 | Sam Houston State | | Don Sanders Stadium • Huntsville, TX | Game canceled by the SLC in response to the COVID-19 pandemic | | | | | | |
| March 22 | Sam Houston State | | Don Sanders Stadium • Huntsville, TX | Game canceled by the SLC in response to the COVID-19 pandemic | | | | | | |
| March 25 | Jackson State | | Maestri Field • New Orleans, LA | Game canceled by the SLC in response to the COVID-19 pandemic | | | | | | |
| March 27 | Incarnate Word | | Maestri Field • New Orleans, LA | Game canceled by the SLC in response to the COVID-19 pandemic | | | | | | |
| March 28 | Incarnate Word | | Maestri Field • New Orleans, LA | Game canceled by the SLC in response to the COVID-19 pandemic | | | | | | |
| March 29 | Incarnate Word | | Maestri Field • New Orleans, LA | Game canceled by the SLC in response to the COVID-19 pandemic | | | | | | |

April (0–0)
| Date | Opponent | Rank | Site/stadium | Score | Win | Loss | Save | Attendance | Overall record | SLC record |
|---|---|---|---|---|---|---|---|---|---|---|
| April 1 | Alcorn State | | Maestri Field • New Orleans, LA | Game canceled by the SLC in response to the COVID-19 pandemic | | | | | | |
| April 3 | Southeastern LA | | Pat Kenelly Diamond • Hammond, LA | Game canceled by the SLC in response to the COVID-19 pandemic | | | | | | |
| April 4 | Southeastern LA | | Pat Kenelly Diamond • Hammond, LA | Game canceled by the SLC in response to the COVID-19 pandemic | | | | | | |
| April 5 | Southeastern LA | | Pat Kenelly Diamond • Hammond, LA | Game canceled by the SLC in response to the COVID-19 pandemic | | | | | | |
| April 7 | at Jackson State | | Braddy Field • Jackson, MS | Game canceled by the SLC in response to the COVID-19 pandemic | | | | | | |
| April 9 | McNeese State | | Maestri Field • New Orleans, LA | Game canceled by the SLC in response to the COVID-19 pandemic | | | | | | |
| April 10 | McNeese State | | Maestri Field • New Orleans, LA | Game canceled by the SLC in response to the COVID-19 pandemic | | | | | | |
| April 11 | McNeese State | | Maestri Field • New Orleans, LA | Game canceled by the SLC in response to the COVID-19 pandemic | | | | | | |
| April 14 | Southern | | Lee–Hines Field • Baton Rouge, LA | Game canceled by the SLC in response to the COVID-19 pandemic | | | | | | |
| April 15 | Tulane | | Maestri Field • New Orleans, LA | Game canceled by the SLC in response to the COVID-19 pandemic | | | | | | |
| April 17 | VCU | | Maestri Field • New Orleans, LA | Game canceled by the SLC in response to the COVID-19 pandemic | | | | | | |
| April 18 | VCU | | Maestri Field • New Orleans, LA | Game canceled by the SLC in response to the COVID-19 pandemic | | | | | | |
| April 19 | VCU | | Maestri Field • New Orleans, LA | Game canceled by the SLC in response to the COVID-19 pandemic | | | | | | |
| April 21 | Tulane | | Turchin Stadium • New Orleans, LA | Game canceled by the SLC in response to the COVID-19 pandemic | | | | | | |
| April 24 | Lamar | | Cardinal Field • Beaumont, TX | Game canceled by the SLC in response to the COVID-19 pandemic | | | | | | |
| April 25 | Lamar | | Cardinal Field • Beaumont, TX | Game canceled by the SLC in response to the COVID-19 pandemic | | | | | | |
| April 26 | Lamar | | Cardinal Field • Beaumont, TX | Game canceled by the SLC in response to the COVID-19 pandemic | | | | | | |
| April 28 | Southern Miss | | Maestri Field • New Orleans, LA | Game canceled by the SLC in response to the COVID-19 pandemic | | | | | | |

May (0–0)
| Date | Opponent | Rank | Site/stadium | Score | Win | Loss | Save | Attendance | Overall record | SLC record |
|---|---|---|---|---|---|---|---|---|---|---|
| May 1 | Houston Baptist | | Husky Field • Houston, TX | Game canceled by the SLC in response to the COVID-19 pandemic | | | | | | |
| May 2 | Houston Baptist | | Husky Field • Houston, TX | Game canceled by the SLC in response to the COVID-19 pandemic | | | | | | |
| May 3 | Houston Baptist | | Husky Field • Houston, TX | Game canceled by the SLC in response to the COVID-19 pandemic | | | | | | |
| May 8 | Stephen F. Austin | | Maestri Field • New Orleans, LA | Game canceled by the SLC in response to the COVID-19 pandemic | | | | | | |
| May 9 | Stephen F. Austin | | Maestri Field • New Orleans, LA | Game canceled by the SLC in response to the COVID-19 pandemic | | | | | | |
| May 10 | Stephen F. Austin | | Maestri Field • New Orleans, LA | Game canceled by the SLC in response to the COVID-19 pandemic | | | | | | |
| May 12 | LSU | | Alex Box Stadium • Baton Rouge, LA | Game canceled by the SLC in response to the COVID-19 pandemic | | | | | | |
| May 14 | Abilene Christian | | Crutcher Scott Field • Abilene, TX | Game canceled by the SLC in response to the COVID-19 pandemic | | | | | | |
| May 15 | Abilene Christian | | Crutcher Scott Field • Abilene, TX | Game canceled by the SLC in response to the COVID-19 pandemic | | | | | | |
| May 16 | Abilene Christian | | Crutcher Scott Field • Abilene, TX | Game canceled by the SLC in response to the COVID-19 pandemic | | | | | | |

All rankings from D1Baseball.
