= 2019 Tulane Green Wave baseball team =

American college baseball season

2019 Tulane Green Wave baseball
- Conference: American Athletic Conference
- Record: 32-26 (12-11 The American)
- Head coach: Travis Jewett (3rd season)
- Assistant coaches: Eddie Smith; Daniel Latham; Brian Harris
- Home stadium: Greer Field at Turchin Stadium

2019 American Athletic Conference baseball standings
	Conf.				Overall
Team	W		L	PCT	W		L	PCT
No. 13 East Carolina ‍†‍‍^{y}	20	–	4	.833	47	–	18	.723
Cincinnati ‍‍‡‍^{y}	13	–	11	.542	31	–	31	.500
Tulane ‍‍‍	12	–	11	.522	32	–	26	.552
UConn ‍‍‍^{y}	12	–	12	.500	39	–	25	.609
Houston ‍‍‍	12	–	12	.500	32	–	24	.571
UCF ‍‍‍	11	–	13	.458	36	–	22	.621
Memphis ‍‍‍	10	–	13	.435	27	–	28	.491
Wichita State ‍‍‍	9	–	15	.375	28	–	31	.475
South Florida ‍‍‍	8	–	16	.333	26	–	27	.491
† – Conference champion ‡ – Tournament champion y – Invited to the NCAA tournament As of July 16, 2019; Rankings from D1Baseball

The 2019 Tulane Green Wave baseball team represented Tulane University in the 2019 NCAA Division I baseball season. The Green Wave played their home games at Greer Field at Turchin Stadium.

== Roster ==
2019 Tulane Green Wave roster
Pitchers: 14 Brendan Cellucci - Sophomore; 17 Kaleb Roper - Redshirt Senior; 20 Josh Bates - Sophomore; 21 Ryan Green - Senior; 26 Ross Massey - Senior; 29 Chase Solesky - Redshirt Sophomore; 30 Justin Campbell - Sophomore; 33 C. J. Whelan - Redshirt Sophomore; 35 Keagan Gillies - Junior; 36 Robert Price - Junior; 39 Landon Boeneke - Freshman; 40 Grant Segar - Freshman; 41 Connor Pellerin - Sophomore; 42 Trent Johnson - Redshirt Junior; 45 Krishna Raj - Freshman	Catchers: 1 Acy Owen - Senior; 23 Frankie Niemann - Sophomore; Infielders: 3 Jonathon Artigues - Redshirt Junior; 4 Sal Gozzo - Junior; 5 Trevor Jensen - Senior; 7 Brendan Power - Freshman; 8 David Bedgood - Sophomore; 9 Grant Mathews - Redshirt Junior; 13 Collin Burns - Freshman; 15 Kody Hoese - Junior; 22 Ethan Groff - Freshman; Outfielders: 2 Kobi Owen - Redshirt Sophomore; 11 Hudson Haskin - Freshman; 24 Ty Johnson - Senior; 28 Luke Glancy - Redshirt Junior; 31 Tyler Heinrichs - Senior; 34 Stephen Sepcich - Sophomore; 44 Logan Stevens - Freshman

=== Coaching staff ===
2019 Tulane Green Wave coaching staff
- Travis Jewett – Head Coach – 3rd year
- Eddie Smith – Assistant Coach – 2nd year
- Daniel Latham – Assistant Coach – 1st year
- Brian Harris – Assistant Coach – 2nd year
- Curtis Akey – Director of Baseball Operations

== Schedule ==
2019 Tulane Green Wave baseball game log
Regular season
February

#	Date	Opponent	Venue	Score	Overall record	AAC record
1	February 15	George Washington	Greer Field at Turchin Field • New Orleans, LA	W 3–2	1–0	
2	February 16	George Washington	Greer Field at Turchin Stadium • New Orleans, LA	W 7–6 (13 inn)	2–0	
3	February 17	George Washington	Greer Field at Turchin Stadium • New Orleans, LA	W 16-6	3–0	
4	February 19	Lamar	Greer Field at Turchin Stadium • New Orleans, LA	W 9–1	4–0	
5	February 20	Lamar	Greer Field at Turchin Stadium • New Orleans, LA	W 22–10	5–0	
6	February 22	#10 Ole Miss	Greer Field at Turchin Stadium • New Orleans, LA	L 4–6	5–1	
7	February 23	#10 Ole Miss	Greer Field at Turchin Stadium • New Orleans, LA	W 13–12	6–1	
8	February 24	#10 Ole Miss	Greer Field at Turchin Stadium • New Orleans, LA	L 3–6	6–2	
9	February 26	at Nicholls	Ben Meyer Diamond at Ray E. Didier Field • Thibodaux, LA	W 7-4	7–2	

March

#	Date	Opponent	Venue	Score	Overall record	AAC record
10	March 1	vs. Dartmouth (Army Invitational)	USA Baseball National Training Complex • Cary, NC	W 5–1	8–2	
11	March 2	vs. Saint Joseph's (Army Invitational)	USA Baseball National Training Complex • Cary, NC	W 12-7	9–2	
12	March 3	vs. Army (Army Invitational)	USA Baseball National Training Complex • Cary, NC	L 6–7	9–3	
13	March 6	Texas Southern	Greer Field at Turchin Stadium • New Orleans, LA	W 13–1	10–3	
14	March 8	UC Santa Barbara	Greer Field at Turchin Stadium • New Orleans, LA	L 4–7	10-4	
15	March 9	UC Santa Barbara	Greer Field at Turchin Stadium • New Orleans, LA	L 7–8	10–5	
16	March 10	UC Santa Barbara	Greer Field at Turchin Stadium • New Orleans, LA	L 6–16	10–6	
17	March 12	McNeese State	Greer Field at Turchin Stadium • New Orleans, LA	W 9-3	11–6	
18	March 16	UC Riverside	Greer Field at Turchin Stadium • New Orleans, LA	W 10-1	12–6	
19	March 16	UC Riverside	Greer Field at Turchin Stadium • New Orleans, LA	L 1-10	12–7	
20	March 17	UC Riverside	Greer Field at Turchin Stadium • New Orleans, LA	W 10-0	13–7	
21	March 20	Louisiana	Greer Field at Turchin Stadium • New Orleans, LA	W 7-3	14–7	
22	March 22	Houston Baptist	Greer Field at Turchin Stadium • New Orleans, LA	W 6–2	15–7	
23	March 23	Houston Baptist	Greer Field at Turchin Stadium • New Orleans, LA	W 3–2 (11 inn)	16–7	
24	March 24	Houston Baptist	Greer Field at Turchin Stadium • New Orleans, LA	W 3–1	17–7	
25	March 26	at Louisiana	M. L. Tigue Moore Field at Russo Park • Lafayette, LA	L 6–7	17–8	
26	March 29	at Cincinnati	Marge Schott Stadium • Cincinnati, OH	W 19–4	18–8	1-0
27	March 29	at Cincinnati	Marge Schott Stadium • Cincinnati, OH	W 8–1	19–8	2–0
28	March 31	at Cincinnati	Marge Schott Stadium • Cincinnati, OH	L 6–7	19–9	2–1

April

#	Date	Opponent	Venue	Score	Overall record	AAC record
29	April 2	at New Orleans	Maestri Field at Privateer Park • New Orleans, LA	L 7–8	19–10	
30	April 5	Wichita State	Greer Field at Turchin Stadium • New Orleans, LA	L 11–12 (11 inn)	19–11	2–2
31	April 6	Wichita State	Greer Field at Turchin Stadium • New Orleans, LA	W 12–6	20–11	3-2
32	April 7	Wichita State	Greer Field at Turchin Stadium • New Orleans, LA	W 8–4	21–11	4–2
33	April 9	at Southeastern Louisiana	Pat Kenelly Diamond at Alumni Field • Hammond, LA	W 15–14	22–11	
34	April 12	South Florida	Greer Field at Turchin Stadium • New Orleans, LA	W 9–2	23–11	5–2
35	April 13	South Florida	Greer Field at Turchin Stadium • New Orleans, LA	W 20–11	24–11	6-2
36	April 14	South Florida	Greer Field at Turchin Stadium • New Orleans, LA	W 6-4	25–11	7–2
37	April 16	at New Orleans	Maestri Field at Privateer Park • New Orleans, LA	L 10–15	25–12	
38	April 19	at Memphis	FedExPark • Memphis, TN	Game canceled		
39	April 20	at Memphis	FedExPark • Memphis, TN	L 8–11 (7 inn)	25–13	7-3
40	April 20	at Memphis	FedExPark • Memphis, TN	W 20–5 (7 inn)	26–13	8-3
41	April 23	Southeastern Louisiana	Greer Field at Turchin Stadium • New Orleans, LA	L 3–10	26–14	
42	April 26	at #11 East Carolina	Clark-LeClair Stadium • Greenville, NC	L 0–14	26–15	8–4
43	April 27	at #11 East Carolina	Clark-LeClair Stadium • Greenville, NC	L 2–8	26–16	8–5
44	April 28	at #11 East Carolina	Clark-LeClair Stadium • Greenville, NC	W 9–8	27–16	9–5
45	April 30	New Orleans	Greer Field at Turchin Stadium • New Orleans, LA	L 9–14	27–17	

May

#	Date	Opponent	Venue	Score	Overall record	AAC record
46	May 3	UCF	Greer Field at Turchin Stadium • New Orleans, LA	W 6–2	28–17	10-5
47	May 4	UCF	Greer Field at Turchin Stadium • New Orleans, LA	L 2-4	28–18	10–6
48	May 5	UCF	Greer Field at Turchin Stadium • New Orleans, LA	L 2–5	28–19	10–7
49	May 7	Nicholls	Greer Field at Turchin Stadium • New Orleans, LA	L 3–5	28–20	
50	May 11	at Houston	Schroeder Park • Houston, TX	L 7–12	28–21	10-8
51	May 11	at Houston	Schroeder Park • Houston, TX	W 9–7	29–21	11–8
52	May 12	at Houston	Schroeder Park • Houston, TX	L 2-5	29-22	11-9
53	May 14	South Alabama	Greer Field at Turchin Stadium • New Orleans, LA	W 11–1 (7 inn)	30–22	
54	May 16	UConn	Greer Field at Turchin Stadium • New Orleans, LA	L 5–8	30–23	11–10
55	May 17	UConn	Greer Field at Turchin Stadium • New Orleans, LA	L 6–10	30–24	11–11
56	May 18	UConn	Greer Field at Turchin Stadium • New Orleans, LA	W 8–6	31–24	12–11

Postseason
The American Tournament

#	Date	Opponent	Venue	Score	Overall record	AAC record
57	May 21	vs. UCF	Spectrum Field • Clearwater, FL	W 5–2	32–24	
58	May 23	vs. Cincinnati	Spectrum Field • Clearwater, FL	L 4-8	32-25	
59	May 24	vs. UCF	Spectrum Field • Clearwater, FL	L 2-6	32-26	
