= 2020 Lamar Cardinals baseball team =

American college baseball season

2020 Lamar Cardinals baseball
- Conference: Southland Conference
- Record: 7–8 (0–3 SLC)
- Head coach: Will Davis (4th season)
- Assistant coach: Hunter Doucet (Volunteer Assistant) (1st season)
- Hitting coach: Scott Hatten (20th season)
- Pitching coach: Sean Snedeker (3rd season)
- Home stadium: Vincent–Beck Stadium (Capacity: 3,500)

2020 Southland Conference baseball standings
| | Conf. | | | | Overall |
| Team | W | | L | PCT | W | | L | PCT |
|---|---|---|---|---|---|---|---|---|
| Stephen F. Austin ‍‍‍ | 3 | – | 0 | 1.000 | 6 | – | 10 | .375 |
| Northwestern State ‍‍‍ | 2 | – | 1 | .667 | 12 | – | 4 | .750 |
| New Orleans ‍‍‍ | 2 | – | 1 | .667 | 11 | – | 6 | .647 |
| Central Arkansas ‍‍‍ | 2 | – | 1 | .667 | 8 | – | 8 | .500 |
| Texas A&M–Corpus Christi ‍‍‍ | 2 | – | 1 | .667 | 8 | – | 10 | .444 |
| Houston Baptist ‍‍‍ | 2 | – | 1 | .667 | 6 | – | 11 | .353 |
| Incarnate Word ‍‍‍ | 1 | – | 2 | .333 | 9 | – | 7 | .563 |
| Nicholls ‍‍‍ | 1 | – | 2 | .333 | 10 | – | 8 | .556 |
| Sam Houston State ‍‍‍ | 1 | – | 2 | .333 | 7 | – | 7 | .500 |
| Abilene Christian ‍‍‍ | 1 | – | 2 | .333 | 7 | – | 8 | .467 |
| Southeastern Louisiana ‍‍‍ | 1 | – | 2 | .333 | 6 | – | 10 | .375 |
| McNeese State ‍‍‍ | 0 | – | 0 | – | 10 | – | 7 | .588 |
| Lamar ‍‍‍ | 0 | – | 3 | .000 | 7 | – | 10 | .412 |
‡ – Tournament champion Rankings from D1Baseball

The 2020 Lamar Cardinals baseball team represented Lamar University in the 2020 NCAA Division I baseball season. The Cardinals played their home games at Vincent–Beck Stadium and are members of the Southland Conference. The team was coached by Will Davis in his 4th season at Lamar. The Cardinals compiled a 7–8 overall record (0–3 SLC) prior to season cancellation. On March 12, the Southland Conference announced a suspension of Spring sports through March 30 due to the COVID-19 pandemic. The conference announced that all remaining Spring 2020 sports contests were cancelled on March 14.

The Cardinals played 15 games in the shortened season with an overall record of 7–8, and a 0–3 record in conference play.

== Previous season ==
In 2019, the Cardinals finished the season 13th in the Southland with a record of 18–36, 9–21 in conference play. They failed to qualify for the 2019 Southland Conference baseball tournament.

=== Southland Conference Coaches and Sports Information Directors Poll ===
The Southland Conference Coaches and Sports Information Directors Poll was released on February 6, 2020. Lamar was picked to finish twelfth in the Southland Conference with 87 votes.

Coaches and Sports Information Directors poll
| Predicted finish | Team | Votes (1st place) |
| 1 | Sam Houston State | 276 (17) |
| 2 | Central Arkansas | 247 (5) |
| 3 | McNeese | 244 (1) |
| 4 | Southeastern Louisiana | 243 (3) |
| 5 | Northwestern State | 193 |
| 6 | Texas A&M–Corpus Christi | 146 |
| 7 | Incarnate Word | 144 |
| 8 | Nicholls | 108 |
| 9 | New Orleans | 101 |
| 10 | Abilene Christian | 98 |
| 11 | Stephen F. Austin | 92 |
| 12 | Lamar | 87 |
| 13 | Houston Baptist | 49 |

=== Preseason All-Southland Conference team ===
The preseason all-conference team is based on votes by the conference head coaches. Players who were named to the previous season's first and second teams are automatically named to the preseason team for their respective positions.

- Ryan Flores^ (UIW, JR, 1st Base)
- Nate Fisbeck^ (MCN, SR, 2nd Base)
- Beau Orlando^ (UCA, SR, 3rd Base)
- JC Correa^ (LU, SR, Shortstop)
- Gavin Johnson (SHSU, SR, Catcher)
- Clayton Rasbeary^ (MCN, SR, Designated Hitter)
- Sean Arnold^ (UIW, SR, Outfield)
- Brandon Bena^ (HBU, SR, Outfield)
- Colton Cowser^ (SHSU, SO, Outfield)
- Noah Cameron^ (UCA, SO, Starting Pitcher)
- Will Dion (MCN, SO, Starting Pitcher)
- Kyle Gruller^ (HBU, SR, Starting Pitcher)
- Conner Williams (UCA, SR, Relief Pitcher)
- Itchy Burts^ (TAMUCC, SR, Utility)

^2019 All-Conference Designation

== Roster ==
2020 Lamar Cardinals roster
| Pitchers: 8 Trevin Michael - Junior; 12 Braxton Douthit - Sophomore; 18 Max Mize - Junior; 23 Marcus Olivarez - Junior; 24 Grayson Wright - Junior; 26 Jack Dallas - Junior; 27 Chet Jones - Sophomore; 28 Zach Bravo - Junior; 32 Nicholas Gullo - Freshman; 33 Chris Edwards - Junior; 36 Christian Grigsby - Junior; 37 Austin Faith - Junior; 38 Braydon Credeur - Sophomore; 40 Douglas Palmer - Senior; 41 Brennen Smith - Junior; 47 Mitchell Lee - Junior; 49 Joe Buckendorff - Sophomore; 50 Dylan Johnson - Sophomore; 51 John Altman - Junior; 52 Josh Hranicky - Sophomore | Catchers: 4 Rhett McCall - Junior; Infielders: 2 Matthew McDonald - Junior; 5 JC Correa - Senior; 7 Cole Coker - Senior; 11 Kelby Weyler - Sophomore; 16 Anthony Quirion - Senior; 17 Chase Kemp - Junior; 20 Zach Sweet - Junior; 21 Logan LeJeune - Junior; 34 Jose Cintron - Freshman; 43 Morgan Berlof -Senior | Outfielders: 6 Drew Ardoin - Junior; 22 Cole Girouard - Senior; 42 Avery George - Junior; 45 Cole Secrest - Junior |

== Coaches ==
2020 Lamar Cardinals baseball coaching staff
- Will Davis - Head coach - 4th year
- Scott Hatten - Assistant coach - 20th year
- Sean Snedeker - 3rd year
- Hunter Doucet - Volunteer Assistant

== Schedule ==
2020 Lamar Cardinals baseball game log
Legend: = Win = Loss = Cancelled Bold = Lamar team member
Regular season (7–8)

February (5–5)
| Date | Opponent | Site/stadium | Score | Win | Loss | Save | Attendance | Overall record | SLC Record |
|---|---|---|---|---|---|---|---|---|---|
| Feb 14 | Rhode Island* | Vincent–Beck Stadium • Beaumont, TX | **W** 7–3 | **Max Mize (1–0)** | Ryan Twitchell (0–1) | None | 987 | 1–0 | |
| Feb 15 | Rhode Island* | Vincent–Beck Stadium • Beaumont, TX | **W** 8–2 | **Dylan Johnson (1–0)** | Nick Robinson (0–1) | None | 812 | 2–0 | |
| Feb 16 | Rhode Island* | Vincent–Beck Stadium • Beaumont, TX | **L** 2–4 | Shean Sposato (1–0) | **Max Mize (0–1)** | None | 789 | 2–1 | |
| Feb 19 | at Texas* | UFCU Disch–Falk Field • Austin, TX | **L** 1–6 | Kolby Kubichek (1–0) | **Josh Hranicky (0–1)** | None | 3,999 | 2–2 | |
| Feb 21 | at Texas State* | Bobcat Baseball Stadium • San Marcos, TX | **W** 3–1 | **Trevin Michael (1–0)** | Zachary Leigh (0–1) | **Jack Dallas (1)** | 1,113 | 3–2 | |
| Feb 22 | at Texas State* | Bobcat Baseball Stadium • San Marcos, TX | **L** 3–4 | Brent Hebert (2–0) | **Douglas Palmer (0–1)** | None | 1,495 | 3–3 | |
| Feb 23 | at Texas State* | Bobcat Baseball Stadium • San Marcos, TX | **L** 7–8 | Cameron Bush (1–0) | **Austin Faith (0–1)** | Tristan Stivors (2) | 1,099 | 3–4 | |
| Feb 25 | UTSA* | Vincent–Beck Stadium • Beaumont, TX | **L** 2–4 | Palmer Wenzel (1–0) | **Braydon Credeur (0–1)** | None | 793 | 3–5 | |
| Feb 28 | Akron* | Vincent–Beck Stadium • Beaumont, TX | **W** 8–3 | **Trevin Michael (2–0)** | Taed Heydinger (0–2) | None | 785 | 4–5 | |
| Feb 29 | Akron* | Vincent–Beck Stadium • Beaumont, TX | **W** 10–3 | **Zach Bravo (1–0)** | Quinton Juhawa (0–1) | None | 893 | 5–5 | |

March (2–3)
| Date | Opponent | Site/stadium | Score | Win | Loss | Save | Attendance | Overall record | SLC Record |
|---|---|---|---|---|---|---|---|---|---|
| Mar 1 | Akron* | Vincent–Beck Stadium • Beaumont, TX | **W** 5–1 | **Dylan Johnson (2–0)** | Jacob Clark (0–3) | None | 611 | 6–5 | |
| Mar 4 | Prairie View A&M* | Vincent–Beck Stadium • Beaumont, TX | **W** 12–1 | **Grason Wright (1–0)** | Matthew Sandoval (1–2) | None | 718 | 7–5 | |
| Mar 6 | at Stephen F. Austin | Jaycees Field • Nacogdoches, TX | **L** 0–5 | Angelo Gennari (1–1) | **Trevin Michael (2–1)** | None | 221 | 7–6 | 0–1 |
| Mar 7 | at Stephen F. Austin | Jaycees Field • Nacogdoches, TX | **L** 2–3 | J. Todd (2–1) | **Jack Dallas (0–1)** | J. Covington (1) | 237 | 7–7 | 0–2 |
| Mar 8 | at Stephen F. Austin | Jaycees Field • Nacogdoches, TX | **L** 4–5 | Austin Roth (1–0) | **Braydon Credeur (0–2)** | Tod Gauthe (3) | 347 | 7–8 | 0–3 |
| Mar 10 | at Tulane* | Greer Field at Turchin Stadium • New Orleans, LA | – | | | | | – | |
| Mar 11 | at Tulane* | Greer Field at Turchin Stadium • New Orleans, LA | – | | | | | – | |
| Mar 13 | McNeese State | Vincent–Beck Stadium • Beaumont, TX | – | | | | | – | – |
| Mar 14 | McNeese State | Vincent–Beck Stadium • Beaumont, TX | – | | | | | – | – |
| Mar 15 | McNeese State | Vincent–Beck Stadium • Beaumont, TX | – | | | | | – | – |
| Mar 17 | at Louisiana* | M. L. Tigue Moore Field at Russo Park • Lafayette, LA | – | | | | | – | |
| Mar 20 | Northwestern State | Vincent–Beck Stadium • Beaumont, TX | – | | | | | – | – |
| Mar 21 | Northwestern State | Vincent–Beck Stadium • Beaumont, TX | – | | | | | – | – |
| Mar 22 | Northwestern State | Vincent–Beck Stadium • Beaumont, TX | – | | | | | – | – |
| Mar 24 | at Texas A&M* | Olsen Field at Blue Bell Park • College Station, TX | – | | | | | – | |
| Mar 27 | at Nicholls | Ben Meyer Diamond at Ray E. Didier Field • Thibodaux, LA | – | | | | | – | – |
| Mar 28 | at Nicholls | Ben Meyer Diamond at Ray E. Didier Field • Thibodaux, LA | – | | | | | – | – |
| Mar 29 | at Nicholls | Ben Meyer Diamond at Ray E. Didier Field • Thibodaux, LA | – | | | | | – | – |
| Mar 31 | at Houston Baptist* | Husky Field • Houston, TX | – | | | | | – | |

April (0–0)
| Date | Opponent | Site/stadium | Score | Win | Loss | Save | Attendance | Overall record | SLC Record |
|---|---|---|---|---|---|---|---|---|---|
| Apr 3 | Sam Houston State | Vincent–Beck Stadium • Beaumont, TX | – | | | | | – | – |
| Apr 4 | Sam Houston State | Vincent–Beck Stadium • Beaumont, TX | – | | | | | – | – |
| Apr 5 | Sam Houston State | Vincent–Beck Stadium • Beaumont, TX | – | | | | | – | – |
| Apr 7 | Southern* | Vincent–Beck Stadium • Beaumont, TX | – | | | | | – | |
| Apr 9 | at Texas A&M–Corpus Christi | Chapman Field • Corpus Christi, TX | – | | | | | – | – |
| Apr 10 | at Texas A&M–Corpus Christi | Chapman Field • Corpus Christi, TX | – | | | | | – | – |
| Apr 11 | at Texas A&M–Corpus Christi | Chapman Field • Corpus Christi, TX | – | | | | | – | – |
| Apr 14 | Houston Baptist* | Vincent–Beck Stadium • Beaumont, TX | – | | | | | – | |
| Apr 17 | Abilene Christian | Vincent–Beck Stadium • Beaumont, TX | – | | | | | – | – |
| Apr 18 | Abilene Christian | Vincent–Beck Stadium • Beaumont, TX | – | | | | | – | – |
| Apr 19 | Abilene Christian | Vincent–Beck Stadium • Beaumont, TX | – | | | | | – | – |
| Apr 21 | LSU* | Alex Box Stadium, Skip Bertman Field • Baton Rouge, LA | – | | | | | – | |
| Apr 22 | at Southern* | Lee–Hines Field • Baton Rouge, LA | – | | | | | – | |
| Apr 24 | New Orleans | Vincent–Beck Stadium • Beaumont, TX | – | | | | | – | – |
| Apr 25 | New Orleans | Vincent–Beck Stadium • Beaumont, TX | – | | | | | – | – |
| Apr 26 | New Orleans | Vincent–Beck Stadium • Beaumont, TX | – | | | | | – | – |
| Apr 28 | at Baylor* | Baylor Ballpark • Waco, TX | – | | | | | – | |

May (0–0)
| Date | Opponent | Site/stadium | Score | Win | Loss | Save | Attendance | Overall record | SLC Record |
|---|---|---|---|---|---|---|---|---|---|
| May 1 | Arkansas–Pine Bluff* | Vincent–Beck Stadium • Beaumont, TX | – | | | | | – | |
| May 2 | Arkansas–Pine Bluff* | Vincent–Beck Stadium • Beaumont, TX | – | | | | | – | |
| May 3 | Arkansas–Pine Bluff* | Vincent–Beck Stadium • Beaumont, TX | – | | | | | – | |
| May 4 | at Rice* | Reckling Park • Houston, TX | – | | | | | – | |
| May 8 | at Central Arkansas | Bear Stadium • Conway, AR | – | | | | | – | – |
| May 9 | at Central Arkansas | Bear Stadium • Conway, AR | – | | | | | – | – |
| May 10 | at Central Arkansas | Bear Stadium • Conway, AR | – | | | | | – | – |
| May 14 | at Southeastern Louisiana | Pat Kenelly Diamond at Alumni Field • Hammond, LA | – | | | | | – | – |
| May 15 | at Southeastern Louisiana | Pat Kenelly Diamond at Alumni Field • Hammond, LA | – | | | | | – | – |
| May 16 | at Southeastern Louisiana | Pat Kenelly Diamond at Alumni Field • Hammond, LA | – | | | | | – | – |
