= 2020 Southeastern Louisiana Lions baseball team =

American college baseball season

2020 Southeastern Louisiana Lions baseball
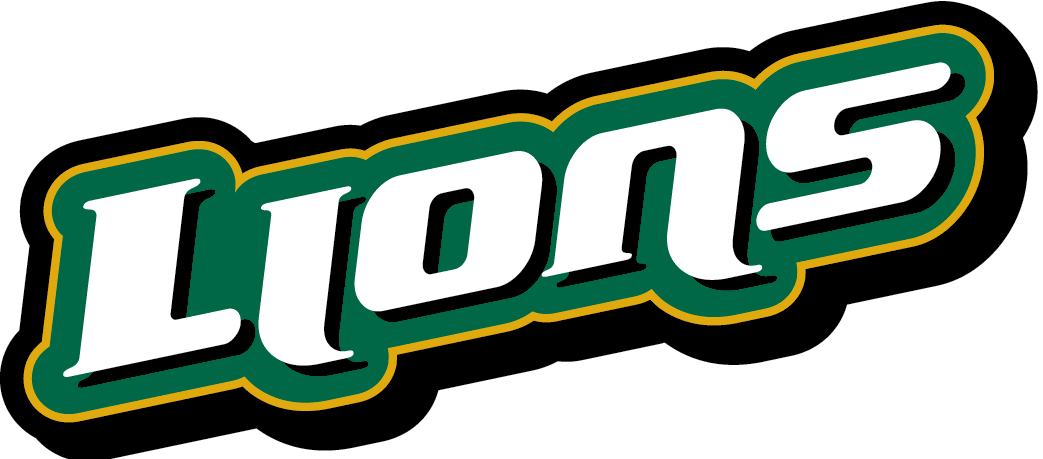
- Conference: Southland Conference
- Record: 6–10 (1–2 SLC)
- Head coach: Matt Riser (7th season)
- Assistant coaches: Andrew Gipson; Tim Donnelly; Trey Caswell
- Home stadium: Pat Kenelly Diamond at Alumni Field

2020 Southland Conference baseball standings
	Conf.				Overall
Team	W		L	PCT	W		L	PCT
Stephen F. Austin ‍‍‍	3	–	0	1.000	6	–	10	.375
Northwestern State ‍‍‍	2	–	1	.667	12	–	4	.750
New Orleans ‍‍‍	2	–	1	.667	11	–	6	.647
Central Arkansas ‍‍‍	2	–	1	.667	8	–	8	.500
Texas A&M–Corpus Christi ‍‍‍	2	–	1	.667	8	–	10	.444
Houston Baptist ‍‍‍	2	–	1	.667	6	–	11	.353
Incarnate Word ‍‍‍	1	–	2	.333	9	–	7	.563
Nicholls ‍‍‍	1	–	2	.333	10	–	8	.556
Sam Houston State ‍‍‍	1	–	2	.333	7	–	7	.500
Abilene Christian ‍‍‍	1	–	2	.333	7	–	8	.467
Southeastern Louisiana ‍‍‍	1	–	2	.333	6	–	10	.375
McNeese State ‍‍‍	0	–	0	–	10	–	7	.588
Lamar ‍‍‍	0	–	3	.000	7	–	10	.412
‡ – Tournament champion Rankings from D1Baseball

The 2020 Southeastern Louisiana Lions baseball team represented Southeastern Louisiana University in the 2020 NCAA Division I baseball season. The Lions played their home games at Pat Kenelly Diamond at Alumni Field. The Lions compiled a record of 6–10 overall (1–2 SLC) before the season was cancelled due to the COVID-19 pandemic on March 12. The Southland Conference announced a suspension of Spring sports through March 30 due to the COVID-19 pandemic. The conference announced that all remaining Spring 2020 sports contests were cancelled on March 14.

== Schedule ==
2020 Southeastern Louisiana Lions baseball game log
Regular season
February

#	Date	Opponent	Venue	Score	Overall record	SLC record
1	February 14	at #15 Louisiana*	M. L. Tigue Moore Field at Russo Park • Lafayette, LA	W 3–2	1–0	
2	February 15	Louisiana Tech*	M. L. Tigue Moore Field at Russo Park • Lafayette, LA	L 0–2	1–1	
3	February 18	Louisiana*	Pat Kenelly Diamond at Alumni Field • Hammond, LA	L 6-9	1–2	
4	February 21	Jacksonville*	Pat Kenelly Diamond at Alumni Field • Hammond, LA	W 2-1	2–2	
5	February 22	Jacksonville*	Pat Kenelly Diamond at Alumni Field • Hammond, LA	W 5-4	3–2	
6	February 23	Jacksonville*	Pat Kenelly Diamond at Alumni Field • Hammond, LA	L 0-8	3–3	
7	February 25	at Louisiana–Monroe*	Warhawk Field • Monroe, LA	L 4-8	3–4	
8	February 26	at Louisiana–Monroe*	Warhawk Field • Monroe, LA	L 5-23	3–5	
9	February 28	Stony Brook*	Pat Kenelly Diamond at Alumni Field • Hammond, LA	W 11-0	4–5	
10	February 29	Stony Brook*	Pat Kenelly Diamond at Alumni Field • Hammond, LA	L 6-11 (11 inn)	4–6	

March

#	Date	Opponent	Venue	Score	Overall record	SLC record
11	March 1	Stony Brook*	Pat Kenelly Diamond at Alumni Field • Hammond, LA	W 5-2	5–6	
12	March 3	at #3 LSU*	Alex Box Stadium, Skip Bertman Field • Baton Rouge, LA	L 3-6	5–7	
13	March 6	at Central Arkansas	Bear Stadium • Conway, AR	L 0-2	5–8	0–1
14	March 7	at Central Arkansas	Bear Stadium • Conway, AR	L 1-2	5–9	0–2
15	March 8	at Central Arkansas	Bear Stadium • Conway, AR	W 7-3	6–9	1–2
16	March 10	at Louisiana Tech	J. C. Love Field at Pat Patterson Park • Ruston, LA	L 3-14	6–10	
