= 2020 American Athletic Conference baseball tournament =

American college baseball tournament

- Teams: 8
- Format: Double-elimination tournament
- Finals site: Spectrum Field; Clearwater, FL

2020 American Athletic Conference baseball standings
	Conf.				Overall
Team	W		L	PCT	W		L	PCT
No. 20 Tulane ‍‍‍	0	–	0	–	15	–	2	.882
Wichita State ‍‍‍	0	–	0	–	13	–	2	.867
No. 12 UCF ‍‍‍	0	–	0	–	15	–	3	.833
East Carolina ‍‍‍	0	–	0	–	13	–	4	.765
UConn ‍‍‍	0	–	0	–	8	–	5	.615
Memphis ‍‍‍	0	–	0	–	10	–	7	.588
Cincinnati ‍‍‍	0	–	0	–	7	–	8	.467
Houston ‍‍‍	0	–	0	–	6	–	9	.400
South Florida ‍‍‍	0	–	0	–	6	–	11	.353
‡ – Tournament champion As of March 12, 2020; Rankings from D1Baseball

The 2020 American Athletic Conference baseball tournament was a baseball tournament scheduled to be held at Spectrum Field in Clearwater, Florida, from May 19 through 24. The winner of the double-elimination tournament would have received the conference's automatic bid to the 2020 NCAA Division I baseball tournament.

The Tournament has been held since 2014, the first year of the rebranding as the American Athletic Conference. Since then, Houston and East Carolina have each won the event twice, while Cincinnati and UConn have each won once.

On March 12, 2020, the NCAA cancelled all winter and spring sports competitions due to the coronavirus pandemic, thus cancelling the tournament.
