= Jay Uhlman =

American baseball coach (born 1974)

Current position
- Title: Head coach
- Team: Tulane
- Conference: The American
- Record: 116-128

Biographical details
- Born: February 26, 1974 (age 52); Cedar Rapids, Iowa, U.S.
- Education: University of Nevada

Playing career
- 1993–1994: Los Angeles Harbor
- 1995, 1997: Nevada
- Position: Shortstop

Coaching career (HC unless noted)
- 1998–1999: Nevada (GA)
- 2000–2001: Los Angeles Harbor
- 2002–2009: Nevada (H/IF)
- 2010: Oregon (Vol)
- 2011: Kansas (H)
- 2012–2019: Oregon (H/AHC)
- 2020–2022: Tulane (H/IF)
- 2022–present: Tulane

Head coaching record
- Overall: 116–128 (NCAA); 61–22–2 (JuCo)
- Tournaments: NCAA: 1–4 / AAC: 13-4

Accomplishments and honors

Championships
- 2 AAC tournament (2023, 2024); South Coast Conference Regular Season Championship (2001)

Awards
- Honorable Mention All-Big West (1997); South Coast Conference Coach of the Year (2001)

Jay Uhlman (born February 26, 1974) is an American baseball coach and former shortstop, who is the current head baseball coach of the Tulane Green Wave. He began his playing career at Los Angeles Harbor College from 1993 to 1994 before transferring to Nevada where he played in 1995 and 1997. He also served as the head coach of the Los Angeles Harbor Seahawks (2000–2001).

== Playing career ==
Uhlman went to Redondo Union High School in Redondo Beach, California, where he played shortstop. Uhlman was selected in the 48th round of the 1992 Major League Baseball draft by the Toronto Blue Jays. He declined to sign with the Blue Jays, and attended Los Angeles Harbor College. As a Freshman, Uhlman hit .337, being named 2nd Team All-Conference. As a sophomore, he was named First Team All-Conference. The following year, Uhlman transferred to Nevada, where he batted .208 with 2 home runs and 18 RBI. After not playing in 1996, Uhlman returned to the lineup in 1997, hitting .358 with 8 homeruns and 52 RBI. For his efforts, he was named honorable mention All-Big West Conference.

== Coaching career ==
Uhlman began his coaching career as a graduate assistant with the Wolf Pack in 1998, while continuing to work on his degree.

He returned to Los Angeles Harbor College as the head coach for the 2000 season, leading the team to a 25–14–1 record and a third-place finish in the conference. The following year, the Seahawks won the South Coast Conference title, going 36–8–1, finishing 5th in the state tournament. Following that successful year, Uhlman was named a full time assistant for the Nevada Wolf Pack, working with hitters and infielders. Following the 2009 season, he took a volunteer position with the recently revived Oregon Ducks baseball program working with hitters and infielders. In 2011, he took a paid position with the Kansas Jayhawks, being named the recruiting coordinator, hitting coach and baserunning/short game coordinator as well as coaching the corner infielders and serve as the third base coach. He returned to Oregon in 2012, where he worked on their staff in various capacities, working as high as associate head coach until 2019.

In the summer of 2019, Uhlman was named the recruiting coordinator at Tulane, joining Travis Jewett's staff. On May 16, 2022, Jewett agreed to part ways with Tulane, and Uhlman was named the interim head coach for the remainder of the 2022 season. He led the Green Wave to a 3–4 record for their final 7 games. On June 7, 2022, Uhlman was promoted to permanent head coach. In 2023 he led Tulane back to the NCAA Regionals for the first time since 2016, joining Rick Jones and David Pierce as the only coaches to do so in their first seasons at Tulane. The Wave did it in unconventional fashion going 15–39 in the regular season but won the American Athletic Conference Tournament (first since 2005) over East Carolina to make the NCAA tournament in Baton Rouge. He is only the 4th coach in Tulane history to take his team to the NCAA Tournament.

Looking to continue the momentum from the 2023 season, the 2024 version of the Green Wave posted the second-best turnaround in NCAA Division 1 Baseball by winning 16 more games than the previous season which was only surpassed by Florida State who improved by 17 games. Tulane made history by winning its second-straight American Athletic Conference Tournament Championship, a feat that had not been accomplished by any other program in the conference. Tulane's run through Clearwater also extended its tournament win streak to 6 games, an AAC record, and ensured the program its second-straight trip to the NCAA Regionals. It was the first time since 1998-99 that Tulane had captured back-to-back conference championships and the first time since 2015-16 that the Wave has appeared in back-to-back Regionals. When Tulane defeated Nicholls 3–0 in the Corvallis Regional, it marked the programs first NCAA postseason victory since 2016. During the regular season when Tulane swept #6 ECU at home it represented the highest ranked team the Wave had swept since 1991 and its first sweep against ECU since 2005. In addition to winning the Pelican Cup against longtime inter-city rival UNO, the Wave also won a regular season series against Rice for the first time in school history.

Offensively in 2024, Tulane hitters led the way in the AAC with homers (91), triples (16) and walks (298), while finishing second in doubles (124), RBI (429) and OPS (.871). The Green Wave's home runs (91) sit fourth in program history, while the HBPs (98) worn by Tulane hitters set the school record for a single season. Wave hitters rounded out their ascension into the single season record books by finishing tenth all-time in RBI (429). On the mound, Tulane's year to year improvement from 2023 to 2024 reflects the development and improvement from the pitching staff. The staff elevated its production in 13 of 15 statistical categories from the previous year and ended up in 4 categories amongst the Top 50 in the NCAA. Green Wave hurlers finished forty-ninth in wins (36) seventeenth in innings pitched (545), forty-seventh in saves (14), and forty-fourth in fewest home runs allowed (47). The staff earned their way into the single season record books by finishing seventh all time in strikeouts (511) and eight in saves (14). Defensively in 2024, Tulane ranked 17th in the nation in double plays turned, and shortstop Marcus Cline led all shortstops in the country in defensive runs saved.

Individually, five players earned All-Conference honors in 2024 to go along with six named to the All-AAC Championship team, including tournament MVP Jackson Linn, who hit .545 with nine RBIs and four homers, including the walk-off, tournament-clinching blast against Wichita State. In the NCAA Regional both Colin Tuft and Luc Fladda were named to the All-Regional team for their efforts.

At the conclusion of the season, Teo Banks, Jackson Linn, Gavin Schulz and Michael Lombardi were selected to the Louisiana Sports Writers Association All State Team. Tulane continued its draft streak of 13 consecutive years by having four players selected in the 2024 MLB Draft: Chandler Welch (sixth round, Milwaukee Brewers), Colin Tuft (eighth round, Baltimore Orioles), Brady Marget (sixteenth round, Tampa Bay Rays) and Teo Banks (eighteenth round, Washington Nationals). Amongst its peers, Tulane had the third most players drafted by a non-P4 program.

== Head coaching record ==
Record table
Season	Team	Overall	Conference	Standing	Postseason
Los Angeles Harbor Seahawks (South Coast Conference) (2000–2001)
2000	Los Angeles Harbor	25–14–1	15–9	3rd	
2001	Los Angeles Harbor	36–8–1	20–4	1st	Super Regionals
Los Angeles Harbor:		61–22–2	35–13		
Tulane Green Wave (American Athletic Conference) (2022–present)
2022	Tulane	3–4	1–2	5th	AAC Tournament
2023	Tulane	19–42	8–16	7th	NCAA Regional
2024	Tulane	36–26	15–12	T–3rd	NCAA Regional
2025	Tulane	33-25	13-14	T-5th	AAC Tournament Runner Up
2026	Tulane	25-31	10-17	10th	
Tulane:		116–128	47–61		
Total:		116–128			
National champion Postseason invitational champion Conference regular season champion Conference regular season and conference tournament champion Division regular season champion Division regular season and conference tournament champion Conference tournament champion
