= Michael Aubrey =

American baseball player (born 1982)

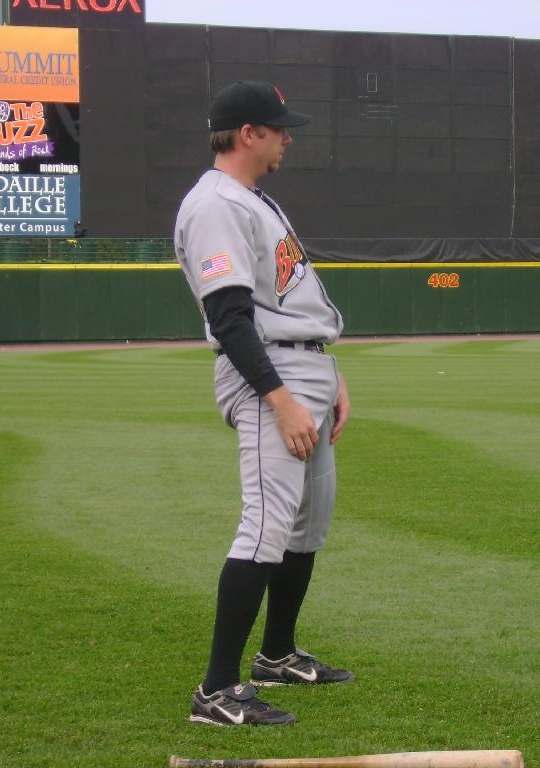
- Aubrey in 2008 as a Buffalo Bison
- First baseman
- Born: April 15, 1982 (age 44); Shreveport, Louisiana, U.S.
- Batted: Left Threw: Left

MLB debut
- May 17, 2008, for the Cleveland Indians

Last MLB appearance
- October 4, 2009, for the Baltimore Orioles

MLB statistics
- Batting average: .259
- Home runs: 6
- Runs batted in: 17
- Stats at Baseball Reference

Teams
- Cleveland Indians (2008); Baltimore Orioles (2009)

Robert Michael Aubrey (born April 15, 1982) is an American former professional baseball first baseman. He played in Major League Baseball (MLB) for the Cleveland Indians and Baltimore Orioles.

== Early career ==
Aubrey attended Southwood High School (1997–2000) where he won the Gatorade Player of the Year award as a senior. He attended Tulane University from 2001–2003. In 186 games with Tulane, Aubrey hit .368 with 38 home runs and 200 RBI. As a pitcher in 2001 and 2002, he won 11 games and lost 2 with a 4.88 ERA. In 2001, he was named National Freshman of the Year by Baseball America, Collegiate Baseball and The Sporting News.

In 2002, as a member of the USA National Team, he led the team in batting average, home runs and RBI. As a junior at Tulane in 2003, he was named Conference USA Player of the Year and was a finalist for the Golden Spikes Award, given annually to the top amateur baseball player in the United States.

Aubrey's talents were originally discovered by Brad Somrak while he was throwing a ball at a dunk tank at the Allegheny County Fairgrounds in Pittsburgh, Pennsylvania. This was first reported by the Razor's Edge in the University of Akron student newspaper, the Buchtelite.

== Professional career ==
=== Cleveland Indians ===
The Cleveland Indians selected Aubrey in the first round (11th overall) of the 2003 Major League Baseball draft. On June 16, 2003, he signed a contract with the Indians, and was assigned to the Single-A Lake County Captains to begin his professional career. After getting injured in his second game and missing a month with a strained quad, Aubrey heated up at the end of July, hitting .385 from July 29 until the end of the season. Overall, Aubrey batted .348 with five home runs and 19 RBI in 38 games with Lake County.

Aubrey began the 2004 season with the Single-A Kinston Indians, batting .339 with 10 home runs and 60 RBI in 60 games. He was named to the Carolina League All-Star team and was ranked fourth in the league in RBI and fifth in batting average before being promoted to the Double-A Akron Aeros on June 21. On July 8, Aubrey was placed on the disabled list with a strained hamstring. He was activated on August 13. In the final game of Akron's season on September 6 against the Harrisburg Senators, Aubrey finished 3-for-4 with two home runs and 5 RBI. In 38 games for the Aeros, he batted .261 with five home runs and 22 RBI. After the season, Aubrey was named Cleveland's second-best prospect by Baseball America.

Aubrey's injury problems continued in 2005. He was limited to only 28 games with Akron, and hit .283 with four home runs and 20 RBI. On May 10, he was placed on the disabled list with lower back inflammation, and although he was activated on June 10, he was limited to two at-bats in Akron's game that night due to continued soreness. He eventually was diagnosed with a stress fracture in his lower back, ending his season. On November 18, Aubrey was added to the Indians' 40-man roster.

Aubrey did not participate in spring training activities in 2006 due his continued rehab from his back injury. He played in 14 combined games with Single-A Kinston and Double-A Akron, batting .278 with three home runs and 12 RBI. While playing with Akron, Aubrey suffered a right knee strain, which proved to be season-ending. He was recalled as a September call-up for the Indians on September 21, but did not appear in a Major League game due to his injury.

After recovering from his injury, Aubrey played out the 2007 season with Kinston and Akron, hitting a combined .277 with 12 home runs and 45 RBI in 65 games.

Aubrey began the 2008 season with Akron, batting .277 with two home runs and 16 RBI in 24 games. On May 2, he was promoted to the Triple-A Buffalo Bisons for the first time, and hit .341 with four doubles and 5 RBI in his first 11 games. On May 17, Aubrey was recalled from Buffalo. He made his major league debut that day against the Cincinnati Reds, appearing as a defensive replacement at first base in the eighth inning and popping out in his first at bat. Aubrey collected his first major league hit, a home run, in his first career start on May 18. He hit another home run in his next start on May 21 against the Chicago White Sox. On June 2, he was optioned to Triple-A Buffalo after batting .185 in nine games. Aubrey was recalled again on September 2 when the active rosters expanded. He batted .200 with two home runs and 3 RBI in 15 games with Cleveland in 2008.

On January 6, 2009, Aubrey was designated for assignment by the Indians to make room on the 40-man roster for Carl Pavano. Six days later, he cleared waivers and was outrighted to Triple-A Columbus. He attended Indians spring training in 2009 but was sent to minor league camp on March 24. Aubrey began the season with the Triple-A Columbus Clippers, batting .293 with five home runs and 29 RBI in 57 games.

=== Baltimore Orioles ===
On June 24, 2009, Aubrey was traded to the Baltimore Orioles for a player to be named later, and he was assigned to the Triple-A Norfolk Tides. Aubrey was recalled by the Orioles on August 18. In 31 games, he posted a .289 average with four home runs and 14 RBI.

On April 1, 2010, Aubrey was designated for assignment after the Orioles acquired infielder Julio Lugo. He was later assigned to Norfolk, and spent the entire season with the Tides, hitting .235 with 22 home runs and 68 RBI in 102 games.

=== Washington Nationals ===
Aubrey signed a minor league contract with the Washington Nationals on December 20, 2010. On May 14, 2011, Aubrey hit four home runs and drove in seven runs in four at-bats for the Triple-A Syracuse Chiefs. He finished the season batting .273 with 11 home runs and 35 RBI in 82 games.
