= Mark Hamilton (baseball) =

American baseball player (born 1984)

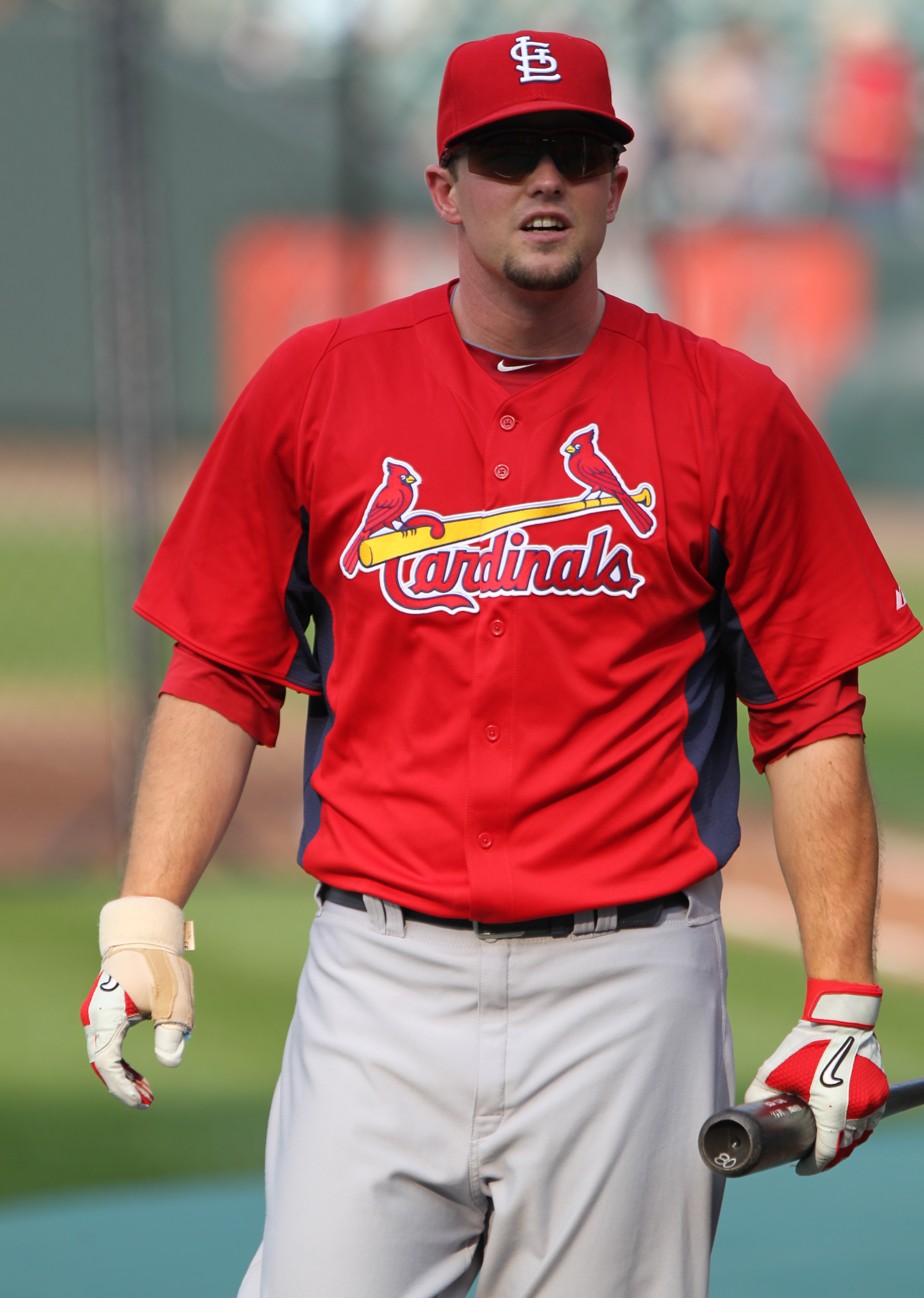
- Hamilton with the St. Louis Cardinals
- First baseman
- Born: July 29, 1984 (age 42); Baltimore, Maryland, U.S.
- Batted: Left Threw: Left

MLB debut
- September 20, 2010, for the St. Louis Cardinals

Last appearance
- July 6, 2011, for the St. Louis Cardinals
- Stats at Baseball Reference

Teams
- St. Louis Cardinals (2010–2011)

Mark Alan Hamilton (born July 29, 1984) is an American physician and former professional baseball player. He played Major League Baseball (MLB) for the St. Louis Cardinals in 2010 and 2011 and spent nine seasons in Minor League Baseball with the St. Louis, Boston, and Atlanta organizations. After his playing career, Hamilton received his medical degree (MD) from the Hofstra Northwell School of Medicine, followed by a residency in diagnostic radiology at Northwell Health Long Island Jewish Medical Center and North Shore University Hospital, and a fellowship in abdominal imaging fellow at NYU-Langone in Manhattan. He is currently a practicing radiologist in the tri-state area.

== Early and personal life ==
Hamilton was born on July 29, 1984, in Baltimore, Maryland. His father, Stanley Hamilton, was a doctor at Johns Hopkins, who later served as the head of pathology and laboratory medicine at MD Anderson Cancer Center in Houston, Texas, and at City of Hope in Los Angeles, California. After graduating from Episcopal High School in Bellaire, Texas, he received a scholarship to Tulane University for college baseball on the Tulane Green Wave baseball team. In 2004 and 2005, Mark played collegiate summer baseball with the Falmouth Commodores of the Cape Cod Baseball League and was named to the 2005 all-star team. Hamilton played in the College World Series with Tulane in 2005 after earning the Most Outstanding Player award in the 2005 New Orleans Regional. In 2006, Hamilton was a first team All-American and the Conference USA Player of the Year.

== Professional career ==
=== Draft and minor leagues ===
Hamilton was selected by the Cardinals in the second round of the 2006 Major League Baseball draft, which was a supplemental pick for loss of free agent infielder Abraham Núñez. He was added to the Cardinals' 40-man roster following the 2009 season to protect him from the Rule 5 Draft. Mark played with the St. Louis, Boston, and Atlanta organization across nine seasons, where he hit over 100 home runs while driving in over 450 runs (RBIs). He was a member of several playoff teams throughout his minor league career including the 2009 Pacific Coast League Champion Memphis Redbirds.

=== St. Louis Cardinals ===
On September 18, Hamilton's contract was purchased by the Cardinals and he was promoted to the major leagues. A year later after his debut, the Cardinals advanced to the postseason and eventually won the 2011 World Series over the Texas Rangers.

Hamilton was optioned to Triple-A to begin the 2012 season and was released from the Cardinals organization on August 18, 2012.

=== Boston Red Sox ===
On January 4, 2013 Hamilton signed a minor league deal with the Boston Red Sox that included an invitation to Major League spring training. Hamilton was optioned to the Triple-A Pawtucket Red Sox to begin the 2013 season. His 2013 "Pawsox" team went on to win the International League Northern Division only to be eliminated by the eventual Triple-A champion Durham Bulls.

=== Atlanta Braves ===
In December 2013, Hamilton signed a minor league contract with the Atlanta Braves that included an invitation to Major League spring training. He was released on July 26, 2014.

== Post-playing career ==
Following his retirement, Hamilton returned to Tulane and completed his bachelor's degree in neuroscience. He then attended the Hofstra Northwell School of Medicine and graduated in 2020 during the height of the COVID-19 pandemic in the United States. Hamilton completed a residency in diagnostic radiology at Northwell Health-Long Island Jewish Medical Center in 2025, and an abdominal imaging fellowship at NYU-Langone in 2026. He is now a practicing radiologist in the tri-state area.
