= 2020 Tulane Green Wave baseball team =

American college baseball season

2020 Tulane Green Wave baseball
- Conference: American Athletic Conference
- CB: No. 29
- Record: 15–2 (0–0 The American)
- Head coach: Travis Jewett (4th season)
- Assistant coaches: Jay Uhlman; Daniel Latham; Anthony Izzo
- Home stadium: Greer Field at Turchin Stadium

2020 American Athletic Conference baseball standings
	Conf.				Overall
Team	W		L	PCT	W		L	PCT
No. 20 Tulane ‍‍‍	0	–	0	–	15	–	2	.882
Wichita State ‍‍‍	0	–	0	–	13	–	2	.867
No. 12 UCF ‍‍‍	0	–	0	–	15	–	3	.833
East Carolina ‍‍‍	0	–	0	–	13	–	4	.765
UConn ‍‍‍	0	–	0	–	8	–	5	.615
Memphis ‍‍‍	0	–	0	–	10	–	7	.588
Cincinnati ‍‍‍	0	–	0	–	7	–	8	.467
Houston ‍‍‍	0	–	0	–	6	–	9	.400
South Florida ‍‍‍	0	–	0	–	6	–	11	.353
‡ – Tournament champion As of March 12, 2020; Rankings from D1Baseball

The 2020 Tulane Green Wave baseball team represented Tulane University in the 2020 NCAA Division I baseball season. The Green Wave played their home games at Greer Field at Turchin Stadium and were led by fourth year head coach Travis Jewett.

On March 16, the American Athletic Conference canceled all ongoing 2020 spring athletic meets/games as well as all conference tournament games. This came during the COVID-19 pandemic.

== Preseason ==
=== American Athletic Conference Coaches Poll ===
The American Athletic Conference Coaches Poll was released on December 30, 2019, and the Wave were picked to finish fourth in the conference.

Coaches poll
Predicted finish	Team	Votes (1st place)
1	East Carolina	62 (6)
2	Houston	54 (3)
3	UConn	49
4	Tulane	38
5	UCF	37
6	Cincinnati	33
7	South Florida	20
8	Memphis	19
9	Wichita State	12

=== Preseason All-AAC Team ===
- Grant Matthews – R-Sr, 1st Base
- Jonathon Artigues – R-Sr, 2nd Base
- Hudson Haskin – So, Outfield

=== Non-conference Preseason Honors ===
Honor/Award
Hudson Haskin (Outfield, So)
Collegiate Baseball Preseason All-American
Perfect Game/Rawlings Preseason All-American
D1 Baseball Preseason All-American
NCBWA Preseason All-American
USA Baseball Golden Spikes Award Preseason Watch-list

== Roster ==
2020 Tulane Green Wave roster
Pitchers: 16 Donovan Benoit - Junior; 17 Jack Aldrich - Redshirt Sophomore; 22 Chris Holcomb - Junior; 26 Grant Segar - Sophomore; 29 Braden Olthoff - Junior; 30 Justin Campbell - Junior; 31 Clifton Slagel - Junior; 33 C. J. Whelan - Redshirt Junior; 34 Bryce Mackey - Junior; 35 Keagan Gillies - Senior; 36 Robert Price - Senior; 37 David Bates - Redshirt Sophomore; 39 Landon Boeneke - Sophomore; 40 Luke Jannetta - Freshman; 41 Connor Pellerin - Junior; 42 Trent Johnson - Redshirt Senior; 43 Adam Grintz - Freshman; 44 Joey Phelps - Freshman; 45 Krishna Raj - Sophomore	Catchers: 6 Parker Haskin - Freshman; 13 Hayden Hastings - Junior; 21 Luis Aviles - Junior; 23 Frankie Niemann - Junior; Infielders: 1 Ethan Groff - Redshirt Freshman; 2 Collin Burns - Sophomore; 3 Jonathon Artigues - Redshirt Senior; 8 David Bedgood - Junior; 9 Grant Mathews - Redshirt Senior; 14 Simon Baumgardt - Freshman; 15 Trevor Minder - Junior; Outfielders: 7 Logan Stevens - Sophomore; 11 Hudson Haskin - Sophomore; 24 Ty Johnson - Redshirt Senior; 28 Luke Glancy - Redshirt Senior; 32 Liam Cogswell - Freshman

=== Coaching staff ===
2020 Tulane Green Wave coaching staff
- Travis Jewett – Head Coach – 4th year
- Jay Uhlman – Assistant Coach – 1st year
- Daniel Latham – Assistant Coach – 2nd year
- Anthony Izzio – Assistant Coach – 1st year
- Curtis Akey – Director of Baseball Operations

== Schedule and results ==
Legend
	Tulane win
	Tulane loss
	Postponement/Cancelation/Suspensions
**Bold**	Tulane team member

2020 Tulane Green Wave baseball game log
Regular season (15–2)

February (8–2)
Date	Opponent	Rank	Site/stadium	Score	Win	Loss	Save	TV	Attendance	Overall record	SBC record
Feb. 14	Florida Gulf Coast		Greer Field at Turchin Stadium • New Orleans, LA	**W** 4-3	**Olthoff** (1–0)	Shuck (0–1)	**Gillies** (1)		1,430	1-0	
Feb. 15	Florida Gulf Coast		Greer Field at Turchin Park • New Orleans, LA	**W** 8-4	**Aldrich** (1–0)	McGarry (0–1)	None		1,528	2-0	
Feb. 16	Florida Gulf Coast		Greer Field at Turchin Park • New Orleans, LA	**W** 6-1	**Benoit** (1–0)	Gallo (0–1)	None		1,219	3-0	
Feb. 19	at Louisiana		M. L. Tigue Moore Field at Russo Park • Lafayette, LA	**W** 9-6	**Jannetta** (1–0)	Batty (0–1)	**Gillies** (2)		4,540	4-0	
Feb. 21	at No. 24 Cal State Fullerton		Goodwin Field • Fullerton, CA	**W** 1-0	**Olthoff** (2–0)	Bibee (1-1)	None		1,833	5-0	
Feb. 22	at No. 24 Cal State Fullerton		Goodwin Field • Fullerton, CA	**L** 5-7	Adolphus (1–0)	**Gillies** (0–1)	Weisberg (1)		1,229	5-1	
Feb. 23	at No. 24 Cal State Fullerton		Goodwin Field • Fullerton, CA	**W** 6-4 (13 inn.)	**Jannetta** (2–0)	Brown (0–1)	**Johnson** (1)		1,205	6-1	
Feb. 26	New Orleans		Greer Field at Turchin Park • New Orleans, LA	**L** 1-10	Mitchell (2–0)	**Holcomb** (0–1)	None		1,486	6-2	
Feb. 28	Middle Tennessee		Greer Field at Turchin Park • New Orleans, LA	**W** 2-0	**Olthoff** (3–0)	Brown (1–2)	**Gillies** (3)		1,368	7-2	
Feb. 29	Middle Tennessee		Greer Field at Turchin Park • New Orleans, LA	**W** 8-5	**Gillies** (1-1)	Armstrong (0–1)	None		1,582	8-2	

March (7–0)
Date	Opponent	Rank	Site/stadium	Score	Win	Loss	Save	TV	Attendance	Overall record	SBC record
Mar. 1	Middle Tennessee		Greer Field at Turchin Park • New Orleans, LA	**W** 11-7	**Segar** (1–0)	Medlin (1–2)	**Slagel** (1)		1,495	9-2	
Mar. 3	at Texas Southern	No. 23	Greer Field at Turchin Park • New Orleans, LA	**W** 18-2	**Jannetta** (3–0)	Kindervater (0–3)	None		1,151	10-2	
Mar. 6	Southern	No. 23	Greer Field at Turchin Park • New Orleans, LA	**W** 16-2	**Olthoff** (4–0)	Wilhelm (1–2)	None		1,745	11-2	
Mar. 7	at Southern	No. 23	Lee–Hines Field • Baton Rouge, LA	**W** 7-0	**Aldrich** (2–0)	Smith (0–1)	**Jannetta** (1)		578	12-2	
Mar. 8	Southern	No. 23	Greer Field at Turchin Park • New Orleans, LA	**W** 10-2	**Benoit** (2–0)	Battaglia (1-1)	None		1,802	13-2	
Mar. 10	Lamar	No. 20	Greer Field at Turchin Park • New Orleans, LA	**W** 14-12	**Holcomb** (1-1)	Buckendorff (0–1)	**Gillies** (4)	CST	1,418	14-2	
Mar. 11	Lamar	No. 20	Greer Field at Turchin Park • New Orleans, LA	**W** 6-3	**Johnson** (1–0)	Mize (1–2)	**Bates** (1)		1,311	15-2	
Mar. 13	No. 16 Long Beach State	No. 20	Greer Field at Turchin Park • New Orleans, LA	Season canceled by AAC due to COVID-19 pandemic							
Mar. 14	No. 16 Long Beach State	No. 20	Greer Field at Turchin Park • New Orleans, LA	Season canceled by AAC due to COVID-19 pandemic							
Mar. 15	No. 16 Long Beach State	No. 20	Greer Field at Turchin Park • New Orleans, LA	Season canceled by AAC due to COVID-19 pandemic							
Mar. 18	at South Alabama	No. 20	Eddie Stankey Field • Mobile, AL	Season canceled by AAC due to COVID-19 pandemic							
Mar. 20	at No. 22 Dallas Baptist	No. 20	Homer Ballpark • Dallas, TX	Season canceled by AAC due to COVID-19 pandemic							
Mar. 21	at No. 22 Dallas Baptist	No. 20	Homer Ballpark • Dallas, TX	Season canceled by AAC due to COVID-19 pandemic							
Mar. 22	at No. 22 Dallas Baptist	No. 20	Homer Ballpark • Dallas, TX	Season canceled by AAC due to COVID-19 pandemic							
Mar. 24	at No. 19 LSU	No. 20	Alex Box Stadium, Skip Bertman Field • Baton Rouge, LA	Season canceled by AAC due to COVID-19 pandemic							
Mar. 27	at Wichita State	No. 20	Eck Stadium • Wichita, KS	Season canceled by AAC due to COVID-19 pandemic							
Mar. 28	at Wichita State	No. 20	Eck Stadium • Wichita, KS	Season canceled by AAC due to COVID-19 pandemic							
Mar. 29	at Wichita State	No. 20	Eck Stadium • Wichita, KS	Season canceled by AAC due to COVID-19 pandemic							

April (0-0)
Date	Opponent	Rank	Site/stadium	Score	Win	Loss	Save	TV	Attendance	Overall record	SBC record
Apr. 1	Louisiana	No. 20	Greer Field at Turchin Stadium • New Orleans, LA	Season canceled by AAC due to COVID-19 pandemic							
Apr. 3	Houston	No. 20	Greer Field at Turchin Park • New Orleans, LA	Season canceled by AAC due to COVID-19 pandemic							
Apr. 4	Houston	No. 20	Greer Field at Turchin Park • New Orleans, LA	Season canceled by AAC due to COVID-19 pandemic							
Apr. 5	Houston	No. 20	Greer Field at Turchin Park • New Orleans, LA	Season canceled by AAC due to COVID-19 pandemic							
Apr. 7	at Southeastern Louisiana	No. 20	Pat Kenelly Diamond at Alumni Field • Hammond, LA	Season canceled by AAC due to COVID-19 pandemic							
Apr. 9	Memphis	No. 20	Greer Field at Turchin Park • New Orleans, LA	Season canceled by AAC due to COVID-19 pandemic							
Apr. 10	Memphis	No. 20	Greer Field at Turchin Park • New Orleans, LA	Season canceled by AAC due to COVID-19 pandemic							
Apr. 11	Memphis	No. 20	Greer Field at Turchin Park • New Orleans, LA	Season canceled by AAC due to COVID-19 pandemic							
Apr. 15	at New Orleans	No. 20	Maestri Field at Privateer Park • New Orleans, LA	Season canceled by AAC due to COVID-19 pandemic							
Apr. 17	at South Florida	No. 20	USF Baseball Stadium • Tampa, FL	Season canceled by AAC due to COVID-19 pandemic							
Apr. 18	at South Florida	No. 20	USF Baseball Stadium • Tampa, FL	Season canceled by AAC due to COVID-19 pandemic							
Apr. 19	at South Florida	No. 20	USF Baseball Stadium • Tampa, FL	Season canceled by AAC due to COVID-19 pandemic							
Apr. 21	New Orleans	No. 20	Greer Field at Turchin Park • New Orleans, LA	Season canceled by AAC due to COVID-19 pandemic							
Apr. 22	Southeastern Louisiana	No. 20	Greer Field at Turchin Park • New Orleans, LA	Season canceled by AAC due to COVID-19 pandemic							
Apr. 24	at No. 12 UCF	No. 20	John Euliano Park • Orlando, FL	Season canceled by AAC due to COVID-19 pandemic							
Apr. 25	at No. 12 UCF	No. 20	John Euliano Park • Orlando, FL	Season canceled by AAC due to COVID-19 pandemic							
Apr. 26	at No. 12 UCF	No. 20	John Euliano Park • Orlando, FL	Season canceled by AAC due to COVID-19 pandemic							
Apr. 29	at Nicholls	No. 20	Ben Meyer Diamond at Ray E. Didier Field • Thibodaux, LA	Season canceled by AAC due to COVID-19 pandemic							

May (0–0)
Date	Opponent	Rank	Site/stadium	Score	Win	Loss	Save	TV	Attendance	Overall record	SBC record
May 1	Cincinnati	No. 20	Greer Field at Turchin Park • New Orleans, LA	Season canceled by AAC due to COVID-19 pandemic							
May 2	Cincinnati	No. 20	Greer Field at Turchin Park • New Orleans, LA	Season canceled by AAC due to COVID-19 pandemic							
May 3	Cincinnati	No. 20	Greer Field at Turchin Park • New Orleans, LA	Season canceled by AAC due to COVID-19 pandemic							
May 6	Nicholls	No. 20	Greer Field at Turchin Park • New Orleans, LA	Season canceled by AAC due to COVID-19 pandemic							
May 8	East Carolina	No. 20	Greer Field at Turchin Park • New Orleans, LA	Season canceled by AAC due to COVID-19 pandemic							
May 9	East Carolina	No. 20	Greer Field at Turchin Park • New Orleans, LA	Season canceled by AAC due to COVID-19 pandemic							
May 10	East Carolina	No. 20	Greer Field at Turchin Park • New Orleans, LA	Season canceled by AAC due to COVID-19 pandemic							
May 14	at UConn	No. 2	Elliot Ballpark • Storrs, CT	Season canceled by AAC due to COVID-19 pandemic							
May 15	at UConn	No. 20	Elliot Ballpark • Storrs, CT	Season canceled by AAC due to COVID-19 pandemic							
May 16	at UConn	No. 20	Elliot Ballpark • Storrs, CT	Season canceled by AAC due to COVID-19 pandemic							

Postseason (0–0)

AAC Tournament (0–0)
Date	Opponent	Seed/Rank	Site/stadium	Score	Win	Loss	Save	TV	Attendance	Overall record	SBC record
May 19–24		No. 20	Spectrum Field • Clearwater, FL	Championship Series canceled by AAC due to COVID-19 pandemic							

Schedule source:

*Rankings are based on the team's current ranking in the D1Baseball poll.
