= 2020 Northwestern State Demons baseball team =

American college baseball season

2020 Northwestern State Demons baseball
- Conference: Southland Conference
- Record: 12–4 (2–1 SLC)
- Head coach: Bobby Barbier (4th season)
- Assistant coaches: Chris Bertrand; Taylor Dugas
- Home stadium: H. Alvin Brown–C. C. Stroud Field

2020 Southland Conference baseball standings
| | Conf. | | | | Overall |
| Team | W | | L | PCT | W | | L | PCT |
|---|---|---|---|---|---|---|---|---|
| Stephen F. Austin ‍‍‍ | 3 | – | 0 | 1.000 | 6 | – | 10 | .375 |
| Northwestern State ‍‍‍ | 2 | – | 1 | .667 | 12 | – | 4 | .750 |
| New Orleans ‍‍‍ | 2 | – | 1 | .667 | 11 | – | 6 | .647 |
| Central Arkansas ‍‍‍ | 2 | – | 1 | .667 | 8 | – | 8 | .500 |
| Texas A&M–Corpus Christi ‍‍‍ | 2 | – | 1 | .667 | 8 | – | 10 | .444 |
| Houston Baptist ‍‍‍ | 2 | – | 1 | .667 | 6 | – | 11 | .353 |
| Incarnate Word ‍‍‍ | 1 | – | 2 | .333 | 9 | – | 7 | .563 |
| Nicholls ‍‍‍ | 1 | – | 2 | .333 | 10 | – | 8 | .556 |
| Sam Houston State ‍‍‍ | 1 | – | 2 | .333 | 7 | – | 7 | .500 |
| Abilene Christian ‍‍‍ | 1 | – | 2 | .333 | 7 | – | 8 | .467 |
| Southeastern Louisiana ‍‍‍ | 1 | – | 2 | .333 | 6 | – | 10 | .375 |
| McNeese State ‍‍‍ | 0 | – | 0 | – | 10 | – | 7 | .588 |
| Lamar ‍‍‍ | 0 | – | 3 | .000 | 7 | – | 10 | .412 |
‡ – Tournament champion Rankings from D1Baseball

The 2020 Northwestern State Demons baseball team represented Northwestern State University in the 2020 NCAA Division I baseball season. They competed at the NCAA Division I level as members of the Southland Conference. The Demons played their home games at H. Alvin Brown–C. C. Stroud Field in Natchitoches, Louisiana. The Demons compiled an overall record of 12–4 (2–1 SLC) before the season was cancelled due to the COVID-19 pandemic.

== Schedule ==
2020 Northwestern State Demons baseball game log
Regular season
February

| # | Date | Opponent | Venue | Score | Overall record | SLC record |
|---|---|---|---|---|---|---|
| 1 | February 14 | Wichita State* | H. Alvin Brown–C. C. Stroud Field • Natchitoches, LA | W 11–0 | 1–0 | |
| 2 | February 15 | Wichita State* | H. Alvin Brown–C. C. Stroud Field • Natchitoches, LA | L 1–5 | 1–1 | |
| 3 | February 16 | Wichita State* | H. Alvin Brown–C. C. Stroud Field • Natchitoches, LA | W 3–2 | 2–1 | |
| 4 | February 21 | North Alabama | H. Alvin Brown–C. C. Stroud Field • Natchitoches, LA | W 8–2 | 3–1 | |
| 5 | February 22 | North Alabama | H. Alvin Brown–C. C. Stroud Field • Natchitoches, LA | W 4–3 | 4–1 | |
| 6 | February 22 | North Alabama | H. Alvin Brown–C. C. Stroud Field • Natchitoches, LA | W 5–0 | 5–1 | |
| 7 | February 23 | North Alabama | H. Alvin Brown–C. C. Stroud Field • Natchitoches, LA | W 8–3 | 6–1 | |
| 8 | February 26 | at Louisiana | M. L. Tigue Moore Field at Russo Park • Lafayette, LA | W 10–8 | 7–1 | |
| 9 | February 28 | Eastern Illinois | H. Alvin Brown–C. C. Stroud Field • Natchitoches, LA | W 3–0 | 8–1 | |
| 10 | February 29 | Eastern Illinois | H. Alvin Brown–C. C. Stroud Field • Natchitoches, LA | L 1–5 | 8–2 | |

March

| # | Date | Opponent | Venue | Score | Overall record | SLC record |
|---|---|---|---|---|---|---|
| 11 | March 1 | Eastern Illinois | H. Alvin Brown–C. C. Stroud Field • Natchitoches, LA | W 6–3 | 9–2 | |
| 12 | March 3 | at Southern | Lee–Hines Field • Baton Rouge, LA | L 7–8 (10 inn) | 9–3 | |
| 13 | March 6 | Abilene Christian | H. Alvin Brown–C. C. Stroud Field • Natchitoches, LA | W 7–1 | 10–3 | 1–0 |
| 14 | March 7 | Abilene Christian | H. Alvin Brown–C. C. Stroud Field • Natchitoches, LA | L 2–8 | 10–4 | 1–1 |
| 15 | March 8 | Abilene Christian | H. Alvin Brown–C. C. Stroud Field • Natchitoches, LA | W 8–3 | 11–4 | 2–1 |
| 16 | March 10 | Grambling | Wilbert Ellis Field at Ralph Waldo Emerson Jones Park • Grambling, LA | W 4-1 | 12–4 | |
