= Rick Jones (baseball coach) =

American baseball coach

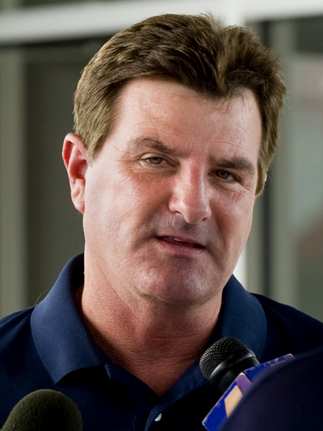
- Jones in 2008

Biographical details
- Born: Bennett, North Carolina, U.S.

Playing career
- 1972–1973: Sandhills CC
- 1974–1975: UNC Wilmington
- Position: Pitcher

Coaching career (HC unless noted)
- 1982–1984: Ferrum College
- 1985–1989: Elon
- 1990–1993: Georgia Tech (Asst.)
- 1994–2014: Tulane

Head coaching record
- Overall: 1,094–538–3
- Tournaments: C-USA: 39–23; NCAA: 28–26

Accomplishments and honors

Championships
- Carolina Conference Regular season (1985, 1987, 1989); Conference USA Regular season (1997, 1998, 2001, 2005); Conference USA Tournament (1996, 1998, 1999, 2001, 2005)

Awards
- Carolina Conference Coach of the Year (1985, 1987, 1989); Conference USA Coach of the Year (1997, 2001, 2005); Baseball America National Coach of the Year (2005)

Rick Jones is an American college baseball coach who most recently served as the head coach of the Tulane Green Wave baseball team. He held that position for 21 seasons – from 1994 to 2014.

Early in his coaching career, Jones coached at Ferrum College, while it was an NJCAA member, and at Elon College, while it was an NAIA member.

Jones led the Green Wave to 12 NCAA tournament appearances. In 2001 his team advanced to the College World Series for the first time in school history. In 2005, he again led his team to the CWS, this time as the overall #1 seed in the tournament. Jones' Green Wave teams won four Conference USA regular-season championships (1997, 1998, 2001, 2005) and five Conference USA tournament championships (1996, 1998, 1999, 2001, 2005).

His 814 career wins were the most tallied by any Tulane coach in any sport. Jones has been inducted into Tulane’s athletics Hall of Fame, the Greater New Orleans Sports Hall of Fame and the Louisiana Sports Hall of Fame. In 2023, Tulane baseball retired his uniform number.

== Head coaching records ==
Record table
Season	Team	Overall	Conference	Standing	Postseason
Tulane Green Wave (Metro Conference) (1994–1995)
1994	Tulane	41–24	10–8	4th	NCAA Regional
1995	Tulane	32–26	8–10	5th	
Tulane Green Wave (Conference USA) (1996–2014)
1996	Tulane	43–20	18–6	2nd	NCAA Regional
1997	Tulane	40–21	19–7	1st	
1998	Tulane	48–15	22–5	1st	NCAA Regional
1999	Tulane	48–17	19–8	2nd	NCAA Regional
2000	Tulane	38–22–1	20–6–1	2nd	NCAA Regional
2001	Tulane	56–13	21–6	1st	College World Series
2002	Tulane	36–27	17–13	5th	NCAA Regional
2003	Tulane	44–19	20–10	3rd	NCAA Regional
2004	Tulane	41–21	21–9	t-2nd	NCAA Super Regional
2005	Tulane	56–12	24–6	1st	College World Series
2006	Tulane	43–21	15–9	3rd	NCAA Regional
2007	Tulane	34–26	9–15	7th	
2008	Tulane	39–22–1	13–9–1	3rd	NCAA Regional
2009	Tulane	34–24	13–11	t-3rd	
2010	Tulane	32–24	10–14	t-8th	
2011	Tulane	31–26	10–14	7th	
2012	Tulane	38–20	14–10	t-3rd	
2013	Tulane	30–28	11–13	7th	
2014	Tulane	23–29	10–18	10th	
Tulane:		827–457–2	324–207–2		
Total:		1,094–538–3			
National champion Postseason invitational champion Conference regular season champion Conference regular season and conference tournament champion Division regular season champion Division regular season and conference tournament champion Conference tournament champion
