= Elliot Ballpark =

Baseball park at the University of Connecticut

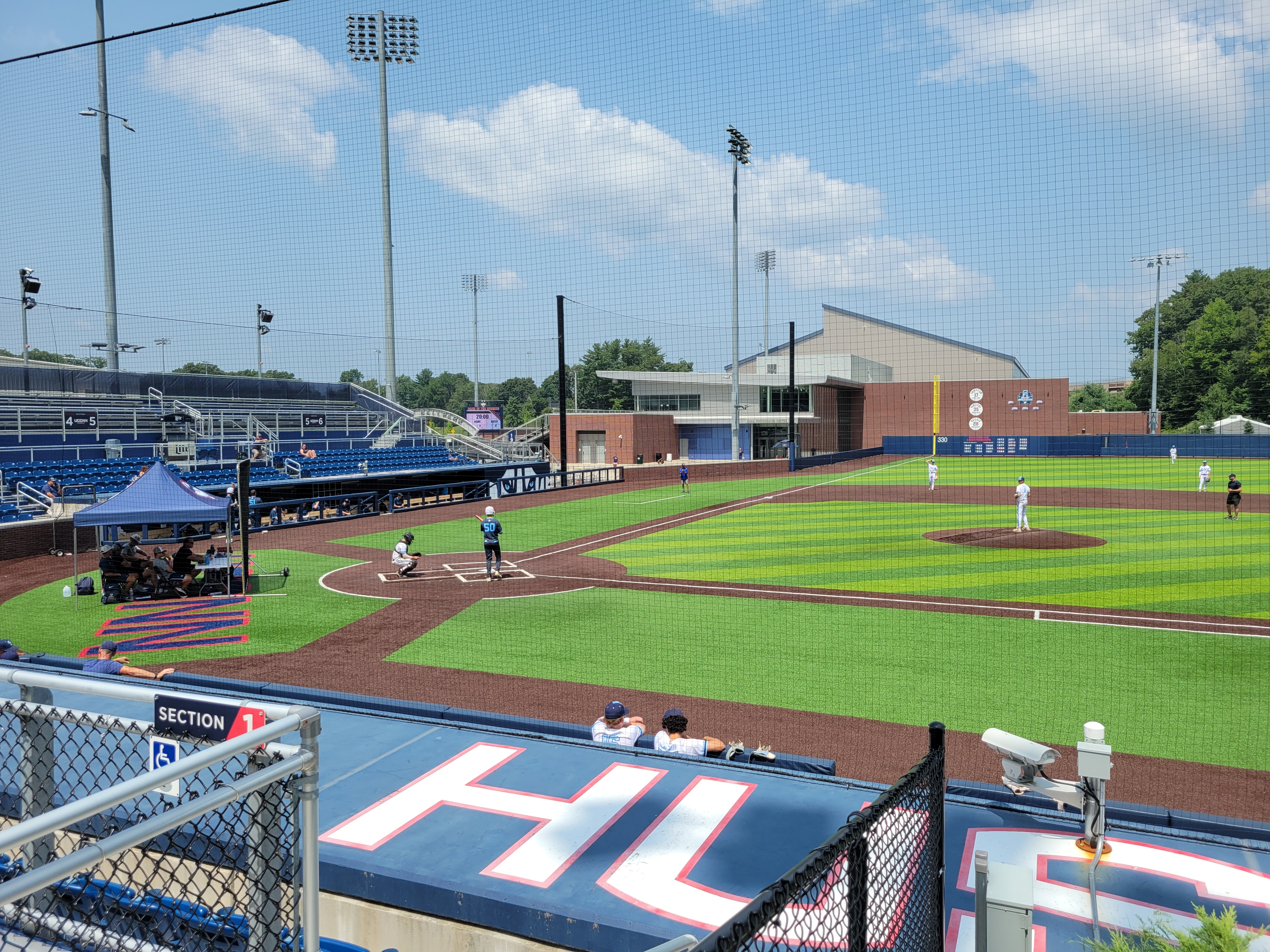
- Elliot Ballpark infield

- Location within Connecticut Location within the United States
- Interactive map of Elliot Ballpark
- Location: Jim Calhoun Way east of Separatist Road, Storrs, Connecticut, USA
- Coordinates: 41.800728°N 72.253796°W
- Owner: University of Connecticut
- Operator: University of Connecticut
- Capacity: 1,500 (1,351 seated)
- Surface: AstroTurf OPS (artificial turf)
- Field size: Left field: 330 feet (100 m); Center field: 400 feet (120 m); Right field: 330 feet (100 m)

Construction
- Opened: March 23, 2021

Tenants
- UConn (NCAA, Big East) 2021–present

Website
- uconnhuskies.com/facilities/elliot-ballpark/7

Elliot Ballpark is a baseball stadium on the campus of the University of Connecticut (UConn) in Storrs, Connecticut, United States. It is the home field of the UConn Huskies baseball team of NCAA Division I's Big East Conference. The stadium is designed to seat 1,500 people, with additional space on grass berms which can also accommodate temporary bleachers. It is named after former UConn baseball player Doug Elliot and his family, who provided a major gift toward the construction of the venue.

Elliot Ballpark replaced J. O. Christian Field as UConn's home field. The stadium was set to open during the 2020 season, however, UConn played no home games prior to the cancellation of the season due to the coronavirus pandemic. The first game at the ballpark was played on March 23, 2021, with UConn defeating Central Connecticut State by a score of 2-0.

== See also ==
- List of NCAA Division I baseball venues
