= 2019 American Athletic Conference baseball tournament =

American college baseball tournament

- Teams: 8
- Format: Double-elimination tournament
- Finals site: Spectrum Field; Clearwater, FL
- Champions: Cincinnati (1st title)
- Winning coach: Scott Googins (1st title)
- MVP: A.J. Bumpass (Cincinnati)
- Television: American Digital Network (Tues-Sat); ESPNews (Championship)

2019 American Athletic Conference baseball standings
	Conf.				Overall
Team	W		L	PCT	W		L	PCT
No. 13 East Carolina ‍†‍‍^{y}	20	–	4	.833	47	–	18	.723
Cincinnati ‍‍‡‍^{y}	13	–	11	.542	31	–	31	.500
Tulane ‍‍‍	12	–	11	.522	32	–	26	.552
UConn ‍‍‍^{y}	12	–	12	.500	39	–	25	.609
Houston ‍‍‍	12	–	12	.500	32	–	24	.571
UCF ‍‍‍	11	–	13	.458	36	–	22	.621
Memphis ‍‍‍	10	–	13	.435	27	–	28	.491
Wichita State ‍‍‍	9	–	15	.375	28	–	31	.475
South Florida ‍‍‍	8	–	16	.333	26	–	27	.491
† – Conference champion ‡ – Tournament champion y – Invited to the NCAA tournament As of July 16, 2019; Rankings from D1Baseball

The 2019 American Athletic Conference baseball tournament was held at Spectrum Field in Clearwater, Florida, from May 21 through 26. The event, held at the end of the conference regular season, determined the champion of the American Athletic Conference for the 2019 season. The winner of the double-elimination tournament, Cincinnati, received the conference's automatic bid to the 2019 NCAA Division I baseball tournament.

== Format and seeding ==
The top eight baseball teams in The American were seeded based on their records in conference play. The tournament used a two bracket double-elimination format, leading to a single championship game between the winners of each bracket.

Team	W	L	Pct.	Seed	Tiebreaker
East Carolina	20	4	.833	1	
Cincinnati	13	11	.542	2	
Tulane	12	11	.522	3	
UConn	12	12	.500	4	2–1 vs Houston
Houston	12	12	.500	5	1–2 vs UConn
UCF	11	13	.458	6	
Memphis	10	13	.435	7	
Wichita State	9	15	.375	8	
South Florida	8	16	.333		

== Bracket ==
First round
1	East Carolina	2
8	Wichita State	6
4	UConn	4
5	Houston	3
1	East Carolina	13
5	Houston	2
2	Cincinnati	11
7	Memphis	6
3	Tulane	5
6	UCF	2
7	Memphis	7
6	UCF	8^{10}

Second round
8	Wichita State	7
4	UConn	9
1	East Carolina	5
8	Wichita State	12
2	Cincinnati	8
3	Tulane	4
6	UCF	6
3	Tulane	2

Semifinals
4	UConn	8	—
8	Wichita State	3	—
2	Cincinnati	10	–
6	UCF	6	–

Finals
4	UConn	5
2	Cincinnati	22

== Conference championship ==
American Athletic Conference Championship
(2) Cincinnati Bearcats	vs.	(4) UConn Huskies

May 26, 2019, 12:00 p.m. (EDT) at Spectrum Field in Clearwater, Florida
Team	1	2	3	4	5	6	7	8	9	R	H	E
(2) Cincinnati	0	1	5	3	0	1	9	0	3	22	24	0
(4) UConn	0	1	2	0	1	0	0	0	1	5	9	1
WP: Garrett Schoenle (4–1) LP: Jeff Kersten (5–4); Home runs: CINCY: Mitch Holding; Joey Bellini; Jace Mercer; A. J. Bumpass; CONN: None; Attendance: 822
