= Tulane Green Wave baseball =

College baseball team

- 2026 Tulane Green Wave baseball team
- Founded: 1893; 133 years ago
- University: Tulane University
- Head coach: Jay Uhlman (4th season)
- Conference: The American
- Location: New Orleans, Louisiana
- Home stadium: Greer Field at Turchin Stadium (capacity: 5,000)
- Nickname: Green Wave, Slugger Birds
- Colors: Olive green and sky blue

College World Series appearances
- 2001, 2005

NCAA regional champions
- 2001, 2004, 2005

NCAA tournament appearances
- 1979, 1982, 1983, 1986, 1987, 1988, 1992, 1994, 1996, 1998, 1999, 2000, 2001, 2002, 2003, 2004, 2005, 2006, 2008, 2015, 2016, 2023, 2024

Conference tournament champions
- Metro Conference: 1979, 1982, 1992 Conference USA: 1996, 1998, 1999, 2001, 2005 American Athletic Conference: 2023, 2024

Conference regular season champions
- Southeastern Conference: 1948 Metro Conference: 1983 Conference USA: 1997, 1998, 2001, 2005 American Athletic Conference: 2016

The Tulane Green Wave baseball team represents Tulane University in NCAA Division I college baseball. The Green Wave baseball team competes in the American Conference and play their home games on campus at Greer Field at Turchin Stadium. They are coached by head coach Jay Uhlman.

Tulane has captured 17 conference championships in three different leagues and have made 23 NCAA Regional Appearances, including three Super Regionals and two trips to the Men's College World Series.

== History ==
=== By the numbers ===
- 131 - MLB Draft Picks
- 57 - All Americans
- 30 - MLB players
- 17 - Conference Championships
- 10 - 1st Round draft picks
- 23 - NCAA Regional appearances
- 3 - NCAA Super Regional Appearances
- 2 - Men's College World Series appearances

=== Early years (1893–1946) ===
Tulane played its first game during the 1893 season. It was a 10–2 victory over the Southern Athletic Club.

=== Early Modern era (1947–1974) ===
During this era, Tulane won the 1948 SEC championship. Tulane left the SEC after the 1966 season. The school's final SEC season marked a milestone in racial integration in the South when Stephen Martin, a walk-on who was attending the school on an academic scholarship, became the first African American to play any varsity sport in the SEC.

=== Joe Brockhoff era (1975–1993) ===
Under Joe Brockhoff, Tulane made seven NCAA tournament appearances. His teams won one regular season and three tournament Metro Conference championships. Brockhoff finished with an overall record of 641–350–2 (.647) in his 19 seasons as head baseball coach.

=== Rick Jones era (1994–2014) ===
Rick Jones was hired as head baseball coach at Tulane in 1994. In 1996, Tulane played its first season as a founding member of Conference USA.

In 2001, the team's 55 wins set a school record and led the nation. The team made it to the College World Series in Omaha, only to blow an 8–0 lead against Stanford University and lose the game 13–11. The Green Wave won its next game against Nebraska 6–5 but was eliminated in the third game by Cal State Fullerton.

In 2005, the Green Wave tied its 2001 record for wins. Tulane started the season ranked first in the nation and held the top spot throughout most of the regular season. The Green Wave entered the postseason ranked No. 1 and beat Rice to win its Super Regional. Tulane advanced to the College World Series for the second time in school history. The Green Wave defeated Oregon State 3–1 in its first game but fell 5–0 to Texas, the eventual national champion. In an elimination game against Baylor, the Green Wave led 7–0 in the 7th inning before the Bears scored 8 runs in the final three innings to win the game. Brian Bogusevic won Louisiana Pitcher of the Year, was named to four All-American teams (including Louisville Slugger's first team), and was a semifinalist for three national awards. He was taken in the first round of the 2005 draft by the Houston Astros. Pitcher and first baseman Micah Owings was named Conference USA and Louisiana Player of the Year. He was drafted in the third round by the Arizona Diamondbacks. Third baseman Brad Emaus was named Conference USA and Louisiana Freshman of the Year. Head Coach Rick Jones was named Louisiana Coach of the Year.

In 2006, the Tulane baseball team returned to New Orleans after spending the fall semester at Texas Tech University in Lubbock, Texas, due to the effects of Hurricane Katrina. With the renovation of Turchin Stadium delayed, the Green Wave were forced to play home games at nearby Zephyr Field for 2 seasons. Despite the distractions and disruptions of their day-to-day lives, the Green Wave finished the regular season 39–17, in third place in C-USA with a 15–9 conference record. Tulane lost to Ole Miss in the NCAA Regionals to end the season.

The university's Renewal Plan called for the suspension of some of its sports, and Tulane Athletics did not return to a full 16 teams until the 2011–12 school year.

Prior to the 2007 season the Green Wave was recognized by Baseball America as one of the top college baseball programs in the country since the NCAA expanded its tournament from 48 to 64 teams. The ratings were formulated by evaluating a program's national impact, overall competitiveness, fans and facilities, and academics. The Wave received an "A" rating, one of only 16 teams so designated.

Greer Field at Turchin Stadium viewed from Ben Weiner Drive

The 2007 season saw the long-term effects of Hurricane Katrina finally wear on the team. With construction underway on the new Turchin Stadium, the Wave played a second straight season at Zephyr Field. A solid 28–11 start to the season (including a sweep of in-state rival LSU) was followed by a 6–15 limp to the finish line. The Green Wave failed to garner an NCAA bid for the first time since 1997.

In 2010, the NCAA named Tulane the 17th winningest team of the 2000s in terms of winning percentage and 16th by overall wins.

Due to health concerns in his 21st season as head coach, Rick Jones stepped down temporarily, handing over control of the 2014 team to recruiting coordinator and hitting coach Jake Gautreau. He was replaced by David Pierce. Jones finished with an overall record of 726–401–2 (.644) during his tenure as head coach for the Green Wave.

=== David Pierce era (2015–2016) ===
In his first year at Tulane in 2015, David Pierce brought the Green Wave back to postseason play for the first time since 2008. In 2016, he improved on that and Tulane won the American Conference championship. On June 29, 2016, Pierce left the Green Wave baseball program for the Texas Longhorns. He was only the third coach to lead Tulane to an NCAA appearance.

=== Travis Jewett era (2017–2022) ===
On July 14, 2016, Tulane hired Travis Jewett as head coach after a previous stint as an assistant coach at Vanderbilt.

On May 16, 2022, Tulane and Jewett agreed to mutually part ways effective immediately. Jay Uhlman was named interim head coach.

=== Jay Uhlman era (2022–present) ===
On June 7, 2022, Tulane hired Jay Uhlman as head coach. He led Tulane back to the NCAA Regionals for the first time since 2016, joining Rick Jones and David Pierce as the only coaches to do so in their first seasons at Tulane. The Wave did it in unconventional fashion, going 15–39 in the regular season but won the American Conference Tournament (first since 2005) over East Carolina to make the NCAA tournament in Baton Rouge. He is only the 4th coach in Tulane history to take his team to the NCAA Tournament.

== Traditions ==
=== Logo and uniforms ===
Tulane Baseball is widely regarded year in and year out as having one of the best logos and uniforms in college baseball. Their jerseys feature two pelicans, Louisiana's state bird, perched on a baseball bat in the style of the St. Louis Cardinals logo. Throughout the years, multiple publications and fans have voted the Green Wave jerseys as having the #1 Logo and Uniform in college baseball, and as recently as 2016 the NCAA named it one of the top nine in the country.

Tulane's "birds on the bat" logo pays homage to the New Orleans Pelicans, a former minor league baseball team in New Orleans whose logo also borrowed from their parent club, the St. Louis Cardinals.

Tulane has worn multiple color combinations throughout the years that include the following: olive green, sky blue, cream, white, gray, black, and padre style camo jerseys, all donning the famous Tulane "birds on the bat" logo. The baseball cap insignia features either the school's "Angry Wave" logo or the "Slugger Bird".

== Stadium ==
The Green Wave have played its home games at Greer Field at Turchin Stadium since 1991. The team has a .750 winning percentage in games played there and consistently ranks highly among Division I baseball programs in average attendance figures. In 2008 the Green Wave returned to a brand-new Greer Field at Turchin Stadium, nearly rebuilt at the site of the old stadium after damage from Katrina forced the municipality to go with a much larger construction project. The new stadium expanded seating to 5,000, including four luxury box suites and a partially covered seating area with 2,700 chairback seats.

== Tulane in the NCAA tournament ==
- The NCAA Division I baseball tournament started in 1947. The format of the tournament has changed through the years.

Year	Record	Pct	Notes
1979	0–2	.000	
1982	1–2	.333	
1983	1–2	.333	
1986	3–2	.600	
1987	0–2	.000	
1988	1–2	.333	
1992	1–2	.333	
1994	1–2	.333	
1996	1–2	.333	
1998	1–2	.333	
1999	3–2	.600	
2000	1–2	.333	
2001	6–3	.667	5th place at the 2001 College World Series
2002	1–2	.333	
2003	1–2	.333	
2004	3–2	.600	
2005	6–3	.667	5th place at the 2005 College World Series
2006	2–2	.500	
2008	2–2	.500	
2015	1–2	.333	
2016	2–2	.500	
2023	0–2	.000	
2024	1–2	.333	
Total	39–48	.448	

== Notable players ==
=== Retired numbers ===
The Tulane baseball program has retired four numbers in the school's history. One player, a player/coach and two coaching legends each have their names and numbers immortalized inside Greer Field at Turchin Stadium. A trio of New Orleans natives are all enshrined in the Tulane Athletics Hall of Fame, with head coach Joe Brockhoff (East Jefferson High School), Cary D. Livingston (West Jefferson High School) and Milt Retif (Jesuit High School) all have their numbers hung on the facade inside the Green Wave's home stadium. The latest honoree was former Georgia Tech assistant Rick Jones who created an Omaha pedigree program during his tenure at Tulane. He took the 2001 and 2005 teams to Omaha, once as the number one overall national seed.

No.	Member	Position	Career
12	Cary D. Livingston	OF	1969–1972
27	Milt Retif	SS / Head Coach	1952–1955 / 1967–1974
25	Joe Brockhoff	Head Coach	1979–1993
10	Rick Jones	Head Coach	1994–2014

=== Other prominent former players ===
Andrew Friedman

- 3x World Series Champion
- GM of the Tampa Bay Rays 2004–2014
- 2008 MLB Executive of the Year
- President of Baseball Operations, Los Angeles Dodgers 2014–present

Bobby Brown

- 4x World Series Champion
- Cardiologist
- Texas Rangers-Executive Vice President
- President of the MLB American League (AL), 1984–1994
- Presented World Series Trophy in 1992 and 1993
- Last living member of 1947 New York Yankees World Series team

Brandon Gomes

- 2x World Series Champion
- Reliever for the Tampa Bay Rays 2011–2015
- General Manager Los Angeles Dodgers 2022–present

== Player awards ==
=== National award winners ===
- National Freshman of the Year

James Jurries (1999)
Michael Aubrey (2001)

- National Coach of the Year

Rick Jones (2005)

=== Conference award winners ===
- Conference USA All Decade Team (1996–2005)

Rick Jones - Coach of the Decade
Jake Gautreau - Player of the Decade
Michael Aubrey
James Jurries
Chad Sutter

- Conference USA Coach of the Year

Rick Jones (1997, 2001, 2005)

- Metro Conference Coach of the Year

Joe Brockhoff (1991)

- Conference USA Player of the Year

Chad Sutter (1999)
Jake Gautreau (2000, 2001)
James Jurries (2002)
Michael Aubrey (2003)
Micah Owings (2005)
Mark Hamilton (2006)

- American Athletic Conference Player of the Year

Hunter Williams (2017)
Kody Hoese (2019)

- Conference USA Pitcher of the Year

Jason Navarro (1997)
Josh Bobbitt (1998)
Shooter Hunt (2008)

- Metro Conference Pitcher of the Year

Ken Francingues (1979)

- Conference USA Freshman of the Year

Chad Sutter (1997)
James Jurries (1998)
Michael Aubrey (2001)
J.R. Crowel (2003)
Brad Emaus & Warren McFadden (2006)

- Metro Conference Freshman of the Year

Ivan Zweig (1991)

- NCAA Division I Regional Tournament MVP

Joey Charron (New Orleans, 2001)
Brian Bogusevic (Oxford, 2004)
Mark Hamilton (New Orleans, 2005)

- American Athletic Tournament MVP

Teo Banks (2023)
Jackson Linn (2024)

- Conference USA Tournament MVP

Jason Fitzgerald (1996)
Brian Hughes (1998)
Mickey McKee (1999)
Barth Melius (2001)
Nathan Southard (2005)

- Metro Conference Tournament MVP

Ken Francingues (1979)
Mike Romano (1992)

== Collegiate national team members ==
Over the last two decades, the Green Wave have been well represented on the nation's most elite team: USA Baseball's Collegiate National Team. Nine players/coaches have donned the red, white and blue uniform on eight occasions since Ivan Zweig became the first to represent Tulane as a member of Team USA in 1991.

Player/Coach	Position	Years at Tulane	Country	Year
Ivan Zweig	P	1991–1994	USA	1991
Chad Sutter**	C	1996–1999	USA	1996
James Jurries**	C	1999–2002	USA	1999
Jake Gautreau	3B	1999–2001	USA	2000
Michael Aubrey	1B	2001–2003	USA	2001 & 2002
Tony Giarratano	SS	2001–2003	USA	2001
Nick Pepitone	P	2008–2011	USA	2009
Rick Jones	HC	1994–2014	USA	2009
David Pierce	Asst.	2015–2016	USA	2016

"**"Indicates selected to team but did not participate due to injury

== Tulane and MLB ==
Player	Position	Debut	MLB years	Team(s)
Gerald Alexander	P	09/09/1990	1990–1993	TEX
Michael Aubrey	1B	05/17/2008	2008–2009	CLE, BAL
Brian Bogusevic	OF	09/01/2010	2010–2015	HOU, CHC, PHI
Bobby Brown	UT	09/22/1946	1946–1954	NYY
Andy Cannizaro	SS/3B	09/05/2006	2006–2008	NYY, TB
Preston Claiborne	P	05/05/2013	2013–2014	NYY
Jack Cressend	P	08/26/2000	2000–2004	MIN, CLE
Brad Emaus	2B	04/01/2011	2011	NYM
J.P. France	P	05/06/2023	2023–Present	HOU
Jim Gaudet	C	09/10/1978	1978–1979	KC
Tony Giarratano	SS	08/01/2005	2005	DET
Ian Gibaut	P	07/12/2019	2019–Present	TB, TEX, MIN, CLE, CIN
Brandon Gomes	P	05/03/2011	2011–2015	TB
Mark Hamilton	1B	09/20/2010	2010–2011	STL
Gene Harris	P	04/05/1989	1989–1995	MON, SEA, SD, DET, PHI, BAL
Carl Lind	2B/SS	09/14/1927	1927–1930	CLE
Aaron Loup	P	07/14/2012	2012–2023	TOR
Tommy Manzella	SS	09/08/2009	2009–2010	HOU
Kevin Mmahat	P	09/09/1989	1989	NYY
Eddie Morgan	1B/OF	04/11/1928	1928–1934	CLE, BOS
Steve Mura	P	09/05/1978	1978–1985	SD, STL, CHW, OAK
Micah Owings	P/PH	05/06/2007	2007–2012	ARI, CIN, SD
Josh Prince	OF/3B	040/6/2013	2013	MIL
Jake Rogers	C	07/30/2019	2019–present	DET
Mike Romano	P	09/05/1999	1999	TOR
Rob Segedin	3B, LF	08/07/2016	2016–2017	LAD
Andy Sheets	SS, 2B, 3B	04/22/1996	1996–2002	SEA, SD, ANA, BOS, TB
Chase Solesky	P	05/18/2026	2026–present	TB
Scott Williamson	P	04/05/1999	1999–2007	CIN, BOS, CHC, SD, BAL
Frank Wills	P	07/31/1983	1983–1991	KC, SEA, CLE, TOR
Josh Zeid	P	07/30/2013	2013–2014	HOU

=== By the numbers ===
- Tulane players in MLB, all-time = 31
- Most career home runs = 75 - Chad Sutter
- Most career strikeouts = 510 - Scott Williamson
- Highest draft pick to reach MLB = Michael Aubrey - 11th overall pick, 2003
- Lowest draft pick to reach MLB = Kevin Mmahat - 805th pick, 1987
- Free agents to reach MLB = 5
- Most Tulane MLB players in one season = 6 (2013)
- Longest stretch of Tulane in MLB = 1978–present

Front office in MLB

- Andrew Friedman, president of baseball operations (LAD)
- Brandon Gomes, general manager (LAD)

== See also ==
- List of NCAA Division I baseball programs
- Tulane Green Wave
