= Travis Jewett =

American baseball coach

Current position
- Title: Recruiting coordinator Hitting coach
- Team: USC
- Conference: Pac-12

Biographical details
- Born: June 1, 1984 (age 42); Tacoma, Washington, U.S.
- Education: Washington State University

Playing career
- 1990–1991: Lower Columbia College

Coaching career (HC unless noted)
- 1994: Tacoma Community College (Asst.)
- 1995–1996: Tacoma Community College
- 1997–1998: Edmonds Community College
- 1999–2001: Gonzaga (Asst.)
- 2002–2004: Washington (Asst.)
- 2005–2009: Washington State (Asst.)
- 2010–2012: Arizona State (Asst.)
- 2013–2016: Vanderbilt (Asst.)
- 2017–2022: Tulane
- 2023–present: USC (RC/H)

Head coaching record
- Overall: 160–138–1
- Tournaments: NCAA: 0–0

Travis Jewett (born June 1, 1984) is an American college baseball coach and former player who is the current hitting coach and recruiting coordinator for the USC Trojans. Jewett played college baseball for Lower Columbia College team while obtaining his associate degree. He completed his education at Washington State University, where he did not play baseball. He served as head coach of the Tulane Green Wave from 2017 to 2022.

== Playing career ==
Jewett played college baseball at Lower Columbia College during the 1990 and 1991 seasons.

== Coaching career ==
In 1994, Jewett joined the Tacoma Community College coaching staff. The following season he was named the head coach of Tacoma. In 1997, Jewett left to take the head coaching job at Edmonds Community College. He led the Tritons to the 1998 Northwest Athletic Conference title.

Jewett then went on to assist at Gonzaga, Washington, Washington State, Arizona State and Vanderbilt.

On July 14, 2016, Jewett was named head coach at Tulane. On May 16, 2022, Jewett agreed to part ways with Tulane, and Jay Ulhman was named the interim head coach for the remainder of the 2022 season. Jewett compiled a 160–136–1 record over his 6 years as head coach of the Green Wave.

On July 7, 2022, Jewett was named the hitting coach and recruiting coordinator for the USC Trojans.

== Head coaching record ==
Record table
Season	Team	Overall	Conference	Standing	Postseason
Tulane Green Wave (American Athletic Conference) (2017–2022)
2017	Tulane	27–31	13–11	5th	American Athletic Tournament
2018	Tulane	25–33	9–14	8th	American Athletic Tournament
2019	Tulane	32–26	12–11	3rd	American Athletic Tournament
2020	Tulane	15–2	0–0		Season canceled due to COVID-19
2021	Tulane	31–24	17–10	2nd	American Athletic Tournament
2022	Tulane	30–22–1	10–11		
Tulane:		160–138–1	61–57		
Total:		160–138–1			
National champion Postseason invitational champion Conference regular season champion Conference regular season and conference tournament champion Division regular season champion Division regular season and conference tournament champion Conference tournament champion

== See also ==
- List of current NCAA Division I baseball coaches
