= 2020 Texas Tech Red Raiders baseball team =

American college baseball season

2020 Texas Tech Red Raiders baseball
- Conference: Big 12 Conference

Ranking
- Coaches: No. 3
- CB: No. 7
- Record: 16–3 (0–0 Big 12)
- Head coach: Tim Tadlock (8th season)
- Assistant coaches: J-Bob Thomas (8th season); Matt Gardner (8th season); Eric Gutierrez (2nd season)
- Pitching coach: Ray Hayward (8th season)
- Home stadium: Dan Law Field at Rip Griffin Park

2020 Big 12 Conference baseball standings
	Conf.				Overall
Team	W		L	PCT	W		L	PCT
No. 3 Texas Tech ‍‍‍	0	–	0	–	16	–	3	.842
No. 22 Texas ‍‍‍	0	–	0	–	14	–	3	.824
No. 13 Oklahoma ‍‍‍	0	–	0	–	14	–	4	.778
TCU ‍‍‍	0	–	0	–	11	–	4	.733
Oklahoma State ‍‍‍	0	–	0	–	13	–	5	.722
West Virginia ‍‍‍	0	–	0	–	11	–	5	.688
Baylor ‍‍‍	0	–	0	–	10	–	6	.625
Kansas State ‍‍‍	0	–	0	–	10	–	7	.588
Kansas ‍‍‍	0	–	0	–	7	–	10	.412
‡ – Tournament champion As of March 15, 2020; Rankings from D1baseball

The 2020 Texas Tech Red Raiders baseball team represented Texas Tech University during the 2020 NCAA Division I baseball season. The Red Raiders played their home games at Dan Law Field at Rip Griffin Park as a member of the Big 12 Conference. The team was led by 8th year head coach Tim Tadlock. On March 12, the team announced the series against West Virginia would be postponed due to the coronavirus pandemic. A few days later it was announced that the remainder of the team's season would be cancelled.

== Previous season ==
The 2019 team finished the regular season with a 36–15 record (16–8 in conference play), finishing first in the Big 12. In the conference tournament, the team went 3–2 and were eliminated in game 5 by West Virginia. The Red Raiders finished the NCAA tournament 5–1, with their only loss being in game 5 against conference rival Oklahoma State. The team advanced to the College World Series, but lost 3–5 to Michigan in game 1. The Red Raiders defeated #5 Arkansas 5–4 in game 2 and defeated Florida State 4–1 in game 3. In game 4, Texas Tech was eliminated by Michigan in a lopsided 3–15 defeat. The team finished with an overall record of 46–20.

== Personnel ==
=== Roster ===
2020 Texas Tech Red Raiders roster
Pitchers: 10 - Mason Montgomery - Sophomore; 11 - Andrew Devine - Freshman; 17 - John McMillon - Senior; 25 - Conner Queen - Senior; 29 - Clayton Beeter - (redshirt) Sophomore; 31 - Austin Becker - Sophomore; 33 - Jakob Brustoski - Junior; 34 - Micah Dallas - Sophomore; 35 - Brandon Hendrix - Freshman; 38 - Tyler Hamilton - Freshman; 40 - Bryce Bonnin - Junior; 42 - Hunter Dobbins - Sophomore; 43 - Jon Barrera - Freshman; 46 - Riley Ramsey - Junior; 47 - Eli Riechmann - Sophomore; 49 - Ryan Sublette - Junior	Catchers: 16 - Bo Willis - Freshman; 26 - Braxton Fulford - Junior; Infielders: 2 - Jace Jung - Freshman; 3 - T. J. Rumfield - (redshirt) Freshman; 5 - Brian Klein - Senior; 13 - Cal Conley - (redshirt) Freshman; 14 - Jared Cushing - Freshman; 15 - Parker Kelly - Junior	Outfielders: 1 - Dillon Carter - Freshman; 7 - Cody Masters - Junior; 20 - Max Marusak - Sophomore; 44 - Tanner O'Tremba - Sophomore; Utility: 4 - Dru Baker (INF/OF) - Sophomore; 8 - Kurt Wilson (OF/P) - Junior; 9 - Dylan Neuse (INF/OF) - Junior; 18 - Cole Stilwell (INF/C) - Sophomore; 19 - Easton Murrell (INF/OF) - Junior; 21 - Nate Rombach (C/INF) - Freshman

=== Coaching staff ===
2020 Texas Tech Red Raiders coaching staff
Name	Position	Seasons at Texas Tech	Alma mater
Tim Tadlock	Head coach	8	Texas Tech
Matt Gardner	Assistant coach	8	Oklahoma State
J-Bob Thomas	Assistant coach	8	Abilene Christian
Ray Hayward	Special assistant	8	Oklahoma
Eric Gutierrez	Volunteer Assistant Coach	2	Texas Tech
Joe Hughes	Director of operations	8	Oklahoma
Bryan Simpson	Assistant Athletic Trainer - Baseball	7	Hardin–Simmons
Shishir Bhakta	Equipment manager	21	Lubbock High School
Lyndee Kiesling	Director of Player Development/Support Services	4	Texas Tech
Tory Stephens	Assistant Athletics Director/Director of Strength & Conditioning/Sports Nutrition	9	Texas Tech

== Schedule and results ==
2020 Texas Tech Red Raiders baseball game log: 16–3
Regular season: 16–3

February: 10–1
Date	Time	Opponent	Rank	Site/stadium	Score	Win	Loss	Save	Attendance	Overall record	Big 12 Record	Ref
February 14	1:00 PM	Houston Baptist	#6	Dan Law Field at Rip Griffin Park • Lubbock, TX	5–1	**Beeter** (1–0)	Gruller (0–1)	**Dallas** (1)	3,511	1–0	—	
February 15	12:00 PM	Houston Baptist	#6	Dan Law Field at Rip Griffin Park • Lubbock, TX	24–3 (7)	**Becker** (1–0)	Kilimeck (0–1)	—	4,299	2–0	—	
February 15	3:25 PM	Northern Colorado	#6	Dan Law Field at Rip Griffin Park • Lubbock, TX	22–4	**Bonnin** (1–0)	Colehower (0–1)	—	4,229	3–0	—	
February 16	3:00 PM	Northern Colorado	#6	Dan Law Field at Rip Griffin Park • Lubbock, TX	14–3 (7)	**Montgomery** (1–0)	Wyatt (0–1)	—	3,928	4–0	—	
February 21	7:00 PM	vs. Tennessee; Round Rock Classic	#6	Dell Diamond • Round Rock, TX	2–6	Dallas (2–0)	**Beeter** (1–1)	Hunley (2)	4,552	4–1	—	
February 22	6:00 PM	vs. #25 Stanford; Round Rock Classic	#6	Dell Diamond • Round Rock, TX	7–2	**Bonnin** (2–0)	Mathews (0–1)	**Dallas** (2)	8,064	5–1	—	
February 23	3:00 PM	vs. Houston; Round Rock Classic	#6	Dell Diamond • Round Rock, TX	3–2 (10)	**Devine** (1–0)	Hurdsman (0–1)	—	5,123	6–1	—	
February 25	2:00 PM	Southern	#5	Dan Law Field at Rip Griffin Park • Lubbock, TX	13–2	**Montgomery** (2–0)	Bohannon (0–1)	—	3,021	7–1	—	
February 26	1:00 PM	Southern	#5	Dan Law Field at Rip Griffin Park • Lubbock, TX	10–3	**Dobbins** (1–0)	Paul (0–1)	—	3,009	8–1	—	
February 28	1:00 PM	vs. Florida Atlantic	#5	Mike Martin Field at Dick Howser Stadium • Tallahassee, FL	7–1	**Brutoski** (1–0)	Reese (2–1)	—	4,249	9–1	—	
February 29	5:00 PM	at #9 Florida State	#5	Mike Martin Field at Dick Howser Stadium • Tallahassee, FL	6–5 (11)	**McMillon** (1–0)	Messick (1–1)	—	5,443	10–1	—	

March: 6–2
Date	Time	Opponent	Rank	Site/stadium	Score	Win	Loss	Save	Attendance	Overall record	Big 12 Record	Ref
March 1	12:00 PM	at #9 Florida State	#5	Mike Martin Field at Dick Howser Stadium • Tallahassee, FL	4–3	**Sublette** (1–0)	Hare (0–1)	**Devine** (1)	4,279	11–1	—	
March 3	3:00 PM (Note: First pitch for this game was originally scheduled for 6:30 PM but was moved up to 3:00 PM due to rain.)	UNLV	#5	Dan Law Field at Rip Griffin Park • Lubbock, TX	11–2	**Montgomery** (3–0)	Mattera (0–2)	—	3,087	12–1	—	
March 4	2:00 PM	UNLV	#5	Dan Law Field at Rip Griffin Park • Lubbock, TX	11–3	**Dobbins** (2–0)	Balko (0–1)	—	3,032	13–1	—	
March 6	6:30 PM	Rice	#5	Dan Law Field at Rip Griffin Park • Lubbock, TX	7–1	**Beeter** (2–1)	DeLeon (1–3)	—	4,432	14–1	—	
March 7	2:00 PM	Rice	#5	Dan Law Field at Rip Griffin Park • Lubbock, TX	19–12	**Sublette** (2–0)	Cienfuegos (1–1)	—	4,432	15–1	—	
March 8	11:30 AM	Rice	#5	Dan Law Field at Rip Griffin Park • Lubbock, TX	7–6 (11)	**Dallas** (1–0)	Rickett (0–1)	—	3,587	16–1	—	
March 10	6:00 PM	vs. #17 Mississippi State	#4	MGM Park • Biloxi, MS	3–6	Harding (1–0)	**Montgomery** (3–1)	Price (1)	6,076	16–2	—	
March 11	5:00 PM	vs. #17 Mississippi State	#4	MGM Park • Biloxi, MS	2–3	Riley (1–0)	**Brustoski** (0–1)	Price (2)	6,029	16–3	—	
March 13	6:30 PM	West Virginia	#4	Dan Law Field at Rip Griffin Park • Lubbock, TX				—				
March 14	2:00 PM	West Virginia	#4	Dan Law Field at Rip Griffin Park • Lubbock, TX				—				
March 15	12:30 PM	West Virginia	#4	Dan Law Field at Rip Griffin Park • Lubbock, TX				—				
March 17	7:00 PM	at New Mexico State		Santa Ana Star Field • Albuquerque, NM				—			—	
March 18	1:00 PM	at New Mexico State		Santa Ana Star Field • Albuquerque, NM				—			—	
March 20	6:30 PM	Minnesota		Dan Law Field at Rip Griffin Park • Lubbock, TX				—			—	
March 21	2:00 PM	Minnesota		Dan Law Field at Rip Griffin Park • Lubbock, TX				—			—	
March 22	11:30 AM	Minnesota		Dan Law Field at Rip Griffin Park • Lubbock, TX				—			—	
March 24	6:30 PM	Oregon		Dan Law Field at Rip Griffin Park • Lubbock, TX				—			—	
March 25	2:00 PM	Oregon		Dan Law Field at Rip Griffin Park • Lubbock, TX				—			—	
March 27	6:30 PM	Kansas State		Dan Law Field at Rip Griffin Park • Lubbock, TX				—				
March 28	2:00 PM	Kansas State		Dan Law Field at Rip Griffin Park • Lubbock, TX				—				
March 29	1:00 PM	Kansas State		Dan Law Field at Rip Griffin Park • Lubbock, TX				—				

April: 0–0
Date	Time	Opponent	Rank	Site/stadium	Score	Win	Loss	Save	Attendance	Overall record	Big 12 Record	Ref
April 1	TBD	at UTSA		Nelson W. Wolff Municipal Stadium • San Antonio, TX				—			—	
April 3	8:00 PM	at Oklahoma State		O'Brate Stadium • Stillwater, OK				—				
April 4	3:00 PM	at Oklahoma State		O'Brate Stadium • Stillwater, OK				—				
April 5	1:00 PM	at Oklahoma State		O'Brate Stadium • Stillwater, OK				—				
April 7	7:00 PM	vs. Abilene Christian		Security Bank Ballpark • Midland, TX				—			—	
April 9	6:30 PM	Oklahoma		Dan Law Field at Rip Griffin Park • Lubbock, TX				—				
April 10	8:00 PM	Oklahoma		Dan Law Field at Rip Griffin Park • Lubbock, TX				—				
April 11	2:00 PM	Oklahoma		Dan Law Field at Rip Griffin Park • Lubbock, TX				—				
April 13	6:30 PM	New Mexico		Dan Law Field at Rip Griffin Park • Lubbock, TX				—			—	
April 14	1:00 PM	New Mexico		Dan Law Field at Rip Griffin Park • Lubbock, TX				—			—	
April 17	6:30 PM	at Baylor		Baylor Ballpark • Waco, TX				—				
April 18	3:00 PM	at Baylor		Baylor Ballpark • Waco, TX				—				
April 19	1:00 PM	at Baylor		Baylor Ballpark • Waco, TX				—				
April 24	6:00 PM	at Kansas		Hoglund Ballpark • Lawrence, KS				—				
April 25	2:00 PM	at Kansas		Hoglund Ballpark • Lawrence, KS				—				
April 26	1:00 PM	at Kansas		Hoglund Ballpark • Lawrence, KS				—				
April 28	6:00 PM	at Abilene Christian		Crutcher Scott Field • Abilene, TX				—			—	

May: 0–0
Date	Time	Opponent	Rank	Site/stadium	Score	Win	Loss	Save	Attendance	Overall record	Big 12 Record	Ref
May 1	6:30 PM	Texas		Dan Law Field at Rip Griffin Park • Lubbock, TX				—				
May 2	8:00 PM	Texas		Dan Law Field at Rip Griffin Park • Lubbock, TX				—				
May 3	2:00 PM	Texas		Dan Law Field at Rip Griffin Park • Lubbock, TX				—				
May 5	6:30 PM	at Dallas Baptist		Horner Ballpark • Dallas, TX				—			—	
May 14	6:30 PM	at TCU		Lupton Stadium • Fort Worth, TX				—				
May 15	6:30 PM	at TCU		Lupton Stadium • Fort Worth, TX				—				
May 16	6:30 PM	at TCU		Lupton Stadium • Fort Worth, TX				—				

Post–season: 0–0

Big 12 Tournament: 0–0
Date	Time	Opponent	Rank	Site/stadium	Score	Win	Loss	Save	Attendance	Overall record	B12T Record	Ref
May 20	TBA	vs. TBA		Chickasaw Bricktown Ballpark • Oklahoma City, OK								

Legend: = Win = Loss = Cancelled
Bold = Texas Tech team member

"#" represents ranking. All rankings from D1Baseball on the date of the contest.
"()" represents postseason seeding in the Big 12 Tournament.

== Rankings ==
Ranking movements Legend: ██ Increase in ranking ██ Decrease in ranking
	Week					
Poll	Pre	1	2	3	4	Final
Coaches'	3	3*	3	4	3	3
Baseball America	6	4	2	2	2	2
Collegiate Baseball^	3	1	4	3	2	7
NCBWA†	3	1	3	2	2	2
D1Baseball	6	6	5	5	4	4

^ Collegiate Baseball ranked 40 teams in their preseason poll, but only ranked 30 teams weekly during the season.
† NCBWA ranks 30 teams in their preseason poll, but only ranks 25 teams weekly during the season.
* A new poll was not released for this week, so for comparison purposes, the previous week's ranking is inserted in this week's slot.

== 2020 MLB draft ==
Player	Position	Round	Overall	MLB team
Clayton Beeter	LHP	B	66	Los Angeles Dodgers
Bryce Bonnin	RHP	3	84	Cincinnati Reds
