= 2020 UT Arlington Mavericks baseball team =

American college baseball season

2020 UT Arlington Mavericks baseball
- Conference: Sun Belt Conference
- West Division
- Record: 12–4 (0–0 SBC)
- Head coach: Darin Thomas (13th season)
- Assistant coaches: Jon Wente; Chad Comer
- Home stadium: Clay Gould Ballpark

2020 Sun Belt Conference baseball standings
	Conf.				Overall
Team	W		L	PCT	W		L	PCT
East Division
Coastal Carolina ‍‍‍	0	–	0	–	11	–	5	.688
Georgia Southern ‍‍‍	0	–	0	–	11	–	5	.688
Appalachian State ‍‍‍	0	–	0	–	11	–	6	.647
Georgia State ‍‍‍	0	–	0	–	9	–	7	.563
Troy ‍‍‍	0	–	0	–	9	–	8	.529
South Alabama ‍‍‍	0	–	0	–	8	–	10	.444
West Division
Texas State ‍‍‍	0	–	0	–	14	–	4	.778
UT Arlington ‍‍‍	0	–	0	–	12	–	4	.750
Louisiana–Monroe ‍‍‍	0	–	0	–	12	–	5	.706
Little Rock ‍‍‍	0	–	0	–	9	–	8	.529
Louisiana ‍‍‍	0	–	0	–	8	–	9	.471
Arkansas State ‍‍‍	0	–	0	–	7	–	9	.438
x – Division champion ‡ – Tournament champion y – Invited to the NCAA tournament As of March 12, 2020; Rankings from D1Baseball

The 2020 UT Arlington Mavericks baseball team represented the University of Texas at Arlington in the 2020 NCAA Division I baseball season. The Mavericks played their home games at Clay Gould Ballpark and were led by thirteenth year head coach Darin Thomas.

On March 12, the Sun Belt Conference announced the indefinite suspension of all spring athletics, including baseball, due to the increasing risk of the COVID-19 pandemic. Soon after, the Sun Belt cancelled all season and postseason play.

== Preseason ==
=== Signing Day Recruits ===
Player	Hometown	Previous Team
Pitchers
Zach Peters	Joshua, Texas	Joshua HS
Cade Citelli	Prosper, Texas	Prosper HS
Jack Hagan	McKinney, Texas	McKinney Boyd HS
Jackson Blue	The Woodlands, Texas	The Woodlands Christian Academy
Will Thomas	The Woodlands, Texas	The Woodlands HS
Brayden Brooks	Westminster, Colorado	South Mountain CC
Jarod Seals	Haslet, Texas	North Central Texas College
Zach Norris	Paris, Texas	Parish JC
Hitters
Cason Gregory	Cleburne, Texas	Cleburne HS
Sam Crowell	Heath, Texas	Rockwall Heath HS
Zach Henry	Rockwall, Texas	Rockwall HS
JD Wadleigh	Lakewood, Colorado	South Mountain CC
Steven Saunders	Sierra Vista, Arizona	Cochise College
Tad Thompson	Godley, Texas	Weatherford College
Matt Novis	Tempe, Arizona	Yavapai College

=== Sun Belt Conference Coaches Poll ===
The Sun Belt Conference Coaches Poll will be released sometime around January 30, 2020 and the Mavericks were picked to finish first in the West Division and tied for fourth overall in the conference.

Coaches poll (West)
Predicted finish	Team	Votes (1st place)
1	UT Arlington	58 (3)
2	Louisiana	57 (5)
3	Texas State	55 (3)
4	Little Rock	39 (1)
5	Louisiana–Monroe	25
6	Arkansas State	18

=== Preseason All-Sun Belt Team & Honors ===
No players from UT Arlington were chosen.

== Roster ==
2020 UT Arlington Mavericks roster
Pitchers: 5 Tanner King - Junior; 12 Tristan Tom - Redshirt Senior; 15 Wyatt Divis - Senior; 18 Carlos Tavera - Junior; 19 Toby Davis - Senior; 22 Michael Wong - Junior; 24 David Moffat - Junior; 26 Kody Bullard - Redshirt Junior; 33 Spencer Sawin - Junior; 34 Cade Winquest - Sophomore; 35 Ryan Thomas - Junior; 40 Jonathan McNair - Freshman; 42 Parker Schkade - Redshirt Senior; 44 Logan Austin - Redshirt Senior; 45 Brennan Smith - Redshirt Sophomore; 47 Trevor Hukill - Redshirt Junior; 49 Riley Bost - Sophomore; 54 Trevor Pruitt - Sophomore	Catchers: 17 Sam Gotlieb - Junior; 21 Andrew Miller - Senior; 25 Joe Terlizzi - Redshirt Freshman; Infielders: 3 Michael Cavanagh - Sophomore; 4 Cameron Dobbs - Redshirt Junior; 6 Boone Montgomery - Junior; 7 Tyler Rice - Sophomore; 13 Josh Minjarez - Redshirt Senior; 23 Andrew Keefer - Senior; 29 Zac Cook - Senior; 36 Justin Marino - Redshirt Sophomore	Outfielders: 2 Connor Aube - Senior; 16 Anthony Dominguez - Senior; 20 David Renning - Junior; 28 Phillip Childs - Redshirt Junior; Utility: 9 Cesar Gomez - Senior; 10 Cole Solomon - Redshirt Junior

=== Coaching staff ===
2020 UT Arlington Mavericks coaching staff
- Darin Thomas – Head Coach – 13th year
- Jon Wente – Associate head coach/recruiting coordinator – 6th year
- Chad Comer – Assistant Head Coach – 1st year
- Parker Osborne – Volunteer Assistant Coach – 1st year

== Schedule and results ==
Legend
	UT Arlington win
	UT Arlington loss
	Postponement/Cancelation/Suspensions
**Bold**	UT Arlington team member

2020 UT Arlington Mavericks baseball game log
Regular season (12-4)

February (7-3)
Date	Opponent	Rank	Site/stadium	Score	Win	Loss	Save	TV	Attendance	Overall record	SBC record
Feb. 14	Texas A&M–Corpus Christi		Clay Gould Ballpark • Arlington, TX	**W** 7-0	**Tavera** (1-0)	Gaddis (0-1)	**Divis** (1)		607	1-0	
Feb. 15	Texas A&M–Corpus Christi		Clay Gould Ballpark • Arlington, TX	**W** 4-1	**Bullard** (1-0)	Thomas (0-1)	**Gomez** (1)		701	2-0	
Feb. 16	Texas A&M–Corpus Christi		Clay Gould Ballpark • Arlington, TX	**W** 3-1	**Winquest** (1-0)	Miller (0-1)	**Gomez** (2)		672	3-0	
Feb. 18	at Dallas Baptist		Horner Ballpark • Dallas, TX	**L** 0-4	Heaton (1-0)	**Bost** (0-1)	None		651	3-1	
SFA Tournament
Feb. 22	vs. SIU Edwardsville		Jaycees Field • Nacogdoches, TX	**L** 1-2	Serwa (2-0)	**Tavera** (1-1)	Milam (1)		67	3-2	
Feb. 23	vs. SIU Edwardsville		Jaycees Field • Nacogdoches, TX	**W** 3-2	**Gomez** (1-0)	Swanson (0-2)	None		78	4-2	
Feb. 23	at Stephen F. Austin		Jaycees Field • Nacogdoches, TX	**W** 10-4	**Bullard** (2-0)	Stobart (0-1)	None		271	5-2	
Feb. 25	No. 23 Dallas Baptist		Clay Gould Ballpark • Arlington, TX	**W** 6-3	**Divis** (1-0)	Heaton (1-1)	**Gomez** (3)		626	6-2	
Feb. 28	Utah		Clay Gould Ballpark • Arlington, TX	**W** 6-0	**Tavera** (2-1)	Kelly (0-1)	None		447	7-2	
Feb. 29	Utah		Clay Gould Ballpark • Arlington, TX	**L** 5-9	Watson (1-1)	**Bullard** (2-1)	Schramm (1)		570	7-3	

March (5-1)
Date	Opponent	Rank	Site/stadium	Score	Win	Loss	Save	TV	Attendance	Overall record	SBC record
Mar. 1	Utah		Clay Gould Ballpark • Arlington, TX	**W** 8-1	**Moffat** (1-0)	Giffins (0-1)	None		480	8-3	
Mar. 3	at No. 22 TCU		Lupton Stadium • Fort Worth, TX	**W** 6-4 (12 inn)	**Austin** (1-0)	Rudis (0-1)	None		3,304	9-3	
Mar. 6	UTSA		Clay Gould Ballpark • Arlington, TX	**W** 13-7	**Tavera** (3-1)	Foust (3-1)	None		553	10-3	
Mar. 7	UTSA		Clay Gould Ballpark • Arlington, TX	**W** 9-5	**Bullard** (3-1)	Daughety (3-1)	**Divis** (2)		591	11-3	
Mar. 8	UTSA		Clay Gould Ballpark • Arlington, TX	**W** 1-0	**Austin** (2-0)	Mason (0-2)	**Gomez** (4)		486	12-3	
Mar. 10	No. 13 Oklahoma		Clay Gould Ballpark • San Marcos, TX	**L** 0-3	Bennett (3-0)	**Winquest** (1-1)	Ruffcorn (5)		936	12-4	
Mar. 13	at Little Rock		Gary Hogan Field • Little Rock, AR	Season suspended due to COVID-19 pandemic							
Mar. 14	at Little Rock		Gary Hogan Field • Little Rock, AR	Season suspended due to COVID-19 pandemic							
Mar. 15	at Little Rock		Gary Hogan Field • Little Rock, AR	Season suspended due to COVID-19 pandemic							
Mar. 17	at Baylor		Baylor Ballpark • Waco, TX	Season suspended due to COVID-19 pandemic							
Mar. 18	vs. Texas		Dr Pepper Ballpark • Frisco, TX	Season suspended due to COVID-19 pandemic							
Mar. 20	Georgia State		Clay Gould Ballpark • Arlington, TX	Season suspended due to COVID-19 pandemic							
Mar. 21	Georgia State		Clay Gould Ballpark • Arlington, TX	Season suspended due to COVID-19 pandemic							
Mar. 22	Georgia State		Clay Gould Ballpark • Arlington, TX	Season suspended due to COVID-19 pandemic							
Mar. 24	TCU		Clay Gould Ballpark • Arlington, TX	Season suspended due to COVID-19 pandemic							
Mar. 27	Troy		Clay Gould Ballpark • Arlington, TX	Season suspended due to COVID-19 pandemic							
Mar. 28	Troy		Clay Gould Ballpark • Arlington, TX	Season suspended due to COVID-19 pandemic							
Mar. 29	Troy		Clay Gould Ballpark • Arlington, TX	Season suspended due to COVID-19 pandemic							

April (0-0)
Date	Opponent	Rank	Site/stadium	Score	Win	Loss	Save	TV	Attendance	Overall record	SBC record
Apr. 1	at Sam Houston State		Don Sanders Stadium • Huntsville, TX	Season suspended due to COVID-19 pandemic							
Apr. 3	at Louisiana		M. L. Tigue Moore Field at Russo Park • Lafayette, LA	Season suspended due to COVID-19 pandemic							
Apr. 4	at Louisiana		M. L. Tigue Moore Field at Russo Park • Lafayette, LA	Season suspended due to COVID-19 pandemic							
Apr. 5	at Louisiana		M. L. Tigue Moore Field at Russo Park • Lafayette, LA	Season suspended due to COVID-19 pandemic							
Apr. 7	at TCU		Lupton Stadium • Fort Worth, TX	Season suspended due to COVID-19 pandemic							
Apr. 9	Arkansas State		Clay Gould Ballpark • Arlington, TX	Season suspended due to COVID-19 pandemic							
Apr. 10	Arkansas State		Clay Gould Ballpark • Arlington, TX	Season suspended due to COVID-19 pandemic							
Apr. 11	Arkansas State		Clay Gould Ballpark • Arlington, TX	Season suspended due to COVID-19 pandemic							
Apr. 14	Abilene Christian		Clay Gould Ballpark • Arlington, TX	Season suspended due to COVID-19 pandemic							
Apr. 17	at Coastal Carolina		Springs Brooks Stadium • Conway, SC	Season suspended due to COVID-19 pandemic							
Apr. 18	at Coastal Carolina		Springs Brooks Stadium • Conway, SC	Season suspended due to COVID-19 pandemic							
Apr. 19	at Coastal Carolina		Springs Brooks Stadium • Conway, SC	Season suspended due to COVID-19 pandemic							
Apr. 21	at Abilene Christian		Crutcher Scott Field • Abilene, TX	Season suspended due to COVID-19 pandemic							
Apr. 24	at Georgia Southern		J. I. Clements Stadium • Statesboro, GA	Season suspended due to COVID-19 pandemic							
Apr. 25	at Georgia Southern		J. I. Clements Stadium • Statesboro, GA	Season suspended due to COVID-19 pandemic							
Apr. 26	at Georgia Southern		J. I. Clements Stadium • Statesboro, GA	Season suspended due to COVID-19 pandemic							
Apr. 28	at Texas A&M		Olsen Field at Blue Bell Park • College Station, TX	Season suspended due to COVID-19 pandemic							

May (0–0)
Date	Opponent	Rank	Site/stadium	Score	Win	Loss	Save	TV	Attendance	Overall record	SBC record
May 1	Louisiana–Monroe		Clay Gould Ballpark • Arlington, TX	Season suspended due to COVID-19 pandemic							
May 2	Louisiana–Monroe		Clay Gould Ballpark • Arlington, TX	Season suspended due to COVID-19 pandemic							
May 3	Louisiana–Monroe		Clay Gould Ballpark • Arlington, TX	Season suspended due to COVID-19 pandemic							
May 8	at South Alabama		Eddie Stanky Field • Mobile, AL	Season suspended due to COVID-19 pandemic							
May 9	at South Alabama		Eddie Stanky Field • Mobile, AL	Season suspended due to COVID-19 pandemic							
May 10	at South Alabama		Eddie Stanky Field • Mobile, AL	Season suspended due to COVID-19 pandemic							
May 14	Texas State		Clay Gould Ballpark • Arlington, TX	Season suspended due to COVID-19 pandemic							
May 15	Texas State		Clay Gould Ballpark • Arlington, TX	Season suspended due to COVID-19 pandemic							
May 16	Texas State		Clay Gould Ballpark • Arlington, TX	Season suspended due to COVID-19 pandemic							

Postseason (0–0)

SBC Tournament (0–0)
Date	Opponent	Seed/Rank	Site/stadium	Score	Win	Loss	Save	TV	Attendance	Overall record	SBC record
May 20			Montgomery Riverwalk Stadium • Montgomery, AL	Championship Series suspended due to COVID-19 pandemic							

Schedule source:

*Rankings are based on the team's current ranking in the D1Baseball poll.
