= 2020 TCU Horned Frogs baseball team =

American college baseball season

2020 TCU Horned Frogs baseball
- Conference: Big 12 Conference
- Record: 11–4 (0–0 Big 12)
- Head coach: Jim Schlossnagle (17th season)
- Assistant coaches: Bill Mosiello (7th season); Kirk Saarloos (8th season); John DiLaura (1st season)
- Home stadium: Lupton Stadium

2020 Big 12 Conference baseball standings
	Conf.				Overall
Team	W		L	PCT	W		L	PCT
No. 3 Texas Tech ‍‍‍	0	–	0	–	16	–	3	.842
No. 22 Texas ‍‍‍	0	–	0	–	14	–	3	.824
No. 13 Oklahoma ‍‍‍	0	–	0	–	14	–	4	.778
TCU ‍‍‍	0	–	0	–	11	–	4	.733
Oklahoma State ‍‍‍	0	–	0	–	13	–	5	.722
West Virginia ‍‍‍	0	–	0	–	11	–	5	.688
Baylor ‍‍‍	0	–	0	–	10	–	6	.625
Kansas State ‍‍‍	0	–	0	–	10	–	7	.588
Kansas ‍‍‍	0	–	0	–	7	–	10	.412
‡ – Tournament champion As of March 15, 2020; Rankings from D1baseball

The 2020 TCU Horned Frogs baseball team represented Texas Christian University during the 2020 NCAA Division I baseball season. The Horned Frogs played their home games at Lupton Stadium as a member of the Big 12 Conference. They were led by head coach Jim Schlossnagle, in his 17th season at TCU.

On March 13, the Big 12 Conference canceled the remainder of the season due to the Coronavirus pandemic.

== Previous season ==
The 2019 TCU Horned Frogs baseball team notched a 29–24 (11–13) regular season record and finished sixth in the Big 12 Conference standings. The Horned Frogs reached the 2019 Big 12 Conference baseball tournament semifinals, where they were defeated by Oklahoma State. TCU received an at-large bid to the 2019 NCAA Division I baseball tournament, where they were defeated in the Fayetteville Regional final by Arkansas.

== Personnel ==
=== Coaching staff ===
Name	Position	Seasons at TCU	Alma mater
Jim Schlossnagle	Head coach	17	Elon University (1992)
Bill Mosiello	Associate head coach	7	California State University, Fresno (1986)
Kirk Saarloos	Assistant Coach/recruiting coordinator	8	California State University, Fullerton (2001)
John DiLaura	Volunteer Assistant Coach	1	University of Michigan (2013)

=== Roster ===
2020 TCU Horned Frogs Roster
Pitchers: 12 - Jacob Meador - Freshman; 15 - Riley Cornelio - Freshman; 17 - Jacob Speaker - Freshman; 19 - Harrison Beethe - Junior; 20 - Cal Coughlin - Senior; 21 - Charles King - Senior; 23 - Haylen Green - Senior; 24 - John Kodros - RS Sophomore; 26 - Matt Rudis - Sophomore; 29 - Augie Mihlbauer - Junior; 30 - Drew Hill - Junior; 31 - Dalton Brown - RS Senior; 33 - Russell Smith - RS Sophomore; 34 - Nolan Hudi - Freshman; 35 - Grant Miller - Junior; 36 - Marcelo Perez - Sophomore; 37 - Johnny Ray - RS Sophomore; 39 - Austin Krob - Sophomore; 44 - Caleb Sloane - RS Sophomore	Catchers: 4 - Kurtis Byrne - Freshman; 10 - Zach Humphreys - Senior; 13 - Mason Speaker - Freshman; Infielders: 3 - Austin Henry - RS Senior; 7 - Rhett Maynard - Freshman; 9 - Conner Shepherd - RS Senior; 16 - Gene Wood - RS Senior; 18 - Bobby Goodloe - Sophomore; 25 - Tommy Sacco - Junior; 28 - Gray Rodgers - Junior	Outfielders: 5 - Sam Thompson - Freshman; 6 - Hunter Wolfe - RS Senior; 8 - Cole Johnson - Sophomore; 11 - Phillip Sikes - Junior; 27 - Porter Brown - RS Freshman; 38 - Cruz Shope - Junior

== Schedule and results ==
2020 TCU Horned Frogs baseball game log
Regular season (11–4)
February (9–1)

Date	Time (CT)	TV	Opponent	Rank	Stadium	Score	Win	Loss	Save	Attendance	Overall	MVC	
February 14	6:30 pm		Kentucky*	#20	Lupton Stadium • Fort Worth, TX	**W** 5–1	**Green** (1–0)	Ramsey (0–1)	–	3,879	1–0	–	Stats; Story
February 15	2:00 pm		Kentucky*	#20	Lupton Stadium • Fort Worth, TX	**W** 7–1	**Krob** (1–0)	Stupp (0–1)	–	3,986	2–0	–	Stats; Story
February 16	12:30 pm		Kentucky*	#20	Lupton Stadium • Fort Worth, TX	**W** 10–5	**Hill** (1–0)	Marsh (0–1)	–	4,030	3–0	–	Stats; Story
February 18	6:30 pm		Abilene Christian*	#20	Lupton Stadium • Fort Worth, TX	**W** 14–4	**Cornelio** (1–0)	Chirpich (0–1)	–	3,499	4–0	–	Stats; Story
February 22	6:30 pm	BTN+	at Minnesota*	#20	U.S. Bank Stadium • Minneapolis, MN	**W** 12–0	**Ray** (1–0)	Meyer (1–1)	–	1,255	5–0	–	Stats; Story
February 23	2:00 pm	BTN+	at Minnesota*	#20	U.S. Bank Stadium • Minneapolis, MN	**L** 6–7	Massey (1–0)	**King** (0–1)	Horton (2)	938	5–1	–	Stats; Story
February 24	12:15 pm	BTN+	at Minnesota*	#21	U.S. Bank Stadium • Minneapolis, MN	**W** 11–2	**Smith** (1–0)	Fredrickson (0–2)	–	242	6–1	–	Stats; Story
February 26	6:30 pm		Stephen F. Austin*	#21	Lupton Stadium • Fort Worth, TX	**W** 12–3	**Hill** (2–0)	Sgambelluri (0–2)	–	3,712	7–1	–	Stats; Story
February 28	6:30 pm	FSSW+	California*	#21	Lupton Stadium • Fort Worth, TX	W 5–4	**Perez** (1–0)	Zobac (1–1)	**Beethe** (1)	3,809	8–1	–	Stats; Story
February 29	3:00 pm		California*	#21	Lupton Stadium • Fort Worth, TX	**W** 3–0	**King** (1–1)	Holman (0–3)	**Green** (1)	4,507	9–1	–	Stats; Story

March (2–3)

Date	Time (CT)	TV	Opponent	Rank	Stadium	Score	Win	Loss	Save	Attendance	Overall	Big 12	
March 1	1:00 pm		California*	#21	Lupton Stadium • Fort Worth, TX	**W** 6–1	**Russell** (2–0)	Sullivan (0–1)	–	3,770	10–1	–	Stats; Story
March 3	6:30 pm		UT Arlington*	#18	Lupton Stadium • Fort Worth, TX	**L** 4–6^{12}	Austin (1–0)	**Rudis** (0–1)	–	3,304	10–2	–	Stats; Story
March 6	8:00 pm		at USC*	#18	Dedeaux Field • Los Angeles, CA	**L** 1–2	Hurt (2–1)	**Ray** (1–1)	Wanger (2)	1,194	10–3	–	Stats; Story
March 7	4:00 pm		at #1 UCLA*	#18	Jackie Robinson Stadium • Los Angeles, CA	**W** 8–4	**King** (2–1)	Nastrini (2–1)	**Krob** (1)	952	11–3	–	Stats; Story
March 8	12:00 pm		#5 Vanderbilt*	#18	Dedeaux Field • Los Angeles, CA	**L** 3–4	Brown (1–2)	**Hill** (2–1)	–	711	11–4	–	Stats
March 10	8:00 pm		at San Diego State*		Tony Gwynn Stadium • San Diego, CA								
March 13	6:30 pm	FSSW+	Maryland*		Lupton Stadium • Fort Worth, TX								
March 14	2:00 pm		Maryland*		Lupton Stadium • Fort Worth, TX								
March 15	1:00 pm		Maryland*		Lupton Stadium • Fort Worth, TX								
March 17	6:30 pm		Sam Houston State*		Lupton Stadium • Fort Worth, TX								
March 20	6:00 pm	ESPN+	at Oklahoma State		O'Brate Stadium • Stillwater, OK								
March 21	3:00 pm	ESPN+	at Oklahoma State		O'Brate Stadium • Stillwater, OK								
March 22	1:00 pm	ESPN+	at Oklahoma State		O'Brate Stadium • Stillwater, OK								
March 24	6:30 pm		at UT Arlington*		Clay Gould Ballpark • Arlington, TX								
March 27	6:30 pm		Oklahoma		Lupton Stadium • Fort Worth, TX								
March 28	2:00 pm	FSSW+	Oklahoma		Lupton Stadium • Fort Worth, TX								
March 29	12:00 pm	ESPNU	Oklahoma		Lupton Stadium • Fort Worth, TX								
March 31	6:30 pm		at Abilene Christian*		Crutcher Scott Field • Abilene, TX								

April (0–0)

Date	Time (CT)	TV	Opponent	Rank	Stadium	Score	Win	Loss	Save	Attendance	Overall	Big 12
April 3	6:00 pm	ESPN+	at Kansas		Hoglund Ballpark • Lawrence, KS							
April 4	2:00 pm	ESPN+	at Kansas		Hoglund Ballpark • Lawrence, KS							
April 5	1:00 pm	ESPN+	at Kansas		Hoglund Ballpark • Lawrence, KS							
April 7	6:30 pm		UT Arlington*		Lupton Stadium • Fort Worth, TX							
April 9	6:30 pm		West Virginia		Lupton Stadium • Fort Worth, TX							
April 10	6:30 pm		West Virginia		Lupton Stadium • Fort Worth, TX							
April 11	12:00 pm		West Virginia		Lupton Stadium • Fort Worth, TX							
April 14	6:30 pm		at Dallas Baptist*		Horner Ballpark • Dallas, TX							
April 17	5:30 pm		at Stetson*		Melching Field • DeLand, FL							
April 18	5:30 pm		at Stetson*		Melching Field • DeLand, FL							
April 19	12:00 pm		at Stetson*		Melching Field • DeLand, FL							
April 21	6:30 pm		Texas–Rio Grande Valley*		Lupton Stadium • Fort Worth, TX							
April 24	6:35 pm	ESPN+	at Baylor		Baylor Ballpark • Waco, TX							
April 25	3:05 pm	ESPN+	at Baylor		Baylor Ballpark • Waco, TX							
April 26	1:05 pm	ESPN+	at Baylor		Baylor Ballpark • Waco, TX							
April 28	6:30 pm		Dallas Baptist*		Lupton Stadium • Fort Worth, TX							

May (0–0)

Date	Time (CT)	TV	Opponent	Rank	Stadium	Score	Win	Loss	Save	Attendance	Overall	Big 12
May 1	6:30 pm	FSSW+	Kansas State		Lupton Stadium • Fort Worth, TX							
May 2	4:00 pm	FSSW	Kansas State		Lupton Stadium • Fort Worth, TX							
May 3	1:00 pm	FSSW+	Kansas State		Lupton Stadium • Fort Worth, TX							
May 8	6:30 pm	LHN	at Texas		UFCU Disch–Falk Field • Austin, TX							
May 9	2:30 pm	LHN	at Texas		UFCU Disch–Falk Field • Austin, TX							
May 10	5:00 pm	FSN	at Texas		UFCU Disch–Falk Field • Austin, TX							
May 12	6:30 pm		Incarnate Word*		Lupton Stadium • Fort Worth, TX							
May 14	6:30 pm	FSSW+	Texas Tech		Lupton Stadium • Fort Worth, TX							
May 15	6:30 pm	FSSW+	Texas Tech		Lupton Stadium • Fort Worth, TX							
May 16	6:30 pm	ESPNU	Texas Tech		Lupton Stadium • Fort Worth, TX							

Legend: = Win = Loss = Canceled Bold = TCU team member
"#" represents ranking. All rankings from Collegiate Baseball on the date of the contest.
"()" represents postseason seeding in the Big 12 Tournament or NCAA Regional, respectively.

== Rankings ==
Ranking movements Legend: ██ Increase in ranking ██ Decrease in ranking — = Not ranked RV = Received votes
	Week																		
Poll	Pre	1	2	3	4	5	6	7	8	9	10	11	12	13	14	15	16	17	Final
Coaches'	RV	RV*		18	RV														
Baseball America	—	—	—	22	—														
Collegiate Baseball^	20	20	21	18	—														
NCBWA†	28	25	26	20	29														
D1Baseball	—	—	—	22	—														

^ Collegiate Baseball ranked 40 teams in their preseason poll, but only ranked 30 teams weekly during the season.
† NCBWA ranks 30 teams in their preseason poll, but only ranks 25 teams weekly during the season.
* A new poll was not released for this week, so for comparison purposes, the previous week's ranking is inserted in this week's slot.
