= 2020 Oklahoma State Cowboys baseball team =

American college baseball season

2020 Oklahoma State Cowboys baseball
- Conference: Big 12 Conference
- Record: 13–5 (0–0 Big 12)
- Head coach: Josh Holliday (8th season)
- Assistant coaches: Rob Walton (8th season); Marty Lees (4th season); Matt Holliday (1st season)
- Home stadium: Allie P. Reynolds Stadium; O'Brate Stadium

2020 Big 12 Conference baseball standings
	Conf.				Overall
Team	W		L	PCT	W		L	PCT
No. 3 Texas Tech ‍‍‍	0	–	0	–	16	–	3	.842
No. 22 Texas ‍‍‍	0	–	0	–	14	–	3	.824
No. 13 Oklahoma ‍‍‍	0	–	0	–	14	–	4	.778
TCU ‍‍‍	0	–	0	–	11	–	4	.733
Oklahoma State ‍‍‍	0	–	0	–	13	–	5	.722
West Virginia ‍‍‍	0	–	0	–	11	–	5	.688
Baylor ‍‍‍	0	–	0	–	10	–	6	.625
Kansas State ‍‍‍	0	–	0	–	10	–	7	.588
Kansas ‍‍‍	0	–	0	–	7	–	10	.412
‡ – Tournament champion As of March 15, 2020; Rankings from D1baseball

The 2020 Oklahoma State Cowboys baseball team represented Oklahoma State University during the 2020 NCAA Division I baseball season. The Cowboys played their home games at Allie P. Reynolds Stadium through March 15 and at O'Brate Stadium beginning March 20 as a member of the Big 12 Conference. They were led by head coach Josh Holliday, in his 8th season at Oklahoma State.

On March 13, the Big 12 Conference canceled the remainder of the season due to the Coronavirus pandemic.

== Previous season ==
The 2019 Oklahoma State Cowboys baseball team notched a 32–17 (14–9) regular season record and finished third in the Big 12 Conference standings. The Cowboys reached the 2019 Big 12 Conference baseball tournament championship game, where they defeated West Virginia to claim the program's third Big 12 title. Oklahoma State received the Big 12 Conference's automatic bid to the 2019 NCAA Division I baseball tournament and was selected as one of the sixteen Regional hosts (played in Oklahoma City). The Cowboys defeated Harvard, Nebraska, and Connecticut to win the Oklahoma City Regional but were eliminated from the NCAA tournament by Texas Tech in the Lubbock Super Regional.

== Personnel ==
=== Coaching staff ===
Name	Position	Seasons at Oklahoma State	Alma mater
Josh Holliday	Head coach	8	Oklahoma State University (1999)
Rob Walton	Assistant Coach - Pitching	8	Oklahoma State University (1986)
Marty Lees	Assistant Coach - Recruiting Coordinator	4	Western Oregon University (1994)
Matt Holliday	Volunteer Assistant Coach	1	Stillwater High School (1998)

=== Roster ===
2020 Oklahoma State Cowboys Roster
Pitchers: 3 - Bryce Osmond - Freshman; 5 - Ben Leeper - RS Senior; 6 - Parker Scott - RS Junior; 22 - Mitchell Stone - RS Sophomore; 25 - Roman Phansalkar - RS Sophomore; 27 - Justin Campbell - Freshman; 30 - John Kelly - Sophomore; 34 - Jach Cable - RS Junior; 35 - C.J. Varela - Senior; 38 - Wyatt Cheney - Freshman; 40 - Kale Davis - Freshman; 41 - Colton Bowman - Freshman; 43 - Riley Taylor - RS Freshman; 44 - Nate Peterson - Sophomore; 47 - Tucker Elliott - RS Sophomore; 48 - Brett Standlee - RS Sophomore; 49 - Ryan Van Leeuwen - RS Senior; 51 - Jacob Ruder - RS Senior; 53 - Ryan Bogusz - Freshman; 56 - Spencer Cochran - RS Freshman	Catchers: 31 - Nick DeNicola - RS Junior; 33 - Brock Mathis - Junior; 36 - Josh Spiegel - RS Freshman; Infielders: 1 - Hueston Morrill - Sophomore; 4 - Kaden Polcovich - Junior; 7 - Max Hewitt - Senior; 17 - Jake Thompson - RS Junior; 18 - Dylan Gardner - Junior; 19 - Braley Hollins - Sophomore; 23 - Blake Robertson - Freshman; 42 - Alix Garcia - Senior; 45 - Riley Metzger - Junior	Outfielders: 8 - Cam Thompson - Freshman; 12 - Carson McCusker - Senior; 14 - Noah Sifrit - Junior; 15 - Cade Cabbiness - Senior; 28 - Caeden Trenkle - Freshman; 32 - J.T. Mounce - Freshman

== Schedule and results ==
2020 Oklahoma State Cowboys baseball game log
Regular Season (13–5)
February (7–4)

Date	Time (CT)	TV	Opponent	Rank	Stadium	Score	Win	Loss	Save	Attendance	Overall	Big 12	
February 14	7:00 pm	ESPN3	at Grand Canyon*	#19	GCU Ballpark • Phoenix, AZ	**L** 3–10	Mechals (1–0)	**Osmond** (0–1)	–	3,843	0–1	–	Stats; Story
February 15	3:00 pm		at Grand Canyon*	#19	GCU Ballpark • Phoenix, AZ	**W** 6–4	**Scott** (1–0)	Ohl (0–1)	–	1,406	1–1	–	Stats; Story
February 16	2:00 pm		at Grand Canyon*	#19	GCU Ballpark • Phoenix, AZ	**L** 3–9	McCarville (1–0)	**Campbell** (0–1)	–	941	1–2	–	Stats; Story
February 18	7:30 pm		at #11 Arizona State*	#28	Phoenix Municipal Stadium • Phoenix, AZ	**W** 2–1	**Standlee** (1–0)	Tolman (0–1)	**Leeper** (1)	2,403	2–2	–	Stats; Story
February 21	4:00 pm	ESPN+	Texas–Rio Grande Valley*	#28	Allie P. Reynolds Stadium • Stillwater, OK	**W** 17–2	**Scott** (2–0)	Stevens (1–1)	–	1,001	3–2	–	Stats; Story
February 22	1:00 pm		Texas–Rio Grande Valley*	#28	Allie P. Reynolds Stadium • Stillwater, OK	**W** 11–7	**Davis** (1–0)	Aldaz (0–1)	–	1,678	4–2	–	Stats; Story
February 23	12:00 pm	ESPN+	Texas–Rio Grande Valley*	#28	Allie P. Reynolds Stadium • Stillwater, OK	**W** 8–4	**Varela** (1–0)	Ramos (0–2)	**Standlee** (1)	456	5–2	–	Stats; Story
February 25	3:00 pm	ESPN+	Little Rock*	#28	Allie P. Reynolds Stadium • Stillwater, OK	**W** 9–1	**Bowman** (1–0)	Beardsley (0–1)	–	462	6–2	–	Stats; Story
February 26	3:00 pm		Little Rock*	#28	Allie P. Reynolds Stadium • Stillwater, OK	**W** 12–0	**Varela** (2–0)	Smith (2–1)	–	188	7–2	–	Stats; Story
February 28	3:00 pm		#1 UCLA*	#28	Dr Pepper Ballpark • Frisco, TX	**L** 1–8	Pettway (2–0)	**Scott** (2–1)	–	1,100	7–3	–	Stats; Story
February 29	2:00 pm		Illinois*	#28	Dr Pepper Ballpark • Frisco, TX	**L** 2–4	Kirschsieper (2–0)	**Campbell** (0–2)	Acton (4)		7–4	–	Stats; Story

March (6–1)

Date	Time (CT)	TV	Opponent	Rank	Stadium	Score	Win	Loss	Save	Attendance	Overall	Big 12	
March 1	3:00 pm		#15 Texas A&M*	#28	Dr Pepper Ballpark • Frisco, TX	**W** 8–5	**Leeper** (1–0)	Miller (0–2)	–	8,487	8–4	–	Stats; Story
March 3	4:00 pm		Missouri State*		Allie P. Reynolds Stadium • Stillwater, OK	**L** 10–11	Juenger (1–0)	**Cable** (0–1)	–	405	8–5	–	Stats; Story
March 5	4:00 pm	ESPN+	BYU*		Allie P. Reynolds Stadium • Stillwater, OK	**W** 2–0	**Scott** (3–1)	McKeehan (1–1)	**Leeper** (2)	382	9–5	–	Stats; Story
March 6	4:00 pm	ESPN+	BYU*		Allie P. Reynolds Stadium • Stillwater, OK	**W** 6–1	**Campbell** (1–2)	Nielson (0–3)	–	672	10–5	–	Stats; Story
March 7	2:00 pm		BYU*		Allie P. Reynolds Stadium • Stillwater, OK	**W** 8–3	**Osmond** (1–1)	McLaughlin (2–2)	–	1,320	11–5	–	Stats; Story
March 10	4:00 pm	ESPN+	Saint Louis*		Allie P. Reynolds Stadium • Stillwater, OK	**W** 22–4	**Davis** (2–0)	Nolan (0–1)	–	320	12–5	–	Stats; Story
March 11	4:00 pm		Saint Louis*		Allie P. Reynolds Stadium • Stillwater, OK	**W** 7–1	**Varela** (3–0)	Balandis (0–1)	–	420	13–5	–	Stats; Story
March 13	6:00 pm		Fresno State*		Allie P. Reynolds Stadium • Stillwater, OK								
March 14	2:00 pm		Fresno State*		Allie P. Reynolds Stadium • Stillwater, OK								
March 15	1:00 pm	ESPN+	Fresno State*		Allie P. Reynolds Stadium • Stillwater, OK								
March 17	6:30 pm		at Dallas Baptist*		Horner Ballpark • Dallas, TX								
March 20	6:00 pm	ESPN+	TCU		O'Brate Stadium • Stillwater, OK								
March 21	3:00 pm	ESPN+	TCU		O'Brate Stadium • Stillwater, OK								
March 22	1:00 pm	ESPN+	TCU		O'Brate Stadium • Stillwater, OK								
March 24	6:00 pm	ESPN+	Wichita State*		O'Brate Stadium • Stillwater, OK								
March 27	7:00 pm	LHN	at Texas		UFCU Disch–Falk Field • Austin, TX								
March 28	5:30 pm	LHN	at Texas		UFCU Disch–Falk Field • Austin, TX								
March 29	1:00 pm	LHN	at Texas		UFCU Disch–Falk Field • Austin, TX								
March 31	6:30 pm		Oklahoma		ONEOK Field • Tulsa, OK								

April (0–0)

Date	Time (CT)	TV	Opponent	Rank	Stadium	Score	Win	Loss	Save	Attendance	Overall	Big 12
April 3	8:00 pm	ESPNU	Texas Tech		O'Brate Stadium • Stillwater, OK							
April 4	3:00 pm	ESPN+	Texas Tech		O'Brate Stadium • Stillwater, OK							
April 5	1:00 pm	ESPN+	Texas Tech		O'Brate Stadium • Stillwater, OK							
April 7	6:00 pm		at Wichita State*		Eck Stadium • Wichita, KS							
April 9	6:00 pm	ESPN+	at Kansas State		Tointon Family Stadium • Manhattan, KS							
April 10	6:00 pm	ESPN+	at Kansas State		Tointon Family Stadium • Manhattan, KS							
April 11	4:00 pm	ESPN+	at Kansas State		Tointon Family Stadium • Manhattan, KS							
April 14	6:00 pm	ESPN+	Oral Roberts*		O'Brate Stadium • Stillwater, OK							
April 17	6:30 pm		at Oklahoma		L. Dale Mitchell Baseball Park • Norman, OK							
April 18	6:00 pm	ESPN+	Oklahoma		O'Brate Stadium • Stillwater, OK							
April 19	4:00 pm	ESPNU	Oklahoma		O'Brate Stadium • Stillwater, OK							
April 21	6:00 pm	ESPN+	Dallas Baptist*		O'Brate Stadium • Stillwater, OK							
April 24	5:30 pm		at West Virginia		Monongalia County Ballpark • Morgantown, WV							
April 25	3:00 pm		at West Virginia		Monongalia County Ballpark • Morgantown, WV							
April 26	12:00 pm		at West Virginia		Monongalia County Ballpark • Morgantown, WV							
April 28	6:00 pm		at Oral Roberts*		J. L. Johnson Stadium • Tulsa, OK							

May (0–0)

Date	Time (CT)	TV	Opponent	Rank	Stadium	Score	Win	Loss	Save	Attendance	Overall	Big 12
May 1	6:00 pm	ESPN+	Oregon State*		O'Brate Stadium • Stillwater, OK							
May 2	5:00 pm	ESPNU	Oregon State*		O'Brate Stadium • Stillwater, OK							
May 3	1:00 pm	ESPN+	Oregon State*		O'Brate Stadium • Stillwater, OK							
May 8	6:00 pm	ESPN+	Kansas		O'Brate Stadium • Stillwater, OK							
May 9	3:00 pm	ESPN+	Kansas		O'Brate Stadium • Stillwater, OK							
May 10	1:00 pm	ESPN+	Kansas		O'Brate Stadium • Stillwater, OK							
May 12	6:00 pm	ESPN+	Central Arkansas*		O'Brate Stadium • Stillwater, OK							
May 14	6:30 pm	ESPN+	at Baylor		Baylor Ballpark • Waco, TX							
May 15	6:30 pm	ESPN+	at Baylor		Baylor Ballpark • Waco, TX							
May 16	TBA	ESPN+	at Baylor		Baylor Ballpark • Waco, TX							

Legend: = Win = Loss = Canceled Bold = Oklahoma State team member
"#" represents ranking. All rankings from Collegiate Baseball on the date of the contest.
"()" represents postseason seeding in the Big 12 Tournament or NCAA Regional, respectively.

== Rankings ==
Ranking movements Legend: ██ Increase in ranking ██ Decrease in ranking — = Not ranked RV = Received votes
	Week																		
Poll	Pre	1	2	3	4	5	6	7	8	9	10	11	12	13	14	15	16	17	Final
Coaches'	17	17*		RV	RV														
Baseball America	16	24	23	—	—														
Collegiate Baseball^	19	28	28	—	—														
NCBWA†	18	29	28	RV	RV														
D1Baseball	22	—	—	—	—														

^ Collegiate Baseball ranked 40 teams in their preseason poll, but only ranked 30 teams weekly during the season.
† NCBWA ranks 30 teams in their preseason poll, but only ranks 25 teams weekly during the season.
* A new poll was not released for this week, so for comparison purposes, the previous week's ranking is inserted in this week's slot.

== 2020 MLB draft ==
Player	Position	Round	Overall	MLB team
Kaden Polcovich	2B	3	78	Seattle Mariners
