= 2020 Oklahoma Sooners baseball team =

Baseball team

2020 Oklahoma Sooners baseball
- Conference: Big 12 Conference

Ranking
- Coaches: No. 13
- Record: 14–4 (0–0 Big 12)
- Head coach: Skip Johnson (3rd season)
- Assistant coaches: Clay Overcash (3rd season); Clay Van Hook (3rd season); Britt Bonneau (2nd season)
- Home stadium: L. Dale Mitchell Baseball Park

2020 Big 12 Conference baseball standings
	Conf.				Overall
Team	W		L	PCT	W		L	PCT
No. 3 Texas Tech ‍‍‍	0	–	0	–	16	–	3	.842
No. 22 Texas ‍‍‍	0	–	0	–	14	–	3	.824
No. 13 Oklahoma ‍‍‍	0	–	0	–	14	–	4	.778
TCU ‍‍‍	0	–	0	–	11	–	4	.733
Oklahoma State ‍‍‍	0	–	0	–	13	–	5	.722
West Virginia ‍‍‍	0	–	0	–	11	–	5	.688
Baylor ‍‍‍	0	–	0	–	10	–	6	.625
Kansas State ‍‍‍	0	–	0	–	10	–	7	.588
Kansas ‍‍‍	0	–	0	–	7	–	10	.412
‡ – Tournament champion As of March 15, 2020; Rankings from D1baseball

The 2020 Oklahoma Sooners baseball team represented the University of Oklahoma during the 2020 NCAA Division I baseball season. The Sooners played their home games at L. Dale Mitchell Baseball Park as a member of the Big 12 Conference. They were led by head coach Skip Johnson, in his 3rd season at Oklahoma.

On March 13, the Big 12 Conference canceled the remainder of the season due to the Coronavirus pandemic.

== Previous season ==
The 2019 Oklahoma Sooners baseball team notched a 33–21 (11–13) regular season record and finished sixth in the Big 12 Conference standings. The Sooners reached the 2019 Big 12 Conference baseball tournament, where they were defeated by Baylor and TCU. Oklahoma did not receive an at-large bid to the 2019 NCAA Division I baseball tournament.

== Personnel ==
=== Coaching staff ===
Name	Position	Seasons at Oklahoma	Alma mater
Skip Johnson	Head coach	3	University of Texas–Pan American (1990)
Clay Overcash	Assistant Coach	3	University of South Carolina Upstate (1990)
Clay Van Hook	Assistant Coach	3	University of Texas at Austin (2007)
Britt Bonneau	Volunteer Assistant Coach	2	University of Oklahoma (1992)

=== Roster ===
2020 Oklahoma Sooners Roster
Pitchers: 15 - Wyatt Olds - Sophomore; 17 - Aaron Brooks - Junior; 18 - Ledgend Smith - Junior; 22 - Braxton Webb - Senior; 23 - Jaret Godman - Sophomore; 24 - Cade Cavalli - Junior; 25 - Levi Prater - Junior; 26 - Brad Demco - Senior; 28 - Dane Acker - Junior; 30 - Jacob Loflin - Freshman; 31 - Christian Ruebeck - Freshman; 32 - Zack Matthews - Junior; 34 - Michael Betrus - RS Freshman; 42 - Carson Carter - RS Junior; 43 - Jason Ruffcorn - Senior; 45 - Ben Abram - Sophomore; 54 - Jake Bennett - Freshman	Catchers: 14 - Justin Mitchell - Junior; 40 - Brady Lindsly - Senior; Infielders: 2 - Trent Brown - RS Sophomore; 4 - Brandon Zaragoza - Senior; 5 - Conor McKenna - Senior; 11 - Carter LaValley - Freshman; 13 - Logan Kohler - Freshman; 20 - Peyton Graham - Freshman; 36 - Tyler Hardman - Junior; 39 - Braxton Bohrofen - RS Freshman	Outfielders: 1 - Diego Muniz - Sophomore; 6 - Connor Beichler - Freshman; 7 - Kendall Pettis - Freshman; 10 - Tanner Tredaway - Junior; 16 - Vinny Bologna - Junior; 21 - Brady Harlan - Senior; 27 - Jordan Vujovich - RS Junior; 29 - Luke Quick - Junior

== Schedule and results ==
2020 Oklahoma Sooners baseball game log
Regular season (14–4)
February (8–3)

Date	Time (CT)	TV	Opponent	Rank	Stadium	Score	Win	Loss	Save	Attendance	Overall	Big 12	
February 14	6:00 pm		Virginia*	#30	Admiral Fetterman Field • Pensacola, FL	**L** 0–6	McGarry (1–0)	**Cavalli** (0–1)		780	0–1	–	Stats; Story
February 15	1:00 pm		Virginia*	#30	Admiral Fetterman Field • Pensacola, FL	**W** 7–2	**Matthews** (1–0)	Harrington (0–1)			1–1	–	Stats; Story
February 15	4:00 pm		Virginia*	#30	Admiral Fetterman Field • Pensacola, FL	**W** 5–1	**Olds** (1–0)	Schoch (0–1)	**Ruffcorn** (1)	1,422	2–1	–	Stats; Story
February 18	3:00 pm		Texas Southern*		L. Dale Mitchell Baseball Park • Norman, OK	**W** 14–1	**Abram** (1–0)	Hansen (0–1)		392	3–1	–	Stats; Story
February 19	3:00 pm		Texas Southern*		L. Dale Mitchell Baseball Park • Norman, OK	**W** 12–1	**Bennett** (1–0)	Kindervater (0–2)		407	4–1	–	Stats; Story
February 21	3:00 pm		Illinois State*		L. Dale Mitchell Baseball Park • Norman, OK	**W** 2–1	**Cavalli** (1–1)	Johnson (0–2)	**Ruffcorn** (2)		5–1	–	Stats; Story
February 21	6:00 pm		Illinois State*		L. Dale Mitchell Baseball Park • Norman, OK	**W** 4–1	**Olds** (2–0)	Wicklund (0–1)	**Ruffcorn** (3)	591	6–1	–	Stats; Story
February 22	12:00 pm		Illinois State*		L. Dale Mitchell Baseball Park • Norman, OK	**W** 3–2	**Brooks** (1–0)	Kubiatowicz (0–1)	**Godman** (1)		7–1	–	Stats; Story
February 22	3:00 pm		Illinois State*		L. Dale Mitchell Baseball Park • Norman, OK	**L** 5–7	Sebby (1–0)	**Acker** (0–1)	Bronke (1)	794	7–2	–	Stats; Story
February 28	3:00 pm		Arkansas*		Minute Maid Park • Houston, TX	**W** 6–3	**Olds** (3–0)	Kopps (0–1)	**Ruffcorn** (4)		8–2	–	Stats; Story
February 29	11:00 am		Missouri*		Minute Maid Park • Houston, TX	**L** 7–8^{10}	Dillard (2–0)	**Brooks** (1–1)	–	521	8–3	–	Stats; Story

March (6–1)

Date	Time (CT)	TV	Opponent	Rank	Stadium	Score	Win	Loss	Save	Attendance	Overall	Big 12	
March 1	11:00 am		#19 LSU*		Minute Maid Park • Houston, TX	**W** 1–0	**Acker** (1–1)	Labas (1–2)	–		9–3	–	Stats; Story
March 3	6:30 pm		Dallas Baptist*	#28	L. Dale Mitchell Baseball Park • Norman, OK	**W** 10–3	**Olds** (4–0)	Heaton (1–2)	–	773	10–3	–	Stats; Story
March 4	6:30 pm		Arkansas–Pine Bluff*	#28	L. Dale Mitchell Baseball Park • Norman, OK	**W** 13–2	**Bennett** (2–0)	Barker (0–2)	–	588	11–3	–	Stats; Story
March 6	6:30 pm		San Diego State*	#28	L. Dale Mitchell Baseball Park • Norman, OK	**L** 4–5	Paredes (1–1)	**Cavalli** (1–2)	Schmitt (6)	919	11–4	–	Stats; Story
March 7	2:00 pm		San Diego State*	#28	L. Dale Mitchell Baseball Park • Norman, OK	**W** 8–4	**Prater** (1–0)	Melton (3–1)	–	1,311	12–4	–	Stats; Story
March 8	1:00 pm		San Diego State*	#28	L. Dale Mitchell Baseball Park • Norman, OK	**W** 9–8^{10}	**Ruffcorn** (1–0)	Schmitt (0–1)	–	699	13–4	–	Stats; Story
March 10	6:30 pm		at UT Arlington*	#28	Clay Gould Ballpark • Arlington, TX	**W** 3–0	**Bennett** (3–0)	Winquest (1–1)	**Ruffcorn** (5)	936	14–4	–	Stats; Story
March 12	8:00 pm		at Cal Poly*	#28	Robin Baggett Stadium • San Luis Obispo, CA								
March 13	8:00 pm		at Cal Poly*	#28	Robin Baggett Stadium • San Luis Obispo, CA								
March 14	6:00 pm		at Cal Poly*	#28	Robin Baggett Stadium • San Luis Obispo, CA								
March 15	3:00 pm		at Cal Poly*	#28	Robin Baggett Stadium • San Luis Obispo, CA								
March 17	6:00 pm		Arkansas*		Chickasaw Bricktown Ballpark • Oklahoma City, OK								
March 20	6:30 pm		Texas		L. Dale Mitchell Baseball Park • Norman, OK								
March 21	2:00 pm	FSOK	Texas		L. Dale Mitchell Baseball Park • Norman, OK								
March 22	2:00 pm	FSOK	Texas		L. Dale Mitchell Baseball Park • Norman, OK								
March 24	6:30 pm		at Dallas Baptist*		Horner Ballpark • Dallas, TX								
March 27	6:30 pm		at TCU		Lupton Stadium • Fort Worth, TX								
March 28	2:00 pm	FSSW+	at TCU		Lupton Stadium • Fort Worth, TX								
March 29	12:00 pm	ESPNU	at TCU		Lupton Stadium • Fort Worth, TX								
March 31	6:30 pm		Oklahoma State		ONEOK Field • Tulsa, OK								

April (0–0)

Date	Time (CT)	TV	Opponent	Rank	Stadium	Score	Win	Loss	Save	Attendance	Overall	Big 12
April 3	6:30 pm	FSOK+	Baylor		L. Dale Mitchell Baseball Park • Norman, OK							
April 4	6:30 pm	ESPNU	Baylor		L. Dale Mitchell Baseball Park • Norman, OK							
April 5	2:00 pm	FSSW+	Baylor		L. Dale Mitchell Baseball Park • Norman, OK							
April 7	6:30 pm		Oral Roberts*		L. Dale Mitchell Baseball Park • Norman, OK							
April 9	6:30 pm	FSSW	at Texas Tech		Dan Law Field • Lubbock, TX							
April 10	8:00 pm	ESPNU	at Texas Tech		Dan Law Field • Lubbock, TX							
April 11	2:00 pm	FSSW+	at Texas Tech		Dan Law Field • Lubbock, TX							
April 14	6:00 pm	FSOK+	Wichita State*		L. Dale Mitchell Baseball Park • Norman, OK							
April 17	6:30 pm	FSOK+	Oklahoma State		L. Dale Mitchell Baseball Park • Norman, OK							
April 18	6:00 pm	ESPN+	at Oklahoma State		O'Brate Stadium • Stillwater, OK							
April 19	4:00 pm	ESPNU	at Oklahoma State		O'Brate Stadium • Stillwater, OK							
April 21	6:00 pm		at Oral Roberts*		J. L. Johnson Stadium • Tulsa, OK							
April 24	6:30 pm		Sam Houston State*		L. Dale Mitchell Baseball Park • Norman, OK							
April 25	2:00 pm	FSOK	Sam Houston State*		L. Dale Mitchell Baseball Park • Norman, OK							
April 26	1:00 pm		Sam Houston State*		L. Dale Mitchell Baseball Park • Norman, OK							
April 28	6:00 pm		at Wichita State*		Eck Stadium • Wichita, KS							

May (0–0)

Date	Time (CT)	TV	Opponent	Rank	Stadium	Score	Win	Loss	Save	Attendance	Overall	Big 12
May 1	6:00 pm		at Kansas		Hoglund Ballpark • Lawrence, KS							
May 2	2:00 pm		at Kansas		Hoglund Ballpark • Lawrence, KS							
May 3	1:00 pm		at Kansas		Hoglund Ballpark • Lawrence, KS							
May 8	6:30 pm		Kansas State		L. Dale Mitchell Baseball Park • Norman, OK							
May 9	4:00 pm	FSOK+	Kansas State		L. Dale Mitchell Baseball Park • Norman, OK							
May 10	1:00 pm		Kansas State		L. Dale Mitchell Baseball Park • Norman, OK							
May 14	6:30 pm	FSOK+	West Virginia		L. Dale Mitchell Baseball Park • Norman, OK							
May 15	6:30 pm		West Virginia		L. Dale Mitchell Baseball Park • Norman, OK							
May 16	2:00 pm	FSOK	West Virginia		L. Dale Mitchell Baseball Park • Norman, OK							

Legend: = Win = Loss = Canceled Bold = Oklahoma team member
"#" represents ranking. All rankings from Collegiate Baseball on the date of the contest.
"()" represents postseason seeding in the Big 12 Tournament or NCAA Regional, respectively.

== Rankings ==
Ranking movements Legend: ██ Increase in ranking ██ Decrease in ranking — = Not ranked RV = Received votes
	Week																		
Poll	Pre	1	2	3	4	5	6	7	8	9	10	11	12	13	14	15	16	17	Final
Coaches'	RV	RV*		16	13														
Baseball America	19	16	15	11	9														
Collegiate Baseball^	30	—	—	28	28														
NCBWA†	24	24	20	15	12														
D1Baseball	24	23	22	15	13														

^ Collegiate Baseball ranked 40 teams in their preseason poll, but only ranked 30 teams weekly during the season.
† NCBWA ranks 30 teams in their preseason poll, but only ranks 25 teams weekly during the season.
* A new poll was not released for this week, so for comparison purposes, the previous week's ranking is inserted in this week's slot.

== 2020 MLB draft ==
Player	Position	Round	Overall	MLB team
Cade Cavalli	RHP	1	22	Washington Nationals
Levi Prater	LHP	3	93	St. Louis Cardinals
Brady Lindsly	C	4	123	Washington Nationals
Dane Acker	RHP	4	127	Oakland Athletics
