= Ceremonial first pitch =

Traditional event in baseball

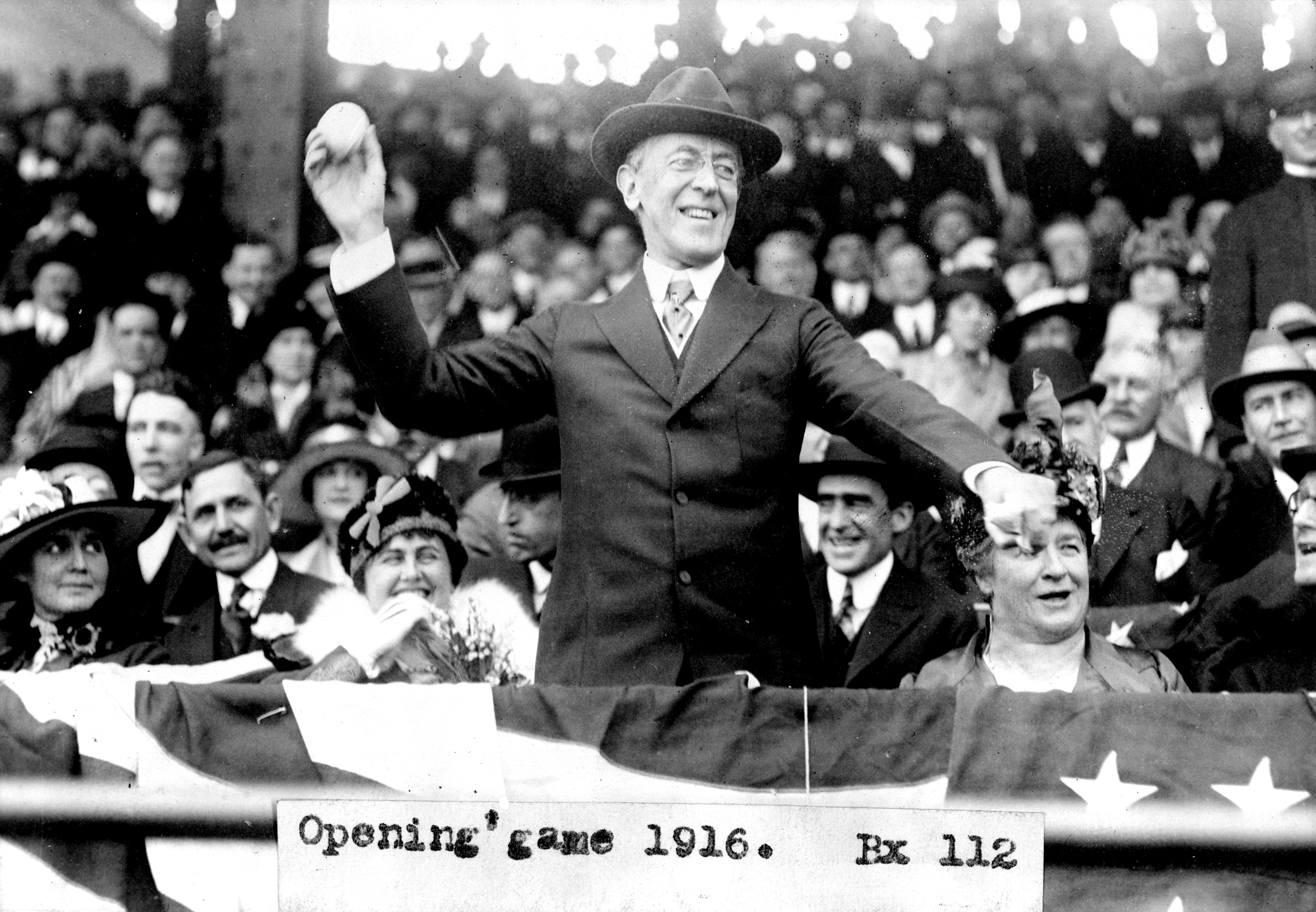
Woodrow Wilson, 1916

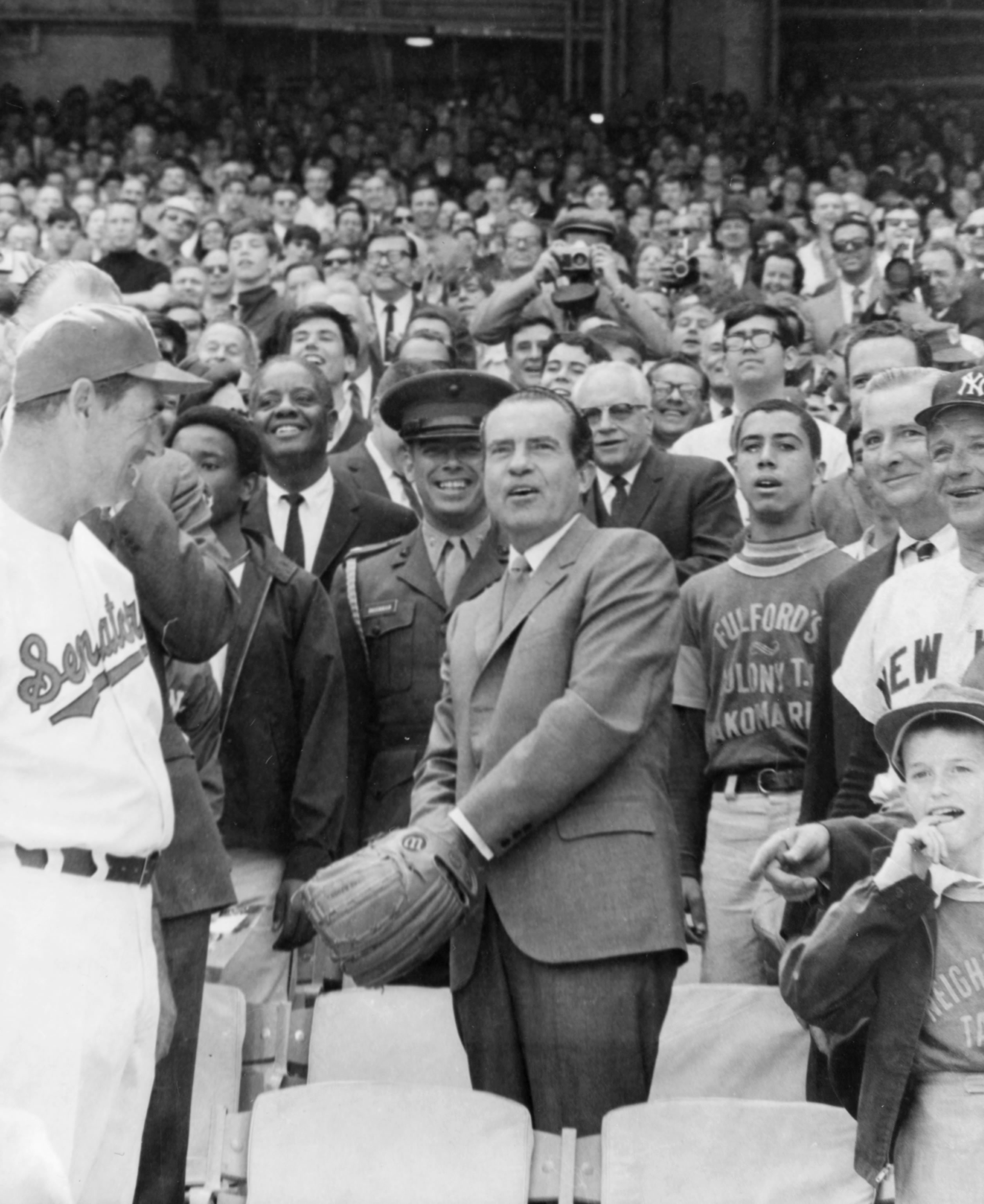
Richard Nixon, 1969

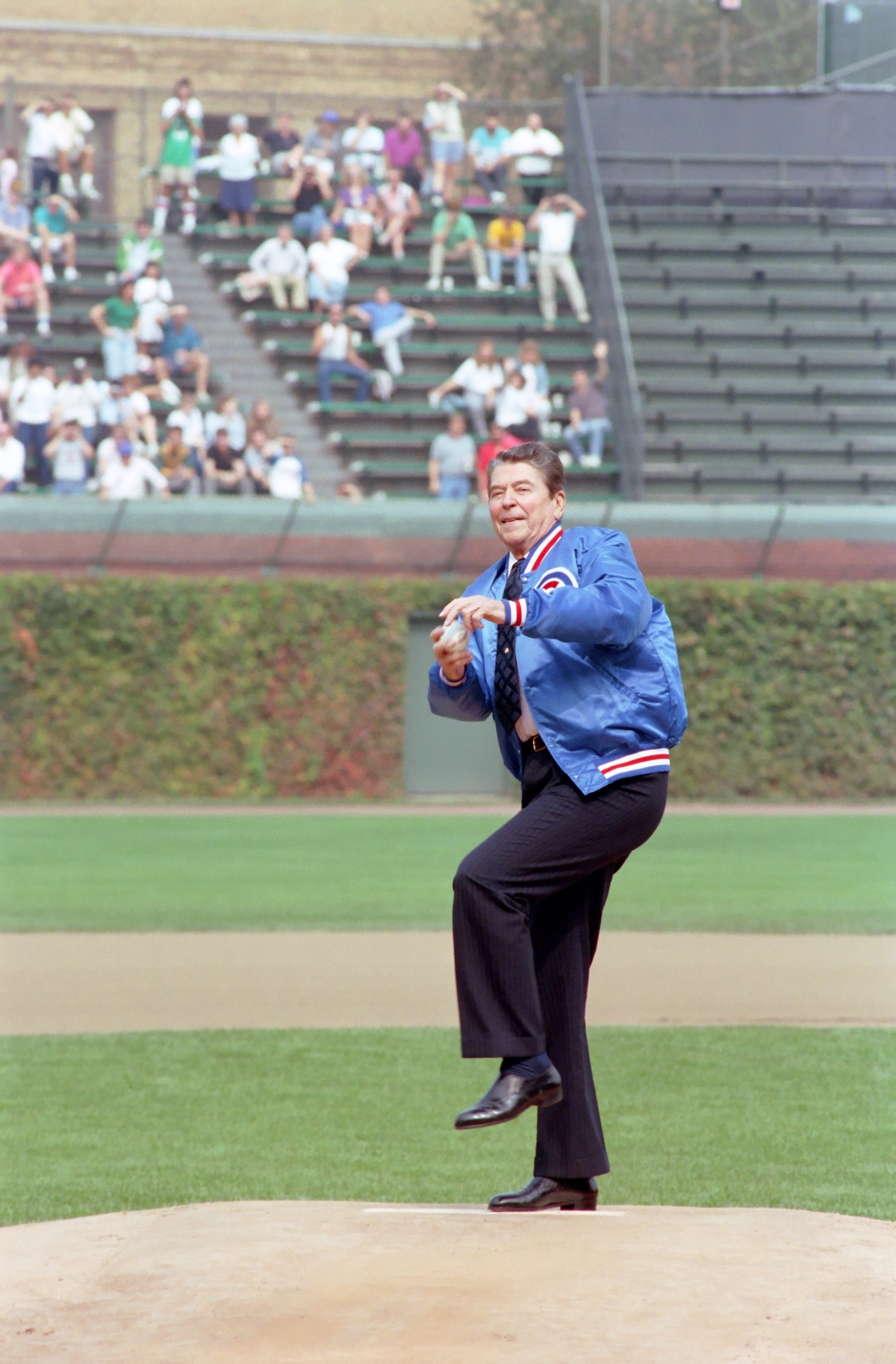
Ronald Reagan, 1988

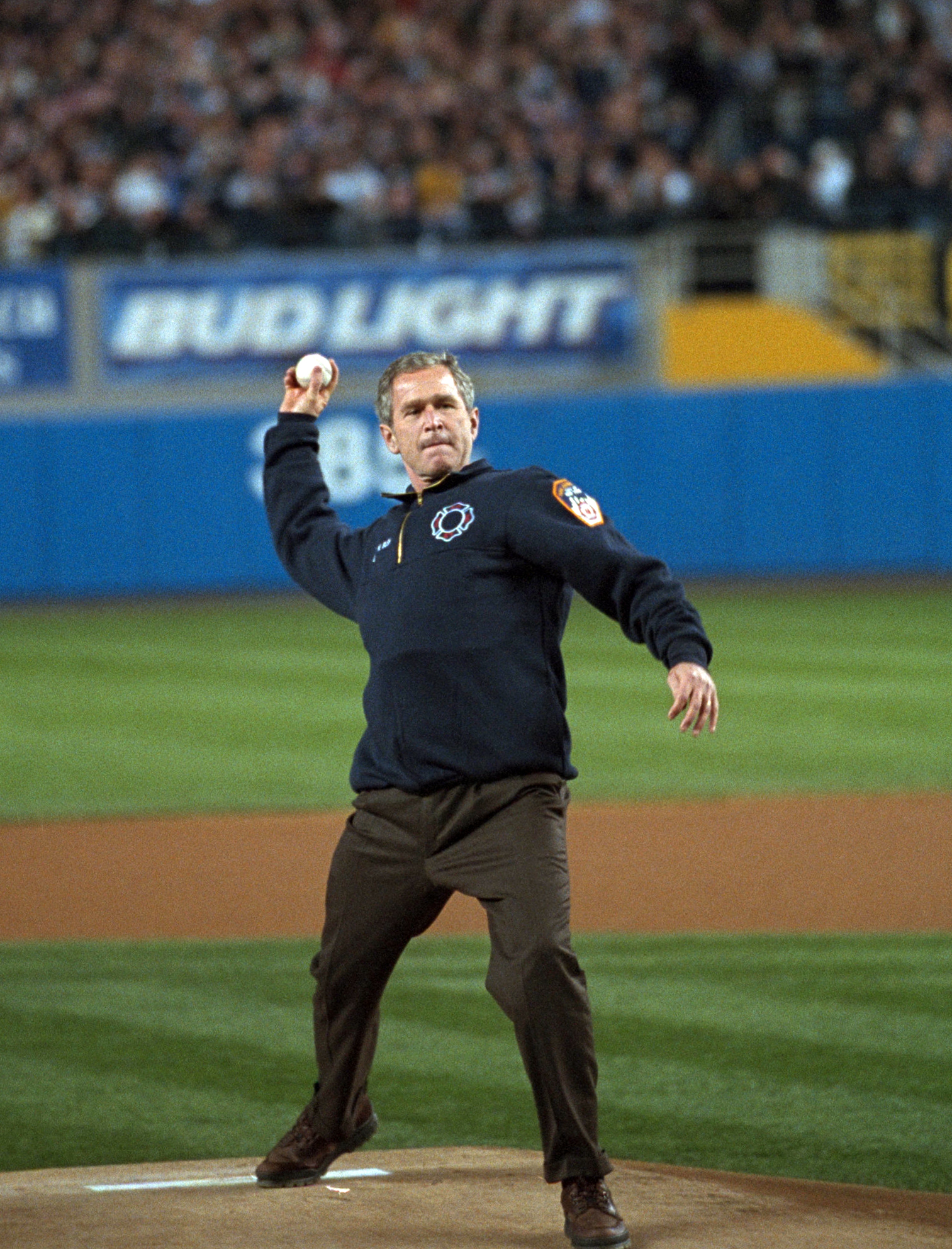
George W. Bush, 2001 World Series

The ceremonial first pitch is a longstanding event in baseball in which a guest of honor throws a ball to mark the end of pregame festivities and the start of the game. Originally, the guest threw a ball from their seat in the grandstand to the pitcher or catcher of the home team, but the ritual changed after United States President Ronald Reagan threw the first pitch on the field at an unscheduled appearance at a 1988 Baltimore Orioles game. Now, the guest stands on or in front of the pitcher's mound and throws towards home plate. The recipient of the pitch is usually a player from the home team.

The ceremonial thrower may be a notable person (dignitary, celebrity, former player, etc.) who is in attendance, an executive from a company that sponsors the team (especially when that company has sponsored that night's promotional giveaway), or a person who won the first pitch opportunity as a contest prize. Often, especially in the minor leagues, multiple first pitches are made.

== History ==
The practice of having ceremonial first pitches dates back to at least 1890, when throwers were often a mayor, governor, or other locally notable individual. Ohio Governor (and future U.S. president) William McKinley, for example, "threw the ball into the diamond" before an opening day game between Toledo and Columbus in 1892. Former Japanese Prime Minister Ōkuma Shigenobu threw out the ceremonial first pitch at the first game of an American All-Star team's tour of Japan in 1908, making him possibly the first person who had served as a national head of government to throw out a first pitch.

Ceremonial first pitches during the World Series are subject to the Commissioner of Baseball's approval. Section 7.13 of the World Series Manual states, "All first-ball throwers are subject to final approval of the commissioner. Recommendations are solicited from the participating clubs, but no commitments should be made until approval has been received. The use of politicians, movie stars, etc., will not be approved except in rare or unusual circumstances." Baltimore Orioles owner Jerold Hoffberger was fined $2,500 for allowing Maryland Governor Harry Hughes to throw out the first pitch before Game 2 of the 1979 World Series over the objections of Commissioner Bowie Kuhn.

On April 23, 2012, the Texas Rangers executed a unique twist on the first pitch tradition. Before the Rangers' home game against the New York Yankees, the team held an official retirement ceremony for longtime catcher Iván Rodríguez. Instead of going to the pitcher's mound, he went behind home plate and threw the first "pitch" to longtime teammate Michael Young, who was standing at second base.

On July 23, 2020, Dr. Anthony Fauci, director of the National Institute of Allergy and Infectious Diseases, threw the first pitch of the 2020 MLB season after it was delayed due to the COVID-19 pandemic.

On June 9, 2024, during the second game of the London Series, instead of a ceremonial first pitch, Kaitlin Olson threw the ball to Rob McElhenney at shortstop, who then threw it to Bryce Harper on first base for the first "ceremonial double play".

On August 21, 2024, at a New York Mets home game against the Orioles, New York-based comedian Eitan Levine threw his 40th first pitch to break the Guinness World Record for ceremonial first pitches in a professional baseball season. The proceeds from this endeavor were donated to the Make-a-Wish foundation.

On April 4, 2026, which was the Washington Nationals' 21st anniversary of their first game in Washington, DC after relocating from Montreal, lifelong Nationals fan Sorcha Lewis, who was celebrating her 21st birthday on that same day, was invited to take a ceremonial “first sip” of Budweiser, rather than throw a ceremonial first pitch, on the mound before their inaugural home game of that season against the Los Angeles Dodgers.

During the final weekend of the Detroit Tigers' 2026 season, in which the Tigers were hosting the Pittsburgh Pirates, the team planned several events to celebrate the career of starting pitcher Justin Verlander, who had played with the Tigers in his first 13 MLB seasons and had returned to the team for what would be his last season before retiring. Before the series opener on September 25, Verlander took a position on the infield in front of home plate as a catcher, with his 7-year-old daughter Genevieve throwing to him from the mound.

In Banana Ball, the baseball variant developed by the Savannah Bananas in the early-to-mid 2020s, ceremonial first pitches affect the first batter's starting count.

== Presidential first pitches ==
The American tradition of presidential first pitches began in 1910, when United States President William Howard Taft threw the ceremonial first pitch at the Washington Senators' Opening Day at Griffith Stadium. Every president since, with the exceptions of Donald Trump and Joe Biden, has thrown out at least one ceremonial first pitch during or after their presidency, either for Opening Day, the All-Star Game, or the World Series, usually with much fanfare. Jimmy Carter, Trump, and Biden are the only presidents to not throw a ceremonial first pitch for an Opening Day during their presidency, though Carter did so after he left office. Trump had previously done one prior to his presidency for the minor league Somerset Patriots.

President Franklin D. Roosevelt has thrown the most presidential first pitches while in office at 11, while Presidents George H. W. Bush and George W. Bush have each thrown 14 first pitches overall, including those thrown before and after holding the office.

‡	First pitch by a future president
^	First pitch by a former president
*	First pitch by a vice president

Presidential First Pitches
Event	President	Ballpark	Notes
1910 Opening Day	William Howard Taft	National Park	First sitting president to participate in Opening Day ceremonies; preceded Washington Nationals–Philadelphia Athletics game on April 14.
1911 Opening Day	William Howard Taft	National Park	The National Park where the first-ever presidential ceremonial first pitch was thrown burned down in March 1911, and a new stadium, also called National Park at first, was built in its place. It would be renamed Griffith Stadium in 1923.
1912 Opening Day	James S. Sherman (Vice President)*	National Park	Taft did not attend because of the death of his friend Archibald Butt in the Titanic disaster.
1913 Opening Day	Woodrow Wilson	National Park	
1915 Opening Day	Woodrow Wilson	National Park	
1915 World Series	Woodrow Wilson	Baker Bowl	Wilson's first public appearance with then-fiancée Edith since their engagement.
1916 Home Opener	Woodrow Wilson	National Park	Nationals defeated New York Yankees on April 20.
1921 Opening Day	Warren G. Harding	Griffith Stadium	First loss for the Nationals with a president throwing out the first ball.
1922 Opening Day	Warren G. Harding	Griffith Stadium	
1923 Opening Day	Warren G. Harding	Yankee Stadium	
1923 Home Opener	Warren G. Harding	Griffith Stadium	Done two days after his first pitch at Yankee Stadium.
1924 Opening Day	Calvin Coolidge	Griffith Stadium	
1924 World Series	Calvin Coolidge	Griffith Stadium	
1925 Opening Day	Calvin Coolidge	Griffith Stadium	
1925 World Series	Calvin Coolidge	Griffith Stadium	
1927 Opening Day	Calvin Coolidge	Griffith Stadium	
1928 Opening Day	Calvin Coolidge	Griffith Stadium	Coolidge left after the first inning due to cold weather.
1929 Opening Day	Herbert Hoover	Griffith Stadium	
1929 World Series	Herbert Hoover	Shibe Park	Held two weeks before the Wall Street crash of 1929.
1930 Opening Day	Herbert Hoover	Griffith Stadium	
1930 World Series	Herbert Hoover	Shibe Park	
1931 Opening Day	Herbert Hoover	Shibe Park	Hoover was received by a mixed audience, with some opposed to Prohibition chanting "We want beer!"
1932 Opening Day	Herbert Hoover	Griffith Stadium	
1933 Opening Day	Franklin D. Roosevelt	Griffith Stadium	
1933 World Series	Franklin D. Roosevelt	Griffith Stadium	
1934 Opening Day	Franklin D. Roosevelt	Griffith Stadium	
1935 Opening Day	Franklin D. Roosevelt	Griffith Stadium	
1936 Opening Day	Franklin D. Roosevelt	Griffith Stadium	
1936 World Series	Franklin D. Roosevelt	Yankee Stadium	
1937 Opening Day	Franklin D. Roosevelt	Griffith Stadium	A plane flew overhead carrying a banner reading "Play the game, don't pack the court," in protest of Roosevelt's failed Judicial Procedures Reform Bill of 1937.
1937 All-Star Game	Franklin D. Roosevelt	Griffith Stadium	
1938 Opening Day	Franklin D. Roosevelt	Griffith Stadium	
1940 Opening Day	Franklin D. Roosevelt	Griffith Stadium	Roosevelt's pitch hit a Washington Post camera.
1941 Opening Day	Franklin D. Roosevelt	Griffith Stadium	
1945 World Series	Harry S. Truman	Griffith Stadium	First left-handed presidential ceremonial first pitch.
1946 Opening Day	Harry S. Truman	Griffith Stadium	
1947 Opening Day	Harry S. Truman	Griffith Stadium	
1948 Opening Day	Harry S. Truman	Griffith Stadium	
1949 Opening Day	Harry S. Truman	Griffith Stadium	
1950 Opening Day	Harry S. Truman	Griffith Stadium	Truman threw out two balls, one left-handed and one right-handed.
1951 Opening Day	Harry S. Truman	Griffith Stadium	
1952 Opening Day	Harry S. Truman	Griffith Stadium	
1953 Opening Day	Dwight D. Eisenhower	Griffith Stadium	Eisenhower skipped Opening Day to play golf at Augusta National, but the game was postponed by rain and he threw out the first ball at the rescheduled game.
1954 Opening Day	Dwight D. Eisenhower	Griffith Stadium	
1955 Opening Day	Dwight D. Eisenhower	Griffith Stadium	
1955 World Series	Dwight D. Eisenhower	Ebbets Field	
1956 Opening Day	Dwight D. Eisenhower	Griffith Stadium	
1958 Opening Day	Dwight D. Eisenhower	Griffith Stadium	
1958 All-Star Game	Richard Nixon (Vice President)^{‡}	Memorial Stadium	The catcher was Gus Triandos.
1959 Opening Day	Richard Nixon (Vice President)^{‡}	Griffith Stadium	Eisenhower did not attend and was represented by Nixon.
1959 All-Star Game	Richard Nixon (Vice President)^{‡}	Forbes Field	Nixon threw the pitch at the first of that season's two All-Star Games.
1959 Old-Timers' Day	Herbert Hoover (former President)^	Yankee Stadium	
1960 Opening Day	Dwight D. Eisenhower	Griffith Stadium	
1961 Opening Day	John F. Kennedy	Griffith Stadium	
1961 Old-Timers' Day	Herbert Hoover (former President)^	Yankee Stadium	
1962 Opening Day	John F. Kennedy	D.C. Stadium	The recently constructed D.C. Stadium would later be renamed the RFK Stadium after Kennedy's brother Robert F. Kennedy in 1969.
1962 All-Star Game	John F. Kennedy	D.C. Stadium	All-Star Game in Washington, D.C.
1963 Opening Day	John F. Kennedy	D.C. Stadium	
1964 Opening Day	Lyndon B. Johnson	D.C. Stadium	Set a record for most hot dogs eaten by a president on Opening Day: four.
1965 Opening Day	Lyndon B. Johnson	D.C. Stadium	
1966 Opening Day	Hubert Humphrey (Vice President)*	D.C. Stadium	
1966 All-Star Game	Hubert Humphrey (Vice President)*	Busch Memorial Stadium	The temperature at the start of the game was 100 °F (38 °C). Humphrey left the ballpark shortly after the pitch.
1967 Opening Day	Lyndon B. Johnson	D.C. Stadium	
1968 Opening Day	Hubert Humphrey (Vice President)*	D.C. Stadium	Due to low approval, Humphrey attended in-place of Johnson amidst public unrest following the assassination of Martin Luther King Jr.
1969 Opening Day	Richard Nixon	RFK Stadium	Nixon requested the presidential seal to be mounted on his box, causing embarrassment when the seal provided had "president" misspelled.
1969 All-Star Game	Spiro Agnew (Vice President)^{‡}	RFK Stadium	Richard Nixon was scheduled to throw out the first pitch but was unable to attend after the game was postponed by rain. Agnew threw one pitch to National League catcher Johnny Bench and one pitch to American League catcher Bill Freehan.
1970 All-Star Game	Richard Nixon	Riverfront Stadium	All-Star Game in Cincinnati, Ohio.
1973 Opening Day	Richard Nixon	Anaheim Stadium	First Opening Day presidential first pitch outside of Washington, D.C.
1976 Opening Day	Gerald Ford	Arlington Stadium	
1976 All-Star Game	Gerald Ford	Veterans Stadium	Ford threw two pitches (with the first from his right hand and the second from his left) from the stands, one to a representative from the National League and the other to a representative from the American League.
1979 World Series	Jimmy Carter	Memorial Stadium	Baltimore Orioles catcher Rick Dempsey playfully yelled, "Next time, get your ass here before the seventh game," in reference to Carter skipping the Opening Day.
1981 All-Star Game	George H. W. Bush (Vice President)^{‡}	Cleveland Stadium	Bush had hoped he would be pitching to Carlton Fisk but a 13-year-old fan was picked out of the crowd to serve as catcher.
1984 Opening Day	Ronald Reagan	Memorial Stadium	Reagan made an unannounced trip to Baltimore, after it was initially cancelled for security reasons. He watched the game from the third-base dugout.
1986 Opening Day	Ronald Reagan	Memorial Stadium	
1986 All-Star Game	George H. W. Bush (Vice President)^{‡}	Astrodome	Bush's second All-Star Game. The catcher was Gary Carter.
1988 All-Star Game	George H. W. Bush (Vice President)^{‡}	Riverfront Stadium	
August 28, 1988 (Regular Season)	George H. W. Bush (Vice President)^{‡}	Astrodome	Bush left the game after the second inning to attend the funeral of Price Daniel.
September 30, 1988 (Regular Season)	Ronald Reagan	Wrigley Field	Reagan threw two pitches prior to the Chicago Cubs–Pittsburgh Pirates game on September 30, then joined Harry Caray for 1½ innings on the WGN telecast.
1989 Opening Day	George H. W. Bush	Memorial Stadium	President of Egypt Hosni Mubarak was Bush's special guest, but did not partake in the pregame ceremonies. The Baltimore Orioles defeated the Boston Red Sox 5–4 in 11 innings.
April 25, 1989 (Regular Season)	George H. W. Bush	Anaheim Stadium	
June 28, 1989 (Regular Season)	George H. W. Bush	Memorial Stadium	
1989 Japan Series	Ronald Reagan (former President)^	Tokyo Dome	Game 3 between the Kintetsu Buffaloes and Yomiuri Giants.
1990 Opening Day	George H. W. Bush	SkyDome	First Opening Day pitch by a president to be thrown in Canada.
May 24, 1990 (Regular Season)	Dan Quayle (Vice President)*	Wrigley Field	
July 16, 1990 (Regular Season)	George H. W. Bush	Memorial Stadium	
1991 Opening Day	George H. W. Bush	Arlington Stadium	George H.W. Bush's son and future President George W. Bush was owner of the Texas Rangers from 1989-94.
1991 Opening Day	Dan Quayle (Vice President)*	Memorial Stadium	Final Opening Day at Memorial Stadium
1992 Opening Day	George H. W. Bush	Oriole Park at Camden Yards	First MLB game at Camden Yards. Bush was joined by his 15-year-old grandson, George P. Bush.
1992 All-Star Game	George H. W. Bush	Jack Murphy Stadium	Threw first pitch with Ted Williams.
1992 World Series	Jimmy Carter (former President)^	Atlanta–Fulton County Stadium	
1993 Opening Day	Bill Clinton	Oriole Park at Camden Yards	Before this, most presidents threw from the stands or at the base of the pitcher's mound; Clinton was the first president to successfully throw from the pitcher's mound to the catcher.
1993 Opening Day	Al Gore (Vice President)*	Atlanta-Fulton County Stadium	
1994 Opening Day	Bill Clinton	Jacobs Field	First MLB Game at Jacobs Field.
1995 World Series	Jimmy Carter (former President)^	Atlanta–Fulton County Stadium	
1996 Opening Day	Bill Clinton	Oriole Park at Camden Yards	
1997 Opening Day	Bill Clinton	Shea Stadium	
2000 Opening Day	Bill Clinton	Pacific Bell Park	
2000 Opening Day	George W. Bush (as Governor of Texas)^{‡}	The Ballpark in Arlington	Future 43rd president
2001 Opening Day	George W. Bush	Miller Park	MLB Commissioner Bud Selig (a former owner of the Brewers) threw out the first pitch to celebrate the opening of the new park; Bush threw the second pitch.
2001 World Series	George W. Bush	Yankee Stadium	This was the first World Series game in New York since the September 11 attacks; Bush wore a bulletproof vest and a Secret Service agent dressed as an umpire so he could be on the field.
2003 Opening Day	George H. W. Bush (former President)^	Great American Ball Park	
2004 Opening Day	Jimmy Carter (former President)^	Petco Park	First MLB Game at Petco Park
2004 Opening Day	George W. Bush	Busch Memorial Stadium	
2004 Opening Day	Dick Cheney (Vice President)*	Great American Ball Park	
2005 Opening Day	George W. Bush	RFK Stadium	2005 was the Nationals' first season, making Bush the first president to throw out first pitch in Washington since Richard Nixon in 1969.
2005 American League Championship Series	Barack Obama (as United States Senator from Illinois)^{‡}	U.S. Cellular Field	Future 44th president
2006 Opening Day	George W. Bush	Great American Ball Park	First sitting president to participate on Opening Day in Cincinnati; preceded Reds–Cubs game on April 3.
2006 Opening Day	Dick Cheney (Vice President)*	RFK Stadium	
August 18, 2006 (Regular Season)	Donald Trump (future President)^{‡}	Fenway Park	Trump, who would become the 45th president, threw out the first pitch before the nightcap of a doubleheader to publicize The Jimmy Fund.
2008 Opening Day	George W. Bush	Nationals Park	This was the first pitch in the new stadium. Bush also participated in ESPN's TV broadcast of the game and called the ballpark's first home run, hit by the Braves' Chipper Jones in the 4th inning.
2009 Opening Day	George W. Bush (former President)^	Rangers Ballpark in Arlington	Bush had owned the Texas Rangers in the early 1990s.
2009 Opening Day	Joe Biden (Vice President)^{‡}	Oriole Park at Camden Yards	Future 46th president
2009 All-Star Game	Barack Obama	Busch Stadium	
2009 Japan Series	George W. Bush (former President)^	Tokyo Dome	Game 3 between the Hokkaido Nippon Ham Fighters and the Yomiuri Giants.
2010 Opening Day	Barack Obama	Nationals Park	100th anniversary of the first Presidential Opening Day ceremonial first pitch.
2010 World Series	George W. Bush (former President)^	Rangers Ballpark in Arlington	First World Series home game in franchise history; former President Bush – who owned the Rangers when the stadium was built – was accompanied to the mound by his father, George H. W. Bush, and Texas Rangers team president Nolan Ryan.
2011 College World Series	George W. Bush (former President)^	TD Ameritrade Park Omaha	This pitch marked the first game at the new home of the College World Series, replacing the nearby Johnny Rosenblatt Stadium. Before Bush threw out the first pitch, his father, who played for Yale in the first CWS in 1947, delivered a video message christening the new stadium. He is the first President to have thrown ceremonial first pitches for amateur and professional (both North America and Japanese) championship matches.
2011 World Series	George W. Bush (former President)^	Rangers Ballpark in Arlington	
2015 American League Division Series	George W. Bush (former President)^	Minute Maid Park	George H.W. Bush, aged 91, accompanied by his wife Barbara and in a wheelchair with a neck brace, threw the Houston Astros' first pitch at Game 3 of the ALDS against the Kansas City Royals.
2017 World Series	George W. Bush (former President)^	Minute Maid Park	Bush was accompanied and given the first pitch ball by his father, George H. W. Bush.
May 20, 2021 (NCAA regular season)	George W. Bush (former President)^	O'Brate Stadium	Bush was scheduled to throw the first pitch upon the opening of O'Brate Stadium in 2020 but the opening was delayed to 2021 due to the COVID-19 pandemic.
2023 World Series	George W. Bush (former President)^	Globe Life Field	Bush threw the first pitch to Iván Rodríguez.

== See also ==
- Ceremonial first puck, a similar ritual of ice hockey
