= 2020 Texas Longhorns baseball team =

American college baseball season

2020 Texas Longhorns baseball
- Conference: Big 12 Conference

Ranking
- Coaches: No. 22
- CB: No. 15
- Record: 14–3 (0–0 Big 12)
- Head coach: David Pierce (4th season)
- Assistant coaches: Sean Allen (4th season); Philip Miller (4th season)
- Home stadium: UFCU Disch–Falk Field

2020 Big 12 Conference baseball standings
	Conf.				Overall
Team	W		L	PCT	W		L	PCT
No. 3 Texas Tech ‍‍‍	0	–	0	–	16	–	3	.842
No. 22 Texas ‍‍‍	0	–	0	–	14	–	3	.824
No. 13 Oklahoma ‍‍‍	0	–	0	–	14	–	4	.778
TCU ‍‍‍	0	–	0	–	11	–	4	.733
Oklahoma State ‍‍‍	0	–	0	–	13	–	5	.722
West Virginia ‍‍‍	0	–	0	–	11	–	5	.688
Baylor ‍‍‍	0	–	0	–	10	–	6	.625
Kansas State ‍‍‍	0	–	0	–	10	–	7	.588
Kansas ‍‍‍	0	–	0	–	7	–	10	.412
‡ – Tournament champion As of March 15, 2020; Rankings from D1baseball

The 2020 Texas Longhorns baseball team represented the University of Texas at Austin during the 2020 NCAA Division I baseball season. The Longhorns played their home games at UFCU Disch–Falk Field as a member of the Big 12 Conference. They were led by head coach David Pierce, in his fourth season at Texas.

Due to the COVID-19 pandemic, the remainder of the season was canceled after March 13

== Personnel ==
=== Roster ===
2020 Texas Longhorns roster
Pitchers: 8 – Kamron Fields – Junior; 10 – Will Swope – Freshman; 13 – Bryce Elder – Junior; 17 – Austin Duplantier II – Freshman; 19 – Donny Diaz – (redshirt) Senior; 24 – Chase Lummus – Freshman; 32 – Ty Madden – Sophomore; 33 – Pete Hansen – Freshman; 34 – Cole Quintanilla – (redshirt) Sophomore; 35 – Tristan Stevens – (redshirt) Junior; 39 – Kolby Kubichek – Sophomore; 40 – Austin Wallace – Freshman; 42 – Dawson Merryman – Sophomore; 45 – Coy Cobb – Sophomore; 47 – Sam Walbridge – Freshman; 49 – Jared Southard – Freshman; 51 – Owen Meaney – Sophomore; 53 – Jackson Braun – Freshman; 56 – Justin Exkhardt – (redshirt) Freshman; 57 – Thomas Burbank – (redshirt) Freshman; 58 – Mason Bryant – Sophomore	Catchers: 4 – Silas Ardoin – Freshman; 6 – DJ Petrinsky – (redshirt) Senior; 15 – Peyton Powell – Freshman; 29 – Cam Constantine – Freshman; 48 – Caston Peter – Sophomore; Infielders: 0 – Trey Faltine – Freshman; 1 – Brenden Dixon – Freshman; 14 – Murphy Stehly – Junior; 28 – Lance Ford – Sophomore; 31 – Sam Bertelson – Junior; 43 – Peter Geib – Sophomore; 52 – Zach Zubia – (redshirt) Junior; 55 – Cam Williams – (redshirt) Junior	Outfielders: 7 – Douglas Hodo III – Freshman; 11 – Duke Ellis – Senior; 30 – Eric Kennedy – Sophomore; 44 – Austin Todd – Senior

=== Coaches ===
2020 Texas Longhorns coaching staff
- David Pierce – Head coach – 4th year
- Sean Allen – Assistant coach – 4th year
- Philip Miller – Assistant coach – 4th year
- Troy Tulowitzki – Volunteer assistant coach – 1st year
- Huston Street – Student assistant – 1st year

== Schedule and results ==
Legend
	Texas win
	Texas loss
	Postponement
**Bold**	Texas team member

2020 Texas Longhorns baseball game log
Regular Season
February

Date	Opponent	Rank	Site/Stadium	Score	Win	Loss	Save	Attendance	Overall Record	Big 12 Record
Feb 14	at Rice*	#22	Reckling Park • Houston, TX	**W** 7–4	**Elder (1–0)**	DeLeon (0–1)	**Diaz (1)**	3,044	1–0	–
Feb 15	at Rice*	#22	Reckling Park • Houston, TX	**W** 4–0	**Madden (1–0)**	Brogdon (0–1)		4,001	2–0	–
Feb 16	at Rice*	#22	Reckling Park • Houston, TX	**W** 5–4	**Stevens (1–0)**	Bordwine (0–1)	**Diaz (2)**	3,485	3–0	–
Feb 18	UTSA*	#22	UFCU Disch–Falk Field • Austin, TX	**W** 6–2	**Stevens (2–0)**	McKay (0–1)	**Hansen (1)**	4,424	4–0	–
Feb 19	Lamar*	#22	UFCU Disch–Falk Field • Austin, TX	**W** 6–1	**Kubichek (1–0)**	Hranicky (0–1)		3,999	5–0	–
Feb 21	Boise State*	#22	UFCU Disch–Falk Field • Austin, TX	**W** 7–0	**Elder (2–0)**	Weston (0–1)		4,876	6–0	–
Feb 22	Boise State*	#22	UFCU Disch–Falk Field • Austin, TX	**W** 2–1	**Madden (2–0)**	Omlid (0–1)		5,739	7–0	–
Feb 23	Boise State*	#22	UFCU Disch–Falk Field • Austin, TX	**W** 7–5 ^{10}	**Merryman (1–0)**	Flesland (0–1)		5,124	8–0	–
Feb 25	Sam Houston State*	#16	UFCU Disch–Falk Field • Austin, TX	**W** 4–1	**Hansen (1–0)**	Rogers (0–1)	**Duplantier II (1)**	4,750	9–0	–
Feb 28	vs. #19 LSU*	#16	Minute Maid Park • Houston, TX (Shriners College Classic)	L 3–4	Henry (2–1)	**Elder (2–1)**	Hill (1)	15,735	9–1	–
Feb 29	vs. #3 Arkansas*	#16	Minute Maid Park • Houston, TX (Shriners College Classic)	**W** 8–7	**Madden (3–0)**	Wicklander (2–1)	**Duplantier II (2)**	15,972	10–1	–

March

Date	Opponent	Rank	Site/Stadium	Score	Win	Loss	Save	Attendance	Overall Record	Big 12 Record
Mar 1	vs. Missouri*	#16	Minute Maid Park • Houston, TX (Shriners College Classic)	L 8–9	Willhelm (1–0)	**Kubichek (1–1)**	Dillard (2)	11,528	10–2	–
Mar 3	Arizona*	#19	UFCU Disch–Falk Field • Austin, TX	L 6–8	Vannelle (1–0)	**Meaney (0–1)**		4,552	10–3	–
Mar 6	Cal State Fullerton*	#19	UFCU Disch–Falk Field • Austin, TX	**W** 6–1	**Merryman (2–0)**	Bibee (1–3		5,611	11–3	–
Mar 7	Cal State Fullerton*	#19	UFCU Disch–Falk Field • Austin, TX	**W** 4–3	**Hansen (2–0)**	Groeneweg (0–1)	**Duplantier II (3)**	5,806	12–3	–
Mar 8	Cal State Fullerton*	#19	UFCU Disch–Falk Field • Austin, TX	**W** 8–4	**Merryman (3–0)**	Magrisi (0–3)		5,957	13–3	–
Mar 11	Abilene Christian*	#17	UFCU Disch–Falk Field • Austin, TX	**W** 9–1	**Kubichek (2–1)**	Krawietz (0–1)		5,068	14–3	–
Mar 13	New Mexico*	#17	UFCU Disch–Falk Field • Austin, TX	Games cancelled due to the COVID-19 pandemic						
Mar 14	New Mexico*	#17	UFCU Disch–Falk Field • Austin, TX							
Mar 15	New Mexico*	#17	UFCU Disch–Falk Field • Austin, TX							
Mar 17	Incarnate Word*		UFCU Disch–Falk Field • Austin, TX							
Mar 18	UT Arlington*		Dr Pepper Ballpark • Frisco, TX							
Mar 20	at Oklahoma		L. Dale Mitchell Baseball Park • Norman, OK							
Mar 21	at Oklahoma		L. Dale Mitchell Baseball Park • Norman, OK							
Mar 22	at Oklahoma		L. Dale Mitchell Baseball Park • Norman, OK							
Mar 24	at Texas State*		Bobcat Ballpark • San Marcos, TX							
Mar 27	Oklahoma State		UFCU Disch–Falk Field • Austin, TX							
Mar 28	Oklahoma State		UFCU Disch–Falk Field • Austin, TX							
Mar 29	Oklahoma State		UFCU Disch–Falk Field • Austin, TX							
Mar 31	at Texas A&M*		Olsen Field at Blue Bell Park • College Station, TX							

April

Date	Opponent	Rank	Site/Stadium	Score	Win	Loss	Save	Attendance	Overall Record	Big 12 Record
Apr 3	at West Virginia		Monongalia County Ballpark • Granville, WV							
Apr 4	at West Virginia		Monongalia County Ballpark • Granville, WV							
Apr 5	at West Virginia		Monongalia County Ballpark • Granville, WV							
Apr 7	at Houston*		Schroeder Park • Houston, TX							
Apr 9	Baylor		UFCU Disch–Falk Field • Austin, TX							
Apr 10	Baylor		UFCU Disch–Falk Field • Austin, TX							
Apr 11	Baylor		UFCU Disch–Falk Field • Austin, TX							
Apr 13	at Texas A&M–Corpus Christi*		Whataburger Field • Corpus Christi, TX							
Apr 14	Texas A&M–Corpus Christi*		UFCU Disch–Falk Field • Austin, TX							
Apr 17	Kansas		UFCU Disch–Falk Field • Austin, TX							
Apr 18	Kansas		UFCU Disch–Falk Field • Austin, TX							
Apr 19	Kansas		UFCU Disch–Falk Field • Austin, TX							
Apr 21	Texas State*		UFCU Disch–Falk Field • Austin, TX							
Apr 24	at Kansas State		Tointon Family Stadium • Manhattan, KS							
Apr 25	at Kansas State		Tointon Family Stadium • Manhattan, KS							
Apr 26	at Kansas State		Tointon Family Stadium • Manhattan, KS							
Apr 28	UTRGV*		UFCU Disch–Falk Field • Austin, TX							

May

Date	Opponent	Rank	Site/Stadium	Score	Win	Loss	Save	Attendance	Overall Record	Big 12 Record
May 1	at Texas Tech		Dan Law Field at Rip Griffin Park • Lubbock, TX							
May 2	at Texas Tech		Dan Law Field at Rip Griffin Park • Lubbock, TX							
May 3	at Texas Tech		Dan Law Field at Rip Griffin Park • Lubbock, TX							
May 6	Texas Southern*		UFCU Disch–Falk Field • Austin, TX							
May 8	TCU		UFCU Disch–Falk Field • Austin, TX							
May 9	TCU		UFCU Disch–Falk Field • Austin, TX							
May 10	TCU		UFCU Disch–Falk Field • Austin, TX							
May 12	McNeese State*		UFCU Disch–Falk Field • Austin, TX							

All rankings from Collegiate Baseball.

== Rankings ==
Ranking movements Legend: ██ Increase in ranking ██ Decrease in ranking — = Not ranked т = Tied with team above or below
	Week																		
Poll	Pre	1	2	3	4	5	6	7	8	9	10	11	12	13	14	15	16	17	Final
Coaches'	—	—*		22 т	22	22													
Baseball America	—	—	—	—	—														
Collegiate Baseball^	22	22	16	19	17	15													
NCBWA†	30	30	27	28	30	29													
D1Baseball	—	—	—	—	—														

^ Collegiate Baseball ranked 40 teams in their preseason poll, but only ranked 30 teams weekly during the season.
† NCBWA ranks 30 teams in their preseason poll, but only ranks 25 teams weekly during the season.
* A new poll was not released for this week, so for comparison purposes, the previous week's ranking is inserted in this week's slot.
