= Eitan Levine =

American comedian and internet personality

Eitan Levine (born 1989) is an American comedian and internet personality. His comedy often focuses on Jewish culture and news. He rose to prominence with his man on the street-style series, "Jewish or antisemitic?", in which he interviewed New Yorkers about whether random topics "felt" Jewish or antisemitic. He hosts the regular live gameshow, That's So Jewish! as well as the podcast Champagne Shiva. His work has been featured on Late Night with Stephen Colbert, Jimmy Kimmel Live!, and The Daily Show.

On August 21, 2024, he broke the Guinness world record for most first pitches thrown in a season. It was his 40th pitch in a nationwide effort raising money for the Make-A-Wish Foundation.

== Early life ==
Levine was born and raised in New York City. He is the grandson of Holocaust survivors. Levine was raised Modern Orthodox and attended an all-boys Jewish day school, where he struggled due to a learning disability. As a young adult, he drifted from Judaism because it had become associated for him with negativity and strict rules. Doing comedy that presented a lighthearted version of Judaism allowed him to reconnect with the faith on his own terms.

At age 10, Levine was diagnosed with Ewing sarcoma. He requested that the Make-A-Wish Foundation put him onstage for a comedy show. At age 15, he opened for Daryl Hammond at Caroline's as a fulfillment of this wish. Levine underwent two years of chemotherapy and many reconstructive surgeries over more than a decade. He is cancer free. Levine has often donated proceeds from his shows to the Foundation.

He majored in marketing at Yeshiva University. He is a longtime fan of the New York Mets.

== Career ==
Levine started doing standup with he was 15, at a gig arranged for him by the Make-A-Wish Foundation. He describes his early work as very "safe," and he performed primarily at JCCs and Hillel houses.

He took two years off stand-up comedy to write for Elite Daily, before returning to the open mic circuit in 2017. Before the pandemic, he interned for the Upright Citizen's Brigade.

Frustrated with the lack of opportunities for entry-level comedians, Levine organized a comedy festival to take place in his Brooklyn apartment in 2019. He fielded submissions from local comedians and selected those he thought were funniest, with no minimum requirements for experience or followers, which are often barriers to new comedians. He hosted Apartment Fest again in 2023, this time receiving more than 150 submissions. The festival lasted four days, and proceeds went to Make-A-Wish.

In 2020, Levine was scheduled to go on a comedy tour with Yeganeh Mafaher, who he met through Apartment Fest 2019. In recognition of their Jewish and Muslim backgrounds, the tour was named Shalom Habibi, and aimed to find common ground between the two groups. Each set was planned to feature comedians from each background, followed by a Q&A that would be released as a podcast. The tour, which was set to feature Josh Gondelman and Negin Farsad, was postponed and then cancelled due to COVID-19. Levine later said that the opportunity would have been his first time making a full salary from standup.

During lockdown, he hosted a drive-in comedy show, where audiences would mark outside the venue and listen via AM radio from their cars. He also co-hosted a recurring pop-up comedy show titled NYC is Dead!

Starting in 2022, Levine hosted Game Breakers on Prime Video's live sports service.

In 2022, Levine began filming a man-on-the-street series called "Jewish or Antisemitic?" The short-form video series quickly gained popular on social media, growing Levine's platform significantly. He later spun off the series into a live game show, That's So Jewish!, a Jeopardy!-style show where contestants compete for the title of "Most Chosen Person."

In 2024, he set a goal to break the world record for the most ceremonial first pitches thrown in a baseball season. His 40th pitch, at a Mets-Orioles game in Citi Field, broke the record. As of August 21, 2024, he had 11 more first pitches scheduled before the season's end.

He has written freelance pieces for a number of outlets, including the New York Times, The Cut, and PAPER Magazine.
