= Darin Thomas =

American college baseball coach and former pitcher

Biographical details
- Born: Tyrone, Oklahoma

Playing career
- 1986: Seward County CC
- 1987–1989: Oklahoma Christian
- Position: Pitcher

Coaching career (HC unless noted)
- 1990–1991: Edmond (OK) Oklahoma Christian (asst.)
- 1992–2000: Seward County CC (asst.)
- 2001–2007: UT Arlington (asst.)
- 2008–2022: UT Arlington

Head coaching record
- Overall: 404–414
- Tournaments: Southland: 7–6; WAC: 1–2; Sun Belt: 9–11; NCAA: 0–2

Accomplishments and honors

Championships
- Southland Tournament (2012); WAC Regular season (2013)

Awards
- Sun Belt Coach of the Year (2017)

Darin R. Thomas is an American college baseball coach and former pitcher. He served as the head coach of the Texas–Arlington Mavericks (2008–2022).

== Playing career ==
Thomas attended Seward County Community College in Liberal, Kansas. Thomas then accepted a scholarship to play at Oklahoma Christian College (OCC), to play college baseball for the OCC Eagles baseball team. While with the Eagles, Thomas was a 3 time First Team All-Sooner Athletic Conference selection.

== Coaching career ==
Thomas immediately began his coaching career upon the completion of his college degree at Oklahoma Christian School. After two years at Oklahoma Christian School, he returned to Seward County as an assistant coach. Thomas spent 9 seasons as an assistant at Seward before being named an assistant at Texas–Arlington.

Thomas was promoted to head coach in the fall of 2007. Following a 26–31 first season as head coach, UT Arlington signed Thomas to a 3-year contract extension. On May 23, 2022, Thomas resigned as the head coach of the Mavericks.

== Head coaching record ==
Statistics overview
Season	Team	Overall	Conference	Standing	Postseason
Texas–Arlington Mavericks (Southland Conference) (2008–2012)
2008	Texas–Arlington	26–31	16–14	4th (Western)	Southland tournament
2009	Texas–Arlington	30–26	19–13	5th	Southland tournament
2010	Texas–Arlington	29–31	19–14	5th	Southland tournament
2011	Texas–Arlington	27–29	19–14	T-8th	
2012	Texas–Arlington	36–25	19–14	T-3rd	NCAA Regional
Texas–Arlington:			92–69		
Texas–Arlington Mavericks (Western Athletic Conference) (2013)
2013	Texas–Arlington	31–27	18–9	T-1st	WAC tournament
Texas–Arlington:			18–9		
Texas–Arlington Mavericks (Sun Belt Conference) (2014–2022)
2014	Texas–Arlington	33–26	19–11	2nd	Sun Belt tournament
2015	Texas–Arlington	24–32	14–16	T-6th	Sun Belt tournament
2016	Texas–Arlington	30–28	15–15	7th	Sun Belt tournament
2017	Texas–Arlington	30–25	20–10	1st (West)	Sun Belt tournament
2018	Texas–Arlington	22–35	11–19	T-4th (West)	Sun Belt tournament
2019	Texas–Arlington	32–26	17–12	3rd (West)	Sun Belt tournament
2020	Texas–Arlington	12–4	0–0	(West)	Season canceled due to COVID-19
2021	Texas–Arlington	27–30	13–11	T-1st (West)	Sun Belt tournament
2022	Texas–Arlington	15–39	7–23	11th	
Texas–Arlington:		404–414	116–117		
Total:		404–414			
National champion Postseason invitational champion Conference regular season champion Conference regular season and conference tournament champion Division regular season champion Division regular season and conference tournament champion Conference tournament champion
