= Baylor Ballpark =

Baseball stadium in Waco, Texas, US

Coordinates: 31°33′3″N 97°6′28″W

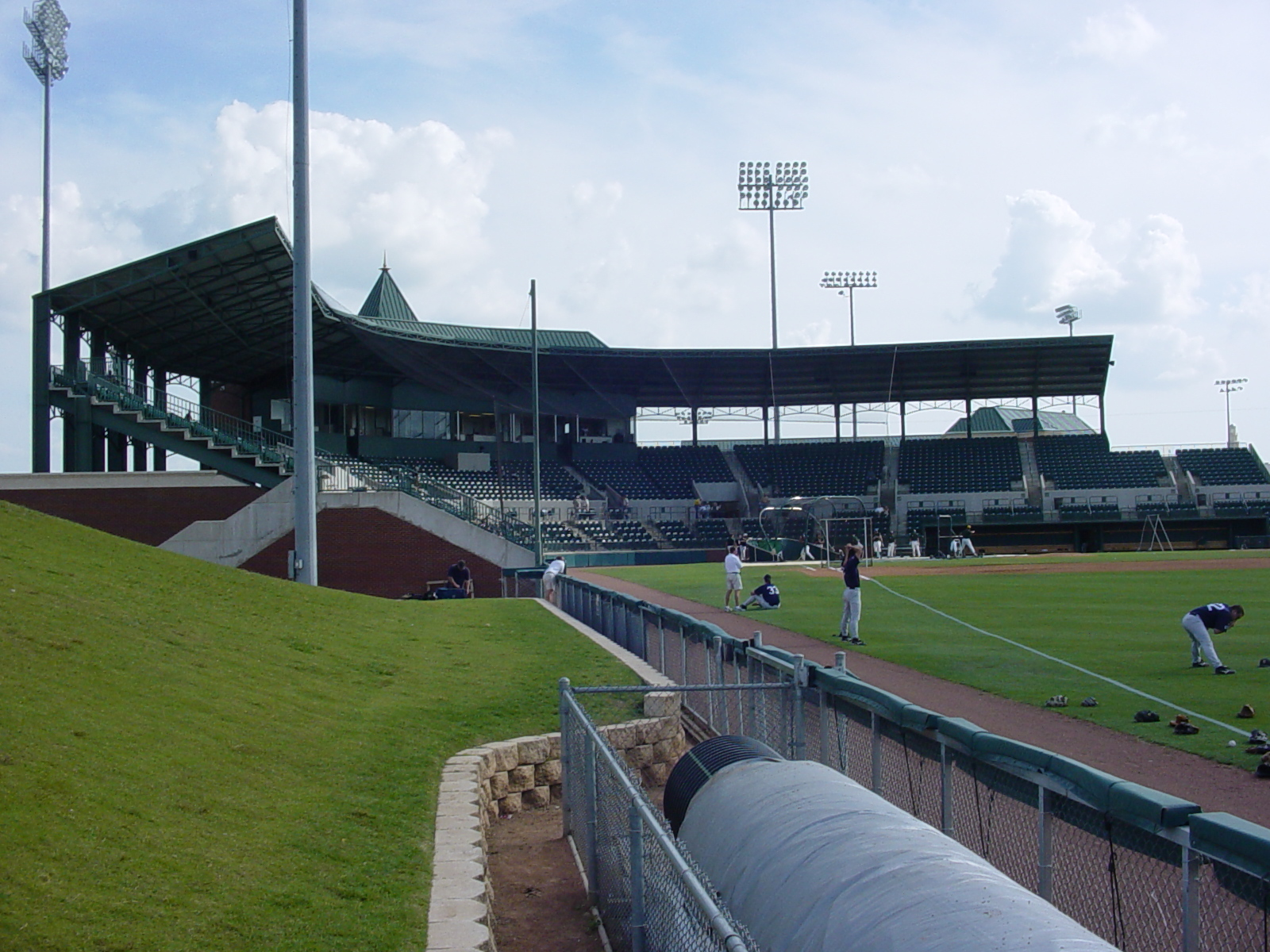
- Interactive map of Baylor Ballpark
- Location: Waco, Texas
- Owner: Baylor University
- Operator: Baylor University
- Capacity: 5,000
- Surface: Bermuda grass
- Field size: Left field - 330 ft Center field - 400 ft Right field - 330 ft

Construction
- Groundbreaking: 1998
- Opened: 1999
- Architect: Cooke Douglass Farr Lemons

Tenant
- Baylor Bears baseball (NCAA DI Big 12) (1999–present)

Baylor Ballpark is the baseball stadium at Baylor University in Waco, Texas. The stadium was built on the site of Ferrell Field, Baylor's home from 1977 to 1998, by mid-February in 1999. The Bears have hosted three NCAA regional and two super regional tournaments at Baylor Ballpark, including one of each in their College World Series season of 2005.

== Attendance ==
Baylor drew 100,000 fans in a season for the first time in 2005 en route to the College World Series. The Bears ranked in the nation's top 20 in attendance in the first nine full seasons they played at Baylor Ballpark. The stadium was voted as the third best collegiate baseball stadium in a 2003 poll conducted by Baseball America.

In 2019, the Bears ranked 33rd among Division I baseball programs in attendance, averaging 1,981 per home game.

Year	Total	Average
1999*	63,147	1,914
2000	87,127	2,811
2001	92,672	2,808
2002	89,343	2,882
2003	85,620	3,058
2004	90,693	2,748
2005	109,621	3,045
2006	96,427	3,013
2007	101,791	3,181
2008	95,027	3,065
2009	90,261	2,912
2010	89,804	2,641
2011	80,672	2,689
2012	126,947	3,255
2013	77,572	2,873
2014	74,648	2,575
2015	65,631	2,344
2016	74,735	2,335
2017	71,008	2,291
2018	56,754	2,183
2019	61,414	1,981
Total	1,710,984	2,695

* - 1999 total reflects only games at Baylor Ballpark and does not include the 4 home games played at McLennan CC in Waco. Baylor played its 1999 home schedule at Baylor Ballpark despite ongoing construction.

== Climate ==
Baylor Ballpark

Climate chart (precipitation, max. and min. temperature)
J	F	M	A	M	J	J	A	S	O	N	D
86 16 3	59 18 3	97 23 8	55 27 14	140 30 19	77 32 23	88 34 24	43 34 25	111 32 20	111 28 15	55 20 11	33 16 5
- █ Average max. and min. temperatures in °C
- █ Precipitation totals in mm
Imperial conversion
J	F	M	A	M	J	J	A	S	O	N	D
3.4 61 37	2.3 64 37	3.8 73 46	2.2 81 57	5.5 86 66	3 90 73	3.5 93 75	1.7 93 77	4.4 90 68	4.4 82 59	2.2 68 52	1.3 61 41
- █ Average max. and min. temperatures in °F
- █ Precipitation totals in inches

== See also ==
- List of NCAA Division I baseball venues
