= O'Brate Stadium =

Baseball park in Stillwater, Oklahoma, US

- Location within Oklahoma Location within the United States
- Interactive map of O'Brate Stadium
- Address: 103 N Bellis St. Stillwater, Oklahoma 74075
- Coordinates: 36.130975°N 97.068777°W
- Owner: Oklahoma State University
- Operator: Oklahoma State University
- Capacity: 3,500 (expandable to 8,000)
- Surface: Grass
- Scoreboard: 28.8 x 67.2 Daktronics LED Video board
- Record attendance: 8,230
- Field size: Left field: 331 ft (101 m); Center field: 402 ft (123 m); Right field: 325 ft (99 m)

Construction
- Groundbreaking: March 2018
- Built: 2018–2020
- Opened: February 24, 2021
- Cost: $60 million

Tenant
- Oklahoma State (Big 12) 2021–present

Website
- okstate.com/sports/2020/1/29/o-brate-stadium.aspx?id=1484

O'Brate Stadium is a baseball park in Stillwater, Oklahoma. The home field of the Oklahoma State University Cowboys college baseball team, it is named after Cecil O'Brate. It was scheduled to host its first game on March 20, 2020, against TCU. Former President George W. Bush was scheduled to throw out the first pitch. On March 13, 2020, the baseball season ended when the Big 12 announced that all spring sports were canceled due to COVID-19 concerns, postponing the opening until February 24, 2021.
