= JRW =

JRW or Jrw could refer to:

- Jackie Robinson West Little League, an all-black youth baseball team from Chicago, Illinois, U.S.
- Jarosewichite, an arsenic-containing mineral found in Franklin, New Jersey, U.S.
- Jurong West MRT station, a future train station in the Jurong West neighborhood of Singapore
- West Japan Railway Company, or JR West
