= 2020 Major League Baseball draft =

Major League Baseball draft

General information
- Date: June 10–11, 2020
- Location: Secaucus, New Jersey; Omaha, Nebraska (original planned location)
- Networks: MLB Network; ESPN/ESPN2; ESPN Deportes

Overview
- 160 total selections in 5 rounds
- First selection: Spencer Torkelson; Detroit Tigers
- First round selections: 37

The 2020 Major League Baseball draft took place on June 10 and 11, 2020. The draft assigned amateur baseball players to Major League Baseball (MLB) teams. The draft order was set based on the reverse order of the 2019 MLB season standings. In addition, compensation picks were distributed for players who did not sign from the 2019 MLB draft and for teams who lost qualifying free agents. On March 26, 2020, MLB and the MLBPA reached a deal that included the option to shorten the draft to five rounds, and also shorten the 2021 draft to 20 rounds due to the COVID-19 pandemic. In a plan to allow teams to sign an unlimited number of undrafted players for $20,000 each, MLB ultimately opted to shorten the 2020 draft to five rounds. The draft was originally planned to be hosted live for the first time in Omaha, Nebraska, to accompany the later-cancelled 2020 College World Series. However, due to the COVID-19 pandemic, the draft was instead held remotely from MLB Network's studios in Secaucus, New Jersey. With sponsorship from T-Mobile, the event was officially the 2020 MLB Draft Presented by T-Mobile, with ESPN providing live coverage for the first time since 2008, alongside MLB Network.

The Detroit Tigers, who had the worst record of the 2019 MLB season, selected Spencer Torkelson with the first overall pick in the draft. As punishment for their role in the sign stealing scandal, the Houston Astros forfeited their first- and second-round picks in the draft. The Boston Red Sox also forfeited their second-round pick in the draft as punishment for their own sign-stealing violations. Among the selected players, there were 41 who had played for the United States national baseball team and 2 who had played for the Canada national baseball team.

On September 18, 2020, the Chicago White Sox promoted Garrett Crochet to the major leagues, becoming the first MLB player in six years to reach the big leagues in the same year in which he was drafted.

== Draft selections ==
Key
	All-Star
*	Player did not sign

=== First round ===
Pick	Player	Team	Position	School
1	Spencer Torkelson	Detroit Tigers	Third baseman	Arizona State
2	Heston Kjerstad	Baltimore Orioles	Outfielder	Arkansas
3	Max Meyer	Miami Marlins	Pitcher	Minnesota
4	Asa Lacy	Kansas City Royals	Pitcher	Texas A&M
5	Austin Martin	Toronto Blue Jays	Shortstop	Vanderbilt
6	Emerson Hancock	Seattle Mariners	Pitcher	Georgia
7	Nick Gonzales	Pittsburgh Pirates	Second baseman	New Mexico State
8	Robert Hassell	San Diego Padres	Outfielder	Independence High School (TN)
9	Zac Veen	Colorado Rockies	Outfielder	Spruce Creek High School (FL)
10	Reid Detmers	Los Angeles Angels	Pitcher	Louisville
11	Garrett Crochet	Chicago White Sox	Pitcher	Tennessee
12	Austin Hendrick	Cincinnati Reds	Outfielder	West Allegheny Senior High School (PA)
13	Patrick Bailey	San Francisco Giants	Catcher	NC State
14	Justin Foscue	Texas Rangers	Second baseman	Mississippi State
15	Mick Abel	Philadelphia Phillies	Pitcher	Jesuit High School (OR)
16	Ed Howard	Chicago Cubs	Shortstop	Mount Carmel High School (IL)
17	Nick Yorke	Boston Red Sox	Second baseman	Archbishop Mitty High School (CA)
18	Bryce Jarvis	Arizona Diamondbacks	Pitcher	Duke
19	Pete Crow-Armstrong	New York Mets	Outfielder	Harvard-Westlake School (CA)
20	Garrett Mitchell	Milwaukee Brewers	Outfielder	UCLA
21	Jordan Walker	St. Louis Cardinals	Third baseman	Decatur High School (GA)
22	Cade Cavalli	Washington Nationals	Pitcher	Oklahoma
23	Carson Tucker	Cleveland Indians	Shortstop	Mountain Pointe High School (AZ)
24	Nick Bitsko	Tampa Bay Rays	Pitcher	Central Bucks High School East (PA)
25	Jared Shuster	Atlanta Braves	Pitcher	Wake Forest
26	Tyler Soderstrom	Oakland Athletics	Catcher	Turlock High School (CA)
27	Aaron Sabato	Minnesota Twins	First baseman	North Carolina
28	Austin Wells	New York Yankees	Catcher	Arizona
29	Bobby Miller	Los Angeles Dodgers	Pitcher	Louisville

=== Competitive balance round A ===
Pick	Player	Team	Position	School
30	Jordan Westburg	Baltimore Orioles	Shortstop	Mississippi State
31	Carmen Mlodzinski	Pittsburgh Pirates	Pitcher	South Carolina
32	Nick Loftin	Kansas City Royals	Shortstop	Baylor
33	Slade Cecconi	Arizona Diamondbacks	Pitcher	Miami
34	Justin Lange	San Diego Padres	Pitcher	Llano High School (TX)
35	Drew Romo	Colorado Rockies	Catcher	The Woodlands High School (TX)
36	Tanner Burns	Cleveland Indians	Pitcher	Auburn
37	Alika Williams	Tampa Bay Rays (Note: Rays acquired José Martínez, Randy Arozarena, and the 37th pick from the St. Louis Cardinals for Matthew Liberatore, Edgardo Rodriguez, and the 63rd pick.)	Shortstop	Arizona State

=== Second round ===
Pick	Player	Team	Position	School
38	Dillon Dingler	Detroit Tigers	Catcher	Ohio State
39	Hudson Haskin	Baltimore Orioles	Outfielder	Tulane
40	Dax Fulton	Miami Marlins	Pitcher	Mustang High School (OK)
41	Ben Hernandez	Kansas City Royals	Pitcher	De La Salle Institute (IL)
42	CJ Van Eyk	Toronto Blue Jays	Pitcher	Florida State
43	Zach DeLoach	Seattle Mariners	Outfielder	Texas A&M
44	Jared Jones	Pittsburgh Pirates	Pitcher	La Mirada High School (CA)
45	Owen Caissie	San Diego Padres	Outfielder	Notre Dame Secondary School (ON)
46	Chris McMahon	Colorado Rockies	Pitcher	Miami
47	Jared Kelley	Chicago White Sox	Pitcher	Refugio High School (TX)
48	Christian Roa	Cincinnati Reds	Pitcher	Texas A&M
49	Casey Schmitt	San Francisco Giants	Third baseman	San Diego State
50	Evan Carter	Texas Rangers	Outfielder	Elizabethton High School (TN)
51	Burl Carraway	Chicago Cubs	Pitcher	Dallas Baptist
52	J. T. Ginn	New York Mets	Pitcher	Mississippi State
53	Freddy Zamora	Milwaukee Brewers	Shortstop	Miami
54	Masyn Winn	St. Louis Cardinals	Shortstop/Pitcher	Kingwood High School (TX)
55	Cole Henry	Washington Nationals	Pitcher	LSU
56	Logan Allen	Cleveland Indians	Pitcher	Florida International
57	Ian Seymour	Tampa Bay Rays	Pitcher	Virginia Tech
58	Jeff Criswell	Oakland Athletics	Pitcher	Michigan
59	Alerick Soularie	Minnesota Twins	Outfielder	Tennessee
60	Landon Knack	Los Angeles Dodgers	Pitcher	East Tennessee State

=== Competitive balance round B ===
Pick	Player	Team	Position	School
61	Kyle Nicolas	Miami Marlins	Pitcher	Ball State
62	Daniel Cabrera	Detroit Tigers	Outfielder	LSU
63	Tink Hence	St. Louis Cardinals	Pitcher	Watson Chapel High School (AR)
64	Connor Phillips	Seattle Mariners (Note: Mariners acquired Adam Hill and the 64th pick from the Milwaukee Brewers for Omar Narváez.)	Pitcher	McLennan Community College
65	Jackson Miller	Cincinnati Reds	Catcher	J. W. Mitchell High School (FL)
66	Clayton Beeter	Los Angeles Dodgers (Note: Dodgers acquired Brusdar Graterol, Luke Raley and the 66th pick from the Minnesota Twins for Kenta Maeda, Jaír Camargo, and cash.)	Pitcher	Texas Tech

=== Compensatory round ===
Pick	Player	Team	Position	School
67	Nick Swiney	San Francisco Giants (Note: Compensation pick for the Arizona Diamondbacks signing Madison Bumgarner)	Pitcher	NC State
68	Jimmy Glowenke	San Francisco Giants (Note: Compensation pick for the Atlanta Braves signing Will Smith)	Shortstop	Dallas Baptist
69	Isaiah Greene	New York Mets (Note: Compensation pick for the Philadelphia Phillies signing Zack Wheeler)	Outfielder	Corona High School (CA)
70	Alec Burleson	St. Louis Cardinals (Note: Compensation pick for the Atlanta Braves signing Marcell Ozuna)	Outfielder	East Carolina
71	Sammy Infante	Washington Nationals (Note: Compensation pick for the Los Angeles Angels signing Anthony Rendon)	Shortstop	Monsignor Edward Pace High School (FL)
72	Alex Santos	Houston Astros (Note: Compensation pick for the New York Yankees signing Gerrit Cole)	Pitcher	Mount Saint Michael Academy (NY)

=== Third round ===
Pick	Player	Team	Position	School
73	Trei Cruz	Detroit Tigers	Shortstop	Rice
74	Anthony Servideo	Baltimore Orioles	Shortstop	Ole Miss
75	Zach McCambley	Miami Marlins	Pitcher	Coastal Carolina
76	Tyler Gentry	Kansas City Royals	Outfielder	Alabama
77	Trent Palmer	Toronto Blue Jays	Pitcher	Jacksonville
78	Kaden Polcovich	Seattle Mariners	Second baseman	Oklahoma State
79	Nick Garcia	Pittsburgh Pirates	Pitcher	Chapman
80	Cole Wilcox	San Diego Padres	Pitcher	Georgia
81	Sam Weatherly	Colorado Rockies	Pitcher	Clemson
82	David Calabrese	Los Angeles Angels	Outfielder	St. Elizabeth Catholic High School (ON)
83	Adisyn Coffey	Chicago White Sox	Pitcher	Wabash Valley
84	Bryce Bonnin	Cincinnati Reds	Pitcher	Texas Tech
85	Kyle Harrison	San Francisco Giants	Pitcher	De La Salle High School (CA)
86	Tekoah Roby	Texas Rangers	Pitcher	Pine Forest High School (FL)
87	Casey Martin	Philadelphia Phillies	Shortstop	Arkansas
88	Jordan Nwogu	Chicago Cubs	Outfielder	Michigan
89	Blaze Jordan	Boston Red Sox	Third baseman	DeSoto Central High School (MS)
90	Liam Norris	Arizona Diamondbacks	Pitcher	Green Hope High School (NC)
91	Anthony Walters	New York Mets	Shortstop	San Diego State
92	Zavier Warren	Milwaukee Brewers	Catcher	Central Michigan
93	Levi Prater	St. Louis Cardinals	Pitcher	Oklahoma
94	Holden Powell	Washington Nationals	Pitcher	UCLA
95	Petey Halpin	Cleveland Indians	Outfielder	Mira Costa High School (CA)
96	Hunter Barnhart	Tampa Bay Rays	Pitcher	St. Joseph High School (CA)
97	Jesse Franklin V	Atlanta Braves	Outfielder	Michigan
98	Michael Guldberg	Oakland Athletics	Outfielder	Georgia Tech
99	Trevor Hauver	New York Yankees	Second baseman	Arizona State
100	Jake Vogel	Los Angeles Dodgers	Outfielder	Huntington Beach High School (CA)
101	Tyler Brown	Houston Astros	Pitcher	Vanderbilt

=== Fourth round ===
Pick	Player	Team	Position	School
102	Gage Workman	Detroit Tigers	Third baseman	Arizona State
103	Coby Mayo	Baltimore Orioles	Third baseman	Stoneman Douglas High School (FL)
104	Jake Eder	Miami Marlins	Pitcher	Vanderbilt
105	Christian Chamberlain	Kansas City Royals	Pitcher	Oregon State
106	Nick Frasso	Toronto Blue Jays	Pitcher	Loyola Marymount
107	Tyler Keenan	Seattle Mariners	Third baseman	Ole Miss
108	Jack Hartman	Pittsburgh Pirates	Pitcher	Appalachian State
109	Levi Thomas	San Diego Padres	Pitcher	Troy
110	Case Williams	Colorado Rockies	Pitcher	Douglas County High School (CO)
111	Werner Blakely	Los Angeles Angels	Shortstop	Detroit Edison High School (MI)
112	Kade Mechals	Chicago White Sox	Pitcher	Grand Canyon
113	Mac Wainwright	Cincinnati Reds	Outfielder	St. Edward High School (OH)
114	R. J. Dabovich	San Francisco Giants	Pitcher	Arizona State
115	Dylan MacLean	Texas Rangers	Pitcher	Central Catholic High School (OR)
116	Carson Ragsdale	Philadelphia Phillies	Pitcher	South Florida
117	Luke Little	Chicago Cubs	Pitcher	San Jacinto College North
118	Jeremy Wu-Yelland	Boston Red Sox	Pitcher	Hawaii
119	A. J. Vukovich	Arizona Diamondbacks	Third baseman	East Troy High School (WI)
120	Matthew Dyer	New York Mets	Catcher	Arizona
121	Joey Wiemer	Milwaukee Brewers	Outfielder	Cincinnati
122	Ian Bedell	St. Louis Cardinals	Pitcher	Missouri
123	Brady Lindsly	Washington Nationals	Catcher	Oklahoma
124	Milan Tolentino	Cleveland Indians	Shortstop	Santa Margarita High School (CA)
125	Tanner Murray	Tampa Bay Rays	Shortstop	UC Davis
126	Spencer Strider	Atlanta Braves	Pitcher	Clemson
127	Dane Acker	Oakland Athletics	Pitcher	Oklahoma
128	Marco Raya	Minnesota Twins	Pitcher	United South High School (TX)
129	Beck Way	New York Yankees	Pitcher	Northwest Florida State
130	Carson Taylor	Los Angeles Dodgers	Catcher	Virginia Tech
131	Zach Daniels	Houston Astros	Outfielder	Tennessee

=== Fifth round ===
Pick	Player	Team	Position	School
132	Colt Keith	Detroit Tigers	Third baseman	Biloxi High School (MS)
133	Carter Baumler	Baltimore Orioles	Pitcher	Dowling Catholic High School (IA)
134	Kyle Hurt	Miami Marlins	Pitcher	USC
135	Will Klein	Kansas City Royals	Pitcher	Eastern Illinois
136	Zach Britton	Toronto Blue Jays	Outfielder	Louisville
137	Taylor Dollard	Seattle Mariners	Pitcher	Cal Poly
138	Logan Hofmann	Pittsburgh Pirates	Pitcher	Northwestern State
139	Jagger Haynes	San Diego Padres	Pitcher	West Columbus High School (NC)
140	Jack Blomgren	Colorado Rockies	Shortstop	Michigan
141	Adam Seminaris	Los Angeles Angels	Pitcher	Long Beach State
142	Bailey Horn	Chicago White Sox	Pitcher	Auburn
143	Joe Boyle	Cincinnati Reds	Pitcher	Notre Dame
144	Ryan Murphy	San Francisco Giants	Pitcher	Le Moyne
145	Thomas Saggese	Texas Rangers	Shortstop	Carlsbad High School (CA)
146	Baron Radcliff	Philadelphia Phillies	Outfielder	Georgia Tech
147	Koen Moreno	Chicago Cubs	Pitcher	Panther Creek High School (NC)
148	Shane Drohan	Boston Red Sox	Pitcher	Florida State
149	Brandon Pfaadt	Arizona Diamondbacks	Pitcher	Bellarmine
150	Eric Orze	New York Mets	Pitcher	New Orleans
151	Hayden Cantrelle	Milwaukee Brewers	Shortstop	Louisiana
152	LJ Jones	St. Louis Cardinals	Outfielder	Long Beach State
153	Mitchell Parker	Washington Nationals	Pitcher	San Jacinto College North
154	Mason Hickman	Cleveland Indians	Pitcher	Vanderbilt
155	Jeff Hakanson	Tampa Bay Rays	Pitcher	Central Florida
156	Bryce Elder	Atlanta Braves	Pitcher	Texas
157	Stevie Emanuels	Oakland Athletics	Pitcher	Washington
158	Kala'i Rosario	Minnesota Twins	Outfielder	Waiakea High School (HI)
159	Gavin Stone	Los Angeles Dodgers	Pitcher	Central Arkansas
160	Shay Whitcomb	Houston Astros	Shortstop	UC San Diego

== Summary ==
=== Selections by school and conference or state/province ===
Conference/State	Round 1	CB Round A	Round 2	CB Round B	Comp Round	Round 3	Round 4	Round 5	Total
High school baseball states
Arkansas	0	0	0	1	0	0	0	0	1
Arizona	1	0	0	0	0	0	0	0	1
California	3	0	1	0	1	4	1	1	11
Colorado	0	0	0	0	0	0	1	0	1
Florida	1	0	0	1	1	1	1	0	5
Georgia	1	0	0	0	0	0	0	0	1
Hawaii	0	0	0	0	0	0	0	1	1
Illinois	1	0	1	0	0	0	0	0	2
Iowa	0	0	0	0	0	0	0	1	1
Michigan	0	0	0	0	0	0	1	0	1
Mississippi	0	0	0	0	0	1	0	1	2
New York	0	0	0	0	1	0	0	0	1
North Carolina	0	0	0	0	0	1	0	2	3
Ohio	0	0	0	0	0	0	1	0	1
Oklahoma	0	0	1	0	0	0	0	0	1
Ontario	0	0	1	0	0	1	0	0	2
Oregon	1	0	0	0	0	0	1	0	2
Pennsylvania	2	0	0	0	0	0	0	0	2
Tennessee	1	0	1	0	0	0	0	0	2
Texas	0	2	2	0	0	0	1	0	5
Wisconsin	0	0	0	0	0	0	1	0	1
NCAA Division I baseball conferences
American	0	0	1	0	1	0	2	1	5
ACC	6	1	4	0	1	2	2	4	16
ASUN	0	0	0	0	0	1	0	0	1
Big 12	1	1	0	1	0	3	2	1	9
Big Ten	1	0	2	0	0	2	0	1	6
Big West	0	0	0	0	0	0	2	3	5
C-USA	0	0	1	0	0	1	0	0	2
MAC	0	0	0	1	0	1	0	0	2
MW	0	0	1	0	0	0	0	0	1
OVC	0	0	0	0	0	0	0	1	1
Pac-12	3	1	0	0	0	2	4	2	12
SEC	6	3	5	1	0	5	4	2	26
SoCon	0	0	1	0	0	0	0	0	1
Southland	0	0	0	0	0	0	0	3	3
Sun Belt	0	0	0	0	0	1	2	1	4
WCC	0	0	0	0	0	0	1	0	1
WAC	1	0	1	0	1	1	1	0	5
NCAA Division II baseball conferences
CCAA	0	0	0	0	0	0	0	1	1
GLVC	0	0	0	0	0	0	0	1	1
NE10	0	0	0	0	0	0	0	1	1
NCAA Division III baseball conferences
SCIAC	0	0	0	0	0	1	0	0	1
NJCAA baseball conferences
GRAC	0	0	0	0	0	1	0	0	1
NTJCAC	0	0	0	1	0	0	0	0	1
Panhandle	0	0	0	0	0	0	1	0	1
SJCC	0	0	0	0	0	0	1	1	2

=== Selections by position ===
Position	Round 1	CB Round A	Round 2	CB Round B	Comp Round	Round 3	Round 4	Round 5	Total
Pitcher	11	4	15	4	2	14	17	20	87
Catcher	3	1	1	1	0	1	3	0	10
First base	1	0	0	0	0	0	0	0	1
Second base	2	0	0	0	0	2	0	0	4
Third base	2	0	1	0	0	1	4	1	9
Shortstop	4	3	2	0	2	4	3	4	22
Outfield	6	0	5	1	2	7	3	4	28

=== Schools with multiple draft selections ===
Selections	Colleges
5	Arizona State
4	Michigan, Oklahoma, Vanderbilt
3	Louisville, U. of Miami, Mississippi State, Tennessee, Texas A&M
2	Arizona, Arkansas, Auburn, Clemson, Dallas Baptist, Florida State, Georgia, Georgia Tech, Long Beach State, LSU, NC State, Ole Miss, San Diego State, San Jacinto College North, Texas Tech, UCLA, Virginia Tech

== Notes ==
Compensation picks

Trades
