= Refugio Independent School District =

School district in Texas, United States

Address
- 212 West Vance Street Refugio, Texas, 78377; United States

District information
- Grades: PK–12
- Schools: 3
- NCES District ID: 4836780

Students and staff
- Students: 685 (2023–2024)
- Teachers: 53.12 (on an FTE basis)
- Student–teacher ratio: 12.90:1

Other information
- Website: www.refugioisd.net

Refugio Independent School District is a public school district based in Refugio, Texas (USA).

Located in Refugio County, a small portion of the district extends into Bee and Victoria counties.

In 2009, the school district was rated "academically acceptable" by the Texas Education Agency.

== History ==
On July 1, 1994, the McFaddin Independent School District consolidated into the Refugio district.

== Schools ==
- Refugio High School (Grades 7-12)
- Stricklin Elementary School (Grades K-6)

== Athletics ==
On December 16, 2011 the Refugio Bobcats were victorious in the State Title game against the Cisco Loboes. With a score of 36-35, the Bobcats claimed their third Championship in school history, and the first since 1982. It was Coach Jason Herring's second championship, as he coached the Sonora Broncos to a title in 2000.

== Notable alumni ==
- Dan Firova, Major League Baseball player
- Jared Kelley, Major League Baseball player
- Toya Jones, Track and Field NFL Football player

== Controversy ==
In 2011, ESPN's Outside the Lines program highlighted Jason Herring and the Refugio High School football team's preparation for the state playoffs, where they routinely could not avoid running up the score. Having missed the state championship game in three consecutive years, Coach Herring decided to better prepare his team for the postseason, resulting in a heated controversy that even led to death threats to the coach.
