= McFaddin Independent School District =

Defunct school district in Texas, USA

McFaddin Independent School District (MISD) was a public school district based in Victoria County, Texas. It consolidated into the Refugio Independent School District in 1994.

== History ==
MISD served a population-small ranching community in Victoria County.

Its original school was built in 1905, as a wooden schoolhouse consisting of four rooms.

In 1983, a new brick school house was built. Enrollment at the McFaddin School at the time was 12 K-8 students, with 9-12 students attending a high school outside of the district. Students at the schoolhouse received a considerable amount of attention due to the low student to teacher ratio. It ran two buses, one to gather students and the other to transport the high school students.

In the fall of 1993, the school district faced a precarious situation as it could not raise sufficient funds, indicating a shutdown that year or the next without action. In order for the district to remain open, it would have to raise the property wealth tax rate 386%, to $1.50 per $100 of property. However, only one third of the money would go towards educating students due to the Robin Hood plan, which would ensure more equal funding throughout the state. The scheme meant some small districts were in similar situations as property wealth per pupil would have to even out statewide, meaning districts with an abundant tax base but low enrollment like McFaddin would have to surrender excess wealth. The district were left with the option of consolidation, sharing the tax base with poorer districts, or sending excess funds to the state. Voters opted to send excess funds raised to the state that month.

In June 1994, trustees of Refugio and McFaddin ISD met at Refugio High School in order to consider consolidation. It officially took place July 1, 1994.
