= Texas League Pitcher of the Year Award =

- Sport: Baseball
- League: Texas League
- Awarded for: Best regular-season pitcher in the Texas League
- Country: United States
- Presented by: Texas League

History
- First award: George Darrow (1933)
- Most recent: Kade Anderson (2026)

The Texas League Pitcher of the Year Award is an annual award given to the best pitcher in Minor League Baseball's Texas League based on their regular-season performance as voted on by league managers. League broadcasters, Minor League Baseball executives, and members of the media have previously voted as well. Though the league was established in 1888, the award was not created until 1933. The Texas League suspended operations during World War II from 1943 to 1945. After the cancellation of the 2020 season, the league was known as the Double-A Central in 2021 before reverting to the Texas League name in 2022.

Eleven players from the San Antonio Missions have been selected for the Pitcher of the Year Award, more than any other team in the league, followed by the Arkansas Travelers (9); the Dallas Rangers (7); the Shreveport Captains (6); the Tulsa Drillers (5); the Corpus Christi Hooks, El Paso Diablos, and Jackson Mets (4); the Albuquerque Dodgers, Frisco RoughRiders, and Ozarks Springbirds (3); the Amarillo Giants, Austin Braves, Round Rock Express, and Tulsa Oilers (2); and the Alexandria Aces, Beaumont Exporters, Dallas–Fort Worth Spurs, Fort Worth Cats, Galveston Buccaneers, Houston Buffaloes, Midland RockHounds, Shreveport Sports, Victoria Rosebuds, and Wichita Wranglers (1).

Ten players from the San Francisco Giants Major League Baseball (MLB) organization have won the award, more than any other, followed by the Los Angeles Dodgers and St. Louis Cardinalsorganizations (9); the Houston Astros organization (8); the New York Mets, San Diego Padres, Seattle Mariners, and Texas Rangers organizations (4); the Baltimore Orioles, Colorado Rockies, Los Angeles Angels, and Milwaukee Brewers organizations (3); the Atlanta Braves and Cleveland Guardians organizations (2); and the Chicago Cubs, Cincinnati Reds, Detroit Tigers, and Oakland Athletics organizations (1). Five award winners played for teams that were not affiliated with any MLB organization.

== Winners ==
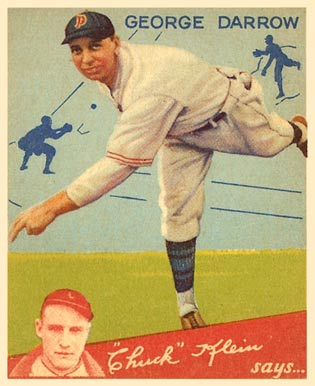
George Darrow won the first Pitcher of the Year Award in 1933.

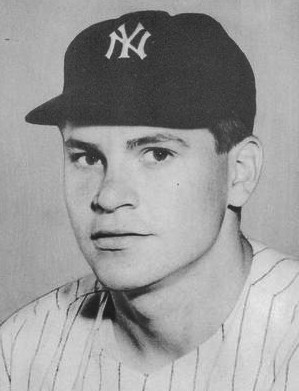
Bob Turley, the 1951 winner, won the Cy Young Award in 1958.

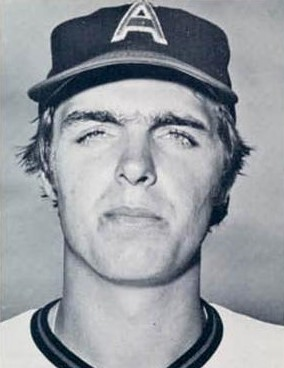
Frank Tanana, the 1973 winner, was selected to play in three MLB All-Star Games (1976–1978).

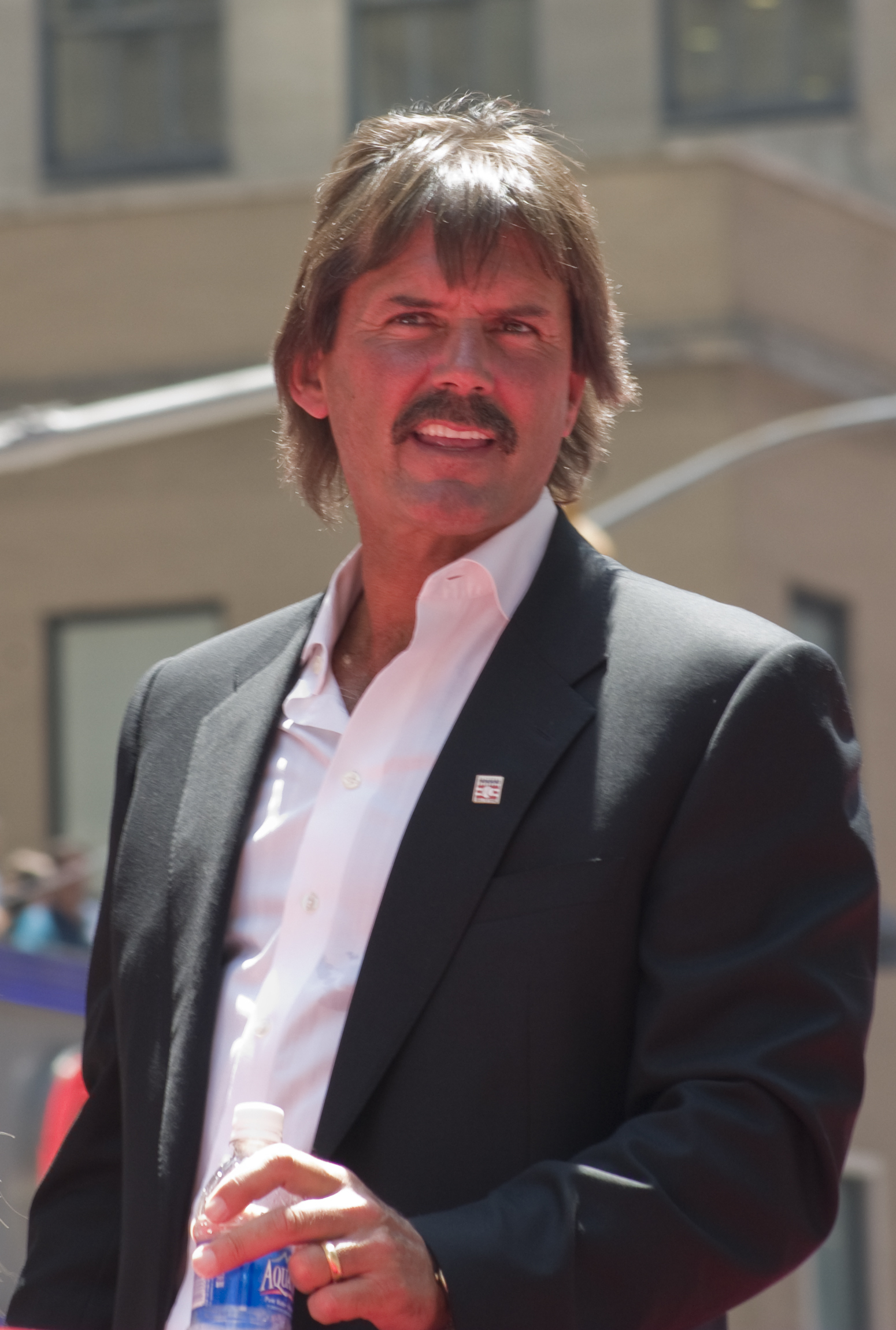
Dennis Eckersley, the 1974 recipient, won the 1992 Amiercan League Cy Young Award and AL Most Valuable Player Award and was inducted into the Baseball Hall of Fame in 2004.

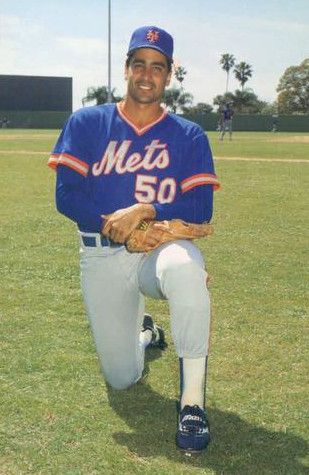
Sid Fernandez, the winner in 1983, was selected for two MLB All-Star Games (1986 and 1987).

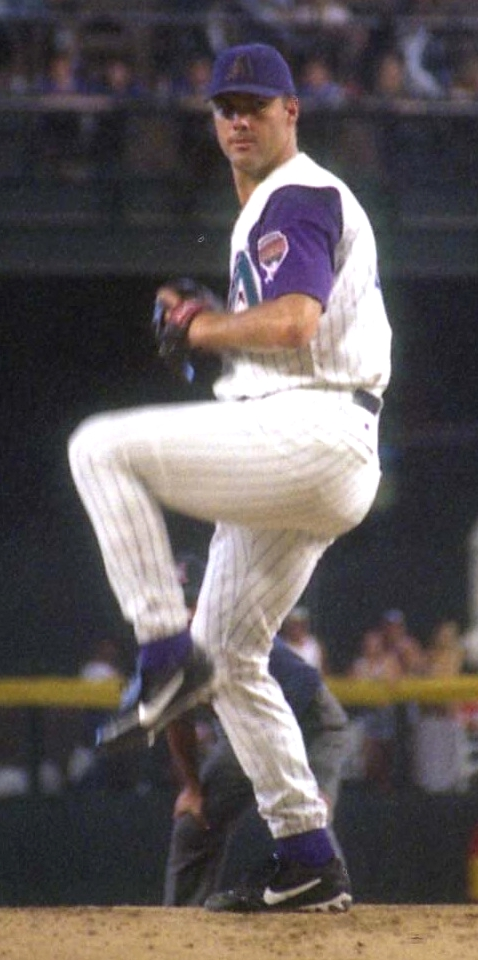
Andy Benes, the winner in 1989, was selected to play in the 1993 MLB All-Star Game.

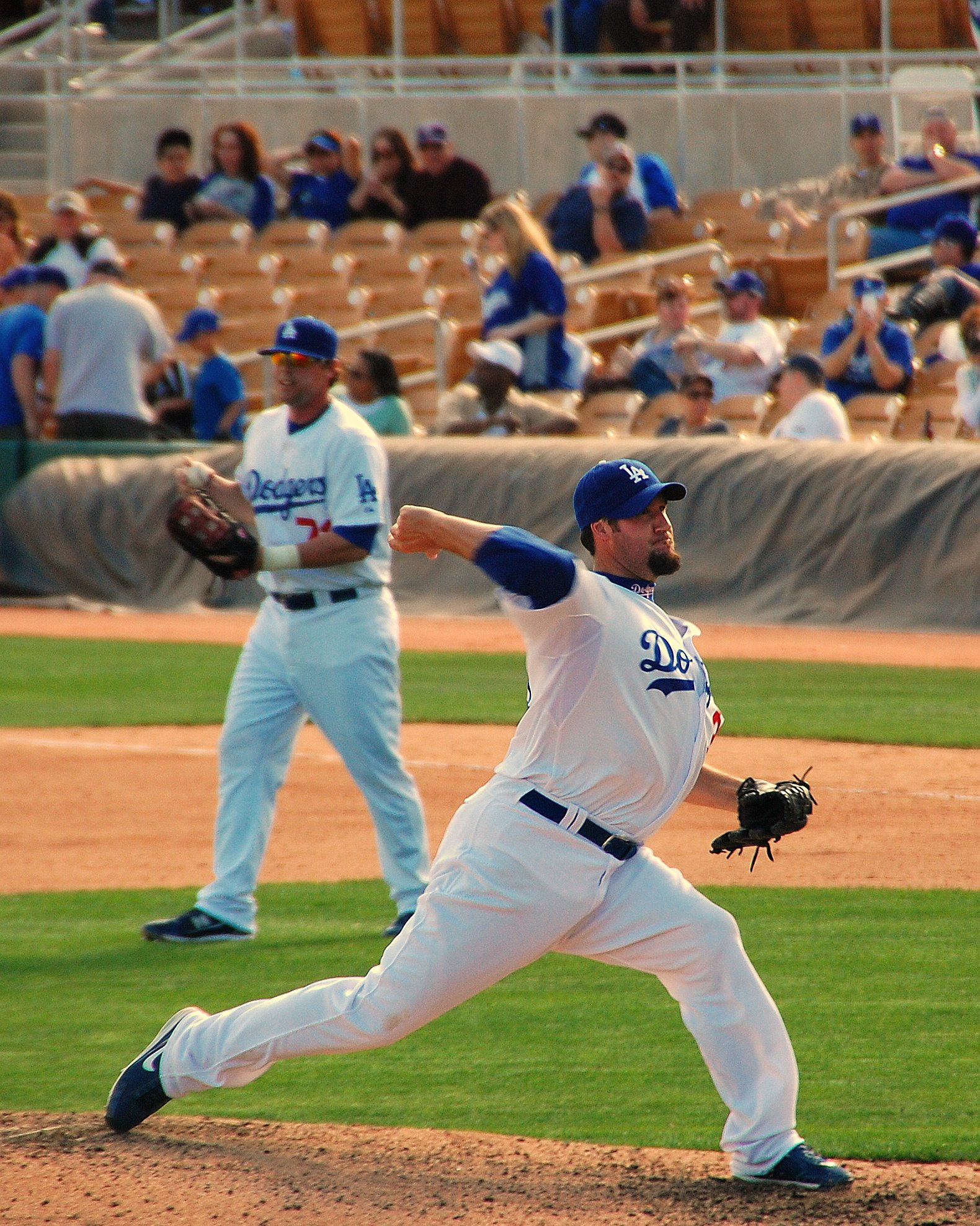
Éric Gagné, the 1999 winner, won the 2003 National League Cy Young Award.

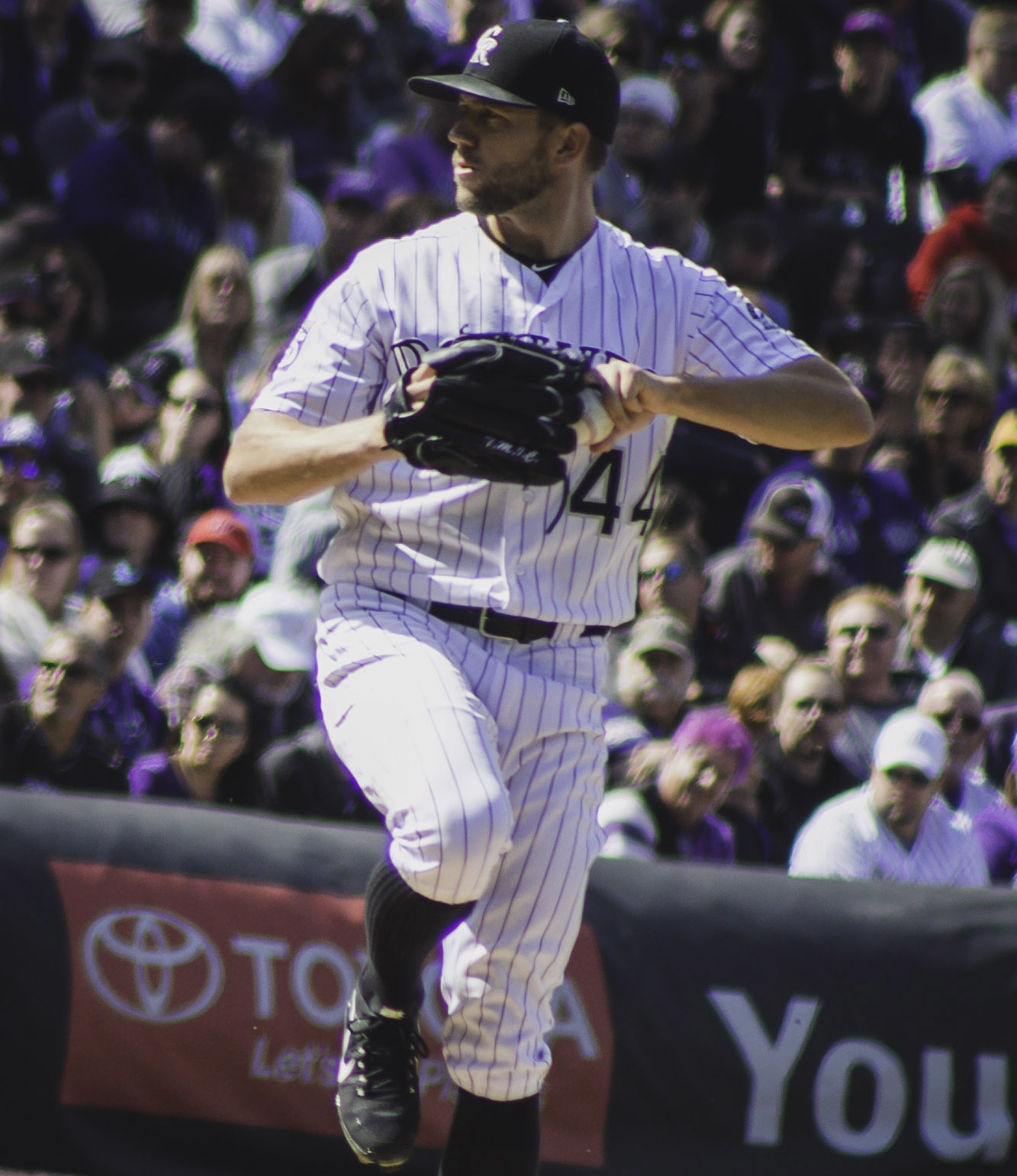
Tyler Anderson, the winner in 2014, was selected to play in the 2022 MLB All-Star Game.

Key
Record	The pitcher's win–loss record during the regular season
Saves	The number of saves earned by the pitcher, if any, during the regular season
ERA	The pitcher's earned run average (ERA) during the regular season
SO	The number of strikeouts recorded by the pitcher during the regular season
^	Indicates multiple award winners in the same year

Winners
Year	Winner	Team	Organization	Record	Saves	ERA	SO	Ref(s).
1933	George Darrow	Galveston Buccaneers	—	22–7	—	2.61	—	
1934	Ash Hillin	San Antonio Missions	St. Louis Browns	24–12	—	3.66	—	
1935	None selected							
1936	None selected							
1937	None selected							
1938	None selected							
1939	None selected							
1940	None selected							
1941	None selected							
1942	None selected							
1943	None selected (season cancelled due to World War II)							
1944	None selected (season cancelled due to World War II)							
1945	None selected (season cancelled due to World War II)							
1946	Prince Oana	Dallas Rebels	Detroit Tigers	24–10	—	2.54	123	
1947	Clarence Beers	Houston Buffaloes	St. Louis Cardinals	25–8	—	2.40	156	
1948	Harry Perkowski	Tulsa Oilers	Cincinnati Reds	22–10	—	2.98	163	
1949	Joe Landrum	Fort Worth Cats	Brooklyn Dodgers	19–11	—	2.53	121	
1950	Wayne McLeland	Dallas Eagles	—	21–8	—	2.49	—	
1951	Bob Turley	San Antonio Missions	St. Louis Browns	20–8	—	2.96	—	
1952	Hal Erickson	Dallas Eagles	Cleveland Indians	20–14	—	2.59	—	
1953	Don Fracchia	Beaumont Exporters	—	15–12	—	3.68	76	
1954	John André	Shreveport Sports	—	21–9	—	3.05	142	
1955	Red Murff	Dallas Eagles	New York Giants	27–11	—	1.99	157	
1956	Bert Thiel	Dallas Eagles	New York Giants	18–11	—	3.11	113	
1957	Tom Bowers	Dallas Eagles	New York Giants	20–8	—	3.06	90	
1958	Joe Kotrany	Dallas Rangers	—	19–10	—	2.99	128	
1959	Carroll Beringer	Victoria Rosebuds	Los Angeles Dodgers	19–5	—	3.35	109	
1960	Jack Curtis	San Antonio Missions	Chicago Cubs	19–8	—	3.57	144	
1961	Larry Maxie	Austin Senators	Milwaukee Braves	17–7	—	2.08	47	
1962	Gordie Richardson	Tulsa Oilers	St. Louis Cardinals	13–6	—	3.18	153	
1963	Camilo Estevis	Albuquerque Dukes	Los Angeles Dodgers	16–12	—	3.74	196	
1964	Chris Zachary	San Antonio Bullets	Houston Colt .45's	16–6	—	3.20	188	
1965	Ken Nixon	Austin Braves	Milwaukee Braves	19–8	—	3.10	132	
1966	Don Wilson	Amarillo Sonics	Houston Astros	18–6	—	2.21	197	
1967	John Duffie	Albuquerque Dodgers	Los Angeles Dodgers	16–9	—	2.40	171	
1968	Santiago Guzmán	Arkansas Travelers	St. Louis Cardinals	13–8	—	3.16	133	
1969	William Frost	Amarillo Giants	San Francisco Giants	16–6	0	3.28	104	
1970	Jim Flynn	Albuquerque Dodgers	Los Angeles Dodgers	19–4	0	2.64	135	
1971	Wayne Garland	Dallas–Fort Worth Spurs	Baltimore Orioles	19–5	0	1.71	154	
1972	Dave Freisleben	Alexandria Aces	San Diego Padres	17–9	0	2.32	163	
1973	Frank Tanana	El Paso Sun Kings	California Angels	16–6	0	2.71	197	
1974^	Dennis Eckersley	San Antonio Brewers	Cleveland Indians	14–3	0	3.40	163	
1974^	Randy Wiles	Arkansas Travelers	St. Louis Cardinals	8–7	1	2.56	82	
1975	None selected							
1976	None selected							
1977	None selected							
1978	None selected							
1979	None selected							
1980	None selected							
1981	Alan Fowlkes	Shreveport Captains	San Francisco Giants	14–10	0	2.79	152	
1982	Jeff Bittiger	Jackson Mets	New York Mets	12–5	0	2.96	190	
1983	Sid Fernandez	San Antonio Dodgers	Los Angeles Dodgers	13–4	0	2.82	209	
1984	Calvin Schiraldi	Jackson Mets	New York Mets	14–3	0	2.88	131	
1985	Juan Nieves	El Paso Diablos	Milwaukee Brewers	8–2	0	3.53	91	
1986	George Ferran	Shreveport Captains	San Francisco Giants	16–1	4	2.29	147	
1987	Dennis Cook	Shreveport Captains	San Francisco Giants	9–2	0	2.13	98	
1988	Blaine Beatty	Jackson Mets	New York Mets	16–8	0	2.46	103	
1989	Andy Benes	Wichita Wranglers	San Diego Padres	8–4	0	2.16	115	
1990	Anthony Young	Jackson Mets	New York Mets	15–3	0	1.65	95	
1991	Paul McClellan	Shreveport Captains	San Francisco Giants	11–1	0	2.82	63	
1992	Dan Smith	Tulsa Drillers	Texas Rangers	11–7	0	2.52	122	
1993	Ben Van Ryn	San Antonio Missions	Los Angeles Dodgers	14–4	0	2.21	144	
1994	Sid Roberson	El Paso Diablos	Milwaukee Brewers	15–8	0	2.83	119	
1995	Steve Bourgeois	Shreveport Captains	San Francisco Giants	12–3	0	2.85	91	
1996	Keith Foulke	Shreveport Captains	San Francisco Giants	12–7	0	2.76	129	
1997	Steve Woodard	El Paso Diablos	Milwaukee Brewers	14–3	0	3.17	97	
1998	José Jiménez	Arkansas Travelers	St. Louis Cardinals	15–6	0	3.11	88	
1999	Éric Gagné	San Antonio Missions	Los Angeles Dodgers	12–4	0	2.63	185	
2000	Bud Smith	Arkansas Travelers	St. Louis Cardinals	12–1	0	2.32	102	
2001	Tim Redding	Round Rock Express	Houston Astros	10–2	0	2.18	113	
2002	Kirk Saarloos	Round Rock Express	Houston Astros	10–1	0	1.40	82	
2003	Travis Blackley	San Antonio Missions	Seattle Mariners	17–3	0	2.61	144	
2004	Jeff Francis	Tulsa Drillers	Colorado Rockies	13–1	0	1.98	147	
2005	Jason Hirsh	Corpus Christi Hooks	Houston Astros	13–8	0	2.87	165	
2006	Matt Albers	Corpus Christi Hooks	Houston Astros	10–2	0	2.17	95	
2007	Josh Geer	San Antonio Missions	San Diego Padres	16–6	0	3.20	102	
2008	Vin Mazzaro	Midland RockHounds	Oakland Athletics	12–3	0	1.90	104	
2009	Samuel Deduno	Tulsa Drillers	Colorado Rockies	12–4	0	2.57	123	
2010	Blake Beavan	Frisco RoughRiders	Texas Rangers	10–5	0	2.78	68	
2011	Matt Shoemaker	Arkansas Travelers	Los Angeles Angels of Anaheim	12–5	0	2.48	129	
2012	Barret Loux	Frisco RoughRiders	Texas Rangers	14–1	0	3.47	100	
2013	David Martínez	Corpus Christi Hooks	Houston Astros	14–2	1	2.02	86	
2014	Tyler Anderson	Tulsa Drillers	Colorado Rockies	7–4	0	1.98	106	
2015	Nate Smith	Arkansas Travelers	Los Angeles Angels of Anaheim	8–4	0	2.48	81	
2016	Chase De Jong	Tulsa Drillers	Los Angeles Dodgers	14–5	0	2.86	125	
2017	Dakota Hudson	Springfield Cardinals	St. Louis Cardinals	9–4	0	2.53	77	
2018	Logan Allen	San Antonio Missions	San Diego Padres	10–6	0	2.75	125	
2019	Darren McCaughan	Arkansas Travelers	Seattle Mariners	7–5	0	2.89	89	
2020	None selected (season cancelled due to COVID-19 pandemic)							
2021	Cole Winn	Frisco RoughRiders	Texas Rangers	3–3	0	2.31	97	
2022	Taylor Dollard	Arkansas Travelers	Seattle Mariners	16–2	0	2.25	131	
2023	Rhett Kouba	Corpus Christi Hooks	Houston Astros	7–5	0	3.27	118	
2024	Tink Hence	Springfield Cardinals	St. Louis Cardinals	4–3	0	2.71	109	
2025	Ixan Henderson	Springfield Cardinals	St. Louis Cardinals	9–7	0	2.59	134	
2026	Kade Anderson	Arkansas Travelers	Seattle Mariners	10–1	0	1.06	135	

== Wins by team ==
Active Texas League teams appear in bold.

Team	Award(s)	Year(s)
**San Antonio Missions** (San Antonio Bullets/Brewers/Dodgers)	11	1934, 1951, 1960, 1964, 1974, 1983, 1993, 1999, 2003, 2007, 2018
**Arkansas Travelers**	9	1968, 1974, 1998, 2000, 2011, 2015, 2019, 2022, 2026
Dallas Rangers (Dallas Rebels/Eagles)	7	1946, 1950, 1952, 1955, 1956, 1957, 1958
Shreveport Captains	6	1981, 1986, 1987, 1991, 1995, 1996
**Tulsa Drillers**	5	1992, 2004, 2009, 2017, 2016
**Corpus Christi Hooks**	4	2005, 2006, 2013, 2023
El Paso Diablos (El Paso Sun Kings)	4	1973, 1985, 1994, 1997
Jackson Mets	4	1982, 1984, 1988, 1990
Albuquerque Dodgers (Albuquerque Dukes)	3	1963, 1967, 1970
**Frisco RoughRiders**	3	2010, 2012, 2021
**Ozarks Springbirds** (Springfield Cardinals)	3	2017, 2024, 2025
Amarillo Giants (Amarillo Sonics)	2	1966, 1969
Austin Braves (Austin Senators)	2	1961, 1965
Round Rock Express	2	2001, 2002
Tulsa Oilers	2	1948, 1962
Alexandria Aces	1	1972
Beaumont Exporters	1	1953
Dallas–Fort Worth Spurs	1	1971
Fort Worth Cats	1	1949
Galveston Buccaneers	1	1933
Houston Buffaloes	1	1947
**Midland RockHounds**	1	2008
Shreveport Sports	1	1954
Victoria Rosebuds	1	1959
Wichita Wranglers	1	1989

== Wins by organization ==
Active Texas League–Major League Baseball affiliations appear in bold.

Organization	Award(s)	Year(s)
San Francisco Giants (New York Giants)	10	1955, 1956, 1957, 1969, 1981, 1986, 1987, 1991, 1995, 1996
**Los Angeles Dodgers** (Brooklyn Dodgers)	9	1949, 1959, 1963, 1967, 1970, 1983, 1993, 1999, 2016
**St. Louis Cardinals**	9	1947, 1962, 1968, 1974, 1998, 2000, 2017, 2024, 2025
**Houston Astros** (Houston Colt .45's)	8	1964, 1966, 2001, 2002, 2005, 2006, 2013, 2023
New York Mets	4	1982, 1984, 1988, 1990
**San Diego Padres**	4	1972, 1989, 2007, 2018
**Seattle Mariners**	4	2003, 2019, 2022, 2026
**Texas Rangers**	4	1992, 2010, 2012, 2021
Baltimore Orioles (St. Louis Browns)	3	1934, 1951, 1971
Colorado Rockies	3	2004, 2009, 2014
Los Angeles Angels (California Angels)	3	1973, 2011, 2015
Milwaukee Brewers	3	1985, 1994, 1997
Atlanta Braves (Milwaukee Braves)	2	1961, 1965
Cleveland Guardians (Cleveland Indians)	2	1952, 1974
Chicago Cubs	1	1960
Cincinnati Reds	1	1948
Detroit Tigers	1	1946
**Oakland Athletics**	1	2008
