= Adam Hill =

Adam Hill may refer to:

- Adam Hill (rugby union) (born 1986), New Zealand rugby union player
- Adam Hill (baseball) (born 1997), American baseball player
- Blak Douglas, Australian artist and musician formerly known as Adam Hill

== See also ==
- Adam Hills, Australian comedian and TV presenter
- Adam Hills (politician) (1880–1941), British politician in the Labour Party
