= 2014 Little League World Series =

Children's baseball tournament

Tournament details
- Dates: August 14–August 24
- Teams: 16

Final positions
- Champions: Seoul Little League; Seoul, South Korea
- Runners-up: (United States) Mountain Ridge Little League; Las Vegas, Nevada

The 2014 Little League World Series, held in South Williamsport, Pennsylvania, started on August 14 and ended on August 24, 2014. Eight teams from the United States, and eight from the rest of the world, competed in the 68th edition of the Little League World Series (LLWS). This was the first LLWS to feature entire rosters of players born in the 21st century.

All games took place at Howard J. Lamade Stadium and Little League Volunteer Stadium. ESPN again broadcast the games. Seoul Little League of Seoul, South Korea, defeated Jackie Robinson West Little League of Chicago, Illinois, 8–4, to win the championship.

On February 11, 2015, Jackie Robinson West had all of its tournament wins forfeited after it was found that the team used ineligible players from outside the Chicago area. Mountain Ridge Little League of Las Vegas, Nevada, was named the official U.S. champion.

== Teams ==
United States	International
Chicago, Illinois; Great Lakes Region; Jackie Robinson West Little League (Note: Little League Baseball subsequently ruled the Jackie Robinson West Little League of Chicago was in violation of geographical restrictions, and retroactively awarded the Great Lakes Regional title to the New Albany Little League of New Albany, Indiana, which had lost to Jackie Robinson West in the Great Lakes Regional final. The players and coaches of New Albany were invited guests to the 2015 tournament. See also Disqualification of Jackie Robinson West Little League from the 2014 Little League World Series.)	Seoul, South Korea; Asia-Pacific and Middle East Region; Seoul Little League
Philadelphia, Pennsylvania; Mid-Atlantic Region; Taney Little League	Perth, Western Australia; Australia Region; Perth Metro North Little League
Rapid City, South Dakota; Midwest Region; Canyon Lake Little League	Vancouver, British Columbia; Canada Region; South Vancouver Little League
Cumberland, Rhode Island; New England Region; Cumberland American Little League	Humacao, Puerto Rico; Caribbean Region; Miguel Luzunaris Little League
(Washington (state)) Lynnwood, Washington; Northwest Region; Lynnwood Pacific	Brno, Czech Republic; Europe and Africa Region; South Moravia Little League
Nashville, Tennessee; Southeast Region; South Nashville Little League	Tokyo; Japan Region; Tokyo Kitasuna Little League
Pearland, Texas; Southwest Region; Pearland East Little League	Maracaibo, Venezuela; Latin America Region; Coquivacoa Little League
Las Vegas, Nevada; West Region; Mountain Ridge Little League	Guadalupe, Nuevo León; Mexico Region; Linda Vista Little League

== Team rosters ==
International
Asia-Pacific Seoul, South Korea	Australia (Western Australia) Perth, WA	Canada (British Columbia) Vancouver, BC	Caribbean Humacao, Puerto Rico	Europe-Africa Brno, Czech Republic	Japan Tokyo	Latin America Maracaibo, Venezuela	Mexico (Mexico) Guadalupe, Nuevo León
Dong Hwan Ahn Hae Chan Choi Sang Hoon Han Jae Yeong Hwang Jin Woo Jeon Dong Hyeok Kim Shane Jaemin Kim Gyu Heon Kwon Tae Min Moon Ji Ho Park Dong Wan Sin Chan Oh Min Jun Hyeok Yun	Etienne Charette Matthew Coleman Carter Dowling Calvin Eissens Benjamin Hewett Callum Johnson Blake Monaghan Javier Pelkonen Tarrant Reimers Nicholas Riley Callum Schipp Daniel Stephenson Zak Taylor Jordano Vivona	Rod Betonio Nico Cole Vicarte Domingo Madjik Mackenzie Ryan Mah Emma March Evan March Joshua Matsui Michael Oyhenart Joseph Sinclair Daniel Suarez Matthew Suarez	Emanuel Alicea Adrian Colon Jeremy Colon Felix Cruz Erick Figueroa Edward Gonzalez Joseph Gonzalez Oscar Lopez Nieves Peter Marquez Alvin Martinez Janiel Perez Yadiel Santana Joel Santos Abimael Torres	Vojtech Blaha Ondrej Chlubna Patrik Kadrnozka Marek Krejcirik Miroslav Krivanek Lukas Maly Tomas Oppelt Lukas Pacal Milan Prokop Martin Regner Roman Seifer Viktor Svida Adam Vavra	Joichiro Fujimatsu Taro Hashiguchi Keisuke Hirano Shozo Kamata Suguru Kanamori Yuta Komaba Ryoma Mitsui Arata Nishikawa Takuma Takahashi Ren Takeuchi Kengo Tomita Shingo Tomita Hayato Ueshima Hiromu Yokoyama	Andrew Andrade Jose Luis Atencio Diomel Bracho Jorge Cabrera Asnaldo Caicedo Jose de la Pena Andres Escalona Andres Inciarte Edgardo Marriaga Ronny Medina Alberson Mogollon Julio Rejon Greybell Salom Cesar Leonardo Vivas	Jesus Bernal Miguel de la Fuente Alex Garcia Juan Garza Encarnacion Gonzalez Gabriel Heredia Ruy Martinez Daniel Quiroz David Ramirez Rolando Reyna Luis Rodriguez Aldair Tellez Erick Vela Abraham Zambrano

United States
Great Lakes (Illinois) Chicago, IL	Mid-Atlantic (Pennsylvania) Philadelphia, PA	Midwest (South Dakota) Rapid City, SD	New England (Rhode Island) Cumberland, RI	Northwest (Washington (state)) Lynnwood, WA	Southeast (Tennessee) Nashville, TN	Southwest (Texas) Pearland, TX	West (Nevada) Las Vegas, NV
Jaheim Benton Cameron Bufford D.J. Butler Brandon Green Trey Hondras Joshua Houston Ed Howard Marquis Jackson Pierce Jones Eddie King Prentiss Luster Lawrence Noble Darion Radcliff	Scott Bandura Kai Cummings Carter Davis Mo'ne Davis Jahli Hendricks Erik Lipson Jack Rice Joe Richardson Tai Shanahan Eli Simon Zion Spearman Jared Sprague-Lott	Colton Hartford Matthew Hegre Jake Kostenbauer Mason Litz Logan Miller Bridger Nesbit Dylan Richey Adam Salter True Synhorst Daniel Vigoren Cooper Voorhees Blake Weaver	John Belisle Trey Bourque Nick Croteau C.J. Davock Addison Kopack Mason Matos Sean Meers Tyler Provost Tyler Shaw Jayden Struble Trey Thibeault Brendan Wright	Read Carr Robley Corsi Tygan Duncan Tyler Durbin Ben Grant Nate King Logan Kruse Ian Michael Tai Starchman Karsen Tjarneberg Matthew Turcotte Mason Vaughn Colton Walsh	Drew Byers Tyler Finley Ian Fry Brian Garcia Tyler Hammonds Robert Hassell Houston High Garrett Justice Blake Money Cade Reynolds Sam Slaughter Barrett Smith Eston Snider	Matthew Adams Clayton Broeder Landon Donley Hunter Dopslauf Joshua Gabino Michael Groover Bryce Laird Walter Maeker Jonathan Newman Layne Roblyer Brandon Sliwinski Cole Smajstrla Presley Smith Christian Terranova	Alex Barker Payton Brooks Dallan Cave Dominic Clayton Josiah Cromwick Zach Hare Justin Hausner Brennan Holligan Dillon Jones Ausin Kryszczuk Drew Laspaluto Andrew Matulich Brad Stone Josh Zuehlsdorff

== Results ==
The draw to determine the opening round pairings took place on June 11, 2014.

After the tournament, Jackie Robinson West Little League had all of their wins, including the U.S. Championship, forfeited. Any of their wins are officially considered a 6–0 loss. The scores of their games, as played during the tournament, were as follows:

Jackie Robinson West Little League
Bracket	Round	Score	Opponent
Winners	Round 1	12–2 (F/5)	Washington
Winners	Round 2	2–13 (F/4)	Nevada
Losers	Round 2	8–7	Rhode Island
Losers	Round 3	6–1	Texas
Losers	U.S. Semifinal	6–5	Pennsylvania
U.S. Championship		7–5	Nevada
World Championship		4–8	South Korea

=== United States bracket ===
Upper round 1	Upper round 2	Upper final	Final
August 14 – Game 2
Illinois	12 Forfeit
August 17 – Game 14 (F/4)
(Washington (state)) Washington	2
Illinois	2
August 14 – Game 4 (F/5)
Nevada	13
South Dakota	2
August 20 – Game 24
Nevada	12
Nevada	8
August 15 – Game 6
Pennsylvania	1
Pennsylvania	4
August 17 – Game 16
Tennessee	0
Pennsylvania	7
August 15 – Game 8
Texas	6
Texas	6	August 23 – U.S. championship
Rhode Island	4	Nevada	5
Illinois	7 Forfeit
Lower round 1	Lower round 2	Lower round 3	Lower final
August 18 – Game 18
August 16 – Game 10	Washington	4	August 21 – Game 26
Washington	7	Texas	11	August 19 – Game 22	Pennsylvania	5
South Dakota	5	Texas	1	Illinois	6 Forfeit
August 18 – Game 20	Illinois	6 Forfeit
August 16 – Game 12	Rhode Island	7
Tennessee	7	Illinois	8 Forfeit
Rhode Island	8

=== International bracket ===
Upper round 1	Upper round 2	Upper final	Final
August 14 – Game 1
South Korea	10
August 17 – Game 13
Czech Republic	3
South Korea	8
August 14 – Game 3 (F/4)
Puerto Rico	5
Puerto Rico	16
August 26 – Game 20
Australia	3
South Korea	4
August 15 – Game 5
Japan	1
Mexico	4
August 17 – Game 15
Canada	3
Mexico	5
August 15 – Game 7
Japan	9
Venezuela	0	August 23 – International championship
Japan	1	South Korea	12
Japan	3
Lower round 1	Lower round 2	Lower round 3	Lower final
August 18 – Game 17
August 16 – Game 9	Mexico	6	August 21 – Game 25 (F/5)
Czech Republic	1	Australia	2	August 19 – Game 21 (F/5)	Japan	12
Australia	10	Mexico	11	Mexico	1
August 18 – Game 19	Venezuela	2
August 16 – Game 11 (F/5)	Venezuela	2
Canada	0	Puerto Rico	1
Venezuela	10

=== Crossover games ===
Teams that lost their first two games played a crossover game against a team from the other side of the bracket that also lost its first two games. These games were labeled Game A and Game B. This provided teams who were already eliminated the opportunity to play a third game.

Game A
August 18 – Lamade Stadium
Czech Republic	3
South Dakota	5

Game B
August 19 – Lamade Stadium
Canada	9
Tennessee	12

=== Consolation game ===
The consolation game is played between the loser of the United States championship and the loser of the International championship.

Consolation game
August 24 – Lamade Stadium
Japan	5
Nevada	0

=== World Championship ===
Little League World Championship
August 24 – Lamade Stadium
South Korea	8
Illinois	4

2014 Little League World Series Champions
Seoul Little League
Seoul, South Korea

== Jackie Robinson West ==
Team Jackie Robinson West was the first all black team to compete in the tournament in several decades. Hailing from the Washington Heights area of Chicago, the team made it all the way to the World Championship before ultimately falling to a team from South Korea.

As the team rose to prominence, Evergreen Park, Illinois, Little League official Chris Janes began to investigate personal information pertaining to players of the Jackie Robinson West team, finding that multiple players on the team lived outside the team's designated boundary region. He later discovered that the team had used a falsified boundary map which covered a wider area than other teams in the region had agreed to. On February 11, 2015, based on Chris Janes' findings, the team's wins and U.S. titles were forfeited for its use of ineligible players. The U.S. title was retroactively awarded to Mountain Ridge Little League of Las Vegas. The Great Lakes title was also stripped from Jackie Robinson West, and given to the team they beat in the regional championship, New Albany, Indiana.

== Notable players ==
- Mo'ne Davis (Mid-Atlantic) – First girl to earn a win and throw a shutout in LLWS history; appeared on the cover of Sports Illustrated
- Ed Howard (Great Lakes) – First-round pick in the 2020 MLB draft by the Chicago Cubs

Coaches

- Pavel Chadim (Europe-Africa Region) - Manager of Czech Republic national baseball team at the 2023 World Baseball Classic

=== Major League Baseball ===
- Scott Bandura (Mid-Atlantic) – Outfielder for the San Francisco Giants
- Robert Hassell III (Southeast) – Outfielder for the Washington Nationals

=== National Hockey League ===
- Jayden Struble (New England) - Defenseman for the Montreal Canadiens of the NHL
