= Jared Kelley =

American baseball player (born 2001)

Free agent
- Pitcher
- Born: October 3, 2001 (age 25); Victoria, Texas, U.S.
- Bats: Right Throws: Right

Jared Matthew Kelley (born October 3, 2001) is an American professional baseball pitcher who is a free agent. He was selected by the Chicago White Sox with the 47th pick of the 2020 MLB draft.

== Amateur career ==
Jared Kelley grew up in Refugio, Texas and attended Refugio High School, where he played baseball and was a member of the varsity football team. He played on the varsity baseball team as a freshman and was named the District 32 Newcomer of the Year after going 7–1 on the mound with a 1.16 ERA, and 109 strikeouts in 60.1 innings pitched and batting .376. Kelley was the starting quarterback for the Bobcats and was named honorable mention All-State and the District 15-2A Offensive Player of the Year and helped lead Refugio to its third straight state championship game appearance. Despite his success, he decided to quit football after the season to focus on baseball. In baseball, Kelley posted a 9–2 record and a 0.34 earned-run average with 153 strikeouts. As a junior, he went 11–0 with a 0.24 ERA and 144 strikeouts in 65 innings pitched and was named to the first team All-South Texas. Kelley pitched four perfect innings in a 16–0 win against Agua Dulce High School, striking out all 12 batters he faced in succession.

Kelley pitched for Team USA during the fall in the Under-18 Pan American Championship, helping the team win a gold medal, and played in the 2019 Under Armour All-America game in the following summer, starting the game and striking out five in two innings. He also played in the 2019 Perfect Game All American game, throwing a scoreless second inning for his West squad in a 4–2 win. Kelley initially committed to play college baseball at Texas Christian University as a freshman, but de-committed and announced that he would instead play at the University of Texas. Kelley entered his senior year as a top prospect for the 2020 Major League Baseball draft and was rated the best high school prospect by MLB.com. Kelley was named the 2020 Gatorade Player of the Year after posting 3–0 record with a 0.00 ERA and 34 strikeouts in 12 innings before the season was cut short due to the coronavirus pandemic. Kelley finished his high school career with a 32–3 record with 0.43 ERA and had 23 pitching appearances without surrendering a hit.

== Professional career ==
Kelley was selected by the Chicago White Sox with the 47th overall pick in the 2020 Major League Baseball draft. Kelley signed with the White Sox on June 27, 2020, for a bonus of $3 million. He was invited to the White Sox alternate training site.

Kelley was assigned to the Low-A Kannapolis Cannon Ballers for the 2021 season. He missed time during the season due to a shoulder injury. In 12 starts, Kelley went 0–7 with a 7.61 ERA, 27 strikeouts, and 26 walks over 23 2/3 innings. On August 1, 2026, Kelley was released by the White Sox.
