= El Paso Chihuahuas =

- Founded in 2014; El Paso, Texas

Team logo	Cap insignia

Minor league affiliations
- Class: Triple-A (2014–present)
- League: Pacific Coast League (2014–present)
- Division: East Division

Major league affiliations
- Team: San Diego Padres (2014–present)

Minor league titles
- League titles (1): 2016
- Conference titles (2): 2016; 2017
- Division titles (5): 2015; 2016; 2017; 2018; 2022

Team data
- Name: El Paso Chihuahuas (2014–present)
- Colors: Black, red, tan, white
- Mascot: Chico
- Ballpark: Southwest University Park (2014–present)
- Owner/ Operator: MountainStar Sports
- General manager: Brad Taylor
- Manager: Pete Zamora
- Website: milb.com/el-paso

The El Paso Chihuahuas are a Minor League Baseball team based in El Paso, Texas. The Chihuahuas compete in the Pacific Coast League (PCL) as the Triple-A affiliate of the San Diego Padres. The team plays its home games at Southwest University Park, which opened in 2014. The Chihuahuas moved to El Paso from Tucson, Arizona, where they were known as the Tucson Padres. The team played in the PCL until the 2021 restructuring of the minor leagues when they shifted to the Triple-A West, but this league was renamed the PCL in 2022. The Chihuahuas won the PCL championship in 2016.

== History ==
=== Previous teams ===
The Chihuahuas' heritage can be traced back to the establishment of the original Los Angeles Angels in 1903. These Angels (the namesake of the current Los Angeles Angels) were one of the eight "core teams" of the PCL during its heyday in the 1950s. In 1957, the team was sold to Brooklyn Dodgers owner Walter O'Malley as a harbinger of the Dodgers' move to Los Angeles the following year.

For 1958, the Angels moved to Spokane, Washington, and became the (original) Spokane Indians. In 1972, the team moved again, this time to Albuquerque, New Mexico. As the Albuquerque Dukes, many of the team's star players and manager Tommy Lasorda formed the core of a Dodgers franchise that won the 1977, 1978, and 1981 pennants and 1981 World Series title.

After nearly two decades, the Dukes moved to Portland, Oregon, and became the latest version of the Portland Beavers in 2001. That franchise lasted 10 seasons until the inability to get a new ballpark to replace what is now Providence Park (renovated to accommodate the Portland Timbers of Major League Soccer) led to a relocation. At first, the plan was to move to Escondido, California, about 40 miles (64 km) north of San Diego, as a club owned by the San Diego Padres. But once again, a new ballpark proved elusive, and the team landed in Tucson, Arizona, as the Tucson Padres.

=== Coming to El Paso ===
On July 30, 2012, the Pacific Coast League gave preliminary approval to MountainStar Sports Group to buy the Padres, with the intent to relocate the franchise to El Paso for the 2014 season. The deal was approved on September 17, 2012, pending approval for a ballpark by the city council. Ballpark approval was made on September 18, with the mayor deciding not to veto the deal. The final sale of the Padres to MountainStar Sports was approved on September 26, 2012.

A name-the-team contest was held to decide the team's nickname. Finalists were Aardvarks, Buckaroos, Chihuahuas, Desert Gators, and Sun Dogs. The winning name was submitted by Shae Vierra. On October 22, 2013, the Chihuahuas name, logo and colors were announced. The name is a reference to the Chihuahuan Desert encompassing the area. The team logo is a growling chihuahua dog. In 2014, the team adopted a chihuahua dog from the American Humane Society and allowed fans to vote for her name by donating one dollar to the Humane Society. The winning name was Lola.

Due to construction delays at the site of Southwest University Park, the Chihuahuas played their first 24 games of the 2014 season on the road, including a four-game series against the Reno Aces that was moved from El Paso to Tucson. The home opener finally took place on April 28, a 2–1 loss to the Fresno Grizzlies.

in 2014, the team wore a jersey design featuring a photograph of the face of a chihuahua dog. The jersey design received widespread and was described as the "best jersey in sports" by USA Today. The jersey design was used again for an event in 2023, and the game-worn ones were sold at auction for charity.

On September 17, 2016, the Chihuahuas plated a run in the 11th inning to defeat the Oklahoma City Dodgers 4–3 to claim the El Paso's first ever PCL championship in just the franchise's third year of existence.

In conjunction with Major League Baseball's restructuring of Minor League Baseball in 2021, the Chihuahuas were organized into the Triple-A West. El Paso ended the season in fifth place in the Eastern Division with a 46–74 record. No playoffs were held to determine a league champion; instead, the team with the best regular-season record was declared the winner. However, 10 games that had been postponed from the start of the season were reinserted into the schedule as a postseason tournament called the Triple-A Final Stretch in which all 30 Triple-A clubs competed for the highest winning percentage. El Paso finished the tournament tied for 13th place with a 5–5 record. In 2022, the Triple-A West became known as the Pacific Coast League, the name historically used by the regional circuit prior to the 2021 reorganization.

== Season-by-season records ==
Table key
League	The team's final position in the league standings
Division	The team's final position in the divisional standings
GB	Games behind the team that finished in first place in the division that season
‡	Class champions (2014–present)
†	League champions (2014–present)
§	Conference champions (2014–2020)
*	Division champions (2014–2022)

Season-by-season records
Season	League	Regular-season					Postseason			MLB affiliate	Ref.
Season	League	Record	Win %	League	Division	GB	Record	Win %	Result	MLB affiliate	Ref.
2014	PCL	72–72	.500	10th	2nd	9	—	—	Result	—	San Diego Padres
2015 *	PCL	78–66	.542	5th (tie)	1st	—	1–3	.250	Won Pacific Conference Southern Division title Lost Pacific Conference title vs. Fresno Grizzlies, 3–1	San Diego Padres	
2016 * § †	PCL	73–70	.510	5th (tie)	1st	—	6–3	.667	Won Pacific Conference Southern Division title Won Pacific Conference title vs. Tacoma Rainiers, 3–1; Won PCL championship vs. Oklahoma City Dodgers, 3–1; Lost Triple-A championship vs. Scranton/Wilkes-Barre RailRiders	San Diego Padres	
2017 * §	PCL	73–69	.514	5th	1st	—	5–3	.625	Won Pacific Conference Southern Division title Won Pacific Conference title vs. Reno Aces, 3–0; Lost PCL championship vs. Memphis Redbirds, 3–2	San Diego Padres	
2018 *	PCL	82–57	.590	2nd (tie)	1st	—	2–3	.400	Won Pacific Conference Southern Division title Lost Pacific Conference title vs. Fresno Grizzlies, 3–2	San Diego Padres	
2019	PCL	80–60	.571	3rd (tie)	2nd	3	—	—	—	San Diego Padres	
2020	PCL	Season cancelled (COVID-19 pandemic)								San Diego Padres	
2021	AAAW	51–79 (Note: In 2021, the team with the best record at the end of the regular-season was declared the Triple-A West champion. El Paso had a 46–74 (.383) record, 27 games behind first place, which put them 10th in the league and 5th in their division. The regular-season was followed by the Triple-A Final Stretch, a 10-game postseason tournament in which all 30 Triple-A clubs competed for the highest winning percentage. El Paso finished the tournament tied for 13th place with a 5–5 (.500) record.)	.392	10th	5th	24	—	—	—	San Diego Padres	
2022 *	PCL	85–65	.567	1st	2nd	—	0–1	.000	Won Eastern Division title Lost PCL championship vs. Reno Aces, 1–0	San Diego Padres	
2023	PCL	62–88	.413	9th	4th	29	—	—	—	San Diego Padres	
2024	PCL	64–86	.427	9th	4th	29 1/2	—	—	—	San Diego Padres	
2025	PCL	81–68	.544	4th	2nd	2 1/2	—	—	—	San Diego Padres	
2026	PCL	60–90	.400	10th	5th	29 1/2	—	—	—	San Diego Padres	
Totals	—	861–870	.497	—	—	—	14–13	.519	—	—	—

== Notable players ==
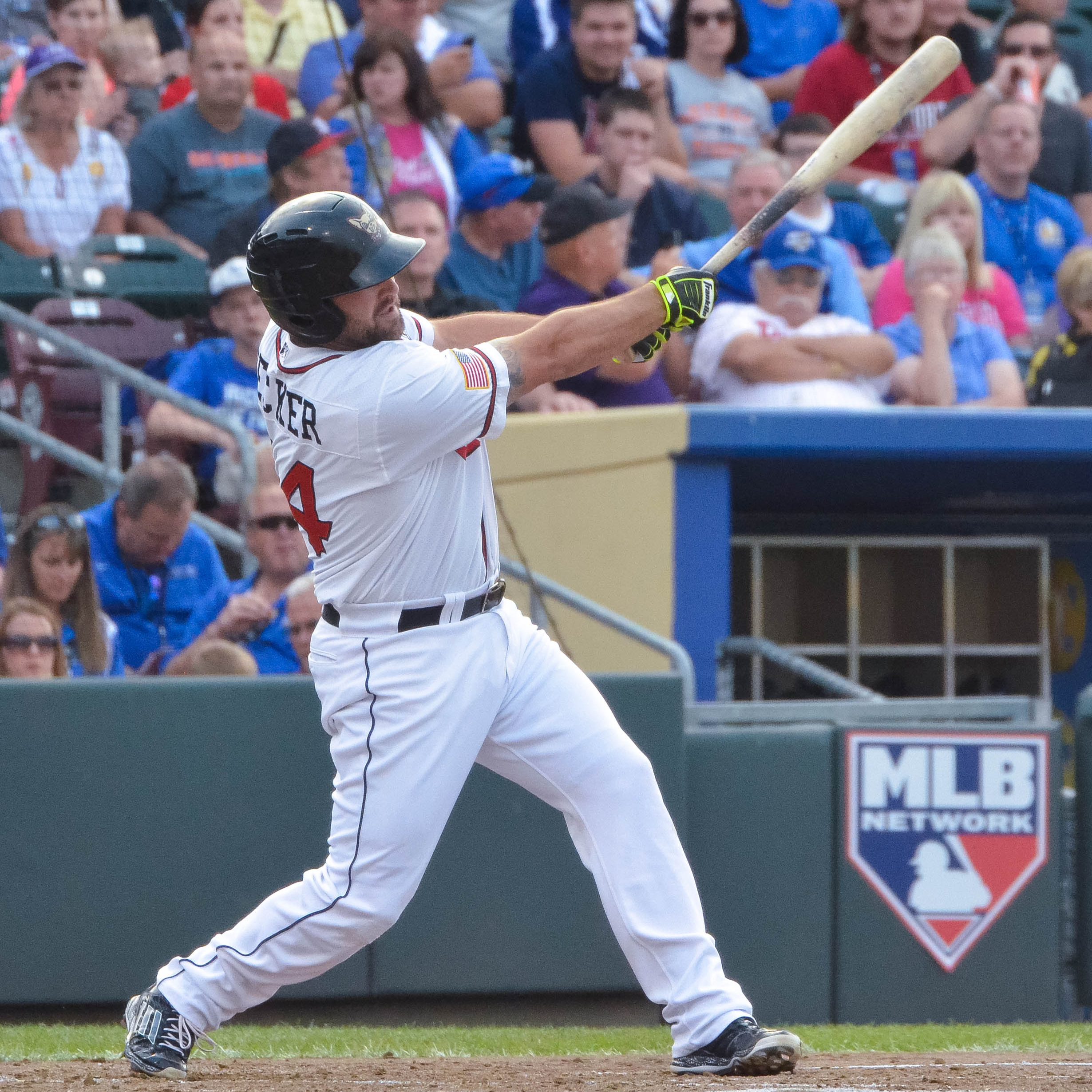
Cody Decker, during his tenure with the Chihuahuas, at 2015 Triple-A All-Star Game

- Abraham Almonte
- Billy Buckner
- Robinson Cano
- Nelson Cruz
- Cody Decker
- Jeff Francoeur
- Rocky Gale
- Jake Lemmerman
- Ramiro Peña
- Kevin Quackenbush
- Carlos Quentin
- Seth Rosin
- Cory Spangenberg
- Fernando Tatis Jr
- Melvin Upton Jr.
- Brett Wallace

== Roster ==
El Paso Chihuahuas roster
Players	Coaches/Other
Pitchers: 52 Daison Acosta; 36 Jason Adam #*; 39 Ty Adcock; 57 Sean Boyle; 54 Jhony Brito *; 28 Hans Crouse *; 34 Evan Fitterer; 43 Logan Gillaspie; 50 Trevor Gott *; 2 Luis Gutierrez; 25 Garrett Hawkins *; 24 Jagger Haynes; 38 Brent Honeywell *; 37 Alek Jacob *; 18 Ian Koenig; 30 Nick Pivetta #*; 55 Ethan Routzahn; 41 JP Sears *; 40 Hunter Stratton *; Catchers: 9 Rodolfo Duran *; 24 Freddy Fermin #*; 11 Oswaldo Linares; 33 Anthony Vilar; Infielders: 5 Marcos Castañon; 29 Victor Duarte; 4 Clay Dungan; 7 Mason McCoy *; 29 José Miranda; 14 Nick Pratto *; 8 Nick Solak *; 20 Rosman Verdugo; 10 Gage Workman *; Outfielders: 26 Bryce Johnson *; 30 Braedon Karpathios; 33 Kai Murphy ~; 27 Carlos Rodríguez; 20 Samad Taylor #*; Designated hitters: 15 Miguel Andujar #*; 17 Will Wagner *	Manager: 3 Pete Zamora; Coaches: 16 Morgan Burkhart (bench); 13 Miguel Del Castillo (bench); 45 Jimmy Jones (assistant pitching); 12 Scott Mitchell (pitching); 53 Ben Rosenthal (hitting); 60-day injured list: 8 José Leclerc; 36 Eli Villalobos (full season); 7-day injured list; * On San Diego Padres 40-man roster; ~ Development list; # Rehab assignment; ∞ Reserve list; ‡ Restricted list; § Suspended list; † Temporarily inactive list; Roster updated September 15, 2026; Transactions; → More rosters: MiLB • Pacific Coast League; → San Diego Padres minor league players
