= Zach McCambley =

American baseball player (born 1999)

Cincinnati Reds – No. 62
- Pitcher
- Born: May 4, 1999 (age 27); Netcong, New Jersey, U.S.
- Bats: Left Throws: Right

MLB debut
- June 3, 2026, for the Cincinnati Reds

MLB statistics (through 2026 season)
- Win–loss record: 0–0
- Earned run average: 4.05
- Strikeouts: 14
- Stats at Baseball Reference

Teams
- Cincinnati Reds (2026–present)

Zachary Tyler McCambley (born May 4, 1999) is an American professional baseball pitcher for the Cincinnati Reds of Major League Baseball (MLB).

== Amateur career ==
McCambley attended Pocono Mountain East High School in Swiftwater, Pennsylvania, where he went 6–1 with a 1.70 ERA and ninety strikeouts as a senior in 2017. Unselected in the 2017 Major League Baseball draft, he enrolled at Coastal Carolina University where he played college baseball.

As a freshman at Coastal Carolina in 2018, McCambley went 3–0 with a 3.14 ERA over 18 games, striking out fifty batters over 48 2/3 innings. In 2019, he appeared in 22 games (11 starts), going 6–3 with a 5.21 ERA, 76 strikeouts, and 27 walks over 67 1/3 innings. He played in the Cape Cod Baseball League for the Cotuit Kettleers that summer, posting a 1.74 ERA over 20 2/3 innings. In 2020, McCambley pitched 25 innings in which he went 3–1 with a 1.80 ERA and 32 strikeouts before the season was cancelled due to the COVID-19 pandemic.

== Professional career ==
=== Miami Marlins ===
McCambley was selected by the Miami Marlins in the third round of the 2020 Major League Baseball draft. McCambley signed with Miami and made his professional debut in 2021 with the Beloit Snappers of the High-A Central. He was promoted to the Pensacola Blue Wahoos of the Double-A South in early July. Over twenty starts between the two clubs, McCambley pitched to a 3–10 record, a 4.36 ERA, 120 strikeouts, and 26 walks over 97 innings. He returned to Pensacola for the 2022 season. Over 19 starts, he went 6–8 with a 5.65 ERA and 101 strikeouts over 94 innings. He was selected to play in the Arizona Fall League with the Peoria Javelinas. He missed time during the 2023 season due to injury, but still pitched 44 2/3 innings between the Rookie-level Florida Complex League Marlins, the Jupiter Hammerheads of the Single-A Florida State League, and Pensacola, going 6–0 with a 3.22 ERA and 51 strikeouts.

McCambley was assigned to Pensacola to open the 2024 season, but pitched only 22 2/3 innings due to injury. In 2025, McCambley played with Pensacola and the Jacksonville Jumbo Shrimp of the Triple-A International League, going 2–3 with a 2.90 ERA and 83 strikeouts over 62 innings pitched in relief.

On December 10, 2025, the Philadelphia Phillies selected McCambley in the Rule 5 draft. On March 22, 2026, McCambley was returned to the Marlins organization. He was assigned to Jacksonville and appeared in 13 games in which he had a 1–1 record and 2.36 ERA.

=== Cincinnati Reds ===
On May 21, 2026, the Marlins traded McCambley to the Cincinnati Reds in exchange for Rece Hinds. Upon joining the Reds organization, made two appearances for the Triple-A Louisville Bats and recorded a 2.45 ERA with five strikeouts across 3 2/3 innings pitched. On June 2, McCambley was selected to the 40-man roster and promoted to the major leagues for the first time. He made his MLB debut on June 3 against the Kansas City Royals and pitched 2/3 of an inning, recording the last two outs of the ninth inning for the Reds by striking out Carter Jensen and Salvador Perez. McCambley made 11 relief appearances for the Reds and had a 4.05 ERA and 14 strikeouts over 13 1/3 innings. With Louisville, he ended the season with a 4–1 record, a 2.84 ERA, and 40 strikeouts across 37 2/3 innings.

== See also ==
- Rule 5 draft results
