= Adisyn Coffey =

Tampa Bay Rays
- Pitcher
- Born: January 22, 1999 (age 27); Albany, Indiana, U.S.
- Bats: Right Throws: Right
- Stats at Baseball Reference

Adisyn Matthew Coffey (born January 22, 1999) is an American professional baseball pitcher in the Tampa Bay Rays organization.

== Amateur career ==
Coffey attended Delta High School in Muncie, Indiana, where he played on the baseball team. He graduated in 2017 and enrolled at Arizona State University to play college baseball. He transferred after his freshman year to San Jacinto College, and then transferred once again to Wabash Valley College for the 2020 season.

== Professional career ==
=== Chicago White Sox ===
Coffey was selected by the Chicago White Sox in the third round of the 2020 Major League Baseball draft. He signed for $50,000.

Coffey underwent Tommy John surgery after signing with the White Sox, and thus did not make his professional debut until 2022 with the Kannapolis Cannon Ballers. He went 4–3 with a 5.23 ERA over 51 innings. He opened the 2023 season with the Winston-Salem Dash and was promoted to the Birmingham Barons in mid-July. Over forty relief appearances between the two teams, Coffey went 1–2 with a 4.82 ERA and 53 strikeouts. He was selected to play in the Arizona Fall League for the Glendale Desert Dogs after the season.

Coffey opened the 2024 season with Birmingham and was promoted to the Charlotte Knights in late May. While playing for Charlotte on June 16, 2024, he was part of a seven–pitcher no-hitter against the Durham Bulls. Over fifty relief appearances between Birmingham and Charlotte, Coffey went 5–2 with a 1.55 ERA, 55 strikeouts, and 13 saves over 52 1/3 innings. The White Sox named him to their Spring Breakout roster during 2025 spring training. Coffey returned to Charlotte to open the 2025 season and also played with Birmingham and Winston-Salem. He appeared in 44 games between the three teams and pitched to a 4–5 record, a 5.20 ERA, and 75 strikeouts over 55 1/3 innings. In 2026, he played with Charlotte and had a 3–4 record, a 6.44 ERA, and 58 strikeouts over 58 2/3 innings. He elected free agency on November 2.

=== Tampa Bay Rays ===
On November 19, 2026, the Tampa Bay Rays signed Coffey to a minor league contract and assigned him to the Durham Bulls..
