= Taylor Dollard =

Free agent
- Pitcher
- Born: February 17, 1999 (age 27); Sherman Oaks, California, U.S.
- Bats: Right Throws: Right

Taylor Joseph Dollard (born February 17, 1999) is an American professional baseball pitcher who is a free agent.

== Amateur career ==
Dollard attended Crespi Carmelite High School in Encino, Los Angeles, California. As a junior in 2016, he went 2-4 with a 3.38 ERA over 12 appearances. As a senior in 2017, he went 2-0 with a 1.43 ERA and 42 strikeouts over 29 1/3 innings. He went undrafted in the 2017 Major League Baseball draft and enrolled at Cal Poly San Luis Obispo to play college baseball.

Dollard made 19 appearance as a freshman at Cal Poly in 2018 and posted a 2.43 ERA. In 2019, his sophomore year, he made 19 relief appearances and went 5-0 with a 2.89 ERA and 48 strikeouts over 43 2/3 innings. After the 2019 season, Dollard played collegiate summer baseball in the Cape Cod Baseball League for the Yarmouth-Dennis Red Sox. He made four starts in 2020 before the season was cancelled due to the COVID-19 pandemic.

== Professional career ==
Dollard was selected by the Seattle Mariners in the fifth round of the shortened 2020 Major League Baseball draft with the 137th overall selection. He signed for $406,000.

Dollard made his professional debut in 2021 with the Modesto Nuts and was promoted to the Everett AquaSox in June. Over 19 games (18 starts) between the two teams, he went 9–4 with a 5.14 ERA and 133 strikeouts over 105 innings. He pitched for the Arkansas Travelers in 2022. Over 27 starts, he went 16–2 with a 2.25 ERA and 131 strikeouts over 144 innings. He led the minor leagues in wins. He was also awarded the Texas League Pitcher of the Year Award.

Dollard was assigned to the Tacoma Rainiers to begin the 2023 season. Dollard made only three starts for Tacoma, logging a 7.56 ERA across 8 1/3 innings, before he was placed on the injured list with a shoulder impingement on April 26. On June 27, it was announced that Dollard would undergo labrum surgery and miss the remainder of the season. He did not pitch in 2024. In 2025, Dollard pitched with the Arizona Complex League Mariners and Everett, going 3-4 with a 4.54 ERA over 69 1/3 innings. He played the 2026 season with Everett and went 5–9 with a 5.59 ERA and 81 strikeouts over 93 1/3 innings. He elected free agency on November 2.
