= Sam Weatherly =

Free agent
- Pitcher
- Born: May 28, 1999 (age 27); Ann Arbor, Michigan, U.S.
- Bats: Left Throws: Left

Samuel Thomas Weatherly (born May 28, 1999) is an American professional baseball pitcher who is a free agent.

== Amateur career ==
Weatherly grew up in Ann Arbor, Michigan and attended Howell High School. He was named Michigan's Mr. Baseball as a senior after going 6–2 on the mound with a 0.78 earned run average (ERA) and also batting .482. Weatherly was selected in the 27th round of the 2017 Major League Baseball draft by the Toronto Blue Jays, but opted not to sign with the team.

Weatherly played for the Clemson Tigers for three seasons. As a freshman, he made eight appearances with five starts and had an ERA of 6.64. After the season, Weatherly played collegiate summer baseball for the Kalamazoo Growlers of the Northwoods League. Weatherly went 2–0 with a 3.38 ERA in 21 relief appearances in his sophomore season. During the summer of 2019, he played for the Falmouth Commodores of the Cape Cod Baseball League and went 0–1 with a 4.32 ERA and 18 strikeouts over 16 2/3 innings pitched. As a junior, Weatherly had a 0.79 ERA struck out 43 batters in 22 2/3 innings pitched over four starts before the season was cut short due to the coronavirus pandemic.

== Professional career ==
Weatherly was selected in the third round by the Colorado Rockies in the 2020 Major League Baseball draft. He signed with the team on June 24, 2020, for the slot-valued bonus of $755,300.

Weatherly was assigned to the Fresno Grizzlies to make his professional debut in 2021. Over 15 starts for the season, he went 4-6 with a 4.83 ERA and 96 strikeouts over 69 innings pitched. He appeared in only five games in 2022 and missed the entirety of the 2023 season due to injury, including shoulder surgery. Weatherly returned to play in 2024 with Fresno and the Spokane Indians, making forty relief appearances and going 5-1 with a 2.22 ERA. He was assigned to the Hartford Yard Goats to open the 2025 season.

In 2026, he appeared in 38 games (9 starts) with Double-A Hartford Yard Goats he threw 53.2 innings going 2-6 with a 8.72 ERA with 64 strikeouts and one save. He elected free agency on November 2.
