= Tink Hence =

American baseball player (born 2002)

Los Angeles Dodgers
- Pitcher
- Born: August 6, 2002 (age 24); Pine Bluff, Arkansas, U.S.
- Bats: Right Throws: Right
- Stats at Baseball Reference

Markevian "Tink" Hence (born August 6, 2002) is an American professional baseball pitcher in the Los Angeles Dodgers organization.

== Amateur career ==
Hence attended Watson Chapel High School in Pine Bluff, Arkansas, where he played baseball. During his senior year in 2020, he pitched three innings before the season was cancelled due to the COVID-19 pandemic. He was selected by the St. Louis Cardinals with the 63rd overall selection of the 2020 Major League Baseball draft. He signed for $1.12 million, forgoing his commitment to play college baseball at the University of Arkansas.

== Professional career ==
=== St. Louis Cardinals ===
Hence did not play after signing with the Cardinals due to the cancellation of the minor league season. He made his professional debut in 2021 with the rookie league Florida Complex League Cardinals, pitching a total of eight innings for the season while giving up eight earned runs and three walks while striking out 14. He opened the 2022 season in extended spring training before he was assigned to the Palm Beach Cardinals of the Single-A Florida State League in mid-May. On June 15, he pitched three innings of a combined no-hitter versus the Clearwater Threshers. Over 16 starts with Palm Beach, Hence went 0–1 with a 1.38 ERA, 81 strikeouts and 15 walks over 52 1/3 innings. He was selected to play in the Arizona Fall League for the Salt River Rafters after the season. To begin the 2023 season, Hence was assigned to the Peoria Chiefs of the High-A Midwest League. He was selected to represent the Cardinals (alongside Victor Scott II) at the 2023 All-Star Futures Game. In early July, he was promoted to the Springfield Cardinals of the Double-A Texas League. Over 23 starts between the two teams, Hence went 4–6 with a 4.31 ERA and 99 strikeouts over 96 innings.

Hence returned to Springfield for the 2024 season. He was selected to his second consecutive All-Star Futures Game alongside Quinn Mathews. Over twenty starts for Springfield, he compiled a 4–3 record and 2.71 ERA with 109 strikeouts across 79 2/3 innings pitched. He was awarded the Texas League Pitcher of the Year Award. Following the season, the Cardinals added Hence to their 40-man roster to protect him from the Rule 5 draft.

Hence was optioned to Springfield to begin the 2025 season. On March 28, 2025, Hence was placed on the minor league 60-day injured list after suffering a right rib cage strain. He returned to play in May. In July, he was placed back on the injured list with an undisclosed injury. He pitched a total of 21 1/3 innings for the season with a 2.95 ERA and 24 strikeouts with Springfield, Peoria, Palm Beach, and the FCL Cardinals.

Hence was optioned to the Memphis Redbirds of the Triple-A International League to begin the 2026 season. Hence had a 8.64 ERA with nine walks across 8 1/3 innings and the Cardinals reassigned him to the FCL Cardinals on April 30, 2026. He was assigned back to Memphis on June 2. After struggling to a 1–3 record and 6.64 ERA across 19 games for Memphis, Hence was designated for assignment by St. Louis on August 1. He cleared waivers and was sent outright to Memphis on August 6. He elected free agency on November 2.

=== Los Angeles Dodgers ===
Hence signed a minor league contract with the Los Angeles Dodgers in November of 2026.

== Personal life ==
Two of Hence's older brothers, Braelin and Blake, played college baseball at the University of Arkansas at Pine Bluff.
