= Jagger Haynes =

Free agent
- Pitcher
- Born: September 20, 2002 (age 24); Whiteville, North Carolina, U.S.
- Bats: Left Throws: Left

Coleman Jagger Haynes (born September 20, 2002) is an American professional baseball pitcher who is a free agent.

== Amateur career ==
Haynes attended West Columbus High School in Cerro Gordo, North Carolina, where he played baseball.

== Professional career ==
Haynes was selected by the San Diego Padres in the fifth round of the 2020 Major League Baseball draft. He was the youngest pitcher selected in the draft. He signed with the team for $300,000, forgoing his commitment to play college baseball at the University of North Carolina.

Haynes underwent Tommy John surgery after being drafted, and made his professional debut in 2023 with the Single-A Lake Elsinore Storm. He started 11 games and went 0–3 with a 3.91 ERA. Haynes played with the High-A Fort Wayne TinCaps for the 2024 season, starting 22 games and going 2–6 with a 4.64 ERA and 114 strikeouts over 110 2/3 innings. He was assigned to the Double-A San Antonio Missions for the 2025 season. Over 26 games (25 starts), Haynes went 3–4 with a 4.11 ERA and 101 strikeouts over 103 innings pitched. Haynes returned to San Antonio to begin the 2026 season with whom he started 18 games and had a 3–3 record, a 4.37 ERA, and 85 strikeouts over 94 2/3 innings before he was promoted to the Triple-A El Paso Chihuahuas in July. Across ten games with El Paso, he had a 0–5 record, a 5.80 ERA, and 31 strikeouts over 40 1/3 innings. He elected free agency on November 2.
