= Ed Howard (baseball) =

American baseball player (born 2002)

Free agent
- Shortstop
- Born: January 28, 2002 (age 24); Evergreen Park, Illinois, U.S.
- Bats: Right Throws: Right
- Stats at Baseball Reference

Edward Vernell Howard IV (born January 28, 2002) is an American professional baseball shortstop who is a free agent. Howard was selected 16th overall by the Chicago Cubs in the 2020 Major League Baseball draft.

== Amateur career ==
Howard grew up in Lynwood, Illinois, and was a member of the Jackie Robinson West Little League team that competed in the 2014 Little League World Series championship game. He attended Mount Carmel High School in Chicago, Illinois, where he was a shortstop on the baseball team and played basketball before giving up the sport to focus on baseball. He was named first team All-Chicago Catholic League (CCL) as a sophomore after batting .380. As a junior, he batted .419 with three home runs, 12 doubles and 29 RBIs and was named first team All-CCL, first team All-Chicago Southland and first team Class 4A All-State. Howard played in the Under Armour All-American Game, the Perfect Game All-America Game and the inaugural MLB High School All-Star Game after his junior season. Howard entered his senior year as a top prospect for the 2020 Major League Baseball draft. As a high school sophomore, Howard committed to play college baseball at the University of Oklahoma, and signed with the Sooners early in his senior year.

== Professional career ==
Howard was selected by the Chicago Cubs with the 16th overall selection in the 2020 Major League Baseball draft. Howard signed with the Cubs for a $3.745 million bonus. He did not appear for the organization due to the cancellation of the minor league season because of the COVID-19 pandemic.

Howard made his professional debut in 2021 with the Myrtle Beach Pelicans of the Low-A East. Over eighty games, he slashed .225/.277/.315 with four home runs, 31 RBI, and seven stolen bases. He missed over a month during the season due to a hamstring injury. Howard opened the 2022 season with the South Bend Cubs of the High-A Midwest League. He suffered a season-ending hip injury in May. Howard batted .244 with one home run, 11 RBI and three stolen bases in 23 games.

Howard's 2023 campaign was delayed as a result of the hip injury he suffered the previous year; in 45 games for South Bend, he batted .199/.239/.244 with two home runs, 14 RBI, and four stolen bases. He split the 2024 season between South Bend and the Triple-A Iowa Cubs. In 112 appearances for the two affiliates, Howard slashed a cumulative .225/.281/.298 with two home runs, 27 RBI, and eight stolen bases. He played only 21 games in 2025 due to injury. In 2026, he played 52 games between the Double-A Knoxville Smokies and Iowa, and hit .168 with two home runs. On August 29, 2026, Howard was released by the Cubs.
