= Burl Carraway =

American baseball player (born 1999)

Free agent
- Pitcher
- Born: May 28, 1999 (age 27); College Station, Texas, U.S.
- Bats: Left Throws: Left

Ausley Burl Carraway (born May 27, 1999) is an American professional baseball pitcher who is a free agent.

== Amateur career ==
Carraway attended A&M Consolidated High School in College Station, Texas, and played college baseball at Dallas Baptist University. As a junior in 2019, he went 4–2 with a 2.81 ERA and six saves over 41 2/3 innings. That summer, he played for the USA Baseball Collegiate National Team, as well as playing collegiate summer baseball with the Chatham Anglers of the Cape Cod Baseball League. He pitched 9 1/3 innings in 2020 before the season was cancelled due to the COVID-19 pandemic.

== Professional career ==
Carraway was selected by the Chicago Cubs in the second round with the 51st overall selection of the 2020 Major League Baseball draft. He signed for $1.1 million.

Carraway made his professional debut in 2021 with the South Bend Cubs and was promoted to the Tennessee Smokies at the end of the season. Over 35 2/3 relief innings pitched between the two clubs, he went 3–3 with a 5.30 ERA and 54 strikeouts. He opened the 2022 season with Tennessee. Due to injury, he pitched only ten innings in which he gave up 12 runs and 24 walks.

Carraway missed the entirety of the 2023 and 2024 seasons due to injury. In 2025, Carraway returned to action with the rookie-level Arizona Complex League Cubs and South Bend; in 10 appearances for the two affiliates, he struggled to a 9.72 ERA with 11 strikeouts across 8 1/3 innings pitched. Carraway was released by the Cubs organization on December 11, 2025.
