= Omar Narváez (baseball) =

Venezuelan baseball player (born 1992)

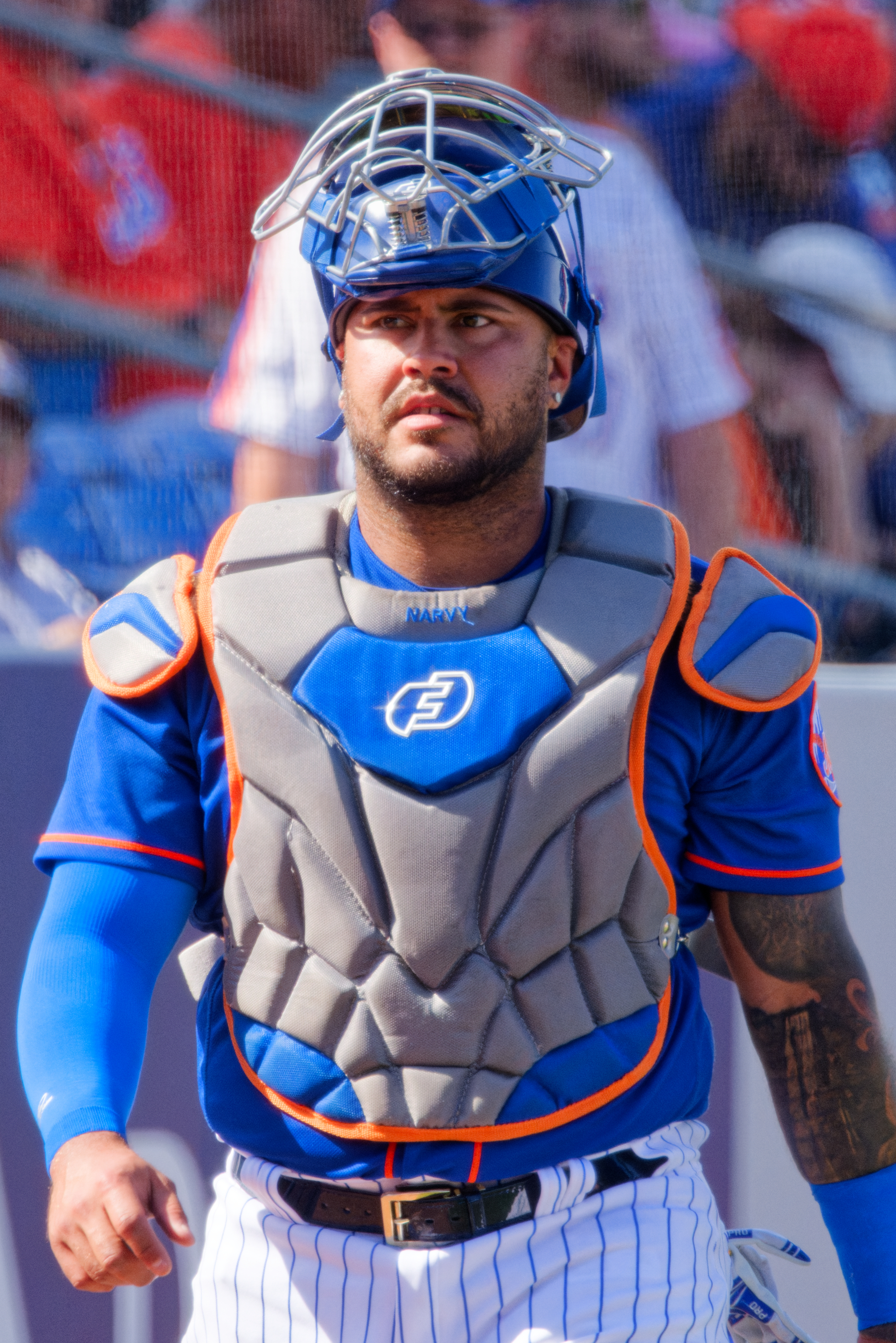
- Narváez with the Mets in 2023

Sultanes de Monterrey – No. 38
- Catcher
- Born: February 10, 1992 (age 34); Maracay, Aragua, Venezuela
- Bats: Left Throws: Right

MLB debut
- July 17, 2016, for the Chicago White Sox

MLB statistics (through 2025 season)
- Batting average: .252
- Home runs: 53
- Runs batted in: 206
- Stats at Baseball Reference

Teams
- Chicago White Sox (2016–2018); Seattle Mariners (2019); Milwaukee Brewers (2020–2022); New York Mets (2023–2024); Chicago White Sox (2025)

Career highlights and awards
- All-Star (2021)

Omar David Narváez (born February 10, 1992) is a Venezuelan professional baseball catcher for the Sultanes de Monterrey of the Mexican League. He has previously played in Major League Baseball (MLB) for the Chicago White Sox, Seattle Mariners, Milwaukee Brewers, and New York Mets. He made his MLB debut in 2016 and was an All-Star in 2021.

== Career ==
=== Tampa Bay Rays ===
At the age of 16, on July 4, 2008, Narváez signed a contract with the Tampa Bay Rays organization. In 2009, he made his professional debut with the VSL Rays of the Venezuelan Summer League. In 47 games, Narváez posted a .315 batting average and 27 runs batted in (RBI). He remained with the VSL Rays in 2010, batting .308 in 46 games, with one homer and 20 RBI. Narváez also earned 27 walks compared to only 11 strikeouts.

Narváez joined the GCL Rays of the Gulf Coast League for the 2011 season. In 47 games, his average dipped to .221 and he drove in 15 runs. His batting average climbed back to .305 in 2012, when Narváez joined the Princeton Rays of the Appalachian League. In 43 games, he tallied one homer and 16 RBI.

In 2013, Narváez was promoted above Rookie–level for the first time in his career. He joined the Hudson Valley Renegades of the Single–A New York–Penn League. He batted .267 in 39 games, driving in 13 runs.

=== Chicago White Sox ===
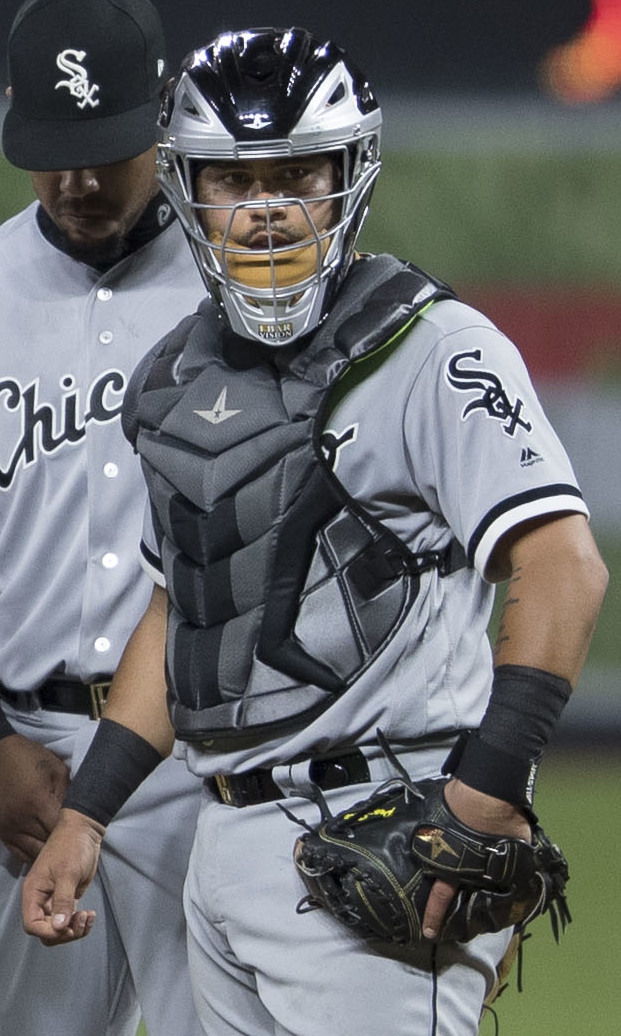
Narváez with the White Sox in 2017

On December 12, the Chicago White Sox selected Narváez from the Rays in the minor league phase of the Rule 5 draft.

Narváez split the 2014 season between the Kannapolis Intimidators and the Winston-Salem Dash. With Kannapolis, a member of the mid Single–A South Atlantic League, Narváez saw action in 38 games. He batted .291 and drove in 20 runs. Narváez also appeared in 47 games with Winston-Salem of the high Single–A Carolina League, where he batted .279, with 2 homers, 16 RBI, 27 walks, and 21 strikeouts. Narváez played in a total of 85 games in 2014, well surpassing his prior career high of 47 appearances (in 2009 and 2011).

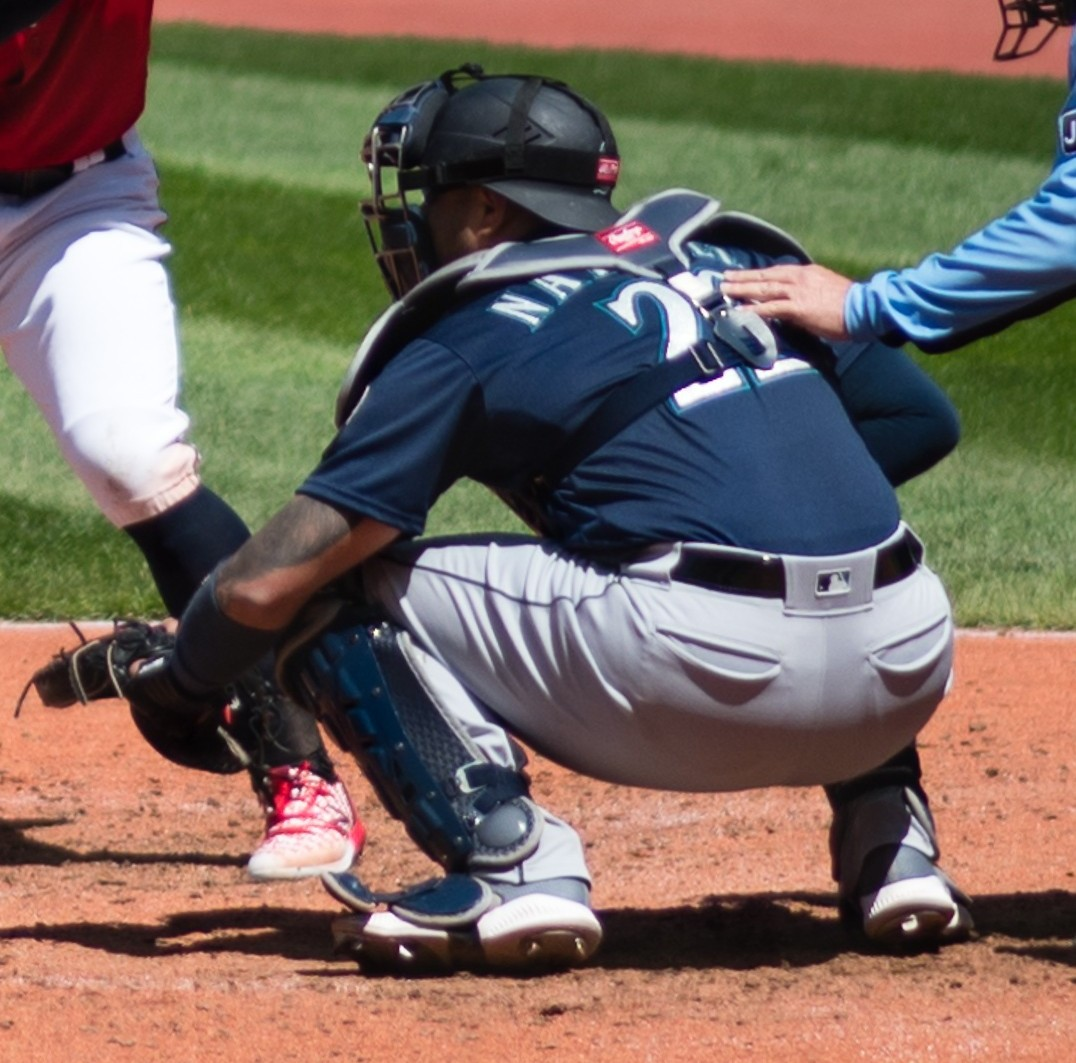
Narváez with the Seattle Mariners in 2019

Narváez remained with Winston-Salem for the 2015 season. He saw action in 98 games and posted a .274 average, with one home run, 27 RBI, 40 walks, and 31 strikeouts. He also appeared in 13 games for Bravos de Margarita of the Venezuelan Winter League. Narváez spent the 2016 season with a pair of Chicago's minor league affiliates, the AA Birmingham Barons and the AAA Charlotte Knights, as well as the parent club. He batted .222 in 13 games with Birmingham and .245 in 41 appearances for Charlotte.

Narváez was called up to the major leagues for the first time on July 6, 2016. He made his MLB debut on July 17 against the Los Angeles Angels, and doubled off pitcher Jered Weaver in his first at-bat. Narváez hit his first MLB home run, a solo shot off Minnesota Twins reliever Pat Dean, on September 30, his father's birthday. Overall, Narváez played in 34 games for the White Sox and posted a .267 batting average with one home run and 10 RBIs.

=== Seattle Mariners ===
On November 30, 2018, the White Sox traded Narvaez to the Seattle Mariners in exchange for Alex Colomé. He made 132 appearances for the Mariners in 2019, batted .278/.353/.460 with 22 home runs and 55 RBI.

=== Milwaukee Brewers ===
On December 5, 2019, the Mariners traded Narváez to the Milwaukee Brewers in exchange for Adam Hill and a competitive balance round B draft pick in the 2020 MLB draft. In 2020, Narváez hit .176/.294/.269 with two home runs and 10 RBI in 40 games for Milwaukee. Narváez was selected to the 2021 MLB All-Star Game. In 123 games for the Brewers in 2021, he batted .266/.342/.402 with 11 home runs and 49 RBI.

=== New York Mets ===
On December 22, 2022, Narváez signed a one-year contract with the New York Mets including a player option for 2024 worth $15 million. On April 6, 2023, Narváez was diagnosed with a medium-to-high grade strain of his left calf, and given a recovery timetable of 8–9 weeks. He returned from the 60-day injured list on June 5, and assumed the backup role that was vacated when Tomás Nido was designated for assignment. Narváez finished the year having made 49 appearances for the Mets, with a slash line of .211/.283/.297 with two home runs and 7 RBI.

On May 26, 2024, Narváez hit a walk-off single against the San Francisco Giants, his first and only hit at Citi Field that season. He played in 28 games for New York in 2024, batting .154/.191/.185 with no home runs and 5 RBI. On May 31, Narváez was designated for assignment by the Mets following the acquisition of Luis Torrens. He was then released by the team on June 5.

=== Houston Astros ===
On June 26, 2024, Narváez signed a minor league contract with the Houston Astros. In 42 games for the Triple-A Sugar Land Space Cowboys, he batted .196/.325/.304 with three home runs and 20 RBI. Narváez elected free agency following the season on November 4.

=== Chicago White Sox (second stint) ===
On January 10, 2025, Narváez signed a minor league contract with the Chicago White Sox. He was released by the White Sox prior to the start of the season on March 24. On April 1, Narváez re-signed with the White Sox on a new minor league contract. In 3 games for the Double-A Birmingham Barons, he went 2-for-8 (.250) with 2 RBI. On April 10, the White Sox selected Narváez's contract, adding him to their active roster. In four games for Chicago, he went 2-for-7 (.286) with 3 RBI and two walks. Narváez was designated for assignment following the promotion of Edgar Quero on April 17. He elected free agency after clearing waivers on April 21. On April 23, Narváez re-signed with the White Sox organization on a minor league contract. On May 20, Narváez was released by the White Sox.

=== Houston Astros (second stint) ===
On June 5, 2025, Narváez signed a minor league contract with the Houston Astros. In 27 appearances for the Triple-A Sugar Land Space Cowboys, he batted .258/.402/.333 with one home run and 11 RBI. Narváez was released by the Astros organization on August 3.

=== Texas Rangers ===
On August 10, 2025, Narváez signed a minor league contract with the Texas Rangers organization. He made 30 appearances for the Triple-A Round Rock Express, slashing .271/.383/.375 with two home runs and 17 RBI. Narváez elected free agency following the season on November 6.

=== Sultanes de Monterrey ===
On March 10, 2026, Narváez signed with the Sultanes de Monterrey of the Mexican League.

== Personal life ==
Narváez's cousin, Carlos, plays in MLB for the Baltimore Orioles.

== See also ==
- List of Major League Baseball players from Venezuela
- Rule 5 draft results
