= Jayden Struble =

American ice hockey player (born 2001)

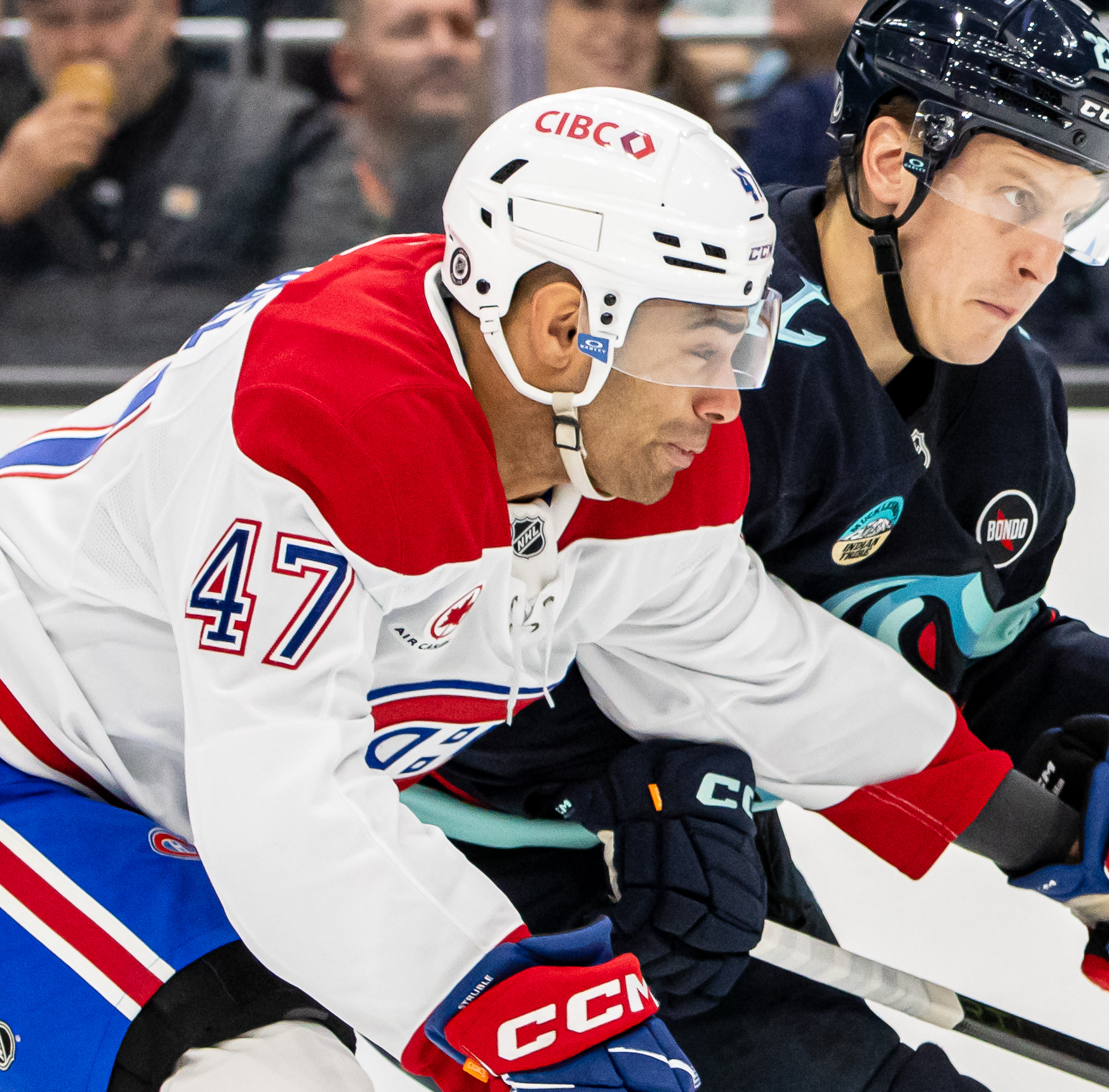
- Struble with the Montreal Canadiens in 2025
- Born: September 8, 2001 (age 25) Cumberland, Rhode Island, U.S.
- Height: 6 ft 0 in (183 cm)
- Weight: 207 lb (94 kg; 14 st 11 lb)
- Position: Defense
- Shoots: Left
- NHL team Former teams: Nashville Predators; Montreal Canadiens
- NHL draft: 46th overall, 2019; Montreal Canadiens
- Playing career: 2023–present

Jayden Struble (born September 8, 2001) is an American professional ice hockey player who is a defenseman for the Nashville Predators of the National Hockey League (NHL). He was selected in the second round, 46th overall, by the Montreal Canadiens in the 2019 NHL entry draft.

== Playing career ==
=== Early years ===
As a youth, Struble played in the 2014 iteration of the Quebec International Pee-Wee Hockey Tournament with a minor ice hockey team from Long Island, New York.

=== Collegiate ===
After a successful high school hockey career at St. Sebastian's School, Struble played collegiately with the Boston-based Northeastern Huskies of the National Collegiate Athletic Association (NCAA) for four years beginning in the 2019–20 NCAA season. While with the program, he played on the second power play unit and was used in all on-ice situations.

=== Professional ===
Selected by the Montreal Canadiens in the second round (46th overall) of the 2019 NHL entry draft, Struble signed a two-year entry-level contract with the team following his senior year with Northeastern on March 15, 2023.

After beginning the 2023–24 season with the Canadiens' American Hockey League (AHL) affiliate, the Laval Rocket, Struble was assessed a three-game suspension by league officials for leaving the bench during a game versus the Manitoba Moose on November 12, 2023. A week later, he was recalled by Montreal after injuries to defenseman Arber Xhekaj and forward Rafaël Harvey-Pinard, and made his NHL debut on November 22 against the Anaheim Ducks. Struble recorded his first NHL point, an assist, in his second NHL game on November 24 versus the San Jose Sharks, whereas his first NHL goal came on December 9 against Devon Levi in a 3–2 shootout win over the Buffalo Sabres. After the Canadiens failed to qualify for the 2024 Stanley Cup playoffs, he was one of four players reassigned to Laval to end the season. Collectively, Struble finished his rookie NHL campaign with three goals and seven assists across 56 games played.

Spending the majority of the 2024–25 season with Montreal, Struble was reassigned to the Rocket on January 24, 2025, for conditioning purposes. Days later, he was recalled by the Canadiens on January 29. On March 25, Struble skated in his 100th career NHL game on the road versus the St. Louis Blues.

Entering the off-season as a restricted free agent, Struble was extended a qualifying offer by the Canadiens on June 30, 2025. Thereafter, he elected for salary arbitration on July 5, and ultimately agreed to a two-year contract extension with the team on July 28.

On October 9, 2026, Struble was traded to the Nashville Predators in exchange for a 2027 second-round pick.

== Personal life ==
At age 12, Struble played in the 2014 Little League Baseball World Series, representing Cumberland American Little League and the New England region.

== Career statistics ==
			Regular season					Playoffs
Season	Team	League	GP	G	A	Pts	PIM	GP	G	A	Pts	PIM
2017–18	Saint Sebastian's School	USHS	30	12	18	30	—	—	—	—	—	—
2018–19	Saint Sebastian's School	USHS	28	10	30	40	—	—	—	—	—	—
2019–20	Northeastern University	HE	21	3	7	10	36	—	—	—	—	—
2020–21	Northeastern University	HE	18	2	10	12	33	—	—	—	—	—
2021–22	Northeastern University	HE	34	3	11	14	65	—	—	—	—	—
2022–23	Northeastern University	HE	31	1	11	12	56	—	—	—	—	—
2022–23	Laval Rocket	AHL	9	0	1	1	4	2	0	0	0	0
2023–24	Laval Rocket	AHL	13	1	6	7	29	—	—	—	—	—
2023–24	Montreal Canadiens	NHL	56	3	7	10	57	—	—	—	—	—
2024–25	Montreal Canadiens	NHL	56	2	11	13	52	2	0	0	0	0
2024–25	Laval Rocket	AHL	2	0	0	0	4	—	—	—	—	—
2025–26	Montreal Canadiens	NHL	59	2	10	12	58	12	0	0	0	14
2026–27	Montreal Canadiens	NHL	3	0	0	0	0	—	—	—	—	—
NHL totals			174	7	28	35	167	14	0	0	0	14
