= Eugene Jarosewich =

Eugene (Gene) Jarosewich (1926–2007) was a chemist in the department of mineral sciences at the Smithsonian Institution. Jarosewich was known worldwide for wet chemical analyses of meteorites. Working with specimens from the National Mineral Collection, Gene and his co-workers also developed a set of commonly used standards for electron microprobe analyses.

The mineral Jarosewichite and asteroid 4320 Jarosewich are named in his honor.
