= Jarosewichite =

Mineral

General
- Category: Arsenate mineral
- Formula: Mn^{2+}_{3}Mn^{3+}(AsO_{4})(OH)_{6}
- IMA symbol: Jrw
- Strunz classification: 8.BE.70
- Crystal system: Orthorhombic
- Crystal class: Disphenoidal (222); H-M symbol: (2 2 2)
- Space group: Cmmm or C222
- Unit cell: a = 6.56, b = 25.2 c = 10 [Å]; Z = 8

Identification
- Color: Very dark red
- Crystal habit: Prismatic crystals occurring typically as divergent sprays
- Cleavage: None observed
- Fracture: Irregular – uneven
- Tenacity: Brittle
- Mohs scale hardness: 4
- Luster: Subvitreous
- Streak: Reddish orange
- Diaphaneity: Translucent through thin edges
- Specific gravity: 3.66
- Optical properties: Biaxial (−)
- Refractive index: n_{α} = 1.780 n_{β} = 1.795 n_{γ} = 1.805
- Birefringence: δ = 0.025
- Pleochroism: Weak
- 2V angle: Measured: 78°

Jarosewichite is a rare manganese arsenate mineral with formula: Mn^{2+}_{3}Mn^{3+}(AsO_{4})(OH)_{6}. It was first described in Franklin, New Jersey which is its only reported occurrence. Its chemical composition and structure are similar to chlorophoenicite. This mineral is orthorhombic with 2/m2/m2/m point group. Its crystals are prismatic or barrel-shaped. The color of jarosewichite is dark red to black. It has subvitreous luster of fracture surfaces and reddish-orange streak. This mineral occurs with flinkite, franklinite, andradite and cahnite.

== Composition ==
The chemical composition of jarosewichite was obtained in 1982. These data were obtained by electron microprobe analysis with a voltage of 15 kV and a current of 0.025μA. Manganite(Mn), synthetic olivenite(As), synthetic ZnO(Zn), and hornblende(Ca, Mg, Fe) are used as standards for the analysis. Water percentage of the sample cannot be measured directly because of lacking large size of sample. The composition of jarosewichite is as follows:

- As_{2}O_{5} 24.0
- Mn_{2}O_{3} 17.7
- FeO 0.4
- MnO 42.3
- ZnO 1.2
- MgO 2.1
- CaO 0.2
- H_{2}O 12.1
- Total 100.0

The final calculation formula of unit cell contents is : [Mn^{3+}_{1.00}(Mn^{2+}_{2.74}Mg_{0.24}Fe_{0.03}Ca_{0.02}Zn_{0.07})_{Σ3.10}(AsO_{4})_{0.95}(OH)_{6.35}], with Z=8 This result is very similar to the theoretical formula, which is Mn^{2+}_{3}Mn^{3+}(AsO_{4})(OH)_{6}. The theoretical weight percent of oxides are: Mn_{2}O_{3}=17.14, MnO=46.20, As_{2}O_{5}=24.95 and H_{2}O=11.71, and the sum is 100.

== Structure ==
Jarosewichite is orthorhombic crystal, and the space group is C2/m2/m2/m. The three axes are a=6.56(3), b=25.20(10) and c=10.00(5). These results are from the d-values measurement of a jarosewichite powder, all reflection with odd h or k are very weak, so they are not used to determine the powder pattern.

== Physical properties ==
The color of jarosewichite in nature is very dark red, sometimes black. It has subvitreous luster of fracture surfaces and reddish orange streak. The Mohs scale of hardness is almost 4. The density is 3.66(4) g/cm^{3}, which is determined by heavy liquid techniques. This value is very similar to the calculated result of 3.70 g/cm^{3}.

In optical aspect, jarosewichite is biaxial and its refractive indices are α=1.780(5),β=1.795(5) and γ=1.805(5). The calculated value of 2V is 78°. The determination of refractive index and 2V has high standard errors, because the refractive index can be influenced by liquids and the crystal size is very small.

== Geologic occurrence ==
Jarosewichite was first found by David K. Cook in Franklin, Sussex County, New Jersey. It always occurs with flinkite, franklinite, andradite and cahnite. The mine specimen has a stratified crust of vugs from metamorphosed zinc orebody. There are some small crystals of hausmannite, allactite and cahnite on the vugs, which formed with jarosewichite.

== Biographic sketch ==
Jarosewichite was named in honor of Eugene Jarosewich (1926–2007), a chemist in the Department of Mineral Sciences of Smithsonian Institution, Washington, D.C., US. Gene was known in the instrumental analysis of rocks and minerals, especially in wet chemical analyses of meteorites. In the 1970s, Gene and his co-workers also established a set of analytical standards of electron microprobe. The asteroid 4320 Jarosewich (1981 EJ17) was also named after Eugene Jarosewich.

== Literature survey ==
This mineral was first mentioned by Cook's "Recent work on the minerals of Franklin and Sterling Hill, New Jersey"(1973). But Cook did not recognize that it was a new mineral, he described it as carminite. The first article described it as jarosewichite is Dunn's "Jarosewichite and a related phase: basic manganese arsenates of the chlorophoenicite group from Franklin, New Jersey"(1982). This article is also the most highly cited paper in Web of Science with five citations and it provided the accurate composition of jarosewichite. The structure of jarosewichite is very similar to chlorophoenicite, so Moore's "The crystal structure of chlorophoenicite "(1968) is also helpful to this research. Anthony and other 3 writer's "Handbook of Mineralogy"(2001) provided comprehensive basic information of jarosewichite, but their research is not deep.
