= R. J. Dabovich =

R.J. Dabovich

Free agent
- Pitcher
- Born: January 11, 1999 (age 27); Pueblo, Colorado, U.S.
- Bats: Right Throws: Right

Roderick John Dabovich (born January 11, 1999) is an American professional baseball pitcher who is a free agent.

== Amateur career ==
Dabovich attended Pueblo West High School in Pueblo West, Colorado. He had a career 0.80 earned run average (ERA). He then enrolled at Central Arizona College where he played college baseball, posting a 9–3 record and 1.81 ERA over 69 2/3 innings as a freshman in 2018. The Kansas City Royals selected him in the 18th round of the 2018 MLB draft, but he did not sign. Instead, he transferred to Arizona State University. In 2019, his first year at Arizona State, he pitched 53 innings in which he went 7–1 with a 4.75 ERA and 47 strikeouts. After the 2019 season, he played collegiate summer baseball with the Chatham Anglers of the Cape Cod Baseball League. He entered the 2020 season expected to be the team's closer, but pitched only 11 2/3 innings with four saves before the season was cancelled due to the COVID-19 pandemic.

== Professional career ==
Dabovich was selected by the San Francisco Giants in the fourth round with the 114th overall selection of the 2020 MLB draft. He signed for $200,000. He did not play a minor league game in 2020 due to the cancellation of the season. He began the 2021 season with the Eugene Emeralds of the High-A West and was promoted to the Richmond Flying Squirrels of the Double-A Northeast in mid-June. He missed most of August after going on the injured list with back tightness and returned to play in early September. Over 32 1/3 innings pitched in relief between the two clubs, Dabovich went 1–1 with a 2.78 ERA and 62 strikeouts. He played in the Arizona Fall League for the Scottsdale Scorpions after the season where he went 1–0 and was named to the Fall Stars Game.

Dabovich returned to Richmond to begin the 2022 season. In late June, he was promoted to the Sacramento River Cats. Over 45 appearances (one start) between the two teams, he went 6–1 with a 3.51 ERA and 69 strikeouts over 51 1/3 innings. To open the 2023 season, Dabovich returned to Sacramento. He appeared in four games before undergoing season-ending hip surgery. Dabovich was assigned to Sacramento to open the 2024 season, but again appeared in only four games for the season. In 2025, he pitched 9 1/3 innings with 19 strikeouts between San Jose, Richmond, and the Arizona Complex League Giants. He elected free agency on November 2, 2026.
