= George Darrow (baseball) =

American baseball player (1903-1983)

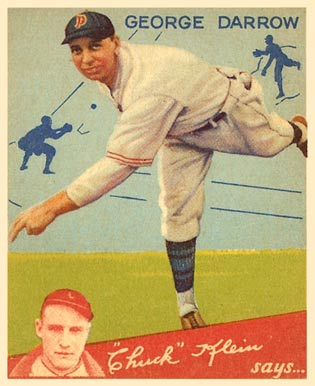
- Pitcher
- Born: July 12, 1903; Beloit, Kansas, U.S.
- Died: March 24, 1983 (aged 79); Sun City, Arizona, U.S.
- Batted: Left Threw: Left

MLB debut
- April 22, 1934, for the Philadelphia Phillies

Last MLB appearance
- July 2, 1934, for the Philadelphia Phillies

MLB statistics
- Win–loss record: 2–6
- Earned run average: 5.51
- Strikeouts: 14
- Stats at Baseball Reference

Teams
- Philadelphia Phillies (1934)

George Oliver Darrow (July 7, 1903 – March 24, 1983) was an American professional baseball player. He was a left-handed pitcher for one season (1934) with the Philadelphia Phillies. For his career, he compiled a 2–6 record, with a 5.51 earned run average, and 14 strikeouts in 49 innings pitched.

An alumnus of Washburn University, he was born in Beloit, Kansas, and died in Sun City, Arizona, at the age of 79.
