= Disqualification of Jackie Robinson West Little League from the 2014 Little League World Series =

Disqualification of baseball team

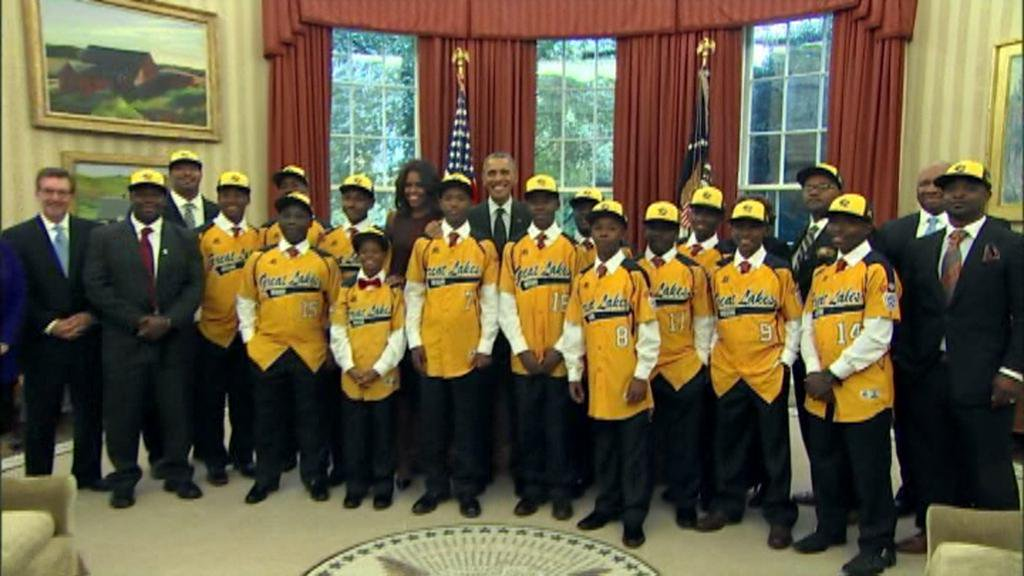
Members of the Jackie Robinson West Little League meeting President Barack Obama at the White House in fall of 2014, prior to their accomplishments being vacated.

The Jackie Robinson West Little League, or JRW, based in Washington Heights, Chicago, Illinois, United States, competed in the 2014 Little League World Series in South Williamsport, Pennsylvania. The team was very successful, winning the U.S. bracket of the tournament, before ultimately losing the championship game to a team from South Korea. Following the tournament, Little League Baseball was tipped that JRW was using ineligible players during their run to Williamsport. This led to a thorough investigation, which ultimately resulted in Little League Baseball stripping JRW of all its 2014 accomplishments on February 11, 2015.

== Background ==
In 1999, Little League Baseball launched its "Urban Initiative," which led to the launch of inner city Little League programs across the United States, including the Jackie Robinson West Little League. Jackie Robinson West (JRW) was the second Little League formed from the Urban Initiative to make it all the way to the Little League World Series. The other was the 2002 Harlem Little League team from Harlem, New York City.

The 2014 Little League World Series was filled with many other notable storylines aside from JRW being the first all-black team to compete in the tournament in several decades. This was the first Little League World Series to feature a team from the state of Nevada, being represented by Las Vegas-based Mountain View Little League (which became the U.S. champion by default after JRW was stripped of its title). This Little League World Series also saw the appearance of Mo'ne Davis, the first female pitcher to win a game in Williamsport. In contrast to Jackie Robinson West Little League, Taney Little League (where Mo'ne Davis played in Philadelphia, Pennsylvania) was able to draw players from 52 separate zip codes in the greater Philadelphia area whereas the official Jackie Robinson West Little League boundaries covered roughly 10 zip codes.

== Initial investigation ==
The first warning signs that JRW was playing with ineligible players were noticed by Chris Janes, a coach and vice president with Evergreen Park Athletic Association Little League, who witnessed his team lose to JRW with the score of 43-2 during the Chicago City Little League tournament. According to Janes, he witnessed some of the players being toasted by communities outside of the team's district boundaries and, in some instances, outside of Chicago itself. After doing some personal investigating, Janes discovered that four or five of the players lived outside of the team's district boundaries – "manipulating, bending and blatantly breaking the rules for the sole purpose of winning at all costs." By that point, JRW had defeated a team from New Albany, Indiana, to win the Great Lakes Regional tournament and had advanced to Williamsport.

Three months later, reports emerged that Little League was beginning their investigation, which was completed in the same month. The officials concluded based on the results of this investigation that Team Manager Darold Butler, Illinois District 4 Administrator Michael Kelley, Team President Anne Haley, and Team Treasurer Bill Haley were guilty of conspiring to recruit players from outside their district. They covered their tracks by persuading officials in other leagues to alter the boundaries, something that the players and their parents allege that they were not informed of.

== Little League’s investigation and outcome ==
Following the completion of the 2014 Little League World Series, which saw Seoul Little League from Seoul, South Korea, defeat JRW 8–4 in the championship game, Little League Baseball launched an investigation into the actions of JRW officials prior to the start of the tournament. Little League initially saw no documentations suggesting that any of the players on the 2014 JRW team lived outside of the team's district boundaries. This led to Little League initially closing the investigation in December 2014.

Other officials from neighboring Little League organizations came forward after the investigation was initially closed, saying that they had not wanted to upend the team's championship season. After top Little League officials interviewed the new parties in January 2015, they discovered JRW used a falsified district map which annexed three neighboring leagues into its district area. This map was backdated and submitted to Little League officials without the permission of the leagues that were added into JRW's district area. When JRW officials and Michael Kelley, the administrator for Illinois Little League District 4, which oversees JRW and several other Chicago leagues, tried to get all the neighboring leagues to approve this map, they refused.

Because of these findings, Little League Baseball announced on February 11, 2015, that it would vacate JRW's accomplishments during the 2014 Little League World Series, including the team's United States Championship and Great Lakes Regional Championship, among all others. Little League also announced that the team's manager, Darold Butler, had been suspended, and that JRW would be on probation until new management could be found to run the league. Little League also removed Michael Kelley from his role as administrator for Illinois Little League District 4.

== Aftermath ==
Following the decision by Little League Baseball to vacate all of JRW's accomplishments, all the team's wins for that year's tournament were forfeited which, according to Little League's rules, goes down as a 6–0 win for the forfeiting team's opponent.

Also, by default,

- The United States championship went to the team that was defeated by JRW in the U.S. championship game: Mountain Ridge Little League from Las Vegas, Nevada.
- The Great Lakes Regional championship went to the team that JRW defeated in the Great Lakes Regional final: New Albany Little League from New Albany, Indiana. All the members of the New Albany team were also invited by Little League to travel to the 2015 Little League World Series since they were effectively denied that opportunity by JRW's actions the previous year.

In February 2016, the families of thirteen of the 2014 JRW players attempted to sue Little League Baseball, Chris Janes, ESPN, and ESPN personality Stephen A. Smith. They alleged that Little League Baseball and JRW officials had deliberately obfuscated details about the players' eligibility to "reap the benefits of notoriety and media attention", did not grant due process, that Smith made defamatory remarks on the ESPN program First Take that "directly accused the JRW parents of perpetrating a fraud against the Little League", and that Janes had violated their right to privacy by using license plates to identify the players' residencies. A judge ruled that Smith's comments were a personal opinion protected by the First Amendment, and removed both ESPN and Smith from the lawsuit in June 2017.

In September 2016, Janes filed a lawsuit in U.S. District Court against Little League International, alleging that officials had knowingly covered up JRW's wrongdoing. After he filed his initial claim with Little League International, it was stated on December 16, 2016, that Janes' claim had no merit. The lawsuit stated, "Subsequently, Janes and his family were subjected to public humiliation, death threats and fear for their lives." Janes alleges intentional and negligent infliction of emotional distress. He is seeking more than $75,000 in damages. A spokesman for Little League did not respond to request for comment.

As of April 2018, the remainder of the lawsuit remains pending.

The New Albany Little League returned to the Great Lakes Regional championship game in 2018, losing again to a team from Grosse Pointe, Michigan, by a score of 13–0. A few days after their defeat, head officials of New Albany Little League asked Little League Central District to look into the residency of players on the Michigan team, fearing that they had been defeated the same way that JRW defeated them four years prior. No wrongdoings of any kind were discovered.

In April 2021, all claims against the team's volunteer coaches, who had been sued for fraud by Little League for their alleged roles in the eligibility scheme, were dismissed after the coaches filed a motion for summary judgment. A separate suit, brought by the players against Little League Baseball, Inc., Jackie Robinson West Little League, Inc., and its administrators, was settled a week later. The players did not sue the coaches, and refused to sign a statement they saw as implying blame on the coaches. Court documents showed that the players and volunteer coaches had no knowledge of cheating, although other adults involved with the program did.

== Innovation ==
As a result of the Jackie Robinson West Little League disqualification in 2015, an area for improvement with regards to how each of the 7,500+ league boundaries were stored, cataloged and maintained was exposed. At the time of the disqualification, official paper copies of league boundaries were stored in file cabinets that resided in each of the 5 regional offices - San Bernardino, CA; Warner Robbins, GA; Bristol, CT; Indianapolis, IN; Waco, TX;. Also, at the same time, volunteers from a district in the Seattle area had been building an unofficial centralized location to store, maintain and publish league boundaries and provide additional tools to assist league and district volunteers as a free service to any league or district that wanted to leverage the technology, FindMyLeague.com. Thanks to the web archive, FindMyLeague.com has been preserved at its exact state prior to the beginning of the 2014 Little League world series on July 29, 2014, and can be found here: https://web.archive.org/web/20140729040540/http://www.findmyleague.com/

FindMyLeague.com had been in development since 2008 and launched in 2011 with boundaries from 37 leagues in Washington State, 14 leagues from Oregon and 19 leagues from California. At the time of the Jackie Robinson West disqualification in 2015, FindMyLeague.com had roughly half of the 7,500+ leagues mapped, stored and published including a number of districts from Canada, freely available to anyone. Neither Jackie Robinson West Little League, nor Illinois District 4 Little League chose to use the optional FindMyLeague.com services at this time. Even before the disqualification, Little League would frequently consult with the volunteers that operated FindMyLeague.com for data and analysis of boundaries that Little League did not have readily available access to or were unable to calculate. FindMyLeague.com was even cited in an Arizona county GIS reference as the source of their original data.

After the Jackie Robinson West disqualification, Bonzi Technology, a Software as a Service (SaaS) company from Portland, Oregon, in 2015 created the first official digital boundary system for Little League using the FindMyLeague.com data, technology and expertise to provide the first contracted digital boundary system for Little League. In 2017 after Bonzi was acquired by Blue Star Sports (now Stack Sports), the management and operation of the digital boundary system was transferred from Stack Sports to Blue Sombrero, a subsidiary of Dick's Sporting goods. In August 2019, Stack Sports acquired Blue Sombrero from Dick's Sporting Goods and later in November 2019 launched Sports Connect who currently operates the website https://PlayLittleLeague.org which currently serves as the official digital boundary mapping system and marketing website for Little League and is referenced in all major broadcasts on ESPN. Major League Baseball also operates a derivative at https://PlayBall.org.

== See also ==
- Danny Almonte, an ineligible participant of the 2001 Little League World Series
- Cheating in baseball
