= Cahnite =

Mineral

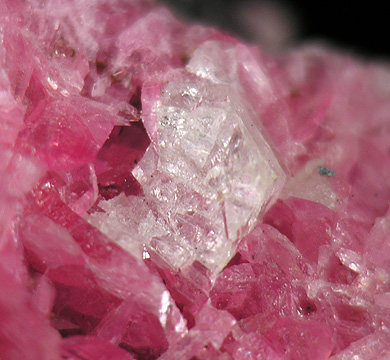
- Cahnite on rhodonite

General
- Category: Borate minerals
- Formula: Ca_{2}B[AsO_{4}](OH)_{4}
- IMA symbol: Cah
- Strunz classification: 6.AC.70
- Crystal system: Tetragonal
- Crystal class: Disphenoidal (4̅) (same H-M symbol)
- Space group: I4̅

Identification
- Color: Colorless to white
- Cleavage: Perfect; On {110}
- Tenacity: Brittle
- Mohs scale hardness: 3
- Luster: Vitreous
- Diaphaneity: Transparent
- Density: 3.156 g/cm^{3}

Cahnite (Cahnit in German, Cahnita in Spanish, Канит in Russian) is a brittle white or colorless mineral that has perfect cleavage and is usually transparent. It usually forms tetragonal-shaped crystals and it has a hardness of 3 mohs. Cahnite was discovered in the year 1921. It was named Cahnite to honor Lazard Cahn (1865–1940), who was a mineral collector and dealer. It is usually found in the Franklin Mine, in Franklin, New Jersey, but has also been found in Japan as well as in the Vallerano quarries in Rome, Italy. The geological environment that it occurs in is in pegmatites cutting a changed zinc orebody. The chemical formula for cahnite is Ca_{2}B[AsO_{4}](OH)_{4}. It is made up of 26.91% calcium, 3.63% boron, 25.15% arsenic, 1.35% hydrogen, and 42.96% oxygen. It has a molecular weight of 297.91 grams. Cahnite is not radioactive. Cahnite is associated with these other minerals: willemite, rhodonite, pyrochroite, hedyphane, datolite, and baryte.
