= Adam Hill (baseball) =

American baseball player (born 1997)

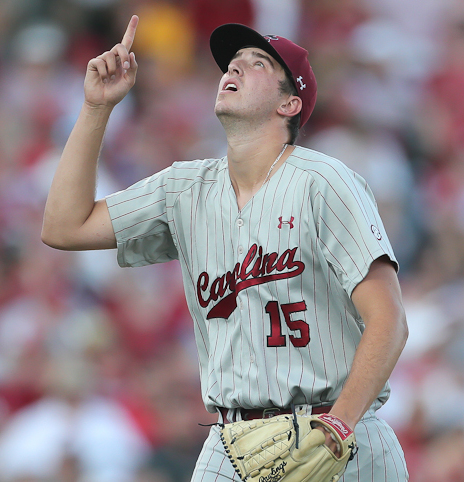
- Hill with the South Carolina Gamecocks
- Pitcher
- Born: March 24, 1997 (age 29); Anderson, South Carolina, U.S.
- Bats: Right Throws: Right
- Stats at Baseball Reference

Adam Dean Hill (born March 24, 1997) is an American former professional baseball pitcher.

== Amateur career ==
Hill attended T. L. Hanna High School in Anderson, South Carolina. He was drafted by the San Diego Padres in the 39th round of the 2015 MLB draft, but he elected to honor his college commitment to the University of South Carolina. In his first year with the Gamecocks, he posted a 3.53 ERA in 66. innings, allowing 49 hits, walking 28, and striking out 72. In his sophomore year, he posted a 3.04 ERA in 77 innings, allowing 56 hits, walking 39, and striking out 87. Through 14 starts this season, Hill has posted a 4.08 ERA over 75 innings, allowing 49 hits, walking 46, and striking out 92. In 2017, he played collegiate summer baseball with the Chatham Anglers of the Cape Cod Baseball League.

== Professional career ==
=== New York Mets ===
Hill was drafted by the New York Mets in the fourth round, with the 110th overall selection, of the 2018 Major League Baseball draft. On June 22, 2018, the Mets officially signed him. He spent his first professional season with the Brooklyn Cyclones, going 1–1 with a 2.35 ERA over 15 1/3 relief innings pitched.

=== Milwaukee Brewers ===
On January 5, 2019, the Mets traded Hill, Bobby Wahl, and Felix Valerio to the Milwaukee Brewers for Keon Broxton. He spent 2019 with the Wisconsin Timber Rattlers, going 7–9 with a 3.92 ERA over 26 games (23 starts), striking out 109 over 121 2/3 innings.

=== Seattle Mariners ===
On December 5, 2019, Hill and a 2020 competitive balance round B draft pick were traded to the Seattle Mariners in exchange for Omar Narváez. He did not play in a game in 2020 due to the cancellation of the minor league season because of the COVID-19 pandemic. In 2021, Hill started 19 games between the Everett AquaSox and the Arkansas Travelers, going 5–7 with a 5.44 ERA and 102 strikeouts over 91 innings. He was released by the Mariners organization on March 13, 2023.
