= Refugio High School (Texas) =

Public school in Texas, United States

Location
- 212 W Vance St. Refugio, Texas 78377-2530; United States; 28.31481°N 97.275°W

Information
- School type: Public high school
- School district: Refugio Independent School District
- Principal: Melissa Gonzales
- Teaching staff: 18.60 (FTE)
- Grades: 9–12
- Enrollment: 218 (2023–2024)
- Student to teacher ratio: 11.72
- Colors: Black & Orange
- Athletics conference: UIL Class AA
- Mascot: Bobcat
- Website: www.refugioisd.net/o/rhs

Refugio High School is a 2A public high school located in Refugio, Texas (USA). It is part of the Refugio Independent School District located in central Refugio County. In 2015, the school was accredited and met state academic standards.

== Athletics ==
The Refugio Bobcats compete in the following sports:

Volleyball, Football, Basketball, Powerlifting, Golf, Tennis, Track, Softball & Baseball

=== State Titles ===
- Football -
  - 1970(2A)^, 1982(3A), 2011(2A/D2), 2016(2A/D1), 2019(2A/D1)
- Girls Powerlifting -
  - 2010(2A)
- Girls Golf -
  - 2005(2A)
- Boys Track -
  - 1981(3A), 1982(3A), 1983(3A), 1987(2A), 1990(2A), 1993(2A), 1994(2A), 1995(2A), 2000(2A), 2001(2A), 2022(2A), 2023(2A)
- Girls Track -
  - 1985(3A), 1986(3A), 1987(2A), 1988(2A), 1989(2A), 1992(2A), 2018(2A), 2023(2A), 2026(2A)
- Volleyball -
  - 1973(2A), 1985(3A)

==== State Finalists ====
- Football -
  - 1968(3A), 1987(2A), 2013 (2A), 2015(2A/D1), 2017(2A/D1), 2022(2A/D1)
- Volleyball -
  - 1980(3A)

^Was Co-Champion with Iowa Park High School
