= 2020 Michigan Wolverines baseball team =

American college baseball season

2020 Michigan Wolverines baseball
- Conference: Big Ten Conference
- Record: 8–7 (0–0 Big Ten)
- Head coach: Erik Bakich (8th season)
- Assistant coach: Michael Brdar (3rd season)
- Hitting coach: Nick Schnabel (8th season)
- Pitching coach: Chris Fetter (3rd season)
- Home stadium: Wilpon Baseball Complex

2020 Big Ten Conference baseball standings
	Conf.				Overall
Team	W		L	PCT	W		L	PCT
Iowa ‍‍‍	0	–	0	–	10	–	5	.667
Maryland ‍‍‍	0	–	0	–	10	–	5	.667
Penn State ‍‍‍	0	–	0	–	10	–	5	.667
Illinois ‍‍‍	0	–	0	–	8	–	5	.615
Indiana ‍‍‍	0	–	0	–	9	–	6	.600
Michigan State ‍‍‍	0	–	0	–	9	–	6	.600
Michigan ‍‍‍	0	–	0	–	8	–	7	.533
Purdue ‍‍‍	0	–	0	–	7	–	7	.500
Northwestern ‍‍‍	0	–	0	–	6	–	6	.500
Nebraska ‍‍‍	0	–	0	–	7	–	8	.467
Minnesota ‍‍‍	0	–	0	–	8	–	10	.444
Ohio State ‍‍‍	0	–	0	–	6	–	8	.429
Rutgers ‍‍‍	0	–	0	–	6	–	9	.400
‡ – Tournament champion As of March 12, 2020; Rankings from D1Baseball

The 2020 Michigan Wolverines baseball team represented the University of Michigan in the 2020 NCAA Division I baseball season. The Wolverines, led by head coach Erik Bakich in his eighth season, are a member of the Big Ten Conference and played their home games at Wilpon Baseball Complex in Ann Arbor, Michigan. On March 12, 2020, the Big Ten Conference cancelled the remainder of all winter and spring sports seasons due to the COVID-19 pandemic.

== Previous season ==
The Wolverines finished the 2019 season 50–22 overall, including 16–7 in conference play, finishing in second place in their conference. Following the conclusion of the regular season, the Wolverines qualified to play in the 2019 Big Ten Conference baseball tournament, where the Wolverines lost in the semifinals of the Big Ten Tournament to Nebraska. Michigan received an at-large bid to the 2019 NCAA Division I baseball tournament, where they advanced to the College World Series and lost in the championship game to Vanderbilt.

== Preseason ==
Michigan was the only Big Ten Conference team to appear in every national preseason top-25 ranking. The Wolverines were ranked No. 8 by Baseball America, No. 10 by Collegiate Baseball, No. 11 by ESPN/USA Today Coaches Poll, No. 12 by NCBWA, and No. 13 by D1Baseball in their respective preseason polls.

== Roster ==
2020 Michigan Wolverines baseball team
Players
Coaches

#	Pos.	Name	B/T	Height	Weight	Year	Previous school	Home town
0	C	Joe Donovan	R/R	5 ft 11 in (1.8 m)	180 lb (82 kg)	Jr	Westmont	Clarendon Hills, Illinois
2	INF	Jack Blomgren	R/R	5 ft 10 in (1.78 m)	180 lb (82 kg)	Jr	Craig	Milton, Wisconsin
3	INF	Ted Burton	R/R	6 ft 2 in (1.88 m)	170 lb (77 kg)	Fr	Edison	Huntington Beach, California
5	OF	Christian Bullock	L/L	5 ft 10 in (1.78 m)	175 lb (79 kg)	Sr	Morgan Park	Chicago, Illinois
6	RHP	Danny Zimmerman	R/R	6 ft 4 in (1.93 m)	225 lb (102 kg)	RS So	Redondo Union	Redondo Beach, California
7	OF	Jesse Franklin V	L/L	6 ft 1 in (1.85 m)	215 lb (98 kg)	Jr	Seattle Prep	Seattle, Washington
8	INF	Jimmy Obertop	R/R	6 ft 1 in (1.85 m)	220 lb (100 kg)	Fr	Westminster Christian Academy	St. Louis, Missouri
9	INF	Matthew Schmidt	R/R	6 ft 2 in (1.88 m)	210 lb (95 kg)	RS Sr	Regis Jesuit	Parker, Colorado
10	INF	Cam Hart	R/R	6 ft 4 in (1.93 m)	205 lb (93 kg)	So	Armada	Armada, Michigan
11	C	Harrison Salter	R/R	6 ft 3 in (1.91 m)	215 lb (98 kg)	RS Jr	St. Mary's Prep	Bloomfield Hills, Michigan
12	INF	Riley Bertram	S/R	6 ft 0 in (1.83 m)	180 lb (82 kg)	So	Zionsville	Zionsville, Indiana
13	OF	Dominic Clementi	L/R	6 ft 1 in (1.85 m)	190 lb (86 kg)	Sr	Arrowhead	Hartland, Wisconsin
14	LHP	Benjamin Keizer	L/L	6 ft 3 in (1.91 m)	215 lb (98 kg)	RS Sr	Portage Northern	Portage, Michigan
15	INF	Clark Elliott	L/R	5 ft 10 in (1.78 m)	170 lb (77 kg)	Fr	Barrington	Barrington, Illinois
17	RHP	Jeff Criswell	R/R	6 ft 4 in (1.93 m)	225 lb (102 kg)	Jr	Portage Central	Portage, Michigan
18	C	Jordan Rodgers	R/R	5 ft 8 in (1.73 m)	175 lb (79 kg)	RS Fr	Simeon Career Academy	Chicago, Illinois
19	RHP	Dillon Nowicki	R/R	6 ft 2 in (1.88 m)	200 lb (91 kg)	RS Fr	Stoughton	Stoughton, Wisconsin
20	RHP	Willie Weiss	R/R	6 ft 3 in (1.91 m)	205 lb (93 kg)	So	Westview	Portland, Oregon
21	LHP	Ben Dragani	L/L	6 ft 5 in (1.96 m)	225 lb (102 kg)	RS So	Catholic Memorial	Brookfield, Wisconsin
22	INF	Tito Flores	R/R	5 ft 10 in (1.78 m)	185 lb (84 kg)	Fr	Brother Rice	Detroit, Michigan
24	C	Casey Buckley	L/R	6 ft 1 in (1.85 m)	190 lb (86 kg)	So	Los Alamitos	Long Beach, California
25	RHP	Isaiah Paige	R/R	6 ft 1 in (1.85 m)	200 lb (91 kg)	RS So	Damien	Diamond Bar, California
26	OF	Joey Velazquez	L/L	6 ft 0 in (1.83 m)	215 lb (98 kg)	Fr	St. Francis DeSales	Lewis Center, Ohio
27	LHP	Steve Hajjar	R/L	6 ft 5 in (1.96 m)	215 lb (98 kg)	So	Central Catholic	Andover, Massachusetts
28	RHP	Keaton Carratini	R/R	6 ft 2 in (1.88 m)	190 lb (86 kg)	So	La Costa Canyon	Encinitas, California
29	RHP	Blake Beers	R/R	6 ft 4 in (1.93 m)	215 lb (98 kg)	Jr	Loyola	Manhattan Beach, California
30	LHP	Jack White	L/L	6 ft 3 in (1.91 m)	195 lb (88 kg)	So	Athens Academy	Bethesda, Maryland
32	RHP	Joe Pace	R/R	5 ft 9 in (1.75 m)	200 lb (91 kg)	RS Sr	Notre Dame	Valley Village, California
34	LHP	Colin Czajkowski	L/L	6 ft 4 in (1.93 m)	195 lb (88 kg)	Fr	Woodhaven	Brownstown, Michigan
35	LHP	Walker Cleveland	L/L	6 ft 2 in (1.88 m)	145 lb (66 kg)	So	North Gwinnett	Suwanee, Georgia
40	LHP	Angelo Smith	L/L	5 ft 9 in (1.75 m)	160 lb (73 kg)	Jr	Richards	Thornton, Illinois
42	OF	Jordan Nwogu	R/R	6 ft 3 in (1.91 m)	235 lb (107 kg)	Jr	Pioneer	Ann Arbor, Michigan
45	INF	Logan Pollack	L/R	6 ft 2 in (1.88 m)	185 lb (84 kg)	Jr	Notre Dame Academy	Los Angeles, California
47	LHP	Jacob Denner	L/L	6 ft 0 in (1.83 m)	215 lb (98 kg)	Fr	Bergen Catholic	Closter, New Jersey
51	INF	Jack Van Remortel	R/R	6 ft 1 in (1.85 m)	220 lb (100 kg)	So	Carmel	Carmel, Indiana
55	RHP	Cameron Weston	R/R	6 ft 1 in (1.85 m)	200 lb (91 kg)	Fr	Canon-McMillan	Canonsburg, Pennsylvania

Head coach

Erik Bakich

Assistant coach(es)

Michael Brdar

Hitting coach(es)

Nick Schnabel

Pitching coach(es)

Chris Fetter

Legend

- (C) Team captain
- (S) Suspended
- (I) Ineligible
- Injured
- Current redshirt

Roster
Last update: February 9, 2020

== Schedule ==
2020 Michigan Wolverines baseball game log
Regular season (8–7)

February (5–4)
#	Date	Opponent	Rank	Stadium Site	Score	Win	Loss	Save	Attendance	Overall Record	B1G Record
1	February 14	vs. No. 2 Vanderbilt	No. 13	Salt River Fields at Talking Stick; Scottsdale, Arizona	4–3	**Keizer** (1–0)	Brown (0–1)	**Paige** (1)	4,500	1–0	–
2	February 15	vs. Cal Poly	No. 13	Salt River Fields at Talking Stick; Scottsdale, Arizona	8–5	**Beers** (1–0)	Alvarez (0–1)	**Weston** (1)	875	2–0	–
3	February 15	at No. 9 Arizona State	No. 13	Phoenix Municipal Stadium; Phoenix, Arizona	5–0	**Hajjar** (1–0)	Benson (0–1)	**White** (1)	4,740	3–0	–
4	February 16	vs. UConn	No. 13	Salt River Fields at Talking Stick; Scottsdale, Arizona	1–7	Krauth (1–0)	**Paige** (0–1)	—	502	3–1	–
5	February 21	vs. UConn	No. 9	First Data Field; Port St. Lucie, Florida,	7–8	Haus (1–0)	**Keizer** (1–1)	Wurster (1)	250	3–2	–
6	February 22	vs. UConn	No. 9	First Data Field; Port St. Lucie, Florida	14–2	**Hajjar** (2–0)	Dunlop (0–1)	**Denner** (1)	440	4–2	–
7	February 23	vs. UConn	No. 9	First Data Field; Port St. Lucie, Florida	2–9	Krauth (2–0)	**Beers** (1–1)	—	475	4–3	–
8	February 28	at Cal Poly	No. 16	Robin Baggett Stadium; San Luis Obispo, California	4–3 ^{(10)}	**Weston** (1–0)	Woo (0–2)	—	1,898	5–3	–
9	February 29	at Cal Poly	No. 16	Robin Baggett Stadium; San Luis Obispo, California	4–5 ^{(10)}	Scott (1–1)	**White** (0–1)	—	2,040	5–4	–

March (3–3)
#	Date	Opponent	Rank	Stadium Site	Score	Win	Loss	Save	Attendance	Overall Record	B1G Record
10	March 1	at Cal Poly	No. 16	Robin Baggett Stadium; San Luis Obispo, California	4–2	**Beers** (2–1)	Thorpe (1–1)	**Keizer** (1)	1,820	6–4	–
11	March 3	at Stanford	No. 16	Klein Field at Sunken Diamond; Palo Alto, California	4–5	Parthasarathy (1–0)	**Smith** (0–2)	Grech (2)	1,067	6–5	–
12	March 4	at California	No. 16	Evans Diamond; Berkeley, California	5–0	**Cleveland** (1–0)	Gather (0–1)	—	758	7–5	–
13	March 6	at No. 24 Pepperdine	No. 16	Eddy D. Field Stadium; Malibu, California	2–12	Jensen (3–0)	**Criswell** (0–1)	Morrow (1)	432	7–6	–
14	March 7	at No. 24 Pepperdine	No. 16	Eddy D. Field Stadium; Malibu, California	7–4	**Hajjar** (3–0)	Kniskern (2–1)	**Weston** (2)	476	8–6	–
15	March 7	at No. 24 Pepperdine	No. 16	Eddy D. Field Stadium; Malibu, California	1–6	Groen (2–1)	**Beers** (2–2)	—	532	8–7	–
16	March 13	Canisius		Ray Fisher Stadium; Ann Arbor, Michigan,							
17	March 14	Canisius		Ray Fisher Stadium; Ann Arbor, Michigan							
18	March 14	Canisius		Ray Fisher Stadium; Ann Arbor, Michigan							
19	March 15	Canisius		Ray Fisher Stadium; Ann Arbor, Michigan							
20	March 20	Purdue		Ray Fisher Stadium; Ann Arbor, Michigan							
21	March 21	Purdue		Ray Fisher Stadium; Ann Arbor, Michigan							
22	March 22	Purdue		Ray Fisher Stadium; Ann Arbor, Michigan							
23	March 25	Western Michigan		Ray Fisher Stadium; Ann Arbor, Michigan							
24	March 27	Nevada		Ray Fisher Stadium; Ann Arbor, Michigan							
25	March 28	Nevada		Ray Fisher Stadium; Ann Arbor, Michigan							
26	March 29	Nevada		Ray Fisher Stadium; Ann Arbor, Michigan							

April (0–0)
#	Date	Opponent	Rank	Stadium Site	Score	Win	Loss	Save	Attendance	Overall Record	B1G Record
27	April 1	Bowling Green		Ray Fisher Stadium; Ann Arbor, Michigan							
28	April 3	at Illinois		Illinois Field; Champaign, Illinois,							
29	April 4	at Illinois		Illinois Field; Champaign, Illinois							
30	April 5	at Illinois		Illinois Field; Champaign, Illinois							
31	April 8	Eastern Michigan		Ray Fisher Stadium; Ann Arbor, Michigan							
32	April 10	Ohio State		Ray Fisher Stadium; Ann Arbor, Michigan							
33	April 11	Ohio State		Ray Fisher Stadium; Ann Arbor, Michigan							
34	April 12	Ohio State		Ray Fisher Stadium; Ann Arbor, Michigan							
35	April 14	vs. Michigan State		Drayton McLane Stadium; East Lansing, Michigan,							
36	April 17	at Penn State		Medlar Field; State College, Pennsylvania							
37	April 18	at Penn State		Medlar Field; State College, Pennsylvania							
38	April 19	at Penn State		Medlar Field; State College, Pennsylvania							
39	April 21	Central Michigan		Ray Fisher Stadium; Ann Arbor, Michigan							
40	April 24	Nebraska		Ray Fisher Stadium; Ann Arbor, Michigan							
41	April 25	Nebraska		Ray Fisher Stadium; Ann Arbor, Michigan							
42	April 26	Nebraska		Ray Fisher Stadium; Ann Arbor, Michigan							

May (0–0)
#	Date	Opponent	Rank	Stadium Site	Score	Win	Loss	Save	Attendance	Overall Record	B1G Record
43	May 1	at Indiana		Bart Kaufman Field; Bloomington, Indiana							
44	May 2	at Indiana		Bart Kaufman Field; Bloomington, Indiana							
45	May 3	at Indiana		Bart Kaufman Field; Bloomington, Indiana							
46	May 5	Michigan State		Ray Fisher Stadium; Ann Arbor, Michigan							
47	May 8	at Minnesota		Siebert Field; Minneapolis, Minnesota,							
48	May 9	at Minnesota		Siebert Field; Minneapolis, Minnesota							
49	May 10	at Minnesota		Siebert Field; Minneapolis, Minnesota							
50	May 12	Toledo		Ray Fisher Stadium; Ann Arbor, Michigan							
51	May 14	Iowa		Ray Fisher Stadium; Ann Arbor, Michigan							
52	May 15	Iowa		Ray Fisher Stadium; Ann Arbor, Michigan							
53	May 16	Iowa		Ray Fisher Stadium; Ann Arbor, Michigan							

- Win
- Loss
- Postponement
- Bold: Wolverines team member
- Rankings from D1Baseball.com.
- (#) Tournament seedings in parentheses.

== Rankings ==
Ranking movements Legend: ██ Increase in ranking ██ Decrease in ranking — = Not ranked RV = Received votes
	Week																		
Poll	Pre	1	2	3	4	5	6	7	8	9	10	11	12	13	14	15	16	17	Final
Coaches'	11	11*		20	RV														
Baseball America	8	1	5	10	25														
Collegiate Baseball^	10	3	9	11	—														
NCBWA†	12	9	18	17	27														
D1Baseball	13	9	16	16	—														

^ Collegiate Baseball ranked 40 teams in their preseason poll, but only ranked 30 teams weekly during the season.
† NCBWA ranks 30 teams in their preseason poll, but only ranks 25 teams weekly during the season.
* A new poll was not released for this week, so for comparison purposes, the previous week's ranking is inserted in this week's slot.

== Major League Baseball draft ==
The following Wolverines were selected in the 2020 Major League Baseball draft:

List of Drafted Players
Name	2020 Class	Pos.	Team	Overall
Jeff Criswell	Junior	RHP	Oakland Athletics	58th
Jordan Nwogu	Junior	OF	Chicago Cubs	88th
Jesse Franklin V	Junior	OF	Atlanta Braves	97th
Jack Blomgren	Junior	INF	Colorado Rockies	140th
