= 2019 Michigan Wolverines baseball team =

American college baseball season

2019 Michigan Wolverines baseball

Corvallis Regional champions Los Angeles Super Regional champions

College World Series, Runner-Up
- Conference: Big Ten Conference

Ranking
- Coaches: No. 2
- CB: No. 2
- Record: 50–22 (16–7 Big Ten)
- Head coach: Erik Bakich (7th season)
- Assistant coach: Michael Brdar (2nd season)
- Hitting coach: Nick Schnabel (7th season)
- Pitching coach: Chris Fetter (2nd season)
- MVP: Jordan Brewer
- Home stadium: Wilpon Baseball Complex

2019 Big Ten Conference baseball standings
	Conf.				Overall
Team	W		L	PCT	W		L	PCT
Indiana ‍†‍‍^{y}	17	–	7	.708	37	–	23	.617
No. 2 Michigan ‍‍‍^{y}	16	–	7	.696	50	–	22	.694
Illinois ‍‍‍^{y}	15	–	9	.625	36	–	21	.632
Nebraska ‍‍‍^{y}	15	–	9	.625	32	–	24	.571
Minnesota ‍‍‍	15	–	9	.625	29	–	27	.518
Ohio State ‍‍‡‍^{y}	12	–	12	.500	36	–	27	.571
Iowa ‍‍‍	12	–	12	.500	31	–	24	.564
Maryland ‍‍‍	12	–	12	.500	29	–	29	.500
Northwestern ‍‍‍	11	–	13	.458	24	–	27	.471
Rutgers ‍‍‍	9	–	14	.391	20	–	31	.392
Michigan State ‍‍‍	8	–	15	.348	20	–	34	.370
Purdue ‍‍‍	7	–	16	.304	20	–	34	.370
Penn State ‍‍‍	4	–	18	.182	22	–	27	.449
† – Conference champion ‡ – Tournament champion y – Invited to the NCAA tournament As of July 4, 2019; Rankings from D1Baseball

The 2019 Michigan Wolverines baseball team represented the University of Michigan in the 2019 NCAA Division I baseball season. The Wolverines, led by head coach Erik Bakich in his seventh season, were a member of the Big Ten Conference and played their home games at Wilpon Baseball Complex in Ann Arbor, Michigan. The Wolverines finished the season with a 50–22 record, including 16–7 in conference play, marking their first 50 win season since 1987.

The Wolverines received an at-large bid to the 2019 NCAA Division I baseball tournament. They defeated Creighton in the regional finals and UCLA in the super regionals to advance to the College World Series for the first time since 1984. They became the first Big Ten Conference team to advance to the College World Series since Indiana in 2013, and the first Big Ten Conference team to advance to the championship round in the College World Series since Ohio State in 1966.

== Previous season ==
The Wolverines finished the 2018 NCAA Division I baseball season 33–21 overall, including 15–8 in conference play, finishing in third place in their conference. Following the conclusion of the regular season, the Wolverines qualified to play in the 2018 Big Ten Conference baseball tournament. The Wolverines would eventually lose in the second round of the Big Ten Tournament to Ohio State by a score of 3–5.

== Preseason ==
Michigan was the only Big Ten Conference team to appear in every national preseason top-25 ranking. The Wolverines were ranked No. 17 by D1Baseball, No. 20 by Baseball America, No. 23 by NCBWA and No. 25 by ESPN/USA Today Coaches Poll in their respective preseason polls.

== Roster ==
2019 Michigan Wolverines baseball team
Players
Coaches

#	Pos.	Name	B/T	Height	Weight	Year	Previous school	Home town
0	C	Joe Donovan	R/R	5 ft 11 in (1.8 m)	180 lb (82 kg)	So	Westmont H. S.	Clarendon Hills, Illinois
2	INF	Jack Blomgren	R/R	5 ft 10 in (1.78 m)	180 lb (82 kg)	So	Craig H. S.	Milton, Wisconsin
3	OF	Miles Lewis	S/R	6 ft 1 in (1.85 m)	215 lb (98 kg)	RS Sr	Hudson H. S.	Hudson, Wisconsin
4	INF	Ako Thomas	R/R	5 ft 7 in (1.7 m)	165 lb (75 kg)	Sr	Mount Carmel H. S.	Chicago, Illinois
5	OF	Christian Bullock	L/L	5 ft 10 in (1.78 m)	175 lb (79 kg)	Jr	Morgan Park H. S.	Chicago, Illinois
6	RHP	Danny Zimmerman	R/R	6 ft 4 in (1.93 m)	225 lb (102 kg)	So	Redondo Union H. S.	Redondo Beach, California
7	OF	Jesse Franklin V	L/L	6 ft 1 in (1.85 m)	215 lb (98 kg)	So	Seattle Prep	Seattle, Washington
8	INF	Matthew Schmidt	R/R	6 ft 2 in (1.88 m)	210 lb (95 kg)	Sr	Regis Jesuit H. S.	Parker, Colorado
10	INF	Blake Nelson	R/R	6 ft 0 in (1.83 m)	175 lb (79 kg)	Sr	Mount Rainier H. S.	Normandy Park, Washington
11	C	Harrison Salter	R/R	6 ft 3 in (1.91 m)	215 lb (98 kg)	RS So	St. Mary's Prep	Bloomfield Hills, Michigan
12	INF	Riley Bertram	S/R	6 ft 0 in (1.83 m)	180 lb (82 kg)	Fr	Zionsville H. S.	Zionsville, Indiana
13	OF	Dominic Clementi	L/R	6 ft 1 in (1.85 m)	190 lb (86 kg)	Jr	Arrowhead H. S.	Hartland, Wisconsin
14	LHP	Benjamin Keizer	L/L	6 ft 3 in (1.91 m)	215 lb (98 kg)	RS Jr	Portage Northern H. S.	Portage, Michigan
15	INF	Jimmy Kerr (C)	L/R	6 ft 2 in (1.88 m)	205 lb (93 kg)	Sr	Notre Dame Prep H. S.	Scottsdale, Arizona
17	RHP	Jeff Criswell	R/R	6 ft 4 in (1.93 m)	225 lb (102 kg)	So	Portage Central H. S.	Portage, Michigan
18	C	Jordan Rodgers	R/R	5 ft 8 in (1.73 m)	175 lb (79 kg)	Fr	Simeon Career Academy	Chicago, Illinois
19	RHP	Dillon Nowicki	R/R	6 ft 2 in (1.88 m)	200 lb (91 kg)	Fr	Stoughton H. S.	Stoughton, Wisconsin
20	RHP	Willie Weiss	R/R	6 ft 3 in (1.91 m)	205 lb (93 kg)	Fr	Westview H. S.	Portland, Oregon
21	LHP	Ben Dragani	L/L	6 ft 5 in (1.96 m)	225 lb (102 kg)	So	Catholic Memorial H. S.	Brookfield, Wisconsin
22	OF	Jordan Brewer	R/L	6 ft 1 in (1.85 m)	195 lb (88 kg)	Jr	Lincoln Trail College	St. Joseph, Michigan
24	C	Casey Buckley	L/R	6 ft 1 in (1.85 m)	190 lb (86 kg)	Fr	Los Alamitos H. S.	Long Beach, California
25	RHP	Isaiah Paige	R/R	6 ft 1 in (1.85 m)	200 lb (91 kg)	RS Fr	Damien H. S.	Diamond Bar, California
27	LHP	Steve Hajjar	R/L	6 ft 5 in (1.96 m)	215 lb (98 kg)	Fr	Central Catholic H. S.	Andover, Massachusetts
28	RHP	Keaton Carratini	R/R	6 ft 2 in (1.88 m)	190 lb (86 kg)	Fr	La Costa Canyon H. S.	Encinitas, California
29	RHP	Blake Beers	R/R	6 ft 4 in (1.93 m)	215 lb (98 kg)	So	Loyola H. S.	Manhattan Beach, California
30	LHP	Jack White	L/L	6 ft 3 in (1.91 m)	195 lb (88 kg)	Fr	Athens Academy	Bethesda, Maryland
32	RHP	Joe Pace	R/R	5 ft 9 in (1.75 m)	200 lb (91 kg)	RS Jr	Notre Dame H. S.	Valley Village, California
34	RHP	Jack Bredeson	R/R	6 ft 5 in (1.96 m)	220 lb (100 kg)	Sr	Arrowhead H. S.	Hartland, Wisconsin
35	LHP	Walker Cleveland	L/L	6 ft 2 in (1.88 m)	145 lb (66 kg)	Fr	North Gwinnett H. S.	Suwanee, Georgia
37	RHP	Karl Kauffmann	R/R	6 ft 2 in (1.88 m)	200 lb (91 kg)	Jr	Brother Rice H. S.	Bloomfield Hills, Michigan
40	LHP	Angelo Smith	L/L	5 ft 9 in (1.75 m)	160 lb (73 kg)	So	Richards H. S.	Thornton, Illinois
42	OF	Jordan Nwogu	R/R	6 ft 3 in (1.91 m)	235 lb (107 kg)	So	Pioneer H. S.	Ann Arbor, Michigan
47	LHP	Tommy Henry	L/L	6 ft 3 in (1.91 m)	205 lb (93 kg)	Jr	Portage Northern H. S.	Portage, Michigan
48	RHP	Jack Weisenburger	R/R	6 ft 3 in (1.91 m)	220 lb (100 kg)	Jr	Rockford H. S.	Rockford, Michigan
51	INF	Jack Van Remortel	R/R	6 ft 1 in (1.85 m)	220 lb (100 kg)	Fr	Carmel H. S.	Carmel, Indiana

Head coach

Erik Bakich

Assistant coach(es)

Michael Brdar

Hitting coach(es)

Nick Schnabel

Pitching coach(es)

Chris Fetter

Legend

- (C) Team captain
- (S) Suspended
- (I) Ineligible
- Injured
- Current redshirt

Roster
Last update: June 10, 2019

== Schedule ==
2019 Michigan Wolverines baseball game log
Regular season (38–16)

February (6–0)
#	Date	Opponent	Rank	Stadium Site	Score	Win	Loss	Save	Attendance	Overall Record	B1G Record
1	February 15	vs Binghamton	No. 17	First Data Field; Port St. Lucie, Florida,	10–0	**Henry** (1–0)	Gallagher (0–1)	—	375	1–0	–
2	February 16	vs Binghamton	No. 17	First Data Field; Port St. Lucie, Florida	5–4	**Kauffmann** (1–0)	Miller (0–1)	**Weiss** (1)	325	2–0	–
3	February 17	vs Binghamton	No. 17	First Data Field; Port St. Lucie, Florida	12–2	**Criswell** (1–0)	VanScoter (0–1)	—	325	3–0	–
4	February 22	at The Citadel	No. 17	Joseph P. Riley Jr. Park; Charleston, South Carolina,	2–0	**Henry** (2–0)	Merritt (0–2)	—	358	4–0	–
5	February 23	at The Citadel	No. 17	Joseph P. Riley Jr. Park; Charleston, South Carolina	9–1	**Kauffmann** (2–0)	Connolly (1–1)	—	622	5–0	–
6	February 24	at The Citadel	No. 17	Joseph P. Riley Jr. Park; Charleston, South Carolina	6–3	**Weiss** (1–0)	Spence (1–1)	**Keizer** (1)	278	6–0	–

March (13–7)
#	Date	Opponent	Rank	Stadium Site	Score	Win	Loss	Save	Attendance	Overall Record	B1G Record
7	March 1	at CSUN	No. 17	Matador Field; Northridge, California	2–1	**Henry** (3–0)	Armstrong (0–1)	**Weiss** (2)	346	7–0	–
—	March 2	at CSUN	Postponed								
8	March 3	at CSUN	No. 17	Matador Field; Northridge, California	4–2	**Kauffmann** (3–0)	Moore (1–1)	**Weiss** (3)	394	8–0	–
9	March 3	at CSUN	No. 17	Matador Field; Northridge, California	2–5	Nunez (3–0)	**Criswell** (1–1)	Schriever (3)	394	8–1	–
10	March 5	at Long Beach State	No. 16	Blair Field; Long Beach, California	7–8	Pacheco (1–1)	**Beers** (0–1)	Spacke (1)	1,007	8–2	–
11	March 8	at #2 UCLA	No. 16	Jackie Robinson Stadium; Los Angeles, California	7–5	**Henry** (4–0)	Pettway (0–1)	**Weiss** (4)	1,271	9–2	–
12	March 9	at USC	No. 16	Dedeaux Field; Los Angeles, California	1–4	Esqueda (1–0)	**Kauffmann** (3–1)	Lunn (1)	658	9–3	–
13	March 10	vs. Oklahoma State	No. 16	Dodger Stadium; Los Angeles, California	2–3 ^{(10)}	Basso (1–0)	**Weiss** (1–1)	Leeper (3)	—	9–4	–
14	March 14	Manhattan		Ray Fisher Stadium; Ann Arbor, Michigan,	5–1	**Henry** (5–0)	Takacs (0–4)	—	215	10–4	–
15	March 15	Manhattan		Ray Fisher Stadium; Ann Arbor, Michigan	23–2	**Kauffmann** (4–1)	Galvan (0–3)	—	352	11–4	–
16	March 16	Manhattan		Ray Fisher Stadium; Ann Arbor, Michigan	16–7	**Keizer** (1–0)	Cain (2–1)	**Weiss** (5)	379	12–4	–
17	March 17	Manhattan		Ray Fisher Stadium; Ann Arbor, Michigan	4–0 ^{(7)}	**Paige** (1–0)	Stuart (1–2)	—	387	13–4	–
18	March 19	Western Michigan	No. 24	Ray Fisher Stadium; Ann Arbor, Michigan	12–5	**Cleveland** (1–0)	Mullen (1–3)	—	446	14–4	–
19	March 21	at #19 Texas Tech	No. 24	Dan Law Field; Lubbock, Texas,	2–11	Dallas (2–0)	**Henry** (5–1)	—	3,334	14–5	–
20	March 22	at #19 Texas Tech	No. 24	Dan Law Field; Lubbock, Texas	3–10	Kilian (2–2)	**Kauffmann** (4–2)	—	3,302	14–6	–
21	March 23	at #19 Texas Tech	No. 24	Dan Law Field; Lubbock, Texas	5–8	Freeman (2–0)	**Cleveland** (1–1)	Beeter (4)	4,432	14–7	–
22	March 23	vs. Stetson	No. 24	Dan Law Field; Lubbock, Texas	16–6	**Paige** (2–0)	Peto (0–4)	—	4,432	15–7	–
23	March 27	San Jose State		Ray Fisher Stadium; Ann Arbor, Michigan	1–0 ^{(7)}	**Cleveland** (2–1)	Polack (1–1)	**Kauffmann** (1)	—	16–7	–
24	March 27	San Jose State		Ray Fisher Stadium; Ann Arbor, Michigan	3–0 ^{(7)}	**Smith** (1–0)	Konishi (0–2)	**Weiss** (6)	—	17–7	–
25	March 29	at Michigan State		Drayton McLane Stadium; East Lansing, Michigan,	6–3	**Henry** (6–1)	Erla (1–5)	—	1,318	18–7	1–0
26	March 30	Michigan State		Ray Fisher Stadium; Ann Arbor, Michigan	16–2	**Kauffmann** (5–2)	Tyranski (0–5)	—	1,115	19–7	2–0
—	March 31	at Michigan State	Postponed								

April (12–4)
#	Date	Opponent	Rank	Stadium Site	Score	Win	Loss	Save	Attendance	Overall Record	B1G Record
27	April 3	Toledo		Ray Fisher Stadium; Ann Arbor, Michigan	8–2	**Cleveland** (2–1)	McAtee (0–1)	—	617	20–7	–
28	April 5	Minnesota		Ray Fisher Stadium; Ann Arbor, Michigan	4–6	Meyer (3–1)	**Henry** (6–2)	Schulze (4)	703	20–8	2–1
29	April 6	Minnesota		Ray Fisher Stadium; Ann Arbor, Michigan	5–3	**Weiss** (2–1)	Duffy (0–1)	—	1,168	21–8	3–1
30	April 7	Minnesota		Ray Fisher Stadium; Ann Arbor, Michigan	8–0	**Criswell** (2–1)	Culliver (2–2)	—	1,037	22–8	4–1
31	April 9	Indiana State		Ray Fisher Stadium; Ann Arbor, Michigan	7–8 ^{(10)}	Ward (3–1)	**Weiss** (2–2)	Grauer (6)	442	22–9	–
32	April 10	Indiana State		Ray Fisher Stadium; Ann Arbor, Michigan	6–4 ^{(6)}	**Weisenburger** (1–0)	Klein (0–1)	—	369	23–9	–
33	April 12	at Ohio State		Bill Davis Stadium; Columbus, Ohio,	5–10	Burhenn (5–1)	**Henry** (6–3)	—	1,815	23–10	4–2
34	April 13	at Ohio State		Bill Davis Stadium; Columbus, Ohio	4–10	Lonsway (5–3)	**Kauffmann** (5–3)	Pfennig (2)	5,280	23–11	4–3
35	April 13	at Ohio State		Bill Davis Stadium; Columbus, Ohio	3–2	**Criswell** (3–1)	Smith (3–2)	—	5,280	24–11	5–3
36	April 13	Bowling Green		Ray Fisher Stadium; Ann Arbor, Michigan	10–5	**Cleveland** (3–1)	Egnor (0–3)	—	478	25–11	–
—	April 19	Northwestern	Postponed								
37	April 20	Northwestern		Ray Fisher Stadium; Ann Arbor, Michigan	4–1	**Kauffmann** (6–3)	Lavelle (3–5)	**Weiss** (7)	950	26–11	6–3
38	April 21	Northwestern		Ray Fisher Stadium; Ann Arbor, Michigan	3–2	**Keizer** (2–0)	Bader (1–3)	**Weiss** (8)	1,134	27–11	7–3
39	April 21	Northwestern		Ray Fisher Stadium; Ann Arbor, Michigan	10–1	**Criswell** (4–1)	D'Alise (0–1)	—	1,134	28–11	8–3
40	April 26	Rutgers		Ray Fisher Stadium; Ann Arbor, Michigan	8–3	**Kauffmann** (7–3)	Rutkowski (2–4)	—	981	29–11	9–3
41	April 27	Rutgers		Ray Fisher Stadium; Ann Arbor, Michigan	10–1	**Henry** (7–3)	Genuario (2–4)	—	751	30–11	10–3
42	April 28	Rutgers		Ray Fisher Stadium; Ann Arbor, Michigan	4–1 ^{(10)}	**Keizer** (3–0)	Brito (3–4)	—	823	31–11	11–3

May (7–5)
#	Date	Opponent	Rank	Stadium Site	Score	Win	Loss	Save	Attendance	Overall Record	B1G Record
43	May 3	at Maryland		Shipley Field; College Park, Maryland	10–7	**Kauffmann** (8–3)	Parsons (8–3)	**Weiss** (9)	633	32–11	12–3
44	May 4	at Maryland		Shipley Field; College Park, Maryland	10–4	**Henry** (8–3)	Thompson (2–5)	—	817	33–11	13–3
45	May 5	at Maryland		Shipley Field; College Park, Maryland	13–1	**Criswell** (5–1)	LaBonte (1–6)	—	185	34–11	14–3
46	May 7	Michigan State		Ray Fisher Stadium; Ann Arbor, Michigan	7–0	**Keizer** (4–0)	Olson (0–4)	—	1,027	35–11	–
47	May 8	Eastern Michigan		Ray Fisher Stadium; Ann Arbor, Michigan	10–1	**Cleveland** (4–1)	Koons (0–1)	—	904	36–11	–
48	May 10	Indiana		Ray Fisher Stadium; Ann Arbor, Michigan	4–10	Milto (7–5)	**Kauffmann** (8–4)	—	1,418	36–12	14–4
49	May 11	Indiana		Ray Fisher Stadium; Ann Arbor, Michigan	8–10	Gordon (5–4)	**Henry** (8–4)	Lloyd (5)	1,540	36–13	14–5
50	May 12	Indiana		Ray Fisher Stadium; Ann Arbor, Michigan	6–5 ^{(11)}	**Paige** (4–0)	Sloan (2–3)	—	945	37–13	15–5
51	May 14	at Kentucky		Kentucky Proud Park; Lexington, Kentucky,	4–7	Ramsey (4–6)	**Cleveland** (4–2)	Coleman (5)	3,224	37–14	–
52	May 16	at Nebraska		Hawks Field; Lincoln, Nebraska,	2–5	Palkert (4–3)	**Kauffmann** (8–5)	Gomes (11)	4,724	37–15	15–6
53	May 17	at Nebraska		Hawks Field; Lincoln, Nebraska	0–7	Fisher (6–3)	**Henry** (8–5)	—	—	37–16	15–7
54	May 17	at Nebraska		Hawks Field; Lincoln, Nebraska	10–8	**Criswell** (6–1)	Schanaman (1–2)	Weisenburger (1)	6,888	38–16	16–7

Postseason (12–6)

B1G Tournament (3–2)
#	Date	Opponent	Rank	Stadium Site	Score	Win	Loss	Save	Attendance	Overall Record	B1GT Record
55	May 22	vs. Ohio State		TD Ameritrade Park Omaha; Omaha, Nebraska,	1–2	Pfennig (2–3)	**Kauffmann** (8–6)	Magno (11)	—	38–17	0–1
56	May 23	vs. No. 20 Illinois		TD Ameritrade Park Omaha; Omaha, Nebraska	5–4	**Weisenburger** (2–0)	Acton (2–3)	—	—	39–17	1–1
57	May 24	vs. Maryland		TD Ameritrade Park Omaha; Omaha, Nebraska	10–4	**Henry** (9–5)	Blohm (1–2)	—	—	40–17	2–1
58	May 25	vs. Nebraska		TD Ameritrade Park Omaha; Omaha, Nebraska	18–8	**Weisenburger** (3–0)	Eddins (6–3)	**Beers** (1)	—	41–17	3–1
59	May 25	vs. Nebraska		TD Ameritrade Park Omaha; Omaha, Nebraska	3–7	Palkert (5–3)	**Keizer** (4–1)	Gomes (12)	11,038	41–18	3–2

Corvallis Regional (3–1)
#	Date	Opponent	Rank	Stadium Site	Score	Win	Loss	Save	Attendance	Overall Record	Regional Record
60	May 31	vs. No. 22 Creighton		Goss Stadium; Corvallis, Oregon	6–0	**Kauffmann** (9–6)	Ragan (8–3)	—	3,122	42–18	1–0
61	June 1	vs. Cincinnati		Goss Stadium; Corvallis, Oregon	10–4	**Criswell** (7–1)	Murray (3–2)	—	3,092	43–18	2–1
62	June 2	vs. No. 22 Creighton		Goss Stadium; Corvallis, Oregon	7–11	Kametas (3–0)	**Weisenburger** (3–1)	—	3,078	43–19	2–1
63	June 3	vs. No. 22 Creighton		Goss Stadium; Corvallis, Oregon	17–6	**Beers** (1–1)	Sakowski (7–1)	—	3,058	44–19	3–1

Los Angeles Super Regional (2–1)
#	Date	Opponent	Rank	Stadium Site	Score	Win	Loss	Save	Attendance	Overall Record	Super Reg. Record
64	June 7	vs. No. 1 (1) UCLA		Jackie Robinson Stadium; Los Angeles, California	3–2	**Kauffmann** (10–6)	Garcia (10–1)	**Criswell** (1)	1,904	45–19	1–0
65	June 8	vs. No. 1 (1) UCLA		Jackie Robinson Stadium; Los Angeles, California	4–5 ^{(12)}	Powell (4–3)	**Cleveland** (4–3)	—	1,967	45–20	1–1
66	June 9	vs. No. 1 (1) UCLA		Jackie Robinson Stadium; Los Angeles, California	4–2	**Henry** (10–5)	Mora (3–3)	**Keizer** (2)	2,031	46–20	2–1

College World Series (4–2)
#	Date	Opponent	Rank	Stadium Site	Score	Win	Loss	Save	Attendance	Overall Record	CWS Record
67	June 15	vs. No. 8 Texas Tech		TD Ameritrade Park Omaha; Omaha, Nebraska,	5–3	**Kauffmann** (11–6)	Dallas (7–1)	**Criswell** (2)	24,148	47–20	1–0
68	June 17	vs. Florida State		TD Ameritrade Park Omaha; Omaha, Nebraska	2–0	**Henry** (11–5)	Van Eyk (10–4)	—	23,541	48–20	2–0
69	June 21	vs. No. 8 Texas Tech		TD Ameritrade Park Omaha; Omaha, Nebraska	15–3	**Kauffmann** (12–6)	Dallas (7–2)	**Criswell** (3)	20,944	49–20	3–0
70	June 24	vs. No. 2 Vanderbilt		TD Ameritrade Park Omaha; Omaha, Nebraska	7–4	**Henry** (12–5)	Fellows (13–2)	**Criswell** (4)	24,707	50–20	4–0
71	June 25	vs. No. 2 Vanderbilt		TD Ameritrade Park Omaha; Omaha, Nebraska	1–4	Rocker (12–5)	**Paige** (4–1)	—	25,017	50–21	4–1
72	June 26	vs. No. 2 Vanderbilt		TD Ameritrade Park Omaha; Omaha, Nebraska	2–8	Hickman (9–0)	**Kauffmann** (12–7)	Eder (4)	20,007	50–22	4–2

- Win
- Loss
- Postponement
- Bold: Wolverines team member
- Rankings from D1Baseball.com.
- (#) Tournament seedings in parentheses.

== Rankings ==
Ranking movements Legend: ██ Increase in ranking ██ Decrease in ranking — = Not ranked RV = Received votes т = Tied with team above or below
	Week																		
Poll	Pre	1	2	3	4	5	6	7	8	9	10	11	12	13	14	15	16	17	Final
Coaches'	25	25*		19	25	24	RV	—	—	—	—	—	—	—	—	—	—*	—*	2
Baseball America	20	20	20	18	23	23	—	—	24	—	—	—	23	—	—	—	—*	—*	2
Collegiate Baseball^	39	RV	25	26	RV	30	—	—	27	—	—	22	19	22	—	—	16	8	2
NCBWA†	23	21	18	16	26	22	—	29	25	RV	30	26	24	28т	RV	RV	RV*	RV*	2
D1Baseball	17	17	17	16	RV	24	—	—	—	—	—	—	—	—	—	—	—*	—*	2

^ Collegiate Baseball ranked 40 teams in their preseason poll, but only ranked 30 teams weekly during the season.
† NCBWA ranks 30 teams in their preseason poll, but only ranks 25 teams weekly during the season.
* A new poll was not released for this week, so for comparison purposes, the previous week's ranking is inserted in this week's slot.

== Awards and honors ==
Weekly Awards
Player	Award	Date awarded	Ref.
Tommy Henry	Big Ten Pitcher of the Week; NCBWA National Pitcher of the Week	February 25, 2019	
Tommy Henry	Big Ten Pitcher of the Week	March 4, 2019	
Karl Kauffmann	Big Ten Pitcher of the Week	April 29, 2019	

Individual Awards
Player	Award	Ref.
Jordan Brewer	Big Ten Player of the Year	
Erik Bakich	NCBWA National Coach of the Year	

All-Big Ten
Player	Selection	Ref.
Jordan Brewer	First Team	
Jeff Criswell	First Team	
Jordan Nwogu	First Team	
Jack Blomgren	Second Team	
Joe Donovan	Third Team	
Jimmy Kerr	Third Team	
Jesse Franklin	Third Team	
Karl Kauffmann	Third Team	
Willie Weiss	Freshman Team	

All-American
Player	Selection	Ref.
Jordan Brewer	Third Team	
Karl Kauffmann	Third Team	
Willie Weiss	Freshman Team	
Tommy Henry	Honorable Mention	

== Major League Baseball draft ==
The following Wolverines were selected in the 2019 Major League Baseball draft:

List of Drafted Players
Name	2019 Class	Pos.	Team	Overall
Tommy Henry	Junior	LHP	Arizona Diamondbacks	74th
Karl Kauffmann	Junior	RHP	Colorado Rockies	77th
Jordan Brewer	Junior	OF	Houston Astros	106th
Jack Weisenburger	Junior	RHP	Oakland Athletics	614th
Jimmy Kerr	Senior	INF	Detroit Tigers	982nd
