= 2020 Purdue Fort Wayne Mastodons baseball team =

American college baseball season

2020 Purdue Fort Wayne Mastodons baseball
- Conference: Summit League
- Record: 5–10 (0–0 Summit)
- Head coach: Doug Schreiber (1st season)
- Assistant coach: Gordon Cardenas (1st season)
- Hitting coach: Ken Jones (1st season)
- Pitching coach: Brent McNeil (1st season)
- Home stadium: Mastodon Field

2020 Summit League baseball standings
	Conf.				Overall
Team	W		L	PCT	W		L	PCT
Omaha ‍‍‍	0	–	0	–	10	–	4	.714
North Dakota State ‍‍‍	0	–	0	–	8	–	9	.471
Oral Roberts ‍‍‍	0	–	0	–	6	–	10	.375
Purdue Fort Wayne ‍‍‍	0	–	0	–	5	–	10	.333
South Dakota State ‍‍‍	0	–	0	–	5	–	12	.294
Western Illinois ‍‍‍	0	–	0	–	0	–	13	.000
‡ – Tournament champion As of March 12, 2020; Rankings from D1Baseball

The 2020 Purdue Fort Wayne Mastodons baseball team was a baseball team that represented Purdue University Fort Wayne in the 2020 NCAA Division I baseball season. The Mastodons were members of the Summit League and played their home games at Mastodon Field in Fort Wayne, Indiana. They were led by first-year head coach Doug Schreiber.

The season was cut short in stages by March 12 due to the COVID-19 pandemic.

== Previous season ==
The Mastodons finished the 2019 NCAA Division I baseball season 7–45 overall (2–28 conference) and sixth place in conference standings. Following the conclusion of the regular season, the Mastodons failed to qualify to play in the 2019 NCAA tournament.

== Preseason ==
On July 3, 2019, Bobby Pierce stepped down as the head coach at Purdue Fort Wayne. On July 23, 2019, former Purdue University head coach, Doug Schreiber was named the Mastodons new head coach. On August 28, 2019, Schreiber named Lafayette Aviators manager, Brent McNeil, the team's pitching coach. On October 3, 2019, Schreiber finalized his staff with the hiring of Ken Jones and Gordon Cardenas.

=== Preseason Summit poll ===
For the 2020 poll, Purdue Fort Wayne was projected to finish in sixth in the Conference.

Media poll
Predicted finish	Team	Votes (1st place)
1	Oral Roberts	23 (3)
2	Omaha	19 (1)
3	South Dakota State	18 (2)
4	North Dakota State	16
5	Western Illinois	9
6	Purdue Fort Wayne	5

== Roster ==
2020 Purdue Fort Wayne Mastodons baseball team
Players
Coaches

#	Pos.	Name	B/T	Height	Weight	Year	Previous school	Home town
1	INF	Jacob Lawson	L/R	5 ft 8 in (1.73 m)	160 lb (73 kg)	Fr	La Salle H. S.	Cincinnati, Ohio
2	C	Dylan Stewart	R/R	5 ft 10 in (1.78 m)	160 lb (73 kg)	So	Milford H. S.	Milford, Ohio
3	RHP	Trevor Armstrong	L/R	6 ft 0 in (1.83 m)	170 lb (77 kg)	Jr	Snider H. S.	Fort Wayne, Indiana
5		Garrett Mohler	L/R	6 ft 2 in (1.88 m)	195 lb (88 kg)	RS Sr	New Haven H. S.	New Haven, Indiana
6	OF	Ryan Mollette	L/L	5 ft 8 in (1.73 m)	150 lb (68 kg)	Fr	Newton H. S.	Ludlow Falls, Ohio
7	OF	Drew Reich	R/R	6 ft 2 in (1.88 m)	205 lb (93 kg)	RS Sr	Charlestown Senior H. S.	Charlestown, Indiana
8	INF	Trenton Stoner	R/R	6 ft 0 in (1.83 m)	185 lb (84 kg)	Jr	Clay H. S.	Granger, Indiana
9	RHP	Chase Phelps	R/R	6 ft 0 in (1.83 m)	195 lb (88 kg)	RS Sr	Snider H. S.	Fort Wayne, Indiana
10	INF	Jack Lang	R/R	6 ft 0 in (1.83 m)	185 lb (84 kg)	Jr	Hamilton Southeastern H. S.	Fishers, Indiana
11	OF	Evan Huffman	R/R	6 ft 1 in (1.85 m)	185 lb (84 kg)	Jr	Ivy Tech Community College	Warren, Indiana
12	INF	Brian Erbe	R/R	6 ft 1 in (1.85 m)	185 lb (84 kg)	RS Fr	Oakwood H. S.	Dayton, Ohio
13	INF	Aaron Chapman	R/R	6 ft 0 in (1.83 m)	190 lb (86 kg)	So	Waterford Union H. S.	Waterford, Wisconsin
14	RHP	Brian Skelton	R/R	6 ft 2 in (1.88 m)	205 lb (93 kg)	Jr	Westfield H. S.	Westfield, Indiana
15		Charles Lyons	R/R	5 ft 8 in (1.73 m)	160 lb (73 kg)	RS Fr	Southfield A&T H. S.	Southfield, Michigan
16		Garett Lake	L/L	6 ft 0 in (1.83 m)	200 lb (91 kg)	Jr	Pima Community College	Henderson, Nevada
17	INF	Travis Upp	L/R	6 ft 2 in (1.88 m)	200 lb (91 kg)	Sr	LaPorte H. S.	LaPorte, Indiana
18	LHP	Justin Miller	L/L	5 ft 9 in (1.75 m)	180 lb (82 kg)	So	Homestead H. S.	Roanoke, Indiana
19	C	Jalen Hammond	R/R	5 ft 11 in (1.8 m)	170 lb (77 kg)	Fr	Adams Central H. S.	Monroe, Indiana
20	RHP	Cameron Boyd	R/R	6 ft 3 in (1.91 m)	195 lb (88 kg)	Sr	Fishers H. S.	Fishers, Indiana
21		Luke Miles	R/R	6 ft 1 in (1.85 m)	195 lb (88 kg)	Fr	Franklin Community H. S.	Morgantown, Indiana
22	OF	Lucas Kolovitz	L/R	6 ft 1 in (1.85 m)	200 lb (91 kg)	Fr	Fenwick H. S.	Oak Park, Illinois
23	RHP	Michael Madura	R/R	6 ft 6 in (1.98 m)	190 lb (86 kg)	RS So	South Suburban College	Munster, Indiana
24	OF	Robert Young III	R/R	6 ft 2 in (1.88 m)	208 lb (94 kg)	RS Sr	North Central H. S.	Indianapolis, Indiana
25	RHP	Cade Willard	R/R	6 ft 1 in (1.85 m)	195 lb (88 kg)	RS So	Eastside H. S.	Butler, Indiana
26	RHP	William Wentz	R/R	6 ft 2 in (1.88 m)	180 lb (82 kg)	Jr	Kankakee Community College	Indianapolis, Indiana
27	RHP	Owen Pyatt	R/R	6 ft 1 in (1.85 m)	190 lb (86 kg)	Sr	Jefferson College	St. Louis, Missouri
28		Alex Evenson	L/L	6 ft 1 in (1.85 m)	175 lb (79 kg)	Jr	Century College	Minnetonka, Minnesota
32	C	Alec Brunson	R/R	6 ft 2 in (1.88 m)	200 lb (91 kg)	So	DeKalb H. S.	Auburn, Indiana
33	RHP	Nathan Hefle	R/R	6 ft 0 in (1.83 m)	200 lb (91 kg)	Jr	Germantown H. S.	Germantown, Wisconsin
35	RHP	Sean Ferguson	R/R	6 ft 4 in (1.93 m)	215 lb (98 kg)	Jr	Parkland College	New Haven, Indiana
37	RHP	Tyler Kissinger	R/R	6 ft 3 in (1.91 m)	215 lb (98 kg)	RS Sr	Florence–Darlington Technical College	Fort Wayne, Indiana
38	INF	Andrew Lawvere	R/R	5 ft 10 in (1.78 m)	210 lb (95 kg)	RS Jr	Eastbrook H. S.	Upland, Indiana

Head coach

Doug Schreiber

Assistant coach(es)

Hitting coach(es)

Ken Jones

Base coach(es)

Gordon Cardenas

Pitching coach(es)

Brent McNeil

Legend

- (C) Team captain
- (S) Suspended
- (I) Ineligible
- Injured
- Current redshirt

Roster
Last update: March 8, 2019

== Schedule ==
2020 Purdue Fort Wayne Mastodons baseball game log
Regular season
February (3–7)

#	Date	Opponent	Site/stadium	Score	Win	Loss	Save	Attendance	Overall record	Summit record
1	February 14	at Longwood	Bolding Stadium • Farmville, Virginia,	10–8	Boyd (1–0)	Berrier (0–1)	Ferguson (1)	283	1–0	–
2	February 15	at Longwood	Bolding Stadium • Farmville, Virginia	8–3	Phelps (1–0)	D'Ercole (0–1)	None	108	2–0	–
3	February 15	at Longwood	Bolding Stadium • Farmville, Virginia	11–0	Kissinger (1–0)	Potojecki (0–1)	None	108	3–0	–
4	February 16	at Longwood	Bolding Stadium • Farmville, Virginia	8–11	Gregory (1–0)	Miller (0–1)	Fuchs (1)	278	3–1	–
5	February 21	at Miami (OH)	Hayden Park • Oxford, Ohio,	2–6	Bachman (1–1)	Boyd (1–1)	None	108	3–2	–
6	February 22	at Miami (OH)	Hayden Park • Oxford, Ohio	3–7	Bosma (1–1)	Phelps (1–1)	Webb (1)	209	3–3	–
7	February 23	at Miami (OH)	Hayden Park • Oxford, Ohio	8–18	Schmitt (1–0)	Kissinger (1–1)	None	180	3–4	–
8	February 28	at New Mexico State	Presley Askew Field • Las Cruces, New Mexico	2–4	Hroch (2–0)	Boyd (1–2)	Allen (1)	1,046	3–5	–
9	February 29	at New Mexico State	Presley Askew Field • Las Cruces, New Mexico	5–19	Fernandez (1–0)	Phelps (1–2)	Dickson Jr. (1)	723	3–6	–
10	February 29	at New Mexico State	Presley Askew Field • Las Cruces, New Mexico	5–14	Barraza (1–0)	Kissinger (1–2)	None	735	3–7	–

March (2–3)

#	Date	Opponent	Site/stadium	Score	Win	Loss	Save	Attendance	Overall record	Summit record
11	March 1	at New Mexico State	Presley Askew Field • Las Cruces, New Mexico	9–10	Reyes (2–1)	Lawvere (0–1)	None	622	3–8	–
12	March 6	vs Richmond	Shipyard Park • Charleston, South Carolina,	4–13	Miller (2–0)	Kissinger (1–3)	None	102	3–9	–
13	March 7	vs Longwood	Shipyard Park • Charleston, South Carolina	9–4	Boyd (2–2)	Gregory (1–2)	Phelps (1)	123	4–9	–
14	March 8	vs Sacred Heart	Shipyard Park • Charleston, South Carolina	8–7	Miller (1–1)	Kramer (0–2)	Evenson (1)	132	5–9	–
15	March 10	at Ball State	Ball Diamond • Muncie, Indiana	4–9	Ruetschle (1–0)	Phelps (1–3)	Schweitzer (1)	268	5–10	–
16	March 13	at Western Illinois	Alfred D. Boyer Stadium • Macomb, Illinois,	Canceled (COVID-19 pandemic)						
17	March 14	at Western Illinois	Alfred D. Boyer Stadium • Macomb, Illinois	Canceled (COVID-19 pandemic)						
18	March 15	at Western Illinois	Alfred D. Boyer Stadium • Macomb, Illinois	Canceled (COVID-19 pandemic)						
19	March 18	at Ball State	Ball Diamond • Muncie, Indiana	Canceled (COVID-19 pandemic)						
20	March 20	at Omaha	J. J. Isaacson Field at Seymour Smith Park • Omaha, Nebraska,	–	–	–	–	–	–	–
21	March 21	at Omaha	J. J. Isaacson Field at Seymour Smith Park • Omaha, Nebraska	–	–	–	–	–	–	–
22	March 22	at Omaha	J. J. Isaacson Field at Seymour Smith Park • Omaha, Nebraska	–	–	–	–	–	–	–
23	March 24	at Purdue	Alexander Field • West Lafayette, Indiana	Canceled (COVID-19 pandemic)						
24	March 27	North Dakota State	Mastodon Field • Fort Wayne, Indiana	Canceled (COVID-19 pandemic)						
25	March 28	North Dakota State	Mastodon Field • Fort Wayne, Indiana	Canceled (COVID-19 pandemic)						
26	March 29	North Dakota State	Mastodon Field • Fort Wayne, Indiana	Canceled (COVID-19 pandemic)						
27	March 31	Goshen	Mastodon Field • Fort Wayne, Indiana	Canceled (COVID-19 pandemic)						

April (0–0)

#	Date	Opponent	Site/stadium	Score	Win	Loss	Save	Attendance	Overall record	Summit record
28	April 1	at Dayton	Woerner Field • Dayton, Ohio,	Canceled (COVID-19 pandemic)						
29	April 3	Western Illinois	Mastodon Field • Fort Wayne, Indiana	Canceled (COVID-19 pandemic)						
30	April 4	Western Illinois	Mastodon Field • Fort Wayne, Indiana	Canceled (COVID-19 pandemic)						
31	April 5	Western Illinois	Mastodon Field • Fort Wayne, Indiana	Canceled (COVID-19 pandemic)						
32	April 7	Toledo	Mastodon Field • Fort Wayne, Indiana	Canceled (COVID-19 pandemic)						
33	April 10	South Dakota State	Mastodon Field • Fort Wayne, Indiana	Canceled (COVID-19 pandemic)						
34	April 11	South Dakota State	Mastodon Field • Fort Wayne, Indiana	Canceled (COVID-19 pandemic)						
35	April 12	South Dakota State	Mastodon Field • Fort Wayne, Indiana	Canceled (COVID-19 pandemic)						
36	April 15	at Toledo	Scott Park Baseball Complex • Toledo, Ohio,	Canceled (COVID-19 pandemic)						
37	April 17	at Oral Roberts	J. L. Johnson Stadium • Tulsa, Oklahoma	Canceled (COVID-19 pandemic)						
38	April 18	at Oral Roberts	J. L. Johnson Stadium • Tulsa, Oklahoma	Canceled (COVID-19 pandemic)						
39	April 19	at Oral Roberts	J. L. Johnson Stadium • Tulsa, Oklahoma	Canceled (COVID-19 pandemic)						
40	April 22	Bowling Green	Mastodon Field • Fort Wayne, Indiana	Canceled (COVID-19 pandemic)						
41	April 24	at North Dakota State	Newman Outdoor Field • Fargo, North Dakota	Canceled (COVID-19 pandemic)						
42	April 25	at North Dakota State	Newman Outdoor Field • Fargo, North Dakota	Canceled (COVID-19 pandemic)						
43	April 26	at North Dakota State	Newman Outdoor Field • Fargo, North Dakota	Canceled (COVID-19 pandemic)						
44	April 28	at Bowling Green	Steller Field • Bowling Green, Ohio,	Canceled (COVID-19 pandemic)						

May (0–0)

#	Date	Opponent	Site/stadium	Score	Win	Loss	Save	Attendance	Overall record	Summit record
45	May 1	Omaha	Mastodon Field • Fort Wayne, Indiana	Canceled (COVID-19 pandemic)						
46	May 2	Omaha	Mastodon Field • Fort Wayne, Indiana	Canceled (COVID-19 pandemic)						
47	May 3	Omaha	Mastodon Field • Fort Wayne, Indiana	Canceled (COVID-19 pandemic)						
48	May 8	Oral Roberts	Mastodon Field • Fort Wayne, Indiana	Canceled (COVID-19 pandemic)						
49	May 9	Oral Roberts	Mastodon Field • Fort Wayne, Indiana	Canceled (COVID-19 pandemic)						
50	May 10	Oral Roberts	Mastodon Field • Fort Wayne, Indiana	Canceled (COVID-19 pandemic)						
51	May 12	Dayton	Mastodon Field • Fort Wayne, Indiana	Canceled (COVID-19 pandemic)						
52	May 14	at South Dakota State	Erv Huether Field • Brookings, South Dakota	Canceled (COVID-19 pandemic)						
53	May 15	at South Dakota State	Erv Huether Field • Brookings, South Dakota	Canceled (COVID-19 pandemic)						
54	May 16	at South Dakota State	Erv Huether Field • Brookings, South Dakota	Canceled (COVID-19 pandemic)						

== Awards and honors ==
=== Weekly awards ===
Weekly Awards
Player	Award	Date awarded	Ref.
Jack Lang	Summit Player of the Week	February 17, 2020	
Tyler Kissinger	Summit Pitcher of the Week	February 17, 2020	

== See also ==
- 2020 NCAA Division I baseball tournament
