= 2020 Indiana Hoosiers baseball team =

American college baseball season

2020 Indiana Hoosiers baseball
- Conference: Big Ten Conference
- Record: 9–6 (0–0 Big Ten)
- Head coach: Jeff Mercer (2nd season)
- Pitching coach: Justin Parker (2nd season)
- Home stadium: Bart Kaufman Field (Capacity: 2,500)

2020 Big Ten Conference baseball standings
	Conf.				Overall
Team	W		L	PCT	W		L	PCT
Iowa ‍‍‍	0	–	0	–	10	–	5	.667
Maryland ‍‍‍	0	–	0	–	10	–	5	.667
Penn State ‍‍‍	0	–	0	–	10	–	5	.667
Illinois ‍‍‍	0	–	0	–	8	–	5	.615
Indiana ‍‍‍	0	–	0	–	9	–	6	.600
Michigan State ‍‍‍	0	–	0	–	9	–	6	.600
Michigan ‍‍‍	0	–	0	–	8	–	7	.533
Purdue ‍‍‍	0	–	0	–	7	–	7	.500
Northwestern ‍‍‍	0	–	0	–	6	–	6	.500
Nebraska ‍‍‍	0	–	0	–	7	–	8	.467
Minnesota ‍‍‍	0	–	0	–	8	–	10	.444
Ohio State ‍‍‍	0	–	0	–	6	–	8	.429
Rutgers ‍‍‍	0	–	0	–	6	–	9	.400
‡ – Tournament champion As of March 12, 2020; Rankings from D1Baseball

The 2020 Indiana Hoosiers baseball team are a college baseball team that represented Indiana University in the 2020 NCAA Division I baseball season. The Hoosiers are members of the Big Ten Conference (B1G) and play their home games at Bart Kaufman Field in Bloomington, Indiana. They are led by second-year head coach Jeff Mercer. On March 12, 2020, the Big Ten Conference cancelled the remainder of all winter and spring sports seasons due to the COVID-19 pandemic.

== Previous season ==
The Hoosiers finished the 2019 NCAA Division I baseball season 37–23 overall (17–7 conference) and first place in conference standings. Following the conclusion of the regular season, the Hoosiers were selected to play in the 2019 NCAA tournament, beginning in the Louisville Regional. The Hoosiers would eventually lose in the semifinal round of the Louisville Regional to College World Series semifinalist Louisville by a score of 7–9.

=== MLB draft ===
The following Hoosiers on the 2019 roster were selected in the 2019 Major League Baseball draft:

List of Drafted Players
Name	2019 Class	Pos.	Team	Round	Signed/Returned
Matt Gorski	Junior	OF	Pittsburgh Pirates	2nd	Signed
Andrew Saalfrank	Junior	LHP	Arizona Diamondbacks	6th	Signed
Tanner Gordon	Junior	RHP	Atlanta Braves	6th	Signed
Matt Lloyd	Senior	INF	Cincinnati Reds	15th	Signed*
Pauly Milto	Senior	RHP	Chicago White Sox	23rd	Signed*
Scotty Bradley	Junior	INF	Toronto Blue Jays	36th	Signed
Cam Beauchamp	Sophomore	LHP	Philadelphia Phillies	36th	Signed
Cole Barr	Junior	INF	Seattle Mariners	37th	Returned
Elijah Dunham	Junior	OF	Pittsburgh Pirates	40th	Returned
Cade Bunnell	Senior	INF	Atlanta Braves	40th	Signed*

* indicates draftee had no more college eligibility

== Preseason ==
On September 5, 2019, the Hoosiers announced the hiring of Derek Simmons as the team's newest assistant coach.

On October 10, 2019, Indiana's head coach Jeff Mercer announced two title changes to existing coaches; Justin Parker transitioned to Associate head coach/Pitching, while Denton Sagerman was moved to Director of Operations/Pitching Development.

=== Season projections ===
Coming off of an NCAA Regional appearance in 2019, the 2020 Hoosiers are projected to finish fourth in conference play by D1Baseball and Baseball America, while Indiana is predicted to finish fifth by B1G coaches. The Hoosiers received votes for rankings in other major preseason polls, to include NCBWA, USA Today Coaches and Collegiate Baseball.

== Roster ==
2020 Indiana Hoosiers baseball team
Players
Coaches

#	Pos.	Name	B/T	Height	Weight	Year	Previous school	Home town
1	INF	Jeremy Houston	R/R	5 ft 8 in (1.73 m)	177 lb (80 kg)	Sr	Mount Carmel	Chicago, Illinois
2	INF	Cole Barr	R/R	5 ft 11 in (1.8 m)	191 lb (87 kg)	Jr	Yorktown	Yorktown, Indiana
3	INF	Drew Ashley	R/R	5 ft 11 in (1.8 m)	170 lb (77 kg)	Jr	Evansville Memorial	Chandler, Indiana
6	OF	Grant Richardson	L/L	6 ft 2 in (1.88 m)	186 lb (84 kg)	So	Fishers	Fishers, Indiana
7	OF	Ethan Vecrumba	L/R	6 ft 4 in (1.93 m)	205 lb (93 kg)	Fr	Edgewood	Bloomington, Indiana
9	RHP	Alex Franklin	R/R	6 ft 3 in (1.91 m)	200 lb (91 kg)	So	Bloomington South	Bloomington, Indiana
13	RHP	Cal Krueger	R/R	6 ft 0 in (1.83 m)	193 lb (88 kg)	Sr	Jasper	Jasper, Indiana
17	OF	Elijah Dunham	L/L	6 ft 0 in (1.83 m)	213 lb (97 kg)	Jr	FJ Reitz	Evansville, Indiana
18	LHP	Scott Braden	/	6 ft 3 in (1.91 m)	200 lb (91 kg)	Sr	Shakamak	Jasonville, Indiana
19	LHP	Tommy Sommer	L/L	6 ft 4 in (1.93 m)	207 lb (94 kg)	Jr	Carmel	Carmel, Indiana
25	RHP	Connor Manous	R/R	6 ft 0 in (1.83 m)	181 lb (82 kg)	RS Jr	Munster	Munster, Indiana
32	OF	Tyler Van Pelt	L/R	5 ft 11 in (1.8 m)	185 lb (84 kg)	So	Bloomington South	Bloomington, Indiana
34	RHP	Braydon Tucker	L/R	6 ft 4 in (1.93 m)	215 lb (98 kg)	So	Northview	Brazil, Indiana
35	RHP	Matt Litwicki	R/R	6 ft 1 in (1.85 m)	201 lb (91 kg)	So	Lake Central	Dyer, Indiana
37	RHP	Gabe Bierman	R/R	6 ft 2 in (1.88 m)	170 lb (77 kg)	So	Jeffersonville	Jeffersonville, Indiana
38	INF	Jake Skrine	R/R	6 ft 2 in (1.88 m)	200 lb (91 kg)	So	Mead	Longmont, Colorado
42	RHP	Grant Sloan	R/R	6 ft 5 in (1.96 m)	215 lb (98 kg)	RS Sr	Zionsville	Zionsville, Indiana
51	RHP	McCade Brown	R/R	6 ft 6 in (1.98 m)	200 lb (91 kg)	So	Normal West	Normal, Illinois

Head coach

Jeff Mercer

Assistant coach(es)

Derek Simmons
Dan Held

Pitching coach(es)

Justin Parker

Legend

- (C) Team captain
- (S) Suspended
- (I) Ineligible
- Injured
- Current redshirt

Roster
Last update: February 6, 2020

== Schedule ==
Legend
Indiana win
Indiana loss
Postponement

2020 Indiana Hoosiers baseball game log
Regular season
February (6–3)

#	Date	Opponent	Rank	Venue	Score	Attendance	Overall Record	B1G Record
1	February 14	at No. 11 LSU		Alex Box Stadium, Skip Bertman Field • Baton Rouge, Louisiana	1–8	11,421	0–1	–
2	February 15	at No. 11 LSU		Alex Box Stadium, Skip Bertman Field • Baton Rouge, Louisiana	4–7	10,859	0–2	–
3	February 15	at No. 11 LSU		Alex Box Stadium, Skip Bertman Field • Baton Rouge, Louisiana	7–2	10,508	1–2	–
4	February 21	vs UT Martin		Mobile, Alabama (South Alabama Tournament)	3–2	1,304	2–2	–
5	February 22	vs No. 30 South Alabama		Mobile, Alabama (South Alabama Tournament)	4–2	1,318	3–2	–
6	February 23	vs Siena		Mobile, Alabama (South Alabama Tournament)	12–3	1,250	4–2	–
7	February 26	Butler		Bart Kaufman Field • Bloomington, Indiana	Cancelled		4–2	–
8	February 28	vs No. 17 East Carolina		Greenville, North Carolina (Keith LeClaire Classic)	11–5	3,275	5–2	–
9	February 29	vs High Point		Greenville, North Carolina (Keith LeClaire Classic)	5–1	-	6–2	–

March (2–4)

#	Date	Opponent	Rank	Venue	Score	Attendance	Overall Record	B1G Record
10	March 1	vs No. 13 Ole Miss		Greenville, North Carolina (Keith LeClaire Classic)	5–9	-	6–3	–
11	March 4	Purdue		Bart Kaufman Field • Bloomington, Indiana	17–2	1,668	7–3	–
	March 6	San Diego		Bart Kaufman Field • Bloomington, Indiana	Cancelled		–	–
12	March 7	San Diego		Bart Kaufman Field • Bloomington, Indiana	9–2	1,875	8–3	–
13	March 7	San Diego		Bart Kaufman Field • Bloomington, Indiana	2–6	1,875	8–4	–
14	March 8	San Diego		Bart Kaufman Field • Bloomington, Indiana	5–13	1,818	8–5	–
15	March 10	at Evansville		Charles H. Braun Stadium • Evansville, Indiana	4–5	1,067	8–6	–
16	March 11	Cincinnati		Bart Kaufman Field • Bloomington, Indiana	6–2	1,234	9–6	–
17	March 13	Memphis		Bart Kaufman Field • Bloomington, Indiana	–		–	–
18	March 14	Memphis		Bart Kaufman Field • Bloomington, Indiana	–		–	–
19	March 15	Memphis		Bart Kaufman Field • Bloomington, Indiana	–		–	–
20	March 17	Kentucky		Bart Kaufman Field • Bloomington, Indiana	–		–	–
21	March 20	Illinois State		Bart Kaufman Field • Bloomington, Indiana	–		–	–
22	March 21	Illinois State		Bart Kaufman Field • Bloomington, Indiana	–		–	–
23	March 22	Illinois State		Bart Kaufman Field • Bloomington, Indiana	–		–	–
24	March 27	Ohio State		Bart Kaufman Field • Bloomington, Indiana	–		–	–
25	March 28	Ohio State		Bart Kaufman Field • Bloomington, Indiana	–		–	–
26	March 29	Ohio State		Bart Kaufman Field • Bloomington, Indiana	–		–	–
27	March 31	at Ball State		Ball Diamond • Muncie, Indiana	–		–	–

April

#	Date	Opponent	Rank	Venue	Score	Overall Record	B1G Record
28	April 3	at Penn State		Medlar Field • University Park, Pennsylvania	–	–	–
29	April 4	at Penn State		Medlar Field • University Park, Pennsylvania	–	–	–
30	April 5	at Penn State		Medlar Field • University Park, Pennsylvania	–	–	–
31	April 7	Indiana State		Bart Kaufman Field • Bloomington, Indiana	–	–	–
32	April 10	at Northwestern		Rocky Miller Park • Evanston, Illinois	–	–	–
33	April 11	at Northwestern		Rocky Miller Park • Evanston, Illinois	–	–	–
34	April 12	at Northwestern		Rocky Miller Park • Evanston, Illinois	–	–	–
35	April 15	Ball State		Bart Kaufman Field • Bloomington, Indiana	–	–	–
36	April 17	Michigan State		Bart Kaufman Field • Bloomington, Indiana	–	–	–
37	April 18	Michigan State		Bart Kaufman Field • Bloomington, Indiana	–	–	–
38	April 19	Michigan State		Bart Kaufman Field • Bloomington, Indiana	–	–	–
39	April 21	at Indiana State		Bob Warn Field at Sycamore Stadium • Terre Haute, Indiana	–	–	–
40	April 24	at Rutgers		Bainton Field • Piscataway, New Jersey	–	–	–
41	April 25	at Rutgers		Bainton Field • Piscataway, New Jersey	–	–	–
42	April 26	at Rutgers		Bainton Field • Piscataway, New Jersey	–	–	–
43	April 28	vs Notre Dame		Victory Field • Indianapolis, Indiana	–	–	–

"#" represents ranking. All rankings from Collegiate Baseball on the date of the contest.
"()" represents postseason seeding in the Big 10 Tournament or NCAA Regional, respectively.
Schedule Source

On March 12, it was announced that the remainder of the 2020 season would be cancelled, due to the COVID-19 pandemic.

== Ranking movements ==
Ranking movements Legend: ██ Increase in ranking ██ Decrease in ranking — = Not ranked RV = Received votes
	Week																			
Poll	Pre	1	2	3	4	5	6	7	8	9	10	11	12	13	14	15	16	17	18	Final
Coaches'	RV	RV*	—	RV																
Baseball America	—	—	—	—																
Collegiate Baseball^	RV	—	—	—																
NCBWA†	RV	—	—	RV																
D1Baseball	—	—	—	—																

^ Collegiate Baseball ranked 40 teams in their preseason poll, but only ranked 30 teams weekly during the season.
† NCBWA ranks 30 teams in their preseason poll, but only ranks 25 teams weekly during the season.
* A new poll was not released for this week, so for comparison purposes, the previous week's ranking is inserted in this week's slot.

== Awards and honors ==
=== Pre-season awards / Watch list ===
Awards
Player	Award	Date Awarded	Ref.
Cole Barr	Big Ten Preseason Honors	February 12, 2020	
Elijah Dunham	Big Ten Preseason Honors	February 12, 2020	
Tommy Sommer	Big Ten Preseason Honors	February 12, 2020	

=== Regular season awards / Watch lists ===
Weekly Awards
Player	Award	Date Awarded	Ref.
Grant Richardson	Big Ten Co-Player of the Week	February 17, 2020	
Elijah Dunham	Big Ten Player of the Week	February 24, 2020	
