= 2019 Texas Tech Red Raiders baseball team =

American college baseball season

2019 Texas Tech Red Raiders baseball

Big 12 Regular season Champions NCAA Lubbock Regional champions NCAA Lubbock Super Regional champions

College World Series, 2–2
- Conference: Big 12 Conference

Ranking
- Coaches: No. 5
- CB: No. 4
- Record: 46–20 (16–8 Big 12)
- Head coach: Tim Tadlock (7th season)
- Assistant coaches: J-Bob Thomas (7th season); Matt Gardner (7th season); Eric Gutierrez (1st season)
- Home stadium: Dan Law Field at Rip Griffin Park

2019 Big 12 Conference baseball standings
	Conf.				Overall
Team	W		L	PCT	W		L	PCT
No. 4 Texas Tech ‍†‍‍^{y}	16	–	8	.667	46	–	20	.697
No. 23 Baylor ‍‍‍^{y}	14	–	8	.636	35	–	19	.648
No. 11 Oklahoma State ‍‍‡‍^{y}	14	–	9	.609	40	–	21	.656
No. 27 West Virginia ‍‍‍^{y}	13	–	11	.542	38	–	22	.633
Kansas ‍‍‍	12	–	12	.500	32	–	26	.552
TCU ‍‍‍^{y}	11	–	13	.458	34	–	28	.548
Oklahoma ‍‍‍	11	–	13	.458	33	–	23	.589
Kansas State ‍‍‍	8	–	16	.333	25	–	33	.431
Texas ‍‍‍	7	–	16	.304	27	–	27	.500
† – Conference champion ‡ – Tournament champion y – Invited to the NCAA tournament Rankings from Collegiate Baseball

The 2019 Texas Tech Red Raiders baseball team represented Texas Tech University during the 2019 NCAA Division I baseball season. The Red Raiders played their home games at Dan Law Field at Rip Griffin Park as a member of the Big 12 Conference. The team was led by 7th year head coach Tim Tadlock.

== Previous season ==
The 2018 team finished the regular season with a 38–15 (15–9) record, finishing in 3rd place in the Big 12. The Red Raiders were eliminated from the Conference tournament in game 3 after a 4–12 loss to West Virginia. For the NCAA tournament, the team defeated New Mexico and Louisville in the Lubbock Regional, then defeated Duke in game 3 of the Lubbock Super Regional and advanced to the College World Series. The Red Raiders defeated Florida in game 1, then lost to Arkansas in game 2 before being eliminated by Florida in game 3.

== Roster ==
2019 Texas Tech Red Raiders roster
Pitchers: 8 – Kurt Wilson (RHP) – Sophomore; 10 – Mason Montgomery (LHP) – Freshman; 13 – Cade Farr (LHP) – Freshman; 14 – Jake McDonald (RHP) – Junior; 17 – John McMillon (RHP) – Junior; 21 – Erikson Lanning (LHP) – Senior; 25 – Connor Queen (RHP) – Junior; 28 – Taylor Floyd (RHP) – Junior; 29 – Clayton Beeter (RHP) – (redshirt) Freshman; 30 – Trey Garlett (RHP) – Freshman; 31 – Caleb Freeman (RHP) – Junior; 32 – Caleb Kilian (RHP) – Junior; 33 – Dane Haveman (LHP) – Junior; 34 – Micah Dallas (RHP) – Freshman; 40 – Bryce Bonnin (RHP) – Sophomore; 42 – Hunter Dobbins (RHP) – Freshman; 47 – Carson Carter (RHP) – (redshirt) Sophomore; 48 - Ryan Keesee (LHP) -; Junior: 49 – Ryan Sublette (RHP) – Sophomore	Catchers: 1 – Mason Minzey – Freshman; 18 – Cole Stilwell – Freshman; 26 – Braxton Fulord – Sophomore; 36 – Doug Facendo – Junior; Infielders: 3 – T. J. Rumfield – Freshman; 4 – Dru Baker – Freshman; 5 – Brian Klein – Junior; 11 – Cameron Warren – Senior; 15 – Parker Kelley – Sophomore; 16 – Josh Jung – Junior; 19 – Easton Murrell – Sophomore	Outfielders: 2 – Gabe Holt – Sophomore; 7 – Cody Masters – Sophomore; 9 – Dylan Neuse – Sophomore; 17 – John McMillon – Junior; 20 – Max Marusak – Freshman

== Schedule and results ==
2019 Texas Tech Red Raiders baseball game log: 46–20
Regular season: 36–15

February: 6–1
Date	Time	Opponent	Rank	Site/stadium	Score	Win	Loss	Save	Attendance	Overall record	Big 12 Record	Ref
February 15	2:00 PM	Oregon	#3	Dan Law Field at Rip Griffin Park • Lubbock, TX	4–9	Ahlstrom (1–0)	**Kilian** (0–1)	—	4,432	0–1	—	
February 16	12:00 PM	Oregon	#3	Dan Law Field at Rip Griffin Park • Lubbock, TX	12–11	**Floyd** (1–0)	Somers (0–1)	**Beeter** (1)	4,342	1–1	—	
February 17	4:00 PM	Oregon	#3	Dan Law Field at Rip Griffin Park • Lubbock, TX	6–4	**Queen** (1–0)	Ahlstrom (1–1)	**McMillon** (1)	3,991	2–1	—	
February 18	1:00 PM	Oregon	#3	Dan Law Field at Rip Griffin Park • Lubbock, TX	**Cancelled**							
February 22	6:30 PM	Kentucky	#3	Dan Law Field at Rip Griffin Park • Lubbock, TX	7–4	**Queen** (2–0)	Coleman (2–1)	**Floyd** (1)	3,504	3–1	—	
February 23	2:00 PM	Kentucky	#3	Dan Law Field at Rip Griffin Park • Lubbock, TX	10–7	**Dobbins** (1–0)	Hazelwood (0–1)	**Beeter** (2)	3,629	4–1	—	
February 24	1:00 PM	Kentucky	#3	Dan Law Field at Rip Griffin Park • Lubbock, TX	19–4	**Montgomery** (1–0)	Marsh (0–1)	—	3,686	5–1	—	
February 26	2:00 PM	New Mexico State	#3	Dan Law Field at Rip Griffin Park • Lubbock, TX	7–0	**Bonnin** (1–0)	Fernandez (0–1)	—	3,273	6–1	—	

March: 12–6
Date	Time	Opponent	Rank	Site/stadium	Score	Win	Loss	Save	Attendance	Overall record	Big 12 Record	Ref
March 1	7:00 PM	vs. Nebraska; Frisco Classic	#3	Dr Pepper Ballpark • Frisco, TX	1–2	Luensmann (1–1)	**Floyd** (1–1)	Gomes (1)	7,400	6–2	—	
March 2	6:00 PM	vs. #12 Mississippi State; Frisco Classic	#3	Dr Pepper Ballpark • Frisco, TX	2–4	Ginn (3–0)	**Kilian** (0–2)	Gordon (3)	7,527	6–3	—	
March 3	3:00 PM	vs. Sam Houston State; Frisco Classic	#3	Dr Pepper Ballpark • Frisco, TX	**Cancelled**							
March 5	8:00 PM	@ San Diego State	#14	Tony Gwynn Stadium • San Diego, CA	5–1	**Dallas** (1–0)	O'Sulivan (2–2)	—	405	7–3	—	
March 6	4:00 PM	@ San Diego State	#14	Tony Gwynn Stadium • San Diego, CA	12–9	**Floyd** (2–1)	Escobedo (0–1)	**Dobbins** (1)	169	8–3	—	
March 8	6:30 PM	Wichita State	#14	Dan Law Field at Rip Griffin Park • Lubbock, TX	12–2	**Haveman** (1–0)	Snavely (1–2)	—	3,587	9–3	—	
March 9	2:00 PM	Wichita State	#14	Dan Law Field at Rip Griffin Park • Lubbock, TX	15–10	**Freeman** (1–0)	Carver (2–1)	—	3,562	10–3	—	
March 10	1:00 PM	Wichita State	#14	Dan Law Field at Rip Griffin Park • Lubbock, TX	15–4	**Montgomery** (2–0)	Eddy (2–2)	—	3,367	11–3	—	
March 15	6:30 PM	@ #12 Texas	#11	UFCU Disch–Falk Field • Austin, TX	3–4	Madden (3–0)	**Haveman** (1–1)	Fields (2)	7,460	11–4	0–1	
March 16	2:30 PM	@ #12 Texas	#11	UFCU Disch–Falk Field • Austin, TX	3–0	**Kilian** (1–2)	Henley (2–1)	**Beeter** (3)	7,879	12–4	1–1	
March 17	1:00 PM	@ #12 Texas	#11	UFCU Disch–Falk Field • Austin, TX	3–4	Bryant (1–1)	**McMillon** (0–1)	Kubichek (1)	7,390	12–5	1–2	
March 21	6:30 PM	#24 Michigan	#19	Dan Law Field at Rip Griffin Park • Lubbock, TX	11–2	**Dallas** (2–0)	Henry (5–1)	—	3,334	13–5	—	
March 22	6:30 PM	#24 Michigan	#19	Dan Law Field at Rip Griffin Park • Lubbock, TX	10–3	**Kilian** (2–2)	Kauffmann (4–2)	—	3,302	14–5	—	
March 23	4:00 PM	#24 Michigan	#19	Dan Law Field at Rip Griffin Park • Lubbock, TX	8–5	**Freeman** (2–0)	Cleveland (1–1)	**Beeter** (4)	4,432	15–5	—	
March 24	2:00 PM	Stetson	#19	Dan Law Field at Rip Griffin Park • Lubbock, TX	5–7 (10)	Gonzalez (3–0)	**Beeter** (0–1)	—	3,408	15–6	—	
March 25	12:00 PM	Stetson	#18	Dan Law Field at Rip Griffin Park • Lubbock, TX	5–4	**Bonnin** (2–0)	Neilan (1–2)	**Sublette** (1)	3,116	16–6	—	
March 30 (1)	2:00 PM	@ Kansas State	#18	Tointon Family Stadium • Manhattan, KS	11–4	**Dallas** (3–0)	Passino (1–3)	—	1,367	17–6	2–2	
March 30 (2)	5:31 PM	@ Kansas State	#18	Tointon Family Stadium • Manhattan, KS	4–3	**Kilian** (3–2)	Wicks (3–1)	**Beeter** (5)	1,367	18–6	3–2	
March 31	1:00 PM	@ Kansas State	#18	Tointon Family Stadium • Manhattan, KS	4–5	Brennan (2–4)	**Wilson** (0–1)	—	1,444	18–7	3–3	

April: 11–7
Date	Time	Opponent	Rank	Site/stadium	Score	Win	Loss	Save	Attendance	Overall record	Big 12 Record	Ref
April 2	2:00 PM	@ New Mexico	#17	Santa Ana Star Field • Albuquerque, NM	15–6	**Bonnin** (3–0)	Waller (1–2)	—	573	19–7	—	
April 3	2:00 PM	@ New Mexico	#17	Santa Ana Star Field • Albuquerque, NM	9–12	Emond (2–1)	**Floyd** (2–2)	Schilling (2)	543	19–8	—	
April 5	2:00 PM	Kansas	#17	Dan Law Field at Rip Griffin Park • Lubbock, TX	5–4	**Haveman** (2–1)	Goldsberry (2–4)	—	3,244	20–8	4–3	
April 6	2:00 PM	Kansas	#17	Dan Law Field at Rip Griffin Park • Lubbock, TX	19–4	**Kilian** (4–2)	Zeferjahn (3–2)	—	3,798	21–8	5–3	
April 7	1:00 PM	Kansas	#17	Dan Law Field at Rip Griffin Park • Lubbock, TX	9–13	Barry (1–0)	**Beeter** (0–2)	Ulane (7)	3,594	21–9	5–4	
April 9	7:00 PM	vs. New Mexico State	#15	Security Bank Ballpark • Midland, TX	10–5	**Montgomery** (3–0)	Allen (0–1)	—	5,399	22–9	—	
April 12	6:00 PM	West Virginia	#15	Dan Law Field at Rip Griffin Park • Lubbock, TX	0–2	Manoah (5–2)	**Lanning** (0–1)	—	2,187	22–10	5–5	
April 13	3:00 PM	West Virginia	#15	Dan Law Field at Rip Griffin Park • Lubbock, TX	3–4	Kessler (2–2)	**Floyd** (2–3)	—	3,494	22–11	5–6	
April 14	11:00 AM	West Virginia	#15	Dan Law Field at Rip Griffin Park • Lubbock, TX	3–0	**Kilian** (5–2)	Strowd (4–3)	—	931	23–11	6–6	
April 16	5:00 PM	@ Duke	#22	Durham Bulls Athletic Park • Durham, NC	6–13	Dockman (3–1)	**Bonnin** (3–1)	—	488	23–12	—	
April 18	6:30 PM	#18 Baylor	#22	Dan Law Field at Rip Griffin Park • Lubbock, TX	10–11 (11)	Hill (6–0)	**McMillon** (0–2)	—	3,526	23–13	6–7	
April 19	6:30 PM	#18 Baylor	#22	Dan Law Field at Rip Griffin Park • Lubbock, TX	3–2	**Floyd** (3–3)	Freeman (0–1)	—	4,432	24–13	7–7	
April 20	2:00 PM	#18 Baylor	#22	Dan Law Field at Rip Griffin Park • Lubbock, TX	13–3 (7)	**Kilian** (6–2)	Helton (1–2)	—	4,432	25–13	8–7	
April 23	6:30 PM	New Mexico	#18	Dan Law Field at Rip Griffin Park • Lubbock, TX	6–4	**Floyd** (4–3)	Coffey (3–3)	**Beeter** (6)	3,376	26–13	—	
April 24	2:00 PM	New Mexico	#18	Dan Law Field at Rip Griffin Park • Lubbock, TX	**Cancelled**							
April 26	6:30 PM	#22 Oklahoma State	#18	Dan Law Field at Rip Griffin Park • Lubbock, TX	12–4	**Dallas** (4–0)	Elliott (5–3)	—	4,432	27–13	9–7	
April 27	2:00 PM	#22 Oklahoma State	#18	Dan Law Field at Rip Griffin Park • Lubbock, TX	10–2	**Kilian** (7–2)	Scott (2–1)	—	4,432	28–13	10–7	
April 28	2:00 PM	#22 Oklahoma State	#18	Dan Law Field at Rip Griffin Park • Lubbock, TX	5–2	**McMillon** (1–2)	Standlee (2–1)	**Beeter** (7)	3,861	29–13	11–7	
April 30	6:30 PM	UTRGV	#11	Dan Law Field at Rip Griffin Park • Lubbock, TX	3–6	Balderrama (1–0)	**Montgomery** (3–1)	Jackson (8)	3,451	29–14	—	

May: 7–1
Date	Time	Opponent	Rank	Site/stadium	Score	Win	Loss	Save	Attendance	Overall record	Big 12 Record	Ref
May 1	2:00 PM	UTRGV	#11	Dan Law Field at Rip Griffin Park • Lubbock, TX	19–11	**Garlett** (1–0)	Palm (3–2)	—	3,039	30–14	—	
May 3	6:30 PM	@ Oklahoma	#11	L. Dale Mitchell Baseball Park • Norman, OK	10–6	**Dobbins** (2–0)	Matthews (0–3)	**Floyd** (2)	1,146	31–14	12–7	
May 4	2:00 PM	@ Oklahoma	#11	L. Dale Mitchell Baseball Park • Norman, OK	7–3	**Queen** (3–0)	Smith (0–1)	—	1,676	32–14	13–7	
May 5	1:00 PM	@ Oklahoma	#11	L. Dale Mitchell Baseball Park • Norman, OK	8–4	**Bonnin** (4–1)	Abram (6–2)	—	1,028	33–14	14–7	
May 7	11:00 AM	FIU	#10	Dan Law Field at Rip Griffin Park • Lubbock, TX	9–6	**McMillon** (2–2)	Santanna (2–3)	**Beeter** (8)	3,147	34–14	—	
May 7	2:00 PM	FIU	#10	Dan Law Field at Rip Griffin Park • Lubbock, TX	**Cancelled**							
May 16	6:30 PM	TCU	#10	Dan Law Field at Rip Griffin Park • Lubbock, TX	1–3 (14)	Brown (1–0)	**McMillon** (2–3)	Mihlbauer (1)	4,011	34–15	14–8	
May 17	6:30 PM	TCU	#10	Dan Law Field at Rip Griffin Park • Lubbock, TX	7–2	**Kilian** (8–2)	King (4–3)	—	3,954	35–15	15–8	
May 18	2:00 PM	TCU	#10	Dan Law Field at Rip Griffin Park • Lubbock, TX	8–4	**Bonnin** (5–1)	Williamson (3–5)	—	4,432	36–15	16–8	

Post–season: 10–5

Big 12 tournament: 3–2
Date	Time	Opponent	Rank	Site/stadium	Score	Win	Loss	Save	Attendance	Overall record	B12T Record	Ref
May 22	12:30 PM	vs. (8) Kansas State	#10 (1)	Chickasaw Bricktown Ballpark • Oklahoma City, OK	7–4	**Dallas** (5–0)	Wicks (6–3)	**Floyd** (3)	3,220	37–15	1–0	
May 23	4:00 PM	vs. #19 (4) West Virginia	#10 (1)	Chickasaw Bricktown Ballpark • Oklahoma City, OK	1–5	Manoah (9–3)	**Kilian** (8–3)	—	3,687	37–16	1–1	
May 24	3:15 PM	vs. (5) Kansas	#10 (1)	Chickasaw Bricktown Ballpark • Oklahoma City, OK	7–5	**Queen** (4–0)	Cyr (4–7)	**Haveman** (1)	5,974	38–16	2–1	
May 25	10:25 AM	vs. #19 (4) West Virginia	#10 (1)	Chickasaw Bricktown Ballpark • Oklahoma City, OK	10–3	**Sublette** (1–0)	Strowd (5–6)	**Haveman** (2)	6,097	39–16	3–1	
May 25	7:10 PM	vs. #19 (4) West Virginia	#10 (1)	Chickasaw Bricktown Ballpark • Oklahoma City, OK	0–2	Bergert (2–0)	**Dobbins** (2–1)	Ottinger (1)	3,713	39–17	3–2	

NCAA tournament: 5–1
Date	Time	Opponent	Rank	Site/stadium	Score	Win	Loss	Save	Attendance	Overall record	NCAA Tourn	Ref
May 31	3:00 PM	(4) Army	#8 (1)	Dan Law Field at Rip Griffin Park • Lubbock, TX	11–2	**Dallas** (6–0)	Burggraaf (5–3)	—	4,432	40–17	1–0	
June 1	4:36 PM	#24 (2) Dallas Baptist	#8 (1)	Dan Law Field at Rip Griffin Park • Lubbock, TX	3–2	**Floyd** (5–3)	Martinson (8–4)	—	4,567	41–17	2–0	
June 2	6:25 PM	#24 (2) Dallas Baptist	#8 (1)	Dan Law Field at Rip Griffin Park • Lubbock, TX	3–0	**Bonnin** (6–1)	Reeves (1–2)	**McMillon** (2)	4,679	42–17	3–0	
June 7	2:00 PM	#9 Oklahoma State	#8	Dan Law Field at Rip Griffin Park • Lubbock, TX	8–6	**Dallas** (7–0)	Elliott (10–4)	**McMillon** (3)	4,732	43–17	4–0	
June 8	5:00 PM	#9 Oklahoma State	#8	Dan Law Field at Rip Griffin Park • Lubbock, TX	5–6	Leeper (4–3)	**Beeter** (0–3)	—	4,833	43–18	4–1	
June 9	5:00 PM	#9 Oklahoma State	#8	Dan Law Field at Rip Griffin Park • Lubbock, TX	8–6	**McMillon** (3–3)	Leeper (4–4)	**Haveman** (3)	4,782	44–18	5–1	

College World Series: 2–2
Date	Time	Opponent	Rank	Site/stadium	Score	Win	Loss	Save	Attendance	Overall record	CWS	Ref
June 15	1:00 PM	Michigan	#8	TD Ameritrade Park • Omaha, NE	3–5	Kauffmann (11–6)	**Dallas** (7–1)	Criswell (2)	24,148	44–19	0–1	
June 17	1:00 PM	#5 Arkansas	#8	TD Ameritrade Park • Omaha, NE	5–4	**McMillon** (4–3)	Scroggins (3–2)	**Floyd** (4)	19,236	45–19	1–1	
June 19	6:00 PM	Florida State	#8	TD Ameritrade Park • Omaha, NE	4–1	**Bonnin** (7–1)	Grady (9–6)	**Floyd** (5)	24,104	46–19	2–1	
June 21	1:00 PM	Michigan	#8	TD Ameritrade Park • Omaha, NE	3–15	Kauffmann (12–6)	**Dallas** (7–2)	Criswell (3)	20,944	46–20	2–2	

Legend: = Win = Loss = Postponement
Bold = Texas Tech team member

"#" represents ranking. All rankings from D1Baseball on the date of the contest.
"()" represents postseason seeding in the Big 12 tournament or NCAA Regional, respectively.

== NCAA tournament ==
=== Lubbock Regional ===
May 31, 2019 3:06 pm (CDT) at Dan Law Field at Rip Griffin Park in Lubbock, Texas, 80 °F (27 °C), cloudy
Team	1	2	3	4	5	6	7	8	9	R	H	E
(4) Army	0	0	0	0	0	1	0	0	1	2	6	1
(1) Texas Tech	3	2	1	0	2	0	3	0	X	11	16	1
WP: Micah Dallas (6–0) LP: Daniel Burggraaf (5–3); Attendance: 4,432

June 1, 2019 4:36 pm (CDT) at Dan Law Field at Rip Griffin Park in Lubbock, Texas, 88 °F (31 °C), cloudy
Team	1	2	3	4	5	6	7	8	9	R	H	E
(2) Dallas Baptist	0	0	0	0	2	0	0	0	0	2	7	1
(1) Texas Tech	0	3	0	0	0	0	0	0	0	3	6	2
WP: Taylor Floyd (5–3) LP: Jordan Martinson (8–4); Attendance: 4,567

June 2, 2019 6:26 pm (CDT) at Dan Law Field at Rip Griffin Park in Lubbock, Texas, 85 °F (29 °C), clear
Team	1	2	3	4	5	6	7	8	9	R	H	E
(2) Dallas Baptist	0	0	0	0	2	0	0	0	0	0	5	0
(1) Texas Tech	3	0	0	0	0	0	0	0	X	3	6	0
WP: Bryce Bonnin (6–1) LP: Cole Reeves (1–2) Sv: John McMillon (2); Attendance: 4,679

=== Lubbock Super Regional ===
June 7, 2019 2:06 (CDT) at Dan Law Field at Rip Griffin Park in Lubbock, Texas, 85 °F (29 °C), clear
Team	1	2	3	4	5	6	7	8	9	R	H	E
#9 Oklahoma State	0	0	0	2	1	0	2	1	0	6	9	1
#8 Texas Tech	0	2	1	3	0	0	1	1	X	8	11	2
WP: Micah Dallas (7–0) LP: Jensen Elliott (10–4) Sv: John McMillon (3); Attendance: 4,732

June 8, 2019 5:00 pm (CDT) at Dan Law Field at Rip Griffin Park in Lubbock, Texas, 92 °F (33 °C), clear
Team	1	2	3	4	5	6	7	8	9	R	H	E
#8 Texas Tech	0	0	1	0	0	1	1	1	1	5	11	0
#9 Oklahoma State	1	0	0	0	2	0	0	2	1	6	7	1
WP: Ben Leeper (4–3) LP: Clayton Beeter (0–3); Attendance: 4,833

June 9, 2019 5:00 pm (CDT) at Dan Law Field at Rip Griffin Park in Lubbock, Texas, 63 °F (17 °C), cloudy
Team	1	2	3	4	5	6	7	8	9	R	H	E
#9 Oklahoma State	0	1	0	0	2	0	1	2	0	6	7	1
#8 Texas Tech	0	0	2	1	1	0	0	4	X	8	10	1
WP: John McMillon (3–3) LP: Ben Leeper (4–4) Sv: Dane Haveman (3); Attendance: 4,782

=== College World Series ===
June 15, 2019 1:00 pm (CDT) at TD Ameritrade Park in Omaha, Nebraska, 81 °F (27 °C), cloudy
Team	1	2	3	4	5	6	7	8	9	R	H	E
Michigan	1	0	3	0	0	0	1	0	0	5	8	0
#8 Texas Tech	0	0	2	0	0	1	0	0	0	3	9	1
WP: Karl Kauffmann (11–6) LP: Micah Dallas (7–1) Sv: Jeff Criswell (2); Attendance: 24,148

June 17, 2019 1:00 pm (CDT) at TD Ameritrade Park in Omaha, Nebraska, 82 °F (28 °C), cloudy
Team	1	2	3	4	5	6	7	8	9	R	H	E
#5 Arkansas	0	1	2	0	0	0	0	1	0	4	8	0
#8 Texas Tech	0	0	0	2	1	1	0	1	X	5	9	0
WP: John McMillon (4–3) LP: Cody Scroggins (3–2) Sv: Taylor Floyd (4); Attendance: 19,236

June 19, 2019 6:00 pm (CDT) at TD Ameritrade Park in Omaha, Nebraska, 78 °F (26 °C), cloudy
Team	1	2	3	4	5	6	7	8	9	R	H	E
#8 Texas Tech	0	0	0	1	0	1	0	2	0	4	9	1
Florida State	0	0	0	1	0	0	0	0	0	1	3	0
WP: Bryce Bonnin (7–1) LP: Conor Grady (9–6) Sv: Taylor Floyd (5); Attendance: 24,104

June 21, 2019 1:00 pm (CDT) at TD Ameritrade Park in Omaha, Nebraska, 71 °F (22 °C), cloudy
Team	1	2	3	4	5	6	7	8	9	R	H	E
#8 Texas Tech	0	3	0	0	0	0	0	0	0	3	7	2
Michigan	2	2	2	1	0	5	2	1	X	15	14	0
WP: Karl Kauffmann (12–6) LP: Micah Dallas (7–2) Sv: Jeff Criswell (3); Attendance: 20,944

== Rankings ==
Ranking movements Legend: ██ Increase in ranking ██ Decrease in ranking
	Week																		
Poll	Pre	1	2	3	4	5	6	7	8	9	10	11	12	13	14	15	16	17	Final
Coaches'	4	4*		12	9	17	13	14	13	18	17	12	10	10	10	10	10	10	5
Baseball America	8	8	8	11	9	13	11	11	11	16	15	11	9	9	9	9	9	9	4
Collegiate Baseball^	4	4	4	10	7	18	14	15	19	23	21	16	15	15	12	13	9	5	4
NCBWA†	3	6	6	11	8	13	11	12	11	16	17	10	9	8	7	6	7	6	4
D1Baseball	3	3	3	14	11	19	18	17	15	22	18	11	10	10	10	8	10	8	4

^ Collegiate Baseball ranked 40 teams in their preseason poll, but only ranked 30 teams weekly during the season.
† NCBWA ranks 30 teams in their preseason poll, but only ranks 25 teams weekly during the season.
* A new poll was not released for this week, so for comparison purposes, the previous week's ranking is inserted in this week's slot.

== 2019 MLB draft ==
Player	Position	Round	Overall	MLB team
Josh Jung	3B	1	8	Texas Rangers
Gabe Holt	OF	7	223	Milwaukee Brewers
Caleb Kilian	RHP	8	236	San Francisco Giants
Taylor Floyd	RHP	10	313	Milwaukee Brewers
John McMillon	RHP	11	322	Detroit Tigers
Caleb Freeman	RHP	15	440	Chicago White Sox
Cameron Warren	1B	22	654	Cincinnati Reds
