= 2020 Minnesota Golden Gophers baseball team =

American college baseball season

2020 Minnesota Golden Gophers baseball
- Conference: Big Ten Conference
- Record: 8–10 (0–0 Big Ten)
- Head coach: John Anderson (39th season)
- Assistant coach: Brandon Hunt (2nd season)
- Hitting coach: Patrick Casey (7th season)
- Pitching coach: Ty McDevitt (4th season)
- Home stadium: Siebert Field; U.S. Bank Stadium

2020 Big Ten Conference baseball standings
	Conf.				Overall
Team	W		L	PCT	W		L	PCT
Iowa ‍‍‍	0	–	0	–	10	–	5	.667
Maryland ‍‍‍	0	–	0	–	10	–	5	.667
Penn State ‍‍‍	0	–	0	–	10	–	5	.667
Illinois ‍‍‍	0	–	0	–	8	–	5	.615
Indiana ‍‍‍	0	–	0	–	9	–	6	.600
Michigan State ‍‍‍	0	–	0	–	9	–	6	.600
Michigan ‍‍‍	0	–	0	–	8	–	7	.533
Purdue ‍‍‍	0	–	0	–	7	–	7	.500
Northwestern ‍‍‍	0	–	0	–	6	–	6	.500
Nebraska ‍‍‍	0	–	0	–	7	–	8	.467
Minnesota ‍‍‍	0	–	0	–	8	–	10	.444
Ohio State ‍‍‍	0	–	0	–	6	–	8	.429
Rutgers ‍‍‍	0	–	0	–	6	–	9	.400
‡ – Tournament champion As of March 12, 2020; Rankings from D1Baseball

The 2020 Minnesota Golden Gophers baseball team was a baseball team that represented the University of Minnesota in the 2020 NCAA Division I baseball season. The Golden Gophers were members of the Big Ten Conference and played their home games at Siebert Field and U.S. Bank Stadium in Minneapolis, Minnesota. They were led by thirty-ninth-year head coach John Anderson.

The season was cut short in stages by March 12 due to the COVID-19 pandemic.

== Previous season ==
The Golden Gophers finished the 2019 NCAA Division I baseball season 29–27 overall (15–9 conference) and tied for third place in conference standings, qualifying for the 2019 Big Ten Conference baseball tournament.

=== MLB draft ===
The following Golden Gophers on the 2019 roster were selected in the 2019 Major League Baseball draft:

List of Drafted Players
Name	2019 Class	Pos.	Team	Round	Signed/Returned
Brett Schulze	Junior	RHP	Philadelphia Phillies	7th	Signed
Jake Stevenson	Senior	RHP	Cincinnati Reds	10th	Signed*
Eli Wilson	Junior	C	Pittsburgh Pirates	16th	Signed
Nick Lackney	Senior	LHP	Philadelphia Phillies	18th	Signed*

* indicates draftee had no more college eligibility

== Roster ==
2020 Minnesota Golden Gophers baseball team
Players
Coaches

#	Pos.	Name	B/T	Height	Weight	Year	Previous school	Home town
1	INF	Zack Elliott	R/R	6 ft 3 in (1.91 m)	190 lb (86 kg)	So	Eden Prairie H. S.	Eden Prairie, Minnesota
2	INF	Zack Raabe	R/R	5 ft 10 in (1.78 m)	177 lb (80 kg)	So	Forest Lake H. S.	Forest Lake, Minnesota
3	RHP	Drake Davis	R/R	6 ft 1 in (1.85 m)	205 lb (93 kg)	RS So	Ralston Valley H. S.	Highlands Ranch, Colorado
4	INF	Ronald Sweeny	L/R	6 ft 3 in (1.91 m)	230 lb (104 kg)	Jr	Iowa Western Community College	Woodbury, Minnesota
6	C	Chase Stanke	L/R	6 ft 2 in (1.88 m)	180 lb (82 kg)	So	Marmion Academy	Sugar Grove, Illinois
7	INF	Jordan Kozicky	R/R	6 ft 1 in (1.85 m)	180 lb (82 kg)	RS Sr	Southwest H. S.	Minneapolis, Minnesota
8	OF	Andrew Wilhite	L/R	6 ft 1 in (1.85 m)	195 lb (88 kg)	So	Stillman Valley H. S.	Stillman Valley, Illinois
9		Kyle Bork	R/R	6 ft 5 in (1.96 m)	190 lb (86 kg)	Fr	St. Francis Schools	Alpharetta, Georgia
10	INF	Drew Stahl	R/R	6 ft 0 in (1.83 m)	175 lb (79 kg)	Fr	Mountain Vista H. S.	Castle Rock, Colorado
13	OF	Otto Grimm	L/R	6 ft 3 in (1.91 m)	180 lb (82 kg)	RS Fr	Bemidji H. S.	Bemidji, Minnesota
15	LHP	Jack Liffrig	R/L	6 ft 1 in (1.85 m)	185 lb (84 kg)	So	Mountain Vista H. S.	Highlands Ranch, Colorado
16	OF	Easton Bertrand	R/R	6 ft 4 in (1.93 m)	190 lb (86 kg)	Jr	Manteno H. S.	Manteno, Illinois
17	LHP	Danny Kapala	L/L	6 ft 3 in (1.91 m)	200 lb (91 kg)	Jr	Eastview H. S.	Apple Valley, Minnesota
18	LHP	Will Anderson	L/L	6 ft 0 in (1.83 m)	180 lb (82 kg)	Fr	St. Michael-Albertville H. S.	St. Michael, Minnesota
19	OF	Gabe Knowles	L/R	6 ft 2 in (1.88 m)	190 lb (86 kg)	RS Jr	Cathedral H. S.	New Ulm, Minnesota
20	C	Riley Swenson	R/R	6 ft 3 in (1.91 m)	195 lb (88 kg)	RS Fr	Chaska H. S.	Chaska, Minnesota
21	OF	Drew Hmielewski	L/R	6 ft 2 in (1.88 m)	215 lb (98 kg)	RS Jr	Marshall H. S.	Marshall, Minnesota
22	RHP	Patrick Fredrickson	R/R	6 ft 7 in (2.01 m)	220 lb (100 kg)	Jr	Gig Harbor H. S.	Gig Harbor, Washington
23	RHP	Max Meyer	L/R	6 ft 0 in (1.83 m)	185 lb (84 kg)	Jr	Woodbury H. S.	Woodbury, Minnesota
27	RHP	Nolan Burchill	R/R	6 ft 1 in (1.85 m)	185 lb (84 kg)	RS Jr	Lincoln H. S.	Sioux Falls, South Dakota
28	C	Jack Kelly	L/R	6 ft 0 in (1.83 m)	185 lb (84 kg)	Jr	St. Michael-Albertville H. S.	St. Michael, Minnesota
29	OF	Steve Jamroziak	R/R	6 ft 3 in (1.91 m)	185 lb (84 kg)	Fr	Muskego H. S.	Muskego, Wisconsin
30	INF	Jack Wassel	L/R	6 ft 2 in (1.88 m)	205 lb (93 kg)	RS Jr	Geneva H. S.	Geneva, Illinois
32	LHP	Bubba Horton	R/L	6 ft 3 in (1.91 m)	195 lb (88 kg)	Jr	Maple Grove H. S.	Corcoran, Minnesota
33	RHP	Sam Thoresen	R/R	6 ft 3 in (1.91 m)	210 lb (95 kg)	Jr	Minnetonka H. S.	Minnetonka, Minnesota
35	INF	Noah Berghammer	R/R	6 ft 0 in (1.83 m)	178 lb (81 kg)	RS Fr	Craig H. S.	Janesville, Wisconsin
36	RHP	Joshua Culliver	R/R	6 ft 2 in (1.88 m)	205 lb (93 kg)	Jr	Creighton Preparatory School	Omaha, Nebraska
37	RHP	Trent Schoeberl	L/R	6 ft 5 in (1.96 m)	195 lb (88 kg)	Fr	White Bear Lake	White Bear Lake, Minnesota
38	RHP	Michael Gurka	R/R	6 ft 3 in (1.91 m)	205 lb (93 kg)	Fr	Joliet Catholic Academy	Clarendon Hills, Illinois
39	RHP	Gus Radel	R/R	6 ft 2 in (1.88 m)	220 lb (100 kg)	So	Roosevelt H. S.	Sioux Falls, South Dakota
40	RHP	J. P. Massey	R/R	6 ft 5 in (1.96 m)	180 lb (82 kg)	So	Gwendolyn Brooks College Preparatory Academy	Chicago, Illinois
41	RHP	Bennett Theisen	R/R	6 ft 0 in (1.83 m)	210 lb (95 kg)	Fr	Minnehaha Academy	St. Paul, Minnesota
43	LHP	Ryan Duffy	R/L	6 ft 3 in (1.91 m)	180 lb (82 kg)	Jr	South Saint Paul H. S.	South St. Paul, Minnesota
44	RHP	Sam Ireland	R/R	6 ft 3 in (1.91 m)	195 lb (88 kg)	Fr	Mountain Vista H. S.	Highlands Ranch, Colorado

Head coach

John Anderson

Assistant coach(es)

Brandon Hunt

Hitting coach(es)

Ty McDevitt

Pitching coach(es)

Patrick Casey

Legend

- (C) Team captain
- (S) Suspended
- (I) Ineligible
- Injured
- Current redshirt

Roster
Last update: February 26, 2020

== Schedule ==
2020 Minnesota Golden Gophers baseball game log
Regular season
February (5–5)

#	Date	Opponent	Site/stadium	Score	Win	Loss	Save	Attendance	Overall record	B1G record
1	February 14	vs Oregon	Phoenix Municipal Stadium • Tempe, Arizona	12–10	Meyer (1–0)	Kafka (0–1)	Culliver (1)	307	1–0	–
2	February 15	vs Pepperdine	Phoenix Memorial Stadium • Tempe, Arizona	6–8	Chandler (1–0)	Thoresen (0–1)	None	183	1–1	–
3	February 16	vs San Diego	Phoenix Memorial Stadium • Tempe, Arizona	3–7	Rustad (1–0)	Fredrickson (0–1)	None	290	1–2	–
4	February 17	vs Arizona	Phoenix Memorial Stadium • Tempe, Arizona	5–2	Davis (1–0)	Netz (0–1)	Horton (1)	520	2–2	0–0
5	February 22	TCU	U.S. Bank Stadium • Minneapolis, Minnesota,	0–12	Ray (0–1)	Meyer (1–1)	None	1255	2–3	–
6	February 23	TCU	U.S. Bank Stadium • Minneapolis, Minnesota	7–6	Massey (1–0)	King (0–1)	Horton (2)	938	3–3	–
7	February 24	TCU	U.S. Bank Stadium • Minneapolis, Minnesota	2–11	Smith (1–0)	Fredrickson (0–2)	None	242	3–4	–
8	February 26	vs South Dakota State	U.S. Bank Stadium • Minneapolis, Minnesota	4–2	Schoeberl (1–0)	McSherry (0–1)	Thoresen (1)	241	4–4	–
9	February 28	North Carolina	U.S. Bank Stadium • Minneapolis, Minnesota	4–1	Meyer (2–1)	Sandy (0–2)	None	1,704	5–4	–
10	February 29	No. 14 Duke	U.S. Bank Stadium • Minneapolis, Minnesota	3–7	Girard (1–0)	Horton (0–1)	None	2,540	5–5	–

March (2–5)

#	Date	Opponent	Site/stadium	Score	Win	Loss	Save	Attendance	Overall record	B1G record
11	March 1	No. 13 NC State	U.S. Bank Stadium • Minneapolis, Minnesota	7–11	Harrison (2–0)	Ireland (0–1)	None	1,436	5–6	–
12	March 3	North Dakota State	U.S. Bank Stadium • Minneapolis, Minnesota	4–7	Harm (1–0)	Kapala (0–1)	Pilla (2)	555	5–7	–
13	March 4	South Dakota State	U.S. Bank Stadium • Minneapolis, Minnesota	8–10	Sundquist (1–1)	Anderson (0–1)	Mogen (1)	202	5–8	–
14	March 6	Utah	U.S. Bank Stadium • Minneapolis, Minnesota	6–4	Meyer (3–1)	Kelly (0–1)	Ireland (1)	340	6–8	–
15	March 7	Utah	U.S. Bank Stadium • Minneapolis, Minnesota	3–6	Pierce (1–1)	Massey (1–1)	Schramm (2)	456	6–9	–
16	March 8	Utah	U.S. Bank Stadium • Minneapolis, Minnesota	11–17	Giffins (1–1)	Burchill (0–1)	None	429	6–10	–
17	March 10	Creighton	U.S. Bank Stadium • Minneapolis, Minnesota	5–3	Schoeberl (2–0)	Holderfield (0–1)	Ireland (2)	307	7–10	–
18	March 11	Creighton	U.S. Bank Stadium • Minneapolis, Minnesota	5–4	Burchill (1–1)	Tebrake (3–2)	Fredrickson (1)	336	8–10	–
19	March 13	at Air Force	Falcon Baseball Field • Colorado Springs, Colorado	Canceled (COVID-19 pandemic)						
20	March 14	at Air Force	Falcon Baseball Field • Colorado Springs, Colorado	Canceled (COVID-19 pandemic)						
21	March 15	at Air Force	Falcon Baseball Field • Colorado Springs, Colorado	Canceled (COVID-19 pandemic)						
22	March 20	at Texas Tech	Dan Law Field at Rip Griffin Park • Lubbock, Texas,	Canceled (COVID-19 pandemic)						
23	March 21	at Texas Tech	Dan Law Field at Rip Griffin Park • Lubbock, Texas	Canceled (COVID-19 pandemic)						
24	March 22	at Texas Tech	Dan Law Field at Rip Griffin Park • Lubbock, Texas	Canceled (COVID-19 pandemic)						
25	March 27	at Michigan State	Drayton McLane Baseball Stadium at John H. Kobs Field • East Lansing, Michigan,	Canceled (COVID-19 pandemic)						
26	March 28	at Michigan State	Drayton McLane Baseball Stadium at John H. Kobs Field • East Lansing, Michigan	Canceled (COVID-19 pandemic)						
27	March 29	at Michigan State	Drayton McLane Baseball Stadium at John H. Kobs Field • East Lansing, Michigan	Canceled (COVID-19 pandemic)						

April (0–0)

#	Date	Opponent	Site/stadium	Score	Win	Loss	Save	Attendance	Overall record	B1G record
28	April 3	Rutgers	Siebert Field • Minneapolis, Minnesota	Canceled (COVID-19 pandemic)						
29	April 4	Rutgers	Siebert Field • Minneapolis, Minnesota	Canceled (COVID-19 pandemic)						
30	April 5	Rutgers	Siebert Field • Minneapolis, Minnesota	Canceled (COVID-19 pandemic)						
31	April 7	Omaha	Siebert Field • Minneapolis, Minnesota	Canceled (COVID-19 pandemic)						
32	April 8	North Dakota State	Siebert Field • Minneapolis, Minnesota	Canceled (COVID-19 pandemic)						
33	April 10	at Illinois	Illinois Field • Champaign, Illinois	Canceled (COVID-19 pandemic)						
34	April 11	at Illinois	Illinois Field • Champaign, Illinois	Canceled (COVID-19 pandemic)						
35	April 12	at Illinois	Illinois Field • Champaign, Illinois	Canceled (COVID-19 pandemic)						
36	April 15	South Dakota State	Siebert Field • Minneapolis, Minnesota	Canceled (COVID-19 pandemic)						
37	April 17	Northwestern	Siebert Field • Minneapolis, Minnesota	Canceled (COVID-19 pandemic)						
38	April 18	Northwestern	Siebert Field • Minneapolis, Minnesota	Canceled (COVID-19 pandemic)						
39	April 19	Northwestern	Siebert Field • Minneapolis, Minnesota	Canceled (COVID-19 pandemic)						
40	April 22	Milwaukee	Siebert Field • Minneapolis, Minnesota	Canceled (COVID-19 pandemic)						
41	April 24	Purdue	Siebert Field • Minneapolis, Minnesota	Canceled (COVID-19 pandemic)						
42	April 25	Purdue	Siebert Field • Minneapolis, Minnesota	Canceled (COVID-19 pandemic)						
43	April 26	Purdue	Siebert Field • Minneapolis, Minnesota	Canceled (COVID-19 pandemic)						

May (0–0)

#	Date	Opponent	Site/stadium	Score	Win	Loss	Save	Attendance	Overall record	B1G record
44	May 1	at Iowa	Duane Banks Field • Iowa City, Iowa	Canceled (COVID-19 pandemic)						
45	May 2	at Iowa	Duane Banks Field • Iowa City, Iowa	Canceled (COVID-19 pandemic)						
46	May 3	at Iowa	Duane Banks Field • Iowa City, Iowa	Canceled (COVID-19 pandemic)						
47	May 4	Oral Roberts	Siebert Field • Minneapolis, Minnesota	Canceled (COVID-19 pandemic)						
48	May 8	Michigan	Siebert Field • Minneapolis, Minnesota	Canceled (COVID-19 pandemic)						
49	May 9	Michigan	Siebert Field • Minneapolis, Minnesota	Canceled (COVID-19 pandemic)						
50	May 10	Michigan	Siebert Field • Minneapolis, Minnesota	Canceled (COVID-19 pandemic)						
51	May 14	at Maryland	Shipley Field • College Park, Maryland	Canceled (COVID-19 pandemic)						
52	May 15	at Maryland	Shipley Field • College Park, Maryland	Canceled (COVID-19 pandemic)						
53	May 16	at Maryland	Shipley Field • College Park, Maryland	Canceled (COVID-19 pandemic)						

== 2020 MLB draft ==
Player	Position	Round	Overall	MLB team
Max Meyer	RHP	1	3	Miami Marlins
