= 2020 Purdue Boilermakers baseball team =

American college baseball season

2020 Purdue Boilermakers baseball
- Conference: Big Ten Conference
- Record: 7–7 (0–0 Big Ten)
- Head coach: Greg Goff (1st season)
- Assistant coach: Harry Shipley (1st season)
- Hitting coach: Cooper Fouts (2nd season)
- Pitching coach: Chris Marx (1st season)
- Home stadium: Alexander Field

2020 Big Ten Conference baseball standings
	Conf.				Overall
Team	W		L	PCT	W		L	PCT
Iowa ‍‍‍	0	–	0	–	10	–	5	.667
Maryland ‍‍‍	0	–	0	–	10	–	5	.667
Penn State ‍‍‍	0	–	0	–	10	–	5	.667
Illinois ‍‍‍	0	–	0	–	8	–	5	.615
Indiana ‍‍‍	0	–	0	–	9	–	6	.600
Michigan State ‍‍‍	0	–	0	–	9	–	6	.600
Michigan ‍‍‍	0	–	0	–	8	–	7	.533
Purdue ‍‍‍	0	–	0	–	7	–	7	.500
Northwestern ‍‍‍	0	–	0	–	6	–	6	.500
Nebraska ‍‍‍	0	–	0	–	7	–	8	.467
Minnesota ‍‍‍	0	–	0	–	8	–	10	.444
Ohio State ‍‍‍	0	–	0	–	6	–	8	.429
Rutgers ‍‍‍	0	–	0	–	6	–	9	.400
‡ – Tournament champion As of March 12, 2020; Rankings from D1Baseball

The 2020 Purdue Boilermakers baseball team was a baseball team that represented Purdue University in the 2020 NCAA Division I baseball season. The Boilermakers were members of the Big Ten Conference and played their home games at Alexander Field in West Lafayette, Indiana. They were led by first-year head coach Greg Goff.

The season was cut short in stages by March 12 due to the COVID-19 pandemic.

== Previous season ==
The Boilermakers finished the 2019 NCAA Division I baseball season 20–34 overall (7–16 conference) and twelfth place in conference standings, failing to quality for the 2019 Big Ten Conference baseball tournament

=== MLB draft ===
The following Boilermakers on the 2019 roster were selected in the 2019 Major League Baseball draft:

List of Drafted Players
Name	2019 Class	Pos.	Team	Round	Signed/Returned
Patrick J. Smith	Senior	LHP	Kansas City Royals	34th	Signed*

* indicates draftee had no more college eligibility

== Preseason ==
On June 11, 2019, head coach Mark Wasikowski left the Purdue program to return to Oregon as the head coach. Just two days later, Purdue promoted volunteer assistant, Greg Goff to head coach. On June 19, 2019, Goff named Campbell pitching coach and recruiting coordinator, Chris Marx, the team's pitching coach. On September 5, 2019, former Purdue shortstop, Harry Shipley was named a volunteer assistant coach.

== Roster ==
2020 Purdue Boilermakers baseball team
Players
Coaches

#	Pos.	Name	B/T	Height	Weight	Year	Previous school	Home town
2	INF	Tyler Powers	R/R	5 ft 9 in (1.75 m)	155 lb (70 kg)	Jr	Lafayette Central Catholics Jr/Sr H. S.	Lafayette, Indiana
3	INF	Tanner Haston	R/R	5 ft 11 in (1.8 m)	175 lb (79 kg)	RS Fr	Mooresville H. S.	Mooresville, Indiana
4	OF	Skyler Hunter	S/R	5 ft 10 in (1.78 m)	185 lb (84 kg)	Sr	Hood River Valley H. S.	Hood River, Oregon
5	INF	Evan Albrecht	R/R	5 ft 10 in (1.78 m)	150 lb (68 kg)	So	West Bend West H. S.	West Bend, Wisconsin
7	C	Zac Fascia	L/R	6 ft 1 in (1.85 m)	220 lb (100 kg)	Sr	Indian Hills Community College	Brampton, Ontario
9	INF	Ryan Howe	R/R	6 ft 2 in (1.88 m)	180 lb (82 kg)	So	Prospect H. S.	Mount Prospect, Illinois
10	INF	Justin Walker Jr. (redshirt)	S/R	6 ft 0 in (1.83 m)	170 lb (77 kg)	Jr	Jefferson H. S.	Lafayette, Indiana
13	INF	Mason Gavre	R/R	6 ft 0 in (1.83 m)	200 lb (91 kg)	Jr	Paradise Valley Community College	Tucson, Arizona
14	RHP	Cory Brooks	R/R	6 ft 1 in (1.85 m)	195 lb (88 kg)	RS So	Hillard Darby H. S.	Hilliard, Ohio
15	LHP	Connor Ayers	L/L	6 ft 2 in (1.88 m)	180 lb (82 kg)	Fr	McCutcheon H. S.	Lafayette, Indiana
16	RHP	Trevor Cheaney	R/R	6 ft 2 in (1.88 m)	200 lb (91 kg)	RS Sr	Paris Junior College	Muenster, Texas
17	LHP	Jackson Smeltz	L/L	6 ft 3 in (1.91 m)	210 lb (95 kg)	RS Fr	McCutcheon H. S.	Lafayette, Indiana
18	OF	Miles Simington	L/L	5 ft 9 in (1.75 m)	220 lb (100 kg)	Jr	Heartland Community College	Bloomington, Illinois
19	INF	Justin Fugitt	L/R	6 ft 1 in (1.85 m)	175 lb (79 kg)	RS So	Hilliard Darby H. S.	Hilliard, Ohio
20	INF	Kyle LaPlante	R/R	6 ft 3 in (1.91 m)	185 lb (84 kg)	Jr	Niagara County Community College	Lancaster, New York
22	C	Bryce Bonner	R/R	5 ft 9 in (1.75 m)	180 lb (82 kg)	Sr	Jesuit College Preparatory School of Dallas	Katy, Texas
23	INF	Zach Daugherty	R/R	6 ft 2 in (1.88 m)	185 lb (84 kg)	Fr	Huntington North H. S.	Huntington, Indiana
25	OF	Milo Beam	L/L	6 ft 3 in (1.91 m)	170 lb (77 kg)	Sr	Westfield H. S.	Westfield, Indiana
26	RHP	Grant Brunt	R/R	5 ft 11 in (1.8 m)	205 lb (93 kg)	RS Fr	Chesterton H. S.	Chesterton, Indiana
27	OF	Jack Firestone	L/R	6 ft 2 in (1.88 m)	195 lb (88 kg)	Fr	Zionsville Community H. S.	Zionsville, Indiana
28	LHP	James Kulak	L/L	6 ft 3 in (1.91 m)	175 lb (79 kg)	So	Neuqua Valley H. S.	Naperville, Illinois
29	C	Blake Schmitt	L/R	6 ft 0 in (1.83 m)	200 lb (91 kg)	So	Fred J. Page H. S.	Franklin, Tennessee
30	OF	Mike Bolton Jr.	L/R	5 ft 9 in (1.75 m)	155 lb (70 kg)	Fr	Brother Rice H. S.	Calumet City, Illinois
31	RHP	Conner Tomasic	R/R	6 ft 0 in (1.83 m)	175 lb (79 kg)	So	LakeCentral H. S.	Schererville, Indiana
32	OF	Johnny Sage	L/R	5 ft 10 in (1.78 m)	185 lb (84 kg)	Sr	Yakima Valley College	Spokane, Washington
33	C	Luke Houin	R/R	6 ft 0 in (1.83 m)	205 lb (93 kg)	RS Fr	St. Joseph H. S.	Plymouth, Indiana
34	RHP	Andrew Bohm	R/R	6 ft 1.5 in (1.87 m)	227 lb (103 kg)	RS Jr	Hamilton Southeastern H. S.	Fishers, Indiana
35	OF	Ben Nisle	R/R	6 ft 2 in (1.88 m)	200 lb (91 kg)	Jr	Lake Central H. S.	Schererville, Indiana
36	RHP	Trent Johnson	R/R	6 ft 2 in (1.88 m)	190 lb (86 kg)	Jr	Crawfordsville H. S.	Crawfordsville, Indiana
37	RHP	Reece Rodabaugh	R/R	6 ft 3 in (1.91 m)	200 lb (91 kg)	Fr	Cass H. S.	Walton, Indiana
38	RHP	Kyle Wade	R/R	6 ft 2 in (1.88 m)	225 lb (102 kg)	So	Kokomo H. S.	Kokomo, Indiana
40	RHP	Dalton Parker	R/R	6 ft 4 in (1.93 m)	216 lb (98 kg)	Sr	St. Joseph-Ogden H. S.	St. Joseph, Illinois
41	RHP	Ricky Castro	R/R	6 ft 1 in (1.85 m)	195 lb (88 kg)	RS So	Parkland College	Naperville, Illinois
42	LHP	Matt Moore	L/L	6 ft 3 in (1.91 m)	219 lb (99 kg)	RS Jr	Avon H. S.	Avon, Indiana
43	RHP	Knolton Clark	R/R	6 ft 3 in (1.91 m)	205 lb (93 kg)	Fr	Servite H. S.	Santa Ana, California
44	INF	Jake Parr	R/R	6 ft 7 in (2.01 m)	210 lb (95 kg)	Fr	Buckhorn H. S.	New Market, Alabama
45	RHP	Jett Jackson	R/R	6 ft 4 in (1.93 m)	180 lb (82 kg)	Fr	Dickson County H. S.	Burns, Tennessee
46	INF	Tyler Brandenburg	R/R	6 ft 4 in (1.93 m)	230 lb (104 kg)	Fr	Lake Country Lutheran H. S.	Saukville, Wisconsin
47	RHP	Eric Hildebrand	R/R	6 ft 0 in (1.83 m)	170 lb (77 kg)	Fr	Anchor Bay H. S.	Chesterfield, Michigan
48	RHP	Bo Hofstra	R/R	6 ft 5 in (1.96 m)	238 lb (108 kg)	Jr	Illiana Christian H. S.	Schererville, Indiana
49	RHP	Jake Lautenschlager	R/R	6 ft 4 in (1.93 m)	205 lb (93 kg)	Fr	West Vigo H. S.	Terre Haute, Indiana
50	C	Owen Walbaum	L/R	6 ft 0 in (1.83 m)	180 lb (82 kg)	Fr	West Lafayette H. S.	West Lafayette, Indiana

Head coach

39 Greg Goff

Assistant coach(es)

Hitting coach(es)

11 Cooper Fouts

Base coach(es)

1 Harry Shipley

Pitching coach(es)

21 Chris Marx

Legend

- (C) Team captain
- (S) Suspended
- (I) Ineligible
- Injured
- Current redshirt

Roster
Last update: January 26, 2020

== Schedule ==
2020 Purdue Boilermakers baseball game log
Regular season
February (6–3)

#	Date	Opponent	Site/stadium	Score	Win	Loss	Save	Attendance	Overall record	B1G record
1	February 14	vs Hofstra	Historic Sanford Memorial Stadium • Sanford, Florida,	9–6	Parker (1–0)	Joyce (0–1)	Hofstra (1)	156	1–0	–
2	February 15	vs Hofstra	Historic Sanford Memorial Stadium • Sanford, Florida	6–13	Hall (1–0)	Tomasic (0–1)	None	259	1–1	–
3	February 15	vs Hofstra	Historic Sanford Memorial Stadium • Sanford, Florida	10–4	Brooks (1–0)	Mundy (0–1)	None	259	2–1	–
4	February 16	vs Hofstra	Historic Sanford Memorial Stadium • Sanford, Florida	10–9	Wade (1–0)	Skidmore (0–1)	Hoftstra (2)	252	3–1	–
5	February 21	at Campbell	Jim Perry Stadium • Buies Creek, North Carolina,	6–4	Johnson (1–0)	Cowan (0–2)	Hofstra (3)	506	4–1	–
6	February 22	vs Maine	Jim Perry Stadium • Buies Creek, North Carolina	6–2	Brooks (2–0)	Pushard (0–1)	Bohm (1)	273	5–1	–
7	February 23	vs Villanova	Jim Perry Stadium • Buies Creek, North Carolina	7–1	Smeltz (1–0)	Siegenthaler (0–1)	None	158	6–1	–
8	February 28	vs #14 Duke	U.S. Bank Stadium • Minneapolis, Minnesota,	1–5	Jarvis (2–1)	Johnson (0–1)	None	–	6–2	–
9	February 29	vs #8 NC State	U.S. Bank Stadium • Minneapolis, Minnesota	0–6	Swiney (3–0)	Brooks (2–1)	None	–	6–3	–

March (1–4)

#	Date	Opponent	Site/stadium	Score	Win	Loss	Save	Attendance	Overall record	B1G record
10	March 1	vs #23 North Carolina	U.S. Bank Stadium • Minneapolis, Minnesota	5–6	Mott (2–0)	Hildebrand (0–1)	None	–	6–4	–
11	March 4	at Indiana	Bart Kaufman Field • Bloomington, Indiana	2–17	Krueger (1–0)	Bohm (0–1)	None	1,668	6–5	–
12	March 6	at Western Kentucky	Nick Denes Field • Bowling Green, Kentucky,	3–8	Hicks (2–1)	Hofstra (0–1)	Kates (1)	213	6–6	–
13	March 7	at Western Kentucky	Nick Denes Field • Bowling Green, Kentucky	2–11	Bergeron (2–0)	Brooks (2–2)	None	403	6–7	–
14	March 8	at Western Kentucky	Nick Denes Field • Bowling Green, Kentucky	19–1	Jackson (1–0)	Shoemake (2–1)	None	438	7–7	–
15	March 13	at Evansville	Charles H. Braun Stadium • Evansville, Indiana	Canceled (COVID-19 pandemic)						
16	March 14	at Evansville	Charles H. Braun Stadium • Evansville, Indiana	Canceled (COVID-19 pandemic)						
17	March 15	at Evansville	Charles H. Braun Stadium • Evansville, Indiana	Canceled (COVID-19 pandemic)						
18	March 17	Milwaukee	Alexander Field • West Lafayette, Indiana	Canceled (COVID-19 pandemic)						
19	March 18	Iona	Alexander Field • West Lafayette, Indiana	Canceled (COVID-19 pandemic)						
20	March 20	at Michigan	Ray Fisher Stadium • Ann Arbor, Michigan,	Canceled (COVID-19 pandemic)						
21	March 21	at Michigan	Ray Fisher Stadium • Ann Arbor, Michigan	Canceled (COVID-19 pandemic)						
22	March 22	at Michigan	Ray Fisher Stadium • Ann Arbor, Michigan	Canceled (COVID-19 pandemic)						
23	March 24	Purdue Fort Wayne	Alexander Field • West Lafayette, Indiana	Canceled (COVID-19 pandemic)						
24	March 25	at Indiana State	Bob Warn Field at Sycamore Stadium • Terre Haute, Indiana	Canceled (COVID-19 pandemic)						
25	March 27	Illinois	Alexander Field • West Lafayette, Indiana	Canceled (COVID-19 pandemic)						
26	March 28	Illinois	Alexander Field • West Lafayette, Indiana	Canceled (COVID-19 pandemic)						
27	March 28	Illinois	Alexander Field • West Lafayette, Indiana	Canceled (COVID-19 pandemic)						
28	March 31	Valparaiso	Alexander Field • West Lafayette, Indiana	Canceled (COVID-19 pandemic)						

April (0–0)

#	Date	Opponent	Site/stadium	Score	Win	Loss	Save	Attendance	Overall record	B1G record
29	April 3	at Iowa	Duane Banks Field • Iowa City, Iowa	Canceled (COVID-19 pandemic)						
30	April 4	at Iowa	Duane Banks Field • Iowa City, Iowa	Canceled (COVID-19 pandemic)						
31	April 5	at Iowa	Duane Banks Field • Iowa City, Iowa	Canceled (COVID-19 pandemic)						
32	April 7	at Ball State	Ball Diamond • Muncie, Indiana	Canceled (COVID-19 pandemic)						
33	April 10	Nebraska	Alexander Field • West Lafayette, Indiana	Canceled (COVID-19 pandemic)						
34	April 11	Nebraska	Alexander Field • West Lafayette, Indiana	Canceled (COVID-19 pandemic)						
35	April 12	Nebraska	Alexander Field • West Lafayette, Indiana	Canceled (COVID-19 pandemic)						
36	April 14	Butler	Alexander Field • West Lafayette, Indiana	Canceled (COVID-19 pandemic)						
37	April 17	Samford	Alexander Field • West Lafayette, Indiana	Canceled (COVID-19 pandemic)						
38	April 18	Samford	Alexander Field • West Lafayette, Indiana	Canceled (COVID-19 pandemic)						
39	April 19	Samford	Alexander Field • West Lafayette, Indiana	Canceled (COVID-19 pandemic)						
40	April 21	Ball State	Alexander Field • West Lafayette, Indiana	Canceled (COVID-19 pandemic)						
41	April 22	vs Butler	Victory Field • Indianapolis, Indiana	Canceled (COVID-19 pandemic)						
42	April 24	at Minnesota	Siebert Field • Minneapolis, Minnesota	Canceled (COVID-19 pandemic)						
43	April 25	at Minnesota	Siebert Field • Minneapolis, Minnesota	Canceled (COVID-19 pandemic)						
44	April 26	at Minnesota	Siebert Field • Minneapolis, Minnesota	Canceled (COVID-19 pandemic)						
45	April 28	Chicago State	Alexander Field • West Lafayette, Indiana	Canceled (COVID-19 pandemic)						

May (0–0)

#	Date	Opponent	Site/stadium	Score	Win	Loss	Save	Attendance	Overall record	B1G record
46	May 1	Maryland	Alexander Field • West Lafayette, Indiana	Canceled (COVID-19 pandemic)						
47	May 2	Maryland	Alexander Field • West Lafayette, Indiana	Canceled (COVID-19 pandemic)						
48	May 3	Maryland	Alexander Field • West Lafayette, Indiana	Canceled (COVID-19 pandemic)						
49	May 8	Indiana	Alexander Field • West Lafayette, Indiana	Canceled (COVID-19 pandemic)						
50	May 9	Indiana	Alexander Field • West Lafayette, Indiana	Canceled (COVID-19 pandemic)						
51	May 10	Indiana	Alexander Field • West Lafayette, Indiana	Canceled (COVID-19 pandemic)						
52	May 12	at Milwaukee	Routine Field • Franklin, Wisconsin	Canceled (COVID-19 pandemic)						
53	May 14	at Michigan State	Drayton McLane Baseball Stadium at John H. Kobs Field • East Lansing, Michigan,	Canceled (COVID-19 pandemic)						
54	May 15	at Michigan State	Drayton McLane Baseball Stadium at John H. Kobs Field • East Lansing, Michigan	Canceled (COVID-19 pandemic)						
55	May 16	at Michigan State	Drayton McLane Baseball Stadium at John H. Kobs Field • East Lansing, Michigan	Canceled (COVID-19 pandemic)						
