= Jordan Brewer =

American baseball player (born 1997)

Loco Beach Coconuts – No. 15
- Outfielder
- Born: August 1, 1997 (age 28); St. Joseph, Michigan, U.S.
- Bats: Right Throws: Right

Jordan Austin Brewer (born August 1, 1997) is an American professional baseball outfielder for the Loco Beach Coconuts of the Banana Ball Championship League.

== Amateur career ==
Brewer was born and grew up in St. Joseph, Michigan, and attended St. Joseph High School, where he played baseball, basketball and football. In football, Brewer was named All-State as a wide receiver and committed to join the Michigan Wolverines football team as a preferred walk-on before he was forced to end his football career after dislocating his shoulder for a second time.

Brewer began his collegiate baseball career at Lincoln Trail College after receiving a scholarship to play at the school. He was named first team All-Great Rivers Athletic Conference after batting .368 with nine home runs, 42 RBI, and 45 runs scored as a freshman and repeated as a first team selection as a sophomore after hitting .367 with three home runs, 31 RBI, and 38 runs scored. Brewer committed to continue his collegiate career at Michigan. He batted .329 with 12 home runs and 59 RBI with 25 stolen bases and was named the Big Ten Conference Baseball Player of the Year as the Wolverines went to the 2019 College World Series final.

== Professional career ==
=== Houston Astros ===
Brewer was drafted by the Houston Astros in the third round, with the 106th overall selection, of the 2019 Major League Baseball draft. He signed with the team and was assigned to the Tri-City ValleyCats of the Low–A New York–Penn League with whom he batted .130 over 16 games.

Brewer did not play in a game in 2020 due to the cancellation of the minor league season because of the COVID-19 pandemic. He spent the 2021 season with the Fayetteville Woodpeckers of the Low-A East, slashing .275/.375/.410 with six home runs, 41 RBI, and 21 stolen bases. Brewer split the 2022 campaign between the High–A Asheville Tourists and Double–A Corpus Christi Hooks. In 55 games for the two affiliates, he slashed .216/.332/.368 with six home runs, 24 RBI, and 11 stolen bases.

Brewer spent the majority of the 2023 season with Corpus Christi, also appearing in 4 games for Asheville. In 67 games for the Hooks, he batted .243/.330/.393 with a career–high 8 home runs, 39 RBI, and 12 stolen bases. Brewer began 2024 with Corpus Christi, slashing .224/.305/.363 with seven home runs, 31 RBI, and 10 stolen bases across 84 games. Brewer was released by the Astros organization on August 5, 2024.

=== Loco Beach Coconuts ===
On November 13, 2025, Brewer was selected by the Loco Beach Coconuts in the inaugural Banana Ball draft.
