= J. J. Isaacson Field at Seymour Smith Park =

- Interactive map of J. J. Isaacson Field at Seymour Smith Park
- Location: 6802 Harrison St; Omaha, NE 68127
- Coordinates: 41.3231895°N 96.0406776335808°W
- Operator: City of Omaha
- Capacity: 1,000
- Surface: Grass
- Field size: Left Field: 325 feet (99 m); Center Field: 410 feet (120 m); Right Field: 325 feet (99 m)

Construction
- Opened: 1961

Tenant
- Omaha Mavericks baseball (NCAA DI Summit) (2017–2020)

J. J. Isaacson Field at Seymour Smith Park is a 1,000-seat baseball park in Omaha, Nebraska. It was home to the Omaha Mavericks baseball team of the NCAA Division I Summit League. The venue has a capacity of 1,000 spectators.

== History ==
The ballpark was opened in 1961. On October 27, 2016, it was announced that the Omaha Mavericks baseball team would be moving a majority of their home games to Seymour Smith Park.

== Ballpark amenities ==
Press box, electronic scoreboard, field lights.

== See also ==
- Omaha Mavericks baseball
