= Jesse Franklin V =

American baseball player (born 1998)

Free agent
- Outfielder
- Born: December 1, 1998 (age 27); Seattle, Washington, U.S.
- Bats: Left Throws: Left

Jesse Owen Franklin V (born December 1, 1998) is an American professional baseball outfielder who is a free agent.

== Amateur career ==
Franklin attended Seattle Preparatory School in Seattle, Washington. Alongside baseball, he also played basketball and American football. During his sophomore baseball season in 2015, Franklin hit .532. In 2017, his senior year, he batted .571 with four home runs and was named Washington's Gatorade Baseball Player of the Year. He was selected by the Seattle Mariners in the 37th round of the 2017 Major League Baseball draft, but did not sign and instead enrolled at the University of Michigan where he played college baseball.

In 2018, Franklin's freshman year at Michigan, he appeared in 47 games in which he hit .327 with ten home runs and 47 RBI. He was named Player of the Week once and Freshman of the Week three times throughout the season. He played in the Cape Cod Baseball League for the Brewster Whitecaps that summer. As a sophomore in 2019, he batted .262 with 13 home runs and 55 RBI over 68 games. He returned to Brewster after the season's end. Franklin did not make an appearance during the 2020 season due to a collarbone injury and the season being cancelled due to the COVID-19 pandemic.

== Professional career ==
Franklin was drafted by the Atlanta Braves in the third round, with the 97th overall selection, of the 2020 Major League Baseball draft. He signed for $497,500, but did not play in a game after signing due to the cancellation of the minor league season because of the COVID-19 pandemic.

Franklin made his professional debut in 2021 with the Rome Braves of the High-A East, slashing .244/.320/.522 with 24 home runs, 61 RBI, and 19 stolen bases over 101 games. His 24 home runs were most among Atlanta minor leaguers and were also tied for first place in the league. Franklin was selected to play in the Arizona Fall League for the Peoria Javelinas after the season. He was assigned to the Mississippi Braves of the Double-A Southern League to begin the 2022 season. In early June, he underwent Tommy John surgery which forced him to miss the remainder of the season.

Franklin returned to action in 2023 with Mississippi, hitting .232 with 15 home runs and 46 RBI over 94 games. Franklin missed the entirety of the 2024 season due to shoulder tenditis. On January 29, 2025, Franklin was released by the Braves organization.
