= Chris Fetter =

American baseball coach (born 1985)

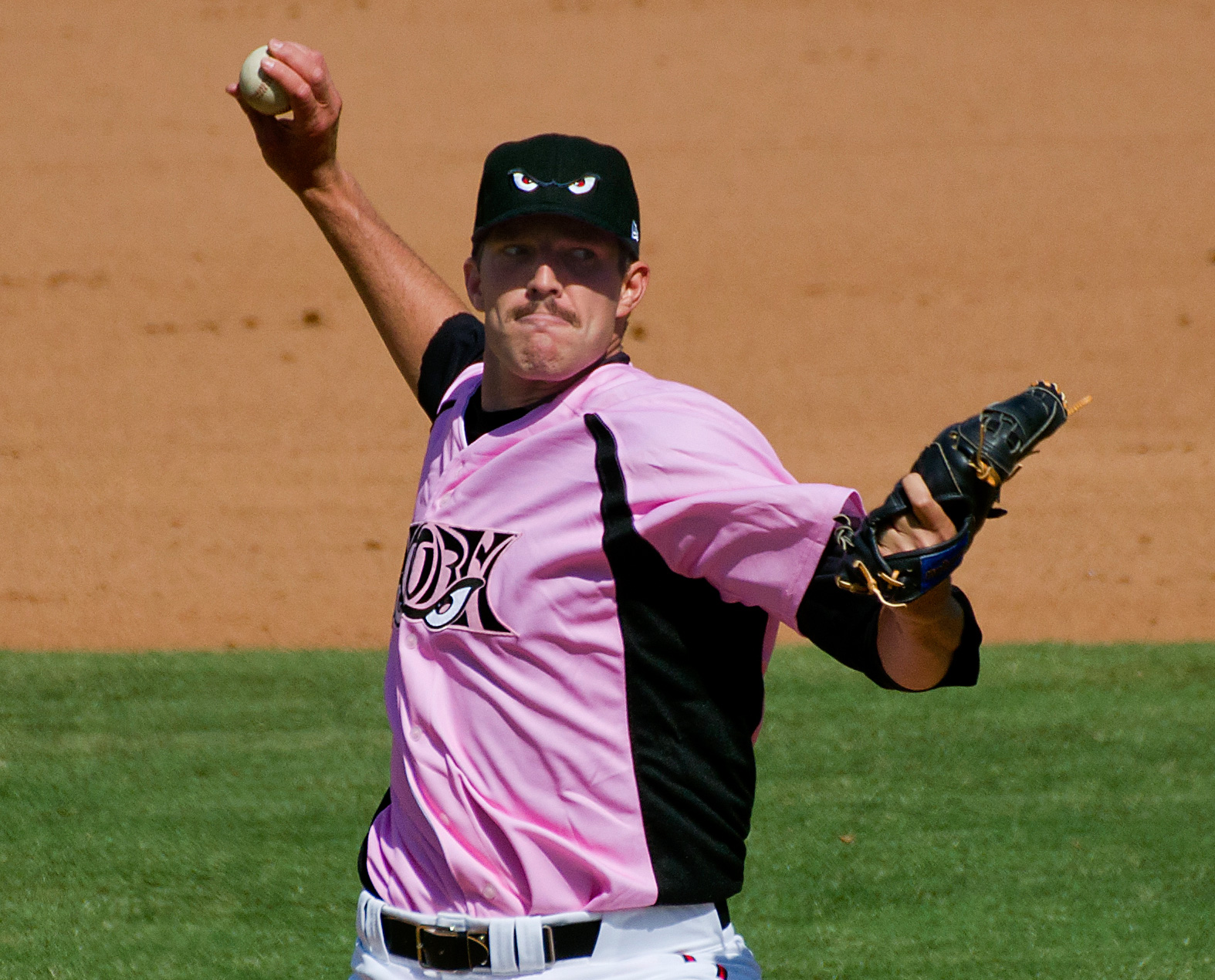
- Fetter with the Lake Elsinore Storm in 2011

Detroit Tigers – No. 41
- Pitching coach
- Born: December 23, 1985 (age 39); Carmel, Indiana
- Bats: Right Throws: Right

Teams
- As coach: Detroit Tigers (2021–present)

Christopher W. Fetter (born December 23, 1985) is an American professional baseball pitching coach for the Detroit Tigers of Major League Baseball.

== Early life and professional career ==
Fetter is from Carmel, Indiana. He attended the University of Michigan, where he played college baseball for the Michigan Wolverines. In 2007, he played collegiate summer baseball with the Cotuit Kettleers of the Cape Cod Baseball League. Fetter graduated in 2009. The San Diego Padres selected him in the ninth round of the 2009 MLB draft. He played in the minor leagues for four years in the Padres minor league system, reaching as high as the advanced Single-A Lake Elsinore Storm.

== Coaching career ==
He coached for the San Antonio Missions in 2013 before serving as a scout for the Los Angeles Angels for two years. He was the pitching coach for the Ball State Cardinals baseball team in 2016 before returning to Michigan as their pitching coach in 2017.

After the 2020 season, the Tigers hired Fetter as their pitching coach.

In June 2022, Fetter was rumored to potentially become the next head baseball coach at the University of Michigan. However, Fetter confirmed that he withdrew his name from consideration, and remains in MLB.

== Personal life ==
Fetter and his wife, Jessica, have a son and live in Huntington Woods, MI. His nickname in college was "Cheese".
