= Michael Brdar =

American baseball coach (born 1994)

Detroit Tigers – No. 90
- Coach
- Born: April 7, 1994 (age 32); Pleasanton, California, U.S.
- Stats at Baseball Reference

Teams
- As coach: San Diego Padres (2022); Detroit Tigers (2023–present)

Michael Joseph Brdar (born April 7, 1994) is an American professional baseball hitting coach for the Detroit Tigers of Major League Baseball (MLB). He has also coached in MLB for the San Diego Padres, and played professionally for the St. Louis Cardinals organization.

== Career ==
=== Playing career ===
Brdar attended De La Salle High School in Concord, California, and played for the school's baseball team. He enrolled at Diablo Valley College, where he began his college baseball career. He transferred to the University of Michigan to play for the Michigan Wolverines. The St. Louis Cardinals drafted him in the 36th round, with the 1,084th overall selection, of the 2017 Major League Baseball draft. He spent his first professional season with the rookie–level Gulf Coast League Cardinals, hitting .235/.330/.282 with 10 RBI. On January 18, 2018, Brdar retired from professional baseball.

=== Coaching career ===
Following Brdar's playing career, he spent two seasons as the hitting coordinator for the San Francisco Giants organization. After the 2021 season, the San Diego Padres hired Brdar as their hitting coach.

On November 16, 2022, after one season with the Padres, the Detroit Tigers hired Brdar to be their hitting coach.
