= 2020 Arizona State Sun Devils baseball team =

American college baseball season

2020 Arizona State Sun Devils baseball
- Conference: Pac-12 Conference

Ranking
- Coaches: No. 10
- CB: No. 8
- Record: 13–4 (0–0 Pac-12)
- Head coach: Tracy Smith (6th season)
- Assistant coaches: Ben Greenspan (4th season); Jason Kelly (1st season); Michael Earley (4th season)
- Home stadium: Phoenix Municipal Stadium

2020 Pac-12 Conference baseball standings
	Conf.				Overall
Team	W		L	PCT	W		L	PCT
No. 5 UCLA ‍‍‍	0	–	0	–	13	–	2	.867
No. 9 Arizona State ‍‍‍	0	–	0	–	13	–	4	.765
Arizona ‍‍‍	0	–	0	–	10	–	5	.667
USC ‍‍‍	0	–	0	–	10	–	5	.667
Washington ‍‍‍	0	–	0	–	9	–	6	.600
Washington State ‍‍‍	0	–	0	–	9	–	7	.563
Oregon ‍‍‍	0	–	0	–	8	–	7	.533
Utah ‍‍‍	0	–	0	–	6	–	7	.462
Oregon State ‍‍‍	0	–	0	–	5	–	9	.357
Stanford ‍‍‍	0	–	0	–	5	–	11	.313
California ‍‍‍	0	–	0	–	5	–	11	.313
† – Conference champion y – Invited to the NCAA tournament As of March 12, 2020; Rankings from D1Baseball

The 2020 Arizona State Sun Devils baseball team represented Arizona State University in the 2020 NCAA Division I baseball season. The Sun Devils played their home games at Phoenix Municipal Stadium, off campus in Phoenix, Arizona. It was Tracy Smith's sixth season as head coach.

Due to the COVID-19 pandemic, on March 30, 2020, the NCAA canceled the upcoming College World Series, but announced that senior spring athletes would have the opportunity to return to school for the 2021 spring season if they wished.

== Personnel ==
=== Roster ===
2020 Arizona State Sun Devils roster
Pitchers: 3 - Dom Cacchione - Sophomore; 4 - Luke La Flam - Sophomore; 11 - RJ Dabovich - Junior; 12 - Cooper Benson - Freshman; 15 - Erik Tolman - Sophomore; 19 - Boyd Vander Kooi - Junior; 22 - Blaze Burzell - Sophomore; 23 - Justin Fall - Junior; 24 - Nick Wallerstedt - Freshman; 25 - Will Levine - Sophomore; 26 - Graham Osman - Freshman; 29 - Tyler Thornton - Sophomore; 30 - Brady Corrigan - Junior; 32 - Bryce Barnett - Freshman; 36 - Seth Tomczak - Freshman; 40 - Alexander Ogg - Freshman; 41 - Christian Bodlovich - Freshman; 43 - Danny Marshall - Freshman; 45 - Cam Dennie - Freshman	Catchers: 8 - Nick Cheema - Senior; 9 - Sam Ferri - Senior; Infielders: 5 - Alika Williams - Junior; 6 - Drew Swift - Junior; 14 - Gage Workman - Junior; 20 - Spencer Torkelson - Junior; 46 - Nathan Baez - Freshman; 48 - Brian Kalmer - Freshman	Outfielders: 10 - Dusty Garcia - Sophomore; 17 - Myles Denson - Senior; 18 - Trevor Hauver - Junior; 27 - Hunter Jump - Junior; 35 - Sean McLain - Freshman; 37 - Alex Helmin - Freshman; 38 - Seth Nager - Freshman

=== Coaching staff ===
2020 Arizona State Sun Devils coaching staff
Name	Position
Tracy Smith	Head coach
Ben Greenspan	Associate head coach/recruiting coordinator
Jason Kelly	Assistant Coach/Pitching Coach
Michael Earley	Assistant Coach/Hitting Coach
David Greer	Undergraduate Student Assistant Coach
Jesse Lowman	Athletic Trainer
Jason Robbins	Strength and Conditioning
Armando Flores	Director of Community Relations
Danny Stolper	Director of Operations
Jon Erwin	Academic Coach
Paul Lopez	Equipment operations coordinator
Caleb Longley	Director of Hitting Development and Analytics

== Schedule and results ==
Legend
	ASU win
	ASU loss
	Postponement
**Bold**	Arizona State team member

2020 Arizona State Sun Devils baseball game log
Regular season (13–4)
February (8–3)

Date	Opponent	Rank	Site/Stadium	Score	Win	Loss	Save	TV	Attendance	Overall Record	Pac-12 Record
Feb. 14	vs. Villanova	#5	Phoenix Municipal Stadium • Phoenix, AZ	4–1	**Levine**	Kingsbury	**Dabovich**	ASU Live Stream	2,311	1–0	-
Feb. 15	vs. Villanova	#5	Phoenix Municipal Stadium • Phoenix, AZ	1–2	Graceffo	**Vander–Kooi**		ASU Live Stream		1–1	-
Feb. 15	vs. #10 Michigan	#5	Phoenix Municipal Stadium • Phoenix, AZ	0–5	Hajjar	**Benson**	White	ASU Live Stream	4,740	1–2	-
Feb. 16	vs. Villanova	#5	Phoenix Municipal Stadium • Phoenix, AZ	6–4	**Osman**	Arella	Osman	ASU Live Stream	2,399	2–2	-
Feb. 18	vs. #28 Oklahoma State	#11	Phoenix Municipal Stadium • Phoenix, AZ	1–2	Standlee	**Tolman**	Leeper	ASU Live Stream	2,403	2–3	-
Feb. 21	vs. Boston College	#11	Phoenix Municipal Stadium • Phoenix, AZ	10–4	**Vander–Kooi**	Pelio		ASU Live Stream	2,509	3–3	-
Feb. 22	vs. Boston College	#11	Phoenix Municipal Stadium • Phoenix, AZ	8–4	**Thornton**	Mancini	**Dabovich**	ASU Live Stream		4–3	-
Feb. 23	vs. Boston College	#11	Phoenix Municipal Stadium • Phoenix, AZ	8–4	**Dennie**	Walsh		ASU Live Stream		5–3	-
Feb. 25	vs. New Mexico State	#12	Phoenix Municipal Stadium • Phoenix, AZ	6-5				ASU Live Stream		6-3	-
Feb. 28	vs. Nebraska	#12	Phoenix Municipal Stadium • Phoenix, AZ	13-5				ASU Live Stream		7-3	-
Feb. 29	vs. Nebraska	#12	Phoenix Municipal Stadium • Phoenix, AZ	14-1				ASU Live Stream		8-3	-

March (5–1)

Date	Opponent	Rank	Site/Stadium	Score	Win	Loss	Save	TV	Attendance	Overall Record	Pac-12 Record
Mar. 1	vs. Nebraska	#12	Phoenix Municipal Stadium • Phoenix, AZ	10-18				ASU Live Stream		8-4	-
Mar. 3	at. Cal State		Goodwin Field • Fullerton, CA	12-2				Big West TV		9-4	-
Mar. 4	at. Cal State		Goodwin Field • Fullerton, CA	9-3				Big West TV		10-4	-
Mar. 6	vs. Fresno State		Phoenix Municipal Stadium • Phoenix, AZ	4-3				ASU Live Stream		11-4	-
Mar. 7	vs. Fresno State		Phoenix Municipal Stadium • Phoenix, AZ	9-4				ASU Live Stream		12-4	-
Mar. 8	vs. Fresno State		Phoenix Municipal Stadium • Phoenix, AZ	8-3				ASU Live Stream		13-4	-
Mar. 10	vs. Arizona	**Canceled**	Phoenix Municipal Stadium • Phoenix, AZ								-
Mar. 13	vs. Utah	**Canceled**	Phoenix Municipal Stadium • Phoenix, AZ								-
Mar. 14	vs. Utah	**Canceled**	Phoenix Municipal Stadium • Phoenix, AZ								-
Mar. 15	vs. Utah	**Canceled**	Phoenix Municipal Stadium • Phoenix, AZ								-
Mar. 20	at. Oregon State	**Canceled**	Goss Stadium at Coleman Field • Corvallis, OR								-
Mar. 21	at. Oregon State	**Canceled**	Goss Stadium at Coleman Field • Corvallis, OR								-
Mar. 22	at. Oregon State	**Canceled**	Goss Stadium at Coleman Field • Corvallis, OR								-
Mar. 27	at. Stanford	**Canceled**	Klein Field at Sunken Diamond • Stanford, CA								-
Mar. 28	at. Stanford	**Canceled**	Klein Field at Sunken Diamond • Stanford, CA								-
Mar. 29	at. Stanford	**Canceled**	Klein Field at Sunken Diamond • Stanford, CA								-
Mar. 31	at. Santa Clara	**Canceled**	Stephen Schott Stadium • Santa Clara, CA								-

April (0–0)

Date	Opponent	Rank	Site/Stadium	Score	Win	Loss	Save	TV	Attendance	Overall Record	Pac-12 Record
Apr. 3	vs. Washington	Canceled	Phoenix Municipal Stadium • Phoenix, AZ								-
Apr. 4	vs. Washington	Canceled	Phoenix Municipal Stadium • Phoenix, AZ								-
Apr. 5	vs. Washington	Canceled	Phoenix Municipal Stadium • Phoenix, AZ								-
Apr. 7	vs. Grand Canyon	Canceled	Phoenix Municipal Stadium • Phoenix, AZ								-
Apr. 9	vs. California	Canceled	Phoenix Municipal Stadium • Phoenix, AZ								-
Apr. 10	vs. California	Canceled	Phoenix Municipal Stadium • Phoenix, AZ								-
Apr. 11	vs. California	Canceled	Phoenix Municipal Stadium • Phoenix, AZ								-
Apr. 15	at. Long Beach State	Canceled	Blair Field • Long Beach, CA								-
Apr. 17	at. UCLA	Canceled	Jackie Robinson Stadium • Los Angeles, CA								-
Apr. 18	at. UCLA	Canceled	Jackie Robinson Stadium • Los Angeles, CA								-
Apr. 19	at. UCLA	Canceled	Jackie Robinson Stadium • Los Angeles, CA								-
Apr. 21	at. Grand Canyon	Canceled	Brazell Field at GCU Ballpark • Phoenix, AZ								-
Apr. 24	at. Arizona	Canceled	Hi Corbett Field • Tucson, AZ								-
Apr. 25	at. Arizona	Canceled	Hi Corbett Field • Tucson, AZ								-
Apr. 26	at. Arizona	Canceled	Hi Corbett Field • Tucson, AZ								-
Apr. 28	at. UNLV	Canceled	Earl Wilson Stadium • Paradise, NV								-

May (0–0)

Date	Opponent	Rank	Site/Stadium	Score	Win	Loss	Save	TV	Attendance	Overall Record	Pac-12 Record
May. 1	at. USC	Canceled	Phoenix Municipal Stadium • Phoenix, AZ								-
May. 2	at. USC	Canceled	Phoenix Municipal Stadium • Phoenix, AZ								-
May. 3	at. USC	Canceled	Phoenix Municipal Stadium • Phoenix, AZ								-
May. 8	vs. Washington State	Canceled	Bailey–Brayton Field • Pullman, WA								-
May. 9	vs. Washington State	Canceled	Bailey–Brayton Field • Pullman, WA								-
May. 10	vs. Washington State	Canceled	Bailey–Brayton Field • Pullman, WA								-
May. 15	at. Oregon	Canceled	Phoenix Municipal Stadium • Phoenix, AZ								-
May. 16	at. Oregon	Canceled	Phoenix Municipal Stadium • Phoenix, AZ								-
May. 17	at. Oregon	Canceled	Phoenix Municipal Stadium • Phoenix, AZ								-
May. 21	at. UC Riverside	Canceled	Phoenix Municipal Stadium • Phoenix, AZ								-
May. 22	at. UC Riverside	Canceled	Phoenix Municipal Stadium • Phoenix, AZ								-
May. 23	at. UC Riverside	Canceled	Phoenix Municipal Stadium • Phoenix, AZ								-

== Rankings ==
Ranking movements Legend: ██ Increase in ranking ██ Decrease in ranking
	Week																		
Poll	Pre	1	2	3	4	5	6	7	8	9	10	11	12	13	14	15	16	17	Final
Coaches'	13	13*		13															
Baseball America	3	8	8	8															
Collegiate Baseball^	5	11	12	10															
NCBWA†	7	14	11	9															
D1Baseball	9	13	12	10															

^ Collegiate Baseball ranked 40 teams in their preseason poll, but only ranked 30 teams weekly during the season.
† NCBWA ranks 30 teams in their preseason poll, but only ranks 25 teams weekly during the season.
* A new poll was not released for this week, so for comparison purposes, the previous week's ranking is inserted in this week's slot.

== 2020 MLB draft ==
Round	Pick	Player	Position	MLB Team
1	1	Spencer Torkelson	First/Third baseman	Detroit Tigers
CBA Round A	37	Alika Williams	Shortstop	Tampa Bay Rays
3	99	Trevor Hauver	Second baseman	New York Yankees
4	102	Gage Workman	Third baseman	Detroit Tigers
4	114	R. J. Dabovich	Pitcher	San Francisco Giants
