= 2020 NCAA Division I baseball season =

Baseball season

- Duration: February 14–March 12, 2020
- Number of teams: 300
- Preseason No. 1: Louisville (CB, D1B); Vanderbilt (BA)
- Defending champions: Vanderbilt
- TV partner/s: ESPN

Tournament
- Duration: not held

College World Series
- Duration: not held

Seasons
- ← 2019 2021 →

The 2020 NCAA Division I baseball season, play of college baseball in the United States organized by the National Collegiate Athletic Association (NCAA) at the Division I level, began on February 14, 2020. On March 12, it was announced that the 2020 NCAA tournament would be canceled due to the coronavirus pandemic. The decision whether to continue with an abbreviated season was left to individual schools and conferences.

== Realignment ==
- Akron restarted its program within the Mid-American Conference. Akron previously dropped baseball after the 2015 season.
- Savannah State moved all sports to NCAA Division II, departing the Mid-Eastern Athletic Conference and returning to its former home of the Southern Intercollegiate Athletic Conference.
- Boise State restarted its program within the Mountain West Conference, but dropped it again in July due to a reduction in the athletic department's budget. Boise State previously dropped baseball after the 1980 season.
- Merrimack upgraded all sports, including baseball, to NCAA Division I from NCAA Division II, joining the Northeast Conference.

=== Format changes ===
- The MEAC dissolved its divisions.

== Ballpark changes ==
- The 2020 season was to be the first for UConn at Elliot Ballpark, replacing J. O. Christian Field. The team was originally scheduled to play its first game there on March 29 against Seton Hall.
- Oklahoma State originally planned to inaugurate O'Brate Stadium on March 20, 2020, replacing Allie P. Reynolds Stadium after the first 14 home games of the 2020 season. The first scheduled game at the new ballpark was against the TCU Horned Frogs. Oklahoma State's season was canceled on March 13.
- The 2020 season was the last for Florida at McKethan Stadium, before the season was canceled on March 17. The team's last game at the venue was on March 10, a loss against the rival Florida State Seminoles.
- The 2020 season was expected to be the last that Marshall would play off-campus. The Thundering Herd scheduled most of its 2020 home games at Kennedy Center Field, part of a YMCA recreation camp about 7 miles from its Huntington, West Virginia campus; the remainder were at Appalachian Power Park in Charleston, West Virginia, more than 50 miles from campus. Ground was broken on a new on-campus ballpark in October 2019, and the new facility is scheduled to open for 2021.

== Season outlook ==
ESPN/USA Today Coaches
Ranking	Team
1	Vanderbilt
2	Louisville
3	Texas Tech
4	Georgia
5	Arkansas
6	Mississippi State
7	Miami (FL)
8	UCLA
9	Auburn
10	Florida
11	Michigan
12	LSU
13	Arizona State
14	Florida State
15	Stanford
16	North Carolina
17	Oklahoma State
18	NC State
19	East Carolina
20	Duke
21	Texas A&M
22	Georgia Tech
23	Ole Miss
24	Wake Forest
25	Oregon State

Collegiate Baseball News
Ranking	Team
1	Louisville
2	Vanderbilt
3	Texas Tech
4	Miami (FL)
5	Arizona State
6	Mississippi State
7	Georgia
8	Auburn
9	Arkansas
10	Michigan
11	LSU
12	UCLA
13	North Carolina
14	Florida
15	Florida State
16	NC State
17	Wake Forest
18	Arizona
19	Oklahoma State
20	TCU
21	Texas A&M
22	Texas
23	South Alabama
24	Louisiana
25	Stanford

D1Baseball
Ranking	Team
1	Louisville
2	Vanderbilt
3	Miami (FL)
4	Florida
5	Georgia
6	Texas Tech
7	Arkansas
8	Auburn
9	Arizona State
10	Mississippi State
11	LSU
12	Florida State
13	Michigan
14	UCLA
15	Duke
16	NC State
17	Stanford
18	Wake Forest
19	Georgia Tech
20	Texas A&M
21	East Carolina
22	Oklahoma State
23	North Carolina
24	Oklahoma
25	Ole Miss

Baseball America
Ranking	Team
1	Vanderbilt
2	Louisville
3	Arizona State
4	Florida
5	Miami (FL)
6	Texas Tech
7	Georgia
8	Michigan
9	Mississippi State
10	UCLA
11	Arkansas
12	Florida State
13	Auburn
14	LSU
15	Duke
16	Oklahoma State
17	NC State
18	North Carolina
19	Oklahoma
20	Wake Forest
21	Georgia Tech
22	Arizona
23	Dallas Baptist
24	Ohio State
25	East Carolina

NCBWA
Ranking	Team
1	Vanderbilt
2	Louisville
3	Texas Tech
4	Georgia
5	Miami (FL)
6	Arkansas
7	Arizona State
8	Florida
9	Mississippi State
10	Auburn
11	UCLA
12	Michigan
13	LSU
14	Florida State
15	Duke
16	Stanford
17	NC State
18	Oklahoma State
19	North Carolina
20	East Carolina
21	Texas A&M
22	Georgia Tech
23	Wake Forest
24	Oklahoma
25	Ole Miss

== Conference standings ==
2020 America East Conference baseball standings
	Conf.				Overall
Team	W		L	PCT	W		L	PCT
Albany ‍‍‍	0	–	0	–	7	–	5	.583
Hartford ‍‍‍	0	–	0	–	6	–	6	.500
Binghamton ‍‍‍	0	–	0	–	5	–	7	.417
Stony Brook ‍‍‍	0	–	0	–	6	–	9	.400
UMass Lowell ‍‍‍	0	–	0	–	4	–	11	.267
UMBC ‍‍‍	0	–	0	–	3	–	10	.231
Maine ‍‍‍	0	–	0	–	1	–	12	.077
‡ – Tournament champion As of March 12, 2020; Rankings from D1Baseball

2020 American Athletic Conference baseball standings
	Conf.				Overall
Team	W		L	PCT	W		L	PCT
No. 20 Tulane ‍‍‍	0	–	0	–	15	–	2	.882
Wichita State ‍‍‍	0	–	0	–	13	–	2	.867
No. 12 UCF ‍‍‍	0	–	0	–	15	–	3	.833
East Carolina ‍‍‍	0	–	0	–	13	–	4	.765
UConn ‍‍‍	0	–	0	–	8	–	5	.615
Memphis ‍‍‍	0	–	0	–	10	–	7	.588
Cincinnati ‍‍‍	0	–	0	–	7	–	8	.467
Houston ‍‍‍	0	–	0	–	6	–	9	.400
South Florida ‍‍‍	0	–	0	–	6	–	11	.353
‡ – Tournament champion As of March 12, 2020; Rankings from D1Baseball

2020 Atlantic 10 Conference baseball standings
	Conf.				Overall
Team	W		L	PCT	W		L	PCT
Davidson ‍‍‍	0	–	0	–	13	–	3	.813
Saint Louis ‍‍‍	0	–	0	–	10	–	6	.625
Fordham ‍‍‍	0	–	0	–	10	–	6	.625
Rhode Island ‍‍‍	0	–	0	–	8	–	5	.615
VCU ‍‍‍	0	–	0	–	9	–	8	.529
George Washington ‍‍‍	0	–	0	–	8	–	8	.500
Dayton ‍‍‍	0	–	0	–	6	–	8	.429
St. Bonaventure ‍‍‍	0	–	0	–	3	–	4	.429
La Salle ‍‍‍	0	–	0	–	5	–	9	.357
Saint Joseph's ‍‍‍	0	–	0	–	5	–	10	.333
Richmond ‍‍‍	0	–	0	–	5	–	12	.294
UMass ‍‍‍	0	–	0	–	1	–	8	.111
George Mason ‍‍‍	0	–	0	–	1	–	14	.067
† – Conference champion ‡ – Tournament champion y – Invited to the NCAA tournament As of March 12, 2020; Rankings from D1Baseball

2020 Atlantic Coast Conference baseball standings
	Conf.				Overall
Team	W		L	PCT	W		L	PCT
Atlantic
Notre Dame ‍‍‍	3	–	0	1.000	11	–	2	.846
No. 24 Clemson ‍‍‍	3	–	0	1.000	14	–	3	.824
No. 2 Louisville ‍‍‍	2	–	1	.667	13	–	4	.765
No. 11 NC State ‍‍‍	1	–	2	.333	14	–	3	.824
No. 15 Florida State ‍‍‍	1	–	2	.333	12	–	5	.706
Wake Forest ‍‍‍	1	–	2	.333	10	–	8	.556
Boston College ‍‍‍	0	–	3	.000	6	–	9	.400
Coastal
No. 7 Miami (FL) ‍‍‍	3	–	0	1.000	12	–	4	.750
Virginia ‍‍‍	2	–	1	.667	14	–	4	.778
No. 10 Duke ‍‍‍	2	–	1	.667	12	–	4	.750
Georgia Tech ‍‍‍	2	–	1	.667	11	–	5	.688
No. 25 Virginia Tech ‍‍‍	1	–	2	.333	11	–	5	.688
North Carolina ‍‍‍	0	–	3	.000	12	–	7	.632
Pittsburgh ‍‍‍	0	–	3	.000	10	–	6	.625
‡ – Tournament champion As of March 18, 2020; Rankings from D1Baseball

2020 ASUN Conference baseball standings
	Conf.				Overall
Team	W		L	PCT	W		L	PCT
Stetson ‍‍‍	0	–	0	–	11	–	4	.733
Lipscomb ‍‍‍	0	–	0	–	11	–	5	.688
Liberty ‍‍‍	0	–	0	–	10	–	7	.588
Florida Gulf Coast ‍‍‍	0	–	0	–	9	–	7	.563
Kennesaw State ‍‍‍	0	–	0	–	10	–	8	.556
Jacksonville ‍‍‍	0	–	0	–	9	–	9	.500
NJIT ‍‍‍	0	–	0	–	6	–	10	.375
North Florida ‍‍‍	0	–	0	–	4	–	12	.250
North Alabama ‍‍‍	0	–	0	–	3	–	13	.188
‡ – Tournament champion Rankings from D1Baseball

2020 Big East Conference baseball standings
	Conf.				Overall
Team	W		L	PCT	W		L	PCT
Villanova ‍‍‍	0	–	0	–	9	–	5	.643
Butler ‍‍‍	0	–	0	–	8	–	6	.571
Seton Hall ‍‍‍	0	–	0	–	6	–	8	.429
St. John's ‍‍‍	0	–	0	–	5	–	8	.385
Creighton ‍‍‍	0	–	0	–	4	–	7	.364
Xavier ‍‍‍	0	–	0	–	5	–	10	.333
Georgetown ‍‍‍	0	–	0	–	4	–	13	.235
‡ – Tournament champion As of March 12, 2020; Rankings from D1Baseball

2020 Big Ten Conference baseball standings
	Conf.				Overall
Team	W		L	PCT	W		L	PCT
Iowa ‍‍‍	0	–	0	–	10	–	5	.667
Maryland ‍‍‍	0	–	0	–	10	–	5	.667
Penn State ‍‍‍	0	–	0	–	10	–	5	.667
Illinois ‍‍‍	0	–	0	–	8	–	5	.615
Indiana ‍‍‍	0	–	0	–	9	–	6	.600
Michigan State ‍‍‍	0	–	0	–	9	–	6	.600
Michigan ‍‍‍	0	–	0	–	8	–	7	.533
Purdue ‍‍‍	0	–	0	–	7	–	7	.500
Northwestern ‍‍‍	0	–	0	–	6	–	6	.500
Nebraska ‍‍‍	0	–	0	–	7	–	8	.467
Minnesota ‍‍‍	0	–	0	–	8	–	10	.444
Ohio State ‍‍‍	0	–	0	–	6	–	8	.429
Rutgers ‍‍‍	0	–	0	–	6	–	9	.400
‡ – Tournament champion As of March 12, 2020; Rankings from D1Baseball

2020 Big 12 Conference baseball standings
	Conf.				Overall
Team	W		L	PCT	W		L	PCT
No. 3 Texas Tech ‍‍‍	0	–	0	–	16	–	3	.842
No. 22 Texas ‍‍‍	0	–	0	–	14	–	3	.824
No. 13 Oklahoma ‍‍‍	0	–	0	–	14	–	4	.778
TCU ‍‍‍	0	–	0	–	11	–	4	.733
Oklahoma State ‍‍‍	0	–	0	–	13	–	5	.722
West Virginia ‍‍‍	0	–	0	–	11	–	5	.688
Baylor ‍‍‍	0	–	0	–	10	–	6	.625
Kansas State ‍‍‍	0	–	0	–	10	–	7	.588
Kansas ‍‍‍	0	–	0	–	7	–	10	.412
‡ – Tournament champion As of March 15, 2020; Rankings from D1baseball

2020 Big South Conference baseball standings
	Conf.				Overall
Team	W		L	PCT	W		L	PCT
Winthrop ‍‍‍	0	–	0	–	11	–	4	.733
USC Upstate ‍‍‍	0	–	0	–	13	–	5	.722
Radford ‍‍‍	0	–	0	–	9	–	8	.529
Gardner–Webb ‍‍‍	0	–	0	–	8	–	8	.500
Campbell ‍‍‍	0	–	0	–	7	–	9	.438
High Point ‍‍‍	0	–	0	–	7	–	9	.438
Charleston Southern ‍‍‍	0	–	0	–	7	–	12	.368
UNC Asheville ‍‍‍	0	–	0	–	5	–	11	.313
Longwood ‍‍‍	0	–	0	–	4	–	13	.235
Presbyterian ‍‍‍	0	–	0	–	2	–	14	.125
‡ – Tournament champion As of March 12, 2020; Rankings from D1Baseball

2020 Big West Conference baseball standings
	Conf.				Overall
Team	W		L	PCT	W		L	PCT
No. 23 UC Santa Barbara ‍‍‍	0	–	0	–	13	–	2	.867
Cal State Northridge ‍‍‍	0	–	0	–	10	–	5	.667
No. 16 Long Beach State ‍‍‍	0	–	0	–	10	–	5	.667
Hawaii ‍‍‍	0	–	0	–	11	–	6	.647
UC Davis ‍‍‍	0	–	0	–	9	–	7	.563
UC Riverside ‍‍‍	0	–	0	–	9	–	7	.563
UC Irvine ‍‍‍	0	–	0	–	8	–	7	.533
Cal Poly ‍‍‍	0	–	0	–	5	–	11	.313
Cal State Fullerton ‍‍‍	0	–	0	–	4	–	12	.250
As of March 12, 2020; Rankings from D1Baseball

2020 Colonial Athletic Association baseball standings
	Conf.				Overall
Team	W		L	PCT	W		L	PCT
College of Charleston ‍‍‍	0	–	0	–	12	–	2	.857
UNC Wilmington ‍‍‍	0	–	0	–	11	–	5	.688
Northeastern ‍‍‍	0	–	0	–	10	–	5	.667
James Madison ‍‍‍	0	–	0	–	10	–	6	.625
Delaware ‍‍‍	0	–	0	–	8	–	7	.533
William & Mary ‍‍‍	0	–	0	–	8	–	9	.471
Towson ‍‍‍	0	–	0	–	7	–	8	.467
Elon ‍‍‍	0	–	0	–	7	–	10	.412
Hofstra ‍‍‍	0	–	0	–	4	–	10	.286
‡ – Tournament champion As of March 12, 2020; Rankings from D1Baseball

2020 Conference USA baseball standings
	Conf.						Overall
Team	W		L		T	PCT	W		L		T	PCT
Old Dominion ‍‍‍	0	–	0	–	0	–	12	–	4	–	0	.750
Southern Miss ‍‍‍	0	–	0	–	0	–	12	–	4	–	0	.750
FIU ‍‍‍	0	–	0	–	0	–	10	–	5	–	0	.667
Louisiana Tech ‍‍‍	0	–	0	–	0	–	11	–	6	–	0	.647
Florida Atlantic ‍‍‍	0	–	0	–	0	–	10	–	6	–	0	.625
Western Kentucky ‍‍‍	0	–	0	–	0	–	10	–	6	–	0	.625
UTSA ‍‍‍	0	–	0	–	0	–	10	–	7	–	0	.588
Charlotte ‍‍‍	0	–	0	–	0	–	9	–	8	–	0	.529
UAB ‍‍‍	0	–	0	–	0	–	7	–	9	–	0	.438
Middle Tennessee ‍‍‍	0	–	0	–	0	–	7	–	10	–	0	.412
Marshall ‍‍‍	0	–	0	–	0	–	4	–	10	–	1	.300
Rice ‍‍‍	0	–	0	–	0	–	2	–	14	–	0	.125
x – Division champion † – Conference champion ‡ – Tournament champion y – Invited to the NCAA tournament As of March 16, 2020; Rankings from D1Baseball

2020 Horizon League baseball standings
	Conf.				Overall
Team	W		L	PCT	W		L	PCT
Youngstown State ‍‍‍	0	–	0	–	7	–	7	.500
Wright State ‍‍‍	0	–	0	–	6	–	9	.400
UIC ‍‍‍	0	–	0	–	4	–	12	.250
Oakland ‍‍‍	0	–	0	–	2	–	8	.200
Milwaukee ‍‍‍	0	–	0	–	1	–	14	.067
Northern Kentucky ‍‍‍	0	–	0	–	0	–	17	.000
‡ – Tournament champion As of March 12, 2020; Rankings from D1Baseball

2020 Ivy League baseball standings
	Conf.				Overall
Team	W		L	PCT	W		L	PCT
Penn ‍‍‍	0	–	0	–	3	–	4	.429
Yale ‍‍‍	0	–	0	–	3	–	7	.300
Dartmouth ‍‍‍	0	–	0	–	2	–	5	.286
Brown ‍‍‍	0	–	0	–	3	–	9	.250
Harvard ‍‍‍	0	–	0	–	1	–	5	.167
Columbia ‍‍‍	0	–	0	–	1	–	7	.125
Cornell ‍‍‍	0	–	0	–	1	–	8	.111
Princeton ‍‍‍	0	–	0	–	0	–	7	.000
† – Conference champion ‡ – Championship series champion y – Invited to the NCAA tournanemt As of March 12, 2020; Rankings from D1Baseball

2020 Metro Atlantic Athletic Conference baseball standings
	Conf.						Overall
Team	W		L		T	PCT	W		L		T	PCT
Rider ‍‍‍	0	–	0	–	0	–	6	–	8	–	0	.429
Monmouth ‍‍‍	0	–	0	–	0	–	5	–	9	–	0	.357
Niagara ‍‍‍	0	–	0	–	0	–	5	–	10	–	0	.333
Marist ‍‍‍	0	–	0	–	0	–	3	–	9	–	0	.250
Canisius ‍‍‍	0	–	0	–	0	–	3	–	11	–	1	.233
Manhattan ‍‍‍	0	–	0	–	0	–	3	–	9	–	1	.269
Quinnipiac ‍‍‍	0	–	0	–	0	–	3	–	11	–	0	.214
Iona ‍‍‍	0	–	0	–	0	–	3	–	12	–	0	.200
Fairfield ‍‍‍	0	–	0	–	0	–	2	–	9	–	0	.182
Saint Peter's ‍‍‍	0	–	0	–	0	–	1	–	14	–	0	.067
Siena ‍‍‍	0	–	0	–	0	–	0	–	17	–	0	.000
‡ – Tournament champion As of March 12, 2020; Rankings from D1Baseball

2020 Mid-American Conference baseball standings
	Conf.				Overall
Team	W		L	PCT	W		L	PCT
Central Michigan ‍‍‍	0	–	0	–	11	–	6	.647
Western Michigan ‍‍‍	0	–	0	–	9	–	6	.600
Kent State ‍‍‍	0	–	0	–	7	–	6	.538
Miami (OH) ‍‍‍	0	–	0	–	8	–	7	.533
Ball State ‍‍‍	0	–	0	–	7	–	9	.438
Northern Illinois ‍‍‍	0	–	0	–	7	–	10	.412
Ohio ‍‍‍	0	–	0	–	3	–	7	.300
Toledo ‍‍‍	0	–	0	–	3	–	13	.188
Bowling Green ‍‍‍	0	–	0	–	2	–	11	.154
Eastern Michigan ‍‍‍	0	–	0	–	2	–	12	.143
Akron ‍‍‍	0	–	0	–	1	–	11	.083
‡ – Tournament champion As of March 12, 2020; Rankings from D1Baseball

2020 Mid-Eastern Athletic Conference baseball standings
	Conf.				Overall
Team	W		L	PCT	W		L	PCT
North Carolina A&T ‍‍‍	0	–	0	–	7	–	9	.438
North Carolina Central ‍‍‍	0	–	0	–	6	–	11	.353
Bethune-Cookman ‍‍‍	0	–	0	–	6	–	12	.333
Florida A&M ‍‍‍	0	–	0	–	5	–	10	.333
Maryland Eastern Shore ‍‍‍	0	–	0	–	4	–	11	.267
Coppin State ‍‍‍	0	–	0	–	3	–	10	.231
Delaware State ‍‍‍	0	–	0	–	3	–	12	.200
Norfolk State ‍‍‍	0	–	0	–	3	–	13	.188
‡ – Tournament champion Florida A&M is ineligible for postseason play and conference championships due to NCAA sanctions. As of March 12, 2020; Rankings from D1Baseball

2020 Missouri Valley Conference baseball standings
	Conf.				Overall
Team	W		L	PCT	W		L	PCT
No. 22 Dallas Baptist ‍‍‍	0	–	0	–	12	–	4	.750
Southern Illinois ‍‍‍	0	–	0	–	12	–	6	.667
Indiana State ‍‍‍	0	–	0	–	8	–	6	.571
Missouri State ‍‍‍	0	–	0	–	9	–	8	.529
Illinois State ‍‍‍	0	–	0	–	7	–	9	.438
Bradley ‍‍‍	0	–	0	–	4	–	6	.400
Evansville ‍‍‍	0	–	0	–	5	–	11	.313
Valparaiso ‍‍‍	0	–	0	–	2	–	14	.125
‡ – Tournament champion As of March 15, 2020; Rankings from D1Baseball

2020 Mountain West Conference baseball standings
	Conf.				Overall
Team	W		L	PCT	W		L	PCT
New Mexico ‍‍‍	0	–	0	–	14	–	4	.778
Boise State ‍‍‍	0	–	0	–	9	–	5	.643
San Diego State ‍‍‍	0	–	0	–	10	–	6	.625
Fresno State ‍‍‍	0	–	0	–	9	–	7	.563
Air Force ‍‍‍	0	–	0	–	7	–	12	.368
UNLV ‍‍‍	0	–	0	–	6	–	11	.353
San Jose State ‍‍‍	0	–	0	–	5	–	12	.294
Nevada ‍‍‍	0	–	0	–	2	–	12	.143
As of March 12, 2020; Rankings from D1Baseball

2020 Northeast Conference baseball standings
	Conf.				Overall
Team	W		L	PCT	W		L	PCT
LIU ‍‍‍	0	–	0	–	5	–	5	.500
Sacred Heart ‍‍‍	0	–	0	–	6	–	7	.462
Wagner ‍‍‍	0	–	0	–	6	–	8	.429
Merrimack ‍‍‍	0	–	0	–	6	–	9	.400
Central Connecticut ‍‍‍	0	–	0	–	4	–	8	.333
Fairleigh Dickinson ‍‍‍	0	–	0	–	4	–	9	.308
Bryant ‍‍‍	0	–	0	–	4	–	11	.267
Mount St. Mary's ‍‍‍	0	–	0	–	2	–	10	.167
‡ – Tournament champion As of March 12, 2020; Rankings from D1Baseball

2020 Ohio Valley Conference baseball standings
	Conf.				Overall
Team	W		L	PCT	W		L	PCT
Belmont ‍‍‍	3	–	0	1.000	14	–	3	.824
SIU Edwardsville ‍‍‍	3	–	0	1.000	8	–	7	.533
Murray State ‍‍‍	2	–	1	.667	10	–	7	.588
Southeast Missouri State ‍‍‍	2	–	1	.667	9	–	7	.563
Eastern Illinois ‍‍‍	2	–	1	.667	8	–	6	.571
Jacksonville State ‍‍‍	1	–	2	.333	7	–	8	.467
Austin Peay ‍‍‍	1	–	2	.333	7	–	10	.412
UT Martin ‍‍‍	1	–	2	.333	5	–	11	.313
Eastern Kentucky ‍‍‍	0	–	0	–	12	–	2	.857
Morehead State ‍‍‍	0	–	3	.000	5	–	10	.333
Tennessee Tech ‍‍‍	0	–	3	.000	3	–	12	.200
‡ – Tournament champion As of March 12, 2020; Rankings from D1Baseball

2020 Pac-12 Conference baseball standings
	Conf.				Overall
Team	W		L	PCT	W		L	PCT
No. 5 UCLA ‍‍‍	0	–	0	–	13	–	2	.867
No. 9 Arizona State ‍‍‍	0	–	0	–	13	–	4	.765
Arizona ‍‍‍	0	–	0	–	10	–	5	.667
USC ‍‍‍	0	–	0	–	10	–	5	.667
Washington ‍‍‍	0	–	0	–	9	–	6	.600
Washington State ‍‍‍	0	–	0	–	9	–	7	.563
Oregon ‍‍‍	0	–	0	–	8	–	7	.533
Utah ‍‍‍	0	–	0	–	6	–	7	.462
Oregon State ‍‍‍	0	–	0	–	5	–	9	.357
Stanford ‍‍‍	0	–	0	–	5	–	11	.313
California ‍‍‍	0	–	0	–	5	–	11	.313
† – Conference champion y – Invited to the NCAA tournament As of March 12, 2020; Rankings from D1Baseball

2020 Patriot League baseball standings
	Conf.				Overall
Team	W		L	PCT	W		L	PCT
Navy ‍‍‍	0	–	0	–	14	–	1	.933
Army ‍‍‍	0	–	0	–	6	–	9	.400
Holy Cross ‍‍‍	0	–	0	–	5	–	10	.333
Lehigh ‍‍‍	0	–	0	–	5	–	10	.333
Lafayette ‍‍‍	0	–	0	–	4	–	10	.286
Bucknell ‍‍‍	0	–	0	–	4	–	12	.250
‡ – Tournament champion As of March 12, 2020; Rankings from D1Baseball

2020 Southeastern Conference baseball standings
	Conf.				Overall
Team	W		L	PCT	W		L	PCT
Eastern
No. 1 Florida ‍‍‍	0	–	0	–	16	–	1	.941
Tennessee ‍‍‍	0	–	0	–	15	–	2	.882
No. 3 Georgia ‍‍‍	0	–	0	–	14	–	4	.778
South Carolina ‍‍‍	0	–	0	–	12	–	4	.750
No. 6 Vanderbilt ‍‍‍	0	–	0	–	13	–	5	.722
Missouri • ‍‍‍	0	–	0	–	11	–	5	.688
Kentucky ‍‍‍	0	–	0	–	11	–	6	.647
Western
No. 8 Ole Miss ‍‍‍	0	–	0	–	16	–	1	.941
Alabama ‍‍‍	0	–	0	–	16	–	1	.941
Texas A&M ‍‍‍	0	–	0	–	15	–	3	.833
No. 17 Mississippi State ‍‍‍	0	–	0	–	12	–	4	.750
No. 18 Auburn ‍‍‍	0	–	0	–	13	–	5	.722
No. 19 LSU ‍‍‍	0	–	0	–	12	–	5	.706
No. 14 Arkansas ‍‍‍	0	–	0	–	11	–	5	.688
‡ – Tournament champion – ineligible for postseason due to NCAA sanctions As of March 12, 2020; Rankings from D1Baseball

2020 Southern Conference baseball standings
	Conf.				Overall
Team	W		L	PCT	W		L	PCT
Samford ‍‍‍	0	–	0	–	13	–	2	.867
Wofford ‍‍‍	0	–	0	–	14	–	3	.824
Mercer ‍‍‍	0	–	0	–	13	–	3	.813
East Tennessee State ‍‍‍	0	–	0	–	12	–	3	.800
UNC Greensboro ‍‍‍	0	–	0	–	11	–	5	.688
The Citadel ‍‍‍	0	–	0	–	10	–	6	.625
Western Carolina ‍‍‍	0	–	0	–	8	–	8	.500
Furman ‍‍‍	0	–	0	–	8	–	9	.471
VMI ‍‍‍	0	–	0	–	4	–	13	.235
‡ – Tournament champion As of March 12, 2020; Rankings from D1Baseball

2020 Southland Conference baseball standings
	Conf.				Overall
Team	W		L	PCT	W		L	PCT
Stephen F. Austin ‍‍‍	3	–	0	1.000	6	–	10	.375
Northwestern State ‍‍‍	2	–	1	.667	12	–	4	.750
New Orleans ‍‍‍	2	–	1	.667	11	–	6	.647
Central Arkansas ‍‍‍	2	–	1	.667	8	–	8	.500
Texas A&M–Corpus Christi ‍‍‍	2	–	1	.667	8	–	10	.444
Houston Baptist ‍‍‍	2	–	1	.667	6	–	11	.353
Incarnate Word ‍‍‍	1	–	2	.333	9	–	7	.563
Nicholls ‍‍‍	1	–	2	.333	10	–	8	.556
Sam Houston State ‍‍‍	1	–	2	.333	7	–	7	.500
Abilene Christian ‍‍‍	1	–	2	.333	7	–	8	.467
Southeastern Louisiana ‍‍‍	1	–	2	.333	6	–	10	.375
McNeese State ‍‍‍	0	–	0	–	10	–	7	.588
Lamar ‍‍‍	0	–	3	.000	7	–	10	.412
‡ – Tournament champion Rankings from D1Baseball

2020 Southwestern Athletic Conference baseball standings
	Conf.				Overall
Team	W		L	PCT	W		L	PCT
East
Alabama State ‍‍‍	3	–	0	1.000	14	–	4	.778
Jackson State ‍‍‍	3	–	0	1.000	9	–	7	.563
Alcorn State ‍‍‍	3	–	3	.500	5	–	7	.417
Alabama A&M ‍‍‍	3	–	3	.500	3	–	14	.176
Mississippi Valley State ‍‍‍	0	–	6	.000	0	–	15	.000
West
Southern ‍‍‍	3	–	0	1.000	6	–	10	.375
Texas Southern ‍‍‍	4	–	2	.667	7	–	12	.368
Arkansas–Pine Bluff ‍‍‍	3	–	3	.500	6	–	12	.333
Grambling State ‍‍‍	1	–	2	.333	6	–	10	.375
Prairie View A&M ‍‍‍	1	–	5	.167	4	–	15	.211
‡ – Tournament champion As of March 12, 2020; Rankings from Collegiate Baseball

2020 Summit League baseball standings
	Conf.				Overall
Team	W		L	PCT	W		L	PCT
Omaha ‍‍‍	0	–	0	–	10	–	4	.714
North Dakota State ‍‍‍	0	–	0	–	8	–	9	.471
Oral Roberts ‍‍‍	0	–	0	–	6	–	10	.375
Purdue Fort Wayne ‍‍‍	0	–	0	–	5	–	10	.333
South Dakota State ‍‍‍	0	–	0	–	5	–	12	.294
Western Illinois ‍‍‍	0	–	0	–	0	–	13	.000
‡ – Tournament champion As of March 12, 2020; Rankings from D1Baseball

2020 Sun Belt Conference baseball standings
	Conf.				Overall
Team	W		L	PCT	W		L	PCT
East Division
Coastal Carolina ‍‍‍	0	–	0	–	11	–	5	.688
Georgia Southern ‍‍‍	0	–	0	–	11	–	5	.688
Appalachian State ‍‍‍	0	–	0	–	11	–	6	.647
Georgia State ‍‍‍	0	–	0	–	9	–	7	.563
Troy ‍‍‍	0	–	0	–	9	–	8	.529
South Alabama ‍‍‍	0	–	0	–	8	–	10	.444
West Division
Texas State ‍‍‍	0	–	0	–	14	–	4	.778
UT Arlington ‍‍‍	0	–	0	–	12	–	4	.750
Louisiana–Monroe ‍‍‍	0	–	0	–	12	–	5	.706
Little Rock ‍‍‍	0	–	0	–	9	–	8	.529
Louisiana ‍‍‍	0	–	0	–	8	–	9	.471
Arkansas State ‍‍‍	0	–	0	–	7	–	9	.438
x – Division champion ‡ – Tournament champion y – Invited to the NCAA tournament As of March 12, 2020; Rankings from D1Baseball

2020 West Coast Conference baseball standings
	Conf.				Overall
Team	W		L	PCT	W		L	PCT
San Francisco ‍‍‍	1	–	0	1.000	10	–	8	.556
San Diego ‍‍‍	2	–	1	.667	13	–	5	.722
Loyola Marymount ‍‍‍	2	–	1	.667	10	–	9	.526
Portland ‍‍‍	1	–	1	.500	13	–	5	.722
Pacific ‍‍‍	3	–	6	.333	12	–	14	.462
No. 21 Pepperdine ‍‍‍	0	–	0	–	12	–	3	.800
Santa Clara ‍‍‍	0	–	0	–	12	–	5	.706
Saint Mary's ‍‍‍	0	–	0	–	8	–	8	.500
BYU ‍‍‍	0	–	0	–	7	–	9	.438
Gonzaga ‍‍‍	0	–	0	–	6	–	10	.375
‡ – Tournament champion As of March 12, 2020; Rankings from D1Baseball

2020 Western Athletic Conference baseball standings
	Conf.				Overall
Team	W		L	PCT	W		L	PCT
New Mexico State ‍‍‍	0	–	0	–	12	–	4	.750
UTRGV ‍‍‍	0	–	0	–	11	–	7	.611
Sacramento State ‍‍‍	0	–	0	–	9	–	7	.563
Grand Canyon ‍‍‍	0	–	0	–	9	–	9	.500
California Baptist ‍‍‍	0	–	0	–	7	–	8	.467
Seattle ‍‍‍	0	–	0	–	7	–	9	.438
Cal State Bakersfield ‍‍‍	0	–	0	–	5	–	9	.357
Utah Valley ‍‍‍	0	–	0	–	5	–	14	.263
Northern Colorado ‍‍‍	0	–	0	–	4	–	13	.235
Chicago State ‍‍‍	0	–	0	–	2	–	16	.111
‡ – Tournament champion As of March 12, 2020; Rankings from D1Baseball

=== Aborted conference tournaments ===
The below conferences would have ended their regular seasons with a single-elimination tournament or a double-elimination tournament; all were cancelled when the NCAA ended the spring sports season on March 12.

Conference	Tournament Venue (City)
America East Conference	LeLacheur Park • Lowell, MA
American Athletic Conference	Spectrum Field • Clearwater, FL
Atlantic 10 Conference	The Diamond • Richmond, VA
Atlantic Coast Conference	BB&T Ballpark • Charlotte, NC
Atlantic Sun Conference	Swanson Stadium • Fort Myers, FL
Big 12 Conference	Chickasaw Bricktown Ballpark • Oklahoma City, OK
Big East Conference	Prasco Park • Mason, OH
Big South Conference	Segra Stadium • Fayetteville, NC
Big Ten Conference	TD Ameritrade Park • Omaha, NE
Big West Conference	No tournament; regular-season champion would have earned automatic bid
Colonial Athletic Association	Eagle Field at Veterans Memorial Park • Harrisonburg, VA
Conference USA	MGM Park • Biloxi, MS
Horizon League	Regular-season champion home stadium
Ivy League	Campus sites
Metro Atlantic Athletic Conference	Richmond County Bank Ballpark • Staten Island, NY
Mid-American Conference	Sprenger Stadium • Avon, OH
Mid-Eastern Athletic Conference	Jackie Robinson Ballpark • Daytona Beach, FL
Missouri Valley Conference	Duffy Bass Field • Normal, IL
Mountain West Conference	William Peccole Park • Reno, NV
Northeast Conference	Senator Thomas J. Dodd Memorial Stadium • Norwich, CT
Ohio Valley Conference	Rent One Park • Marion, IL
Pac-12 Conference	No tournament; regular-season champion would have earned automatic bid
Patriot League	Campus sites
Southeastern Conference	Hoover Metropolitan Stadium • Hoover, AL
Southern Conference	Fluor Field at the West End • Greenville, SC
Southland Conference	Whataburger Field • Corpus Christi, TX
Southwestern Athletic Conference	Wesley Barrow Stadium • New Orleans, LA
The Summit League	J. L. Johnson Stadium • Tulsa, OK
Sun Belt Conference	Springs Brooks Stadium • Conway, SC
West Coast Conference	Banner Island Ballpark • Stockton, CA
Western Athletic Conference	Hohokam Stadium • Meza, AZ

== College World Series ==
The 2020 College World Series was scheduled to start on June 12 in Omaha, Nebraska, but was cancelled due to the coronavirus pandemic and the NCAA prematurely ending spring sports for the 2019-2020 academic year.

== Coaching changes ==
This table lists programs that changed head coaches at any point from the first day of the 2020 season until the day before the first day of the 2021 season.

Team	Former coach	Interim coach	New coach	Reason
Boise State	Gary Van Tol	—N/a	—N/a	Program discontinued
