= 2020 UCLA Bruins baseball team =

American college baseball season

2020 UCLA Bruins baseball
- Conference: Pac-12 Conference

Ranking
- Coaches: No. 8
- CB: No. 1
- Record: 13–2 (0–0 Pac-12)
- Head coach: John Savage (15th season)
- Hitting coach: Bryant Ward (5th season)
- Pitching coach: Rex Peters (9th season)
- Home stadium: Jackie Robinson Stadium (Capacity: 1,820)

2020 Pac-12 Conference baseball standings
	Conf.				Overall
Team	W		L	PCT	W		L	PCT
No. 5 UCLA ‍‍‍	0	–	0	–	13	–	2	.867
No. 9 Arizona State ‍‍‍	0	–	0	–	13	–	4	.765
Arizona ‍‍‍	0	–	0	–	10	–	5	.667
USC ‍‍‍	0	–	0	–	10	–	5	.667
Washington ‍‍‍	0	–	0	–	9	–	6	.600
Washington State ‍‍‍	0	–	0	–	9	–	7	.563
Oregon ‍‍‍	0	–	0	–	8	–	7	.533
Utah ‍‍‍	0	–	0	–	6	–	7	.462
Oregon State ‍‍‍	0	–	0	–	5	–	9	.357
Stanford ‍‍‍	0	–	0	–	5	–	11	.313
California ‍‍‍	0	–	0	–	5	–	11	.313
† – Conference champion y – Invited to the NCAA tournament As of March 12, 2020; Rankings from D1Baseball

The 2020 UCLA Bruins baseball team represented the University of California, Los Angeles in the 2020 NCAA Division I baseball season as a member of the Pac-12 Conference. The team was coached by John Savage and played their home games at Jackie Robinson Stadium.

The Bruins began the 2020 season with high hopes after the successes of the prior season, earning the #12 ranking from Collegiate Baseball (CB) and #8 ranking in the ESPN/USA Today Coaches Poll in preseason polls. These rankings proved accurate, as UCLA began the season on a 12-game win streak and earned the #1 ranking from CB in their Week 2 and 3 rankings. Due to the COVID-19 pandemic, the season was cut short in early March. On March 12, the NCAA announced all spring and winter sports championships were cancelled, and UCLA made the decision to suspend academic and athletic activities through the month of March on the same day. Also on March 12, the Pac-12 Conference cancelled all athletics until further notice.

== Previous season ==
The Bruins finished 2019 with a 52–11 record, finishing first in the Pac-12 with a 24–5 record. After earning the top overall seed for the 2019 NCAA Division I baseball tournament, the Bruins advanced to the Los Angeles Super Regional, where they were defeated two games to one by eventual national runner-up Michigan.

== Personnel ==
=== Roster ===
2020 UCLA Bruins roster
Pitchers: 3 - Sean Mullen - Sophomore; 14 - Charles Harrison - Freshman; 19 - Jared Karros - Freshman; 24 - Zach Pettway - Junior; 27 - Jack Filby - Sophomore; 28 - Adrian Chaidez - Junior; 29 - Michael Townsend - Junior; 30 - Nick Nastrini - Sophomore; 33 - Jake Saum - Freshman; 34 - Felix Rubi - Senior; 35 - Kyle Mora - Senior; 40 - Holden Powell - Junior; 43 - Daniel Colwell - Sophomore; 44 - Nick Scheidler - (redshirt) Junior; 55 - Jesse Bergin - Sophomore	Catchers: 15 - Will McInerny - Senior; 18 - Darius Perry - Freshman; 25 - Noah Cardenas - Sophomore; 36 - Tommy Beres - Freshman; Infielders: 1 - Matt McLain - Sophomore; 4 - Kevin Kendall - Junior; 6 - Michael Curialle - Freshman; 7 - JT Schwartz - (redshirt) Freshman; 9 - RJ Teijeiro - Junior; 10 - Mikey Perez - Sophomore; 11 - Jake Moberg - Sophomore	Outfielders: 5 - Garrett Mitchell - Junior; 8 - Jarron Silva - (redshirt) Junior; 12 - Emanuel Dean - Freshman; 16 - Kyle Cuellar - Senior; 21 - Jordan Prendiz - (redshirt) Junior; 38 - Pat Caulfield - Junior; Utility: 32 - Josh Hahn (OF/P) - Freshman

=== Coaching staff ===
2020 UCLA Bruins coaching staff
Name	Position
John Savage	Head coach
Rex Peters	Assistant Coach
Bryant Ward	Assistant Coach/Recruiting Coordinator
Niko Gallego	Volunteer Assistant Coach
David Berg	Director of Baseball Operations
Carl Stocklin	Athletic Trainer
Reilly Beatty	Performance Nutrition Coordinator
Jake Bracewell	Athletic Performance

== Schedule and results ==
Legend
	UCLA win
	UCLA loss
	Postponement/cancellation
**Bold**	UCLA team member

2020 UCLA Bruins baseball game log
Regular season (13–2)

February
Date	Opponent	Rank (CB)	Site/stadium	Score	Win	Loss	Save	TV	Attendance	Overall record	Pac-12 Record
February 14	UC Riverside	No. 12	Jackie Robinson Stadium; Los Angeles, CA	**W** 4–2	Townsend (1–0)	Ohl (0–1)	**Powell (1)**		739	1–0	
February 15	UC Riverside	No. 12	Jackie Robinson Stadium	**W** 9–1	Nastrini (1–0)	Jacobs (0–1)			784	2–0	
February 16	UC Riverside	No. 12	Jackie Robinson Stadium	**W** 8–0	Bergin (1–0)	Granillo (0–1)			847	3–0	
February 18	Loyola Marymount	No. 10	Jackie Robinson Stadium	**W** 10–1	Karros (1–0)	Robins (0–1)			404	4–0	
February 21	Saint Mary's	No. 10	Jackie Robinson Stadium	**W** 5–0	Pettway (1–0)	Lomeli (0–2)			597	5–0	
February 22	Saint Mary's	No. 10	Jackie Robinson Stadium	**W** 7–1	Chaidez (1–0)	Madrigal (0–2)			675	6–0	
February 23	Saint Mary's	No. 10	Jackie Robinson Stadium	**W** 2–0	Bergin (2–0)	Ponce (0–1)	**Powell (2)**		905	7–0	
February 26	Pepperdine	No. 1	Jackie Robinson Stadium	**W** 8–2	Karros (2–0)	Groen (1–1)			533	8–0	
February 28	vs. No. 28 Oklahoma State	No. 1	Dr Pepper Ballpark; Frisco, TX; Frisco College Classic	**W** 8–1	Pettway (2–0)	Scott (2–1)			1,100	9–0	
February 29	vs. No. 15 Texas A&M	No. 1	Dr Pepper Ballpark; Frisco College Classic	**W** 10–2	Nastrini (2–0)	Roa (2–1)			1,021	10–0	

March
Date	Opponent	Rank (CB)	Site/stadium	Score	Win	Loss	Save	TV	Attendance	Overall record	Pac-12 Record
March 1	vs. Illinois	No. 1	Dr Pepper Ballpark; Frisco College Classic	**W** 14–1	**Bergin (3–0)**	Maldonado (0–2)				11–0	
March 3	at No. 30 UC Santa Barbara	No. 1	Caesar Uyesaka Stadium; Santa Barbara, CA	**L** 5–8	Roberts (3–1)	**Chaidez (1–1)**			450	11–1	
March 6	vs. No. 5 Vanderbilt	No. 1	Jackie Robinson Stadium; Southern California College Baseball Classic	**W** 3–2	**Pettway (3–0)**	Rocker (2–1)	**Powell (3)**		2,215	12–1	
March 7	vs. No. 18 TCU	No. 1	Jackie Robinson Stadium; Southern California College Baseball Classic	**L** 4–8	King (2–1)	**Nastrini (2–1)**	Krob (1)		952	12–2	
March 8	at USC	No. 1	Dedeaux Field; Los Angeles, CA; Southern California College Baseball Classic	**W** 15–3	**Bergin (4–0)**	Cornwell (2–1)		Pac-12 Networks	2,028	13–2	
March 13	Oregon	No. 3	Jackie Robinson Stadium	**Season Cancelled**							
March 14	Oregon	No. 3	Jackie Robinson Stadium								
March 15	Oregon	No. 3	Jackie Robinson Stadium								
March 20	Washington State	No. 2	Jackie Robinson Stadium								
March 21	Washington State	No. 2	Jackie Robinson Stadium								
March 22	Washington State	No. 2	Jackie Robinson Stadium								
March 24	UC Irvine		Jackie Robinson Stadium								
March 27	at Utah		Smith's Ballpark; Salt Lake City, UT								
March 28	at Utah		Smith's Ballpark								
March 29	at Utah		Smith's Ballpark								
March 31	Long Beach State		Jackie Robinson Stadium								

April
Date	Opponent	Rank (CB)	Site/stadium	Score	Win	Loss	Save	TV	Attendance	Overall record	Pac-12 Record
April 3	Cal State Fullerton		Jackie Robinson Stadium	**Season Cancelled**							
April 4	Cal State Fullerton		Jackie Robinson Stadium								
April 5	Cal State Fullerton		Jackie Robinson Stadium								
April 9	at Washington		Husky Ballpark; Seattle, WA								
April 10	at Washington		Husky Ballpark								
April 11	at Washington		Husky Ballpark								
April 14	UC Santa Barbara		Jackie Robinson Stadium								
April 17	Arizona State		Jackie Robinson Stadium								
April 18	Arizona State		Jackie Robinson Stadium								
April 19	Arizona State		Jackie Robinson Stadium								
April 21	at Long Beach State		Blair Field; Long Beach, CA								
April 24	at Oregon State		Goss Stadium at Coleman Field; Corvallis, OR								
April 25	at Oregon State		Goss Stadium at Coleman Field								
April 26	at Oregon State		Goss Stadium at Coleman Field								
April 28	at UC Irvine		Cicerone Field at Anteater Ballpark; Irvine, CA								

May
Date	Opponent	Rank (CB)	Site/stadium	Score	Win	Loss	Save	TV	Attendance	Overall record	Pac-12 Record
May 1	Stanford		Jackie Robinson Stadium	**Season Cancelled**							
May 2	Stanford		Jackie Robinson Stadium								
May 3	Stanford		Jackie Robinson Stadium								
May 5	at Cal State Fullerton		Goodwin Field; Fullerton, CA								
May 8	at Arizona		Hi Corbett Field; Tucson, AZ								
May 9	at Arizona		Hi Corbett Field								
May 10	at Arizona		Hi Corbett Field								
May 12	at Pepperdine		Eddy D. Field Stadium; Malibu, CA								
May 15	at California		Evans Diamond; Berkeley, CA								
May 16	at California		Evans Diamond								
May 17	at California		Evans Diamond								
May 19	at Loyola Marymount		George C. Page Stadium; Los Angeles								
May 21	USC		Jackie Robinson Stadium								
May 22	USC		Jackie Robinson Stadium								
May 23	USC		Jackie Robinson Stadium								

== Rankings ==
Ranking movements Legend: ██ Increase in ranking ██ Decrease in ranking
	Week																			
Poll	Pre	1	2	3	4	5	6	7	8	9	10	11	12	13	14	15	16	17	18	Final
Coaches'	8	8*		2	4	4														
Baseball America	10	10	11	5	4															
Collegiate Baseball^	12	10	1	1	3	2														
NCBWA†	11	11	7	5	4															
D1Baseball	14	14	10	6	5															

^ Collegiate Baseball ranked 40 teams in their preseason poll, but only ranked 30 teams weekly during the season.
† NCBWA ranks 30 teams in their preseason poll, but only ranks 25 teams weekly during the season.
* A new poll was not released for this week, so for comparison purposes, the previous week's ranking is inserted in this week's slot.

== 2020 MLB draft ==
Player	Position	Round	Overall	MLB team
Garrett Mitchell	OF	1	20	Milwaukee Brewers
Holden Powell	RHP	3	94	Washington Nationals
