= 2020 Oregon State Beavers baseball team =

American college baseball season

2020 Oregon State Beavers baseball
- Conference: Pac-12 Conference
- Record: 5–9–0 (0–0 Pac-12)
- Head coach: Mitch Canham (1st season)
- Assistant coaches: Pat Bailey (13th season); Ryan Gipson (2nd season); Rich Dorman (1st season)
- Home stadium: Goss Stadium at Coleman Field

2020 Pac-12 Conference baseball standings
	Conf.				Overall
Team	W		L	PCT	W		L	PCT
No. 5 UCLA ‍‍‍	0	–	0	–	13	–	2	.867
No. 9 Arizona State ‍‍‍	0	–	0	–	13	–	4	.765
Arizona ‍‍‍	0	–	0	–	10	–	5	.667
USC ‍‍‍	0	–	0	–	10	–	5	.667
Washington ‍‍‍	0	–	0	–	9	–	6	.600
Washington State ‍‍‍	0	–	0	–	9	–	7	.563
Oregon ‍‍‍	0	–	0	–	8	–	7	.533
Utah ‍‍‍	0	–	0	–	6	–	7	.462
Oregon State ‍‍‍	0	–	0	–	5	–	9	.357
Stanford ‍‍‍	0	–	0	–	5	–	11	.313
California ‍‍‍	0	–	0	–	5	–	11	.313
† – Conference champion y – Invited to the NCAA tournament As of March 12, 2020; Rankings from D1Baseball

The 2020 Oregon State Beavers baseball team represented Oregon State University in the 2020 NCAA Division I baseball season. The Beavers played their home games at Goss Stadium at Coleman Field and were members of the Pac-12 Conference. The team was coached by Mitch Canham in his 1st season at Oregon State after long-time head coach Pat Casey chose not to exercise an option to return following a year sabbatical. Canham is a former catcher for Oregon State and was a member of the 2006 and 2007 national championship teams. The season was indefinitely suspended after 14 games after the NCAA abruptly canceled all winter and spring season tournaments, including the College World Series, in response to the COVID-19 pandemic. On March 14, 2020, the season officially came to an end after the Pac-12 athletic conference canceled the remainder of all scheduled spring sports competitions through the end of the academic year.

== Season synopsis ==
The Beavers began Mitch Canham's first season with a daunting schedule, playing their first 11 games on the road, including a three-game series against No.9 Mississippi State in Mississippi. After just a 14-game season, the Beavers finished with their first losing record since 2003.

== Roster ==
2020 Oregon State Beavers baseball team
Players
Coaches

#	Pos.	Name	B/T	Height	Weight	Year	Home town
1	INF	Kyler McMahan	R/R	5 ft 10 in (1.78 m)	163 lb (74 kg)	Jr	Seattle, Washington
2	INF	Jake Harvey	R/R	5 ft 11 in (1.8 m)	163 lb (74 kg)	So	Kennewick, Washington
3	INF	Matthew Gretler	R/R	6 ft 0 in (1.83 m)	177 lb (80 kg)	So	Bonney Lake, Washington
4	INF	Justin Boyd	R/R	6 ft 0 in (1.83 m)	195 lb (88 kg)	Jr	Parker, Colorado
5	OF	Joe Casey	L/L	6 ft 0 in (1.83 m)	185 lb (84 kg)	RS Jr	Corvallis, Oregon
6	OF	J. D. McLaughlin	R/R	6 ft 4 in (1.93 m)	187 lb (85 kg)	Fr	Chandler, Arizona
7	INF	Jake Dukart	L/R	6 ft 2 in (1.88 m)	196 lb (89 kg)	So	Lake Oswego, Oregon
8	INF	Cesar Valero Sanchez	R/R	6 ft 1 in (1.85 m)	182 lb (83 kg)	Fr	Calgary, Alberta
9	INF	Andy Armstrong	R/R	5 ft 9 in (1.75 m)	185 lb (84 kg)	Sr	Salem, Oregon
12	OF	Micah McDowell	L/R	6 ft 2 in (1.88 m)	180 lb (82 kg)	Fr	Halifax, Nova Scotia
13	INF	George Mendazona	L/R	5 ft 11 in (1.8 m)	187 lb (85 kg)	RS Jr	Redmond, Oregon
14	C	Cole Hamilton	L/R	5 ft 8 in (1.73 m)	183 lb (83 kg)	RS So	Salem, Oregon
15	INF	Kyle Dernedde	R/R	5 ft 8 in (1.73 m)	169 lb (77 kg)	Fr	Tualatin, Oregon
16	RHP	Reid Sebby	R/R	6 ft 0 in (1.83 m)	184 lb (83 kg)	Jr	Huntington Beach, California
17	C	Troy Claunch	R/R	6 ft 0 in (1.83 m)	199 lb (90 kg)	Jr	Vacaville, California
18	INF	Ryan Ober	R/R	5 ft 11 in (1.8 m)	180 lb (82 kg)	Jr	Snohomish, Washington
19	RHP	A. J. Lattery	R/R	6 ft 5 in (1.96 m)	245 lb (111 kg)	Fr	Prior Lake, Minnesota
20	INF	Zach Clayton	R/R	6 ft 2 in (1.88 m)	219 lb (99 kg)	Jr	Oconomowoc, Wisconsin
21	RHP	Will Frisch	R/R	6 ft 0 in (1.83 m)	220 lb (100 kg)	Fr	Stillwater, Minnesota
22	RHP	Jake Pfennings	R/R	6 ft 8 in (2.03 m)	215 lb (98 kg)	So	Post Falls, Idaho
23	RHP	Kevin Abel	R/R	6 ft 2 in (1.88 m)	197 lb (89 kg)	Jr	San Diego, California
24	RHP	Nathan Burns	R/R	6 ft 2 in (1.88 m)	187 lb (85 kg)	Jr	West Bend, Wisconsin
25	RHP	Joey Mundt	R/R	6 ft 4 in (1.93 m)	221 lb (100 kg)	So	Hughson, California
26	LHP	Cooper Hjerpe	L/L	6 ft 2 in (1.88 m)	177 lb (80 kg)	Fr	Capay, California
28	INF	Wade Meckler	S/R	5 ft 9 in (1.75 m)	175 lb (79 kg)	So	Yorba Linda, California
29	RHP	Bret Soulages	R/R	6 ft 5 in (1.96 m)	194 lb (88 kg)	RS Fr	Alamo, California
30	C	Zack Zalesky	L/R	5 ft 10 in (1.78 m)	185 lb (84 kg)	RS Jr	Corvallis, Oregon
31	RHP	Jack Washburn	R/R	6 ft 2 in (1.88 m)	192 lb (87 kg)	Fr	Webster, Wisconsin
32	RHP	Mitchell Verburg	R/R	6 ft 3 in (1.91 m)	205 lb (93 kg)	RS Jr	Lake Oswego, Oregon
33	OF	Preston Jones	R/R	6 ft 0 in (1.83 m)	196 lb (89 kg)	Sr	Vancouver, Washington
34	LHP	Christian Chamberlain	L/L	5 ft 11 in (1.8 m)	170 lb (77 kg)	Jr	Reno, Nevada
35	C	Ben Steck	R/R	6 ft 2 in (1.88 m)	201 lb (91 kg)	Fr	Mill Creek, Washington
36	OF	Greg Fuchs	L/R	6 ft 1 in (1.85 m)	200 lb (91 kg)	RS So	Mercer Island, Washington
37	OF	Jacob Melton	L/L	6 ft 3 in (1.91 m)	186 lb (84 kg)	So	Medford, Oregon
38	LHP	Jake Mulholland	L/L	6 ft 2 in (1.88 m)	200 lb (91 kg)	Sr	Snohomish, Washington
40	LHP	Andrew Walling	L/L	6 ft 2 in (1.88 m)	218 lb (99 kg)	RS Jr	Longview, Washington
44	INF	Alex McGarry	L/L	6 ft 2 in (1.88 m)	206 lb (93 kg)	So	Vancouver, Washington
45	LHP	Kai Murphy	L/L	5 ft 8 in (1.73 m)	186 lb (84 kg)	Fr	Mesa, Arizona
47	INF	Richie Mascareñas	R/R	5 ft 9 in (1.75 m)	158 lb (72 kg)	Jr	Las Vegas, Nevada
48	OF	Wyatt Young	R/R	6 ft 0 in (1.83 m)	202 lb (92 kg)	Fr	Houston, Texas
49	OF	Max Samson	L/L	5 ft 11 in (1.8 m)	186 lb (84 kg)	Fr	Seattle, Washington
50	RHP	Ryan Brown	R/R	6 ft 0 in (1.83 m)	203 lb (92 kg)	Fr	Salem, Oregon
51	C	J. J. Hoover	R/R	6 ft 2 in (1.88 m)	207 lb (94 kg)	Fr	West Linn, Oregon

Head coach

Mitch Canham

Assistant coach(es)

Pat Bailey
Ryan Gipson

Pitching coach(es)

Rich Dorman

Legend

- (C) Team captain
- (S) Suspended
- (I) Ineligible
- Injured
- Current redshirt

Roster
Last update: September 22, 2019

== Schedule and results ==
Legend
	Oregon State win
	Oregon State loss
	Postponement/Tie
**Bold**	Oregon State team member

2020 Oregon State Beavers baseball game log
Regular season

February
Date	Opponent	Rank	Site/stadium	Score	Win	Loss	Save	Attendance	Overall record	PAC-12 Record
Feb 14	vs. New Mexico*	No. 25	Surprise Stadium • Surprise, AZ (Sanderson Ford College Baseball Classic)	**W** 11-4	**Chamberlain (1–0)**	Dye (0–1)	None	2,631	1–0	
Feb 15	vs. Gonzaga*	No. 25	Surprise Stadium • Surprise, AZ (Sanderson Ford College Baseball Classic)	**L** 4–10	Gomez (1–0)	**Mulholland (0–1)**	None	3,364	1–1	
Feb 16	vs. Gonzaga*	No. 25	Surprise Stadium • Surprise, AZ (Sanderson Ford College Baseball Classic)	**W** 5-1	**Pfennigs (1–0)**	Trogrlic-Iverson (0–1)	**Hjerpe (1)**	2,946	2–1	
Feb 17	vs. BYU*	No. 25	Surprise Stadium • Surprise, AZ (Sanderson Ford College Baseball Classic)	**L** 3-4	Zimmerman (1–0)	**Mundt (0–1)**	Johnson	2,598	2–2	
Feb 21	at No. 9 Mississippi State*		Dudy Noble Field • Starkville, MS	**L** 2-6	Dunlavey (1–0)	**Hjerpe (0–1)**	None	8,297	2–3	
Feb 22	at No. 9 Mississippi State*		Dudy Noble Field • Starkville, MS	**L** 4-7	McLeod (2–0)	**Pfennigs (1–1)**	None	12,034	2–4	
Feb 23	at No. 9 Mississippi State*		Dudy Noble Field • Starkville, MS	**W** 7-2	**Hjerpe (1–1)**	Shemper (0–1)	None	8,209	3–4	
Feb 27	at San Diego State*		Tony Gwynn Stadium • San Diego, CA	**W** 13–1	**Pfennigs (2–1)**	O'Sullivan (0–1)	None	712	4–4	
Feb 28	at San Diego State*		Tony Gwynn Stadium • San Diego, CA	**W** 4–1	**Chamberlain (2–0)**	Paredes (0–1)	**Hjerpe (2)**	1,415	5–4	
Feb 29	at San Diego State*		Tony Gwynn Stadium • San Diego, CA	**L** 0–6	Melton (3–0)	**Burns (0–1)**	None	1,738	5–5	

March
Date	Opponent	Rank	Site/stadium	Score	Win	Loss	Save	Attendance	Overall record	PAC-12 Record
Mar 1	at San Diego State*		Tony Gwynn Stadium • San Diego, CA	**L** 11–12	Flores (2–0)	**Mulholland (0–2)**	Schmitt (5)	910	5–6	
Mar 6	UCSB*		Goss Stadium at Coleman Field • Corvallis, OR	**L** 0-6	Boone (2–1)	**Chamberlain (2–1)**	None	3,427	5–7	
Mar 7	UCSB*		Goss Stadium at Coleman Field • Corvallis, OR	**L** 0–4	Torra (3–0)	**Pfennigs (2–2)**	Dand (2)	3,428	5–8	
Mar 8	UCSB*		Goss Stadium at Coleman Field • Corvallis, OR	**L** 2–3	Candau (1–0)	**Brown (0–1)**	Callahan (1)	3,382	5–9	
Mar 13	at Arizona		Hi Corbett Field • Tucson, AZ	**SEASON CANCELED**						
Mar 14	at Arizona		Hi Corbet Field • Tucson, AZ							
Mar 15	at Arizona		Hi Corbet Field • Tucson, AZ							
Mar 20	No. 10 Arizona State		Goss Stadium at Coleman Field • Corvallis, OR							
Mar 21	No. 10 Arizona State		Goss Stadium at Coleman Field • Corvallis, OR							
Mar 22	No. 10 Arizona State		Goss Stadium at Coleman Field • Corvallis, OR							
Mar 27	at California		Evans Diamond • Berkeley, CA							
Mar 28	at California		Evans Diamond • Berkeley, CA							
Mar 29	at California		Evans Diamond • Berkeley, CA							

April
Date	Opponent	Rank	Site/stadium	Score	Win	Loss	Save	Attendance	Overall record	PAC-12 Record
Apr 3	Oregon		Goss Stadium at Coleman Field • Corvallis, OR	**SEASON CANCELED**						
Apr 4	Oregon		Goss Stadium at Coleman Field • Corvallis, OR							
Apr 5	Oregon		Goss Stadium at Coleman Field • Corvallis, OR							
Apr 7	Seattle*		Goss Stadium at Coleman Field • Corvallis, OR							
Apr 9	Stanford		Goss Stadium at Coleman Field • Corvallis, OR							
Apr 10	Stanford		Goss Stadium at Coleman Field • Corvallis, OR							
Apr 11	Stanford		Goss Stadium at Coleman Field • Corvallis, OR							
Apr 13	Gonzaga*		Goss Stadium at Coleman Field • Corvallis, OR							
Apr 14	Gonzaga*		Goss Stadium at Coleman Field • Corvallis, OR							
Apr 17	at Utah		Smith's Ballpark • Salt Lake City, UT							
Apr 18	at Utah		Smith's Ballpark • Salt Lake City, UT							
Apr 19	at Utah		Smith's Ballpark • Salt Lake City, UT							
Apr 21	vs. Portland*		Ron Tonkin Field • Hillsboro, OR							
Apr 24	No. 4 UCLA		Goss Stadium at Coleman Field • Corvallis, OR							
Apr 25	No. 4 UCLA		Goss Stadium at Coleman Field • Corvallis, OR							
Apr 26	No. 4 UCLA		Goss Stadium at Coleman Field • Corvallis, OR							
Apr 27	CSU Bakersfield*		Goss Stadium at Coleman Field • Corvallis, OR							

May
Date	Opponent	Rank	Site/stadium	Score	Win	Loss	Save	Attendance	Overall record	PAC-12 Record
May 1	at Oklahoma State*		O'Brate Stadium • Stillwater, OK	**SEASON CANCELED**						
May 2	at Oklahoma State*		O'Brate Stadium • Stillwater, OK							
May 3	at Oklahoma State*		O'Brate Stadium • Stillwater, OK							
May 5	at Oregon*		PK Park • Eugene, OR							
May 8	at USC		Dedeaux Field • Los Angeles, CA							
May 9	at USC		Dedeaux Field • Los Angeles, CA							
May 10	at USC		Dedeaux Field • Los Angeles, CA							
May 12	Portland*		Goss Stadium at Coleman Field • Corvallis, OR							
May 15	Washington		Goss Stadium at Coleman Field • Corvallis, OR							
May 16	Washington		Goss Stadium at Coleman Field • Corvallis, OR							
May 17	Washington		Goss Stadium at Coleman Field • Corvallis, OR							
May 19	Oregon*		PK Park • Eugene, OR							
May 21	at Washington State		Bailey-Brayton Field • Pullman, WA							
May 22	at Washington State		Bailey-Brayton Field • Pullman, WA							
May 23	at Washington State		Bailey-Brayton Field • Pullman, WA							

== Rankings ==
Ranking movements Legend: ██ Increase in ranking ██ Decrease in ranking — = Not ranked
	Week																			
Poll	Pre	1	2	3	4	5	6	7	8	9	10	11	12	13	14	15	16	17	18	Final
Coaches'	25	25*	—	—	—	—														
Baseball America	—	—	—	—	—															
Collegiate Baseball^	32	—	—	—	—	—			S	E	A	S	O	N						
NCBWA†	29	—	—	—	—				C	A	N	C	E	L	E	D				
D1Baseball	—	—	—	—	—															

^ Collegiate Baseball ranked 40 teams in their preseason poll, but only ranked 30 teams weekly during the season.
† NCBWA ranks 30 teams in their preseason poll, but only ranks 25 teams weekly during the season.
* A new poll was not released for this week, so for comparison purposes, the previous week's ranking is inserted in this week's slot.

== 2020 MLB draft ==
Player	Position	Round	Overall	MLB team
Christian Chamberlain	LHP	4	105	Kansas City Royals
