= 2020 Arizona Wildcats baseball team =

2020 Arizona Wildcats baseball
- Conference: Pac-12 Conference
- Record: 10-5 (0-0 Pac-12)
- Head coach: Jay Johnson (5th season)
- Assistant coaches: Nate Yeskie (1st season); Dave Lawn (5th season); Marc Wanaka (5th season)
- Home stadium: Hi Corbett Field

The 2020 Arizona Wildcats baseball team represented the University of Arizona during the 2020 NCAA Division I baseball season. The Wildcats played their home games for the 9th season at Hi Corbett Field. The team was coached by Jay Johnson in his 5th season at Arizona. This also marked the program's first season with Nate Yeskie as associate head coach. Yeskie was hired away from Oregon State during the offseason to replace Sergio Brown who departed to assume the role of associate head coach at Cal State Fullerton. The season was cancelled on March 12, due to the COVID-19 pandemic.

== Personnel ==
=== Roster ===
2020 Pac-12 Conference baseball standings
	Conf.				Overall
Team	W		L	PCT	W		L	PCT
No. 5 UCLA ‍‍‍	0	–	0	–	13	–	2	.867
No. 9 Arizona State ‍‍‍	0	–	0	–	13	–	4	.765
Arizona ‍‍‍	0	–	0	–	10	–	5	.667
USC ‍‍‍	0	–	0	–	10	–	5	.667
Washington ‍‍‍	0	–	0	–	9	–	6	.600
Washington State ‍‍‍	0	–	0	–	9	–	7	.563
Oregon ‍‍‍	0	–	0	–	8	–	7	.533
Utah ‍‍‍	0	–	0	–	6	–	7	.462
Oregon State ‍‍‍	0	–	0	–	5	–	9	.357
Stanford ‍‍‍	0	–	0	–	5	–	11	.313
California ‍‍‍	0	–	0	–	5	–	11	.313
† – Conference champion y – Invited to the NCAA tournament As of March 12, 2020; Rankings from D1Baseball

2020 Arizona Wildcats roster
Pitchers • 4 - Gil Luna - Junior • 6 - Randy Abshier - Sophomore • 11 - Wesley Scott - Freshman • 12 - Garrett Irvin - Junior • 14 - Jonathan Guardado - Junior • 15 - Nate Brown - Senior • 19 - Zach Sherman - Junior • 20 - Bryce Collins - Freshman • 22 - Chandler Murphy - Freshman • 26 - Vince Vannelle - Senior • 27 - Dawson Netz - Freshman • 30 - Preston Price - Senior • 34 - Ian Churchill - Junior • 35 - Blake Peyton - Freshman • 36 - George Arias Jr. - Sophomore • 37 - German Fajardo - Freshman • 38 - Tyler Smith - Sophomore • 40 - Quinn Flanagan - Sophomore • 44 - Davis Vainer - Senior • 47 - Hunter Cope - Freshman	Catchers • 1 - Kobe Kato - Sophomore • 5 - Matthew Dyer - Junior • 16 - Austin Wells - Sophomore • 31 - Kaden Hopson - Freshman Infielders • 3 - Tony Bullard - Sophomore • 8 - Dayton Dooney - Sophomore • 10 - Jacob Blas - Sophomore • 18 - Blake Klassen - Freshman • 24 - Bryce Begell - Freshman • 29 - Kyson Donahue - Freshman	Outfielders • 7 - Mac Bingham - Freshman • 13 - Tyler Casagrande - Sophomore • 17 - Branden Boissiere - Sophomore • 23 - Donta Williams - Junior • 28 - Blake Paugh - Junior • 33 - Tate Soderstrom - Junior • 42 - Ryan Holgate - Sophomore Utility • 24 - Jacob Shaver - Freshman

=== Coaches ===
2020 Arizona Wildcats baseball coaching staff
- Jay Johnson - Head coach
- Nate Yeskie - Assistant coach
- Dave Lawn - Assistant coach
- Marc Wanaka - Volunteer Assistant Coach

=== Opening day ===
Opening Day Starters
Name	Position
Donta Williams	Center fielder
Austin Wells	Catcher
Matthew Dyer	Left fielder
Dayton Dooney	Designated hitter
Branden Boissiere	First baseman
Jacob Blas	Second baseman
Ryan Holgate	Right fielder
Kyson Donahue	Shortstop
Tony Bullard	Third baseman
Garrett Irvin	Starting pitcher

== Schedule and results ==
2020 Arizona Wildcats baseball game log
Regular season
Date	Opponent	Rank	Site/Stadium	Score	Win	Loss	Save	Overall Record	Pac-12 Record
Feb 14	vs Albany		Hi Corbett Field • Tucson, AZ	W 12-7	Irvin (1-0)	Weber (0-1)	None	1-0	
Feb 15	vs Albany		Hi Corbett Field • Tucson, AZ	W 15-0	Flanagan (1-0)	Scherrer (0-1)	None	2-0	
Feb 16	vs Albany		Hi Corbett Field • Tucson, AZ	W 11-3	Murphy (1-0)	Germinerio (0-1)	None	3-0	
Feb 17	vs Minnesota		Tempe Diablo Stadium • Tempe, AZ	L 2-5	Davis (1-0)	Netz (0-1)	Horton (1)	3-1	
Feb 21	vs Southern Illinois		Fowler Park • San Diego, CA	W 6-5	Irvin (2-0)	Back (1-1)	Luna (1)	4-1	
Feb 22	vs Iowa		Fowler Park • San Diego, CA	L 1-4	Judkins (2-0)	Flanagan (0-2)	Leonard (2)	4-2	
Feb 23	vs Nebraska		Tony Gwynn Stadium • San Diego, CA	W 3-2	Murphy (2-0)	Povich (0-2)	Vannelle (1)	5-2	
Feb 26	vs Central Michigan		Hi Corbett Field • Tucson, AZ	L 2-4	Frazer (1-1)	Luna (0-1)	None	5-3	
Feb 28	vs Central Michigan		Hi Corbett Field • Tucson, AZ	W 5-1	Irvin (3-0)	Miller (2-1)	Vannelle (2)	6-3	
Feb 29	vs Rhode Island		Hi Corbett Field • Tucson, AZ	W 19-10	Peyton (1-0)	Cherry (0-2)	None	7-3	
Mar 1	vs Rhode Island		Hi Corbett Field • Tucson, AZ	L 11-15	Brosius (1-0)	Brown (0-1)	None	7-4	
Mar 3	at Texas		UFCU Disch-Falk Field • Austin, TX	W 8-6	Vanelle (1-0)	Meaney (0-1)	None	8-4	
Mar 6	vs Houston		Hi Corbett Field • Tucson, AZ	W 7-1	Irvin (4-0)	Lockhart (1-2)	None	9-4	
Mar 7	vs Houston		Hi Corbett Field • Tucson, AZ	L 1-3	Aguilar (2-0)	Flanagan (1-2)	Cherry (2)	9-5	
Mar 8	vs Houston		Hi Corbett Field • Tucson, AZ	W 10-6	Price (1-0)	Henry (0-2)	None	10-5	
Mar 13	vs Oregon State	-	Hi Corbett Field • Tucson, AZ	Cancelled	-	-	-	-	-
Mar 14	vs Oregon State	-	Hi Corbett Field • Tucson, AZ	Cancelled	-	-	-	-	-
Mar 15	vs Oregon State	-	Hi Corbett Field • Tucson, AZ	Cancelled	-	-	-	-	-
Mar 17	at Arizona State	-	Phoenix Municipal Stadium • Phoenix, AZ	Cancelled	-	-	-	-	
Mar 20	at Washington	-	Husky Ballpark • Seattle, WA	Cancelled	-	-	-	-	-
Mar 21	at Washington	-	Husky Ballpark • Seattle, WA	Cancelled	-	-	-	-	-
Mar 22	at Washington	-	Husky Ballpark • Seattle, WA	Cancelled	-	-	-	-	-
Mar 24	vs New Mexico State	-	Hi Corbett Field • Tucson, AZ	Cancelled	-	-	-	-	
Mar 27	at Southern California	-	Dedeaux Field • Los Angeles, CA	Cancelled	-	-	-	-	-
Mar 28	at Southern California	-	Dedeaux Field • Los Angeles, CA	Cancelled	-	-	-	-	-
Mar 29	at Southern California	-	Dedeaux Field • Los Angeles, CA	Cancelled	-	-	-	-	-
Mar 31	at San Diego State	-	Tony Gwynn Stadium • San Diego, CA	Cancelled	-	-	-	-	
Apr 3	vs Stanford	-	Hi Corbett Field • Tucson, AZ	Cancelled	-	-	-	-	-
Apr 4	vs Stanford	-	Hi Corbett Field • Tucson, AZ	Cancelled	-	-	-	-	-
Apr 5	vs Stanford	-	Hi Corbett Field • Tucson, AZ	Cancelled	-	-	-	-	-
Apr 9	vs Washington State	-	Hi Corbett Field • Tucson, AZ	Cancelled	-	-	-	-	-
Apr 10	vs Washington State	-	Hi Corbett Field • Tucson, AZ	Cancelled	-	-	-	-	-
Apr 11	vs Washington State	-	Hi Corbett Field • Tucson, AZ	Cancelled	-	-	-	-	-
Apr 14	vs Grand Canyon	-	Hi Corbett Field • Tucson, AZ	Cancelled	-	-	-	-	
Apr 17	at Oregon	-	PK Park • Eugene, OR	Cancelled	-	-	-	-	-
Apr 18	at Oregon	-	PK Park • Eugene, OR	Cancelled	-	-	-	-	-
Apr 19	at Oregon	-	PK Park • Eugene, OR	Cancelled	-	-	-	-	-
Apr 21	vs New Mexico	-	Hi Corbett Field • Tucson, AZ	Cancelled	-	-	-	-	
Apr 24	vs Arizona State	-	Hi Corbett Field • Tucson, AZ	Cancelled	-	-	-	-	-
Apr 25	vs Arizona State	-	Hi Corbett Field • Tucson, AZ	Cancelled	-	-	-	-	-
Apr 26	vs Arizona State	-	Hi Corbett Field • Tucson, AZ	Cancelled	-	-	-	-	-
Apr 27	vs Utah Valley	-	Hi Corbett Field • Tucson, AZ	Cancelled	-	-	-	-	
May 1	at California	-	Evans Diamond • Berkeley, CA	Cancelled	-	-	-	-	-
May 2	at California	-	Evans Diamond • Berkeley, CA	Cancelled	-	-	-	-	-
May 3	at California	-	Evans Diamond • Berkeley, CA	Cancelled	-	-	-	-	-
May 4	at Sacramento State	-	John Smith Field • Sacramento, CA	Cancelled	-	-	-	-	
May 8	vs UCLA	-	Hi Corbett Field • Tucson, AZ	Cancelled	-	-	-	-	-
May 9	vs UCLA	-	Hi Corbett Field • Tucson, AZ	Cancelled	-	-	-	-	-
May 10	vs UCLA	-	Hi Corbett Field • Tucson, AZ	Cancelled	-	-	-	-	-
May 12	at Grand Canyon	-	GCU Ballpark • Phoenix, AZ	Cancelled	-	-	-	-	
May 14	vs Penn State	-	Hi Corbett Field • Tucson, AZ	Cancelled	-	-	-	-	
May 15	vs Penn State	-	Hi Corbett Field • Tucson, AZ	Cancelled	-	-	-	-	
May 16	vs Penn State	-	Hi Corbett Field • Tucson, AZ	Cancelled	-	-	-	-	
May 21	at Utah	-	Smith's Ballpark • Salt Lake City, UT	Cancelled	-	-	-	-	-
May 22	at Utah	-	Smith's Ballpark • Salt Lake City, UT	Cancelled	-	-	-	-	-
May 23	at Utah	-	Smith's Ballpark • Salt Lake City, UT	Cancelled	-	-	-	-	-

== 2020 MLB draft ==
Player	Position	Round	Overall	MLB team
Austin Wells	C	1	28	New York Yankees
Matthew Dyer	C	4	120	New York Mets
