= 2020 Stanford Cardinal baseball team =

American college baseball season

2020 Stanford Cardinal baseball
- Conference: Pac-12 Conference
- Record: 5–11 (0–0 Pac-12)
- Head coach: David Esquer (3rd season)
- Assistant coaches: Thomas Eager (3rd season); Tommy Nicholson (3rd season); Steve Rodriguez (1st season)
- Home stadium: Klein Field at Sunken Diamond

2020 Pac-12 Conference baseball standings
	Conf.				Overall
Team	W		L	PCT	W		L	PCT
No. 5 UCLA ‍‍‍	0	–	0	–	13	–	2	.867
No. 9 Arizona State ‍‍‍	0	–	0	–	13	–	4	.765
Arizona ‍‍‍	0	–	0	–	10	–	5	.667
USC ‍‍‍	0	–	0	–	10	–	5	.667
Washington ‍‍‍	0	–	0	–	9	–	6	.600
Washington State ‍‍‍	0	–	0	–	9	–	7	.563
Oregon ‍‍‍	0	–	0	–	8	–	7	.533
Utah ‍‍‍	0	–	0	–	6	–	7	.462
Oregon State ‍‍‍	0	–	0	–	5	–	9	.357
Stanford ‍‍‍	0	–	0	–	5	–	11	.313
California ‍‍‍	0	–	0	–	5	–	11	.313
† – Conference champion y – Invited to the NCAA tournament As of March 12, 2020; Rankings from D1Baseball

The 2020 Stanford Cardinal baseball team represented Stanford University in the 2020 NCAA Division I baseball season. The Cardinal played their home games at Klein Field at Sunken Diamond under third year coach David Esquer.

== Previous season ==
The Cardinal started February off hot by winning the 2019 Angels College Classic and continued through March winning the series against ranked Cal State Fullerton and ranked Texas five of the seven games. They continued winning when they got into the conference season but would stumble against #1 ranked UCLA losing two of three to them.

Stanford finished second in the Pac-12 conference and got their own Regional beating Sacramento State twice and then would take two of three against Fresno State. Next, the Cardinal went to the Starkville Super Regional and lose in double elimination to Mississippi State.

=== 2019 MLB draft ===
The Cardinal had nine players drafted in the 2019 MLB draft.

Player	Position	Round	Overall	MLB Team
Kyle Stowers	Outfield	2	71	Baltimore Orioles
Erik Miller	Pitcher	4	120	Philadelphia Phillies
Jack Little	Pitcher	5	161	Los Angeles Dodgers
Maverick Handley	Catcher	6	168	Baltimore Orioles
Will Matthiessen	Outfield	6	184	Pittsburgh Pirates
Andrew Daschbach	First Base	11	318	Baltimore Orioles
Brandon Wulff	Left Field	17	521	Los Angeles Dodgers
Duke Kinamon	Second Base	24	728	Tampa Bay Rays
Daniel Bakst	Shortstop	28	857	Boston Red Sox
**Kody Huff**	Catcher	32	968	Tampa Bay Rays
**Owen Cobb**	Shortstop	37	1103	San Diego Padres

Players in bold are signees drafted from high school that will attend Stanford.

== Personnel ==
=== Roster ===
2020 Stanford Cardinal roster
Pitchers: 18 - Cody Jensen - Sophomore; 20 - Brendan Beck - Junior; 26 - Quinn Mathews - Freshman; 27 - Carson Rudd - Junior; 28 - Alex Williams - Sophomore; 30 - Zach Grech - Senior; 34 - Luke Sleeper - (redshirt) Junior; 36 - Jonathan Worley - Senior; 37 - Jackson Parthasarathy - (redshirt) Senior; 38 - Nathan Fleischli - Freshman; 39 - Jacob Palisch - Junior; 40 - Nicolas Lopez - Sophomore; 41 - Matt Swartz - Freshman; 42 - Austin Weiermiller - Junior; 45 - Max Meier - Freshman	Catchers: 16 - Vincent Martinez - Sophomore; Infielders: 1 - Owen Cobb - Freshman; 4 - Carson Greene - Freshman; 5 - Austin Kretzschmar - Sophomore; 6 - Zach Sehgal - (redshirt) Sophomore; 10 - Adam Crampton - Freshman; 24 - Nick Brueser - Junior; 31 - Nick Bellafronto - (redshirt) Senior; 33 - Brett Barrera - Freshman	Outfielders: 11 - Brock Jones - Freshman; 15 - Grant Burton - Sophomore; 21 - Tim Tawa - Junior; 23 - Nickolas Oar - (redshirt) Senior; 44 - Christian Robinson - Junior; Utility: 2 - Christian Molfetta (OF/INF/C) - (redshirt) Senior; 7 - Brandon Dieter (INF/P) - Sophomore; 13 - Justin Moore (INF/P) - Sophomore; 19 - Henry Gargus (INF/OF) - Freshman; 25 - Kody Huff (C/INF) - Freshman; 29 - Cole Hinkleman (OF/INF) - Freshman

=== Coaching staff ===
2020 Stanford Cardinal coaching staff
Name	Position
David Esquer	Clarke and Elizabeth Nelson Director of Baseball
Thomas Eager	Assistant coach
Tommy Nicholson	Assistant coach
Steve Rodriguez	Assistant coach
Jeanette Morganti	Director of Baseball Operations
Sky Valenzuela	Video Coordinator

== Schedule and results ==
Legend
	Stanford win
	Stanford loss
	Postponement
**Bold**	Stanford team member

2020 Stanford Cardinal baseball game log
Regular season (5–11)

February (2–8)
Date	Opponent	Rank	Site/stadium	Score	Win	Loss	Save	TV	Attendance	Overall record	Pac-12 Record
Feb. 14	Cal State Fullerton	No. 17	Klein Field at Sunken Diamond • Stanford, CA	**L** 1-7	Bibee (1–0)	**Beck** (0–1)	Adolphus (1)	Stanford Live Stream	1,223	0–1	
Feb. 15	Cal State Fullerton	No. 17	Klein Field at Sunken Diamond • Stanford, CA	**L** 1-6	Luckham (1–0)	**Mathews** (0–1)		Stanford Live Stream	1,392	0–2	
Feb. 16	Cal State Fullerton	No. 17	Klein Field at Sunken Diamond • Stanford, CA	**W** 2-1	**Williams** (1–0)	Magrisi (0–1)	**Jensen** (1)	Stanford Live Stream	2,426	1–2	
Feb. 18	Santa Clara	No. 25	Stephen Schott Stadium • Santa Clara, CA	**L** 2-3	Howard (2–0)	**Meier** (0–1)	Heinrich (2)		430	1–3	
Feb. 21	Houston; Round Rock Classic	No. 25	Dell Diamond • Round Rock, TX	**L** 4-11	Lockhart Jr (1–0)	**Beck** (0–2)				1–4	
Feb. 22	#6 Texas Tech; Round Rock Classic	No. 25	Dell Diamond • Round Rock, TX	**L** 2-7	Bonnin (2–0)	**Mathews** (0–2)	Dallas (2)			1–5	
Feb. 23	Tennessee; Round Rock Classic	No. 25	Dell Diamond • Round Rock, TX	**L** 2-7	Gilbert (1–0)	**Williams** (1-1)	Walsh (1)			1–6	
Feb. 25	California		Evans Diamond • Berkeley, CA	**L** 4-8	King (2–0)	**Grech** (0–1)		Pac-12 Network	724	1–7	
Feb. 28	Grand Canyon		Klein Field at Sunken Diamond • Stanford, CA	**L** 3-5^{18}	Hull (2–0)	**Jensen** (0–1)		Stanford Live Stream	829	1–8	
Feb. 29	Grand Canyon		Klein Field at Sunken Diamond • Stanford, CA	**W** 3-2	**Meier** (1-1)	Ohl (0–2)	**Grech** (1)	Stanford Live Stream	1,000	2–8	

March (3–3)
Date	Opponent	Rank	Site/stadium	Score	Win	Loss	Save	TV	Attendance	Overall record	Pac-12 Record
Mar. 1	Grand Canyon		Klein Field at Sunken Diamond • Stanford, CA	**W** 8-2	**Williams** (2–1)	McCarville (1–2)	**Rudd** (1)	Stanford Live Stream	1,044	3–8	
Mar. 3	#16 Michigan		Klein Field at Sunken Diamond • Stanford, CA	**W** 5-4	**Parthasarathy** (1–0)	Smith (0–1)	**Grech** (2)	Stanford Live Stream	1,067	4–8	
Mar. 6	Kansas State		Klein Field at Sunken Diamond • Stanford, CA	**L** 1-6	Seymour (2-2)	**Beck** (0–3)	Lockwood (1)	Stanford Live Stream	808	4–9	
Mar. 7	Kansas State		Klein Field at Sunken Diamond • Stanford, CA	**W** 7-5	**Mathews** (1–2)	McCullough (2–1)	**Dieter (1)**	Stanford Live Stream	837	5–9	
Mar. 7	Kansas State		Klein Field at Sunken Diamond • Stanford, CA	**L** 1-11	Herbers (1–0)	**Meier** (1–2)		Stanford Live Stream	860	5–10	
Mar. 8	Kansas State		Klein Field at Sunken Diamond • Stanford, CA	**L** 1-6	Wicks (3–0)	**Dieter** (0–1)		Stanford Live Stream	815	5–11	
Mar. 21	California		Klein Field at Sunken Diamond • Stanford, CA					Pac-12 Network			-
Mar. 22	California		Klein Field at Sunken Diamond • Stanford, CA					Pac-12 Network			-
Mar. 23	California		Klein Field at Sunken Diamond • Stanford, CA					Pac-12 Network			-
Mar. 25	Cal Poly		Baggett Stadium • San Luis Obispo, CA								
Mar. 27	Arizona State		Klein Field at Sunken Diamond • Stanford, CA					Pac-12 Network			-
Mar. 28	Arizona State		Klein Field at Sunken Diamond • Stanford, CA					Pac-12 Network			-
Mar. 29	Arizona State		Klein Field at Sunken Diamond • Stanford, CA					Pac-12 Network			-
Mar. 31	Sacramento State		Klein Field at Sunken Diamond • Stanford, CA					Stanford Live Stream			-

April (0-0)
Date	Opponent	Rank	Site/stadium	Score	Win	Loss	Save	TV	Attendance	Overall record	Pac-12 Record
Apr. 3	Arizona		Hi Corbett Field • Tucson, AZ					Arizona Live Stream			-
Apr. 4	Arizona		Hi Corbett Field • Tucson, AZ					Arizona Live Stream			-
Apr. 5	Arizona		Hi Corbett Field • Tucson, AZ					Arizona Live Stream			-
Apr. 7	San Francisco		Klein Field at Sunken Diamond • Stanford, CA					Stanford Live Stream			
Apr. 9	Oregon State		Goss Stadium at Coleman Field • Corvallis, OR					Pac-12 Network			-
Apr. 10	Oregon State		Goss Stadium at Coleman Field • Corvallis, OR					Pac-12 Network			-
Apr. 11	Oregon State		Goss Stadium at Coleman Field • Corvallis, OR					Pac-12 Network			-
Apr. 14	Nevada		William Peccole Park • Reno, NV								
Apr. 17	USC		Klein Field at Sunken Diamond • Stanford, CA					Stanford Live Stream			-
Apr. 18	USC		Klein Field at Sunken Diamond • Stanford, CA					Stanford Live Stream			-
Apr. 19	USC		Klein Field at Sunken Diamond • Stanford, CA					Stanford Live Stream			-
Apr. 21	Fresno State		Pete Beiden Field • Fresno, CA								
Apr. 24	Oregon		Klein Field at Sunken Diamond • Stanford, CA					Stanford Live Stream			-
Apr. 25	Oregon		Klein Field at Sunken Diamond • Stanford, CA					Stanford Live Stream			-
Apr. 26	Oregon		Klein Field at Sunken Diamond • Stanford, CA					Stanford Live Stream			-

May (0-0)
Date	Opponent	Rank	Site/stadium	Score	Win	Loss	Save	TV	Attendance	Overall record	Pac-12 Record
May 1	UCLA		Jackie Robinson Stadium • Los Angeles, CA					Pac-12 Network			-
May 2	UCLA		Jackie Robinson Stadium • Los Angeles, CA					Pac-12 Network			-
May 3	UCLA		Jackie Robinson Stadium • Los Angeles, CA					Pac-12 Network			-
May 5	Santa Clara		Klein Field at Sunken Diamond • Stanford, CA					Stanford Live Stream			
May 8	Utah		Smith's Ballpark • Salt Lake City, UT					Utah Live Stream			-
May 9	Utah		Smith's Ballpark • Salt Lake City, UT					Utah Live Stream			-
May 10	Utah		Smith's Ballpark • Salt Lake City, UT					Utah Live Stream			-
May 12	San Francisco		Dante Benedetti Diamond at Max Ulrich Field • San Francisco, CA								
May 15	Washington State		Klein Field at Sunken Diamond • Stanford, CA					Pac-12 Network			-
May 16	Washington State		Klein Field at Sunken Diamond • Stanford, CA					Pac-12 Network			-
May 17	Washington State		Klein Field at Sunken Diamond • Stanford, CA					Pac-12 Network			-
May 18	Gonzaga		Klein Field at Sunken Diamond • Stanford, CA					Stanford Live Stream			
May 21	Washington		Husky Ballpark • Seattle, WA					Pac-12 Network			-
May 22	Washington		Husky Ballpark • Seattle, WA					Pac-12 Network			-
May 23	Washington		Husky Ballpark • Seattle, WA					Pac-12 Network			-

== Rankings ==
Ranking movements Legend: ██ Increase in ranking ██ Decrease in ranking — = Not ranked
	Week																			
Poll	Pre	1	2	3	4	5	6	7	8	9	10	11	12	13	14	15	16	17	18	Final
Coaches'	15	15*	15																	
Baseball America	—	—	—																	
Collegiate Baseball^	25	—	—																	
NCBWA†	16	26	—																	
D1Baseball	17	25	—																	

^ Collegiate Baseball ranked 40 teams in their preseason poll, but only ranked 30 teams weekly during the season.
† NCBWA ranks 30 teams in their preseason poll, but only ranks 25 teams weekly during the season.
* A new poll was not released for this week, so for comparison purposes, the previous week's ranking is inserted in this week's slot.
