= Alika Williams =

American baseball player (born 1999)

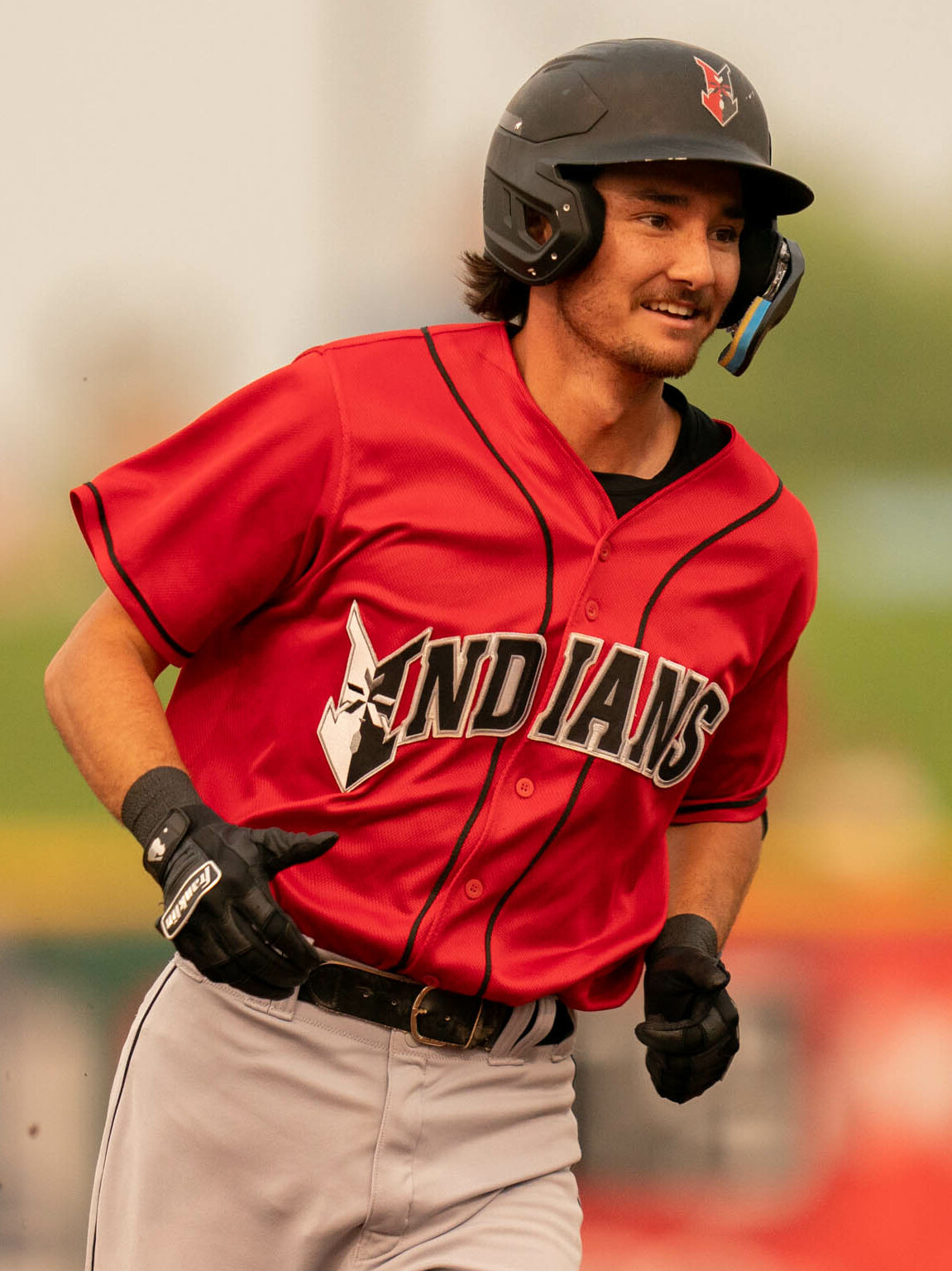
- Williams with the Indianapolis Indians in 2023

Athletics – No. 12
- Shortstop / Second baseman
- Born: March 12, 1999 (age 27); San Diego, California, U.S.
- Bats: Right Throws: Right

MLB debut
- July 25, 2023, for the Pittsburgh Pirates

MLB statistics (through 2026 season)
- Batting average: .238
- Home runs: 4
- Runs batted in: 27
- Stats at Baseball Reference

Teams
- Pittsburgh Pirates (2023–2024); Athletics (2026–present)

Alexander David "Alika" Williams (born March 12, 1999) is an American professional baseball shortstop for the Athletics of Major League Baseball (MLB). He has previously played in MLB for the Pittsburgh Pirates.

== Amateur career ==
Williams attended Rancho Bernardo High School in San Diego, California, where he played baseball. As a sophomore, he batted .402 with 22 runs batted in (RBIs). For his high school career, he had a .374 batting average. He was selected by the New York Yankees in the 32nd round of the 2017 Major League Baseball draft but did not sign and instead enrolled at Arizona State University to play college baseball.

In 2018, as a freshman for the Arizona State Sun Devils, Williams appeared in 55 games (making 54 starts), batting .280 with 20 RBIs. As a sophomore in 2019, he hit .333 with four home runs, 53 RBIs, and nine stolen bases over 57 games. In 2018 and 2019, he played collegiate summer baseball in the Cape Cod Baseball League for the Bourne Braves. During the summer of 2019, he also played for the United States collegiate national baseball team. During his junior year in 2020, Williams batted .250 with one home run and eight RBIs over 17 games before the college baseball season was cut short due to the COVID-19 pandemic.

== Professional career ==
=== Tampa Bay Rays ===
The Tampa Bay Rays selected Williams with the 37th overall pick in the 2020 Major League Baseball draft. He signed with the Rays on June 18 for $1.85 million. He did not play a minor league game in 2020 due to the cancellation of the minor league season caused by the pandemic.

Williams made his professional debut in 2021 with the Charleston RiverDogs of the Low-A East. He was promoted to the Bowling Green Hot Rods of the High-A East in mid-August. After 13 games with Bowling Green, he was promoted to the Durham Bulls of the Triple-A East, but was reassigned back to Bowling Green shortly after. Over 73 games between the three affiliates, Williams slashed .267/.312/.375 with five home runs and 46 RBI. He returned to Bowling Green to open the 2022 season.

=== Pittsburgh Pirates ===
On June 2, 2023, the Rays traded Williams to the Pittsburgh Pirates in exchange for Robert Stephenson. In 36 games for the Triple–A Indianapolis Indians, he batted .305/.384/.531 with seven home runs and 20 RBI. On July 25, Williams was selected to the 40-man roster and promoted to the major leagues for the first time. He notched his first career hit and RBI with a fifth inning single in a 7–6 victory over the Philadelphia Phillies on July 29. Williams hit .198/.270/.248 with six RBI across 46 games with the Pirates in 2023, while being lauded for his defense at shortstop.

Williams was named to the Pirates' 2024 Opening Day roster as a backup middle infielder. In 37 games for Pittsburgh, he batted .207/.242/.299 with no home runs, five RBI, and one stolen base.

Williams was designated for assignment by the Pirates on February 3, 2025. He cleared waivers and was sent outright to Triple-A Indianapolis on February 8. In 103 appearances for Indianapolis, Williams slashed .268/.329/.393 with nine home runs, 42 RBI, and five stolen bases. Williams was released by the Pirates organization on January 16, 2026.

On February 3, 2026, Williams re-signed with the Pirates organization on a minor league contract. He made 34 appearances for Triple-A Indianapolis, batting .317/.385/.467 with two home runs and 18 RBI.

=== Athletics ===
On May 16, 2026, Williams was traded to the Athletics in exchange for Kyle Robinson; he was subsequently selected to the team's active roster. He hit his first career home run on June 10 off Milwaukee Brewers starter Brandon Sproat. He was optioned to the Triple-A Las Vegas Aviators on June 21, but was recalled by the Athletics four days later. Williams played in 88 games for the Athletics and hit .270 with four home runs, 16 RBI, and 20 doubles.

== Personal life ==
Williams is of Korean descent through his mother.
