= Bailey–Brayton Field =

Baseball stadium in Pullman, Washington

Bailey-Brayton Field
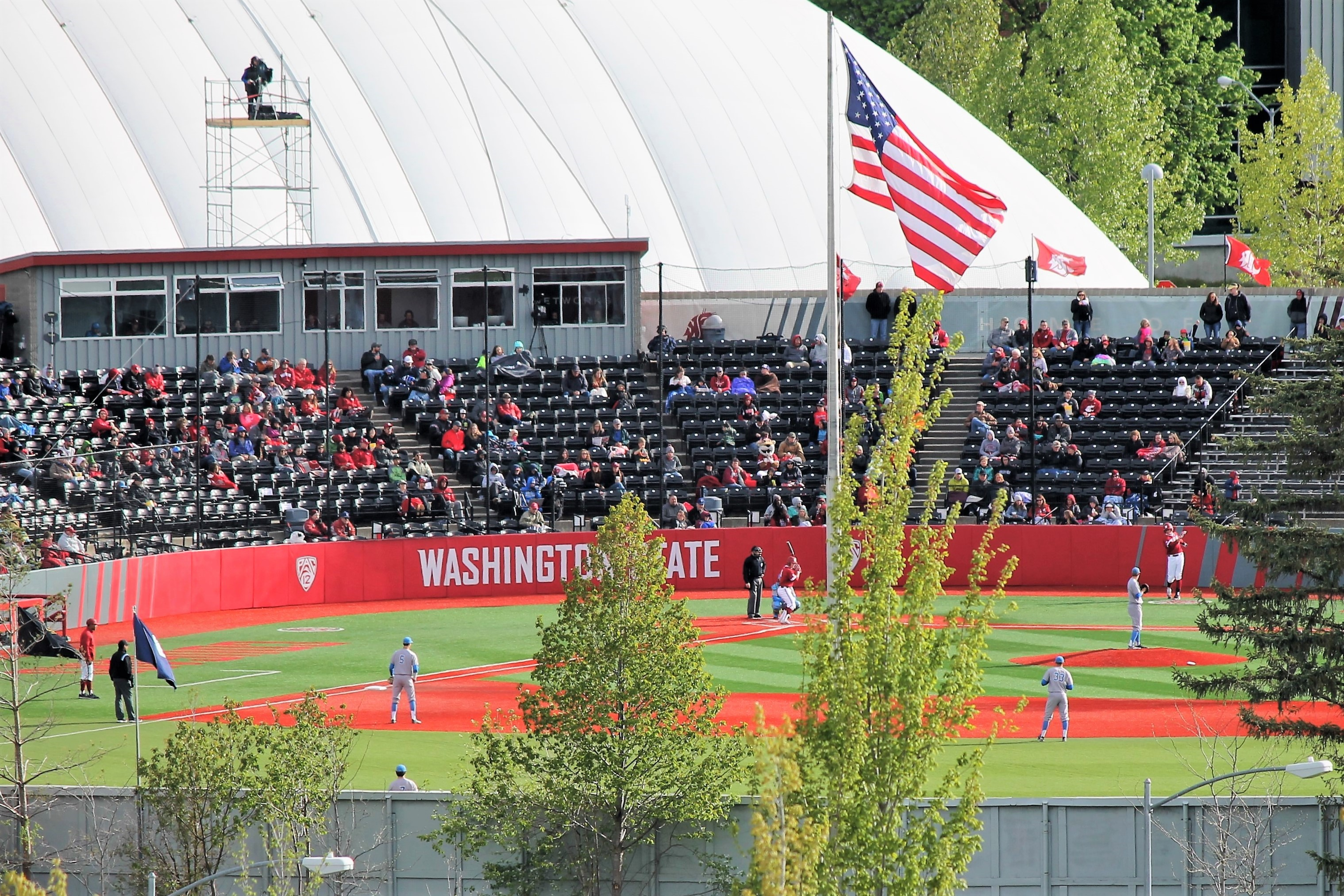

- Location in the United States Location in Washington
- Interactive map of Bailey-Brayton Field
- Former names: Buck Bailey Field (1980–1999)
- Location: Washington State University; Pullman, Washington, U.S.
- Coordinates: 46.735°N 117.155°W
- Owner: Washington State University
- Operator: Washington State University
- Capacity: 3,500
- Surface: AstroTurf - (2017–present); FieldTurf - (2004–2017); Natural grass - (1980–2003)
- Field size: Left Field: 330 ft (101 m); L. Center: 375 ft (114 m); Center: 400 ft (122 m); R. Center: 385 ft (117 m); Right Field: 335 ft (102 m)

Construction
- Groundbreaking: 1979
- Opened: April 12, 1980; 46 years ago

Tenants
- Washington State Cougars (NCAA); 1980–present

Bailey–Brayton Field is a college baseball stadium in the northwest United States, on the campus of Washington State University in Pullman, Washington. It is the home field of the Washington State Cougars of the Pac-12 Conference, and is located on the east side of the WSU campus, just southeast of Beasley Coliseum. The approximate elevation of the north-aligned diamond is 2,550 feet (775 m) above sea level and its seating capacity is 3,500.

It opened for baseball 46 years ago in 1980 on April 12 as new Buck Bailey Field, in honor of WSU's head coach for 32 seasons (1927–1961, except during World War II); the name was carried over from the previous venue, named for him in 1950. Born and raised in central Texas, Bailey retired after the 1961 season at age 65. Three years later, he and his wife Frances were killed in an automobile collision in New Mexico in October 1964.

Lights were added in 1984, as it became the first NCAA ballpark in the Northwest to install them. The field was renamed in January 2000 to also honor longtime Cougar baseball head coach Chuck "Bobo" Brayton, who led the Cougars from 1962 to 1994, and continuously improved the venue.

In the fall of 2003, the natural grass surface was removed and replaced with FieldTurf, and WSU became the first Division I program to install FieldTurf in its home ballpark. The only portion of the field that remained dirt was the pitcher's mound and home plate area. The basepaths and the "skin" portion of the infield are FieldTurf, colored reddish brown, while the outfield is green FieldTurf. The home plate area was converted to FieldTurf in 2007, leaving only the pitcher's mound with dirt. In fall 2013, the dirt pitcher's mound was replaced with a FieldTurf mound and the infield FieldTurf was replaced.

The previous WSU baseball field, also named for Bailey, was located at the site of the Mooberry Track, the current venue for track & field. Home plate was in the northwest corner at approximately (46.734°N 117.16065°W), and the field was oriented southeast. When Martin Stadium was renovated following the 1978 football season, its running track was removed to add seating nearer the lowered playing field. The new track was originally planned for the site of the present-day baseball stadium, but inadequate settling of the excavated dirt from Martin Stadium caused a change in plans. The new track was built over the more stable ground of the old Bailey baseball field, north of Martin Stadium, and baseball was relocated to the former proposed track site.

When Sick's Stadium in Seattle was demolished in 1979, its bleachers, fencing, and foul poles were moved to Pullman to construct the new Buck Bailey Field. The bleachers didn't fit and were later sold. Most of the other items from Sick's were bought for $60,000 in 1978 by Harry Ornest, the owner of the new Vancouver Canadians for use at Nat Bailey Stadium in Vancouver, British Columbia.

== See also ==
- List of NCAA Division I baseball venues
