= List of USC Trojans baseball seasons =

This is a list of USC Trojans baseball seasons. The USC Trojans baseball program is a college baseball team that represents the University of Southern California in the Big Ten Conference in the National Collegiate Athletic Association. The Trojans have played their home games at Dedeaux Field in Los Angeles, California since 1974.

The Trojans have won 12 College World Series titles, more than any other program, and have reached the ultimate event 21 times. They have appeared in the NCAA Division I baseball tournament 37 times.

== Season results ==
National champions	College World Series berth	NCAA tournament berth	Conference Tournament champions	Conference/Division Regular season Champions

Season	Head coach	Conference (Note: The Trojans joined the California Intercollegiate Baseball Association in 1927, having played their earlier seasons as an independent. This conference was essentially a division within the Pacific Coast Conference and its 1960 baseball season successor, the Athletic Association of Western Universities. This conference, through expansion, became the Pacific-8, Pacific-10, and finally the Pac-12 Conference.)	Season results									Tournament results		Final poll (Note: Collegiate Baseball began team rankings in 1959. Baseball America began during the 1981 season. The Coaches' Poll (published by USA Today's Sports Weekly and ESPN) began publishing its rankings during the 1992 season.)		
Season	Head coach	Conference	Overall				Conference					Conference (Note: Includes conference playoffs, which occurred between divisional champions from 1947–1959, and in multiple formats from 1970–1978 and 1995–1998. CIBA also held a championship series between its division winners in 1943. One-game playoffs for the right to advance to these events are also included in the totals.)	Postseason (Note: Postseason play involving the NCAA Division I Baseball Championship began in 1947.)	BA	CB	Coaches
Season	Head coach	Conference	Wins	Losses	Ties	%	Wins	Losses	Ties	%	Finish	Conference	Postseason	BA	CB	Coaches
USC Trojans
1889	No record	Independent	0	1	0	.000	N/A									
1890	No team															
1891	No team															
1892	No record	Independent	5	0	1	.917	N/A									
1893	No record	Independent	4	6	0	.400	N/A									
1894	No record	Independent	0	1	0	.000	N/A									
1895	No team															
1896	No record	Independent	0	2	0	.000	N/A									
1897	No team															
1898	No record	Independent	8	3	0	.727	N/A									
1899	No record	Independent	3	4	0	.429	N/A									
1900	No record	Independent	0	1	0	.000	N/A									
1901	No team															
1902	No record	Independent	0	6	0	.000	N/A									
1903	No record	Independent	3	3	0	.500	N/A									
1904	No record	Independent	1	4	0	.200	N/A									
1905	No record	Independent	6	5	0	.545	N/A									
1906	No record	Independent	12	4	1	.735	N/A									
1907	No record	Independent	7	6	0	.538	N/A									
1908	Harvey Holmes	Independent	17	2	0	.895	N/A									
1909	No record	Independent	11	7	0	.611	N/A									
1910	No record	Independent	4	6	0	.400	N/A									
1911	Curtiss Bernard	Independent	10	3	0	.769	N/A									
1912	Len Burrell	Independent	6	9	0	.400	N/A									
1913	No record	Independent	2	6	0	.250	N/A									
1914	George Wheeler	Independent	8	2	0	.800	N/A									
1915	Ralph Glaze	Independent	5	10	0	.333	N/A									
1916	Charles Millikan	Independent	6	5	1	.542	N/A									
1917	Charles Millikan & Phil Koerner	Independent	5	6	0	.455	N/A									
1918	No record	Independent	0	1	0	.000	N/A									
1919	No team															
1920	Gus Henderson	Independent	9	4	1	.679	N/A									
1921	Gus Henderson & Willis O. Hunter	Independent	9	3	0	.750	N/A									
1922	No record	Independent	5	6	0	.455	N/A									
1923	George Wheeler	Independent	7	11	0	.389	N/A									
1924	Sam Crawford	Independent	4	7	0	.364	N/A									
1925	Sam Crawford	Independent	9	4	1	.679	N/A									
1926	Sam Crawford	Independent	11	6	2	.632	N/A									
1927	Sam Crawford	CIBA	8	15	0	.348	6	6	0	.500	2nd	N/A				
1928	Sam Crawford	CIBA	12	7	0	.632	5	7	0	.417	T-3rd	N/A				
1929	Sam Crawford	CIBA	15	7	0	.682	8	5	0	.615	3rd	N/A				
1930	Sam Barry	CIBA	25	5	1	.823	11	2	0	.846	1st	N/A				
1931	Sam Barry	CIBA	24	6	0	.800	14	4	0	.778	2nd	N/A				
1932	Sam Barry	CIBA	14	5	0	.737	13	5	0	.722	1st	N/A				
1933	Sam Barry	CIBA	5	6	0	.455	3	6	0	.333	3rd	N/A				
1934	Sam Barry	CIBA	16	6	0	.727	10	5	0	.667	2nd	N/A				
1935	Sam Barry	CIBA	12	5	0	.706	10	5	0	.667	T-1st	N/A				
1936	Sam Barry	CIBA	15	4	0	.789	13	2	0	.867	1st	N/A				
1937	Sam Barry	CIBA	11	5	0	.688	10	5	0	.667	2nd	N/A				
1938	Sam Barry	CIBA	13	4	0	.765	11	4	0	.733	2nd	N/A				
1939	Sam Barry	CIBA	13	4	0	.765	11	4	0	.733	T-1st	N/A				
1940	Sam Barry	CIBA	11	7	0	.611	8	7	0	.533	3rd	N/A				
1941	Sam Barry	CIBA	9	6	0	.600	9	6	0	.600	3rd	N/A				
1942	Sam Barry & Rod Dedeaux	CIBA	14	2	0	.875	12	2	0	.857	1st	N/A				
1943	Rod Dedeaux	CIBA	14	2	0	.875	10	0	0	1.000	1st	1–2	N/A			
1944	Rod Dedeaux	CIBA	12	4	0	.750	4	4	0	.500	2nd	N/A				
1945	Rod Dedeaux	CIBA	8	7	0	.533	3	5	0	.375	2nd	N/A				
1946	Sam Barry & Rod Dedeaux	CIBA	15	2	0	.882	11	1	0	.917	1st	N/A				
1947	Sam Barry & Rod Dedeaux	CIBA	16	6	0	.727	11	4	0	.733	T-1st	0–1	—	N/A		
1948	Sam Barry & Rod Dedeaux	CIBA	26	4	0	.867	13	2	0	.867	1st	2–0	National champions	N/A		
1949	Sam Barry & Rod Dedeaux	CIBA	23	6	0	.793	12	2	0	.857	1st	2–1	College World Series	N/A		
1950	Sam Barry & Rod Dedeaux	CIBA	16	8	0	.667	8	7	0	.533	T-3rd	—	—	N/A		
1951	Rod Dedeaux	CIBA	22	10	0	.688	11	5	0	.688	1st	2–1	College World Series	N/A		
1952	Rod Dedeaux	CIBA	18	9	0	.667	11	5	0	.688	1st	0–2	—	N/A		
1953	Rod Dedeaux	CIBA	21	9	0	.700	10	6	0	.625	T-1st	—	District 8 playoffs	N/A		
1954	Rod Dedeaux	CIBA	14	7	0	.667	11	5	0	.688	1st	—	District 8 playoffs	N/A		
1955	Rod Dedeaux	CIBA	23	5	0	.821	12	3	0	.800	1st	2–0	College World Series	N/A		
1956	Rod Dedeaux	CIBA	21	5	0	.808	14	2	0	.875	1st	0–2	—	N/A		
1957	Rod Dedeaux	CIBA	18	4	0	.818	12	4	0	.750	T-1st	—	—	N/A		
1958	Rod Dedeaux	CIBA	28	3	0	.903	14	2	0	.875	1st	2–0	National champions	N/A		
1959	Rod Dedeaux	CIBA	23	4	1	.839	14	2	0	.875	1st	2–0	—	—	9	—
1960	Rod Dedeaux	CIBA	32	11	0	.744	12	4	0	.750	T-1st	N/A	College World Series Runners-up	—	2	—
1961	Rod Dedeaux	CIBA	36	7	0	.837	12	4	0	.750	1st	N/A	National champions	—	1	—
1962	Rod Dedeaux	CIBA	29	10	0	.744	11	5	0	.688	2nd	N/A	—	—	—	—
1963	Rod Dedeaux	CIBA	35	10	0	.778	10	6	0	.625	1st	N/A	National champions	—	1	—
1964	Rod Dedeaux	CIBA	34	11	0	.756	17	3	0	.850	1st	N/A	College World Series	—	4	—
1965	Rod Dedeaux	CIBA	23	14	0	.622	9	11	0	.450	4th	N/A	—	—	24	—
1966	Rod Dedeaux	CIBA	42	9	0	.824	16	4	0	.800	1st	N/A	College World Series	—	3	—
1967	Rod Dedeaux	Pac-8	30	11	2	.721	9	6	0	.600	T-3rd	N/A	—	—	14	—
1968	Rod Dedeaux	Pac-8	42	12	1	.773	16	2	1	.868	1st	N/A	National champions	—	1	—
1969	Rod Dedeaux	Pac-8	39	12	1	.760	13	8	0	.619	3rd	N/A	—	—	17	—
1970	Rod Dedeaux	Pac-8	45	13	0	.776	11	3	0	.786	1st	3–0	National champions	—	1	—
1971	Rod Dedeaux	Pac-8	46	11	0	.807	17	0	0	1.000	1st	3–1	National champions	—	1	—
1972	Rod Dedeaux	Pac-8	47	13	0	.783	14	4	0	.778	1st	2–0	National champions	—	1	—
1973	Rod Dedeaux	Pac-8	51	11	0	.823	14	4	0	.778	1st	2–0	National champions	—	1	—
1974	Rod Dedeaux	Pac-8	50	20	0	.714	11	7	0	.611	1st	2–0	National champions	—	1	—
1975	Rod Dedeaux	Pac-8	42	14	1	.746	12	4	0	.750	1st	2–0	NCAA West Regional	—	11	—
1976	Rod Dedeaux	Pac-8	33	26	2	.557	15	8	1	.646	2nd	—	—	—	—	—
1977	Rod Dedeaux	Pac-8	46	20	0	.697	16	2	0	.889	1st	2–0	NCAA West Regional	—	10	—
1978	Rod Dedeaux	Pac-8	54	9	0	.857	15	3	0	.833	1st	2–0	National champions	—	1	—
1979	Rod Dedeaux	Pac-10	33	24	0	.579	15	15	0	.500	4th	N/A	—	—	—	—
1980	Rod Dedeaux	Pac-10	27	24	0	.529	13	17	0	.433	T-5th	N/A	—	—	—	—
1981	Rod Dedeaux	Pac-10	34	24	0	.586	15	15	0	.500	3rd	N/A	—	—	—	—
1982	Rod Dedeaux	Pac-10	23	36	0	.390	9	21	0	.300	6th	N/A	—	—	—	—
1983	Rod Dedeaux	Pac-10	32	23	1	.580	17	13	0	.567	T-2nd	N/A	—	—	—	—
1984	Rod Dedeaux	Pac-10	44	23	0	.657	18	12	0	.600	T-2nd	N/A	NCAA West I Regional	9	24	—
1985	Rod Dedeaux	Pac-10	22	44	0	.333	5	25	0	.167	6th	N/A	—	—	—	—
1986	Rod Dedeaux	Pac-10	26	29	0	.473	12	18	0	.400	4th	N/A	—	—	—	—
1987	Mike Gillespie	Pac-10	32	28	0	.533	12	18	0	.400	T-5th	N/A	—	—	—	—
1988	Mike Gillespie	Pac-10	36	26	0	.581	13	17	0	.433	4th	N/A	NCAA West I Regional	18	13	—
1989	Mike Gillespie	Pac-10	41	25	0	.621	16	14	0	.533	3rd	N/A	NCAA Midwest Regional	18	26	—
1990	Mike Gillespie	Pac-10	40	22	0	.645	18	12	0	.600	3rd	N/A	NCAA South I Regional	6	11	—
1991	Mike Gillespie	Pac-10	46	17	1	.727	23	7	0	.767	1st	N/A	NCAA West I Regional	7	13	—
1992	Mike Gillespie	Pac-10	28	26	0	.519	13	17	0	.433	6th	N/A	—	—	—	—
1993	Mike Gillespie	Pac-10	35	29	0	.547	15	15	0	.500	4th	N/A	NCAA Central II Regional	19	18	20
1994	Mike Gillespie	Pac-10	41	20	0	.672	19	11	0	.633	3rd	N/A	NCAA South Regional	11	14	11
1995	Mike Gillespie	Pac-10	49	21	0	.700	21	9	0	.700	1st	2–0	College World Series Runners-up	2	2	2
1996	Mike Gillespie	Pac-10	44	16	1	.730	24	6	0	.800	1st	2–1	NCAA Central II Regional	7	9	9
1997	Mike Gillespie	Pac-10	42	20	0	.677	17	13	0	.567	3rd	—	NCAA South II Regional	10	13	10
1998	Mike Gillespie	Pac-10	49	17	0	.742	21	9	0	.700	2nd	—	National champions	1	1	1
1999	Mike Gillespie	Pac-10	36	26	0	.581	17	7	0	.708	2nd	N/A	NCAA Palo Alto Super Regional	10	12	13
2000	Mike Gillespie	Pac-10	44	20	0	.688	16	8	0	.667	T-4th	N/A	College World Series	5	5	4
2001	Mike Gillespie	Pac-10	45	19	0	.703	18	6	0	.750	1st	N/A	College World Series	4	5	4
2002	Mike Gillespie	Pac-10	37	24	0	.607	17	7	0	.708	1st	N/A	NCAA Palo Alto Super Regional	14	12	14
2003	Mike Gillespie	Pac-10	28	28	0	.500	11	13	0	.458	T-5th	N/A	—	—	—	—
2004	Mike Gillespie	Pac-10	24	32	0	.429	10	14	0	.417	T-6th	N/A	—	—	—	—
2005	Mike Gillespie	Pac-10	41	22	0	.651	15	9	0	.625	T-3rd	N/A	NCAA Corvallis Super Regional	17	17	17
2006	Mike Gillespie	Pac-10	25	33	0	.431	11	13	0	.458	T-5th	N/A	—	—	—	—
2007	Chad Kreuter	Pac-10	27	29	0	.482	8	16	0	.333	9th	N/A	—	—	—	—
2008	Chad Kreuter	Pac-10	28	28	0	.500	11	13	0	.458	T-6th	N/A	—	—	—	—
2009	Chad Kreuter	Pac-10	28	28	0	.500	13	14	0	.481	T-5th	N/A	—	—	—	—
2010	Chad Kreuter	Pac-10	28	32	0	.467	7	20	0	.259	10th	N/A	—	—	—	—
2011	Frank Cruz	Pac-10	25	31	0	.446	13	14	0	.481	7th	N/A	—	—	—	—
2012	Frank Cruz	Pac-12	25	32	0	.439	8	22	0	.267	10th	N/A	—	—	—	—
2013	Dan Hubbs	Pac-12	20	36	0	.357	10	20	0	.333	T-8th	N/A	—	—	—	—
2014	Dan Hubbs	Pac-12	29	24	0	.547	16	14	0	.533	T-5th	N/A	—	—	—	—
2015	Dan Hubbs	Pac-12	39	21	0	.650	18	12	0	.600	T-3rd	N/A	NCAA Lake Elsinore Regional	20	24	22
2016	Dan Hubbs	Pac-12	28	28	0	.500	15	15	0	.500	T-6th	N/A	—	—	—	—
2017	Dan Hubbs	Pac-12	21	34	0	.382	8	22	0	.267	T-10th	N/A	—	—	—	—
2018	Dan Hubbs	Pac-12	26	28	0	.481	12	18	0	.400	T-8th	N/A	—	—	—	—
2019	Dan Hubbs	Pac-12	25	29	1	.464	13	15	1	.466	7th	N/A	—	—	—	—
2020	Jason Gill	Pac-12	10	5	0	.667	Cancelled due to COVID-19					N/A	—	—	—	—
2021	Jason Gill	Pac-12	25	26	0	.490	13	17	0	.433	T-8th	N/A	—	—	—	—
2022	Jason Gill	Pac-12	25	28	0	.472	8	22	0	.267	11th	DNQ	—	—	—	—
2023	Andy Stankiewicz	Pac-12	34	22	1	.605	17	13	0	.567	4th	3rd place (Pool C)	—	—	—	—
2024	Andy Stankiewicz	Pac-12	31	28	0	.525	17	12	0	.586	4th	Finals	—	—	—	—
2025	Andy Stankiewicz	Big Ten	37	23	0	.617	18	12	0	.600	4th	2nd place (Pool D)	NCAA Corvallis Regional	—	—	—
2026	Andy Stankiewicz	Big Ten	42	14	0	.750	20	10	0	.667	4th	3rd place (semifinals)	NCAA College Station Regional	—	—	—
