= 2019 UCLA Bruins baseball team =

American college baseball season

2019 UCLA Bruins baseball

Los Angeles Regional champions Pac-12 regular season champions

NCAA tournament, Super Regional, (1–2)
- Conference: Pac-12 Conference

Ranking
- Coaches: No. 8
- CB: No. 9
- Record: 52–11 (24–5 Pac-12)
- Head coach: John Savage (15th season)
- Hitting coach: Bryant Ward (4th season)
- Pitching coach: Rex Peters (8th season)
- Home stadium: Jackie Robinson Stadium (Capacity: 1,820)

2019 Pac-12 Conference baseball standings
	Conf.						Overall
Team	W		L		T	PCT	W		L		T	PCT
No. 7 UCLA ‍†‍‍^{y}	24	–	5	–	0	.828	52	–	11	–	0	.825
No. 10 Stanford ‍‍‍^{y}	22	–	7	–	0	.759	45	–	14	–	0	.763
Oregon State ‍‍‍^{y}	21	–	8	–	0	.724	36	–	20	–	1	.640
California ‍‍‍^{y}	17	–	11	–	0	.607	32	–	20	–	0	.615
Arizona State ‍‍‍^{y}	16	–	13	–	0	.552	38	–	19	–	0	.667
Arizona ‍‍‍	15	–	14	–	0	.517	32	–	24	–	0	.571
USC ‍‍‍	13	–	15	–	1	.466	25	–	29	–	1	.464
Washington ‍‍‍	12	–	17	–	0	.414	28	–	24	–	0	.538
Oregon ‍‍‍	10	–	19	–	0	.345	27	–	29	–	0	.482
Utah ‍‍‍	6	–	24	–	0	.200	16	–	33	–	0	.327
Washington State ‍‍‍	3	–	25	–	1	.121	11	–	41	–	1	.217
† – Conference champion y – Invited to the NCAA tournament As of July 16, 2019; Rankings from D1Baseball

The 2019 UCLA Bruins baseball team represented the University of California, Los Angeles in the 2019 NCAA Division I baseball season as a member of the Pac-12 Conference. The team was coached by John Savage and played their home games at Jackie Robinson Stadium.

UCLA finished the regular season with a 47–8 overall record (24–5 in conference). They were the #1 ranked team for much of the year, and were awarded the #1 overall seed in the 2019 NCAA Division I baseball tournament.

== Previous season ==
The Bruins finished 38–21 overall, and 19–11 in the conference. During the season, the Bruins were invited and participated in the Dodger Stadium Classic in Los Angeles, California. UCLA was defeated by Vanderbilt and USC. In the postseason, the Bruins were invited and participated in the 2018 NCAA Division I baseball tournament, where they lost to Minnesota twice in the Corvallis Regional in Corvallis, Oregon.

=== MLB draft selections ===
The Bruins had four individuals selected in the 2018 MLB draft.

Player	Position	Round	Overall	MLB Team
Jake Bird	Pitcher	5	156	Colorado Rockies
Jon Olsen	Pitcher	12	364	Minnesota Twins
Danny Amaral	Left fielder	14	414	Pittsburgh Pirates
Jeremy Ydens	Outfielder	33	999	Arizona Diamondbacks

== Roster ==
2019 UCLA Bruins baseball team
Players
Coaches

#	Pos.	Name	B/T	Height	Weight	Year	Previous school	Home town
1	INF	Matt McLain	R/R	5 ft 9 in (1.75 m)	163 lb (74 kg)	Fr	Beckman High School	Tustin, California
3	INF	Ryan Kreidler	R/R	6 ft 4 in (1.93 m)	208 lb (94 kg)	Jr	Davis High School	Davis, California
4	INF	Kevin Kendall	L/R	5 ft 10 in (1.78 m)	166 lb (75 kg)	So	La Mirada High School	La Mirada, California
5	OF	Garrett Mitchell	L/R	6 ft 3 in (1.91 m)	204 lb (93 kg)	So	Orange Lutheran High School	Orange, California
6	INF	Jack Stronach	R/R	6 ft 3 in (1.91 m)	188 lb (85 kg)	Jr	Helix High School	La Mesa, California
7	INF	Mike Toglia	S/L	6 ft 5 in (1.96 m)	226 lb (103 kg)	Jr	Gig Harbor High School	Gig Harbor, Washington
8	OF	Jarron Silva (redshirt)	L/L	6 ft 1 in (1.85 m)	170 lb (77 kg)	RS So	Saint Mary's High School	Stockton, California
9	C	RJ Teijeiro	L/R	6 ft 0 in (1.83 m)	211 lb (96 kg)	So	Saint Francis High School	Foster City, California
10	INF	Mikey Perez	R/R	6 ft 0 in (1.83 m)	191 lb (87 kg)	Fr	Gahr High School	Cerritos, California
11	INF	Jake Moberg	R/R	6 ft 0 in (1.83 m)	189 lb (86 kg)	Fr	Vista Murrieta High School	Murrieta, California
12	LHP	Justin Hooper (redshirt)	L/L	6 ft 8 in (2.03 m)	238 lb (108 kg)	RS Jr	De La Salle High School	San Ramon, California
14	RHP	Sean Mullen	R/R	6 ft 1 in (1.85 m)	182 lb (83 kg)	Fr	Stockdale High School	Bakersfield, California
15	C	Will McInerny	R/R	5 ft 11 in (1.8 m)	172 lb (78 kg)	Jr	Laguna Beach High School	Laguna Beach, California
16	UTL	Kyle Cuellar	L/R	6 ft 0 in (1.83 m)	188 lb (85 kg)	Jr	La Salle High School	Arcadia, California
18	OF	Jeremy Ydens	R/R	6 ft 2 in (1.88 m)	200 lb (91 kg)	Jr	St. Francis High School	Campbell, California
19	RHP	Jack Ralston (redshirt)	R/R	6 ft 6 in (1.98 m)	231 lb (105 kg)	RS Jr	Hart High School	Santa Clarita, California
21	OF	Jordan Prendiz (redshirt)	L/L	5 ft 10 in (1.78 m)	180 lb (82 kg)	RS So	Mt. Whitney High School	Visalia, California
24	RHP	Zach Pettway	R/R	6 ft 1 in (1.85 m)	215 lb (98 kg)	So	Long Beach Wilson High School	Long Beach, California
25	C	Noah Cardenas	R/R	6 ft 1 in (1.85 m)	183 lb (83 kg)	Fr	Alemany High School	Santa Clarita, California
27	INF	Jack Filby	L/R	6 ft 0 in (1.83 m)	185 lb (84 kg)	Fr	C. K. McClatchy High School	Sacramento, California
28	INF	Jake Hirabayashi	R/R	5 ft 11 in (1.8 m)	188 lb (85 kg)	Sr	Notre Dame High School	Sherman Oaks, California
29	RHP	Michael Townsend	R/R	6 ft 1 in (1.85 m)	186 lb (84 kg)	So	Los Alamitos High School	Los Alamitos, California
30	RHP	Nick Nastrini	R/R	6 ft 3 in (1.91 m)	204 lb (93 kg)	Fr	Cathedral Catholic High School	San Diego, California
31	INF	JT Schwartz	L/R	6 ft 4 in (1.93 m)	197 lb (89 kg)	Fr	Corona del Mar High School	Newport Beach, California
32	RHP	Ryan Garcia	R/R	6 ft 0 in (1.83 m)	180 lb (82 kg)	Jr	La Salle High School	Sierra Madre, California
33	INF	Chase Strumpf	R/R	6 ft 1 in (1.85 m)	191 lb (87 kg)	Jr	JSerra Catholic High School	Dana Point, California
34	RHP	Felix Rubi	R/R	6 ft 2 in (1.88 m)	194 lb (88 kg)	Jr	Kennedy High School	Pacoima, California
35	RHP	Kyle Mora	R/R	6 ft 3 in (1.91 m)	201 lb (91 kg)	Jr	Los Alamitos High School	Los Alamitos, California
36	OF	Jake Pries	R/R	6 ft 4 in (1.93 m)	226 lb (103 kg)	Sr	JSerra Catholic High School	San Juan Capistrano, California
40	RHP	Holden Powell	R/R	6 ft 0 in (1.83 m)	180 lb (82 kg)	So	Mt. Whitney High School	Visalia, California
43	LHP	Daniel Colwell	L/L	6 ft 1 in (1.85 m)	171 lb (78 kg)	Fr	St. Mary's College High School	Berkeley, California
44	LHP	Nick Scheidler	L/L	6 ft 3 in (1.91 m)	192 lb (87 kg)	Jr	La Costa Canyon High School	Encinitas, California
45	RHP	Nathan Hadley (redshirt)	R/R	5 ft 11 in (1.8 m)	182 lb (83 kg)	RS Sr	Loyola High School	Los Angeles, California
51	RHP	Dennis Boatman	R/R	6 ft 5 in (1.96 m)	224 lb (102 kg)	Fr	Woodcreek High School	Roseville, California
55	RHP	Jesse Bergin	R/R	6 ft 4 in (1.93 m)	195 lb (88 kg)	Fr	Harvard-Westlake School	Studio City, California

Head coach

John Savage (Nevada)

Assistant coach(es)

- Rex Peters
- Bryant Ward

Legend

- (C) Team captain
- (S) Suspended
- (I) Ineligible
- Injured
- Current redshirt

Roster
Last update: May 30, 2019

== Schedule ==
2019 UCLA Bruins baseball season game log
Regular season

February
Date	Time	Opponent	Rank	Site stadium	Score	Win	Loss	Save	Attendance	Overall record (Pac-12 Record)
February 15	6:00 p.m.	St. John's	No. 3	Jackie Robinson Stadium; Los Angeles, California	3–2	**Filby (1–0)**	Mondak (0–1)	**Powell (1)**	653	1–0 (0–0)
February 16	2:00 p.m.	St. John's	No. 3	Jackie Robinson Stadium; Los Angeles, California	9–0	**Ralston (1–0)**	Belge (0–1)	–	1072	2–0 (0–0)
February 17	1:00 p.m.	St. John's	No. 3	Jackie Robinson Stadium; Los Angeles, California	11–1	**Bergin (1–0)**	LaSorsa (0–1)	–	841	3–0 (0–0)
February 19	6:00 p.m.	Loyola Marymount	No. 3	Jackie Robinson Stadium; Los Angeles, California	5–0	**Hadley (1–0)**	Finkelnburg (0–1)	–	516	4–0 (0–0)
February 22	1:00 p.m.	No. 19 Georgia Tech	No. 3	Russ Chandler Stadium; Atlanta, Georgia,	3–4^{11}	English (1–0)	**Mora (0–1)**	–	1134	4–1 (0–0)
February 23	11:00 a.m.	No. 19 Georgia Tech	No. 3	Russ Chandler Stadium; Atlanta, Georgia	8–2	**Ralston (2–0)**	Thomas (0–1)	–	1251	5–1 (0–0)
February 24	10:00 a.m.	No. 19 Georgia Tech	No. 3	Russ Chandler Stadium; Atlanta, Georgia	6–0	**Bergin (2–0)**	Hunter (0–1)	–	1501	6–1 (0–0)
February 26	2:00 p.m.	Cal State Northridge	No. 3	Matador Field; Northridge, California	4–3	**Hadley (2–0)**	Blaine (0–1)	**Powell (2)**	587	7–1 (0–0)

March
Date	Time	Opponent	Rank	Site stadium	Score	Win	Loss	Save	Attendance	Overall record (Pac-12 Record)
March 1	6:00 p.m.	Sacramento State	No. 3	Jackie Robinson Stadium; Los Angeles, California	2–1	**Mora (1–1)**	Roberts (1–1)	–	901	8–1 (0–0)
March 3	12:00 p.m.	Sacramento State; Doubleheader	No. 3	Jackie Robinson Stadium; Los Angeles, California	6–0	**Ralston (3–0)**	Randall (1–1)	–	903	9–1 (0–0)
March 3	3:30 p.m.	Sacramento State; Doubleheader	No. 3	Jackie Robinson Stadium; Los Angeles, California	1–2	Dalton (1–1)	**Powell (0–1)**	–	903	9–2 (0–0)
March 8	6:00 p.m.	No. 16 Michigan; Dodgertown Classic	No. 2	Jackie Robinson Stadium; Los Angeles, California	5–7	Henry (4–0)	**Pettway (0–1)**	Weiss (4)	1271	9–3 (0–0)
March 9	2:00 p.m.	Oklahoma State; Dodgertown Classic	No. 2	Jackie Robinson Stadium; Los Angeles, California	6–3	**Filby (2–0)**	Lyons (1–2)	**Powell (3)**	823	10–3 (0–0)
March 10	3:00 p.m.	USC; Dodgertown Classic/Rivalry	No. 2	Dodger Stadium; Los Angeles, California	7–5	**Hadley (3–0)**	Clarke (2–1)	**Powell (4)**	7053	11–3 (0–0)
March 12	6:00 p.m.	Long Beach State	No. 2	Blair Field; Long Beach, California	2–0	**Mullen (1–0)**	Gainey (0–1)	**Powell (5)**	1781	12–3 (0–0)
March 15	6:00 p.m.	No. 3 Oregon State	No. 2	Jackie Robinson Stadium; Los Angeles, California	8–0	**Pettway (1–1)**	Gambrell (0–1)	–	1056	13–3 (1–0)
March 16	6:00 p.m.	No. 3 Oregon State	No. 2	Jackie Robinson Stadium; Los Angeles, California	3–7	Eisert (5–0)	**Powell (0–2)**	–	1780	13–4 (1–1)
March 17	12:00 p.m.	No. 3 Oregon State	No. 2	Jackie Robinson Stadium; Los Angeles, California	9–7	**Garcia (1–0)**	Chamberlain (2–1)	**Powell (6)**	1250	14–4 (2–1)
March 22	6:00 p.m.	Arizona	No. 1	Jackie Robinson Stadium; Los Angeles, California	10–5	**Pettway (2–1)**	Labaut (2–2)	–	1042	15–4 (3–1)
March 23	2:00 p.m.	Arizona	No. 1	Jackie Robinson Stadium; Los Angeles, California	12–10	**Mora (2–1)**	Collins (0–2)	**Powell (7)**	1489	16–4 (4–1)
March 24	1:00 p.m.	Arizona	No. 1	Jackie Robinson Stadium; Los Angeles, California	3–1	**Powell (1–2)**	Sherman (1–1)	–	2094	17–4 (5–1)
March 26	6:00 p.m.	Loyola Marymount	No. 1	George C. Page Stadium; Los Angeles, California	9–4	**Hadley (4–0)**	Madole (0–1)	–	568	18–4 (5–1)
March 29	7:00 p.m.	USC; Rivalry	No. 1	Dedeaux Field; Los Angeles, California	2–7	Lunn (3–1)	**Pettway (2–2)**	–	511	18–5 (5–2)
March 30	4:00 p.m.	USC; Rivalry	No. 1	Dedeaux Field; Los Angeles, California	7–1	**Ralston (4–0)**	Esqueda (2–1)	–	810	19–5 (6–2)
March 31	4:00 p.m.	USC; Rivalry	No. 1	Dedeaux Field; Los Angeles, California	9–2	**Garcia (2–0)**	Hurt (0–4)	–	2054	20–5 (7–2)

April
Date	Time	Opponent	Rank	Site stadium	Score	Win	Loss	Save	Attendance	Overall record (Pac-12 Record)
April 2	6:00 p.m.	Cal State Northridge	No. 1	Jackie Robinson Stadium; Los Angeles, California	10–1	**Bergin (3–0)**	Hamm (2–2)	–	548	21–5 (7–2)
April 5	6:05 p.m.	Stanford	No. 1	Klein Field at Sunken Diamond; Stanford, California	2–3	Weiermiller (5–0)	**Mora (2–2)**	–	1860	21–6 (7–3)
April 6	2:05 p.m.	Stanford	No. 1	Klein Field at Sunken Diamond; Stanford, California	11–5	**Ralston (5–0)**	Palisch (2–1)	–	2316	22–6 (8–3)
April 7	1:05 p.m.	Stanford	No. 1	Klein Field at Sunken Diamond; Stanford, California	10–7	**Garcia (3–0)**	Matthiessen (1–1)	**Powell (8)**	2793	23–6 (9–3)
April 9	6:00 p.m.	UC Irvine	No. 1	Jackie Robinson Stadium; Los Angeles, California	9–3	**Bergin (4–0)**	Bocko (3–1)	–	497	24–6 (9–3)
April 12	6:00 p.m.	No. 8 East Carolina	No. 1	Jackie Robinson Stadium; Los Angeles, California	7–5	**Hadley (5–0)**	Voliva (4–2)	**Powell (9)**	1211	25–6 (9–3)
April 13	2:00 p.m.	No. 8 East Carolina; Doubleheader	No. 1	Jackie Robinson Stadium; Los Angeles, California	8–5	**Mora (3–2)**	Burleson (2–1)	–	1102	26–6 (9–3)
April 13	6:00 p.m.	No. 8 East Carolina; Doubleheader	No. 1	Jackie Robinson Stadium; Los Angeles, California	3–0	**Garcia (4–0)**	Kuchmaner (3–1)	**Powell (10)**	1102	27–6 (9–3)
April 15	6:00 p.m.	Pepperdine	No. 1	Jackie Robinson Stadium; Los Angeles, California	3–2	**Hadley (6–0)**	Slattery (0–1)	**Powell (11)**	567	28–6 (9–3)
April 18	7:00 p.m.	California	No. 1	Jackie Robinson Stadium; Los Angeles, California	8–7	**Powell (2–2)**	Sullivan (1–1)	–	1009	29–6 (10–3)
April 19	7:00 p.m.	California	No. 1	Jackie Robinson Stadium; Los Angeles, California	1–4	Horn (3–1)	**Hadley (6–1)**	Sabouri (3)	1497	29–7 (10–4)
April 20	2:00 p.m.	California	No. 1	Jackie Robinson Stadium; Los Angeles, California	6–1	**Ralston (6–0)**	Holman (2–2)	–	2126	30–7 (11–4)
April 23	6:00 p.m.	Cal State Fullerton	No. 1	Goodwin Field; Fullerton, California	8–3	**Bergin (4–0)**	Magrisi (0–2)	–	2089	31–7 (11–4)
April 26	6:00 p.m.	Utah	No. 1	Jackie Robinson Stadium; Los Angeles, California	5–0	**Garcia (5–0)**	Pierce (1–6)	–	800	32–7 (12–4)
April 27	2:00 p.m.	Utah	No. 1	Jackie Robinson Stadium; Los Angeles, California	6–1	**Ralston (7–0)**	Tedeschi (5–4)	–	990	33–7 (13–4)
April 28	1:00 p.m.	Utah	No. 1	Jackie Robinson Stadium; Los Angeles, California	6–4	**Townsend (1–0)**	Schramm (1–2)	**Powell (12)**	1468	34–7 (14–4)
April 30	3:00 p.m.	Pepperdine	No. 1	Eddy D. Field Stadium; Malibu, California	8–5	**Hadley (7–1)**	Salazar (1–4)	**Powell (13)**	374	35–7 (14–4)

May
Date	Time	Opponent	Rank	Site stadium	Score	Win	Loss	Save	Attendance	Overall record (Pac-12 Record)
May 3	7:00 p.m.	No. 16 Arizona State	No. 1	Phoenix Municipal Stadium; Phoenix, Arizona	3–2	**Garcia (6–0)**	Marsh (8–3)	**Powell (14)**	3878	36–7 (15–4)
May 4	3:00 p.m.	No. 16 Arizona State	No. 1	Phoenix Municipal Stadium; Phoenix, Arizona	18–3	**Ralston (8–0)**	Vander Kooi (4–2)	–	2753	37–7 (16–4)
May 5	2:00 p.m.	No. 16 Arizona State	No. 1	Phoenix Municipal Stadium; Phoenix, Arizona	7–8	Burzell (4–0)	**Powell (2–3)**	Dabovich (2)	2901	37–8 (16–5)
May 7	6:00 p.m.	Long Beach State	No. 1	Jackie Robinson Stadium; Los Angeles, California	2–1^{12}	**Powell (3–3)**	Gums (1–4)	–	841	38–8 (16–5)
May 10	5:05 p.m.	Washington State	No. 1	Bailey-Brayton Field; Pullman, Washington	6–2	**Garcia (7–0)**	Mills (1–4)	–	846	39–8 (17–5)
May 11	2:05 p.m.	Washington State	No. 1	Bailey-Brayton Field; Pullman, Washington	10–0	**Ralston (9–0)**	Block (0–7)	–	1034	40–8 (18–5)
May 12	12:05 p.m.	Washington State	No. 1	Bailey-Brayton Field; Pullman, Washington	13–10	**Hadley (8–1)**	Guerrero (1–2)	–	826	41–8 (19–5)
May 14	6:00 p.m.	UC Irvine	No. 1	Anteater Ballpark; Irvine, California	7–0	**Rubi (1–0)**	Rashi (4–1)	–	1575	42–8 (19–5)
May 17	6:00 p.m.	Washington	No. 1	Jackie Robinson Stadium; Los Angeles, California	8–3	**Garcia (8–0)**	Rhodes (5–5)	–	1587	43–8 (20–5)
May 18	7:00 p.m.	Washington	No. 1	Jackie Robinson Stadium; Los Angeles, California	4–0	**Ralston (10–0)**	Jones (4–5)	–	1542	44–8 (21–5)
May 19	12:00 p.m.	Washington	No. 1	Jackie Robinson Stadium; Los Angeles, California	14–4	**Townsend (2–0)**	Burgmann (4–6)	–	1786	45–8 (22–5)
May 23	6:00 p.m.	Oregon	No. 1	PK Park; Eugene, Oregon	4–2	**Garcia (9–0)**	Ahlstrom (5–7)	**Powell (15)**	1068	46–8 (23–5)
May 24	6:00 p.m.	Oregon	No. 1	PK Park; Eugene, Oregon	6–5	**Ralston (11–0)**	Walker (2–2)	**Powell (16)**	1416	47–8 (24–5)
May 25	4:00 p.m.	Oregon	No. 1	PK Park; Eugene, Oregon	**Cancelled**					

NCAA tournament – Los Angeles Regional
Date	Time	Opponent	Rank	Site stadium	Score	Win	Loss	Save	Attendance	Overall record
May 31	7:00 p.m. ESPN3	(4) Omaha; Quarterfinals	(1) No. 1	Jackie Robinson Stadium; Los Angeles, California	5–2	**Garcia (10–0)**	Kinney (11–2)	**Mora (1)**	1,751	48–8
June 1	7:00 p.m. ESPNU	(3) Loyola Marymount; Semifinals	(1) No. 1	Jackie Robinson Stadium; Los Angeles, California	2–3	Fernandezees (4–1)	**Ralston (11–1)**	Frasso (10)	2,014	48–9
June 2	12:00 p.m. ESPN2	(2) Baylor; Elimination game	(1) No. 1	Jackie Robinson Stadium; Los Angeles, California	11–6	**Rubi (2–0)**	Thomas (1–2)	–	1,911	49–9
June 2	6:00 p.m. ESPN3	(3) Loyola Marymount; Regional Final	(1) No. 1	Jackie Robinson Stadium; Los Angeles, California	6–1	**Nastrini (1–0)**	Voelker (2–5)	–	1,957	50–9
June 3	7:00 p.m. ESPN2	(3) Loyola Marymount; Regional Final	(1) No. 1	Jackie Robinson Stadium; Los Angeles, California	6–3	**Townsend (3–0)**	Fernandezees (4–2)	**Powell (17)**	1,955	51–9
June 7	6:00 p.m. ESPN2	Michigan; Super Regional Game 1	No. 1	Jackie Robinson Stadium; Los Angeles, California	2–3	Kauffmann (10–6)	**Garcia (10–1)**	Criswell (1)	1,904	51–10
June 8	6:00 p.m. ESPN2	Michigan; Super Regional Game 2	No. 1	Jackie Robinson Stadium; Los Angeles, California	5–4^{12}	**Powell (4–3)**	Cleveland (4–3)	–	1,967	52–10
June 9	6:00 p.m. ESPN2	Michigan; Super Regional Game 3	No. 1	Jackie Robinson Stadium; Los Angeles, California	2–4	Henry (10–5)	**Mora (3–3)**	Keizer (2)	2,031	52–11

- Bruins win
- Bruins loss
- Bold: Bruins team member
- Source: UCLA
- Rankings from Baseball America.
- (#) Tournament seedings in parentheses.
- All times are in Pacific Time.

== Rankings ==
Ranking movements Legend: ██ Increase in ranking ██ Decrease in ranking
	Week																		
Poll	Pre	1	2	3	4	5	6	7	8	9	10	11	12	13	14	15	16	17	Final
Coaches'	7	7*	7	4	3	1	1	1	1	1	1	1	1	1	1	1	1	1	8
Baseball America	3	3	3	2	2	1	1	1	1	1	1	1	1	1	1	1	1	1	6
Collegiate Baseball^	3	3	3	6	6	3	2	3	1	1	1	1	1	1	1	1	1	9	9
NCBWA†	4	3	4	3	4	1	1	1	1	1	1	1	1	1	1	1	1	1	9
D1Baseball	5	4	4	2	2	1	1	1	1	1	1	1	1	1	1	1	1	1	7

^ Collegiate Baseball ranked 40 teams in their preseason poll, but only ranked 30 teams weekly during the season.
† NCBWA ranks 30 teams in their preseason poll, but only ranks 25 teams weekly during the season.
* A new poll was not released for this week, so for comparison purposes, the previous week's ranking is inserted in this week's slot.

== 2019 MLB draft ==
The Bruins had 13 players selected in the draft, tying a program record, and tying Vanderbilt for most in the 2019 draft.

Player	Position	Round	Overall	MLB team
Michael Toglia	1B	1	23	Colorado Rockies
Ryan Garcia	RHP	2	50	Texas Rangers
Chase Strumpf	2B	2	64	Chicago Cubs
Ryan Kreidler	3B	4	112	Detroit Tigers
Jack Ralston	RHP	7	215	St. Louis Cardinals
Jeremy Ydens	OF	8	243	Washington Nationals
Justin Hooper	LHP	14	409	Kansas City Royals
Jack Stronach	OF	21	623	San Diego Padres
Jake Pries	OF	24	735	New York Yankees
Nate Hadley	RHP	25	749	Minnesota Twins
Kyle Molnar	RHP	26	781	Los Angeles Dodgers
Jake Hirabayashi	INF	39	1,169	Minnesota Twins
Ty Haselman	C	40	1,211	Los Angeles Dodgers
