= Yann Kamagate =

Burkinabè basketball player (born 2008)

Saint Francis Golden Knights
- Position: Center

Personal information
- Born: September 30, 2008 (age 18) Burkina Faso
- Listed height: 7 ft 0 in (2.13 m)
- Listed weight: 230 lb (104 kg)

Career information
- High school: Saint Francis (La Cañada Flintridge, California)

Yann Kamagate (born September 30, 2008) is a Burkinabè basketball player at Saint Francis High School in La Cañada Flintridge, California. He is a five-star recruit and the number one-ranked prospect in the class of 2028.

== Early life ==
Kamagate was born on September 30, 2008, in Burkina Faso. He grew up in Burkina Faso before moving to the United States in 2025, enrolling at Saint Francis High School in La Cañada Flintridge, California. Luc Mbah a Moute, a Cameroonian former NBA player, is his guardian and agent. Mbah a Moute is also the guardian for Cherif Millogo, one of Kamagate's Saint Francis teammates who is also from Burkina Faso. During his sophomore basketball season at Saint Francis in 2025–26, Kamagate did not play due to a wrist injury that required surgery.

Kamagate began receiving attention after having a breakout performance at the 17U Adidas 3SSB Circuit in May 2026. After his first two sessions, he was named first-team all-camp after recording averages of 13.9 points, 10.4 rebounds and 2.9 blocks per game with the U17 Compton Magic, with his team going undefeated in eight games. Kamagate led the U17 Circuit in rebounds per game in the first two sessions. He then competed at the NBPA Top 100 Camp and averaged 14.3 points and 9.3 rebounds.

Until his performance at the Adidas 3SSB Circuit, Kamagate was an unranked recruit in the class of 2028. However, his performance led to him rising to be the top player in his class, being ranked first nationally by ESPN, 247Sports and Rivals.com. On May 18, 2026, he received a scholarship offer from the Kentucky Wildcats, becoming the first player from the class of 2028 to receive an offer from the team. He has received offers from numerous other top NCAA Division I programs as well.
