= 2019 Oregon State Beavers baseball team =

American college baseball season

2019 Oregon State Beavers baseball

NCAA tournament, Corvallis Regional
- Conference: Pac-12 Conference

Ranking
- Coaches: No. 23
- CB: No. 20
- Record: 36–20–1 (21–8 Pac-12)
- Head coach: Pat Bailey (interim) (1st season)
- Assistant coaches: Nate Yeskie (11th season); Andy Jenkins (7th season); Ryan Gipson (1st season)
- Home stadium: Goss Stadium at Coleman Field

2019 Pac-12 Conference baseball standings
	Conf.						Overall
Team	W		L		T	PCT	W		L		T	PCT
No. 7 UCLA ‍†‍‍^{y}	24	–	5	–	0	.828	52	–	11	–	0	.825
No. 10 Stanford ‍‍‍^{y}	22	–	7	–	0	.759	45	–	14	–	0	.763
Oregon State ‍‍‍^{y}	21	–	8	–	0	.724	36	–	20	–	1	.640
California ‍‍‍^{y}	17	–	11	–	0	.607	32	–	20	–	0	.615
Arizona State ‍‍‍^{y}	16	–	13	–	0	.552	38	–	19	–	0	.667
Arizona ‍‍‍	15	–	14	–	0	.517	32	–	24	–	0	.571
USC ‍‍‍	13	–	15	–	1	.466	25	–	29	–	1	.464
Washington ‍‍‍	12	–	17	–	0	.414	28	–	24	–	0	.538
Oregon ‍‍‍	10	–	19	–	0	.345	27	–	29	–	0	.482
Utah ‍‍‍	6	–	24	–	0	.200	16	–	33	–	0	.327
Washington State ‍‍‍	3	–	25	–	1	.121	11	–	41	–	1	.217
† – Conference champion y – Invited to the NCAA tournament As of July 16, 2019; Rankings from D1Baseball

The 2019 Oregon State Beavers baseball team began the season as the defending national champion and represented Oregon State University in the 2019 NCAA Division I baseball season. Despite a successful season that saw them ranked as high as No. 1 and selected to host the first round of the 2019 NCAA Division I baseball tournament, the Beavers were eliminated from the first round of the Corvallis Regional.

For the first time in 24 seasons, the team was led by someone other than head coach Pat Casey, who retired from Oregon State following their third national championship under his stewardship. Associate head coach Pat Bailey was given the title of interim head coach, leading to speculation that Pat Casey could return. On June 4, 2019, Oregon State Athletic Director Scott Barnes released a statement that Casey would not exercise his option to return as head coach but would remain in his current position as senior associate athletic director and be a consultant during the search for a new head coach. On June 13, 2019, Mitch Canham, former All-American and player on the 2006 and 2007 national championship teams, was hired as head coach.

== Roster ==
2019 Oregon State Beavers roster
Pitchers: 11 Andrew Walling - Freshman; 12 Sam Tweedt - (redshirt) Senior; 19 Jake Pfennigs - Freshman; 22 Grant Gambrell - Junior; 23 Kevin Abel - Sophomore; 24 Nathan Burns - Sophomore; 25 Joey Mundt - Freshman; 26 Bryce Fehmel - Senior; 29 Bret Soulages - Freshman; 32 Mitchell Verburg - (redshirt) Sophomore; 34 Christian Chamberlain - Sophomore; 37 Brandon Eisert - Junior; 38 Jake Mulholland - Junior; 49 Dylan Pearce - Senior	Infielders: 1 Kyler McMahan - Sophomore; 2 Jake Harvey - Freshman; 3 Matthew Gretler - Freshman; 4 Beau Philip - Junior; 7 Tyler Malone - Junior; 9 Andy Armstrong - Junior; 13 George Mendazona - (redshirt) Sophomore; 15 Jake Dukart - Freshman; 18 Ryan Ober - Sophomore; 20 Zach Clayton - Sophomore; 28 Wade Meckler - Freshman; 44 Alex McGarry - (redshirt) Sophomore	Catchers: 16 Zak Taylor - Senior; 17 Troy Claunch - Sophomore; 30 Zack Zalesky - (redshirt) Sophomore; 35 Adley Rutschman - Junior; Outfielders: 6 Joe Casey - (redshirt) Sophomore; 14 Elliot Willy - (redshirt) Sophomore; 33 Preston Jones - Junior; 36 Greg Fuchs - Freshman; 40 Carter Booth - Freshman

= Injured = Redshirt

== Schedule and results ==
Legend
	Oregon State win
	Oregon State loss
	Postponement/Tie
**Bold**	Oregon State team member

2019 Oregon State Beavers baseball game log
Regular season

February
Date	Opponent	Rank	Site/stadium	Score	Win	Loss	Save	Attendance	Overall record	PAC-12 Record
Feb 15	vs. New Mexico*	No. 8	Surprise Stadium • Surprise, AZ (Sanderson Ford College Baseball Classic)	**W** 6–5	Eisert (1–0)	Emond (0–1)	None	1,947	1–0	
Feb 16	vs. Gonzaga*	No. 8	Surprise Stadium • Surprise, AZ (Sanderson Ford College Baseball Classic)	**W** 9–3	Fehmel (1–0)	Jacob (0–1)	None	2,469	2–0	
Feb 17	vs. No. 28 Minnesota*	No. 8	Surprise Stadium • Surprise, AZ (Sanderson Ford College Baseball Classic)	**W** 13–1	Burns (1–0)	Thoresen (0–1)	None	2,688	3–0	
Feb 18	vs. New Mexico*	No. 8	Surprise Stadium • Surprise, AZ (Sanderson Ford College Baseball Classic)	**W** 5–0	Eisert (2–0)	Gillespie (0–1)	None	1,624	4–0	
Feb 21	vs. Nebraska*	No. 7	Surprise Stadium • Surprise, AZ	**POSTPONED DUE TO WEATHER**						
Feb 22	vs. Nebraska*	No. 7	Surprise Stadium • Surprise, AZ	**W** 8–2	Abel (1–0)	Luensmann (0–1)	None	1,453	5–0	
Feb 22	vs. Nebraska*	No. 7	Surprise Stadium • Surprise, AZ	**W** 5–3	Eisert (3–0)	Palkert (0–1)	**Mulholland (1)**	1,453	6–0	
Feb 23	vs. Nebraska*	No. 7	Surprise Stadium • Surprise, AZ	**W** 17–1	Tweedt (1–0)	Fisher (1–1)	None	2,114	7–0	
Feb 24	vs. Nebraska*	No. 7	Surprise Stadium • Surprise, AZ	**W** 8–3	Eisert (4–0)	Gomes (0–1)	None	1,387	8–0	

March
Date	Opponent	Rank	Site/stadium	Score	Win	Loss	Save	Attendance	Overall record	PAC-12 Record
Mar 1	West Virginia*	No. 6	Goss Stadium at Coleman Field • Corvallis, OR	**W** 9–2	**Abel (2–0)**	Manoah (1–1)	None	3,535	9–0	
Mar 2	West Virginia*	No. 6	Goss Stadium at Coleman Field • Corvallis, OR	**W** 4–2	**Fehmel (2–0)**	Wolf (2–1)	**Chamberlain (1)**	3,669	10–0	
Mar 3	West Virginia*	No. 6	Goss Stadium at Coleman Field • Corvallis, OR	**L** 0–2	Strowd (1–1)	**Tweedt (1–1)**	Kessler (2)	3,588	10–1	
Mar 8	Minnesota*	No. 4	T-Mobile Park • Seattle, WA	**W** 2–1	**Chamberlain (1–0)**	Meyer (0–1)	None	1,500	11–1	
Mar 9	Indiana*	No. 4	T-Mobile Park • Seattle, WA	**W** 8–3	**Fehmel (3–0)**	Gordon (0–3)	**Mulholland (2)**	3,000	12–1	
Mar 10	No. 12 Coastal Carolina*	No. 4	T-Mobile Park • Seattle, WA	**T** 4–4	None	None	None	3,000	12–1–1	
Mar 12	Oregon*	No. 3	Goss Stadium at Coleman Field • Corvallis, OR	**W** 7–6	**Chamberlain (2–0)**	Somers (0–2)	**Mulholland (3)**	3,441	13–1–1	
Mar 15	at No. 6 UCLA	No. 3	Jackie Robinson Stadium • Los Angeles, CA	**L** 0–8	Pettway (1–1)	**Gambrell (0–1)**	None	1,056	13–2–1	0–1
Mar 16	at No. 6 UCLA	No. 3	Jackie Robinson Stadium • Los Angeles, CA	**W** 7–3	**Eisert (5–0)**	Powell (0–2)	None	1,780	14–2–1	1–1
Mar 17	at No. 6 UCLA	No. 3	Jackie Robinson Stadium • Los Angeles, CA	**L** 7–9	Garcia (1–0)	**Chamberlain (2–1)**	Powell (6)	1,250	14–3–1	1–2
Mar 22	California	No. 7	Goss Stadium at Coleman Field • Corvallis, OR	**L** 3–2	Stoutenborou (3–3)	**Chamberlain (2–2)**	Sabouri (2)	3,459	14–4–1	1–3
Mar 23	California	No. 7	Goss Stadium at Coleman Field • Corvallis, OR	**W** 3–2	**Fehmel (4–0)**	Reyes (1–1)	**Mulholland (4)**	3,749	15–4–1	2-3
Mar 24	California	No. 7	Goss Stadium at Coleman Field • Corvallis, OR	**W** 10–5	**Gambrell (1–1)**	Sabouri (2–2)	None	3,726	16-4–1	3–3
Mar 26	Portland*	No. 7	Ron Tonkin Field • Hillsboro, OR	**L** 1–5	Clements (5–0)	**Pfennigs (0–1)**	None	4,648	16–5–1	3–3
Mar 29	at Washington	No. 7	Husky Ballpark • Seattle, WA	**W** 1–0	**Eisert (6–0)**	Rhodes (4–2)	**Verburg (1)**	1,483	17–5–1	4–3
Mar 30	at Washington	No. 7	Husky Ballpark • Seattle, WA	**W** 10–7	**Verburg (1–0)**	Micheles (2–1)	None	2,161	18–5–1	5–3
Mar 31	at Washington	No. 7	Husky Ballpark • Seattle, WA	**W** 4–3	**Mulholland (1–0)**	Emanuels (2–3)	None	1,721	19–5–1	6–3

April
Date	Opponent	Rank	Site/stadium	Score	Win	Loss	Save	Attendance	Overall record	PAC-12 Record
Apr 2	San Diego State*	No. 6	Goss Stadium at Coleman Field • Corvallis, OR	**L** 3–4	Mardueno (2–1)	**Tweedt (1–2)**	None	3,268	19–6–1	6–3
Apr 3	San Diego State*	No. 6	Goss Stadium at Coleman Field • Corvallis, OR	**W** 8–1	**Pfennigs (1–1)**	Ritcheson (1–1)	None	3,247	20–6–1	6–3
Apr 5	at Utah	No. 6	Goss Stadium at Coleman Field • Corvallis, OR	**W** 6–2	**Eisert (7–0)**	Robeniol (1–4)	None	3,463	21–6–1	7–3
Apr 6	at Utah	No. 6	Goss Stadium at Coleman Field • Corvallis, OR	**W** 11–0	**Fehmel (5–0)**	Tedeschi (3–3)	None	3,693	22–6–1	8–3
Apr 6	at Utah	No. 6	Goss Stadium at Coleman Field • Corvallis, OR	**W** 3–2	**Mulholland (2–0)**	McCleve (1–2)	None	3,476	23–6–1	9–3
Apr 9	Oregon*	No. 4	Goss Stadium at Coleman Field • Corvallis, OR	**L** 8–12	Tellache (4–1)	**Chamberlain (2–3)**	None	3,471	23–7–1	9–3
Apr 12	at No. 13 Arizona State	No. 4	Phoenix Municipal Stadium • Phoenix, AZ	**L** 1–4	Marsh (8–1)	**Eisert (7–1)**	None	3,410	23–8–1	9–4
Apr 13	at No. 13 Arizona State	No. 4	Phoenix Municipal Stadium • Phoenix, AZ	**W** 6–4	**Chamberlain (3–3)**	Corrigan (3–2)	**Mulholland (5)**	4,080	24–8–1	10–4
Apr 14	at No. 13 Arizona State	No. 4	Phoenix Municipal Stadium • Phoenix, AZ	**W** 4–3	**Gambrell (2–1)**	Romero (2–2)	**Verburg (2)**	3,241	25–8–1	11–4
Apr 18	Arizona	No. 2	Goss Stadium at Coleman Field • Corvallis, OR	**W** 8–4	**Pearce (1–0)**	Luna (1–2)	None	3,616	26–8–1	12–4
Apr 19	Arizona	No. 2	Goss Stadium at Coleman Field • Corvallis, OR	**POSTPONED DUE TO WEATHER**						
Apr 20	Arizona	No. 2	Goss Stadium at Coleman Field • Corvallis, OR	**W** 15–3	**Fehmel (6–0)**	Flanagan (4–3)	None	3,790	27–8–1	13–4
Apr 20	Arizona	No. 2	Goss Stadium at Coleman Field • Corvallis, OR	**W** 9–3	**Gambrell (3–1)**	Nardi (3–4)	None	3,931	28–8–1	14–4
Apr 22	at Nevada*	No. 2	William Peccole Park • Reno, NV	**L** 7–8	Ford (3–1)	**Pearce (1–1)**	None	1,347	28–9–1	14–4
Apr 23	at Nevada*	No. 2	William Peccole Park • Reno, NV	**L** 6–7	Ford (4–1)	**Mulholland (2–1)**	None	1,120	28–10–1	14–4
Apr 26	Washington State	No. 2	Goss Stadium at Coleman Field • Corvallis, OR	**W** 18–4	**Eisert (8–1)**	Bush (0–4)	**Mundt (1)**	3,800	29–10–1	15–4
Apr 27	Washington State	No. 2	Goss Stadium at Coleman Field • Corvallis, OR	**W** 4–3	**Mulholland (3–1)**	Barison (0–2)	None	3,952	30–10–1	16–4
Apr 28	Washington State	No. 2	Goss Stadium at Coleman Field • Corvallis, OR	**W** 2–0	**Gambrell (4–1)**	White (2–7)	**Chamberlain (2)**	3,968	31–10–1	17–4
Apr 30	Gonzaga*	No. 3	Goss Stadium at Coleman Field • Corvallis, OR	**L** 3–6	Trogrlic (2–2)	**Pearce (1–2)**	None	3,423	31–11–1	17–4

May
Date	Opponent	Rank	Site/stadium	Score	Win	Loss	Save	Attendance	Overall record	PAC-12 Record
May 3	Oklahoma State*	No. 3	Goss Stadium at Coleman Field • Corvallis, OR	**L** 0–1	Elliott (6–3)	**Eisert (8–2)**	Battenfield (1)	3,881	31–12–1	17–4
May 4	Oklahoma State*	No. 3	Goss Stadium at Coleman Field • Corvallis, OR	**L** 2–5	Gragg (3–3)	**Fehmel (6–1)**	None	3,912	31–13–1	17–4
May 5	Oklahoma State*	No. 3	Goss Stadium at Coleman Field • Corvallis, OR	**L** 7–8	Lyons (3–2)	**Mulholland (3–2)**	Leeper (5)	3,923	31–14–1	17–4
May 10	at Oregon	No. 12	PK Park • Eugene, OR	**W** 4–1	**Fehmel (7–1)**	Ahlstrom (5–5)	None	3,671	32–14–1	18–4
May 11	at Oregon	No. 12	PK Park • Eugene, OR	**W** 8–5	**Pearce (2–2)**	Kafka (5–5)	**Mulholland (6)**	4,130	33–14–1	19–4
May 12	at Oregon	No. 12	PK Park • Eugene, OR	**L** 2–3	Nelson (3–4)	**Chamberlain (3–4)**	None	3,531	33–15–1	19–5
May 14	Portland*	No. 11	Goss Stadium at Coleman Field • Corvallis, OR	**W** 4–3	**Burns (2–0)**	Richman (1–2)	**Mulholland (7)**	3,372	34–15–1	19–5
May 17	at No. 3 Stanford	No. 11	Sunken Diamond • Stanford, CA	**L** 5–8	Palisch (3–1)	**Fehmel (7–2)**	Little (9)	1,990	34–16–1	19–6
May 18	at No. 3 Stanford	No. 11	Sunken Diamond • Stanford, CA	**CANCELLED DUE TO WEATHER**						
May 19	at No. 3 Stanford	No. 11	Sunken Diamond • Stanford, CA	**W** 5–2	**Gambrell (5–1)**	Miller (7–2)	**Mulholland (8)**	2,000	35–16–1	20–6
May 23	USC	No. 12	Goss Stadium at Coleman Field • Corvallis, OR	**L** 0–2	Beller (2–2)	**Fehmel (7–3)**	Clarke (7)	3,779	35–17–1	20–7
May 24	USC	No. 12	Goss Stadium at Coleman Field • Corvallis, OR	**W** 5–2	**Pearce (3–2)**	Lunn (7–4)	**Pfennigs (1)**	3,951	36–17–1	21–7
May 25	USC	No. 12	Goss Stadium at Coleman Field • Corvallis, OR	**L** 0–5	Hurt (3–7)	**Gambrell (5–2)**	Clarke (8)	4,018	36–18–1	21–8

Postseason

Corvallis Regional
Date	Opponent	Rank	Site/stadium	Score	Win	Loss	Save	Attendance	Overall record	Regional Record
May 31	(4) Cincinnati	No. 16 (1)	Goss Stadium at Coleman Field • Corvallis, OR	**L** 5–6	Moore (4–0)	**Mulholland (3–3)**	Thompson (13)	3,824	36–19–1	0–1
June 1	No. 22 (2) Creighton	No. 16 (1)	Goss Stadium at Coleman Field • Corvallis, OR	**L** 1–4	Johnson (9–1)	**Gambrell (5–3)**	Sakowski (3)	3,402	36–20–1	0–2

== Corvallis Regional ==
Corvallis Regional Teams
(1) Oregon State Beavers	(2) Creighton Bluejays	(3) Michigan Wolverines	(4) Cincinnati Bearcats

First round
1	Oregon State	5
4	Cincinnati	6
3	Michigan	6
2	Creighton	0
Lower round 1
1	Oregon State	1
2	Creighton	4

Semi-finals
4	Cincinnati	4
3	Michigan	10
Lower final
2	Creighton	6
4	Cincinnati	1

Finals
3	Michigan	7	17
2	Creighton	11	6

== Rankings ==
Ranking movements Legend: ██ Increase in ranking ██ Decrease in ranking — = Not ranked
	Week																			
Poll	Pre	1	2	3	4	5	6	7	8	9	10	11	12	13	14	15	16	17	18	Final
Coaches'	5	5*	5*	2	1	2	7	6	3	4	2	4	11	12	12	14	14*	14*	14*	23
Baseball America	10	10	10	7	6	7	8	7	7	5	4	4	12	11	11	16	16*	16*	16*	19
Collegiate Baseball^	7	7	5	3	3	4	7	6	5	4	3	5	11	10	10	12	20	20	20*	20
NCBWA†	5	5	3	2	2	4	7	4	2	4	3	4	12	12	12	12	12*	12*	12*	21
D1Baseball	8	7	6	4	3	7	7	6	4	2	2	3	12	11	12	16	16*	16*	16*	—

^ Collegiate Baseball ranked 40 teams in their preseason poll, but only ranked 30 teams weekly during the season.
† NCBWA ranks 30 teams in their preseason poll, but only ranks 25 teams weekly during the season.
* A new poll was not released for this week, so for comparison purposes, the previous week's ranking is inserted in this week's slot.

== Awards ==
Adley Rutschman: Golden Spikes Award; Dick Howser Trophy; Buster Posey Award; Baseball America National Player of the Year; Collegiate Baseball National Player of the Year; Perfect Game National Player of the Year; D1Baseball.com National Player of the Year; Consensus First-Team All-American; Pac-12 Player of the Year; Pac-12 co-Defensive Player of the Year; Pac-12 Batting Champion (.419 avg); All-Pac-12 First Team; All-Pac-12 Defensive Team; NCBWA National player of the Month (April); Two-time Pac-12 Player of the Week (March 19, April 8); Rest of team Pac-12 All Conference First Team: Alex McGarry; Jake Mulholland; Pac-12 All Defensive Team: Bryce Fehmel; Pac-12 Honorable Mention: Andy Armstrong; Brandon Eisert; Bryce Fehmel; Grant Gambrell; Preston Jones; Beau Philip; Mitchell Verburg

== Major League Baseball draft ==
Adley Rutschman became the first player in Oregon State history to be the #1 Major League Baseball pick when the Baltimore Orioles selected him first overall in the 2019 MLB draft . The previous highest pick was Nick Madrigal, who was selected 4th overall by the Chicago White Sox in the 2018 MLB draft.

2019 MLB Draft results
Player	Position	Round	Overall	MLB team
Adley Rutschman	C	1st	1st	Baltimore Orioles
Beau Philip	SS	2nd	60th	Atlanta Braves
Grant Gambrell	RHP	3rd	80th	Kansas City Royals
Brandon Eisert	LHP	18th	537th	Toronto Bluejays
Bryce Fehmel	RHP	21st	626th	San Francisco Giants
Tyler Malone	OF	27th	803rd	San Diego Padres
