= Patrick Bailey (disambiguation) =

Patrick Bailey (born 1999), is an American professional baseball catcher for the San Francisco Giants of Major League Baseball.

Patrick Bailey may also refer to:

- Pat Bailey (born 1956), American baseball coach
- Patrick Bailey (American football) (born 1985), American footballer
