= 2019 Arizona State Sun Devils baseball team =

American college baseball season

2019 Arizona State Sun Devils baseball

Baton Rouge Regional, 1–2
- Conference: Pac-12 Conference
- Record: 38–19 (16-13 Pac-12)
- Head coach: Tracy Smith (5th season)
- Assistant coaches: Mike Cather (2nd season); Ben Greenspan (3rd season); Michael Earley (3rd season)
- Home stadium: Phoenix Municipal Stadium

2019 Pac-12 Conference baseball standings
	Conf.						Overall
Team	W		L		T	PCT	W		L		T	PCT
No. 7 UCLA ‍†‍‍^{y}	24	–	5	–	0	.828	52	–	11	–	0	.825
No. 10 Stanford ‍‍‍^{y}	22	–	7	–	0	.759	45	–	14	–	0	.763
Oregon State ‍‍‍^{y}	21	–	8	–	0	.724	36	–	20	–	1	.640
California ‍‍‍^{y}	17	–	11	–	0	.607	32	–	20	–	0	.615
Arizona State ‍‍‍^{y}	16	–	13	–	0	.552	38	–	19	–	0	.667
Arizona ‍‍‍	15	–	14	–	0	.517	32	–	24	–	0	.571
USC ‍‍‍	13	–	15	–	1	.466	25	–	29	–	1	.464
Washington ‍‍‍	12	–	17	–	0	.414	28	–	24	–	0	.538
Oregon ‍‍‍	10	–	19	–	0	.345	27	–	29	–	0	.482
Utah ‍‍‍	6	–	24	–	0	.200	16	–	33	–	0	.327
Washington State ‍‍‍	3	–	25	–	1	.121	11	–	41	–	1	.217
† – Conference champion y – Invited to the NCAA tournament As of July 16, 2019; Rankings from D1Baseball

The 2019 Arizona State Sun Devils baseball team represented Arizona State University in the 2019 NCAA Division I baseball season. The Sun Devils played their home games at Phoenix Municipal Stadium, off campus in Phoenix, Arizona. Tracy Smith was in his fifth season as the Arizona State Sun Devils baseball head coach.

== Personnel ==
=== Roster ===
2019 Arizona State Sun Devils roster
Pitchers: 3 Chaz Montoya, LHP Junior; 8 Alec Marsh, RHP Junior; 11 RJ Dabovich, RHP Sophomore; 12 Will Levine, RHP Freshman; 15 Erik Tolman, LHP Freshman; 19 Boyd Vander Kooi, RHP Sophomore; 22 Colby Davis, RHP Sophomore; 24 Blake Burzell, RHP Freshman; 26 Sam Romero, RHP Senior; 29 Luke La Flam, RHP Freshman; 30 Brady Corrigan, RHP Sophomore; 35 Dom Cacchione, RHP Freshman; Catchers: 9 Sam Ferri, (redshirt) Sophomore; 27 Lyle Lin, Junior; 38 Keolu Ramos, Junior; 40 Nick Cheema, Junior	Infield: 5 Alika Williams, Sophomore; 6 Drew Swift, Sophomore; 14 Gage Workman, Sophomore; 20 Spencer Torkelson, Sophomore; 21 Carter Aldrete, Junior; 28 Cole Austin, (redshirt) Junior; 31 Marc Lidd, Freshman; Outfielders: 4 Hunter Bishop, Junior; 10 Dusty Garcia, Freshman; 17 Myles Denson, Junior; 18 Trevor Hauver, Sophomore

== Schedule and results ==
Legend
	ASU win
	ASU loss
	Postponement
**Bold**	Arizona State team member

2019 Arizona State Sun Devils baseball game log
Regular season (37–17)
February (8–0)

Date	Opponent	Rank	Site/stadium	Score	Win	Loss	Save	TV	Attendance	Overall Record	Pac-12 Record
Feb. 15	vs. Notre Dame		Phoenix Municipal Stadium • Phoenix, AZ	10–1	**Marsh** (1-0)	Sheehan (0-1)			2,630	1-0	-
Feb. 16	vs. Notre Dame		Phoenix Municipal Stadium • Phoenix, AZ	20–7	**Burzell** (1-0)	Kmet (0-1)		ASU Live Stream	2,723	2-0	-
Feb. 17	vs. Notre Dame		Phoenix Municipal Stadium • Phoenix, AZ	16–5	**Dabovich** (1-0)	Junker (0-1)		ASU Live Stream	2,554	3-0	-
Feb. 20	vs. San Diego		Phoenix Municipal Stadium • Phoenix, AZ	12–2	**Montoya** (1-0)	Dolak (0-1)		ASU Live Stream	1,624	4-0	-
Feb. 22	vs. UC Davis		Phoenix Municipal Stadium • Phoenix, AZ	**POSTPONED DUE TO WEATHER**							-
Feb. 23	vs. UC Davis		Phoenix Municipal Stadium • Phoenix, AZ	3–2	**Marsh** (2-0)	Lyford (0-1)	**Tolman** (1)	ASU Live Stream	2078	5-0	-
Feb. 23	vs. UC Davis		Phoenix Municipal Stadium • Phoenix, AZ	13–3	**Vander Kooi** (1-0)	Hannah (1-1)		ASU Live Stream	2078	6-0	-
Feb. 24	vs. UC Davis		Phoenix Municipal Stadium • Phoenix, AZ	17–2	**Dabovich** (2-0)	Brown (1-1)		ASU Live Stream	1826	7-0	-
Feb. 26	vs. Pepperdine	#24	Phoenix Municipal Stadium • Phoenix, AZ	4–3	**Corrigan** (1-0)	Stoutland (0-1)	**Burzell** (1)	ASU Live Stream	1776	8-0	-

March (17–1)

Date	Opponent	Rank	Site/stadium	Score	Win	Loss	Save	TV	Attendance	Overall Record	Pac-12 Record
Mar. 1	vs. Michigan State	#24	Phoenix Municipal Stadium • Phoenix, AZ	8–0	**Marsh** (3-0)	Erla (1-2)		ASU Live Steam	2563	9-0	-
Mar. 2	vs. Michigan State	#24	Phoenix Municipal Stadium • Phoenix, AZ	8–5	**Tolman** (1-0)	Tyranski (0-2)		ASU Live Stream	2733	10-0	-
Mar. 3	vs. Michigan State	#24	Phoenix Municipal Stadium • Phoenix, AZ	13–2	**Dabovich** (3-0)	Diaz (0-2)		ASU Live Stream	2560	11-0	-
Mar. 5	at. Cal State Fullerton	#17	Goodwin Field • Fullerton, CA	6–4	**Corrigan** (2-0)	Luckham (1-1)		ASU Live Stream	1096	12-0	-
Mar. 6	at. Cal State Fullerton	#17	Goodwin Field • Fullerton, CA	**CANCELLED DUE TO WEATHER**							-
Mar. 8	vs. Xavier	#17	Phoenix Municipal Stadium • Phoenix, AZ	12–0	**Vander Kooi** (2-0)	Zwack (1-1)		ASU Live Stream	2213	13-0	-
Mar. 9	vs. Xavier	#17	Phoenix Municipal Stadium • Phoenix, AZ	8–3	**Marsh** (4-0)	Lanoue (1-1)		ASU Live Stream	2558	14-0	-
Mar. 10	vs. Xavier	#17	Phoenix Municipal Stadium • Phoenix, AZ	11-6	**Dabovich** (3-0)	Grammes (1-3)		ASU Live Stream	2488	15-0	-
Mar. 13	vs. New Mexico State	#9	Phoenix Municipal Stadium • Phoenix, AZ	7-3	**Tolman** (2-0)	Dehn	**Montoya** (1)	ASU Live Stream	2519	16-0	-
Mar. 15	vs. Washington State Cougars	#9	Phoenix Municipal Stadium • Phoenix, AZ	6-0	**Marsh** (5-0)	White		ASU Live Stream	3489	17-0	1-0
Mar. 16	vs. Washington State Cougars	#9	Phoenix Municipal Stadium • Phoenix, AZ	8-7	**Montoya** (2-0)	Guerrero		Pac-12 Network	4079	18-0	2-0
Mar. 17	vs. Washington State Cougars	#9	Phoenix Municipal Stadium • Phoenix, AZ	6-5	**Tolman** (6-0)	Mills		Pac-12 Network	3303	19-0	3-0
Mar. 20	vs. California Baptist	#5	Phoenix Municipal Stadium • Phoenix, AZ	15-9	**Romero** (1-0)	Burica		ASU Live Stream	2851	20-0	
Mar. 22	at. Oregon	#5	PK Park • Eugene, OR	12-9	**Marsh**	Kafka		Oregon Live Stream	793	21-0	4-0
Mar. 23	at. Oregon	#5	PK Park • Eugene, OR	4-5	Tellache	**Corrigan**		Oregon Live Stream	888	21-1	4-1
Mar. 24	at. Oregon	#5	PK Park • Eugene, OR	7-3	**Romero**	Walker	**Romero**	Oregon Live Stream	1150	22-1	5-1
Mar. 29	vs. Arizona	#3	Phoenix Municipal Stadium • Phoenix, AZ	8–2	**Marsh**	Labaut	**Corrigan**	ASU Live Stream	6059	23-1	6-1
Mar. 30	vs. Arizona	#3	Phoenix Municipal Stadium • Phoenix, AZ	8–3	**Vander Kooi**	Flanagan	Romero	ASU Live Stream	5688	24-1	7-1
Mar. 31	vs. Arizona	#3	Phoenix Municipal Stadium • Phoenix, AZ	17–16	**Remero**	Weems		ASU Live Stream	4461	25-1	8-1

April (7–9)

Date	Opponent	Rank	Site/stadium	Score	Win	Loss	Save	TV	Attendance	Overall Record	Pac-12 Record
Apr. 2	vs. Long Beach State	#2	Phoenix Municipal Stadium • Phoenix, AZ	9–14	Baayoun	**Cacchione**		ASU Live Stream	2525	25-2	8-1
Apr. 5	at. USC	#2	Dedeaux Field • Los Angeles, CA	6–10	Lunn	**Marsh**		USC Live Stream	493	25-3	8-2
Apr. 6	at. USC	#2	Dedeaux Field • Los Angeles, CA	3–7	Lambert	**Vander Kooi**		USC Live Stream	579	25-4	8-3
Apr. 7	at. USC	#2	Dedeaux Field • Los Angeles, CA	11–8	**Corrigan**	Hurt	**Tolman**	USC Live Stream	611	26–4	9–3
Apr. 9	at. UNLV	#9	Earl Wilson Stadium • Paradise, NV	10–9	McCrystal	**Romero**			666	26–5	9–3
Apr. 12	vs. #5 Oregon State	#9	Phoenix Municipal Stadium • Phoenix, AZ	4–1	**Marsh**	Eisert		Pac-12 Plus Live Stream	3410	27–5	10–3
Apr. 13	vs. #5 Oregon State	#9	Phoenix Municipal Stadium • Phoenix, AZ	4–6	Chamberlain	**Corrigan**	Mulholland	Pac-12 Plus Live Stream	4080	27–6	10–4
Apr. 14	vs. #5 Oregon State	#9	Phoenix Municipal Stadium • Phoenix, AZ	3–4	Gambrell	**Romero**	Verbung	Pac-12 Plus Live Stream	3241	27–7	10–5
Apr. 16	vs. Seattle	#12	Phoenix Municipal Stadium • Phoenix, AZ	12–5	**Lidd**	Parisotto		ASU Live Stream	2002	28–7	10–5
Apr. 18	at Utah	#12	Smith's Ballpark • Salt Lake City, UT	11–6	**Burzell**	McCleve		Utah Live Stream	1546	29–7	11–5
Apr. 19	at Utah	#12	Smith's Ballpark • Salt Lake City, UT	8–5	**Vander Kooi**	Rebar		Utah Live Stream	1872	30–7	12–5
Apr. 20	at Utah	#12	Smith's Ballpark • Salt Lake City, UT	3–6	Tedeschi	**La Flam**	McCleve	Utah Live Stream	1848	30–8	12–6
Apr. 23	vs. UNLV	#10	Phoenix Municipal Stadium • Phoenix, AZ	9–2	**Burzell**	Balko		ASU Live Stream	2750	31–8	12–6
Apr. 26	at. Washington	#10	Husky Ballpark • Seattle, WA	6–10	Micheles	**Marsh**	Emanuels	Washington Live Stream	676	31–9	12–7
Apr. 27	at. Washington	#10	Husky Ballpark • Seattle, WA	9–10	Nierenberg	**Corrigan**		Washington Live Stream	1050	31–10	12–8
Apr. 28	at. Washington	#10	Husky Ballpark • Seattle, WA	11–6	**Romero**	Burgmann	**Dabovich**	Washington Live Stream	857	32–10	13–8

May (5–7)

Date	Opponent	Rank	Site/stadium	Score	Win	Loss	Save	TV	Attendance	Overall Record	Pac-12 Record
May 3	vs. #1 UCLA	#12	Phoenix Municipal Stadium • Phoenix, AZ	2–3	Garcia	**Marsh**	Powell	Pac-12 Networks	3878	32–11	13–9
May 4	vs. #1 UCLA	#12	Phoenix Municipal Stadium • Phoenix, AZ	3–18	Ralston	**Vander Kooi**		Pac-12 Networks	2753	32–12	13–10
May 5	vs. #1 UCLA	#12	Phoenix Municipal Stadium • Phoenix, AZ	8–7	**Burzell**	Powell	**Dabovich**	Pac-12 Networks	2901	33–12	14–10
May 7	at. Arizona	#17	Hi Corbett Field • Tucson, AZ	10–7	**Burzell**	Vannelle	**Dabovich**	Pac-12 Networks	3908	34–12	14–10
May 10	at. Nebraska	#17	Haymarket Park • Lincoln, NE	15–6	**Marsh**	Waldron		BTN2Go	5425	35–12	14–10
May 11	at. Nebraska	#17	Haymarket Park • Lincoln, NE	1–2	Fisher	**Vander Kooi**	Gomes	BTN2Go	5403	35–13	14–10
May 12	at. Nebraska	#17	Haymarket Park • Lincoln, NE	5–8	Eddins	**Tolman**	Schanaman	BTN2Go	5325	35–14	14–10
May 17	at. California	#19	Evans Diamond • Berkeley, CA	6–5	**Dabovich**	Reyes	**Corrigan**	Pac-12 Networks	789	36–14	15–10
May 18	at. California	#19	Evans Diamond • Berkeley, CA	2–3	Horn	**Vander Kooi**		Pac-12 Networks	1033	36–15	15–11
May 19	at. California	#19	Evans Diamond • Berkeley, CA	**CANCELLED**							-
May 23	vs. #3 Stanford	#20	Phoenix Municipal Stadium • Phoenix, AZ	6–5	**Montaya**	Little		Pac-12 Networks	2681	37–15	16–11
May 24	vs. #3 Stanford	#20	Phoenix Municipal Stadium • Phoenix, AZ	4–6	Matthiessen	**Corrigan**	Grech	Pac-12 Networks	3470	37–16	16–12
May 25	vs. #3 Stanford	#20	Phoenix Municipal Stadium • Phoenix, AZ	2–3	Palisch	**Dabovich**	Little	Pac-12 Networks	2801	37–17	16–13

Post-season
NCAA Baton Rouge Regional

Date	Opponent	Rank	Site/stadium	Score	Win	Loss	Save	Attendance	Overall Record	NCAAT Record
May 31	(3) #28 Southern Mississippi	(2) #21	Alex Box Stadium, Skip Bertman Field • Baton Rouge, LA	**L** 3–15	Shepard	**Marsh**		9918	37–18	0–1
June 1	(4) Stony Brook	(2) #21	Alex Box Stadium, Skip Bertman Field • Baton Rouge, LA	**W** 13–5	**Dabovich**	Clarke		9757	38–18	1–1
June 2	(3) #28 Southern Mississippi	(2) #21	Alex Box Stadium, Skip Bertman Field • Baton Rouge, LA	**L** 12–13	Blaylock	**Burzell**		9956	38–19	1–2

== Coaches ==
2019 Arizona State Sun Devils baseball coaching staff
- Tracy Smith - Head coach
- Mike Cather - Assistant coach/Pitching
- Ben Greenspan - Assistant coach/Recruiting
- Michael Earley - Volunteer assistant coach/Hitting

== Rankings ==
Ranking movements Legend: ██ Increase in ranking ██ Decrease in ranking — = Not ranked
	Week																		
Poll	Pre	1	2	3	4	5	6	7	8	9	10	11	12	13	14	15	16	17	Final
Coaches'	—	—*		23	19	10	9	5	9	12	11	16	20	25	—	—			
Baseball America	—	—	—	—	—	20	14	10	13	14	13	20	24	—	—	—			
Collegiate Baseball^	36	—	24	17	9	5	3	2	9	12	10	12	17	19	20	21	29		
NCBWA†	—	—	26	23	20	12	9	6	14	15	13	18	22	26	28	27			
D1Baseball	—	—	—	—	25	15	9	7	13	16	15	22	—	—	—	—			

^ Collegiate Baseball ranked 40 teams in their preseason poll, but only ranked 30 teams weekly during the season.
† NCBWA ranks 30 teams in their preseason poll, but only ranks 25 teams weekly during the season.
* A new poll was not released for this week, so for comparison purposes, the previous week's ranking is inserted in this week's slot.

== 2019 MLB draft ==
Player	Position	Round	Overall	MLB team
Hunter Bishop	OF	1	10	San Francisco Giants
Alec Marsh	RHP	2	70	Kansas City Royals
Lyle Lin	C	14	422	Arizona Diamondbacks
Carter Aldrete	2B	15	446	San Francisco Giants
Sam Romero	RHP	40	1,214	Oakland Athletics
