= 2019 Stanford Cardinal baseball team =

American college baseball season

2019 Stanford Cardinal baseball

Stanford Regional champions

NCAA tournament, Super Regional
- Conference: Pac-12 Conference

Ranking
- Coaches: No. 10
- CB: No. 10
- Record: 45–14 (20–6 Pac-12)
- Head coach: David Esquer (2nd season)
- Assistant coaches: Thomas Eager (2nd season); Tommy Nicholson (2nd season); Jack Marder (2nd season)
- Home stadium: Klein Field at Sunken Diamond

2019 Pac-12 Conference baseball standings
	Conf.						Overall
Team	W		L		T	PCT	W		L		T	PCT
No. 7 UCLA ‍†‍‍^{y}	24	–	5	–	0	.828	52	–	11	–	0	.825
No. 10 Stanford ‍‍‍^{y}	22	–	7	–	0	.759	45	–	14	–	0	.763
Oregon State ‍‍‍^{y}	21	–	8	–	0	.724	36	–	20	–	1	.640
California ‍‍‍^{y}	17	–	11	–	0	.607	32	–	20	–	0	.615
Arizona State ‍‍‍^{y}	16	–	13	–	0	.552	38	–	19	–	0	.667
Arizona ‍‍‍	15	–	14	–	0	.517	32	–	24	–	0	.571
USC ‍‍‍	13	–	15	–	1	.466	25	–	29	–	1	.464
Washington ‍‍‍	12	–	17	–	0	.414	28	–	24	–	0	.538
Oregon ‍‍‍	10	–	19	–	0	.345	27	–	29	–	0	.482
Utah ‍‍‍	6	–	24	–	0	.200	16	–	33	–	0	.327
Washington State ‍‍‍	3	–	25	–	1	.121	11	–	41	–	1	.217
† – Conference champion y – Invited to the NCAA tournament As of July 16, 2019; Rankings from D1Baseball

The 2019 Stanford Cardinal baseball team represented Stanford University in the 2019 NCAA Division I baseball season. The Cardinal play their home games at Klein Field at Sunken Diamond under second year coach David Esquer.

== Previous season ==
The Cardinal finished 46-12 overall with a 22-8 conference record. They started the 2018 season 10-0 with sweeps over Cal-State Fullerton and Rice and then finishing the regular season winning the Pac-12 conference and the automatic bid to the NCAA tournament.

Ranked 1 in the Cal State Fullerton Super Regional, the Cardinal beat Wright State and Baylor, but would lose to Cal State Fullerton twice, throughout the Super Regional, losing the Regional.

=== 2018 MLB draft ===
The Cardinal had five individuals selected in the 2018 MLB draft.

Player	Position	Round	Overall	MLB Team
Nico Hoerner	Shortstop	1	24	Chicago Cubs
Kris Bubic	Pitcher	1	40	Kansas City Royals
Tristan Beck	Pitcher	4	112	Atlanta Braves
Beau Branton	Second base	28	838	Seattle Mariners
Duke Kinamon*	Second base	34	1010	New York Mets

- Duke Kinamon did not sign with the New York Mets.

== Roster ==
2019 Stanford Cardinal roster
Pitchers: 18 Cody Jensen – Freshman; 20 Brendan Beck – Sophomore; 26 Erik Miller – Junior; 27 Carson Rudd – Sophomore; 28 Alex Williams – Freshman; 30 Zach Grech – Junior; 33 Jack Little - Junior; 34 Luke Sleeper – RS-Sophomore; 36 Jonathan Worley – Junior; 38 Ben Baggett – RS-Sophomore; 39 Jacob Palisch – Sophomore; 40 Nicolas Lopez – Freshman; 42 Austin Weiermiller – Sophomore; 49 Michael Boden – Senior	Catchers: 10 Maverick Handley - Junior; 16 Vincent Martinez - Freshman; Infielders: 5 Austin Kretzschmar – Freshman; 6 Zach Sehgal – Sophomore; 12 Duke Kinamon – Senior; 13 Justin Moore – Freshman; 24 Nick Brueser - (redshirt) Freshman; 31 Nick Bellafronto – RS-Junior	Outfielders: 11 Alec Wilson – Senior; 15 Grant Burton – Freshman; 21 Tim Tawa – Sophomore; 23 Nickolas Oar – RS-Junior; 29 Brandon Wulff – Senior; 44 Christian Robinson - Sophomore; Utility: 2 Christian Molfetta (INF/P/C) – RS-Junior; 3 Daniel Bakst (INF/P) - (redshirt) Sophomore; 7 Brandon Dieter (INF/P) – Freshman; 19 Will Matthiessen (P/DH) – Junior; 25 Andrew Daschbach (INF/OF) – Junior; 37 Kyle Stowers (OF/P) – Junior; Source:

== Schedule and results ==
Legend
	Stanford win
	Stanford loss
	Postponement
**Bold**	Stanford team member

2019 Stanford Cardinal baseball game log
Regular season (41–11)

February (7–1)
Date	Opponent	Rank	Site/stadium	Score	Win	Loss	Save	TV	Attendance	Overall record	Pac-12 Record
Feb. 15	vs. Ball State	No. 12	Tempe Diablo Stadium • Tempe, AZ	2-1	**Grech** (1-0)	Jameson (0-1)	**Little** (1)		217	1-0	-
Feb. 16	vs. Wichita State	No. 12	Tempe Diablo Stadium • Tempe, AZ	5-4	**Jensen** (1-0)	Eddy (0-1)	**Little (2)**		182	2-0	-
Feb. 17	vs. Pepperdine	No. 12	Tempe Diablo Stadium • Tempe, AZ	6-1	**Matthiessen** (1-0)	Salazar (0-1)			253	3-0	-
Feb. 18	at Grand Canyon	No. 12	Brazell Field at GCU Ballpark • Phoenix, AZ	14-4	**Williams** (1-0)	Hull (0-1)		YouTube	1,643	4-0	-
Feb. 22	UNLV	No. 12	Klein Field at Sunken Diamond • Stanford, CA	1-2	Jabara (1-0)	**Beck** (0-1)	Cofer (3)	Stanford Live Stream	1,323	4-1	-
Feb. 23	UNLV	No. 12	Klein Field at Sunken Diamond • Stanford, CA	3-2	**Little** (1-0)	Woods (0-1)		Stanford Live Stream	1,121	5-1	-
Feb. 24	UNLV	No. 12	Klein Field at Sunken Diamond • Stanford, CA	6-5	**Miller** (1-0)	Hare (1-1)		Stanford Live Stream	1,251	6-1	-
Feb. 27	San Francisco	No. 11	Klein Field at Sunken Diamond • Stanford, CA	8-3	**Weiermiller** (1-0)	Steele (0-1)		Pac-12+ Live Stream	650	7-1	

March (11–2)
Date	Opponent	Rank	Site/stadium	Score	Win	Loss	Save	TV	Attendance	Overall record	Pac-12 Record
Mar. 1	at No. 24 Cal State Fullerton	No. 11	Goodwin Field • Fullerton, CA	4-3	**Grech** (2-0)	Bibee (2-1)	**Little** (3)			8-1	
Mar. 1	at No. 24 Cal State Fullerton	No. 11	Goodwin Field • Fullerton, CA	8-1	**Palisch** (1-0)	Josten (0-3)			2,211	9-1	
Mar. 3	at No. 24 Cal State Fullerton	No. 11	Goodwin Field • Fullerton, CA	5-6	Weisberg (1-0)	**Little** (1-1)			1,541	9-2	
Mar. 7	No. 20 Texas	No. 8	Klein Field at Sunken Diamond • Stanford, CA	0-4	Fields (1-0)	**Beck** (0-2)		Stanford Live Stream	907	9-3	
Mar. 8	No. 20 Texas	No. 8	Klein Field at Sunken Diamond • Stanford, CA	8-1	**Palisch** (2-0)	Elder (2-1)		Stanford Live Stream	1,855	10-3	
Mar. 9	No. 20 Texas	No. 8	Klein Field at Sunken Diamond • Stanford, CA	4-2	**Little** (2-1)	Bryant (2-1)		Stanford Live Stream	1,315	11-3	
Mar. 10	No. 20 Texas	No. 8	Klein Field at Sunken Diamond • Stanford, CA	9-0	**Miller** (2-0)	Cobb (0-2)		Stanford Live Stream	1,162	12-3	
Mar. 22	Utah	No. 3	Klein Field at Sunken Diamond • Stanford, CA	7-4	**Beck** (1-2)	Robeniol (1-2)	**Little** (4)	Stanford Live Stream	746	13-3	1-0
Mar. 23	Utah	No. 3	Klein Field at Sunken Diamond • Stanford, CA	7-6	**Little** (3-1)	Brocoff (0-3)		Stanford Live Stream	1,160	14-3	2-0
Mar. 24	Utah	No. 3	Klein Field at Sunken Diamond • Stanford, CA	7-3	**Weiermiller** (2-0)	Tedeschi (3-2)	**Matthiessen** (1)	Stanford Live Stream	1,681	15-3	3-0
Mar. 29	at Washington State	No. 3	Bailey-Brayton Field • Pullman, WA	7-1	**Weiermiller** (3-0)	White (2-3)	**Jensen** (1)	WSU Live Stream	1,132	16-3	4-0
Mar. 30	at Washington State	No. 2	Bailey-Brayton Field • Pullman, WA	8-5	**Williams** (2-0)	Baillie (1-2)	**Little** (5)	WSU Live Stream	1,313	17-3	5-0
Mar. 31	at Washington State	No. 2	Bailey-Brayton Field • Pullman, WA	14-2	**Miller** (3-0)	Rosenfrantz (2-2)		WSU Live Stream	751	18-3	6-0

April (14–4)
Date	Opponent	Rank	Site/stadium	Score	Win	Loss	Save	TV	Attendance	Overall record	Pac-12 Record
Apr. 2	Fresno State	No. 2	Klein Field at Sunken Diamond • Stanford, CA	2-0	**Weiermiller** (4-0)	Pruhsmeier (1-1)	**Little** (6)	Stanford Live Stream	456	19-3	-
Apr. 5	No. 1 UCLA	No. 2	Klein Field at Sunken Diamond • Stanford, CA	3-2	**Weiermiller** (5-0)	Mora (2-2)		Stanford Live Stream	1,860	20-3	7-0
Apr. 6	No. 1 UCLA	No. 2	Klein Field at Sunken Diamond • Stanford, CA	5-11	Ralston	**Palisch** (2-1)		Stanford Live Stream	2,316	20-4	7-1
Apr. 7	No. 1 UCLA	No. 2	Klein Field at Sunken Diamond • Stanford, CA	7-10	Garcia (3-0)	**Matthiessen** (1-1)		Stanford Live Stream	2,793	20-5	7-2
Apr. 9	at San Francisco	No. 5	Dante Benedetti Diamond at Max Ulrich Field • San Francisco, CA	11-1	**Williams** (3-0)	Mollerus (0-2)			218	21-5	-
Apr. 12	Washington	No. 5	Klein Field at Sunken Diamond • Stanford, CA	8-2	**Beck** (2-2)	Rhodes (4-4)		Pac-12	1,137	22-5	8-2
Apr. 13	Washington	No. 5	Klein Field at Sunken Diamond • Stanford, CA	3-2	**Matthiessen** (2-1)	Jones (2-4)	**Little** (7)	Pac-12	1,317	23-5	9-2
Apr. 14	Washington	No. 5	Klein Field at Sunken Diamond • Stanford, CA	6-1	**Miller** (4-0)	Burgmann (3-2)	**Weiermiller** (1)	Pac-12	1,509	24-5	10-2
Apr. 16	UC Davis	No. 4	Klein Field at Sunken Diamond • Stanford, CA	6-8	Hannah (3-3)	**Williams** (3-1)	Ouellette (2)	Stanford Live Stream	787	24-6	
Apr. 18	at Oregon	No. 4	PK Park • Eugene, OR	5-4	**Beck** (3-2)	Kafka (4-3)	**Little** (8)	Pac-12	1,208	25-6	11-2
Apr. 19	at Oregon	No. 4	PK Park • Eugene, OR	20-5	**Matthiessen** (3-1)	Stringer (1-1)		Pac-12	1,366	26-6	12-2
Apr. 20	at Oregon	No. 4	PK Park • Eugene, OR	10-0	**Miller** (5-0)	Frazier (0-2)		Oregon Live Stream	1,663	27-6	13-2
Apr. 22	Gonzaga	No. 3	Klein Field at Sunken Diamond • Stanford, CA	11-10	**Lopez** (1-0)	Trogrlic-Iverson (1-2)		Stanford Live Stream	763	28-6	
Apr. 23	San Jose State	No. 3	Klein Field at Sunken Diamond • Stanford, CA	15-7	**Williams** (4-1)	Polack (1-4)		Stanford Live Stream	906	29-6	
Apr. 26	Arizona	No. 3	Klein Field at Sunken Diamond • Stanford, CA	3-6	Labaut (3-2)	**Beck** (3-3)	Flanagan (1)	Stanford Live Stream	1,383	29-7	13-3
Apr. 27	Arizona	No. 3	Klein Field at Sunken Diamond • Stanford, CA	13-3	**Matthiessen** (4-1)	Nardi (3-5)		Stanford Live Stream	2,434	30-7	14-3
Apr. 28	Arizona	No. 3	Klein Field at Sunken Diamond • Stanford, CA	13-5	**Miller** (6-0)	Weems (3-5)		Stanford Live Stream	1,822	31-7	15-3
Apr. 30	at Santa Clara	No. 2	Stephen Schott Stadium • Santa Clara, CA	7-1	**Williams** (5-1)	Buckley (1-1)		500	32-7		

May (9–4)
Date	Opponent	Rank	Site/stadium	Score	Win	Loss	Save	TV	Attendance	Overall record	Pac-12 Record
May 3	at USC	No. 2	Dedeaux Field • Los Angeles, CA	8-3	**Beck** (4-3)	Lunn (6-2)		Pac-12	504	33-7	16-3
May 4	at USC	No. 2	Dedeaux Field • Los Angeles, CA	7-4	**Matthiessen** (5-1)	Esqueda (3-4)	**Weiermiller** (2)	Pac-12	896	34-7	17-3
May 5	at USC	No. 2	Dedeaux Field • Los Angeles, CA	2-4	Hurt (1-6)	**Miller** (6-1)	Clarke (6)	Pac-12	875	34-8	17-4
May 7	Santa Clara	No. 2	Klein Field at Sunken Diamond • Stanford, CA	5-1	**Williams** (6-1)	Waldsmith (0-1)		Stanford Live Stream	926	35-8	
May 10	at California	No. 2	Evans Diamond • Berkeley, CA	10-7	**Weiermiller** (6-0)	Reyes (4-2)		Pac-12	1,245	36-8	18-4
May 11	at California	No. 2	Evans Diamond • Berkeley, CA	2-18	Horn (5-1)	**Matthiessen** (5-2)		Pac-12	1,730	36-9	18-5
May 12	at California	No. 2	Evans Diamond • Berkeley, CA	5-2	**Miller** (7-1)	Stoutenborough (7-4)		Pac-12	1,031	37-9	19-5
May 14	Cal Poly	No. 3	Klein Field at Sunken Diamond • Stanford, CA	7-1	**Williams** (7-1)	Zill (2-6)		Stanford Live Stream	887	38-9	
May 17	#11 Oregon State	No. 3	Klein Field at Sunken Diamond • Stanford, CA	8-5	**Palisch** (3-1)	Fehmel (7-2)	**Little** (9)	Pac-12	1,990	39-9	20-5
May 18	#11 Oregon State	No. 3	Klein Field at Sunken Diamond • Stanford, CA		**CANCELLED DUE TO WEATHER**						
May 19	#11 Oregon State	No. 3	Klein Field at Sunken Diamond • Stanford, CA	2-5	Gambrell (5-1)	**Miller** (7-2)	Muholland (8)	Pac-12	2,000	39-10	20-6
May 21	Pacific	No. 4	Klein Field at Sunken Diamond • Stanford, CA		**CANCELLED DUE TO WEATHER**						
May 23	at Arizona State	No. 4	Phoenix Municipal Stadium • Phoenix, AZ	5-6	Montoya (3-0)	**Little** (3-2)		Pac-12	2,681	39-11	20-7
May 24	at Arizona State	No. 4	Phoenix Municipal Stadium • Phoenix, AZ	6-4	**Matthiessen** (6-2)	Corrigan (3-4)	**Grech** (1)	Pac-12	3,470	40-11	21-7
May 25	at Arizona State	No. 4	Phoenix Municipal Stadium • Phoenix, AZ	3-2	**Palisch** (1-0)	Dabovich (6-1)	**Little** (10)	Pac-12	2,801	41-11	22-7

Postseason (4-3)

Stanford Regional (4-1)
Date	Opponent	Rank	Site/stadium	Score	Win	Loss	Save	TV	Attendance	Overall record	Regional Record
May 31	(4) Sacramento State	No. 4 (1)	Klein Field at Sunken Diamond • Stanford, CA	11-0	**Beck** (5-3)	Randall (8-2)			2,021	42-11	1-0
June 1	(3) Fresno State	No. 4 (1)	Klein Field at Sunken Diamond • Stanford, CA	2-7	Moore (10-1)	**Palisch** (4-2)		ESPN3	2,729	42-12	1-1
June 2	(4) Sacramento State	No. 4 (1)	Klein Field at Sunken Diamond • Stanford, CA	12-3	**Williams** (8-1)	Gibbons (1-3)		ESPN3		43-12	2-1
June 2	(3) Fresno State	No. 4 (1)	Klein Field at Sunken Diamond • Stanford, CA	8-6	**Miller** (8-2)	Hill (2-2)	**Little** (11)	ESPN3	1,912	44-12	3-1
June 3	(3) Fresno State	No. 4 (1)	Klein Field at Sunken Diamond • Stanford, CA	9-7	**Palisch** (5-2)	Larson (2-1)	**Little** (12)	ESPNU	2,406	45-12	4-1

Starkville Super Regional (0-2)
Date	Opponent	Rank	Site/stadium	Score	Win	Loss	Save	TV	Attendance	Overall record	Regional Record
June 8	(1) #3 Mississippi State	No. 4 (1)	Dudy Noble Field • Starkville, MS	2-6	Small (10–2)	**Beck** (5-4)		ESPNNEWS	13,132	45-13	0-1
June 9	(1) #3 Mississippi State	No. 4 (1)	Dudy Noble Field • Starkville, MS	1-8	Plumlee (7-4)	**Miller** (8-3)		ESPNU	11,597	45-14	0-2

- Rankings based on team's current ranking in the D1Baseball poll.

== Stanford Regional ==
Stanford Regional Teams
(1) Stanford Cardinal	(2) UC Santa Barbara Gauchos	(3) Fresno State Bulldogs	(4) Sacramento State Hornets

First Round
1	Stanford	11
4	Sacramento State	0
3	Fresno State	9
2	UC Santa Barbara	2
Lower round 1
4	Sacramento State	6
2	UC Santa Barbara	4

Semi-Finals
1	Stanford	2
3	Fresno State	7
Lower final
1	Stanford	12
4	Sacramento State	3

Finals
3	Fresno State
1	Stanford

== Statistics ==
=== Batting ===
Note: G = Games played; AB = At bats; R = Runs scored; H = Hits; 2B = Doubles; 3B = Triples; HR = Home runs; RBI = Runs batted in; BB = Base on balls; SO = Strikeouts; AVG = Batting average; SB = Stolen bases

Player	G	AB	R	H	2B	3B	HR	RBI	BB	SO	AVG	SB
Will Matthiessen, DH/P	59	216	46	67	12	0	12	52	28	56	.310	1
Kyle Stowers, OF/P	55	218	39	66	19	1	9	39	24	31	.303	13
Duke Kinamon, INF	50	185	39	56	12	0	6	32	8	33	.303	12
Maverick Hundley, C	59	224	45	65	13	3	5	24	33	39	.290	12
Andrew Daschbach, INF/OF	59	211	55	61	11	2	17	46	25	54	.289	1
Christian Robinson, OF	49	108	16	31	9	0	0	15	15	24	.287	8
Brandon Wulff, OF	59	206	54	56	7	1	19	42	41	68	.272	6
Nick Bellafronto, INF	47	132	32	34	13	0	6	32	28	41	.258	1
Tim Tawa, OF	58	217	35	55	10	0	8	37	9	51	.253	6
Austin Kretzschmar, INF	14	12	3	6	0	1	0	1	1	2	.500	0
Nickolas, Oar, OF	15	17	3	5	0	0	1	2	1	7	.294	0
Vincent Martinez, C	7	8	0	2	0	0	0	0	0	2	.250	0
Nick Brueser, INF	37	85	11	19	6	0	2	16	18	25	.224	2
Brandon Dieter, INF/P	32	72	7	15	2	0	1	12	6	17	.208	0
Alec Wilson, OF	37	51	8	9	4	0	1	7	6	12	.176	1
Christian Molfetta, OF/INF	10	12	2	2	0	0	1	1	1	3	.167	0
Grant Burton, OF	5	2	1	0	0	0	0	1	1	3	.000	0
Zach Sehgal, INF	2	1	0	0	0	0	0	0	0	0	.000	0

=== Pitching ===
Note: W = Wins; L = Losses; ERA = Earned run average; G = Games pitched; GS = Games started; SV = Saves; IP = Innings pitched; H = Hits allowed; R = Runs allowed; ER = Earned runs allowed; HR = Home runs allowed; BB = Walks allowed; K = Strikeouts

Player	W	L	ERA	G	GS	SV	IP	H	R	ER	HR	BB	K
Brandon Dieter	0	0	0.00	1	0	0	1.1	0	0	0	0	0	1
Austin Weiermiller	6	0	2.45	25	0	2	33.0	25	11	9	1	17	41
Alex Williams	8	1	2.56	14	10	0	63.1	53	23	18	3	8	43
Carson Rudd	0	0	2.95	15	0	0	21.1	17	8	7	0	11	14
Jack Little	3	2	3.37	25	0	12	42.2	35	17	16	4	11	55
Erik Miller	8	3	3.48	16	16	0	82.2	68	38	32	6	46	102
Cody Jensen	1	0	3.55	20	2	1	33.0	28	14	13	3	11	32
Brendan Beck	5	4	3.63	17	16	0	91.2	102	41	37	6	25	83
Zach Grech	2	0	3.68	32	0	1	44.0	47	20	18	4	7	28
Will Matthiessen	6	2	3.83	16	8	1	54.0	48	23	23	6	19	56
Jacob Palisch	5	2	4.79	26	7	0	56.1	67	33	30	4	21	48
Nicolas Lopez	1	0	15.00	1	0	0	3.0	4	5	5	1	3	4
Ben Baggett	0	0	36.00	2	0	0	1.0	2	4	4	2	3	0

== Rankings ==
Ranking movements Legend: ██ Increase in ranking ██ Decrease in ranking ( ) = First-place votes
	Week																		
Poll	Pre	1	2	3	4	5	6	7	8	9	10	11	12	13	14	15	16	17	Final
Coaches'	12	12*	12	5	4 (1)	3 (1)	3 (1)	2 (3)	5	3	3	3	3	3	4	3	3	10	10
Baseball America	7	7	7	4	3	3	3	2	2	2	2	2	3	3	3	3	3	10	10
Collegiate Baseball^	5	5	8	11	8	8	6	4	3	2	2	3	4	3	3	3	3	10	10
NCBWA†	8	8	10	5	3	3	2	2	2	4	2	2	3	3	3	3	3	10	10
D1Baseball	12	12	11	6	4	3	3	2	5	4	3	2	2	3	4	4	3	10	10

^ Collegiate Baseball ranked 40 teams in their preseason poll, but only ranked 30 teams weekly during the season.
† NCBWA ranks 30 teams in their preseason poll, but only ranks 25 teams weekly during the season.
* A new poll was not released for this week, so for comparison purposes, the previous week's ranking is inserted in this week's slot.
