= Mission League =

High school athletic league in California

The Mission League is a high school athletic league that is part of the CIF Southern Section.

== Member schools ==
- Bishop Alemany High School (Mission Hills)
- Chaminade College Preparatory (West Hills)
- Crespi Carmelite High School (Encino)
- Harvard-Westlake School (Studio City)
- Loyola High School (Los Angeles)
- Notre Dame High School (Sherman Oaks)
- Sierra Canyon School (Chatsworth)
- St. Francis High School (La Cañada)
- Louisville High School (Woodland Hills) (Girls' Sports Only)

=== Football membership as of 2024 ===
- Bishop Amat Memorial High School (La Puente)
- Chaminade College Preparatory (West Hills)
- Junipero Serra High School (Gardena)
- Loyola High School (Los Angeles)
- Notre Dame High School (Sherman Oaks)
