= Saint Francis High School (La Cañada Flintridge, California) =

St. Francis High School

Location
- 200 North Foothill Boulevard; La Cañada Flintridge 91011; United States

Information
- School type: Private
- Motto: A Catholic Tradition of Enriching the Mind and Heart Since 1946.
- Religious affiliations: Catholic; Order of Friars Minor Capuchin
- Denomination: Catholic
- Patron saint: Francis of Assisi
- Established: 1946
- Founder: Fr. Stephen Murtaugh OFM Cap.
- Sister school: Flintridge Sacred Heart Academy
- President: Andy Burghdorf
- Principal: Tracy Traver
- Chaplain: Christopher Iwancio
- Teaching staff: 37.1 (on a full-time equivalent basis)
- Grades: 9-12
- Gender: Boys
- Enrollment: 605 (2023-2024)
- Average class size: 31
- Student to teacher ratio: 18.2
- Colors: Brown and gold
- Athletics: Baseball, basketball, cross country, football, golf, lacrosse, soccer, swimming, tennis, track and field, volleyball, water polo
- Athletics conference: CIF Southern Section; Mission League
- Mascot: Knight
- Nickname: Golden Knights
- Rival: Loyola High School (Los Angeles)
- Accreditation: Western Association of Schools and Colleges
- Newspaper: KnightLife
- Yearbook: Alvernian
- Annual tuition: $23,000 (2024-2025)
- Website: www.sfhs.net

St. Francis High School is a Catholic college preparatory high school for boys, located in La Cañada Flintridge, California, USA. Founded in 1946 by the Capuchin Franciscans, St. Francis High School serves grades 9-12.

== Academics ==
St. Francis is fully accredited by Western Association of Schools and Colleges and the Western Catholic Educational Association. It is operated by a board of directors under the sponsorship of the Capuchin Franciscans' Western America Province. In 2012, St. Francis placed first in California and second nationally in the Academic Decathlon.

== Demographics ==
The demographic breakdown for the 675 boys enrolled in 2013-2014 was:

- Native American/Alaskan - 0.4%
- Asian/Pacific islander - 9.2%
- Black - 9%
- Hispanic - 23.3%
- White - 50.8%
- Multiracial - 14.2%

== Athletics ==
The St. Francis Golden Knights compete in the Mission League, part of the CIF Southern Section. The school colors are brown and gold. The following varsity sports are offered:

- Basketball
- Baseball
- Cross country
- Football
- Golf
- Lacrosse
- Soccer
- Swimming
- Tennis
- Track
- Volleyball
- Water polo

1982- CIF Champions CFU 2020 - Basketball Southern California State Champions (Coach: Todd Wolfson) 2021 - CIF Champions Lacrosse (Coach: Don Bowers)

== Notable alumni ==
- Christian Bergman, MLB pitcher
- Greg Dulcich, NFL football player
- Matthew Elshoff, auxiliary bishop of the Archdiocese of Los Angeles
- Jason Hirsh, MLB pitcher
- Mark Loretta, MLB second baseman
- Lloyd Monserratt, California political & community leader
- Mike Newlin, NBA player
- Tony O'Dell, actor
- Daniel Paladini (2003), Major League Soccer midfielder
- Daniel Scott, NFL safety for the Indianapolis Colts
- Peter Vagenas, soccer player
- Carl Verheyen, musician
- Mike Vitar, actor
- Matt Young, baseball player
- Gregg Zaun, MLB catcher

== Notable faculty ==
- Michael Tucci, actor-turned-theatre coach
