= Pat Bailey =

American baseball player and coach (born 1956)

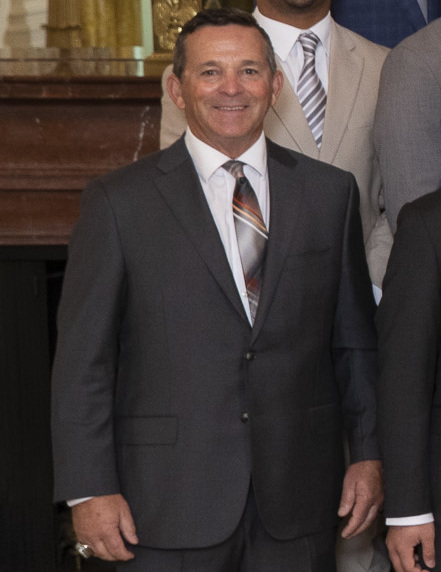
- Bailey at the White House in 2019

Biographical details
- Born: January 18, 1956 (age 70); Moscow, Idaho, U.S.
- Education: University of Idaho

Playing career
- 1975–76: North Idaho College
- 1977–78: Idaho
- Position: Outfielder

Coaching career (HC unless noted)
- 1985–91: West Linn (OR)
- 1992: Portland (asst)
- 1993–95: West Linn (OR)
- 1996–2007: George Fox
- 2008–18: Oregon State (asst)
- 2019: Oregon State (interim)
- 2020: Oregon State (asst)

Head coaching record
- Overall: 398–165–1 (.707)

Accomplishments and honors

Championships
- College World Series champion (2018)

Patrick Bailey (born January 18, 1956) is an American former college baseball coach. He served as the head coach of the NCAA Division III George Fox Bruins (1996–2007). He was then the interim coach of the Oregon State Beavers (2019), and its assistant coach the following year. In 2020 it was announced that Bailey would not be returning to the Beavers' coaching staff in 2021.

== Playing career ==
He played outfield in college baseball at North Idaho College, a community college, from 1975 to 1976, before transferring to Idaho where he played baseball from 1977 to 1978.

== Coaching career ==
On September 6, 2018, Pat Casey announced his retirement from Oregon State, and Bailey was named the interim head coach. Bailey was replaced by Mitch Canham after going 36–20–1 in his interim season, but Bailey remained with the team as an assistant coach for the 2020 season. On July 31, 2020, it was announced that Bailey would not be returning to the Beavers' coaching staff in 2021.

== Head coaching record ==
Record table
Season	Team	Overall	Conference	Standing	Postseason
George Fox Bruins (Northwest Conference) (1996–2007)
1996	George Fox	25–16			
1997	George Fox	29–14		1st	NAIA Regional
1998	George Fox	25–13			NAIA Regional
1999	George Fox	38–8		1st	
2000	George Fox	31–8	18–6	1st	
2001	George Fox	31–10	15–9	T-3rd	
2002	George Fox	27–15	16–7	1st	
2003	George Fox	31–13	18–5	1st	
2004	George Fox	40–10	20–4	T-1st	National Champion
2005	George Fox	32–12	20–4	T-1st	
2006	George Fox	29–15			
2007	George Fox	30–11	19–5	2nd	
George Fox:		362–145 (.714)			
Oregon State Beavers (Pac-12 Conference) (2019)
2019	Oregon State	36–20–1	21–8	3rd	NCAA Regional
Oregon State:		36–20–1 (.640)	21–8 (.724)		
Total:		398–165–1 (.707)			
National champion Postseason invitational champion Conference regular season champion Conference regular season and conference tournament champion Division regular season champion Division regular season and conference tournament champion Conference tournament champion
