= La Salle College Preparatory =

Private school in Pasadena, Los Angeles County, California, United States

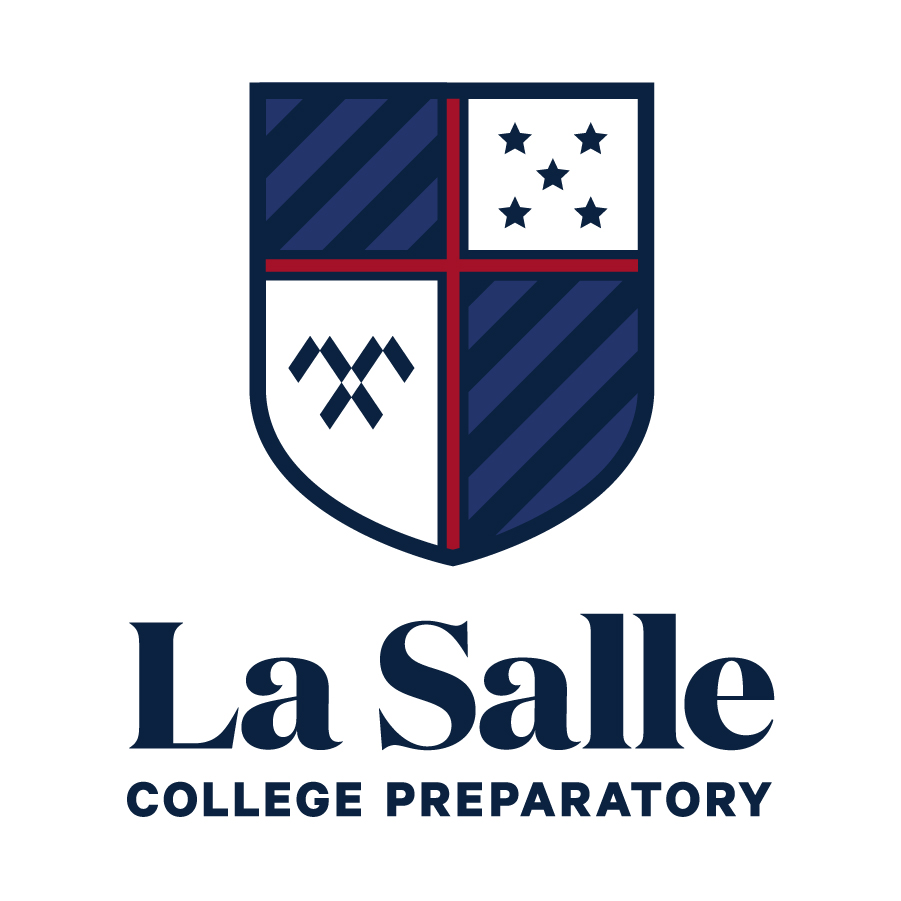

Location
- 3880 East Sierra Madre Boulevard; Pasadena, Los Angeles County, California 91107; United States; 34°9′41″N 118°4′6″W

Information
- Type: Private college-preparatory school
- Motto: Indivisa Manent (We Stand Undivided)
- Religious affiliations: Roman Catholic; Christian Brothers
- Patron saint: Saint John Baptist de La Salle
- Established: 1956; 70 years ago
- President: Perry K. Martin
- Principal: Ernest Siy
- Teaching staff: 40.6 (on an FTE basis) (2021–22)
- Grades: 9–12
- Gender: Coeducational
- Enrollment: 611 (2021–22)
- Student to teacher ratio: 15.0 (2021–22)
- Color: Blue - Red - Gold
- Athletics conference: CIF Southern Section; Del Rey League; Camino Real League
Sports
Basketball Baseball Softball; Cheer; Football Volleyball Soccer	Cross-country Dance; Golf; Swimming; Tennis; Track and field Water polo
- Mascot: Lancer
- Rival: Maranatha High School
- Accreditation: Western Association of Schools and Colleges
- Website: lasallehs.org

La Salle College Preparatory is a private, Catholic college preparatory high school founded and run by the Institute of the Brothers of the Christian Schools in Pasadena, California and located in the Roman Catholic Archdiocese of Los Angeles. It was founded in 1956 as La Salle High School. It was accredited in 1961 by the University of California.

== History ==
La Salle College Preparatory was founded in 1956 as La Salle High School. It was originally an all boys' school but became coeducational in 1993.

== Notable alumni ==
- Ryan Garcia (2016) – professional baseball player
- Phil Hendrie (1970) – radio personality, actor, and voiceover artist attended in the early 1970s.
- Gerry Janeski (1964) - former MLB player
- Bill Quirk (1963) – politician representing California's 20th State Assembly district
- Chase Rettig – starting American football quarterback for Boston College and NFL quarterback (2010–2013)
- James Roosevelt, Jr. (1963) – lawyer and grandson of President Franklin D. Roosevelt.
