= Ryan Garcia (baseball) =

American baseball player (born 1998)

Kansas City Monarchs – No. 4
- Pitcher
- Born: January 24, 1998 (age 28); Arcadia, California, U.S.
- Bats: Right Throws: Right

Ryan Miguel Garcia (born January 24, 1998) is an American professional baseball pitcher for the Kansas City Monarchs of the American Association of Professional Baseball.

== Amateur career ==
Garcia attended La Salle High School in Pasadena, California. As a senior in 2016, Garcia posted a 1.16 ERA with 48 strikeouts over 42 1/3 innings. Undrafted out of high school, he attended the University of California, Los Angeles where he played college baseball for the UCLA Bruins. As a freshman in 2017, he posted a 2–0 record with a 6.57 ERA over 12 1/3 innings. That summer he played for the Waterloo Bucks in the Northwoods League, going 3–2 with a 1.88 ERA with 52 strikeouts over 48 innings. As a sophomore in 2018, Garcia excelled to an 8–1 record with a 2.23 ERA and 76 strikeouts over 76 2/3 innings. He followed up that summer by playing in the Cape Cod League for the Wareham Gatemen, where he went 2–0 with a 1.29 ERA with 33 strikeouts over 28 innings. Garcia's best season came as a junior in 2019. He posted a 10–1 record with a 1.44 ERA and 117 strikeouts over 94 innings. He was named the 2019 Pac-12 Conference Baseball Pitcher of the Year and was named a First Team All-American.

== Professional career ==
=== Texas Rangers ===
Garcia was drafted by the Texas Rangers in the second round (50th overall) of the 2019 Major League Baseball draft. He signed with them for a $1,469,900 signing bonus. Garcia split his first professional season between the AZL Rangers of the Rookie-level Arizona League and the Spokane Indians of the Low-A Northwest League, posting a 3.60 ERA in five innings over three games. He did not play in 2020 due to the cancellation of the minor league season because of the COVID-19 pandemic.

Garcia suffered a torn ulnar collateral ligament which required Tommy John surgery in March 2020. The surgery and his rehab caused him to miss the 2021 season. Garcia returned to game action in 2022 with the Down East Wood Ducks of the Low-A Carolina League and the Hickory Crawdads of the High-A South Atlantic League, posting a combined 2–2 record with a 1.91 ERA and 74 strikeouts over 56 2/3 innings. Garcia spent the 2023 season with the Frisco RoughRiders of the Double-A Texas League, struggling to a 3–9 record with a 6.66 ERA with 110 strikeouts over 98 2/3 innings.

In 2024, Garcia made 24 starts for Frisco and the Triple-A Round Rock Express, posting a combined 10-7 record and 3.77 ERA with 126 strikeouts over 124 innings of work. He returned to Round Rock for the 2025 season, but struggled to a 2-4 record and 7.64 ERA with 57 strikeouts across 27 appearances (six starts). Garcia elected free agency following the season on November 6, 2025.

=== Piratas de Campeche ===
On April 14, 2026, Garcia signed with the Piratas de Campeche of the Mexican League. In three starts, he struggled to a 10.64 ERA, striking out six batters and walking seven across 11 innings pitched. On May 3, Garcia was released by Campeche.

=== Kansas City Monarchs ===
On May 13, 2026, Garcia signed with the Kansas City Monarchs of the American Association of Professional Baseball.
