= Phoenix Municipal Stadium =

Baseball stadium

- Phoenix Muni
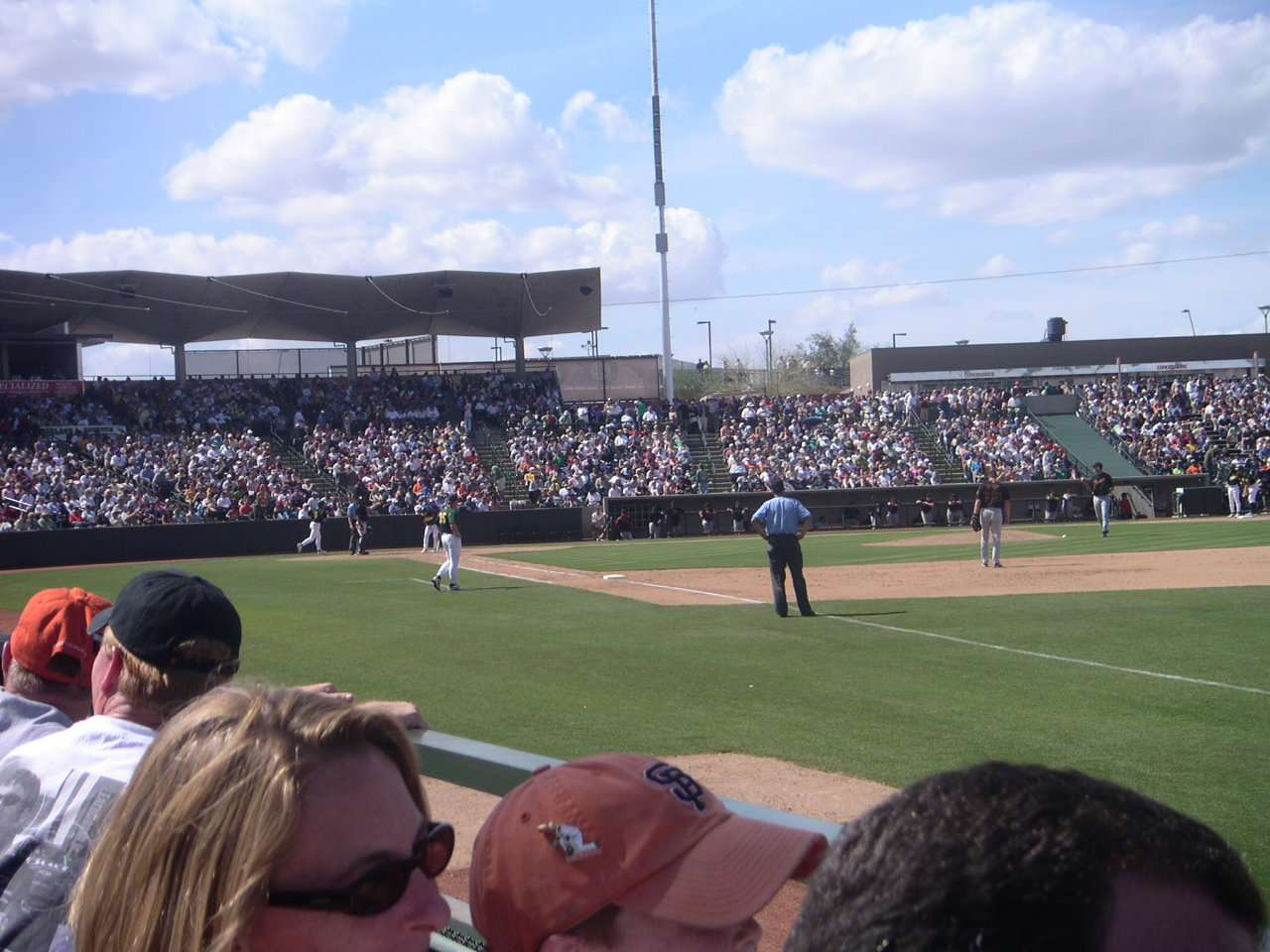
- Phoenix Municipal Stadium during spring training, 2005
- Interactive map of Phoenix Municipal Stadium
- Location: 5999 E. Van Buren Street; Phoenix, AZ 85008
- Coordinates: 33°26′56″N 111°57′20″W
- Operator: Arizona State University
- Capacity: 8,775
- Surface: Grass
- Field size: Left – 345 ft. Center – 410 ft. Right – 345 ft.
- Public transit: Priest Drive/Washington

Construction
- Opened: March 8, 1964
- Architect: Fred M. Guirey
- Main contractor: Del E. Webb

Tenants
- Arizona State Sun Devils (NCAA) (1964–1973, 2015–present); San Francisco Giants (MLB) (spring training, 1964–1981); Phoenix Giants/Firebirds (PCL) (1966–1991); Oakland Athletics (MLB) (spring training, 1982–2014); Phoenix/Mesa Saguaros (AFL) (1992; 1996); Phoenix Desert Dogs (AFL) (1995–2002; 2004–2012)

Phoenix Municipal Stadium is a baseball stadium, located in Phoenix, Arizona. It is often referred in short as Phoenix Muni. The stadium was built in 1964 and holds 8,775 people. It is the home of the Arizona State Sun Devils baseball program, having hosted the team since the start of their 2015 season. It is a former spring training home to the Oakland A's, serving in that role from 1982 to 2014. The San Francisco Giants previously held spring training at the ballpark from 1964 to 1981, when they moved to Scottsdale Stadium.

== Old Phoenix Municipal Stadium (1936–1963) ==
Harry Nace donated the land (the block bounded by E Mohave St., S 2nd St., E Pima St., and S 3rd St.) used as for the ball park. Phoenix and Public Works Administration erected a grand stand at a cost of approximately $57,000, which was leased to Harry Nace.

The original Phoenix Municipal Stadium was located at Central and Mohave streets, near downtown Phoenix. The ballpark opened in 1936 and had seating for around 3,000 spectators. Lights were installed by 1937.

The old stadium was used for various local baseball games, wrestling, and dog racing until 1946, when the New York Giants made arrangements to begin spring training there. The stadium required renovations and an injunction was filed against holding any further dog races at the stadium site to bring the Giants to town.

The Giants played their first game against major league opposition at the old stadium on March 9, 1947, defeating the Cleveland Indians 8–7 in front of a crowd of 8,000. The Phoenix Senators of the Arizona-Texas league also held games there in 1947.

The Giants renewed their agreement in April 1947 to stay at the stadium until 1950. They ultimately played there until 1963, when they moved to the new stadium.

Old Phoenix Municipal Stadium would be renamed Central Stadium, hosting roller derby, circuses and political rallies until its demolition in October 1969.

== Stadium History (1964–current) ==
The Phoenix city council approved construction of a new municipal stadium at Papago Park on June 4, 1962, to fully replace the old stadium. Plans for the stadium notably included six water fountains, as they were not originally included at the then-new Dodger Stadium. However, construction was delayed a year, in part because the stadium was meant to be partially funded by selling the land the old stadium sat on - only one bidder appeared at the auction, and only bid on the parking lot, leaving a funding gap.

The council finally agreed to another approval on April 23, 1963, with the architect's proposed budget of $605,300.

The first spring training game was played on March 8, 1964, in which the Giants beat Cleveland, 6–2. Willie Mays hit the first home run at the park, in front of a crowd of 8,582. In attendance, for the dedication ceremonies, were Commissioner Ford Frick, National League President Warren Giles, and Giants owner Horace Stoneham.

The stadium hosted a "welcome home" rally for presidential candidate Barry Goldwater on October 31, 1964, shortly before the election. It was the first time the stadium had been filled to capacity.

The city of Phoenix installed an evaporative cooling system in the stadium in 1966.

The Phoenix Giants returned in 1966 as a Triple-A affiliate of the San Francisco Giants. That year the Giants signed a five-year lease on the stadium at $15,000/year to use Phoenix Muni for spring training, Triple-A games, and winter instructional league. They rebranded as the Firebirds in 1986.

In 1981, the San Francisco Giants signed an agreement to move to Scottsdale Stadium because the city of Phoenix did not provide requested renovations. The Oakland Athletics, who previously trained in Scottsdale, signed a seven-year lease to move to the stadium. The A's also renovated the dugouts and training complex.

The Phoenix Firebirds moved from the stadium in 1992 after entering discussions with the city of Scottsdale to play at the newly rebuilt Scottsdale Stadium. At the time of the move, the Firebirds' $10,000/year rent agreement did not come close to covering the city of Phoenix's maintenance expenses.

In 2003, the stadium underwent a $6.4 million renovation. The press box facilities were enclosed - at the time, the stadium had the only open-air facilities in the Cactus League. New dugouts, better signage, improved concourse areas with benches, shading, and a historical timeline were all added.

=== Arizona State Sun Devils ===
In 2013, The Arizona Board of Regents approved Arizona State University's 25-year lease to Phoenix Municipal Stadium. The stadium is 2.5 miles from Arizona State's main campus in Tempe (and as such, accessible via the Phoenix light rail system). The ASU baseball program has history at the site, as Reggie Jackson was the first college player to hit a home run out of Phoenix Municipal Stadium. The Sun Devils started play in 2015 after which Packard Stadium, their former venue, was redeveloped to help pay for planned improvements to the ASU football facility, Sun Devil Stadium.

Arizona State had previously played selected games at the stadium in the 1960s, especially against their rival, the University of Arizona.

=== Other events ===
The stadium has also hosted Arizona Fall League games during the fall. It hosted the home games of the Phoenix Desert Dogs until their 2013 move to Glendale. The Arizona Diamondbacks’ rookie league team, the Phoenix Diamondbacks, also played in the stadium when the team played in the Arizona League. Several of the Arizona high school baseball championships are played there in early May.

== Lighting ==
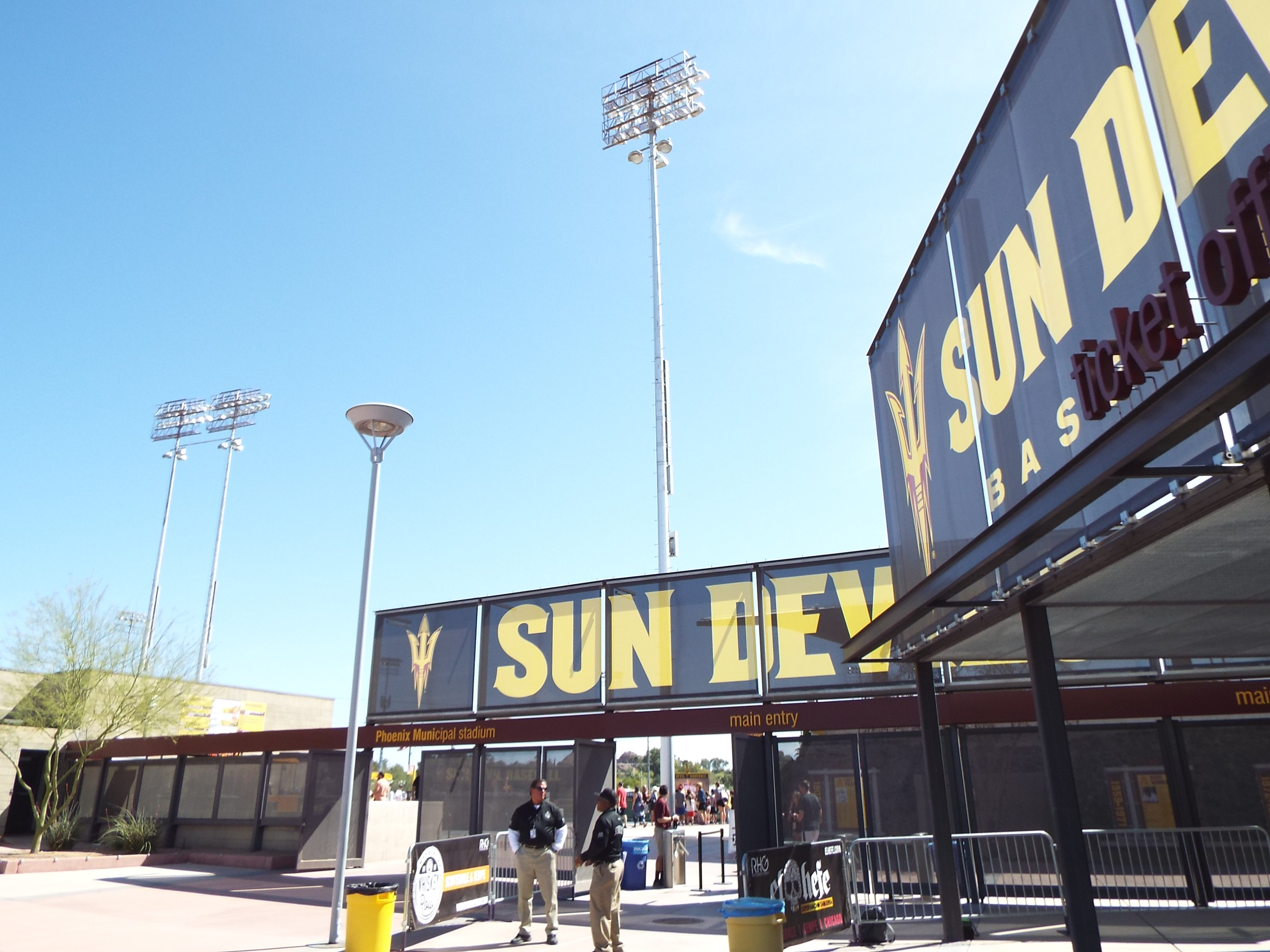
Main entrance

The stadium's light poles are the original light poles which were installed at the Polo Grounds in New York City in 1940. They served Polo Grounds until 1964, when the stadium was demolished. Horace Stoneham, the Giants owner, shipped the light poles to Phoenix.

== Tribute Corners: The Brock and Hahn Lines ==
The outfield dimensions at Phoenix Municipal Stadium pay tribute to two iconic figures in ASU baseball history. The left-field line is marked at 333 feet in honor of legendary head coach Jim Brock, who wore number 33. Brock managed the Sun Devils from 1972 to 1994, becoming only the second varsity baseball coach in the university's history, after Bobby Winkles. He guided the program to two National Championships (1977 and 1981), four College World Series runner-up finishes, 13 College World Series appearances, and produced over 100 professional players during his tenure, including first-round picks and future All-Stars like Barry Bonds, Bob Horner, Floyd Bannister, and Hubie Brooks. In 1994, during what would be his final season, Brock courageously led the team to the College World Series while battling terminal cancer. He died just days after the tournament, cementing his legacy as a coach who gave everything to the program and its players.

The right-field line, which measures at 334 feet, is marked in recognition of Cory Hahn, a former ASU outfielder who wore number 34. Hahn's playing career was tragically cut short by a spinal injury during his freshman year in 2011, but he has since become a symbol of courage and perseverance within the baseball community.

== Concerts ==
Phoenix Muni hosted outdoor concerts from major touring acts in the years before Desert Sky Pavilion, an outdoor amphitheatre, opened on the west side of Phoenix in 1990.

Black Sabbath and Blue Öyster Cult performed at the stadium during their Heaven & Hell Tour on July 25, 1980. The Police performed at the stadium during their Synchronicity Tour on September 8, 1983. AC/DC performed at the stadium during their Fly on the Wall Tour on October 17, 1985. Pink Floyd performed, on two consecutive nights, at the stadium during their A Momentary Lapse of Reason Tour on April 25–26, 1988.

== See also ==
- List of NCAA Division I baseball venues
