= 2020 South Alabama Jaguars baseball team =

College baseball season

2020 South Alabama Jaguars baseball
- Conference: Sun Belt Conference
- East Division
- Record: 8–10 (0–0 SBC)
- Head coach: Mark Calvi (9th season)
- Assistant coaches: Alan Luckie; Brad Phillips; Chris Prothro
- Home stadium: Eddie Stanky Field

2020 Sun Belt Conference baseball standings
	Conf.				Overall
Team	W		L	PCT	W		L	PCT
East Division
Coastal Carolina ‍‍‍	0	–	0	–	11	–	5	.688
Georgia Southern ‍‍‍	0	–	0	–	11	–	5	.688
Appalachian State ‍‍‍	0	–	0	–	11	–	6	.647
Georgia State ‍‍‍	0	–	0	–	9	–	7	.563
Troy ‍‍‍	0	–	0	–	9	–	8	.529
South Alabama ‍‍‍	0	–	0	–	8	–	10	.444
West Division
Texas State ‍‍‍	0	–	0	–	14	–	4	.778
UT Arlington ‍‍‍	0	–	0	–	12	–	4	.750
Louisiana–Monroe ‍‍‍	0	–	0	–	12	–	5	.706
Little Rock ‍‍‍	0	–	0	–	9	–	8	.529
Louisiana ‍‍‍	0	–	0	–	8	–	9	.471
Arkansas State ‍‍‍	0	–	0	–	7	–	9	.438
x – Division champion ‡ – Tournament champion y – Invited to the NCAA tournament As of March 12, 2020; Rankings from D1Baseball

The 2020 South Alabama Jaguars baseball team represented the University of South Alabama in the 2020 NCAA Division I baseball season. The Jaguars played their home games at Eddie Stanky Field and were led by ninth year head coach Mark Calvi.

On March 12, the Sun Belt Conference announced the indefinite suspension of all spring athletics, including baseball, due to the increasing risk of the COVID-19 pandemic.

== Preseason ==
=== Signing Day Recruits ===
Player	Hometown	Previous Team
Pitchers
Jackson Boyd	Melbourne, Australia	Northwest Florida State JC
Carson Hall	Homewood, Alabama	Shelton State CC
Cade Henry	Florence, Alabama	Florence HS
Austin Mills	Huntsville, Alabama	Madison County HS
Allen Roulette	Jacksonville, Florida	Tallahassee CC
Hitters
Hunter Donaldson	Smiths Station, Alabama	Smiths Station HS
Aries Gardner	Detroit, Michigan	Detroit Jesuit HS
Jeremy Lee	Selma, Alabama	Morgan Academy
Logan Malone	New Market, Alabama	Buckhorn HS
Carter Sanford	Fayette, Alabama	Fayette County HS
Cam Smith	Lexington, Kentucky	Lexington Christian Academy
Cameron Tissue	Sherwood, Arkansas	Crowder JC
Harrison Ware	Mountain Brook, Alabama	Mountain Brook HS

=== Sun Belt Conference Coaches Poll ===
The Sun Belt Conference Coaches Poll was released sometime on January 30, 2020 and the Jaguars were picked to finish first in the East Division and first overall in the Sun Belt.

Coaches poll (East)
Predicted finish	Team	Votes (1st place)
1	South Alabama	62 (6)
2	Coastal Carolina	61 (4)
3	Georgia Southern	50 (2)
4	Troy	41
5	Appalachian State	23
6	Georgia State	15

=== Preseason All-Sun Belt Team & Honors ===
- Drake Nightengale (USA, Sr, Pitcher)
- Zach McCambley (CCU, Jr, Pitcher)
- Levi Thomas (TROY, Jr, Pitcher)
- Andrew Papp (APP, Sr, Pitcher)
- Jack Jumper (ARST, Sr, Pitcher)
- Kale Emshoff (LR, RS-Jr, Catcher)
- Kaleb DeLatorre (USA, Sr, First Base)
- Luke Drumheller (APP, So, Second Base)
- Hayden Cantrelle (LA, Jr, Shortstop)
- Garrett Scott (LR, RS-Sr, Third Base)
- Mason McWhorter (GASO, Sr, Outfielder)
- Ethan Wilson (USA, So, Outfielder)
- Rigsby Mosley (TROY, Jr, Outfielder)
- Will Hollis (TXST, Sr, Designated Hitter)
- Andrew Beesley (ULM, Sr, Utility)

==== Preseason Player of the Year ====
- Ethan Wilson - SO, Outfielder

==== Preseason Pitcher of the Year ====
- Drake Nightengale - SR, Pitcher

== Personnel ==
=== Roster ===
2020 South Alabama Jaguars roster
Pitchers: 10 Drake Nightengale - Senior; 11 JoJo Booker - Junior; 17 Caleb Yarborough - Redshirt Senior; 18 Tyler Samaniego - Junior; 19 Andy Arguelles - Senior; 23 Steven Lacey - Junior; 24 Zach Harlan - Redshirt Sophomore; 26 Peyton Milliron - Junior; 28 Ryan Westerhoff - Junior; 30 Miles Smith - Junior; 33 Tyler Perez - Senior; 35 Jase Dalton - Redshirt Junior; 39 Noah Michael - Redshirt Junior; 40 Tyler Trussell - Redshirt Junior; 44 Matt Boswell - Junior; 45 Tyler Lehrmann - Junior; 46 Collier Baggett - Junior; 49 Nate Madej - Redshirt Junior	Catchers: 13 Richard Sorrenti - Redshirt Junior; 20 Reid Powers - Junior; 41 D. J. Law - Freshman; 42 Lane Powell - Junior; Infielders: 6 Santi Montiel - Sophomore; 8 Noah Fitzgerald - Junior; 9 Dakota Dailey - Senior; 14 Brandon Auerbach - Sophomore; 16 Kaleb Delatorre - Senior; 21 Ross Indlecoffer - Junior; 22 Hunter Stokes - Redshirt Junior; 29 Alden Davis - Junior; Outfielders: 2 Carter Quinn - Freshman; 25 Michael Sandle - Redshirt Junior; 27 Andrew Bates - Redshirt Sophomore; 31 Preston Welchel - Freshman; 32 Bennett Shell - Sophomore; 34 Ethan Wilson - Sophomore

=== Coaching staff ===
2020 South Alabama Jaguars coaching staff
- Mark Calvi – Head Coach – 9th year
- Alan Luckie – Assistant Head Coach – 14th year
- Brad Phillips – Assistant Head Coach – 2nd year
- Chris Prothro – Assistant Head Coach/Recruiting Coordinator – 5th year

== Schedule and results ==
Legend
	South Alabama win
	South Alabama loss
	Postponement/Cancelation/Suspensions
**Bold**	South Alabama team member

2020 South Alabama Jaguars baseball game log
Regular season (8-10)

February (6-6)
Date	Opponent	Rank	Site/stadium	Score	Win	Loss	Save	TV	Attendance	Overall record	SBC record
Feb. 14	Campbell		Eddie Stanky Field • Mobile, AL	**W** 1-0	**Lehrmann** (1-0)	Cowan (0-1)	None		1,207	1-0	
Feb. 15	Campbell		Eddie Stanky Field • Mobile, AL	**W** 12-10	**Arguelles** (1-0)	Moore (0-1)	**Boswell** (1)		1,186	2-0	
Feb. 15	Campbell		Eddie Stanky Field • Mobile, AL	**L** 3-7	Westlake (1-0)	**Booker** (0-1)	None		1,186	2-1	
Feb. 18	at No. 4 Vanderbilt		Hawkins Field • Nashville, TN	**L** 0-3	Leiter (1-0)	**Boswell** (0-1)	Schultz (1)	SECN+	3,033	2-2	
Feb. 19	at No. 4 Vanderbilt		Hawkins Field • Nashville, TN	**L** 0-4	Smith (1-0)	**Yarborough** (0-1)	Doolin (1)	SECN+	3,058	2-3	
South Alabama Invitational
Feb. 21	UT Martin		Eddie Stanky Field • Mobile, AL	**L** 6-7	O'Doherty (1-0)	**Lehrmann** (1-1)	Wohlbold (1)		1,304	2-4	
Feb. 22	Indiana		Eddie Stanky Field • Mobile, AL	**L** 2-4	Bierman (1-1)	**Smith** (0-1)	Brown (1)		1,318	2-5	
Feb. 22	Siena		Eddie Stanky Field • Mobile, AL	**W** 6-1	**Booker** (1-1)	Seiler (0-2)	**Dalton** (1)		1,318	3-5	
Feb. 23	Siena		Eddie Stanky Field • Mobile, AL	**W** 8-2	**Arguelles** (2-0)	St. Claire (0-1)	None		1,250	4-5	
Feb. 25	New Orleans		Eddie Stanky Field • Mobile, AL	**W** 5-0	**Boswell** (1-1)	DeMayo (1-1)	None		1,006	5-5	
Feb. 28	Gonzaga		Eddie Stanky Field • Mobile, AL	**W** 2-0	**Dalton** (1-0)	Lardner (0-2)	**Lehrmann** (1)		1,254	6-5	
Feb. 29	Gonzaga		Eddie Stanky Field • Mobile, AL	**L** 3-13	Jacob (1-1)	'Yarborough (0-2)	Hughes (1)		1,344	6-6	

March (2-4)
Date	Opponent	Rank	Site/stadium	Score	Win	Loss	Save	TV	Attendance	Overall record	SBC record
Mar. 1	Gonzaga		Eddie Stanky Field • Mobile, AL	**W** 7-6	**Trussell** (1-0)	Naughton (0-2)	None		1,138	7-6	
Mar. 3	at Alabama		Sewell–Thomas Stadium • Tuscaloosa, AL	**L** 2-12	Cobb 2-0)	**Bowell** (1-2)	None	SECN+	2,389	7-7	
Mar. 6	at No. 13 Arkansas		Baum–Walker Stadium • Fayetteville, AR	**W** 13-6	**Nightengale** (1-0)	Wicklander (2-2)	**Dalton** (2)	SECN+	8,629	8-7	
Mar. 7	at No. 13 Arkansas		Baum–Walker Stadium • Fayetteville, AR	**L** 2-15	Bolden (1-0)	**Smith** (0-2)	None	SECN+	12,006	8-8	
Mar. 8	at No. 13 Arkansas		Baum–Walker Stadium • Fayetteville, AR	**L** 3-5	Vermillion (1-0)	**Michael** (0-1)	None	SECN+	8,463	8-9	
Mar. 11	at No. 21 LSU		Alex Box Stadium, Skip Bertman Field • Baton Rouge, LA	**L** 1-4	Kaminer (3-1)	**Boswell** (1-3)	Fontenot (4)	SECN+	10,008	8-10	
Mar. 13	at Georgia State		Georgia State Baseball Complex • Atlanta, GA	Season suspended due to COVID-19 pandemic							
Mar. 14	at Georgia State		Georgia State Baseball Complex • Atlanta, GA	Season suspended due to COVID-19 pandemic							
Mar. 15	at Georgia State		Georgia State Baseball Complex • Atlanta, GA	Season suspended due to COVID-19 pandemic							
Mar. 17	at New Orleans		Maestri Field at Privateer Park • New Orleans, LA	Season suspended due to COVID-19 pandemic							
Mar. 18	No. 20 Tulane		Eddie Stanky Field • Mobile, AL	Season suspended due to COVID-19 pandemic							
Mar. 20	Georgia Southern		Eddie Stanky Field • Mobile, AL	Season suspended due to COVID-19 pandemic							
Mar. 21	Georgia Southern		Eddie Stanky Field • Mobile, AL	Season suspended due to COVID-19 pandemic							
Mar. 22	Georgia Southern		Eddie Stanky Field • Mobile, AL	Season suspended due to COVID-19 pandemic							
Mar. 24	at Southeastern Louisiana		Pat Kenelly Diamond at Alumni Field • Hammond, LA	Season suspended due to COVID-19 pandemic							
Mar. 27	Arkansas State		Eddie Stanky Field • Mobile, AL	Season suspended due to COVID-19 pandemic							
Mar. 28	Arkansas State		Eddie Stanky Field • Mobile, AL	Season suspended due to COVID-19 pandemic							
Mar. 29	Arkansas State		Eddie Stanky Field • Mobile, AL	Season suspended due to COVID-19 pandemic							

April (0-0)
Date	Opponent	Rank	Site/stadium	Score	Win	Loss	Save	TV	Attendance	Overall record	SBC record
Apr. 3	at Coastal Carolina		Springs Brooks Stadium • Conway, SC	Season suspended due to COVID-19 pandemic							
Apr. 4	at Coastal Carolina		Springs Brooks Stadium • Conway, SC	Season suspended due to COVID-19 pandemic							
Apr. 5	at Coastal Carolina		Springs Brooks Stadium • Conway, SC	Season suspended due to COVID-19 pandemic							
Apr. 9	Appalachian State		Eddie Stanky Field • Mobile, AL	Season suspended due to COVID-19 pandemic							
Apr. 10	Appalachian State		Eddie Stanky Field • Mobile, AL	Season suspended due to COVID-19 pandemic							
Apr. 11	Appalachian State		Eddie Stanky Field • Mobile, AL	Season suspended due to COVID-19 pandemic							
Apr. 14	at No. 17 Mississippi State		Dudy Noble Field • Starkville, MS	Season suspended due to COVID-19 pandemic							
Apr. 15	Alabama State		Eddie Stanky Field • Mobile, AL	Season suspended due to COVID-19 pandemic							
Apr. 17	at Louisiana–Monroe		Warhawk Field • Monroe, LA	Season suspended due to COVID-19 pandemic							
Apr. 18	at Louisiana–Monroe		Warhawk Field • Monroe, LA	Season suspended due to COVID-19 pandemic							
Apr. 19	at Louisiana–Monroe		Warhawk Field • Monroe, LA	Season suspended due to COVID-19 pandemic							
Apr. 21	at Southern Miss		Pete Taylor Park • Hattiesburg, MS	Season suspended due to COVID-19 pandemic							
Apr. 24	Louisiana		Eddie Stanky Field • Mobile, AL	Season suspended due to COVID-19 pandemic							
Apr. 25	Louisiana		Eddie Stanky Field • Mobile, AL	Season suspended due to COVID-19 pandemic							
Apr. 26	Louisiana		Eddie Stanky Field • Mobile, AL	Season suspended due to COVID-19 pandemic							
Apr. 28	Southeastern Louisiana		Eddie Stanky Field • Mobile, AL	Season suspended due to COVID-19 pandemic							

May (0–0)
Date	Opponent	Rank	Site/stadium	Score	Win	Loss	Save	TV	Attendance	Overall record	SBC record
May 1	at Little Rock		Gary Hogan Field • Little Rock, AR	Season suspended due to COVID-19 pandemic							
May 2	at Little Rock		Gary Hogan Field • Little Rock, AR	Season suspended due to COVID-19 pandemic							
May 3	at Little Rock		Gary Hogan Field • Little Rock, AR	Season suspended due to COVID-19 pandemic							
May 8	UT Arlington		Eddie Stanky Field • Mobile, AL	Season suspended due to COVID-19 pandemic							
May 9	UT Arlington		Eddie Stanky Field • Mobile, AL	Season suspended due to COVID-19 pandemic							
May 10	UT Arlington		Eddie Stanky Field • Mobile, AL	Season suspended due to COVID-19 pandemic							
May 12	Southern Miss		Eddie Stanky Field • Mobile, AL	Season suspended due to COVID-19 pandemic							
May 14	at Troy Trojans		Riddle–Pace Field • Troy, AL	Season suspended due to COVID-19 pandemic							
May 15	at Troy		Riddle–Pace Field • Troy, AL	Season suspended due to COVID-19 pandemic							
May 16	at Troy		Riddle–Pace Field • Troy, AL	Season suspended due to COVID-19 pandemic							

Postseason (0–0)

SBC Tournament (0–0)
Date	Opponent	Seed/Rank	Site/stadium	Score	Win	Loss	Save	TV	Attendance	Overall record	SBC record
May 20			Montgomery Riverwalk Stadium • Montgomery, AL	Tournament canceled due to COVID-19 pandemic							

Schedule source:

*Rankings are based on the team's current ranking in the D1Baseball poll.
