= 2020 Georgia State Panthers baseball team =

American college baseball season

2020 Georgia State Panthers baseball
- Conference: Sun Belt Conference
- East Division
- Record: 9–7 (0–0 SBC)
- Head coach: Brad Stromdahl (1st season)
- Assistant coaches: Matt Taylor; Dalton Martinez
- Home stadium: Georgia State Baseball Complex

2020 Sun Belt Conference baseball standings
	Conf.				Overall
Team	W		L	PCT	W		L	PCT
East Division
Coastal Carolina ‍‍‍	0	–	0	–	11	–	5	.688
Georgia Southern ‍‍‍	0	–	0	–	11	–	5	.688
Appalachian State ‍‍‍	0	–	0	–	11	–	6	.647
Georgia State ‍‍‍	0	–	0	–	9	–	7	.563
Troy ‍‍‍	0	–	0	–	9	–	8	.529
South Alabama ‍‍‍	0	–	0	–	8	–	10	.444
West Division
Texas State ‍‍‍	0	–	0	–	14	–	4	.778
UT Arlington ‍‍‍	0	–	0	–	12	–	4	.750
Louisiana–Monroe ‍‍‍	0	–	0	–	12	–	5	.706
Little Rock ‍‍‍	0	–	0	–	9	–	8	.529
Louisiana ‍‍‍	0	–	0	–	8	–	9	.471
Arkansas State ‍‍‍	0	–	0	–	7	–	9	.438
x – Division champion ‡ – Tournament champion y – Invited to the NCAA tournament As of March 12, 2020; Rankings from D1Baseball

The 2020 Georgia State Panthers baseball team represented Georgia State University in the 2020 NCAA Division I baseball season. The Panthers played their home games at Georgia State Baseball Complex and were led by first year head coach Brad Stromdahl.

On March 12, the Sun Belt Conference announced the indefinite suspension of all spring athletics, including baseball, due to the increasing risk of the COVID-19 pandemic.

== Preseason ==
=== Signing Day Recruits ===
Player	Hometown	Previous Team
Pitchers
Rafael Acosta	Santo Domingo, Dominican Republic	Eastern Florida State
Kyle Hilton	Savannah, Georgia	Savannah Christian Prep
Mason Patel	Knoxville, Tennessee	Webb School
Hitters
Lavoisier Fisher	Suwanee, Georgia	Georgia Highlands
Jordan Miller	Atlanta, Georgia	IMG Academy
Dalton Pearson	Johns Creek, Georgia	Johns Creek HS
Jonathan Ponder	Lawrenceville, Georgia	Parkview HS
Ashby Smith	Gaffney, South Carolina	Gulf Coast State

=== Sun Belt Conference Coaches Poll ===
The Sun Belt Conference Coaches Poll was released sometime on January 30, 2020 and the Panthers were picked to finish sixth in the East Division.

Coaches poll (East)
Predicted finish	Team	Votes (1st place)
1	South Alabama	62 (6)
2	Coastal Carolina	61 (4)
3	Georgia Southern	50 (2)
4	Troy	41
5	Appalachian State	23
6	Georgia State	15

=== Preseason All-Sun Belt Team & Honors ===
No players were chosen to the Preseason team

== Personnel ==
=== Roster ===
2020 Georgia State Panthers roster
Pitchers: 4 Seth Clark - Sophomore; 5 Brandon Haston - Freshman; 7 Joseph Brandon - Sophomore; 13 Emir Garrett - Redshirt Sophomore; 16 Griffin Bonner - Sophomore; 17 Michael Cherwenka - Junior; 20 Chad Treadway - Freshman; 22 Pablo Barquero - Junior; 23 Tyler Koch - Senior; 25 Ryan Watson - Sophomore; 26 Trey Horton - Junior; 27 Cameron Jones - Freshman; 33 Austin Ross - Redshirt Freshman; 34 Chandler Dawson - Freshman; 35 Camren Landry - Freshman; 39 Duncan Lutz - Freshman	Catchers: 8 Tanner Gallman - Junior; 15 Blaine Marchman - Freshman; 18 Elian Merejo - Senior; 19 Will Goldberg - Redshirt Sophomore; 28 Dalton Davies - Senior; Infielders: 1 Jackson Sisk - Sophomore; 2 Daino Deas - Redshirt Senior; 6 Kalen Puckett - Junior; 14 Will Mize - Freshman; 21 Griffin Cheney - Junior; 24 DeAngelo Abboud - Junior; 31 Ryan Glass - Junior; Outfielders: 3 Kyle Riesselmann - Freshman; 9 Terrell Frazier - Redshirt Junior; 11 Brandon Hill - Senior; 44 Josh Smith - Sophomore

=== Coaching staff ===
2020 Georgia State Panthers coaching staff
- Brad Stromdahl – Head Coach – 1st year
- Matt Taylor – Assistant Head Coach/Pitching Coach/Recruiting Coordinator – 1st year
- Dalton Martinez – Assistant Head Coach – 1st year

== Schedule and results ==
Legend
	Georgia State win
	Georgia State loss
	Postponement/Cancelation/Suspensions
**Bold**	Georgia State team member

2020 Georgia State Panthers baseball game log
Regular season (9-7)

February (5-4)
Date	Opponent	Rank	Site/stadium	Score	Win	Loss	Save	TV	Attendance	Overall record	SBC record
2020 Atlanta Challenge
Feb. 14	Cincinnati		Georgia State Baseball Complex • Atlanta, GA	**W** 9-8 (10 inn)	**Jones** (1-0)	Moore (0-1)	None		351	1-0	
Feb. 15	St. John's		Georgia State Baseball Complex • Atlanta, GA	**W** 7-5	**Dawson** (1-0)	Rodriguez (0-1)	**Jones** (1)		365	2-0	
Feb. 16	Saint Peter's		Georgia State Baseball Complex • Atlanta, GA	**W** 9-7	**Haston** (1-0)	Warecke (0-1)	None		251	3-0	
Feb. 19	at Gardner–Webb		John Henry Moss Stadium • Boiling Springs, NC	**L** 8-10	Casteel (1-0)	**Barquero** (0-1)	Lane (1)	ESPN+	189	3-1	
Feb. 21	Bryant		Georgia State Baseball Complex • Atlanta, GA	**L** 3-4	Harrigan (1-0)	**Jones** (1-1)	Stansky (1)		227	3-2	
Feb. 22	Bryant		Georgia State Baseball Complex • Atlanta, GA	**W** 7-4	**Watson** (1-0)	Schoff (0-2)	None		297	4-2	
Feb. 23	Bryant		Georgia State Baseball Complex • Atlanta, GA	**L** 1-5	Garofalo (1-0)	**Koch** (0-1)	None		289	4-3	
Feb. 26	at Western Carolina		Hennon Stadium • Cullowhee, NC	**W** 10-9 (10 inn)	**Brandon** (1-0)	Franklin (1-1)	None		107	5-3	
Feb. 29	at East Tennessee State		Thomas Stadium • Johnson City, TN	**L** 3-9	Knack (3-0)	**Clark** (0-1)	None		319	5-4	

March (4-3)
Date	Opponent	Rank	Site/stadium	Score	Win	Loss	Save	TV	Attendance	Overall record	SBC record
Mar. 1	East Tennessee State		Thomas Stadium • Johnson City, TN	**L** 7-18	Stuart (1-1)	**Watson** (1-1)	Bollenbacher (1)		401	5-5	
Mar. 1	East Tennessee State		Thomas Stadium • Johnson City, TN	**L** 4-5 (10 inn)	Mercer (2-0)	**Treadway** (0-1)	None		407	5-6	
Mar. 4	Georgia Tech		Georgia State Baseball Complex • Atlanta, GA	Game postponed due to inclement weather							
Mar. 6	North Alabama		Georgia State Baseball Complex • Atlanta, GA	**W** 6-5	**Brandon** (2-0)	Moore (0-1)	None	ESPN+	297	6-6	
Mar. 7	North Alabama		Georgia State Baseball Complex • Atlanta, GA	**W** 9-4	**Watson** (2-1)	Laws (0-3)	None		346	7-6	
Mar. 8	North Alabama		Georgia State Baseball Complex • Atlanta, GA	**W** 3-1	**Jones** (2-1)	Best (1-3)	**Brandon** (1)		367	8-6	
Mar. 10	Mercer		Georgia State Baseball Complex • Atlanta, GA	**L** 5-9	Farmer (2-0)	**Haston** (1-1)	None	ESPN+	231	8-7	
Mar. 11	UNC Asheville		Georgia State Baseball Complex • Atlanta, GA	**W** 10-7	**Lutz** (1-0)	Serricchio (0-2)	**Landry** (1)		201	9-7	
Mar. 13	South Alabama		Georgia State Baseball Complex • Atlanta, GA	Season suspended due to COVID-19 pandemic							
Mar. 14	South Alabama		Georgia State Baseball Complex • Atlanta, GA	Season suspended due to COVID-19 pandemic							
Mar. 15	South Alabama		Georgia State Baseball Complex • Atlanta, GA	Season suspended due to COVID-19 pandemic							
Mar. 17	Tennessee		Lindsey Nelson Stadium • Knoxville, TN	Season suspended due to COVID-19 pandemic							
Mar. 20	at UT Arlington		Clay Gould Ballpark • Arlington, TX	Season suspended due to COVID-19 pandemic							
Mar. 21	at UT Arlington		Clay Gould Ballpark • Arlington, TX	Season suspended due to COVID-19 pandemic							
Mar. 22	at UT Arlington		Clay Gould Ballpark • Arlington, TX	Season suspended due to COVID-19 pandemic							
Mar. 25	Kennesaw State		Georgia State Baseball Complex • Atlanta, GA	Season suspended due to COVID-19 pandemic							
Mar. 27	Louisiana		Georgia State Baseball Complex • Atlanta, GA	Season suspended due to COVID-19 pandemic							
Mar. 28	Louisiana		Georgia State Baseball Complex • Atlanta, GA	Season suspended due to COVID-19 pandemic							
Mar. 29	Louisiana		Georgia State Baseball Complex • Atlanta, GA	Season suspended due to COVID-19 pandemic							
Mar. 31	at No. 3 Georgia		Foley Field • Athens, GA	Season suspended due to COVID-19 pandemic							

April (0-0)
Date	Opponent	Rank	Site/stadium	Score	Win	Loss	Save	TV	Attendance	Overall record	SBC record
Apr. 3	Little Rock		Georgia State Baseball Complex • Atlanta, GA	Season suspended due to COVID-19 pandemic							
Apr. 4	Little Rock		Georgia State Baseball Complex • Atlanta, GA	Season suspended due to COVID-19 pandemic							
Apr. 5	Little Rock		Georgia State Baseball Complex • Atlanta, GA	Season suspended due to COVID-19 pandemic							
Apr. 7	Presbyterian		Georgia State Baseball Complex • Atlanta, GA	Season suspended due to COVID-19 pandemic							
Apr. 9	at Troy		Riddle–Pace Field • Troy, AL	Season suspended due to COVID-19 pandemic							
Apr. 10	at Troy		Riddle–Pace Field • Troy, AL	Season suspended due to COVID-19 pandemic							
Apr. 11	at Troy		Riddle–Pace Field • Troy, AL	Season suspended due to COVID-19 pandemic							
Apr. 15	at Mercer		Claude Smith Field • Macon, GA	Season suspended due to COVID-19 pandemic							
Apr. 17	Texas State		Georgia State Baseball Complex • Atlanta, GA	Season suspended due to COVID-19 pandemic							
Apr. 18	Texas State		Georgia State Baseball Complex • Atlanta, GA	Season suspended due to COVID-19 pandemic							
Apr. 19	Texas State		Georgia State Baseball Complex • Atlanta, GA	Season suspended due to COVID-19 pandemic							
Apr. 21	at Presbyterian		Presbyterian Baseball Complex • Clinton, SC	Season suspended due to COVID-19 pandemic							
Apr. 24	at Arkansas State		Tomlinson Stadium–Kell Field • Jonesboro, AR	Season suspended due to COVID-19 pandemic							
Apr. 25	at Arkansas State		Tomlinson Stadium–Kell Field • Jonesboro, AR	Season suspended due to COVID-19 pandemic							
Apr. 26	at Arkansas State		Tomlinson Stadium–Kell Field • Jonesboro, AR	Season suspended due to COVID-19 pandemic							
Apr. 29	at Kennesaw State		Fred Stillwell Stadium • Kennesaw, GA	Season suspended due to COVID-19 pandemic							

May (0–0)
Date	Opponent	Rank	Site/stadium	Score	Win	Loss	Save	TV	Attendance	Overall record	SBC record
May 1	at Coastal Carolina		Springs Brooks Stadium • Conway, SC	Season suspended due to COVID-19 pandemic							
May 2	at Coastal Carolina		Springs Brooks Stadium • Conway, SC	Season suspended due to COVID-19 pandemic							
May 3	at Coastal Carolina		Springs Brooks Stadium • Conway, SC	Season suspended due to COVID-19 pandemic							
May 5	at Georgia Tech		Russ Chandler Stadium • Atlanta, GA	Season suspended due to COVID-19 pandemic							
May 6	Georgia Tech		Georgia State Baseball Complex • Atlanta, GA	Season suspended due to COVID-19 pandemic							
May 8	Appalachian State		Georgia State Baseball Complex • Atlanta, GA	Season suspended due to COVID-19 pandemic							
May 9	Appalachian State		Georgia State Baseball Complex • Atlanta, GA	Season suspended due to COVID-19 pandemic							
May 10	Appalachian State		Georgia State Baseball Complex • Atlanta, GA	Season suspended due to COVID-19 pandemic							
May 12	at UNC Asheville		Greenwood Baseball Field • Asheville, NC	Season suspended due to COVID-19 pandemic							
May 14	at Georgia Southern		J. I. Clements Stadium • Statesboro, GA	Season suspended due to COVID-19 pandemic							
May 15	at Georgia Southern		J. I. Clements Stadium • Statesboro, GA	Season suspended due to COVID-19 pandemic							
May 16	at Georgia Southern		J. I. Clements Stadium • Statesboro, GA	Season suspended due to COVID-19 pandemic							

Postseason (0–0)

SBC Tournament (0–0)
Date	Opponent	Seed/Rank	Site/stadium	Score	Win	Loss	Save	TV	Attendance	Overall record	SBC record
May 20			Montgomery Riverwalk Stadium • Montgomery, AL	Tournament canceled due to COVID-19 pandemic							

Schedule source:

*Rankings are based on the team's current ranking in the D1Baseball poll.
