= 2020 Louisiana Ragin' Cajuns baseball team =

American college baseball season

2020 Louisiana Ragin' Cajuns baseball
- Conference: Sun Belt Conference
- West Division
- Record: 8–9 (0–0 SBC)
- Head coach: Matt Deggs (1st season)
- Assistant coaches: Anthony Babineaux; Jeremy Talbert; Jake Wells
- Home stadium: M. L. Tigue Moore Field at Russo Park

2020 Sun Belt Conference baseball standings
	Conf.				Overall
Team	W		L	PCT	W		L	PCT
East Division
Coastal Carolina ‍‍‍	0	–	0	–	11	–	5	.688
Georgia Southern ‍‍‍	0	–	0	–	11	–	5	.688
Appalachian State ‍‍‍	0	–	0	–	11	–	6	.647
Georgia State ‍‍‍	0	–	0	–	9	–	7	.563
Troy ‍‍‍	0	–	0	–	9	–	8	.529
South Alabama ‍‍‍	0	–	0	–	8	–	10	.444
West Division
Texas State ‍‍‍	0	–	0	–	14	–	4	.778
UT Arlington ‍‍‍	0	–	0	–	12	–	4	.750
Louisiana–Monroe ‍‍‍	0	–	0	–	12	–	5	.706
Little Rock ‍‍‍	0	–	0	–	9	–	8	.529
Louisiana ‍‍‍	0	–	0	–	8	–	9	.471
Arkansas State ‍‍‍	0	–	0	–	7	–	9	.438
x – Division champion ‡ – Tournament champion y – Invited to the NCAA tournament As of March 12, 2020; Rankings from D1Baseball

The 2020 Louisiana Ragin' Cajuns baseball team represented the University of Louisiana at Lafayette in the 2020 NCAA Division I baseball season. The Ragin' Cajuns played their home games at M. L. Tigue Moore Field at Russo Park and were led by first year head coach Matt Deggs.

This season was also their first with new head coach Matt Deggs. This came after Head Coach Tony Robichaux’s death on July 3, 2019 after suffering from a massive heart attack. Deggs had previously served as Assistant under Robichaux from 2012 to 2014. He had also served as head coach at Sam Houston State from 2015 to 2019 and Texarkana College from 1998 to 2002 and stints as assistant at Northwestern State, Arkansas, and Texas A&M.

On March 12, the Sun Belt Conference announced the indefinite suspension of all spring athletics, including baseball, due to the increasing risk of the COVID-19 pandemic. On March 13, Louisiana governor John Bel Edwards signed an executive order banning gatherings of over 250 people until as early as April 18, thus ending all possible future 2020 home or in-state games until that time if the season were to continue. Soon after, the Sun Belt cancelled all season and postseason play.

== Preseason ==
=== Signing Day Recruits ===
Player	Hometown	Previous Team
Pitchers
Spencer Arrighetti	Katy, Texas	Navarro JC
Chad Brown	McKinney, Texas	McKinney Boyd HS
Hayden Durke	Abbeville, Louisiana	North Vermillion HS
Peyton Havard	Orange, Texas	Bridge City HS
Blake Marshall	Mandeville, Louisiana	Hinds JC
Chipper Menard	New Iberia, Louisiana	New Iberia Senior HS
Hitters
Sam Bianco	Oxford, Mississippi	Oxford HS
Clayton Dean	Tomball, Texas	Cypress Community Christian
Conor Higgs	Texas City, Texas	Texas City HS
Bobby Lada	Richmond, Texas	Bossier Parish CC
Carson Roccaforte	Port Neches, Texas	Port Neches–Groves HS

=== Sun Belt Conference Coaches Poll ===
The Sun Belt Conference Coaches Poll will be released sometime around January 30, 2020 and the Cajuns were picked to finish second in the West Division and second overall in the conference.

Coaches poll (West)
Predicted finish	Team	Votes (1st place)
1	UT Arlington	58 (3)
2	Louisiana	57 (5)
3	Texas State	55 (3)
4	Little Rock	39 (1)
5	Louisiana–Monroe	25
6	Arkansas State	18

=== Preseason All-Sun Belt Team & Honors ===
- Drake Nightengale (USA, Sr, Pitcher)
- Zach McCambley (CCU, Jr, Pitcher)
- Levi Thomas (TROY, Jr, Pitcher)
- Andrew Papp (APP, Sr, Pitcher)
- Jack Jumper (ARST, Sr, Pitcher)
- Kale Emshoff (LR, RS-Jr, Catcher)
- Kaleb DeLatorre (USA, Sr, First Base)
- Luke Drumheller (APP, So, Second Base)
- Hayden Cantrelle (LA, Jr, Shortstop)
- Garrett Scott (LR, RS-Sr, Third Base)
- Mason McWhorter (GASO, Sr, Outfielder)
- Ethan Wilson (USA, So, Outfielder)
- Rigsby Mosley (TROY, Jr, Outfielder)
- Will Hollis (TXST, Sr, Designated Hitter)
- Andrew Beesley (ULM, Sr, Utility)

== Roster ==
2020 Louisiana Ragin' Cajuns roster
Pitchers: 2 Connor Cooke - Sophomore; 15 Jacob Schultz - Junior; 16 Austin Bradford - Redshirt Junior; 17 Connor Angel - Junior; 20 Brock Batty - Junior; 24 Caleb Armstrong - Senior; 27 Austin Perrin - Junior; 32 Brandon Young - Senior; 37 Dane Dixon - Redshirt Junior; 38 Jason Nelson - Junior; 40 William Moriarty - Redshirt Sophomore; 45 Jack Burk - Senior; 48 David Williams - Redshirt Junior; 49 Luke Cronan - Junior; 50 Carter Robinson - Junior; 51 Jeff Wilson - Junior	Catchers: 6 Nick Hagedorn - Junior; 11 Julian Brock - Freshman; 13 Sebastian Toro - Redshirt Junior; Infielders: 1 Connor Dupuy - Redshirt Sophomore; 5 Hayden Cantrelle - Junior; 12 Jonathan Windham - Redshirt Sophomore; 23 Brandon Talley - Junior; 26 Jonathan Brandon - Redshirt Junior; 44 Zeph Hoffpauir - Freshman	Outfielders: 4 Brennan Breaux - Redshirt Senior; 10 Alex Hannie - Redshirt Sophomore; 14 Tremaine Spears - Redshirt Junior; 21 Connor Kimple - Junior; 33 Colton Frank - Sophomore; 41 Gavin Bourgeois - Redshirt Senior; Utility: 34 Ben Fitzgerald - Junior; 52 Justin Greene - Junior

=== Coaching staff ===
2020 Louisiana Ragin' Cajuns coaching staff
- Matt Deggs – Head Coach & Pitching Coach – 1st year
- Anthony Babineaux – Associate Head Coach and Director of Player and Program Development– 26th year
- Jeremy Talbot – Assistant Head Coach – 6th year
- Jake Wells – Assistant Head Coach, Batting coach – 2nd year
- BJ Ryan – Volunteer Assistant Coach – 1st year
- Chris Domingue – Academic & Camp Coordinator – 17th year
- James Lang – assistant director of Athletic Performance for Olympic Sports – 1st year
- Joey Bearb – Clubhouse Manager
- Carter Munchrath – Clubhouse Manager
- Zackary Crain – Clubhouse Manager
- Aidan Serio – Clubhouse Manager
- Austin Belaire – Field Manager
- Victoria Stringer – Student Assistant

== Schedule and results ==
Legend
	Louisiana win
	Louisiana loss
	Postponement/Cancelation/Suspensions
**Bold**	Louisiana team member

2020 Louisiana Ragin' Cajuns baseball game log
Regular season (8-9)

February (3-8)
Date	Opponent	Rank	Site/stadium	Score	Win	Loss	Save	TV	Attendance	Overall record	SBC record
Feb. 14	Southeastern Louisiana	No. 24	M. L. Tigue Moore Field at Russo Park • Lafayette, LA	**L** 2-3	Shaffer (1-0)	**Angel** (0-1)	Warren (1)	Ragin' Cajuns Digital Network	5,472	0-1	
Feb. 15	Louisiana Tech	No. 24	M. L. Tigue Moore Field at Russo Park • Lafayette, LA	**L** 1-2	Fincher (1-0)	**Moriarty** (0-1)	Crigger (1)	Ragin' Cajuns Digital Network	5,109	0-2	
Feb. 15	Louisiana Tech	No. 24	M. L. Tigue Moore Field at Russo Park • Lafayette, LA	**L** 0-10	Whorff (1-0)	**Schultz** (0-1)	None	Ragin' Cajuns Digital Network	4,881	0-3	
Feb. 18	at Southeastern Louisiana		Pat Kenelly Diamond at Alumni Field • Hammond, LA	**W** 9-6	**Young** (1-0)	Dugas (0-1)	**Cooke** (1)	Southeastern Network	1,321	1-3	
Feb. 19	Tulane		M. L. Tigue Moore Field at Russo Park • Lafayette, LA	**L** 6-9	Janetta (1-0)	**Batty** (0-1)	Gillies (2)	Ragin' Cajuns Digital Network	4,540	1-4	
Feb. 21	Virginia Tech		M. L. Tigue Moore Field at Russo Park • Lafayette, LA	**W** 2-0	**Angel** (1-1)	Gerard (0-1)	**Cooke** (2)	Ragin' Cajuns Digital Network	4,740	2-4	
Feb. 22	Virginia Tech		M. L. Tigue Moore Field at Russo Park • Lafayette, LA	**L** 2-3	Simonelli (1-1)	**Moriarty** (0-2)	Alford (1)	Ragin' Cajuns Digital Network	5,009	2-5	
Feb. 23	Virginia Tech		M. L. Tigue Moore Field at Russo Park • Lafayette, LA	**L** 0-3	Seymour (2-0)	**Robinson** (0-1)	Starliper (1)	Ragin' Cajuns Digital Network	4,707	2-6	
Feb. 26	Northwestern State		M. L. Tigue Moore Field at Russo Park • Lafayette, LA	**L** 8-10	David (2-0)	**Schultz** (0-2)	Swanson (2)	Ragin' Cajuns Digital Network	4,608	2-7	
Feb. 28	Sam Houston State		M. L. Tigue Moore Field at Russo Park • Lafayette, LA	**L** 4-5 (11 inn)	Lusk (2-0)	**Cooke** (0-1)	None	Ragin' Cajuns Digital Network	4,690	2-8	
Feb. 29	Sam Houston State		M. L. Tigue Moore Field at Russo Park • Lafayette, LA	**W** 1-0	**Young** (2-0)	Robinson (1-1)	None	Ragin' Cajuns Digital Network	4,762	3-8	

March (5-1)
Date	Opponent	Rank	Site/stadium	Score	Win	Loss	Save	TV	Attendance	Overall record	SBC record
Mar. 1	Sam Houston State		M. L. Tigue Moore Field at Russo Park • Lafayette, LA	**W** 7-5	**Talley** (1-0)	Dillard (1-1)	**Schultz** (1)	Ragin' Cajuns Digital Network	4,000	4-8	
Mar. 3	at Rice		Reckling Park • Houston, TX	**W** 11-2	**Robinson** (1-1)	Larzabal (0-1)	None		1,943	5-8	
Diamond Invitational
Mar. 6	vs. Samford		Admiral Fetterman Field • Pensacola, FL	**L** 4-12	Strickland (3-0)	**Angel** (1-2)	None		1,000	5-9	
Mar. 7	vs. Michigan State		Admiral Fetterman Field • Pensacola, FL	**W** 6-3	**Young** (3-0)	Christopherson (1-1)	**Talley** (1)		1,114	6-9	
Mar. 8	vs. Troy		Admiral Fetterman Field • Pensacola, FL	**W** 8-4	**Moriarty** (1-2)	Ellis (0-1)	None		919	7-9	
Mar. 10	at McNeese State		Joe Miller Ballpark • Lake Charles, LA	**W** 7-0	**Robinson**	Strahan	None		1,088	8-9	
Mar. 13	Coastal Carolina		M. L. Tigue Moore Field at Russo Park • Lafayette, LA	Season suspended due to COVID-19 pandemic							
Mar. 14	Coastal Carolina		M. L. Tigue Moore Field at Russo Park • Lafayette, LA	Season suspended due to COVID-19 pandemic							
Mar. 15	Coastal Carolina		M. L. Tigue Moore Field at Russo Park • Lafayette, LA	Season suspended due to COVID-19 pandemic							
Mar. 17	Lamar		M. L. Tigue Moore Field at Russo Park • Lafayette, LA	Season suspended due to COVID-19 pandemic							
Mar. 18	Nicholls		M. L. Tigue Moore Field at Russo Park • Lafayette, LA	Season suspended due to COVID-19 pandemic							
Mar. 20	at Appalachian State		Beaver Field at Jim and Bettie Smith Stadium • Boone, NC	Season suspended due to COVID-19 pandemic							
Mar. 21	at Appalachian State		Beaver Field at Jim and Bettie Smith Stadium • Boone, NC	Season suspended due to COVID-19 pandemic							
Mar. 22	at Appalachian State		Beaver Field at Jim and Bettie Smith Stadium • Boone, NC	Season suspended due to COVID-19 pandemic							
Mar. 24	Louisiana Tech		M. L. Tigue Moore Field at Russo Park • Lafayette, LA	Season suspended due to COVID-19 pandemic							
Mar. 27	at Georgia State		Georgia State Baseball Complex • Atlanta, GA	Season suspended due to COVID-19 pandemic							
Mar. 28	at Georgia State		Georgia State Baseball Complex • Atlanta, GA	Season suspended due to COVID-19 pandemic							
Mar. 29	at Georgia State		Georgia State Baseball Complex • Atlanta, GA	Season suspended due to COVID-19 pandemic							
Mar. 31	McNeese State		M. L. Tigue Moore Field at Russo Park • Lafayette, LA	Season suspended due to COVID-19 pandemic							

April (0-0)
Date	Opponent	Rank	Site/stadium	Score	Win	Loss	Save	TV	Attendance	Overall record	SBC record
Apr. 1	at Tulane		Greer Field at Turchin Stadium • New Orleans, LA	Season suspended due to COVID-19 pandemic							
Apr. 3	UT Arlington		M. L. Tigue Moore Field at Russo Park • Lafayette, LA	Season suspended due to COVID-19 pandemic							
Apr. 4	UT Arlington		M. L. Tigue Moore Field at Russo Park • Lafayette, LA	Season suspended due to COVID-19 pandemic							
Apr. 5	UT Arlington		M. L. Tigue Moore Field at Russo Park • Lafayette, LA	Season suspended due to COVID-19 pandemic							
Apr. 7	at LSU		Alex Box Stadium, Skip Bertman Field • Baton Rouge, LA	Season suspended due to COVID-19 pandemic							
Apr. 9	at Texas State		Bobcat Ballpark • San Marcos, TX	Season suspended due to COVID-19 pandemic							
Apr. 10	at Texas State		Bobcat Ballpark • San Marcos, TX	Season suspended due to COVID-19 pandemic							
Apr. 11	at Texas State		Bobcat Ballpark • San Marcos, TX	Season suspended due to COVID-19 pandemic							
Apr. 14	Houston		M. L. Tigue Moore Field at Russo Park • Lafayette, LA	Season suspended due to COVID-19 pandemic							
Apr. 15	Houston		M. L. Tigue Moore Field at Russo Park • Lafayette, LA	Season suspended due to COVID-19 pandemic							
Apr. 17	Little Rock		M. L. Tigue Moore Field at Russo Park • Lafayette, LA	Season suspended due to COVID-19 pandemic							
Apr. 18	Little Rock		M. L. Tigue Moore Field at Russo Park • Lafayette, LA	Season suspended due to COVID-19 pandemic							
Apr. 19	Little Rock		M. L. Tigue Moore Field at Russo Park • Lafayette, LA	Season suspended due to COVID-19 pandemic							
Apr. 24	at South Alabama		Eddie Stanky Field • Mobile, AL	Season suspended due to COVID-19 pandemic							
Apr. 25	at South Alabama		Eddie Stanky Field • Mobile, AL	Season suspended due to COVID-19 pandemic							
Apr. 26	at South Alabama		Eddie Stanky Field • Mobile, AL	Season suspended due to COVID-19 pandemic							
Apr. 28	at Louisiana Tech		Ruston HS Baseball Stadium • Ruston, LA	Season suspended due to COVID-19 pandemic							

May (0–0)
Date	Opponent	Rank	Site/stadium	Score	Win	Loss	Save	TV	Attendance	Overall record	SBC record
May 1	Georgia Southern		M. L. Tigue Moore Field at Russo Park • Lafayette, LA	Season suspended due to COVID-19 pandemic							
May 2	Georgia Southern		M. L. Tigue Moore Field at Russo Park • Lafayette, LA	Season suspended due to COVID-19 pandemic							
May 3	Georgia Southern		M. L. Tigue Moore Field at Russo Park • Lafayette, LA	Season suspended due to COVID-19 pandemic							
May 8	at Arkansas State		Tomlinson Stadium–Kell Field • Jonesboro, AR	Season suspended due to COVID-19 pandemic							
May 9	at Arkansas State		Tomlinson Stadium–Kell Field • Jonesboro, AR	Season suspended due to COVID-19 pandemic							
May 10	at Arkansas State		Tomlinson Stadium–Kell Field • Jonesboro, AR	Season suspended due to COVID-19 pandemic							
May 14	Louisiana–Monroe		M. L. Tigue Moore Field at Russo Park • Lafayette, LA	Season suspended due to COVID-19 pandemic							
May 15	Louisiana–Monroe		M. L. Tigue Moore Field at Russo Park • Lafayette, LA	Season suspended due to COVID-19 pandemic							
May 16	Louisiana–Monroe		M. L. Tigue Moore Field at Russo Park • Lafayette, LA	Season suspended due to COVID-19 pandemic							

Postseason (0–0)

SBC Tournament (0–0)
Date	Opponent	Seed/Rank	Site/stadium	Score	Win	Loss	Save	TV	Attendance	Overall record	SBC record
May 20			Montgomery Riverwalk Stadium • Montgomery, AL	Championship Series most likely to be suspended due to COVID-19 pandemic							

Schedule source:

*Rankings are based on the team's current ranking in the D1Baseball poll.
