= 2020 Georgia Southern Eagles baseball team =

American college baseball season

2020 Georgia Southern Eagles baseball
- Conference: Sun Belt Conference
- East Division
- Record: 11–5 (0–0 SBC)
- Head coach: Rodney Hennon (20th season)
- Assistant coaches: B. J. Green; Alan Beck
- Home stadium: J. I. Clements Stadium

2020 Sun Belt Conference baseball standings
	Conf.				Overall
Team	W		L	PCT	W		L	PCT
East Division
Coastal Carolina ‍‍‍	0	–	0	–	11	–	5	.688
Georgia Southern ‍‍‍	0	–	0	–	11	–	5	.688
Appalachian State ‍‍‍	0	–	0	–	11	–	6	.647
Georgia State ‍‍‍	0	–	0	–	9	–	7	.563
Troy ‍‍‍	0	–	0	–	9	–	8	.529
South Alabama ‍‍‍	0	–	0	–	8	–	10	.444
West Division
Texas State ‍‍‍	0	–	0	–	14	–	4	.778
UT Arlington ‍‍‍	0	–	0	–	12	–	4	.750
Louisiana–Monroe ‍‍‍	0	–	0	–	12	–	5	.706
Little Rock ‍‍‍	0	–	0	–	9	–	8	.529
Louisiana ‍‍‍	0	–	0	–	8	–	9	.471
Arkansas State ‍‍‍	0	–	0	–	7	–	9	.438
x – Division champion ‡ – Tournament champion y – Invited to the NCAA tournament As of March 12, 2020; Rankings from D1Baseball

The 2020 Georgia Southern Eagles baseball team represented Georgia Southern Eagles in the 2020 NCAA Division I baseball season. The Eagles played their home games at J. I. Clements Stadium and were led by twentieth year head coach Rodney Hennon.

On March 12, the Sun Belt Conference announced the indefinite suspension of all spring athletics, including baseball, due to the increasing risk of the COVID-19 pandemic.

== Preseason ==
=== Signing Day Recruits ===
Player	Hometown	Previous Team
Pitchers
Anthony DiMola	Cumming, Georgia	North Forsythe HS
Chase Dollander	Evans, Georgia	Greenbrier HS
Jackson Dyer	Gainesville, Georgia	North Hall HS
Jeremy Gay	Millen, Georgia	Edmund Burke Academy
Ben Johnson	Tucker, Georgia	Providence Christian Academy
Hitters
Corey Dowdell	Kingsland, Georgia	Camden County HS
Hayden Duffield	Woodstock, Georgia	River Ridge HS
Jarrett Jenkins	Auburn, Georgia	Dacula HS
Jordan McCladdie	Harlem, Georgia	Harlem HS
Jeffrey Preacher	Pace, Florida	Pace HS

=== Sun Belt Conference Coaches Poll ===
The Sun Belt Conference Coaches Poll was released sometime on January 30, 2020 and the Eagles were picked to finish third in the East Division and sixth overall in the conference.

Coaches poll (East)
Predicted finish	Team	Votes (1st place)
1	South Alabama	62 (6)
2	Coastal Carolina	61 (4)
3	Georgia Southern	50 (2)
4	Troy	41
5	Appalachian State	23
6	Georgia State	15

=== Preseason All-Sun Belt Team & Honors ===
- Drake Nightengale (USA, Sr, Pitcher)
- Zach McCambley (CCU, Jr, Pitcher)
- Levi Thomas (TROY, Jr, Pitcher)
- Andrew Papp (APP, Sr, Pitcher)
- Jack Jumper (ARST, Sr, Pitcher)
- Kale Emshoff (LR, RS-Jr, Catcher)
- Kaleb DeLatorre (USA, Sr, First Base)
- Luke Drumheller (APP, So, Second Base)
- Hayden Cantrelle (LA, Jr, Shortstop)
- Garrett Scott (LR, RS-Sr, Third Base)
- Mason McWhorter (GASO, Sr, Outfielder)
- Ethan Wilson (USA, So, Outfielder)
- Rigsby Mosley (TROY, Jr, Outfielder)
- Will Hollis (TXST, Sr, Designated Hitter)
- Andrew Beesley (ULM, Sr, Utility)

== Personnel ==
=== Roster ===
2020 Georgia Southern Eagles roster
Pitchers: 8 Griffin Davis – Redshirt Sophomore; 14 Jared Szabo – Freshman; 16 Braden Hays – Sophomore; 17 Tyler Owens – Senior; 19 Sean Adams – Freshman; 21 Jonathan Edwards – Sophomore; 25 Nick Jones – Junior; 27 Rhett Gay – Junior; 26 Jay Thompson – Sophomore; 29 Tyler Jones – Junior; 33 Jordan Jackson – Junior; 34 Austin Kleinlein – Redshirt Sophomore; 35 Hayden Harris – Junior; 37 David Johnson – Junior; 39 Aaron Wainright – Freshman; 40 Jacob Parker – Redshirt Junior; 43 Connor Bruce – Freshman; 47 Jake Martin – Freshman	Catchers: 3 Chandler Davis – Sophomore; 5 Matt Anderson – Redshirt Senior; 9 JP Tighe – Sophomore; Infielders: 2 Jason Swan – Junior; 22 Austin Thompson – Junior; 23 Blake Evans – Sophomore; 28 Noah Ledford – Sophomore; 30 Steven Curry – Senior; 31 Mitchell Golden – Redshirt Junior; 38 Sam Blancato – Freshman; 42 Jack Eichler – Freshman; 44 Jarrett Brown – Freshman	Outfielders: 4 Mason McWhorter – Senior; 6 Noah Searcy – Junior; 7 Nolan Tressler – Junior; 11 Cody Shook – Redshirt Sophomore; 12 Parker Biederer – Junior; 41 Christian Avant – Junior

=== Coaching staff ===
2020 Georgia Southern Eagles coaching staff
- Rodney Hennon – Head Coach – 20th year
- B. J. Green – Assistant Head Coach/Pitching Coach – 10th year
- Alan Beck – Assistant Head Coach/Hitting Coach – 5th year
- Cody Wofford – Volunteer Assistant Coach – 2nd year

== Schedule and results ==
Legend
	Georgia Southern win
	Georgia Southern loss
	Postponement/Cancelation/Suspensions
**Bold**	Georgia Southern team member

2020 Georgia Southern Eagles baseball game log
Regular season (11–5)

February (4–5)
Date	Opponent	Rank	Site/stadium	Score	Win	Loss	Save	TV	Attendance	Overall record	SBC record
Feb. 14	Ball State		J. I. Clements Stadium • Statesboro, GA	**W** 6–0	**Jackson** (1–0)	Baker (0–1)	None		1,249	1–0	
Feb. 15	Ball State		J. I. Clements Stadium • Statesboro, GA	**W** 7–4	**Martin** (1–0)	Weatherly (0–1)	**Jones** (1)		863	2–0	
Feb. 15	Ball State		J. I. Clements Stadium • Statesboro, GA	**W** 16–0	**Johnson** (1–0)	Pachmayer (0–1)	None		772	3–0	
Feb. 16	Ball State		J. I. Clements Stadium • Statesboro, GA	Game canceled due to inclement weather							
Feb. 18	No. 19 Georgia Tech		J. I. Clements Stadium • Statesboro, GA	**L** 3–4	Crawford (1–0)	**Harris** (0–1)	None		737	3–1	
Feb. 22	at No. 21 East Carolina		Clark–LeClair Stadium • Greenville, NC	**L** 0–3	Burleson (1–0)	**Jackson** (1–1)	Bridges (1)		3,055	3–2	
Feb. 23	at No. 21 East Carolina		Clark–LeClair Stadium • Greenville, NC	**L** 2–3	Mayhue (1–0)	**Hays** (0–1)	Giles (1)			3–3	
Feb. 23	at No. 21 East Carolina		Clark–LeClair Stadium • Greenville, NC	**L** 2–10	Kuchmaner (2–0)	**Johnson** (1–1)	None		3,338	3–4	
Feb. 28	Radford		J. I. Clements Stadium • Statesboro, GA	**W** 8–0	**Jackson** (2–1)	Williams (0–2)	None		537	4–4	
Feb. 29	Radford		J. I. Clements Stadium • Statesboro, GA	**L** 2–4	Sande (1–1)	**Hays** (0–2)	Hudson (3)		891	4–5	

March (7–0)
Date	Opponent	Rank	Site/stadium	Score	Win	Loss	Save	TV	Attendance	Overall record	SBC record
Mar. 1	Radford		J. I. Clements Stadium • Statesboro, GA	**W** 19–2	**Harris** (1–1)	Donovan (1–2)	None		739	5–5	
Mar. 3	at No. 4 Georgia		Foley Field • Athens, GA	**W** 6–3	**Owens** (1–0)	Brown (1–1)	None		2,195	6–5	
Mar. 6	Valparaiso		J. I. Clements Stadium • Statesboro, GA	**W** 8–1	**Jackson** (3–1)	Mintz (0–2)	None		637	7–5	
Mar. 7	Valparaiso		J. I. Clements Stadium • Statesboro, GA	**W** 1–0	**Harris** (2–1)	Turzenski (0–2)	None		1,097	8–5	
Mar. 8	Valparaiso		J. I. Clements Stadium • Statesboro, GA	**W** 12–0	**Johnson** (2–1)	Fields (0–4)	None		653	9–5	
Mar. 10	vs. No. 3 Georgia		SRP Park • North Augusta, GA	**W** 1–0	**Parker** (1–0)	Smith (0–1)	**Harris** (1)		4,950	10–5	
Mar. 11	No. 3 Georgia		J. I. Clements Stadium • Statesboro, GA	**W** 6–4	**Owens** (2–0)	Brown (1–2)	None		3,286	11–5	
Mar. 13	Troy		J. I. Clements Stadium • Statesboro, GA	Season suspended due to COVID-19 pandemic							
Mar. 14	Troy		J. I. Clements Stadium • Statesboro, GA	Season suspended due to COVID-19 pandemic							
Mar. 15	Troy		J. I. Clements Stadium • Statesboro, GA	Season suspended due to COVID-19 pandemic							
Mar. 18	at Georgia Tech		Russ Chandler Stadium • Atlanta, GA	Season suspended due to COVID-19 pandemic							
Mar. 20	at South Alabama		Riddle–Pace Field • Mobile, AL	Season suspended due to COVID-19 pandemic							
Mar. 21	at South Alabama		Riddle–Pace Field • Mobile, AL	Season suspended due to COVID-19 pandemic							
Mar. 22	at South Alabama		Riddle–Pace Field • Mobile, AL	Season suspended due to COVID-19 pandemic							
Mar. 25	at College of Charleston		CofC Baseball Stadium at Patriots Point • Charleston, SC	Season suspended due to COVID-19 pandemic							
Mar. 27	Louisiana–Monroe		J. I. Clements Stadium • Statesboro, GA	Season suspended due to COVID-19 pandemic							
Mar. 28	Louisiana–Monroe		J. I. Clements Stadium • Statesboro, GA	Season suspended due to COVID-19 pandemic							
Mar. 29	Louisiana–Monroe		J. I. Clements Stadium • Statesboro, GA	Season suspended due to COVID-19 pandemic							

April (0–0)
Date	Opponent	Rank	Site/stadium	Score	Win	Loss	Save	TV	Attendance	Overall record	SBC record
Apr. 1	at Tennessee		Lindsey Nelson Stadium • Knoxville, TN	Season suspended due to COVID-19 pandemic							
Apr. 3	at Appalachian State		Beaver Field at Jim and Bettie Smith Stadium • Boone, NC	Season suspended due to COVID-19 pandemic							
Apr. 4	at Appalachian State		Beaver Field at Jim and Bettie Smith Stadium • Boone, NC	Season suspended due to COVID-19 pandemic							
Apr. 5	at Appalachian State		Beaver Field at Jim and Bettie Smith Stadium • Boone, NC	Season suspended due to COVID-19 pandemic							
Apr. 7	at Mercer		Claude Smith Field • Macon, GA	Season suspended due to COVID-19 pandemic							
Apr. 9	Coastal Carolina		J. I. Clements Stadium • Statesboro, GA	Season suspended due to COVID-19 pandemic							
Apr. 10	Coastal Carolina		J. I. Clements Stadium • Statesboro, GA	Season suspended due to COVID-19 pandemic							
Apr. 11	Coastal Carolina Chanticleers		J. I. Clements Stadium • Statesboro, GA	Season suspended due to COVID-19 pandemic							
Apr. 13	Mercer		J. I. Clements Stadium • Statesboro, GA	Season suspended due to COVID-19 pandemic							
Apr. 14	at Presbyterian		Presbyterian Baseball Complex • Clinton, SC	Season suspended due to COVID-19 pandemic							
Apr. 17	at Arkansas State		Tomlinson Stadium–Kell Field • Jonesboro, AR	Season suspended due to COVID-19 pandemic							
Apr. 18	at Arkansas State		Tomlinson Stadium–Kell Field • Jonesboro, AR	Season suspended due to COVID-19 pandemic							
Apr. 19	at Arkansas State		Tomlinson Stadium–Kell Field • Jonesboro, AR	Season suspended due to COVID-19 pandemic							
Apr. 21	College of Charleston		J. I. Clements Stadium • Statesboro, GA	Season suspended due to COVID-19 pandemic							
Apr. 22	vs. Kennesaw State		Grayson Stadium • Savannah, GA	Season suspended due to COVID-19 pandemic							
Apr. 24	UT Arlington		J. I. Clements Stadium • Statesboro, GA	Season suspended due to COVID-19 pandemic							
Apr. 25	UT Arlington		J. I. Clements Stadium • Statesboro, GA	Season suspended due to COVID-19 pandemic							
Apr. 26	UT Arlington		J. I. Clements Stadium • Statesboro, GA	Season suspended due to COVID-19 pandemic							

May (0–0)
Date	Opponent	Rank	Site/stadium	Score	Win	Loss	Save	TV	Attendance	Overall record	SBC record
May 1	at Louisiana		M. L. Tigue Moore Field at Russo Park • Lafayette, LA	Season suspended due to COVID-19 pandemic							
May 2	at Louisiana		M. L. Tigue Moore Field at Russo Park • Lafayette, LA	Season suspended due to COVID-19 pandemic							
May 3	at Louisiana		M. L. Tigue Moore Field at Russo Park • Lafayette, LA	Season suspended due to COVID-19 pandemic							
May 8	at Texas State		Bobcat Ballpark • San Marcos, TX	Season suspended due to COVID-19 pandemic							
May 9	at Texas State		Bobcat Ballpark • San Marcos, TX	Season suspended due to COVID-19 pandemic							
May 10	at Texas State		Bobcat Ballpark • San Marcos, TX	Season suspended due to COVID-19 pandemic							
May 12	at Kennesaw State		Fred Stillwell Stadium • Kennesaw, GA	Season suspended due to COVID-19 pandemic							
May 14	Georgia State		J. I. Clements Stadium • Statesboro, GA	Season suspended due to COVID-19 pandemic							
May 15	Georgia State		J. I. Clements Stadium • Statesboro, GA	Season suspended due to COVID-19 pandemic							
May 16	Georgia State		J. I. Clements Stadium • Statesboro, GA	Season suspended due to COVID-19 pandemic							

Postseason (0–0)

SBC Tournament (0–0)
Date	Opponent	Seed/Rank	Site/stadium	Score	Win	Loss	Save	TV	Attendance	Overall record	SBC record
May 20			Montgomery Riverwalk Stadium • Montgomery, AL	Tournament canceled due to COVID-19 pandemic							

Schedule source:

*Rankings are based on the team's current ranking in the D1Baseball poll.
