= 2020 Little Rock Trojans baseball team =

American college baseball season

2020 Little Rock Trojans baseball
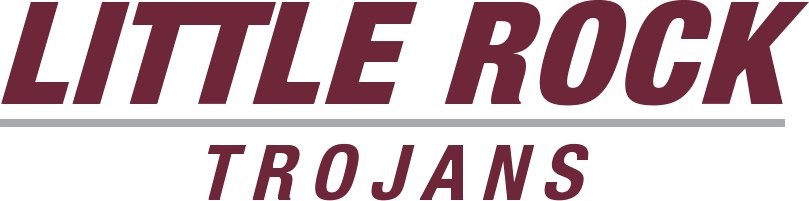
- Conference: Sun Belt Conference
- West Division
- Record: 9–8 (0–0 SBC)
- Head coach: Chris Curry (6th season)
- Assistant coaches: Noah Sanders; R. D. Spiehs
- Home stadium: Gary Hogan Field

2020 Sun Belt Conference baseball standings
	Conf.				Overall
Team	W		L	PCT	W		L	PCT
East Division
Coastal Carolina ‍‍‍	0	–	0	–	11	–	5	.688
Georgia Southern ‍‍‍	0	–	0	–	11	–	5	.688
Appalachian State ‍‍‍	0	–	0	–	11	–	6	.647
Georgia State ‍‍‍	0	–	0	–	9	–	7	.563
Troy ‍‍‍	0	–	0	–	9	–	8	.529
South Alabama ‍‍‍	0	–	0	–	8	–	10	.444
West Division
Texas State ‍‍‍	0	–	0	–	14	–	4	.778
UT Arlington ‍‍‍	0	–	0	–	12	–	4	.750
Louisiana–Monroe ‍‍‍	0	–	0	–	12	–	5	.706
Little Rock ‍‍‍	0	–	0	–	9	–	8	.529
Louisiana ‍‍‍	0	–	0	–	8	–	9	.471
Arkansas State ‍‍‍	0	–	0	–	7	–	9	.438
x – Division champion ‡ – Tournament champion y – Invited to the NCAA tournament As of March 12, 2020; Rankings from D1Baseball

The 2020 Little Rock Trojans baseball team represented the University of Arkansas at Little Rock during the 2020 NCAA Division I baseball season. The Trojans played their home games at Gary Hogan Field and were led by sixth year head coach Chris Curry. They were members of the Sun Belt Conference.

== Preseason ==
=== Signing Day Recruits ===
Player	Hometown	Previous Team
Pitchers
Matthew Davis	Selma, Alabama	Morgan Academy
Mason Hilton	Weatherford, Texas	McLennan CC
Zane Neves	Jonesboro, Arkansas	St. Johns River State
Sawyer Smallwood	Texarkana, Texas	Northeast Texas CC
Chance Vaught	Mobile, Alabama	Mobile Christian
Jacob Weatherley	Jonesboro, Arkansas	Jonesboro HS
Hitters
Bryan Muniz	Orange Park, Florida	Calvary Christian
Austin Scritchfield	Cabot, Arkansas	Cabot HS

=== Sun Belt Conference Coaches Poll ===
The Sun Belt Conference Coaches Poll was released on January 30, 2020 and the Trojans were picked to finish fourth in the West Division.

Coaches poll (West)
Predicted finish	Team	Votes (1st place)
1	UT Arlington	58 (3)
2	Louisiana	57 (5)
3	Texas State	55 (3)
4	Little Rock	39 (1)
5	Louisiana–Monroe	25
6	Arkansas State	18

=== Preseason All-Sun Belt Team & Honors ===
- Drake Nightengale (USA, Sr, Pitcher)
- Zach McCambley (CCU, Jr, Pitcher)
- Levi Thomas (TROY, Jr, Pitcher)
- Andrew Papp (APP, Sr, Pitcher)
- Jack Jumper (ARST, Sr, Pitcher)
- Kale Emshoff (LR, RS-Jr, Catcher)
- Kaleb DeLatorre (USA, Sr, First Base)
- Luke Drumheller (APP, So, Second Base)
- Hayden Cantrelle (LA, Jr, Shortstop)
- Garrett Scott (LR, RS-Sr, Third Base)
- Mason McWhorter (GASO, Sr, Outfielder)
- Ethan Wilson (USA, So, Outfielder)
- Rigsby Mosley (TROY, Jr, Outfielder)
- Will Hollis (TXST, Sr, Designated Hitter)
- Andrew Beesley (ULM, Sr, Utility)

== Roster ==
2020 Little Rock Trojans roster
Pitchers: 10 Keegan Westbrook - Junior; 14 Eli Sievert - Senior; 16 Alec Benavides - Redshirt Junior; 17 Aaron Funk - Junior; 18 Calvin Hunt - Freshman; 25 Jose Torres - Redshirt Senior; 26 Cal Beardsley - Junior; 27 Luke Wallner - Junior; 30 Hayden Arnold - Junior; 34 Dillon Delgadillo - Senior; 36 Austin Smith - Junior; 37 Erik McKnight - Freshman; 40 Ty Gordon - Redshirt Junior; 44 Cole Evans - Junior	Catchers: 7 Josh Nowak - Senior; 23 Kale Emshoff - Redshirt Junior; 24 Houston Parker - Junior; 28 John Michael Russ - Junior; 29 Ramon Padilla - Senior; Infielders: 1 Christian Bernabe - Freshman; 2 Eldridge Figueroa - Junior; 4 Ty Riche - Junior; 5 Miguel Soto - Sophomore; 6 Nathan Lyons - Sophomore; 9 Will Spears - Freshman; 12 Reed Shephard - Junior; 21 Jorden Hussein - Junior; 22 Garrett Scott - Redshirt Senior; 31 Tucker Childers - Redshirt Junior; 33 Kobe Barnum - Junior; Outfielders: 8 Tim Dixon - Junior; 13 Tyler Williams - Freshman; 20 Kenny Rodriguez - Junior

=== Coaching staff ===
2020 Little Rock Trojans coaching staff
- Chris Curry – Head Coach – 6th year
- Noah Sanders – Assistant Head Coach and Recruiting Coordinator – 3rd year
- R. D. Spiehs – Assistant Head Coach – 2nd year
- Nick Piraino – Director of Operations/Player Development – 1st year
- Jacob Caples – Volunteer Assistant Coach

== Schedule and results ==
Legend
	Little Rock win
	Little Rock loss
	Postponement/Cancelation/Suspensions
**Bold**	Little Rock team member

2020 Little Rock Trojans baseball game log
Regular season (9-8)

February (7-5)
Date	Opponent	Rank	Site/stadium	Score	Win	Loss	Save	TV	Attendance	Overall record	SBC record
Feb. 14	Illinois State		Gary Hogan Field • Little Rock, AR	**W** 6-0	**Arnold** (1-0)	Johnson (0-1)	**Torres** (1)		257	1-0	
Feb. 15	Illinois State		Gary Hogan Field • Little Rock, AR	**W** 7-6	**Smith** (1-0)	Gilmore (0-1)	None		239	2-0	
Feb. 16	Illinois State		Gary Hogan Field • Little Rock, AR	**L** 2-4	Salata (1-0)	**Torres** (0-1)	Huffmanm (1)		312	2-1	
Feb. 19	Grambling State		Gary Hogan Field • Little Rock, AR	**W** 6-4	**Delgadillo** (1-0)	Peters (0-1)	None		125	3-1	
Feb. 21	at Nicholls		Ben Meyer Diamond at Ray E. Didier Field • Thibodaux, LA	**W** 8-6 (10 inns)	**Torres** (1-1)	Balado (0-2)	None	YouTube	277	4-1	
Feb. 22	vs. McNeese State		Ben Meyer Diamond at Ray E. Didier Field • Thibodaux, LA	**L** 2-14 (7 inns)	Dion (2-0)	Sievert (0-1)	None		123	4-2	
Feb. 22	at Nicholls		Ben Meyer Diamond at Ray E. Didier Field • Thibodaux, LA	**W** 11-2	**Smith** (2-0)	Evans (0-1)	None		237	5-2	
Feb. 23	vs. Southern		Ben Meyer Diamond at Ray E. Didier Field • Thibodaux, LA	**W** 7-4	**Evans** (1-0)	Allen (1-3)	None		77	6-2	
Feb. 25	at Oklahoma State		O'Brate Stadium • Stillwater, OK	**L** 1-9	Bowman (1-0)	**Beardsley** (0-1)	None	ESPN+	462	6-3	
Feb. 26	at Oklahoma State		O'Brate Stadium • Stillwater, OK	**L** 0-12 (7 inn)	Varela (2-0)	**Smith** (2-1)	None		188	6-4	
Feb. 28	North Alabama		Gary Hogan Field • Little Rock, AR	**L** 4-8	Davidson (1-2)	**Arnold** (1-1)	None		225	6-5	
Feb. 29	North Alabama		Gary Hogan Field • Little Rock, AR	**W** 7-3	**Sievert** (1-1)	Laws (0-2)	**Evans** (1)		176	7-5	

March (2-3)
Date	Opponent	Rank	Site/stadium	Score	Win	Loss	Save	TV	Attendance	Overall record	SBC record
Mar. 1	North Alabama		Gary Hogan Field • Little Rock, AR	**W** 2-1	**Funk** (1-0)	Best (1-2)	None		235	8-5	
Mar. 3	at Oral Roberts		J. L. Johnson Stadium • Tulsa, OK	**L** 3-4 (11 inns)	Swift (2-0)	**Delgadillo** (1-1)	None		612	8-6	
Mar. 6	at Southern Miss		Pete Taylor Park • Hattiesburg, MS	**L** 4-11	Powell (3-0)	**Sievert** (1-2)	None		3,667	8-7	
Mar. 7	at Southern Miss		Pete Taylor Park • Hattiesburg, MS	**L** 1-4	Ethridge (3-0)	**Wallner** (0-1)	Stanley (2)		3,920	8-8	
Mar. 8	at Southern Miss		Pete Taylor Park • Hattiesburg, MS	**W** 5-1	**Funk** (2-0)	Best (0-2)	None		3,776	9-8	
Mar. 13	UT Arlington		Gary Hogan Field • Little Rock, AR	Season suspended due to COVID-19 pandemic							
Mar. 14	UT Arlington		Gary Hogan Field • Little Rock, AR	Season suspended due to COVID-19 pandemic							
Mar. 15	UT Arlington		Gary Hogan Field • Little Rock, AR	Season suspended due to COVID-19 pandemic							
Mar. 17	Mississippi Valley State		Gary Hogan Field • Little Rock, AR	Season suspended due to COVID-19 pandemic							
Mar. 18	Mississippi Valley State		Gary Hogan Field • Little Rock, AR	Season suspended due to COVID-19 pandemic							
Mar. 20	at Troy		Riddle–Pace Field • Troy, AL	Season suspended due to COVID-19 pandemic							
Mar. 21	at Troy		Riddle–Pace Field • Troy, AL	Season suspended due to COVID-19 pandemic							
Mar. 22	at Troy		Riddle–Pace Field • Troy, AL	Season suspended due to COVID-19 pandemic							
Mar. 24	Arkansas–Pine Bluff		Gary Hogan Field • Little Rock, AR	Season suspended due to COVID-19 pandemic							
Mar. 27	Appalachian State		Gary Hogan Field • Little Rock, AR	Season suspended due to COVID-19 pandemic							
Mar. 28	Appalachian State		Gary Hogan Field • Little Rock, AR	Season suspended due to COVID-19 pandemic							
Mar. 29	Appalachian State		Gary Hogan Field • Little Rock, AR	Season suspended due to COVID-19 pandemic							

April (0-0)
Date	Opponent	Rank	Site/stadium	Score	Win	Loss	Save	TV	Attendance	Overall record	SBC record
Apr. 3	at Georgia State		Georgia State Baseball Complex • Decatur, GA	Season suspended due to COVID-19 pandemic							
Apr. 4	at Georgia State		Georgia State Baseball Complex • Decatur, GA	Season suspended due to COVID-19 pandemic							
Apr. 5	at Georgia State		Georgia State Baseball Complex • Decatur, GA	Season suspended due to COVID-19 pandemic							
Apr. 7	at No. 14 Arkansas		Baum–Walker Stadium • Fayetteville, AR	Season suspended due to COVID-19 pandemic							
Apr. 9	Louisiana–Monroe		Gary Hogan Field • Little Rock, AR	Season suspended due to COVID-19 pandemic							
Apr. 10	Louisiana–Monroe		Gary Hogan Field • Little Rock, AR	Season suspended due to COVID-19 pandemic							
Apr. 11	Louisiana–Monroe		Gary Hogan Field • Little Rock, AR	Season suspended due to COVID-19 pandemic							
Apr. 14	at Central Arkansas		Bear Stadium • Conway, AR	Season suspended due to COVID-19 pandemic							
Apr. 17	at Louisiana		M. L. Tigue Moore Field at Russo Park • Lafayette, LA	Season suspended due to COVID-19 pandemic							
Apr. 18	at Louisiana		M. L. Tigue Moore Field at Russo Park • Lafayette, LA	Season suspended due to COVID-19 pandemic							
Apr. 19	at Louisiana		M. L. Tigue Moore Field at Russo Park • Lafayette, LA	Season suspended due to COVID-19 pandemic							
Apr. 21	Central Arkansas		Gary Hogan Field • Little Rock, AR	Season suspended due to COVID-19 pandemic							
Apr. 24	at Texas State		Bobcat Ballpark • San Marcos, TX	Season suspended due to COVID-19 pandemic							
Apr. 25	at Texas State		Bobcat Ballpark • San Marcos, TX	Season suspended due to COVID-19 pandemic							
Apr. 26	at Texas State		Bobcat Ballpark • San Marcos, TX	Season suspended due to COVID-19 pandemic							
Apr. 28	at Grambling State		Ralph Waldo Emerson Jones Park and Wilbert Ellis Field • Grambling, LA	Season suspended due to COVID-19 pandemic							

May (0–0)
Date	Opponent	Rank	Site/stadium	Score	Win	Loss	Save	TV	Attendance	Overall record	SBC record
May 1	South Alabama		Gary Hogan Field • Little Rock, AR	Season suspended due to COVID-19 pandemic							
May 2	South Alabama		Gary Hogan Field • Little Rock, AR	Season suspended due to COVID-19 pandemic							
May 3	South Alabama		Gary Hogan Field • Little Rock, AR	Season suspended due to COVID-19 pandemic							
May 5	vs. Central Arkansas		Dickey–Stephens Park • North Little Rock, AR	Season suspended due to COVID-19 pandemic							
May 8	at Coastal Carolina		Springs Brooks Stadium • Conway, SC	Season suspended due to COVID-19 pandemic							
May 9	at Coastal Carolina		Springs Brooks Stadium • Conway, SC	Season suspended due to COVID-19 pandemic							
May 10	at Coastal Carolina		Springs Brooks Stadium • Conway, SC	Season suspended due to COVID-19 pandemic							
May 14	Arkansas State		Gary Hogan Field • Little Rock, AR	Season suspended due to COVID-19 pandemic							
May 15	Arkansas State		Gary Hogan Field • Little Rock, AR	Season suspended due to COVID-19 pandemic							
May 16	Arkansas State		Gary Hogan Field • Little Rock, AR	Season suspended due to COVID-19 pandemic							

Postseason (0–0)

SBC Tournament (0–0)
Date	Opponent	Seed/Rank	Site/stadium	Score	Win	Loss	Save	TV	Attendance	Overall record	SBC record
May 20			Montgomery Riverwalk Stadium • Montgomery, AL	Championship Series suspended due to COVID-19 pandemic							

Schedule source:

*Rankings are based on the team's current ranking in the D1Baseball poll.
