= 2020 Louisiana–Monroe Warhawks baseball team =

American college baseball season

2020 Louisiana–Monroe Warhawks baseball
- Conference: Sun Belt Conference
- West Division
- Record: 12–5 (0–0 SBC)
- Head coach: Michael Federico (3rd season)
- Assistant coaches: Matt Collins; Jake Carlson; Brandon Belanger
- Home stadium: Warhawk Field

2020 Sun Belt Conference baseball standings
	Conf.				Overall
Team	W		L	PCT	W		L	PCT
East Division
Coastal Carolina ‍‍‍	0	–	0	–	11	–	5	.688
Georgia Southern ‍‍‍	0	–	0	–	11	–	5	.688
Appalachian State ‍‍‍	0	–	0	–	11	–	6	.647
Georgia State ‍‍‍	0	–	0	–	9	–	7	.563
Troy ‍‍‍	0	–	0	–	9	–	8	.529
South Alabama ‍‍‍	0	–	0	–	8	–	10	.444
West Division
Texas State ‍‍‍	0	–	0	–	14	–	4	.778
UT Arlington ‍‍‍	0	–	0	–	12	–	4	.750
Louisiana–Monroe ‍‍‍	0	–	0	–	12	–	5	.706
Little Rock ‍‍‍	0	–	0	–	9	–	8	.529
Louisiana ‍‍‍	0	–	0	–	8	–	9	.471
Arkansas State ‍‍‍	0	–	0	–	7	–	9	.438
x – Division champion ‡ – Tournament champion y – Invited to the NCAA tournament As of March 12, 2020; Rankings from D1Baseball

The 2020 Louisiana–Monroe Warhawks baseball team represented the University of Louisiana at Monroe during the 2020 NCAA Division I baseball season. The Warhawks played their home games at Warhawk Field and were led by third year head coach Michael Federico. They were members of the Sun Belt Conference.

On March 12, the Sun Belt Conference announced the indefinite suspension of all spring athletics, including baseball, due to the increasing risk of the COVID-19 pandemic. Soon after, the Sun Belt cancelled all season and postseason play.

== Preseason ==
=== Signing Day Recruits ===
Player	Hometown	Previous Team
Pitchers
Austin Adair	Pflugerville, Texas	Hendrickson HS
Cole Cressend	Mandeville, Louisiana	Mandeville HS
Reid Goleman	Moselle, Mississippi	Pearl River CC
Trey Lindsey	Carthage, Texas	Panola College
Steve Owings III	Bixby, Oklahoma	Northern Oklahoma–Enid
Henry Shuffler	Cade, Louisiana	Episcopal of Acadiana
Jonathan Snuggs	Monroe, Louisiana	Mississippi Delta CC
Adam Tubbs	Sterlington, Louisiana	Sterlington HS
Hitters
Matthew Lee	Baton Rouge, Louisiana	Catholic HS
Britt McKay	McHenry, Mississippi	Pearl River CC
Chris Noble	Shreveport, Louisiana	Hutchinson CC
Cole Stromboe	River Ridge, Louisiana	Brother Martin HS
Travis Washburn	Conroe, Texas	Navarro College
Jakob Wax	Baton Rouge, Louisiana	Catholic HS

=== Sun Belt Conference Coaches Poll ===
The Sun Belt Conference Coaches Poll was released on January 30, 2020, and the Warhawks were picked to finish fifth in the West Division with 25 total votes.

Coaches poll (West)
Predicted finish	Team	Votes (1st place)
1	UT Arlington	58 (3)
2	Louisiana	57 (5)
3	Texas State	55 (3)
4	Little Rock	39 (1)
5	Louisiana–Monroe	25
6	Arkansas State	18

=== Preseason All-Sun Belt Team & Honors ===
- Drake Nightengale (USA Sr, Pitcher)
- Zach McCambley (CCU Jr, Pitcher)
- Levi Thomas (TROY Jr, Pitcher)
- Andrew Papp (APP Sr, Pitcher)
- Jack Jumper (ARST Sr, Pitcher)
- Kale Emshoff (LR, RS-Jr, Catcher)
- Kaleb DeLatorre (USA Sr, First Base)
- Luke Drumheller (APP, So, Second Base)
- Hayden Cantrelle (LA Jr, Shortstop)
- Garrett Scott (LR, RS-Sr, Third Base)
- Mason McWhorter (GASO Sr, Outfielder)
- Ethan Wilson (USA, So, Outfielder)
- Rigsby Mosley (TROY Jr, Outfielder)
- Will Hollis (TXST Sr, Designated Hitter)
- Andrew Beesley (ULM Sr, Utility)

== Roster ==
2020 Louisiana–Monroe Warhawks roster
Pitchers: 1 Logan McDowell - Senior; 18 Cole Martin - Senior; 19 Lucas Wepf - Junior; 21 Ty Barnes - Senior; 25 Brock Figueroa - Redshirt Junior; 26 Bryson Wrobel - Junior; 28 Ben Holbert - Freshman; 30 Connor Deeds - Senior; 32 Tyler Lien - Redshirt Junior; 34 Dylan Marsh - Senior; 35 Kayleb Sanderson - Senior; 36 Eric Heiman - Junior; 37 Landon Longsworth - Senior; 38 Austin Booth - Junior; 42 Nicholas Judice - Freshman; 44 Andre Beaudoin - Freshman; 47 Cam Barlow - Redshirt Freshman; 50 Justin Barton - Redshirt Senior	Catchers: 23 Carson Klepzig - Redshirt Senior; 33 Logan Wurm - Senior; Infielders: 2 Colin Gordon - Senior; 4 Nathan Miranda - Senior; 5 Michael Cervantes - Freshman; 9 Colby Deaville - Junior; 10 Grant Schulz - Junior; 16 Cameron Horton - Senior; 22 Wiley Cleland - Junior; 29 Danny Desimone - Junior; Outfielders: 3 Andrew Beesley - Senior; 7 Ryan Humeniuk - Senior; 11 Trace Henry - Junior; 20 Mason Holt - Junior; 40 Marcus Derbonne - Freshman; 45 Ryan Cupit - Junior

=== Coaching staff ===
2020 Louisiana–Monroe Warhawks coaching staff
- Michael Federico – Head Coach – 3rd year
- Matt Collins – Assistant Head Coach – 5th year
- Jake Carlson – Assistant Head Coach/Recruiting Coordinator – 2nd year
- Brandon Belanger – Assistant Coach – 3rd year

== Schedule and results ==
Legend
	Louisiana–Monroe win
	Louisiana–Monroe loss
	Postponement/Cancelation/Suspensions
**Bold**	Louisiana–Monroe team member

2020 Louisiana–Monroe Warhawks baseball game log
Regular season (12–5)

February (8–2)
Date	Opponent	Rank	Site/stadium	Score	Win	Loss	Save	TV	Attendance	Overall record	SBC record
Feb. 14	Southeast Missouri State		Warhawk Field • Monroe, LA	**W** 5-1	**Barnes** (1–0)	Dodd (0–1)	**Deeds** (1)		875	1-0	
Feb. 15	Southeast Missouri State		Warhawk Field • Monroe, LA	**W** 13-4	**Barlow** (1–0)	Hojnacki (0–1)	None		908	2-0	
Feb. 16	Southeast Missouri State		Warhawk Field • Monroe, LA	**L** 2-6	Niznik (1–0)	**Sanderson** (0–1)	None		885	2-1	
Feb. 18	at Northwestern State		H. Alvin Brown–C. C. Stroud Field • Natchitoches, LA	Postponed							
Feb. 21	Grambling State		Warhawk Field • Monroe, LA	**W** 15-0	**Barnes** (2–0)	Delgado (1-1)	None		701	3-1	
Feb. 22	Grambling State		Warhawk Field • Monroe, LA	**W** 7-6	**Barton** (1–0)	Bonilla (0–1)	**Longsworth** (1)		614	4-1	
Feb. 23	Grambling State		Warhawk Field • Monroe, LA	**W** 23-12	**Figueroa** (1–0)	Alvarez (0–1)	None		821	5-1	
Feb. 25	Southeastern Louisiana		Warhawk Field • Monroe, LA	**W** 8-4	**Lien** (1–0)	Dugas (0–2)	**Longsworth** (2)		871	6-1	
Feb. 26	Southeastern Louisiana		Warhawk Field • Monroe, LA	**W** 23-5 (5 inn)	**Marsh** (1–0)	Aspholm (0–1)	None		758	7-1	
Feb. 28	Illinois State		Warhawk Field • Monroe, LA	**L** 3-6	Johnson (1–2)	**Barnes** (2–1)	Kubiatowicz (1)		689	7-2	
Feb. 29	Illinois State		Warhawk Field • Monroe, LA	**W** 26-8	**Barton** (2–0)	Sebby (1-1)	None		1,069	8-2	

March (4–3)
Date	Opponent	Rank	Site/stadium	Score	Win	Loss	Save	TV	Attendance	Overall record	SBC record
Mar. 1	Illinois State		Warhawk Field • Monroe, LA	**W** 4-2	**Judice** (1–0)	Sinisko (0–1)	**Longsworth** (3)		723	9-2	
Mar. 3	Jackson State		Warhawk Field • Monroe, LA	**W** 2-0	**Lien** (2–0)	Valentin (1-1)	**Longsworth** (4)		720	10-2	
Mar. 6	at McNeese State		Joe Miller Ballpark • Lake Charles, LA	**W** 8-2	**Barnes** (3–1)	Dion (2-2)	**Deeds** (2)		766	10-2	
Mar. 7	at McNeese State		Joe Miller Ballpark • Lake Charles, LA	**W** 5-3	**Barlow** (2–0)	Breaux (1–2)	**Figueroa** (1)		896	11-2	
Mar. 8	at McNeese State		Joe Miller Ballpark • Lake Charles, LA	**L** 1-3	Foster (1–0)	**Sanderson** (0–2)	Reeves (2)		914	11-3	
Mar. 10	No. 8 Ole Miss		Warhawk Field • Monroe, LA	**L** 3-6	Broadway (2–0)	**Deeds** (0–1)	Forsyth (5)		2,129	11-4	
Mar. 11	No. 8 Ole Miss		Warhawk Field • Monroe, LA	**L** 7-18	Kimbrell (2–0)	**Judice** (1-1)	None		2,295	11-5	
Mar. 13	Arkansas State		Warhawk Field • Monroe, LA	Season suspended due to COVID-19 pandemic							
Mar. 14	Arkansas State		Warhawk Field • Monroe, LA	Season suspended due to COVID-19 pandemic							
Mar. 15	Arkansas State		Warhawk Field • Monroe, LA	Season suspended due to COVID-19 pandemic							
Mar. 17	Stephen F. Austin		Warhawk Field • Monroe, LA	Season suspended due to COVID-19 pandemic							
Mar. 20	at Coastal Carolina		Springs Brooks Stadium • Conway, SC	Season suspended due to COVID-19 pandemic							
Mar. 21	at Coastal Carolina		Springs Brooks Stadium • Conway, SC	Season suspended due to COVID-19 pandemic							
Mar. 22	at Coastal Carolina		Springs Brooks Stadium • Conway, SC	Season suspended due to COVID-19 pandemic							
Mar. 27	at Georgia Southern		J. I. Clements Stadium • Statesboro, GA	Season suspended due to COVID-19 pandemic							
Mar. 28	at Georgia Southern		J. I. Clements Stadium • Statesboro, GA	Season suspended due to COVID-19 pandemic							
Mar. 29	at Georgia Southern		J. I. Clements Stadium • Statesboro, GA	Season suspended due to COVID-19 pandemic							
Mar. 31	at No. 19 LSU		Alex Box Stadium, Skip Bertman Field • Baton Rouge, LA	Season suspended due to COVID-19 pandemic							

April (0-0)
Date	Opponent	Rank	Site/stadium	Score	Win	Loss	Save	TV	Attendance	Overall record	SBC record
Apr. 3	Texas State		Warhawk Field • Monroe, LA	Season suspended due to COVID-19 pandemic							
Apr. 4	Texas State		Warhawk Field • Monroe, LA	Season suspended due to COVID-19 pandemic							
Apr. 5	Texas State		Warhawk Field • Monroe, LA	Season suspended due to COVID-19 pandemic							
Apr. 7	Louisiana Tech		Warhawk Field • Monroe, LA	Season suspended due to COVID-19 pandemic							
Apr. 9	at Little Rock		Gary Hogan Field • Little Rock, AR	Season suspended due to COVID-19 pandemic							
Apr. 10	at Little Rock		Gary Hogan Field • Little Rock, AR	Season suspended due to COVID-19 pandemic							
Apr. 11	at Little Rock		Gary Hogan Field • Little Rock, AR	Season suspended due to COVID-19 pandemic							
Apr. 14	at Southern Miss		Pete Taylor Park • Hattiesburg, MS	Season suspended due to COVID-19 pandemic							
Apr. 17	South Alabama		Warhawk Field • Monroe, LA	Season suspended due to COVID-19 pandemic							
Apr. 18	South Alabama		Warhawk Field • Monroe, LA	Season suspended due to COVID-19 pandemic							
Apr. 19	South Alabama		Warhawk Field • Monroe, LA	Season suspended due to COVID-19 pandemic							
Apr. 21	Northwestern State		Warhawk Field • Monroe, LA	Season suspended due to COVID-19 pandemic							
Apr. 22	at Northwestern State		H. Alvin Brown–C. C. Stroud Field • Natchitoches, LA	Season suspended due to COVID-19 pandemic							
Apr. 24	Appalachian State		Warhawk Field • Monroe, LA	Season suspended due to COVID-19 pandemic							
Apr. 25	Appalachian State		Warhawk Field • Monroe, LA	Season suspended due to COVID-19 pandemic							
Apr. 26	Appalachian State		Warhawk Field • Monroe, LA	Season suspended due to COVID-19 pandemic							
Apr. 29	at Jackson State		Braddy Field • Jackson, MS	Season suspended due to COVID-19 pandemic							

May (0–0)
Date	Opponent	Rank	Site/stadium	Score	Win	Loss	Save	TV	Attendance	Overall record	SBC record
May 1	at UT Arlington		Clay Gould Ballpark • Arlington, TX	Season suspended due to COVID-19 pandemic							
May 2	at UT Arlington		Clay Gould Ballpark • Arlington, TX	Season suspended due to COVID-19 pandemic							
May 3	at UT Arlington		Clay Gould Ballpark • Arlington, TX	Season suspended due to COVID-19 pandemic							
May 8	Troy		Warhawk Field • Monroe, LA	Season suspended due to COVID-19 pandemic							
May 9	Troy		Warhawk Field • Monroe, LA	Season suspended due to COVID-19 pandemic							
May 10	Troy		Warhawk Field • Monroe, LA	Season suspended due to COVID-19 pandemic							
May 12	Louisiana Tech		Warhawk Field • Monroe, LA	Season suspended due to COVID-19 pandemic							
May 14	at Louisiana		M. L. Tigue Moore Field at Russo Park • Lafayette, LA	Season suspended due to COVID-19 pandemic							
May 15	at Louisiana		M. L. Tigue Moore Field at Russo Park • Lafayette, LA	Season suspended due to COVID-19 pandemic							
May 16	at Louisiana		M. L. Tigue Moore Field at Russo Park • Lafayette, LA	Season suspended due to COVID-19 pandemic							

Postseason (0–0)

SBC Tournament (0–0)
Date	Opponent	Seed/Rank	Site/stadium	Score	Win	Loss	Save	TV	Attendance	Overall record	SBC record
May 20			Montgomery Riverwalk Stadium • Montgomery, AL	Championship Series suspended due to COVID-19 pandemic							

Schedule source:

*Rankings are based on the team's current ranking in the D1Baseball poll.
