= 2020 Appalachian State Mountaineers baseball team =

American college baseball season

2020 Appalachian State Mountaineers baseball
- Conference: Sun Belt Conference
- East Division
- Record: 11–6 (0–0 SBC)
- Head coach: Kermit Smith (4th season)
- Assistant coaches: Justin Aspergren; Britt Johnson; Erik Lunde
- Home stadium: Beaver Field at Jim and Bettie Smith Stadium

2020 Sun Belt Conference baseball standings
	Conf.				Overall
Team	W		L	PCT	W		L	PCT
East Division
Coastal Carolina ‍‍‍	0	–	0	–	11	–	5	.688
Georgia Southern ‍‍‍	0	–	0	–	11	–	5	.688
Appalachian State ‍‍‍	0	–	0	–	11	–	6	.647
Georgia State ‍‍‍	0	–	0	–	9	–	7	.563
Troy ‍‍‍	0	–	0	–	9	–	8	.529
South Alabama ‍‍‍	0	–	0	–	8	–	10	.444
West Division
Texas State ‍‍‍	0	–	0	–	14	–	4	.778
UT Arlington ‍‍‍	0	–	0	–	12	–	4	.750
Louisiana–Monroe ‍‍‍	0	–	0	–	12	–	5	.706
Little Rock ‍‍‍	0	–	0	–	9	–	8	.529
Louisiana ‍‍‍	0	–	0	–	8	–	9	.471
Arkansas State ‍‍‍	0	–	0	–	7	–	9	.438
x – Division champion ‡ – Tournament champion y – Invited to the NCAA tournament As of March 12, 2020; Rankings from D1Baseball

The 2020 Appalachian State Mountaineers baseball team represented Appalachian State University in the 2020 NCAA Division I baseball season. The Mountaineers played their home games at Beaver Field at Jim and Bettie Smith Stadium and were led by fourth year head coach Kermit Smith.

On March 12, the Sun Belt Conference announced the indefinite suspension of all spring athletics, including baseball, due to the increasing risk of the COVID-19 pandemic.

== Preseason ==
=== Signing Day Recruits ===
Player	Hometown	Previous Team
Pitchers
Noah Hall	Charlotte, North Carolina	Providence HS
Quinton Martinez	Orlando, Florida	St. Petersburg College
Shane Roberts	Jupiter, Florida	Palm Beach State College
Cy Smith	Lenoir, North Carolina	West Caldwell HS
Hitters
Luke Bumgarner	Lowell, North Carolina	North Gaston HS
Andrew Greckel	Acworth, Georgia	Chattahoochee Valley CC
Peyton Idol	Advance, North Carolina	West Forsythe HS
Jack Lipson	Macon, Georgia	Chattahoochee Valley CC
Vasilios Kaloudis	Charlotte, North Carolina	Ardrey Kell HS
Patrick Trease	Holly Springs, North Carolina	Holly Springs HS
JD Yakubinis	Charlotte, North Carolina	Providence HS

=== Sun Belt Conference Coaches Poll ===
The Sun Belt Conference Coaches Poll was released sometime on January 30, 2020, and the Mountaineers were picked to finish fifth in the East Division.

Coaches poll (East)
Predicted finish	Team	Votes (1st place)
1	South Alabama	62 (6)
2	Coastal Carolina	61 (4)
3	Georgia Southern	50 (2)
4	Troy	41
5	Appalachian State	23
6	Georgia State	15

=== Preseason All-Sun Belt Team & Honors ===
- Drake Nightengale (USA Sr, Pitcher)
- Zach McCambley (CCU Jr, Pitcher)
- Levi Thomas (TROY Jr, Pitcher)
- Andrew Papp (APP Sr, Pitcher)
- Jack Jumper (ARST Sr, Pitcher)
- Kale Emshoff (LR, RS-Jr, Catcher)
- Kaleb DeLatorre (USA Sr, First Base)
- Luke Drumheller (APP, So, Second Base)
- Hayden Cantrelle (LA Jr, Shortstop)
- Garrett Scott (LR, RS-Sr, Third Base)
- Mason McWhorter (GASO Sr, Outfielder)
- Ethan Wilson (USA, So, Outfielder)
- Rigsby Mosley (TROY Jr, Outfielder)
- Will Hollis (TXST Sr, Designated Hitter)
- Andrew Beesley (ULM Sr, Utility)

== Personnel ==
=== Roster ===
2020 Appalachian State Mountaineers roster
Pitchers: 10 Cameron Kepley - Junior; 11 Evan Mauldin - Sophomore; 13 Cole Hooper - Sophomore; 14 Cy Smith - Freshman; 16 Noah Hall - Freshman; 18 Quinton Martinez - Junior; 20 Andrew Papp - Senior; 21 Tyler Tuthill - Sophomore; 24 Will Herman - Redshirt Senior; 26 Jason Cornatzer - Junior; 30 Shane Roberts - Sophomore; 33 Austin Primm - Sophomore; 36 Matthew Helms - Redshirt Freshman; 37 Cam Roberts - Redshirt Sophomore; 39 Joseph Lowder - Redshirt Junior; 42 Jack Hartman - Senior; 44 Luke Davis - Junior	Catchers: 8 JD Yakubinis - Freshman; 25 Jack Lipson - Junior; 35 Hayden Cross - Sophomore; Infielders: 2 Luke Allison - Redshirt Senior; 3 Bailey Welch - Junior; 4 Luke Drumheller - Sophomore; 7 Peyton Idol - Freshman; 9 Patrick Trease - Freshman; 28 Robbie Young - Senior; 32 Andrew Terrell - Sophomore; 38 Bret Baldwin - Senior; 40 Vasilios Kaloudis - Freshman	Outfielders: 5 Kendall McGowan - Junior; 19 Dalton Williams - Sophomore; 22 Alex Leshock - Junior; 27 Tyler Leek - Junior; 34 Phillip Cole - Sophomore; Utility: 17 Andrew Greckel - Junior

=== Coaching staff ===
2020 Appalachian State Mountaineers coaching staff
- Kermit Smith – Head Coach – 4th year
- Justin Aspergren – Assistant Head Coach – 5th year
- Britt Johnson – Assistant Head Coach – 4th year
- Erik Lunde – Assistant Head Coach/Hitting Coach – 2nd year

== Schedule and results ==
Legend
	Appalachian State win
	Appalachian State loss
	Postponement/Cancelation/Suspensions
**Bold**	Appalachian State team member

2020 Appalachian State Mountaineers baseball game log
Regular season (11–6)

February (5-5)
Date	Opponent	Rank	Site/stadium	Score	Win	Loss	Save	TV	Attendance	Overall record	SBC record
Feb. 14	at Gardner–Webb		John Henry Moss Stadium • Boiling Springs, NC	**L** 1-5	Mitchell (1–0)	**Tuthill** (0–1)	None	ESPN+	547	0-1	
Feb. 15	at Gardner–Webb		John Henry Moss Stadium • Boiling Springs, NC	**L** 4-5	Lane (1–0)	**Roberts** (0–1)	None	ESPN+	511	0-2	
Feb. 16	at Gardner–Webb		John Henry Moss Stadium • Boiling Springs, NC	**W** 10-1	**Martinez** (1–0)	Davis (0–1)	None	ESPN+	433	1-2	
Feb. 18	at North Carolina A&T		World War Memorial Stadium • Greensboro, NC	**W** 6-2 (8 inn)	**Hooper** (1–0)	Smith (0–1)	None		153	2-2	
Feb. 21	at Kentucky		Kentucky Proud Park • Lexington, KY	**L** 3-7	Ramsey (1-1)	**Tuthill** (0–2)	None	SECN+	2,019	2-3	
Feb. 22	at Kentucky		Kentucky Proud Park • Lexington, KY	**L** 4-21	Hazelwood (1–0)	**Roberts** (0–1)	None	SECN+	2,217	2-4	
Feb. 23	at Kentucky		Kentucky Proud Park • Lexington, KY	**L** 7-8 (15 inn)	Daniels (1–0)	**Cole** (0–1)	None	SECN+	2,392	2-5	
Feb. 26	at Wake Forest		David F. Couch Ballpark • Winston-Salem, NC	**W** 11-9	**Hartman** (1–0)	McNamee (0–1)	None		504	3-5	
Feb. 28	at UNC Greensboro		UNCG Baseball Stadium • Greensboro, NC	**W** 5-1	**Tuthill** (1–2)	Lewis (0–2)	None		321	4-5	
Feb. 29	at UNC Greensboro		UNCG Baseball Stadium • Greensboro, NC	**W** 6-5	**Roberts**(1-1)	Sanderson (1-1)	**Hartman** (1)		330	5-5	

March (6–1)
Date	Opponent	Rank	Site/stadium	Score	Win	Loss	Save	TV	Attendance	Overall record	SBC record
Mar. 1	at UNC Greensboro		UNCG Baseball Stadium • Greensboro, NC	**L** 7-8 (15 inn)	Parsley (2–0)	**Helms** (0–1)	None		357	5-6	
Mar. 4	at Western Carolina		Hennon Stadium • Cullowhee, NC	**W** 2-0	**Hall** (1–0)	Bright (0–1)	**Hartman** (2)	ESPN+	457	6-6	
Mar. 6	at Charleston Southern		CSU Ballpark • North Charleston, SC	**W** 8-4	**Hall** (2–0)	Illing (0–1)	None		76	7-6	
Mar. 7	at Charleston Southern		CSU Ballpark • North Charleston, SC	**W** 9-1	**Martinez** (2–0)	Padysak (2-2)	None		105	8-6	
Mar. 8	at Charleston Southern		CSU Ballpark • North Charleston, SC	**W** 4-2	**Hooper** (1–0)	Weinberger (1–2)	**Hartman** (3)		127	9-6	
Mar. 10	Siena		Beaver Field at Jim and Bettie Smith Stadium • Boone, NC	**W** 7-5	**Roberts** (2–1)	Quigley (0–1)	**Hall** (1)		346	10-6	
Mar. 11	Siena		Beaver Field at Jim and Bettie Smith Stadium • Boone, NC	**W** 9-8	**Papp** (1–0)	Metz (0–1)	**Hartman** (4)		873	11-6	
Mar. 13	at Texas State		Bobcat Ballpark • San Marcos, TX	Season suspended due to COVID-19 pandemic							
Mar. 14	at Texas State		Bobcat Ballpark • San Marcos, TX	Season suspended due to COVID-19 pandemic							
Mar. 15	at Texas State		Bobcat Ballpark • San Marcos, TX	Season suspended due to COVID-19 pandemic							
Mar. 17	North Carolina A&T		Beaver Field at Jim and Bettie Smith Stadium • Boone, NC	Season suspended due to COVID-19 pandemic							
Mar. 20	Louisiana		Beaver Field at Jim and Bettie Smith Stadium • Boone, NC	Season suspended due to COVID-19 pandemic							
Mar. 21	Louisiana		Beaver Field at Jim and Bettie Smith Stadium • Boone, NC	Season suspended due to COVID-19 pandemic							
Mar. 22	Louisiana		Beaver Field at Jim and Bettie Smith Stadium • Boone, NC	Season suspended due to COVID-19 pandemic							
Mar. 24	North Carolina Central		Beaver Field at Jim and Bettie Smith Stadium • Boone, NC	Season suspended due to COVID-19 pandemic							
Mar. 27	at Little Rock		Gary Hogan Field • Little Rock, AR	Season suspended due to COVID-19 pandemic							
Mar. 28	at Little Rock		Gary Hogan Field • Little Rock, AR	Season suspended due to COVID-19 pandemic							
Mar. 29	at Little Rock		Gary Hogan Field • Little Rock, AR	Season suspended due to COVID-19 pandemic							
Mar. 31	vs South Carolina		BB&T Ballpark • Charlotte, NC	Season suspended due to COVID-19 pandemic							

April (0-0)
Date	Opponent	Rank	Site/stadium	Score	Win	Loss	Save	TV	Attendance	Overall record	SBC record
Apr. 3	Georgia Southern		Beaver Field at Jim and Bettie Smith Stadium • Boone, NC	Season suspended due to COVID-19 pandemic							
Apr. 4	Georgia Southern		Beaver Field at Jim and Bettie Smith Stadium • Boone, NC	Season suspended due to COVID-19 pandemic							
Apr. 5	Georgia Southern		Beaver Field at Jim and Bettie Smith Stadium • Boone, NC	Season suspended due to COVID-19 pandemic							
Apr. 7	at UNC Asheville		Greenville Baseball Field • Asheville, NC	Season suspended due to COVID-19 pandemic							
Apr. 9	at South Alabama		Eddie Stankey Field • Mobile, AL	Season suspended due to COVID-19 pandemic							
Apr. 10	at South Alabama		Eddie Stankey Field • Mobile, AL	Season suspended due to COVID-19 pandemic							
Apr. 11	at South Alabama		Eddie Stankey Field • Mobile, AL	Season suspended due to COVID-19 pandemic							
Apr. 14	at North Carolina Central		Durham Athletic Park • Durham, NC	Season suspended due to COVID-19 pandemic							
Apr. 15	Wake Forest		Beaver Field at Jim and Bettie Smith Stadium • Boone, NC	Season suspended due to COVID-19 pandemic							
Apr. 17	Troy		Beaver Field at Jim and Bettie Smith Stadium • Boone, NC	Season suspended due to COVID-19 pandemic							
Apr. 18	Troy		Beaver Field at Jim and Bettie Smith Stadium • Boone, NC	Season suspended due to COVID-19 pandemic							
Apr. 19	Troy		Beaver Field at Jim and Bettie Smith Stadium • Boone, NC	Season suspended due to COVID-19 pandemic							
Apr. 21	East Tennessee State		Beaver Field at Jim and Bettie Smith Stadium • Boone, NC	Season suspended due to COVID-19 pandemic							
Apr. 24	at Louisiana–Monroe		Warhawk Field • Monroe, LA	Season suspended due to COVID-19 pandemic							
Apr. 25	at Louisiana–Monroe		Warhawk Field • Monroe, LA	Season suspended due to COVID-19 pandemic							
Apr. 26	at Louisiana–Monroe		Warhawk Field • Monroe, LA	Season suspended due to COVID-19 pandemic							
Apr. 28	UNC Asheville		Beaver Field at Jim and Bettie Smith Stadium • Boone, NC	Season suspended due to COVID-19 pandemic							

May (0–0)
Date	Opponent	Rank	Site/stadium	Score	Win	Loss	Save	TV	Attendance	Overall record	SBC record
May 1	Arkansas State		Beaver Field at Jim and Bettie Smith Stadium • Boone, NC	Season suspended due to COVID-19 pandemic							
May 2	Arkansas State		Beaver Field at Jim and Bettie Smith Stadium • Boone, NC	Season suspended due to COVID-19 pandemic							
May 3	Arkansas State		Beaver Field at Jim and Bettie Smith Stadium • Boone, NC	Season suspended due to COVID-19 pandemic							
May 8	at Georgia State		Georgia State Baseball Complex • Atlanta, GA	Season suspended due to COVID-19 pandemic							
May 9	at Georgia State		Georgia State Baseball Complex • Atlanta, GA	Season suspended due to COVID-19 pandemic							
May 10	at Georgia State		Georgia State Baseball Complex • Atlanta, GA	Season suspended due to COVID-19 pandemic							
May 12	North Carolina		Beaver Field at Jim and Bettie Smith Stadium • Boone, NC	Season suspended due to COVID-19 pandemic							
May 14	Coastal Carolina		Beaver Field at Jim and Bettie Smith Stadium • Boone, NC	Season suspended due to COVID-19 pandemic							
May 15	Coastal Carolina		Beaver Field at Jim and Bettie Smith Stadium • Boone, NC	Season suspended due to COVID-19 pandemic							
May 16	Coastal Carolina		Beaver Field at Jim and Bettie Smith Stadium • Boone, NC	Season suspended due to COVID-19 pandemic							

Post-season (0–0)

SBC Tournament (0–0)
Date	Opponent	Seed/Rank	Site/stadium	Score	Win	Loss	Save	TV	Attendance	Overall record	SBC record
May 20			Montgomery Riverwalk Stadium • Montgomery, AL	Tournament canceled due to COVID-19 pandemic							

Schedule source:

*Rankings are based on the team's current ranking in the D1Baseball poll.
