= 2020 Texas State Bobcats baseball team =

American college baseball season

2020 Texas State Bobcats baseball
- Conference: Sun Belt Conference
- West Division
- Record: 14–4 (0–0 SBC)
- Head coach: Steven Trout (1st season)
- Assistant coaches: Josh Blakley; Chad Massengale
- Home stadium: Bobcat Ballpark

2020 Sun Belt Conference baseball standings
	Conf.				Overall
Team	W		L	PCT	W		L	PCT
East Division
Coastal Carolina ‍‍‍	0	–	0	–	11	–	5	.688
Georgia Southern ‍‍‍	0	–	0	–	11	–	5	.688
Appalachian State ‍‍‍	0	–	0	–	11	–	6	.647
Georgia State ‍‍‍	0	–	0	–	9	–	7	.563
Troy ‍‍‍	0	–	0	–	9	–	8	.529
South Alabama ‍‍‍	0	–	0	–	8	–	10	.444
West Division
Texas State ‍‍‍	0	–	0	–	14	–	4	.778
UT Arlington ‍‍‍	0	–	0	–	12	–	4	.750
Louisiana–Monroe ‍‍‍	0	–	0	–	12	–	5	.706
Little Rock ‍‍‍	0	–	0	–	9	–	8	.529
Louisiana ‍‍‍	0	–	0	–	8	–	9	.471
Arkansas State ‍‍‍	0	–	0	–	7	–	9	.438
x – Division champion ‡ – Tournament champion y – Invited to the NCAA tournament As of March 12, 2020; Rankings from D1Baseball

The 2020 Texas State Bobcats baseball team represented Texas State University in the 2020 NCAA Division I baseball season. The Bobcats played their home games at Bobcat Ballpark and were led by first year head coach Steven Trout.

On March 12, the Sun Belt Conference announced the indefinite suspension of all spring athletics, including baseball, due to the increasing risk of the COVID-19 pandemic. Soon after, the Sun Belt cancelled all season and postseason play.

== Preseason ==
=== Signing Day Recruits ===
Player	Hometown	Previous Team
Pitchers
Colby Cooke	Spring, Texas	Oak Ridge HS
Jerry Cuevas	Southlake, Texas	Southlake Carroll HS
Triston Dixon	Conroe, Texas	Angelina College
Josh Hernandez	Frisco, Texas	Reedy HS
Carson Keithley	Alvin, Texas	Alvin HS
Jonathan Martinez	Mission, Texas	Palmview HS
Rhett McCaffety	Houston, Texas	Cy-Fair HS
Cade Medlin	Diana, Texas	New Diana HS
Kole Tauzin	Klein, Texas	Klein HS
Zeke Wood	Paris, Texas	North Central Texas College
Hitters
Peyton Benesh	Austin, Texas	James Bowie HS
Jose Gonzalez	Spring, Texas	Navarro College
Logan Hamm	Bridge City, Texas	Bridge City HS
Cade Manning	Southlake, Texas	Southlake Carroll HS
Fabian Mayfield	Cypress, Texas	Cypress Ranch HS
Ben McClain	Pearland, Texas	Howard College

=== Sun Belt Conference Coaches Poll ===
The Sun Belt Conference Coaches Poll will be released sometime around January 30, 2020 and the Bobcats were picked to finish third in the West Division and tied for fourth overall in the conference.

Coaches poll (West)
Predicted finish	Team	Votes (1st place)
1	UT Arlington	58 (3)
2	Louisiana	57 (5)
3	Texas State	55 (3)
4	Little Rock	39 (1)
5	Louisiana–Monroe	25
6	Arkansas State	18

=== Preseason All-Sun Belt Team & Honors ===
- Drake Nightengale (USA, Sr, Pitcher)
- Zach McCambley (CCU, Jr, Pitcher)
- Levi Thomas (TROY, Jr, Pitcher)
- Andrew Papp (APP, Sr, Pitcher)
- Jack Jumper (ARST, Sr, Pitcher)
- Kale Emshoff (LR, RS-Jr, Catcher)
- Kaleb DeLatorre (USA, Sr, First Base)
- Luke Drumheller (APP, So, Second Base)
- Hayden Cantrelle (LA, Jr, Shortstop)
- Garrett Scott (LR, RS-Sr, Third Base)
- Mason McWhorter (GASO, Sr, Outfielder)
- Ethan Wilson (USA, So, Outfielder)
- Rigsby Mosley (TROY, Jr, Outfielder)
- Will Hollis (TXST, Sr, Designated Hitter)
- Andrew Beesley (ULM, Sr, Utility)

== Roster ==
2020 Texas State Bobcats roster
Pitchers: 3 Trevis Sundgren - Junior; 4 Jacob Little - Senior; 9 Brent Hebert - Redshirt Seniors; 12 Jacob Millender - Junior; 13 Cade Bullinger - Redshirt Junior; 14 Hayden Vanderroest - Freshman; 16 Tristan Stivors - Junior; 18 Wes Engle - Redshirt Senior; 20 Reece Gould - Sophomore; 26 Brett Brown - Freshman; 27 Otto Wofford - Freshman; 28 Matthew Nicholas - Redshirt Sophomore; 31 Garrett Herrmann - Senior; 32 Dontae Woodard - Sophomore; 35 Cameron Bush - Redshirt Freshman; 36 Isaac Ponce - Freshman; 39 Tony Robie - Freshman; 42 Zachary Leigh - Senior; 43 Damon Fernandez - Redshirt Freshman; 47 Evan Hendricks - Freshman	Catchers: 2 Tucker Redden - Redshirt Senior; 19 Colton Moore - Sophomore; 24 Peyton Lewis - Sophomore; 41 Caleb Munton - Freshman; Infielders: 1 Jaxon Williams - Senior; 8 Dalton Shuffield - Junior; 10 Justin Thompson - Junior; 11 Cameron Gibbons - Junior; 24 Wesley Faison - Junior; 25 Cole Coffey - Senior; 29 Casey Sunseri - Freshman	Outfielders: 6 Will Hollis - Redshirt Senior; 7 John Wuthrich - Junior; 15 Chase Evans - Senior; 17 Isaiah Ortega-Jones - Junior; 34 Gabe Briski - Freshman; 46 Jared Younce - Freshman; Utility: 38 Cade Sitka - Freshman

=== Coaching staff ===
2020 Texas State Bobcats coaching staff
- Steven Trout – Head Coach – 1st year
- Josh Blakley – Assistant Head Coach/Recruiting Coordinator – 2nd year
- Chad Massengale – Assistant Head Coach – 3rd year
- Jerry Cervantez – Volunteer Assistant Coach – 2nd year

== Schedule and results ==
Legend
	Texas State win
	Texas State loss
	Postponement/Cancelation/Suspensions
**Bold**	Texas State team member

2020 Texas State Bobcats baseball game log
Regular season (14-4)

February (7-4)
Date	Opponent	Rank	Site/stadium	Score	Win	Loss	Save	TV	Attendance	Overall record	SBC record
Feb. 14	Stony Brook		Bobcat Ballpark • San Marcos, TX	**W** 4-3	**Hebert** (1-0)	Fero (0-1)	**Stivors** (1)		1,238	1-0	
Feb. 15	Stony Brook		Bobcat Ballpark • San Marcos, TX	**W** 6-0	**Sundgren** (1-0)	Turcotte (0-1)	None		1,345	2-0	
Feb. 15	Stony Brook		Bobcat Ballpark • San Marcos, TX	**L** 2-3	DeGennaro (1-0)	**Nicholas** (0-1)	Bonanno (1)		1,345	2-1	
Feb. 16	Stony Brook		Bobcat Ballpark • San Marcos, TX	**W** 4-3	**Robie** (1-0)	Lashley (0-1)	**Hebert** (1)		1,085	3-1	
Feb. 19	at Houston Baptist		Husky Field • Houston, TX	**L** 5-7	Burns (1-1)	**Ponce** (0-1)	None		345	3-2	
Feb. 21	Lamar		Bobcat Ballpark • San Marcos, TX	**L** 1-3	Michael (1-0)	**Leigh** (0-1)	Dallas (1)		1,113	3-3	
Feb. 22	Lamar		Bobcat Ballpark • San Marcos, TX	**W** 4-3	**Hebert** (2-0)	Palmer (0-1)	None		1,495	4-3	
Feb. 23	Lamar		Bobcat Ballpark • San Marcos, TX	**W** 8-7	**Bush** (1-0)	Faith (0-1)	**Stivors** (2)		1,099	5-3	
Feb. 26	Rice		Bobcat Ballpark • San Marcos, TX	**W** 9-2	**Nicholas** (1-0)	Deskins (0-1)	None	ESPN+	1,307	6-3	
Feb. 28	at Houston		Schroeder Park • Houston, TX	**W** 11-10	**Leigh** (1-1)	Lockhart (1-1)	**Hebert** (2)		1,228	7-3	
Feb. 29	at Houston		Schroeder Park • Houston, TX	**L** 1-5	Aguilar (1-0)	**Sundgren** (1-1)	Henry (1)		1,214	7-4	

March (7-0)
Date	Opponent	Rank	Site/stadium	Score	Win	Loss	Save	TV	Attendance	Overall record	SBC record
Mar. 1	at Houston		Schroeder Park • Houston, TX	**W** 12-4	**Gould** (1-0)	Hurdsman (1-2)	None		1,234	8-4	
Mar. 3	at Baylor		Baylor Ballpark • Waco, TX	**W** 12-2 (8 inn)	**Robie** (2-0)	Needham (0-1)	None	ESPN+	1,462	9-4	
Mar. 6	Bethune–Cookman		Bobcat Ballpark • San Marcos, TX	**W** 5-0	**Hebert** (3-0)	Gutierrez (0-1)	None		1,203	10-4	
Mar. 7	Bethune–Cookman		Bobcat Ballpark • San Marcos, TX	**W** 3-2	**Bush** (2-0)	Valiente (2-2)	**Stivors** (3)		1,072	11-4	
Mar. 8	Bethune–Cookman		Bobcat Ballpark • San Marcos, TX	**W** 4-3	**Wofford** (1-0)	Ortiz (0-1)	**Stivors** (4)		1,016	12-4	
Mar. 10	UTSA		Bobcat Ballpark • San Marcos, TX	**W** 11-1 (8 inn)	**Robie** (3-0)	McKay (1-2)	None	ESPN+	1,402	13-4	
Mar. 11	Prairie View A&M		Bobcat Ballpark • San Marcos, TX	**W** 11-4	**Ponce** (1-0)	Hines (0-1)	None		1,004	14-4	
Mar. 13	Appalachian State		Bobcat Ballpark • San Marcos, TX	Season suspended due to COVID-19 pandemic							
Mar. 14	Appalachian State		Bobcat Ballpark • San Marcos, TX	Season suspended due to COVID-19 pandemic							
Mar. 15	Appalachian State		Bobcat Ballpark • San Marcos, TX	Season suspended due to COVID-19 pandemic							
Mar. 18	at UTSA		Roadrunner Field • San Antonio, TX	Season suspended due to COVID-19 pandemic							
Mar. 20	at Arkansas State		Tomlinson Stadium–Kell Field • Jonesboro, AR	Season suspended due to COVID-19 pandemic							
Mar. 21	at Arkansas State		Tomlinson Stadium–Kell Field • Jonesboro, AR	Season suspended due to COVID-19 pandemic							
Mar. 22	at Arkansas State		Tomlinson Stadium–Kell Field • Jonesboro, AR	Season suspended due to COVID-19 pandemic							
Mar. 24	Texas		Bobcat Ballpark • San Marcos, TX	Season suspended due to COVID-19 pandemic							
Mar. 27	Coastal Carolina		Bobcat Ballpark • San Marcos, TX	Season suspended due to COVID-19 pandemic							
Mar. 28	Coastal Carolina		Bobcat Ballpark • San Marcos, TX	Season suspended due to COVID-19 pandemic							
Mar. 29	Coastal Carolina		Bobcat Ballpark • San Marcos, TX	Season suspended due to COVID-19 pandemic							

April (0-0)
Date	Opponent	Rank	Site/stadium	Score	Win	Loss	Save	TV	Attendance	Overall record	SBC record
Apr. 1	at Rice		Reckling Park • Houston, TX	Season suspended due to COVID-19 pandemic							
Apr. 3	at Louisiana–Monroe		Warhawk Field • Monroe, LA	Season suspended due to COVID-19 pandemic							
Apr. 4	at Louisiana–Monroe		Warhawk Field • Monroe, LA	Season suspended due to COVID-19 pandemic							
Apr. 5	at Louisiana–Monroe		Warhawk Field • Monroe, LA	Season suspended due to COVID-19 pandemic							
Apr. 7	Incarnate Word		Bobcat Ballpark • San Marcos, TX	Season suspended due to COVID-19 pandemic							
Apr. 9	Louisiana		Bobcat Ballpark • San Marcos, TX	Season suspended due to COVID-19 pandemic							
Apr. 10	Louisiana		Bobcat Ballpark • San Marcos, TX	Season suspended due to COVID-19 pandemic							
Apr. 11	Louisiana		Bobcat Ballpark • San Marcos, TX	Season suspended due to COVID-19 pandemic							
Apr. 14	at Texas A&M		Blue Bell Park • College Station, TX	Season suspended due to COVID-19 pandemic							
Apr. 17	at Georgia State		Georgia State Baseball Complex • Atlanta, GA	Season suspended due to COVID-19 pandemic							
Apr. 18	at Georgia State		Georgia State Baseball Complex • Atlanta, GA	Season suspended due to COVID-19 pandemic							
Apr. 19	at Georgia State		Georgia State Baseball Complex • Atlanta, GA	Season suspended due to COVID-19 pandemic							
Apr. 21	at Texas		UFCU Disch–Falk Field • Austin, TX	Season suspended due to COVID-19 pandemic							
Apr. 24	Little Rock		Bobcat Ballpark • San Marcos, TX	Season suspended due to COVID-19 pandemic							
Apr. 25	Little Rock		Bobcat Ballpark • San Marcos, TX	Season suspended due to COVID-19 pandemic							
Apr. 26	Little Rock		Bobcat Ballpark • San Marcos, TX	Season suspended due to COVID-19 pandemic							
Apr. 28	UTSA		Bobcat Ballpark • San Marcos, TX	Season suspended due to COVID-19 pandemic							

May (0–0)
Date	Opponent	Rank	Site/stadium	Score	Win	Loss	Save	TV	Attendance	Overall record	SBC record
May 1	at Troy		Riddle–Pace Field • Troy, AL	Season suspended due to COVID-19 pandemic							
May 2	at Troy		Riddle–Pace Field • Troy, AL	Season suspended due to COVID-19 pandemic							
May 3	at Troy		Riddle–Pace Field • Troy, AL	Season suspended due to COVID-19 pandemic							
May 5	Texas–Rio Grande Valley		Bobcat Ballpark • San Marcos, TX	Season suspended due to COVID-19 pandemic							
May 8	Georgia Southern		Bobcat Ballpark • San Marcos, TX	Season suspended due to COVID-19 pandemic							
May 9	Georgia Southern		Bobcat Ballpark • San Marcos, TX	Season suspended due to COVID-19 pandemic							
May 10	Georgia Southern		Bobcat Ballpark • San Marcos, TX	Season suspended due to COVID-19 pandemic							
May 14	at UT Arlington		Clay Gould Ballpark • Arlington, TX	Season suspended due to COVID-19 pandemic							
May 15	at UT Arlington		Clay Gould Ballpark • Arlington, TX	Season suspended due to COVID-19 pandemic							
May 16	at UT Arlington		Clay Gould Ballpark • Arlington, TX	Season suspended due to COVID-19 pandemic							

Postseason (0–0)

SBC Tournament (0–0)
Date	Opponent	Seed/Rank	Site/stadium	Score	Win	Loss	Save	TV	Attendance	Overall record	SBC record
May 20			Montgomery Riverwalk Stadium • Montgomery, AL	Championship Series suspended due to COVID-19 pandemic							

Schedule source:

*Rankings are based on the team's current ranking in the D1Baseball poll.
