= 2020 Coastal Carolina Chanticleers baseball team =

American college baseball season

2020 Coastal Carolina Chanticleers baseball
- Conference: Sun Belt Conference
- East Division
- Record: 11–5 (0–0 SBC)
- Head coach: Gary Gilmore (25th season)
- Assistant coaches: Kevin Schnall (17th season); Drew Thomas (14th season); Matt Schilling (13th season)
- Home stadium: Springs Brooks Stadium

2020 Sun Belt Conference baseball standings
	Conf.				Overall
Team	W		L	PCT	W		L	PCT
East Division
Coastal Carolina ‍‍‍	0	–	0	–	11	–	5	.688
Georgia Southern ‍‍‍	0	–	0	–	11	–	5	.688
Appalachian State ‍‍‍	0	–	0	–	11	–	6	.647
Georgia State ‍‍‍	0	–	0	–	9	–	7	.563
Troy ‍‍‍	0	–	0	–	9	–	8	.529
South Alabama ‍‍‍	0	–	0	–	8	–	10	.444
West Division
Texas State ‍‍‍	0	–	0	–	14	–	4	.778
UT Arlington ‍‍‍	0	–	0	–	12	–	4	.750
Louisiana–Monroe ‍‍‍	0	–	0	–	12	–	5	.706
Little Rock ‍‍‍	0	–	0	–	9	–	8	.529
Louisiana ‍‍‍	0	–	0	–	8	–	9	.471
Arkansas State ‍‍‍	0	–	0	–	7	–	9	.438
x – Division champion ‡ – Tournament champion y – Invited to the NCAA tournament As of March 12, 2020; Rankings from D1Baseball

The 2020 Coastal Carolina Chanticleers baseball team represented Coastal Carolina University in the 2020 NCAA Division I baseball season. The Chanticleers played their home games at Springs Brooks Stadium and were led by twenty-fifth year head coach Gary Gilmore.

On March 12, the Sun Belt Conference announced the indefinite suspension of all spring athletics, including baseball, due to the increasing risk of the COVID-19 pandemic.

== Preseason ==
=== Signing Day Recruits ===
Player	Hometown	Previous Team
Pitchers
Aaron Combs	Bradenton, Florida	IMG Academy
Luke Barrow	Oak Ridge, North Carolina	Wesleyan Christian Academy
Riley Eikhoff	Bristow, Virginia	Patriot HS
Keaton Hopwood	Wilmington, Illinois	Wilmington HS
Matt Joyce	Braintree, Massachusetts	St. Sebastian's School
Connor Kurki	Iola, Wisconsin	Iola–Scandinavia HS
Teddy Sharkey	Wall, New Jersey	Wall HS
Hitters
Clay Wargo	Huntingtown, Maryland	Huntingtown HS
Wade Kelly	Massapequa, New York	Massapequa HS
Billy Underwood	St. Louis, Missouri	IMG Academy
Brayden Brady Moore	Talking Rock, Georgia	Pickens County HS

=== Sun Belt Conference Coaches Poll ===
The Sun Belt Conference Coaches Poll will be released sometime around January 30, 2020 and the Chanticleers were picked to finish second in the East Division and third overall in the conference.

Coaches poll (East)
Predicted finish	Team	Votes (1st place)
1	South Alabama	62 (6)
2	Coastal Carolina	61 (4)
3	Georgia Southern	50 (2)
4	Troy	41
5	Appalachian State	23
6	Georgia State	15

=== Preseason All-Sun Belt Team & Honors ===
- Drake Nightengale (USA, Sr, Pitcher)
- Zach McCambley (CCU, Jr, Pitcher)
- Levi Thomas (TROY, Jr, Pitcher)
- Andrew Papp (APP, Sr, Pitcher)
- Jack Jumper (ARST, Sr, Pitcher)
- Kale Emshoff (LR, RS-Jr, Catcher)
- Kaleb DeLatorre (USA, Sr, First Base)
- Luke Drumheller (APP, So, Second Base)
- Hayden Cantrelle (LA, Jr, Shortstop)
- Garrett Scott (LR, RS-Sr, Third Base)
- Mason McWhorter (GASO, Sr, Outfielder)
- Ethan Wilson (USA, So, Outfielder)
- Rigsby Mosley (TROY, Jr, Outfielder)
- Will Hollis (TXST, Sr, Designated Hitter)
- Andrew Beesley (ULM, Sr, Utility)

== Roster ==
2020 Coastal Carolina Chanticleers roster
Pitchers: 8 Alaska Abney - Sophomore; 13 Shaddon Peavyhouse - Redshirt Sophomore; 13 Johnathan Blackwell - Freshman; 18 Scott Kobos - Redshirt Senior; 26 Griffin Holcombe - Freshman; 30 Chase Antle - Graduate Student; 31 Will Smith - Freshman; 32 Josh Jarman - Junior; 34 Jay Causey - Redshirt Senior; 35 Jacob Maton - Redshirt Freshman; 37 Nick Parker - Sophomore; 38 Reid Vanscoter - Redshirt Sophomore; 39 Zach McCambley - Junior; 40 Casey Green - Freshman; 41 Trevor Damron - Junior	Catchers: 25 BT Riopelle - Sophomore; 27 Tanner Garrison - Freshman; 29 Joe Singley - Redshirt Junior; 33 Alex Gattinelli - Junior; 47 Hunter Ashburn - Redshirt Junior; Infielders: 1 Dale Thomas - Freshman; 5 Brian Port - Freshman; 6 Nick Lucky - Sophomore; 7 Cooper Weiss - Freshman; 10 Scott McKeon - Senior; 11 Connor Kirkley - Freshman; 16 Zach Beach - Freshman; 19 Fox Leum - Redshirt Junior; 20 Eric Brown - Freshman; 36 - Walt Richardson - Redshirt Freshman	Outfielders: 2 Kyle Westfall - Freshman; 3 Parker Chavers - Junior; 17 Jared Johnson - Redshirt Junior; 23 Makenzie Pate - Freshman; 24 Morgan Hyde - Senior

=== Coaching staff ===
2020 Coastal Carolina Chanticleers coaching staff
- Gary Gilmore – Head Coach – 25th year
- Kevin Schnall – Associate head coach/recruiting coordinator/Catchers Coach/Acting Head Coach (part of 2020) – 17th year
- Drew Thomas – Assistant Head Coach/Pitching Coach – 14th year
- Matt Schilling – Volunteer Assistant Coach – 14th year

== Schedule and results ==
Legend
	Coastal Carolina win
	Coastal Carolina loss
	Postponement/Cancelation/Suspensions
**Bold**	Coastal Carolina team member

2020 Coastal Carolina Chanticleers baseball game log
Regular season (11-5)

February (6-3)
Date	Opponent	Rank	Site/stadium	Score	Win	Loss	Save	TV	Attendance	Overall record	SBC record
Brittain Resorts Baseball at the Beach Tournament
Feb. 14	UNC Greensboro		Springs Brooks Stadium • Conway, SC	**W** 12-4	**McCambley** (1-0)	Lewis (0-1)	None		2,391	1-0	
Feb. 15	San Diego State		Springs Brooks Stadium • Conway, SC	**L** 1-3	Melton (1-0)	**Kobos** (0-1)	Brown (1)		2,138	1-1	
Feb. 16	Virginia Tech		Springs Brooks Stadium • Conway, SC	Game canceled due to heavy rain and inclement weather							
Feb. 18	at UNC Wilmington		Brooks Field • Wilmington, NC	Postponed to 2/19 due to inclement weather							
Feb. 19	at UNC Wilmington		Brooks Field • Wilmington, NC	**W** 4-3	**Abney** (1-0)	Bruno (0-1)	None		1,680	2-1	
Brittain Resorts Invitational
Feb. 21	Saint Joseph's		Springs Brooks Stadium • Conway, SC	**L** 2-4	DiValerio (2-0)	**McCambley** (1-1)	Stetzar (1)		1,725	2-2	
Feb. 22	Illinois		Springs Brooks Stadium • Conway, SC	**L** 2-5	Weber (2-0)	**Kobos** (0-2)	Acton (2)		1,806	2-3	
Feb. 23	Kennesaw State		Springs Brooks Stadium • Conway, SC	**W** 13-5	**Parker** (1-0)	Williams (1-1)	None		1,878	3-3	
Feb. 23	West Virginia		Springs Brooks Stadium • Conway, SC	**W** 14-2	**Green** (1-0)	Strechay (0-1)	None		2,162	4-3	
Feb. 26	at College of Charleston		CofC Baseball Stadium at Patriots Point • Charleston, SC	Game canceled due to inclement weather							
Feb. 28	Maryland		Springs Brooks Stadium • Conway, SC	**W** 16-0	**McCambley** (2-1)	Fisher (2-1)	None		1,997	5-3	
Feb. 29	Maryland		Springs Brooks Stadium • Conway, SC	**W** 10-3	**Abney** (2-0)	Dean (0-1)	None		2,078	6-3	

March (5-2)
Date	Opponent	Rank	Site/stadium	Score	Win	Loss	Save	TV	Attendance	Overall record	SBC record
Mar. 1	Maryland		Springs Brooks Stadium • Conway, SC	**W** 3-2	**Peavyhouse** (1-0)	Staine (0-1)	**Antle** (1)		2,069	7-3	
Mar. 3	Charlotte		Springs Brooks Stadium • Conway, SC	**W** 15-6	**Causey** (1-0)	Turnbull (0-1)	**Jarman** (1)		1,804	8-3	
Mar. 4	at No. 8 North Carolina State		Doak Field • Raleigh, NC	**L** 7-24	Pace (1-0)	**Blackwell** (0-1)	None		2,533	8-4	
Mar. 6	Middle Tennessee		Springs Brooks Stadium • Conway, SC	**W** 13-6	**McCambley** (3-1)	Brown (1-3)	None		1,637	9-4	
Mar. 7	Middle Tennessee		Springs Brooks Stadium • Conway, SC	**L** 5-12	Wigginton (1-1)	**Kobos** (0-3)	None		1,762	9-5	
Mar. 8	Middle Tennessee		Springs Brooks Stadium • Conway, SC	**W** 8-1	**Parker** (2-0)	Medlin (1-3)	None		1,826	10-5	
Mar. 11	Wake Forest		Springs Brooks Stadium • Conway, SC	**W** 10-4	**Kobos** (1-3)	McNamee (0-2)	None		1,903	11-5	
Mar. 13	at Louisiana		M. L. Tigue Moore Field at Russo Park • Lafayette, LA	Season suspended due to COVID-19 pandemic							
Mar. 14	at Louisiana		M. L. Tigue Moore Field at Russo Park • Lafayette, LA	Season suspended due to COVID-19 pandemic							
Mar. 15	at Louisiana		M. L. Tigue Moore Field at Russo Park • Lafayette, LA	Season suspended due to COVID-19 pandemic							
Mar. 17	Clemson		Springs Brooks Stadium • Conway, SC	Season suspended due to COVID-19 pandemic							
Mar. 20	Louisiana–Monroe		M. L. Tigue Moore Field at Russo Park • Lafayette, LA	Season suspended due to COVID-19 pandemic							
Mar. 21	Louisiana–Monroe		Beaver Field at Jim and Bettie Smith Stadium • Boone, NC	Season suspended due to COVID-19 pandemic							
Mar. 22	Louisiana–Monroe		Beaver Field at Jim and Bettie Smith Stadium • Boone, NC	Season suspended due to COVID-19 pandemic							
Mar. 24	at Clemson		Doug Kingsmore Stadium • Clemson, SC	Season suspended due to COVID-19 pandemic							
Mar. 27	at Texas State		Bobcat Ballpark • San Marcos, TX	Season suspended due to COVID-19 pandemic							
Mar. 28	at Texas State		Bobcat Ballpark • San Marcos, TX	Season suspended due to COVID-19 pandemic							
Mar. 29	at Texas State		Bobcat Ballpark • San Marcos, TX	Season suspended due to COVID-19 pandemic							
Mar. 31	at Charlotte		Robert and Mariam Hayes Stadium • Charlotte, NC	Season suspended due to COVID-19 pandemic							

April (0-0)
Date	Opponent	Rank	Site/stadium	Score	Win	Loss	Save	TV	Attendance	Overall record	SBC record
Apr. 3	South Alabama		Springs Brooks Stadium • Conway, SC	Season suspended due to COVID-19 pandemic							
Apr. 4	South Alabama		Springs Brooks Stadium • Conway, SC	Season suspended due to COVID-19 pandemic							
Apr. 5	South Alabama		Springs Brooks Stadium • Conway, SC	Season suspended due to COVID-19 pandemic							
Apr. 7	at UNC Wilmington		Brooks Field • Wilmington, NC	Season suspended due to COVID-19 pandemic							
Apr. 9	at Georgia Southern		J. I. Clements Stadium • Statesboro, GA	Season suspended due to COVID-19 pandemic							
Apr. 10	at Georgia Southern		J. I. Clements Stadium • Statesboro, GA	Season suspended due to COVID-19 pandemic							
Apr. 11	at Georgia Southern		J. I. Clements Stadium • Statesboro, GA	Season suspended due to COVID-19 pandemic							
Apr. 14	at North Carolina		Boshamer Stadium • Chapel Hill, NC	Season suspended due to COVID-19 pandemic							
Apr. 17	UT Arlington		Springs Brooks Stadium • Conway, SC	Season suspended due to COVID-19 pandemic							
Apr. 18	UT Arlington		Springs Brooks Stadium • Conway, SC	Season suspended due to COVID-19 pandemic							
Apr. 19	UT Arlington		Springs Brooks Stadium • Conway, SC	Season suspended due to COVID-19 pandemic							
Apr. 21	at Wake Forest		David F. Couch Ballpark • Winston-Salem, NC	Season suspended due to COVID-19 pandemic							
Apr. 24	at Troy		Riddle–Pace Field • Troy, AL	Season suspended due to COVID-19 pandemic							
Apr. 25	at Troy		Riddle–Pace Field • Troy, AL	Season suspended due to COVID-19 pandemic							
Apr. 26	at Troy		Riddle–Pace Field • Troy, AL	Season suspended due to COVID-19 pandemic							
Apr. 28	at No. 3 Georgia		Foley Field • Athens, GA	Season suspended due to COVID-19 pandemic							

May (0–0)
Date	Opponent	Rank	Site/stadium	Score	Win	Loss	Save	TV	Attendance	Overall record	SBC record
May 1	Georgia State		Springs Brooks Stadium • Conway, SC	Season suspended due to COVID-19 pandemic							
May 2	Georgia State		Springs Brooks Stadium • Conway, SC	Season suspended due to COVID-19 pandemic							
May 3	Georgia State		Springs Brooks Stadium • Conway, SC	Season suspended due to COVID-19 pandemic							
May 8	Little Rock		Springs Brooks Stadium • Conway, SC	Season suspended due to COVID-19 pandemic							
May 9	Little Rock		Springs Brooks Stadium • Conway, SC	Season suspended due to COVID-19 pandemic							
May 10	Little Rock		Springs Brooks Stadium • Conway, SC	Season suspended due to COVID-19 pandemic							
May 12	College of Charleston		Springs Brooks Stadium • Conway, SC	Season suspended due to COVID-19 pandemic							
May 14	at Appalachian State		Beaver Field at Jim and Bettie Smith Stadium • Boone, NC	Season suspended due to COVID-19 pandemic							
May 15	at Appalachian State		Beaver Field at Jim and Bettie Smith Stadium • Boone, NC	Season suspended due to COVID-19 pandemic							
May 16	at Appalachian State		Beaver Field at Jim and Bettie Smith Stadium • Boone, NC	Season suspended due to COVID-19 pandemic							

Postseason (0–0)

SBC Tournament (0–0)
Date	Opponent	Seed/Rank	Site/stadium	Score	Win	Loss	Save	TV	Attendance	Overall record	SBC record
May 20			Montgomery Riverwalk Stadium • Montgomery, AL	Tournament canceled due to COVID-19 pandemic							

Schedule source:

*Rankings are based on the team's current ranking in the D1Baseball poll.
