= Prothro =

Prothro is a surname. Notable people with the surname include:

- Chris Prothro (born 1982), American baseball coach and player
- Doc Prothro (1893–1971), American baseball player and manager
- Tommy Prothro (1920–1995), American football coach
- Tyrone Prothro (born 1984), American football player
