= Kermit Smith =

American college baseball coach

Current position
- Title: Head coach
- Team: Appalachian State
- Conference: Sun Belt
- Record: 196–249–1

Biographical details
- Born: Arcadia, Florida, U.S.

Playing career
- 1997–2000: Pfeiffer

Coaching career (HC unless noted)
- 2001: Belmont Abbey (asst.)
- 2002–2009: Belmont Abbey
- 2010–2016: Lander
- 2017–present: Appalachian State

Head coaching record
- Overall: 675–611–2
- Tournaments: Sun Belt: 6–6; NCAA: 0–0

Accomplishments and honors

Championships
- 2x Conference Carolinas Regular Season (2002,09); Conference Carolinas Conference Tournament (2009); Peach Belt Regular Season (2014); Peach Belt Conference Tournament (2014)

Awards
- Conference Carolinas Coach of the Year (2009); Peach Belt Coach of the Year (2014)

Kermit Smith is an American college baseball coach and former player. Smith is the head coach of the Appalachian State Mountaineers baseball team.

== Playing career ==
Smith attended Pfeiffer University, where he was a member of the Falcons baseball team.

== Coaching career ==
After a year as an assistant at Belmont Abbey College, Smith was named the head coach of the Crusaders at the age of 23. In 2009, Belmont Abbey advanced to the Division II College World Series where they finished 4th. Smith was named the Conference Carolinas Coach of the Year.

In 2009, Smith was named the head coach at Lander University. Smith lead the 2014 Bearcats squad to a school 52–9 season, winning the Peach Belt Conference Coach of the Year honors.

On July 14, 2016, Smith was named the head coach of the Appalachian State Mountaineers baseball program.

== Head coaching record ==
Statistics overview
Season	Team	Overall	Conference	Standing	Postseason
Belmont Abbey Crusaders (Conference Carolinas) (2002–2009)
2002	Belmont Abbey	35–20	17–8	T-1st	
2003	Belmont Abbey	18–28–1	8–13–1	8th	
2004	Belmont Abbey	12–42	5–19	9th	
2005	Belmont Abbey	28–30	9–15	7th	
2006	Belmont Abbey	24–34	13–11	T-4th	
2007	Belmont Abbey	31–23	16–7	2nd	
2008	Belmont Abbey	41–22	16–8	3rd	
2009	Belmont Abbey	46–26	14–5	1st	College World Series
Belmont Abbey Crusaders:		235–225–1	98–86–1		
Lander Bearcats (Peach Belt Conference) (2010–2016)
2010	Lander	24–26	6–18	5th	
2011	Lander	29–24	11–12	4th	
2012	Lander	38–20	18–12	4th	
2013	Lander	35–16	19–11	5th	
2014	Lander	52–9	24–6	1st	College World Series
2015	Lander	22–26	10–20	11th	
2016	Lander	44–16	22–8	2nd	College World Series
Lander Bearcats:		244–137	110–87		
Appalachian State Mountaineers (Sun Belt Conference) (2017–present)
2017	Appalachian State	19–36	8–22	6th (East)	
2018	Appalachian State	18–36	9–21	6th (East)	
2019	Appalachian State	22–31	13–16	5th (East)	
2020	Appalachian State	11–6	0–0	(East)	Season canceled due to COVID-19
2021	Appalachian State	21–31	11–10	4th (East)	Sun Belt Tournament
2022	Appalachian State	19–32	10–20	9th	
2023	Appalachian State	30–25	16–13	2nd (East)	Sun Belt Tournament
2024	Appalachian State	33–21-1	16–13-1	3rd (East)	Sun Belt Tournament
2025	Appalachian State	23–31	13–17	T–9th	Sun Belt Tournament
2026	Appalachian State	25–16	12–8		Sun Belt Tournament
Appalachian State:		221–265–1	108–140–1		
Total:		700–627–2			
National champion Postseason invitational champion Conference regular season champion Conference regular season and conference tournament champion Division regular season champion Division regular season and conference tournament champion Conference tournament champion

== See also ==
- List of current NCAA Division I baseball coaches
