= Chris Prothro =

American baseball coach and catcher

Biographical details
- Born: 1982 (age 43–44); Shreveport, Louisiana, U.S.

Playing career
- 2002: Northwestern State
- 2003: Crowder
- 2004–2005: Arkansas State
- Position: Catcher

Coaching career (HC unless noted)
- 2006–2007: North Iowa Area CC (H/C/OF)
- 2008–2015: Nicholls State (H/C/P/OF/AHC/RC)
- 2016–2020: South Alabama (H/RC)
- 2021–2024: Eastern Kentucky

Head coaching record
- Overall: 97–98
- Tournaments: ASUN: 4–3; NCAA: 0–0

Accomplishments and honors

Championships
- ASUN West Division (2022)

Chris Prothro (born 1982) is an American baseball coach and former catcher, who is the former head baseball coach of the Eastern Kentucky Colonels. He played college baseball at Northwestern State, Crowder College and Arkansas State for coach Keith Kessinger from 2004 to 2005.

== Coaching career ==
After his playing career ended, Prothro became an assistant baseball coach at North Iowa Area Community College, where he worked with hitters, catchers and outfielders.

Following two seasons at North Iowa, he joined the coaching staff of the Nicholls State Colonels where he was on the staff of his former head coach at Crowder, Chip Durham.

In July, 2015, Prothro was hired as the recruiting coordinator at South Alabama.

On September 30, 2020, Prothro was named the 8th head coach in the history of Eastern Kentucky.

Prothro announced on March 25, 2024, that he was taking a medical leave of absence from EKU effective immediately, with assistant coach Walt Jones serving as the acting head coach during his absence. On May 15, Prothro announced he will not return to the program and that Jones was named head coach moving forward.

== Head coaching record ==
Record table
Season	Team	Overall	Conference	Standing	Postseason
Eastern Kentucky Colonels (Ohio Valley Conference) (2021)
2021	Eastern Kentucky	21–32	13–17	T–9th	
Eastern Kentucky:			13–17		
Eastern Kentucky Colonels (ASUN Conference) (2022–2024)
2022	Eastern Kentucky	38–20	20–10	T-1st (West)	ASUN Tournament
2023	Eastern Kentucky	29–30	15–15	T-7th	ASUN Tournament
2024	Eastern Kentucky	9–16	5–1		
Eastern Kentucky:		97–98	40–26		
Total:		97–98			
National champion Postseason invitational champion Conference regular season champion Conference regular season and conference tournament champion Division regular season champion Division regular season and conference tournament champion Conference tournament champion
