= J. I. Clements Stadium =

Baseball venue in Statesboro, Georgia, US

- Clements Stadium
- Interactive map of J. I. Clements Stadium
- Location: 700 Fair Road, Statesboro, Georgia, US
- Coordinates: 32.429157°N 81.781368°W
- Owner: Georgia Southern University
- Capacity: 3,500
- Surface: Natural grass; Foul Territory Synthetic
- Record attendance: 3,732 (March 8, 2023)
- Field size: 330 ft. (LF), 360 ft. (LCF), 385 (CF), 360 ft. (RCF), 330 ft. (RF)

Construction
- Groundbreaking: May 2004
- Opened: February 12, 2005
- Renovated: 2017

Tenants
- Georgia Southern Eagles (Sun Belt) (2005–present)

J. I. Clements Stadium is a baseball venue located in Statesboro, Georgia, US. It is home to the Georgia Southern University Eagles college baseball team of the Division I Sun Belt Conference. It has a capacity of 3,000 spectators (530 chair-back seats and 2,470 stadium bench back seats) and opened in 2005.

The facility is named after former Georgia Southern baseball coach J. I. Clements. Clements coached the Eagles from 1949–1966 and 1968, leading the team to the 1962 NAIA National Championship. Clements died in 1974, and the Eagles' former venue was named in his honor in 1985. The name was carried over when the new stadium opened in 2005.

https://www.sportsfieldmanagement.org/baseball/

== Attendance ==
The park hosted its first game on February 12, 2005. Georgia Southern lost to No. 13 Georgia Tech 10–6. The game's attendance was 2,805. On February 22, 2011, the Eagles took on No. 21 Georgia Tech, and J. I. Clements Stadium saw a then-record crowd of 3,088 people. The Eagles won the game 6–5 on a walk-off walk by Victor Roache. On February 22, 2012, the Eagles hosted Georgia Tech and set a new single-game record attendance of 3,258. Georgia Tech won the game 11–9.

In 2013, the Eagles ranked 48th among Division I baseball programs in attendance, averaging 1,337 per home game.

== Features ==
The stadium features concessions, restrooms, dugouts, a batter's eye, luxury boxes, a press box, batting cages, offices, and a team meeting room. The Wiggins Baseball Building is located next to the field on the third base side. The facility encompasses 9,000 square feet (840 m^{2}).

== Renovations ==
The stadium was renovated during the 2016–2017 offseason in preparation to host the 2017 Sun Belt Conference baseball tournament. The outfield wall was replaced, a task hastened by damage caused by Hurricane Matthew. The old electronic scoreboard in left field was replaced with a Daktronics video board, and a hand-operated scoreboard was added in right field. The grass in foul territory was replaced by synthetic turf.

== Other uses ==
In addition to baseball, the field is occasionally used as a concert venue. On November 12, 2010, hip hop artist Ludacris performed at the stadium.

== See also ==
- List of NCAA Division I baseball venues
