= Georgia State Baseball Complex =

- Interactive map of Georgia State Baseball Complex
- Location: 2819 Clifton Springs Road, Decatur, GA, United States
- Coordinates: 33.68807°N 84.279591°W
- Capacity: 1,092
- Scoreboard: Electronic
- Field size: 334 ft. (LF), 385 ft. (CF), 338 ft. (RF)

Construction
- Opened: 1986
- Renovated: 2010, 2011

Tenants
- Georgia State Panthers baseball (Sun Belt) (1986–present); Marietta Patriots (SBL) (2021–present)

The Georgia State Baseball Complex is a baseball venue in Decatur, Georgia, United States. It is home to the Georgia State Panthers baseball team of the NCAA Division I Sun Belt Conference. The venue, which has a capacity of 1,092 spectators, opened in 1986.

== Features and renovations ==
The field's outfield fence, which was installed prior to the 1998 season, was taken from Atlanta–Fulton County Stadium, the former home of Major League Baseball's Atlanta Braves of nearby Atlanta. The fieldhouse located near the baseball field was dedicated to Bill and Susan Reeves in March 2003.

2010 renovations saw a new scoreboard installed and the playing surface redone. In 2011, the dugouts and locker rooms were renovated.

== Future ==
Georgia State plans to move from the Baseball Complex to a new park it plans to build within the footprint of the former Atlanta-Fulton County Stadium, the current Center Parc Stadium in downtown Atlanta. In 2016, after the Braves vacated Turner Field for SunTrust Park (later renamed Truist Park), the school bought Turner Field, including the former Atlanta-Fulton County Stadium site, which is currently a parking lot. No date has been set for construction of the new park.

== See also ==
- List of NCAA Division I baseball venues
