= Arkansas State Red Wolves baseball =

American intercollegiate baseball team

Arkansas State Red Wolves
- 2026 Arkansas State Red Wolves baseball team
- University: Arkansas State University
- Head coach: Mike Silva (2nd season)
- Conference: Sun Belt
- Location: Jonesboro, Arkansas
- Home stadium: Tomlinson Stadium–Kell Field (Capacity: 1,000)
- Nickname: Red Wolves
- Colors: Scarlet and black

NCAA tournament appearances
- Division II: 1968; Division I: 1994

Conference tournament champions
- Southland: 1967, 1968; Sun Belt: 1994

For information on all Arkansas State University sports, see Arkansas State Red Wolves

The Arkansas State Red Wolves baseball team (formerly the Arkansas State Indians) is the varsity college baseball team of Arkansas State University in Jonesboro, Arkansas, United States. The team is a member of the Sun Belt Conference, which is part of the National Collegiate Athletic Association's Division I. They participated in the first Division II baseball tournament in 1968, their only year in the tournament. The team plays its home games at Tomlinson Stadium–Kell Field in Jonesboro. The Red Wolves are coached by Mike Silva.

== Arkansas State in the NCAA Tournament ==
| Year | Record | Pct | Notes |
|---|---|---|---|
| 1994 | 2–2 | .500 | Central Regional |
| TOTALS | 2–2 | .500 | |

== See also ==
- List of NCAA Division I baseball programs
