= Troy Trojans baseball statistical leaders =

The Troy Trojans baseball statistical leaders are individual statistical leaders of the Troy Trojans baseball program in various categories, including batting average, home runs, runs batted in, runs, hits, stolen bases, ERA, and Strikeouts. Within those areas, the lists identify single-game, single-season, and career leaders. The Trojans represent Troy University in the NCAA's Sun Belt Conference.

Troy began competing in intercollegiate baseball in 1911. These lists are updated through the end of the 2025 season.

== Batting Average ==
Career
| Rk | Player | AVG | Seasons |
|---|---|---|---|
| 1 | Tom King | .411 | 2006 |
| 2 | Wendell Stephens | .391 | 1985 1986 |
| 3 | Keith Bragg | .389 | 1982 1983 |
| 4 | Mark Smartt | .379 | 1986 1987 |
| 5 | Vince Kindred | .376 | 1985 1986 |
| | Michael Rivera | .376 | 1996 |
| 7 | Jude Rinaldi | .374 | 1986 1987 |
| | Adam Godwin | .374 | 2004 2005 |
| 9 | Casey Smith | .373 | 2000 2001 |
| 10 | Scott Ates | .372 | 1989 1990 |

Season
| Rk | Player | AVG | Season |
|---|---|---|---|
| 1 | Jude Rinaldi | .431 | 1987 |
| 2 | Vince Kindred | .427 | 1986 |
| 3 | Bobby Boswell | .416 | 1972 |
| 4 | Tom King | .411 | 2006 |
| 5 | Dirk Williams | .410 | 1989 |
| 6 | Mark Smartt | .405 | 1986 |
| 7 | Keith Bragg | .404 | 1983 |
| | Casey Smith | .404 | 2000 |
| 9 | Bryan Miller | .400 | 2008 |
| 10 | Wendell Stephens | .396 | 1985 |

== Home Runs ==
Career
| Rk | Player | HR | Seasons |
|---|---|---|---|
| 1 | Jorge Soto | 65 | 1997 1998 1999 |
| 2 | Dave Banks | 46 | 1982 1983 1984 1985 |
| 3 | Tom Gregorio | 41 | 1996 1997 1998 1999 |
| | Adam Bryant | 41 | 2008 2009 2010 2011 |
| 5 | Shane Lewis | 40 | 2023 2024 2025 |
| 6 | Clint Robinson | 37 | 2004 2005 2006 2007 |
| 7 | Glen Willis | 36 | 1985 1986 1987 1988 |
| 8 | Brian Lipman | 35 | 2001 2002 2003 |
| 9 | Brooks Bryan | 34 | 2023 2024 2025 |
| 10 | Drew Frederic | 30 | 2017 2018 2019 2020 2021 |

Season
| Rk | Player | HR | Season |
|---|---|---|---|
| 1 | Shane Lewis | 27 | 2023 |
| 2 | Jorge Soto | 26 | 1999 |
| 3 | Jorge Soto | 23 | 1998 |
| | Adam Bryant | 23 | 2010 |
| 5 | Kevan Burns | 22 | 1999 |
| 6 | Michael Rivera | 21 | 1996 |
| | Jimmy Janicki | 21 | 2026 |
| 8 | Dave Banks | 19 | 1984 |
| | Joel Smith | 19 | 1990 |
| 10 | Trae Santos | 18 | 2013 |
| | Henry Gutierrez | 18 | 2005/ |
| | Ryan Ditthardt | 18 | 2010 |
| | Brooks Bryan | 18 | 2024 |

Single Game
| Rk | Player | HR | Season | Opponent |
|---|---|---|---|---|
| 1 | Scott Ates | 4 | 1990 | Valparaiso |

== Runs Batted In ==
Career
| Rk | Player | RBI | Seasons |
|---|---|---|---|
| 1 | Jorge Soto | 196 | 1997 1998 1999 |
| 2 | Adam Bryant | 187 | 2008 2009 2010 2011 |
| 3 | Clint Robinson | 178 | 2004 2005 2006 2007 |
| 4 | Dave Banks | 159 | 1982 1983 1984 1985 |
| 5 | Brooks Bryan | 158 | 2023 2024 2025 |
| 6 | Logan Pierce | 153 | 2011 2012 2013 |
| 7 | Drew Frederic | 150 | 2017 2018 2019 2020 2021 |
| 8 | Caleb Bartolero | 149 | 2019 2020 2021 2022 2023 |
| 9 | Wade Miller | 142 | 2001 2002 2003 2004 |
| 10 | Tom Gregorio | 141 | 1996 1997 1998 1999 |

Season
| Rk | Player | RBI | Season |
|---|---|---|---|
| 1 | Jimmy Janicki | 87 | 2026 |
| 2 | Brooks Bryan | 85 | 2024 |
| 3 | Joey Denison | 81 | 2018 |
| 4 | Shane Lewis | 77 | 2023 |
| 5 | Tom King | 73 | 2006 |
| | Will Butcher | 73 | 2024 |
| 7 | Jorge Soto | 72 | 1999 |
| 8 | Clint Robinson | 71 | 2007 |
| 9 | Trae Santos | 70 | 2013 |
| 10 | Bryan Kelly | 69 | 1997 |

Single Game
| Rk | Player | RBI | Season | Opponent |
|---|---|---|---|---|
| 1 | Stacy Gillispie | 10 | 1999 | Stetson |

== Runs ==
Career
| Rk | Player | R | Seasons |
|---|---|---|---|
| 1 | Drew Frederic | 212 | 2017 2018 2019 2020 2021 |
| 2 | Matt Sanders | 190 | 2015 2016 2017 2018 |
| 3 | Adam Bryant | 184 | 2008 2009 2010 2011 |
| 4 | Clint Robinson | 169 | 2004 2005 2006 2007 |
| 5 | Steven Felix | 164 | 2007 2008 2009 2010 |
| 6 | Rigsby Mosley | 161 | 2018 2019 2020 2021 2022 |
| 7 | Dave Banks | 158 | 1982 1983 1984 1985 |
| 8 | Logan Pierce | 147 | 2011 2012 2013 |
| | Kenny Krey | 147 | 1996 1997 1998 |
| 10 | Jorge Soto | 144 | 1997 1998 1999 |

Season
| Rk | Player | R | Season |
|---|---|---|---|
| 1 | Matt Sanders | 90 | 2018 |
| 2 | Kole Myers | 81 | 2024 |
| 3 | Tom King | 75 | 2006 |
| 4 | Warren Arrington | 73 | 1986 |
| | Jason Borghese | 73 | 1998 |
| 6 | Tyler Vaughn | 72 | 2013 |
| 7 | Kevan Burns | 71 | 1999 |
| 8 | Adam Bryant | 70 | 2010 |
| 9 | Steven Felix | 69 | 2010 |
| 10 | Jimmy Janicki | 67 | 2026 |

Single Game
| Rk | Player | R | Season | Opponent |
|---|---|---|---|---|
| 1 | Ricky Rowe | 7 | 1999 | Stetson |

== Hits ==
Career
| Rk | Player | H | Seasons |
|---|---|---|---|
| 1 | Drew Frederic | 296 | 2017 2018 2019 2020 2021 |
| 2 | Adam Bryant | 276 | 2008 2009 2010 2011 |
| 3 | Matt Sanders | 269 | 2015 2016 2017 2018 |
| 4 | Clint Robinson | 257 | 2004 2005 2006 2007 |
| 5 | Rigsby Mosley | 251 | 2018 2019 2020 2021 2022 |
| 6 | Brandon Lockridge | 219 | 2016 2017 2018 |
| 7 | Caleb Bartolero | 214 | 2019 2020 2021 2022 2023 |
| | Chase Smartt | 214 | 2016 2017 2018 2019 |
| 9 | Logan Pierce | 213 | 2011 2012 2013 |
| | Wade Miller | 213 | 2001 2002 2003 2004 |

Season
| Rk | Player | H | Season |
|---|---|---|---|
| 1 | Tom King | 117 | 2006 |
| 2 | Bryan Miller | 102 | 2008 |
| 3 | Matt Sanders | 99 | 2018 |
| 4 | Joey Denison | 97 | 2018 |
| | Jimmy Janicki | 97 | 2026 |
| 6 | Aaron Piasecki | 95 | 2026 |
| 7 | Adam Bryant | 91 | 2011 |
| 8 | Adam Godwin | 90 | 2005 |
| 9 | Adam Bryant | 89 | 2010 |
| 10 | Logan Pierce | 88 | 2013 |
| | Casey Smith | 88 | 2000 |

Single Game
| Rk | Player | H | Season | Opponent |
|---|---|---|---|---|
| 1 | Stacy Gillispie | 7 | 1999 | Stetson |

== Stolen Bases ==
Career
| Rk | Player | SB | Seasons |
|---|---|---|---|
| 1 | Adam Godwin | 112 | 2004 2005 |
| 2 | Drew Frederic | 84 | 2017 2018 2019 2020 2021 |
| 3 | Mike Austin | 74 | 1981 1982 |
| 4 | Junior Shumpert | 73 | 1989 1990 |
| 5 | Clay Holcomb | 70 | 2012 2013 2014 2015 |
| 6 | Ricky Rowe | 67 | 1998 1999 |
| 7 | Warren Arrington | 66 | 1986 1987 |
| 8 | Tracy Lee | 58 | 1990 1991 |
| 9 | Jeff Brinson | 56 | 1982 1983 1984 1985 |
| 10 | Keith Black | 55 | 1988 1989 1990 1991 |
| | Kole Myers | 55 | 2023 2024 |

Season
| Rk | Player | SB | Season |
|---|---|---|---|
| 1 | Adam Godwin | 84 | 2005 |
| 2 | Warren Arrington | 46 | 1986 |
| 3 | Junior Shumpert | 41 | 1990 |
| 4 | Michael Austin | 37 | 1981 |
| | Ricky Rowe | 37 | 1998 |
| 6 | Vince Kindred | 35 | 1986 |
| | Tracy Lee | 35 | 1991 |
| 8 | Kole Myers | 34 | 2024 |
| 9 | Junior Shumpert | 32 | 1989 |
| 10 | Richard Pope | 30 | 1986 |
| | James Graves | 30 | 1994 |
| | Ricky Rowe | 30 | 1999 |

== Earned Run Average ==
Career
| Rk | Player | ERA | Seasons |
|---|---|---|---|
| 1 | Ron Pierce | 1.88 | 1976 1977 |
| 2 | Andrew Crane | 2.25 | 2017 2018 |
| 3 | Mike Perez | 2.26 | 1986 |
| 4 | Danny Cox | 2.31 | 1980 1981 |
| 5 | Andy Giannini | 2.49 | 1978 1979 |
| 6 | James Wray | 2.51 | 1987 1988 |
| 7 | Grant Bennett | 2.72 | 2015 2016 |
| 8 | Josh Dew | 2.74 | 2006 2007 |
| 9 | Ron Warren | 2.78 | 1985 1986 |
| 10 | Marc Skinner | 2.82 | 2014 2015 2016 2017 |

Season
| Rk | Player | ERA | Season |
|---|---|---|---|
| 1 | Stoney Melton | 1.07 | 1990 |
| 2 | Nate Moore | 1.25 | 2004 |
| 3 | Danny Cox | 1.30 | 1981 |
| 4 | Steve Charles | 1.40 | 1993 |
| 5 | Andrew Crane | 1.47 | 2017 |
| 6 | Marc Skinner | 1.52 | 2014 |
| 7 | Ron Pierce | 1.80 | 1977 |
| 8 | Levi Thomas | 1.96 | 2018 |
| 9 | Ron Pierce | 1.98 | 1976 |
| 10 | James Wray | 2.02 | 1987 |

== Strikeouts ==
Career
| Rk | Player | K | Seasons |
|---|---|---|---|
| 1 | Jason Fawcett | 425 | 1994 1995 1996 1997 |
| 2 | Shane McCain | 273 | 2010 2011 2012 2013 2014 |
| 3 | Garrett Gainous | 262 | 2021 2022 2023 2024 2025 |
| 4 | Tyler Ray | 259 | 2009 2010 2011 2012 |
| 5 | Grayson Stewart | 251 | 2022 2023 2024 2025 |
| 6 | Nate Hill | 230 | 2011 2012 2013 |
| 7 | Eric Wikstrom | 224 | 2001 2002 2003 2004 |
| 8 | Shawn Pyles | 216 | 1994 1995 1996 1997 |
| 9 | Ryan Ellison | 207 | 2005 2006 2007 2008 |
| 10 | Donnie Elsberry | 195 | 1976 1977 1978 1979 |

Season
| Rk | Player | K | Season |
|---|---|---|---|
| 1 | Jason Fawcett | 141 | 1997 |
| 2 | Mike Felix | 134 | 2006 |
| 3 | Landon Brazell | 126 | 2005 |
| 4 | Mike Perez | 114 | 1986 |
| 5 | Jason Fawcett | 112 | 1995 |
| 6 | Ron Warren | 108 | 1986 |
| | Jason Russ | 108 | 1999 |
| 8 | Ward Thigpen | 107 | 1990 |
| 9 | Shane McCain | 105 | 2013 |
| 10 | Brent Adcock | 104 | 2005 |

Single Game
| Rk | Player | K | Season | Opponent |
|---|---|---|---|---|
| 1 | Bill Harken | 17 | 1961 | Huntingdon |
