= 2017 Little Rock Trojans baseball team =

American college baseball season

2017 Little Rock Trojans baseball
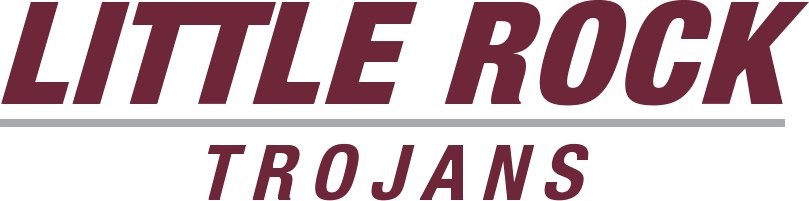
- Conference: Sun Belt Conference
- West Division
- Record: 21–34 (11–18 SBC)
- Head coach: Chris Curry (3rd season)
- Assistant coaches: Russell Raley; Mike Silva
- Home stadium: Gary Hogan Field

2017 Sun Belt Conference baseball standings
| | Conf. | | | | | | Overall |
| Team | W | | L | | T | PCT | W | | L | | T | PCT |
|---|---|---|---|---|---|---|---|---|---|---|---|---|
East Division
| Coastal Carolina^{x}^{†} ‍‍‍ | 22 | – | 7 | – | 1 | .750 | 37 | – | 19 | – | 1 | .658 |
| No. 26 South Alabama^{‡}^{y} ‍‍‍ | 22 | – | 8 | – | 0 | .733 | 40 | – | 21 | – | 0 | .656 |
| Georgia Southern ‍‍‍ | 18 | – | 12 | – | 0 | .600 | 38 | – | 21 | – | 0 | .644 |
| Troy ‍‍‍ | 16 | – | 14 | – | 0 | .533 | 31 | – | 25 | – | 0 | .554 |
| Georgia State ‍‍‍ | 10 | – | 20 | – | 0 | .333 | 22 | – | 33 | – | 0 | .400 |
| Appalachian State ‍‍‍ | 8 | – | 22 | – | 0 | .267 | 19 | – | 36 | – | 0 | .345 |
West Division
| UT Arlington^{x} ‍‍‍ | 20 | – | 10 | – | 0 | .667 | 30 | – | 25 | – | 0 | .545 |
| Louisiana–Lafayette ‍‍‍ | 19 | – | 10 | – | 1 | .650 | 35 | – | 21 | – | 1 | .623 |
| Arkansas State ‍‍‍ | 13 | – | 16 | – | 0 | .448 | 28 | – | 27 | – | 0 | .509 |
| Texas State ‍‍‍ | 13 | – | 17 | – | 0 | .433 | 29 | – | 30 | – | 0 | .492 |
| Little Rock ‍‍‍ | 11 | – | 18 | – | 0 | .379 | 21 | – | 34 | – | 0 | .382 |
| Louisiana–Monroe ‍‍‍ | 6 | – | 24 | – | 0 | .200 | 12 | – | 43 | – | 0 | .218 |
x – Division champion † – Conference champion ‡ – Tournament champion y – Invited to the NCAA tournament Rankings from Collegiate Baseball

The 2017 Little Rock Trojans baseball team represented the University of Arkansas at Little Rock during the 2017 NCAA Division I baseball season. The Trojans played their home games at Gary Hogan Field and were coached by third year head coach Chris Curry. They were members of the Sun Belt Conference.

== Roster ==
2017 Little Rock Trojans roster
| Pitchers: 4 Ryan Lemoine - Junior; 10 Cory Malcom - Senior; 12 Zach Ours - Sophomore; 13 Dylan Slayton - Senior; 14 Justin Garcia - Junior; 17 Corbin Osburn - Junior; 24 Jacob Boggess - Redshirt Junior; 27 Reed Willenborg - Senior; 29 Chandler Fidel - Freshman; 30 Cody McGill - Senior; 32 Joe Corbett - Sophomore; 33 Keenan Wingfield - Senior; 34 Cole Townsend - Redshirt Junior; 36 Jacob Rateliff - Senior; 37 Carter Brown - Freshman; 38 Preston Oberling - Junior; 39 McKinley Moore - Freshman; 40 Cody Daylor - Senior; 44 Matt McDowell - Redshirt Senior | Catchers: 7 Cameron Knight - Senior; 19 Kale Emshoff - Freshman; 23 Dalton Thomas - Senior; 31 Jonathan Davis - Sophomore; Infielders: 1 Christian Reyes - Sophomore; 2 Ty Gunter - Senior; 6 Zach Baker - Senior; 16 Cale Ridling - Redshirt Freshman; 18 Bryce Dimitroff - Junior; 21 Riley Pittman - Sophomore; 22 Nik Gifford - Senior; 25 Paul Benitez - Freshman; 41 Justin Cooper - Freshman; Outfielders: 5 Keegan Meyn - Sophomore; 9 Hunter Owens - Senior; 26 Danny Mitchell Jr. - Redshirt Freshman |

=== Coaching staff ===
2017 Little Rock Trojans coaching staff
- Chris Curry – Head Coach – 3rd year
- Russell Raley – Assistant Head Coach – 3rd year
- Mike Silva – Assistant Head Coach – 1st year
- Matt Farmer – Volunteer Assistant Coach – 2nd year

== Schedule and results ==
Little Rock Trojans announced its 2017 baseball schedule on October 24, 2016. The 2017 schedule consists of 28 home and 27 away games in the regular season. The Trojans hosted Sun Belts foes Appalachian State, Georgia State, Louisiana, Texas State, and Troy and traveled to Arkansas State, Georgia Southern, Louisiana–Monroe, South Alabama, and Texas-Arlington.

The 2017 Sun Belt Conference Championship was contested May 24–28 in Statesboro, Georgia, and was hosted by Georgia Southern.

Legend
| | Little Rock win |
| | Little Rock loss |
| | Postponement/Cancelation/Suspensions |
| **Bold** | Little Rock team member |

2017 Little Rock Trojans baseball game log
Regular season (21–33)

February (2–6)
| Date | Opponent | Rank | Site | Score | Win | Loss | Save | TV | Attendance | Overall record | SBC record |
|---|---|---|---|---|---|---|---|---|---|---|---|
| Feb. 17 | at Oral Roberts | | J. L. Johnson Stadium • Tulsa, OK | **L** 4–10 | McGregor (1–0) | **McDowell** (0–1) | None | | 718 | 0–1 | |
| Feb. 18 | at Oral Roberts | | J. L. Johnson Stadium • Tulsa, OK | **L** 3–4^{13 inn} | Stout (1–0) | **Wingfield** (0–1) | None | | 781 | 0–2 | |
| Feb. 19 | at Oral Roberts | | J. L. Johnson Stadium • Tulsa, OK | **L** 3–8 | Ausua (1–0) | **Fidel** (0–1) | McCollough (1) | | 756 | 0–3 | – |
| Feb. 22 | at Louisiana Tech | | J. C. Love Field • Ruston, LA | **L** 2–4 | Harris (1–0) | **Wingfield** (0–1) | None | | 1,217 | 0–4 | |
| Feb. 24 | Purdue | | Gary Hogan Field • Little Rock, AR | **L** 4–6 | Andrews (2–0) | **McDowell** (0–2) | **Parker** (1) | | 324 | 0–5 | |
| Feb. 25 | Purdue | | Gary Hogan Field • Little Rock, AR | **W** 2–0 | **Malcom** (1–0) | Stroh (0–1) | None | | 389 | 1–5 | |
| Feb. 26 | Purdue | | Gary Hogan Field • Little Rock, AR | **W** 13–0 | **Fidel** (1–1) | Schumacher (0–1) | None | | 263 | 2–5 | |
| Feb. 28 | at No. 18 Oklahoma | | L. Dale Mitchell Baseball Park • Norman, OK | **L** 5–10 | Wiles (2–0) | **McDowell** (0–3) | None | FSSW | 721 | 2–6 | |

March (8–10)
| Date | Opponent | Rank | Site | Score | Win | Loss | Save | TV | Attendance | Overall record | SBC record |
|---|---|---|---|---|---|---|---|---|---|---|---|
| Mar. 3 | Fort Wayne | | Gary Hogan Field • Little Rock, AR | **W** 17–2 | **Brown** (1–0) | Weber (0–1) | None | | 207 | 3–6 | |
| Mar. 4 | Fort Wayne | | Gary Hogan Field • Little Rock, AR | **W** 17–2 | **Brown** (1–0) | Weber (0–1) | None | | 207 | 4–6 | |
| Mar. 4 | Fort Wayne | | Gary Hogan Field • Little Rock, AR | **W** 3–2 | **Corbett** (1–0) | Boyd (0–1) | None | | | 5–6 | |
| Mar. 5 | Fort Wayne | | Gary Hogan Field • Little Rock, AR | **W** 5–1 | **Townsend** (1–0) | Ley (1–1) | None | | 207 | 6–6 | |
| Mar. 8 | Oral Roberts | | Gary Hogan Field • Little Rock, AR | **L** 1–8 | Michaels (1–0) | **McDowell** (0–4) | None | | 205 | 6–7 | |
| Mar. 10 | at Stephen F. Austin | | Jaycees Field • Nacogdoches, TX | **L** 4–6 | Vest (1–0) | **LeMoine** (0–1) | None | | 178 | 6–8 | |
| Mar. 11 | at Stephen F. Austin | | Jaycees Field • Nacogdoches, TX | **W** 8–3 | **Townsend** (2–0) | Hagy (0–3) | None | | 162 | 7–8 | |
| Mar. 12 | at Stephen F. Austin | | Jaycees Field • Nacogdoches, TX | **L** 2–5 | Ledet (1–2) | **Fidel** (1–2) | Starks (3) | | 176 | 7–9 | |
| Mar. 14 | at Central Arkansas | | Bear Stadium • Conway, AR | **L** 3–12 | Brand (2–1) | **McDowell** (0–5) | None | | 145 | 7–10 | |
| Mar. 17 | Troy | | Gary Hogan Field • Little Rock, AR | **L** 6–7 | Osby (4–1) | **Malcom** (1–1) | Skinner (4) | | 227 | 7–11 | 0–1 |
| Mar. 18 | Troy | | Gary Hogan Field • Little Rock, AR | **L** 3–6 | Crook (3–0) | **LeMoine** (0–2) | Skinner (5) | | 275 | 7–12 | 0–2 |
| Mar. 19 | Troy | | Gary Hogan Field • Little Rock, AR | **W** 10–3 | **Fidel** (2–2) | Mabray (1–1) | None | | 261 | 8–12 | 1–2 |
| Mar. 21 | at No. 5 Missouri | | Taylor Stadium • Columbia, MO | **L** 8–11 | Montes (2–0) | **Brown** (1–1) | Sharp (1) | SECN+ | 672 | 8–13 | |
| Mar. 24 | at Louisiana-Monroe | | Warhawk Field • Monroe, LA | **W** 5–1 | **Malcom** (2–1) | Leone (1–2) | None | | 746 | 9–13 | 2–2 |
| Mar. 25 | at Louisiana-Monroe | | Warhawk Field • Monroe, LA | **L** 4–6 | Beal (2–2) | **Townsend** (2–1) | Herrera (3) | | 824 | 9–14 | 2–3 |
| Mar. 26 | at Louisiana-Monroe | | Warhawk Field • Monroe, LA | **L** 1–7 | Curtis (1–3) | **Fidel** (2–3) | None | | 732 | 9–15 | 2–4 |
| March 28 | at No. 23 Ole Miss | | Swayze Field • Oxford, MS | **L** 4–5 ^{10 inn} | Roth (1–0) | **Moore** (0–1) | None | | 6,709 | 9–16 | |
| Mar. 31 | Appalachian State | | Gary Hogan Field • Little Rock, AR | **W** 6–2 | **Slayton** (2–0) | Holden (1–4) | None | | 280 | 10–16 | 3–4 |

April (6–12)
| Date | Opponent | Rank | Site | Score | Win | Loss | Save | TV | Attendance | Overall record | SBC record |
|---|---|---|---|---|---|---|---|---|---|---|---|
| April 1 | Appalachian State | | Gary Hogan Field • Little Rock, AR | **L** 2–3 | Schmid (4–3) | **LeMoine** (0–3) | Howell (4) | | | 10–17 | 3–5 |
| April 2 | Appalachian State | | Gary Hogan Field • Little Rock, AR | **L** 6–7 | Brill (1–3) | **Slayton** (2–1) | None | | 253 | 10–18 | 3–6 |
| April 4 | Arkansas–Pine Bluff | | Gary Hogan Field • Little Rock, AR | **L** 1–2 | Shindlebower (1–0) | **Ours** (0–1) | Waters (1) | | 236 | 10–19 | |
| April 7 | Texas State | | Gary Hogan Field • Little Rock, AR | **L** 3–7 | Reich (2–2) | **Malcom** (2–2) | None | | 252 | 10–20 | 3–7 |
| April 8 | Texas State | | Gary Hogan Field • Little Rock, AR | **W** 9–4 | **LeMoine** (1–3) | Engle (2–1) | **Garcia** (1) | | 301 | 11–20 | 4–7 |
| April 9 | Texas State | | Gary Hogan Field • Little Rock, AR | **W** 6–5 | **Slayton** (3–1) | Walden (5–1) | None | | 239 | 12–20 | 5–7 |
| April 11 | Stephen F. Austin | | Gary Hogan Field • Little Rock, AR | **W** 10–4 | **Brown** (2–1) | Nouis (1–2) | None | | 192 | 13–20 | |
| April 13 | at RV UT Arlington | | Clay Gould Ballpark • Arlington, TX | **L** 0–2 | Simmons (5–2) | **Malcom** (2–3) | James (8) | | 313 | 13–21 | 5–8 |
| April 14 | at RV UT Arlington | | Clay Gould Ballpark • Arlington, TX | **W** 9–4 | **Garcia** (1–0) | Patterson (3–3) | None | | 472 | 14–21 | 6–8 |
| April 15 | at RV UT Arlington | | Clay Gould Ballpark • Arlington, TX | **L** 5–10 | Gardner (1–1) | **Fidel** (2–4) | None | | 464 | 14–22 | 6–9 |
| April 19 | Louisiana Tech | | Gary Hogan Field • Little Rock, AR | **L** 6–10 | Griffen (2–1) | **Fidel** (2–5) | None | | 238 | 14–23 | |
| April 21 | RV Louisiana–Lafayette | | Gary Hogan Field • Little Rock, AR | **L** 4–9 | Leger (8–1) | **LeMoine** (1–4) | None | | 403 | 14–24 | 6–10 |
| April 22 | RV Louisiana–Lafayette | | Gary Hogan Field • Little Rock, AR | **L** 4–7 | Lee (5–3) | **Malcom** (2–4) | Marks (5) | | 403 | 14–25 | 6–11 |
| April 23 | RV Louisiana–Lafayette | | Gary Hogan Field • Little Rock, AR | **L** 3–5 | Moore (1–1) | **Slayton** (3–2) | None | | 243 | 14–26 | 6–12 |
| April 25 | vs. Central Arkansas | | Dickey-Stephens Park • North Little Rock, Arkansas | **W** 11–6 | **Osburn** (1–0) | Tillery (0–1) | **Garcia** (2) | | 1,026 | 15–26 | |
| April 28 | at Georgia Southern | | J. I. Clements Stadium • Statesboro, GA | **W** 11–4 | **LeMoine** (2–4) | Condra–Bogan (4–2) | None | | 916 | 16–26 | 7–12 |
| April 29 | at Georgia Southern | | J. I. Clements Stadium • Statesboro, GA | **L** 0–5 | Challenger (2–4) | **Malcom** (2–5) | None | | 1,133 | 16–27 | 7–13 |
| April 30 | at Georgia Southern | | J. I. Clements Stadium • Statesboro, GA | **L** 2–9 | Cohen (3–3) | **Fidel** (2–6) | None | | 698 | 16–28 | 7–14 |

May (5–5)
| Date | Opponent | Rank | Site | Score | Win | Loss | Save | TV | Attendance | Overall record | SBC record |
|---|---|---|---|---|---|---|---|---|---|---|---|
| May 5 | at South Alabama | | Eddie Stanky Field • Mobile, AL | **L** 3–8 | Bell (5–3) | **LeMoine** (2–5) | Peacock (7) | | 1,276 | 16–29 | 7–15 |
| May 6 | at South Alabama | | Eddie Stanky Field • Mobile, AL | **W** 11–5 | **Malcom** (3–5) | Huston (5–3) | None | | 1,492 | 17–29 | 8–15 |
| May 7 | at South Alabama | | Eddie Stanky Field • Mobile, AL | **L** 3–5 | Carr (4–1) | **Fidel** (2–7) | Peacock (8) | | 1,229 | 17–30 | 8–16 |
| May 9 | Northwestern State | | Gary Hogan Field • Little Rock, AR | **W** 13–1 | **Brown** (3–1) | Winders (1–5) | None | | 221 | 18–30 | |
| May 13 | Georgia State | | Gary Hogan Field • Little Rock, AR | **W** 8–3 | **Malcom** (4–5) | White (1–3) | None | | | 19–30 | 9–16 |
| May 13 | Georgia State | | Gary Hogan Field • Little Rock, AR | **W** 6–4 | **Garcia** (2–0) | Harper (1–2) | None | | 299 | 20–30 | 10–16 |
| May 14 | Georgia State | | Gary Hogan Field • Little Rock, AR | **W** 16–1 ^{7 inn} | **Fidel** (3–7) | Conley (2–7) | None | | 313 | 21–30 | 11–16 |
| May 18 | Central Arkansas | | Gary Hogan Field • Little Rock, AR | **L** 8–9 ^{18 inn} | Welsh (4–2) | **Moore** (0–2) | None | | 337 | 21–31 | 11–17 |
| May 19 | at Arkansas State | | Tomlinson Stadium–Kell Field • Jonesboro, AR | **L** 2–19 | Culbertson (5–7) | **LeMoine** (2–6) | None | | 306 | 21–32 | 11–18 |
| May 20 | at Arkansas State | | Tomlinson Stadium–Kell Field • Jonesboro, AR | Cancelled due to inclement weather | | | | | | | |

Postseason (0–1)

SBC Tournament
| Date | Opponent | Rank | Site | Score | Win | Loss | Save | TV | Attendance | Overall record | SBCT Record |
|---|---|---|---|---|---|---|---|---|---|---|---|
| May 25 | vs. Texas State | | J. I. Clements Stadium • Statesboro, GA | **L** 2–3 | Theriot (6–1) | **Garcia** (2–1) | None | | 335 | 21–33 | 0–1 |

- Rankings are based on the team's current ranking in the Collegiate Baseball poll.
