= 2017 UT Arlington Mavericks baseball team =

American college baseball season

2017 Texas–Arlington Mavericks baseball

Sun Belt West Division champion
- Conference: Sun Belt Conference
- West Division
- Record: 30–25 (20–10 SBC)
- Head coach: Darin Thomas (10th season)
- Home stadium: Clay Gould Ballpark

2017 Sun Belt Conference baseball standings
	Conf.						Overall
Team	W		L		T	PCT	W		L		T	PCT
East Division
Coastal Carolina^{x}^{†} ‍‍‍	22	–	7	–	1	.750	37	–	19	–	1	.658
No. 26 South Alabama^{‡}^{y} ‍‍‍	22	–	8	–	0	.733	40	–	21	–	0	.656
Georgia Southern ‍‍‍	18	–	12	–	0	.600	38	–	21	–	0	.644
Troy ‍‍‍	16	–	14	–	0	.533	31	–	25	–	0	.554
Georgia State ‍‍‍	10	–	20	–	0	.333	22	–	33	–	0	.400
Appalachian State ‍‍‍	8	–	22	–	0	.267	19	–	36	–	0	.345
West Division
UT Arlington^{x} ‍‍‍	20	–	10	–	0	.667	30	–	25	–	0	.545
Louisiana–Lafayette ‍‍‍	19	–	10	–	1	.650	35	–	21	–	1	.623
Arkansas State ‍‍‍	13	–	16	–	0	.448	28	–	27	–	0	.509
Texas State ‍‍‍	13	–	17	–	0	.433	29	–	30	–	0	.492
Little Rock ‍‍‍	11	–	18	–	0	.379	21	–	34	–	0	.382
Louisiana–Monroe ‍‍‍	6	–	24	–	0	.200	12	–	43	–	0	.218
x – Division champion † – Conference champion ‡ – Tournament champion y – Invited to the NCAA tournament Rankings from Collegiate Baseball

The 2017 Texas–Arlington Mavericks baseball team represented the University of Texas at Arlington in the 2017 NCAA Division I baseball season. The Mavericks played their home games at Clay Gould Ballpark.

== Schedule and results ==
Texas–Arlington Mavericks announced their 2017 baseball schedule on November 4, 2016. The 2017 schedule consisted of 26 home and 29 away games in the regular season. The Mavericks hosted Sun Belt foes Coastal Carolina, Georgia Southern, Little Rock, Louisiana, and Troy and traveled to Appalachian State, Arkansas State, Georgia State, Louisiana–Monroe, and Texas State.

The 2017 Sun Belt Conference Championship was contested May 24–28 in Statesboro, Georgia, and was hosted by Georgia Southern.

Texas-Arlington finished first in the west division of the conference which qualified the Mavericks to compete in the tournament as the second seed, seeking the team's 1st Sun Belt Conference tournament title.

2017 Texas–Arlington Mavericks baseball game log
Regular season (30–24)

February (2–7)
Date	Opponent	Rank	Site	Score	Attendance	Overall record	SBC record
Feb. 17	vs. Southeast Missouri State		Jaycees Field • Nacogdoches, TX	L 4–3	150	0–1	–
Feb. 18	at Stephen F. Austin		Jaycees Field • Nacogdoches, TX	L 2–1^{10}	349	0–2	–
Feb. 18	vs. Southeast Missouri State		Jaycees Field • Nacogdoches, TX	W 5–3	85	1–2	–
Feb. 19	at Stephen F. Austin		Jaycees Field • Nacogdoches, TX	W 7–4	200	2–2	–
Feb. 21	#1 TCU		Clay Gould Ballpark • Arlington, TX	L 7–2	2,008	2–3	–
Feb. 24	Louisiana Tech		Clay Gould Ballpark • Arlington, TX	L 3–1	442	2–4	–
Feb. 25	Louisiana Tech		Clay Gould Ballpark • Arlington, TX	L 7–3	454	2–5	–
Feb. 26	Louisiana Tech		Clay Gould Ballpark • Arlington, TX	L 6–4	486	2–6	–
Feb. 28	#23 Dallas Baptist		Clay Gould Ballpark • Arlington, TX	L 9–7	497	2–7	–

March (12–7)
Date	Opponent	Rank	Site	Score	Attendance	Overall record	SBC record
Mar. 3	at Texas A&M–Corpus Christi		Chapman Field • Corpus Christi, TX	W 7–3	417	3–7	–
Mar. 5	at Texas A&M–Corpus Christi		Chapman Field • Corpus Christi, TX	W 8–6	477	4–7	–
Mar. 5	at Texas A&M–Corpus Christi		Chapman Field • Corpus Christi, TX	W 4–2	477	5–7	–
Mar. 8	at Abilene Christian		Crutcher Scott Field • Abilene, TX	W 5–4	225	6–7	–
Mar. 10	Milwaukee		Clay Gould Ballpark • Arlington, TX	L 5–2	335	6–8	–
Mar. 11	Milwaukee		Clay Gould Ballpark • Arlington, TX	W 5–4	375	7–8	–
Mar. 12	Milwaukee		Clay Gould Ballpark • Arlington, TX	W 8–5	317	8–8	–
Mar. 14	vs. #4 Texas Tech		Globe Life Park • Arlington, TX	W 5–1	4,259	9–8	–
Mar. 15	Abilene Christian		Clay Gould Ballpark • Arlington, TX	L 9–1	656	9–9	–
Mar. 17	at Georgia State		Georgia State Baseball Complex • Atlanta, GA	W 10–7	268	10–9	1–0
Mar. 18	at Georgia State		Georgia State Baseball Complex • Atlanta, GA	L 2–1	289	10–10	1–1
Mar. 19	at Georgia State		Georgia State Baseball Complex • Atlanta, GA	W 7–1	310	11–10	2–1
Mar. 21	at Sam Houston State		Don Sanders Stadium • Huntsville, TX	L 14–2	1,120	11–11	–
Mar. 24	Georgia Southern		Clay Gould Ballpark • Arlington, TX	W 3–2	310	12–11	3–1
Mar. 25	Georgia Southern		Clay Gould Ballpark • Arlington, TX	L 4–3	474	12–12	3–2
Mar. 26	Georgia Southern		Clay Gould Ballpark • Arlington, TX	L 9–5	339	12–13	3–3
Mar. 28	at Dallas Baptist		Horner Ballpark • Dallas, TX	L 12–7	610	12–14	–
Mar. 31	Troy		Clay Gould Ballpark • Arlington, TX	W 9–6	516	13–14	4–3
Mar. 31	Troy		Clay Gould Ballpark • Arlington, TX	W 5–2	516	14–14	5–3

April (12–3)
Date	Opponent	Rank	Site	Score	Attendance	Overall record	SBC record
April 1	Troy		Clay Gould Ballpark • Arlington, TX	L 13–5	302	14–15	5–4
April 4	#3 TCU		Clay Gould Ballpark • Arlington, TX	L 5–4	1,187	14–16	–
April 7	at Appalachian State		Beaver Stadium • Boone, NC	W 18–1	172	15–16	6–4
April 8	at Appalachian State		Beaver Stadium • Boone, NC	W 5–2	378	16–16	7–4
April 9	at Appalachian State		Beaver Stadium • Boone, NC	W 6–5	398	17–16	8–4
April 13	Little Rock		Clay Gould Ballpark • Arlington, TX	W 2–0	313	18–16	9–4
April 14	Little Rock		Clay Gould Ballpark • Arlington, TX	L 9–4	472	18–17	9-5
April 15	Little Rock		Clay Gould Ballpark • Arlington, TX	W 10–5	464	19–17	10–5
April 18	Texas A&M		Clay Gould Ballpark • Arlington, TX	W 3–2	1,939	20–17	–
April 21	at Louisiana–Monroe		Warhawk Field • Monroe, LA	W 3–2	913	21–17	11–5
April 22	at Louisiana–Monroe		Warhawk Field • Monroe, LA	W 10–2	736	22–17	12-5
April 23	at Louisiana–Monroe		Warhawk Field • Monroe, LA	W 10–3	831	23–17	13-5
April 28	Louisiana–Lafayette		Clay Gould Ballpark • Arlington, TX	W 5–4	547	24–17	14-5
April 30	Louisiana–Lafayette		Clay Gould Ballpark • Arlington, TX	W 10–2	574	25–17	15-5
April 30	Louisiana–Lafayette		Clay Gould Ballpark • Arlington, TX	W 9–3	574	26–17	16-5

May (4–7)
Date	Opponent	Rank	Site	Score	Attendance	Overall record	SBC record
May 2	at Texas	#23	UFCU Disch–Falk Field • Austin, TX	L 4–1	4,414	26–18	-
May 5	at Arkansas State	#23	Tomlinson Stadium–Kell Field • Jonesboro, AR	W 11–7	484	27–18	17–5
May 6	at Arkansas State	#23	Tomlinson Stadium–Kell Field • Jonesboro, AR	W 15–3	361	28–18	18–5
May 7	at Arkansas State	#23	Tomlinson Stadium–Kell Field • Jonesboro, AR	W 2–0	367	29–18	19–5
May 12	Coastal Carolina	#24	Clay Gould Ballpark • Arlington, TX	L 5–4	939	29–19	19–6
May 13	Coastal Carolina	#24	Clay Gould Ballpark • Arlington, TX	L 4–1	505	29–20	19–7
May 14	Coastal Carolina	#24	Clay Gould Ballpark • Arlington, TX	L 5–0	374	29–21	19–8
May 16	at #6 TCU		Lupton Stadium • Fort Worth, TX	L 6–1	4,376	29–22	–
May 18	at Texas State		Bobcat Ballpark • San Marcos, TX	L 7–6	1,430	29–23	19–9
May 19	at Texas State		Bobcat Ballpark • San Marcos, TX	W 12–5	1,343	30–23	20–9
May 20	at Texas State		Bobcat Ballpark • San Marcos, TX	L 7–6	1,313	30–24	20–10

Postseason (0–1)

SBC Tournament (0–1)
Date	Opponent	Rank	Site	Score	Attendance	Overall record	SBCT Record
May 26	vs. Arkansas State		J. I. Clements Stadium • Statesboro, GA	L 4–2	258	30–25	0–1

- Rankings are based on the team's current ranking in the Collegiate Baseball poll.
