= 2017 Louisiana–Lafayette Ragin' Cajuns baseball team =

American college baseball season

2017 Louisiana–Lafayette Ragin' Cajuns baseball
- Conference: Sun Belt Conference
- West Division
- Record: 35-21-1 (19-10-1 SBC)
- Head coach: Tony Robichaux (23rd season)
- Assistant coaches: Anthony Babineaux; Jeremy Talbert
- Home stadium: M. L. Tigue Moore Field at Russo Park

2017 Sun Belt Conference baseball standings
	Conf.						Overall
Team	W		L		T	PCT	W		L		T	PCT
East Division
Coastal Carolina^{x}^{†} ‍‍‍	22	–	7	–	1	.750	37	–	19	–	1	.658
No. 26 South Alabama^{‡}^{y} ‍‍‍	22	–	8	–	0	.733	40	–	21	–	0	.656
Georgia Southern ‍‍‍	18	–	12	–	0	.600	38	–	21	–	0	.644
Troy ‍‍‍	16	–	14	–	0	.533	31	–	25	–	0	.554
Georgia State ‍‍‍	10	–	20	–	0	.333	22	–	33	–	0	.400
Appalachian State ‍‍‍	8	–	22	–	0	.267	19	–	36	–	0	.345
West Division
UT Arlington^{x} ‍‍‍	20	–	10	–	0	.667	30	–	25	–	0	.545
Louisiana–Lafayette ‍‍‍	19	–	10	–	1	.650	35	–	21	–	1	.623
Arkansas State ‍‍‍	13	–	16	–	0	.448	28	–	27	–	0	.509
Texas State ‍‍‍	13	–	17	–	0	.433	29	–	30	–	0	.492
Little Rock ‍‍‍	11	–	18	–	0	.379	21	–	34	–	0	.382
Louisiana–Monroe ‍‍‍	6	–	24	–	0	.200	12	–	43	–	0	.218
x – Division champion † – Conference champion ‡ – Tournament champion y – Invited to the NCAA tournament Rankings from Collegiate Baseball

The 2017 Louisiana–Lafayette Ragin' Cajuns baseball team represented the University of Louisiana at Lafayette in the 2017 NCAA Division I baseball season. The Ragin' Cajuns played their home games at M. L. Tigue Moore Field at Russo Park and were led by twenty-third year head coach Tony Robichaux.

== Preseason ==
=== Sun Belt Conference Coaches Poll ===
The Sun Belt Conference Coaches Poll was released on February 8, 2017. Louisiana-Lafayette was picked to finish first in the West Division with 72 votes and 12 first-place votes; every first place vote available.

Coaches poll (West)
Predicted finish	Team	Votes (1st place)
1	Louisiana-Lafayette	70 (10)
2	UT Arlington	50
3	Little Rock	45
4	Texas State	44
5	Arkansas State	27
6	Louisiana-Monroe	14

=== Preseason All-Sun Belt team ===
The Preseason All-Sun Belt Team was announced on February 2, 2017, and consisted of four Ragin' Cajun players.

- Andrew Beckwith (CCU, SR, Pitcher)
- Evan Challenger (GASO, R-SR, Pitcher)
- Gunner Leger (ULL, JR, Pitcher)
- Dylan Moore (ULL, JR, Pitcher)
- Brady Cox (UTA, SR, Catcher)
- Ryan Cleveland (GASO, SR, 1st Base)
- Jonathan Ortega (TXST, SO, 2nd Base)
- Drew LaBounty (USA, R-JR, Shortstop)
- Seth Lancaster (CCU, JR, 3rd Base)
- Dalton Thomas (LR, SR, Outfield)
- Billy Cooke (CCU, JR, Outfield)
- Travis Swaggerty (USA, SO, Outfield)
- Steven Sensley (ULL, JR, Designated Hitter)
- Joe Robbins (ULL, SR, Utility)

== Roster ==
2017 Louisiana-Lafayette Ragin' Cajuns roster
Pitchers: 2 Colton Schmidt - Junior; 5 Colton Lee - Senior; 6 Nick Lee - Sophomore; 17 Gunner Leger - Junior; 18 Evan Guillory - Junior; 22 Trent Cormier - Senior; 24 Caleb Armstrong - Freshman; 26 Jevin Huval - Senior; 29 Chris Charpentier - Senior; 30 Hogan Harris - Sophomore; 31 Wyatt Marks - Junior; 32 Logan Stoelke - Junior; 38 Oliver Campbell - Freshman; 40 Dylan Moore - Junior; 42 Haden Erbe - Freshman; 43 Jacob Norman - Redshirt Freshman; 45 Jack Burk - Redshirt Freshman; Catchers: 1 Ryne Ray - Redshirt Freshman; 23 Handsome Monica - Junior; 34 Josh Aguilar - Freshman	Infielders: 4 Dylan Poncho - Sophomore; 10 Brad Antchak - Senior; 11 Alex Pinero - Senior; 12 Joe Robbins - Senior; 13 Brenn Conrad - Senior; 14 Kennon Fontenot - Junior; 19 Hunter Kasuls - Sophomore; 27 Steven Sensley - Junior; 41 Monroe Moll - Freshman; Outfielders: 8 Zach Lafleur - Junior; 9 Todd Lott - Freshman; 28 Tyler Stover - Junior; 33 Jamarius Williams - Junior; 35 Ishmael Edwards - Senior; 46 Tremaine Spears - Freshman

=== Coaching staff ===
2016 Louisiana-Lafayette Ragin' Cajuns coaching staff
- Tony Robichaux – Head Coach – 22nd year
- Anthony Babineaux – Associate head coach – 22nd year
- Jeremy Talbot – Assistant Head Coach – 3rd year
- Daniel Freeman – Volunteer Assistant Coach – 2nd year
- Chris Domingue – Director of Baseball Operations – 14th year
- Greg Davis – Student Assistant
- Tyler Girouard – Manager
- Debbie Guilbeaux – Administrative Assistant
- Jacob Raggio – Clubhouse Manager
- Colin Burgess – Clubhouse Manager
- Kaleb Istre – Field Manager
- Jared Stelly – Field Manager
- Victoria Stringer – Student Assistant

== Schedule and results ==
Louisiana–Lafayette announced its 2017 baseball schedule on October 31, 2016. The 2017 schedule consists of 27 home and 29 away games in the regular season. The Ragin' Cajuns will host Sun Belts foes Appalachian State, Arkansas State, Georgia Southern, South Alabama, and Texas State and will travel to Coastal Carolina, Little Rock, Louisiana–Monroe, Texas–Arlington, and Troy.

The 2017 Sun Belt Conference Championship will be contested May 24–28 in Statesboro, Georgia, and will be hosted by Georgia Southern.

Legend
	Louisiana-Lafayette win
	Louisiana-Lafayette loss
	Postponement
**Bold**	Louisiana-Lafayette team member

2017 Louisiana–Lafayette Ragin' Cajuns baseball game log
Regular season (35-20-1)

February (4-3)
Date	Opponent	Rank	Site/stadium	Score	Win	Loss	Save	TV	Attendance	Overall record	SBC record
Tangi Tourism Baseball Classic
Feb. 17	at Southeastern Louisiana	No. 14	Alumni Field • Hammond, LA	Canceled and rescheduled on Feb. 20 due to inclement weather							
Feb. 18	vs. Murray State	No. 14	Alumni Field • Hammond, LA	**L** 0–2	Dills (1-0)	**Leger** (0-1)	Gendron (1)	None	580	0–1	
Feb. 19	vs. Hofstra	No. 14	Alumni Field • Hammond, LA	**W** 1–0	**Lee** (1-0)	Cillis (0-1)	**Moore** (1)	None	388	1–1	
Feb. 20	at Southeastern Louisiana	No. 14	Alumni Field • Hammond, LA	Suspended during the game and rescheduled on March 29 due to inclement weather, SELA leads 5-4 in 14 innings							
Feb. 21	at Nicholls	No. 13	Ray E. Didier Field • Thibodaux, LA	**L** 1–3	Hanchar (1-0)	**Burk** (0-1)	Tarver (1)	None	1,053	1–2	
Feb. 24	at No. 18 Sam Houston State	No. 13	Don Sanders Stadium • Huntsville, TX	**W** 2-0	**Leger** (1-1)	Donica (1-1)	**Moore** (2)	ESPN3	1,128	2–2	
Feb. 25	at No. 18 Sam Houston State	No. 13	Don Sanders Stadium • Huntsville, TX	**W** 6-1	**Lee** (2-0)	Ballew (0-1)	None	None	1,233	3–2	
Feb. 26	at No. 18 Sam Houston State	No. 13	Don Sanders Stadium • Huntsville, TX	**L** 3-8	Wesneski (2-0)	**Guillory** (0-1)	Backhus (1)	None	1,052	3–3	
Feb. 28	at Northwestern State	No. 16	Brown–Stroud Field • Natchitoches, LA	**W** 8-6 (12 inn)	**Armstrong** (1-0)	Landgon (0-1)	**Charpentier** (1)	None	541	4–3	

March (11-7)
Date	Opponent	Rank	Site/stadium	Score	Win	Loss	Save	TV	Attendance	Overall record	SBC record
Mar. 3	Southern Miss	No. 16	M. L. Tigue Moore Field at Russo Park • Lafayette, LA	**W** 3-1	**Leger** (2-1)	Roberts (0-1)	**Moore** (3)	None	5,250	5–3	
Mar. 4	Southern Miss	No. 16	M. L. Tigue Moore Field at Russo Park • Lafayette, LA	**W** 5-4	**Lee** (3-0)	McCarty (2-1)	**Moore** (4)	None	5,020	6–3	
Mar. 5	Southern Miss	No. 16	M. L. Tigue Moore Field at Russo Park • Lafayette, LA	**L** 11-15 (11 inn)	Wallner (2-0)	**Burk** (0-2)	None	None	4,716	6–4	
Mar. 7	at Tulane	No. 16	Greer Field • New Orleans, LA	Postponed to April 18 due to possibility of inclement weather in New Orleans							
Mar. 10	Saint Peter's	No. 15	M. L. Tigue Moore Field at Russo Park • Lafayette, LA	**W** 10-0	**Leger** (3-1)	Krajnik (0-1)	None	None	4,535	7–4	
Mar. 11	Saint Peter's	No. 15	M. L. Tigue Moore Field at Russo Park • Lafayette, LA	**W** 6-1	**Lee** (4-1)	Assante (0-1)	**Marks** (1)	None	4,864	8–4	
Mar. 12	Saint Peter's	No. 15	M. L. Tigue Moore Field at Russo Park • Lafayette, LA	**W** 4-0	**Harris** (1-0)	Soriano (0-1)	None	None	4,569	9–4	
Mar. 15	at No. 23 Louisiana Tech	No. 14	J. C. Love Field • Ruston, LA	**L** 5-6 (13 inn)	Hamilton (2-1)	**Guillory** (0-2)	None	None	3,311	9–5	
Mar. 17	Appalachian State	No. 14	M. L. Tigue Moore Field at Russo Park • Lafayette, LA	**W** 3-0	**Leger** (4-1)	Holden (1-3)	**Marks** (2)	None	4,963	10–5	1–0
Mar. 18	Appalachian State	No. 14	M. L. Tigue Moore Field at Russo Park • Lafayette, LA	**L** 4-12	Schmid (3-2)	**Lee** (4-1)	Howell (3)	None	5,005	10–6	1–1
Mar. 19	Appalachian State	No. 14	M. L. Tigue Moore Field at Russo Park • Lafayette, LA	**W** 4-3	**Guillory** (1-2)	Howell (1-1)	None	None	4,888	11–6	2–1
Mar. 21	Houston	No. 15	M. L. Tigue Moore Field at Russo Park • Lafayette, LA	**L** 0-4	Cumbie (3-0)	**Burk** (0-3)	None	None	5,247	11–7	
Mar. 22	Tulane	No. 15	M. L. Tigue Moore Field at Russo Park • Lafayette, LA	**L** 4-6	Bjorngjeld (1-2)	**Huval** (0-1)	Issa (1)	None	4,910	11–8	
Mar. 24	at Troy	No. 15	Riddle–Pace Field • Troy, AL	**W** 6-5	**Marks** (1-0)	Skinner (1-2)	**Moore** (5)	None	1,745	12–8	3–1
Mar. 25	at Troy	No. 15	Riddle–Pace Field • Troy, AL	**L** 5-7	Crook (4-0)	**Lee** (4-2)	Skinner (6)	None	1,771	12–9	3–2
Mar. 26	at Troy	No. 15	Riddle–Pace Field • Troy, AL	**W** 7-2	**Harris** (2-0)	Hebert (1-1)	None	None	878	13–9	4–2
Mar. 28	at McNeese State	No. 21	Cowboy Diamond • Lake Charles, LA	**W** 3-1	**Burk** (1-3)	Anderson (2-2)	**Moore** (6)	None	1,731	14–9	
Tangi Tourism Baseball Classic
Mar. 29	at Southeastern Louisiana	No. 21	Alumni Field • Hammond, LA	**L** 4-5 (14 inn)	Green (1-0)	**Marks** (1-1)	None	CST	1,619	14–10	
Mar. 29	at Southeastern Louisiana Lions	No. 21	Alumni Field • Hammond, LA	**L** 3-15	Robinson (1-0)	**Erbe** (0-1)	None	CST	1,619	14–11	
Mar. 31	South Alabama	No. 21	M. L. Tigue Moore Field at Russo Park • Lafayette, LA	**W** 11-1	**Leger** (5-1)	Bell (1-3)	**Marks** (3)	None	4,736	15–11	5–2

April (12-6-1)
Date	Opponent	Rank	Site/stadium	Score	Win	Loss	Save	TV	Attendance	Overall record	SBC record
April 1	South Alabama	No. 21	M. L. Tigue Moore Field at Russo Park • Lafayette, LA	**L** 0-6	Huston (3-1)	**Lee** (4-3)	None	None	4,630	15–12	5–3
April 2	South Alabama	No. 21	M. L. Tigue Moore Field at Russo Park • Lafayette, LA	**W** 10-2	**Harris** (3-0)	Carr (2-1)	None	None	4,752	16–12	6–3
April 4	Nicholls	No. 20	M. L. Tigue Moore Field • Lafayette, LA	**W** 18-2	**Burk** (2-3)	Ernestine (1-1)	None	None	4,952	17–12	
April 7	at No. 26 Coastal Carolina	No. 20	Springs Brooks Stadium • Conway, SC	**W** 1-0	**Leger** (6-1)	Cunningham (4-1)	**Moore** (7)	None	None	18–12	7–3
April 8	at No. 26 Coastal Carolina	No. 20	Springs Brooks Stadium • Conway, SC	**L** 8-9	Beckwith (4-1)	**Moore** (0-1)	None	None	2,278	18–13	7–4
April 9	at No. 26 Coastal Carolina	No. 20	Springs Brooks Stadium • Conway, SC	**T** 7-7				None	2,107	18–13-1	7–4-1
Wally Pontiff Classic
April 11	vs. No. 8 LSU		Shrine on Airline • Metairie, LA	**L** 2-3	Peterson (2-1)	**Burk** (2-4)	Newman (4)	None	9,963	18–14-1	
April 13	Arkansas State		M. L. Tigue Moore Field at Russo Park • Lafayette, LA	**W** 8-0	**Leger** (8-1)	Welsh (1-1)	**Marks** (4)	None	5,285	19–14-1	8-4-1
April 14	Arkansas State		M. L. Tigue Moore Field at Russo Park • Lafayette, LA	**W** 13-2	**Guillory** (2-2)	Culbertson (3-4)	None	None	4,909	20–14-1	9–4-1
April 15	Arkansas State		M. L. Tigue Moore Field at Russo Park • Lafayette, LA	**W** 3-2	**Marks** (2-1)	Zuber (3-1)	None	None	4,959	21–14-1	10–4-1
April 18	Tulane		Greer Field at Turchin Stadium • New Orleans, LA	**W** 1-0	**Schmidt** (1-0)	Massey (0-5)	**Moore** (8)	None	2,198	22–14-1	
April 19	Southeastern Louisiana		M. L. Tigue Moore Field at Russo Park • Lafayette, LA	**W** 9-2	**Norman** (1-0)	Mount (1-1)	None	None	4,675	23–14-1	
April 21	at Little Rock		Gary Hogan Field • Little Rock, AR	**W** 9-4	**Leger** (8-1)	LeMoine (1-4)	None	None		24–14-1	
April 22	at Little Rock		Gary Hogan Field • Little Rock, AR	**W** 7-4	**Lee** (5-3)	Malcom (2-4)	**Marks** (5)	None	403	25–14-1	
April 23	at Little Rock		Gary Hogan Field • Little Rock, AR	**W** 5-3	**Moore** (1-1)	Slayton (3-2)	None	None	243	26–14-1	
April 25	vs. Texas	No. 20	Constellation Field • Sugar Land, TX	**W** 8-1	**Guillory** (3-2)	Henley (3-4)	None	Longhorn Network		27–14-1	
April 26	McNeese State	No. 20	M. L. Tigue Moore Field at Russo Park • Lafayette, LA	Postponed to May 10 due to impending weather in Lafayette							
April 28	at UT Arlington	No. 20	Clay Gould Ballpark • Arlington, TX	**L** 4-5	Simmons (7-2)	**Lee** (5-4)	James (11)	None	547	27–15-1	13-5-1
April 29	at UT Arlington	No. 20	Clay Gould Ballpark • Arlington, TX	**L** 2-10	Patterson (5-3)	**Leger** (8-2)	None	None		27–16-1	13-6-1
April 30	at UT Arlington	No. 20	Gary Hogan Field • Arlington, TX	**L** 3-9	Hernandez (5-0)	**Harris** (4-1)	None	None	574	27–17-1	13-7-1

May (8-3)
Date	Opponent	Rank	Site/stadium	Score	Win	Loss	Save	TV	Attendance	Overall record	SBC record
May 5	Georgia Southern		M. L. Tigue Moore Field at Russo Park • Lafayette, LA	**W** 3-0	**Leger** (9-2)	Challenger (2-5)	**Marks** (6)	None	5,095	28–17-1	14-7-1
May 6	Georgia Southern		M. L. Tigue Moore Field at Russo Park • Lafayette, LA	**L** 5-6	Cohen (4-3)	**Schmidt** (1-1)	Hughes (7)	None	4,964	28–18-1	14–8-1
May 7	Georgia Southern		M. L. Tigue Moore Field at Russo Park • Lafayette, LA	**L** 1-9	Shuman (5-0)	**Harris** (3-2)	None	None	4,998	28–19-1	14–9-1
May 9	Louisiana Tech		M. L. Tigue Moore Field at Russo Park • Lafayette, LA	**W** 3-1	**Guillory** (4-2)	Linck (3-2)	**Moore** (9)	None	5,138	29–19-1	
May 10	McNeese State		M. L. Tigue Moore Field at Russo Park • Lafayette, LA	**W** 4-1	**Lee** (6-4)	Rider (1-1)	**Moore** (10)	None	5,174	30–19-1	
May 12	Texas State		M. L. Tigue Moore Field at Russo Park • Lafayette, LA	**W** 8-7	**Moore** (2-1)	Reich (2-5)	None	None	5,028	31–19-1	15–9-1
May 13	Texas State		M. L. Tigue Moore Field at Russo Park • Lafayette, LA	**L** 4-8	Theriot (4-1)	**Huval** (0-2)	None	None	4,751	31–20-1	15–10-1
May 14	Texas State		M. L. Tigue Moore Field at Russo Park • Lafayette, LA	**W** 4-3	**Harris** (4-2)	Baird (1-6)	**Marks** (7)	None	4,750	32–20-1	16–10-1
May 18	at Louisiana–Monroe		Warhawk Field • Monroe, LA	**W** 16-2	**Leger** (10-2)	Auger (0-4)	None	None	834	33–20-1	
May 19	at Louisiana–Monroe		Warhawk Field • Monroe, LA	**W** 5-3	**Schmidt** (2-1)	Leone (2-6)	**Moore** (11)	None	1,068	34–20-1	
May 20	at Louisiana–Monroe		Warhawk Field • Monroe, LA	**W** 6-3	**Harris** (5-2)	Beal (3-8)	**Huval** (1)	None		35–20-1	

Postseason (0-1)

SBC Tournament
Date	Opponent	Rank	Site/stadium	Score	Win	Loss	Save	TV	Attendance	Overall record	SBC record
May 26	Georgia Southern		J. I. Clements Stadium • Statesboro, GA	**L** 6-7	Shuman (8-0)	**Guillory** (4-3)	None	ESPN3	1,608	35–21-1	

- Rankings are based on the team's current ranking in the Collegiate Baseball poll.
