= 2017 Texas State Bobcats baseball team =

American college baseball season

2017 Texas State Bobcats baseball
- Conference: Sun Belt Conference
- West Division
- Record: 29–30 (13–17 SBC)
- Head coach: Ty Harrington (17th season)
- Home stadium: Bobcat Ballpark

2017 Sun Belt Conference baseball standings
	Conf.						Overall
Team	W		L		T	PCT	W		L		T	PCT
East Division
Coastal Carolina^{x}^{†} ‍‍‍	22	–	7	–	1	.750	37	–	19	–	1	.658
No. 26 South Alabama^{‡}^{y} ‍‍‍	22	–	8	–	0	.733	40	–	21	–	0	.656
Georgia Southern ‍‍‍	18	–	12	–	0	.600	38	–	21	–	0	.644
Troy ‍‍‍	16	–	14	–	0	.533	31	–	25	–	0	.554
Georgia State ‍‍‍	10	–	20	–	0	.333	22	–	33	–	0	.400
Appalachian State ‍‍‍	8	–	22	–	0	.267	19	–	36	–	0	.345
West Division
UT Arlington^{x} ‍‍‍	20	–	10	–	0	.667	30	–	25	–	0	.545
Louisiana–Lafayette ‍‍‍	19	–	10	–	1	.650	35	–	21	–	1	.623
Arkansas State ‍‍‍	13	–	16	–	0	.448	28	–	27	–	0	.509
Texas State ‍‍‍	13	–	17	–	0	.433	29	–	30	–	0	.492
Little Rock ‍‍‍	11	–	18	–	0	.379	21	–	34	–	0	.382
Louisiana–Monroe ‍‍‍	6	–	24	–	0	.200	12	–	43	–	0	.218
x – Division champion † – Conference champion ‡ – Tournament champion y – Invited to the NCAA tournament Rankings from Collegiate Baseball

The 2017 Texas State Bobcats baseball team represented the Texas State University in the 2017 NCAA Division I baseball season. The Bobcats played their home games at Bobcat Ballpark.

== Schedule and results ==
Texas State announced its 2017 baseball schedule on October 26, 2016. The 2017 schedule consisted of 33 home and 23 away games in the regular season. The Bobcats hosted Sun Belts foes Arkansas State, Coastal Carolina, Georgia State, Louisiana–Monroe, and Texas–Arlington and will travel to Appalachian State, Little Rock, Louisiana, South Alabama, and Troy.

The 2017 Sun Belt Conference Championship was contested May 24–28 in Statesboro, Georgia, and was hosted by Georgia Southern.

Texas State finished 4th in the west division of the conference which qualified the Bobcats to compete in the tournament as the 8th seed to seek for the team's 1st Sun Belt Conference tournament title.

2017 Texas State Bobcats baseball game log
Regular season (27–29)

February (3–6)
Date	Opponent	Rank	Site	Score	Attendance	Overall record	SBC record
Feb. 17	Purdue		Bobcat Ballpark • San Marcos, TX	L 9–3	2,068	0–1	–
Feb. 18	Purdue		Bobcat Ballpark • San Marcos, TX	L 12–8	1,702	0–2	–
Feb. 18	Purdue		Bobcat Ballpark • San Marcos, TX	W 13–11	1,702	1–2	–
Feb. 19	Purdue		Bobcat Ballpark • San Marcos, TX	W 14–5	1,253	2–2	–
Feb. 22	Baylor		Bobcat Ballpark • San Marcos, TX	L 4–0	2,002	2–3	–
Feb. 24	at Oklahoma State		Allie P. Reynolds Stadium • Stillwater, OK	L 10–7	1,402	2–4	–
Feb. 25	at Oklahoma State		Allie P. Reynolds Stadium • Stillwater, OK	W 12–11	1,504	3–4	–
Feb. 26	at Oklahoma State		Allie P. Reynolds Stadium • Stillwater, OK	L 6–3	734	3–5	–
Feb. 28	Sam Houston State		Bobcat Ballpark • San Marcos, TX	L 7–4	1,435	3–6	–

March (14–4)
Date	Opponent	Rank	Site	Score	Attendance	Overall record	SBC record
Mar. 3	Richmond		Bobcat Ballpark • San Marcos, TX	W 18–3	1,382	4–6	–
Mar. 5	Richmond		Bobcat Ballpark • San Marcos, TX	W 6–5	1,321	5–6	–
Mar. 5	Richmond		Bobcat Ballpark • San Marcos, TX	W 13–2	1,321	6–6	–
Mar. 7	UTSA		Bobcat Ballpark • San Marcos, TX	L 9–1	1,345	6–7	–
Mar. 10	Alabama A&M		Bobcat Ballpark • San Marcos, TX	W 7–2	1,153	7–7	–
Mar. 12	Alabama A&M		Bobcat Ballpark • San Marcos, TX	W 8–3	1,112	8–7	–
Mar. 12	Alabama A&M		Bobcat Ballpark • San Marcos, TX	W 10–0	1,112	9–7	–
Mar. 15	Rice		Bobcat Ballpark • San Marcos, TX	W 13–4	1,772	10–7	–
Mar. 17	Coastal Carolina		Bobcat Ballpark • San Marcos, TX	W 5–4	1,478	11–7	1–0
Mar. 18	Coastal Carolina		Bobcat Ballpark • San Marcos, TX	L 4–3	1,621	11–8	1–1
Mar. 19	Coastal Carolina		Bobcat Ballpark • San Marcos, TX	W 10–7	1,360	12–8	2–1
Mar. 21	Texas		Bobcat Ballpark • San Marcos, TX	W 11–10	3,017	13–8	–
Mar. 24	at Appalachian State		Beaver Stadium • Boone, NC	W 6–3	532	14–8	3–1
Mar. 25	at Appalachian State		Beaver Stadium • Boone, NC	W 7–4	558	15–8	4–1
Mar. 25	at Appalachian State		Beaver Stadium • Boone, NC	W 2–0	558	16–8	5–1
Mar. 28	Texas A&M		Bobcat Ballpark • San Marcos, TX	L 9–3	2,952	16–9	–
Mar. 31	Arkansas State		Bobcat Ballpark • San Marcos, TX	L 13–7	1,430	16–10	5–2
Mar. 31	Arkansas State		Bobcat Ballpark • San Marcos, TX	W 16–7	1,430	17–10	6–2

April (5–13)
Date	Opponent	Rank	Site	Score	Attendance	Overall record	SBC record
April 1	Arkansas State		Bobcat Ballpark • San Marcos, TX	L 8–7	1,206	17–11	6–3
April 4	Prairie View A&M		Bobcat Ballpark • San Marcos, TX	W 10–1	1,159	18–11	–
April 5	Texas–Rio Grande		Bobcat Ballpark • San Marcos, TX	W 11–9	1,277	19–11	–
April 7	at Little Rock		Gary Hogan Field • Little Rock, AR	W 7–3	252	20–11	7–3
April 8	at Little Rock		Gary Hogan Field • Little Rock, AR	L 8–7	301	20–12	7–4
April 9	at Little Rock		Gary Hogan Field • Little Rock, AR	L 8–7	239	20–13	7–5
April 11	at Texas		UFCU Disch–Falk Field • Austin, TX	L 8–7	4,474	20–14	-
April 13	Louisiana–Monroe		Bobcat Ballpark • San Marcos, TX	L 8–7	1,275	20–15	7–6
April 14	Louisiana–Monroe		Bobcat Ballpark • San Marcos, TX	W 9–5	1,254	21–15	8–6
April 15	Louisiana–Monroe		Bobcat Ballpark • San Marcos, TX	W 7–4	1,536	22–15	9–6
April 18	at Texas		UFCU Disch–Falk Field • Austin, TX	L 2–0	4,744	22–16	-
April 21	at Troy		Riddle–Pace Field • Troy, AL	L 4–0	712	22–17	9-7
April 22	at Troy		Riddle–Pace Field • Troy, AL	L 4–3	792	22–18	9-8
April 22	at Troy		Riddle–Pace Field • Troy, AL	L 6–3	992	22–19	9-9
April 25	at Baylor		Baylor Ballpark • Waco, TX	L 10–2	2,068	22–20	-
April 28	at South Alabama		Eddie Stanky Field • Mobile, AL	L 8–3	1,347	22–21	9-10
April 29	at South Alabama		Eddie Stanky Field • Mobile, AL	L 9–4	1,387	22–22	9-11
April 30	at South Alabama		Eddie Stanky Field • Mobile, AL	L 7–5	1,215	22–23	9-12

May (5–6)
Date	Opponent	Rank	Site	Score	Attendance	Overall record	SBC record
May 2	UTSA		Wolff Stadium • San Antonio, TX	W 11–8	300	23–23	-
May 5	Georgia State		Bobcat Ballpark • San Marcos, TX	L 11–7	1,151	23–24	9–13
May 6	Georgia State		Bobcat Ballpark • San Marcos, TX	W 10–9	1,203	24–24	10–13
May 7	Georgia State		Bobcat Ballpark • San Marcos, TX	L 11–8	1,143	24–25	10–14
May 12	at Louisiana–Lafayette		M. L. Tigue Moore Field • Lafayette, LA	L 8–7	5,028	24–26	10–15
May 13	at Louisiana–Lafayette		M. L. Tigue Moore Field • Lafayette, LA	W 10–9	4,751	25–26	11–15
May 14	at Louisiana–Lafayette		M. L. Tigue Moore Field • Lafayette, LA	L 4–3	4,750	25–27	11–16
May 16	at Rice		Reckling Park • Houston, TX	L 10–1	2,568	25–28	–
May 18	Texas–Arlington		Bobcat Ballpark • San Marcos, TX	W 7–6	1,430	26–28	12–16
May 19	Texas–Arlington		Bobcat Ballpark • San Marcos, TX	L 12–5	1,343	26–29	12–17
May 20	Texas–Arlington		Bobcat Ballpark • San Marcos, TX	W 7–6	1,313	27–29	13–17

Post-season (2–1)

SBC Tournament (2–1)
Date	Opponent	Rank	Site	Score	Attendance	Overall record	SBCT Record
May 25	vs. Little Rock		J. I. Clements Stadium • Statesboro, GA	W 3–2	335	28–29	1–0
May 26	vs. #18 Coastal Carolina		J. I. Clements Stadium • Statesboro, GA	W 7–5	578	29–29	2–0
May 27	vs. Georgia Southern		J. I. Clements Stadium • Statesboro, GA	L 11–5	1,148	29–30	2–1

- Rankings are based on the team's current ranking in the Collegiate Baseball poll.
