= 2017 Louisiana–Monroe Warhawks baseball team =

American college baseball season

2017 Louisiana–Monroe Warhawks baseball
- Conference: Sun Belt Conference
- West Division
- Record: 12–43 (6–24 SBC)
- Head coach: Bruce Peddie (4th season)
- Home stadium: Warhawk Field

2017 Sun Belt Conference baseball standings
	Conf.						Overall
Team	W		L		T	PCT	W		L		T	PCT
East Division
Coastal Carolina^{x}^{†} ‍‍‍	22	–	7	–	1	.750	37	–	19	–	1	.658
No. 26 South Alabama^{‡}^{y} ‍‍‍	22	–	8	–	0	.733	40	–	21	–	0	.656
Georgia Southern ‍‍‍	18	–	12	–	0	.600	38	–	21	–	0	.644
Troy ‍‍‍	16	–	14	–	0	.533	31	–	25	–	0	.554
Georgia State ‍‍‍	10	–	20	–	0	.333	22	–	33	–	0	.400
Appalachian State ‍‍‍	8	–	22	–	0	.267	19	–	36	–	0	.345
West Division
UT Arlington^{x} ‍‍‍	20	–	10	–	0	.667	30	–	25	–	0	.545
Louisiana–Lafayette ‍‍‍	19	–	10	–	1	.650	35	–	21	–	1	.623
Arkansas State ‍‍‍	13	–	16	–	0	.448	28	–	27	–	0	.509
Texas State ‍‍‍	13	–	17	–	0	.433	29	–	30	–	0	.492
Little Rock ‍‍‍	11	–	18	–	0	.379	21	–	34	–	0	.382
Louisiana–Monroe ‍‍‍	6	–	24	–	0	.200	12	–	43	–	0	.218
x – Division champion † – Conference champion ‡ – Tournament champion y – Invited to the NCAA tournament Rankings from Collegiate Baseball

The 2017 Louisiana–Monroe Warhawks baseball team represented the University of Louisiana at Monroe in the 2017 NCAA Division I baseball season. The Warhawks played their home games at Warhawk Field.

== Schedule and results ==
Louisiana–Monroe announced its 2017 football schedule on December 16, 2016. The 2017 schedule consists of 23 home and 33 away games in the regular season. The Warhawks will host Sun Belts foes Coastal Carolina, Little Rock, Louisiana, South Alabama, and Texas–Arlington and will travel to Arkansas State, Georgia Southern, Georgia State, Texas State, and Troy.

The 2017 Sun Belt Conference Championship will be contested May 24–28 in Statesboro, Georgia, and will be hosted by Georgia Southern.

2017 Louisiana–Monroe Warhawks baseball game log
Regular season (1–3)

February (1–3)
Date	Opponent	Rank	Site	Score	Attendance	Overall record	SBC record
Feb. 17	at #26 Dallas Baptist		Horner Ballpark • Dallas, TX	W 8–3	1,024	1–0	–
Feb. 18	at #26 Dallas Baptist		Horner Park • Dallas, TX	L 11–0	725	1–1	–
Feb. 19	at #26 Dallas Baptist		Horner Park • Dallas, TX	L 12–4	580	1–2	–
Feb. 21	McNeese State		Warhawk Field • Monroe, LA	L 32–4	324	1–3	–
Feb. 24	Southern Illinois		Warhawk Field • Monroe, LA			–	–
Feb. 25	Southern Illinois		Warhawk Field • Monroe, LA			–	–
Feb. 26	Southern Illinois		Warhawk Field • Monroe, LA			–	–
Feb. 28	at Jackson State		Braddy Field • Jackson, MS			–	–

March (0–0)
Date	Opponent	Rank	Site	Score	Attendance	Overall record	SBC record
Mar. 1	at McNeese State		Cowboy Diamond • Lake Charles, LA			–	–
Mar. 3	at Alabama		Sewell–Thomas Stadium • Tuscaloosa, AL			–	–
Mar. 4	at Alabama		Sewell–Thomas Stadium • Tuscaloosa, AL			–	–
Mar. 5	at Alabama		Sewell–Thomas Stadium • Tuscaloosa, AL			–	–
Mar. 7	at Arkansas		Baum Stadium • Fayetteville, AR			–	–
Mar. 8	at Arkansas		Baum Stadium • Fayetteville, AR			–	–
Mar. 10	at UAB		Jerry D. Young Memorial Field • Birmingham, AL			–	–
Mar. 11	at UAB		Jerry D. Young Memorial Field • Birmingham, AL			–	–
Mar. 12	at UAB		Jerry D. Young Memorial Field • Birmingham, AL			–	–
Mar. 15	Jackson State		Warhawk Field • Monroe, LA			–	–
Mar. 17	at Arkansas State		Tomlinson Stadium–Kell Field • Jonesboro, AR			–	–
Mar. 18	at Arkansas State		Tomlinson Stadium–Kell Field • Jonesboro, AR			–	–
Mar. 19	at Arkansas State		Tomlinson Stadium–Kell Field • Jonesboro, AR			–	–
Mar. 21	Grambling State		Warhawk Field • Monroe, LA			–	–
Mar. 24	Little Rock		Warhawk Field • Monroe, LA			–	–
Mar. 25	Little Rock		Warhawk Field • Monroe, LA			–	–
Mar. 26	Little Rock		Warhawk Field • Monroe, LA			–	–
Mar. 28	at Louisiana Tech		J. C. Love Field • Ruston, LA			–	–
Mar. 31	at Georgia Southern		J. I. Clements Stadium • Statesboro, GA			–	–

April (0–0)
Date	Opponent	Rank	Site	Score	Attendance	Overall record	SBC record
April 1	at Georgia Southern		J. I. Clements Stadium • Statesboro, GA			–	–
April 2	at Georgia Southern		J. I. Clements Stadium • Statesboro, GA			–	–
April 4	Northwestern State		Warhawk Field • Monroe, LA			–	–
April 5	at Northwestern State		Brown–Stroud Field • Natchitoches, LA			–	–
April 7	South Alabama		Warhawk Field • Monroe, LA			–	–
April 8	South Alabama		Warhawk Field • Monroe, LA			–	–
April 9	South Alabama		Warhawk Field • Monroe, LA			–	–
April 11	Louisiana Tech		Warhawk Field • Monroe, LA			–	-
April 13	at Texas State		Bobcat Ballpark • San Marcos, TX			–	–
April 14	at Texas State		Bobcat Ballpark • San Marcos, TX			–	–
April 15	at Texas State		Bobcat Ballpark • San Marcos, TX			–	–
April 18	at Grambling State		Wilbert Ellis Field • Grambling, LA			–	-
April 21	Texas–Arlington		Warhawk Field • Monroe, LA			–	-
April 22	Texas–Arlington		Warhawk Field • Monroe, LA			–	-
April 23	Texas–Arlington		Warhawk Field • Monroe, LA			–	-
April 28	at Georgia State		Georgia State Baseball Complex • Atlanta, GA			–	-
April 29	at Georgia State		Georgia State Baseball Complex • Atlanta, GA			–	-
April 30	at Georgia State		Georgia State Baseball Complex • Atlanta, GA			–	-

May (0–0)
Date	Opponent	Rank	Site	Score	Attendance	Overall record	SBC record
May 2	at Ole Miss		Swayze Field • Oxford, MS			–	-
May 3	at Ole Miss		Swayze Field • Oxford, MS			–	–
May 5	Coastal Carolina		Warhawk Field • Monroe, LA			–	–
May 6	Coastal Carolina		Warhawk Field • Monroe, LA			–	–
May 7	Coastal Carolina		Warhawk Field • Monroe, LA			–	–
May 12	at Troy		Riddle–Pace Field • Troy, AL			–	–
May 13	at Troy		Riddle–Pace Field • Troy, AL			–	–
May 14	at Troy		Riddle–Pace Field • Troy, AL			–	–
May 18	Louisiana–Lafayette		Warhawk Field • Monroe, LA			–	–
May 19	Louisiana–Lafayette		Warhawk Field • Monroe, LA			–	–
May 20	Louisiana–Lafayette		Warhawk Field • Monroe, LA			–	–

Post-season

SBC Tournament
Date	Opponent	Rank	Site	Score	Attendance	Overall record	SBCT Record
May 24	TBD		J. I. Clements Stadium • Statesboro, GA			–	–

- Rankings are based on the team's current ranking in the Collegiate Baseball poll.
