= 2017 Arkansas State Red Wolves baseball team =

College level baseball team

2017 Arkansas State Red Wolves baseball
- Conference: Sun Belt Conference
- West Division
- Record: 28–27 (13–16 SBC)
- Head coach: Tommy Raffo (9th season)
- Home stadium: Tomlinson Stadium–Kell Field

2017 Sun Belt Conference baseball standings
| | Conf. | | | | | | Overall |
| Team | W | | L | | T | PCT | W | | L | | T | PCT |
|---|---|---|---|---|---|---|---|---|---|---|---|---|
East Division
| Coastal Carolina^{x}^{†} ‍‍‍ | 22 | – | 7 | – | 1 | .750 | 37 | – | 19 | – | 1 | .658 |
| No. 26 South Alabama^{‡}^{y} ‍‍‍ | 22 | – | 8 | – | 0 | .733 | 40 | – | 21 | – | 0 | .656 |
| Georgia Southern ‍‍‍ | 18 | – | 12 | – | 0 | .600 | 38 | – | 21 | – | 0 | .644 |
| Troy ‍‍‍ | 16 | – | 14 | – | 0 | .533 | 31 | – | 25 | – | 0 | .554 |
| Georgia State ‍‍‍ | 10 | – | 20 | – | 0 | .333 | 22 | – | 33 | – | 0 | .400 |
| Appalachian State ‍‍‍ | 8 | – | 22 | – | 0 | .267 | 19 | – | 36 | – | 0 | .345 |
West Division
| UT Arlington^{x} ‍‍‍ | 20 | – | 10 | – | 0 | .667 | 30 | – | 25 | – | 0 | .545 |
| Louisiana–Lafayette ‍‍‍ | 19 | – | 10 | – | 1 | .650 | 35 | – | 21 | – | 1 | .623 |
| Arkansas State ‍‍‍ | 13 | – | 16 | – | 0 | .448 | 28 | – | 27 | – | 0 | .509 |
| Texas State ‍‍‍ | 13 | – | 17 | – | 0 | .433 | 29 | – | 30 | – | 0 | .492 |
| Little Rock ‍‍‍ | 11 | – | 18 | – | 0 | .379 | 21 | – | 34 | – | 0 | .382 |
| Louisiana–Monroe ‍‍‍ | 6 | – | 24 | – | 0 | .200 | 12 | – | 43 | – | 0 | .218 |
x – Division champion † – Conference champion ‡ – Tournament champion y – Invited to the NCAA tournament Rankings from Collegiate Baseball

The 2017 Arkansas State Red Wolves baseball team represented the Arkansas State University during the 2017 NCAA Division I baseball season. The Red Wolves played their home games at Tomlinson Stadium–Kell Field.

== Schedule and results ==
Arkansas State announced its 2017 baseball schedule on November 8, 2016. The 2017 schedule consists of 32 home and 24 away games in the regular season. The Red Wolves will host Sun Belts foes Georgia State, Little Rock, Louisiana–Monroe, South Alabama, and Texas–Arlington and will travel to Appalachian State, Coastal Carolina, Georgia Southern, Louisiana–Lafayette, and Texas State.

The 2017 Sun Belt Conference Championship will be contested May 24–28 in Statesboro, Georgia, and will be hosted by Georgia Southern.

2017 Arkansas State Red Wolves baseball game log
Regular season (3–0)

February (3–0)
| Date | Opponent | Rank | Site | Score | Attendance | Overall record | SBC record |
|---|---|---|---|---|---|---|---|
| Feb. 17 | New York Tech | | Tomlinson Stadium–Kell Field • Jonesboro, AR | W 6–0 | 550 | 1–0 | – |
| Feb. 18 | New York Tech | | Tomlinson Stadium–Kell Field • Jonesboro, AR | W 11–5 | | 2–0 | – |
| Feb. 18 | New York Tech | | Tomlinson Stadium–Kell Field • Jonesboro, AR | W 5–2 | 758 | 3–0 | – |
| Feb. 19 | New York Tech | | Tomlinson Stadium–Kell Field • Jonesboro, AR | W 13–5 | 304 | 4–0 | – |
| Feb. 21 | at #14 Ole Miss | | Swayze Field • Oxford, MS | L 16–4 | | 4–1 | – |
| Feb. 22 | Mississippi Valley State | | Tomlinson Stadium–Kell Field • Jonesboro, AR | | | – | – |
| Feb. 24 | at Northwestern State | | Brown–Stroud Field • Natchitoches, LA | | | – | – |
| Feb. 25 | at Northwestern State | | Brown–Stroud Field • Natchitoches, LA | | | – | – |
| Feb. 26 | at Northwestern State | | Brown–Stroud Field • Natchitoches, LA | | | – | – |
| Feb. 28 | Missouri State | | Tomlinson Stadium–Kell Field • Jonesboro, AR | | | – | – |

March (0–0)
| Date | Opponent | Rank | Site | Score | Attendance | Overall record | SBC record |
|---|---|---|---|---|---|---|---|
| Mar. 1 | Missouri State | | Tomlinson Stadium–Kell Field • Jonesboro, AR | | | – | – |
| Mar. 3 | Cincinnati | | Tomlinson Stadium–Kell Field • Jonesboro, AR | | | – | – |
| Mar. 4 | Cincinnati | | Tomlinson Stadium–Kell Field • Jonesboro, AR | | | – | – |
| Mar. 5 | Cincinnati | | Tomlinson Stadium–Kell Field • Jonesboro, AR | | | – | – |
| Mar. 7 | Southeast Missouri State | | Tomlinson Stadium–Kell Field • Jonesboro, AR | | | – | – |
| Mar. 10 | Louisiana Tech | | Tomlinson Stadium–Kell Field • Jonesboro, AR | | | – | – |
| Mar. 11 | Louisiana Tech | | Tomlinson Stadium–Kell Field • Jonesboro, AR | | | – | – |
| Mar. 12 | Louisiana Tech | | Tomlinson Stadium–Kell Field • Jonesboro, AR | | | – | – |
| Mar. 14 | Southern Illinois | | Tomlinson Stadium–Kell Field • Jonesboro, AR | | | – | – |
| Mar. 17 | Louisiana–Monroe | | Tomlinson Stadium–Kell Field • Jonesboro, AR | | | – | – |
| Mar. 18 | Louisiana–Monroe | | Tomlinson Stadium–Kell Field • Jonesboro, AR | | | – | – |
| Mar. 19 | Louisiana–Monroe | | Tomlinson Stadium–Kell Field • Jonesboro, AR | | | – | – |
| Mar. 21 | at Austin Peay | | Raymond C. Hand Park • Clarksville, TN | | | – | – |
| Mar. 22 | at Austin Peay | | Raymond C. Hand Park • Clarksville, TN | | | – | – |
| Mar. 24 | at Coastal Carolina | | Springs Brooks Stadium • Conway, SC | | | – | – |
| Mar. 25 | at Coastal Carolina | | Springs Brooks Stadium • Conway, SC | | | – | – |
| Mar. 26 | at Coastal Carolina | | Springs Brooks Stadium • Conway, SC | | | – | – |
| Mar. 28 | at Southern Illinois | | Abe Martin Field • Carbondale, IL | | | – | – |
| Mar. 31 | at Texas State | | Bobcat Ballpark • San Marcos, TX | | | – | – |

April (0–0)
| Date | Opponent | Rank | Site | Score | Attendance | Overall record | SBC record |
|---|---|---|---|---|---|---|---|
| April 1 | at Texas State | | Bobcat Ballpark • San Marcos, TX | | | – | – |
| April 2 | at Texas State | | Bobcat Ballpark • San Marcos, TX | | | – | – |
| April 4 | at Southeast Missouri State | | Capaha Field • Cape Girardeau, MO | | | – | – |
| April 7 | Georgia State | | Tomlinson Stadium–Kell Field • Jonesboro, AR | | | – | – |
| April 8 | Georgia State | | Tomlinson Stadium–Kell Field • Jonesboro, AR | | | – | – |
| April 9 | Georgia State | | Tomlinson Stadium–Kell Field • Jonesboro, AR | | | – | – |
| April 11 | at Memphis | | FedExPark • Memphis, TN | | | – | – |
| April 13 | at Louisiana–Lafayette | | M. L. Tigue Moore Field • Lafayette, LA | | | – | - |
| April 14 | at Louisiana–Lafayette | | M. L. Tigue Moore Field • Lafayette, LA | | | – | – |
| April 15 | at Louisiana–Lafayette | | M. L. Tigue Moore Field • Lafayette, LA | | | – | – |
| April 21 | South Alabama | | Tomlinson Stadium–Kell Field • Jonesboro, AR | | | – | – |
| April 22 | South Alabama | | Tomlinson Stadium–Kell Field • Jonesboro, AR | | | – | - |
| April 23 | South Alabama | | Tomlinson Stadium–Kell Field • Jonesboro, AR | | | – | - |
| April 25 | Memphis | | Tomlinson Stadium–Kell Field • Jonesboro, AR | | | – | - |
| April 28 | at Appalachian State | | Beaver Field • Boone, NC | | | – | - |
| April 29 | at Appalachian State | | Beaver Field • Boone, NC | | | – | - |
| April 30 | at Appalachian State | | Beaver Field • Boone, NC | | | – | - |

May (0–0)
| Date | Opponent | Rank | Site | Score | Attendance | Overall record | SBC record |
|---|---|---|---|---|---|---|---|
| May 5 | Texas–Arlington | | Tomlinson Stadium–Kell Field • Jonesboro, AR | | | – | - |
| May 6 | Texas–Arlington | | Tomlinson Stadium–Kell Field • Jonesboro, AR | | | – | – |
| May 7 | Texas–Arlington | | Tomlinson Stadium–Kell Field • Jonesboro, AR | | | – | – |
| May 12 | at Georgia Southern | | J. I. Clements Stadium • Statesboro, GA | | | – | – |
| May 13 | at Georgia Southern | | J. I. Clements Stadium • Statesboro, GA | | | – | – |
| May 14 | at Georgia Southern | | J. I. Clements Stadium • Statesboro, GA | | | – | – |
| May 16 | Ole Miss | | Tomlinson Stadium–Kell Field • Jonesboro, AR | | | – | – |
| May 18 | Little Rock | | Tomlinson Stadium–Kell Field • Jonesboro, AR | | | – | – |
| May 19 | Little Rock | | Tomlinson Stadium–Kell Field • Jonesboro, AR | | | – | – |
| May 20 | Little Rock | | Tomlinson Stadium–Kell Field • Jonesboro, AR | | | – | – |

Postseason

SBC Tournament
| Date | Opponent | Rank | Site | Score | Attendance | Overall record | SBCT Record |
|---|---|---|---|---|---|---|---|
| May 24 | TBD | | J. I. Clements Stadium • Statesboro, GA | | | – | – |

- Rankings are based on the team's current ranking in the Collegiate Baseball poll.
