= 2020 Troy Trojans baseball team =

American college baseball team

2020 Troy Trojans baseball
- Conference: Sun Belt Conference
- East Division
- Record: 9–8 (0–0 SBC)
- Head coach: Mark Smartt (5th season)
- Assistant coaches: Shane Gierke; Matt Hancock
- Home stadium: Riddle–Pace Field

2020 Sun Belt Conference baseball standings
	Conf.				Overall
Team	W		L	PCT	W		L	PCT
East Division
Coastal Carolina ‍‍‍	0	–	0	–	11	–	5	.688
Georgia Southern ‍‍‍	0	–	0	–	11	–	5	.688
Appalachian State ‍‍‍	0	–	0	–	11	–	6	.647
Georgia State ‍‍‍	0	–	0	–	9	–	7	.563
Troy ‍‍‍	0	–	0	–	9	–	8	.529
South Alabama ‍‍‍	0	–	0	–	8	–	10	.444
West Division
Texas State ‍‍‍	0	–	0	–	14	–	4	.778
UT Arlington ‍‍‍	0	–	0	–	12	–	4	.750
Louisiana–Monroe ‍‍‍	0	–	0	–	12	–	5	.706
Little Rock ‍‍‍	0	–	0	–	9	–	8	.529
Louisiana ‍‍‍	0	–	0	–	8	–	9	.471
Arkansas State ‍‍‍	0	–	0	–	7	–	9	.438
x – Division champion ‡ – Tournament champion y – Invited to the NCAA tournament As of March 12, 2020; Rankings from D1Baseball

The 2020 Troy Trojans baseball team represented Troy University in the 2020 NCAA Division I baseball season. The Trojans played their home games at Riddle–Pace Field and were led by fifth year head coach Mark Smartt.

On March 12, the Sun Belt Conference announced the indefinite suspension of all spring athletics, including baseball, due to the increasing risk of the COVID-19 pandemic.

== Preseason ==
=== Signing Day Recruits ===
Player	Hometown	Previous Team
Pitchers
Jerry Dale Bowman	Smiths Station, Alabama	Wallace State CC
Beau Fletcher	Hartselle, Alabama	Hartselle HS
Garrett Gainous	Cairo, Georgia	Cairo HS
Kyle Gamble	Live Oak, Florida	Polk State
Dominick Miller	Pensacola, Florida	Pensacola State
Tekoah Roby	Pensacola, Florida	Pine Forest HS
Grayson Stewart	Dothan, Alabama	Providence Christian
Hitters
Seth Johnson	Wetumpka, Alabama	Wetumpka HS

=== Sun Belt Conference Coaches Poll ===
The Sun Belt Conference Coaches Poll was released sometime on January 30, 2020 and the Trojans were picked to finish fourth in the East Division.

Coaches poll (East)
Predicted finish	Team	Votes (1st place)
1	South Alabama	62 (6)
2	Coastal Carolina	61 (4)
3	Georgia Southern	50 (2)
4	Troy	41
5	Appalachian State	23
6	Georgia State	15

=== Preseason All-Sun Belt Team & Honors ===
- Drake Nightengale (USA, Sr, Pitcher)
- Zach McCambley (CCU, Jr, Pitcher)
- Levi Thomas (TROY, Jr, Pitcher)
- Andrew Papp (APP, Sr, Pitcher)
- Jack Jumper (ARST, Sr, Pitcher)
- Kale Emshoff (LR, RS-Jr, Catcher)
- Kaleb DeLatorre (USA, Sr, First Base)
- Luke Drumheller (APP, So, Second Base)
- Hayden Cantrelle (LA, Jr, Shortstop)
- Garrett Scott (LR, RS-Sr, Third Base)
- Mason McWhorter (GASO, Sr, Outfielder)
- Ethan Wilson (USA, So, Outfielder)
- Rigsby Mosley (TROY, Jr, Outfielder)
- Will Hollis (TXST, Sr, Designated Hitter)
- Andrew Beesley (ULM, Sr, Utility)

== Personnel ==
=== Roster ===
2020 Troy Trojans roster
Pitchers: 3 Matt Snell - Freshman; 11 Orlando Ortiz - Freshman; 13 Tyson Ellis - Sophomore; 14 Bay Witcher - Sophomore; 16 Cory Gill - Senior; 20 Lance Johnson - Senior; 22 Marquez Oates - Junior; 23 Max Newton - Senior; 24 Ryan Fultz - Senior; 26 Noah Janney - Freshman; 28 Zach Lightsey - Senior; 29 Nicholas Barber - Freshman; 32 Will Carnley - Senior; 35 Cameron Stewart - Redshirt Freshman; 36 DJ Wilkinson - Junior; 37 Peyton Wesson - Freshman; 39 Dalton Wilder - Junior; 40 Levi Thomas - Junior; 42 Zach Moore - Senior	Catchers: 8 Caleb Bartolero - Sophomore; 38 Brady Sherrill - Junior; 46 Briley Reeves - Senior; Infielders: 1 Drew Frederic - Senior; 2 Jesse Hall - Junior; 4 Austin Garofalo - Junior; 7 Kyle Mock - Freshman; 10 Jacob Cendoya - Freshman; 17 Easton Kirk - Junior; 18 Tanner Jackson - Sophomore; 30 William Sullivan - Freshman; 31 Donovan Whibbs - Sophomore; 33 Taylor Pridgen - Sophomore; 44 Hunter Mercer - Senior; Outfielders: 5 Reed Smith - Junior; 6 Logan Cerny - Sophomore; 15 Dalton Sinquefield - Senior; 21 Rigsby Mosley - Junior; 43 Hudson Hartsfield - Redshirt Freshman

=== Coaching staff ===
2020 Troy Trojans coaching staff
- Mark Smartt – Head Coach – 5th year
- Shane Gierke – Assistant Head Coach– 5th year
- Matt Hancock – Assistant Head Coach – 2nd year
- Peyton Fuller – Volunteer Assistant Coach – 4th year

== Schedule and results ==
Legend
	Troy win
	Troy loss
	Postponement/Cancelation/Suspensions
**Bold**	Troy team member

2020 Troy Trojans baseball game log
Regular season (9-8)

February (8-3)
Date	Opponent	Rank	Site/stadium	Score	Win	Loss	Save	TV	Attendance	Overall record	SBC record
Feb. 14	Northern Kentucky		Riddle–Pace Field • Troy, AL	**W** 18-6	**Thomas** (1-0)	Lonsbury (0-1)	None		1,341	1-0	
Feb. 15	Northern Kentucky		Riddle–Pace Field • Troy, AL	**W** 17-3	**Ortiz** (1-0)	Noble (0-1)	None		1,679	2-0	
Feb. 15	Northern Kentucky		Riddle–Pace Field • Troy, AL	**W** 12-2	**Newton** (1-0)	Mercer (0-1)	None		1,791	3-0	
Feb. 16	Northern Kentucky		Riddle–Pace Field • Troy, AL	**W** 20-11	**Oates** (1-0)	Lange (0-1)	None		1,212	4-0	
Feb. 19	Jackson State		Riddle–Pace Field • Troy, AL	**W** 14-5	**Fultz** (1-0)	Colon (0-1)	None		1,241	5-0	
Feb. 21	Louisiana Tech		Riddle–Pace Field • Troy, AL	**W** 4-0	**Thomas** (2-0)	Fincher (1-1)	**Johnson** (1)		1,399	6-0	
Feb. 22	Louisiana Tech		Riddle–Pace Field • Troy, AL	**W** 7-4	**Oates** (2-0)	Crigger (0-1)	**Wilkinson** (1)		2,053	7-0	
Feb. 23	Louisiana Tech		Riddle–Pace Field • Troy, AL	**L** 0-9	Whorff (2-0)	**Newton** (1-1)	None		1,567	7-1	
Feb. 25	Alabama State		Riddle–Pace Field • Troy, AL	**W** 5-0	**Oates** (3-0)	Rivera (2-1)	None		1,511	8-1	
Feb. 28	at No. 1 Florida		Alfred A. McKethan Stadium • Gainesville, FL	**L** 2-3	Mace (0-2)	**Johnson** (0-1)	Specht (1)		3,377	8-2	
Feb. 29	at No. 1 Florida		Alfred A. McKethan Stadium • Gainesville, FL	**L** 7-10	Luethje (1-0)	**Wilder** (0-1)	Specht (2)		4,140	8-3	

March (1-5)
Date	Opponent	Rank	Site/stadium	Score	Win	Loss	Save	TV	Attendance	Overall record	SBC record
Mar. 1	at No. 1 Florida		Alfred A. McKethan Stadium • Gainesville, FL	**L** 1-7	Barco (0-2)	**Ellis** (0-1)	None		4,001	8-4	
Mar. 3	at UAB		Jerry D. Young Memorial Field • Birmingham, AL	**L** 2-5	Bonk (1-1)	**Newton** (1-2)	McCarty (5)		377	8-5	
Pensacola Cox Diamond Invitational
Mar. 6	vs. Michigan State		Blue Wahoos Stadium • Pensacola, FL	**L** 0-1	Mason (2-0)	**Thomas** (2-1)	Sleeman (1)		814	8-6	
Mar. 7	vs. Samford		Blue Wahoos Stadium • Pensacola, FL	**W** 5-3	**Ortiz** (2-0)	Long (0-2)	**Wilkinson** (2)		936	9-6	
Mar. 8	vs. Louisiana		Blue Wahoos Stadium • Pensacola, FL	**L** 4-8	Moriarty (1-2)	**Ellis** (0-2)	None		919	9-6	
Mar. 10	vs. Southern Miss		Montgomery Riverwalk Stadium • Montgomery, AL	**L** 7-9	Lantz (1-0)	**Wilkinson** (0-1)	Stanley (3)		1,085	9-7	
Mar. 13	at Georgia Southern		J. I. Clements Stadium • Statesboro, GA	Season suspended due to COVID-19 pandemic							
Mar. 14	at Georgia Southern		J. I. Clements Stadium • Statesboro, GA	Season suspended due to COVID-19 pandemic							
Mar. 15	at Georgia Southern		J. I. Clements Stadium • Statesboro, GA	Season suspended due to COVID-19 pandemic							
Mar. 20	Little Rock		Riddle–Pace Field • Troy, AL	Season suspended due to COVID-19 pandemic							
Mar. 21	Little Rock		Riddle–Pace Field • Troy, AL	Season suspended due to COVID-19 pandemic							
Mar. 22	Little Rock		Riddle–Pace Field • Troy, AL	Season suspended due to COVID-19 pandemic							
Mar. 24	No. 14 Arkansas		Riddle–Pace Field • Troy, AL	Season suspended due to COVID-19 pandemic							
Mar. 25	No. 14 Arkansas		Riddle–Pace Field • Troy, AL	Season suspended due to COVID-19 pandemic							
Mar. 27	at UT Arlington		Clay Gould Ballpark • Arlington, TX	Season suspended due to COVID-19 pandemic							
Mar. 28	at UT Arlington		Clay Gould Ballpark • Arlington, TX	Season suspended due to COVID-19 pandemic							
Mar. 29	at UT Arlington		Clay Gould Ballpark • Arlington, TX	Season suspended due to COVID-19 pandemic							
Mar. 31	Jacksonville State		Riddle–Pace Field • Troy, AL	Season suspended due to COVID-19 pandemic							

April (0-0)
Date	Opponent	Rank	Site/stadium	Score	Win	Loss	Save	TV	Attendance	Overall record	SBC record
Apr. 3	at Arkansas State		Tomlinson Stadium–Kell Field • Jonesboro, AR	Season suspended due to COVID-19 pandemic							
Apr. 4	at Arkansas State		Tomlinson Stadium–Kell Field • Jonesboro, AR	Season suspended due to COVID-19 pandemic							
Apr. 5	at Arkansas State		Tomlinson Stadium–Kell Field • Jonesboro, Ar	Season suspended due to COVID-19 pandemic							
Apr. 9	Georgia State		Riddle–Pace Field • Troy, AL	Season suspended due to COVID-19 pandemic							
Apr. 10	Georgia State		Riddle–Pace Field • Troy, AL	Season suspended due to COVID-19 pandemic							
Apr. 11	Georgia State		Riddle–Pace Field • Troy, AL	Season suspended due to COVID-19 pandemic							
Apr. 14	at Alabama State		Montgomery Riverwalk Stadium • Montgomery, AL	Season suspended due to COVID-19 pandemic							
Apr. 15	at Jacksonville State		Rudy Abbott Field • Jacksonville, AL	Season suspended due to COVID-19 pandemic							
Apr. 17	at Appalachian State		Beaver Field at Jim and Bettie Smith Stadium • Boone, NC	Season suspended due to COVID-19 pandemic							
Apr. 18	at Appalachian State		Beaver Field at Jim and Bettie Smith Stadium • Boone, NC	Season suspended due to COVID-19 pandemic							
Apr. 19	at Appalachian State		Beaver Field at Jim and Bettie Smith Stadium • Boone, NC	Season suspended due to COVID-19 pandemic							
Apr. 21	UAB		Riddle–Pace Field • Troy, AL	Season suspended due to COVID-19 pandemic							
Apr. 22	Alabama A&M		Riddle–Pace Field • Troy, AL	Season suspended due to COVID-19 pandemic							
Apr. 24	Coastal Carolina		Riddle–Pace Field • Troy, AL	Season suspended due to COVID-19 pandemic							
Apr. 25	Coastal Carolina		Riddle–Pace Field • Troy, AL	Season suspended due to COVID-19 pandemic							
Apr. 26	Coastal Carolina		Riddle–Pace Field • Troy, AL	Season suspended due to COVID-19 pandemic							
Apr. 28	Samford		Riddle–Pace Field • Troy, AL	Season suspended due to COVID-19 pandemic							

May (0–0)
Date	Opponent	Rank	Site/stadium	Score	Win	Loss	Save	TV	Attendance	Overall record	SBC record
May 1	Texas State		Riddle–Pace Field • Troy, AL	Season suspended due to COVID-19 pandemic							
May 2	Texas State		Riddle–Pace Field • Troy, AL	Season suspended due to COVID-19 pandemic							
May 3	Texas State		Riddle–Pace Field • Troy, AL	Season suspended due to COVID-19 pandemic							
May 8	at Louisiana–Monroe		Warhawk Field • Monroe, LA	Season suspended due to COVID-19 pandemic							
May 9	at Louisiana–Monroe		Warhawk Field • Monroe, LA	Season suspended due to COVID-19 pandemic							
May 10	at Louisiana–Monroe		Warhawk Field • Monroe, LA	Season suspended due to COVID-19 pandemic							
May 12	at Alabama		Sewell–Thomas Stadium • Tuscaloosa, AL	Season suspended due to COVID-19 pandemic							
May 14	South Alabama		Riddle–Pace Field • Troy, AL	Season suspended due to COVID-19 pandemic							
May 15	South Alabama		Riddle–Pace Field • Troy, AL	Season suspended due to COVID-19 pandemic							
May 16	South Alabama		Riddle–Pace Field • Troy, AL	Season suspended due to COVID-19 pandemic							

Post-season (0–0)

SBC Tournament (0–0)
Date	Opponent	Seed/Rank	Site/stadium	Score	Win	Loss	Save	TV	Attendance	Overall record	SBC record
May 20			Montgomery Riverwalk Stadium • Montgomery, AL	Tournament canceled due to COVID-19 pandemic							

Schedule source:

*Rankings are based on the team's current ranking in the D1Baseball poll.
