= Mark Smartt =

American baseball coach

Playing career
- 1984–1985: DeKalb Central J. C.
- 1986–1987: Troy
- Position: OF

Coaching career (HC unless noted)
- 1988–1989: Troy (GA)
- 1990–1994: West Alabama (asst.)
- 1995–2000: West Alabama
- 2003–2015: Troy (asst.)
- 2016–2021: Troy

Head coaching record
- Overall: 330–295
- Tournaments: Sun Belt: 5–8; NCAA: 0–0

Mark Smartt is an American baseball coach. He played at DeKalb Central Junior College and Troy State, where he earned All-Conference honors and helped the team to two NCAA Division II College World Series championships. He served as a graduate assistant for the Troy State Trojans before becoming an assistant at the University of West Alabama. He was promoted to the head coach of West Alabama in 1994. He served as an assistant coach at Troy State for thirteen years before ascending to the top job. On June 28, 2021, Smartt and Troy mutually agreed to part ways.

== Head coaching record ==
Record table
Season	Team	Overall	Conference	Standing	Postseason
West Alabama Tigers (Gulf South Conference) (1995–2000)
1995	West Alabama	28–26	13–7	2nd (West)	
1996	West Alabama	22–32	8–13	6th (East)	
1997	West Alabama	29–24	8–12	5th (East)	
1998	West Alabama	28–27	8–12	6th (East)	
1999	West Alabama	30–25	7–13	7th (East)	
2000	West Alabama	27–29	7–14	7th (East)	
West Alabama:		164–163	51–71		
Troy Trojans (Sun Belt Conference) (2016–2021)
2016	Troy	32–26	17–13	T-3rd	Sun Belt Tournament
2017	Troy	31–25	16–14	4th (East)	Sun Belt Tournament
2018	Troy	38–18	19–11	2nd (East)	Sun Belt Tournament
2019	Troy	31–29	16–14	T-3rd (East)	Sun Belt Tournament
2020	Troy	9–8	0–0	(East)	Season canceled due to COVID-19
2021	Troy	27–26	13–11	3rd (East)	Sun Belt Tournament
Troy:		168–132	78–63		
Total:		330–295			
National champion Postseason invitational champion Conference regular season champion Conference regular season and conference tournament champion Division regular season champion Division regular season and conference tournament champion Conference tournament champion
