= 2017 Georgia State Panthers baseball team =

American college baseball season

2017 Georgia State Panthers baseball
- Conference: Sun Belt Conference
- East Division
- Record: 22–32 (6–15 SBC)
- Head coach: Greg Frady (10th season)
- Home stadium: GSU Baseball Complex

2017 Sun Belt Conference baseball standings
| | Conf. | | | | | | Overall |
| Team | W | | L | | T | PCT | W | | L | | T | PCT |
|---|---|---|---|---|---|---|---|---|---|---|---|---|
East Division
| Coastal Carolina^{x}^{†} ‍‍‍ | 22 | – | 7 | – | 1 | .750 | 37 | – | 19 | – | 1 | .658 |
| No. 26 South Alabama^{‡}^{y} ‍‍‍ | 22 | – | 8 | – | 0 | .733 | 40 | – | 21 | – | 0 | .656 |
| Georgia Southern ‍‍‍ | 18 | – | 12 | – | 0 | .600 | 38 | – | 21 | – | 0 | .644 |
| Troy ‍‍‍ | 16 | – | 14 | – | 0 | .533 | 31 | – | 25 | – | 0 | .554 |
| Georgia State ‍‍‍ | 10 | – | 20 | – | 0 | .333 | 22 | – | 33 | – | 0 | .400 |
| Appalachian State ‍‍‍ | 8 | – | 22 | – | 0 | .267 | 19 | – | 36 | – | 0 | .345 |
West Division
| UT Arlington^{x} ‍‍‍ | 20 | – | 10 | – | 0 | .667 | 30 | – | 25 | – | 0 | .545 |
| Louisiana–Lafayette ‍‍‍ | 19 | – | 10 | – | 1 | .650 | 35 | – | 21 | – | 1 | .623 |
| Arkansas State ‍‍‍ | 13 | – | 16 | – | 0 | .448 | 28 | – | 27 | – | 0 | .509 |
| Texas State ‍‍‍ | 13 | – | 17 | – | 0 | .433 | 29 | – | 30 | – | 0 | .492 |
| Little Rock ‍‍‍ | 11 | – | 18 | – | 0 | .379 | 21 | – | 34 | – | 0 | .382 |
| Louisiana–Monroe ‍‍‍ | 6 | – | 24 | – | 0 | .200 | 12 | – | 43 | – | 0 | .218 |
x – Division champion † – Conference champion ‡ – Tournament champion y – Invited to the NCAA tournament Rankings from Collegiate Baseball

The 2017 Georgia State Panthers baseball team represented Georgia State University in the 2017 NCAA Division I baseball season. The Panthers played their home games at the GSU Baseball Complex.

== Personnel ==
=== 2017 Roster ===
2017 Georgia State Panthers roster
| Pitchers: 11 Brandon Baker – (redshirt) Junior; 17 Tyler Elwer – Senior; 23 Logan Barnette – (redshirt) Sophomore; 27 Dillon Swaggerty – (redshirt) Senior; 28 Bryan White – (redshirt) Junior; 29 Bryce Conley – Senior; 31 Devin Vainer – Senior; 40 Liam Henry – (redshirt) Sophomore'; Hunter Gaddis – Freshman; Tyler Koch – Freshman; Jordan Lee – Freshman; Emory Otott – Freshman; Tanner Thomson – Junior | Catchers: 5 Nick Gatewood – Sophomore; 18 Brandon Gonzalez – Junior; 25 Zach Wingate – Senior; Infielders: 1 Justin Jones – Junior; 15 Will Kilgore – Junior; 20 Jarrett Hood – Senior; 24 Darius Sewell – Sophomore; 34 Jack Thompson – Junior; Kendall Ford – (redshirt) Junior; Romero Greer – Junior; Mike Huggins – Junior | Outfielders: 2 Rhett Harper – Junior; 7 Jaylen Woullard – Senior; 12 Luke Leonard – (redshirt) Sophomore; 16 Ryan Blanton – Senior; 19 Cam Sperry – (redshirt) Senior |

http://www.georgiastatesports.com/SportSelect.dbml?&DB_OEM_ID=12700&SPID=5651&SPSID=53505

=== Coaching staff ===
2017 Georgia State Panthers baseball coaching staff
- 10 Greg Frady – Head coach – 10th year
- NA Chris Bootcheck – Assistant coach/Pitching coach – 1st year
- NA Adam Pavkovich – Assistant coach/Recruiting coordinator – 2nd year
- NA Brock Bennett – Assistant coach – 2nd year

== Schedule ==
2017 Georgia State Panthers baseball game log
Regular season
February

| # | Date | Opponent | Venue | Score | Overall Record | SBC Record |
|---|---|---|---|---|---|---|
| 1 | February 17 | Marshall | GSU Baseball Complex | 8–3 | 1–0 | – |
| 2 | February 18 | Western Michiganl | GSU Baseball Complex | 6–4 | 2–0 | – |
| 3 | February 20 | BYU | GSU Baseball Complex | 3–2 | 3–0 | – |
| 4 | February 21 | Kennesaw State | Kennesaw, GA | Cancelled | – | – |
| 5 | February 24 | Jacksonville | Jacksonville, FL | 8–9 | 3–1 | – |
| 6 | February 25 | Jacksonville | Jacksonville, FL | 2–7 | 3–2 | – |
| 7 | February 26 | Jacksonville | Jacksonville, FL | 5–2 | 4–2 | – |
| 8 | February 28 | Georgia Tech | Atlanta, GA | 5–12 | 4–3 | – |

March

| # | Date | Opponent | Venue | Score | Overall Record | SBC Record |
|---|---|---|---|---|---|---|
| 9 | March 3 | Northern Kentucky | GSU Baseball Complex | 10–6 | 5–3 | – |
| 10 | March 4 | Northern Kentucky | GSU Baseball Complex | 12–4 | 6–3 | – |
| 11 | March 5 | Northern Kentucky | GSU Baseball Complex | 7–8 | 6–4 | – |
| 12 | March 7 | #16 Ole Miss | Oxford, MS | 0–1 | 6–5 | – |
| 13 | March 8 | #16 Ole Miss | Oxford, MS | 2–0 | 7–5 | – |
| 14 | March 10 | Bowling Green | Emerson, GA | 4–1 | 6–6 | – |
| 15 | March 11 | Army | Emerson, GA | 3–1 | 7–6 | – |
| 16 | March 12 | Bowling Green | Emerson, GA | 6–3 | 7–7 | – |
| 17 | March 12 | Army | Emerson, GA | 5–2 | 8–7 | – |
| 18 | March 14 | Savannah State | GSU Baseball Complex | Cancelled | – | – |
| 19 | March 15 | #12 Oklahoma | GSU Baseball Complex | 4–5 | 8–8 | – |
| 20 | March 17 | Texas–Arlington | GSU Baseball Complex | 7–10 | 8–9 | 0–1 |
| 21 | March 18 | Texas–Arlington | GSU Baseball Complex | 2–1 | 9–9 | 1–1 |
| 22 | March 19 | Texas–Arlington | GSU Baseball Complex | 7–1 | 9–10 | 1–2 |
| 23 | March 21 | Furman | GSU Baseball Complex | 5–0 | 10–10 | 1–2 |
| 24 | March 24 | South Alabama | Mobile, AL | 7–0 | 10–11 | 1–3 |
| 25 | March 25 | South Alabama | Mobile, AL | 16–6 | 10–12 | 1–4 |
| 26 | March 26 | South Alabama | Mobile, AL | 19–9 | 10–13 | 1–5 |
| 27 | March 29 | Kennesaw State | GSU Baseball Complex | 10–7 | 10–14 | 1–5 |
| 28 | March 31 | Coastal Carolina | GSU Baseball Complex | 4–0 | 10–15 | 1–6 |

April

| # | Date | Opponent | Venue | Score | Overall Record | SBC Record |
|---|---|---|---|---|---|---|
| 29 | April 1 | Coastal Carolina | GSU Baseball Complex | 8–5 | 10–16 | 1–7 |
| 30 | April 2 | Coastal Carolina | GSU Baseball Complex | 17–0 | 10–17 | 1–8 |
| 31 | April 5 | Mercer | Macon, GA | Cancelled | – | – |
| 32 | April 7 | Arkansas State | Jonesboro, AR | 14–1 | 10–18 | 1–9 |
| 33 | April 8 | Arkansas State | Jonesboro, AR | 4–2 | 10–19 | 1–10 |
| 34 | April 9 | Arkansas State | Jonesboro, AR | 10–5 | 10–20 | 1–11 |
| 35 | April 11 | Mercer | GSU Baseball Complex | 11–4 | 10–21 | 1–11 |
| 36 | April 13 | Troy | GSU Baseball Complex | 9–3 | 11–21 | 2–11 |
| 37 | April 14 | Troy | GSU Baseball Complex | 3–2 | 12–21 | 3–11 |
| 38 | April 15 | Troy | GSU Baseball Complex | 5–3 | 12–22 | 3–12 |
| 39 | April 19 | Georgia Tech | GSU Baseball Complex | 7–0 | 12–23 | 3–12 |
| 40 | April 21 | Appalachian State | Boone, NC | 8–6 | 13–23 | 4–12 |
| 41 | April 22 | Appalachian State | Boone, NC | 6–1 | 13–24 | 4–13 |
| 42 | April 23 | Appalachian State | Boone, NC | 13–1 | 13–25 | 4–14 |
| 43 | April 28 | Louisiana–Monroe | GSU Baseball Complex | 4–3 | 13–26 | 4–15 |
| 44 | April 29 | Louisiana–Monroe | GSU Baseball Complex | 4–3 | 14–26 | 5–15 |
| 45 | April 30 | Louisiana–Monroe | GSU Baseball Complex | 6–1 | 15–26 | 6–15 |

May

| # | Date | Opponent | Venue | Score | Overall Record | SBC Record |
|---|---|---|---|---|---|---|
| 46 | May 2 | Minnesota | Minneapolis, MN | 9–1 | 15–27 | 6–15 |
| 47 | May 3 | Minnesota | Minneapolis, MN | 7–5 | 16–27 | 6–15 |
| 48 | May 5 | Texas State | San Marcos, TX | 11–7 | 17–27 | 7–15 |
| 49 | May 6 | Texas State | San Marcos, TX | 10–9 | 17–28 | 7–16 |
| 50 | May 7 | Texas State | San Marcos, TX | 11–8 | 18–28 | 8–16 |
| 51 | May 10 | Savannah State | GSU Baseball Complex | 3–0 | 19–28 | 8–16 |
| 52 | May 12 | Little Rock | Little Rock, AR | 8–3 | 19–29 | 8–17 |
| 53 | May 13 | Little Rock | Little Rock, AR | 4–6 | 19–30 | 8–18 |
| 54 | May 14 | Little Rock | Little Rock, AR | 16–1 | 20–30 | 9–18 |
| 55 | May 18 | Georgia Southern | GSU Baseball Complex | 9–7 | 21–30 | 10–18 |
| 56 | May 19 | Georgia Southern | GSU Baseball Complex | 7–6 | 22–30 | 11–18 |
| 57 | May 20 | Georgia Southern | GSU Baseball Complex | 13–3 | 22–31 | 11–19 |

Sun Belt Championship

| # | Date | Opponent | Venue | Score | Overall Record | SBC Record |
|---|---|---|---|---|---|---|
| 58 | May 28 | Arkansas State | Statesboro, GA | 4–21 | 22–32 | 6–15 |
