= 2017 Georgia Southern Eagles baseball team =

American college baseball season

2017 Georgia Southern Eagles baseball
- Conference: Sun Belt Conference
- East Division
- Record: 38–21 (18–12 SBC)
- Head coach: Rodney Hennon (17th season)
- Home stadium: J. I. Clements Stadium

2017 Sun Belt Conference baseball standings
	Conf.						Overall
Team	W		L		T	PCT	W		L		T	PCT
East Division
Coastal Carolina^{x}^{†} ‍‍‍	22	–	7	–	1	.750	37	–	19	–	1	.658
No. 26 South Alabama^{‡}^{y} ‍‍‍	22	–	8	–	0	.733	40	–	21	–	0	.656
Georgia Southern ‍‍‍	18	–	12	–	0	.600	38	–	21	–	0	.644
Troy ‍‍‍	16	–	14	–	0	.533	31	–	25	–	0	.554
Georgia State ‍‍‍	10	–	20	–	0	.333	22	–	33	–	0	.400
Appalachian State ‍‍‍	8	–	22	–	0	.267	19	–	36	–	0	.345
West Division
UT Arlington^{x} ‍‍‍	20	–	10	–	0	.667	30	–	25	–	0	.545
Louisiana–Lafayette ‍‍‍	19	–	10	–	1	.650	35	–	21	–	1	.623
Arkansas State ‍‍‍	13	–	16	–	0	.448	28	–	27	–	0	.509
Texas State ‍‍‍	13	–	17	–	0	.433	29	–	30	–	0	.492
Little Rock ‍‍‍	11	–	18	–	0	.379	21	–	34	–	0	.382
Louisiana–Monroe ‍‍‍	6	–	24	–	0	.200	12	–	43	–	0	.218
x – Division champion † – Conference champion ‡ – Tournament champion y – Invited to the NCAA tournament Rankings from Collegiate Baseball

The 2017 Georgia Southern Eagles baseball team represented the Georgia Southern Eagles in the 2017 NCAA Division I baseball season. The Eagles played their home games at J. I. Clements Stadium.

== Schedule and results ==
Georgia Southern announced its 2017 football schedule on October 20, 2016. The 2017 schedule consisted of 29 home and 27 away games in the regular season. The Eagles hosted Sun Belts foes Appalachian State, Arkansas State, Little Rock, Louisiana–Monroe, and South Alabama and will travel to Coastal Carolina, Georgia State, Louisiana–Lafayette, Texas–Arlington Mavericks, and Troy.

The 2017 Sun Belt Conference Championship was contested May 24–28 in Statesboro, Georgia, and was hosted by the Eagles.

Georgia Southern finished 3rd in the east division of the conference which qualified the Eagles to compete in the tournament as the 5th seed for the team's 1st Sun Belt Conference tournament title.

2017 Georgia Southern baseball game log
Regular season (36–20)

February (3–4)
Date	Opponent	Rank	Site	Score	Attendance	Overall record	SBC record
Feb. 17	Middle Tennessee		J. I. Clements Stadium • Statesboro, GA	L 6–5	1,596	0–1	–
Feb. 18	Middle Tennessee		J. I. Clements Stadium • Statesboro, GA	W 7–6	982	1–1	–
Feb. 19	Middle Tennessee		J. I. Clements Stadium • Statesboro, GA	W 8–5	1,163	2–1	–
Feb. 21	Georgia Tech		J. I. Clements Stadium • Statesboro, GA	L 10–3	1,851	2–2	–
Feb. 24	Georgia		J. I. Clements Stadium • Statesboro, GA	L 4–3	2,670	2–3	–
Feb. 25	Georgia		J. I. Clements Stadium • Statesboro, GA	L 7–0	3,435	2–4	–
Feb. 26	Georgia		J. I. Clements Stadium • Statesboro, GA	W 2–1	1,857	3–4	–

March (13–6)
Date	Opponent	Rank	Site	Score	Attendance	Overall record	SBC record
Mar. 1	College of Charleston		J. I. Clements Stadium • Statesboro, GA	W 14–7	722	4–4	–
Mar. 3	at Memphis		FedExPark • Memphis, TN	L 5–2	497	4–5	–
Mar. 4	at Memphis		FedExPark • Memphis, TN	W 7–6	518	5–5	–
Mar. 5	at Memphis		FedExPark • Memphis, TN	L 9–8	347	5–6	–
Mar. 7	Campbell		J. I. Clements Stadium • Statesboro, GA	W 8–2	648	6–6	–
Mar. 8	Campbell		J. I. Clements Stadium • Statesboro, GA	W 9–8	641	7–6	–
Mar. 10	at Elon		Walter C. Latham Park • Elon, NC	L 8–6		7–7	–
Mar. 10	at Elon		Walter C. Latham Park • Elon, NC	W 7–0	277	8–7	–
Mar. 11	at Elon		Walter C. Latham Park • Elon, NC	W 5–1	184	9–7	–
Mar. 17	South Alabama		J. I. Clements Stadium • Statesboro, GA	W 8–5	611	10–7	1–0
Mar. 18	South Alabama		J. I. Clements Stadium • Statesboro, GA	L 19–6	1,816	10–8	1–1
Mar. 19	South Alabama		J. I. Clements Stadium • Statesboro, GA	L 5–0	712	10–9	1–2
Mar. 21	at The Citadel		Joseph P. Riley Jr. Park • Charleston, SC	W 7–3	442	11–9	–
Mar. 22	The Citadel		J. I. Clements Stadium • Statesboro, GA	W 1–0	723	12–9	–
Mar. 24	at Texas–Arlington		Clay Gould Ballpark • Arlington, TX	L 3–2	310	12–10	1–3
Mar. 25	at Texas–Arlington		Clay Gould Ballpark • Arlington, TX	W 4–3	474	13–10	2–3
Mar. 26	at Texas–Arlington		Clay Gould Ballpark • Arlington, TX	W 9–5	339	14–10	3–3
Mar. 28	at College of Charleston		CofC Baseball Stadium • Mount Pleasant, SC	W 8–4	321	15–10	–
Mar. 31	Louisiana–Monroe		J. I. Clements Stadium • Statesboro, GA	W 9–3	726	16–10	4–3

April (14–5)
Date	Opponent	Rank	Site	Score	Attendance	Overall record	SBC record
April 1	Louisiana–Monroe		J. I. Clements Stadium • Statesboro, GA	L 5–4	547	16–11	4–4
April 2	Louisiana–Monroe		J. I. Clements Stadium • Statesboro, GA	W 9–0	706	17–11	5–4
April 4	Savannah State		J. I. Clements Stadium • Statesboro, GA	W 11–7	725	18–11	–
April 7	at Troy		Riddle–Pace Field • Troy, AL	W 5–3	1,001	19–11	6–4
April 8	at Troy		Riddle–Pace Field • Troy, AL	W 6–3	1,421	20–11	7–4
April 9	at Troy		Riddle–Pace Field • Troy, AL	L 4–0	812	20–12	7–5
April 11	Kennesaw State		J. I. Clements Stadium • Statesboro, GA	W 8–4	808	21–12	–
April 13	Appalachian State		J. I. Clements Stadium • Statesboro, GA	W 6–2	909	22–12	8–5
April 14	Appalachian State		J. I. Clements Stadium • Statesboro, GA	L 7–3	957	22–13	8–6
April 15	Appalachian State		J. I. Clements Stadium • Statesboro, GA	W 6–4	898	23–13	9–6
April 19	at Savannah State		Tiger Baseball Field • Savannah, GA	W 6–5	185	24–13	–
April 21	at Coastal Carolina		Springs Brooks Stadium • Conway, SC	L 6–5	1,970	24–14	9–7
April 22	at Coastal Carolina		Springs Brooks Stadium • Conway, SC	W 7–6	1,858	25–14	10–7
April 23	at Coastal Carolina		Springs Brooks Stadium • Conway, SC	W 3–2	1,678	26–14	11–7
April 25	at Mercer		Claude Smith Field • Macon, GA	W 15–7	1,068	27–14	-
April 26	Mercer		J. I. Clements Stadium • Statesboro, GA	W 4–3	845	28–14	-
April 28	Little Rock		J. I. Clements Stadium • Statesboro, GA	L 11–4	916	28–15	11–8
April 29	Little Rock		J. I. Clements Stadium • Statesboro, GA	W 5–0	1,133	29–15	12–8
April 30	Little Rock		J. I. Clements Stadium • Statesboro, GA	W 9–2	698	30–15	13–8

May (6–5)
Date	Opponent	Rank	Site	Score	Attendance	Overall record	SBC record
May 5	at Louisiana–Lafayette		M. L. Tigue Moore Field • Lafayette, LA	L 3–0	5,095	30–16	13–9
May 6	at Louisiana–Lafayette		M. L. Tigue Moore Field • Lafayette, LA	W 6–5	4,964	31–16	14–9
May 7	at Louisiana–Lafayette		M. L. Tigue Moore Field • Lafayette, LA	W 9–1	4,998	32–16	15–9
May 10	at Kennesaw State		Fred Stillwell Stadium • Kennesaw, GA	W 6–0	805	33–16	–
May 12	Arkansas State		J. I. Clements Stadium • Statesboro, GA	W 7–4	973	34–16	16–9
May 13	Arkansas State		J. I. Clements Stadium • Statesboro, GA	L 1–0	923	34–17	16–10
May 14	Arkansas State		J. I. Clements Stadium • Statesboro, GA	W 6–1	944	35–17	17–10
May 16	at Georgia Tech		Russ Chandler Stadium • Atlanta, GA	L 12–3	1,205	35–18	–
May 18	at Georgia State		Georgia State Baseball Complex • Atlanta, GA	L 9–7	301	35–19	17–11
May 19	at Georgia State		Georgia State Baseball Complex • Atlanta, GA	L 7–6	321	35–20	17–12
May 20	at Georgia State		Georgia State Baseball Complex • Atlanta, GA	W 13–3	356	36–20	18–12

Postseason (2–1)

SBC Tournament (2–1)
Date	Opponent	Rank	Site	Score	Attendance	Overall record	SBCT record
May 26	vs. Louisiana–Lafayette		J. I. Clements Stadium • Statesboro, GA	W 7–6	1,608	37–20	1–0
May 27	vs. Texas State		J. I. Clements Stadium • Statesboro, GA	W 11–5	1,148	38–20	2–0
May 28	vs. South Alabama		J. I. Clements Stadium • Statesboro, GA	L 7–6	1,467	38–21	2–1

- Rankings are based on the team's current ranking in the Collegiate Baseball poll.
