= 2017 Sun Belt Conference baseball tournament =

- Teams: 10
- Format: Single-elimination
- Finals site: J. I. Clements Stadium; Statesboro, Georgia
- Champions: South Alabama (12th title)
- Winning coach: Mark Calvi (1st title)
- MVP: Brendan Donovan (South Alabama)
- Television: ESPN3

2017 Sun Belt Conference baseball standings
	Conf.						Overall
Team	W		L		T	PCT	W		L		T	PCT
East Division
Coastal Carolina^{x}^{†} ‍‍‍	22	–	7	–	1	.750	37	–	19	–	1	.658
No. 26 South Alabama^{‡}^{y} ‍‍‍	22	–	8	–	0	.733	40	–	21	–	0	.656
Georgia Southern ‍‍‍	18	–	12	–	0	.600	38	–	21	–	0	.644
Troy ‍‍‍	16	–	14	–	0	.533	31	–	25	–	0	.554
Georgia State ‍‍‍	10	–	20	–	0	.333	22	–	33	–	0	.400
Appalachian State ‍‍‍	8	–	22	–	0	.267	19	–	36	–	0	.345
West Division
UT Arlington^{x} ‍‍‍	20	–	10	–	0	.667	30	–	25	–	0	.545
Louisiana–Lafayette ‍‍‍	19	–	10	–	1	.650	35	–	21	–	1	.623
Arkansas State ‍‍‍	13	–	16	–	0	.448	28	–	27	–	0	.509
Texas State ‍‍‍	13	–	17	–	0	.433	29	–	30	–	0	.492
Little Rock ‍‍‍	11	–	18	–	0	.379	21	–	34	–	0	.382
Louisiana–Monroe ‍‍‍	6	–	24	–	0	.200	12	–	43	–	0	.218
x – Division champion † – Conference champion ‡ – Tournament champion y – Invited to the NCAA tournament Rankings from Collegiate Baseball

The 2017 Sun Belt Conference baseball tournament was held at J. I. Clements Stadium on the campus of Georgia Southern University in Statesboro, Georgia, from May 24 to May 28, 2017, using a double-elimination format. The winner of the tournament earned the Sun Belt Conference's automatic bid to the 2017 NCAA Division I baseball tournament.

== Seeding ==
In a change from previous years, the seeding for the tournament was modified with the re-introduction of division play. The #1 seed would be the division winner with the best record, and the other division winner would be the #2 seed. This would reward each division winner for winning their division. Once the #1 seed is determined, the other division winner is automatically granted the #2 seed, even if that team's overall conference record isn't the second best. Seeds 3–10 are then assigned regardless of division based on conference winning percentage, with the bottom four seeds competing in a play-in round. The remaining eight teams will then play a two bracket, double-elimination tournament. The winner of each bracket will play a championship final.

Team	W–L	Pct	Seed
East Division
Coastal Carolina	22–7–1	.750	1
South Alabama	22–8	.733	3
Georgia Southern	18–12	.600	5
Troy	16–14	.533	6
Georgia State	10–20	.333	10
Appalachian State	8–22	.267	–

Team	W–L	Pct	Seed
West Division
Texas-Arlington	20–10	.667	2
Louisiana–Lafayette	19–10–1	.650	4
Arkansas State	13–16	.448	7
Texas State	13–17	.433	8
Little Rock	11–18	.379	9
Louisiana–Monroe	6–24	.200	–

== Schedule ==
Due to poor field conditions and the threat of further inclement weather the first round of the tournament was postponed. Alternative sites and make-up schedules are being examined. On May 24 the Sun Belt announced that the tournament would move to a single elimination format.

Game	Time*	Matchup^{#}	Television	Attendance
Thursday, May 25
1	3:00pm	No. 10 Georgia State vs. No. 7 Arkansas State	ESPN3	
2	6:30pm	No. 9 Little Rock vs. No. 8 Texas State	ESPN3	
Friday, May 26
3	9:00am	No. 6 Troy vs. No. 3 South Alabama	ESPN3	
4	12:30pm	No. 7 Arkansas State vs. No. 2 Texas-Arlington	ESPN3	
5	4:00pm	Winner Game 2 vs. No. 1 Coastal Carolina	ESPN3	
6	7:30pm	No. 5 Georgia Southern vs. No. 4 Louisiana-Lafayette	ESPN3	
Semifinals – Saturday, May 27
7	3:00pm	Winner Game 3 vs. Winner Game 4	ESPN3	
8	6:30pm	Winner Game 5 vs. Winner Game 6	ESPN3	
Championship – Sunday, May 28
9	1:00pm	Winner Game 7 vs. Winner Game 8	ESPN3	
*Game times in EDT. # – Rankings denote tournament seed.

== Bracket ==
=== Play-in round ===
The first two matchups of the tournament were single-elimination and were held on Thursday May 25, 2017.

Thursday, May 25
Team	R
(10) Georgia State	4
(7) Arkansas State	21^{7}

Thursday, May 25
Team	R
(9) Little Rock	2
(8) Texas State	3

=== Single-elimination round ===
Coastal Carolina faced the team that won on the day before with the lowest seed with the other winner against Texas-Arlington. The tournament was originally scheduled to be a double elimination tournament. Due to weather and poor field conditions they had to make the tournament single elimination.

Quarterfinals; ESPN3
1	Coastal Carolina	5
8	Texas State	7
4	Louisiana–Lafayette	6
5	Georgia Southern	7^{11}
2	Texas–Arlington	2
7	Arkansas State	4
3	South Alabama	9
6	Troy	1

Semifinals; ESPN3
8	Texas State	5
5	Georgia Southern	11
3	South Alabama	4
7	Arkansas State	2

Final; ESPN3
5	Georgia Southern	6^{10}
3	South Alabama	7
