= 2017 Troy Trojans baseball team =

American college baseball season

2017 Troy Trojans baseball
- Conference: Sun Belt Conference
- East Division
- Record: 31–25 (16–14 SBC)
- Head coach: Mark Smartt (2nd season)
- Home stadium: Riddle–Pace Field

2017 Sun Belt Conference baseball standings
	Conf.						Overall
Team	W		L		T	PCT	W		L		T	PCT
East Division
Coastal Carolina^{x}^{†} ‍‍‍	22	–	7	–	1	.750	37	–	19	–	1	.658
No. 26 South Alabama^{‡}^{y} ‍‍‍	22	–	8	–	0	.733	40	–	21	–	0	.656
Georgia Southern ‍‍‍	18	–	12	–	0	.600	38	–	21	–	0	.644
Troy ‍‍‍	16	–	14	–	0	.533	31	–	25	–	0	.554
Georgia State ‍‍‍	10	–	20	–	0	.333	22	–	33	–	0	.400
Appalachian State ‍‍‍	8	–	22	–	0	.267	19	–	36	–	0	.345
West Division
UT Arlington^{x} ‍‍‍	20	–	10	–	0	.667	30	–	25	–	0	.545
Louisiana–Lafayette ‍‍‍	19	–	10	–	1	.650	35	–	21	–	1	.623
Arkansas State ‍‍‍	13	–	16	–	0	.448	28	–	27	–	0	.509
Texas State ‍‍‍	13	–	17	–	0	.433	29	–	30	–	0	.492
Little Rock ‍‍‍	11	–	18	–	0	.379	21	–	34	–	0	.382
Louisiana–Monroe ‍‍‍	6	–	24	–	0	.200	12	–	43	–	0	.218
x – Division champion † – Conference champion ‡ – Tournament champion y – Invited to the NCAA tournament Rankings from Collegiate Baseball

The 2017 Troy Trojans baseball team represented the Troy University in the 2017 NCAA Division I baseball season. The Trojans played their home games at Riddle–Pace Field.

== Schedule and results ==
Troy announced its 2017 football schedule on October 27, 2016. The 2017 schedule consisted of 28 home and 28 away games in the regular season. The Trojans hosted Sun Belts foes Appalachian State, Georgia Southern, Louisiana–Lafayette, Louisiana–Monroe, and Texas State and will travel to Coastal Carolina, Georgia State, Little Rock, South Alabama, and Texas–Arlington.

The 2017 Sun Belt Conference Championship was contested May 24–28 in Statesboro, Georgia, and was hosted by Georgia Southern.

Troy finished 4th in the east division of the conference which qualified the Trojans to compete in the tournament as the 6th seed seeking for the team's 4th Sun Belt Conference tournament title.

2017 Troy baseball game log
Regular season (31–24)

February (5–3)
Date	Opponent	Rank	Site	Score	Attendance	Overall record	SBC record
Feb. 17	Xavier		Riddle–Pace Field • Troy, AL	L 6–2	1,821	0–1	–
Feb. 18	Xavier		Riddle–Pace Field • Troy, AL	W 2–1	733	1–1	–
Feb. 18	Xavier		Riddle–Pace Field • Troy, AL	L 2–8	802	1–2	–
Feb. 19	Xavier		Riddle–Pace Field • Troy, AL	W 5–2	894	2–2	–
Feb. 24	at New Orleans		Maestri Field • New Orleans, LA	W 12–9	172	3–2	–
Feb. 25	at New Orleans		Maestri Field • New Orleans, LA	L 3–2	325	3–3	–
Feb. 26	at New Orleans		Maestri Field • New Orleans, LA	W 4–3	237	4–3	–
Feb. 28	at UAB		Jerry D. Young Memorial Field • Birmingham, AL	W 4–2	198	5–3	–

March (8–9)
Date	Opponent	Rank	Site	Score	Attendance	Overall record	SBC record
Mar. 3	vs. Seton Hall		Blue Wahoos Stadium • Pensacola, FL	W 6–3	1,321	6–3	–
Mar. 4	vs. South Alabama		Blue Wahoos Stadium • Pensacola, FL	L 6–4	1,947	6–4	–
Mar. 5	vs. Southeastern Louisiana		Blue Wahoos Stadium • Pensacola, FL	L 5–4	704	6–5	–
Mar. 10	Hofstra		Riddle–Pace Field • Troy, AL	W 4–0	792	7–5	–
Mar. 11	Hofstra		Riddle–Pace Field • Troy, AL	L 9–5	964	7–6	–
Mar. 11	Hofstra		Riddle–Pace Field • Troy, AL	W 7–1	1,002	8–6	–
Mar. 12	Hofstra		Riddle–Pace Field • Troy, AL	W 16–7	678	9–6	–
Mar. 17	at Little Rock		Gary Hogan Field • Little Rock, AR	W 7–6	227	10–6	1–0
Mar. 18	at Little Rock		Gary Hogan Field • Little Rock, AR	W 6–3	275	11–6	2–0
Mar. 19	at Little Rock		Gary Hogan Field • Little Rock, AR	L 10–3	261	11–7	2–1
Mar. 21	Samford		Riddle–Pace Field • Troy, AL	W 9–2	1,298	12–7	–
Mar. 22	at Samford		Joe Lee Griffin Stadium • Birmingham, AL	L 4–3	463	12–8	–
Mar. 24	Louisiana–Lafayette		Riddle–Pace Field • Troy, AL	L 6–5	1,745	12–9	2–2
Mar. 25	Louisiana–Lafayette		Riddle–Pace Field • Troy, AL	W 7–5	1,771	13–9	3–2
Mar. 26	Louisiana–Lafayette		Riddle–Pace Field • Troy, AL	L 7–2	878	13–10	3–3
Mar. 31	at Texas–Arlington		Clay Gould Ballpark • Arlington, TX	L 9–6	516	13–11	3–4
Mar. 31	at Texas–Arlington		Clay Gould Ballpark • Arlington, TX	L 5–2	516	13–12	3–5

April (11–7)
Date	Opponent	Rank	Site	Score	Attendance	Overall record	SBC record
April 1	at Texas–Arlington		Clay Gould Ballpark • Arlington, TX	W 13–5	302	14–12	4–5
April 4	Alabama		Riddle–Pace Field • Troy, AL	W 12–11	3,328	15–12	–
April 7	Georgia Southern		Riddle–Pace Field • Troy, AL	L 5–3	1,001	15–13	4–6
April 8	Georgia Southern		Riddle–Pace Field • Troy, AL	L 6–3	1,421	15–14	4–7
April 9	Georgia Southern		Riddle–Pace Field • Troy, AL	W 4–0	812	16–14	5–7
April 11	at Alabama State		Wheeler–Watkins Baseball Complex • Montgomery, AL	W 6–4	291	17–14	–
April 13	at Georgia State		Georgia State Baseball Complex • Atlanta, GA	L 9–3	276	17–15	5-8
April 14	at Georgia State		Georgia State Baseball Complex • Atlanta, GA	L 3–2	291	17–16	5–9
April 15	at Georgia State		Georgia State Baseball Complex • Atlanta, GA	W 5–3	321	18–16	6–9
April 18	UAB		Riddle–Pace Field • Troy, AL	L 6–1	768	18–17	–
April 19	at Jacksonville State		Rudy Abbott Field • Jacksonville, AL	W 10–5	312	19–17	-
April 21	Texas State		Riddle–Pace Field • Troy, AL	W 4–0	712	20–17	7-9
April 22	Texas State		Riddle–Pace Field • Troy, AL	W 4–3	792	21–17	8-9
April 23	Texas State		Riddle–Pace Field • Troy, AL	W 6–3	992	22–17	9-9
April 25	at #8 Auburn		Plainsman Park • Auburn, AL	W 5–2	2,872	23–17	-
April 28	at Coastal Carolina		Springs Brooks Stadium • Conway, SC	W 4–0	1,492	24–17	10-9
April 29	at Coastal Carolina		Springs Brooks Stadium • Conway, SC	L 5–4	1,470	24–18	10-10
April 30	at Coastal Carolina		Springs Brooks Stadium • Conway, SC	L 11–8	1,616	24–19	10-11

May (7–5)
Date	Opponent	Rank	Site	Score	Attendance	Overall record	SBC record
May 3	Jacksonville State		Riddle–Pace Field • Troy, AL	L 4–3	1,429	24–20	-
May 5	Appalachian State		Riddle–Pace Field • Troy, AL	W 9–1	728	25–20	11–11
May 6	Appalachian State		Riddle–Pace Field • Troy, AL	L 12–2	1,111	25–21	11–12
May 7	Appalachian State		Riddle–Pace Field • Troy, AL	W 11–3	1,075	26–21	12–12
May 10	Alabama State		Riddle–Pace Field • Troy, AL	W 4–3	892	27–21	–
May 12	Louisiana–Monroe		Riddle–Pace Field • Troy, AL	W 9–1	789	28–21	13–12
May 13	Louisiana–Monroe		Riddle–Pace Field • Troy, AL	W 10–9	1,199	29–21	14–12
May 14	Louisiana–Monroe		Riddle–Pace Field • Troy, AL	W 8–3	1,101	30–21	15–12
May 16	#9 Mississippi State		Dudy Noble Field • Starkville, MS	L 10–8	6,223	30–22	–
May 18	#25 South Alabama		Eddie Stanky Field • Mobile, AL	W 5–4	1,515	31–22	16–12
May 19	#25 South Alabama		Eddie Stanky Field • Mobile, AL	L 10–6	1,602	31–23	16–13
May 20	#25 South Alabama		Eddie Stanky Field • Mobile, AL	L 10–7	1,389	31–24	16–14

Postseason (0–1)

SBC Tournament (0–1)
Date	Opponent	Rank	Site	Score	Attendance	Overall record	SBCT Record
May 26	vs. South Alabama		J. I. Clements Stadium • Statesboro, GA	L 9–1	153	31–25	0–1

- Rankings are based on the team's current ranking in the Collegiate Baseball poll.
