= Gary Hogan Field =

Baseball venue in Little Rock, Arkansas, United States

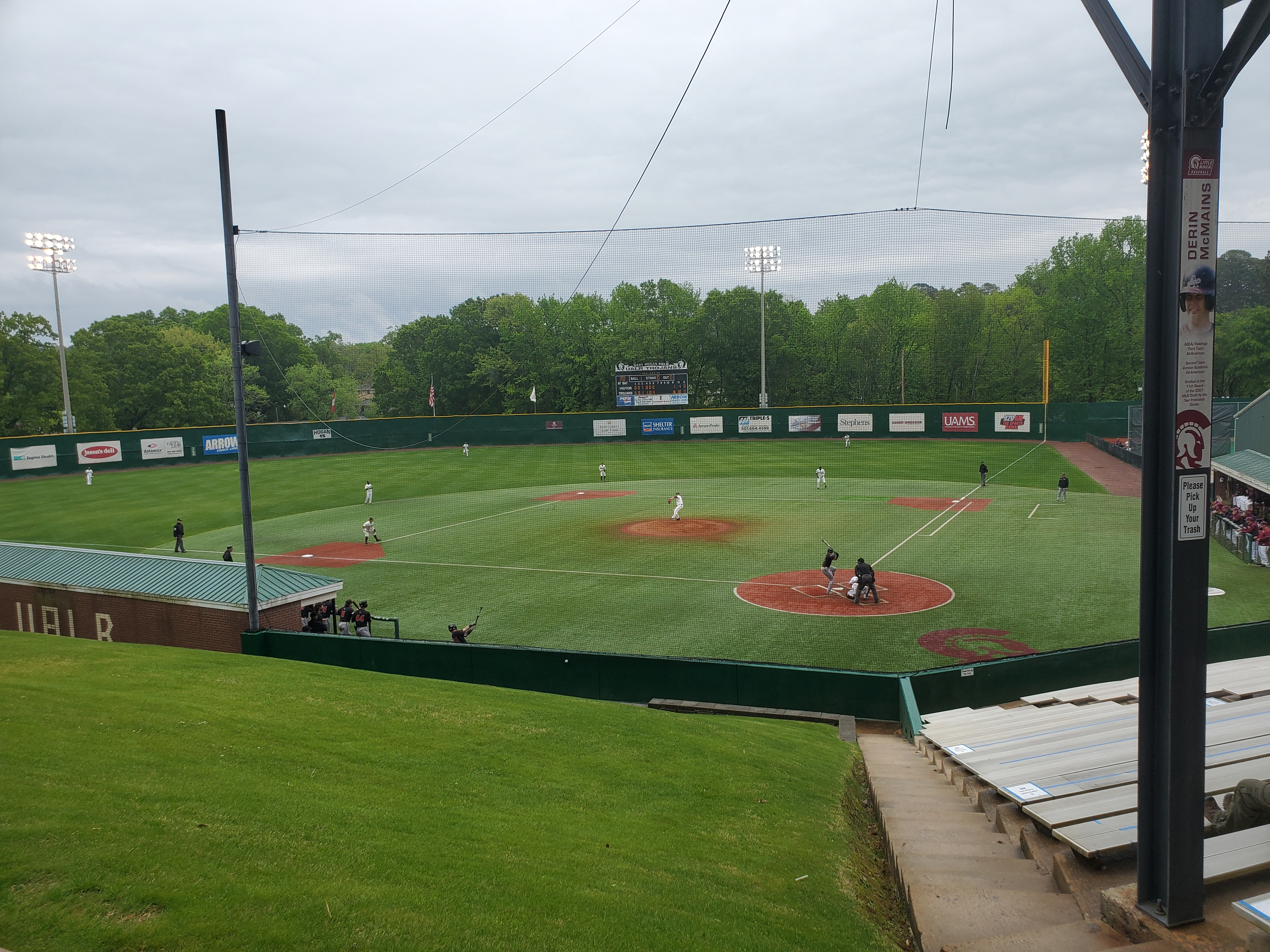
- Interactive map of Gary Hogan Field
- Former names: Curran Conway Field
- Location: 2501 South Harrison Street, Little Rock, Arkansas, U.S.
- Coordinates: 34.729062°N 92.330432°W
- Owner: University of Arkansas at Little Rock
- Capacity: 2,550 (550 seated)
- Surface: Polyurethane turf (Infield), Natural grass (outfield)
- Scoreboard: Yes

Construction
- Renovated: 1986, 1988, 1998, 2001, 2003, 2005, 2012
- Expanded: 2004

Tenants
- Little Rock Trojans (NCAA) (1978–present); Arkansas Baptist College Buffaloes (NJCAA) (2009–present)

Gary Hogan Field is a baseball venue located in Little Rock, Arkansas, United States. It has been home to the Little Rock Trojans college baseball team of the Division I United Athletic Conference since 1978 and also the home of the Arkansas Baptist College Buffaloes junior college baseball team of Region 2 of the National Junior College Athletic Association. Formerly known as Curran Conway Field, the venue has a capacity of 2,550.

== History ==
When the Trojans began using the facility in 1978, the field was in poor condition. This forced the program to play home games at other fields in Little Rock during the early 1980s.

When Coach Gary Hogan arrived in 1986, he described Curran Conway Field as "a rock pit and dust bowl." Hogan secured donations from both alumni and the surrounding community to make numerous improvements to the field, making it playable for a Division I team.

== Name ==
The field is named for former Little Rock baseball coach Gary Hogan. Hogan coached for 11 season from 1986 to 1996, recording 276 victories in that span. His career victories mark stands as a record for UALR baseball coaches.

== Renovations and features ==
Following Coach Hogan's arrival in 1986, the field underwent many renovations. Hogan, after securing $500,000 of donations, installed a turf infield, natural grass outfield, outfield wall, dugouts, and indoor practice facility over the course of his 11-year tenure.

In 1998, a new turf infield, warning track, and outfield drainage system were installed at Conway Field.

In 2001, the Kris Wheeler Complex was constructed. Named after a Trojans outfielder who played from 1998 to 2002, the facility included a press box, concession stands, and a new gated entrance.

In 2003, a new scoreboard was installed, located over the right field fence.

Prior to the 2004 season, the UALR athletic department announced an anonymous $1.6 million donation for improvements to the baseball field. At the same time, it was announced that the field would be renamed Gary Hogan Field, in honor of the former Trojan baseball coach. Numerous improvements followed in the subsequent years. A new AstroTurf infield, lighting system, sound system, and indoor workout facility were constructed. Also, chairbacks were installed in 200 of the 550 seats located behind home plate.

In 2011, the infield's AstroTurf surface was replaced with polyurethane turf. A Trojan logo was added behind home plate, and the surface of the warning track was changed from clay to turf.

== See also ==
- List of NCAA Division I baseball venues
