= Tomlinson Stadium–Slayton Family Field =

Baseball Stadium

- Slayton Family Field
- Interactive map of Tomlinson Stadium–Slayton Family Field
- Full name: J.A. "Ike" Tomlinson Stadium–Slayton Family Field
- Location: 208 Olympic Drive, Jonesboro, Arkansas, USA
- Coordinates: 35.842523°N 90.668492°W
- Owner: Arkansas State University
- Operator: Arkansas State University
- Capacity: 1,200
- Surface: Artificial turf
- Scoreboard: Electronic
- Record attendance: 2,112 4/11/26 vs Coastal Carolina
- Field size: 335 ft. (LF, RF), 370 ft. (LCF, RCF), 400 ft. (CF)

Construction
- Built: 1992
- Opened: January 1, 1993
- Renovated: 1996, 2003, 2007, 2008, 2025

Tenant
- Arkansas State Red Wolves baseball (1993–present)

Tomlinson Stadium–Slayton Family Field is a baseball venue located in Jonesboro, Arkansas, United States. It has been home to the Arkansas State Red Wolves college baseball team of the Division I Sun Belt Conference since 1993. The venue has a capacity of 1,200 people.

The stadium is named after former Arkansas State baseball coach and athletic director J.A. "Ike" Tomlinson, who coached ASU baseball from 1944–1976. His tenure set a record for longest-serving athletic coach in Arkansas State history which still stands today. The field was previously named after brothers George and Skeeter Kell, both of whom played baseball at Arkansas State and went on to play in the Major Leagues.

In 1996, lights were added at the facility, allowing night games to be played there for the first time. In 2003, a new batter's eye was constructed past the center field fence. A deck and picnic area, Barton's Baseball Deck, was added in 2007. In 2008, new chairback and handicap seats were added behind home plate, moving the backstop closer to the field.

A record 1,229 people attended Arkansas State's February 28, 2026, game against the Arkansas–Pine Bluff Golden Lions. Arkansas State defeated the Golden Lions 10–0 in 7 innings via the run rule.

== See also ==
- List of NCAA Division I baseball venues
