= 2009 Louisiana–Lafayette Ragin' Cajuns baseball team =

American college baseball season

2009 Louisiana–Lafayette Ragin' Cajuns baseball
- Conference: Sun Belt Conference
- Record: 27–30–1 (14–15 SBC)
- Head coach: Tony Robichaux (15th season)
- Assistant coaches: Anthony Babineaux; Michael Trahan
- Home stadium: M. L. Tigue Moore Field

2009 Sun Belt Conference baseball standings
	Conf.						Overall
Team	W		L		PCT		W	L		PCT
Middle Tennessee ‍†‍‡‍^{y}	21	–	8	–	0	.724		44	–	18	–	0	.710
No. 23 Western Kentucky ‍‍‍^{y}	21	–	8	–	0	.724		42	–	20	–	0	.677
Troy ‍‍‍	18	–	10	–	0	.643		33	–	21	–	0	.611
FIU ‍‍‍	18	–	12	–	0	.600		34	–	23	–	0	.596
Louisiana–Lafayette ‍‍‍	14	–	15	–	0	.483		27	–	30	–	1	.474
South Alabama ‍‍‍	13	–	16	–	0	.448		25	–	30	–	0	.455
Louisiana–Monroe ‍‍‍	12	–	17	–	0	.414		32	–	27	–	0	.542
Florida Atlantic ‍‍‍	12	–	17	–	0	.414		30	–	26	–	0	.536
Arkansas State ‍‍‍	12	–	18	–	0	.400		23	–	30	–	0	.434
New Orleans ‍‍‍	12	–	18	–	0	.400		22	–	33	–	0	.400
Arkansas–Little Rock ‍‍‍	7	–	21	–	0	.250		16	–	34	–	0	.320
† – Conference champion ‡ – Tournament champion y – Invited to the NCAA tournament As of June 30, 2009; Rankings from Collegiate Baseball

The 2009 Louisiana–Lafayette Ragin' Cajuns baseball team represented the University of Louisiana at Lafayette in the 2009 NCAA Division I baseball season. The Ragin' Cajuns played their home games at M. L. Tigue Moore Field and were led by fifteenth year head coach Tony Robichaux.

== Roster ==
2009 Louisiana–Lafayette Ragin' Cajuns roster
Pitchers: 4 Patrick Holloway – Redshirt Freshman; 5 Randall Bulliard – Sophomore; 8 Luke Wagley – Senior; 10 Matt Lackie – Redshirt Freshman; 15 Justin Robichaux – Junior; 19 Gregory Harmon – Senior; 20 Matt Broussard – Senior; 21 Dayton Marze – Redshirt Freshman; 23 Michael Cook – Sophomore; 26 Corey Chapman – Senior; 27 Greg Wilborn – Junior; 28 Taylor Hubbell – Junior; 29 Alex Fuselier – Redshirt Freshman; 30 Blake Wascom – Redshirt Freshman; 32 Zach Osborne – Junior; 33 Blake Haagen – Senior; 35 Garrett Larsen – Junior; 38 Blaire Goulas – Redshirt Freshman; 43 Ben Suit – Redshirt Freshman; 45 Ethan Hebert – Redshirt Freshman; 46 Jordan Landry – Redshirt Freshman	Catchers: 6 Dillon Guillory – Sophomore; 11 Scott Hawkins – Senior; 17 Thad Griffen – Sophomore; Infielders: 1 Greg Fontenot – Sophomore; 2 Matt Hicks – Senior; 7 William Long – Junior; 9 Jordan Poirrier – Junior; 12 Tyler Benzel – Sophomore; 14 Tyler Frederick – Redshirt Freshman; 14 Jim Simon – Redshirt Freshman; 18 Kyle Bostick – Junior; 34 Chad Keefer – Junior; 40 Chance Harst – Junior; 42 Jon Masch – Junior; Outfielders: 13 Travis Whipple – Sophomore; 22 Les Smith – Redshirt Freshman; 24 Matt Goulas – Sophomore; 25 Brian Bowman – Sophomore; 31 Kyle Olasin – Junior; 39 Kolin Hatfield – Senior; 44 Alex Spikes – Sophomore

=== Coaching staff ===
2009 Louisiana–Lafayette Ragin' Cajuns coaching staff
- Tony Robichaux – Head coach – 15th year
- Anthony Babineaux – Associate head coach – 15th year
- Michael Trahan – Assistant Head Coach – 2nd year
- Chris Domingue – Director of Baseball Operations – 7th year

== Schedule and results ==
Legend
	Louisiana–Lafayette win
	Louisiana–Lafayette loss
	Postponement
**Bold**	Louisiana-Lafayette team member

2009 Louisiana–Lafayette Ragin' Cajuns baseball game log
Regular season (25–28–1)

February (1–5–1)
Date	Opponent	Site/stadium	Score	TV	Overall record	SBC record
Feb. 20	Nebraska	M. L. Tigue Moore Field • Lafayette, LA	**L** 3–4		0–1	
Feb. 21	Nebraska	M. L. Tigue Moore Field • Lafayette, LA	**W** 2–1		1–1	
Feb. 21	Nebraska	M. L. Tigue Moore Field • Lafayette, LA	**L** 8–9		1–2	
Feb. 22	Nebraska	M. L. Tigue Moore Field • Lafayette, LA	**T** 5–5		1–2–1	
Feb. 24	at Louisiana Tech	J. C. Love Field at Pat Patterson Park • Ruston, LA	Game cancelled			
Feb. 25	Southeastern Louisiana	M. L. Tigue Moore Field • Lafayette, LA	**L** 7–9		1–3–1	
Feb. 27	at Southern Miss	Pete Taylor Park • Hattiesburg, MS	**L** 1–10		1–4–1	
Feb. 28	at Southern Miss	Pete Taylor Park • Hattiesburg, MS	**L** 6–13		1–5–1	

March (10–7)
Date	Opponent	Site/stadium	Score	TV	Overall record	SBC record
Mar. 1	at Southern Miss	Pete Taylor Park • Hattiesburg, MS	**W** 7–5		2–4–1	
Mar. 3	Houston	M. L. Tigue Moore Field • Lafayette, LA	**W** 6–1		3–4–1	
Mar. 4	Texas Southern	M. L. Tigue Moore Field • Lafayette, LA	**W** 13–0		4–4–1	
Mar. 6	at Arkansas State	Tomlinson Stadium–Kell Field • Jonesboro, AR	**L** 0–2		4–5–1	0–1
Mar. 7	at Arkansas State	Tomlinson Stadium–Kell Field • Jonesboro, AR	**W** 3–2		5–5–1	1–1
Mar. 8	at Arkansas State	Tomlinson Stadium–Kell Field • Jonesboro, AR	**L** 2–3		5–6–1	1–2
Mar. 11	at No. 3 LSU	Alex Box Stadium, Skip Bertman Field • Baton Rouge, LA	**W** 10–9		6–6–1	
Mar. 13	Florida Atlantic	M. L. Tigue Moore Field • Lafayette, LA	Game cancelled			
Mar. 14	Florida Atlantic	M. L. Tigue Moore Field • Lafayette, LA	Game cancelled			
Mar. 15	Florida Atlantic	M. L. Tigue Moore Field • Lafayette, LA	**L** 5–6		6–7–1	1–3
Mar. 15	Florida Atlantic	M. L. Tigue Moore Field • Lafayette, LA	**L** 3–8		6–8–1	1–4
Mar. 17	at McNeese State	Joe Miller Ballpark • Lake Charles, LA	**W** 10–2		7–8–1	
Mar. 18	Louisiana Tech	M. L. Tigue Moore Field • Lafayette, LA	Game cancelled			
Mar. 20	Arkansas–Little Rock	M. L. Tigue Moore Field • Lafayette, LA	**W** 11–1		8–8–1	2–4
Mar. 21	Arkansas–Little Rock	M. L. Tigue Moore Field • Lafayette, LA	**W** 13–5		9–8–1	3–4
Mar. 22	Arkansas–Little Rock	M. L. Tigue Moore Field • Lafayette, LA	**W** 16–6		10–8–1	4–4
Mar. 24	at Houston	Cougar Field • Houston, TX	**L** 4–6		10–9–1	
Mar. 27	at FIU	University Park Stadium • Miami, FL	**L** 10–11		10–10–1	4–5
Mar. 28	at FIU	University Park Stadium • Miami, FL	**L** 7–11		10–11–1	4–6
Mar. 29	at FIU	University Park Stadium • Miami, FL	**W** 11–4		11–12–1	5–6

April (10–10)
Date	Opponent	Site/stadium	Score	TV	Overall record	SBC record
Apr. 1	Northwestern State	M. L. Tigue Moore Field • Lafayette, LA	**W** 11–5		12–12–1	
Apr. 3	Middle Tennessee	M. L. Tigue Moore Field • Lafayette, LA	**W** 5–2		13–12–1	6–6
Apr. 4	Middle Tennessee	M. L. Tigue Moore Field • Lafayette, LA	**W** 10–5		14–12–1	7–6
Apr. 5	Middle Tennessee	M. L. Tigue Moore Field • Lafayette, LA	**W** 14–7		15–12–1	8–6
Apr. 7	at Tulane	Greer Field at Turchin Stadium • New Orleans, LA	**W** 6–3		16–12–1	
Apr. 8	Southern	M. L. Tigue Moore Field • Lafayette, LA	**W** 4–1		17–12–1	
Apr. 10	at Louisiana–Monroe	Warhawk Field • Monroe, LA	**L** 7–16		17–13–1	8–7
Apr. 11	at Louisiana–Monroe	Warhawk Field • Monroe, LA	**L** 7–8		17–14–1	8–8
Apr. 11	at Louisiana–Monroe	Warhawk Field • Monroe, LA	**L** 4–7		17–15–1	8–9
Apr. 14	Stephen F. Austin	M. L. Tigue Moore Field • Lafayette, LA	**W** 8–7		18–15–1	
Apr. 15	at Southeastern Louisiana	Pat Kenelly Diamond at Alumni Field • Hammond, LA	**L** 2–9		18–16–1	
Apr. 17	South Alabama	M. L. Tigue Moore Field • Lafayette, LA	**L** 5–9		18–17–1	8–10
Apr. 18	South Alabama	M. L. Tigue Moore Field • Lafayette, LA	**L** 6–8		18–18–1	8–11
Apr. 19	South Alabama	M. L. Tigue Moore Field • Lafayette, LA	**L** 4–7		18–19–1	8–12
Apr. 22	vs. No. 9 LSU	Zephyr Field • Metairie, LA	**L** 6–10		18–20–1	
Apr. 24	at Troy	Riddle–Pace Field • Troy, AL	**W** 5–0		19–20–1	9–12
Apr. 25	at Troy	Riddle–Pace Field • Troy, AL	**W** 6–2		20–20–1	10–12
Apr. 26	at Troy	Riddle–Pace Field • Troy, AL	**L** 3–12		20–21–1	10–13
Apr. 28	McNeese State	M. L. Tigue Moore Field • Lafayette, LA	**W** 4–1		21–21–1	
Apr. 29	at Northwestern State	H. Alvin Brown–C. C. Stroud Field • Natchitoches, LA	**L** 5–7		21–22–1	

May (4–6)
Date	Opponent	Site/stadium	Score	TV	Overall record	SBC record
May 1	at No. 30 East Carolina	Clark–LeClair Stadium • Greenville, NC	**L** 1–7		21–23–1	
May 2	at No. 30 East Carolina	Clark–LeClair Stadium • Greenville, NC	**L** 1–3		21–24–1	
May 3	at No. 30 East Carolina	Clark–LeClair Stadium • Greenville, NC	**L** 4–9		21–25–1	
May 8	Western Kentucky	M. L. Tigue Moore Field • Lafayette, LA	**L** 3–6		21–26–1	10–14
May 9	Western Kentucky	M. L. Tigue Moore Field • Lafayette, LA	**L** 2–4		21–27–1	10–15
May 10	Western Kentucky	M. L. Tigue Moore Field • Lafayette, LA	**W** 6–5		22–27–1	11–15
May 12	at No. 9 Rice	Reckling Park • Houston, TX	**L** 2–7		22–28–1	
May 14	at New Orleans	Maestri Field at Privateer Park • New Orleans, LA	**W** 10–4		23–28–1	12–15
May 15	at New Orleans	Maestri Field at Privateer Park • New Orleans, LA	**W** 12–5		24–28–1	13–15
May 16	at New Orleans	Maestri Field at Privateer Park • New Orleans, LA	**W** 18–2		25–28–1	14–15

Postseason (2–2)

SBC Tournament (2–2)
Date	Opponent	Site/stadium	Score	TV	Overall record	SBC record
May 20	vs. FIU	Riddle–Pace Field • Troy, AL	**W** 11–3		26–28–1	
May 21	vs. Middle Tennessee	Riddle–Pace Field • Troy, AL	**W** 5–4		27–28–1	
May 22	vs. Middle Tennessee	Riddle–Pace Field • Troy, AL	**L** 8–17		27–29–1	
May 23	vs. Middle Tennessee	Riddle–Pace Field • Troy, AL	**L** 2–6		27–30–1	

Schedule source:

- Rankings are based on the team's current ranking in the Collegiate Baseball poll.
