= 2012 Louisiana–Lafayette Ragin' Cajuns baseball team =

American college baseball season

2012 Louisiana–Lafayette Ragin' Cajuns baseball
- Conference: Sun Belt Conference
- Record: 23-30 (11-19 SBC)
- Head coach: Tony Robichaux (18th season)
- Assistant coaches: Anthony Babineaux; Matt Deggs
- Home stadium: M. L. Tigue Moore Field

2012 Sun Belt Conference baseball standings
	Conf.				Overall
Team	W		L	PCT	W		L	PCT
Florida Atlantic ‍†‍‍^{y}	19	–	8	.704	32	–	22	.593
Arkansas State ‍‍‍	19	–	9	.679	34	–	23	.596
FIU ‍‍‍	15	–	14	.517	31	–	26	.544
South Alabama ‍‍‍	15	–	15	.500	23	–	34	.404
Louisiana–Monroe ‍‍‡‍^{y}	15	–	15	.500	32	–	30	.516
Troy ‍‍‍	14	–	16	.467	28	–	30	.483
Middle Tennessee ‍‍‍	14	–	16	.467	31	–	28	.525
Western Kentucky ‍‍‍	13	–	17	.433	25	–	33	.431
Arkansas–Little Rock ‍‍‍	12	–	18	.400	26	–	28	.481
Louisiana–Lafayette ‍‍‍	11	–	19	.367	23	–	30	.434
† – Conference champion ‡ – Tournament champion y – Invited to the NCAA tournament As of June 30, 2012; Rankings from Collegiate Baseball

The 2012 Louisiana–Lafayette Ragin' Cajuns baseball team represented the University of Louisiana at Lafayette in the 2012 NCAA Division I baseball season. The Ragin' Cajuns played their home games at M. L. Tigue Moore Field and were led by eighteenth year head coach Tony Robichaux.

== Preseason ==
=== Preseason All-Sun Belt team ===
- Tyler Ray (TROY, SR, Pitcher)
- Justin Hageman (WKU, SO, Pitcher)
- Tanner Perkins (WKU, JR, Pitcher)
- Hugh Adams (FAU, SR, Pitcher)
- Mason McVay (FIU, RS-JR, Pitcher)
- Mike Albaladejo (FAU, SR, Catcher)
- Mike Martinez (FIU, SR, 1st Base)
- Caleb Clowers (ULM, SR, 2nd Base)
- Logan Kirkland (USA, SO, 2nd Base)
- Tyler Hannah (TROY, SR, Shortstop)
- Hank LaRue (MTSU, SO, 3rd Base)
- Pablo Bermudez (FIU, SR, Outfield)
- Justin Guidry (MTSU, SR, Outfield)
- Rudy Flores (FIU, JR, Designated Hitter)

== Roster ==
2012 Louisiana-Lafayette Ragin' Cajuns roster
Pitchers: 12 Austin Robichaux - Freshman; 14 Chase Traffica - Junior; 17 Jordan Nicholson - Senior; 18 Henri Faucheaux - Freshman; 21 Derek Howell - Junior; 24 Chris Griffitt - Junior; 27 Kyle Neely - Redshirt Freshman; 30 Ben Carter - Junior; 31 Caleb Kellogg - Sophomore; 33 Joe Zimmerman - Senior; 34 Ben Frith - Junior; 35 Ethan Hebert - Senior; 37 Kendall Mayer - Junior; 39 Colton Daigle - Redshirt Sophomore; 42 Jordan Harrison - Junior; Catchers: 11 Michael Strenz - Sophomore; 13 Chris Sinclair - Senior; 20 Adam Todd - Redshirt Sophomore	Infielders: 1 Cord Cockrell - Freshman; 6 Jordan Bourque - Senior; 7 Ryan Leonards - Sophomore; 8 Logan Preston - Freshman; 9 Tyler Girouard - Redshirt Freshman; 10 Tyler Frederick - Junior; 19 Jace Conrad - Freshman; 26 Matt Hicks - Sophomore; 29 Thomas Simoneaux - Redshirt Freshman; 32 Chase Compton - Sophomore; Outfielders: 2 Dominick Francia - Sophomore; 4 Daniel Nichols - Senior; 15 Dylan Butler - Freshman; 22 Nick Jones - Junior; 23 James Peterson - Freshman; 25 Brian Bowman - Senior; 28 Almann Snowden - Freshman

=== Coaching staff ===
2012 Louisiana-Lafayette Ragin' Cajuns coaching staff
- Tony Robichaux – Head Coach – 18th year
- Anthony Babineaux – Associate Head Coach – 18th year
- Matt Deggs – Assistant Head Coach – 1st year
- Chris Domingue – Director of Baseball Operations – 10th year

== Schedule and results ==
Legend
	Louisiana-Lafayette win
	Louisiana-Lafayette loss
	Postponement
**Bold**	Louisiana-Lafayette team member

2012 Louisiana–Lafayette Ragin' Cajuns baseball game log
Regular season (23-30)

February (5-3)
Date	Opponent	Site/stadium	Score	TV	Overall record	SBC record
Texas State Bobcat Classic
Feb. 18	vs. Wichita State	Bobcat Ballpark • San Marcos, TX	**W** 1-0		1-0	
Feb. 19	vs. Santa Clara	Bobcat Ballpark • San Marcos, TX	**L** 5-8		1-1	
Feb. 20	vs. Texas State	Bobcat Ballpark • San Marcos, TX	**L** 5-9		1-2	
Feb. 22	at Southeastern Louisiana	Pat Kenelly Diamond at Alumni Field • Hammond, LA	**L** 5-6		1-3	
Feb. 24	Towson	M. L. Tigue Moore Field • Lafayette, LA	**W** 6-5		2-3	
Feb. 25	Towson	M. L. Tigue Moore Field • Lafayette, LA	**W** 11-1		3–3	
Feb. 26	Towson	M. L. Tigue Moore Field • Lafayette, LA	**W** 6-2		4-3	
Feb. 28	Alcorn State	M. L. Tigue Moore Field • Lafayette, LA	**W** 6-4		5-3	

March (8-10)
Date	Opponent	Site/stadium	Score	TV	Overall record	SBC record
UTSA Classic
Mar. 2	vs. Gonzaga	Roadrunner Field • San Antonio, TX	**L** 1-6		5-4	
Mar. 3	vs. Kansas	Roadrunner Field • San Antonio, TX	**W** 8-6		6-4	
Mar. 4	vs. UTSA	Roadrunner Field • San Antonio, TX	**L** 2-5		6-5	
Mar. 6	Houston	M. L. Tigue Moore Field • Lafayette, LA	**W** 3-1		7-5	
Mar. 7	at McNeese State	Joe Miller Ballpark • Lake Charles, LA	**W** 14-8		8-5	
Mar. 9	Southern Miss	M. L. Tigue Moore Field • Lafayette, LA	**W** 12-5		9-5	
Mar. 10	Southern Miss	M. L. Tigue Moore Field • Lafayette, LA	**L** 3-4 (11 inn)		9-6	
Mar. 11	Southern Miss	M. L. Tigue Moore Field • Lafayette, LA	**L** 3-11		9-7	
Mar. 13	Southern	M. L. Tigue Moore Field • Lafayette, LA	**W** 6-5		10-7	
Mar. 16	at Louisiana-Monroe	Warhawk Field • Monroe, LA	**W** 5-0		11-7	1-0
Mar. 17	at Louisiana-Monroe	Warhawk Field • Monroe, LA	**W** 5-3 (10 inn)		12-7	2-0
Mar. 18	at Louisiana-Monroe	Warhawk Field • Monroe, LA	**L** 5-7		12-8	2-1
Mar. 20	Tulane	M. L. Tigue Moore Field • Lafayette, LA	Game postponed due to high winds and impending severe weather in Lafayette.			
Mar. 21	at Northwestern State	H. Alvin Brown–C. C. Stroud Field • Natchitoches, LA	Game canceled due to inclement weather in Natchitoches.			
Mar. 23	Arkansas State	M. L. Tigue Moore Field • Lafayette, LA	**W** 9-2		13-8	3-1
Mar. 24	Arkansas State	M. L. Tigue Moore Field • Lafayette, LA	**L** 4-6		13-9	3-2
Mar. 25	Arkansas State	M. L. Tigue Moore Field • Lafayette, LA	**L** 7-8		13-10	3-3
Mar. 28	at No. 13 LSU	Alex Box Stadium, Skip Bertman Field • Baton Rouge, LA	**L** 0-5		13-11	
Mar. 30	at Florida Atlantic	FAU Baseball Stadium • Boca Raton, FL	**L** 3-7		13-12	3-4
Mar. 31	at Florida Atlantic	FAU Baseball Stadium • Boca Raton, FL	**L** 2-5		13-13	3-5

April (7-10)
Date	Opponent	Site/stadium	Score	TV	Overall record	SBC record
Apr. 1	at Florida Atlantic	FAU Softball Stadium • Boca Raton, FL	**L** 3-8		13-14	3-6
Apr. 3	Southeastern Louisiana	M. L. Tigue Moore Field • Lafayette, LA	**L** 1-2		13-15	
Apr. 6	Western Kentucky	M. L. Tigue Moore Field • Lafayette, LA	**L** 2-6		13-16	3-7
Apr. 7	Western Kentucky	M. L. Tigue Moore Field • Lafayette, LA	**W** 1-0		14-16	4-7
Apr. 8	Western Kentucky	M. L. Tigue Moore Field • Lafayette, LA	**W** 2-1		15-16	5-7
Apr. 10	at Southern	Lee–Hines Field • Baton Rouge, LA	**L** 2-3		15-17	
Apr. 13	FIU	M. L. Tigue Moore Field • Lafayette, LA	**L** 1-2		15-18	5-8
Apr. 14	FIU	M. L. Tigue Moore Field • Lafayette, LA	**W** 5-4		16-18	6-7
Apr. 15	FIU	M. L. Tigue Moore Field • Lafayette, LA	**L** 1-2		16-19	6-8
Apr. 17	at Northwestern State	H. Alvin Brown–C. C. Stroud Field • Natchitoches, LA	Game canceled due to unplayable field conditions.			
Apr. 18	Northwestern State	M. L. Tigue Moore Field • Lafayette, LA	**W** 10-8		17-19	
Apr. 20	at South Alabama	Eddie Stanky Field • Mobile, AL	**L** 5-7		17-20	6-9
Apr. 21	at South Alabama	Eddie Stanky Field • Mobile, AL	**W** 6-1		18-20	7-9
Apr. 22	at South Alabama	Eddie Stanky Field • Mobile, AL	**L** 3-5		18-21	7-10
Apr. 25	McNeese State	M. L. Tigue Moore Field • Lafayette, LA	**W** 5-4		19-21	
Apr. 27	at Arkansas-Little Rock	Gary Hogan Field • Little Rock, AR	**L** 2-7		18-22	7-11
Apr. 28	at Arkansas–Little Rock	Gary Hogan Field • Little Rock, AR	**W** 7-6		19-22	8-11
Apr. 29	at Arkansas–Little Rock	Gary Hogan Field • Little Rock, AR	**L** 8-9		19-23	8-12

May (3-7)
Date	Opponent	Site/stadium	Score	TV	Overall record	SBC record
May 4	Troy	M. L. Tigue Moore Field • Lafayette, LA	**W** 9-8 (11 inn)		21-23	9-12
May 5	Troy	M. L. Tigue Moore Field • Lafayette, LA	**L** 1-8		21-24	9-13
May 6	Troy	M. L. Tigue Moore Field • Lafayette, LA	**L** 8-10		21-25	9-14
May 8	at Tulane	Greer Field at Turchin Stadium • New Orleans, LA	**L** 3-7		21-26	
May 11	at Middle Tennessee	Reese Smith Jr. Field • Murfreesboro, TN	**L** 2-4		21-27	9-15
May 12	at Middle Tennessee	Reese Smith Jr. Field • Murfreesboro, TN	**W** 10-4		22-27	10-15
May 12	at Middle Tennessee	Reese Smith Jr. Field • Murfreesboro, TN	**W** 14-0		23-27	11-15
May 15	at Houston	Cougar Field • Houston, TX	Game canceled due to inclement weather in Houston.			
May 17	Louisiana-Monroe	M. L. Tigue Moore Field • Lafayette, LA	**L** 2-8		23-28	11-16
May 18	Louisiana-Monroe	M. L. Tigue Moore Field • Lafayette, LA	**L** 1-2 (11 inn)		23-29	11-17
May 19	Louisiana-Monroe	M. L. Tigue Moore Field • Lafayette, LA	**L** 0-17		23-30	11-18

Schedule source:

- Rankings are based on the team's current ranking in the Collegiate Baseball poll.
