= 2010 Louisiana–Lafayette Ragin' Cajuns baseball team =

American college baseball season

2010 Louisiana–Lafayette Ragin' Cajuns baseball

Sun Belt Conference Regular season Co-champions Austin Regionals appearance
- Conference: Sun Belt Conference
- Record: 38–22 (21–9 SBC)
- Head coach: Tony Robichaux (16th season)
- Assistant coaches: Anthony Babineaux; Michael Trahan
- Home stadium: M. L. Tigue Moore Field

2010 Sun Belt Conference baseball standings
	Conf.				Overall
Team	W		L	PCT	W		L	PCT
Louisiana–Lafayette ‍†‍‍^{y}	21	–	9	.700	38	–	22	.633
Florida Atlantic ‍†‍‍^{y}	21	–	9	.700	37	–	24	.607
Middle Tennessee ‍‍‍	18	–	12	.600	35	–	23	.603
FIU ‍‍‡‍^{y}	17	–	13	.567	36	–	25	.590
South Alabama ‍‍‍	17	–	13	.567	32	–	27	.542
Western Kentucky ‍‍‍	16	–	14	.533	35	–	23	.603
Troy ‍‍‍	16	–	14	.533	36	–	25	.590
Arkansas State ‍‍‍	16	–	14	.533	30	–	28	.517
Arkansas–Little Rock ‍‍‍	12	–	16	.429	29	–	25	.537
Louisiana–Monroe ‍‍‍	7	–	23	.233	17	–	38	.309
New Orleans ‍‍‍	2	–	26	.071	13	–	39	.250
† – Conference champion ‡ – Tournament champion y – Invited to the NCAA tournament As of June 30, 2010; Rankings from Collegiate Baseball

The 2010 Louisiana–Lafayette Ragin' Cajuns baseball team represented the University of Louisiana at Lafayette in the 2010 NCAA Division I baseball season. The Ragin' Cajuns played their home games at M. L. Tigue Moore Field and were led by sixteenth year head coach Tony Robichaux.

== Roster ==
2010 Louisiana–Lafayette Ragin' Cajuns roster
Pitchers: 5 Randall Bulliard – Junior; 12 Ryland Parker – Junior; 14 Chase Traffica – Redshirt Freshman; 15 Justin Robichaux – Senior; 17 Jordan Nicholson – Sophomore; 20 Jordan Landry – Redshirt Freshman; 21 Dayton Marze – Sophomore; 23 Michael Cook – Junior; 26 Colton Daigle – Redshirt Freshman; 28 Taylor Hubbell – Junior; 29 Alex Fuselier – Sophomore; 30 Blake Wascom – Sophomore; 32 Zach Osborne – Senior; 33 Dustin Ardoin – Junior; 35 Garrett Larsen – Junior; 37 Joey Satriano – Junior; 38 Manning Duhon – Redshirt Freshman; 38 Blaire Goulas – Sophomore; 38 Ben Suit – Redshirt Freshman; 39 Michael Faul – Junior; 40 T. J. Geith – Junior; 42 Josh Bailey – Senior; 43 Ethan Hebert – Sophomore; 45 Jacob Duhon – Redshirt Freshman	Catchers: 6 Dillon Guillory – Junior; 22 Thad Griffen – Junior; 27 Adam Todd – Redshirt Freshman; Infielders: 1 Greg Fontenot – Junior; 7 William Long – Senior; 8 Trask Switzenberg – Junior; 9 Jordan Poirrier – Junior; 10 Tyler Frederick – Redshirt Freshman; 13 Jon Masch – Senior; 14 Jim Simon – Redshirt Freshman; 18 Kyle Bostick – Senior; 34 Chad Keefer – Senior; 40 Chance Harst – Senior; Outfielders: 4 Daniel Nichols – Junior; 19 Lance Marvel – Junior; 20 Alex Spikes – Junior; 24 Matt Goulas – Junior; 25 Brian Bowman – Sophomore; 31 Kyle Olasin – Senior

=== Coaching staff ===
2010 Louisiana–Lafayette Ragin' Cajuns coaching staff
- Tony Robichaux – Head coach – 16th year
- Anthony Babineaux – Associate head coach – 16th year
- Michael Trahan – Assistant Head Coach – 3rd year
- Chris Domingue – Director of Baseball Operations – 8th year

== Schedule and results ==
Legend
	Louisiana–Lafayette win
	Louisiana–Lafayette loss
	Postponement
**Bold**	Louisiana-Lafayette team member

2010 Louisiana–Lafayette Ragin' Cajuns baseball game log
Regular season (37–18)

February (5–1)
Date	Opponent	Site/stadium	Score	TV	Overall record	SBC record
Feb. 19	Nicholls State	M. L. Tigue Moore Field • Lafayette, LA	**W** 6–2		1–0	
Feb. 20	Nicholls State	M. L. Tigue Moore Field • Lafayette, LA	**W** 6–2		2–0	
Feb. 21	at Nicholls State	Ray E. Didier Field • Thibodaux, LA	**W** 10–1		3–0	
Feb. 27	Miami (OH)	M. L. Tigue Moore Field • Lafayette, LA	**L** 5–7		3–1	
Feb. 27	Miami (OH)	M. L. Tigue Moore Field • Lafayette, LA	**W** 13–2		4–1	
Feb. 28	Miami (OH)	M. L. Tigue Moore Field • Lafayette, LA	**W** 5–4		5–1	

March (8–11)
Date	Opponent	Site/stadium	Score	TV	Overall record	SBC record
Mar. 3	at No. 29 Southeastern Louisiana	Pay Kenelly Diamond at Alumni Field • Hammond, LA	**L** 4–11		5–2	
Mar. 5	Southern Miss	M. L. Tigue Moore Field • Lafayette, LA	**L** 0–4		5–3	
Mar. 6	Southern Miss	M. L. Tigue Moore Field • Lafayette, LA	**L** 1–6		5–4	
Mar. 7	Southern Miss	M. L. Tigue Moore Field • Lafayette, LA	**W** 10–6		6–4	
Mar. 9	Alcorn State	M. L. Tigue Moore Field • Lafayette, LA	**W** 18–1		7–4	
Mar. 10	Alcorn State	M. L. Tigue Moore Field • Lafayette, LA	**W** 11–0		8–4	
Mar. 12	Arkansas State	M. L. Tigue Moore Field • Lafayette, LA	**W** 13–5		9–4	1–0
Mar. 13	Arkansas State	M. L. Tigue Moore Field • Lafayette, LA	**L** 2–6		9–5	1–1
Mar. 14	Arkansas State	M. L. Tigue Moore Field • Lafayette, LA	**L** 9–13		9–6	1–2
Mar. 16	Southern	M. L. Tigue Moore Field • Lafayette, LA	**W** 13–2		10–6	
Mar. 17	No. 17 Southeastern Louisiana	M. L. Tigue Moore Field • Lafayette, LA	**L** 4–9		10–7	
Mar. 19	at South Alabama	Eddie Stanky Field • Mobile, AL	**W** 3–1		11–7	2–2
Mar. 20	at South Alabama	Eddie Stanky Field • Mobile, AL	**L** 4–9		11–8	2–3
Mar. 21	at South Alabama	Eddie Stanky Field • Mobile, AL	**L** 11–12		11–9	2–4
Mar. 24	at No. 4 LSU	Alex Box Stadium • Baton Rouge, LA	**L** 3–4		11–10	
Mar. 26	Florida Atlantic	M. L. Tigue Moore Field • Lafayette, LA	**W** 9–3		12–10	3–4
Mar. 27	Florida Atlantic	M. L. Tigue Moore Field • Lafayette, LA	**L** 3–4		12–11	3–5
Mar. 28	Florida Atlantic	M. L. Tigue Moore Field • Lafayette, LA	**L** 3–4		12–12	3–6
Mar. 30	Northwestern State	M. L. Tigue Moore Field • Lafayette, LA	**W** 8–1		13–12	

April (13–4)
Date	Opponent	Site/stadium	Score	TV	Overall record	SBC record
Apr. 2	at FIU	FIU Baseball Stadium • Miami, FL	**L** 1–8		13–13	3–7
Apr. 3	at FIU	FIU Baseball Stadium • Miami, FL	**W** 7–3		14–13	4–7
Apr. 4	at FIU	FIU Baseball Stadium • Miami, FL	**L** 6–15		14–14	4–8
Apr. 6	at Northwestern State	H. Alvin Brown–C. C. Stroud Field • Natchitoches, LA	**W** 4–3		15–14	
Apr. 9	Troy	M. L. Tigue Moore Field • Lafayette, LA	**W** 6–0		16–14	5–8
Apr. 10	Troy	M. L. Tigue Moore Field • Lafayette, LA	**W** 9–5		17–14	6–8
Apr. 11	Troy	M. L. Tigue Moore Field • Lafayette, LA	**W** 8–5		18–14	7–8
Apr. 13	Houston Baptist	M. L. Tigue Moore Field • Lafayette, LA	**W** 5–3		19–14	
Apr. 16	at Arkansas–Little Rock	Gary Hogan Field • Little Rock, AR	**W** 4–3		20–14	8–8
Apr. 17	at Arkansas–Little Rock	Gary Hogan Field • Little Rock, AR	**W** 9–3		21–14	9–8
Apr. 18	at Arkansas–Little Rock	Gary Hogan Field • Little Rock, AR	**W** 13–7		22–14	10–8
Apr. 20	McNeese State	M. L. Tigue Moore Field • Lafayette, LA	**W** 5–2		23–14	11–8
Apr. 23	Le Moyne College	M. L. Tigue Moore Field • Lafayette, LA	**W** 13–2		24–14	
Apr. 24	Le Moyne College	M. L. Tigue Moore Field • Lafayette, LA	**L** 5–6		24–15	
Apr. 25	Le Moyne College	M. L. Tigue Moore Field • Lafayette, LA	**W** 8–5		25–15	
Apr. 27	at Tulane	Greer Field at Turchin Stadium • New Orleans, LA	**L** 1–2		25–16	
Apr. 30	Middle Tennessee	M. L. Tigue Moore Field • Lafayette, LA	**W** 3–1		26–16	11–8

May (11–2)
Date	Opponent	Site/stadium	Score	TV	Overall record	SBC record
May 1	Middle Tennessee	M. L. Tigue Moore Field • Lafayette, LA	**W** 6–4		27–16	12–8
May 1	Middle Tennessee	M. L. Tigue Moore Field • Lafayette, LA	**W** 2–1		28–16	13–8
May 7	at New Orleans	Maestri Field at Privateer Park • New Orleans, LA	**W** 16–7		29–16	14–8
May 8	at New Orleans	Maestri Field at Privateer Park • New Orleans, LA	**W** 4–1		30–16	15–8
May 9	at New Orleans	Maestri Field at Privateer Park • New Orleans, LA	**W** 5–4		31–16	16–8
May 11	at Southern	Lee–Hines Field • Baton Rouge, LA	**W** 7–5		32–16	
May 14	Western Kentucky	M. L. Tigue Moore Field • Lafayette, LA	**L** 1–2		32–17	16–9
May 15	Western Kentucky	M. L. Tigue Moore Field • Lafayette, LA	**W** 12–5		33–17	17–9
May 16	Western Kentucky	M. L. Tigue Moore Field • Lafayette, LA	**W** 4–3		34–17	18–9
May 18	at McNeese State	Joe Miller Ballpark • Lake Charles, LA	**L** 4–5		34–18	
May 21	at Louisiana–Monroe	Warhawk Field • Monroe, LA	**W** 6–5		35–18	19–9
May 21	at Louisiana–Monroe	Warhawk Field • Monroe, LA	**W** 10–4		36–18	20–9
May 22	at Louisiana–Monroe	Warhawk Field • Monroe, LA	**W** 13–1		37–18	21–9

Postseason (1–4)

SBC Tournament (0–2)
Date	Opponent	Site/stadium	Score	TV	Overall record	SBC record
May 26	vs. Arkansas State	Reese Smith Jr. Field • Murfreesboro, TN	**L** 6–8		37–19	
May 27	vs. Middle Tennessee	Reese Smith Jr. Field • Murfreesboro, TN	**L** 0–3		37–20	

NCAA Division I Baseball Championship (1–2)
Date	Opponent	Site/stadium	Score	TV	Overall record	SBC record
Austin Regionals
Jun. 4	vs. No. 25 Rice	UFCU Disch-Falk Field • Austin, TX	**W** 1–0		38–20	
Jun. 5	vs. No. 5 Texas	UFCU Disch-Falk Field • Austin, TX	**L** 2–4		38–21	
Jun. 6	vs. No. 25 Rice	UFCU Disch-Falk Field • Austin, TX	**L** 1–9		38–22	

Schedule source:

- Rankings are based on the team's current ranking in the Collegiate Baseball poll.

== Austin Regional ==
Austin Regional Teams
(1) Texas Longhorns	(2) Rice Owls	(3) Louisiana–Lafayette Ragin' Cajuns	(4) Rider Broncs

First Round
1	Texas	11
4	Rider	0
3	Louisiana–Lafayette	1
2	Rice	0
Lower round 1
4	Rider	1
2	Rice	19

Semi-Finals
1	Texas	4
3	Louisiana–Lafayette	2
Lower final
2	Rice	9
3	Louisiana–Lafayette	1

Finals
1	Texas
2	Rice
