= 2011 Louisiana–Lafayette Ragin' Cajuns baseball team =

American college baseball season

2011 Louisiana–Lafayette Ragin' Cajuns baseball
- Conference: Sun Belt Conference
- Record: 31-27 (18-12 SBC)
- Head coach: Tony Robichaux (17th season)
- Assistant coaches: Anthony Babineaux; Michael Trahan
- Home stadium: M. L. Tigue Moore Field

2011 Sun Belt Conference baseball standings
	Conf.				Overall
Team	W		L	PCT	W		L	PCT
Troy ‍†‍‍^{y}	21	–	9	.700	43	–	19	.694
FIU ‍‍‍^{y}	20	–	9	.690	40	–	20	.667
Louisiana–Lafayette ‍‍‍	18	–	12	.600	31	–	27	.534
Florida Atlantic ‍‍‍	17	–	13	.567	32	–	25	.561
Western Kentucky ‍‍‍	17	–	13	.567	33	–	24	.579
South Alabama ‍‍‍	15	–	15	.500	30	–	28	.517
Arkansas–Little Rock ‍‍‡‍^{y}	10	–	20	.333	24	–	34	.414
Middle Tennessee ‍‍‍	9	–	21	.300	18	–	37	.327
Louisiana–Monroe ‍‍‍	9	–	21	.300	24	–	30	.444
† – Conference champion ‡ – Tournament champion y – Invited to the NCAA tournament As of June 30, 2011; Rankings from Collegiate Baseball

The 2011 Louisiana–Lafayette Ragin' Cajuns baseball team represented the University of Louisiana at Lafayette in the 2011 NCAA Division I baseball season. The Ragin' Cajuns played their home games at M. L. Tigue Moore Field and were led by seventeenth year head coach Tony Robichaux.

== Roster ==
2011 Louisiana-Lafayette Ragin' Cajuns roster
Pitchers: 5 Randall Bulliard - Senior; 12 Ryland Parker - Senior; 14 Chase Traffica - Sophomore; 17 Jordan Nicholson - Junior; 21 Josh Bailey - Senior; 23 Michael Cook - Senior; 27 Kyle Neely - Redshirt Freshman; 28 Taylor Hubbell - Senior; 30 Blake Wascom - Junior; 31 Caleb Kellogg - Redshirt Freshman; 33 Joe Zimmerman - Junior; 34 Ben Frith - Junior; 37 Joey Satriano - Senior; 38 Manning Duhon - Sophomore; 39 Jacques De Gruy - Redshirt Freshman; 40 T. J. Geith - Senior; 43 Ethan Hebert - Junior; Catchers: 11 Michael Strenz - Redshirt Freshman; 13 Chris Sinclair - Junior	Infielders: 1 Greg Fontenot - Senior; 6 Jordan Bourque - Junior; 7 Ryan Leonards - Redshirt Freshman; 8 Trask Switzenberg - Senior; 9 Jordan Poirrier - Senior; 10 Tyler Frederick - Sophomore; 26 Matt Hicks - Redshirt Freshman; 32 Chase Compton - Redshirt Freshman; 42 Thomas Simoneaux - Redshirt Freshman; 44 Tyler Girouard - Redshirt Freshman; Outfielders: 2 Dominick Franca - Redshirt Freshman; 4 Daniel Nichols - Junior; 19 Lance Marvel - Senior; 22 Mike Petello - Senior; 24 Matt Goulas - Senior; 25 Brian Bowman - Junior; 29 Alex Fuselier - Junior

=== Coaching staff ===
2012 Louisiana-Lafayette Ragin' Cajuns coaching staff
- Tony Robichaux – Head Coach – 17th year
- Anthony Babineaux – Associate head coach – 17th year
- Michael Trahan – Assistant Head Coach – 4th year
- Chris Domingue – Director of Baseball Operations – 9th year

== Schedule and results ==
Legend
	Louisiana-Lafayette win
	Louisiana-Lafayette loss
	Postponement
**Bold**	Louisiana-Lafayette team member

2011 Louisiana–Lafayette Ragin' Cajuns baseball game log
Regular season (31–24)

February (5–3)
Date	Opponent	Site/stadium	Score	TV	Overall record	SBC record
Feb. 18	Southeast Missouri State	M. L. Tigue Moore Field • Lafayette, LA	**L** 2-4		0-1	
Feb. 19	Southeast Missouri State	M. L. Tigue Moore Field • Lafayette, LA	**L** 1-9		0-2	
Feb. 20	Southeast Missouri State	M. L. Tigue Moore Field • Lafayette, LA	**W** 4-2		1-2	
Feb. 22	Nicholls State	M. L. Tigue Moore Field • Lafayette, LA	**W** 5-4		2-2	
Feb. 23	at Nicholls State	Ray E. Didier Field • Thibodaux, LA	**L** 2-3		2-3	
Feb. 25	Siena	M. L. Tigue Moore Field • Lafayette, LA	**W** 4-3		3–3	
Feb. 26	Siena	M. L. Tigue Moore Field • Lafayette, LA	**W** 5-4		4-3	
Feb. 27	Siena	M. L. Tigue Moore Field • Lafayette, LA	**W** 1-0		5-3	

March (8-8)
Date	Opponent	Site/stadium	Score	TV	Overall record	SBC record
Mar. 1	Southern	M. L. Tigue Moore Field • Lafayette, LA	**W** 10-4		6-3	
Mar. 4	at Southern Miss	Pete Taylor Park • Hattiesburg, MS	Game canceled			
Mar. 5	at Southern Miss	Pete Taylor Park • Hattiesburg, MS	Game canceled			
Mar. 6	at Southern Miss	Pete Taylor Park • Hattiesburg, MS	**L** 5-6		6-4	
Mar. 6	at Southern Miss	Pete Taylor Park • Hattiesburg, MS	**W** 8-4		7-4	
Mar. 9	at Southeastern Louisiana	Pat Kenelly Diamond at Alumni Field • Hammond, LA	**L** 5-7		7-5	
Cal Baseball Classic
Mar. 11	vs. California	AT&T Park • San Francisco, CA	**L** 6-7		7-6	
Mar. 12	vs. UC Santa Barbara	AT&T Park • San Francisco, CA	**L** 2-4		7-7	
Mar. 13	vs. San Francisco	AT&T Park • San Francisco, CA	**L** 0-4		7-8	
Mar. 15	Alcorn State	M. L. Tigue Moore Field • Lafayette, LA	**W** 12-3		8-8	
Mar. 18	Louisiana-Monroe	M. L. Tigue Moore Field • Lafayette, LA	**L** 1-2		8-9	0–1
Mar. 19	Louisiana-Monroe	M. L. Tigue Moore Field • Lafayette, LA	**L** 3-6		8-10	0–2
Mar. 20	Louisiana-Monroe	M. L. Tigue Moore Field • Lafayette, LA	**W** 11-0		9-10	1–2
Mar. 22	at No. 9 LSU	Alex Box Stadium, Skip Bertman Field • Baton Rouge, LA	**W** 11-5		10-10	
Mar. 25	at Arkansas State	Tomlinson Stadium-Kell Field • Jonesboro, AR	**W** 10-9		11-10	2-2
Mar. 27	at Arkansas State	Tomlinson Stadium-Kell Field • Jonesboro, AR	**L** 7-11		11-11	2–3
Mar. 27	at Arkansas State	Tomlinson Stadium-Kell Field • Jonesboro, AR	**W** 10-4		12-11	3-3
Mar. 29	Northwestern State	M. L. Tigue Moore Field • Lafayette, LA	**W** 6-3		13-11	

April (12–8)
Date	Opponent	Site/stadium	Score	TV	Overall record	SBC record
Apr. 1	Florida Atlantic	M. L. Tigue Moore Field • Lafayette, LA	**W** 2-1		14-11	4–3
Apr. 2	Florida Atlantic	M. L. Tigue Moore Field • Lafayette, LA	**W** 6-2		15-11	5–3
Apr. 3	Florida Atlantic	M. L. Tigue Moore Field • Lafayette, LA	**W** 5-2		16-11	6–3
Apr. 5	at Rice	Reckling Park • Houston, TX	**W** 2-0		17-11	
Apr. 8	at Western Kentucky	Nick Denes Field • Bowling Green, KY	**L** 1-5		17-12	6–4
Apr. 9	at Western Kentucky	Nick Denes Field • Bowling Green, KY	**L** 1-2		17-13	6–5
Apr. 10	at Western Kentucky	Nick Denes Field • Bowling Green, KY	**W** 8-6		18-13	7–5
Apr. 12	McNeese State	M. L. Tigue Moore Field • Lafayette, LA	**W** 12-3		19-13	
Apr. 13	at Northwestern State	H. Alvin Brown–C. C. Stroud Field • Natchitoches, LA	**L** 1-7		19-14	
Apr. 15	at FIU	FIU Baseball Stadium • Miami, FL	**W** 7-3		20-14	8–5
Apr. 16	at FIU	FIU Baseball Stadium • Miami, FL	**L** 2-8		20-15	8–6
Apr. 17	at FIU	FIU Baseball Stadium • Miami, FL	**L** 5-11		20-16	8–7
Apr. 19	at McNeese State	Joe Miller Ballpark • Lake Charles, LA	**L** 6-7		20-17	
Apr. 20	at Southern	Lee-Hines Field • Baton Rouge, LA	**W** 13-5		21-17	
Apr. 22	South Alabama	M. L. Tigue Moore Field • Lafayette, LA	**L** 1-3		21-18	8-8
Apr. 23	South Alabama	M. L. Tigue Moore Field • Lafayette, LA	**W** 7-6		22-18	9–8
Apr. 24	South Alabama	M. L. Tigue Moore Field • Lafayette, LA	**W** 5-4		23-18	10–8
Apr. 26	Southeastern Louisiana	M. L. Tigue Moore Field • Lafayette, LA	**L** 2-6		23-19	
Apr. 29	Arkansas-Little Rock	M. L. Tigue Moore Field • Lafayette, LA	**W** 6-3		24-19	11–8
Apr. 30	Arkansas-Little Rock	M. L. Tigue Moore Field • Lafayette, LA	**W** 7-6		25-19	12–8

May (6–5)
Date	Opponent	Site/stadium	Score	TV	Overall record	SBC record
May 1	Arkansas-Little Rock	M. L. Tigue Moore Field • Lafayette, LA	**W** 5-1		26-19	13–8
May 6	at Troy	Riddle-Pace Field • Troy, AL	**L** 1-7		26-20	13–9
May 7	at Troy	Riddle-Pace Field • Troy, AL	**W** 17-1		27-20	14–9
May 8	at Troy	Riddle-Pace Field • Troy, AL	**L** 3-13		27-21	14–10
May 10	No. 27 Rice	M. L. Tigue Moore Field • Lafayette, LA	**L** 1-2		27-22	
May 13	Middle Tennessee	M. L. Tigue Moore Field • Lafayette, LA	**L** 1-3		27-23	14–11
May 14	Middle Tennessee	M. L. Tigue Moore Field • Lafayette, LA	**W** 4-3		28-23	15–11
May 15	Middle Tennessee	M. L. Tigue Moore Field • Lafayette, LA	**W** 4-3		29-23	16–11
May 19	at Louisiana-Monroe	Warhawk Field • Monroe, LA	**W** 6-2		30-23	18–11
May 20	at Louisiana-Monroe	Warhawk Field • Monroe, LA	**W** 11-1		31-23	19–11
May 21	at Louisiana-Monroe	Warhawk Field • Monroe, LA	**L** 3-4		31-24	19–12

Postseason (0–3)

SBC Tournament (0–3)
Date	Opponent	Site/stadium	Score	TV	Overall record	SBC record
May 26	vs. South Alabama	Warhawk Field • Monroe, LA	**L** 6-10		31-25	
May 27	vs. Arkansas State	Warhawk Field • Monroe, LA	**L** 0-3		31-26	
May 28	vs. FIU	Warhawk Field • Monroe, LA	**L** 8-11		31-27	

Schedule source:

- Rankings are based on the team's current ranking in the Collegiate Baseball poll.
