= Haught =

Haught is a surname. Notable people with the surname include:

- Gary Haught (born 1970), American baseball player
- John F. Haught, American Roman Catholic theologian
- Officer Nicole Haught, a fictional character from Wynonna Earp (TV series)
