= Jose Alvarez (baseball, born 1956) =

American baseball player (born 1956)

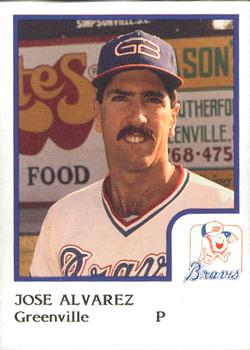
- Alvarez with the Greenville Braves in 1986
- Pitcher
- Born: April 12, 1956 (age 70); Tampa, Florida, U.S.
- Batted: Right Threw: Right

MLB debut
- October 1, 1981, for the Atlanta Braves

Last MLB appearance
- June 24, 1989, for the Atlanta Braves

MLB statistics
- Win–loss record: 8–9
- Earned run average: 2.99
- Strikeouts: 134
- Stats at Baseball Reference

Teams
- Atlanta Braves (1981–1982, 1988–1989)

Jose Lino Alvarez (born April 12, 1956) is an American former Major League Baseball pitcher. He played four seasons at the major league level for the Atlanta Braves. He played for the Braves in 1981 and 1982, then spent five seasons in the minor leagues before returning to the Braves in 1988 and 1989. After a successful season in 1988, winning the Atlanta team's Most Outstanding Pitcher Award, he began the 1989 season with 2 wins and a save.

== Playing career ==
Álvarez attended Hillsborough High School, then Hillsborough Community College, both in Tampa, Florida. He then attended the University of Southwestern Louisiana (now the University of Louisiana at Lafayette), where he played for the Ragin' Cajuns baseball team.

Alvarez played his first professional season with Atlanta's Rookie-league Kingsport Braves in 1978. After appearing in the majors in 1981 and 1982, he returned to the majors as a rookie in 1988 at age 32. He was named Atlanta's “Most Outstanding Pitcher” in 1988. He last pitched in the majors in 1989, going 3–3 with a 2.86 ERA in 30 relief appearances.

In 1995, he was a replacement player for Atlanta in spring training during the ongoing strike. His last professional appearance was with the Triple-A Richmond Braves in 1995.

Alvarez was inducted in the Ragin' Cajuns Hall of Fame in 2019, the Clarinda A's Hall of Fame in 1998, and the Hillsborough High School Hall of Fame in 2008.

== Post-playing career and personal life ==
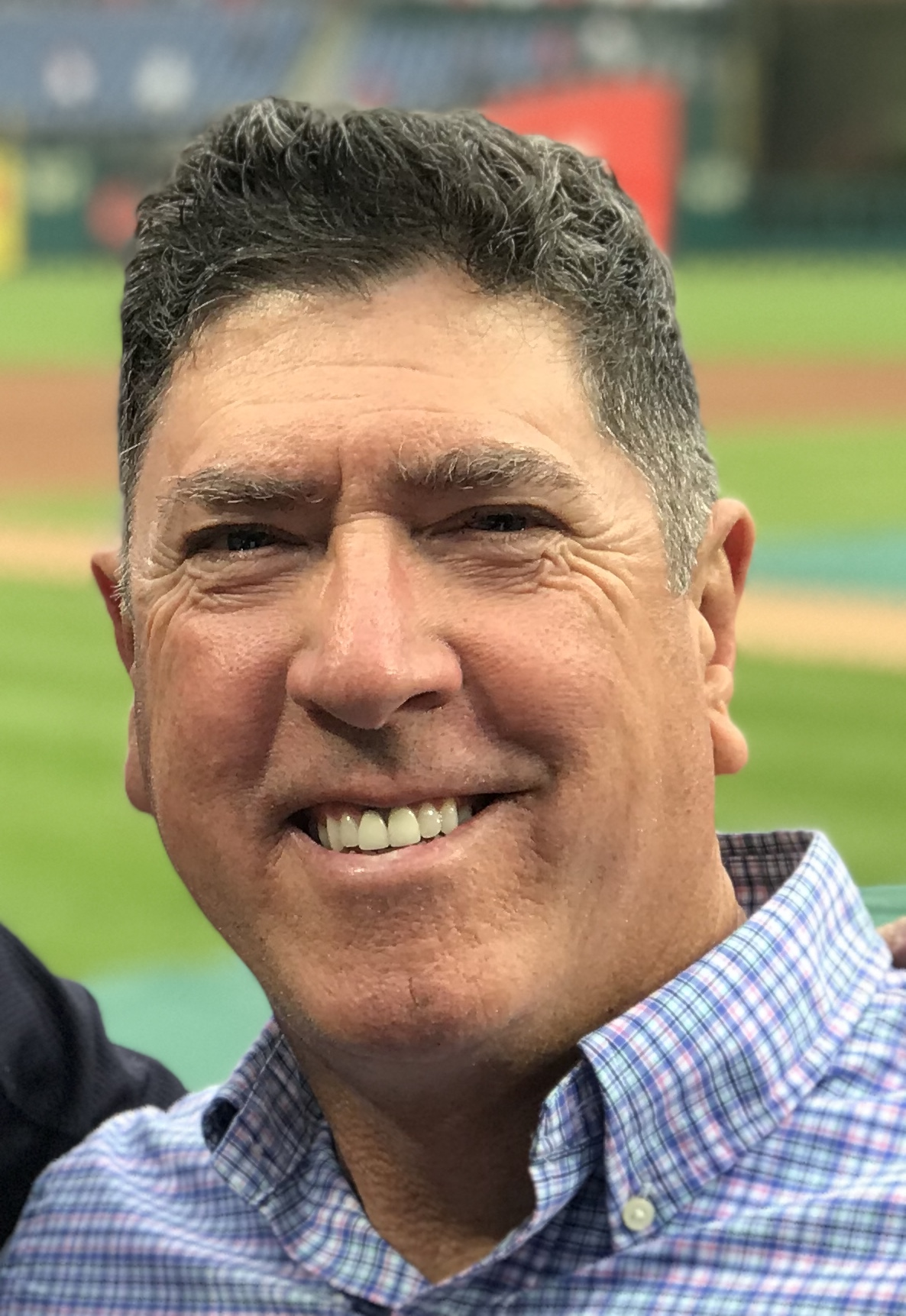
Alvarez in 2018

Alvarez and his wife married in 1981 have spoken at FamilyLife marriage conferences around the country. They have three children and four grandchildren. He currently resides in Greenville, South Carolina. He has coached youth baseball and high school baseball in Greenville.

From 2007 to 2022, Alvarez served as a life coach and mentor to the PGA’s Korn Ferry Tour players, wives and caddies with the FCA Golf Ministry. He now serves with Links Players International.

An avid golfer, he has competed in many celebrity events around the country. He has made four aces and was the Senior Club Champion at Legacy Pines for three consecutive years (2019–2021) and won the 2018 Korn Ferry’s BMW Charity Pro- Am in the low handicap celebrity division.
