= Mike Boulanger =

American baseball coach and scout

Michael Boulanger (born August 21, 1949, at Ponca City, Oklahoma) is an American baseball coach and scout. He is scheduled to spend the 2014 season as a scout for the Baltimore Orioles of Major League Baseball, after working in 2012–2013 as the Orioles' minor league hitting coordinator.

Boulanger, nicknamed "Bo," graduated from Ponca City High School and Oklahoma State University, where he played baseball and football. He was a center fielder in his playing days, standing 6 feet (1.83 m) tall, weighing 180 pounds (82 kg). He threw and batted right-handed. Boulanger did not play professional baseball, but instead immediately went into coaching at Broken Arrow High School in Oklahoma in 1971. From 1977–94, he served in the college ranks, as an assistant coach at the University of Oklahoma and then as head coach at Oklahoma City University and the University of Southwestern Louisiana, compiling a record of 353 wins and 204 defeats (.634).

Boulanger joined professional baseball in 1995 as a minor league manager, handling Rookie, Short Season A and Class A farm clubs of the Minnesota Twins and Boston Red Sox through 2002. In 2003 he joined the Texas Rangers' system as a minor league coach and roving minor league hitting coordinator, serving through 2011.

== Head coaching record ==
Record table
Season	Team	Overall	Conference	Standing	Postseason
Oklahoma City Chiefs (Midwestern City Conference) (1982–1983)
1982	Oklahoma City	28–26	5–3	2nd (South)	
1983	Oklahoma City	30–31	6–7	2nd (South)	
Oklahoma City:		58–57 (.504)	11–10 (.524)		
Louisiana Ragin' Cajuns (American South Conference) (1988–1991)
1988	Southwestern Louisiana	41–23	6–8		
1989	Southwestern Louisiana	49–13	11–4	1st	NCAA Regional
1990	Southwestern Louisiana	47–18	11–4	1st	NCAA Regional
1991	Southwestern Louisiana	49–20	14–4	1st	NCAA Regional
Louisiana Ragin' Cajuns (Sun Belt Conference) (1992–1994)
1992	Southwestern Louisiana	38–23	14–6	1st (West)	NCAA Regional
1993	Southwestern Louisiana	25–29	10–11	3rd (West)	
1994	Southwestern Louisiana	42–15	16–8	1st (West)	
Southwestern Louisiana:		291–141 (.674)	– (–)		
Total:		349–198 (.638)			
National champion Postseason invitational champion Conference regular season champion Conference regular season and conference tournament champion Division regular season champion Division regular season and conference tournament champion Conference tournament champion
