= Tony Robichaux =

American baseball player and coach (1961–2019)

Biographical details
- Born: September 10, 1961; Crowley, Louisiana, U.S.
- Died: July 3, 2019 (aged 57); Jefferson, Louisiana, U.S.

Playing career
- 1982-1984: Southwestern Louisiana
- 1985–1986: McNeese State

Coaching career (HC unless noted)
- 1987–1994: McNeese State
- 1995–2019: Southwestern Louisiana/Louisiana-Lafayette/Louisiana

Head coaching record
- Overall: 1,173–765–2 (.605)

Accomplishments and honors

Awards
- 4x Sun Belt Coach of the Year (1997, 2005, 2007, 2014); Southland Coach of the Year (1988); Southwestern Louisiana Coach of the Year (1997); 5x Louisiana-Lafayette Coach of the Year (1999, 2000, 2007, 2010, 2014); 4x ABCA South Central Region Coach of the Year (1999, 2000, 2010, 2014)

Anthony Ray Robichaux (September 10, 1961 – July 3, 2019) was an American college baseball coach who served as head coach of the Louisiana Ragin' Cajuns baseball team. He had previously served as head coach at McNeese State.

== Coaching career ==
=== McNeese State ===
Robichaux played at McNeese State, and became interim head coach immediately after ending his playing career. He was made permanent head coach following the 1987 season, and remained with the Cowboys until 1994. Only once in his time at McNeese State did the Cowboys finish below .500, and in his final season he led the team to their first 40 win season and first national ranking. Robichaux's pitching staffs placed among the nation's top six three times in five years, including 2nd in 1990. He is currently the all-time winningest coach at McNeese State, with 263 victories leading the Cowboys.

=== Louisiana ===
For the 1995 season, Robichaux was hired as the head coach of the Southwestern Louisiana Ragin' Cajuns baseball team. In his twenty-five seasons with the school, he led his team to twelve NCAA Regionals, four NCAA Super Regionals, the 2000 College World Series, and two athletic name changes (In 1999, the name changed from Southwestern Louisiana to Louisiana-Lafayette. In 2018, the athletic name was officially changed to Louisiana). In addition, Robicheaux coached the team to five Sun Belt Conference regular season titles and the 1998 Sun Belt Conference Baseball Tournament, 2014 Sun Belt Conference baseball tournament and 2015 Sun Belt Conference baseball tournament championships. He became the Ragin' Cajuns all-time leader in wins on March 17, 2003.

== Head coaching record ==
Record table
| Season | Team | Overall | Conference | Standing | Postseason |
|---|---|---|---|---|---|
McNeese State Cowboys (Southland Conference) (1987–1994)
| 1987 | McNeese State | 19–28 | 7–9 | 2nd West Zone (3) | |
| 1988 | McNeese State | 31–31 | 13–7 | 1st (8) | NCAA Regional |
| 1989 | McNeese State | 35–18 | 10–7 | 3rd (8) | |
| 1990 | McNeese State | 35–20 | 10–7 | 3rd (7) | |
| 1991 | McNeese State | 34–18 | 4–11 | 7th (7) | |
| 1992 | McNeese State | 30–22 | 9–12 | 5th (9) | |
| 1993 | McNeese State | 38–23 | 14–10 | 4th (9) | NCAA Regional |
| 1994 | McNeese State | 41–17 | 13–9 | 4th (9) | |
| McNeese State: | | 263–177 | 80–72 | | |
Southwestern Louisiana / Louisiana–Lafayette / Louisiana Ragin' Cajuns (Sun Belt Conference) (1995–2019)
| 1995 | Southwestern Louisiana | 21–24 | 12–15 | 6th (10) | |
| 1996 | Southwestern Louisiana | 25–33 | 15–12 | 3rd (10) | |
| 1997 | Southwestern Louisiana | 43–18 | 22–5 | 1st (10) | NCAA Regional |
| 1998 | Southwestern Louisiana | 39–22 | 18–7 | 2nd (10) | NCAA Regional |
| 1999 | Southwestern Louisiana | 42–24 | 24–9 | 2nd (8) | Super Regional |
| 2000 | Louisiana–Lafayette | 49–20 | 20–10 | 2nd (8) | College World Series |
| 2001 | Louisiana–Lafayette | 28–28 | 12–15 | 9th (10) | |
| 2002 | Louisiana–Lafayette | 39–23 | 17–7 | 2nd (9) | NCAA Regional |
| 2003 | Louisiana–Lafayette | 30–30 | 15–9 | 3rd (9) | |
| 2004 | Louisiana–Lafayette | 34–23 | 11–11 | 4th (9) | |
| 2005 | Louisiana–Lafayette | 48–19 | 16–8 | 1st (9) | NCAA Regional |
| 2006 | Louisiana–Lafayette | 39–20 | 19–5 | 2nd (9) | |
| 2007 | Louisiana–Lafayette | 45–17 | 23–7 | 1st (11) | NCAA Regional |
| 2008 | Louisiana–Lafayette | 30–29 | 16–14 | 6th (11) | |
| 2009 | Louisiana–Lafayette | 27–30–1 | 14–15 | 5th (11) | |
| 2010 | Louisiana–Lafayette | 38–22 | 21–9 | 1st (11) | NCAA Regional |
| 2011 | Louisiana–Lafayette | 31–27 | 18–12 | 3rd (10) | |
| 2012 | Louisiana–Lafayette | 23–30 | 11–19 | 10th (10) | |
| 2013 | Louisiana–Lafayette | 43–20 | 19–11 | 3rd (10) | NCAA Regional |
| 2014 | Louisiana–Lafayette | 58–10 | 26–4 | 1st (10) | Super Regional |
| 2015 | Louisiana–Lafayette | 42–23 | 18–11 | 3rd (11) | Super Regional |
| 2016 | Louisiana–Lafayette | 43–21 | 21–9 | 1st (11) | NCAA Regional |
| 2017 | Louisiana–Lafayette | 35–21–1 | 19–10–1 | 2nd (West) (6) | |
| 2018 | Louisiana | 30–23 | 15–12 | 1st (West) | |
| 2019 | Louisiana | 28–31 | 15–15 | 4th (West) | |
| Louisiana: | | 910–588–2 | 437–261–1 | | |
| Total: | | 1173–765–2 | | | |
National champion Postseason invitational champion Conference regular season champion Conference regular season and conference tournament champion Division regular season champion Division regular season and conference tournament champion Conference tournament champion

== Death ==
On July 3, 2019, Robichaux died at Ochsner Medical Center in Jefferson, Louisiana, a suburb of New Orleans, after suffering a heart attack June 23, 2019. He was 57 at the time of his death and is buried in Crowley, Louisiana.

On opening weekend of the 2020 season, former players of Robichaux unveiled a statue of Robichaux near M. L. Tigue Moore Field at Russo Park.

Throughout the shortened season, as well as the 2021 season, many teams, such as Maryland (whose assistant coach was also assistant under Robichaux) as well as Troy wore #36, a symbol of Tony Robichaux on batting helmets, hats, and jerseys.

During a 2020 midweek game between Louisiana and McNeese State, two of Robichaux's former teams, home team McNeese renamed their bullpen in Robichaux's honor.

== Protégés ==
Seven of Robichaux's assistants went on to become college head coaches: Matt Deggs who replaced him at UL, and who had previously served as head coach at Sam Houston State; John Szefc at Virginia Tech; Todd Butler at McNeese State and Wichita State; Jim Ricklefsen at McNeese State; Brad Holland at ULM; Wade Simoneaux at Louisiana Tech University; and Jason Gonzales at Texas A&M University-Kingsville.

== See also ==
- List of college baseball career coaching wins leaders
