= Terry Burrows (baseball) =

American baseball player

- Pitcher
- Born: November 28, 1968 (age 57); Lake Charles, Louisiana, U.S.
- Batted: Left Threw: Left

Professional debut
- MLB: June 12, 1994, for the Texas Rangers
- NPB: April 30, 2000, for the Orix BlueWave

Last appearance
- MLB: June 11, 1997, for the San Diego Padres
- NPB: October 15, 2000, for the Orix BlueWave

MLB statistics
- Win–loss record: 4–4
- Earned run average: 6.42
- Strikeouts: 35

NPB statistics
- Win–loss record: 5–4
- Earned run average: 5.40
- Strikeouts: 45
- Stats at Baseball Reference

Teams
- Texas Rangers (1994–1995); Milwaukee Brewers (1996); San Diego Padres (1997); Orix BlueWave (2000)

Terry Dale Burrows (born November 28, 1968) is an American former professional baseball pitcher. He is 6 feet 1 inch (1.85 m) tall, weighs 185 pounds (84 kg), and batted and threw left-handed. Burrows attended McNeese State University, where he played college baseball for the Cowboys. He was drafted by the Texas Rangers in the seventh round of the 1990 MLB draft. Terry played four years in Major League Baseball, two with the Rangers (1994–1995), and one each with the Milwaukee Brewers (1996) and San Diego Padres (1997). In 50 career games pitched, Burrows had a 2–2 record with an ERA of 6.42. He also pitched one season in the Nippon Professional Baseball (NPB) for the Orix BlueWave in 2000.

For six seasons (2008–2013), Burrows was the head baseball coach at McNeese State.

== Head coaching records ==
The following is a table of Burrows's yearly records as an NCAA head baseball coach.

Statistics overview
Season	Team	Overall	Conference	Standing	Postseason
McNeese State Cowboys (Southland Conference) (2008–2013)
2008	McNeese State	13–42	7–23	5th (East)	
2009	McNeese State	21–30	10–22	10th	
2010	McNeese State	31–27	16–17	T–6th	Southland Tournament
2011	McNeese State	26–30	14–19	10th	
2012	McNeese State	24–30	17–16	5th	Southland Tournament
2013	McNeese State	23–31	10–17	8th	Southland Tournament
McNeese State:		138–190	74–114		
Total:		138–190			
National champion Postseason invitational champion Conference regular season champion Conference regular season and conference tournament champion Division regular season champion Division regular season and conference tournament champion Conference tournament champion
