= Louisiana Ragin' Cajuns baseball =

Baseball team of the University of Louisiana at Lafayette

Louisiana Ragin' Cajuns
- 2026 Louisiana Ragin' Cajuns baseball team
- Founded: 1903 (123 years ago)
- University: University of Louisiana at Lafayette
- Head coach: Matt Deggs (7th season)
- Nickname: Ragin' Cajuns
- Colors: Vermilion and white

College World Series appearances
- 2000

NCAA regional champions
- 1999, 2000, 2014, 2015

NCAA tournament appearances
- 1988, 1990, 1991, 1992, 1997, 1998, 1999, 2000, 2002, 2005, 2007, 2010, 2013, 2014, 2015, 2016, 2022, 2023, 2024, 2026

Conference tournament champions
- American South: 1988, 1990, 1991; Sun Belt: 1998, 2014, 2015, 2016, 2022

Conference regular season champions
- Gulf States: 1949, 1950, 1951, 1952, 1953; Southland: 1972, 1973; American South: 1989, 1990, 1991; Sun Belt: 1997, 2005, 2007, 2010, 2014, 2016, 2024

The Louisiana Ragin' Cajuns baseball team is the college baseball team of the University of Louisiana at Lafayette. The Ragin' Cajuns compete in NCAA Division I in the Sun Belt Conference. They play their home games on campus at M. L. Tigue Moore Field at Russo Park and were coached by head coach Tony Robichaux, until his death on July 3, 2019. Matt Deggs was named the new head coach on July 17, 2019, and 2020 marked his first season.

== History ==
=== Conference membership history ===
- 1903–1947: Independent
- 1948–1971: Gulf States Conference
- 1972–1982: Southland Conference
- 1983–1987: Independent
- 1988–1991: American South Conference
- 1992–present: Sun Belt Conference

== Head coaches ==
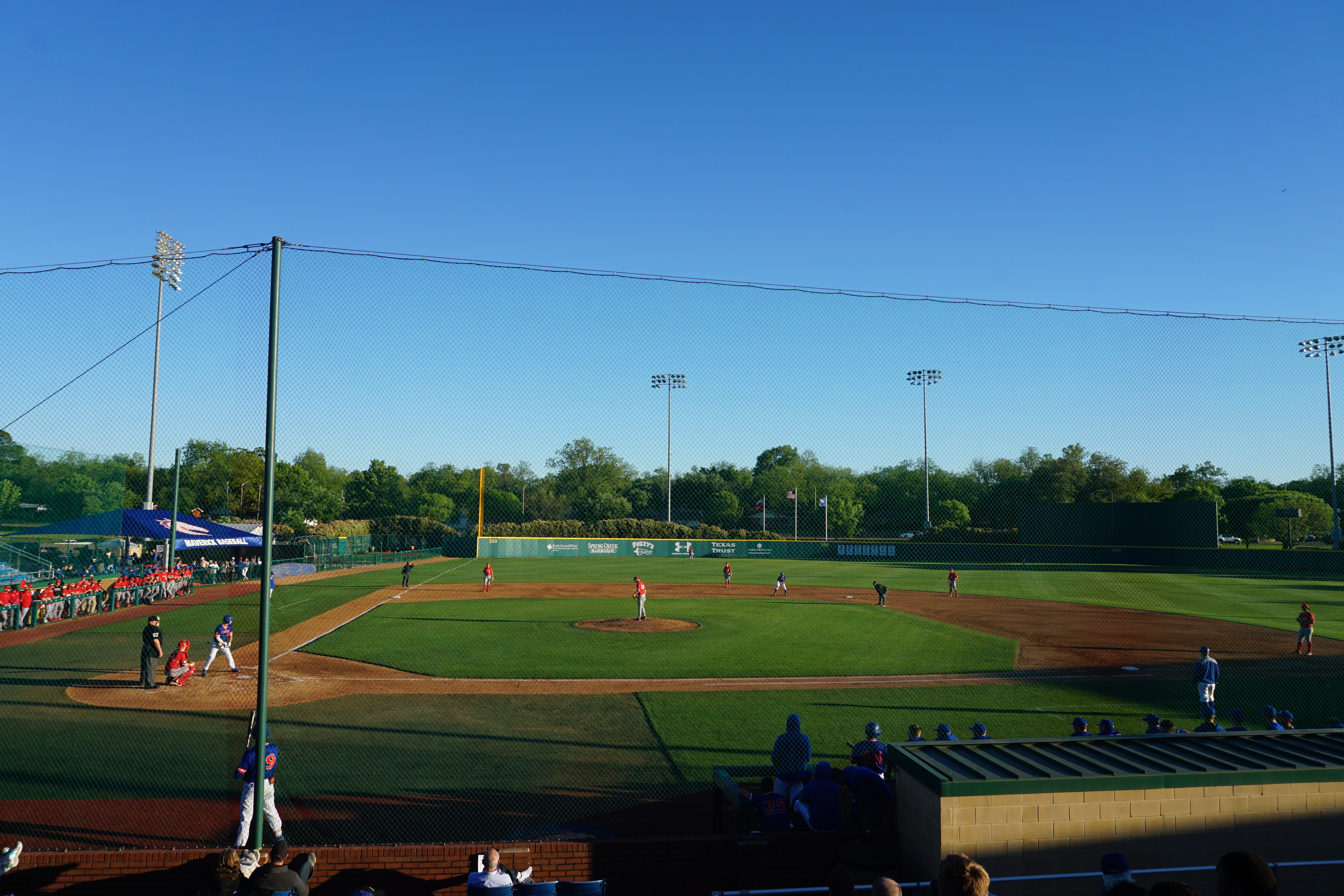
Louisiana playing at UT Arlington in 2019

Coach	Seasons	Years	W	L	T	Pct
C.J. McNaspy	2	1909–1910				
J.G. Lee	5	1912–16	23	19	0	.548
T.R. Mobley	6	1922–27	32	29	2	.524
Cliff Johnson	6	1939–41, 1945–47	27	30	2	.475
Johnny Cain	3	1942–1944				
Ray Didier	9	1948–56	137	78	0	.637
Pete Wilson	2	1960–61	23	36	0	.390
Sonny Roy	6	1962–67	88	86	1	.506
Eddie Mouton	1	1968	12	23	0	.343
Bob Banna	3	1969–71	59	47	0	.557
Don Lockwood	9	1972–80	207	197	2	.512
Mel Didier	2	1981–82	73	48	1	.602
Brad Kelley	2	1983–84	68	39	0	.636
Gene Shell	3	1985–87	77	59	0	.566
Emrick Jagneaux	1	1987	8	10	0	.444
Mike Boulanger	7	1988–94	291	141	0	.674
Tony Robichaux	22	1995–2019	817	513	1	.614
Matt Deggs	5	2020–present	168	91	0	.618

== NCAA Regional appearances ==
NCAA Regional Results
1989 Midwest Regional at Stillwater, OK

Lost to Wichita State, 2–6
Lost to McNeese State, 6–11

1990 South I Regional at Baton Rouge, LA

Lost to LSU, 0–8
Lost to Southern Miss, 10–14

1991 South Regional at Baton Rouge, LA

Lost to Texas A&M, 4–16
Defeated Northwestern State, 11–7
Defeated South Alabama, 6–3
Defeated Texas A&M, 13–10
Lost to LSU, 5–8

1992 Central Regional at Austin, TX

Lost to Long Beach State, 6–7
Lost to VCU, 5–12

1997 Mideast Regional at Starkville, MS

Lost to Washington, 4–5
Lost to Georgia Tech, 0–8

1998 South II Regional at Baton Rouge, LA

Lost to Tulane, 5–11
Lost to LSU, 6–15

1999 Houston, TX Regional

Defeated Texas, 13–6
Defeated Houston, 5–3
Defeated Houston, 19–8

2000 Lafayette, LA Regional

Defeated McNeese State, 11–5
Defeated East Carolina, 5–3
Defeated East Carolina, 8–5

Louisiana receives #1 seed and hosts an NCAA Regional Tournament for the first time

2002 Baton Rouge, LA Regional

Defeated Tulane, 6–3
Defeated LSU, 5–0
Lost to LSU, 12–2
Lost to LSU, 12–2

2005 New Orleans, LA Regional

Lost to Alabama, 5–7
Defeated Southern, 9–1
Lost to Alabama, 3–4

2007 College Station, TX Regional

Defeated Ohio State, 5–4
Defeated Texas A&M, 5–4
Lost to Texas A&M, 1–4
Lost to Texas A&M, 2–5

2010 Austin, TX Regional

Defeated Rice, 1–0
Lost to Texas, 2–4
Lost to Rice, 1–9

2013 Baton Rouge, LA Regional

Lost to Sam Houston State, 2–4
Defeated Jackson State, 15–1
Defeated Sam Houston State, 7–5
Lost to LSU, 1–5

2014 Lafayette, LA Regional

Lost to Jackson State, 0–1
Defeated San Diego State, 9–2
Defeated Jackson State, 11–1
Defeated Mississippi State, 14–8
Defeated Mississippi State, 5–3

Louisiana receives #6 National Seed for the NCAA Super Regionals and hosts an NCAA Regional Tournament for a second time

2015 Houston, TX Regional

Defeated Rice, 7–6
Defeated Houston, 2–1
Defeated Rice, 5–2

2016 Lafayette, LA Regional

Defeated Princeton, 5–3
Defeated Arizona, 10–3
Lost to Arizona, 3–6
Lost to Arizona, 1–3

Louisiana hosts an NCAA Regional Tournament for a third time

2022 College Station, TX Regional

Defeated TCU, 7–6
Lost to Texas A&M, 6–9
Lost to TCU, 1–6

2023 Coral Gables, FL Regional

Lost to Texas, 2–4
Defeated Maine, 19–10
Lost to Miami, 5–8

2024 College Station, TX Regional

Lost to Texas, 5–12
Defeated Grambling State, 12–5
Defeated Texas, 10–2
Lost to Texas A&M, 4–9

2026 Starkville, MS Regional

Lost to Cincinnati, 2–12
Defeated Lipscomb, 10–4
Defeated Cincinnati, 8–6
Lost to Mississippi State, 5–19

== NCAA Super Regional appearances ==
NCAA Super Regional Results
1999 Houston, TX Super Regional

Defeated Rice, 12–8
Lost to Rice, 1–10
Lost to Rice, 3–8

2000 Columbia, SC Super Regional

Lost to South Carolina, 3–6
Defeated South Carolina, 7–1
Defeated South Carolina, 3–2

2014 Lafayette, LA Super Regional

Defeated Ole Miss, 9–5
Lost to Ole Miss, 2–5
Lost to Ole Miss, 4–10

Louisiana hosts an NCAA Super Regional Tournament for the first time

2015 Baton Rouge, LA Super Regional

Lost to LSU, 3–4
Lost to LSU, 3–6

== NCAA College World Series appearances ==
NCAA College World Series Results
2000 College World Series at Johnny Rosenblatt Stadium, Omaha, NE

Lost to No. 8 Stanford, 4–6
Defeated San Jose State, 6–3
Defeated No. 4 Clemson, 5–4
Lost to No. 8 Stanford, 9–19

== Year-by-year results ==
Record table
Season	Coach	Overall	Conference	Standing	Postseason
Southwestern Louisiana Bulldogs (Southland Conference) (1972–1973)
1972	Don Lockwood	33–8	15–3	1st	
1973	Don Lockwood	14–19	8–4	1st	
Southwestern Louisiana Ragin' Cajuns (Southland Conference) (1974–1982)
1974	Don Lockwood	22–28	5–10	5th	
1975	Don Lockwood	22–22	9–6	3rd	
1976	Don Lockwood	22–24	6–9	5th	
1977	Don Lockwood	24–20	7–8	3rd	
1978	Don Lockwood	37–15	13–7	3rd	
1979	Don Lockwood	14–32	8–12	4th	
1980	Don Lockwood	19–29–2	1–13	3rd (South)	
1981	Mel Didier	40–23	11–5	2nd (South)	
1982	Mel Didier	33–25–1	13–3	1st (South)	
Southland:		280–245–3	96–80		
Southwestern Louisiana Ragin' Cajuns (Independent) (1983–1987)
1983	Brad Kelley	29–31			
1984	Brad Kelley	39–18			
1985	Gene Shell	35–23			
1986	Gene Shell	33–26			
1987	Gene Shell; Emrick Jagneaux	17–29			
Independent:		153–127			
Southwestern Louisiana Ragin' Cajuns (American South Conference) (1988–1991)
1988	Mike Boulanger	41–23	6–8		NCAA Regionals
1989	Mike Boulanger	49–13	11–4	1st	
1990	Mike Boulanger	47–18	11–4	1st	NCAA Regionals
1991	Mike Boulanger	49–20	14–4	1st	NCAA Regionals
American South:		186–74	42–20		
Southwestern Louisiana Ragin' Cajuns (Sun Belt Conference) (1992–1999)
1992	Mike Boulanger	38–23	14–6	1st (West)	NCAA Regionals
1993	Mike Boulanger	25–29	10–9	3rd (West)	
1994	Mike Boulanger	42–15	16–8	1st (West)	
1995	Tony Robichaux	21–24	12–15	6th	
1996	Tony Robichaux	25–33	15–12	3rd	
1997	Tony Robichaux	43–18	22–5	1st	NCAA Regionals
1998	Tony Robichaux	39–22	18–7	2nd	NCAA Regionals
1999	Tony Robichaux	42–24	24–9	2nd	NCAA Super Regionals
Louisiana–Lafayette Ragin' Cajuns (Sun Belt Conference) (2000–2017)
2000	Tony Robichaux	49–20	20–10	2nd	NCAA CWS
2001	Tony Robichaux	28–28	12–15	7th	
2002	Tony Robichaux	39–23	17–7	2nd	NCAA Regionals
2003	Tony Robichaux	30–30	15–9	3rd	
2004	Tony Robichaux	34–23	11–11	4th	
2005	Tony Robichaux	48–19	16–8	1st	NCAA Regionals
2006	Tony Robichaux	39–20	19–5	2nd	
2007	Tony Robichaux	45–17	23–7	1st	NCAA Regionals
2008	Tony Robichaux	30–29	16–14	5th	
2009	Tony Robichaux	27–30–1	14–15	5th	
2010	Tony Robichaux	38–22	21–9	1st	NCAA Regionals
2011	Tony Robichaux	31–27	18–12	3rd	
2012	Tony Robichaux	23–20	11–19	10th	
2013	Tony Robichaux	43–20	19–11	3rd	NCAA Regionals
2014	Tony Robichaux	58–10	26–4	1st	NCAA Super Regionals
2015	Tony Robichaux	42–12	20–3	1st	NCAA Super Regionals
2016	Tony Robichaux	42–23	18–11	1st	NCAA Regionals
2017	Tony Robichaux	35–21–1	19–10–1	2nd (West)	
Louisiana Ragin' Cajuns (Sun Belt Conference) (2018–present)
2018	Tony Robichaux	34–25	18–12	1st (West)	
2019	Tony Robichaux	28–31	15–15	4th (West)	NCAA Regionals
2020	Matt Deggs	8–9	0–0	No conference season	Season canceled due to the COVID-19 pandemic
2021	Matt Deggs	32–23	13–11	1st (West)	
2022	Matt Deggs	37–23	19–11	4th	NCAA Regionals
2023	Matt Deggs	41–24	18–12	4th	NCAA Regionals
2024	Matt Deggs	42–20	23–7	2nd	NCAA Regionals
Sun Belt:		1,137–726–2	530–318–1		
Total:		1,756–1,172–5			
National champion Postseason invitational champion Conference regular season champion Conference regular season and conference tournament champion Division regular season champion Division regular season and conference tournament champion Conference tournament champion

== Record versus opponent ==
Opponent	Won	Lost	Tied	Pct.	Last Played
Abilene Christian	6	0	0	1.000	1973
Air Force	1	0	0	1.000	1980
Alabama	4	5	0	.444	2015
Alcorn State	5	0	0	1.000	2012
Arizona	1	2	0	.333	2016
Arizona State	0	3	0	.000	2007
Arkansas	4	2	0	.667	2022
Army	3	0	0	1.000	2008
Baylor	0	1	0	.000	2003
Bethune–Cookman	1	0	0	1.000	1996
BYU	4	1	0	.800	2023
California	0	1	0	.000	2011
Campbell	1	2	0	.333	2023
Canisius	2	1	0	.667	1980
Central Michigan	3	1	0	.750	2013
Chicago State	2	0	0	1.000	1990
Clemson	2	1	0	.667	2000
Cleveland State	2	0	0	1.000	1983
Creighton	2	0		1.000	1992
Dallas Baptist	5	0	0	1.000	2000
Dartmouth	4	0	0	1.000	1991
East Carolina	2	3	0	.400	2009
Eastern Illinois	3	2	0	.600	2014
Evansville	0	1	0	.000	2006
Florida Atlantic	10	11	0	.476	2013
FIU	27	27	0	.500	2013
Florida	0	6	0	.000	1997
Florida State	0	6	0	.000	1998
Fresno State	1	5	0	.167	1991
Furman	2	1	0	.667	2004
George Washington	3	0	0	1.000	1992
Georgia Tech	0	1	0	.000	1997
Gonzaga	0	1	0	.000	2012
Grambling State	12	4	0	.750	2023
Harvard	3	0		1.000	2005
Hawai'i	0	1	0	.000	2005
High Point	2	1	0	.667	2023
Hofstra	1	0	0	1.000	2017
Houston	16	40	0	.286	2022
Houston Baptist	12	1	0	.923	2021
Illinois	6	2	0	.750	2007
UIC	5	2	0	.714	2003
Indiana	0	1	0	.000	2022
Indiana State	2	1	0	.667	1997
Iowa	2	1	0	.667	2006
Iowa State	2	0	0	1.000	1999
Jackson State	8	1	0	.889	2023
Jacksonville	9	5	0	.643	1998
Kansas	1	0	0	1.000	2012
Kansas State	1	0	0	1.000	1986
Kentucky	0	1	0	.000	2018
Kent State	2	0	0	1.000	1994
Lamar	56	71	1	.441	2008
Le Moyne	4	2	0	.667	2010
Little Rock	63	25	0	.716	2022
Long Beach State	1	1	0	.500	1992
LSU	28	56	0	.333	2023
Louisiana Tech	84	72	0	.538	2023
Louisville	1	1	0	.500	1979
Loyola Marymount	1	2	0	.333	2019
Maine	6	3	0	.667	2023
Marist	1	0	0	1.000	2005
Maryland	2	1	0	.667	2019
McNeese State	99	68	0	.593	2023
Memphis	1	4	0	.200	1985
Miami	0	1	0	.000	2023
Miami (OH)	3	2	0	.600	2010
Michigan	1	0	0	1.000	2004
Michigan State	1	0	0	1.000	2020
Middle Tennessee State	34	30	0	.531	2013
Minnesota	3	1	0	.750	2006
Mississippi	3	3	0	.500	2014
Mississippi State	2	3	0	.400	2023
Mississippi Valley State	9	0	0	1.000	1991
Missouri	2	0	0	1.000	1994
Missouri State	2	0	0	1.000	1997
Murray State	0	1	0	.000	2017
Nebraska	3	6	1	.350	2009
New Mexico State	15	5	0	.750	2005
New Orleans	83	69	0	.546	2019
New York Tech	1	1	0	.500	1985
Nicholls	77	55	0	.583	2022
North Alabama	3	0	0	1.000	2021
Northern Illinois	4	3	0	.571	1978
Northwestern State	90	49	0	.647	2023
Ohio State	2	2	0	.500	2007
Oklahoma	3	0	0	1.000	2000
Oklahoma State	4	8	0	.333	1996
Oral Roberts	3	6	0	.333	2008
Oregon State	1	1	0	.500	1991
Prairie View A&M	14	0	0	1.000	1996
Princeton	1	0	0	1.000	2016
Purdue	0	1	0	.000	2006
Rice	17	18	0	.486	2023
Sacramento State	1	0	0	1.000	2005
Sacred Heart	6	0	0	1.000	2016
Saint Peter's	3	0	0	1.000	2017
Saint Louis	4	0	0	1.000	1990
St. John's	2	0	0	1.000	2005
Samford	1	2	0	.333	2020
Sam Houston State	18	8	0	.692	2020
San Francisco	0	1	0	.000	2011
San Jose State	1	0	0	1.000	2000
Santa Clara	0	1	0	.000	2012
Siena	8	0	0	1.000	2011
South Carolina	2	1	0	.667	2000
South Florida	2	0	0	1.000	2005
Southeast Missouri State	1	2	0	.333	2011
Southeastern Louisiana	72	53	0	.576	2023
Southern	52	23	1	.691	2023
Stanford	0	2	0	.000	2000
Stephen F. Austin	15	1	0	.938	2009
Stetson	1	2	0	.333	1986
Stony Brook	5	1	0	.833	2015
Texas	8	34	0	.190	2023
Texas A&M	9	14	0	.391	2022
Texas A&M–Corpus Christi	3	0	0	1.000	2006
Texas–Rio Grande Valley	37	17	0	.685	2005
Texas Southern	15	0	0	1.000	2014
Texas Tech	3	2	0	.600	2016
Towson	3	0	0	1.000	2012
Tulane	53	47	0	.530	2023
TCU	5	5	0	.500	2022
UC Davis	1	0	0	1.000	2005
UC Irvine	2	1	0	.667	2022
UC Santa Barbara	0	2	0	.000	2011
UCF	11	4	0	.733	2002
UNLV	4	1	0	.800	1992
USC	1	0	0	1.000	1989
UT Arlington	36	23	0	.610	2022
UTSA	12	5	0	.706	2015
Vanderbilt	1	0	0	1.000	2018
Virginia Tech	1	2	0	.333	2020
VCU	0	1	0	.000	1992
Washington	1	1	0	.500	1997
Western Illinois	5	1	0	.833	2001
Western Kentucky	44	27	0	.620	2010
Western Michigan	3	0	0	1.000	1976
Wichita State	4	9	0	.308	2012
Wisconsin	5	5	0	.500	1981
Wright State	1	2	0	.333	2018
Xavier	3	1	0	.750	1975

- Last updated at the conclusion of the 2023 season.

== Record against Sun Belt ==
Opponent	Won	Lost	Tied	Pct.	Last Played
Appalachian State	12	5	0	.706	2022
Arkansas State	91	42	0	.684	2023
Coastal Carolina	11	7	1	.605	2023
Georgia Southern	9	11	0	.450	2022
Georgia State	16	2	0	.889	2022
James Madison	0	3	0	.000	2023
Louisiana–Monroe	101	55	0	.647	2023
Marshall	3	0	0	1.000	2023
South Alabama	55	70	0	.440	2023
Southern Miss	30	31	0	.492	2023
Texas State	30	21	0	.588	2023
Troy	37	26	0	.587	2023

- Last updated at the conclusion of the 2023 conference tournament. The Cajuns have yet to play games against conference foe Old Dominion.

== NCAA tournament appearances ==
- The Ragin' Cajuns reached the 2000 College World Series and eventually finished tied for 3rd after defeating Clemson but losing out to Stanford before the title game.
- Hosted NCAA Regional in 2000, 2014, and 2016.
- Hosted NCAA Super Regional in 2014.
- Hosted NCAA Regional in 2016
- In all, the Louisiana Ragin Cajuns have had 17 different NCAA Postseason appearances, including the 2015 Houston Regional and the Baton Rouge Super Regional.

== Ragin' Cajuns in the Major Leagues ==
- Jose Alvarez
- Spencer Arrighetti
- Paul Bako
- Chad Beck
- Alvin Dark
- Scott Dohmann
- Danny Farquhar
- Ron Guidry
- Gary Haught
- Xavier Hernandez
- Jim Holloway
- Jonathan Lucroy
- B. J. Ryan
- Donne Wall
- Blake Trahan

== Major League Baseball ==
The Louisiana Ragin Cajuns have had 114 Major League Baseball draft selections since the draft began in 1965.

Ragin' Cajuns in the Major League Baseball Draft
Year	Player	Rd	Team
1970	Sylvester Swindler	34	Senators
1971	Charles Bordes	11	Giants
1971	Ron Guidry	3	Yankees
1972	Alton Torregano	6	Dodgers
1972	Charles Bordes	1	Rangers
1976	Kevin Jeansenne	13	Indians
1978	Jose Alvarez	8	Braves
1980	Steven Jenter	23	Indians
1981	George Hoffman	26	Mets
1982	Robert D'Agostino	15	Pirates
1983	Robert D'Agostino	14	White Sox
1984	Walter Guillory	45	Rangers
1984	David Alvis	44	Rangers
1984	Garrett O'Connor	9	Giants
1985	Garrett O'Connor	2	Yankees
1985	David Alvis	31	Indians
1986	Ron Robicheaux	32	Pirates
1986	Glen Anderson	27	Phillies
1986	Jose Salva	12	Blue Jays
1986	Xavier Hernandez	4	Blue Jays
1987	Brad Hebets	36	Rangers
1987	Adam Lamle	23	Rangers
1988	Chris Howard	41	Mariners
1988	Brad Hebets	41	Indians
1988	Ruben Rodriguez	20	Brewers
1988	Howard Landry	15	Red Sox
1989	Kevin Meyers	41	Blue Jays
1989	Todd Unrein	37	Reds
1989	John Jarvis	32	Yankees
1989	David Smith	27	Mariners
1989	Donne Wall	18	Astros
1989	David King	16	Royals
1990	Damian Grossie	40	Rangers
1990	Todd Unrein	31	Orioles
1990	Joseph Burnett	17	Marlins
1990	Greg Blevins	15	Rangers
1990	Kevin McDonald	9	Brewers
1990	Perry Berry	4	Astros
1991	Tommy Bates	15	Indians
1992	Yariel Ramos	23	Giants
1992	Gary Haught	22	Athletics
1992	Javy DeJesus	17	Twins
1993	Joe Jumonville	29	Cardinals
1993	Scott Perkins	15	Brewers
1993	Paul Bako	5	Reds
1994	Brandon Credeur	38	Reds
1995	Darrin Babineaux	2	Dodgers
1996	Blaine Phillips	33	Yankees
1997	Jim Fritz	41	Phillies
1997	Trey Poland	5	Rangers
1998	B.J. Ryan	17	Reds
1999	Mo Douglas	35	Pirates
1999	Jeff Robinson	7	Brewers
1999	Phil Devey	5	Dodgers
2000	Ryan Gill	17	Yankees
2000	Todd Self	15	Astros
2000	Rick Haydel	11	Diamondbacks
2000	Nate Nelson	10	Astros
2000	Nick Webb	9	Rockies
2000	Ken Holubec	9	Twins
2000	Scott Dohmann	6	Rockies
2000	Danny Massiatte	6	Devil Rays
2001	Eric Templet	27	Mets
2001	Neil Simoneaux	18	Cardinals
2002	Chase Lambin	34	Mets
2002	Justin Gabriel	30	Brewers
2003	Austin Faught	35	Rangers
2004	Austin Faught	43	Rangers
2005	Justin Morgan	39	Cubs
2005	Austin Faught	31	Rangers
2005	Phil Hawke	29	Rangers
2005	Dallas Morris	24	Angels
2005	Kevin Ardoin	10	Tigers
2006	Chad Beck	14	Diamondbacks
2006	Jason Fernandez	11	Athletics
2007	Devery Van De Keere	48	Royals
2007	Matt Pilgreen	29	Yankees
2007	Jefferies Tatford	15	Mets
2007	Andrew Laughter	10	Rangers
2007	Jonathan Lucroy	3	Brewers
2008	Hunter Moody	35	Blue Jays
2008	Danny Farquhar	10	Blue Jays
2009	Greg Wilborn	18	Dodgers
2010	Charles Keefer	28	Marlins
2010	Dayton Marze	14	Blue Jays
2010	Zach Osborne	9	Rangers
2011	Theron Geith	39	Rays
2011	Alex Fuselier	21	Pirates
2012	Jordan Harrison	25	Rays
2014	Matt Plitt	37	Rays
2014	Carson Baranik	33	Dodgers
2014	Ryan Leonards	21	White Sox
2014	Austin Robichaux	18	Angels
2014	Jace Conrad	13	Rays
2014	Caleb Adams	10	Angels
2014	Seth Harrison	7	Giants
2015	Blake Trahan	3	Reds
2016	Eric Carter	26	Cardinals
2016	Stefan Trosclair	20	Cardinals
2016	Reagan Bazar	17	Giants
2017	Evan Guillory	23	Cardinals
2017	Wyatt Marks	13	Athletics
2017	Steven Sensley	12	Yankees
2018	Colten Schmidt	23	Rockies
2018	Nick Lee	9	Rays
2018	Logan Stoelke	9	Pirates
2018	Hogan Harris	3	Athletics
2019	Todd Lott	9	Cardinals
2020	Hayden Cantrelle	5	Brewers
2021	Spencer Arrighetti	6	Astros
2021	Connor Cooke	10	Blue Jays
2021	Drake Osborn	19	Mets
2022	Bo Bonds	13	Blue Jays
2022	Tyler Robertson	14	Padres
2023	Carson Roccaforte	2	Royals
2023	Julian Brock	8	Rangers
2023	Jackson Nezuh	14	Astros
2024	Kyle DeBarge	1	Twins
2024	LP Langevin	4	Royals

== See also ==
- List of NCAA Division I baseball programs
