= Gary Haught =

American baseball player (born 1970)

- Pitcher
- Born: September 29, 1970 (age 55); Tacoma, Washington, U.S.
- Batted: Both Threw: Right

MLB debut
- July 16, 1997, for the Oakland Athletics

Last MLB appearance
- August 2, 1997, for the Oakland Athletics

MLB statistics
- Win–loss record: 0–0
- Earned run average: 7.15
- Strikeouts: 11

CPBL statistics
- Win–loss record: 0–3
- Earned run average: 3.60
- Strikeouts: 10
- Stats at Baseball Reference

Teams
- Oakland Athletics (1997); Mercuries Tigers (1999)

Gary Allen Haught (born September 29, 1970) is an American former professional baseball pitcher.

Haught attended Choctaw High School in Choctaw, Oklahoma, and the University of Louisiana at Lafayette, where he pitched for the Louisiana-Lafayette Ragin' Cajuns baseball team.

Haught was drafted by the Oakland Athletics in the 22nd round (620th overall) of the 1992 Major League Baseball draft. He appeared in six games for the Athletics in 1997, pitching a total of 11 1/3 innings.
