= Matt Deggs =

American baseball coach and former infielder

Current position
- Title: Head coach
- Team: Louisiana
- Conference: Sun Belt
- Record: 228–155
- Annual salary: $350,000

Biographical details
- Born: August 20, 1971 (age 55); Texas City, Texas, U.S.
- Education: Northwood University, 1994; Northwestern State University (Masters, 1996)

Playing career
- 1991–1992: Alvin
- 1993–1994: Northwood
- 1995: Mobile BaySharks
- 1996-1997: Tennessee Tomahawks
- Position: Infield

Coaching career (HC unless noted)
- 1996–1997: Northwestern State (assistant)
- 1998–2002: Texarkana
- 2003–2005: Arkansas (assistant)
- 2006–2010: Texas A&M (assistant)
- 2012–2014: Louisiana–Lafayette (assistant)
- 2015–2019: Sam Houston State
- 2020–present: Louisiana

Head coaching record
- Overall: 415–273 (NCAA) 187–100 (NJCAA)
- Tournaments: NCAA: 9–10; Southland 12–7; Sun Belt: 15–7

Accomplishments and honors

Championships
- 2× TEAC (2001, 2002); NJCAA World Series Appearance; 3× Southland (2016, 2018, 2019); 2× Southland tournament (2016, 2017); Sun Belt Tournament (2022); 2× Sun Belt West Division (2021, 2024); Sun Belt (2024)

Awards
- Sun Belt Coach of the Year (2024); Southland Coach of the Year (2016)

Matt Deggs (born August 20, 1971) is an American college baseball coach and former infielder who is the current head baseball coach for the Louisiana Ragin' Cajuns. He played college baseball at Alvin Community College (1991–1992) then transferred to Northwood University (1993–1994) before playing professional baseball for 3 seasons from 1995 to 1997. He then served as the head coach of the Sam Houston State Bearkats (2015–2019).

== Playing career ==
Deggs played college baseball at Alvin Community College before transferring to Northwood University and a brief professional career with the Mobile BaySharks and the Tennessee Tomahawks for three years.

== Coaching career ==
Deggs became an assistant coach at Northwestern State for two seasons. He completed his undergraduate degree at Northwestern State and then became head coach at Texarkana. He then was a hitting and infield coach at Arkansas for 3 seasons, Texas A&M for six seasons during which he rose to become Associate Head Coach, and three seasons at Louisiana before beginning at Sam Houston State. After 5 seasons at Sam Houston, Deggs was named head coach of the Louisiana Ragin Cajuns’ baseball team on July 17, 2019, following the death of longtime head coach, Tony Robichaux.

== Head coaching record ==
Below is a table of Deggs' Head Coaching years.

Record table
Season	Team	Overall	Conference	Standing	Postseason
Texarkana College Tigers (Texas Eastern Athletic Conference) (1998–2002)
Texarkana College (NJCAA):		187–100	NJCAA World Series Appearance		
Sam Houston State Bearkats (Southland Conference) (2015–2019)
2015	Sam Houston State	31–28	17–12	5th	Southland tournament
2016	Sam Houston State	42–22	24–6	1st	NCAA Regional
2017	Sam Houston State	44–23	19–11	3rd	NCAA Super Regional
2018	Sam Houston State	39–20	24–6	1st	Southland tournament
2019	Sam Houston State	31–25	20–10	1st	Southland tournament
Sam Houston State:		187–118	104–45		
Louisiana Ragin' Cajuns (Sun Belt Conference) (2020–present)
2020	Louisiana	8–9	0–0	(West)	Season canceled due to COVID-19
2021	Louisiana	32–23	13–11	T–1st (West)	Sun Belt Tournament
2022	Louisiana	37–23	19–11	4th	NCAA Regional
2023	Louisiana	41–24	18–12	4th	NCAA Regional
2024	Louisiana	42–20	23–7	1st	NCAA Regional
2025	Louisiana	27-31	16-14	T–4th	Sun Belt Tournament
2026	Louisiana	41–25	16–14	T–6th	NCAA Regional
Louisiana:		228–155	105–69		
Total:		415–273			
National champion Postseason invitational champion Conference regular season champion Conference regular season and conference tournament champion Division regular season champion Division regular season and conference tournament champion Conference tournament champion

== Personal life ==
Deggs is married to Kathy Saldua. They have three children; one son: Kyler, and two daughters: Klaire and Khloe.

== See also ==
- List of current NCAA Division I baseball coaches
