= H. Alvin Brown–C. C. Stroud Field =

Baseball venue in Natchitoches, Louisiana

- Brown–Stroud Field, The B'Stro
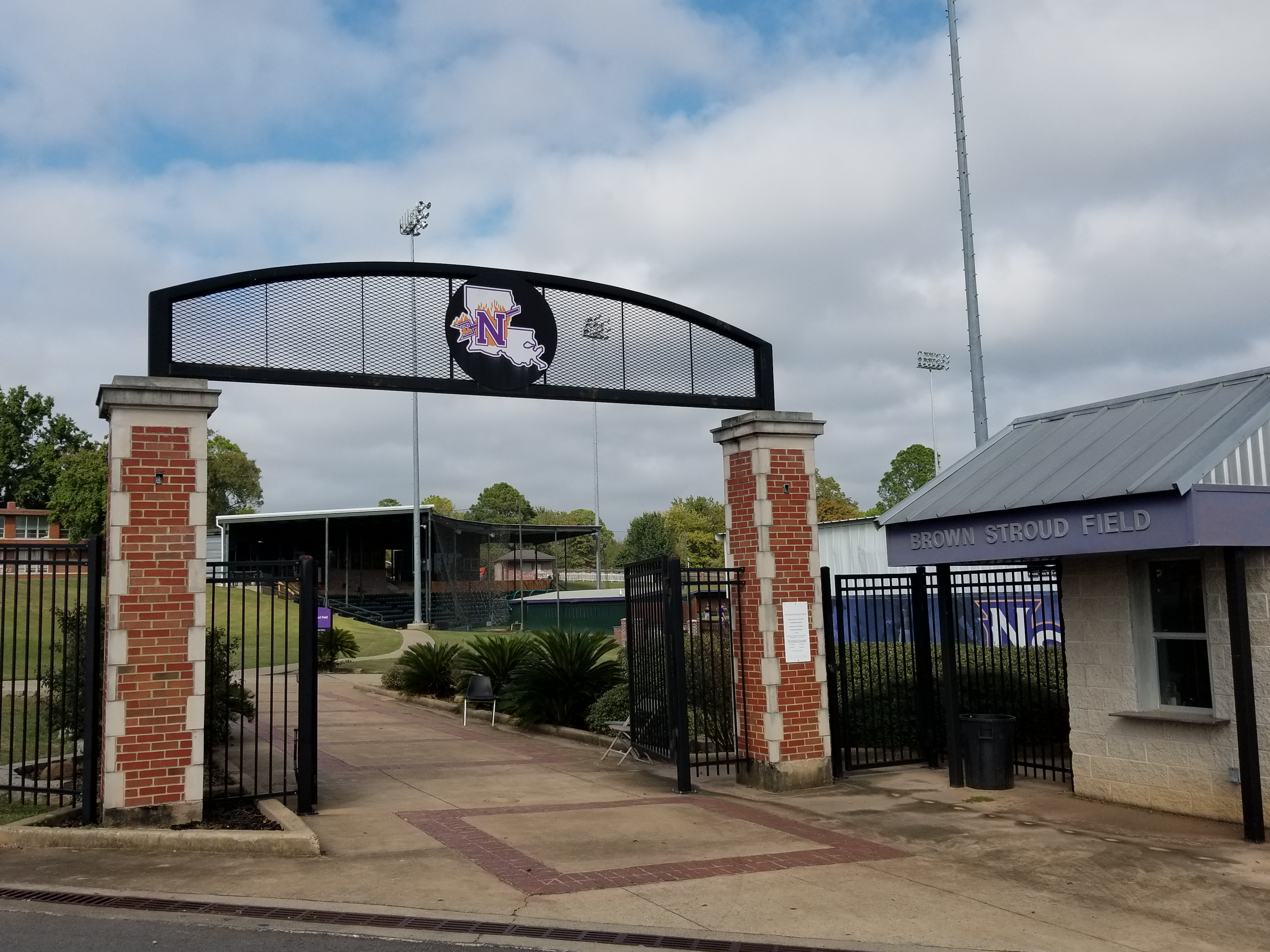
- Interactive map of H. Alvin Brown–C. C. Stroud Field
- Location: Central Avenue, Natchitoches, Louisiana, United States
- Coordinates: 31°44′49.4″N 93°05′38″W
- Owner: Northwestern State University
- Operator: Northwestern State University
- Capacity: 1,200
- Surface: Artificial turf
- Scoreboard: 17'H x 40'W LED
- Record attendance: 4,214 (April 18, 2011, vs. LSU)
- Field size: 321 ft. (LF), 361 ft. (LCF), 391 ft. (CF), 366 ft. (RCF), 336 ft. (RF)

Construction
- Opened: April 1, 1939

Tenant
- Northwestern State Demons baseball (Southland)

Brown–Stroud Field is a baseball venue in Natchitoches, Louisiana, United States. It is home to the Northwestern State Demons baseball team of the NCAA Division I Southland Conference. Opened on April 1, 1939, the venue has a capacity of 1,200 spectators. It is named after the first two coaches of the Northwestern State baseball program: C. C. Stroud, who coached from 1912 to 1930, and H. Alvin Brown, who coached from 1949 to 1966. Recently added features include chairback seating, an awning that partially covers seating areas, a turf infield, landscaping, and a sound system. The venue's bleacher seating and dugouts have recently been renovated. Ahead of the 2025 season, the infield turf and the outfield natural grass were replaced with no-infill artificial turf. The outfield wall was also replaced with a padded wall. During the 2025 season, a new LED video board was installed in right-field.

== Attendance ==
The following is a list of the top 10 single-game attendance figures, as of the end of the 2014 season.

Rank	Attendance	Date	Opponent
1.	4,214	April 18, 2001	LSU
2.	2,329	April 9, 2003	LSU
3.	2,136	March 6, 2014	LSU
4.	1,835	April 9, 1991	LSU
5.	1,374	April 8, 2003	Alabama
6.	1,263	May 15, 1994	McNeese State
7.	1,173	May 25, 2005	Southeastern Louisiana
8.	1,112	February 26, 1992	Louisiana–Lafayette
9.	867	February 18, 2011	Brigham Young University
10.	853	May 18, 1994	McNeese State

== See also ==
- List of NCAA Division I baseball venues
