= McNeese Cowboys baseball =

Baseball team representing McNeese State University

McNeese Cowboys
- 2026 McNeese Cowboys baseball team
- University: McNeese State University
- Head coach: Justin Hill (13th season)
- Conference: Southland
- Location: Lake Charles, Louisiana
- Home stadium: Joe Miller Ballpark (capacity: 2,000)
- Nickname: Cowboys
- Colors: Royal blue and gold

NCAA tournament appearances
- 1988, 1993, 2000, 2003, 2019, 2021

Conference tournament champions
- Southland: 1993, 2003, 2019, 2021

Conference regular season champions
- GSC: 1956; Southland: 1988, 2000, 2006, 2017, 2022

The McNeese State Cowboys baseball team is a varsity intercollegiate athletic team of McNeese State University in Lake Charles, Louisiana, United States. The team is a member of the Southland Conference, which is part of the National Collegiate Athletic Association's Division I. The team plays its home games at Joe Miller Ballpark in Lake Charles, Louisiana. The Cowboys are coached by Justin Hill.

== Head coaches ==
| Coach | Seasons | Years | W | L | T | Pct |
|---|---|---|---|---|---|---|
| Cliff Johnson | 2 | 1953–54 | 8 | 24 | 0 | .250 |
| Kenneth Bahnsen | 1 | 1956 | 6 | 12 | 0 | .333 |
| Reed Stephens | 6 | 1957–61 | 78 | 72 | 0 | .520 |
| Ralph O. Ward | 1 | 1962 | 14 | 14 | 0 | .500 |
| Ted Chapman | 3 | 1963–1965 | 24 | 58 | 0 | .292 |
| Desmond Jones | 2 | 1966–67 | 19 | 34 | 1 | .361 |
| Hubert Boales | 10 | 1968–77 | 190 | 197 | 4 | .491 |
| Johnny Suydam | 3 | 1978–80 | 71 | 67 | 0 | .514 |
| Triny Rivera | 6 | 1981–1986 | 141 | 171 | 2 | .452 |
| Tony Robichaux | 8 | 1987–94 | 263 | 173 | 0 | .603 |
| Jim Ricklefsen | 3 | 1995–97 | 83 | 79 | 1 | .512 |
| Mike Bianco | 3 | 1997–00 | 100 | 71 | 0 | .584 |
| Todd Butler | 3 | 2001–03 | 90 | 83 | 0 | .520 |
| Chad Clement | 4 | 2004–07 | 82 | 84 | 0 | .494 |
| Terry Burrows | 6 | 2008–13 | 190 | 157 | 0 | .548 |
| Justin Hill | 11 | 2014–present | 333 | 265 | 0 | .557 |

== Year-by-year results ==
| Year | Coach | Overall record | Conference record | Notes |
|---|---|---|---|---|
| 1953 | Cliff Johnson | 1–13 | 0–9; 6th | |
| 1954 | Cliff Johnson | 7–11 | 4–7; 5th | |
| 1955 | Kenneth Bahnsen | 6–12 | 4–8; 6th | |
| 1956 | Reed Stephens | 11–5 | 9–3; 1st | Gulf States Conference Champions |
| 1957 | Reed Stephens | 9–13 | 5–8; 4th | |
| 1958 | Reed Stephens | 11–10 | 6–9; 6th | |
| 1959 | Reed Stephens | 11–18 | 4–11; 6th | |
| 1960 | Reed Stephens | 15–14 | 6–9; 5th | |
| 1961 | Reed Stephens | 21–12 | 12–7; 3rd | |
| 1962 | Ralph O. Ward | 14–14 | 10–9; 4th | |
| 1963 | Ted Chapman | 9–17 | 8–12; 4th | |
| 1964 | Ted Chapman | 8–18 | 4–12; 6th | |
| 1965 | Ted Chapman | 7–23 | 4–16; 6th | |
| 1966 | Desmond Jones | 5–21 | 5–17; 7th | |
| 1967 | Desmond Jones | 14–13–1 | 11–10–1; 3rd | |
| 1968 | Hubert Boales | 13–20–1 | 9–12–1; 4th | |
| 1969 | Hubert Boales | 19–16 | 14–10; 3rd | |
| 1970 | Hubert Boales | 19–17 | 14–10; 4th | |
| 1971 | Hubert Boales | 20–18–1 | 11–11; 4th | |
| 1972 | Hubert Boales | 22–15 | | |
| 1973 | Hubert Boales | 15–16 | 5–7; 6th | |
| 1974 | Hubert Boales | 21–24 | 10–5; 4th | |
| 1975 | Hubert Boales | 16–26 | 5–10; 5th | |
| 1976 | Hubert Boales | 26–19–2 | 7–8; 3rd | |
| 1977 | Hubert Boales | 19–26 | 8–7; 2nd | |
| 1978 | Johnny Suydam | 16–31 | 2–18; 6th | |
| 1979 | Johnny Suydam | 36–14 | 12–8; 3rd | |
| 1980 | Johnny Suydam | 21–20 | 7–8; 4th | |
| 1981 | Triny Rivera | 26–31–1 | 1–15; 6th | |
| 1982 | Triny Rivera | 28–26 | 11–5; 4th | |
| 1983 | Triny Rivera | 22–36 | 8–8; 3rd | |
| 1984 | Triny Rivera | 16–30 | 8–16; 4th | |
| 1985 | Triny Rivera | 21–24–1 | 7–6; 3rd | |
| 1986 | Triny Rivera | 28–24 | 9–4; 4th | |
| 1987 | Tony Robichaux | 19–28 | 7–9; 2nd | |
| 1988 | Tony Robichaux | 31–31 | 13–7; 1st | Southland Conference Champions; Stillwater, Oklahoma Regional |
| 1989 | Tony Robichaux | 35–18 | 10–7; 3rd | |
| 1990 | Tony Robichaux | 35–20 | 10–7; 3rd | |
| 1991 | Tony Robichaux | 34–18 | 4–10; 4th | |
| 1992 | Tony Robichaux | 30–22 | 9–12; 4th | |
| 1993 | Tony Robichaux | 38–23 | 14–10; 4th | Southland Tournament Champions; Austin, Texas Regional |
| 1994 | Tony Robichaux | 41–17 | 13–9; 4th | |
| 1995 | Jim Ricklefsen | 41–16 | 17–6; 2nd | |
| 1996 | Jim Ricklefsen | 23–31 | 10–20; 6th | |
| 1997 | Jim Ricklefsen | 19–32–1 | 11–19; 5th | |
| 1998 | Mike Bianco | 30–26 | 13–10; 3rd | |
| 1999 | Mike Bianco | 31–25 | 12–15; 8th | |
| 2000 | Mike Bianco | 39–20 | 20–7; 1st | Southland Regular Season Champions; Lafayette, Louisiana Regional |
| 2001 | Todd Butler | 29–25 | 12–15; 7th | |
| 2002 | Todd Butler | 30–28 | 15–12; 5th | |
| 2003 | Todd Butler | 31–30 | 12–15; 6th | Southland Tournament Champions; Houston, Texas Regional |
| 2004 | Chad Clement | 24–29 | 11–16; 7th | |
| 2005 | Chad Clement | 23–31 | 12–15; 7th | |
| 2006 | Chad Clement | 35–20 | 22–8; 1st | Southland Regular Season Champions |
| 2007 | Chad Clement/Chris Fackler | 21–35 | 17–12; 5th | |
| 2008 | Terry Burrows | 13–42 | 7–23; 10th | |
| 2009 | Terry Burrows | 21–30 | 10–22; 10th | |
| 2010 | Terry Burrows | 31–27 | 16–17; 6th | |
| 2011 | Terry Burrows | 26–30 | 14–19; 7th | |
| 2012 | Terry Burrows | 24–30 | 17–16; 5th | |
| 2013 | Terry Burrows | 23–31 | 10–17; 8th | |
| 2014 | Justin Hill | 30–28 | 17–14; 7th | |
| 2015 | Justin Hill | 32–25 | 18–12; 4th | |
| 2016 | Justin Hill | 31–25 | 15–15; 6th | |
| 2017 | Justin Hill | 37–20 | 22–8; 1st | Southland Regular Season Champions |
| 2018 | Justin Hill | 25–33 | 14–17; 6th | |
| 2019 | Justin Hill | 35–26 | 16–14; 5th | Southland Tournament Champions; Nashville, Tennessee Regional |
| 2020 | Justin Hill | 10–7 | | Season cut short due to COVID-19 pandemic |
| 2021 | Justin Hill | 32–30 | 21–18; 4th | Southland Tournament Champions; Fort Worth, Texas Regional |
| 2022 | Justin Hill | 34–23 | 15–9; 1st | Southland Regular Season Champions |

== NCAA Tournament appearances ==
McNeese has participated in the NCAA Division I baseball tournament six times.

| Year | Round | Opponent | Result |
|---|---|---|---|
| 1988 | Stillwater Regional | Oklahoma State; Southwestern Louisiana; Loyola Marymount | L 4–14; W 11–6; L 5–12 |
| 1993 | Austin Regional | Texas; Maine; Cal State-Fullerton | L 4–7; W 16–3; L 0–2 |
| 2000 | Lafayette Regional | Louisiana–Lafayette; Marist | L 5–11; L 5–6 |
| 2003 | Houston Regional | Rice; Ole Miss | L 2–3; L 1–7 |
| 2019 | Nashville Regional | Indiana State; Ohio State | L 5–6; L 8–9 (13) |
| 2021 | Fort Worth Regional | TCU; Oregon State | L 4–12; L 5–10 |

== Major League Baseball ==
McNeese State has had 57 Major League Baseball draft selections since the draft began in 1965.

| Draft | Player | Round | Pick | Team |
|---|---|---|---|---|
| 1968 | Richard Wicks | 3 | 10 | Red Sox |
| 1973 | Donald Broom | 2 | 5 | Astros |
| 1979 | Ray Fontenot | 34 | 10 | Rangers |
| 1979 | Ronnie Caldwell | 12 | 10 | Expos |
| 1980 | Shanie Dugas | 44 | 1 | Indians |
| 1981 | Thomas Dowies | 28 | 2 | Angels |
| 1986 | Kenny Miller | 28 | 7 | Phillies |
| 1986 | Jon Miller | 22 | 7 | Phillies |
| 1986 | Keith Greene | 12 | 7 | Phillies |
| 1987 | Rodney Lung | 21 | 19 | Rangers |
| 1990 | Timothy Stafford | 41 | 15 | Rangers |
| 1990 | Lance Smith | 32 | 15 | Astros |
| 1990 | Terry Burrows | 7 | 17 | Rangers |
| 1991 | Shelby Shaw | 34 | 19 | Rangers |
| 1991 | Kurt Heble | 33 | 21 | Blue Jays |
| 1991 | B.J. Waszgis | 10 | 9 | Orioles |
| 1992 | Rico Gholston | 19 | 23 | Pirates |
| 1992 | Chris Mayfield | 7 | 12 | Brewers |
| 1993 | Chris Mayfield | 12 | 4 | Phillies |
| 1994 | Kevin McNeill | 34 | 19 | Cardinals |
| 1994 | Brian Lott | 13 | 9 | Reds |
| 1994 | Bob Howry | 5 | 25 | Giants |
| 1995 | Brett Elam | 30 | 8 | Rockies |
| 1995 | Jason LeCronier | 17 | 21 | Orioles |
| 1995 | Rob Marquez | 12 | 28 | Expos |
| 1995 | Curt Lowry | 12 | 2 | Padres |
| 1995 | Danny Ardoin | 5 | 5 | Athletics |
| 1997 | David Huggins | 21 | 5 | Blue Jays |
| 1999 | Kevin Sprague | 10 | 18 | Cardinals |
| 1999 | Ben Broussard | 2 | 14 | Reds |
| 2000 | Chet Medlock | 19 | 13 | Cardinals |
| 2000 | Chris Williams | 11 | 23 | Reds |
| 2001 | Jared Gothreaux | 37 | 10 | Astros |
| 2002 | Jared Gothreaux | 16 | 491 | Astros |
| 2003 | Lance Dawkins | 20 | 6 | Cubs |
| 2005 | Jacob Marceaux | 1 | 29 | Marlins |
| 2007 | Derek Blacksher | 33 | 12 | Marlins |
| 2007 | Charles Kingrey | 22 | 18 | Cardinals |
| 2007 | Brian Cartie | 20 | 18 | Cardinals |
| 2009 | Shon Landry | 31 | 13 | Rangers |
| 2009 | Taylor Freeman | 8 | 23 | Mets |
| 2010 | Lee Orr | 40 | 12 | Reds |
| 2010 | Steven Irvine | 30 | 29 | Angels |
| 2011 | Zach Butler | 34 | 29 | Rays |
| 2011 | Lee Orr | 13 | 22 | Padres |
| 2011 | Jace Peterson | 1 | 58 | Padres |
| 2014 | Michael Clemens | 17 | 26 | Pirates |
| 2015 | Andrew Guillotte | 32 | 17 | Blue Jays |
| 2016 | Kaleb Fontenot | 21 | 23 | Rangers |
| 2017 | Collin Kober | 27 | 18 | Mariners |
| 2017 | Robbie Podorsky | 25 | 3 | Padres |
| 2018 | Shane Selman | 39 | 26 | Red Sox |
| 2018 | Austin Briggs | 29 | 9 | Athletics |
| 2018 | Grant Anderson | 21 | 14 | Mariners |
| 2019 | Bryan King | 30 | 25 | Cubs |
| 2019 | Cayne Ueckert | 27 | 25 | Cubs |
| 2019 | Carson Maxwell | 25 | 15 | Diamondbacks |
| 2019 | Shane Selman | 21 | 27 | Athletics |
| 2021 | Will Dion | 9 | 24 | Indians |
| 2022 | Cameron Foster | 14 | 13 | Mets |
| 2023 | Grant Rogers | 11 | 20 | Blue Jays |

== See also ==
- List of NCAA Division I baseball programs
