= M. L. Tigue Moore Field at Tony Robichaux Park =

Baseball park at University of Louisiana at Lafayette

M.L. 'Tigue' Moore Field at Tony Robichaux Park
- The Tigue
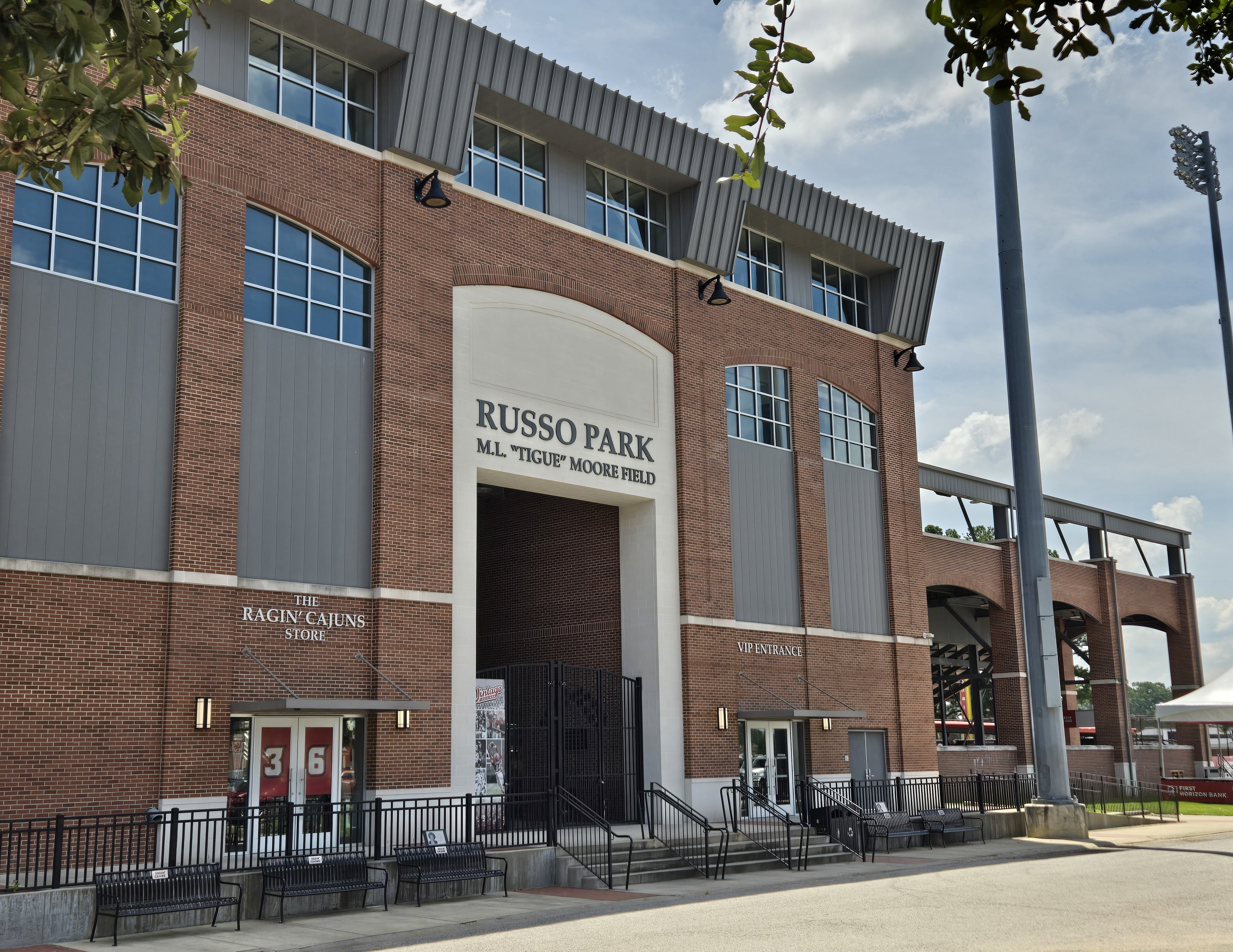
- Interactive map of M.L. 'Tigue' Moore Field at Tony Robichaux Park
- Full name: M.L. 'Tigue' Moore Field at Tony Robichaux Park
- Former names: Moore Family Field (1978–1995); M.L. 'Tigue' Moore Field (1995–2016); M.L. 'Tigue' Moore Field at Russo Park (2017–2026); M.L. 'Tigue' Moore Field at Tony Robichaux Park (2026-Present)
- Location: 121 Reinhardt Drive Lafayette, Louisiana, USA
- Coordinates: 30.213619°N 92.041801°W
- Owner: University of Louisiana at Lafayette
- Operator: University of Louisiana at Lafayette
- Capacity: 6,033
- Surface: ProGrass Synthetic Turf System
- Scoreboard: Daktronics HD video board
- Record attendance: 7,583 (April 6, 1994, vs. LSU)
- Field size: 330 feet (Left field); 375 feet (Left center field); 400 feet (Center field); 375 feet (Right center field); 330 feet (Right field)

Construction
- Opened: 1978
- Renovated: 2010, 2013, 2016
- Closed: May 22, 2016
- Reopened: February 2017
- Demolished: July 28, 2016

Tenants
- Louisiana Ragin' Cajuns baseball (1983–present); Lafayette Bullfrogs (CBL) (1998–2000)

M. L. Tigue Moore Field at Tony Robichaux Park is a ballpark located on the South Campus of the University of Louisiana at Lafayette in Lafayette, Louisiana. It was built in 1979 and currently has a capacity of 6,033, following the renovations/additions of 2016. It is the home stadium of the Louisiana Ragin' Cajuns baseball team. It was also home to the Lafayette Bullfrogs of the Central Baseball League. The facility originally named Moore Field was renamed after University of Louisiana at Lafayette benefactor, M.L. Tigue Moore's death in 1994. It is currently the largest baseball stadium in the Sun Belt Conference and one of the two largest collegiate baseball stadiums in Louisiana.

== History ==
The first game at M.L. 'Tigue' Moore Field at Tony Robichaux Park (then known as Moore Family Field) was held on March 9, 1978. Louisiana (then known as USL) faced off against LSU-New Orleans (then known as New Orleans) in which New Orleans won 7-1.

Since 1999, the Ragin Cajuns have consistently ranked in the top 50 nationally in total and average home attendance, and in recent years at or near the top 10. During the Cajuns’ 2000 College World Series run, they ranked 26th in total home attendance and hosted its first NCAA Regional. The 2014 season had a record 145,589 enter "The Tigue" throughout the team's run to the NCAA Super Regionals.

In 2016, the program sold out of season tickets for the first time in school history with 3,002 available tickets sold. Tigue Moore Field has hosted the Sun Belt Conference Baseball Tournament on five occasions (1997, 2001, 2003, 2008, and 2013), NCAA Regionals three times (2000, 2014, and 2016) and the NCAA Super Regionals once (2014)

In August 2026, the University of Louisiana Board of Supervisors approved the university's proposal to rename the facility M.L. 'Tigue' Moore Field at Tony Robichaux Park after the Cajuns' winningest head coach in program history, who passed away in 2019. The university also proposed to name the stadium club Russo Stadium Club, which was approved alongside the stadium rename.

== Renovations ==
In 2010, the field was converted from a natural surface to a full ProGrass Synthetic Turf System. Following the 2013 regular season, the scoreboard was replaced with a Daktronics HD video board and LED display.

Following the 2016 season, the grandstand area was demolished, and an entirely new structure was built in its place. Along with full integration with the existing bleachers, new and expanded restrooms and concession areas were built. Also, new terrace areas were added along the first and third baselines, as well as a new club room added in the third-floor level of the grandstand, while 10 new luxury suites were added to the fourth floor. Expanded overhangs over both the grandstand and bleacher areas were built and capacity was increased to 6,033. The projected cost was over $16 million With the renovations, the facility was renamed to the current M. L. Tigue Moore Field at Russo Park, denoting the financial contributions by the Russo family for the renovations.

== Attendance ==
Year	W	L	T	Total	Average	Nat'l rank	Conf rank	State rank
2018	0	33	0	69	6	0	0	0
2017	19	8	0	132,763	4,917	7	1	2
2016	24	7	0	129,507	4,178	12	1	2
2015	19	9	0	101,626	3,909	11	1	2
2014	32	8	0	145,589	3,831	10	1	2
2013	28	8	0	72,898	2,144	30	1	2
2012	14	13	0	56,122	2,079	30	1	3
2011	20	8	0	92,784	3,314	18	1	2
2010	23	10	0	58,803	1,897	32	1	3
2009	14	10	1	50,523	2,105	30	1	3
2008	16	12	0	46,661	1,866	31	1	3
2007	22	2	0	53,968	2,346	24	1	3
2006	23	7	0	62,736	2,091	28	1	3
2005	27	6	0	59,590	1,862	31	1	3
2004	25	6	0	44,718	1,433	38	1	3
2003	18	15	0	67,319	2,321	20	1	3
2002	20	8	0	44,948	1,729	28	1	3
2001	22	10	0	42,490	1,465	30	1	3
2000	30	3	0	46,575	1,502	26	1	3

- All rankings done by average attendance

== Gallery ==
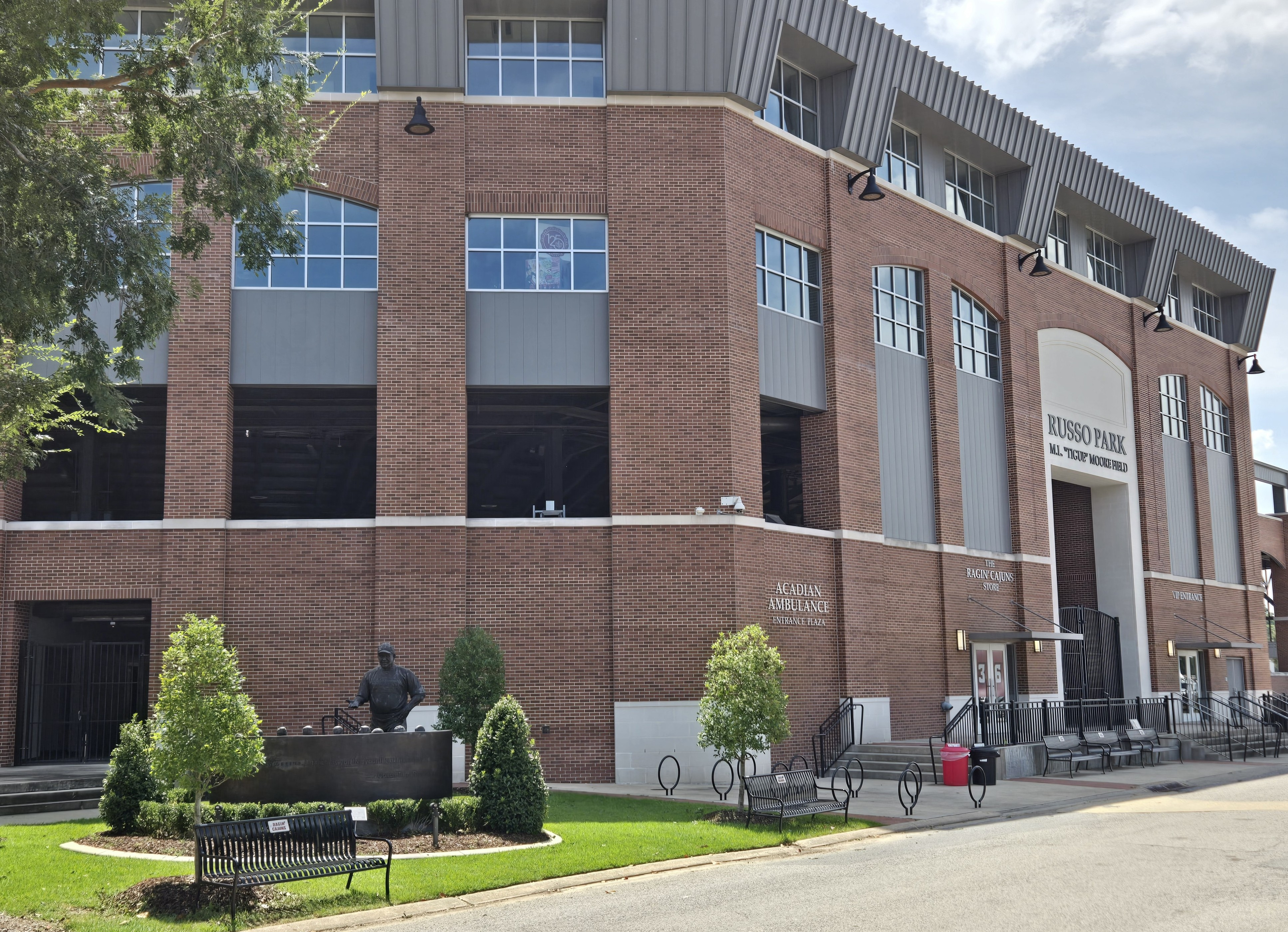
M. L. Tigue Moore Field at Tony Robichaux Park exterior

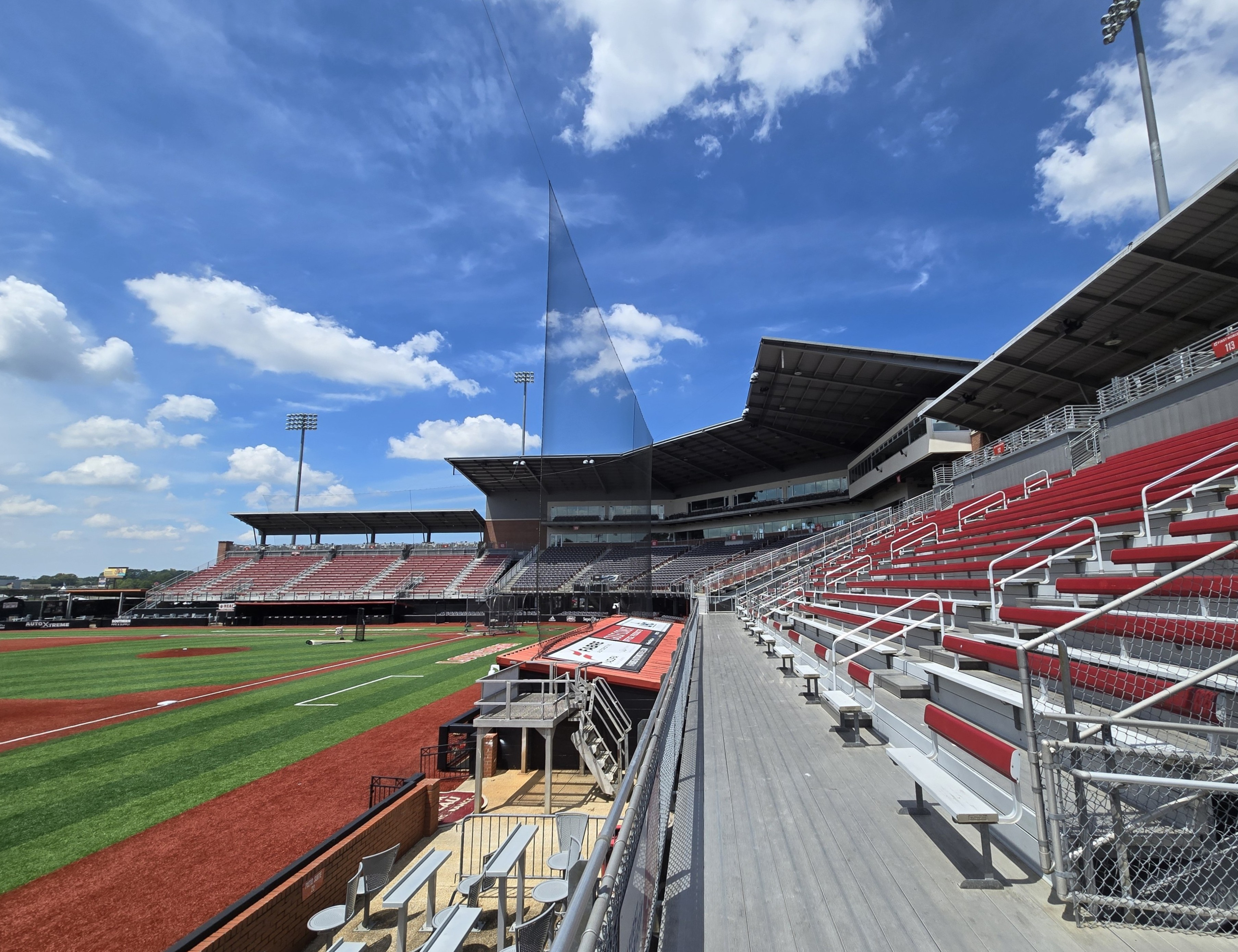
M. L. Tigue Moore Field at Tony Robichaux Park grandstand

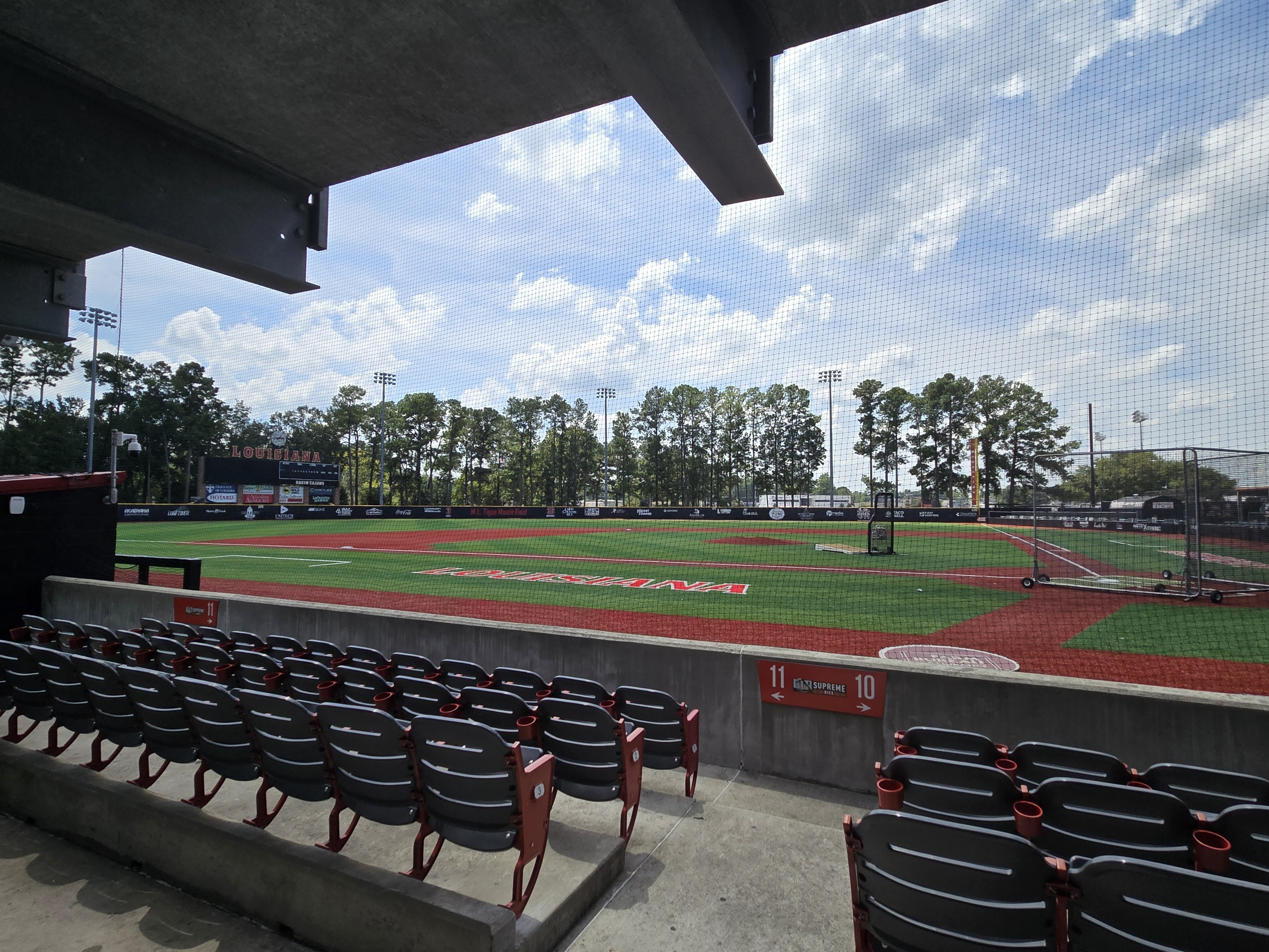
M. L. Tigue Moore Field at Tony Robichaux Park infield

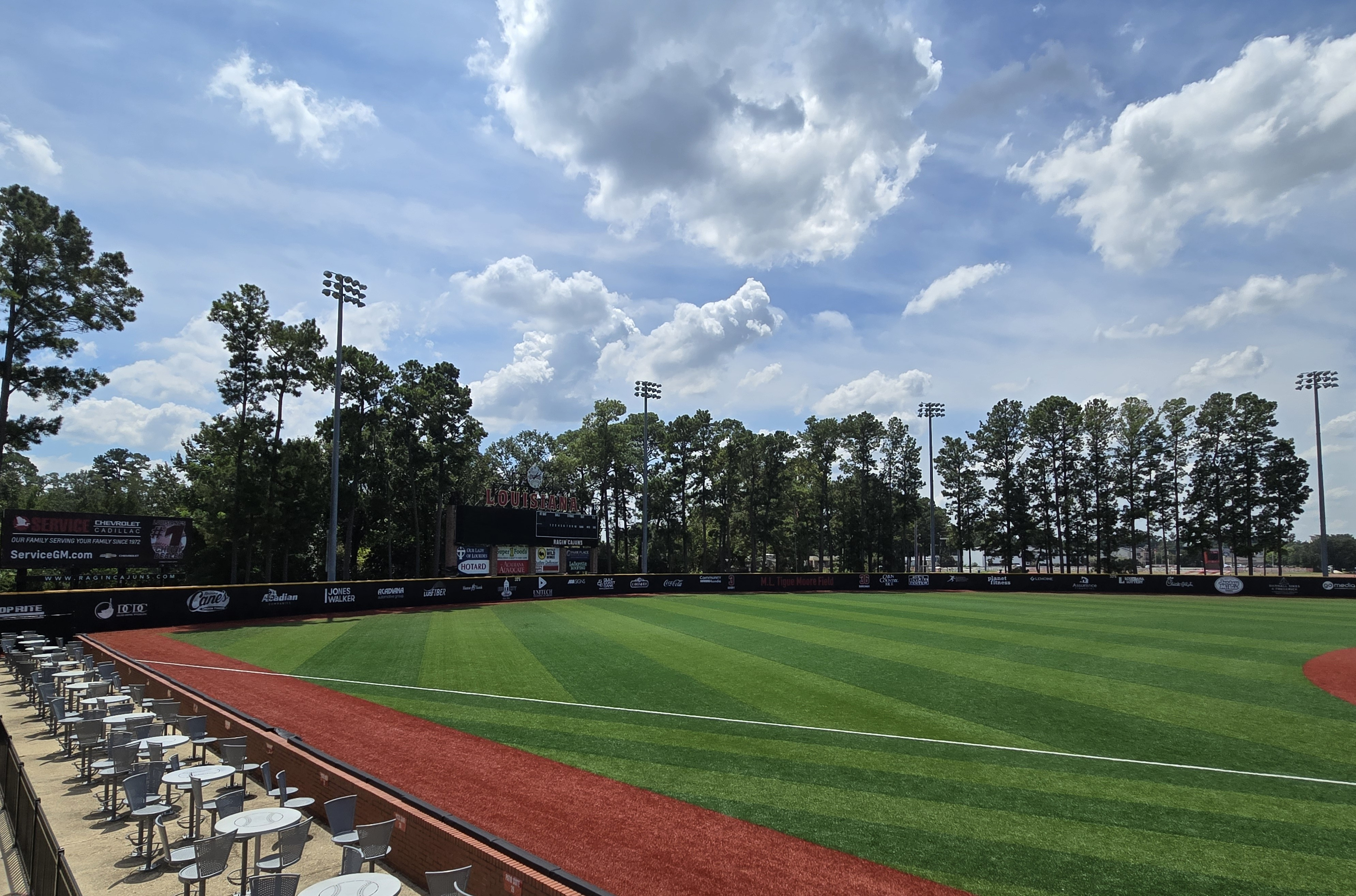
M. L. Tigue Moore Field at Tony Robichaux Park outfield

== See also ==
- List of NCAA Division I baseball venues
