= Mark Calvi =

American baseball coach (born 1969)

Current position
- Title: Head coach
- Team: South Alabama
- Conference: Sun Belt
- Record: 421–339

Biographical details
- Born: November 5, 1969 (age 56); Marco Island, Florida, U.S.

Playing career
- 1988–1991: Nova Southeastern
- Position: Catcher

Coaching career (HC unless noted)
- 1994–2004: FIU (Asst.)
- 2005–2010: South Carolina (Asst.)
- 2011: South Alabama (Asst.)
- 2012–present: South Alabama

Head coaching record
- Overall: 421–339
- Tournaments: Sun Belt: 19–10; NCAA: 7–8

Accomplishments and honors

Championships
- College World Series National Championship (2010)

Awards
- Collegiate Baseball Pitching Coach of the Year (2010); ABCA Regional Head Coach of the Year (2013); 3× Sun Belt Coach of the Year (2013, 2015, 2021); 2× Alabama Baseball Coaches Association D1 Coach of the Year (2015, 2016)

Mark P. Calvi (born November 5, 1969) is an American college baseball coach who currently serves as the head baseball coach for the South Alabama Jaguars. He was named to that position prior to the 2012 season.

== Playing career ==
Calvi lettered three times in baseball as a catcher at Nova Southeastern, and signed with the Seattle Mariners after completing his college career in 1992. He played the 1992 season with the Bellingham Mariners of the Class-A Northwest League. He then served the 1993 season as a scout for the Mariners.

== Coaching career ==
After ending his time as a scout, Calvi accepted a position on the staff of FIU, where he would remain for 11 years. He became a highly regarded pitching coach, helping to lead the Golden Panthers to seven NCAA tournaments and a Super Regional in 2001. During his time at FIU, his pitching staffs placed among the top nationally in shutouts, strikeouts, and ERA, including the 1995 campaign in which the Golden Panthers recorded 16 shutouts, tied for 6th most all-time in NCAA history.

In 2005, Calvi moved to South Carolina, where he most notably helped lead the Gamecocks to the 2010 National Championship. In that same season, he earned the Collegiate Baseball Pitching Coach of the Year Award. In 2010, Calvi's Gamecock pitching staff led USC to the national championship, ranking in the top 10 in earned run average (seventh, 3.45), strikeouts (sixth, 8.9) and hits allowed per nine innings (third, 7.48), after posting a 2.15 ERA in seven College World Series contests, which was nearly a point lower than the next best team in Omaha. The Gamecocks led the Southeastern Conference in ERA and innings pitched, but also allowed the fewest hits in the conference. Calvi's staffs again ranked among the nation's best during his time in Columbia, finishing among the top teams in ERA, strikeouts, innings pitched, hits allowed, and many other statistical categories.

In his career, which spans 21 years at the collegiate level, including an 11-season stint at fellow Sun Belt Conference member Florida International, Calvi has recruited and worked with over 40 pitchers who have either been drafted or signed with Major League Baseball teams – that includes seven who have reached the majors – along with position players Jackie Bradley Jr. and Christian Walker.

After then South Alabama head coach Steve Kittrell announced his intention to retire after the 2011 season, the Jaguars hired Calvi as associate head coach, with the intention to elevate him to head coach the following season. In his second season at the helm of South Alabama, Calvi led the Jaguars to their 14th Sun Belt Conference championship and 25th NCAA Regional appearance after recording the program's first 40-plus win season since 2003 and was named the Sun Belt Conference Coach of the Year and American Baseball Coaches Association (ABCA)/Diamond South Central Region Coach of the Year. Seven Jags earned all-conference honors in 2013, and Jordan Patterson was named the Sun Belt Conference Player of the Year becoming just the sixth Jaguar in the program's history to earn the honor. Patterson and Kyle Bartsch also earned ABCA South/Central all-region honors. Bartsch, Patterson, Nolan Earley and Dylan Stamey were selected in the 2013 Major League Baseball First-Year Player Draft. Patterson (4th round, 109th pick) became South Alabama's highest draftee since Adam Lind was taken by the Toronto Blue Jays in the third round of the 2004 MLB Draft. Calvi led USA to its 15th Sun Belt crown in 2015 en route to his second SBC Ron Maestri Coach of the Year award. He was also named the Large College Division-Division I Coach of the Year by the Alabama Baseball Coaches Association. Right-hander Kevin Hill was named the Sun Belt Conference Pitcher of the Year, and became the program's 27th All-American at the conclusion of the season. Center fielder Cole Billingsley was named first-team all-SBC, and received a 2015 American Baseball Coaches Association/Rawlings Division I Gold Glove Award as one of three outfielders named to the team. Right-hander Ben Taylor also earned first-team all-SBC honors as a relief pitcher, and was selected in the seventh round of the 2015 MLB Draft by the Boston Red Sox.

== Head coaching record ==
Record table
| Season | Team | Overall | Conference | Standing | Postseason |
|---|---|---|---|---|---|
South Alabama Jaguars (Sun Belt Conference) (2012–present)
| 2012 | South Alabama | 23–34 | 15–15 | T–4th | Sun Belt tournament (Note: The top 8 finishers of the Sun Belt's 10 teams qualified for the tournament in 2012.) |
| 2013 | South Alabama | 43–20 | 20–10 | T–1st | NCAA Regional |
| 2014 | South Alabama | 22–33 | 11–18 | T–6th | Sun Belt tournament (Note: The top 8 finishers of the Sun Belt's 10 teams qualified for the tournament in 2014.) |
| 2015 | South Alabama | 37–20 | 19–9 | 1st | Sun Belt tournament (Note: The top 8 finishers of the Sun Belt's 10 teams qualified for the tournament in 2015.) |
| 2016 | South Alabama | 42–22 | 21–9 | T–1st | NCAA Regional |
| 2017 | South Alabama | 40–21 | 22–8 | 2nd (East) | NCAA Regional |
| 2018 | South Alabama | 32–25 | 18–11 | T-3rd (East) | Sun Belt tournament |
| 2019 | South Alabama | 30–26 | 16–14 | T-3rd (East) | Sun Belt tournament |
| 2020 | South Alabama | 8–10 | 0–0 | (East) | Season canceled due to COVID-19 |
| 2021 | South Alabama | 36–22 | 15–9 | 1st (East) | NCAA Regional |
| 2022 | South Alabama | 31–22 | 17–13 | 5th | |
| 2023 | South Alabama | 23–31 | 11–19 | 11th | |
| 2024 | South Alabama | 31–25 | 14–16 | 4th (West) | Sun Belt tournament |
| 2025 | South Alabama | 23–28 | 12–18 | 11th | |
| South Alabama: | | 421–339 | 211–169 | | |
| Total: | | 421–339 | | | |
National champion Postseason invitational champion Conference regular season champion Conference regular season and conference tournament champion Division regular season champion Division regular season and conference tournament champion Conference tournament champion
