= 1987 Sun Belt Conference men's soccer season =

- League: NCAA Division I
- Sport: Soccer
- Duration: August 1987 – November 1987

Regular Season
- Season champions: East: Old Dominion; West: South Alabama

Tournament
- Champions: Old Dominion
- Runners-up: South Alabama

Sun Belt Conference men's soccer seasons
- ← 1986 1988 →

1987 Sun Belt Conference men's soccer standings
	Conf.					Overall
Team	W		L		T	W		L		T
East
Old Dominion	2	–	0	–	1	14	–	3	–	2
Jacksonville	2	–	0	–	1	6	–	9	–	3
Charlotte	1	–	2	–	0	8	–	7	–	2
VCU	0	–	3	–	0	11	–	7	–	2
West
South Alabama	3	–	0	–	0	19	–	2	–	1
South Florida	2	–	1	–	0	8	–	8	–	2
WKU	0	–	2	–	1	13	–	5	–	2
UAB	0	–	2	–	1	6	–	7	–	2
+ - Invited to the NCAA Division I Men's Soccer Championship; Rankings from NSCAA

The 1987 Sun Belt Conference men's soccer season was the 11th season of men's soccer in the conference.

== Changes from 1986 ==
- This was the first season that a regular season trophy was awarded.

== Teams ==
Team	Location
East
Charlotte 49ers	Charlotte, North Carolina
Jacksonville Dolphins	Jacksonville, Florida
Old Dominion Monarchs	Norfolk, Virginia
VCU Rams	Richmond, Virginia
West
South Alabama Jaguars	Mobile, Alabama
South Florida Bulls	Tampa, Florida
UAB Blazers	Birmingham, Alabama
Western Kentucky Hilltoppers	Bowling Green, Kentucky

== Postseason ==
=== Sun Belt Tournament ===
The tournament was held in Norfolk, Virginia.

Semifinals; November 11
South Alabama	3
Jacksonville	0
Old Dominion	2
South Florida	0

Championship; November 13
South Alabama	0
Old Dominion	1
Third place
South Florida	2
Jacksonville	0

== All-Sun Belt awards and teams ==
1987 Sun Belt Men's Soccer Individual Awards
Award	Recipient(s)
Coach of the Year	Roy Patton, South Alabama

1987 Sun Belt Men's Soccer All-Conference Teams
First Team	Second Team
David Udrescu (South Alabama); Chris Haywood (Old Dominion); John Dugan (VCU); Thor Geirsson (South Alabama); Alan Anderson (South Florida); Tony Pagano (South Alabama); Paul Cann (Old Dominion); Kevin Walsh (Old Dominion); Giles Hooper (South Florida); Todd Rittenberry (Western Kentucky); Jon Parker (Old Dominion)	Sigfus Karason (South Alabama); Michael Bates (South Florida); David Cooper (UNC Charlotte); R.C. Campagnolo (South Florida); Bill Buerger (UNC Charlotte); Sam Hinson (Jacksonville); Orlin Weise (VCU); Pat Moriarty (VCU); Tim Updike (Jacksonville); Richard Butler (UAB); Eduardo Carvacho (South Alabama); George McDermott (Jacksonville)

== See also ==
- 1987 NCAA Division I men's soccer season
- 1987 Sun Belt Conference Men's Soccer Tournament
- 1987 Sun Belt Conference women's soccer season
