= 2012 Sun Belt Conference baseball tournament =

- Teams: 8
- Format: 2 division round robin and championship game
- Finals site: Bowling Green Ballpark; Bowling Green, KY
- Champions: Louisiana–Monroe (1st title)
- Winning coach: Jeff Schexnaider (1st title)
- MVP: Wil Browning (Louisiana–Monroe)

2012 Sun Belt Conference baseball standings
	Conf.				Overall
Team	W		L	PCT	W		L	PCT
Florida Atlantic ‍†‍‍^{y}	19	–	8	.704	32	–	22	.593
Arkansas State ‍‍‍	19	–	9	.679	34	–	23	.596
FIU ‍‍‍	15	–	14	.517	31	–	26	.544
South Alabama ‍‍‍	15	–	15	.500	23	–	34	.404
Louisiana–Monroe ‍‍‡‍^{y}	15	–	15	.500	32	–	30	.516
Troy ‍‍‍	14	–	16	.467	28	–	30	.483
Middle Tennessee ‍‍‍	14	–	16	.467	31	–	28	.525
Western Kentucky ‍‍‍	13	–	17	.433	25	–	33	.431
Arkansas–Little Rock ‍‍‍	12	–	18	.400	26	–	28	.481
Louisiana–Lafayette ‍‍‍	11	–	19	.367	23	–	30	.434
† – Conference champion ‡ – Tournament champion y – Invited to the NCAA tournament As of June 30, 2012; Rankings from Collegiate Baseball

The 2012 Sun Belt Conference baseball tournament was held at Bowling Green Ballpark in Bowling Green, KY from May 23 to May 27, 2012. The tournament continued the round robin format from the previous season. Fifth seeded Louisiana–Monroe won their first tournament championship and earned the Sun Belt Conference's automatic bid to the 2012 NCAA Division I baseball tournament.

== Seeding and format ==
The top eight teams (based on conference results) from the conference earn invites to the tournament. Teams were divided into two four-team pods for round-robin play. The teams with the best record in each pod then met in a championship game. If multiple teams shared the best record, head-to-head matchups were used as the first tiebreaker.

Team	W	L	PCT	GB	Seed
Florida Atlantic	19	8	.704	–	1
Arkansas State	19	9	.679	.5	2
FIU	15	14	.517	5	3
South Alabama	15	15	.500	5.5	4
Louisiana–Monroe	15	15	.500	5.5	5
Troy	14	16	.467	6.5	6
Middle Tennessee	14	16	.467	6.5	7
Western Kentucky	13	17	.433	7.5	8
Arkansas–Little Rock	12	18	.400	8.5	–
Louisiana–Lafayette	11	19	.367	9.5	–

== Results ==
	Division A	FAU	So Ala	ULM	WKU	Overall
1	Florida Atlantic		L 4–5	L 7–9	W 4–3	1–2
4	South Alabama	W 5–4		L 4–7	W 5–3	2–1
5	Louisiana–Monroe	W 9–7	W 7–4		L 4–7	2–1
8	Western Kentucky	L 3–4	L 3–5	W 7–4		1–2

	Division B	Ark St	FIU	Troy	MTSU	Overall
2	Arkansas State		W 12–4	L 3–8	W 12–1	2–1
3	FIU	L 4–12		L 3–8	L 6–12	0–3
6	Troy	W 8–3	W 8–3		L 5–8	2–1
7	Middle Tennessee	L 1–12	W 12–6	W 8–5		2–1

Finals
A	Louisiana–Monroe	4
B	Arkansas State	2

== All-Tournament Team ==
The following players were named to the All-Tournament Team.

Pos.	Name	School
P	Nate Hill	Troy
INF	Mike Albaladejo	Florid Atlantic
1B	Justin Guidry	Middle Tennessee
3B	Danny Collins	Troy
P	Andrew Fonzi	South Alabama
OF	Jared Andreoli	Western Kentucky
OF	Nathan Burns	FIU
P	Tyler Ray	Troy
OF	Michael Faulkner	Arkansas State
3B	Claude Johnson	Arkansas State
P	Jacob Lee	Arkansas State
2B	Caleb Clowers	Louisiana–Monroe
3B	Judd Edwards	Louisiana–Monroe

=== Most Outstanding Player ===
Wil Browning was named Most Outstanding Player. Browning was a pitcher for Louisiana–Monroe.
