= 2017 Coastal Carolina Chanticleers baseball team =

American college baseball season

2017 Coastal Carolina Chanticleers baseball

Sun Belt regular season champions Sun Belt East Division champion
- Conference: Sun Belt Conference
- East Division
- Record: 37–19–1 (20–7–1 SBC)
- Head coach: Gary Gilmore (22nd season)
- Assistant coaches: Kevin Schnall (14th season); Drew Thomas (11th season); Matt Schilling (10th season)
- Home stadium: Springs Brooks Stadium

2017 Sun Belt Conference baseball standings
	Conf.						Overall
Team	W		L		T	PCT	W		L		T	PCT
East Division
Coastal Carolina^{x}^{†} ‍‍‍	22	–	7	–	1	.750	37	–	19	–	1	.658
No. 26 South Alabama^{‡}^{y} ‍‍‍	22	–	8	–	0	.733	40	–	21	–	0	.656
Georgia Southern ‍‍‍	18	–	12	–	0	.600	38	–	21	–	0	.644
Troy ‍‍‍	16	–	14	–	0	.533	31	–	25	–	0	.554
Georgia State ‍‍‍	10	–	20	–	0	.333	22	–	33	–	0	.400
Appalachian State ‍‍‍	8	–	22	–	0	.267	19	–	36	–	0	.345
West Division
UT Arlington^{x} ‍‍‍	20	–	10	–	0	.667	30	–	25	–	0	.545
Louisiana–Lafayette ‍‍‍	19	–	10	–	1	.650	35	–	21	–	1	.623
Arkansas State ‍‍‍	13	–	16	–	0	.448	28	–	27	–	0	.509
Texas State ‍‍‍	13	–	17	–	0	.433	29	–	30	–	0	.492
Little Rock ‍‍‍	11	–	18	–	0	.379	21	–	34	–	0	.382
Louisiana–Monroe ‍‍‍	6	–	24	–	0	.200	12	–	43	–	0	.218
x – Division champion † – Conference champion ‡ – Tournament champion y – Invited to the NCAA tournament Rankings from Collegiate Baseball

The 2017 Coastal Carolina Chanticleers baseball team represented Coastal Carolina University in the 2017 NCAA Division I baseball season. The Chanticleers played their home games at Springs Brooks Stadium. This was the first season of competition in the Sun Belt after transitioning from the Big South. While the Chanticleers were successful in their inaugural Sun Belt season, winning a regular season title, they failed to return to the NCAA tournament after winning the College World Series the previous season.

== Roster ==
2017 Coastal Carolina Chanticleers roster
Pitchers: 2 Zach Hopeck - Junior; 18 Alex Cunningham - Senior; 20 Mitchell Mikes - Freshman; 25 Jason Bilous - Sophomore; 29 Rafi Vazquez - Freshman; 31 Bobby Holmes - Junior; 32 Anthony Veneziano - Freshman; 33 Will Latcham - Junior; 34 Cole Schaefer - Senior; 37 Patrick Orlando - Freshman; 41 Andrew Beckwith - Senior; 47 Austin Kitchen - Sophomore; Catchers: 13 Peyton Isaacson - Sophomore; 16 Matt Beaird - Junior; 21 Dax Roper - Freshman; 36 Kyle Skeels - Redshirt Freshman	Infielders: 1 Cory Wood - Freshman; 6 Cameron Pearcey - Sophomore; 7 Keaton Weisz - Sophomore; 8 Wood Myers - Junior; 11 Jordan Gore - Redshirt Junior; 19 Kevin Woodall Jr. - Junior; 26 Seth Lancaster - Junior; 27 L. T. Struble - Junior; 38 Cameron Remalia - Freshman; Outfielders: 3 Josh Crump - Junior; 5 Kieton Rivers - Sophomore; 17 Billy Cooke - Junior; 23 Turner Buis - Junior; 24 Dalton Ewing - Junior

=== Coaching staff ===
2017 Coastal Carolina Chanticleers coaching staff
- Gary Gilmore – Head Coach – 22nd year
- Kevin Schnall – Associate head coach/Catchers Coach/recruiting coordinator – 14th year
- Drew Thomas – Assistant Head Coach/Pitching Coach – 11th year
- Matt Schilling – Volunteer Assistant Coach – 10th year

== Schedule and results ==
Coastal Carolina announced its 2017 baseball schedule on November 16, 2016. The 2017 schedule consisted of 34 home and 23 away games in the regular season. The Chanticleers hosted Sun Belts foes Appalachian State, Arkansas State, Georgia Southern, Louisiana–Lafayette, and Troy and traveled to Georgia State, Louisiana–Monroe, South Alabama, Texas–Arlington, and Texas State.

The 2017 Sun Belt Conference Championship was hosted by Georgia Southern in Statesboro, Georgia. Coastal Carolina captured the regular season Sun Belt championship, but were eliminated by Texas State in the quarterfinals of the conference tournament following a 5–7 defeat. Falling to 37–19–1, the Chanticleers were not selected to participate in the NCAA tournament.

Legend
	Coastal Carolina win
	Coastal Carolina loss
	Postponement/Cancelation/Suspensions
**Bold**	Coastal Carolina team member

2017 Coastal Carolina Chanticleers baseball game log
Regular season (37–18–1)

February (4–5)
Date	Opponent	Rank	Site	Score	Win	Loss	Save	TV	Attendance	Overall record	SBC record
Caravelle Resort's Baseball at the Beach
Feb. 17	Richmond	No. 19	Springs Brooks Stadium • Conway, SC	**W** 8–5	**Cunningham** (1–0)	Baker (0–1)	None		3,280	1–0	
Feb. 18	Western Carolina	No. 19	Springs Brooks Stadium • Conway, SC	**L** 4–5	Sammons (1–0)	**Kitchen** (0–1)	None		3,777	1–1	–
Feb. 19	James Madison	No. 19	Springs Brooks Stadium • Conway, SC	**L** 3–11	2,488	Colon (1–0)	**Vazquez** (0–1)	None		1–2	
Feb. 20	St. John's	No. 27	Springs Brooks Stadium • Conway, SC	**L** 4–7 (10 inns)	French (1–0)	**Holmes** (0–1)	None		1,845	1–3	
Feb. 22	College of Charleston	No. 27	Springs Brooks Stadium • Conway, SC	**W** 16–7	**Veneziano** (1–0)	Kuhn (1–1)	None		2,019	2–3	
Caravelle Resort Tournament
Feb. 24	Ball State	No. 27	Springs Brooks Stadium • Conway, SC	**W** 1–0	**Cunningham** (2–0)	Butler (0–1)	**Holmes** (1)		1,967	3–3	
Feb. 25	West Virginia	No. 27	Springs Brooks Stadium • Conway, SC	**L** 9–22	Kearns (1–0)	**Beckwith** (0–1)	None		2,319	3–4	
Feb. 26	George Mason	No. 27	Springs Brooks Stadium • Conway, SC	**W** 9–8	**Orlando** (1–0)	Tobin (0–1)	None		1,785	4–4	
Feb. 27	West Virginia		Springs Brooks Stadium • Conway, SC	**L** 1–4	Dotson (2–0)	**Hopeck** (0–1)	Potock (1)		1,553	4–5	–

March (13–5)
Date	Opponent	Rank	Site	Score	Win	Loss	Save	TV	Attendance	Overall record	SBC record
Mar. 1	at UNC Wilmington		Brooks Field • Wilmington, NC	**W** 4–1	**Holmes** (1–1)	Magestro (0–2)	**Kitchen** (1)		1,443	5–5	
Tidelands Health Classic
Mar. 3	San Francisco		Springs Brooks Stadium • Conway, SC	**W** 7–5	**Schaefer** (1–0)	Steele (0–1)	**Kitchen** (2)		1,388	6–5	
Mar. 4	Winthrop		Springs Brooks Stadium • Conway, SC	**W** 8–3	**Kitchen** (1–1)	Harris (0–2)	**Vazquez** (1)		1,722	7–5	
Mar. 4	Albany		Springs Brooks Stadium • Conway, SC	**W** 14–0 (7 inns)	**Bilous** (1–0)	McLean (0–1)	None		1,327	8–5	
Mar. 5	San Francisco		Springs Brooks Stadium • Conway, SC	**W** 6–1	**Hopeck** (1–1)	Granoff (1–2)	None		1,425	9–5	
Mar. 8	Wake Forest	No. 23	Springs Brooks Stadium • Conway, SC	**L** 8–13	Bach (1–0)	**Veneziano** (1–1)	None		1,451	9–6	
Mar. 10	Illinois	No. 23	Springs Brooks Stadium • Conway, SC	**L** 6–7	Sefcik (1–2)	**Holmes** (1–2)	Schmitt (1)		1,411	9–7	
Mar. 11	Illinois	No. 23	Springs Brooks Stadium • Conway, SC	**W** 3–2	**Kitchen** (2–1)	Schmitt (0–1)	None		1,411	10–7	
Mar. 12	Illinois	No. 23	Springs Brooks Stadium • Conway, SC	**W** 6–0	**Bilous** (2–0)	Sefcik (1–2)	None		1,554	11–7	
Mar. 17	at Texas State		Bobcat Ballpark • San Marcos, TX	**L** 4–5 (14 inns)	Walden (4–0)	**Orlando** (1–1)	None		1,478	11–8	0–1
Mar. 18	at Texas State		Bobcat Ballpark • San Marcos, TX	**W** 4–3	**Beckwith** (1–1)	Courville (0–2)	**Latcham** (1)		1,621	12–8	1–1
Mar. 19	at Texas State		Bobcat Ballpark • San Marcos, TX	**L** 7–10	Theriot (1–0)	**Hopeck** (1–2)	None		1,360	12–9	1–2
Mar. 24	Arkansas State		Springs Brooks Stadium • Conway, SC	**W** 5–0	**Cunningham** (3–0)	Ayers (2–3)	None		1,744	13–9	2–2
Mar. 25	Arkansas State		Springs Brooks Stadium • Conway, SC	**W** 11–6	**Beckwith** (2–1)	Culbertson (2–2)	**Latcham** (2)		1,691	14–9	3–2
Mar. 26	Arkansas State		Springs Brooks Stadium • Conway, SC	**W** 6–1	**Bilous** (3–0)	Mitzel (0–2)	None		1,748	15–9	4–2
Mar. 28	at No. 7 North Carolina		Boshamer Stadium • Chapel Hill, NC	**L** 6–7	Daniels (3–0)	**Kitchen** (2–2)	None		1,925	15–10	
Mar. 29	UNC Wilmington		Springs Brooks Stadium • Conway, SC	**W** 13–2	**Veneziano** (2–1)	Sharpe (0–1)	**Vazquez** (2)		1,577	16–10	
Mar. 31	at Georgia State		Georgia State Baseball Complex • Decatur, GA	**W** 4–0	**Cunningham** (4–0)	Gaddis (3–2)	None		348	17–10	5–2

April (10–6–1)
Date	Opponent	Rank	Site	Score	Win	Loss	Save	TV	Attendance	Overall record	SBC record
April 1	at Georgia State		Georgia State Baseball Complex • Decatur, GA	**W** 8–5	**Beckwith** (3–1)	Conley (2–5)	None		361	18–10	6–2
April 2	at Georgia State		Georgia State Baseball Complex • Decatur, GA	**W** 17–0 (7 inns)	**Hopeck** (2–2)	Baker (0–4)	None		335	19–10	7–2
April 7	Louisiana–Lafayette	No. 26	Springs Brooks Stadium • Conway, SC	**L** 0–1	Leger (6–1)	**Cunningham** (4–1)	Moore (7)		2,191	19–11	7–3
April 8	Louisiana–Lafayette	No. 26	Springs Brooks Stadium • Conway, SC	**W** 9–8	**Beckwith** (4–1)	Moore (0–1)	None		2,278	20–11	8–3
April 9	Louisiana–Lafayette	No. 26	Springs Brooks Stadium • Conway, SC	**T** 7–7 (9 inns)					2,107	20–11–1	8–3–1
April 11	at No. 22 Wake Forest	No. 26	Gene Hooks Field • Winston-Salem, NC	**L** 9–19	Hearn (1–0)	**Vazquez** (0–2)	None		1,210	20–12–1	
April 13	at South Alabama	No. 26	Eddie Stanky Field • Mobile, AL	**W** 4–3 (10 inns)	**Holmes** (2–2)	Peacock (0–2)	None		2,019	21–12–1	9–3–1
April 14	at South Alabama	No. 26	Eddie Stanky Field • Mobile, AL	**W** 11–9	**Beckwith** (5–1)	Geyer (0–2)	**Kitchen** (3)		2,276	22–12–1	10–3–1
April 15	at South Alabama	No. 26	Eddie Stanky Field • Mobile, AL	**L** 3–4	Eiland (1–0)	**Veneziano** (2–2)	None		1,681	22–13–1	10–4–1
April 19	at College of Charleston	No. 29	Patriot's Point • Mount Pleasant, SC	**W** 8–5	**Latcham** (1–0)	McKinley (0–4)	**Beckwith** (1)		654	23–13–1	
April 21	Georgia Southern	No. 29	Springs Brooks Stadium • Conway, SC	**W** 6–5	**Cunningham** (5–1)	Condra–Bogan (4–1)	**Holmes** (2)		1,970	24–13–1	11–4–1
April 22	Georgia Southern	No. 29	Springs Brooks Stadium • Conway, SC	**L** 6–7 (10 inns)	Hughes (5–1)	**Holmes** (2–3)	None		1,858	24–14-1	11-5-1
April 23	Georgia Southern	No. 29	Springs Brooks Stadium • Conway, SC	**L** 2–3	Simmons (4–0)	**Bilous** (3–1)	Hughes (6)		1,678	24–15-1	11-6-1
April 28	at The Citadel		Riley Park • Charleston, SC	**W** 9–6	**Holmes** (3–3)	Morris (0–2)	None		616	25–15-1	
April 28	Troy		Springs Brooks Stadium • Conway, SC	**L** 0–4	Crane (4–1)	**Cunningham** (5–2)	Gill (5)		1,492	25–16-1	11-7-1
April 29	Troy		Springs Brooks Stadium • Conway, SC	**W** 5–4	**Holmes** (4–3)	Skinner (3–4)	None		1,470	26–16–1	12–7–1
April 30	Troy		Springs Brooks Stadium • Conway, SC	**W** 11–8	**Latcham** (2–0)	Crook (5–2)	**Holmes** (3)		1,616	27–16–1	13–7–1

May (10–2)
Date	Opponent	Rank	Site	Score	Win	Loss	Save	TV	Attendance	Overall record	SBC record
May 5	at Louisiana–Monroe		Warhawk Field • Monroe, LA	**W** 7–5 (12 inns)	**Latcham** (3–0)	Herrera (1–4)	None		1,015	28–16–1	14–7–1
May 6	at Louisiana–Monroe		Warhawk Field • Monroe, LA	**W** 10–5	**Beckwith** (6–1)	Beal (3–6)	**Kitchen** (4)		1,073	29–16–1	15–7–1
May 7	at Louisiana–Monroe		Warhawk Field • Monroe, LA	**W** 8–1	**Hopeck** (3–2)	Morrison (0–1)	None		1,087	30–16–1	16–7–1
May 9	UNC Wilmington	No. 29	Springs Brooks Stadium • Conway, SC	**W** 13–6	**Holmes** (5–3)	Gesell (0–1)	None		1,717	31–16–1	–
May 10	College of Charleston	No. 29	Springs Brooks Stadium • Conway, SC	**L** 5–6	Ocker (3–1)	**Schaefer** (1–1)	None		1,578	30–17–1	
May 12	at No. 24 UT Arlington	No. 29	Clay Gould Ballpark • Arlington, TX	**W** 5–4	**Cunningham** (6–2)	Simmons (7–3)	**Latcham** (3)		939	32–17–1	17–7–1
May 13	at No. 24 UT Arlington	No. 29	Clay Gould Ballpark • Arlington, TX	**W** 4–1	**Beckwith** (7–1)	James (0–2)	**Kitchen** (5)		505	33–17–1	18–7–1
May 14	at No. 24 UT Arlington	No. 29	Clay Gould Ballpark • Arlington, TX	**W** 5–0	**Hopeck** (4–2)	Hernandez (6–1)	None		374	34–17–1	19–7–1
May 16	at No. 14 Clemson	No. 24	Doug Kingsmore Stadium • Clemson, SC	**L** 8–11	Gilliam (3–1)	**Bilous** (3–2)	None		5,138	34–18–1	
May 18	Appalachian State	No. 24	Springs Brooks Stadium • Conway, SC	**W** 5–0	**Cunningham** (7–2)	Schaeffer (1–2)	None		1,278	35–18–1	20–7–1
May 19	Appalachian State	No. 24	Springs Brooks Stadium • Conway, SC	**W** 4–2	**Beckwith** (8–1)	Schmid (6–7)	**Kitchen** (6)		1,838	36–18–1	21–7–1
May 20	Appalachian State	No. 24	Springs Brooks Stadium • Conway, SC	**W** 6–2	**Hopeck** (5–2)	Watts (2–8)	**Latcham** (4)		1,910	37–18–1	22–7–1

Postseason (0–1)

SBC Tournament (0–1)
Date	Opponent	Rank	Site	Score	Win	Loss	Save	TV	Attendance	Overall record	SBCT Record
May 26	vs. Texas State	No. 18	J. I. Clements Stadium • Statesboro, GA	**L** 5–7	Reich (3–5)	**Beckwith** (8–2)	Pagano (1)		578	37–19–1	0–1

- Rankings are based on the team's current ranking in the Collegiate Baseball poll.
