= 1988 Sun Belt Conference men's soccer season =

- League: NCAA Division I
- Sport: Soccer
- Duration: August 1988 – November 1988

Regular Season
- Season champions: East: Charlotte; West: South Alabama

Tournament
- Champions: South Florida
- Runners-up: Old Dominion

Sun Belt Conference men's soccer seasons
- ← 1987 1989 →

1988 Sun Belt Conference men's soccer standings
| | Conf. | | | | | Overall |
| Team | W | | L | | T | W | | L | | T |
|---|---|---|---|---|---|---|---|---|---|---|
East
| Charlotte | 3 | – | 0 | – | 0 | 10 | – | 4 | – | 3 |
| Old Dominion | 2 | – | 1 | – | 0 | 11 | – | 5 | – | 3 |
| VCU | 1 | – | 2 | – | 0 | 6 | – | 9 | – | 2 |
| Jacksonville | 0 | – | 3 | – | 0 | 7 | – | 10 | – | 1 |
West
| South Alabama | 3 | – | 0 | – | 0 | 17 | – | 4 | – | 1 |
| South Florida | 2 | – | 1 | – | 0 | 9 | – | 7 | – | 2 |
| UAB | 1 | – | 2 | – | 0 | 7 | – | 8 | – | 1 |
| WKU | 0 | – | 3 | – | 0 | 7 | – | 11 | – | 1 |
+ - Invited to the NCAA Division I Men's Soccer Championship; Rankings from NSCAA

The 1988 Sun Belt Conference men's soccer season was the 12th season of men's soccer in the conference.

== Teams ==
| Team | Location |
East
| Charlotte 49ers | Charlotte, North Carolina |
| Jacksonville Dolphins | Jacksonville, Florida |
| Old Dominion Monarchs | Norfolk, Virginia |
| VCU Rams | Richmond, Virginia |
West
| South Alabama Jaguars | Mobile, Alabama |
| South Florida Bulls | Tampa, Florida |
| UAB Blazers | Birmingham, Alabama |
| Western Kentucky Hilltoppers | Bowling Green, Kentucky |

== Postseason ==
=== Sun Belt Tournament ===
The tournament was held in Norfolk, Virginia.

Semifinals
South Florida | 2
Charlotte | 1
Old Dominion | 4
South Alabama | 1

Championship
South Florida | 1 (Note: South Florida won on penalty kicks)
Old Dominion | 1
Third place
South Alabama | 3
Charlotte | 0

== All-Sun Belt awards and teams ==
1988 Sun Belt Men's Soccer Individual Awards
| Award | Recipient(s) |
| Coach of the Year | Bob Warming, Charlotte |

1988 Sun Belt Men's Soccer All-Conference Teams
| First Team | Second Team |
| Andri Marteinsson (South Alabama); Chris Haywood (Old Dominion); Sean Crowley (Old Dominion); Michael Bates (South Florida); John Dugan (VCU); Sigfus Karason (South Alabama); Thor Geirsson (South Alabama); Chris Pfau (Old Dominion); Ricky Riera-Gomez (Charlotte); Ian Gruno (Charlotte); Eduardo Carvacho (South Alabama) | John King (South Florida); Orlin Weise (VCU); Paul Cann (Old Dominion); Jeff Paciolla (Charlotte); Rich Biondi (South Florida); Chris Grecco (WKU); Giles Hooper (South Florida); Craig Fossett (South Florida); Pat Moriarty (VCU); Richard Butler (UAB); Mike Coons (South Florida); Aidan Heaney (Charlotte); Robert RoJhan (Jacksonville) |

== See also ==
- 1988 NCAA Division I men's soccer season
- 1988 Sun Belt Conference Men's Soccer Tournament
- 1988 Sun Belt Conference women's soccer season
