= Mel Lucas =

Coaching career (HC unless noted)
- 1961–1964: Troy
- 1965–1968: South Alabama

Administrative career (AD unless noted)
- 1964–1980: South Alabama

Mel Lucas is a former college baseball coach and college administrator. He served as head coach of the Troy Trojans baseball team before being hired as the first athletic director at South Alabama, then a new university in Mobile, Alabama. He served as the school's first baseball coach for four seasons before hiring former major leaguer Eddie Stanky in order to focus on his growing administrative duties. Lucas was instrumental in forming the Sun Belt Conference and was a central figure in the growth of the Jaguars athletic programs. He was inducted into the school's hall of fame in 1989.
