= Bowling Green Ballpark =

Baseball stadium in Bowling Green, KY, US

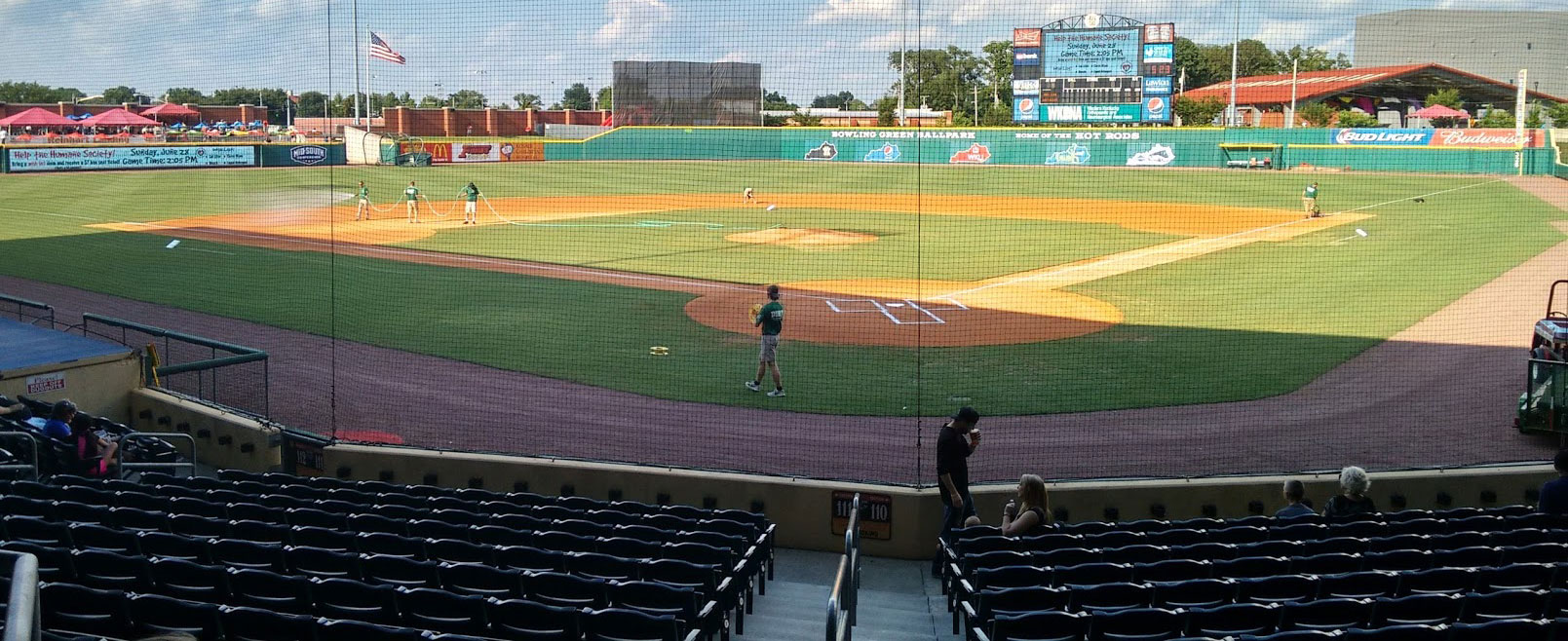
- A view of the ballpark from behind home plate

- Location within Kentucky Location within the United States
- Location: 300 8th Avenue; Bowling Green, Kentucky; United States
- Coordinates: 36°59′48.40″N 86°26′27.26″W
- Owner: Warren County Downtown Economic Development Authority
- Operator: Triple Play, LLC.
- Capacity: 4,559
- Field size: Left field: 318 ft (97 m); Center field: 400 ft (122 m); Right field: 326 ft (99 m)

Construction
- Groundbreaking: June 4, 2008
- Opened: April 17, 2009
- Cost: $28 million ($42 million in 2025 dollars)
- Architect: DLR Group
- Structural engineers: Haris Engineering, Inc.
- General contractor: Alliance Corporation

Tenant
- Bowling Green Hot Rods (SAL/MWL) 2009–present

Bowling Green Ballpark is a baseball park in downtown Bowling Green, Kentucky. It is the home of the Bowling Green Hot Rods, a Minor League Baseball of the South Atlantic League. The ballpark opened on April 17, 2009, and can seat 4,559 people.

The ballpark is occasionally used by the Western Kentucky Hilltoppers baseball team to host some games, such as their 2017 and 2019 games against the Kentucky Wildcats.

== History ==
Opening Day at Bowling Green Ballpark was held on April 17, 2009. The Bowling Green Hot Rods defeated the Kannapolis Intimidators, 8–4, with 6,886 people in attendance. It was the first professional baseball game in Bowling Green, Kentucky, in 67 years. Many ceremonial first pitches were thrown, and the starting lineup of the Hot Rods were driven onto the field by locally owned vintage hot rods.

== Features ==
Bowling Green Ballpark was designed by the architectural firm DLR Group. The right-centerfield wall is concave because of the shape of a pre-existing road behind the field. The scoreboard in right-centerfield measures 35-feet tall and 56-feet wide. It is capable of showing the score, video, advertisements, and player statistics. Embedded in the left field wall is a 6-foot, 3-inch tall by 68-foot wide LED display board, behind which is a picnic area. There are two grass lawn seating areas—one in left-center and one along the right field line. The kids' play area has an inflatable car, a carousel, and a playground. There is also a splash-pad behind the batter's eye in centerfield. The second level includes 10 suites, a bar, and a party deck.

== Other events ==
From May 23 to 27, 2012, the venue hosted the 2012 Sun Belt Conference baseball tournament, which was won by the Louisiana–Monroe Warhawks.

Several concerts have been held at the ballpark, including those by Florida Georgia Line, Nelly, Jake Owen, Ted Nugent, and Uncle Kracker.
