= 2017 Appalachian State Mountaineers baseball team =

American college baseball season

2017 Appalachian State Mountaineers baseball
- Conference: Sun Belt Conference
- East Division
- Record: 19–36 (8–22 SBC)
- Head coach: Kermit Smith (1st season)
- Home stadium: Beaver Field

2017 Sun Belt Conference baseball standings
	Conf.						Overall
Team	W		L		T	PCT	W		L		T	PCT
East Division
Coastal Carolina^{x}^{†} ‍‍‍	22	–	7	–	1	.750	37	–	19	–	1	.658
No. 26 South Alabama^{‡}^{y} ‍‍‍	22	–	8	–	0	.733	40	–	21	–	0	.656
Georgia Southern ‍‍‍	18	–	12	–	0	.600	38	–	21	–	0	.644
Troy ‍‍‍	16	–	14	–	0	.533	31	–	25	–	0	.554
Georgia State ‍‍‍	10	–	20	–	0	.333	22	–	33	–	0	.400
Appalachian State ‍‍‍	8	–	22	–	0	.267	19	–	36	–	0	.345
West Division
UT Arlington^{x} ‍‍‍	20	–	10	–	0	.667	30	–	25	–	0	.545
Louisiana–Lafayette ‍‍‍	19	–	10	–	1	.650	35	–	21	–	1	.623
Arkansas State ‍‍‍	13	–	16	–	0	.448	28	–	27	–	0	.509
Texas State ‍‍‍	13	–	17	–	0	.433	29	–	30	–	0	.492
Little Rock ‍‍‍	11	–	18	–	0	.379	21	–	34	–	0	.382
Louisiana–Monroe ‍‍‍	6	–	24	–	0	.200	12	–	43	–	0	.218
x – Division champion † – Conference champion ‡ – Tournament champion y – Invited to the NCAA tournament Rankings from Collegiate Baseball

The 2017 Appalachian State Mountaineers baseball team represented the Appalachian State University in the 2017 NCAA Division I baseball season. The Mountaineers played their home games at Beaver Field.

== Schedule and results ==
Appalachian State announced its 2017 football schedule on November 14, 2016. The 2017 schedule consists of 19 home and 36 away games in the regular season. The Mountaineers hosted Sun Belts foes Arkansas State, Georgia State, Georgia Southern, Texas–Arlington, and Texas State and traveled to Coastal Carolina, Georgia Southern, Little Rock, Louisiana–Lafayette, and Troy.

The 2017 Sun Belt Conference Championship will be contested May 24–28 in Statesboro, Georgia, and will be hosted by Georgia Southern.

Appalachian State finished 11th in the conference which eliminated the Mountaineers to compete in the tournament which ended the season for the team.

2017 Appalachian State baseball game log
Regular season (19–36)

February (4–4)
Date	Opponent	Rank	Site	Score	Attendance	Overall record	SBC record
Feb. 17	vs. VMI		Brooks Field • Wilmington, NC	L 11–5	1,644	0–1	–
Feb. 18	vs. George Mason		Brooks Field • Wilmington, NC	L 3–1		0–2	–
Feb. 18	vs. VMI		Brooks Field • Wilmington, NC	W 3–1	1,554	1–2	–
Feb. 19	at UNC Wilmington		Brooks Field • Wilmington, NC	L 6–5	1,921	1–3	–
Feb. 24	at Gardner–Webb		John Henry Moss Stadium • Boiling Springs, NC	W 5–4	407	2–3	–
Feb. 25	at Gardner–Webb		John Henry Moss Stadium • Boiling Springs, NC	W 4–2	499	3–3	–
Feb. 26	at Gardner–Webb		John Henry Moss Stadium • Boiling Springs, NC	W 5–1	374	4–3	–
Feb. 28	at #13 South Carolina		Founders Park • Columbia, SC	L 8–4	6,260	4–4	–

March (6–12)
Date	Opponent	Rank	Site	Score	Attendance	Overall record	SBC record
Mar. 3	vs. #16 St. Johns		Clark–LeClair Stadium • Greenville, NC	L 7–3	2,817	4–5	–
Mar. 4	vs. Western Carolina		Clark–LeClair Stadium • Greenville, NC	W 7–3	3,207	5–5	–
Mar. 5	at East Carolina		Clark–LeClair Stadium • Greenville, NC	L 4–0	3,286	5–6	–
Mar. 7	UNC Asheville		Beaver Field • Boone, NC	W 4–3	257	6–6	–
Mar. 10	at Missouri		Taylor Stadium • Columbia, MO	L 4–0	283	6–7	–
Mar. 11	at Missouri		Taylor Stadium • Columbia, MO	L 7–1	160	6–8	–
Mar. 12	at Missouri		Taylor Stadium • Columbia, MO	L 3–2	392	6–9	–
Mar. 14	vs. North Carolina Central		BB&T Ballpark • Charlotte, NC	W 9–5	1,242	7–9	–
Mar. 15	at North Carolina Central		Durham Athletic Park • Durham, NC	W 7–5	65	8–9	–
Mar. 17	at Louisiana–Lafayette		M. L. Tigue Moore Field • Lafayette, LA	L 3–0	4,963	8–10	0–1
Mar. 18	at Louisiana–Lafayette		M. L. Tigue Moore Field • Lafayette, LA	W 12–4	5,005	9–10	1–1
Mar. 19	at Louisiana–Lafayette		M. L. Tigue Moore Field • Lafayette, LA	L 4–3	4,888	9–11	1–2
Mar. 21	Radford		Beaver Field • Boone, NC	W 13–9	415	10–11	–
Mar. 24	Texas State		Beaver Field • Boone, NC	L 6–3	532	10–12	1–3
Mar. 25	Texas State		Beaver Field • Boone, NC	L 7–4	558	10–13	1–4
Mar. 25	Texas State		Beaver Field • Boone, NC	L 2–0	558	10–14	1–5
Mar. 28	Wake Forest		Beaver Field • Boone, NC	L 5–4	955	10–15	–
Mar. 31	at Little Rock		Gary Hogan Field • Little Rock, AR	L 6–2	280	10–16	1–6

April (8–10)
Date	Opponent	Rank	Site	Score	Attendance	Overall record	SBC record
April 1	at Little Rock		Gary Hogan Field • Little Rock, AR	W 3–2	253	11–16	2–6
April 1	at Little Rock		Gary Hogan Field • Little Rock, AR	W 7–6	253	12–16	3–6
April 4	at East Tennessee State		Thomas Stadium • Johnson City, TN	L 5–4	623	12–17	–
April 7	Texas–Arlington		Beaver Field • Boone, NC	L 18–1	172	12–18	3–7
April 8	Texas–Arlington		Beaver Field • Boone, NC	L 5–2	378	12–19	3–8
April 9	Texas–Arlington		Beaver Field • Boone, NC	L 5–4	398	12–20	3–9
April 11	at Davidson		T. Henry Wilson Jr. Field • Davidson, NC	L 12–6	383	12–21	–
April 13	at Georgia Southern		J. I. Clements Stadium • Statesboro, GA	L 6–2	909	12–22	3-10
April 14	at Georgia Southern		J. I. Clements Stadium • Statesboro, GA	W 7–3	957	13–22	4–10
April 15	at Georgia Southern		J. I. Clements Stadium • Statesboro, GA	L 6–4	898	13–23	4–11
April 18	at Radford		Radford Baseball Stadium • Radford, VA	W 7–5	342	14–23	–
April 21	Georgia State		Beaver Field • Boone, NC	L 8–6	205	14–24	4-12
April 22	Georgia State		Beaver Field • Boone, NC	W 6–1	389	15–24	5-12
April 22	Georgia State		Beaver Field • Boone, NC	W 13–1	351	16–24	6-12
April 25	East Tennessee State		Beaver Field • Boone, NC	W 8–7	151	17–24	-
April 28	Arkansas State		Beaver Field • Boone, NC	W 7–6	669	18–24	7-12
April 29	Arkansas State		Beaver Field • Boone, NC	L 5–3	973	18–25	7-13
April 30	Arkansas State		Beaver Field • Boone, NC	L 4–1	548	18–26	7-14

May (1–10)
Date	Opponent	Rank	Site	Score	Attendance	Overall record	SBC record
May 2	at UNC Asheville		Greenwood Baseball Field • Asheville, NC	L 5–3	178	18–27	-
May 5	at Troy		Riddle–Pace Field • Troy, AL	L 9–1	728	18–28	7–15
May 6	at Troy		Riddle–Pace Field • Troy, AL	W 12–2	1,111	19–28	8–15
May 7	at Troy		Riddle–Pace Field • Troy, AL	L 11–3	1,075	19–29	8–16
May 13	South Alabama		Beaver Field • Boone, NC	L 8–6	403	19–30	8–17
May 13	South Alabama		Beaver Field • Boone, NC	L 24–5	403	19–31	8–18
May 14	South Alabama		Beaver Field • Boone, NC	L 11–6	489	19–32	8–19
May 16	vs. #22 Wake Forest		Keeter Stadium • Shelby, NC	L 10–3	4,138	19–33	–
May 18	at #24 Coastal Carolina		Springs Brooks Stadium • Conway, SC	L 5–0	1,278	19–34	8–20
May 19	at #24 Coastal Carolina		Springs Brooks Stadium • Conway, SC	L 4–2	1,838	19–35	8–21
May 20	at #24 Coastal Carolina		Springs Brooks Stadium • Conway, SC	L 6–2	1,910	19–36	8–22

- Rankings are based on the team's current ranking in the Collegiate Baseball poll.
