= 2017 South Alabama Jaguars baseball team =

American college baseball season

2017 South Alabama Jaguars baseball

Sun Belt Conference Tournament champions
- Conference: Sun Belt Conference
- East Division
- Record: 40–21 (22–8 SBC)
- Head coach: Mark Calvi (6th season)
- Assistant coaches: Bob Keller; Alan Luckie; Chris Prothro
- Home stadium: Eddie Stanky Field

2017 Sun Belt Conference baseball standings
	Conf.						Overall
Team	W		L		T	PCT	W		L		T	PCT
East Division
Coastal Carolina^{x}^{†} ‍‍‍	22	–	7	–	1	.750	37	–	19	–	1	.658
No. 26 South Alabama^{‡}^{y} ‍‍‍	22	–	8	–	0	.733	40	–	21	–	0	.656
Georgia Southern ‍‍‍	18	–	12	–	0	.600	38	–	21	–	0	.644
Troy ‍‍‍	16	–	14	–	0	.533	31	–	25	–	0	.554
Georgia State ‍‍‍	10	–	20	–	0	.333	22	–	33	–	0	.400
Appalachian State ‍‍‍	8	–	22	–	0	.267	19	–	36	–	0	.345
West Division
UT Arlington^{x} ‍‍‍	20	–	10	–	0	.667	30	–	25	–	0	.545
Louisiana–Lafayette ‍‍‍	19	–	10	–	1	.650	35	–	21	–	1	.623
Arkansas State ‍‍‍	13	–	16	–	0	.448	28	–	27	–	0	.509
Texas State ‍‍‍	13	–	17	–	0	.433	29	–	30	–	0	.492
Little Rock ‍‍‍	11	–	18	–	0	.379	21	–	34	–	0	.382
Louisiana–Monroe ‍‍‍	6	–	24	–	0	.200	12	–	43	–	0	.218
x – Division champion † – Conference champion ‡ – Tournament champion y – Invited to the NCAA tournament Rankings from Collegiate Baseball

The 2017 South Alabama Jaguars baseball team represented the University of South Alabama in the 2017 NCAA Division I baseball season. The Jaguars played their home games at Eddie Stanky Field.

== Roster ==
2017 South Alabama Jaguars roster
Pitchers: 10 Nick DeSantis – junior; 13 Avery Geyer - Redshirt Junior; 19 Andy Arguelles – freshman; 23 Tyler Carr – junior; 25 Matt Peacock - Redshirt Senior; 26 Thomas Huston – senior; 30 Sean Trimble - Redshirt Sophomore; 31 Zach McMullen - Redshirt Sophomore; 33 Tyler Perez – freshman; 35 Jason Lott – junior; 39 Randy Bell – senior; 40 Joey Jones - Redshirt Senior; 43 Alex Adair – junior; 44 Harrison Spruiell - Redshirt Senior; 49 Zach Melton – junior; Catchers: 14 Carter Perkins – sophomore; 28 Jared Barnes – junior	Infielders: 6 Drew Labounty - Redshirt Junior; 9 Will Luft – junior; 11 Brendan Donovan – sophomore; 15 Torrence Sumerlin – junior; 16 Matt Bolger – senior; 18 Hunter Stokes – freshman; 20 Adam Wolfe – senior; 22 Cam Cummings - Redshirt Junior; 24 Eddie Paparella - Redshirt Junior; 27 Paul Russo – junior; 38 Wells Davis – sophomore; Outfielders: 2 Dylan Hardy – sophomore; 21 Travis Swaggerty – sophomore; 29 Colton Thomas – junior; 32 Griffin Rivers – freshman; 37 Andrew Cash – freshman

=== Coaching staff ===
2017 South Alabama Jaguars coaching staff
- Mark Calvi – Head coach – 6th year
- Bob Keller – Assistant Head coach – 6th year
- Alan Luckie – Assistant Head coach – 11th year
- Chris Prothro – Assistant Head coach/Recruiting Coordinator – 2nd year
- Andrew Carden – Director of Operations – 6th year

== Schedule and results ==
South Alabama announced its 2017 baseball schedule on November 7, 2016. The 2017 schedule consisted of 25 home and 31 away games in the regular season. The Jaguars hosted Sun Belts foes Coastal Carolina, Georgia State, Little Rock, Texas State, and Troy and will travel to Appalachian State, Arkansas State, Georgia Southern, Louisiana–Lafayette, and Louisiana–Monroe.

The 2017 Sun Belt Conference Championship was contested May 24–28 in Statesboro, Georgia, and hosted by Georgia Southern.

South Alabama finished 2nd in the east division of the conference which qualified the Jaguars to compete in the tournament as the 3rd seed for the team's 12th tournament title.

Legend
	South Alabama win
	South Alabama loss
	Postponement/Cancelation/Suspensions
**Bold**	South Alabama team member

2017 South Alabama baseball game log
Regular season (36–19)

February (5–3)
Date	Opponent	Rank	Site	Score	Win	Loss	Save	TV	Attendance	Overall record	SBC record
Feb. 17	Eastern Illinois		Eddie Stanky Field • Mobile, AL	**W** 8–2	**Adair** (1–0)	Stephens (0–1)	None			1–0	
Feb. 18	Eastern Illinois		Eddie Stanky Field • Mobile, AL	**W** 32–0	**Melton** (1–0)	Allen (0–1)	None		1,727	2–0	–
Feb. 19	Eastern Illinois		Eddie Stanky Field • Mobile, AL	**W** 8–3	**DeSantis** (1–0)	Wilson (0–1)	None		1,512	3–0	
Feb. 22	Alabama A&M		Eddie Stanky Field • Mobile, AL	**W** 11–1	**Lott** (1–0)	Milam (0–1)	None		1,203	4–0	
Feb. 24	at Baylor		Baylor Ballpark • Waco, TX	**L** 2–3	Lewis (2–0)	**Bell** (0–1)	Montemayor (2)		2,184	4–1	
Feb. 25	at Baylor		Baylor Ballpark • Waco, TX	**L** 9–10	Robertson (1–0)	**Peacock** (0–1)	Montemayor (3)		2,191	4–2	
Feb. 26	at Baylor		Baylor Ballpark • Waco, TX	**L** 7–9	Bradford (2–0)	**McMullen** (0–1)	None		2,011	4–3	
Feb. 28	New Orleans		Eddie Stanky Field • Mobile, AL	**W** 10–7	**DeSantis** (2–0)	DeMayo (0–2)	None		1,369	5–3	

March (10–8)
Date	Opponent	Rank	Site	Score	Win	Loss	Save	TV	Attendance	Overall record	SBC record
Cox Diamond Invitational
Mar. 3	vs. Southeastern Louisiana		Blue Wahoos Stadium • Pensacola, FL	**L** 3–4	Hileman (2–0)	**Spruiell** (0–1)	None		1,202	5–4	
Mar. 4	vs. Troy		Blue Wahoos Stadium • Pensacola, FL	**W** 6–4	**Trimble** (1–0)	Johnson (1–1)	**Peacock** (1)		1,947	6–4	
Mar. 5	vs. Seton Hall		Blue Wahoos Stadium • Pensacola, FL	**L** 2–3	Prendergast (2–0)	**Melton** (1–1)	Testani (1)		1,138	6–5	
Mar. 7	at Auburn		Plainsman Park • Auburn, AL	**W** 14–3	**Arguelles** (1–0)	Camacho (0–1)	None		1,928	7–5	
Mississippi State Tournament
Mar. 10	vs. Columbia		Dudy Nobel Field • Starkville, MS	**W** 4–1	**DeSantis** (3–0)	Egly (0–2)	None			8–5	
Mar. 10	at Mississippi State		Dudy Noble Field • Starkville, MS	**L** 0–2	Pilkington (2–2)	**Huston** (0–1)	Price (3)		6,501	8–6	
Mar. 11	at Mississippi State		Dudy Noble Field • Starkville, MS	**L** 6–8	Ashcraft (2–0)	**Geyer** (0–1)	Mangum (1)		6,242	8–7	
Mar. 12	vs. Columbia		Dudy Noble Field • Starkville, MS	**W** 4–3	**Lott** (2–0)	Wiest (0–1)	**Peacock** (2)		6,242	9–7	
Mar. 14	Southeastern Louisiana		Eddie Stanky Field • Mobile, AL	**L** 4–12	Hileman (3–0)	**McMullen** (0–2)	None		1,281	9–8	
Mar. 17	at Georgia Southern		J. I. Clements Stadium • Statesboro, GA	**L** 5–8	Condra–Bogan (1–0)	**Bell** (0–2)	Hughes (1)		611	9–9	0–1
Mar. 18	at Georgia Southern		J. I. Clements Stadium • Statesboro, GA	**W** 19–6	**Huston** (1–1)	Eichhorn (1–2)	None		1,816	10–9	1–1
Mar. 19	at Georgia Southern		J. I. Clements Stadium • Statesboro, GA	**W** 5–0	**Carr** (1–0)	Cohen (1–2)	**Peacock** (3)		712	11–9	2–1
Mar. 21	at Alabama State		Wheeler–Watkins Baseball Complex • Montgomery, AL	**W** 13–4	**Arguelles** (2–0)	Vazquez (0–1)	None		129	12–9	
Mar. 24	Georgia State		Eddie Stanky Field • Mobile, AL	**W** 7–0	**Bell** (1–2)	Conley (2–4)	None		1,513	13–9	3–1
Mar. 25	Georgia State		Eddie Stanky Field • Mobile, AL	**W** 16–6	**Huston** (2–1)	Gaddis (3–1)	None		1,217	14–9	4–1
Mar. 26	Georgia State		Eddie Stanky Field • Mobile, AL	**W** 19–9	**Carr** (2–0)	Thomson (1–2)	None		1,470	15–9	5–1
Mar. 28	at No. 23 Southern Miss		Pete Taylor Park • Hattiesburg, MS	**L** 2–4	Braley (3–0)	**Arguelles** (2–1)	Wallner (3)		3,292	15–10	
Mar. 31	at Louisiana–Lafayette		M. L. Tigue Moore Field • Lafayette, LA	**L** 1–11	Leger (5–1)	**Bell** (1–3)	Marks (3)		4,736	15–11	5–2

April (13–6)
Date	Opponent	Rank	Site	Score	Win	Loss	Save	TV	Attendance	Overall record	SBC record
April 1	at Louisiana–Lafayette		M. L. Tigue Moore Field • Lafayette, LA	**W** 6–0	**Huston** (3–1)	Lee (4–3)	None		4,630	16–11	6–2
April 2	at Louisiana–Lafayette		M. L. Tigue Moore Field • Lafayette, LA	**L** 2–10	Harris (3–0)	**Carr** (2–1)	None		4,752	16–12	6–3
April 4	at Southeastern Louisiana		Alumni Field • Hammond, LA	**L** 9–12	Mount (1–0)	**Arguelles** (2–2)	Hileman (1)		1,136	16–13	
April 7	at Louisiana–Monroe		Warhawk Field • Monroe, LA	**W** 14–2	**Bell** (2–3)	Leone (1–4)	None		812	17–13	7–3
April 8	at Louisiana–Monroe		Warhawk Field • Monroe, LA	**W** 4–1	**Huston** (4–1)	Beal (3–3)	None		996	18–13	8–3
April 9	at Louisiana–Monroe		Warhawk Field • Monroe, LA	**W** 8–3	**Carr** (3–1)	Martin (0–1)	None		848	19–13	9–3
April 11	at New Orleans		Maestri Field • New Orleans, LA	**W** 9–6	**Melton** (2–1)	Griffin (2–1)	**Peacock** (4)		193	20–13	–
April 13	No. 26 Coastal Carolina		Eddie Stanky Field • Mobile, AL	**L** 3–4	Holmes (2–2)	**Peacock** (0–2)	None		2,019	20–14	9-4
April 14	No. 26 Coastal Carolina		Eddie Stanky Field • Mobile, AL	**L** 9–11	Beckwith (5–1)	**Geyer** (0–2)	Kitchen (3)		2,276	20–15	9–5
April 15	No. 26 Coastal Carolina		Eddie Stanky Field • Mobile, AL	**W** 4–3	**Eiland** (1–0)	Veneziano (2–2)	None		1,681	21–15	10–5
April 18	No. 14 Mississippi State		Eddie Stanky Field • Mobile, AL	**W** 5–2	**Trimble** (2–0)	Parker (0–1)	**Peacock** (5)		3,104	22–15	–
April 19	Alabama State		Eddie Stanky Field • Mobile, AL	**W** 6–4	**Perez** (1–0)	Gonzales (0–1)	None		1,231	23–15	–
April 22	at Arkansas State		Tomlinson Stadium–Kell Field • Jonesboro, AR	**L** 10–12	Welsh (2–1)	**Huston** (4–2)	Zuber (5)		–	23–16	10–6
April 22	at Arkansas State		Tomlinson Stadium–Kell Field • Jonesboro, AR	**W** 12–2	**Bell** (3–3)	Mitzel (1–3)	None		307	24–16	11–6
April 23	at Arkansas State		Tomlinson Stadium–Kell Field • Jonesboro, AR	**W** 15–5	**Peacock** (1–2)	Culbertson (3–5)	None		511	25–16	12–6
April 25	No. 30 Southern Miss		Eddie Stanky Field • Mobile, AL	**L** 7–13	Powers (3–0)	**Trimble** (2–1)	None		2,036	25–17	–
April 28	Texas State		Eddie Stanky Field • Mobile, AL	**W** 8–3	**Bell** (4–3)	Reich (2–4)	None		1,347	26–17	13–6
April 29	Texas State		Eddie Stanky Field • Mobile, AL	**W** 9–4	**Huston** (5–2)	Fraze (4–2)	**Peacock** (6)		1,387	27–17	14–6
April 30	Texas State		Eddie Stanky Field • Mobile, AL	**W** 7–5	**Peacock** (2–2)	Powell (1–2)	None		1,215	28–17	15-6

May (8–2)
Date	Opponent	Rank	Site	Score	Win	Loss	Save	TV	Attendance	Overall record	SBC record
May 5	Little Rock		Eddie Stanky Field • Mobile, AL	**W** 8–3	**Bell** (5–3)	LeMoine (2–5)	**Peacock** (7)		1,276	29–17	16–6
May 6	Little Rock		Eddie Stanky Field • Mobile, AL	**L** 5–11	Malcom (3–5)	**Huston** (5–3)	None		1,492	29–18	16–7
May 7	Little Rock		Eddie Stanky Field • Mobile, AL	**W** 5–3	**Carr** (4–1)	Fidel (2–7)	**Peacock** (8)		1,229	30–18	17–7
May 9	at No. 10 LSU		Alex Box Stadium • Baton Rouge, LA	**W** 7–6	**Arguelles** (3–2)	Bush (1–1)	**Peacock** (9)		10,312	31–18	–
May 13	at Appalachian State		Beaver Field • Boone, NC	**W** 8–6	**Peacock** (3–2)	Howell (1–2)	None		403	32–18	18–7
May 13	at Appalachian State		Beaver Field • Boone, NC	**W** 24–5	**Carr** (5–1)	Watts (2–7)	**Perez** (1)		403	33–18	19–7
May 14	at Appalachian State		Beaver Field • Boone, NC	**W** 11–6	**Geyer** (1–2)	DeVrieze (2–1)	None		489	34–18	20–7
May 18	Troy	No. 25	Eddie Stanky Field • Mobile, AL	**L** 4–5	Childress (4–3)	**Peacock** (3–3)	Skinner (12)		1,515	34–19	20–8
May 19	Troy	No. 25	Eddie Stanky Field • Mobile, AL	**W** 10–6	**Carr** (6–1)	Osby (5–5)	None		1,602	35–19	21–8
May 20	Troy	No. 25	Eddie Stanky Field • Mobile, AL	**W** 10–7	**Geyer** (2–2)	Johnson (1–2)	None		1,389	36–19	22–8

Postseason (4–2)

SBC Tournament (3–0)
Date	Opponent	Rank/(Seed)	Site	Score	Win	Loss	Save	TV	Attendance	Overall record	SBCT Record
May 26	vs. (6) Troy	No. 26/(3)	J. I. Clements Stadium • Statesboro, GA	**W** 9–1	**Bell** (6–3)	Crane (6–2)	None		153	37–19	1–0
May 27	vs. (7) Arkansas State	No. 26/(3)	J. I. Clements Stadium • Statesboro, GA	**W** 4–2	**Carr** (7–1)	Kirby (4–2)	**Peacock** (10)		232	38–19	2–0
May 28	vs. (5) Georgia Southern	No. 26/(3)	J. I. Clements Stadium • Statesboro, GA	**W** 7–6	**Geyer** (3–2)	Kelly (1–1)	None		1,467	39–19	3–0

NCAA tournament (1–2)
Date	Opponent	Rank/(Seed)	Site	Score	Win	Loss	Save	TV	Attendance	Overall record	NCAAT record
Hattiesburg Regional
Jun. 2	vs. No. 22/(2) Mississippi State	No. 19/(3)	Pete Taylor Park • Hattiesburg, MS	**W** 6–3	**Bell** (7–3)	Gordon (2–3)	None		4,248	40–19	1–0
Jun. 4	at No. 14/(1) Southern Miss	No. 19/(3)	Pete Taylor Park • Hattiesburg, MS	**L** 3–8	**Cummings** (7–2)	Carr (7–2)	None		4,237	40–20	1–1
Jun. 4	vs. No. 22/(2) Mississippi State	No. 19/(3)	Pete Taylor Park • Hattiesburg, MS	**L** 3–7	McQuary (3–3)	**Arguelles** (3–3)	Plumlee (1)		4,181	40–21	1–2

- Rankings are based on the team's current ranking in the Collegiate Baseball poll.
