= Steve Kittrell =

American college baseball coach (born 1948)

Current position
- Title: Retired
- Team: South Alabama
- Conference: Sun Belt
- Record: 1052–644–1

Biographical details
- Born: November 1, 1948 (age 77); Mobile, Alabama, U.S.
- Education: University of South Alabama

Playing career
- 1968–1971: South Alabama

Coaching career (HC unless noted)
- 1974-1975: Niceville High School
- 1976-1978: University Military School
- 1979-1980: Enterprise State Junior College
- 1981-1982: UMS Preparatory School
- 1983: Spring Hill College
- 1984-2011: University of South Alabama

Accomplishments and honors

Awards
- Sun Belt Conference Coach of the Year (1992, 1996, 1998, 1999, 2001, 2003)

Steve Kittrell (born November 1, 1948) is an American college baseball coach. Most recently, he was the head baseball coach at South Alabama. He owns a career record of 1052–644–1 in 25 seasons at South Alabama. He started his career as the head baseball coach at Niceville High School in Florida where he posted a 35–15 record in two seasons. From 1976 to 1978, he became the head baseball coach at University Military School in Mobile, Alabama, where he went 95–34. From 1979 to 1980, he coached at Enterprise State Junior College in Enterprise, Alabama, and had a two-season record of 52–30. In 1983, he coached at Spring Hill College, posting a 33–19 record.

Kittrell played baseball at South Alabama, and played one year in the Boston Red Sox organization, reaching Class-A Winter Haven.

He became the 50th coach in NCAA baseball history to reach the 1,000-win plateau on February 23, 2009. He has led the Jaguars to 18 NCAA tournament appearances, including 10 Sun Belt Conference championships. He is a member of the South Alabama Athletic Hall of Fame.

On June 25, 2010, Kittrell announced his plan to retire after the 2011 season. Kittrell was replaced by Mark Calvi, former pitching coach for the University of South Carolina.
