= South Alabama Jaguars baseball =

South Alabama Jaguars
- 2026 South Alabama Jaguars baseball team
- Founded: 1965
- University: University of South Alabama
- Head coach: Mark Calvi (15th season)
- Conference: Sun Belt; East Division
- Location: Mobile, Alabama
- Home stadium: Eddie Stanky Field (capacity: 4,500)
- Nickname: Jaguars
- Colors: Blue, white, and red

NCAA tournament appearances
- 1972, 1973, 1975, 1977, 1980, 1983, 1984, 1987, 1989, 1990, 1991, 1992, 1993, 1995, 1996, 1997, 1998, 1999, 2000, 2001, 2002, 2003, 2005, 2006, 2013, 2016, 2017, 2021

Conference tournament champions
- Sun Belt: 1980, 1981, 1983, 1984, 1987, 1992, 1996, 1997, 2000, 2001, 2005, 2017, 2021

Conference regular season champions
- Sun Belt: 1980, 1981, 1983, 1984, 1987, 1992, 1996, 1998, 1999, 2001, 2002, 2003, 2004, 2013, 2015, 2016, 2021

The South Alabama Jaguars baseball team is a varsity intercollegiate athletic team of the University of South Alabama in Mobile, Alabama, United States. The team is a member of the Sun Belt Conference, which is part of the National Collegiate Athletic Association's Division I. The team plays its home games at Eddie Stanky Field in Mobile, Alabama. The Jaguars are coached by Mark Calvi.

== Year-by-year results ==
Record table
Season	Coach	Overall	Conference	Standing	Postseason
District III Independent (1965–1980)
1965	Mel Lucas	3–12			
1966	Mel Lucas	13–11			
1967	Mel Lucas	16–12			
1968	Mel Lucas	18–9			
1969	Eddie Stanky	19–12			
1970	Eddie Stanky	26–14–2			
1971	Eddie Stanky	36–11			
1972	Eddie Stanky	36–8			1972 NCAA Regional
1973	Eddie Stanky	33–9			1973 NCAA Regional
1974	Eddie Stanky	30–8			
1975	Eddie Stanky	52–14			1975 NCAA Regional
1976	Eddie Stanky	34–13			
1977	Eddie Stanky	42–13			1977 NCAA Regional
1978	Eddie Stanky	38–14		1st	
1979	Eddie Stanky	32–15		2nd	
1980	Jim Crawford	33–11		1st	1980 NCAA Regional
Sun Belt Conference (1981–present)
1981	Eddie Stanky	40–23	5–3	T-2nd	
1982	Eddie Stanky	32–15	4–4	T-3rd	
1983	Eddie Stanky	40–26	12–5	2nd	1983 NCAA Regional
1984	Steve Kittrell	50–19	11–6	1st	1984 NCAA Regional
1985	Steve Kittrell	22–32	5–11	T-6th	
1986	Steve Kittrell	36–25	9–9	4th	
1987	Steve Kittrell	40–30	10–8	3rd	1987 NCAA Regional
1988	Steve Kittrell	41–22	11–7	4th	
1989	Steve Kittrell	45–22	11–7	3rd	1989 NCAA Regional
1990	Steve Kittrell	44–20	12–6	2nd	1990 NCAA Regional
1991	Steve Kittrell	44–14	13–3	1st	1991 NCAA Regional
1992	Steve Kittrell	44–16	14–7	3rd	1992 NCAA Regional
1993	Steve Kittrell	37–21–1	11–6	2nd	1993 NCAA Regional
1994	Steve Kittrell	32–25	16–6	1st	
1995	Steve Kittrell	41–17	20–7	2nd	1995 NCAA Regional
1996	Steve Kittrell	42–17	22–5	1st	1996 NCAA Regional
1997	Steve Kittrell	43–19	15–10	2nd	1997 NCAA Regional
1998	Steve Kittrell	42–19	19–6	1st	1998 NCAA Regional
1999	Steve Kittrell	39–20	27–5	1st	1999 NCAA Regional
2000	Steve Kittrell	27–33	14–15	5th	2000 NCAA Regional
2001	Steve Kittrell	45–19	17–10	T-1st	2001 NCAA Regional
2002	Steve Kittrell	42–19	17–5	1st	2002 NCAA Regional
2003	Steve Kittrell	42–19	17–7	1st	2003 NCAA Regional
2004	Steve Kittrell	30–28	16–8	T-1st	
2005	Steve Kittrell	35–27	15–9	2nd	2005 NCAA Regional
2006	Steve Kittrell	39–21	16–7	3rd	2006 NCAA Regional
2007	Steve Kittrell	31–26	13–16	8th	
2008	Steve Kittrell	32–26	15–15	7th	
2009	Steve Kittrell	25–30	13–16	6th	
2010	Steve Kittrell	32–27	17–13	T-4th	
2011	Steve Kittrell	30–28	15–15	6th	
2012	Mark Calvi	23–34	15–15	T-4th	
2013	Mark Calvi	43–20	20–10	T-1st	2013 NCAA Regional
2014	Mark Calvi	22–33	11–18	T-6th	
2015	Mark Calvi	37–20	19–9	1st	
2016	Mark Calvi	40–20	21–9	T-1st	2016 NCAA Regional
2017	Mark Calvi	40–21	22–8	2nd	2017 NCAA Regional
2018	Mark Calvi	32–25	18–11	3rd	
2019	Mark Calvi	30–26	16–14	T6th	
2020	Mark Calvi	8–10	0–0		(Season cut short due to the COVID-19 pandemic)
2021	Mark Calvi	36–22	15–9	1st (East)	2021 NCAA Regional
2022	Mark Calvi	31–23	17–13	5th	
2023	Mark Calvi	23–31	11–19	11th	
2024	Mark Calvi	31–24	14–16	9th	
2025	Mark Calvi	23-28	12–18	11th	
2026	Mark Calvi	34-23	17-13	T-3rd	
Sun Belt:		1974–1182–3	604–421		
Total:		1974-1182–3			
National champion Postseason invitational champion Conference regular season champion Conference regular season and conference tournament champion Division regular season champion Division regular season and conference tournament champion Conference tournament champion

== Notable players ==
Jaguars players who have played in Major League Baseball (MLB) include:

- Marlon Anderson
- Allen Battle
- Glenn Borgmann
- Pete Coachman
- Brendan Donovan (AS, GG)
- Mark Ettles (BAHF)
- Steve Falteisek
- David Freese (AS, WS)
- Jay Gainer
- Luis Gonzalez (AS, SS, WS)
- Lance Johnson (AS)
- Jon Lieber (AS)
- Adam Lind (SS)
- Michael Nakamura (BAHF, JS)
- Mike Maksudian
- Mike Mordecai (WS)
- Mike O'Berry
- Jordan Patterson
- Matt Peacock
- Juan Pierre (WS)
- Pat Putnam
- Tyler Samaniego
- Stephen Sparks
- Locke St. John
- David Stapleton
- Travis Swaggerty
- Ben Taylor
- P. J. Walters
- Turner Ward

Notes:

- BAHF designates a player who has been inducted to the Baseball Australia Hall of Fame
- AS designates a player selected to the Major League Baseball All-Star Game
- GG designates a player who has received a Gold Glove Award
- JS designates a player who played on a Japan Series championship team
- SS designates a player who has received a Silver Slugger Award
- WS designates a player who played on a World Series championship team

== All-American players ==
=== All-Americans ===
- 1971 Glenn Borgmann, C
- 1973 Ernie Rosseau, OF
- 1978 Mark Johnston, OF
- 1984 Pete Coachman, 3B
- 1984 Lance Johnson, OF
- 1986 Tim Becker, SS
- 1986 Mike Dull, 3B
- 1988 Luis Gonzalez, 1B
- 1989 Mike Mordecai, SS
- 1990 Mike Zimmerman, P
- 1992 Andrew Kontorinis, 1B
- 1992 Jon Lieber, P
- 1995 Marlon Anderson, 2B
- 1996 Jason Norton, P
- 1996 Micheal Nakamura, P
- 1998 Mike Fischer, P
- 1998 Juan Pierre, OF
- 1999 Eben Wells, OF
- 2002 Ryan Mulhern, OF
- 2003 Ryan Mulhern, OF
- 2004 Adam Lind, OF
- 2004 P. J. Walters, P
- 2006 David Freese, 3B
- 2006 P. J. Walters, P
- 2007 Jeff Cunningham, 1B
- 2008 Ryne Jernigan, 2B
- 2009 David Doss, C
- 2013 Jordan Patterson, UT
- 2015 Kevin Hill, P
- 2016 Kevin Hill, P

=== Freshmen All-Americans ===
- 1986 Luis Gonzalez, 1B
- 1987 Mike Mordecai, SS
- 1995 Micheal Nakamura, P
- 1995 Dave Crittenden, OF
- 1996 Seth Taylor, SS
- 1999 Tim Merritt, OF
- 2001 Clark Girardeau
- 2003 Adam Lind, OF
- 2004 P. J. Walters, P
- 2006 David Doss, DH
- 2011 Logan Kirkland, SS
- 2016 Travis Swaggerty, OF

== See also ==
- List of NCAA Division I baseball programs
