= South Alabama Jaguars =

University of South Alabama intercollegiate teams

- University: University of South Alabama
- Nickname: Jags
- NCAA: Division I (FBS)
- Conference: Sun Belt
- Athletic director: Joel Erdmann
- Location: Mobile, Alabama
- Varsity teams: 17 (8 men's, 9 women's)
- Football stadium: Hancock Whitney Stadium
- Basketball arena: Mitchell Center
- Baseball stadium: Eddie Stanky Field
- Softball stadium: Jaguar Field
- Other venues: Jag Gym
- Colors: Blue, white, and red
- Mascot: South Paw
- Website: usajaguars.com

The South Alabama Jaguars represent the University of South Alabama in NCAA Division I intercollegiate athletics. South Alabama competes in the Sun Belt Conference; it is the conference's only member to have remained in the conference since it was founded. South Alabama sponsors 8 men's sports teams and 9 women's sports teams, with the football team starting in 2009.

South Alabama has Sun Belt rivalries with all of the East Division schools (Appalachian State, Coastal Carolina, Georgia State, Georgia Southern, and Troy). South Alabama's main Sun Belt rivals are Southern Miss and Troy.

Men's Sports: basketball, baseball, cross country, golf, tennis, indoor and outdoor track and field, football (FCS Independent 2011–2012, full Sun Belt Conference play began in 2013)

Women's Sports: basketball, softball, cross country, golf, tennis, indoor and outdoor track and field, volleyball, soccer

Though not officially recognized by the administration, South Alabama students maintain a multi-sport battle cry "South in Your Mouth." It is used widely across the school, though primarily heard in reference to football and basketball.

USA formerly used Lady Jaguars for its women's teams, but by the 2012–13 school year, only the women's basketball team was using "Lady Jaguars", and starting with the 2013–14 school year, that team also became simply the Jaguars.

== Sports sponsored ==
Men's sports	Women's sports
Baseball	Basketball
Basketball	Cross country
Cross country	Golf
Football	Soccer
Golf	Softball
Tennis	Tennis
Track and field^{†}	Track and field^{†}
	Volleyball
† – Track and field includes both indoor and outdoor.

=== Football ===
Sun Belt Conference logo in South Alabama's colors

On December 6, 2007, the school's Board of Trustees approved the addition of football to the intercollegiate athletics program. The team began play in 2009 with a planned full transition to the NCAA Division I Football Bowl Subdivision (Division I-A) by 2013. On February 15, 2008, President Gordon Moulton and Athletic Director Joe Gottfried announced that Joey Jones, former University of Alabama and Atlanta Falcons receiver, would be the first head football coach in the university's history. In early August 2009, the President Moulton hired Dr. Joel Erdmann to take over as athletic director tapping into Erdmann's experience building sports programs and his experience with both football operations and game day programming. On September 5, 2009, the South Alabama Jaguars defeated Hargrave Military Academy 30–13 in their first ever game, and finished their first ever football season on November 12, 2009, with a shutout of an NCAA Division III team with a 35–0 victory over Huntingdon (Ala.) College. USA completed its first season undefeated at 7–0, outscoring its opponents by a combined score of 321–41. The 2010 schedule was made up of schools from National Collegiate Athletics Association Division I-FCS, NCAA Division II, and the National Association of Intercollegiate Athletics. USA finished the season undefeated at 10–0, outscoring its opponents by a combined score of 413–130. On September 17, 2011, South Alabama suffered its first loss in the new program's history when it traveled to Carter-Finley Stadium in Raleigh, NC against the North Carolina State Wolfpack. After the week 3 game of the 2011-2012 football season S. Alabama's season record stood at 2–1, with an all-time record of 19–1.

=== Baseball ===
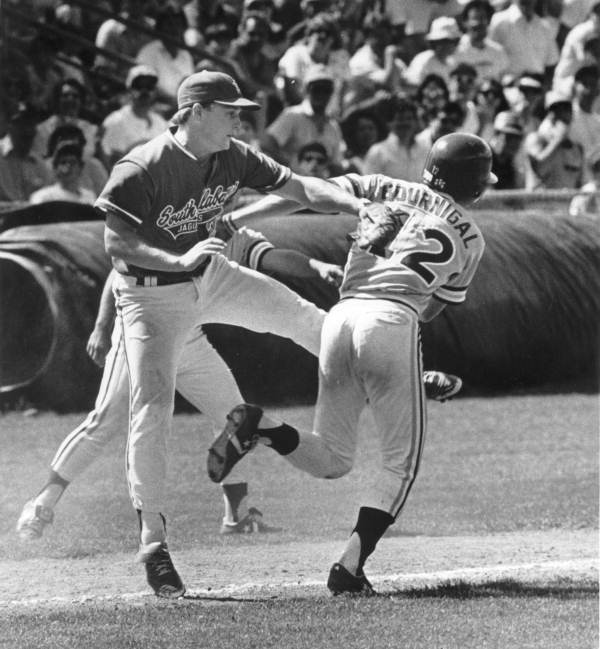
A South Alabama pitcher (left) tags out a Florida State baserunner during the 1987 NCAA Division I baseball tournament

The baseball team is typically a powerhouse in the Sun Belt Conference, and has produced a number of successful Major League players, such as Juan Pierre, Adam Lind, Luis Gonzalez, Jon Lieber, Marlon Anderson and David Freese. Since the creation of the Sun Belt conference in 1978, South Alabama leads with 12 Sun Belt Tournament titles; the next highest is Louisiana–Lafayette with 4. In addition to the 12 conference titles, South Alabama has participated in the NCAA Tournament on 28 occasions.

The South Alabama baseball team plays its home games at Eddie Stanky Field. It features a natural grass playing surface and is named after former coach Eddie Stanky who compiled a 488-193 (.717) record in 14 seasons as coach. Stanky Field seats 4,500 spectators, and features the Jon Lieber Clubhouse and Luis Gonzalez Hitting Facility. The success of the Jaguars at Stanky Field continued under Steve Kittrell. Kittrell led the Jaguar baseball program to more than 1,000 victories, 18 NCAA Tournament appearances, and numerous Sun Belt Conference championships. On July 15, 2010, it was announced that Mark Calvi, pitching coach at College World Series Champion University of South Carolina, would be Kittrell's assistant coach for the 2011 season, and take over as the new head coach in 2012.

In 2011, alumnus David Freese was named the National League Championship Series MVP and World Series MVP.

=== Basketball ===
The men's basketball team has a strong history as a founding member of the Sun Belt Conference. After a successful stint in the late 1980s and 1990s, South Alabama basketball declined in the early part of the 2000s. In 2002, John Pelphrey was named coach and brought the team back to its winning ways. In 2006, South Alabama won the Sun Belt Conference tournament, defeating Western Kentucky 95–70 in the championship game; thereby earning a bid into the NCAA tournament. This was their first since NCAA bid since 1998 and were seeded 14th in the Minneapolis bracket. They lost to the 3rd-seeded Florida Gators, 76–50, who went on to win the 2006 NCAA men's basketball tournament. The 2005-2006 basketball season marked the best turnaround in the nation for a Division I basketball program. South Alabama was 10–18 in 2004-05 and went 24–7 in 2005–2006. This yielded a 12.5 differential to lead the nation, ahead of Brigham Young and Memphis who both had 11.5 differentials. South Alabama followed that with three more 20-win seasons in a row, and in 2008 received an at-large bid to the NCAA tournament, but lost to Butler University in the first round. Since the Sun Belt expansion to 13 members in the 2006–2007 season, South Alabama is second only to Western Kentucky in conference winning percentage (65.3% to WKU's 76.4%).

=== Men's Golf ===
The men's golf team has won 10 Sun Belt Conference championships: 1991–92, 1994–96, 1998–99, 2002, 2005, 2010. Heath Slocum is the team's most successful professional golfer with four PGA Tour wins.

=== Other Sports ===
- Men's and women's tennis teams are consistently ranked among the nation's best.
- The men's track team has been consistent in recent years. David Kimani won a cross-country championship in 1999 and two individual titles in 2000. Vincent Rono won the NCAA Outdoor Championship in 2006. The indoor track team captured a conference championship in 2007.
- Women's softball was added to South Alabama's sports in 2007. The softball team plays its home games at Jaguar Field.

== See also ==
- Cultural significance of the jaguar in North America
- Jaguar
