= Jeff Schexnaider =

Playing career
- 1984–1985: Gulf Coast CC
- 1986–1987: Louisiana–Monroe

Coaching career (HC unless noted)
- 1988–1989: Louisiana–Monroe (assistant)
- 1990: Catholic HS
- 1991–1994: Ouachita Parish HS
- 1995–2004: West Monroe HS
- 2005: Louisiana–Monroe (assistant)
- 2006–2014: Louisiana–Monroe

Head coaching record
- Overall: 212–254

Accomplishments and honors

Awards
- Sun Belt Coach of the Year (2008)

Jeff Schexnaider is an American former baseball coach. He is a member of the Catholic High School (Baton Rouge) athletic Hall of Fame and the Louisiana Baseball Coaches Association Hall of Fame. Schexnaider was the head baseball coach at the University of Louisiana at Monroe from 2006 to 2014, compiling an overall record of 212–254.

== Head coaching record ==
Record table
Season	Team	Overall	Conference	Standing	Postseason
Louisiana–Monroe Indians (Southland Conference) (2006–2006)
2006	Louisiana–Monroe	18–24	12–16	8th	
Louisiana–Monroe:		18–24	12–16		
Louisiana–Monroe Warhawks (Sun Belt Conference) (2007–2014)
2007	Louisiana–Monroe	29–28	15–14	T-3rd	
2008	Louisiana–Monroe	34–24	20–10	1st	
2009	Louisiana–Monroe	32–27	12–17	T-7th	
2010	Louisiana–Monroe	17–38	7–23	10th	
2011	Louisiana–Monroe	24–30	9–21	T-9th	
2012	Louisiana–Monroe	32–30	15–15	T-5th	2012 NCAA Baton Rouge Regional (1-2)
2013	Louisiana–Monroe	18–36	7–23	10th	
2014	Louisiana–Monroe	8–17	1–5		
Louisiana–Monroe:		194–230	86–128		
Total:		212–254			
National champion Postseason invitational champion Conference regular season champion Conference regular season and conference tournament champion Division regular season champion Division regular season and conference tournament champion Conference tournament champion
