= Jordan Patterson =

American baseball player (born 1992)

- Outfielder / First baseman
- Born: February 12, 1992 (age 34); Mobile, Alabama, U.S.
- Batted: Left Threw: Left

MLB debut
- September 8, 2016, for the Colorado Rockies

Last MLB appearance
- October 2, 2016, for the Colorado Rockies

MLB statistics
- Batting average: .444
- Home runs: 0
- Runs batted in: 2
- Stats at Baseball Reference

Teams
- Colorado Rockies (2016)

Jordan Andrew Patterson (born February 12, 1992) is an American former professional baseball outfielder and first baseman. He played in Major League Baseball (MLB) for the Colorado Rockies.

== Amateur career ==
At Baker High School in Mobile County, Alabama, Patterson played four years of baseball, football and basketball. As a senior, he had a 1.63 earned run average and hit .439 with 17 extra-base hits and eight stolen bases.

Patterson initially intended to accept a scholarship to play college baseball at Mississippi Gulf Coast Community College but changed his commitment to the University of South Alabama shortly before the fall semester began. In 2012, he played collegiate summer baseball with the Bourne Braves of the Cape Cod Baseball League. As a junior, he was the Sun Belt Conference Player of the Year.

== Professional career ==
=== Colorado Rockies ===
He was drafted by the Colorado Rockies in the fourth round of the 2013 Major League Baseball draft. He made his professional debut with the Grand Junction Rockies and spent 2014 with the Asheville Tourists. Patterson started 2015 with Modesto Nuts and was promoted to the Double-A New Britain Rock Cats in July. During the final month of the season he transitioned into a first baseman. Patterson was promoted to the Major Leagues on September 6, 2016. He was designated for assignment by the Rockies on November 20, 2018.

=== Toronto Blue Jays ===
On November 26, 2018, Patterson was claimed off waivers by the New York Mets. Three days later, he was claimed off waivers again, this time by the Cincinnati Reds. The next day, Patterson was non-tendered and became a free agent. On December 4, he re-signed with Cincinnati on a minor league contract. On March 27, 2019, Patterson was traded to the Toronto Blue Jays. He played in 104 games for the Triple–A Buffalo Bisons, hitting .234/.308/.432 with 16 home runs and 47 RBI. Patterson elected free agency following the season on November 4.

On February 23, 2020, Patterson signed a minor league contract with the Chicago Cubs. He did not play in a game in 2020 due to the cancellation of the minor league season because of the COVID-19 pandemic. Patterson was released by the Cubs organization on May 28.

=== Fargo-Moorhead RedHawks ===
On July 12, 2020, Patterson signed with the Fargo-Moorhead RedHawks of the American Association of Independent Professional Baseball. In 13 games for Fargo, he hit .122/.163/.195 with no home runs and no RBI. Patterson was released by the club on July 31.
