= 2019 LSU Tigers baseball team =

Louisiana State University in the 2019 NCAA Division I baseball season

2019 LSU Tigers baseball

Baton Rouge Regional champions

Baton Rouge Super Regional, 0-2
- Conference: Southeastern Conference
- Western Division

Ranking
- Coaches: No. 16
- CB: No. 14
- Record: 40–26 (17–13 SEC)
- Head coach: Paul Mainieri (13th season)
- Assistant coaches: Alan Dunn; Nolan Cain
- Home stadium: Alex Box Stadium, Skip Bertman Field

2019 Southeastern Conference baseball standings
	Conf.						Overall
Team	W		L		T	PCT	W		L		T	PCT
Eastern
No. 1 Vanderbilt ^{x}‍†‍‡‍^{y}	23	–	7	–	0	.767	58	–	12	–	0	.829
No. 18 Georgia ‍‍‍^{y}	21	–	9	–	0	.700	46	–	17	–	0	.730
Tennessee ‍‍‍^{y}	14	–	16	–	0	.467	40	–	21	–	0	.656
Missouri ‍‍‍	13	–	16	–	1	.450	34	–	22	–	1	.605
Florida ‍‍‍^{y}	13	–	17	–	0	.433	34	–	26	–	0	.567
South Carolina ‍‍‍	8	–	22	–	0	.267	28	–	28	–	0	.500
Kentucky ‍‍‍	7	–	23	–	0	.233	26	–	29	–	0	.473
Western
No. 5 Mississippi State ^{x}‍‍‍^{y}	20	–	10	–	0	.667	52	–	15	–	0	.776
No. 6 Arkansas ^{x}‍‍‍^{y}	20	–	10	–	0	.667	46	–	20	–	0	.697
No. 14 LSU ‍‍‍^{y}	17	–	13	–	0	.567	40	–	26	–	0	.606
No. 20 Texas A&M ‍‍‍^{y}	16	–	13	–	1	.550	39	–	23	–	1	.627
No. 12 Ole Miss ‍‍‍^{y}	16	–	14	–	0	.533	41	–	27	–	0	.603
No. 9 Auburn ‍‍‍^{y}	14	–	16	–	0	.467	38	–	28	–	0	.576
Alabama ‍‍‍	7	–	23	–	0	.233	30	–	26	–	0	.536
x – Division champion † – Conference champion ‡ – Tournament champion y – Invited to the NCAA tournament As of June 25, 2019; Rankings from D1Baseball

The 2019 LSU Tigers baseball team represented Louisiana State University in the 2019 NCAA Division I baseball season. The Tigers played their home games at Alex Box Stadium. They, along with McNeese State and Southern, were the only three teams in the state to make the tournament.

== Preseason ==
=== Preseason All-American teams ===
3rd Team

- Daniel Cabrera - Outfielder (Collegiate Baseball)
- Zack Hess - Starting Pitcher (Baseball America)

=== SEC media poll ===
The SEC media poll was released on February 7, 2019 with the Tigers predicted to win the Western Division.

Media poll (West)
Predicted finish	Team	Votes (1st place)
1	LSU	88 (10)
2	Ole Miss	65 (1)
3	Arkansas	59 (1)
4	Auburn	57 (1)
5	Texas A&M	48 (1)
6	Mississippi State	47
7	Alabama	21

=== Preseason All-SEC teams ===
2nd Team

- Antoine Duplantis - Outfielder
- Daniel Cabrera - Outfielder

== Roster ==
2019 LSU Tigers roster
Pitchers: 10 Eric Walker - Sophomore; 11 Landon Marceaux - Freshman; 18 Cole Henry - Freshman; 20 Will Ripoll - Freshman; 21 Nick Storz - Sophomore; 26 AJ Labas - Sophomore; 27 Matthew Beck - Junior; 28 Devin Fontenot - Sophomore; 29 Chase Costello - Freshman; 30 Trent Vietmeier - Sophomore; 32 Aaron George - Junior; 35 Clay Moffitt - Senior; 38 Zack Hess - Junior; 40 Riggs Threadgill - Freshman; 41 Caleb Gilbert - Senior; 43 Todd Peterson - Junior; 44 Jaden Hill - Freshman; 46 Rye Gunter - Freshman; 52 Ma'Khail Hilliard - Sophomore; 55 Easton McMurray - Freshman	Catchers: 13 Saul Garza - Sophomore; 22 Brock Mathis - Sophomore; 45 Braden Doughty - Sophomore; Infielders: 3 Hal Hughes - Sophomore; 4 Josh Smith - Junior; 5 Drew Bianco - Freshman; 6 Gavin Dugas - Freshman; 16 Brandt Broussard - Senior; 24 Cade Beloso - Freshman; 48 Michael Kirsch - Sophomore; 17 Chris Reid - Senior	Outfielders: 2 Daniel Cabrera - Sophomore; 7 Giovanni DiGiacomo - Freshman; 8 Antoine Duplantis - Senior; 9 Zach Watson - Junior; Utility: 23 CJ Willis - Freshman

== Schedule and results ==
Legend
	LSU win
	LSU loss
	Postponement
**Bold**	LSU team member

2019 LSU Tigers baseball game log
Regular season (34–22)

February (8–0)
Date	Opponent	Rank	Site/stadium	Score	Win	Loss	Save	TV	Attendance	Overall record	SEC record
Feb. 15	Louisiana–Monroe	No. 2	Alex Box Stadium; Baton Rouge, Louisiana	12–7	**Fontenot** (1–0)	Gray (0–1)	None	SECN+	12,404	1–0	
Feb. 16	Army	No. 2	Alex Box Stadium	6–5	**Peterson** (1–0)	Messina (0–1)	None	SECN+	11,656	2–0	
Feb. 17	Air Force	No. 2	Alex Box Stadium	17–5	**Hill** (1–0)	Nichols (0–1)	None	SECN+	11,403	3–0	
Feb. 19	Southeastern Louisiana	No. 2	Alex Box Stadium	6–5	**Peterson** (2–0)	Biddy (0–2)	None	SECN+	10,004	4–0	
Feb. 22	Bryant	No. 2	Alex Box Stadium	13–6	**Hess** (1–0)	Mattison (1–1)	None	SECN+	10,314	5–0	
Feb. 23	Bryant	No. 2	Alex Box Stadium	17–8	**Marceaux** (1–0)	Morgese (0–1)	None	SECN+	10,257	6–0	
Feb. 24	Bryant	No. 2	Alex Box Stadium	4–3	**George** (1–0)	Wrighter (0–1)	**Peterson** (1)	SECN+	10,306	7–0	
Feb. 27	Southern	No. 2	Alex Box Stadium	17–4	**Walker** (1–0)	Dixon (0–1)	None	SECN+	9,624	8–0	

March (11–9)
Date	Opponent	Rank	Site/stadium	Score	Win	Loss	Save	TV	Attendance	Overall record	SEC record
Mar. 1	at No. 22 Texas	No. 2	UFCU Disch–Falk Field; Austin, Texas	1–8	Elder (2–0)	**Hess** (1–1)	Fields (1)	LHN	7,680	8–1	
Mar. 2	at No. 22 Texas	No. 2	UFCU Disch–Falk Field	4–8	Henley (2–0)	**Marceaux** (1–1)	Quintanilla (2)	LHN	7,601	8–2	
Mar. 3	at No. 22 Texas	No. 2	UFCU Disch–Falk Field	6–7	Madden (2–0)	**Peterson** (2–1)	None	LHN	7,153	8–3	
Mar. 6	Holy Cross	No. 13	Alex Box Stadium	9–2	**George** (2–0)	McKennitt (0–2)	None	SECN+	9,718	9–3	
Mar. 8	California	No. 13	Alex Box Stadium	4–3	**Beck** (1–0)	Stoutenborough (2–2)	None	SECN+	10,468	10–3	
Mar. 9	California	No. 13	Alex Box Stadium	2–5^{7}	Holman (2–0)	**Peterson** (2–2)	Sullivan (3)	SECN+	10,882	10–4	
Mar. 9	California	No. 13	Alex Box Stadium	5–4^{7}	**Fontenot** (2–0)	Delmore (1–1)	None	SECN+	10,570	11–4	
Mar. 12	at Northwestern State	No. 13	Brown–Stroud Field; Natchitoches, Louisiana	1–3	McDonald (2–0)	**George** (2–1)	Pigott (1)	ESPN+	3,240	11–5	
Mar. 13	Texas Southern	No. 13	Alex Box Stadium	16–5	**Moffitt** (1–0)	Suarez (0–1)	None	SECN+	9,712	12–5	
Mar. 16	Kentucky	No. 13	Alex Box Stadium	2–1^{12}	**Fontenot** (3–0)	Lockhart (0–1)	None	SECN+	10,509	13–5	1–0
Mar. 16	Kentucky	No. 13	Alex Box Stadium	16–4	**Henry** (1–0)	Macciocchi (1–1)	**Vietmeier** (1)	SECN+	10,622	14–5	2–0
Mar. 17	Kentucky	No. 13	Alex Box Stadium	7–2	**Beck** (2–0)	Rigsby (0–1)	None	SECN+	10,323	15–5	3–0
Mar. 20	Nicholls	No. 10	Alex Box Stadium	5–4^{10}	**Vietmeier** (1–0)	Bollinger (0–1)	None	SECN+	10,531	16–5	
Mar. 22	at No. 5 Georgia	No. 10	Foley Field; Athens, Georgia	1–0	**Hess** (2–1)	Hancock 5–1	**Fontenot** (1)	SECN+	3,209	17–5	4–0
Mar. 23	at No. 5 Georgia	No. 10	Foley Field	0–2	Glover (1–0)	**Henry** (1–1)	Schunk (8)	SECN	3,344	17–6	4–1
Mar. 24	at No. 5 Georgia	No. 10	Foley Field	7–9	Locey (4–0)	**Walker** (1–1)	Schunk (9)	SECN	3,042	17–7	4–2
Mar. 26	McNeese State	No. 17	Alex Box Stadium	0–2	Payne (1–0)	**Hilliard** (0–1)	Dion (2)	SECN+	10,156	17–8	
Mar. 28	at No. 2 Mississippi State	No. 17	Dudy Noble Field; Starkville, Mississippi	5–6	Small (3–0)	**Hess** (2–2)	Gordon (7)	ESPNU	9,797	17–9	4–3
Mar. 29	at No. 2 Mississippi State	No. 17	Dudy Noble Field	10–5	**Henry** (2–1)	Ginn (6–1)	None	SECN	11,262	18–9	5–3
Mar. 30	at No. 2 Mississippi State	No. 17	Dudy Noble Field	11–2	**Walker** (2–1)	Plumlee (1–1)	None	SECN+	11,648	19–9	6–3

April (10–7)
Date	Opponent	Rank	Site/stadium	Score	Win	Loss	Save	TV	Attendance	Overall record	SEC record
April 2	Grambling State	No. 13	Alex Box Stadium	9–0	**Moffitt** (2–0)	Boykins, Jr. (3–1)	None	SECN+	9,804	20–9	
April 3	South Alabama	No. 13	Alex Box Stadium	2–0	**Vietmeier** (2–0)	Arguelles (0–1)	**Fontenot** (2)	SECN+	9,754	21–9	
April 5	No. 9 Texas A&M	No. 13	Alex Box Stadium	2–1	**Fontenot** (4–0)	Miller (4–1)	None	SECN+	10,547	22–9	7–3
April 6	No. 9 Texas A&M	No. 13	Alex Box Stadium	4–6	Lacy (6–0)	**Walker** (2–2)	Kalich (8)	SECN+	10,602	22–10	7–4
April 6	No. 9 Texas A&M	No. 13	Alex Box Stadium	9–3	**Henry** (3–1)	Jozwiak (3–3)	None	ESPN2	11,353	23–10	8–4
April 9	at Southern	No. 9	Lee–Hines Field; Baton Rouge, Louisiana	2–7	Finney (2–2)	**Marceaux** (1–2)	None	ESPN+	859	23–11	
April 12	at Missouri	No. 9	Taylor Stadium; Columbia, Missouri	12–11^{10}	**Peterson** (3–2)	Gubelman (2–1)	**Fontenot** (3)	SECN+	1,408	24–11	9–4
April 13	at Missouri	No. 9	Taylor Stadium	1–4	Sikkema (4–2)	**Henry** (3–2)	Bedell (3)	SECN+	1,725	24–12	9–5
April 14	at Missouri	No. 9	Taylor Stadium	5–11	Joven (3–0)	**Walker** (2–3)	None	SECN	1,002	24–13	9–6
April 16	vs. Louisiana	No. 14	Shrine on Airline; Metairie, Louisiana	5–6	Schultz (1–1)	**Vietmeier** (2–1)	None	CST	8,667	24–14	
April 18	Florida	No. 14	Alex Box Stadium	9–16	Mace (7–3)	**Hilliard** (0–2)	None	SECN	10,132	24–15	9–7
April 19	Florida	No. 14	Alex Box Stadium	13–1	**Henry** (4–2)	Scott (3–3)	**Peterson** (2)	SECN	10,766	25–15	10–7
April 20	Florida	No. 14	Alex Box Stadium	11–2	**Walker** (3–3)	Leftwich (4–3)	None	ESPN2	11,327	26–15	11–7
April 23	Lamar	No. 13	Alex Box Stadium	5–3	**Marceaux** (2–2)	Dallas (0–5)	**Fontenot** (4)	SECN+	10,364	27–15	
April 26	at Alabama	No. 13	Sewell–Thomas Stadium; Tuscaloosa, Alabama	1–6	Finnerty (6–5)	**Hess** (2–3)	None	SECN+	4,240	27–16	11–8
April 27	at Alabama	No. 13	Sewell–Thomas Stadium	5–2	**Walker** (4–3)	Love (4–4)	**Fontenot** (5)	SECN+	4,453	28–16	12–8
April 28	at Alabama	No. 13	Sewell–Thomas Stadium	5–4	**Marceaux** (3–2)	Randolph (1–2)	**Fontenot** (6)	SECN+	3,633	29–16	13–8

May (5–6)
Date	Opponent	Rank	Site/stadium	Score	Win	Loss	Save	TV	Attendance	Overall record	SEC record
May 3	No. 13 Ole Miss	No. 12	Alex Box Stadium	8–3	**Hess** (3–3)	Ethridge (5–4)	None	SECN+	11,119	30–16	14–8
May 4	No. 13 Ole Miss	No. 12	Alex Box Stadium	1–5	Nikhazy (6–3)	**Walker** (4–4)	None	SECN+	11,409	30–17	14–9
May 5	No. 13 Ole Miss	No. 12	Alex Box Stadium	15–19^{10}	Miller (4–0)	**Fontenot** (4–1)	None	ESPN2	10,671	30–18	14–10
May 7	Louisiana Tech	No. 15	Alex Box Stadium	1–12	Robbins (4–3)	**Costello** (0–1)	None	SECN+	10,304	30–19	
May 9	at No. 4 Arkansas	No. 15	Baum–Walker Stadium; Fayetteville, Arkansas	4–14	Campbell (9–1)	**Hilliard** (0–3)	None	SECN+	9,220	30–20	14–11
May 10	at No. 4 Arkansas	No. 15	Baum–Walker Stadium	6–11	Kopps (5–3)	**Hess** (3–4)	None	ESPNU	11,714	30–21	14–12
May 11	at No. 4 Arkansas	No. 15	Baum–Walker Stadium	3–2	**Peterson** (4–2)	Kostyshock (1–2)	None	ESPN2	11,037	31–21	15–12
May 14	New Orleans	No. 19	Alex Box Stadium	7–5	**Beck** (3–0)	Ramirez (1–3)	**Hess** (1)	SECN+	10,147	32–22	
May 16	Auburn	No. 19	Alex Box Stadium	7–1	**Walker** (5–4)	Anderson (5–2)	None	SECN+	10,305	33–21	16–12
May 17	Auburn	No. 19	Alex Box Stadium	5–1	**Marceaux** (4–2)	Owen (4–2)	**Hess** (2)	SECN+	11,009	34–21	17–12
May 18	Auburn	No. 19	Alex Box Stadium	4–5^{11}	Watson (1–1)	**Hess** (3–5)	Fuller (1)	SECN+	10,681	34–22	17–13

Postseason (6–4)

SEC Tournament (3–2)
Date	Opponent	Seed/Rank	Site/stadium	Score	Win	Loss	Save	TV	Attendance	Overall record	SECT record
May 21	vs. (12) South Carolina	(5) No. 16	Hoover Metropolitan Stadium; Hoover, Alabama	8–6	**Fontenot** (5–1)	Coyne (2–1)	**Peterson** (3)	SECN	10,128	35–22	1–0
May 22	vs. (4) No. 3 Mississippi State	(5) No. 16	Hoover Metropolitan Stadium	5–6^{17}	Keegan (4–1)	**Hilliard** (0–4)	None	SECN	13,902	35–23	1–1
May 23	vs. (8) Auburn	(5) No. 16	Hoover Metropolitan Stadium	4–3	**Peterson** (5–2)	Greenhill (2–3)	None	SECN	6,891	36–23	2–1
May 24	vs. (4) No. 3 Mississippi State	(5) No. 16	Hoover Metropolitan Stadium	12–2^{7}	**George** (3–1)	Ginn (8–4)	None	SECN	14,294	37–23	3–1
May 25	vs. (1) No. 2 Vanderbilt	(5) No. 16	Hoover Metropolitan Stadium	4-13	Rocker (8–5)	**Fontenot** (5–2)	None	SECN	12,872	37–24	3–2

NCAA tournament – Baton Rouge Regional (3–0)
Date	Opponent	Seed/Rank	Site/stadium	Score	Win	Loss	Save	TV	Attendance	Overall record	NCAAT record
May 31	(4) Stony Brook	(1) No. 12	Alex Box Stadium	17–3	**Marceaux** (5–2)	Marino (5–5)	None	ESPNU	10,542	38–24	1–0
June 1	(2) Southern Miss	(1) No. 12	Alex Box Stadium	8–4	**Hess** (4–5)	Carroll (3–3)	None	ESPN3	11,015	39–24	2–0
June 2	(2) Southern Miss	(1) No. 12	Alex Box Stadium	6–4	**Vietmeier** (3–1)	Lewis (1–1)	**Fontenot** (7)	ESPN3	10,718	40–24	3–0

NCAA tournament – Baton Rouge Super Regional (0–2)
Date	Opponent	Seed/Rank	Site/stadium	Score	Win	Loss	Save	TV	Attendance	Overall record	NCAAT record
June 8	Florida State	No. 12	Alex Box Stadium	**L** 4-6	Velez (4-2)	**Fontenot** (5-3)	Flowers (12)	ESPN	11,636	40-25	3-1
June 9	Florida State	No. 12	Alex Box Stadium	**L** 4-5	Velez (5-4)	**Fontenot** 5-4		ESPN2	11,713	40-26	3-2

Schedule source:

*Rankings are based on the team's current ranking in the D1Baseball poll.

== Baton Rouge Regional ==
Baton Rouge Regional Teams
(1) LSU Tigers	(2) Arizona State Sun Devils	(3) Southern Miss Golden Eagles	(4) Stony Brook Seawolves

First Round
1	LSU	17
4	Stony Brook	3
3	Southern Miss	15
2	Arizona State	3
Lower round 1
4	Stony Brook	5
2	Arizona State	13

Semi-Finals
1	LSU	8
3	Southern Miss	4
Lower final
2	Arizona State	12
3	Southern Miss	13

Finals
1	LSU
3	Southern Miss

== Record vs. conference opponents ==
Last two do not qualify for conf. tourn. Blank are not scheduled. Blue are home games, otherwise away.

2019 SEC baseball records Source: 2019 SEC baseball game results
Team	W–L	ALA	ARK	AUB	FLA	UGA	KEN	LSU	MSU	MIZZ	MISS	SCAR	TENN	TAMU	VAN	Team	Div	SR	SW
ALA	7–23		1–2	1–2	0–3	0–3	.	1–2	0–3	.	1–2	2–1	.	1–2	0–3	ALA	W7	1–9	0–4
ARK	20–10	2–1		2–1	.	.	2–1	3–0	2–1	3–0	1–2	.	3–0	1–2	1–2	ARK	W1	7–3	3–0
AUB	14–16	2–1	1–2		.	1–2	.	1–2	1–2	.	2–1	2–1	3–0	1–2	0–3	AUB	W6	4–6	1–1
FLA	13–17	3–0	.	.		0–3	2–1	1–2	1–2	3–0	0–3	2–1	1–2	.	0–3	FLA	E5	4–6	2–3
UGA	21–9	3–0	.	2–1	3–0		2–1	2–1	0–3	3–0	.	3–0	1–2	.	2–1	UGA	E2	8–2	4–1
KEN	7–23	.	1–2	.	1–2	1–2		0–3	.	1–2	2–1	1–2	0–3	0–3	0–3	KEN	E7	1–9	0–4
LSU	17–13	2–1	0–3	2–1	2–1	1–2	3–0		3–0	1–2	1–2	.	.	2–1	.	LSU	W3	6–4	2–1
MSU	20–10	3–0	1–2	2–1	2–1	3–0	.	0–3		.	3–0	2–1	2–1	2–1	.	MSU	W2	8–2	3–1
MIZZ	13–16	.	0–3	.	0–3	0–3	2–1	2–1	.		2–1	3–0	2–1	1–1	1–2	MIZZ	E4	5–4	1–3
MISS	16–14	2–1	2–1	1–2	3–0	.	1–2	2–1	0–3	1–2		.	1–2	3–0	.	MISS	W5	5–5	2–1
SCAR	8–22	1–2	.	1–2	1–2	0–3	2–1	.	1–2	0–3	.		1–2	1–2	0–3	SCAR	E6	1–9	0–3
TENN	14–16	.	0–3	0–3	2–1	2–1	3–0	.	1–2	1–2	2–1	2–1		.	1–2	TENN	E3	5–5	1–2
TAMU	16–13	2–1	2–1	2–1	.	.	3–0	1–2	1–2	1–1	0–3	2–1	.		2–1	TAMU	W4	6–3	1–1
VAN	23–7	3–0	2–1	3–0	3–0	1–2	3–0	.	.	2–1	.	3–0	2–1	1–2		VAN	E1	8–2	5–0
Team	W–L	ALA	ARK	AUB	FLA	UGA	KEN	LSU	MSU	MIZZ	MISS	SCAR	TENN	TAMU	VAN	Team	Div	SR	SW

Updated for entire regular season. Missouri at Texas A&M series had one tie game.

== Rankings ==
Ranking movements Legend: ██ Increase in ranking ██ Decrease in ranking
	Week																
Poll	Pre	1	2	3	4	5	6	7	8	9	10	11	12	13	14	15	Final
Coaches'	1	1*	1	9	13	11	15	12	8	14	16	14	17	20	17	17	16
Baseball America	2	2	2	10	11	12	17	15	12	15	14	12	16	22	16	15	15
Collegiate Baseball^	1	1	1	9	10	7	12	9	8	15	15	13	18	20	21	19	14
NCBWA†	2	1	1	9	10	9	14	11	8	13	14	14	16	21	19	16	15
D1Baseball	2	2	2	13	13	10	17	13	9	14	13	12	15	19	16	12	14

^ Collegiate Baseball ranked 40 teams in their preseason poll, but only ranked 30 teams weekly during the season.
† NCBWA ranks 30 teams in their preseason poll, but only ranks 25 teams weekly during the season.
* A new poll was not released for this week, so for comparison purposes, the previous week's ranking is inserted in this week's slot.

== 2019 MLB draft ==
Player	Position	Round	Overall	MLB team
Josh Smith	SS	2	67	New York Yankees
Zach Watson	OF	3	79	Baltimore Orioles
Zack Hess	RHP	7	202	Detroit Tigers
Todd Peterson	RHP	7	213	Washington Nationals
Antoine Duplantis	OF	12	358	New York Mets
