= 2019 Lamar Cardinals baseball team =

American college baseball season

2019 Lamar Cardinals baseball
- Conference: Southland Conference
- Record: 18–36 (9–21 SLC)
- Head coach: Will Davis (3rd season)
- Assistant coaches: Scott Hatten; Sean Snedeker; Justin Echols (Volunteer Asst)
- Home stadium: Vincent–Beck Stadium

2019 Southland Conference baseball standings
	Conf.				Overall
Team	W		L	PCT	W		L	PCT
Sam Houston State ‍†‍‍	20	–	10	.667	31	–	25	.554
Southeastern Louisiana ‍‍‍	19	–	11	.633	33	–	27	.550
Central Arkansas ‍‍‍	19	–	11	.633	32	–	27	.542
Incarnate Word ‍‍‍	18	–	12	.600	37	–	22	.627
McNeese State ‍‍‡‍^{y}	16	–	14	.533	35	–	26	.574
Stephen F. Austin ‍‍‍	16	–	14	.533	25	–	33	.431
Northwestern State ‍‍‍	15	–	15	.500	30	–	25	.545
Texas A&M–Corpus Christi ‍‍‍	14	–	16	.467	31	–	26	.544
New Orleans ‍‍‍	13	–	17	.433	29	–	27	.518
Abilene Christian ‍‍‍	13	–	17	.433	26	–	26	.500
Nicholls ‍‍‍	13	–	17	.433	27	–	28	.491
Houston Baptist ‍‍‍	10	–	20	.333	18	–	35	.340
Lamar ‍‍‍	9	–	21	.300	18	–	36	.333
† – Conference champion ‡ – Tournament champion y – Invited to the NCAA tournament As of June 5, 2019; Rankings from D1Baseball

The 2019 Lamar Cardinals baseball team represented Lamar University during the 2019 NCAA Division I baseball season as members of the Southland Conference. The Cardinals played their home games at Vincent–Beck Stadium and were led by third–year head coach Will Davis. The team compiled a 18–36 overall record and were 9–21 in conference play finishing in thirteenth place (last). They failed to qualify for the SLC tournament.

== Schedule and results ==
Legend
	Lamar win
	Lamar loss
	Postponement/Cancelation/Suspensions
**Bold**	Lamar team member
*	Non-Conference game
†	Make-Up Game

2019 Lamar Cardinals baseball game log
Regular season (18–36)

February (4–5)
Date	Opponent	Rank	Site/stadium	Score	Win	Loss	Save	Attendance	Overall record	SLC Record
Feb. 15	LIU Brooklyn*		Vincent–Beck Stadium • Beaumont, TX	6–2	**Blanchard, Jason (1–0)**	PEDERSON, Zach (0–1)	**Dallas, Jack (1)**	913	1–0	
Feb. 16	LIU Brooklyn*		Vincent–Beck Stadium • Beaumont, TX	2–1	**Smith, Austin (1–0)**	GRISWOLD, Rob (0–1)	**Erickson, Ryan (1)**	855	2–0	
Feb. 16	LIU Brooklyn*		Vincent–Beck Stadium • Beaumont, TX	8–4	**Wright, Grason (1–0)**	CLYNE, Patrick (0–1)	**Palmer, Douglas (1)**	855	3–0	
Feb. 19	at Tulane*		Greer Field at Turchin Stadium • New Orleans, LA	1–9	BATES, Josh (1–0)	**Dallas, Jack (0–1)**	None	1,313	3–1	
Feb. 20	at Tulane*		Greer Field at Turchin Stadium • New Orleans, LA	10–22	Tr. JOHNSON (1–0)	**Johnson, Dylan (0–1)**	None	1,223	3–2	
Cardinal Classic
Feb. 22	Central Michigan*		Vincent–Beck Stadium • Beaumont, TX	2–4	BROWN, Cameron (2–0)	**Blanchard, Jason (1–1)**	MILLER, Cameron (2)	811	3–3	
Feb. 23	Prairie View A&M*		Vincent–Beck Stadium • Beaumont, TX	7–6	**Palmer, Douglas (1–0)**	Tyler Laux (1–1)	None	823	4–3	
Feb. 24	Central Michigan*		Vincent–Beck Stadium • Beaumont, TX	6–10	KOHN, Zach (2–0)	**Wright, Grason (1–1)**	None	727	4–4	
Feb. 23	BYU*		Vincent–Beck Stadium • Beaumont, TX	2–4	MCLAUGHLIN, Reid (2–0)	**Erickson, Ryan (0–1)**	ZIMMERMAN, Drew (1)	417	4–5	

March (5–13)
Date	Opponent	Rank	Site/stadium	Score	Win	Loss	Save	Attendance	Overall record	SLC Record
Mar. 1	BYU*		Vincent–Beck Stadium • Beaumont, TX	3–1	**Blanchard, Jason (2–1)**	LESSAR, Jarod (1–1)	**Ozorio-Brace, AJ (1)**	1,091	5–5	
Mar. 2	BYU*		Vincent–Beck Stadium • Beaumont, TX	0–4	STERNER, Justin (2–1)	**Sills, Noah (0–1)**	None	712	5–6	
Mar. 5	at Houston Baptist*		Husky Field • Houston, TX	6–3	**Ozorio-Brace, AJ (1–0)**	Pronger, Brent (0–1)	None	227	6–6	
Mar. 8	Stephen F. Austin		Vincent–Beck Stadium • Beaumont, TX	1–4	Palmer, Alex (1–1)	**Blanchard, Jason (2–2)**	Rodriguez, Jeremy (3)	812	6–7	0–1
Mar. 9	Stephen F. Austin		Vincent–Beck Stadium • Beaumont, TX	2–4	Covington, Jaxon (2–0)	**Sills, Noah (0–2)**	Gamez, Jesus (1)	799	6–8	0–2
Mar. 10	Stephen F. Austin		Vincent–Beck Stadium • Beaumont, TX	3–5	Stobart, Jacob (2–0)	**Rich, Taylor (0–1)**	Gamez, Jesus (2)	854	6–9	0–3
Mar. 12	at Rice*		Reckling Park • Houston, TX	5–12	Lewis (1–0)	Dallas, Jack (0–2)	None	2,102	6–10	
Mar. 15	at McNeese		Joe Miller Ballpark • Lake Charles, LA	1–6	Deaton, Rhett (3–1)	**Sills, Noah (0–3)**	Kincaid, Brad (1)	877	6–11	0–4
Mar. 16	at McNeese		Joe Miller Ballpark • Lake Charles, LA	2–1	**Erickson, Ryan (1–1)**	King, Bryan (2–1)	Smith, Austin (1)	973	7–11	1–4
Mar. 17	at McNeese		Joe Miller Ballpark • Lake Charles, LA	4–6	Dion, Will (2–0)	**Wright, Grason (1–2)**	None	908	7–12	1–5
Mar. 19	Southern University*		Vincent–Beck Stadium • Beaumont, TX	6–5	**Smith, Austin (2–0)**	Whilhelm Allen (1–2)	None	612	8–12	
Mar. 22	at Northwestern State		H. Alvin Brown–C. C. Stroud Field • Natchitoches, LA	4–3	**Sills, Noah (1–3)**	Heisler, Ridge (2–2)	**Ozorio-Brace, AJ (2)**	403	9–12	2–5
Mar. 23	at Northwestern State		H. Alvin Brown–C. C. Stroud Field • Natchitoches, LA	2–5	Maddox, Jerry (1–1)	**Blanchard, Jason (2–3)**	Vasquez, Jose (1)	424	9–13	2–6
Mar. 24	at Northwestern State		H. Alvin Brown–C. C. Stroud Field • Natchitoches, LA	6–10	Jones, Nathan (3–1)	**Johnson, Dylan (0–2)**	McDonald, Cullen (1)	410	9–14	2–7
Mar. 26	at #11 Texas A&M*		Olsen Field at Blue Bell Park • College Station, TX	7–10	Birdsell, Brandon (1–0)	**Dallas, Jack (0–3)**	None	4,398	9–15	
Mar. 29	Nicholls		Vincent–Beck Stadium • Beaumont, TX	2–4	Kilcrease, Trever (2–1)	**Sills, Noah (1–4)**	Kramer, Colin (1)	854	9–16	2–8
Mar. 30	Nicholls		Vincent–Beck Stadium • Beaumont, TX	4–5	Andrews, Brandon (1–2)	**Erickson, Ryan (1–2)**	None	763	9–17	2–9
Mar. 31	Nicholls		Vincent–Beck Stadium • Beaumont, TX	5–6	Harrison, Matthew (1–0)	**Dallas, Jack (0–4)**	Kramer, Colin (2)	763	9–18	2–10

April (6–11)
Date	Opponent	Rank	Site/stadium	Score	Win	Loss	Save	Attendance	Overall record	SLC Record
Apr. 2	Houston*		Vincent–Beck Stadium • Beaumont, TX	7–8	ROEDAHL, Devon (5–2)	**Erickson, Ryan (1–3)**	VILLARREAL, Fred (6)	805	9–19	
Apr. 3	Houston Baptist*		Vincent–Beck Stadium • Beaumont, TX	11–1	**Hranicky, Josh (1–0)**	J. Coats (3–2)	None	602	10–19	
Apr. 5	at Sam Houston State		Don Sanders Stadium • Huntsville, TX	6–15	Wesneski, Hayden (5–0)	**Sills, Noah (1–5)**	Beard, Steven (1)	834	10–20	2–11
Apr. 6	at Sam Houston State		Don Sanders Stadium • Huntsville, TX	5–6	Mikolajchak, Nick (2–3)	**Smith, Austin (2–1)**	None	834	10–21	2–12
Apr. 6	at Sam Houston State		Don Sanders Stadium • Huntsville, TX	4–8	Ballew, Seth (2–1)	**Wright, Grason (1–3)**	Mikolajchak, Nick (4)	823	10–22	2–13
Apr. 9	at UTSA*		Roadrunner Field • San Antonio, TX	2–25 (7 inn)	DAUGHETY (2–2)	**Johnson, Dylan (0–3)**	None	244	10–23	
Apr. 12	Texas A&M–Corpus Christi		Vincent–Beck Stadium • Beaumont, TX	9–1	**Sills, Noah (2–5)**	Lacaze, Dustin (3–2)	None	807	11–23	3–13
Apr. 13	Texas A&M–Corpus Christi		Vincent–Beck Stadium • Beaumont, TX	7–3	**Blanchard, Jason (3–3)**	Perez, Leo (1–1)	None	718	12–23	4–13
Apr. 14	Texas A&M–Corpus Christi		Vincent–Beck Stadium • Beaumont, TX	10–4	**Wright, Grason (2–3)**	LeCompte, Cody (4–2)	**Dallas, Jack (2)**	723	13–23	5–13
Apr. 16	at Texas*		UFCU Disch–Falk Field • Austin, TX	2–7	Bocchi, Matteo (2–0)	**Ozorio-Brace, AJ (1–1)**	None	4,706	13–24	
Apr. 18	at Abilene Christian		Crutcher Scott Field • Abilene, TX	4–6	Chirpich, Spencer (6–2)	**Sills, Noah (2–6)**	Lewis, Brennan (8)	500	13–25	5–14
Apr. 19	at Abilene Christian		Crutcher Scott Field • Abilene, TX	13–1	**Blanchard, Jason (4–3)**	Barger, Brock (2–5)	None	500	14–25	6–14
Apr. 20	at Abilene Christian		Crutcher Scott Field • Abilene, TX	5–6	Nicholson, Jonathan (4–4)	**Wright, Grason (2–4)**	Lewis, Brennan (9)	500	14–26	6–15
Apr. 23	at LSU*		Alex Box Stadium, Skip Bertman Field • Baton Rouge, LA	4–6	Marceaux (2–2)	**Dallas, Jack (0–5)**	Fontenot (4)	10,364	14–27	
Apr. 26	at New Orleans		Maestri Field at Privateer Park • New Orleans, LA	5–6	Mitchell, Brandon (2-3)	**Erickson, Ryan (2-3)**	Martin, Reeves (12)	198	14–28	6–16
Apr. 27	at New Orleans		Maestri Field at Privateer Park • New Orleans, LA	6–7	Oset, Mathew (6-1)	**Dallas, Jack (0-6)**	None	303	14–29	6–17
Apr. 28	at New Orleans		Maestri Field at Privateer Park • New Orleans, LA	4–2	**Hranicky, Josh (2-0)**	Swift, Steven (1-3)	**Johnson, Dylan (1)**	263	15–29	7–17
Apr. 30	at Baylor*		Baylor Ballpark • Waco, TX	–		Cancelled			–	

May (3–7)
Date	Opponent	Rank	Site/stadium	Score	Win	Loss	Save	Attendance	Overall record	SLC Record
May 3	Southeastern Louisiana		Vincent–Beck Stadium • Beaumont, TX	3–4	Biddy, Jared (1–2)	**Johnson, Dylan (0–4)**	None	612	15–30	7–18
May 4	Southeastern Louisiana		Vincent–Beck Stadium • Beaumont, TX	13–9	**Blanchard, Jason (5–3)**	Knopp, Mason (6–2)	None	612	16–30	8–18
May 5	Southeastern Louisiana		Vincent–Beck Stadium • Beaumont, TX	4–6	Granier, Kade (2–2)	**Dallas, Jack (0–7)**	Biddy, Jared (8)	735	16–31	8–19
May 7	Rice*		Vincent–Beck Stadium • Beaumont, TX	–		Cancelled			–	
May 10	at Gonzaga*		Washington Trust Field and Patterson Baseball Complex • Spokane, WA	6–7	JACOB, A. (7–3)	**Erickson, Ryan (1–5)**	None	613	16–32	
May 11	at Gonzaga*		Washington Trust Field and Patterson Baseball Complex • Spokane, WA	0–16	LARDNER, Mac (5–3)	**Blanchard, Jason (5–4)**	None	909	16–33	
May 12	at Gonzaga*		Washington Trust Field and Patterson Baseball Complex • Spokane, WA	4–22	BLATNER, Justin (2–3)	**Wright, Grason (2–5)**	None	652	16–34	
May 14	at TCU*		Lupton Stadium • Fort Worth, TX	10–5	**Erickson, Ryan (2–5)**	Janczak (0–3)	None	5,546	17–34	
May 16	Central Arkansas		Vincent–Beck Stadium • Beaumont, TX	2–7	Davenport, Cody (6–4)	**Johnson, Dylan (0–5)**	None	611	17–35	8–20
May 17	Central Arkansas		Vincent–Beck Stadium • Beaumont, TX	3–2	**Sills, Noah (3–6)**	Stone, Gavin (3–3)	None	723	18–35	9–20
May 18	Central Arkansas		Vincent–Beck Stadium • Beaumont, TX	3–4	Moyer, Mark (3–3)	**Wright, Grason (2–6)**	Williams, Conner (2)	745	18–36	9–21

Legend: = Win = Loss = Canceled
Bold = Lamar team member
Rankings are based on the team's current ranking in the D1Baseball poll.

|}
