= 2019 Big 12 Conference baseball tournament =

American college baseball tournament

- Teams: 8
- Format: Double-elimination tournament
- Finals site: Chickasaw Bricktown Ballpark; Oklahoma City, OK
- Champions: Oklahoma State (3rd title)
- Winning coach: Josh Holliday (2nd title)
- MVP: Colin Simpson (Oklahoma State)
- Television: Bracket Play: FCS Central; Championship: FSN

2019 Big 12 Conference baseball standings
	Conf.				Overall
Team	W		L	PCT	W		L	PCT
No. 4 Texas Tech ‍†‍‍^{y}	16	–	8	.667	46	–	20	.697
No. 23 Baylor ‍‍‍^{y}	14	–	8	.636	35	–	19	.648
No. 11 Oklahoma State ‍‍‡‍^{y}	14	–	9	.609	40	–	21	.656
No. 27 West Virginia ‍‍‍^{y}	13	–	11	.542	38	–	22	.633
Kansas ‍‍‍	12	–	12	.500	32	–	26	.552
TCU ‍‍‍^{y}	11	–	13	.458	34	–	28	.548
Oklahoma ‍‍‍	11	–	13	.458	33	–	23	.589
Kansas State ‍‍‍	8	–	16	.333	25	–	33	.431
Texas ‍‍‍	7	–	16	.304	27	–	27	.500
† – Conference champion ‡ – Tournament champion y – Invited to the NCAA tournament Rankings from Collegiate Baseball

The 2019 Big 12 Conference baseball tournament was held from May 22 through 26 at Chickasaw Bricktown Ballpark in Oklahoma City, Oklahoma. The annual tournament determined the conference champion of the Division I Big 12 Conference for college baseball. The winner of the tournament, Oklahoma State, earned the league's automatic bid to the 2019 NCAA Division I baseball tournament.

The tournament has been held since 1997, the inaugural year of the Big 12 Conference. Among current league members, Texas has won the most championships with five. Among original members, Kansas State has never won the event. Baylor won their first championship in 2018. Iowa State discontinued their program after the 2001 season without having won a title. Having joined in 2013, TCU won their first title in 2014 while West Virginia has yet to win the Tournament.

== Format and seeding ==
The top eight finishers from the regular season were seeded one through eight, and then played a two-bracket double-elimination tournament leading to a winner-take-all championship game.

Place	Seed	Team	Conference				Overall		
Place	Seed	Team	W	L	%	GB	W	L	%
1	1	Texas Tech	16	8	.667	–	46	20	.697
2	2	Baylor	14	8	.636	1	35	19	.648
3	3	Oklahoma State	14	9	.609	1.5	40	21	.656
4	4	West Virginia	13	11	.542	3	38	22	.633
5	5	Kansas	12	12	.500	4	32	26	.552
6	6	TCU	11	13	.458	5	34	28	.548
6	7	Oklahoma	11	13	.458	5	33	23	.589
8	8	Kansas State	8	16	.333	8	25	33	.431
9	–	Texas	7	16	.304	8.5	27	27	.500

== Results ==
First round
1	Texas Tech	7
8	Kansas State	4
4	West Virginia	12
5	Kansas	8
8	Kansas State	14^{11}
5	Kansas	15
3	Oklahoma State	5
6	TCU	2
2	Baylor	8
7	Oklahoma	2
6	TCU	15
7	Oklahoma	3

Second round
1	Texas Tech	1
4	West Virginia	5
5	Kansas	5
1	Texas Tech	7
3	Oklahoma State	5
2	Baylor	0
6	TCU	5
2	Baylor	2

Semifinals
4	West Virginia	3	2
1	Texas Tech	10	0
3	Oklahoma State	6	7
6	TCU	13	6^{10}

Finals
4	West Virginia	2
3	Oklahoma State	5

== Conference championship ==
Big 12 Championship
(4) West Virginia Mountaineers	vs.	(3) Oklahoma State Cowboys

May 26, 2019, 1:15 p.m. (CDT) at Chickasaw Bricktown Ballpark in Oklahoma City, Oklahoma
Team	1	2	3	4	5	6	7	8	9	R	H	E
(4) West Virginia	0	0	1	0	0	0	0	0	1	2	8	2
(3) Oklahoma State	0	0	0	0	3	0	0	2	X	5	6	0
WP: Brett Standlee (3–1) LP: Madison Jeffrey (0–1) Sv: Peyton Battenfield (3)

== All-Tournament Team ==
Position	Player	School
C	Zach Humphreys	TCU
1B	Cameron Warren	Texas Tech
2B	Tyler Doanes	West Virginia
SS	Andrew Navigato	Oklahoma State
3B	Skyler Messinger	Kansas
OF	Cade Cabbinees	Oklahoma State
OF	Josh Watson	TCU
OF	Brandon White	West Virginia
DH	Colin Simpson	Oklahoma State
SP	Ryan Bergert	West Virginia
SP	Jensen Elliott	Oklahoma State
SP	Alek Manoah	West Virginia
RP	Dane Haveman	Texas Tech
MOP	Colin Simpson	Oklahoma State
