= 2019 TCU Horned Frogs baseball team =

American college baseball season

2019 TCU Horned Frogs baseball

Fayetteville Regional, 2–2
- Conference: Big 12 Conference
- Record: 34–28 (11–13 Big 12)
- Head coach: Jim Schlossnagle (16th season)
- Assistant coaches: Bill Mosiello (6th season); Kirk Saarloos (7th season); John Dilaura (1st season)
- Home stadium: Lupton Stadium

2019 Big 12 Conference baseball standings
	Conf.				Overall
Team	W		L	PCT	W		L	PCT
No. 4 Texas Tech ‍†‍‍^{y}	16	–	8	.667	46	–	20	.697
No. 23 Baylor ‍‍‍^{y}	14	–	8	.636	35	–	19	.648
No. 11 Oklahoma State ‍‍‡‍^{y}	14	–	9	.609	40	–	21	.656
No. 27 West Virginia ‍‍‍^{y}	13	–	11	.542	38	–	22	.633
Kansas ‍‍‍	12	–	12	.500	32	–	26	.552
TCU ‍‍‍^{y}	11	–	13	.458	34	–	28	.548
Oklahoma ‍‍‍	11	–	13	.458	33	–	23	.589
Kansas State ‍‍‍	8	–	16	.333	25	–	33	.431
Texas ‍‍‍	7	–	16	.304	27	–	27	.500
† – Conference champion ‡ – Tournament champion y – Invited to the NCAA tournament Rankings from Collegiate Baseball

The 2019 TCU Horned Frogs baseball team represented Texas Christian University during the 2019 NCAA Division I baseball season. The Horned Frogs played their home games at Charlie & Marie Lupton Baseball Stadium as a member of the Big 12 Conference. They were led by head coach Jim Schlossnagle, the winningest coach in TCU baseball history, in his 16th year at TCU.

== Previous season ==
On the heels of four consecutive trips to the College World Series, the 2018 TCU Horned Frogs baseball team entered the season with high expectations, ranking as high as No. 4 in the preseason polls. However, the team did not live up to the lofty expectations, posting a record of 33–23, including a disappointing 10–13 in conference play. Nevertheless, the Horned Frogs, entering the Big 12 tournament as the six seed, fought to the final where they fell 5–6 to the Baylor Bears in 11-innings. Despite their impressive Big 12 Tournament showing, TCU failed to make the 2018 NCAA Division I baseball tournament.

== Preseason ==
=== MLB draft ===
The following Horned Frogs on the 2018 roster were selected in the 2018 Major League Baseball draft:

List of Drafted Players
Name	2018 Class	Pos.	Team	Round	Signed/Returned
Luken Baker	Junior	1B	St. Louis Cardinals	2nd	Signed
Durbin Feltman	Junior	RHP	Boston Red Sox	3rd	Signed
Sean Wymer	Junior	RHP	Toronto Blue Jays	4th	Signed
Jared Janczak	Junior	RHP	Los Angeles Angels	32nd	Did not sign
Josh Watson	Junior	OF	Milwaukee Brewers	35th	Did not sign

* indicates draftee had no more college eligibility

=== Departed Players ===
The following Horned Frogs on the 2017 roster departed the program prior to the 2018 season:

List of Departed Players
Name	2017 Class	Pos.	Reason
Coby Boulware	Freshman	2B	Transferred to Arkansas
Tristan Hanoian	Freshman	INF	Transferred to Orange Coast College
Danny Crews	Junior	INF	Departed

== Schedule and results ==
2019 TCU Horned Frogs Baseball Schedule & Results
Regular season
February

Date	Time (CT)	TV	Opponent	Rank	Stadium	Score	Win	Loss	Save	Attendance	Overall	Big 12	
February 15	3:00 pm		No. 18 Cal State Fullerton*	No. 19	Salt River Fields at Talking Stick • Scottsdale, AZ • MLB4 Tournament	**L** 0–2	Bibee {1–0)	**Lodolo** (0–1)	Weisberg (1)		0–1	–	Stats; Story
February 16	7:00 pm		Virginia*	No. 19	Salt River Fields at Talking Stick • Scottsdale, AZ • MLB4 Tournament	**W** 9–4	**Mihlbauer** (1–0)	Vasil (0–1)	–	2,176	1–1	–	Stats; Story
February 17	1:00 pm		No. 2 Vanderbilt*	No. 19	Salt River Fields at Talking Stick • Scottsdale, AZ • MLB4 Tournament	**W** 10–2	**Eissler** (1–0)	Rocker (0–1)	–		2–1	–	Stats; Story
February 20	6:30 pm		Abilene Christian*	No. 16	Lupton Stadium • Fort Worth, TX	**W** 12–4	**Arrighetti** (1–0)	Brager (0–1)	–	3,915	3–1	–	Stats; Story
February 22	6:30 pm		Grand Canyon*	No. 16	Lupton Stadium • Fort Worth, TX	**L** 1–4	Mechals (2–0)	**Lodolo** (0–2)	Ohanian (1)	3,592	3–2	–	Stats; Story
February 23	3:00 pm		Grand Canyon*	No. 16	Lupton Stadium • Fort Worth, TX	**W** 17–9	**Eissler** (2–0)	Ohl (1–1)	–	4,221	4–2	–	Stats; Story
February 24	1:00 pm		Grand Canyon*	No. 16	Lupton Stadium • Fort Worth, TX	**W** 6–5	**Williamson** (1–0)	Scalzo (0–2)	**Perez** (1)	3,765	5–2	–	Stats; Story

March

Date	Time (CT)	TV	Opponent	Rank	Stadium	Score	Win	Loss	Save	Attendance	Overall	Big 12	
March 1	3:00 pm	AT&TSN	Houston*	No. 19	Minute Maid Park • Houston, TX • Shriners College Classic	**W** 10–6	**Lodolo** (1–2)	Bielamowicz (0–1)	**King** (1)		6–2	–	Stats; Story
March 2	7:00 pm	AT&TSN	No. 23 Texas A&M*	No. 19	Minute Maid Park • Houston, TX • Shriners College Classic	**L** 0–1	Lacy (3–0)	**Williamson** (2–1)	Kalich (4)		6–3	–	Stats; Story
March 3	7:00 pm	AT&TSN	Rice*	No. 19	Minute Maid Park • Houston, TX • Shriners College Classic	**L** 2–12	Parthasarthy (2–1)	**Janczak** (0–1)	–		6–4	–	Stats; Story
March 5	3:00 pm	HFTV	Stephen F. Austin*		Lupton Stadium • Fort Worth, TX	**W** 19–3	**Green** (1–0)	Mangus (0–1)	–	3,490	7–4	–	Stats; Story
March 8	8:00 pm		Long Beach State*		Blair Field • Long Beach, CA	**W** 4–1	**Lodolo** (2–2)	Baayoun (0–3)	**Perez** (2)	1,359	8–4	–	Stats; Story
March 9	8:00 pm		Long Beach State*		Blair Field • Long Beach, CA	**L** 3–14	Seminaris (1–2)	**Eissler** (2–1)	–	1,475	8–5	–	Stats; Story
March 10	3:00 pm		Long Beach State*		Blair Field • Long Beach, CA	**W** 10–4	**King** (1–0)	Pacheco (1–2)	–	1,893	9–5	–	Stats; Story
March 12	8:00 pm		San Diego*		Fowler Park • San Diego, CA	**L** 6–9	Miller (2–1)	**Mihlbauer** (1–1)	Dolak (2)	550	9–6	–	Stats; Story
March 15	6:30 pm	HFTV	Eastern Michigan*		Lupton Stadium • Fort Worth, TX	**W** 12–2	**Lodolo** (3–2)	Granzotto (1–3)	–	3,686	10–6	–	Stats; Story
March 16	5:00 pm	HFTV	Eastern Michigan*		Lupton Stadium • Fort Worth, TX	**W** 16–4	**Eissler** (3–1)	Porretto (0–2)	–	3,597	11–6	–	Stats; Story
March 17	1:00 pm	HFTV	Eastern Michigan*		Lupton Stadium • Fort Worth, TX	**W** 12–1	**Williamson** (2–1)	Meis (0–4)	–	4,187	12–6	–	Stats; Story
March 19	7:00 pm		UT Arlington*		Globe Life Park in Arlington • Arlington, TX	**W** 5–3	**Green** (2–0)	Gomez (0–1)	**Perez** (3)	1,696	13–6	–	Stats; Story
March 22	6:30 pm	FSSW+	No. 17 Texas		Lupton Stadium • Fort Worth, TX	**W** 3–2	**Perez** (1–0)	Fields (1–1)	–	5,590	14–6	1–0	Stats; Story
March 23	7:30 pm	ESPNU	No. 17 Texas		Lupton Stadium • Fort Worth, TX	**L** 1–13	Henley (3–1)	**Eissler** (3–2)	–	5,211	14–7	1–1	Stats; Story
March 24	1:00 pm	FSSW+	No. 17 Texas		Lupton Stadium • Fort Worth, TX	**W** 12–8	**Perez** (2–0)	Quintanilla (1–1)	–	4,498	15–7	2–1	Stats; Story
March 26	5:00 pm	FSSW+	UTRGV*	No. 28	Lupton Stadium • Fort Worth, TX	**W** 6–2	**Arrighetti** (2–0)	Hollas (0–3)	–	3,442	16–7	2–1	Stats; Story
March 29	6:30 pm	FSSW	Oklahoma State	No. 28	Lupton Stadium • Fort Worth, TX	**W** 7–4	**Lodolo** (4–2)	Elliott (3–1)	**Perez** (4)	4,299	17–7	3–1	Stats; Story
March 30	2:00 pm	FSSW	Oklahoma State	No. 28	Lupton Stadium • Fort Worth, TX	**L** 6–7	Leeper (3–0)	**Perez** (2–1)	–	4,448	17–8	3–2	Stats; Story
March 31	2:00 pm	HFTV	Oklahoma State	No. 28	Lupton Stadium • Fort Worth, TX	**L** 8–9	Lyons (2–2)	**King** (1–1)	Leeper (4)	4,308	17–9	3–3	Stats; Story

April

Date	Time (CT)	TV	Opponent	Rank	Stadium	Score	Win	Loss	Save	Attendance	Overall	Big 12	
April 2	6:30 pm	HFTV	UT Arlington*	No. 25	Lupton Stadium • Fort Worth, TX	**W** 3–2	**Coughlin** (1–0)	Gross (0–1)	–	3,820	18–9	3–3	Stats; Story
April 5	6:00 pm	FSSW	Oklahoma	No. 25	Mitchell Park • Norman, OK	**L** 6–7	Ruffcorn (1–1)	**Eissler** (3–3)	–	1,389	18–10	3–4	Stats; Story
April 6	5:00 pm		Oklahoma	No. 25	Mitchell Park • Norman, OK	**W** 4–2	**King** (2–1)	Olds (0–2)	**Perez** (5)	1,662	19–10	4–4	Stats; Story
April 7	1:00 pm		Oklahoma	No. 25	Mitchell Park • Norman, OK	**W** 6–4	**Williamson** (3–1)	Prater (5–3)	**Notary** (1)	1,012	20–10	5–4	Stats; Story
April 9	3:00 pm		Dallas Baptist*	No. 22	Horner Ballpark • Dallas, TX	**L** 6–11	Reeves (1–0)	**Green** (2–1)	–	1,542	20–11	5–4	Stats; Story
April 12	3:00 pm		Seton Hall*	No. 22	Lupton Stadium • Fort Worth, TX	**W** 5–1	**Lodolo** (5–2)	DeVito (1–3)	–	3,695	21–11	5–4	Stats; Story
April 12	6:30 pm	HFTV	Seton Hall*	No. 22	Lupton Stadium • Fort Worth, TX	**W** 8–6	**Perez** (3–1)	Patten (1–3)	–	3,952	22–11	5–4	Stats; Story
April 14	1:00 pm	HFTV	Seton Hall*	No. 22	Lupton Stadium • Fort Worth, TX	**L** 3–7	Thompson (3–1)	**Williamson** (3–2)	–	3,919	22–12	5–4	Stats; Story
April 16	6:40 pm		No. 29 UT Arlington*	No. 20	Clay Gould Ballpark • Arlington, TX	**L** 3–6	Anderson (6–3)	**Janczak** (0–2)	Gross (15)	730	22–13	5–4	Stats; Story
April 18	6:00 pm	ESPN3	Kansas State	No. 20	Tointon Family Stadium • Manhattan, KS	**L** 4–7	Hassall (2–1)	**Lodolo** (5–3)	–	1,285	22–14	5–5	Stats; Story
April 19	6:00 pm	ESPN3	Kansas State	No. 20	Tointon Family Stadium • Manhattan, KS	**W** 8–1	**King** (3–1)	Ford (0–4)	–	1,683	23–14	6–5	Stats; Story
April 20	4:00 pm	ESPN3	Kansas State	No. 20	Tointon Family Stadium • Manhattan, KS	**L** 10–11	Brennan (3–4)	**Mihlbauer** (1–2)	–	1,901	23–15	6–6	Stats; Story
April 23	3:00 pm	HFTV	Dallas Baptist*		Lupton Stadium • Fort Worth, TX	**L** 3–9	Stone (1–0)	**Eissler** (3–4)	–	3,936	23–16	6–6	Stats; Story
April 26	6:30 pm	HFTV	No. 23 Baylor		Lupton Stadium • Fort Worth, TX	**L** 3–6	Leckich (3–0)	**Lodolo** (5–4)	Hill (6)	4,816	23–17	6–7	Stats; Story
April 27	3:00 pm	FSSW	No. 23 Baylor		Lupton Stadium • Fort Worth, TX	**L** 2–15	Winston (4–1)	**King** (3–2)	–	5,556	23–18	6–8	Stats; Story
April 28	1:00 pm	HFTV	No. 23 Baylor		Lupton Stadium • Fort Worth, TX	**L** 1–12	Ashkinos (2–2)	**Williamson** (3–3)	–	5,576	23–19	6–9	Stats; Story
April 30	6:30 pm		Abilene Christian*		Crutcher Scott Field • Abilene, TX	**W** 11–6	**Green** (3–1)	Jordan (1–1)	–	1,040	24–19	6–9	Stats; Story

April

Date	Time (CT)	TV	Opponent	Rank	Stadium	Score	Win	Loss	Save	Attendance	Overall	Big 12	
May 3	5:30 pm		No. 28 West Virginia		Monongalia County Ballpark • Morgantown, WV	**W** 14–5	**Lodolo** (6–4)	Manoah (6–3)	–	2,043	25–19	7–9	Stats; Story
May 4	11:00 am	AT&TSN	No. 28 West Virginia		Monongalia County Ballpark • Morgantown, WV	**W** 6–1	**King** (4–2)	Wolf (2–3)	–	2,263	26–19	8–9	Stats; Story
May 5	12:00 pm		No. 28 West Virginia		Monongalia County Ballpark • Morgantown, WV	**L** 5–6	Reid (2–0)	**Perez** (3–2)	–	1,593	26–20	8–10	Stats; Story
May 10	6:30 pm	HFTV	Kansas		Lupton Stadium • Fort Worth, TX	**W** 4–3	**Green** (4–1)	Goldsberry (5–6)	–	5,147	27–20	9–10	Stats; Story
May 11	4:00 pm	FSSW+	Kansas		Lupton Stadium • Fort Worth, TX	**W** 7–4	**Coughlin** (2–0)	Ulane (0–1)	–	4,959	28–20	10–10	Stats
May 12	1:00 pm	FSSW+	Kansas		Lupton Stadium • Fort Worth, TX	**L** 1–3	Barry (5–0)	**Williamson** (3–4)	–	5,050	28–21	10–11	Stats; Story
May 14	6:30 pm	HFTV	Lamar*		Lupton Stadium • Fort Worth, TX	**L** 5–10	Erickson (2–4)	**Janczak** (0–3)	–	5,546	28–22	10–11	Stats; Story
May 16	6:30 pm	FSSW	No. 15 Texas Tech		Dan Law Field at Rip Griffin Park • Lubbock, TX	**W** 3–1	**Brown** (1–0)	McMillon (2–3)	**Mihlbauer** (1)	4,011	29–22	11–11	Stats; Story
May 17	6:30 pm	FSSW+	No. 15 Texas Tech		Dan Law Field at Rip Griffin Park • Lubbock, TX	**L** 2–7	Kilian (8–2)	**King** (4–3)	–	3,954	29–23	11–12	Stats; Story
May 18	6:30 pm	ESPNU	No. 15 Texas Tech		Dan Law Field at Rip Griffin Park • Lubbock, TX	**L** 4–8	Bonnin (5–1)	**Williamson** (3–5)	–	4,432	29–24	11–13	Stats; Story

Postseason
Big 12 Tournament

Date	Time (CT)	TV	Opponent	Seed	Stadium	Score	Win	Loss	Save	Attendance	Overall	Tourney	
May 22	7:30 pm	FCS	(3) Oklahoma State	(6)	Chickasaw Bricktown Ballpark • Oklahoma City, OK	**L** 2–5	Scott (3–1)	**Lodolo** (6–5)	–	4,242	29–25	0–1	Stats
May 23	12:30 pm	FSSW+	(7) Oklahoma	(6)	Chickasaw Bricktown Ballpark • Oklahoma City, OK	**W** 15–3	**King** (5–3)	Wiles (8–4)	–	3,280	30–25	1–1	Stats; Story
May 25	9:00 am	FSSW+	(2) Baylor	(6)	Chickasaw Bricktown Ballpark • Oklahoma City, OK	**W** 5–2	**Williamson** (4–5)	Ashkinos (2–4)	**Coughlin** (1)	6,398	31–25	2–1	Stats; Story
May 25	2:00 pm	FSSW	(3) Oklahoma State	(6)	Chickasaw Bricktown Ballpark • Oklahoma City, OK	**W** 13–6	**Green** (5–1)	Leeper (3–3)	–	7,383	32–25	3–1	Stats; Story
May 26	9:00 am	FSSW	(3) Oklahoma State	(6)	Chickasaw Bricktown Ballpark • Oklahoma City, OK	**L** 6–7	Battenfield (4–3)	**Coughlin** (2–1)	–	4,105	32–26	3–2	Stats

NCAA Regionals

Date	Time (CT)	TV	Opponent	Seed	Stadium	Score	Win	Loss	Save	Attendance	Overall	Tourney	
May 31	6:00 pm	ESPN3	(2) California	(3)	Baum-Walker Stadium • Fayetteville, AR	**W** 13–2	**King** (6–3)	Horn (6–2)	–	9,594	33–26	1–0	Stats; Story
June 1	6:00 pm	ESPN3	No. 5 Arkansas	(3)	Baum-Walker Stadium • Fayetteville, AR	**L** 1–3	Campbell (11–1)	**Lodolo** (6–6)	Cronin (12)	10,967	33–27	1–1	Stats; Story
June 2	2:00 pm	ESPN3	(4) CCSU	(3)	Baum-Walker Stadium • Fayetteville, AR	**W** 9–5	**Eissler** (4–4)	Appel (6–1)	–	9,546	34–27	2–1	Stats; Story
June 2	8:30 pm	ESPNU	No. 5 Arkansas	(3)	Baum-Walker Stadium • Fayetteville, AR	**L** 0–6	Wicklander (6–3)	**Janczak** (0–4)	–	10,242	34–28	2–2	Stats; Story

Legend: = Win = Loss Bold = TCU team member
"#" represents ranking. All rankings from Collegiate Baseball on the date of the contest.
"()" represents postseason seeding in the Big 12 Tournament or NCAA Regional, respectively.

== Rankings ==
Ranking movements Legend: ██ Increase in ranking ██ Decrease in ranking — = Not ranked RV = Received votes
	Week																		
Poll	Pre	1	2	3	4	5	6	7	8	9	10	11	12	13	14	15	16	17	Final
Coaches'	17	17*	17*	RV	RV	RV	20	25	23	21	RV	—	—	—	—	—	—*	—*	—
Baseball America	—	24	24	—	—	—	23	—	—	—	—	—	—	—	—	—	—*	—*	—
Collegiate Baseball^	19	16	19	—	—	—	28	25	22	20	—	—	—	—	—	—	—	—	—
NCBWA†	21	18	23	28	25	24	21	23	21	20	27	RV	RV	RV	RV	RV	RV*	RV*	RV
D1Baseball	19	18	18	23	21	22	19	25	19	19	—	—	—	—	—	—	—*	—*	—

^ Collegiate Baseball ranked 40 teams in their preseason poll, but only ranked 30 teams weekly during the season.
† NCBWA ranks 30 teams in their preseason poll, but only ranks 25 teams weekly during the season.
* A new poll was not released for this week, so for comparison purposes, the previous week's ranking is inserted in this week's slot.

== 2019 MLB draft ==
TCU had nine players selected in the draft, a program record.

Player	Position	Round	Overall	MLB team
Nick Lodolo	LHP	1	7	Cincinnati Reds
Brandon Williamson	LHP	2	59	Seattle Mariners
Johnny Rizer	OF	7	198	Baltimore Orioles
Jake Guenther	1B	7	218	Texas Rangers
Josh Watson	OF	15	464	Oakland Athletics
Zach Humphreys	C	26	793	Milwaukee Brewers
Alex Isola	C	29	869	Minnesota Twins
Jared Janczak	RHP	31	940	Cleveland Indians
Jake Eissler	RHP	38	1,150	Cleveland Indians

== See also ==
- 2019 Big 12 Conference baseball tournament
- 2019 NCAA Division I baseball season
