= 2019 Texas Longhorns baseball team =

American college baseball season

2019 Texas Longhorns baseball
- Conference: Big 12 Conference
- Record: 27–27 (7–16 Big 12)
- Head coach: David Pierce (3rd season)
- Assistant coaches: Sean Allen (3rd season); Philip Miller (3rd season); Phil Haig (3rd season)
- Home stadium: UFCU Disch–Falk Field

2019 Big 12 Conference baseball standings
	Conf.				Overall
Team	W		L	PCT	W		L	PCT
No. 4 Texas Tech ‍†‍‍^{y}	16	–	8	.667	46	–	20	.697
No. 23 Baylor ‍‍‍^{y}	14	–	8	.636	35	–	19	.648
No. 11 Oklahoma State ‍‍‡‍^{y}	14	–	9	.609	40	–	21	.656
No. 27 West Virginia ‍‍‍^{y}	13	–	11	.542	38	–	22	.633
Kansas ‍‍‍	12	–	12	.500	32	–	26	.552
TCU ‍‍‍^{y}	11	–	13	.458	34	–	28	.548
Oklahoma ‍‍‍	11	–	13	.458	33	–	23	.589
Kansas State ‍‍‍	8	–	16	.333	25	–	33	.431
Texas ‍‍‍	7	–	16	.304	27	–	27	.500
† – Conference champion ‡ – Tournament champion y – Invited to the NCAA tournament Rankings from Collegiate Baseball

The 2019 Texas Longhorns baseball team represented the Texas Longhorns baseball program for the University of Texas in the 2019 NCAA Division I baseball season. David Pierce coached the team in his 3rd season at Texas.

== Personnel ==
=== Roster ===
2019 Texas Longhorns roster
Pitchers: 8 – Kamron Fields – Sophomore; 13 – Bryce Elder – Sophomore; 17 – Nico O'Donnell – Sophomore; 19 – Daonny Diaz – (redshirt) Junior; 27 – Blair Henley – Junior; 32 – Ty Madden – Freshman; 33 – Matteo Bocchi – Senior; 34 – Cole Quintanilla – (redshirt) Freshman; 35 – Tristan Stevens – (redshirt) Sophomore; 37 – Matt Whelan – Sophomore; 38 – Jack Neely – Freshman; 39 – Kolby Kubichek – Freshman; 45 – Coy Cobb – Freshman; 46 – Brandon Ivey – Senior; 51 – Owen Meaney – Freshman; 56 – Justin Eckhardt – Freshman; 57 – Thomas Burbank – Freshman; 58 – Mason Bryant – Freshman	Catchers: 6 – DJ Petrinsky – Senior; 36 – Turner Gauntt – (redshirt) Freshman; 40 – Michael McCann – (redshirt) Senior; 48 – Caston Peter – Freshman; Infielders: 1 – David Hamilton – Junior; 5 – Ryan Reynolds – Junior; 7 – Masen Hibbeler – Senior; 10 – Bryce Reagan – Freshman; 28 – Lance Ford – Freshman; 41 – Bryson Smith – (redshirt) Sophomore; 43 – Peter Geib – Freshman; 52 – Zach Zubia – (redshirt) Sophomore; 55 – Sam Bertelson – Sophomore	Outfielders: 4 – Tate Shaw – (redshirt) Senior; 11 – Duke Ellis – Junior; 24 – Chase Roberts – Freshman; 30 – Eric Kennedy – Freshman; 44 – Austin Todd – Junior

=== Coaches ===
2019 Texas Longhorns coaching staff
- David Pierce – Head coach – 3rd
- Sean Allen – Assistant coach – 3rd
- Philip Miller – Assistant coach – 3rd
- Phil Haig – Volunteer assistant coach – 3rd

== Schedule ==
2019 Texas Longhorns baseball game log (27–27)
Legend: = Win = Loss = Canceled Bold = Texas team member
Regular season (27–27)

February (7–3)
Date	Time (CT)	TV	Opponent	Rank	Stadium	Score	Win	Loss	Save	Attendance	Overall record	Big 12 Record	Box Score	Recap
February 15	6:30 PM	CST	at Louisiana*	No. 23	M. L. Tigue Moore Field at Russo Park • Lafayette, LA	**W** 3–1 ^{10}	**Ivey (1–0)**	Perrin (0–1)	**Bryant (1)**	5,591	1–0	—	Box Score	Recap
February 16	2:00 PM	RCDN	at Louisiana*	No. 23	M. L. Tigue Moore Field at Russo Park • Lafayette, LA	**W** 6–5	**Quintanilla (1–0)**	Young (0–1)	**O'Donnell (1)**	5,517	2–0	—	Box Score	Recap
February 17	1:00 PM	RCDN	at Louisiana*	No. 23	M. L. Tigue Moore Field at Russo Park • Lafayette, LA	**L** 6–8	Horton (1–0)	**Cobb (0–1)**	Bradford (1)	5,119	2–1	—	Box Score	Recap
February 19	7:00 PM	CUSA.tv	at Rice*	No. 23	Reckling Park • Houston, TX	**W** 11–4	**Ridgeway (1–0)**	Greenwood (0–1)		3,255	3–1	—	Box Score	Recap
February 22	6:30 PM	LHN	Purdue*	No. 23	UFCU Disch–Falk Field • Austin, TX	**W** 7–2	**Elder (1–0)**	Parker (0–1)		5,919	4–1	—	Box Score	Recap
February 23	1:00 PM	LHN	Purdue*	No. 23	UFCU Disch–Falk Field • Austin, TX	**W** 13–6	**Henley (1–0)**	Beard (0–2)			5–1	—	Box Score	Recap
February 23	4:35 PM	LHN	Purdue*	No. 23	UFCU Disch–Falk Field • Austin, TX	**L** 0–4	Hofstra (1–0)	**Stevens (0–1)**		6,147	5–2	—	Box Score	Recap
February 24	12:30 PM	LHN	Purdue*	No. 23	UFCU Disch–Falk Field • Austin, TX	**W** 3–0	**Whelan (1–0)**	Smith (0–1)	**Quintanilla (1)**	5,155	6–2	—	Box Score	Recap
February 26	6:30 PM	LHN	Sam Houston State*	No. 22	UFCU Disch–Falk Field • Austin, TX	**W** 10–3	**Madden (1–0)**	Ballew (0–1)		4,575	7–2	—	Box Score	Recap
February 27	7:00 PM	LHN	UTSA*	No. 22	UFCU Disch–Falk Field • Austin, TX	**L** 7–10	Mason (1–0)	**Ridgeway (0–1)**		4,590	7–3	—	Box Score	Recap

March (13–8)
Date	Time (CT)	TV	Opponent	Rank	Stadium	Score	Win	Loss	Save	Attendance	Overall record	Big 12 Record	Box Score	Recap
March 1	6:30 PM	LHN	No. 2 LSU*	No. 22	UFCU Disch–Falk Field • Austin, TX	**W** 8–1	**Elder (2–0)**	Hess (1–1)	**Fields (1)**	7,680	8–3	—	Box Score	Recap
March 2	3:30 PM	LHN	No. 2 LSU*	No. 22	UFCU Disch–Falk Field • Austin, TX	**W** 8–4	**Henley (2–0)**	Marceaux (1–1)	**Quintanilla (2)**	7,601	9–3	—	Box Score	Recap
March 3	1:00 PM	LHN	No. 2 LSU*	No. 22	UFCU Disch–Falk Field • Austin, TX	**W** 7–6	**Madden (2–0)**	Peterson (2–1)		7,153	10–3	—	Box Score	Recap
March 5	4:30 PM	LHN	UTRGV*	No. 12	UFCU Disch–Falk Field • Austin, TX	**W** 4–3	**Stevens (1–1)**	Jackson (0–2)	**Quintanilla (3)**	4,258	11–3	—	Box Score	Recap
March 7	8:00 PM	Pac-12	at No. 6 Stanford*	No. 12	Klein Field at Sunken Diamond • Stanford, CA	**W** 4–0	**Fields (1–0)**	Beck (0–2)		907	12–3	—	Box Score	Recap
March 8	8:00 PM	Pac-12	at No. 6 Stanford*	No. 12	Klein Field at Sunken Diamond • Stanford, CA	**L** 1–8	Palisch (2–0)	**ELder (2–1)**		1,855	12–4	—	Box Score	Recap
March 9	4:00 PM	Pac-12	at No. 6 Stanford*	No. 12	Klein Field at Sunken Diamond • Stanford, CA	**L** 2–4	Little (2–1)	**Bryant (2–1)**		1,315	12–5	—	Box Score	Recap
March 10	3:00 PM	Pac-12	at No. 6 Stanford*	No. 12	Klein Field at Sunken Diamond • Stanford, CA	**L** 0–9	Miller (2–0)	**Cobb (0–2)**		1,162	12–6	—	Box Score	Recap
March 12	6:30 PM	LHN	Texas Southern*	No. 12	UFCU Disch–Falk Field • Austin, TX	**W** 17–3	**Whelan (2–0)**	Carillo (1–4)		4,724	13–6	—	Box Score	Recap
March 15	6:30 PM	LHN	No. 11 Texas Tech	No. 12	UFCU Disch–Falk Field • Austin, TX	**W** 4–3	**Madden (3–0)**	Haveman (1–1)	**Fields (2)**	7,460	14–6	1–0	Box Score	Recap
March 16	2:30 PM	LHN	No. 11 Texas Tech	No. 12	UFCU Disch–Falk Field • Austin, TX	**L** 0–3	Kilian (1–2)	**Henley (2–1)**	Beeter (3)	7,879	14–7	1–1	Box Score	Recap
March 17	1:00 PM	LHN	No. 11 Texas Tech	No. 12	UFCU Disch–Falk Field • Austin, TX	**W** 4–3	**Bryant (1–1)**	McMillon (0–1)	**Kubichek (1)**	7,390	15–7	2–1	Box Score	Recap
March 19	6:30 PM	LHN	No. 11 Arkansas*	No. 9	UFCU Disch–Falk Field • Austin, TX	**L** 4–11	Ramage (5–0)	**Neely (0–1)**		6,208	15–8	—	Box Score	Recap
March 20	6:30 PM	LHN	No. 11 Arkansas*	No. 9	UFCU Disch–Falk Field • Austin, TX	**W** 7–6	**Stevens (2–1)**	Trest (0–1)	**Quintanilla (4)**	6,260	16–8	—	Box Score	Recap
March 22	6:30 PM	FSSW+	at No. 22 TCU	No. 9	Lupton Stadium • Fort Worth, TX	**L** 2–3	Perez (1–0)	**Fields (1–1)**		5,590	16–9	2–2	Box Score	Recap
March 23	7:30 PM	ESPNU	at No. 22 TCU	No. 9	Lupton Stadium • Fort Worth, TX	**W** 13–1	**Henley (3–1)**	Eissler (3–2)		5,211	17–9	3–2	Box Score	Recap
March 24	1:00 PM	FSSW+	at No. 22 TCU	No. 9	Lupton Stadium • Fort Worth, TX	**L** 8–12	Perez (2–0)	**Quintanilla (1–1)**		4,498	17–10	3–3	Box Score	Recap
March 26	7:00 PM		at Incarnate Word*	No. 13	Nelson W. Wolff Municipal Stadium • San Antonio, TX	**L** 2–3	Shull (1–0)	**Madden (3–1)**	Taggart (1)	2,878	17–11	—	Box Score	Recap
March 29	7:00 PM	LHN	Xavier*	No. 13	UFCU Disch–Falk Field • Austin, TX	**W** 6–5 ^{12}	**Ivey (2–0)**	Flamm (2–2)		4,682	18–11	—	Box Score	Recap
March 30	5:30 PM	LHN	Xavier*	No. 13	UFCU Disch–Falk Field • Austin, TX	**W** 6–5	**Henley (4–1)**	Lanoue (2–2)	**Bocchi (1)**	5,171	19–11	—	Box Score	Recap
March 31	12:00 PM	LHN	Xavier*	No. 13	UFCU Disch–Falk Field • Austin, TX	**W** 6–5	**Quintanilla (2–1)**	Williams (0–1)		4,561	20–11	—	Box Score	Recap

April (5–11)
Date	Time (CT)	TV	Opponent	Rank	Stadium	Score	Win	Loss	Save	Attendance	Overall record	Big 12 Record	Box Score	Recap
April 2	6:30 PM	FS1	No. 9 Texas A&M*	No. 12	UFCU Disch–Falk Field • Austin, TX	**L** 6–9	Saenz (2–0)	**Meaney (0–1)**	Kalich (7)	7,952 (Note: Set new regular season attendance record at UFCU Disch-Falk Field)	20–12	—	Box Score	Recap
April 5	8:00 PM	ESPNU	at Baylor	No. 12	Baylor Ballpark • Waco, TX	**L** 5–6	Boyd (3–0)	**Whelan (2–1)**		3,302	20–13	3–4	Box Score	Recap
April 6	5:45 PM	FSSW+	at Baylor	No. 12	Baylor Ballpark • Waco, TX	**W** 8–6	**Henley (5–1)**	Ashkinos (0–2)	**Fields (3)**	2,456	21–13	4–4	Box Score	Recap
April 7	3:35 PM	FSGO	at Baylor	No. 12	Baylor Ballpark • Waco, TX	Canceled due to rain, Texas up 6–0 in the 2nd inning								Recap
April 9	6:30 PM	LHN	Rice*	No. 14	UFCU Disch–Falk Field • Austin, TX	**W** 3–1	**Bocchi (1–0)**	Jackson (0–2)	**Diaz (1)**	5,496	22–13	—	Box Score	Recap
April 12	6:30 PM	LHN	Kansas State	No. 14	UFCU Disch–Falk Field • Austin, TX	**L** 4–6	Hassall (1–1)	**Elder (2–2)**	Brennan (1)	5,374	22–14	4–5	Box Score	Recap
April 13	1:00 PM	LHN	Kansas State	No. 14	UFCU Disch–Falk Field • Austin, TX	**W** 10–2	**Henley (6–1)**	Ford (0–3)		6,375	23–14	5–5	Box Score	Recap
April 14	1:00 PM	LHN	Kansas State	No. 14	UFCU Disch–Falk Field • Austin, TX	**L** 0–2	Wicks (5–1)	**Cobb (0–3)**		5,732	23–15	5–6	Box Score	Recap
April 16	6:30 PM	LHN	Lamar*		UFCU Disch–Falk Field • Austin, TX	**W** 7–2	**Bocchi (2–0)**	Ozorio-Brace (1–1)		4,706	24–15	—	Box Score	Recap
April 18	7:00 PM	FS1	at Oklahoma State		Allie P. Reynolds Stadium • Stillwater, OK	**L** 0–15	Elliott (0–0)	**Elder (2–3)**		1,876	24–16	5–7	Box Score	Recap
April 19	6:35 PM	FSSW+	at Oklahoma State		Allie P. Reynolds Stadium • Stillwater, OK	**L** 2–10	Scott (2–0)	**Henley (6–2)**		2,671	24–17	5–8	Box Score	Recap
April 20	3:00 PM	ESPNU	at Oklahoma State		Allie P. Reynolds Stadium • Stillwater, OK	**L** 10–11	Gragg (2–3)	**Diaz (0–1)**		4,637	24–18	5–9	Box Score	Recap
April 23	6:00 PM		at Texas State*		Bobcat Ballpark • San Marcos, TX	**L** 6–7	Leigh (3–1)	**Stevens (2–2)**		3,119	24–19	—	Box Score	Recap
April 26	6:30 PM	LHN	No. 17 West Virginia		UFCU Disch–Falk Field • Austin, TX	**L** 2–3	Kessler (4–2)	**Bocchi (2–1)**		5,213	24–20	5–10	Box Score	Recap
April 27	2:30 PM	LHN	No. 17 West Virginia		UFCU Disch–Falk Field • Austin, TX	**L** 8–9	Reid (1–0)	**Fields (1–2)**	Kessler (7)	6,334	24–21	5–11	Box Score	Recap
April 28	12:00 PM	LHN	No. 17 West Virginia		UFCU Disch–Falk Field • Austin, TX	**W** 10–2	**Madden (4–1)**	Strowd (4–5)	**Bocchi (2)**	5,379	25–21	6–11	Box Score	Recap
April 30	6:35 PM		at Texas A&M-Corpus Christi*		Whataburger Field • Corpus Christi, TX	**L** 2–8	Rumfield (4–1)	**Kubichek (0–1)**		4,012	25–22	—	Box Score	Recap

May (2–5)
Date	Time (CT)	TV	Opponent	Rank	Stadium	Score	Win	Loss	Save	Attendance	Overall record	Big 12 Record	Box Score	Recap
May 3	6:00 PM	ESPN+	at Kansas		Hoglund Ballpark • Lawrence, KS	**L** 2–4	Goldsberry (5–5)	**Bocchi (2–2)**		1,072	25–23	6–12	Box Score	Recap
May 4	2:00 PM	ESPN+	at Kansas		Hoglund Ballpark • Lawrence, KS	**L** 0–1	Cyr (3–6)	**Henley (6–3)**		1,465	25–24	6–13	Box Score	Recap
May 5	1:00 PM	ESPN+	at Kansas		Hoglund Ballpark • Lawrence, KS	**L** 6–10	Barry (4–0)	**Whelan (2–2)**		1,213	25–25	6–14	Box Score	Recap
May 7	6:30 PM	LHN	Texas State*		UFCU Disch–Falk Field • Austin, TX	Canceled due to rain								Recap
May 14	6:30 PM	LHN	Incarnate Word*		UFCU Disch–Falk Field • Austin, TX	**W** 9–0	**Cobb (1–3)**	Foral (0–3)		4,672	26–25	—	Box Score	Recap
May 16	6:30 PM	LHN	Oklahoma		UFCU Disch–Falk Field • Austin, TX	**L** 2–4	Wiles (8–3)	**Elder (2–4)**	Ruffcorn (11)	4,892	26–26	6–15	Box Score	Recap
May 17	1:00 PM	LHN	Oklahoma		UFCU Disch–Falk Field • Austin, TX	**L** 0–13 ^{7}	Prater (7–4)	**Henley (6–4)**			26–27	6–16	Box Score	Recap

* indicates a non-conference game. All rankings from D1Baseball on the date of the contest.

== Rankings ==
Ranking movements Legend: ██ Increase in ranking ██ Decrease in ranking — = Not ranked
	Week																		
Poll	Pre	1	2	3	4	5	6	7	8	9	10	11	12	13	14	15	16	17	Final
Coaches'	16	16*	16*	11	18	15	16	17	17	25	—								
Baseball America	19	19	19	9	10	4	7	8	9	20	—								
Collegiate Baseball^	14	14	18	7	20	17	—	26	26	—									
NCBWA†	18	20	20	12	15	11	17	13	18	25	—								
D1Baseball	23	23	22	12	12	9	13	12	14	—									

^ Collegiate Baseball ranked 40 teams in their preseason poll, but only ranked 30 teams weekly during the season.
† NCBWA ranks 30 teams in their preseason poll, but only ranks 25 teams weekly during the season.
* A new poll was not released for this week, so for comparison purposes, the previous week's ranking is inserted in this week's slot.
