= 2019 New Orleans Privateers baseball team =

American college baseball season

2019 New Orleans Privateers baseball
- Conference: Southland Conference
- Record: 29–27 (13–17 SLC)
- Head coach: Blake Dean (4th season)
- Hitting coach: Brett Stewart (4th season)
- Pitching coach: Rudy Darrow (3rd season)
- Home stadium: Maestri Field at Privateer Park

2019 Southland Conference baseball standings
	Conf.				Overall
Team	W		L	PCT	W		L	PCT
Sam Houston State ‍†‍‍	20	–	10	.667	31	–	25	.554
Southeastern Louisiana ‍‍‍	19	–	11	.633	33	–	27	.550
Central Arkansas ‍‍‍	19	–	11	.633	32	–	27	.542
Incarnate Word ‍‍‍	18	–	12	.600	37	–	22	.627
McNeese State ‍‍‡‍^{y}	16	–	14	.533	35	–	26	.574
Stephen F. Austin ‍‍‍	16	–	14	.533	25	–	33	.431
Northwestern State ‍‍‍	15	–	15	.500	30	–	25	.545
Texas A&M–Corpus Christi ‍‍‍	14	–	16	.467	31	–	26	.544
New Orleans ‍‍‍	13	–	17	.433	29	–	27	.518
Abilene Christian ‍‍‍	13	–	17	.433	26	–	26	.500
Nicholls ‍‍‍	13	–	17	.433	27	–	28	.491
Houston Baptist ‍‍‍	10	–	20	.333	18	–	35	.340
Lamar ‍‍‍	9	–	21	.300	18	–	36	.333
† – Conference champion ‡ – Tournament champion y – Invited to the NCAA tournament As of June 5, 2019; Rankings from D1Baseball

The 2019 New Orleans Privateers baseball team represent the University of New Orleans (UNO) during the 2019 NCAA Division I baseball season. The Privateers play their home games at Maestri Field at Privateer Park as a member of the Southland Conference. They are led by head coach Blake Dean, in his 4th season at UNO.

== Preseason ==
=== SLC media poll ===
The SLC media poll was released on February 7, 2019 with the Privateers predicted to finish 7th, the position they finished the past three seasons.

Media poll
Predicted finish	Team	Votes (1st place)
1	Sam Houston State	284 (22)
2	Southeastern Louisiana	258 (3)
3	Northwestern State	250 (1)
4	Central Arkansas	200
5	McNeese State	187
6	Houston Baptist	169
7	New Orleans	130
8	Lamar	128
9	Nicholls	120
10	Incarnate Word	104
11	Texas A&M–Corpus Christi	97
12	Stephen F. Austin	63
13	Abilene Christian	38

=== Preseason All-SLC teams ===
1st Team

- Beau Bratton – Catcher

2nd Team

- Pearce Howard – Outfielder

== Personnel ==
=== Roster ===
2019 UNO Privateers roster
Pitchers: 1 Reeves Martin - Junior; 11 Zach Thompson - Senior; 15 Brayson Smith - Senior; 19 Luke Bradley - Junior; 20 Mathew Oset - Senior; 23 Chris Turpin - Junior; 25 John Barr - Senior; 26 Jonathan Allen - Freshman; 27 Jack Wolgast - Freshman; 31 Steven Swift - Freshman; 32 Bailey Holstein - Junior; 33 Brandon Mitchell - Freshman; 37 Eric Orze - Senior; 50 Keith Meier - Junior; 52 Christopher DeMayo - Junior	Catchers: 9 Robert Fabelo - Junior; 24 Beau Bratton - Junior; 34 Jorge Tejeda - Freshman; Infielders: 2 Caden Rosholt - Junior; 3 Darren Willis - Junior; 6 Antonio Gauthier Jr. - Freshman; 7 Scott Crabtree - Senior; 10 Brayden Morrow - Freshman; 13 Carlos Kelly - Senior; 17 Quinn Waterbury - Junior; 18 Cortlynn Ramirez - Freshman; 29 Salo Iza - Junior	Outfielders: 4 Luther Woullard - Junior; 5 Wade Raburn - Junior; 8 Evan Francioni - Freshman; 16 Tresten Kennard - Freshman; 35 Pearce Howard - Sophomore; 43 Gaige Howard - Junior; Utility: 12 Collin Morrill - Senior; 22 Cristian Poche - Freshman

=== Coaching staff ===
Name	Position	Seasons at UNO	Alma mater
Blake Dean	Head coach	4	Louisiana State University (2013)
Brett Stewart	Assistant Coach	4	Appalachian State University (2009)
Rudy Darrow	Assistant Coach	3	Nicholls State University (2012)
Dylan Belanger	Assistant Coach/Camp Coordinator	4	University of Louisiana-Monroe

== Schedule ==
Legend
	UNO win
	UNO loss
**Bold**	UNO team member

2019 New Orleans Privateers Game Log
Regular season (29–27)

February (6–1)
Date	Opponent	Rank	Site/stadium	Score	Win	Loss	Save	Attendance	Overall record	SLC record
Feb. 15	Michigan State		Maestri Field • New Orleans, LA	4–8	Erla	**Swift** (0–1)	Sleeman	843	0–1	–
Feb. 16	Michigan State		Maestri Field • New Orleans, LA	4–1	**Turpin** (1–0)	Mokma	**Martin** (1)	202	1–1	–
Feb. 17	Michigan State		Maestri Field • New Orleans, LA	6–4	**Barr** (1–0)	Olson	**Martin** (2)	363	2–1	–
Feb. 22	Chicago State		Maestri Field • New Orleans, LA	16–8	**Oset** (1–0)	Cumming	None	303	3–1	–
Feb. 23	Rutgers		Maestri Field • New Orleans, LA	7–2	**Turpin** (2–0)	Murray	**Barr** (1)	227	4–1	–
Feb. 24	Butler		Maestri Field • New Orleans, LA	2–1	**Martin** (1–0)	Myers	None	227	5–1	–
Feb. 26	Southern Miss		Pete Taylor Park • Hattiesburg, MS	2–1	**Mitchell** (1–0)	Wright	**Martin** (3)	3,054	6–1	–

March (8–12)
Date	Opponent	Rank	Site/stadium	Score	Win	Loss	Save	Attendance	Overall record	SLC record
Mar. 1	Yale		Maestri Field • New Orleans, LA	1–4	Politz	**Smith** (0–1)	None	193	6–2	–
Mar. 2	Yale		Maestri Field • New Orleans, LA	8–7^{10}	**Martin** (2–0)	Sapsford	None	181	7–2	–
Mar. 2	Yale		Maestri Field • New Orleans, LA	6–8	Stiegler	**Barr** (1–1)	Dey	181	7–3	–
Mar. 6	Jackson State		Braddy Field • Jackson, MS	21–2^{7}	**Holstein** (1–0)	Swartz	None	75	8–3	–
Mar. 8	Nicholls		Ben Meyer Diamond • Thibodaux, LA	3–2	**Oset** (2–0)	Balado	**Martin** (4)	556	9–3	1–0
Mar. 9	Nicholls		Ben Meyer Diamond • Thibodaux, LA	2–3	Holland	**Barr** (1–2)	None	380	9–4	1–1
Mar. 10	Nicholls		Ben Meyer Diamond • Thibodaux, LA	1–9	Mejia	**DeMayo** (1–1)	None	502	9–5	1–2
Mar. 12	Louisiana		M. L. Moore Field • Lafayette, LA	10–3	**Smith** (1–1)	Schultz	None	4,428	10–5	–
Mar. 15	Northwestern State		Brown-Stroud Field • Natchitoches, LA	3–4	Heisler	**Oset** (2–1)	None	476	10–6	1–3
Mar. 16	Northwestern State		Brown-Stroud Field • Natchitoches, LA	5–2	**Turpin** (3–0)	Maddox	**Martin** (5)	501	11–6	2–3
Mar. 17	Northwestern State		Brown-Stroud Field • Natchitoches, LA	1–8	Jones	**DeMayo** (0–2)	None	492	11–7	2–4
Mar. 19	South Alabama		Maestri Field • New Orleans, LA	7–5	**Oset** (3–1)	McBride	**Martin** (6)	145	12–7	–
Mar. 20	South Alabama		Eddie Stanky Field • Mobile, AL	7–22^{7}	Perez	**Smith** (1–2)	None	1,316	12–8	–
Mar. 22	Sam Houston State		Maestri Field • New Orleans, LA	2–6	Wesneski	**Mitchell** (1–1)	None	122	12–9	2–5
Mar. 23	Sam Houston State		Maestri Field • New Orleans, LA	6–4^{11}	**Martin** (3–0)	Mikolajchak	None	245	13–9	3–5
Mar. 24	Sam Houston State		Maestri Field • New Orleans, LA	2–8	Ballew	**DeMayo** (0–3)	None	252	13–10	3–6
Mar. 26	Southern		Maestri Field • New Orleans, LA	9–6	**Barr** (2–2)	Bohannon III	**Martin** (7)	157	14–10	–
Mar. 29	Incarnate Word		Sullivan Field • San Antonio, TX	7–15	Taggart	**Barr** (2–3)	Martinez	269	14–11	3–7
Mar. 30	Incarnate Word		Sullivan Field • San Antonio, TX	2–3	Miller	**Turpin** (3–1)	None	280	14–12	3–8
Mar. 31	Incarnate Word		Sullivan Field • San Antonio, TX	2–5	Celestino	**Holstein** (1–1)	Martinez	226	14–13	3–9

April (8–10)
Date	Opponent	Rank	Site/stadium	Score	Win	Loss	Save	Attendance	Overall record	SLC record
Apr. 2	Tulane		Maestri Field • New Orleans, LA	8–7^{10}	**Barr** (3–3)	Pellerin	None	481	15–13	–
Apr. 3	Jackson State		Maestri Field • New Orleans, LA	4–12	Lopez	**Ramirez** (0–1)	None	116	15–14	–
Apr. 5	Southeastern LA		Maestri Field • New Orleans, LA	1–7	Gaconi	**Mitchell** (1–2)	None	453	15–15	3–10
Apr. 6	Southeastern LA		Maestri Field • New Orleans, LA	6–7	Knopp	**Turpin** (3–2)	Biddy	315	15–16	3–11
Apr. 6	Southeastern LA		Maestri Field • New Orleans, LA	7–4	**Swift** (1–1)	Warren	**Martin** (8)	315	16–16	4–11
Apr. 10	Southern		Lee–Hines Field • Baton Rouge, LA	4–5^{10}	Bailey	**Barr** (3–4)	None	421	16–17	–
Apr. 12	McNeese State		Joe Miller Ballpark • Lake Charles, LA	1–2	Deaton	**Mitchell** (1–3)	Anderson	350	16–18	4–12
Apr. 12	McNeese State		Joe Miller Ballpark • Lake Charles, LA	2–0	**Turpin** (4–2)	Ellison	**Martin** (9)	957	17–18	5–12
Apr. 13	McNeese State		Joe Miller Ballpark • Lake Charles, LA	4–16	Dion	**Swift** (1–2)	None	857	17–19	5–13
Apr. 16	Tulane		Maestri Field • New Orleans, LA	15–10	**Oset** (4–1)	Green	**Martin** (10)	362	18–19	–
Apr. 18	Missouri State		Hammons Field • Springfield, MO	3–8	Lochner	**Holstein** (1–2)	None	227	18–20	–
Apr. 19	Missouri State		Hammons Field • Springfield, MO	1–6	Wiley	**Turpin** (4–3)	None	322	18–21	–
Apr. 20	Missouri State		Hammons Field • Springfield, MO	20–12	**Oset** (5–1)	Schmidt	**Martin** (11)	516	19–21	–
Apr. 24	Southern Miss		Maestri Field • New Orleans, LA	2–15	Lewis	**Ramirez** (0–2)	None	294	19–22	–
Apr. 26	Lamar		Maestri Field • New Orleans, LA	6–5	**Mitchell** (2–3)	Erickson	**Martin** (12)	198	20–22	6–13
Apr. 27	Lamar		Maestri Field • New Orleans, LA	7–6^{10}	**Oset** (6–1)	Dallas	None	303	21–22	7–13
Apr. 28	Lamar		Maestri Field • New Orleans, LA	2–4	Hranicky	**Swift** (1–3)	Johnson	263	21–23	7–14
Apr. 30	Tulane		Turchin Stadium • New Orleans, LA	14–9	**Barr** (4–4)	Pellerin	None	1,961	22–23	–

May (7–4)
Date	Opponent	Rank	Site/stadium	Score	Win	Loss	Save	Attendance	Overall record	SLC record
May 3	Abilene Christian		Maestri Field • New Orleans, LA	14–2	**Mitchell** (3–3)	Chirpich	None	139	23–23	8–14
May 3	Abilene Christian		Maestri Field • New Orleans, LA	3–7	Hanson	**Turpin** (4–4)	None	139	23–24	8–15
May 5	Abilene Christian		Maestri Field • New Orleans, LA	5–4^{13}	**Oset** (7–1)	Jordan	None	316	24–24	9–15
May 7	Southern		Maestri Field • New Orleans, LA	5–4	**Ramirez** (1–2)	Bohannon III	**Martin** (13)	212	25–24	–
May 10	Houston Baptist		Maestri Field • New Orleans, LA	8–7^{10}	**Martin** (4–0)	Newton	None	347	26–24	10–15
May 11	Houston Baptist		Maestri Field • New Orleans, LA	14–6	**Turpin** (5–4)	Endsley	**Barr** (2)	347	27–24	11–15
May 12	Houston Baptist		Maestri Field • New Orleans, LA	11–5	**Holstein** (2–2)	Carter	**Martin** (14)	303	28–24	12–15
May 14	No. 20 LSU		Alex Box Stadium • Baton Rouge, LA	5–7	Beck	**Ramirez** (1–3)	Hess	10,147	28–25	–
May 16	Stephen F. Austin		Jaycees Field • Nacogdoches, TX	1–2	Palmer	**Mitchell** (3–4)	None	192	28–26	12–16
May 17	Stephen F. Austin		Jaycees Field • Nacogdoches, TX	4–5	Kubo	**Turpin** (5–5)	Gamez	206	28–27	12–17
May 18	Stephen F. Austin		Jaycees Field • Nacogdoches, TX	10–1	**Smith** (2–2)	Stobart	None	283	29–27	13–17

All rankings from Collegiate Baseball.
