= 2019 West Virginia Mountaineers baseball team =

American college baseball season

2019 West Virginia Mountaineers baseball

NCAA Morgantown Regional, 1-2
- Conference: Big 12 Conference

Ranking
- Coaches: No. 19
- CB: No. 27
- Record: 38-22 (13-11 Big 12)
- Head coach: Randy Mazey (7th season)
- Assistant coaches: Steve Sabins (4th season); Mark Ginther (1st season)
- Home stadium: Monongalia County Ballpark

2019 Big 12 Conference baseball standings
	Conf.				Overall
Team	W		L	PCT	W		L	PCT
No. 4 Texas Tech ‍†‍‍^{y}	16	–	8	.667	46	–	20	.697
No. 23 Baylor ‍‍‍^{y}	14	–	8	.636	35	–	19	.648
No. 11 Oklahoma State ‍‍‡‍^{y}	14	–	9	.609	40	–	21	.656
No. 27 West Virginia ‍‍‍^{y}	13	–	11	.542	38	–	22	.633
Kansas ‍‍‍	12	–	12	.500	32	–	26	.552
TCU ‍‍‍^{y}	11	–	13	.458	34	–	28	.548
Oklahoma ‍‍‍	11	–	13	.458	33	–	23	.589
Kansas State ‍‍‍	8	–	16	.333	25	–	33	.431
Texas ‍‍‍	7	–	16	.304	27	–	27	.500
† – Conference champion ‡ – Tournament champion y – Invited to the NCAA tournament Rankings from Collegiate Baseball

The 2019 West Virginia Mountaineers baseball team represented West Virginia University during the 2019 NCAA Division I baseball season. The Mountaineers played their home games at Monongalia County Ballpark as a member of the Big 12 Conference. They were led by head coach Randy Mazey, in his 7th season at West Virginia. They hosted the Morgantown Regional in the NCAA tournament, where they lost to Texas A&M.

== Previous season ==
The 2018 West Virginia Mountaineers baseball team finished the regular season with an overall record of 29–27 and a 9–15 mark in Big 12 play, placing seventh in the conference standings. The Mountaineers qualified for the 2018 Big 12 Conference Baseball Tournament, where they posted a 2–2 record. They picked up wins over Oklahoma State and Texas Tech, but were eliminated after a second loss to Texas Tech in the semifinals.

== Preseason ==
=== Big 12 Coaches poll ===
The coaches poll was released on January 32, 2019. West Virginia was picked to finish sixth in the Big 12.

Big 12 coaches poll
Predicted finish	Team	Votes (1st place)
1	Texas Tech	61 (6)
2	Baylor	58 (2)
3	TCU	48 (1)
4	Texas	40
5	Oklahoma State	39
6	West Virginia	31
7	Oklahoma	23
8	Kansas	16
9	Kansas State	8

== Personnel ==
=== Coaching staff ===
2025 West Virginia Mountaineers coaching staff
- Randy Mazey - Head coach - 7th year
- Mark Ginther - Associate Coach- 1st year
- Steve Sabins - Assistant Coach/Recruiting Coordinator - 4th year

=== Roster ===
2019 West Virginia Mountaineers roster

#	Name	Position	Height	Weight	Class	Hometown
4	Cody Wood	RHP	6'3"	195	Jr	Denver, CO
5	Kade Strowd	RHP	6'2"	175	Jr	Fort Worth, TX
6	Gabe Kurtzhals	RHP	5'9"	160	Fr	Fort Worth, TX
9	Tristen Hudson	RHP	6'3"	178	So	Seneca, SC
15	Jeremy Lapp-Barger	RHP	6'0"	180	Fr	Sykesville, MD
16	Dillon Meadows	RHP	6'2"	185	Jr	Paradise, TX
18	Zach Reid	LHP	5'11"	165	Sr	Montgomery, AL
19	Brock Helverson	RHP	6'3"	185	Fr	Schwenksville, PA
20	Drew Britt	RHP	6'5"	220	Fr	Downingtown, PA
23	Jackson Wolf	LHP	6'7"	205	So	Gahanna, OH
26	Braden Zarbnisky	RHP/OF	6'3"	185	Sr	Marietta, GA
30	Beau Lowery	LHP	6'0"	225	Fr	Martinsburg, WV
33	Madison Jeffrey	RHP	6'0"	190	Fr	Barboursville, WV
35	Nick Snyder	LHP	6'7"	220	Jr	Marlton, NJ
37	Zach Ottinger	RHP	6'1"	180	Fr	Marietta, GA
39	Ryan Bergert	RHP	6'2"	195	Fr	Canton, OH
42	Sam Kessler	RHP	6'1"	192	Jr	Mount Sinai, NY
43	Daniel Ouderkirk	LHP	6'9"	225	Fr	Penn Laird, VA
47	Alek Manoah	RHP	6'6"	260	Jr	Miami, FL
2	Tevin Tucker	INF	6'0"	175	Fr	Prince George, VA
11	J.J. Sousa	INF	6'1"	155	Fr	Palm Coast, FL
13	Kevin Brophy	INF	6'3"	215	Jr	Randolph, NJ
17	Phillip Dull	INF/P	6'0"	192	Fr	Alum Bank, PA
21	Austin Davis	INF	5'10"	175	Fr	Orlando, FL
25	Marques Inman	1B	6'1"	200	Jr	Elyria, OH
44	Alec Burns	1B/OF	6'4"	220	Fr	Amherst, NH
45	Andrew Zitel	INF	6'2"	207	Sr	Hillsborough, NJ
1	Tyler Doanes	2B	5'10"	175	So	Fayetteville, GA
24	Chase Illig	C	6'0"	210	Jr	Bluefield, WV
27	Conner Hamilton	C	6'1"	220	So	Forestport, NY
32	Ivan Gonzalez	C	5'9"	184	Sr	Round Rock, TX
34	Paul McIntosh	C	6'1"	220	So	Miami Gardens, FL
7	Brandon White	CF	5'11"	160	Jr	Winter Springs, FL
10	Trey Lowe III	OF	6'2"	218	So	Collierville, TN
12	T.J. Lake	OF	6'1"	185	Jr	Toledo, OH
26	Braden Zarbnisky	RHP/OF	6'3"	185	Sr	Marietta, GA
31	Darius Hill	RF	6'1"	190	Sr	Dallas, TX
44	Alec Burns	1B/OF	6'4"	220	Fr	Amherst, NH

== Awards and honors ==
=== Big 12 awards and honors ===
All-Big 12 Team
Player	No.	Position	Class	Designation
Alek Manoah	47	RHP	Junior	First Team
Ivan Gonzalez	32	C	Senior	Second Team
Darius Hill	31	OF	Senior	Second Team
Marques Inman	25	DH	Junior	Second Team
Sam Kessler	2	RHP	Junior	Second Team
Paul McIntosh	34	1B	Sophomore	Second Team
Tyler Doanes	1	2B	Sophomore	Honorable Mention
Nick Snyder	35	LHP	Junior	Honorable Mention
Brandon White	7	OF	Junior	Honorable Mention
