= 2019 Nicholls Colonels baseball team =

Baseball team

2019 Nicholls Colonels baseball
- Conference: Southland Conference
- Record: 27-28 (13-17 SLC)
- Head coach: Seth Thibodeaux (9th season)
- Assistant coaches: Walt Jones; Zach Butler; Ford Pemberton
- Home stadium: Ben Meyer Diamond at Ray E. Didier Field

2019 Southland Conference baseball standings
	Conf.				Overall
Team	W		L	PCT	W		L	PCT
Sam Houston State ‍†‍‍	20	–	10	.667	31	–	25	.554
Southeastern Louisiana ‍‍‍	19	–	11	.633	33	–	27	.550
Central Arkansas ‍‍‍	19	–	11	.633	32	–	27	.542
Incarnate Word ‍‍‍	18	–	12	.600	37	–	22	.627
McNeese State ‍‍‡‍^{y}	16	–	14	.533	35	–	26	.574
Stephen F. Austin ‍‍‍	16	–	14	.533	25	–	33	.431
Northwestern State ‍‍‍	15	–	15	.500	30	–	25	.545
Texas A&M–Corpus Christi ‍‍‍	14	–	16	.467	31	–	26	.544
New Orleans ‍‍‍	13	–	17	.433	29	–	27	.518
Abilene Christian ‍‍‍	13	–	17	.433	26	–	26	.500
Nicholls ‍‍‍	13	–	17	.433	27	–	28	.491
Houston Baptist ‍‍‍	10	–	20	.333	18	–	35	.340
Lamar ‍‍‍	9	–	21	.300	18	–	36	.333
† – Conference champion ‡ – Tournament champion y – Invited to the NCAA tournament As of June 5, 2019; Rankings from D1Baseball

The 2019 Nicholls Colonels baseball team represented Nicholls State University in the 2019 NCAA Division I baseball season. The Colonels played their home games at Ben Meyer Diamond at Ray E. Didier Field.

== Roster ==
2019 Nicholls Colonels roster
Pitchers: 15 Bryan Taylor - Junior; 16 Zach Autin - Junior; 19 Tyler Theriot - Freshman; 20 Nick Heckman - Freshman; 21 Trever Kilcrease - Junior; 24 Nick Hill - Freshman; 26 Adam Tarver - Redshirt Junior; 30 Cyle Clayton - Redshirt Freshman; 32 Colin Kramer - Junior; 34 Jacob Bedevian - Senior; 35 Shane Mejia Jr. - Freshman; 37 Austin Bollinger - Redshirt Junior; 38 Parker White - Senior; 39 Brandon Andrews - Sophomore; 40 Matthew Harrison - Junior; 41 Brandon Babin - Freshman; 44 Peter Holland - Junior; 47 Beau Balado - Junior	Catchers: 14 Dillon Belle - Junior; 25 Kade Sonnier - Sophomore; 36 Christopher Sandberg - Junior; 43 Hayden Charlet - Freshman; Infielders: 1 Will Ethridge - Sophomore; 6 Waylon LeBlanc - Sophomore; 7 Nathan Tribble - Sophomore; 10 CJ Hughes - Junior; 11 Ethan Valdez - Senior; 12 Brady Bell - Redshirt Senior; 13 Ivan Prejean - Sophomore; 29 Mason Barker - Freshman	Outfielders: 2 Champ Davidson - Senior; 4 Mason Turner - Freshman; 5 Austin France - Redshirt Sophomore; 8 Xane Washington - Sophomore; 18 Tre Turner - Sophomore; 22 Alec Paz - Junior; 23 Lloyd Nash - Freshman; 27 Dane Simon - Sophomore

=== Coaching staff ===
2019 Nicholls Colonels coaching staff
- Seth Thibodeaux – Head Coach – 9th year
- Walt Jones – Associate Coach & Recruiting Coordinator/Hitting Coordinator/Outfielders Coach – 4th year
- Zach Butler – Assistant Head Coach & Pitching Coach/Academic Liaison – 6th year
- Ford Pemberton – Assistant Head Coach & Director of Camps – 3rd year
- Lee Clark – Student Assistant Coach

== Schedule ==
2019 Nicholls Colonels baseball game log
Regular season
February

#	Date	Opponent	Venue	Score	Overall record	SLC record
1	February 15	Southern Illinois	Ben Meyer Diamond at Ray E. Didier Field • Thibodaux, LA	L 5–6	0–1	
2	February 16	Southern Illinois	Ben Meyer Diamond at Ray E. Didier Field • Thibodaux, LA	W 3–2	1–1	
3	February 17	Southern Illinois	Ben Meyer Diamond at Ray E. Didier Field • Thibodaux, LA	W 7-3	2–1	
4	February 19	Alcorn State	Ben Meyer Diamond at Ray E. Didier Field • Thibodaux, LA	W 25–5	3–1	
5	February 22	Grambling State	Ben Meyer Diamond at Ray E. Didier Field • Thibodaux, LA	W 6–1	4–1	
6	February 24	Grambling State	Ben Meyer Diamond at Ray E. Didier Field • Thibodaux, LA	W 16–5	5–1	
7	February 24	Grambling State	Ben Meyer Diamond at Ray E. Didier Field • Thibodaux, LA	W 7-2	6-1	
8	February 26	Tulane	Ben Meyer Diamond at Ray E. Didier Field • Thibodaux, LA	L 4–7	6–2	

March

#	Date	Opponent	Venue	Score	Overall record	SLC record
9	March 1	vs. McNeese State (Mardi Gras Classic)	Joe Miller Ballpark • Lake Charles, LA	L 6–7	6–3	
10	March 2	vs. Holy Cross (Mardi Gras Classic)	Joe Miller Ballpark • Lake Charles, LA	W 11–2	7–3	
11	March 3	vs. Holy Cross (Mardi Gras Classic)	Joe Miller Ballpark • Lake Charles, LA	L 6–8	7–4	
12	March 3	vs. McNeese State (Mardi Gras Classic)	Joe Miller Ballpark • Lake Charles, LA	L 4–5 (10 inn)	7–5	
13	March 5	Louisiana	Ben Meyer Diamond at Ray E. Didier Field • Thibodaux, LA	L 1–3	7–6	
14	March 6	at South Alabama	Eddie Stanky Field • Mobile, AL	L 3–6	7–7	
15	March 8	New Orleans	Ben Meyer Diamond at Ray E. Didier Field • Thibodaux, LA	L 2–3	7–8	0-1
16	March 9	New Orleans	Ben Meyer Diamond at Ray E. Didier Field • Thibodaux, LA	W 3-2	8–8	1-1
17	March 10	New Orleans	Ben Meyer Diamond at Ray E. Didier Field • Thibodaux, LA	W 9–1	9–8	2-1
18	March 12	Alcorn State	Ben Meyer Diamond at Ray E. Didier Field • Thibodaux, LA	W 10–1	10–8	
19	March 13	at Alcorn State	Foster Baseball Field at McGowan Stadium • Lorman, MS	Game postponed		
20	March 15	at Central Arkansas	Bear Stadium • Conway, AR	L 3-4	10–9	2-2
21	March 16	at Central Arkansas	Bear Stadium • Conway, AR	L 0-5	10–10	2-3
22	March 17	at Central Arkansas	Bear Stadium • Conway, AR	W 2-1	11–10	3-3
23	March 20	at LSU	Alex Box Stadium, Skip Bertman Field • Baton Rouge, LA	L 4-5 (10 inn)	11–11	
24	March 22	Texas A&M-Corpus Christi	Ben Meyer Diamond at Ray E. Didier Field • Thibodaux, LA	W 5-3	12–11	4-3
25	March 23	Texas A&M-Corpus Christi	Ben Meyer Diamond at Ray E. Didier Field • Thibodaux, LA	L 3–4 (10 inn)	12–12	4-4
26	March 24	Texas A&M-Corpus Christi	Ben Meyer Diamond at Ray E. Didier Field • Thibodaux, LA	W 6–3	13–12	5–4
26	March 26	vs. Southern Miss	Shrine on Airline • Metairie, LA	L 0–5	13–13	
26	March 29	at Lamar	Vincent–Beck Stadium • Beaumont, TX	W 4–2	14–13	6-4
26	March 30	at Lamar	Vincent–Beck Stadium • Beaumont, TX	W 5–4 (13 inn)	15–13	7-4
26	March 31	at Lamar	Vincent–Beck Stadium • Beaumont, TX	W 6–5	16–13	8-4

April

#	Date	Opponent	Venue	Score	Overall record	SLC record
27	April 2	Southern	Ben Meyer Diamond at Ray E. Didier Field • Thibodaux, LA	W 4-2	17–13	
28	April 5	at Northwestern State	H. Alvin Brown–C. C. Stroud Field • Natchitoches, LA	L 1–7	17–14	8–5
29	April 5	at Northwestern State	H. Alvin Brown–C. C. Stroud Field • Natchitoches, LA	L 7–9	17–15	8–6
30	April 7	at Northwestern State	H. Alvin Brown–C. C. Stroud Field • Natchitoches, LA	L 2–3 (7 inn)	17–16	8–7
31	April 10	at Alcorn State	Foster Baseball Field at McGowan Stadium • Lorman, MS	Game canceled		
32	April 12	Incarnate Word	Ben Meyer Diamond at Ray E. Didier Field • Thibodaux, LA	L 4–6	17–17	8–8
33	April 13	Incarnate Word	Ben Meyer Diamond at Ray E. Didier Field • Thibodaux, LA	W 7–3	18–17	9–8
34	April 14	Incarnate Word	Ben Meyer Diamond at Ray E. Didier Field • Thibodaux, LA	L 4–7	18–18	9–9
35	April 19	at Southeastern Louisiana	Pat Kenelly Diamond at Alumni Field • Hammond, LA	L 1–3	18–19	9-10
36	April 19	at Southeastern Louisiana	Pat Kenelly Diamond at Alumni Field • Hammond, LA	W 4-1	19–19	10–10
37	April 20	Southeastern Louisiana	Ben Meyer Diamond at Ray E. Didier Field • Thibodaux, LA	L 1–11	19–20	10–11
38	April 23	at Jackson State	Braddy Field • Jackson, MS	L 0–6	19–21	
39	April 24	LSU-Alexandria	Ben Meyer Diamond at Ray E. Didier Field • Thibodaux, LA	W 3–0	20–21	
40	April 26	San Jose State	Ben Meyer Diamond at Ray E. Didier Field • Thibodaux, LA	W 3–2	21–21	
41	April 27	San Jose State	Ben Meyer Diamond at Ray E. Didier Field • Thibodaux, LA	W 6–5 (16 inn)	22–21	
42	April 28	San Jose State	Ben Meyer Diamond at Ray E. Didier Field • Thibodaux, LA	W 10–7	23–21	

May

#	Date	Opponent	Venue	Score	Overall record	SLC record
43	May 1	at Southern	Lee-Hines Field • Baton Rouge, LA	L 5–6	23–22	
44	May 3	Houston Baptist	Ben Meyer Diamond at Ray E. Didier Field • Thibodaux, LA	L 7-11 (12 inn)	23–23	10–12
45	May 4	Houston Baptist	Ben Meyer Diamond at Ray E. Didier Field • Thibodaux, LA	W 4–3 (15 inn)	24–23	11–12
46	May 5	Houston Baptist	Ben Meyer Diamond at Ray E. Didier Field • Thibodaux, LA	L 3–6	24–24	11–13
47	May 7	at Tulane	Greer Field at Turchin Stadium • New Orleans, LA	W 5–3	25–24	
48	May 10	Stephen F. Austin	Ben Meyer Diamond at Ray E. Didier Field • Thibodaux, LA	L 1–5	25–25	11–14
49	May 11	Stephen F. Austin	Ben Meyer Diamond at Ray E. Didier Field • Thibodaux, LA	W 6-3	26-25	12-14
50	May 12	Stephen F. Austin	Ben Meyer Diamond at Ray E. Didier Field • Thibodaux, LA	W 13–7	27–25	13–14
51	May 16	at Abilene Christian	Crutcher Scott Field • Abilene, TX	L 8–10	27–26	13–15
52	May 17	at Abilene Christian	Crutcher Scott Field • Abilene, TX	L 4–5 (13 inn)	27–27	13–16
53	May 17	at Abilene Christian	Crutcher Scott Field • Abilene, TX	L 2–6	27–28	13–17
