= 2019 Northwestern State Demons baseball team =

American college baseball season

2019 Northwestern State Demons baseball
- Conference: Southland Conference
- Record: 30-25 (15-15 SLC)
- Head coach: Bobby Barbier (3rd season)
- Assistant coaches: Chris Bertrand; Taylor Dugas
- Home stadium: H. Alvin Brown–C. C. Stroud Field

2019 Southland Conference baseball standings
	Conf.				Overall
Team	W		L	PCT	W		L	PCT
Sam Houston State ‍†‍‍	20	–	10	.667	31	–	25	.554
Southeastern Louisiana ‍‍‍	19	–	11	.633	33	–	27	.550
Central Arkansas ‍‍‍	19	–	11	.633	32	–	27	.542
Incarnate Word ‍‍‍	18	–	12	.600	37	–	22	.627
McNeese State ‍‍‡‍^{y}	16	–	14	.533	35	–	26	.574
Stephen F. Austin ‍‍‍	16	–	14	.533	25	–	33	.431
Northwestern State ‍‍‍	15	–	15	.500	30	–	25	.545
Texas A&M–Corpus Christi ‍‍‍	14	–	16	.467	31	–	26	.544
New Orleans ‍‍‍	13	–	17	.433	29	–	27	.518
Abilene Christian ‍‍‍	13	–	17	.433	26	–	26	.500
Nicholls ‍‍‍	13	–	17	.433	27	–	28	.491
Houston Baptist ‍‍‍	10	–	20	.333	18	–	35	.340
Lamar ‍‍‍	9	–	21	.300	18	–	36	.333
† – Conference champion ‡ – Tournament champion y – Invited to the NCAA tournament As of June 5, 2019; Rankings from D1Baseball

The 2019 Northwestern State Demons baseball team represented Northwestern State University in the 2019 NCAA Division I baseball season. The Demons played their home games at H. Alvin Brown–C. C. Stroud Field.

== Roster ==
2019 Northwestern State Demons roster
Pitchers: 6 Reed Michel - Senior; 7 Ridge Heisler - Senior; 8 Nathan Jones - Senior; 12 Austin Reich - Senior; 18 Jerry Maddox - Senior; 20 Jose Vasquez - Senior; 26 Donovan Ohnoutka - Sophomore; 27 Peyton Graham - Junior; 32 Kyle Swanson - Junior; 36 David Hodo - Junior; 37 Nik Millsap - Freshman; 38 Evan Daigle - Sophomore; 39 Cameron Taylor - Sophomore; 40 Cullen McDonald - Senior; 41 Sam Wallace - Senior; 46 Tyler Gatewood - Redshirt Freshman; 55 Tyler Pigott - Senior	Catchers: 13 Marshall Skinner - Junior; 25 Tyler Thibodeaux - Redshirt Freshman; 34 Jakob Nunez - Senior; Infielders: 2 Caleb Ricca - Junior; 5 Sam Taylor - Senior; 14 Austin Stegall - Senior; 15 Payne Rodgers - Freshman; 16 Chaney Dodge - Sophomore; 19 Austin Townsend - Junior; 22 Hilton Brown - Freshman; 31 Landon LeBlanc - Freshman; 33 Peyton Davis - Sophomore	Outfielders: 1 Larson Fontenot - Sophomore; 3 Lenni Kunert - Junior; 11 J.P. Lagreco - Senior; 23 Tyler Smith - Junior; 42 Adam Moncure - Freshman; 45 Jeffrey Elkins - Freshman; 47 Jacob Farrell - Freshman

=== Coaching staff ===
2019 Northwestern State Demons coaching staff
- Bobby Barbier – Head Coach – 3rd year
- Chris Bertrand – Associate Coach & Recruiting Coordinator– 2nd year
- Taylor Dugas – Assistant Head Coach & Hitting Coach – 1st year
- Charley Waldrep – Volunteer Assistant Coach – 2nd year
- Matt Alford – Graduate Manager – 2nd year
- Spencer Goodwin – Graduate Manager – 2nd year
- Brittany Goldberg – Assistant Director Athletic Trainer
- Jason Pugh – Assistant Sports Information
- Elizabeth Holloway – Administrative Assistant

== Schedule ==
2019 Northwestern State Demons baseball game log
Regular season
February

#	Date	Opponent	Venue	Score	Overall record	SLC record
1	February 15	at Houston	Schroeder Park • Houston, TX	L 3–5	0–1	
2	February 16	at Houston	Schroeder Park • Houston, TX	L 4–5	0–2	
3	February 17	at Houston	Schroeder Park • Houston, TX	W 2-1	1–2	
4	February 24	Southern	H. Alvin Brown–C. C. Stroud Field • Natchitoches, LA	W 13–6	2–2	
5	February 24	Southern	H. Alvin Brown-C. C. Stroud Field • Natchitoches, LA	L 5–7	2–3	
6	February 26	Louisiana-Monroe	H. Alvin Brown-C. C. Stroud Field • Natchitoches, LA	W 15–0	3–3	

March

#	Date	Opponent	Venue	Score	Overall record	SLC record
7	March 1	Little Rock	H. Alvin Brown-C. C. Stroud Field • Natchitoches, LA	W 1–0	4–3	
8	March 2	Little Rock	H. Alvin Brown-C. C. Stroud Field • Natchitoches, LA	L 5–7	4–4	
9	March 2	Little Rock	H. Alvin Brown-C. C. Stroud Field • Natchitoches, LA	W 7–5	5–4	
10	March 5	at Louisiana Tech	J. C. Love Field at Pat Patterson Park • Ruston, LA	W 8–4	6–4	
11	March 8	at Abilene Christian	Crutcher Scott Field • Abilene, TX	L 0–4	6–5	0–1
12	March 9	at Abilene Christian	Crutcher Scott Field • Abilene, TX	W 24–11	7–5	1–1
13	March 10	at Abilene Christian	Crutcher Scott Field • Abilene, TX	L 2–6	7–6	1–2
14	March 12	#11 LSU	H. Alvin Brown-C. C. Stroud Field • Natchitoches, LA	W 3-1	8–6	
15	March 15	New Orleans	H. Alvin Brown-C. C. Stroud Field • Natchitoches, LA	W 4-3	9–6	2–2
16	March 16	New Orleans	H. Alvin Brown-C. C. Stroud Field • Natchitoches, LA	L 2-5	9–7	2–3
17	March 17	New Orleans	H. Alvin Brown-C. C. Stroud Field • Natchitoches, LA	W 8-1	10–7	3-3
18	March 19	at Louisiana	M. L. Tigue Moore Field at Russo Park • Lafayette, LA	L 3-8	10–8	
19	March 22	Lamar Cardinals	H. Alvin Brown-C. C. Stroud Field • Natchitoches, LA	L 3–4	10–9	3–4
20	March 23	Lamar	H. Alvin Brown-C. C. Stroud Field • Natchitoches, LA	W 5–2	11–9	4–4
21	March 24	Lamar	H. Alvin Brown-C. C. Stroud Field • Natchitoches, LA	W 10–6	12–9	5–4
22	March 27	at Southern	Lee–Hines Field • Baton Rouge, LA	W 6–3	13–9	
23	March 29	at Houston Baptist	Husky Field • Houston, TX	L 2–10	13–10	5–5
24	March 30	at Houston Baptist	Husky Field • Houston, TX	L 2–12	13–11	5–6
25	March 31	at Houston Baptist	Husky Field • Houston, TX	W 7–5	14–11	6–6

April

#	Date	Opponent	Venue	Score	Overall record	SLC record
28	April 2	Mississippi Valley State	H. Alvin Brown-C. C. Stroud Field • Natchitoches, LA	W 11–0	15–11	
29	April 3	Mississippi Valley State	H. Alvin Brown-C. C. Stroud Field • Natchitoches, LA	W 9-0	16–11	
30	April 5	Nicholls	H. Alvin Brown-C. C. Stroud Field • Natchitoches, LA	W 7–1	17–11	7–6
31	April 6	Nicholls	H. Alvin Brown-C. C. Stroud Field • Natchitoches, LA	W 9–7	18–11	8–6
32	April 7	Nicholls	H. Alvin Brown-C. C. Stroud Field • Natchitoches, LA	W 3–2	19–11	9–6
33	April 10	at Louisiana-Monroe	Warhawk Field • Monroe, LA	L 4–8	19–12	
34	April 12	at Southeastern Louisiana	Pat Kenelly Diamond at Alumni Field • Hammond, LA	L 3–5	19–13	9–7
35	April 13	at Southeastern Louisiana	Pat Kenelly Diamond at Alumni Field • Hammond, LA	L 1–8	19–14	9–8
36	April 14	at Southeastern Louisiana	Pat Kenelly Diamond at Alumni Field • Hammond, LA	W 3–1	20–14	10–8
37	April 17	LSU-Shreveport	H. Alvin Brown-C. C. Stroud Field • Natchitoches, LA	W 6–3	21–14	
38	April 19	McNeese State	H. Alvin Brown-C. C. Stroud Field • Natchitoches, LA	L 4-7	21–15	10–9
39	April 20	McNeese State	H. Alvin Brown-C. C. Stroud Field • Natchitoches, LA	W 6–0	22–15	11–9
40	April 20	McNeese State	H. Alvin Brown-C. C. Stroud Field • Natchitoches, LA	W 6–5	23–15	12-9
41	April 23	at #6 Arkansas	Baum–Walker Stadium • Fayetteville, AR	L 2–19	23–16	
42	April 24	at #6 Arkansas	Baum-Walker Stadium • Fayetteville, AR	W 10–7	24–16	
43	April 26	at Stephen F. Austin	Jaycees Field • Nacogdoches, TX	L 2–4	24–17	12–10
44	April 27	at Stephen F. Austin	Jaycees Field • Nacogdoches, TX	W 7–0	25–17	13–10
44	April 28	at Stephen F. Austin	Jaycees Field • Nacogdoches, TX	L 3–5	25–18	13–11
44	April 30	Louisiana Tech	H. Alvin Brown-C. C. Stroud Field • Natchitoches, LA	W 3–1	26–18	

May

#	Date	Opponent	Venue	Score	Overall record	SLC record
45	May 3	Grambling State	H. Alvin Brown-C. C. Stroud Field • Natchitoches, LA	L 6–7	26–19	13–12
46	May 5	Grambling State	H. Alvin Brown-C. C. Stroud Field • Natchitoches, LA	W 11-2	27–19	14–12
47	May 5	Grambling State	H. Alvin Brown-C. C. Stroud Field • Natchitoches, LA	W 5–4	28–19	15–12
48	May 10	Incarnate Word	H. Alvin Brown-C. C. Stroud Field • Natchitoches, LA	W 7–6	29–19	16–12
49	May 12	Incarnate Word	H. Alvin Brown-C. C. Stroud Field • Natchitoches, LA	L 5–6	29–20	16–13
50	May 12	Incarnate Word	H. Alvin Brown-C. C. Stroud Field • Natchitoches, LA	L 9–12	29–21	16–14
51	May 14	at Louisiana-Monroe	Warhawk Field • Monroe, LA	Game cancelled due to heavy rains in Monroe.		
52	May 16	at Sam Houston State	Don Sanders Stadium • Huntsville, TX	L 5–11	29–22	16–15
53	May 17	at Sam Houston State	Don Sanders Stadium • Huntsville, TX	W 9–4	30–22	17–15
54	May 17	at Sam Houston State	Don Sanders Stadium • Huntsville, TX	L 4–5	30–23	17–16

Postseason
Southland Tournament

#	Date	Opponent	Venue	Score	Overall record	SLC record
55	May 22	vs. (2) Central Arkansas	Constellation Field • Sugar Land, TX	L 0–2	30–24	
56	May 23	vs. (3) Southeastern Louisiana	Constellation Field • Sugar Land, TX	L 4-6	30-25	
