= 2019 Southeastern Louisiana Lions baseball team =

American college baseball season

2019 Southeastern Louisiana Lions baseball
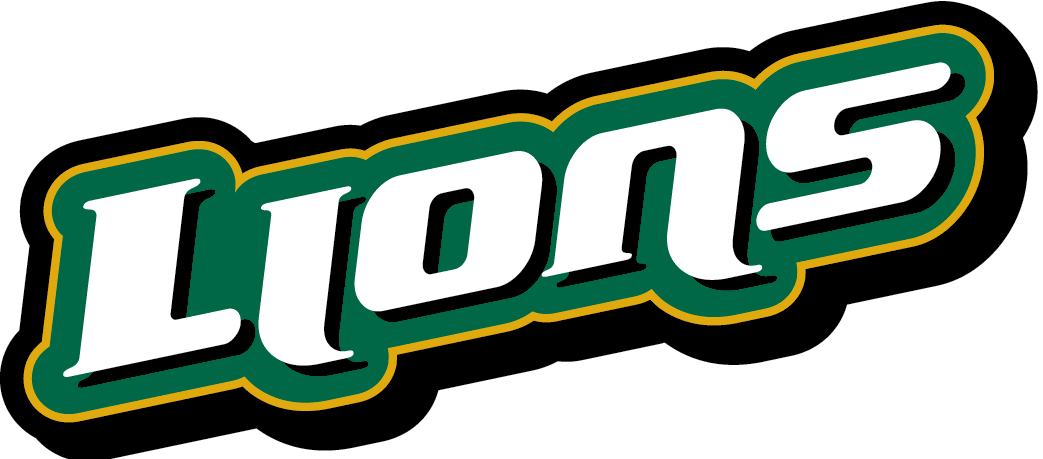
- Conference: Southland Conference
- Record: 33-27 (19-11 SLC)
- Head coach: Matt Riser (6th season)
- Assistant coaches: Andrew Gipson; Tim Donnelly; Trey Caswell
- Home stadium: Pat Kenelly Diamond at Alumni Field

2019 Southland Conference baseball standings
	Conf.				Overall
Team	W		L	PCT	W		L	PCT
Sam Houston State ‍†‍‍	20	–	10	.667	31	–	25	.554
Southeastern Louisiana ‍‍‍	19	–	11	.633	33	–	27	.550
Central Arkansas ‍‍‍	19	–	11	.633	32	–	27	.542
Incarnate Word ‍‍‍	18	–	12	.600	37	–	22	.627
McNeese State ‍‍‡‍^{y}	16	–	14	.533	35	–	26	.574
Stephen F. Austin ‍‍‍	16	–	14	.533	25	–	33	.431
Northwestern State ‍‍‍	15	–	15	.500	30	–	25	.545
Texas A&M–Corpus Christi ‍‍‍	14	–	16	.467	31	–	26	.544
New Orleans ‍‍‍	13	–	17	.433	29	–	27	.518
Abilene Christian ‍‍‍	13	–	17	.433	26	–	26	.500
Nicholls ‍‍‍	13	–	17	.433	27	–	28	.491
Houston Baptist ‍‍‍	10	–	20	.333	18	–	35	.340
Lamar ‍‍‍	9	–	21	.300	18	–	36	.333
† – Conference champion ‡ – Tournament champion y – Invited to the NCAA tournament As of June 5, 2019; Rankings from D1Baseball

The 2019 Southeastern Louisiana Lions baseball team represented Southeastern Louisiana University in the 2019 NCAA Division I baseball season. The Lions played their home games at Pat Kenelly Diamond at Alumni Field.

== Roster ==
2019 Southeastern Louisiana Lions roster
Pitchers: 3 Peyton Lee - Senior; 7 Will Warren - Sophomore; 10 Payton Robinson - Senior; 11 Kade Granier - Redshirt Senior; 12 Bryce Tassin - Redshirt Junior; 18 Noah Hughes - Redshirt Junior; 19 Nick Flesher - Junior; 21 Mason Knopp - Senior; 24 Justin Simanek - Junior; 25 Corey Gaconi - Senior; 29 Carlisle Koestler - Reshirt Senior; 30 Corbin Bozosi - Junior; 34 Jared Biddy - Senior; 35 Kyle Flettrich - Junior; 36 Grant Upton - Freshman; 41 Hunter Arnold - Freshman	Catchers: 5 Connor Manola - Redshirt Freshman; 23 Evan Pace - Senior; 26 Greg Thompson - Senior; 37 Jonathan Parker - Senior; Infielders: 1 Eli Johnson - Junior; 2 Trey Harrington - Sophomore; 6 Cody Grosse - Senior; 13 Brennan Breaud - Senior; 16 Kyle Schimpf - Senior; 27 Scottie Sanders - Redshirt Senior	Outfielders: 4 Nathan Pilutti - Senior; 8 Bryce Steckler - Senior; 15 Trey Shaffer - Sophomore; 31 Brant Husser - Freshman; 32 Nick Ray - Redshirt Freshman; 38 Zane Zeppuhar - Freshman; 40 Trey Jolly - Redshirt Senior; 42 Darius Jones - Redshirt Freshman; Utility Players: 22 Preston Faulkner - Sophomore

=== Coaching staff ===
2019 Southeastern Louisiana Lions coaching staff
- Matt Riser – Head Coach – 6th year
- Andrew Gipson – Associate Coach & Academic Coordinator – 5th year
- Tim Donnelly – Assistant Head Coach & Recruiting Coordinator – 1st year
- Trey Caswell – Assistant Head Coach & Camp Coordinator – 2nd year
- Jake Riser – Director of Baseball Operations & Player Development
- Jackson Colleti – Student Assistant Coach
- Brandon Blackwell – Student Equipment Coordinator
- JP McGee – Student Manager/Bullpen Catcher
- Ben Stewart – Director of Sports Medicine
- Gerry Pacitti – Director of Sports Performance
- Peyton Thomas – Sports Performance Graduate Assistant
- Austin Knight – Academic Counselor for Athletics
- Damon Sunde – associate director of Sports Information

== Schedule ==
2019 Southeastern Louisiana Lions baseball game log
Regular season
February

#	Date	Opponent	Venue	Score	Overall record	SLC record
1	February 15	Louisiana Tech	Pat Kenelly Diamond at Alumni Field • Hammond, LA	L 8–13	0–1	
2	February 16	Louisiana Tech	Pat Kenelly Diamond at Alumni Field • Hammond, LA	L 11–15	0–2	
3	February 17	Louisiana Tech	Pat Kenelly Diamond at Alumni Field • Hammond, LA	L 8-12	0–3	
4	February 19	at #1 LSU	Alex Box Stadium, Skip Bertman Field • Baton Rouge, LA	L 5–6	0–4	
5	February 22	Stony Brook	Pat Kenelly Diamond at Alumni Field • Hammond, LA	W 7–2	1–4	
6	February 23	Stony Brook	Pat Kenelly Diamond at Alumni Field • Hammond, LA	L 4–7	1–5	
7	February 24	Stony Brook	Pat Kenelly Diamond at Alumni Field • Hammond, LA	W 8–0	2–5	
8	February 27	at #9 Mississippi State	Dudy Noble Field, Polk–DeMent Stadium • Starkville, MS	L 0–12	2–6	

March

#	Date	Opponent	Venue	Score	Overall record	SLC record
9	March 1	at Troy	Riddle–Pace Field • Troy, AL	L 2–5	2–7	
10	March 2	at Troy	Riddle-Pace Field • Troy, AL	L 3–8	2–8	
11	March 2	at Troy	Riddle-Pace Field • Troy, AL	W 19–4	3–8	
12	March 5	Louisiana-Monroe	Pat Kenelly Diamond at Alumni Field • Hammond, LA	W 10–3	4–8	
13	March 6	Louisiana-Monroe	Pat Kenelly Diamond at Alumni Field • Hammond, LA	W 7–1	5–8	
14	March 8	Central Arkansas	Pat Kenelly Diamond at Alumni Field • Hammond, LA	L 1–3	5–9	0–1
15	March 9	Central Arkansas	Pat Kenelly Diamond at Alumni Field • Hammond, LA	L 2–3	5–10	0–2
16	March 10	Central Arkansas	Pat Kenelly Diamond at Alumni Field • Hammond, LA	W 3-2	6–10	1-2
17	March 15	at Oklahoma State	Allie P. Reynolds Stadium • Stillwater, OK	L 0-9	6–11	
18	March 16	at Oklahoma State	Allie P. Reynolds Stadium • Stillwater, OK	L 1-5	6–12	
19	March 17	at Oklahoma State	Allie P. Reynolds Stadium • Stillwater, OK	W 5-3	7–12	
20	March 20	Alcorn State	Pat Kenelly Diamond at Alumni Field • Hammond, LA	W 13-3	8–12	
21	March 22	Abilene Christian	Pat Kenelly Diamond at Alumni Field • Hammond, LA	W 14–1	9–12	2–2
22	March 23	Abilene Christian	Pat Kenelly Diamond at Alumni Field • Hammond, LA	W 12–9	10–12	3–2
23	March 24	Abilene Christian	Pat Kenelly Diamond at Alumni Field • Hammond, LA	W 8–3	11–12	4–2
24	March 26	at South Alabama	Eddie Stanky Field • Mobile, AL	W 1–0	12–12	
25	March 29	at Stephen F. Austin	Jaycees Field • Nacogdoches, TX	W 5–1	13–12	5–2
26	March 30	at Stephen F. Austin	Jaycees Field • Nacogdoches, TX	W 11–3	14–12	6–2
27	March 31	at Stephen F. Austin	Jaycees Field • Nacogdoches, TX	L 2–4	14–13	6–3

April

#	Date	Opponent	Venue	Score	Overall record	SLC record
28	April 2	at Louisiana	M. L. Tigue Moore Field at Russo Park • Lafayette, LA	L 2–8	14–14	
29	April 3	Louisiana	Pat Kenelly Diamond at Alumni Field • Hammond, LA	L 8-9	14–15	
30	April 5	at New Orleans (Pontchartrain Bowl)	Maestri Field at Privateer Park • New Orleans, LA	W 7–1	15–15	7–3
31	April 6	at New Orleans (Pontchartrain Bowl)	Maestri Field at Privateer Park • New Orleans, LA	W 7–6	16–15	8–3
32	April 6	at New Orleans (Pontchartrain Bowl)	Maestri Field at Privateer Park • New Orleans, LA	L 4–7	16–16	8–4
33	April 9	Tulane	Pat Kenelly Diamond at Alumni Field • Hammond, LA	L 14–15	16–17	
34	April 12	Northwestern State	Pat Kenelly Diamond at Alumni Field • Hammond, LA	W 5–3	17–17	9–4
35	April 13	Northwestern State	Pat Kenelly Diamond at Alumni Field • Hammond, LA	W 8–1	18–17	10–4
36	April 14	Northwestern State	Pat Kenelly Diamond at Alumni Field • Hammond, LA	L 1–3	18–18	10–5
37	April 16	at McNeese State	Joe Miller Ballpark • Lake Charles, LA	W 12–3	19–18	
38	April 19	Nicholls	Pat Kenelly Diamond at Alumni Field • Hammond, LA	W 3-1	20–18	11–5
39	April 19	Nicholls	Pat Kenelly Diamond at Alumni Field • Hammond, LA	L: 1–4	20–19	11–6
40	April 20	at Nicholls	Ben E. Meyer Diamond at Ray E. Didier Field • Thibodaux, LA	W 11–1	21–19	12-6
41	April 23	at Tulane	Greer Field at Turchin Stadium • New Orleans, LA	W 10–3	22–19	
42	April 26	at Texas A&M-Corpus Christi	Chapman Field • Corpus Christi, TX	W 3–0	23–19	13-6
43	April 27	at Texas A&M-Corpus Christi	Chapman Field • Corpus Christi, TX	W 12–2	24–19	14–6
44	April 28	at Texas A&M-Corpus Christi	Chapman Field • Corpus Christi, TX	L 3–5	24–20	14–7

May

#	Date	Opponent	Venue	Score	Overall record	SLC record
45	May 1	McNeese State	Pat Kenelly Diamond at Alumni Field • Hammond, LA	W 4–3	25–20	
46	May 3	at Lamar	Vincent–Beck Stadium • Beaumont, TX	W 4-3	26–20	15–7
47	May 4	at Lamar	Vincent-Beck Stadium • Beaumont, TX	L 9–13	26–21	15–8
48	May 5	at Lamar	Vincent-Beck Stadium • Beaumont, TX	W 6–4	27–21	16–8
49	May 7	South Alabama	Pat Kenelly Diamond at Alumni Field • Hammond, LA	L 4–14	27–22	
50	May 10	Sam Houston State	Pat Kenelly Diamond at Alumni Field • Hammond, LA	W 3–0	28–22	17–8
51	May 12	Sam Houston State	Pat Kenelly Diamond at Alumni Field • Hammond, LA	L 7-11	28-23	17-9
52	May 12	Sam Houston State	Pat Kenelly Diamond at Alumni Field • Hammond, LA	L 5–14	28–24	17–10
53	May 16	at Incarnate Word	Sullivan Field • San Antonio, TX	W 8–6	29–24	18–10
54	May 17	at Incarnate Word	Sullivan Field • San Antonio, TX	W 5–3	30–24	19–10
55	May 17	at Incarnate Word	Sullivan Field • San Antonio, TX	L 2–7	30–25	19–11

Post-season
Southland Tournament

#	Date	Opponent	Venue	Score	Overall record	SLC record
56	May 22	vs. Stephen F. Austin	Constellation Field • Sugar Land, TX	L 0–5	30–26	
57	May 23	vs. Northwestern State	Constellation Field • Sugar Land, TX	W 6-4	31-26	
58	May 24	vs. Stephen F. Austin	Constellation Field • Sugar Land, TX	W 4-3	32-26	
59	May 24	vs. Central Arkansas	Constellation Field • Sugar Land, TX	W 9-3	33-26	
60	May 25	vs. Central Arkansas	Constellation Field • Sugar Land, TX	L 3-6	33-27	
