= 2019 McNeese State Cowboys baseball team =

American college baseball season

2019 McNeese State Cowboys baseball

Southland Conference Tournament Champions Nashville Regionals Appearance
- Conference: Southland Conference
- Record: 35-27 (16-14 SLC)
- Head coach: Justin Hill (6th season)
- Assistant coaches: Nick Zaleski; Jim Ricklefsen; Will Fox
- Home stadium: Joe Miller Ballpark

2019 Southland Conference baseball standings
	Conf.				Overall
Team	W		L	PCT	W		L	PCT
Sam Houston State ‍†‍‍	20	–	10	.667	31	–	25	.554
Southeastern Louisiana ‍‍‍	19	–	11	.633	33	–	27	.550
Central Arkansas ‍‍‍	19	–	11	.633	32	–	27	.542
Incarnate Word ‍‍‍	18	–	12	.600	37	–	22	.627
McNeese State ‍‍‡‍^{y}	16	–	14	.533	35	–	26	.574
Stephen F. Austin ‍‍‍	16	–	14	.533	25	–	33	.431
Northwestern State ‍‍‍	15	–	15	.500	30	–	25	.545
Texas A&M–Corpus Christi ‍‍‍	14	–	16	.467	31	–	26	.544
New Orleans ‍‍‍	13	–	17	.433	29	–	27	.518
Abilene Christian ‍‍‍	13	–	17	.433	26	–	26	.500
Nicholls ‍‍‍	13	–	17	.433	27	–	28	.491
Houston Baptist ‍‍‍	10	–	20	.333	18	–	35	.340
Lamar ‍‍‍	9	–	21	.300	18	–	36	.333
† – Conference champion ‡ – Tournament champion y – Invited to the NCAA tournament As of June 5, 2019; Rankings from D1Baseball

The 2019 McNeese State Cowboys baseball team represented McNeese State University in the 2019 NCAA Division I baseball season. The Cowboys played their home games at Joe Miller Ballpark. They, along with the LSU Tigers baseball team, and the Southern University baseball team, were the only three teams in the state to make it to the NCAA Tournament. They were also the lone member from the Southland Conference.

== Roster ==
2019 McNeese State Cowboys roster
Pitchers: 3 Zach Rider - Senior; 9 Bryan King - Senior; 14 Brett Payne Freshman; 20 Daniel Hecker - Junior; 22 Andrew Wood - Junior; 25 Adam Goree - Sophomore; 26 Aidan Anderson - Senior; 28 Brad Kincaid - Junior; 30 Peyton McLemore - Senior; 31 Jonathan Ellison - Junior; 32 Hunter Reeves - Junior; 33 John Boushelle - Junior; 35 Cayne Ueckert - Senior; 36 Avery Fliger - Senior; 40 Brody Strahan - Sophomore; 44 Rhett Deaton - Junior; 47 Will Dion - Freshman	Catchers: 12 Schuyler Thibodeaux - Freshman; 13 Brett Whelton - Junior; 15 Dustin Duhon - Senior; 45 Jack Gates - Freshman; Infielders: 1 Reid Bourque - Sophomore; 2 Welles Cooley - Junior; 11 Carson Maxwell - Senior; 38 Mark Johnston - Redshirt Freshman	Outfielders: 4 Shane Selman - Senior; 16 Jake Dickerson - Junior; 18 Payton Harden - Freshman; 27 Julian Gonzales - Sophomore; 34 Clayton Rasbeary - Junior; Utility Players: 8 Jake Cochran - Senior; 10 Nate Fisbeck - Junior; 17 Jacob Stracner - Senior; 24 Peyton Johnson - Sophomore; 41 Zach May - Junior; 43 Austin Nelson - Junior

=== Coaching staff ===
2019 McNeese State Cowboys coaching staff
- Justin Hill – Head Coach – 6th year
- Nick Zaleski – Assistant Coach & Recruiting Coordinator – 2nd year
- Jim Ricklefsen – Assistant Coach – 15th year
- Will Fox – Assistant Coach
- Kate Pinkerton – Graduate Assistant
- Ryan Landry – Assistant Sports Information Director

== Schedule ==
2019 McNeese State Cowboys baseball game log
Regular season
February

#	Date	Opponent	Venue	Score	Overall Record	SLC Record
1	February 15	at UTSA	Roadrunner Field • San Antonio, TX	W 16–5	1–0	
2	February 16	at UTSA	Roadrunner Field • San Antonio, TX	W 12–3	2–0	
3	February 17	at UTSA	Roadrunner Field • San Antonio, TX	L 2-5	2–1	
4	February 20	at Houston	Schroeder Park • Houston, TX	W 13–5 (14 inn)	3–1	
5	February 22	vs. Texas State (Lake Area Classic)	Joe Miller Ballpark • Lake Charles, LA	L 10–18	3–2	
6	February 23	vs. Creighton (Lake Area Classic)	Joe Miller Ballpark • Lake Charles, LA	L 7–11	3–3	
7	February 24	vs. Creighton (Lake Area Classic)	Joe Miller Ballpark • Lake Charles, LA	Game canceled		
8	February 24	vs. Texas State (Lake Area Classic)	Joe Miller Ballpark • Lake Charles, LA	L 3–5 (11 inn)	3–4	
9	February 26	Alcorn State	Joe Miller Ballpark • Lake Charles, LA	W 8–1	4–4	

March

#	Date	Opponent	Venue	Score	Overall Record	SLC Record
10	March 1	vs. Nicholls (Mardi Gras Classic)	Joe Miller Ballpark • Lake Charles, LA	W 7–6	5–4	
11	March 2	vs. Holy Cross (Mardi Gras Classic)	Joe Miller Ballpark • Lake Charles, LA	W 13–0	6–4	
12	March 3	vs. Nicholls (Mardi Gras Classic)	Joe Miller Ballpark • Lake Charles, LA	W 5–4 (10 inn)	7–4	
13	March 4	vs. Holy Cross (Mardi Gras Classic)	Joe Miller Ballpark • Lake Charles, LA	W 4–1	8–4	
14	March 6	Louisiana	Joe Miller Ballpark • Lake Charles, LA	L 10–17	8–5	
15	March 8	at Louisiana-Monroe	Warhawk Field • Monroe, LA	W 13–12	9–5	
16	March 9	at Louisiana-Monroe	Warhawk Field • Monroe, LA	L 5–10	9–6	
17	March 10	at Louisiana-Monroe	Warhawk Field • Monroe, LA	W 10-2	10–6	
18	March 12	at Tulane	Greer Field at Turchin Stadium • New Orleans, LA	L 3–9	10–7	
19	March 15	Lamar	Joe Miller Ballpark • Lake Charles, LA	W 6–1	11–7	1–0
20	March 16	Lamar	Joe Miller Ballpark • Lake Charles, LA	L 1–2 (11 inn)	11–8	1–1
21	March 17	Lamar	Joe Miller Ballpark • Lake Charles, LA	W 6-4	12–8	2-1
22	March 19	Houston	Joe Miller Ballpark • Lake Charles, LA	W 1-0	13–8	
23	March 22	Incarnate Word	Joe Miller Ballpark • Lake Charles, LA	L 1-4	13–9	2-2
24	March 23	Incarnate Word	Joe Miller Ballpark • Lake Charles, LA	L 5-6 (10 inn)	13–10	2-3
25	March 24	Incarnate Word	Joe Miller Ballpark • Lake Charles, LA	L 6-8	13–11	2-4
26	March 26	at #12 LSU	Tiger Park • Baton Rouge, LA	W 2–0	14–11	
27	March 29	at Sam Houston State	Don Sanders Stadium • Huntsville, TX	W 4–3	15–11	3–4

April

#	Date	Opponent	Venue	Score	Overall Record	SLC Record
28	April 3	at Louisiana Tech	J. C. Love Field at Pat Patterson Park • Ruston, LA	L 4-10	15–12	
29	April 5	at Central Arkansas	Bear Stadium • Conway, AR	L 2–4	15–13	3–5
30	April 5	at Central Arkansas	Bear Stadium • Conway, AR	W 2–1	16–13	4–5
31	April 6	at Central Arkansas	Bear Stadium • Conway, AR	L 1–5	16–14	4–6
32	April 10	at Louisiana	M. L. Tigue Moore Field at Russo Park • Lafayette, LA	W 6–3	17–14	
33	April 12	New Orleans	Joe Miller Ballpark • Lake Charles, LA	W 2–1	18–14	5–6
34	April 12	New Orleans	Joe Miller Ballpark • Lake Charles, LA	L 0–2	18–15	5–7
35	April 13	New Orleans	Joe Miller Ballpark • Lake Charles, LA	W 16–4 (7 inn)	19–15	6–7
36	April 16	Southeastern Louisiana	Joe Miller Ballpark • Lake Charles, LA	L 3–12	19–16	
37	April 19	at Northwestern State	H. Alvin Brown–C. C. Stroud Field • Natchitoches, LA	W 7-4	20–16	7–7
38	April 20	at Northwestern State	H. Alvin Brown-C. C. Stroud Field • Natchitoches, LA	L 0–6	20–17	7–8
39	April 20	at Northwestern State	H. Alvin Brown-C. C. Stroud Field • Natchitoches, LA	L 5–6	20–18	7-9
40	April 24	Louisiana Tech	Joe Miller Ballpark • Lake Charles, LA	W 5–3	21–18	
41	April 26	at Abilene Christian	Crutcher Scott Field • Abilene, TX	L 5–9	21–19	7-10
42	April 27	at Abilene Christian	Crutcher Scott Field • Abilene, TX	W 10–4	22–19	8–10
43	April 28	at Abilene Christian	Crutcher Scott Field • Abilene, TX	W 7–6 (10 inn)	23–19	9–10

May

#	Date	Opponent	Venue	Score	Overall Record	SLC Record
44	May 1	at Southeastern Louisiana	Pat Kenelly Diamond at Alumni Field • Hammond, LA	L 3–4	23–20	
45	May 3	Stephen F. Austin	Joe Miller Ballpark • Lake Charles, LA	W 2-0	24–20	10–10
46	May 4	Stephen F. Austin	Joe Miller Ballpark • Lake Charles, LA	W 6–1	25–20	11–10
47	May 5	Stephen F. Austin	Joe Miller Ballpark • Lake Charles, LA	W 5–1	26–20	12–10
48	May 8	Prairie View A&M	Joe Miller Ballpark • Lake Charles, LA	W 4–1	27–20	
49	May 10	Texas A&M-Corpus Christi	Joe Miller Ballpark • Lake Charles, LA	W 5–2	28–20	13–10
50	May 12	Texas A&M-Corpus Christi	Joe Miller Ballpark • Lake Charles, LA	L 0-2	28-21	13-11
51	May 12	Texas A&M-Corpus Christi	Joe Miller Ballpark • Lake Charles, LA	W 8–4	29–21	14–11
52	May 16	at Houston Baptist	Husky Field • Houston, TX	L 2–6	29–22	14–12
53	May 17	at Houston Baptist	Husky Field • Houston, TX	W 16–6	30–22	15–12
53	May 18	at Houston Baptist	Husky Field • Houston, TX	W 5–1	31–22	16–12

Post-season
Southland Tournament

#	Date	Opponent	Venue	Score	Overall Record	SLC Record
54	May 22	vs. Incarnate Word	Constellation Field • Sugar Land, TX	W 2–1	32–22	
55	May 23	vs. Texas A&M-Corpus Christi	Constellation Field • Sugar Land, TX	W 7-2	33-22	
56	May 24	vs. Incarnate Word	Constellation Field • Sugar Land, TX	W 5-3	34-22	
57	May 24	vs. Central Arkansas	Constellation Field • Sugar Land, TX	W 4-2	35-22	

NCAA Tournament - Nashville Regional

#	Date	Opponent	Venue	Score	Overall Record	SLC Record
58	May 31	vs. Indiana State	Hawkins Field • Nashville, TN	L 5-6	35-23	
59	June 1	vs. Ohio State	Hawkins Field • Nashville, TN	L 8-9 (13 inn)	35-24	

== Nashville Regional ==
Nashville Regional Teams
(1) Vanderbilt Commodores	(2) Indiana State Sycamores	(3) McNeese State Cowboys	(4) Ohio State Buckeyes

First Round
1	Vanderbilt	8
4	Ohio State	2
3	McNeese State	5
2	Indiana State	6
Lower round 1
4	Ohio State	9
3	McNeese State	8

Semi-Finals
1	Vanderbilt	8
2	Indiana State	5
Lower final
2	Indiana State	10
4	Ohio State	5

Finals
1	Vanderbilt
2	Indiana State
