= 2019 NCAA Division I baseball season =

College baseball in the United States

- Duration: February 15 – June 26, 2019
- Number of teams: 297
- Preseason No. 1: LSU (CB), Vanderbilt (BA)
- Defending champions: Oregon State
- TV partner/s: ESPN

Tournament
- Duration: May 30 - June 26, 2019
- Most conference bids: SEC (10)

College World Series
- Duration: June 15–26, 2019
- Champions: Vanderbilt (2nd title)
- Runners-up: Michigan (8th CWS Appearance)
- Winning coach: Tim Corbin (2nd title)
- MOP: Kumar Rocker (Vanderbilt)

Seasons
- ← 2018 2020 →

The 2019 NCAA Division I Baseball season, play of college baseball in the United States organized by the National Collegiate Athletic Association (NCAA) at the Division I level, began February 15, 2019. The season progressed through the regular season, many conference tournaments and championship series, and concluded with the 2019 NCAA Division I baseball tournament and 2019 College World Series. The College World Series, consisting of the eight remaining teams in the NCAA tournament and held annually in Omaha, Nebraska, at TD Ameritrade Park Omaha, ended on June 26, 2019. The Vanderbilt Commodores won the tournament, and were consequently named national champions.

== Realignment and format changes ==
- Liberty, after 27 seasons in the Big South Conference, joined the Atlantic Sun Conference (ASUN) on July 1, 2018.
- USC Upstate, after 11 years in the ASUN, moved to the Big South.
- North Alabama upgraded its program from NCAA Division II, joining the Atlantic Sun Conference.

Finally, one other Division I team changed its institutional and athletic identities immediately after the 2017–18 season. Indiana University and Purdue University dissolved Indiana University – Purdue University Fort Wayne (IPFW) on July 1, 2018. IPFW's academic programs in health sciences transferred to the IU system as Indiana University Fort Wayne; all remaining academic programs were transferred to the Purdue system as Purdue University Fort Wayne (PFW). From 2018–19, the former IPFW athletic program represents only PFW, and its Summit League membership was assumed by PFW. Shortly before the dissolution took effect, but after the school's baseball season had finished, the athletic program announced that it would henceforth be known as the Purdue Fort Wayne Mastodons.

On October 3, 2018, Long Island University announced that it would merge its two current athletic programs—the LIU Brooklyn Blackbirds, members of the Northeast Conference (NEC), and LIU Post Pioneers, a Division II program in the East Coast Conference—into a single Division I program effective with the 2019–20 school year. The new program will compete under the LIU name with a new nickname. With both campuses sponsoring baseball, the unified LIU team will maintain LIU Brooklyn's NEC membership, but will be based on the Post campus in Brookville, New York.

== Ballpark changes ==
- The 2019 season was the first for Kentucky at their new ballpark Kentucky Proud Park, replacing Cliff Hagan Stadium.
- The 2019 season was the last for UConn at J.O. Christian Field before construction of a new stadium, to be known as Elliot Ballpark, that will open for the 2020 season.
- The 2019 season was the last for the Oklahoma State team at Allie P. Reynolds Stadium. The team will move to a new ballpark in 2020.

== Season outlook ==
Collegiate Baseball News
Ranking	Team
1	LSU
2	Vanderbilt
3	UCLA
4	Texas Tech
5	Stanford
6	Florida
7	Oregon State
8	North Carolina
9	Louisville
10	Florida State
11	Ole Miss
12	Coastal Carolina
13	Georgia
14	Texas
15	Clemson
16	Oklahoma State
17	Georgia Tech
18	Cal State Fullerton
19	TCU
20	Duke
21	Baylor
22	NC State
23	Auburn
24	Missouri State
25	Arkansas

Baseball America
Ranking	Team
1	Vanderbilt
2	LSU
3	UCLA
4	Florida
5	North Carolina
6	Florida State
7	Stanford
8	Texas Tech
9	Mississippi State
10	Oregon State
11	Louisville
12	East Carolina
13	Ole Miss
14	Clemson
15	Georgia
16	Baylor
17	Auburn
18	Arkansas
19	Texas
20	Michigan
21	Southern Miss
22	Duke
23	Coastal Carolina
24	Minnesota
25	UC Irvine

USA Today Coaches
Ranking	Team
1	LSU
2	Vanderbilt
3	Florida
4	Texas Tech
5	Oregon State
6	North Carolina
7	UCLA
8	Louisville
9	Stanford
10	Ole Miss
11	Florida State
12	Arkansas
13	Georgia
14	East Carolina
15	Mississippi State
16	Texas
17	TCU
18	Baylor
19	Clemson
20	Auburn
21	Oklahoma State
22	Coastal Carolina
23	NC State
24	Cal State Fullerton
25	Michigan

NCBWA
Ranking	Team
1	Vanderbilt
2	LSU
3	Texas Tech
4	UCLA
5	Oregon State
6	Florida
7	North Carolina
8	Stanford
9	Louisville
10	Florida State
11	Ole Miss
12	Georgia
13	Mississippi State
14	East Carolina
15	Arkansas
16	Baylor
17	Clemson
18	Texas
19	Auburn
20	Oklahoma State
21	TCU
22	Coastal Carolina
23	Michigan
24	Cal State Fullerton
25	Duke
26	Southern Miss
27	Minnesota
28	Wake Forest
29	UC Irvine
30	NC State
31	Georgia Tech
32	Arizona
33	Florida Atlantic
34	Washington
35	Connecticut
36	Missouri State
37	Indiana
38	Tennessee Tech
39	San Diego State
40	Houston

D1Baseball
Ranking	Team
1	Vanderbilt
2	LSU
3	Texas Tech
4	Louisville
5	UCLA
6	Florida
7	North Carolina
8	Oregon State
9	Georgia
10	Ole Miss
11	East Carolina
12	Stanford
13	Florida State
14	Mississippi State
15	Baylor
16	Arkansas
17	Michigan
18	Oklahoma State
19	TCU
20	Wake Forest
21	Coastal Carolina
22	Auburn
23	Texas
24	Clemson
25	Cal State Fullerton

== Conference standings ==
2019 America East Conference baseball standings
	Conf.				Overall
Team	W		L	PCT	W		L	PCT
Stony Brook ‍†‍‡‍^{y}	15	–	9	.625	31	–	23	.574
Albany ‍‍‍	14	–	9	.609	28	–	23	.549
Binghamton ‍‍‍	12	–	9	.571	26	–	24	.520
UMass Lowell ‍‍‍	12	–	12	.500	20	–	36	.357
Maine ‍‍‍	11	–	12	.478	15	–	34	.306
Hartford ‍‍‍	11	–	13	.458	23	–	34	.404
UMBC ‍‍‍	6	–	17	.261	22	–	30	.423
† – Conference champion ‡ – Tournament champion y – Invited to the NCAA tournament As of June 4, 2019; Rankings from D1Baseball

2019 American Athletic Conference baseball standings
	Conf.				Overall
Team	W		L	PCT	W		L	PCT
No. 13 East Carolina ‍†‍‍^{y}	20	–	4	.833	47	–	18	.723
Cincinnati ‍‍‡‍^{y}	13	–	11	.542	31	–	31	.500
Tulane ‍‍‍	12	–	11	.522	32	–	26	.552
UConn ‍‍‍^{y}	12	–	12	.500	39	–	25	.609
Houston ‍‍‍	12	–	12	.500	32	–	24	.571
UCF ‍‍‍	11	–	13	.458	36	–	22	.621
Memphis ‍‍‍	10	–	13	.435	27	–	28	.491
Wichita State ‍‍‍	9	–	15	.375	28	–	31	.475
South Florida ‍‍‍	8	–	16	.333	26	–	27	.491
† – Conference champion ‡ – Tournament champion y – Invited to the NCAA tournament As of July 16, 2019; Rankings from D1Baseball

2019 Atlantic 10 Conference baseball standings
	Conf.						Overall
Team	W		L		T	PCT	W		L		T	PCT
VCU ‍†‍‍	19	–	5	–	0	.792	39	–	19	–	0	.672
Davidson ‍‍‍	14	–	6	–	0	.700	29	–	22	–	0	.569
Dayton ‍‍‍	16	–	8	–	0	.667	32	–	26	–	1	.551
Fordham ‍‍‡‍^{y}	15	–	9	–	0	.625	38	–	24	–	0	.613
Richmond ‍‍‍	13	–	8	–	0	.619	28	–	25	–	1	.528
Rhode Island ‍‍‍	14	–	9	–	0	.609	24	–	29	–	0	.453
Saint Louis ‍‍‍	13	–	11	–	0	.542	25	–	30	–	0	.455
Saint Joseph's ‍‍‍	13	–	11	–	0	.542	21	–	28	–	0	.429
George Washington ‍‍‍	11	–	13	–	0	.458	30	–	24	–	0	.556
UMass ‍‍‍	8	–	14	–	0	.364	18	–	27	–	0	.400
St. Bonaventure ‍‍‍	6	–	18	–	0	.250	13	–	32	–	0	.289
George Mason ‍‍‍	5	–	19	–	0	.208	19	–	35	–	0	.352
La Salle ‍‍‍	4	–	20	–	0	.167	25	–	31	–	0	.446
† – Conference champion ‡ – Tournament champion y – Invited to the NCAA tournament As of June 4, 2019; Rankings from D1Baseball

2019 Atlantic Coast Conference baseball standings
	Conf.				Overall
Team	W		L	PCT	W		L	PCT
Atlantic
No. 3 Louisville ^{x}‍‍‍^{y}	21	–	9	.700	51	–	18	.739
NC State ‍‍‍^{y}	18	–	12	.600	42	–	19	.689
No. 8 Florida State ‍‍‍^{y}	17	–	13	.567	42	–	23	.646
Clemson ‍‍‍^{y}	15	–	15	.500	35	–	26	.574
Wake Forest ‍‍‍	14	–	16	.467	31	–	26	.544
Notre Dame ‍‍‍	13	–	17	.433	24	–	30	.444
Boston College ‍‍‍	12	–	18	.400	31	–	27	.534
Coastal
No. 17 Georgia Tech ^{x}‍‍‍^{y}	19	–	11	.633	43	–	19	.694
No. 19 Miami (FL) ‍‍‍^{y}	18	–	12	.600	41	–	20	.672
No. 15 North Carolina ‍‍‡‍^{y}	17	–	13	.567	46	–	19	.708
No. 16 Duke ‍‍‍^{y}	15	–	15	.500	35	–	27	.565
Virginia ‍‍‍	14	–	16	.467	32	–	24	.571
Virginia Tech ‍‍‍	9	–	21	.300	26	–	27	.491
Pittsburgh ‍‍‍	8	–	22	.267	21	–	34	.382
x – Division champion ‡ – Tournament champion y – Invited to the NCAA tournament As of June 27, 2019; Rankings from D1Baseball

2019 ASUN Conference baseball standings
	Conf.						Overall
Team	W		L		T	PCT	W		L		T	PCT
Florida Gulf Coast ‍†‍‍	16	–	7	–	0	.696	34	–	21	–	0	.618
Liberty ‍‍‡‍^{y}	15	–	9	–	0	.625	43	–	21	–	0	.672
Lipscomb ‍‍‍	14	–	10	–	0	.583	30	–	25	–	0	.545
Jacksonville ‍‍‍	13	–	11	–	0	.542	32	–	27	–	0	.542
North Florida ‍‍‍	12	–	11	–	0	.522	32	–	25	–	0	.561
Stetson ‍‍‍	11	–	12	–	0	.478	27	–	32	–	0	.458
Kennesaw State ‍‍‍	11	–	13	–	0	.458	27	–	29	–	0	.482
North Alabama ‍‍‍	7	–	16	–	0	.304	16	–	38	–	0	.296
NJIT ‍‍‍	7	–	17	–	0	.292	17	–	27	–	1	.389
† – Conference champion ‡ – Tournament champion y – Invited to the NCAA tournament As of June 4, 2019; Rankings from D1Baseball

2019 Big East Conference baseball standings
	Conf.				Overall
Team	W		L	PCT	W		L	PCT
No. 22 Creighton ‍†‍‡‍^{y}	14	–	4	.778	41	–	13	.759
Xavier ‍‍‍	12	–	4	.750	27	–	31	.466
St. John's ‍‍‍	9	–	9	.500	31	–	23	.574
Seton Hall ‍‍‍	9	–	9	.500	25	–	28	.472
Georgetown ‍‍‍	7	–	11	.389	22	–	34	.393
Butler ‍‍‍	6	–	11	.353	26	–	26	.500
Villanova ‍‍‍	4	–	13	.235	13	–	38	.255
† – Conference champion ‡ – Tournament champion y – Invited to the NCAA tournament As of July 16, 2019; Rankings from D1Baseball

2019 Big Ten Conference baseball standings
	Conf.				Overall
Team	W		L	PCT	W		L	PCT
Indiana ‍†‍‍^{y}	17	–	7	.708	37	–	23	.617
No. 2 Michigan ‍‍‍^{y}	16	–	7	.696	50	–	22	.694
Illinois ‍‍‍^{y}	15	–	9	.625	36	–	21	.632
Nebraska ‍‍‍^{y}	15	–	9	.625	32	–	24	.571
Minnesota ‍‍‍	15	–	9	.625	29	–	27	.518
Ohio State ‍‍‡‍^{y}	12	–	12	.500	36	–	27	.571
Iowa ‍‍‍	12	–	12	.500	31	–	24	.564
Maryland ‍‍‍	12	–	12	.500	29	–	29	.500
Northwestern ‍‍‍	11	–	13	.458	24	–	27	.471
Rutgers ‍‍‍	9	–	14	.391	20	–	31	.392
Michigan State ‍‍‍	8	–	15	.348	20	–	34	.370
Purdue ‍‍‍	7	–	16	.304	20	–	34	.370
Penn State ‍‍‍	4	–	18	.182	22	–	27	.449
† – Conference champion ‡ – Tournament champion y – Invited to the NCAA tournament As of July 4, 2019; Rankings from D1Baseball

2019 Big 12 Conference baseball standings
	Conf.				Overall
Team	W		L	PCT	W		L	PCT
No. 4 Texas Tech ‍†‍‍^{y}	16	–	8	.667	46	–	20	.697
No. 23 Baylor ‍‍‍^{y}	14	–	8	.636	35	–	19	.648
No. 11 Oklahoma State ‍‍‡‍^{y}	14	–	9	.609	40	–	21	.656
No. 27 West Virginia ‍‍‍^{y}	13	–	11	.542	38	–	22	.633
Kansas ‍‍‍	12	–	12	.500	32	–	26	.552
TCU ‍‍‍^{y}	11	–	13	.458	34	–	28	.548
Oklahoma ‍‍‍	11	–	13	.458	33	–	23	.589
Kansas State ‍‍‍	8	–	16	.333	25	–	33	.431
Texas ‍‍‍	7	–	16	.304	27	–	27	.500
† – Conference champion ‡ – Tournament champion y – Invited to the NCAA tournament Rankings from Collegiate Baseball

2019 Big South Conference baseball standings
	Conf.				Overall
Team	W		L	PCT	W		L	PCT
Campbell ‍†‍‡‍^{y}	19	–	7	.731	37	–	21	.638
Radford ‍‍‍	19	–	8	.704	30	–	27	.526
Winthrop ‍‍‍	18	–	9	.667	34	–	23	.596
Presbyterian ‍‍‍	16	–	11	.593	30	–	29	.508
High Point ‍‍‍	14	–	13	.519	27	–	27	.500
Gardner–Webb ‍‍‍	14	–	13	.519	25	–	26	.490
Charleston Southern ‍‍‍	11	–	16	.407	23	–	36	.390
USC Upstate ‍‍‍	9	–	17	.346	23	–	30	.434
UNC Asheville ‍‍‍	9	–	18	.333	16	–	36	.308
Longwood ‍‍‍	5	–	22	.185	11	–	41	.212
† – Conference champion ‡ – Tournament champion y – Invited to the NCAA tournament As of June 4, 2019; Rankings from D1Baseball

2019 Big West Conference baseball standings
	Conf.				Overall
Team	W		L	PCT	W		L	PCT
UC Santa Barbara ‍†‍‍^{y}	19	–	5	.792	45	–	11	.804
UC Irvine ‍‍‍	17	–	7	.708	37	–	17	.685
Cal Poly ‍‍‍	17	–	7	.708	28	–	28	.500
Cal State Fullerton ‍‍‍	13	–	11	.542	27	–	26	.509
Cal State Northridge ‍‍‍	9	–	15	.375	23	–	32	.418
UC Davis ‍‍‍	9	–	15	.375	19	–	31	.380
Hawaii ‍‍‍	8	–	16	.333	20	–	30	.400
UC Riverside ‍‍‍	8	–	16	.333	20	–	36	.357
Long Beach State ‍‍‍	8	–	16	.333	14	–	41	.255
† – Conference champion y – Invited to the NCAA tournament As of July 16, 2019; Rankings from D1Baseball

2019 Colonial Athletic Association baseball standings
	Conf.						Overall
Team	W		L		T	PCT	W		L		T	PCT
Elon ‍†‍‍	19	–	5	–	0	.792	33	–	24	–	0	.579
College of Charleston ‍‍‍	16	–	8	–	0	.667	36	–	21	–	0	.632
William & Mary ‍‍‍	12	–	12	–	0	.500	33	–	22	–	0	.600
Northeastern ‍‍‍	12	–	12	–	0	.500	28	–	29	–	0	.491
UNC Wilmington ‍‍‡‍^{y}	12	–	12	–	0	.500	32	–	31	–	0	.508
James Madison ‍‍‍	11	–	13	–	0	.458	31	–	26	–	0	.544
Hofstra ‍‍‍	10	–	14	–	0	.417	18	–	31	–	1	.370
Delaware ‍‍‍	9	–	15	–	0	.375	21	–	33	–	0	.389
Towson ‍‍‍	7	–	17	–	0	.292	14	–	39	–	0	.264
† – Conference champion ‡ – Tournament champion y – Invited to the NCAA tournament As of June 30, 2019; Rankings from D1Baseball

2019 Conference USA baseball standings
	Conf.						Overall
Team	W		L		T	PCT	W		L		T	PCT
Florida Atlantic ‍†‍‍^{y}	22	–	8	–	0	.733	41	–	21	–	0	.661
Southern Miss ‍‍‡‍^{y}	20	–	10	–	0	.667	40	–	21	–	0	.656
Louisiana Tech ‍‍‍	17	–	13	–	0	.567	34	–	24	–	0	.586
Western Kentucky ‍‍‍	16	–	13	–	1	.550	26	–	29	–	1	.473
Old Dominion ‍‍‍	16	–	14	–	0	.533	35	–	21	–	0	.625
Marshall ‍‍‍	14	–	15	–	0	.483	29	–	28	–	0	.509
Rice ‍‍‍	14	–	16	–	0	.467	26	–	33	–	0	.441
UTSA ‍‍‍	13	–	16	–	0	.448	28	–	30	–	0	.483
UAB ‍‍‍	12	–	18	–	0	.400	27	–	29	–	0	.482
FIU ‍‍‍	12	–	18	–	0	.400	23	–	32	–	0	.418
Charlotte ‍‍‍	11	–	18	–	1	.383	21	–	31	–	1	.406
Middle Tennessee ‍‍‍	11	–	19	–	0	.367	18	–	37	–	0	.327
† – Conference champion ‡ – Tournament champion y – Invited to the NCAA tournament As of June 4, 2019; Rankings from D1Baseball

2019 Horizon League baseball standings
	Conf.						Overall
Team	W		L		T	PCT	W		L		T	PCT
Wright State ‍†‍‍	22	–	8	–	0	.733	42	–	17	–	0	.712
Milwaukee ‍‍‍	18	–	11	–	0	.621	35	–	21	–	1	.623
UIC ‍‍‡‍^{y}	18	–	11	–	0	.621	29	–	23	–	0	.558
Northern Kentucky ‍‍‍	12	–	18	–	0	.400	15	–	42	–	0	.263
Oakland ‍‍‍	9	–	18	–	0	.333	11	–	37	–	0	.229
Youngstown State ‍‍‍	7	–	20	–	0	.259	13	–	41	–	0	.241
† – Conference champion ‡ – Tournament champion y – Invited to the NCAA tournament As of June 4, 2019; Rankings from D1Baseball

2019 Ivy League baseball standings
	Conf.				Overall
Team	W		L	PCT	W		L	PCT
Harvard ‍†‍‡‍^{y}	14	–	7	.667	27	–	16	.628
Columbia ‍‍‍	13	–	8	.619	19	–	23	.452
Yale ‍‍‍	12	–	8	.600	18	–	23	.439
Penn ‍‍‍	11	–	10	.524	23	–	18	.561
Brown ‍‍‍	9	–	12	.429	12	–	27	.308
Princeton ‍‍‍	8	–	12	.400	14	–	26	.350
Cornell ‍‍‍	8	–	13	.381	14	–	24	.368
Dartmouth ‍‍‍	8	–	13	.381	15	–	26	.366
† – Conference champion ‡ – Championship Series champion y – Invited to the NCAA tournament As of June 4, 2019; Rankings from D1Baseball

2019 Metro Atlantic Athletic Conference baseball standings
	Conf.						Overall
Team	W		L		T	PCT	W		L		T	PCT
Canisius ‍†‍‍	17	–	7	–	0	.708	24	–	29	–	0	.453
Quinnipiac ‍†‍‡‍^{y}	17	–	7	–	0	.708	30	–	29	–	0	.508
Fairfield ‍‍‍	15	–	9	–	0	.625	35	–	25	–	0	.583
Marist ‍‍‍	15	–	9	–	0	.625	27	–	26	–	0	.509
Manhattan ‍‍‍	15	–	9	–	0	.625	26	–	33	–	0	.441
Monmouth ‍‍‍	13	–	11	–	0	.542	27	–	29	–	1	.482
Siena ‍‍‍	12	–	12	–	0	.500	18	–	33	–	0	.353
Niagara ‍‍‍	9	–	15	–	0	.375	15	–	33	–	0	.313
Rider ‍‍‍	8	–	16	–	0	.333	17	–	36	–	0	.321
Iona ‍‍‍	8	–	16	–	0	.333	14	–	38	–	0	.269
Saint Peter's ‍‍‍	3	–	21	–	0	.125	5	–	46	–	0	.098
† – Conference champion ‡ – Tournament champion y – Invited to the NCAA tournament As of June 4, 2019; Rankings from D1Baseball

2019 Mid-American Conference baseball standings
	Conf.						Overall
Team	W		L		T	PCT	W		L		T	PCT
Central Michigan ‍†‍‡‍^{y}	22	–	5	–	0	.815	47	–	14	–	0	.770
Ball State ‍‍‍	20	–	5	–	0	.800	38	–	19	–	0	.667
Kent State ‍‍‍	17	–	8	–	0	.680	30	–	24	–	0	.556
Miami (OH) ‍‍‍	15	–	11	–	0	.577	37	–	19	–	0	.661
Northern Illinois ‍‍‍	14	–	12	–	0	.538	20	–	36	–	0	.357
Ohio ‍‍‍	12	–	14	–	0	.462	20	–	34	–	0	.370
Western Michigan ‍‍‍	11	–	14	–	0	.440	18	–	31	–	0	.367
Bowling Green ‍‍‍	8	–	18	–	0	.308	16	–	33	–	0	.327
Eastern Michigan ‍‍‍	6	–	21	–	0	.222	11	–	43	–	1	.209
Toledo ‍‍‍	4	–	21	–	0	.160	17	–	36	–	0	.321
† – Conference champion ‡ – Tournament champion y – Invited to the NCAA tournament As of June 4, 2019; Rankings from D1Baseball

2019 Mid-Eastern Athletic Conference baseball standings
	Conf.						Overall
Team	W		L		T	PCT	W		L		T	PCT
Northern
Norfolk State ^{x}‍‍‍	17	–	7	–	0	.708	24	–	26	–	0	.480
Coppin State ‍‍‍	15	–	9	–	0	.625	24	–	24	–	0	.500
Delaware State ‍‍‍	12	–	12	–	0	.500	20	–	25	–	0	.444
Maryland Eastern Shore ‍‍‍	4	–	20	–	0	.167	10	–	44	–	0	.185
Southern
North Carolina A&T ^{x}‍‍‍	16	–	8	–	0	.667	29	–	24	–	0	.547
Florida A&M ‍‍‡‍^{y}	14	–	10	–	0	.583	27	–	34	–	0	.443
North Carolina Central ‍‍‍	10	–	14	–	0	.417	21	–	28	–	0	.429
Savannah State ‍‍‍	10	–	14	–	0	.417	13	–	27	–	1	.329
Bethune-Cookman ‍‍‍	10	–	14	–	0	.417	17	–	38	–	0	.309
x – Division champion ‡ – Tournament champion y – Invited to the NCAA tournament As of June 4, 2019; Rankings from D1Baseball

2019 Missouri Valley Conference baseball standings
	Conf.				Overall
Team	W		L	PCT	W		L	PCT
No. 24 Dallas Baptist ‍†‍‍^{y}	14	–	7	.667	43	–	20	.683
Illinois State ‍†‍‍^{y}	14	–	7	.667	36	–	26	.581
No. 23 Indiana State ‍‍‡‍^{y}	13	–	8	.619	43	–	18	.705
Bradley ‍‍‍	11	–	10	.524	31	–	19	.620
Evansville ‍‍‍	11	–	10	.524	24	–	29	.453
Missouri State ‍‍‍	10	–	11	.476	20	–	36	.357
Valparaiso ‍‍‍	6	–	15	.286	14	–	36	.280
Southern Illinois ‍‍‍	5	–	16	.238	26	–	29	.473
† – Conference champion ‡ – Tournament champion y – Invited to the NCAA tournament As of July 16, 2019; Rankings from D1Baseball

2019 Mountain West Conference baseball standings
	Conf.						Overall
Team	W		L		T	PCT	W		L		T	PCT
No. 25 Fresno State ‍†‍‡‍^{y}	20	–	8	–	1	.707	40	–	16	–	1	.711
San Diego State ‍‍‍	16	–	13	–	0	.552	32	–	25	–	0	.561
Nevada ‍‍‍	14	–	16	–	0	.467	30	–	26	–	0	.536
UNLV ‍‍‍	14	–	16	–	0	.467	29	–	29	–	0	.500
Air Force ‍‍‍	12	–	14	–	0	.462	26	–	26	–	0	.500
San Jose State ‍‍‍	13	–	17	–	0	.433	20	–	34	–	0	.370
New Mexico ‍‍‍	11	–	16	–	1	.411	23	–	28	–	1	.452
† – Conference champion ‡ – Tournament champion y – Invited to the NCAA tournament As of July 16, 2019; Rankings from D1Baseball

2019 Northeast Conference baseball standings
	Conf.						Overall
Team	W		L		T	PCT	W		L		T	PCT
Bryant ‍†‍‍	19	–	5	–	0	.792	40	–	20	–	0	.667
Central Connecticut ‍‍‡‍^{y}	16	–	8	–	0	.667	31	–	23	–	0	.574
Wagner ‍‍‍	11	–	13	–	0	.458	19	–	32	–	0	.373
Sacred Heart ‍‍‍	11	–	13	–	0	.458	19	–	34	–	1	.361
LIU Brooklyn ‍‍‍	10	–	14	–	0	.417	20	–	33	–	0	.377
Fairleigh Dickinson ‍‍‍	9	–	15	–	0	.375	15	–	37	–	1	.292
Mount St. Mary's ‍‍‍	8	–	16	–	0	.333	15	–	35	–	0	.300
† – Conference champion ‡ – Tournament champion y – Invited to the NCAA tournament As of June 4, 2019; Rankings from D1Baseball

2019 Ohio Valley Conference baseball standings
	Conf.				Overall
Team	W		L	PCT	W		L	PCT
Jacksonville State ‍†‍‡‍^{y}	22	–	8	.733	39	–	23	.629
Morehead State ‍‍‍	19	–	11	.633	40	–	21	.656
Austin Peay ‍‍‍	19	–	11	.633	32	–	25	.561
Belmont ‍‍‍	18	–	12	.600	27	–	30	.474
Eastern Kentucky ‍‍‍	16	–	14	.533	32	–	27	.542
Murray State ‍‍‍	16	–	14	.533	24	–	30	.444
Eastern Illinois ‍‍‍	13	–	17	.433	26	–	30	.464
UT Martin ‍‍‍	12	–	18	.400	25	–	31	.446
SIU Edwardsville ‍‍‍	11	–	19	.367	19	–	32	.373
Southeast Missouri State ‍‍‍	10	–	20	.333	23	–	32	.418
Tennessee Tech ‍‍‍	9	–	21	.300	22	–	32	.407
† – Conference champion ‡ – Tournament champion y – Invited to the NCAA tournament As of June 4, 2019; Rankings from D1Baseball

2019 Pac-12 Conference baseball standings
	Conf.						Overall
Team	W		L		T	PCT	W		L		T	PCT
No. 7 UCLA ‍†‍‍^{y}	24	–	5	–	0	.828	52	–	11	–	0	.825
No. 10 Stanford ‍‍‍^{y}	22	–	7	–	0	.759	45	–	14	–	0	.763
Oregon State ‍‍‍^{y}	21	–	8	–	0	.724	36	–	20	–	1	.640
California ‍‍‍^{y}	17	–	11	–	0	.607	32	–	20	–	0	.615
Arizona State ‍‍‍^{y}	16	–	13	–	0	.552	38	–	19	–	0	.667
Arizona ‍‍‍	15	–	14	–	0	.517	32	–	24	–	0	.571
USC ‍‍‍	13	–	15	–	1	.466	25	–	29	–	1	.464
Washington ‍‍‍	12	–	17	–	0	.414	28	–	24	–	0	.538
Oregon ‍‍‍	10	–	19	–	0	.345	27	–	29	–	0	.482
Utah ‍‍‍	6	–	24	–	0	.200	16	–	33	–	0	.327
Washington State ‍‍‍	3	–	25	–	1	.121	11	–	41	–	1	.217
† – Conference champion y – Invited to the NCAA tournament As of July 16, 2019; Rankings from D1Baseball

2019 Patriot League baseball standings
	Conf.				Overall
Team	W		L	PCT	W		L	PCT
Navy ‍†‍‍	18	–	7	.720	39	–	17	.696
Army ‍‍‡‍^{y}	15	–	10	.600	35	–	26	.574
Holy Cross ‍‍‍	15	–	10	.600	22	–	32	.407
Lafayette ‍‍‍	12	–	13	.480	19	–	33	.365
Lehigh ‍‍‍	9	–	16	.360	21	–	28	.429
Bucknell ‍‍‍	6	–	19	.240	14	–	33	.298
† – Conference champion ‡ – Tournament champion y – Invited to the NCAA tournament As of June 4, 2019; Rankings from D1Baseball

2019 Southeastern Conference baseball standings
	Conf.						Overall
Team	W		L		T	PCT	W		L		T	PCT
Eastern
No. 1 Vanderbilt ^{x}‍†‍‡‍^{y}	23	–	7	–	0	.767	58	–	12	–	0	.829
No. 18 Georgia ‍‍‍^{y}	21	–	9	–	0	.700	46	–	17	–	0	.730
Tennessee ‍‍‍^{y}	14	–	16	–	0	.467	40	–	21	–	0	.656
Missouri ‍‍‍	13	–	16	–	1	.450	34	–	22	–	1	.605
Florida ‍‍‍^{y}	13	–	17	–	0	.433	34	–	26	–	0	.567
South Carolina ‍‍‍	8	–	22	–	0	.267	28	–	28	–	0	.500
Kentucky ‍‍‍	7	–	23	–	0	.233	26	–	29	–	0	.473
Western
No. 5 Mississippi State ^{x}‍‍‍^{y}	20	–	10	–	0	.667	52	–	15	–	0	.776
No. 6 Arkansas ^{x}‍‍‍^{y}	20	–	10	–	0	.667	46	–	20	–	0	.697
No. 14 LSU ‍‍‍^{y}	17	–	13	–	0	.567	40	–	26	–	0	.606
No. 20 Texas A&M ‍‍‍^{y}	16	–	13	–	1	.550	39	–	23	–	1	.627
No. 12 Ole Miss ‍‍‍^{y}	16	–	14	–	0	.533	41	–	27	–	0	.603
No. 9 Auburn ‍‍‍^{y}	14	–	16	–	0	.467	38	–	28	–	0	.576
Alabama ‍‍‍	7	–	23	–	0	.233	30	–	26	–	0	.536
x – Division champion † – Conference champion ‡ – Tournament champion y – Invited to the NCAA tournament As of June 25, 2019; Rankings from D1Baseball

2019 Southern Conference baseball standings
	Conf.				Overall
Team	W		L	PCT	W		L	PCT
Samford ‍†‍‍	19	–	5	.792	41	–	19	.683
Wofford ‍‍‍	14	–	9	.609	36	–	25	.590
UNC Greensboro ‍‍‍	14	–	10	.583	34	–	20	.630
Mercer ‍‍‡‍^{y}	14	–	10	.583	35	–	29	.547
Furman ‍‍‍	13	–	11	.542	26	–	31	.456
East Tennessee State ‍‍‍	11	–	12	.478	34	–	21	.618
VMI ‍‍‍	9	–	15	.375	17	–	41	.293
Western Carolina ‍‍‍	8	–	16	.333	21	–	32	.396
The Citadel ‍‍‍	5	–	19	.208	12	–	43	.218
† – Conference champion ‡ – Tournament champion y – Invited to the NCAA tournament As of June 5, 2019; Rankings from D1Baseball

2019 Southland Conference baseball standings
	Conf.				Overall
Team	W		L	PCT	W		L	PCT
Sam Houston State ‍†‍‍	20	–	10	.667	31	–	25	.554
Southeastern Louisiana ‍‍‍	19	–	11	.633	33	–	27	.550
Central Arkansas ‍‍‍	19	–	11	.633	32	–	27	.542
Incarnate Word ‍‍‍	18	–	12	.600	37	–	22	.627
McNeese State ‍‍‡‍^{y}	16	–	14	.533	35	–	26	.574
Stephen F. Austin ‍‍‍	16	–	14	.533	25	–	33	.431
Northwestern State ‍‍‍	15	–	15	.500	30	–	25	.545
Texas A&M–Corpus Christi ‍‍‍	14	–	16	.467	31	–	26	.544
New Orleans ‍‍‍	13	–	17	.433	29	–	27	.518
Abilene Christian ‍‍‍	13	–	17	.433	26	–	26	.500
Nicholls ‍‍‍	13	–	17	.433	27	–	28	.491
Houston Baptist ‍‍‍	10	–	20	.333	18	–	35	.340
Lamar ‍‍‍	9	–	21	.300	18	–	36	.333
† – Conference champion ‡ – Tournament champion y – Invited to the NCAA tournament As of June 5, 2019; Rankings from D1Baseball

2019 Southwestern Athletic Conference baseball standings
	Conf.				Overall
Team	W		L	PCT	W		L	PCT
East
Alabama State ^{x}‍‍‍	18	–	5	.783	28	–	26	.519
Jackson State ‍‍‍	15	–	9	.625	31	–	24	.564
Alabama A&M ‍‍‍	12	–	11	.522	16	–	35	.314
Alcorn State ‍‍‍	7	–	16	.304	14	–	31	.311
Mississippi Valley State ‍‍‍	6	–	17	.261	8	–	27	.229
West
Southern ^{x}‍‍‡‍^{y}	17	–	6	.739	32	–	24	.571
Grambling State ‍‍‍	16	–	8	.667	27	–	25	.519
Texas Southern ‍‍‍	13	–	11	.542	20	–	34	.370
Prairie View A&M ‍‍‍	9	–	14	.391	18	–	35	.340
Arkansas–Pine Bluff ‍‍‍	3	–	19	.136	8	–	42	.160
x – Division champion ‡ – Tournament champion y – Invited to the NCAA tournament As of June 5, 2019; Rankings from D1Baseball

2019 Summit League baseball standings
	Conf.						Overall
Team	W		L		T	PCT	W		L		T	PCT
Omaha ‍†‍‡‍^{y}	20	–	10	–	0	.667	31	–	24	–	1	.563
South Dakota State ‍‍‍	19	–	10	–	0	.655	28	–	22	–	0	.560
Oral Roberts ‍‍‍	17	–	12	–	0	.586	29	–	26	–	0	.527
Western Illinois ‍‍‍	16	–	14	–	0	.533	22	–	31	–	0	.415
North Dakota State ‍‍‍	15	–	15	–	0	.500	19	–	24	–	0	.442
Purdue Fort Wayne ‍‍‍	2	–	28	–	0	.067	7	–	45	–	0	.135
† – Conference champion ‡ – Tournament champion y – Invited to the NCAA tournament As of June 5, 2019; Rankings from D1Baseball

2019 Sun Belt Conference baseball standings
	Conf.						Overall
Team	W		L		T	PCT	W		L		T	PCT
East Division
Georgia Southern ^{x}‍‍‍	18	–	12	–	0	.600	35	–	24	–	0	.593
Coastal Carolina ‍‍‡‍^{y}	15	–	13	–	0	.536	36	–	26	–	1	.579
South Alabama ‍‍‍	16	–	14	–	0	.533	30	–	26	–	0	.536
Troy ‍‍‍	16	–	14	–	0	.533	31	–	29	–	0	.517
Appalachian State ‍‍‍	13	–	16	–	0	.448	22	–	31	–	0	.415
Georgia State ‍‍‍	6	–	24	–	0	.200	15	–	41	–	0	.268
West Division
Texas State ^{x}‍‍‍	20	–	10	–	0	.667	36	–	20	–	0	.643
Little Rock ‍‍‍	18	–	11	–	0	.621	29	–	28	–	0	.509
Texas–Arlington ‍‍‍	17	–	12	–	0	.586	32	–	26	–	0	.552
Louisiana ‍‍‍	15	–	15	–	0	.500	28	–	31	–	0	.475
Louisiana–Monroe ‍‍‍	12	–	17	–	0	.414	27	–	31	–	0	.466
Arkansas State ‍‍‍	11	–	19	–	0	.367	26	–	29	–	0	.473
x – Division champion ‡ – Tournament champion y – Invited to the NCAA tournament As of June 5, 2019; Rankings from D1Baseball

2019 West Coast Conference baseball standings
	Conf.				Overall
Team	W		L	PCT	W		L	PCT
BYU ‍†‍‍	19	–	8	.704	36	–	17	.679
Gonzaga ‍‍‍	18	–	9	.667	31	–	24	.564
Saint Mary's ‍‍‍	17	–	10	.630	35	–	22	.614
Loyola Marymount ‍‍‡‍^{y}	15	–	12	.556	34	–	25	.576
San Francisco ‍‍‍	15	–	12	.556	30	–	26	.536
Pepperdine ‍‍‍	14	–	13	.519	24	–	25	.490
San Diego ‍‍‍	14	–	13	.519	32	–	21	.604
Pacific ‍‍‍	10	–	16	.385	23	–	26	.469
Portland ‍‍‍	7	–	19	.269	25	–	27	.481
Santa Clara ‍‍‍	5	–	22	.185	12	–	40	.231
† – Conference champion ‡ – Tournament champion y – Invited to the NCAA tournament As of June 5, 2019; Rankings from D1Baseball

2019 Western Athletic Conference baseball standings
	Conf.				Overall
Team	W		L	PCT	W		L	PCT
New Mexico State ‍†‍‍	19	–	8	.704	38	–	17	.691
Cal Baptist ‍†‍‍	19	–	8	.704	35	–	20	.636
UTRGV ‍†‍‍	19	–	8	.704	34	–	21	.618
Sacramento State ‍‍‡‍^{y}	18	–	9	.667	40	–	25	.615
Grand Canyon ‍‍‍	18	–	9	.667	36	–	24	.600
Cal State Bakersfield ‍‍‍	12	–	15	.444	24	–	35	.407
Utah Valley ‍‍‍	9	–	18	.333	15	–	41	.268
Northern Colorado ‍‍‍	8	–	19	.296	12	–	35	.255
Seattle ‍‍‍	8	–	19	.296	13	–	39	.250
Chicago State ‍‍‍	5	–	22	.185	10	–	41	.196
† – Conference champion ‡ – Tournament champion y – Invited to the NCAA tournament As of June 4, 2019; Rankings from D1Baseball

=== Conference winners and tournaments ===
Of the 31 Division I athletic conferences that sponsor baseball, 29 ended their regular seasons with a single-elimination tournament or a double elimination tournament. The teams in each conference that won their regular season title are given the number one seed in each tournament. Two conferences, the Big West and Pac-12, did not hold a conference tournament. The winners of those tournaments, plus the Big West and Pac-12 regular-season champions, received automatic invitations to the 2019 NCAA Division I baseball tournament.

Conference	Regular season winner	Conference Player of the Year	Conference Pitcher of the Year	Conference Coach of the Year	Conference tournament	Tournament Venue • City	Tournament winner
America East Conference	Stony Brook	Nick Grande, Stony Brook	Ben Anderson, Binghamton	Jon Mueller, Albany	2019 America East Conference baseball tournament	Varsity Field • Vestal, NY	Stony Brook
American Athletic Conference	East Carolina	Kody Hoese, Tulane	Jake Agnos, East Carolina	Cliff Godwin, East Carolina	2019 American Athletic Conference baseball tournament	Spectrum Field • Clearwater, FL	Cincinnati
Atlantic 10 Conference	VCU	Nate Fassnacht, George Washington	John Stankiewicz, Fordham	Shawn Stiffler, VCU	2019 Atlantic 10 Conference baseball tournament	Houlihan Park • Bronx, NY	Fordham
Atlantic Coast Conference	Atlantic - Louisville; Coastal - Georgia Tech	Bobby Seymour, Wake Forest	Reid Detmers, Louisville	Danny Hall, Georgia Tech	2019 Atlantic Coast Conference baseball tournament	Durham Bulls Athletic Park • Durham, NC	North Carolina
Atlantic Sun Conference	Florida Gulf Coast	Jonathan Embry, Liberty	Brad Deppermann, North Florida	Dave Tollett, Florida Gulf Coast	2019 Atlantic Sun Conference baseball tournament	Melching Field at Conrad Park • DeLand, FL	Liberty
Big 12 Conference	Texas Tech	Josh Jung, Texas Tech & Davis Wendzel, Baylor	Alek Manoah, West Virginia	Randy Mazey, West Virginia	2019 Big 12 Conference baseball tournament	Chickasaw Bricktown Ballpark • Oklahoma City, OK	Oklahoma State
Big East Conference	Creighton	Jake Holton, Creighton	Mitch Ragan, Creighton	Ed Servais, Creighton (Note: The Big East awards a Coaching Staff of the Year award instead of a Coach of the Year award. It goes to the team instead of an individual, although the head coach is cited by name in the award announcement.)	2019 Big East Conference baseball tournament	Prasco Park • Mason, OH	Creighton
Big South Conference	Campbell	Chandler Redmond, Gardner–Webb	Michael Horrell, Campbell	Rusty Stroupe, Gardner–Webb	2019 Big South Conference baseball tournament	Fayetteville Ballpark • Fayetteville, NC	Campbell
Big Ten Conference	Indiana	Jordan Brewer, Michigan	Andrew Saalfrank, Indiana	Jeff Mercer, Indiana	2019 Big Ten Conference baseball tournament	TD Ameritrade Park Omaha • Omaha, NE	Ohio State
Big West Conference	UC Santa Barbara	Eric Yang, UC Santa Barbara (Note: The Big West styles its Player of the Year award as "Field Player of the Year".)	Trenton Denholm, UC Irvine	Andrew Checketts, UC Santa Barbara	no tournament, regular season champion earns auto bid		UC Santa Barbara
Colonial Athletic Association	Elon	Greg Jones, UNC Wilmington	George Kirby, Elon	Mike Kennedy, Elon	2019 Colonial Athletic Association baseball tournament	Eagle Field at Veterans Memorial Park • Harrisonburg, VA	UNC Wilmington
Conference USA	Florida Atlantic	Jake Sanford, Western Kentucky	Matt Canterino, Rice	John McCormack, Florida Atlantic	2019 Conference USA baseball tournament	MGM Park • Biloxi, MS	Southern Miss
Horizon League	Wright State	Peyton Burdick, Wright State	Jacob Key, UIC (starting); Alex Padilla, UIC (relief) (Note: The Horizon League presents separate season-ending awards for starting and relief pitchers. The award for starters is styled as the "Pitcher of the Year" award.)	Alex Sogard, Wright State	2019 Horizon League baseball tournament	Regular season champion home stadium	UIC
Ivy League	Harvard	Jake Suddleson, Harvard	Christian Scafidi, Penn	Bill Decker, Harvard	2019 Ivy League Baseball Championship Series	Campus sites	Harvard
Metro Atlantic Athletic Conference	Canisius/Quinnipiac	Jack Gethings, Fairfield	Matthew Brash, Niagara (starting); Andrew Workman, Quinnipiac (relief) (Note: The Metro Atlantic Athletic conference presents separate season-ending awards for starting and relief pitchers. The award for starters is styled as the "Pitcher of the Year" award.)	Matt Mazurek, Canisius	2019 Metro Atlantic Athletic Conference baseball tournament	Richmond County Bank Ballpark • Staten Island, NY	Quinnipiac
Mid-American Conference	Central Michigan	Rudy Rott, Ohio	Drey Jameson, Ball State	Jordan Bischel, Central Michigan	2019 Mid-American Conference baseball tournament	Sprenger Stadium • Avon, OH	Central Michigan
Mid-Eastern Athletic Conference	Northern - Norfolk State; Southern - North Carolina A&T	Corey Joyce, North Carolina Central	Garrett Lawson, Delaware State	Keith Shumate, Norfolk State	2019 Mid-Eastern Athletic Conference baseball tournament	Jackie Robinson Ballpark • Daytona Beach, FL	Florida A&M
Missouri Valley Conference	Dallas Baptist/Illinois State	Joe Aeilts, Illinois State	Brent Headrick, Illinois State	Steve Holm, Illinois State	2019 Missouri Valley Conference baseball tournament	Duffy Bass Field • Normal, IL	Indiana State
Mountain West Conference	Fresno State	McCarthy Tatum, Fresno State & Bryson Stott, UNLV	Ryan Jensen, Fresno State	Mike Batesole, Fresno State	2019 Mountain West Conference baseball tournament	William Peccole Park • Reno, NV	Fresno State
Northeast Conference	Bryant	Patrick Causa, Mount St. Mary's	Steve Theetge, Bryant	Steve Owens, Bryant	2019 Northeast Conference baseball tournament	Senator Thomas J. Dodd Memorial Stadium • Norwich, CT	Central Connecticut
Ohio Valley Conference	Jacksonville State	Kevin Strohschein, Tennessee Tech	Garrett Farmer, Jacksonville State	Jim Case, Jacksonville State	2019 Ohio Valley Conference baseball tournament	Rent One Park • Marion, IL	Jacksonville State
Pac–12 Conference	UCLA	Adley Rutschman, Oregon State	Ryan Garcia, UCLA	John Savage, UCLA	no tournament, regular season champion earns auto bid		UCLA
Patriot League	Navy	Christian Hodge, Navy	Noah Song, Navy	Paul Kostacopoulos, Navy	2019 Patriot League baseball tournament	Campus sites	Army
Southeastern Conference	East - Vanderbilt; West - Arkansas/Mississippi State	J.J. Bleday, Vanderbilt	Ethan Small, Mississippi State	Tim Corbin, Vanderbilt	2019 Southeastern Conference baseball tournament	Hoover Metropolitan Stadium • Hoover, AL	Vanderbilt
Southern Conference	Samford	Justice Bigbie, Western Carolina	Chad Sykes, UNC Greensboro	Casey Dunn, Samford	2019 Southern Conference baseball tournament	Fluor Field at the West End • Greenville, SC	Mercer
Southland Conference	Sam Houston State	Luis Trevino, Abilene Christian	Corey Gaconi, Southeastern Louisiana	Patrick Hallmark, Incarnate Word	2019 Southland Conference baseball tournament	Constellation Field • Sugar Land, TX	McNeese State
Southwestern Athletic Conference	East - Alabama State; West - Southern	Tyler LaPorte, Southern & Yamil Pagan, Alabama State	Darren Kelly, Alabama State	Kerrick Jackson, Southern	2019 Southwestern Athletic Conference baseball tournament	Wesley Barrow Stadium • New Orleans, LA	Southern
Summit League	Omaha	Spencer Henson, Oral Roberts	Payton Kinney, Omaha	Evan Porter, Omaha	2019 Summit League baseball tournament	J. L. Johnson Stadium • Tulsa, OK	Omaha
Sun Belt Conference	East - Georgia Southern; West - Texas State	Ethan Wilson, South Alabama	Connor Reich, Texas State	Ty Harrington, Texas State	2019 Sun Belt Conference baseball tournament	Springs Brooks Stadium • Conway, SC	Coastal Carolina
West Coast Conference	BYU	Brock Hale, BYU	Codie Paiva, Loyola Marymount	Mike Littlewood, BYU	2019 West Coast Conference baseball tournament	Banner Island Ballpark • Stockton, CA	Loyola Marymount
Western Athletic Conference	Cal Baptist/New Mexico State/UTRGV	Joey Ortiz, Jr., New Mexico State	Logan Rinehart, Jr., California Baptist	Derek Matlock, Texas–Rio Grande Valley	2019 Western Athletic Conference baseball tournament	Hohokam Stadium • Mesa, AZ	Sacramento State

== Final rankings ==
Collegiate Baseball News
Ranking	Team
1	Vanderbilt
2	Michigan
3	Louisville
4	Texas Tech
5	Mississippi State
6	Florida State
7	Arkansas
8	Auburn
9	UCLA
10	Stanford
11	Oklahoma State
12	North Carolina
13	Ole Miss
14	LSU
15	East Carolina
16	Duke
17	Georgia
18	UC Santa Barbara
19	Georgia Tech
20	Oregon State
21	NC State
22	Central Michigan
23	Baylor
24	Miami
25	Fresno State
26	Texas A&M
27	West Virginia
28	Southern Miss
29	Arizona State
30	Creighton

Baseball America
Ranking	Team
1	Vanderbilt
2	Michigan
3	Louisville
4	Texas Tech
5	Mississippi State
6	UCLA
7	Florida State
8	Arkansas
9	Auburn
10	Stanford
11	Oklahoma State
12	East Carolina
13	Ole Miss
14	North Carolina
15	LSU
16	Georgia
17	Georgia Tech
18	Duke
19	Oregon State
20	West Virginia
21	Fresno State
22	Miami
23	Texas A&M
24	UC Santa Barbara
25	Creighton

USA Today Coaches
Ranking	Team
1	Vanderbilt
2	Michigan
3	Louisville
4	Mississippi State
5	Texas Tech
6	Arkansas
7	Florida State
8	UCLA
9	Auburn
10	Stanford
11	Oklahoma State
12	East Carolina
13	North Carolina
14	Ole Miss
15	Georgia
16	LSU
17	Georgia Tech
18	Duke
19	West Virginia
20	Miami
21	Texas A&M
22	UC Santa Barbara
23	Oregon State
24	NC State
25	Creighton

NCBWA
Ranking	Team
1	Vanderbilt
2	Michigan
3	Louisville
4	Texas Tech
5	Mississippi State
6	Florida State
7	Arkansas
8	Auburn
9	UCLA
10	Stanford
11	Oklahoma State
12	Ole Miss
13	East Carolina
14	North Carolina
15	LSU
16	Georgia
17	Duke
18	Georgia Tech
19	West Virginia
20	Texas A&M
21	Oregon State
22	UC Santa Barbara
23	Tennessee
24	Miami
T-25	Baylor
T-25	Creighton
27	Fresno State
T-28	Dallas Baptist
T-28	NC State
30	Indiana State

D1Baseball
Ranking	Team
1	Vanderbilt
2	Michigan
3	Louisville
4	Texas Tech
5	Mississippi State
6	Arkansas
7	UCLA
8	Florida State
9	Auburn
10	Stanford
11	Oklahoma State
12	Ole Miss
13	East Carolina
14	LSU
15	North Carolina
16	Duke
17	Georgia Tech
18	Georgia
19	Miami
20	Texas A&M
21	West Virginia
22	Creighton
23	Indiana State
24	Dallas Baptist
25	Fresno State

== Coaching changes ==
This table lists programs that changed head coaches at any point from the first day of the 2019 season until the day before the first day of the 2020 season.

Team	Former coach	Interim coach	New coach	Reason
Bryant	Steve Owens		Ryan Klosterman	On June 25, Steve Owens accepted the head coaching position at Rutgers, leaving Bryant after nine seasons with a record of 328–184–2. On July 29, Ryan Klosterman was named the new head coach for the 2020 season.
Cal State Northridge	Greg Moore		Dave Serrano	On May 30, Greg Moore was fired after six seasons at Cal State Northridge, going 161–175 at the school. On June 23, Dave Serrano was named the new head coach for the 2020 season.
Charlotte	Loren Hibbs		Robert Woodard	Hibbs announced his retirement after 27 seasons at Charlotte on June 14. On June 29, Robert Woodard was named the new head coach for the 2020 season.
Fairleigh Dickinson		Justin McKay	Rob DiToma	On May 20, Justin McKay was relieved of his duties after one season at Fairleigh Dickinson, going 15-37-1 at the school. On June 20, Rob DiToma was named the new head coach for the 2020 season.
Florida State	Mike Martin		Mike Martin Jr.	Following the Seminoles' elimination from the College World Series on June 19, Mike Martin retired after 40 seasons at Florida State, going 2,029-736-4 at the school. On June 21, his son Mike Martin Jr., a Seminoles assistant for 22 seasons, was promoted to head coach.
Gardner-Webb	Rusty Stroupe		Jim Chester	Following the team's last game of the 2019 season on May 22, Rusty Stroupe retired after seventeen seasons at Gardner-Webb, going 479–475 at the school. On June 14, Jim Chester was named the new head coach for the 2020 season.
Georgia State	Greg Frady		Brad Stromdahl	On May 31, Georgia State announced that head coach Greg Frady's contract would not be renewed. On June 26, Brad Stromdahl was named the new head coach for the 2020 season.
Incarnate Word	Patrick Hallmark		Ryan Shotzberger	On June 16, Pat Hallmark accepted the head coaching position at UTSA, leaving Incarnate Word after two seasons with a record of 66-48. On June 24, Ryan Shotzberger was named the new head coach for the 2020 season.
Long Beach State	Troy Buckley	Greg Bergeron, Dan Ricabal	Eric Valenzuela	On April 11, Troy Buckley was fired in his ninth season after a 5–26 start to the season, going 260-231-1 at the school. Greg Bergeron and Dan Ricabal served as co-interim coaches for the remainder of the season. On June 8, Eric Valenzuela was named the new head coach for the 2020 season.
Louisiana	Tony Robichaux		Matt Deggs	On July 3, Tony Robichaux died at the age of 57 due to a heart attack. He coached the Ragin' Cajuns for 25 seasons finishing his career with Louisiana with a 910–588–2 record. On July 18, Matt Deggs was named the new head coach for the 2020 season.
Loyola Marymount	Jason Gill		Nathan Choate	On June 14, Jason Gill accepted the head coaching position at USC, leaving Loyola Marymount after eleven seasons with a record of 322-286-1. On June 25, Nathan Choate was named the new head coach for the 2020 season.
Morehead State	Mike McGuire		Mik Aoki	On June 18, Mike McGuire accepted the head coaching position at USC Upstate, leaving Morehead State after seven seasons with a record of 228–191. On June 25, Mik Aoki was named the new head coach for the 2020 season.
Nebraska	Darin Erstad		Will Bolt	On June 3, Darin Erstad stepped down after eight seasons at Nebraska, going 267-193-1 at the school. On June 14, Will Bolt was named the new head coach for the 2020 season.
New Mexico State	Brian Green		Mike Kirby	On June 3, Brian Green accepted the head coaching position at Washington State, leaving NMSU after five seasons with a record of 196-137-1. On June 24, Mike Kirby was named the new head coach for the 2020 season.
Notre Dame	Mik Aoki		Link Jarrett	On June 8, Notre Dame announced that head coach Mik Aoki's contract would not be renewed. Aoki went 248–253–1 in nine seasons with Notre Dame. On July 12, Link Jarrett was named the new head coach for the 2020 season.
Oregon	George Horton		Mark Wasikowski	On May 28, Oregon parted ways with George Horton, going 375–281–1 at the school. On June 11, Mark Wasikowski was named the new head coach for the 2020 season.
Oregon State	Pat Casey	Pat Bailey	Mitch Canham	Pat Casey retired at the end of the 2018 season. Pat Bailey served as interim head coach for 2019 season. On June 13, Oregon State announced the hiring of Mitch Canham as head coach.
Purdue	Mark Wasikowski		Greg Goff	On June 11, Steve Owens accepted the head coaching position at Oregon, leaving Purdue after three seasons with a record of 87–82. On June 13, Greg Goff was named the new head coach for the 2020 season.
Purdue Fort Wayne	Bobby Pierce		Doug Schreiber	On July 2, Bobby Pierce stepped down after eleven seasons at Purdue Fort Wayne, going 188–390 at the school. On July 23, Doug Schreiber was named the new head coach for the 2020 season.
Radford	Joe Raccuia		Karl Kuhn	Raccuia resigned from Radford on August 15 after 12 seasons at the helm, effective August 31. On August 22, Karl Kuhn was named the new head coach for the 2020 season.
Rutgers	Joe Litterio		Steve Owens	On May 28, Rutgers announced that head coach, Joe Litterio's, contract would not be renewed. On June 26, Bryant head coach Owens was announced as Litterio's replacement.
Saint Mary's	Eric Valenzuela		Greg Moore	On June 9, Eric Valenzuela accepted the head coaching position at Long Beach State, leaving Saint Mary's after nine seasons with a record of 180–156. On June 15, Greg Moore was named the new head coach for the 2020 season.
Saint Peter's	Danny Ramirez		Lou Proietti	Ramirez resigned from Saint Peter's on May 23 after 3 seasons at the helm. On June 20, Lou Proietti was named the new head coach for the 2020 season.
Sam Houston State	Matt Deggs		Jay Sirianni	On July 18, Matt Deggs accepted the head coaching position at Louisiana, leaving Sam Houston State after five seasons with a record of 187–118. On July 25, Jay Sirianni, a Bearkats assistant for 5 seasons, was promoted to head coach.
Southern Illinois	Ken Henderson		Lance Rhodes	On June 3, Ken Henderson stepped down after nine seasons at Southern Illinois, going 229–286–1 at the school. On June 20, Lance Rhodes was named the new head coach for the 2020 season.
Tennessee Tech	Justin Holmes	Mitchell Wright	Steve Smith	On November 20, Tennessee Tech fired Justin Holmes after only one season for "conduct that is inconsistent with the expectations and standards Tennessee Tech has for all head coaches." Mitchell Wright was named as interim until Auburn pitching coach, Steve Smith, was hired on December 21
Texas State	Ty Harrington		Steven Trout	Harrington announced his retirement after 20 seasons at Texas State on June 20. On July 1, Steven Trout, a Bobcats assistant for 6 seasons, was promoted to head coach.
Toledo	Cory Mee		Rob Reinstetle	On May 20, Cory Mee stepped down after sixteen seasons at Toledo, going 366-513-1 at the school. On July 8, Rob Reinstetle was named the new head coach for the 2020 season.
UMBC	Bob Mumma	Liam Bowen		Mumma resigned from UMBC on May 1 after 8 seasons at the helm. Liam Bowen was named acting head coach. On May 22, Liam Bowen, a Retrievers assistant for 8 seasons, was promoted to head coach.
UNC Greensboro	Link Jarrett		Billy Godwin	On July 12, Link Jarrett accepted the head coaching position at Notre Dame, leaving UNC Greensboro after seven seasons with a record of 215–166. On August 8, Billy Godwin was named the new head coach for the 2020 season.
UNC Wilmington	Mark Scalf		Randy Hood	On February 13, Mark Scalf announced he would retire following the end of the 2019 season. On April 29, Randy Hood, a Seahawks assistant for 18 seasons, was promoted to head coach.
USC	Dan Hubbs		Jason Gill	On May 29, USC announced that head coach Dan Hubbs' contract would not be renewed. The Trojans hired Gill away from fellow Los Angeles school Loyola Marymount, announcing him on June 14.
USC Upstate	Matt Fincher		Mike McGuire	Fincher resigned from USC Upstate on June 4 after 22 seasons at the helm. The Cougars hired Mike McGuire away from Morehead State, announcing him on June 18.
UTSA	Jason Marshall		Patrick Hallmark	Marshall resigned from UTSA on May 27 after 7 seasons at the helm. Like USC would do days later, the Roadrunners stayed local for their new coach, hiring Hallmark away from fellow San Antonio school Incarnate Word on June 11.
Washington State	Marty Lees		Brian Green	On May 21, Marty Lees was fired after four seasons at Washington State, going 68–132–1 at the school. The Cougars hired Green away from New Mexico State, announcing him on June 3.
Western Illinois	Ryan Brownlee			
Wichita State	Todd Butler		Eric Wedge	On May 26, Todd Butler was fired after six seasons at Wichita State, going 169–180–1 at the school. On May 29, Eric Wedge was named the new head coach for the 2020 season.

== See also ==
- 2019 NCAA Division I softball season
