= 2019 Mountain West Conference baseball tournament =

- Teams: 4
- Format: Double-elimination
- Finals site: William Peccole Park; Reno, Nevada
- Champions: Fresno State (1st title)
- Winning coach: Mike Batesole (1st title)
- Television: Stadium (Gms 1-4, 6-7); MW Net (Gm 5)

2019 Mountain West Conference baseball standings
	Conf.						Overall
Team	W		L		T	PCT	W		L		T	PCT
No. 25 Fresno State ‍†‍‡‍^{y}	20	–	8	–	1	.707	40	–	16	–	1	.711
San Diego State ‍‍‍	16	–	13	–	0	.552	32	–	25	–	0	.561
Nevada ‍‍‍	14	–	16	–	0	.467	30	–	26	–	0	.536
UNLV ‍‍‍	14	–	16	–	0	.467	29	–	29	–	0	.500
Air Force ‍‍‍	12	–	14	–	0	.462	26	–	26	–	0	.500
San Jose State ‍‍‍	13	–	17	–	0	.433	20	–	34	–	0	.370
New Mexico ‍‍‍	11	–	16	–	1	.411	23	–	28	–	1	.452
† – Conference champion ‡ – Tournament champion y – Invited to the NCAA tournament As of July 16, 2019; Rankings from D1Baseball

The 2019 Mountain West Conference baseball tournament took place from May 23 through 26. The top four of the league's seven teams met in the double-elimination tournament held at William Peccole Park in Reno, Nevada. The winner of the tournament, Fresno State, earned the Mountain West Conference's automatic bid to the 2019 NCAA Division I baseball tournament.

== Format and seeding ==
The conference's top four teams were seeded based on winning percentage during the round robin regular season schedule. They then played a double-elimination tournament with the top seed playing the fourth seeded team and the second seeded team playing the third seed.

== Bracket ==
First round
1	Fresno State	4
4	Nevada	3
2	San Diego State	3
3	UNLV	9
Lower round 1
4	Nevada	6
2	San Diego State	4

Semi-finals
1	Fresno State	11
3	UNLV	1
Lower final
4	Nevada	5
3	UNLV	6

Finals
1	Fresno State
3	UNLV

== Conference championship ==
Mountain West Championship
(3) UNLV Rebels	vs.	(1) Fresno State Bulldogs

May 25, 2019, 6:30 p.m. (PDT) at William Peccole Park in Reno, Nevada
Team	1	2	3	4	5	6	7	8	9	R	H	E
(3) UNLV	0	0	2	0	2	0	0	0	2	6	11	1
(1) Fresno State	3	1	0	0	1	1	6	0	0	12	13	1
WP: Ryan Sullivan (1–2) LP: Bradley Spooner (2–2); Attendance: 712
