= Nick Restaino =

American college baseball coach

Biographical details
- Education: Fordham University

Coaching career (HC unless noted)
- 1994: Lehman College (asst.)
- 1995–1996: Manhattan (asst.)
- 1997–2004: Fordham (asst.)
- 2005–2011: Fordham
- 2014: Southern Connecticut State (asst.)
- 2015–2017: Sacred Heart (asst.)
- 2018–2022: Sacred Heart

Head coaching record
- Overall: 273–331–3
- Tournaments: NCAA: 0–0

Accomplishments and honors

Awards
- A10 Coach of the Year (2005)

Nick Restaino is an American baseball coach. He served as the head coach of the Fordham Rams (2005–2011) and the Sacred Heart Pioneers (2018–2022).

== Coaching career ==
After graduating from Fordham University in 1993, Restaino became an assistant coach at Lehman College. The next year, Restaino accepted a position as an assistant for the Manhattan Jaspers baseball program. After spending two seasons with the Jaspers, Restaino joined the Fordham Rams baseball staff as an assistant.

On August 5, 2004, Restaino was named the interim head coach at Fordham. Restaino lead the Rams to a 34–21 record, winning the Atlantic 10 Conference Coach of the Year. Following the conclusion of the 2005 season, Fordham removed the interim tag from Restaino's title. After the 2011 season, Restaino decided to leave Fordham to pursue other opportunities.

Restaino joined the Southern Connecticut State University coaching staff in 2014. In 2015, Restaino joined the coaching staff of Sacred Heart. When Nick Giaquinto announced his retirement at the conclusion of the 2016 season, Sacred Heart announced that Restaino would be the next head coach for the Pioneers. On June 17, 2022, Restaino resigned as the head coach of the Pioneers.

== Head coaching record ==
Record table
Season	Team	Overall	Conference	Standing	Postseason
Fordham Rams (Atlantic 10 Conference) (2005–2011)
2005	Fordham	34–21	17–7	2nd (East)	Atlantic 10 Tournament
2006	Fordham	24–32	13–14	7th	
2007	Fordham	35–22	19–8	2nd	Atlantic 10 Tournament
2008	Fordham	29–24–1	13–14	8th	
2009	Fordham	22–32	16–10	5th	Atlantic 10 Tournament
2010	Fordham	21–35	15–12	4th	Atlantic 10 Tournament
2011	Fordham	31–23–1	12–11–1	8th	
Fordham:		196–189–2	105–76		
Sacred Heart Pioneers (Northeast Conference) (2018–2022)
2018	Sacred Heart	17–35	12–16	5th	
2019	Sacred Heart	19–34–1	11–13	4th	Northeast Tournament
2020	Sacred Heart	6–7	0–0		Season canceled due to COVID-19
2021	Sacred Heart	23–25	17–10	3rd	Northeast Tournament
2022	Sacred Heart	12–41	9–18	7th	
Sacred Heart:		77–142–1	49–57		
Total:		273–331–3			
