= Restaino =

Restaino is a surname and given name of Italian origin. Notable people with this name include:

== Given name ==
- Restaino Cantelmo-Stuart (1651–1723), Italian military leader
- Restaino di Tocco Cantelmo Stuart (1730–1796), Italian royal

== Surname ==
- Gary M. Restaino (born 1968), American attorney
- Nick Restaino, American baseball coach
