= Pat Egan (baseball) =

American baseball player & coach (born 1984)

Current position
- Title: Head coach
- Team: Sacred Heart
- Conference: MAAC
- Record: 108–111 (.493)

Biographical details
- Born: October 25, 1984 (age 42); Hartford, Connecticut, U.S.

Playing career

Basketball
- 2002–2003: Quinnipiac

Baseball
- 2003–2007: Quinnipiac
- 2007: Bluefield Orioles
- 2008: Aberdeen IronBirds
- 2009: Delmarva Shorebirds
- 2009–2012: Bowie Baysox
- 2009: Frederick Keys
- 2010–2012: Norfolk Tides
- 2013: Mississippi Braves
- 2013: Gwinnett Braves
- Position: Pitcher

Coaching career (HC unless noted)
- 2015–2022: Quinnipiac (P/RC)
- 2023–present: Sacred Heart

Head coaching record
- Overall: 108–111 (.493)
- Tournaments: NCAA: 0–0

Accomplishments and honors

Championships
- NEC (2024)

Awards
- NEC Pitcher of the Year (2004)

Patrick John Myers Egan (born October 25, 1984) is an American college baseball coach and former professional baseball pitcher, who currently serves as the head baseball coach of the Sacred Heart Pioneers. He played collegiate baseball at Quinnipiac from 2003 to 2007, and played professionally from 2007 to 2013.

== Playing career ==
=== Amateur ===
Egan attended Rocky Hill High School where he played basketball and pitched on the baseball teams. He was a first-team All-Connecticut selection in his senior season for basketball. He would accept a basketball scholarship to join the Quinnipiac Bobcats men's basketball team in the fall of 2002, while attempting to walk-on to the Bobcats' baseball team as well.

As a freshman on the Quinnipiac basketball team, Egan appeared in every game averaging 4.5 points per game, 2.6 rebounds per game.

=== Baltimore Orioles ===
Egan was drafted by the Baltimore Orioles in the 36th round, with the 1,075th overall selection, of the 2006 Major League Baseball draft. He made his professional debut with the rookie-level Bluefield Orioles. Egan made 14 starts for the Low-A Aberdeen IronBirds in 2008, posting a 5-6 record and 3.24 ERA with 72 strikeouts across 77 2/3 innings pitched.

Egan played for the Single-A Delmarva Shorebirds, High-A Frederick Keys, and Double-A Bowie Baysox during the 2009 campaign. In 36 appearances (six starts) for the three affiliates, he compiled a 3-3 record and 1.94 ERA with 75 strikeouts and four saves across 92 2/3 innings pitched. Egan split the 2010 season between Bowie and the Triple-A Norfolk Tides, accumulating a 7-2 record and 3.44 ERA with 42 strikeouts and five saves across 49 appearances out of the bullpen.

On December 9, 2010, the Milwaukee Brewers selected Egan from the Orioles in the Rule 5 draft. On March 24, 2011, Egan was returned to the Orioles organization. He made 40 relief appearances split between Bowie and Norfolk, logging a combined 1-4 record and 4.22 ERA with 44 strikeouts and one save over 64 innings of work.

Egan returned to Bowie and Norfolk for the 2012 season, registering a cumulative 4-1 record and 1.61 ERA with 53 strikeouts and two saves across 67 innings pitched. Egan was released by the Orioles organization on March 29, 2013.

=== Atlanta Braves ===
On April 6, 2013, Egan signed a minor league contract with the Atlanta Braves. He made 54 relief appearances split between the Double-A Mississippi Braves and Triple-A Gwinnett Braves, pitching to a combined 8-3 record and 2.95 ERA with 56 strikeouts and seven saves across 73 1/3 innings of work. Egan elected free agency following the season on November 4.

=== Cincinnati Reds ===
On February 14, 2014, Egan signed a minor league contract with the Cincinnati Reds organization.

== Coaching career ==
On August 10, 2022, Egan was named the head baseball coach of the Sacred Heart Pioneers.

== Head coaching record ==
Record table
Season	Team	Overall	Conference	Standing	Postseason
Sacred Heart Pioneers (Northeast Conference) (2023–2024)
2023	Sacred Heart	28–30	17–13	4th	Northeast Tournament
2024	Sacred Heart	35–23	25–8	1st	Northeast Tournament
Sacred Heart:		– (–)	42–21 (.667)		
Sacred Heart Pioneers (MAAC) (2025–present)
2025	Sacred Heart	28–26	17–13	T–3rd	MAAC Tournament
2026	Sacred Heart	17–32	13–16	9th	
Sacred Heart:		108–111 (.493)	30–29 (.508)		
Total:		108–111 (.493)			
National champion Postseason invitational champion Conference regular season champion Conference regular season and conference tournament champion Division regular season champion Division regular season and conference tournament champion Conference tournament champion
