= 2019 NCAA Division I baseball tournament =

American college sports championship

- Season: 2019
- Teams: 64
- Finals site: TD Ameritrade Park Omaha; Omaha, Nebraska
- Champions: Vanderbilt (2nd title)
- Runner-up: Michigan (8th CWS Appearance)
- Winning coach: Tim Corbin (2nd title)
- MOP: Kumar Rocker (Vanderbilt)
- Television: ESPN

The 2019 NCAA Division I baseball tournament was a tournament of 64-teams to determine the National Collegiate Athletic Association (NCAA) Division I national champion for the 2019 season. The 73rd annual edition of the tournament began on May 31, 2019, and concluded with the 2019 College World Series in Omaha, Nebraska, which started on June 15 and ended on June 26.

Summit League champion Omaha made their first appearance in the tournament.

As a result of a worldwide COVID-19 pandemic that started in late 2019 and subsequently forced the cancellation of the remainder of the 2020 season and tournament, this would be the last tournament held until 2021.

== Tournament procedure ==
A total of 64 teams entered the 2019 tournament. 31 automatic bids were awarded to each program that won their conference's tournament or regular season. The remaining 33 bids were "at-large", with selections extended by the NCAA Selection Committee.

The Selection Committee seeded the national seeds from 1 to 16, each of whom would host their respective regional.

The selections and seedings were completed and revealed on Monday, May 27, 2019, at 12 p.m. EDT on ESPNU.

All qualifying teams were placed into 16 regional double-elimination brackets of four teams. The winners of each regional advanced to a Super Regional in a best-of-three format to advance to the College World Series.

== Schedule and venues ==
The following are the sites that hosted each round of the tournament:

Regionals

- May 31–June 3
  - Foley Field, Athens, Georgia, (Host: University of Georgia)
  - Russ Chandler Stadium, Atlanta, Georgia, (Host: Georgia Institute of Technology)
  - Alex Box Stadium, Baton Rouge, Louisiana, (Host: Louisiana State University)
  - Boshamer Stadium, Chapel Hill, North Carolina, (Host: University of North Carolina)
  - Goss Stadium at Coleman Field, Corvallis, Oregon (Host: Oregon State University)
  - Baum–Walker Stadium, Fayetteville, Arkansas (Host: University of Arkansas)
  - Lewis Field at Clark-LeClair Stadium, Greenville, North Carolina, (Host: East Carolina University)
  - Jackie Robinson Stadium, Los Angeles, California (Host: University of California, Los Angeles)
  - Jim Patterson Stadium, Louisville, Kentucky, (Host: University of Louisville)
  - Dan Law Field at Rip Griffin Park, Lubbock, Texas, (Host: Texas Tech University)
  - Monongalia County Ballpark, Morgantown, West Virginia (Host: West Virginia University)
  - Hawkins Field, Nashville, Tennessee, (Host: Vanderbilt University)
  - Chickasaw Bricktown Ballpark, Oklahoma City, Oklahoma (Host: Oklahoma State University)
  - Swayze Field, Oxford, Mississippi, (Host: University of Mississippi)
  - Klein Field at Sunken Diamond, Stanford, California (Host: Stanford University)
  - Dudy Noble Field at Polk–Dement Stadium, Starkville, Mississippi, (Host: Mississippi State University)

Super Regionals

- June 7–10
  - Jackie Robinson Stadium, Los Angeles
  - Dan Law Field at Rip Griffin Park, Lubbock, Texas
  - Baum–Walker Stadium, Fayetteville, Arkansas
  - Alex Box Stadium, Baton Rouge, Louisiana
  - Boshamer Stadium, Chapel Hill, North Carolina
  - Dudy Noble Field at Polk–Dement Stadium, Starkville, Mississippi
  - Jim Patterson Stadium, Louisville, Kentucky
  - Hawkins Field, Nashville, Tennessee

College World Series

- June 15–26
  - TD Ameritrade Park Omaha, Omaha, Nebraska, (Host: Creighton University)

== Bids ==
=== Automatic bids ===
School	Conference	Record (Conf)	Berth	Last NCAA appearance
Stony Brook	America East	31–21 (15–9)	Tournament	2015 (Fort Worth Regional)
Cincinnati	American	28–29 (13–11)	Tournament	1974 (Minneapolis District)
North Carolina	Atlantic Coast	46–19 (17–13)	Tournament	2018 (College World Series)
Liberty	Atlantic Sun	42–19 (15–9)	Tournament	2014 (Charlottesville Regional)
Fordham	Atlantic 10	38–22 (15–9)	Tournament	1998 (East Regional)
Creighton	Big East	38–11 (13–4)	Tournament	2012 (Los Angeles Regional)
Campbell	Big South	35–19 (19–7)	Tournament	2018 (Athens Regional)
Ohio State	Big Ten	35–25 (12–12)	Tournament	2018 (Greenville Regional)
Oklahoma State	Big 12	36–18 (14–9)	Tournament	2018 (DeLand Regional)
UC Santa Barbara	Big West	45–9 (19–5)	Regular season	2016 (College World Series)
UNC Wilmington	Colonial	32–29 (12–12)	Tournament	2018 (Greenville Regional)
Southern Miss	Conference USA	38–19 (21–10)	Tournament	2018 (Fayetteville Regional)
UIC	Horizon	29–21 (18–11)	Tournament	2017 (Hattiesburg Regional)
Harvard	Ivy League	27–14 (14–7)	Championship series	2005 (Fullerton Regional)
Quinnipiac	MAAC	29–27 (17–7)	Tournament	2005 (Austin Regional)
Central Michigan	Mid-American	46–12 (22–5)	Tournament	1995 (South Regional)
Florida A&M	Mid-Eastern	27–32 (14–10)	Tournament	2015 (Gainesville Regional)
Indiana State	Missouri Valley	41–16 (13–8)	Tournament	2014 (Bloomington Regional)
Fresno State	Mountain West	38–14–1 (21–8–1)	Tournament	2012 (Palo Alto Regional)
Central Connecticut	Northeast	30–21 (16–8)	Tournament	2017 (Fort Worth Regional)
Jacksonville State	Ohio Valley	37–21 (22–8)	Tournament	2014 (Oxford Regional)
UCLA	Pac-12	47–8 (24–5)	Regular season	2018 (Minneapolis Regional)
Army	Patriot	35–24 (15–10)	Tournament	2018 (Raleigh Regional)
Vanderbilt	Southeastern	49–10 (23–7)	Tournament	2018 (Nashville Super Regional)
Mercer	SoCon	35–27 (14–10)	Tournament	2015 (Tallahassee Regional)
McNeese State	Southland	35–24 (16–14)	Tournament	2003 (Houston Regional)
Southern	Southwestern Athletic	32–22 (18–6)	Tournament	2009 (Baton Rouge Regional)
Omaha	Summit	30–22–1 (21–11)	Tournament	First Appearance
Coastal Carolina	Sun Belt	35–24–1 (16–13)	Tournament	2018 (Conway Regional)
Loyola Marymount	West Coast	32–23 (15–12)	Tournament	2000 (Fullerton Regional)
Sacramento State	Western Athletic	39–23 (18–9)	Tournament	2017 (Palo Alto Regional)

=== At–large ===
Team	Conference	Record (Conf)	Last NCAA appearance
Arizona State	Pac-12	37–17 (16–13)	2016 (Fort Worth Regional)
Arkansas	SEC	41–17 (20–10)	2018 College World Series Finals
Auburn	SEC	33–25 (14–16)	2018 (Gainesville Super Regional)
Baylor	Big 12	34–17 (14–8)	2018 (Stanford Regional)
California	Pac-12	32–18 (17–11)	2015 (College Station Regional)
Clemson	ACC	34–24 (15–15)	2018 (Clemson Regional)
UConn	American	36–23 (12–12)	2018 (Conway Regional)
Dallas Baptist	MVC	41–18 (14–7)	2018 (Fayetteville Regional)
Duke	ACC	31–25 (15–15)	2018 (Athens Regional)
East Carolina	American	43–15 (20–4)	2018 (Greenville Regional)
Florida Atlantic	C-USA	40–19 (22–8)	2018 (Gainesville Regional)
Florida	SEC	33–24 (13–17)	2018 College World Series
Florida State	ACC	36–21 (17–13)	2018 (Tallahassee Regional)
Georgia	SEC	44–15 (21–9)	2018 (Athens Regional)
Georgia Tech	ACC	41–17 (19–11)	2016 (Gainesville Regional)
Illinois	Big Ten	36–19 (15–9)	2015 (Champaign Regional)
Illinois State	MVC	34–24 (14–7)	2010 (Louisville Regional)
Indiana	Big Ten	36–21 (17–7)	2018 (Austin Regional)
Louisville	ACC	43–15 (21–9)	2018 (Lubbock Regional)
LSU	SEC	37–24 (17–13)	2018 (Corvallis Regional)
Miami (FL)	ACC	39–18 (18–12)	2016 College World Series
Michigan	Big Ten	41–18 (16–7)	2017 (Chapel Hill Regional)
Mississippi State	SEC	46–13 (20–10)	2018 College World Series
NC State	ACC	42–17 (18–12)	2018 (Raleigh Regional)
Nebraska	Big Ten	31–22 (15–9)	2017 (Corvallis Regional)
Ole Miss	SEC	37–25 (16–14)	2018 (Oxford Regional)
Oregon State	Pac-12	36–18–1 (21–8)	2018 National champions
Stanford	Pac-12	41–11 (22–7)	2018 (Stanford Regional)
TCU	Big 12	32–26 (11–13)	2017 College World Series
Tennessee	SEC	38–19 (14–16)	2005 College World Series
Texas A&M	SEC	37–21–1 (16–13–1)	2018 (Austin Regional)
Texas Tech	Big 12	39–17 (16–8)	2018 College World Series
West Virginia	Big 12	37–20 (13–11)	2017 (Winston-Salem Regional)

=== By Conference ===
Conference	Total	Schools
SEC	10	Arkansas, Auburn, Florida, Georgia, LSU, Mississippi State, Ole Miss, Tennessee, Texas A&M, Vanderbilt
ACC	8	Clemson, Duke, Florida State, Georgia Tech, Louisville, Miami (FL), NC State, North Carolina
Big Ten	5	Illinois, Indiana, Michigan, Nebraska, Ohio State
Big 12	5	Baylor, Oklahoma State, TCU, Texas Tech, West Virginia
Pac-12	5	Arizona State, California, Oregon State, Stanford, UCLA
American	3	Cincinnati, UConn, East Carolina
Missouri Valley	3	Dallas Baptist, Illinois State, Indiana State
Conference USA	2	Florida Atlantic, Southern Miss
America East	1	Stony Brook
Atlantic Sun	1	Liberty
Atlantic 10	1	Fordham
Big East	1	Creighton
Big South	1	Campbell
Big West	1	UC Santa Barbara
Colonial	1	UNC Wilmington
Horizon	1	UIC
Ivy	1	Harvard
MAAC	1	Quinnipiac
Mid-American	1	Central Michigan
Mid-Eastern	1	Florida A&M
Mountain West	1	Fresno State
Northeast	1	Central Connecticut
Ohio Valley	1	Jacksonville State
Patriot	1	Army
SoCon	1	Mercer
Southland	1	McNeese State
Southwestern	1	Southern
Sun Belt	1	Coastal Carolina
Summit	1	Omaha
WAC	1	Sacramento State
West Coast	1	Loyola Marymount

== National seeds ==
The sixteen national seeds, which hosted the regionals, were announced on the Selection Show on May 27 at 12 p.m. EDT on ESPNU. Teams in italics advanced to the Super Regionals. Teams in bold advanced to the College World Series.

1. UCLA
2. **Vanderbilt**
3. Georgia Tech
4. Georgia
5. **Arkansas**
6. **Mississippi State**
7. **Louisville**
8. **Texas Tech**

9. Oklahoma State
10. East Carolina
11. Stanford
12. Ole Miss
13. LSU
14. North Carolina
15. West Virginia
16. Oregon State

== Regionals and Super Regionals ==
Bold indicates winner. Seeds for regional tournaments indicate seeds within regional. Seeds for super regional tournaments indicate national seeds only.

=== Los Angeles Super Regional ===
Regional	Regional
1	**UCLA**	**5**
4	Omaha	2
1	UCLA	2
3	**Loyola Marymount**	**3**
3	**Loyola Marymount**	**3**
2	Baylor	1
Los Angeles Regional – Jackie Robinson Stadium
2	**Baylor**	**24**
4	Omaha	6
2	Baylor	6
1	**UCLA**	**11**
1	Oregon State	6
4	**Cincinnati**	**7**
4	Cincinnati	4
3	**Michigan**	**10**
3	**Michigan**	**6**
2	Creighton	0
Corvallis Regional – Goss Stadium at Coleman Field
1	Oregon State	1
2	**Creighton**	**4**
2	**Creighton**	**6**
4	Cincinnati	1

Regional Final
3	Loyola Marymount	1	3
1	**UCLA**	**6**	**6**
3	**Michigan**	7	**17**
2	Creighton	**11**	6

Super Regional
1	UCLA	2	**5**	2
**Michigan**	**3**	4^{12}	**4**

=== Lubbock Super Regional ===
Regional	Regional
1	**Texas Tech**	**11**
4	Army	2
1	**Texas Tech**	**3**
2	Dallas Baptist	2
3	Florida	8
2	**Dallas Baptist**	**11**
Lubbock Regional – Dan Law Field at Rip Griffin Park
4	Army	5
3	**Florida**	**13**
3	Florida	8
2	**Dallas Baptist**	**9**
1	**Oklahoma State**	**2**
4	Harvard	0
1	**Oklahoma State**	**6**
3	Nebraska	5
3	**Nebraska**	**8**
2	UConn	5
†Oklahoma City Regional – Chickasaw Bricktown Ballpark
4	Harvard	2
2	**UConn**	**10**
2	**UConn**	**16**
3	Nebraska	1

Regional Final
1	**Texas Tech**	**3**	–
2	Dallas Baptist	0	–
1	**Oklahoma State**	2	**3**
2	UConn	**5**	1

Super Regional
8	**Texas Tech**	**8**	5	**8**
9	Oklahoma State	6	**6**	6

†Due to flooding in the Stillwater area, including their home field Allie P. Reynolds Stadium, Oklahoma State hosted their regional at Chickasaw Bricktown Ballpark in Oklahoma City.

=== Fayetteville Super Regional ===
Regional	Regional
1	**Arkansas**	**11**
4	Central Connecticut	5
1	**Arkansas**	**3**
3	TCU	1
3	**TCU**	**13**
2	California	2
Fayetteville Regional – Baum–Walker Stadium
4	**Central Connecticut**	**7**
2	California	4
4	Central Connecticut	5
3	**TCU**	**9**
1	**Ole Miss**	**16**
4	Jacksonville State	2
1	**Ole Miss**	**6**
3	Clemson	1
3	**Clemson**	**8**
2	Illinois	4
Oxford Regional – Swayze Field
4	**Jacksonville State**	**7**
2	Illinois	5
4	**Jacksonville State**	**9**
3	Clemson	2

Regional Final
1	**Arkansas**	**6**	–
3	TCU	0	–
1	**Ole Miss**	**19**	–
4	Jacksonville State	4	–

Super Regional
**5**	**Arkansas**	**11**	5	**14**
12	Ole Miss	2	**13**	1

=== Baton Rouge Super Regional ===
Regional	Regional
1	**Georgia**	**13**
4	Mercer	3
1	Georgia	3
3	**Florida State**	**12**
3	**Florida State**	**13**
2	Florida Atlantic	7
Athens Regional – Foley Field
4	Mercer	6
2	**Florida Atlantic**	**10**
2	Florida Atlantic	0
1	**Georgia**	**13**
1	**LSU**	**17**
4	Stony Brook	3
1	**LSU**	**8**
3	Southern Miss	4
3	**Southern Miss**	**15**
2	Arizona State	3
Baton Rouge Regional – Alex Box Stadium, Skip Bertman Field
4	Stony Brook	5
2	**Arizona State**	**13**
2	Arizona State	12
3	**Southern Miss**	**13**

Regional Final
3	**Florida State**	**10**	–
1	Georgia	1	–
1	**LSU**	**6**	–
3	Southern Miss	4	–

Super Regional
**Florida State**	**6**	**5**	–
13	LSU	4	4^{12}	–

=== Chapel Hill Super Regional ===
Regional	Regional
1	**Georgia Tech**	**13**
4	Florida A&M	2
1	Georgia Tech	5
2	**Auburn**	**6**
3	Coastal Carolina	7
2	**Auburn**	**16**
Atlanta Regional – Russ Chandler Stadium
4	Florida A&M	4
3	**Coastal Carolina**	**9**
3	Coastal Carolina	8
1	**Georgia Tech**	**10**
1	**North Carolina**	**7**
4	UNC Wilmington	6
1	**North Carolina**	**16**
3	Liberty	1
3	**Liberty**	**6**
2	Tennessee	1
Chapel Hill Regional – Boshamer Stadium
4	UNC Wilmington	3
2	**Tennessee**	**10**
2	**Tennessee**	**6**
3	Liberty	5^{10}

Regional Final
2	**Auburn**	**4**	–
1	Georgia Tech	1	–
1	**North Carolina**	**5**	–
2	Tennessee	2	–

Super Regional
**Auburn**	**11**	0	**14**
14	North Carolina	7	**2**	7

=== Starkville Super Regional ===
Regional	Regional
1	**Mississippi State**	**11**
4	Southern	6
1	**Mississippi State**	**7**
3	Central Michigan	2
3	**Central Michigan**	**6**
2	Miami (FL)	5
Starkville Regional – Dudy Noble Field
4	Southern	2
2	**Miami (FL)**	**12**
2	**Miami (FL)**	**18**
3	Central Michigan	3
1	**Stanford**	**11**
4	Sacramento State	0
1	Stanford	2
3	**Fresno State**	**7**
3	**Fresno State**	**9**
2	UC Santa Barbara	2
Stanford Regional – Klein Field at Sunken Diamond
4	**Sacramento State**	**6**
2	UC Santa Barbara	4
4	Sacramento State	3
1	**Stanford**	**12**

Regional Final
1	**Mississippi State**	**5**	–
2	Miami (FL)	2	–
3	Fresno State	6	7
1	**Stanford**	**8**	**9**

Super Regional
6	**Mississippi State**	**6**	**8**	–
11	Stanford	2	1	–

=== Louisville Super Regional ===
Regional	Regional
1	**Louisville**	**5**
4	UIC	3
1	Louisville	2
3	**Illinois State**	**4**
3	**Illinois State**	**8**
2	Indiana	7
Louisville Regional – Jim Patterson Stadium
4	UIC	5
2	**Indiana**	**9**
2	Indiana	7
1	**Louisville**	**9**
1	East Carolina	4
4	**Quinnipiac**	**5**
4	Quinnipiac	8
3	**Campbell**	**9**
3	**Campbell**	**5**
2	NC State	4
Greenville Regional – Clark–LeClair Stadium
1	**East Carolina**	**9**
2	NC State	2
1	**East Carolina**	**13**
4	Quinnipiac	3

Regional Final
3	Illinois State	2	3
1	**Louisville**	**11**	**4**
3	Campbell	3	3
1	**East Carolina**	**10**	**12**

Super Regional
7	**Louisville**	**14**	**12**	–
10	East Carolina	1	0	–

=== Nashville Super Regional ===
Regional	Regional
1	**Vanderbilt**	**8**
4	Ohio State	2
1	**Vanderbilt**	**8**
2	Indiana State	5
3	McNeese State	5
2	**Indiana State**	**6**
Nashville Regional – Hawkins Field
4	**Ohio State**	**9**
3	McNeese State	8^{13}
4	Ohio State	5
2	**Indiana State**	**10**
1	**West Virginia**	**6**
4	Fordham	2
1	West Virginia	0
3	**Duke**	**4**
3	**Duke**	**8**
2	Texas A&M	5
Morgantown Regional – Monongalia County Ballpark
4	Fordham	2
2	**Texas A&M**	**11**
2	**Texas A&M**	**11**
1	West Virginia	10

Regional Final
1	**Vanderbilt**	**12**	–
2	Indiana State	1	–
3	**Duke**	**4**	–
2	Texas A&M	1	–

Super Regional
2	**Vanderbilt**	5	**3**	**13**
Duke	**18**	0	2

== College World Series ==
The College World Series was held at TD Ameritrade Park Omaha in Omaha, Nebraska.

=== Participants ===
School	Conference	Record (Conf)	Head coach	Super Regional	Previous CWS Appearances	CWS Best Finish	CWS W-L Record
Arkansas	SEC	46–18 (20–10)	Dave Van Horn	Fayetteville	9 (last: 2018)	2nd (1979, 2018)	15–18
Auburn	SEC	38–26 (14–16)	Butch Thompson	Chapel Hill	4 (last: 1997)	4th (1967)	3–8
Florida State	ACC	41–21 (17–13)	Mike Martin	Baton Rouge	22 (last: 2017)	2nd (1970, 1986, 1999)	29–44
Louisville	ACC	49–16 (21–9)	Dan McDonnell	Louisville	4 (last: 2017)	5th (2007, 2017)	2–8
Michigan	Big Ten	46–20 (16–7)	Erik Bakich	Los Angeles	7 (last: 1984)	1st (1953, 1962)	12–12
Mississippi State	SEC	51–13 (20–10)	Chris Lemonis	Starkville	10 (last: 2018)	2nd (2013)	12–20
Texas Tech	Big 12	44–18 (16–8)	Tim Tadlock	Lubbock	3 (last: 2018)	5th (2016, 2018)	2–6
Vanderbilt	SEC	54–11 (23–7)	Tim Corbin	Nashville	3 (last: 2015)	1st (2014)	11–6

=== Bracket ===
Seeds listed below indicate national seeds only

First round
**Michigan**	**5**
8	Texas Tech	3
5	Arkansas	0
**Florida State**	**1**
8	**Texas Tech**	**5**
5	Arkansas	4
Auburn	4
6	**Mississippi State**	**5**
7	Louisville	1
2	**Vanderbilt**	**3**
7	**Louisville**	**5**
Auburn	3

Second round
**Michigan**	**2**
Florida State	0
8	**Texas Tech**	**4**
Florida State	1
6	Mississippi State	3
2	**Vanderbilt**	**6**
7	**Louisville**	**4**
6	Mississippi State	3

Semifinals
**Michigan**	**15**	–
8	Texas Tech	3	–
2	**Vanderbilt**	**3**	–
7	Louisville	2	–

Championship
Michigan	**7**	1	2
2	**Vanderbilt**	4	**4**	**8**

=== Game results ===
Date	Game	Winning team	Score	Losing team	Winning pitcher	Losing pitcher	Save	Notes
June 15	Game 1	Michigan	5–3	Texas Tech	Karl Kauffmann (11–6)	Micah Dallas (7–1)	Jeff Criswell (2)	
June 15	Game 2	Florida State	1–0	Arkansas	Drew Parrish (9–5)	Cody Scroggins (3–1)	J.C. Flowers (13)	
June 16	Game 3	Vanderbilt	3–1	Louisville	Drake Fellows (13–1)	Bryan Hoeing (3–4)	Tyler Brown (15)	
June 16	Game 4	Mississippi State	5–4	Auburn	Cole Gordon (5–0)	Tanner Burns (4–4)	–	
June 17	Game 5	Texas Tech	5–4	Arkansas	John McMillon (4–3)	Cody Scroggins (3–2)	Taylor Floyd (4)	Arkansas eliminated
June 17	Game 6	Michigan	2–0	Florida State	Tommy Henry (11–5)	CJ Van Eyk (10–4)	–	
June 19	Game 7	Louisville	5–3	Auburn	Adam Elliott (3–2)	Bailey Horn (4–2)	Michael Kirian (5)	Auburn eliminated
June 19	Game 8	Vanderbilt	6–3	Mississippi State	Kumar Rocker (11–5)	Peyton Plumlee (7–5)	Tyler Brown (16)	
June 19	Game 9	Texas Tech	4–1	Florida State	Bryce Bonnin (7–1)	Conor Grady (9–6)	Taylor Floyd (5)	Florida State eliminated
June 20	Game 10	Louisville	4–3	Mississippi State	Reid Detmers (13–4)	Cole Gordon (5–1)	–	Mississippi State eliminated
June 21	Game 11	Michigan	15–3	Texas Tech	Karl Kauffmann (12–6)	Micah Dallas (7–2)	Jeff Criswell (3)	Texas Tech eliminated
June 21	Game 12	Vanderbilt	3–2	Louisville	Jake Eder (2–0)	Luke Smith (6–1)	Tyler Brown (17)	Louisville eliminated
Finals
June 24	Game 1	Michigan	7–4	Vanderbilt	Tommy Henry (12–5)	Drake Fellows (13–2)	Jeff Criswell (4)	
June 25	Game 2	Vanderbilt	4–1	Michigan	Kumar Rocker (12–5)	Isaiah Paige (4–1)	–	
June 26	Game 3	Vanderbilt	8–2	Michigan	Mason Hickman (9–0)	Karl Kauffmann (12–7)	Jake Eder (4)	Vanderbilt wins CWS

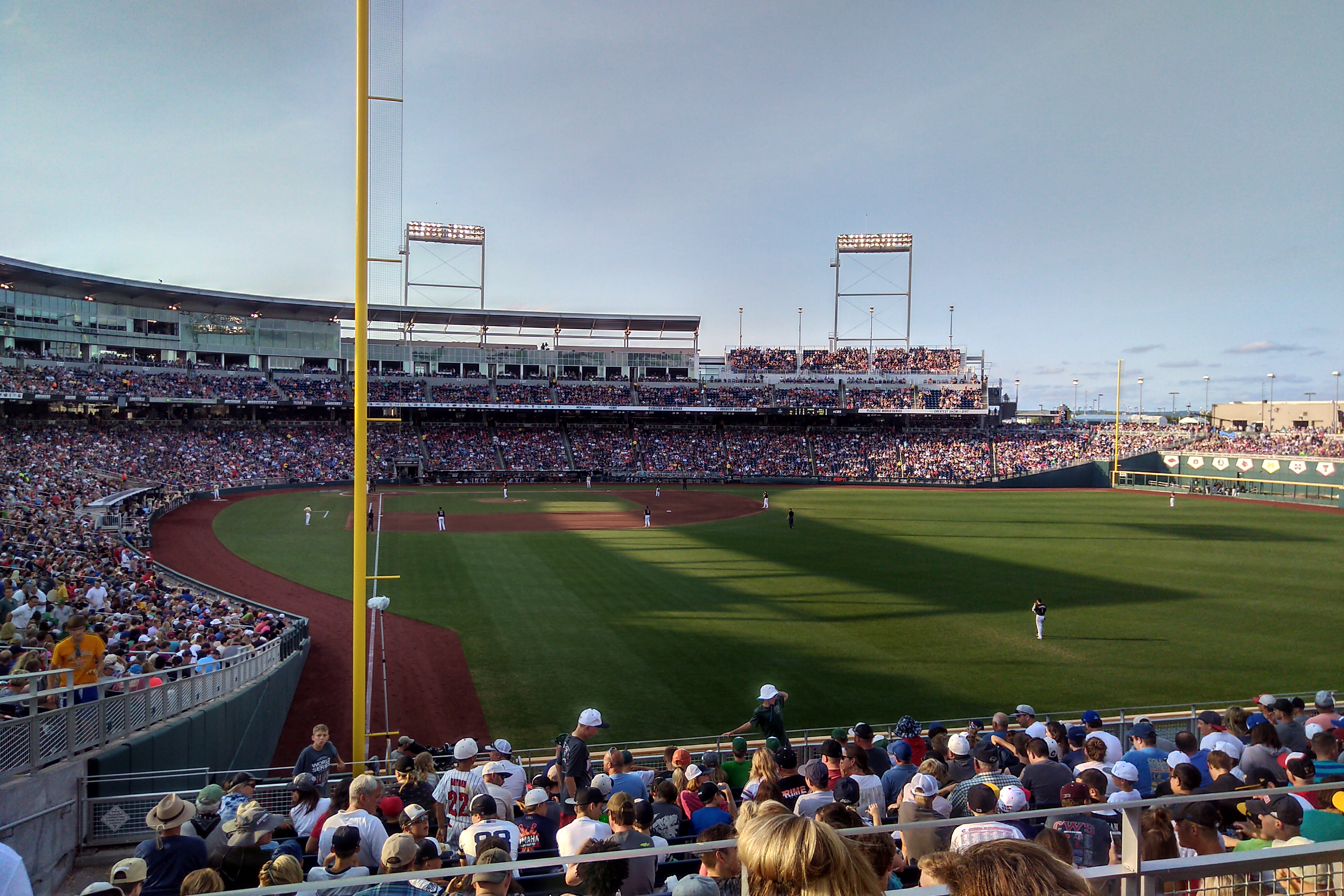
Vanderbilt versus Louisville on June 21

=== All-Tournament Team ===
The following players were members of the College World Series All-Tournament Team.

Position	Player	School
P	**Kumar Rocker (MOP)**	Vanderbilt
P	Tommy Henry	Michigan
C	Philip Clarke	Vanderbilt
1B	Jimmy Kerr	Michigan
2B	Ako Thomas	Michigan
3B	Austin Martin	Vanderbilt
SS	Jack Blomgren	Michigan
OF	J. J. Bleday	Vanderbilt
OF	Drew Campbell	Louisville
OF	Jesse Franklin	Michigan
DH	Cameron Warren	Texas Tech

== Final standings ==
Seeds listed below indicate national seeds only

Place	School	Record
1st	No. 2 Vanderbilt	10–2
2nd	Michigan	9–4
3rd	No. 7 Louisville	8–3
3rd	No. 8 Texas Tech	7–3
5th	Florida State	6–2
5th	No. 6 Mississippi State	6–2
7th	No. 5 Arkansas	5–3
7th	Auburn	5–3
9th	Duke	4–2
9th	No. 10 East Carolina	4–3
9th	No. 13 LSU	3–2
9th	No. 14 North Carolina	4–2
9th	No. 9 Oklahoma State	4–3
9th	No. 12 Ole Miss	4–2
9th	No. 11 Stanford	4–3
9th	No. 1 UCLA	5–3
17th	Campbell	2–2
17th	Creighton	3–2
17th	Dallas Baptist	2–2
17th	Fresno State	2–2
17th	No. 4 Georgia	2–2
17th	No. 3 Georgia Tech	2–2
17th	Illinois State	2–2
17th	Indiana State	2–2
17th	Jacksonville State	2–2
17th	Loyola Marymount	2–2
17th	Miami	2–2
17th	Southern Miss	2–2
17th	TCU	2–2
17th	Tennessee	2–2
17th	Texas A&M	2–2
17th	UConn	3–2
33rd	Arizona State	1–2
33rd	Baylor	1–2
33rd	Central Connecticut State	1–2
33rd	Central Michigan	1–2
33rd	Cincinnati	1–2
33rd	Clemson	1–2
33rd	Coastal Carolina	1–2
33rd	Florida	1–2
33rd	Florida Atlantic	1–2
33rd	Indiana	1–2
33rd	Liberty	1–2
33rd	Nebraska	1–2
33rd	Ohio State	1–2
33rd	Quinnipiac	1–2
33rd	Sacramento State	1–2
33rd	No. 15 West Virginia	1–2
49th	Army	0–2
49th	California	0–2
49th	Florida A&M	0–2
49th	Fordham	0–2
49th	Harvard	0–2
49th	Illinois	0–2
49th	McNeese State	0–2
49th	Mercer	0–2
49th	NC State	0–2
49th	Omaha	0–2
49th	No. 16 Oregon State	0–2
49th	Southern	0–2
49th	Stony Brook	0–2
49th	UC Santa Barbara	0–2
49th	UIC	0–2
49th	UNC Wilmington	0–2

== Record by conference ==
Conference	# of Bids	Record	Win %	Nc Record	Nc Win %	RF	SR	WS	NS	CS	NC
SEC	10	40–22	.645	35–17	.673	9	6	4	1	1	1
Big Ten	5	12–12	.500	12–12	.500	1	1	1	1	1	–
ACC	8	27–17	.614	27–17	.614	6	4	2	1	–	–
Big 12	5	15–12	.556	12–9	.571	3	2	1	1	–	–
Pac-12	5	10–12	.455	10–12	.455	2	2	–	–	–	–
American	3	8–7	.533	8–7	.533	2	1	–	–	–	–
Missouri Valley	3	6–6	.500	6–6	.500	3	–	–	–	–	–
Conference USA	2	3–4	.429	3–4	.429	1	–	–	–	–	–
Big East	1	3–2	.600	3–2	.600	1	–	–	–	–	–
Big South	1	2–2	.500	2–2	.500	1	–	–	–	–	–
Mountain West	1	2–2	.500	2–2	.500	1	–	–	–	–	–
Ohio Valley	1	2–2	.500	2–2	.500	1	–	–	–	–	–
West Coast	1	2–2	.500	2–2	.500	1	–	–	–	–	–
Other	18	6–36	.143	6–36	.143	–	–	–	–	–	–

The columns RF, SR, WS, NS, CS, and NC respectively stand for the Regional Finals, Super Regionals, College World Series Teams, National Semifinals, Championship Series, and National Champion.

Nc is non–conference records, i.e., with the records of teams within the same conference having played each other removed.

== Media coverage ==
=== Radio ===
NRG Media provided nationwide radio coverage of the College World Series through its Omaha Station KOZN, in association with Westwood One. It also streamed all CWS games at westwoodonesports.com on Tunein and on SiriusXM. Kevin Kugler and John Bishop called games leading up to the Championship Series with Gary Sharp acting as the field reporter. The Championship Series was called by Kugler and Scott Graham with Bishop acting as the field reporter.

Kugler lost his voice after the games on June 16, so Jeff Leise (afternoon) and Damon Benning (evening) joined Bishop and Sharp on Westwood One for the games on June 17, 18, and 19 before Kugler returned on the night of the 19.

=== Television ===
ESPN carried every game from the Regionals, Super Regionals, and the College World Series across its networks. During the Regionals and Super Regionals, ESPN offered a dedicated channel, ESPN Bases Loaded (carried in the same channel allotments as its "Goal Line" services for football), which carried live look-ins and analyses across the games in progress.

==== Broadcast assignments ====
===== Regionals =====
- Tom Hart and Kyle Peterson: Athens, Georgia
- Steve Lenox and Rusty Ensor: Atlanta, Georgia
- Mike Morgan and Ben McDonald: Baton Rouge, Louisiana
- Kevin Brown and JP Arencibia: Chapel Hill, North Carolina
- Rich Waltz and Kevin Stocker: Corvallis, Oregon
- Jim Barbar Archived 2019-05-30 at the Wayback Machine and Scott Pose: Fayetteville, Arkansas
- Jon Meterparel and Troy Eklund: Greenville, North Carolina
- Roxy Bernstein and Wes Clements: Los Angeles, California
- Clay Matvick and Chris Burke: Louisville, Kentucky
- Mike Couzens and Greg Swindell: Lubbock, Texas
- Mark Neely and Mike LaValliere: Morgantown, West Virginia
- Dave Neal and Todd Walker: Nashville, Tennessee
- Richard Cross and Lance Cormier: Oxford, Mississippi
- Lowell Galindo and Keith Moreland: Oklahoma City, Oklahoma
- Roy Philpott and Nick Belmonte: Starkville, Mississippi
- Sam Ravech and JT Snow: Stanford, California

===== Super Regionals =====
- Tom Hart, Eduardo Pérez, and Kyle Peterson: Baton Rouge, Louisiana
- Mike Morgan and Greg Swindell: Chapel Hill, North Carolina
- Clay Matvick and Todd Walker: Fayetteville, Arkansas
- Roxy Bernstein and Wes Clements: Los Angeles, California
- Richard Cross and Lance Cormier: Louisville, Kentucky
- Lowell Galindo and Keith Moreland: Lubbock, Texas
- Rich Waltz and Mike Rooney: Nashville, Tennessee
- Dave Neal, Chris Burke, and Ben McDonald: Starkville, Mississippi

===== College World Series =====
- Tom Hart, Chris Burke, Ben McDonald, and Mike Rooney: Afternoons, Thursday night
- Karl Ravech, Eduardo Pérez, Kyle Peterson, and Kris Budden: Evenings minus Thursday

===== CWS Championship Series =====
- Karl Ravech, Eduardo Pérez, Kyle Peterson, and Kris Budden
