= Danny Ramirez (baseball) =

American baseball coach

Playing career
- 1994–1995: Bronx Community College

Coaching career (HC unless noted)
- 2002–2005: New York (NY) La Salle Academy
- 2006–2007: Globe Tech
- 2008–2012: Monroe College (asst.)
- 2017–2019: Saint Peter's

Head coaching record
- Overall: 7–126
- Tournaments: MAAC: 0–0; NCAA: 0–0

Danny Ramirez is an American college baseball coach and former player. Ramirez served as the head coach of the Saint Peter's Peacocks baseball team from 2017 to 2019.

== Playing career ==
Ramirez attended Bronx Community College in New York, New York. While with the Broncos, Ramirez played on a team that was the runner-up in the City University of New York Athletic Conference in 1994, but then won in 1995, en route to a trip to the 1995 JUCO World Series.

== Coaching career ==
Ramirez coached several levels for the Boys & Girls Clubs of America and the Reviving Baseball in Inner Cities from 1996 to 2001. In 2005, Ramirez became the head baseball coach of the La Salle Academy in New York City. Ramirez was appointed the head coach of the Globe Institute of Technology in 2006. In the fall of 2007, Ramirez joined the Monroe College staff where he would remain an assistant until 2012.

On September 9, 2016, Ramirez was named the head coach of the Saint Peter's Peacocks baseball program. Ramirez's first team at Saint Peter's went 0–38. Saint Peter's would go on to lose their first 77 games under Ramirez before finally winning 7–1 over Iona. On May 23, 2019, Ramirez resigned as head coach at Saint Peter's. He compiled a 7–126 record over three seasons.

== Head coaching record ==
Statistics overview
Season	Team	Overall	Conference	Standing	Postseason
Saint Peter's Peacocks (Metro Atlantic Athletic Conference) (2017–2019)
2017	Saint Peter's	0–38	0–24	11th	
2018	Saint Peter's	2–42	2–22	11th	
2019	Saint Peter's	5–46	3–21	11th	
Saint Peter's:		7–126	5–67		
Total:		7–126			
National champion Postseason invitational champion Conference regular season champion Conference regular season and conference tournament champion Division regular season champion Division regular season and conference tournament champion Conference tournament champion
