= 2019 Atlantic 10 Conference baseball tournament =

American college baseball tournament

- Teams: 7
- Format: Double-elimination
- Finals site: Houlihan Park; The Bronx
- Champions: Fordham (2nd title)
- Winning coach: Kevin Leighton (1st title)
- MVP: Nick Labella ()
- Television: ESPN+

2019 Atlantic 10 Conference baseball standings
| | Conf. | | | | | | Overall |
| Team | W | | L | | T | PCT | W | | L | | T | PCT |
|---|---|---|---|---|---|---|---|---|---|---|---|---|
| VCU ‍†‍‍ | 19 | – | 5 | – | 0 | .792 | 39 | – | 19 | – | 0 | .672 |
| Davidson ‍‍‍ | 14 | – | 6 | – | 0 | .700 | 29 | – | 22 | – | 0 | .569 |
| Dayton ‍‍‍ | 16 | – | 8 | – | 0 | .667 | 32 | – | 26 | – | 1 | .551 |
| Fordham ‍‍‡‍^{y} | 15 | – | 9 | – | 0 | .625 | 38 | – | 24 | – | 0 | .613 |
| Richmond ‍‍‍ | 13 | – | 8 | – | 0 | .619 | 28 | – | 25 | – | 1 | .528 |
| Rhode Island ‍‍‍ | 14 | – | 9 | – | 0 | .609 | 24 | – | 29 | – | 0 | .453 |
| Saint Louis ‍‍‍ | 13 | – | 11 | – | 0 | .542 | 25 | – | 30 | – | 0 | .455 |
| Saint Joseph's ‍‍‍ | 13 | – | 11 | – | 0 | .542 | 21 | – | 28 | – | 0 | .429 |
| George Washington ‍‍‍ | 11 | – | 13 | – | 0 | .458 | 30 | – | 24 | – | 0 | .556 |
| UMass ‍‍‍ | 8 | – | 14 | – | 0 | .364 | 18 | – | 27 | – | 0 | .400 |
| St. Bonaventure ‍‍‍ | 6 | – | 18 | – | 0 | .250 | 13 | – | 32 | – | 0 | .289 |
| George Mason ‍‍‍ | 5 | – | 19 | – | 0 | .208 | 19 | – | 35 | – | 0 | .352 |
| La Salle ‍‍‍ | 4 | – | 20 | – | 0 | .167 | 25 | – | 31 | – | 0 | .446 |
† – Conference champion ‡ – Tournament champion y – Invited to the NCAA tournament As of June 4, 2019; Rankings from D1Baseball

The 2019 Atlantic 10 Conference baseball tournament took place from May 22 to 25. The top seven regular season finishers of the league's twelve teams met in the double-elimination tournament held at Jim Houlihan Park at Jack Coffey Field, the home field of Fordham in The Bronx. The winner, Fordham, earned the conference's automatic bid to the 2019 NCAA Division I baseball tournament.

== Seeding and format ==
The tournament used the same format adopted in 2014, with the top seven finishers from the regular season seeded one through seven. The top seed received a single bye while remaining seeds played on the first day.

== Results ==
Upper round 1 | Upper round 2 | Upper final | Final
1 | VCU | 1
4 | Fordham | 2
4 | Fordham | 7
5 | Richmond | 6^{10}
4 | Fordham | 4
3 | Dayton | 2
3 | Dayton | 5
6 | Rhode Island | 2
3 | Dayton | 7
2 | Davidson | 3
2 | Davidson | 2
7 | Saint Louis | 0
4 | Fordham | 4 | –
3 | Dayton | 3^{12} | –
Lower round 1 | Lower round 2 | Lower round 3 | Lower final
6 | Rhode Island | 2
6 | Rhode Island | 2 | 2 | Davidson | 4 | 2 | Davidson | 2
7 | Saint Louis | 1^{10} | 2 | Davidson | 6 | 3 | Dayton | 5
5 | Richmond | 3
5 | Richmond | 6
1 | VCU | 2

== Conference championship ==
Atlantic 10 Championship
| (3) Dayton Flyers | vs. | (4) Fordham Rams |

May 25, 2019, 12:00 pm (EDT) at Houlihan Park in The Bronx, New York, 66 °F (19 °C), mostly sunny
| Team | 1 | 2 | 3 | 4 | 5 | 6 | 7 | 8 | 9 | 10 | 11 | 12 | R | H | E |
|---|---|---|---|---|---|---|---|---|---|---|---|---|---|---|---|
| (3) Dayton | 0 | 0 | 0 | 0 | 0 | 0 | 2 | 0 | 1 | 0 | 0 | 0 | 3 | 9 | 2 |
| (4) Fordham | 1 | 0 | 0 | 0 | 1 | 1 | 0 | 0 | 0 | 0 | 0 | 1 | 4 | 8 | 1 |
WP: Cory Wall (2–1) LP: Cole Pletka (4–3) Sv: None; Home runs: DAY: Alex Brickman (7); FORD: None
