= 2019 Southern Conference baseball tournament =

- Teams: 9
- Format: two bracket Double-elimination tournament with championship game
- Finals site: Fluor Field at the West End; Greenville, SC
- Champions: Mercer Bears (2nd title)
- Winning coach: Craig Gibson
- MVP: Trevor Austin (Mercer)
- Television: SoCon DN; ESPN+ (Championship)

2019 Southern Conference baseball standings
	Conf.				Overall
Team	W		L	PCT	W		L	PCT
Samford ‍†‍‍	19	–	5	.792	41	–	19	.683
Wofford ‍‍‍	14	–	9	.609	36	–	25	.590
UNC Greensboro ‍‍‍	14	–	10	.583	34	–	20	.630
Mercer ‍‍‡‍^{y}	14	–	10	.583	35	–	29	.547
Furman ‍‍‍	13	–	11	.542	26	–	31	.456
East Tennessee State ‍‍‍	11	–	12	.478	34	–	21	.618
VMI ‍‍‍	9	–	15	.375	17	–	41	.293
Western Carolina ‍‍‍	8	–	16	.333	21	–	32	.396
The Citadel ‍‍‍	5	–	19	.208	12	–	43	.218
† – Conference champion ‡ – Tournament champion y – Invited to the NCAA tournament As of June 5, 2019; Rankings from D1Baseball

The 2019 Southern Conference baseball tournament was held from May 21 through 26 at Fluor Field at the West End in Greenville, South Carolina. The annual event determined the conference champion of the Division I Southern Conference in college baseball. The tournament winner, Mercer Bears, earned the league's bid to the 2019 NCAA Division I baseball tournament. This was the last of 20 athletic championships held by the conference in the 2018–19 academic year.

The tournament was originally held from 1950–53, when the Southern Conference was a large conference composed of several small schools and several large schools, the latter of which would form the Atlantic Coast Conference after the 1953 season. The event was re-established in 1984 and has been held every year since. Western Carolina has claimed ten championships, the most of any school, with The Citadel close behind at eight tournament wins. Furman and defending champion Samford are the only other current schools with multiple championships, having each won two. East Tennessee State and VMI have never won a title, although they both returned to the conference in 2015 after over ten years in other conferences. Mercer claimed the conference championship in its first ever appearance in 2015.

The tournament was played in Greenville, which has hosted six of the past ten events.

== Seeding and format ==
All nine teams participated in the tournament, with the bottom two seeds playing a single-elimination play-in round. The remaining teams then played a double-elimination tournament.

== Bracket ==
=== Play-In Round ===
Tuesday, May 21
Team	R
#9 The Citadel	3
#8 Western Carolina	7

=== Double-elimination round ===
Upper round 1	Upper round 2	Upper final	Final
1	Samford	5
8	Western Carolina	4^{10}
1	Samford	11
4	Mercer	0
4	Mercer	11
5	Furman	2
1	Samford	2
2	Wofford	5
2	Wofford	12
7	VMI	7
2	Wofford	2
6	East Tennessee State	1
3	UNC Greensboro	2
6	East Tennessee State	4	2	Wofford	8	5
4	Mercer	12	9
Lower round 1	Lower round 2	Lower round 3	Lower final
5	Furman	5
8	Western Carolina	7	6	East Tennessee State	7	4	Mercer	4
5	Furman	9	6	East Tennessee State	7	1	Samford	3
4	Mercer	11
3	UNC Greensboro	5
7	VMI	2	4	Mercer	9
3	UNC Greensboro	4

== Conference championship ==
Southern Conference Championship
(2) Wofford Terriers	vs.	(4) Mercer Bears

May 26, 2019, 12:00 p.m. (EDT) at Fluor Field at the West End in Greenville, South Carolina
Team	1	2	3	4	5	6	7	8	9	R	H	E
(4) Mercer	3	1	4	0	0	2	2	0	0	12	14	2
(2) Wofford	2	0	0	1	0	0	4	1	0	8	14	3
WP: Sawyer Gipson-Long (8–3) LP: Austin Higginbotham (9–4); Home runs: MER: None; WOFF: Andrew Orzel; Attendance: 1,094

May 26, 2019, 4:40 p.m. (EDT) at Fluor Field at the West End in Greenville, South Carolina
Team	1	2	3	4	5	6	7	8	9	R	H	E
(2) Wofford	1	0	0	0	1	3	0	0	0	5	10	3
(4) Mercer	0	3	1	2	0	0	0	3	X	9	12	0
WP: Taylor Lobus (2–0) LP: Jake Hershman (2–3) Sv: Tanner Hall (1); Home runs: WOFF: Brett Rodriguez; MER: None; Attendance: 774
