= 2019 ASUN Conference baseball tournament =

American college baseball tournament

- Teams: 6
- Format: Double-elimination
- Finals site: Melching Field at Conrad Park; DeLand, Florida
- Champions: Liberty (1st title)
- Winning coach: Scott Jackson (1st title)
- Television: ESPN+

2019 ASUN Conference baseball standings
	Conf.						Overall
Team	W		L		T	PCT	W		L		T	PCT
Florida Gulf Coast ‍†‍‍	16	–	7	–	0	.696	34	–	21	–	0	.618
Liberty ‍‍‡‍^{y}	15	–	9	–	0	.625	43	–	21	–	0	.672
Lipscomb ‍‍‍	14	–	10	–	0	.583	30	–	25	–	0	.545
Jacksonville ‍‍‍	13	–	11	–	0	.542	32	–	27	–	0	.542
North Florida ‍‍‍	12	–	11	–	0	.522	32	–	25	–	0	.561
Stetson ‍‍‍	11	–	12	–	0	.478	27	–	32	–	0	.458
Kennesaw State ‍‍‍	11	–	13	–	0	.458	27	–	29	–	0	.482
North Alabama ‍‍‍	7	–	16	–	0	.304	16	–	38	–	0	.296
NJIT ‍‍‍	7	–	17	–	0	.292	17	–	27	–	1	.389
† – Conference champion ‡ – Tournament champion y – Invited to the NCAA tournament As of June 4, 2019; Rankings from D1Baseball

The 2019 ASUN Conference baseball tournament was held at Melching Field at Conrad Park, home field of the Stetson Hatters baseball team in DeLand, Florida, from May 22 through 25. The winner of the tournament, Liberty, claimed the ASUN Conference's automatic bid to the 2019 NCAA Division I baseball tournament.

== Format and seeding ==
The 2019 tournament was a double-elimination tournament in which the top six conference members participated. Seeds were determined based on conference winning percentage from the round-robin regular season.

== Bracket and results ==
First round
1	Florida Gulf Coast	5
6	Stetson	7
2	Liberty	6
5	North Florida	4
3	Lipscomb	11^{10}
4	Jacksonville	12

Second round
6	Stetson	6
3	Lipscomb	5^{12}
2	Liberty	6^{10}
4	Jacksonville	9
1	Florida Gulf Coast	5
5	North Florida	10

Third round
6	Stetson	6
4	Jacksonville	1^{16}
2	Liberty	3
5	North Florida	2^{12}

Semifinals
2	Liberty	5
4	Jacksonville	2

Final
6	Stetson	3	3
2	Liberty	6	4

== Conference championship ==
Atlantic Sun Championship
(2) Liberty Flames	vs.	(6) Stetson Hatters

May 25, 2019, 3:00 p.m. (EDT) at Melching Field at Conrad Park in DeLand, Florida
Team	1	2	3	4	5	6	7	8	9	R	H	E
(2) Liberty	0	0	2	0	0	4	0	0	0	6	9	1
(6) Stetson	0	0	0	0	1	0	0	2	0	3	7	1
WP: Logan Barker (2–0) LP: Daniel Paret (5–4) Sv: Cole Garrett (1); Home runs: LIB: None; STET: Eric Foggo

May 26, 2019, 1:00 p.m. (EDT) at Melching Field at Conrad Park in DeLand, Florida
Team	1	2	3	4	5	6	7	8	9	R	H	E
(6) Stetson	0	0	0	0	0	0	3	0	0	3	9	0
(2) Liberty	0	4	0	0	0	0	0	0	0	4	6	2
WP: Andrew McInvale (10–2) LP: Vlad Nunez (3–3); Attendance: 421
