= 2019 Colonial Athletic Association baseball tournament =

American college baseball tournament

- Teams: 6
- Format: Modified Double-elimination tournament
- Finals site: Eagle Field at Veterans Memorial Park; Harrisonburg, Virginia
- Champions: UNC Wilmington (6th title)
- Winning coach: Mark Scalf (6th title)
- MVP: Greg Jones (UNC Wilmington)

2019 Colonial Athletic Association baseball standings
	Conf.						Overall
Team	W		L		T	PCT	W		L		T	PCT
Elon ‍†‍‍	19	–	5	–	0	.792	33	–	24	–	0	.579
College of Charleston ‍‍‍	16	–	8	–	0	.667	36	–	21	–	0	.632
William & Mary ‍‍‍	12	–	12	–	0	.500	33	–	22	–	0	.600
Northeastern ‍‍‍	12	–	12	–	0	.500	28	–	29	–	0	.491
UNC Wilmington ‍‍‡‍^{y}	12	–	12	–	0	.500	32	–	31	–	0	.508
James Madison ‍‍‍	11	–	13	–	0	.458	31	–	26	–	0	.544
Hofstra ‍‍‍	10	–	14	–	0	.417	18	–	31	–	1	.370
Delaware ‍‍‍	9	–	15	–	0	.375	21	–	33	–	0	.389
Towson ‍‍‍	7	–	17	–	0	.292	14	–	39	–	0	.264
† – Conference champion ‡ – Tournament champion y – Invited to the NCAA tournament As of June 30, 2019; Rankings from D1Baseball

The 2019 Colonial Athletic Association baseball tournament was held at Eagle Field at Veterans Memorial Park in Harrisonburg, Virginia, from May 22 through 25. The winner of the tournament, UNC Wilmington, earned the Colonial Athletic Association's automatic bid to the 2019 NCAA Division I baseball tournament.

Entering the event, defending champion UNC Wilmington had won the most championships among active teams, with five. James Madison and William & Mary had claimed two titles, while College of Charleston, Delaware, and Towson each had one. Former member East Carolina won 7 titles during their tenure in the conference.

== Seeding and format ==
Continuing the format adopted in 2012, the top six finishers from the regular season competed in the modified double-elimination tournament.

Team	W	L	Pct.	GB	Seed
Elon	19	5	.792	—	1
College of Charleston	16	8	.667	3	2
William & Mary	12	12	.500	7	3
Northeastern	12	12	.500	7	4
UNC Wilmington	12	12	.500	7	5
James Madison	11	13	.458	8	6
Hofstra	10	14	.417	9	—
Delaware	9	15	.375	10	—
Towson	7	17	.292	12	—

== Bracket ==
Upper round 1	Upper round 2	Upper final	Final
1	Elon	3
4	Northeastern	6	5	UNC Wilmington	8
5	UNC Wilmington	8^{11}	5	UNC Wilmington	5
3	William & Mary	1
2	College of Charleston	0
3	William & Mary	2	3	William & Mary	1^{14}
6	James Madison	1
5	UNC Wilmington	1	6^{10}
1	Elon	4	5
Lower round 1	Lower round 2	Lower round 3	Lower final
1	Elon	9
1	Elon	8	3	William & Mary	2
2	College of Charleston	7	4	Northeastern	6
4	Northeastern	9	4	Northeastern	8
6	James Madison	7

== Conference championship ==
Colonial Athletic Association Championship
(5) UNC Wilmington Seahawks	vs.	(1) Elon Phoenix

May 25, 2019, 6:00 p.m. (EDT) at Eagle Field at Veterans Memorial Park in Harrisonburg, Virginia
Team	1	2	3	4	5	6	7	8	9	R	H	E
(1) Elon	0	2	1	0	0	0	1	0	0	4	5	3
(5) UNC Wilmington	0	0	0	0	0	1	0	0	0	1	4	0
WP: Dean McCarthy (2–3) LP: Gage Herring (0–6) Sv: Brandon Justice (2); Home runs: ELON: Ty Adcock (12); Adam Spurlin (7); UNCW: None; Attendance: 486

May 26, 2019, 11:00 a.m. (EDT) at Eagle Field at Veterans Memorial Park in Harrisonburg, Virginia
Team	1	2	3	4	5	6	7	8	9	10	R	H	E
(5) UNC Wilmington	0	0	0	2	1	1	0	0	1	1	6	11	0
(1) Elon	0	0	0	0	0	3	0	0	2	0	5	10	2
WP: Henry Ryan (4–4) LP: Joe Sprake (0–1); Attendance: 276

== All-Tournament Team ==
The following players were named to the All-Tournament Team.

Name	School
Ty Adcock	Elon
Cam Devanney	Elon
Ian Fair	Northeastern
Jake Farrell	Northeastern
Greg Jones	UNC Wilmington
Dean Mc‑Carthy	Elon
Griffin McLarty	College of Charleston
Matt Oldham	Elon
Landon Roupp	UNC Wilmington
Zarion Sharpe	Elon
Bodie Sheehan	William & Mary
Cole Weiss	UNC Wilmington

=== Most Valuable Player ===
Greg Jones was named Tournament Most Valuable Player. Weiss was a shortstop for UNC Wilmington.
