= 2019 Ivy League Baseball Championship Series =

2019 Ivy League baseball tournament
- Teams: 2
- Format: Best of three series
- Finals site: Joseph J. O'Donnell Field; Boston, Massachusetts
- Champions: Harvard (5th title)
- Winning coach: Bill Decker (1st title)
- Television: Ivy League DN

2019 Ivy League baseball standings
	Conf.				Overall
Team	W		L	PCT	W		L	PCT
Harvard ‍†‍‡‍^{y}	14	–	7	.667	27	–	16	.628
Columbia ‍‍‍	13	–	8	.619	19	–	23	.452
Yale ‍‍‍	12	–	8	.600	18	–	23	.439
Penn ‍‍‍	11	–	10	.524	23	–	18	.561
Brown ‍‍‍	9	–	12	.429	12	–	27	.308
Princeton ‍‍‍	8	–	12	.400	14	–	26	.350
Cornell ‍‍‍	8	–	13	.381	14	–	24	.368
Dartmouth ‍‍‍	8	–	13	.381	15	–	26	.366
† – Conference champion ‡ – Championship Series champion y – Invited to the NCAA tournament As of June 4, 2019; Rankings from D1Baseball

The 2019 Ivy League Baseball Championship Series was held at Joseph J. O'Donnell Field from May 18 to May 19, 2019. The series matched the top two teams from the Ivy League's round robin regular season, Harvard and Columbia. Harvard swept the series and claimed the Ivy League's automatic berth in the 2019 NCAA Division I baseball tournament. As it turned out, this was the last Ivy League Baseball Championship Series for two years, as the Ivy League cancelled the Series for 2020 and 2021 due to the COVID-19 pandemic.

== Results ==
Game One

May 18, 2019 1:10 pm
Team	1	2	3	4	5	6	7	8	9	R	H	E
Columbia	0	0	0	0	0	0	0	0	1	1	4	2
Harvard	0	0	0	0	0	0	1	2	X	3	5	1
WP: Bigge (7–1) LP: Simpson (4–3); Home runs: Columbia: None; Harvard: Bigge; Boxscore

Game Two

May 19, 2019 3:02 pm
Team	1	2	3	4	5	6	7	8	9	10	11	R	H	E
Harvard	0	0	0	0	0	4	1	1	0	0	2	8	12	1
Columbia	3	0	0	1	0	0	0	2	0	0	0	6	11	2
WP: Hall (3–0) LP: Stiegler (0–3); Home runs: Harvard: McColl; Columbia: None; Notes: Harvard wins Ivy League Series; Boxscore
