= 2019 Horizon League baseball tournament =

- Teams: 6
- Format: Double-elimination
- Champions: UIC (6th title)
- Winning coach: Mike Dee (5th title)
- MVP: Ryan Hampe (UIC)
- Television: ESPN+

2019 Horizon League baseball standings
	Conf.						Overall
Team	W		L		T	PCT	W		L		T	PCT
Wright State ‍†‍‍	22	–	8	–	0	.733	42	–	17	–	0	.712
Milwaukee ‍‍‍	18	–	11	–	0	.621	35	–	21	–	1	.623
UIC ‍‍‡‍^{y}	18	–	11	–	0	.621	29	–	23	–	0	.558
Northern Kentucky ‍‍‍	12	–	18	–	0	.400	15	–	42	–	0	.263
Oakland ‍‍‍	9	–	18	–	0	.333	11	–	37	–	0	.229
Youngstown State ‍‍‍	7	–	20	–	0	.259	13	–	41	–	0	.241
† – Conference champion ‡ – Tournament champion y – Invited to the NCAA tournament As of June 4, 2019; Rankings from D1Baseball

The 2019 Horizon League baseball tournament was held from May 22 through 25. All six of the league's teams met in the double-elimination tournament held at the home field of the regular season champion. The winner of the tournament, UIC, earned the conference's automatic bid to the 2019 NCAA Division I baseball tournament.

== Seeding and format ==
The league's teams were seeded one through six based on winning percentage, using conference games only. The bottom four seeds participated in a play-in round, with winners advancing to a double-elimination tournament also including the top two seeds.

== Bracket ==
=== Play-In Round ===
Team	R
#6 Youngstown State	3
#3 Milwaukee	12

Team	R
#5 Oakland	8
#4 Northern Kentucky	9

=== Double-Elimination Rounds ===
First round
1	Wright State	15
4	Northern Kentucky	3
2	UIC	18
3	Milwaukee	10
Lower round 1
4	Northern Kentucky	1
3	Milwaukee	9

Semi-finals
1	Wright State	6^{10}
2	UIC	11
Lower final
1	Wright State	9
3	Milwaukee	10

Finals
2	UIC
3	Milwaukee

== Conference championship ==
Horizon League Championship
(3) Milwaukee Panthers	vs.	(2) UIC Flames

May 25, 2019, 12:00 p.m. (EDT) at Nischwitz Stadium in Fairborn, Ohio
Team	1	2	3	4	5	6	7	8	9	R	H	E
(3) Milwaukee	0	1	0	2	0	2	0	0	0	5	10	2
(2) UIC	0	0	0	2	3	0	1	0	X	6	7	0
WP: Nick Oliff (1–0) LP: Jared Reklaitis (9–5) Sv: Alex Padilla (7); Attendance: 174
