= 2019 Metro Atlantic Athletic Conference baseball tournament =

- Teams: 6
- Format: Double-elimination
- Finals site: Richmond County Bank Ballpark; Staten Island
- Champions: Quinnipiac (1st title)
- Television: ESPN+

2019 Metro Atlantic Athletic Conference baseball standings
| | Conf. | | | | | | Overall |
| Team | W | | L | | T | PCT | W | | L | | T | PCT |
|---|---|---|---|---|---|---|---|---|---|---|---|---|
| Canisius ‍†‍‍ | 17 | – | 7 | – | 0 | .708 | 24 | – | 29 | – | 0 | .453 |
| Quinnipiac ‍†‍‡‍^{y} | 17 | – | 7 | – | 0 | .708 | 30 | – | 29 | – | 0 | .508 |
| Fairfield ‍‍‍ | 15 | – | 9 | – | 0 | .625 | 35 | – | 25 | – | 0 | .583 |
| Marist ‍‍‍ | 15 | – | 9 | – | 0 | .625 | 27 | – | 26 | – | 0 | .509 |
| Manhattan ‍‍‍ | 15 | – | 9 | – | 0 | .625 | 26 | – | 33 | – | 0 | .441 |
| Monmouth ‍‍‍ | 13 | – | 11 | – | 0 | .542 | 27 | – | 29 | – | 1 | .482 |
| Siena ‍‍‍ | 12 | – | 12 | – | 0 | .500 | 18 | – | 33 | – | 0 | .353 |
| Niagara ‍‍‍ | 9 | – | 15 | – | 0 | .375 | 15 | – | 33 | – | 0 | .313 |
| Rider ‍‍‍ | 8 | – | 16 | – | 0 | .333 | 17 | – | 36 | – | 0 | .321 |
| Iona ‍‍‍ | 8 | – | 16 | – | 0 | .333 | 14 | – | 38 | – | 0 | .269 |
| Saint Peter's ‍‍‍ | 3 | – | 21 | – | 0 | .125 | 5 | – | 46 | – | 0 | .098 |
† – Conference champion ‡ – Tournament champion y – Invited to the NCAA tournament As of June 4, 2019; Rankings from D1Baseball

The 2019 Metro Atlantic Athletic Conference baseball tournament was held from May 22 through 25. The top six regular season finishers of the league's eleven teams met in the double-elimination tournament to be held at Richmond County Bank Ballpark in Staten Island, New York. The tournament champion, Quinnipiac, earned the conference's automatic bid to the 2019 NCAA Division I baseball tournament.

== Seeding ==
The top six teams were seeded one through four based on their conference winning percentage. They then played a double-elimination tournament.

== Results ==
Upper round 1 | Upper round 2 | Upper final | Final
1 | Canisius | 3
3 | Fairfield | 6 | 5 | Manhattan | 5
6 | Monmouth | 5 | 5 | Manhattan | 6
2 | Quinnipiac | 11
2 | Quinnipiac | 6
4 | Marist | 2 | 3 | Fairfield | 4
5 | Manhattan | 6
2 | Quinnipiac | 6 | –
3 | Fairfield | 5^{13} | –
Lower round 1 | Lower round 2 | Lower round 3 | Lower final
3 | Fairfield | 11
3 | Fairfield | 5 | 5 | Manhattan | 5
3 | Fairfield | 5 | 1 | Canisius | 0
6 | Monmouth | 13 | 6 | Monmouth | 2^{10}
4 | Marist | 11^{10}

== Conference championship ==
MAAC Championship
| (3) Fairfield Stags | vs. | (2) Quinnipiac Bobcats |

May 26, 2019, 12:00 p.m. (EDT) at Richmond County Bank Ballpark in Staten Island, New York
| Team | 1 | 2 | 3 | 4 | 5 | 6 | 7 | 8 | 9 | 10 | 11 | 12 | 13 | R | H | E |
|---|---|---|---|---|---|---|---|---|---|---|---|---|---|---|---|---|
| (3) Fairfield | 0 | 1 | 0 | 0 | 3 | 1 | 0 | 0 | 0 | 0 | 0 | 0 | 0 | 5 | 11 | 0 |
| (2) Quinnipiac | 1 | 2 | 0 | 0 | 2 | 0 | 0 | 0 | 0 | 0 | 0 | 0 | 1 | 6 | 13 | 3 |
WP: Colin Donnelly (5–1) LP: Nick Grabek (3–2); Home runs: FFD: None; QUIN: Brian Moskey (4); Ian Ostberg (3)
