= 2019 Northeast Conference baseball tournament =

- Teams: 4
- Format: Double-elimination tournament
- Finals site: Senator Thomas J. Dodd Memorial Stadium; Norwich, CT
- Champions: Central Connecticut (6th title)
- Winning coach: Charlie Hickey (6th title)
- Television: NEC Front Row

2019 Northeast Conference baseball standings
	Conf.						Overall
Team	W		L		T	PCT	W		L		T	PCT
Bryant ‍†‍‍	19	–	5	–	0	.792	40	–	20	–	0	.667
Central Connecticut ‍‍‡‍^{y}	16	–	8	–	0	.667	31	–	23	–	0	.574
Wagner ‍‍‍	11	–	13	–	0	.458	19	–	32	–	0	.373
Sacred Heart ‍‍‍	11	–	13	–	0	.458	19	–	34	–	1	.361
LIU Brooklyn ‍‍‍	10	–	14	–	0	.417	20	–	33	–	0	.377
Fairleigh Dickinson ‍‍‍	9	–	15	–	0	.375	15	–	37	–	1	.292
Mount St. Mary's ‍‍‍	8	–	16	–	0	.333	15	–	35	–	0	.300
† – Conference champion ‡ – Tournament champion y – Invited to the NCAA tournament As of June 4, 2019; Rankings from D1Baseball

The 2019 Northeast Conference baseball tournament began on May 23 and end on May 26 at Senator Thomas J. Dodd Memorial Stadium in Norwich, Connecticut. The league's top four finishers competed in the double elimination tournament. The tournament winner, Central Connecticut, earned the Northeast Conference's automatic bid to the 2019 NCAA Division I baseball tournament. Central Connecticut has won the most tournament championships among current members, while Fairleigh Dickinson has never won a championship. LIU Brooklyn won their first title in 2018.

== Seeding and format ==
The top four finishers were seeded one through four based on conference regular season winning percentage. They then played a double-elimination tournament.

== Bracket ==
First round
1	Bryant	4
4	Sacred Heart	0
2	Central Connecticut	5
3	Wagner	0
Lower round 1
4	Sacred Heart	7
3	Wagner	11

Semi-finals
1	Bryant	3
2	Central Connecticut	1
Lower final
3	Wagner	3
2	Central Connecticut	7

Finals
1	Bryant	1	2
2	Central Connecticut	3	3

== Conference championship ==
Northeast Conference Championship
(1) Bryant Bulldogs	vs.	(2) Central Connecticut Blue Devils

May 25, 2019, 4:15 p.m. (EDT) at Senator Thomas J. Dodd Memorial Stadium in Norwich, Connecticut
Team	1	2	3	4	5	6	7	8	9	R	H	E
(1) Bryant	0	1	0	0	0	0	0	0	0	1	9	2
(2) Central Connecticut	0	1	2	0	0	0	0	0	X	3	7	2
WP: Mike Appel (6–0) LP: Nathan Wrighter (4–2) Sv: Jared Gallagher (9); Home runs: BRY: None; CCSU: TT Bowens (4)

May 26, 2019, 12:00 p.m. (EDT) at Senator Thomas J. Dodd Memorial Stadium in Norwich, Connecticut
Team	1	2	3	4	5	6	7	8	9	R	H	E
(1) Bryant	0	0	0	0	0	2	0	0	0	2	10	1
(2) Central Connecticut	0	0	0	0	1	0	1	1	X	3	5	1
WP: Jared Gallagher (3–0) LP: Jackson Harrigan (1–2); Home runs: BRY: None; CCSU: Dave Matthews
