= 2019 Mid-American Conference baseball tournament =

American collegiate baseball tournament

- Teams: 6
- Format: Double-elimination
- Finals site: Sprenger Stadium; Avon, Ohio
- Champions: Central Michigan (3rd title)
- Winning coach: Jordan Bischel (1st title)
- MVP: Griffin Lockwood-Powell ((Central Michigan))
- Television: ESPN+

2019 Mid-American Conference baseball standings
	Conf.						Overall
Team	W		L		T	PCT	W		L		T	PCT
Central Michigan ‍†‍‡‍^{y}	22	–	5	–	0	.815	47	–	14	–	0	.770
Ball State ‍‍‍	20	–	5	–	0	.800	38	–	19	–	0	.667
Kent State ‍‍‍	17	–	8	–	0	.680	30	–	24	–	0	.556
Miami (OH) ‍‍‍	15	–	11	–	0	.577	37	–	19	–	0	.661
Northern Illinois ‍‍‍	14	–	12	–	0	.538	20	–	36	–	0	.357
Ohio ‍‍‍	12	–	14	–	0	.462	20	–	34	–	0	.370
Western Michigan ‍‍‍	11	–	14	–	0	.440	18	–	31	–	0	.367
Bowling Green ‍‍‍	8	–	18	–	0	.308	16	–	33	–	0	.327
Eastern Michigan ‍‍‍	6	–	21	–	0	.222	11	–	43	–	1	.209
Toledo ‍‍‍	4	–	21	–	0	.160	17	–	36	–	0	.321
† – Conference champion ‡ – Tournament champion y – Invited to the NCAA tournament As of June 4, 2019; Rankings from D1Baseball

The 2019 Mid-American Conference baseball tournament was held from May 22 through 26. The top six regular season finishers of the league's ten teams met in the double-elimination tournament held at Sprenger Stadium in Avon, Ohio. The winner of the tournament, Central Michigan, earned the conference's automatic bid to the 2019 NCAA Division I baseball tournament.

== Seeding and format ==
The top six teams were seeded according conference winning percentage. Teams then played a double-elimination tournament with the top two seeds each receiving a single bye.

== Results ==
Upper round 1	Upper round 2	Upper final	Final
1	Central Michigan	18
3	Kent State	3	6	Ohio	9
6	Ohio	7	1	Central Michigan	8
2	Ball State	2
2	Ball State	10
4	Miami (OH)	0	5	Northern Illinois	4
5	Northern Illinois	4
1	Central Michigan	6	–
2	Ball State	0	–
Lower round 1	Lower round 2	Lower round 3	Lower final
5	Northern Illinois	7^{11}
6	Ohio	3	2	Ball State	8
4	Miami (OH)	5^{17}	5	Northern Illinois	6
3	Kent State	5	6	Ohio	6
4	Miami (OH)	8

== Conference championship ==
MAC Championship
(2) Ball State Cardinals	vs.	(1) Central Michigan Chippewas

May 26, 2019, 6:00 p.m. (EDT) at Sprenger Stadium in Avon, Ohio
Team	1	2	3	4	5	6	7	8	9	R	H	E
(2) Ball State	0	0	0	0	0	0	0	0	0	0	4	2
(1) Central Michigan	2	0	0	1	0	1	2	0	X	6	7	2
WP: Jordan Patty (4–2) LP: Mike Pachmayer (4–2); Home runs: BALL: None; CMU: Griffin Lockwood-Powell (12); Attendance: 1,054
