= Lou Proietti =

American baseball coach and shortstop (born 1983)

Biographical details
- Born: May 27, 1983 (age 42); Hamilton, Ontario

Playing career
- 2004: Saint Peter's
- 2005: Potomac State College
- 2006–2007: UMass
- Position: Shortstop

Coaching career (HC unless noted)
- 2008–2009: Cardinal Newman
- 2010: McMaster University (asst)
- 2013–2015: Rider (asst)
- 2016–2019: Stonehill (H/IF/RC)
- 2020–2022: Saint Peter's

Head coaching record
- Overall: 14–79
- Tournaments: NCAA: 0–0

Louis Anthony Proietti (born May 27, 1983) is an American baseball coach and former shortstop. Proietti played college baseball at Saint Peter's in 2004, Potomac State College of West Virginia University in 2005 and at University of Massachusetts Amherst from 2006 to 2007 for coach Mike Stone. He then served as the head coach of the Saint Peter's Peacocks (2020–2022).

Proietti was born in Hamilton, Ontario. He attended Berkshire Preparatory School in Sheffield, Massachusetts. After graduation from high school, he decided to attend Saint Peter's University to play baseball. After his freshman year, he left Saint Peter's to play junior college baseball for Potomac State College in West Virginia. After his sophomore year, he committed to play for UMass. He concluded his career after the 2007 season.

In 2019, Proietti was named the head coach of the Saint Peter's Peacocks baseball program. Proietti stepped away from the Peacocks following the 2022 season.

Statistics overview
Season	Team	Overall	Conference	Standing	Postseason
Saint Peter's Peacocks (Metro Atlantic Athletic Conference) (2020–2022)
2020	Saint Peter's	1–14	0–0		Season canceled due to COVID-19
2021	Saint Peter's	4–24	4–24	10th	
2022	Saint Peter's	9–41	6–17	10th	
Saint Peter's:		14–79	20–41		
Total:		14–79			
National champion Postseason invitational champion Conference regular season champion Conference regular season and conference tournament champion Division regular season champion Division regular season and conference tournament champion Conference tournament champion
