= Nevada Wolf Pack baseball =

- 2026 Nevada Wolf Pack baseball team
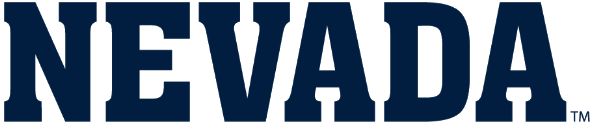
- Founded: 1957; 68 years ago
- University: University of Nevada, Reno
- Head coach: Jordan Getzelman (1st season)
- Conference: Mountain West
- Location: Reno, Nevada
- Home stadium: William Peccole Park (Capacity: 3,000)
- Nickname: Wolf Pack
- Colors: Navy blue and silver

NCAA tournament appearances
- 1994, 1997, 1999, 2000, 2021

Conference regular season champions
- 1994, 2000, 2012, 2015, 2018, 2021, 2025

The Nevada Wolf Pack baseball team is a varsity intercollegiate athletic team of the University of Nevada, Reno in Reno, Nevada, United States. The team is a member of the Mountain West Conference, which is part of the NCAA Division I. Nevada's first baseball team was fielded in 1957. The team plays its home games at William Peccole Park in Reno, Nevada. The Wolf Pack are coached by Jordan Getzelman.

In 2015, future major league baseball outfielder Cal Stevenson, playing for the Wolf Pack, was named the Mountain West Co-Freshman of the Year, and a Freshman All-American by Louisville Slugger and Baseball America.

== Nevada in the NCAA tournament ==
Year	Record	Pct	Notes	Results
1994	1–2	.333	Central Regional	UTSA, W 11-8; Texas, L 16-6; Arkansas State, L 4-2
1997	1–2	.333	Central Regional	Clemson, L 13-9; Texas State, W 7-1; Missouri State, L 10-9
1999	2–2	.500	Stanford Regional	North Carolina, L 8-5; Loyola Marymount, W 4-3; North Carolina, W 5-1; Stanford L, 7-4
2000	1–2	.333	Palo Alto Regional	Alabama, L 8-2; Fresno State, W 13-5; Alabama, L 6-5
2021	0–2	.000	Stanford Regional	UC Irvine, L 7-0; North Dakota State, L 6-1
TOTALS	5-10	.333		

== Notable players ==
- Shawn Barton
- Eddie Bonine
- Ryan Church
- Chris Dickerson
- Andy Dominique
- T. J. Friedl
- Chris Gimenez
- Brett Hayes
- Derek Hines
- Joe Inglett
- Bill Ireland
- Kevin Kouzmanoff
- Corky Miller
- Lyle Overbay
- Pete Padgett
- Chris Prieto
- Chad Qualls
- Darrell Rasner
- Konrad Schmidt
- Braden Shipley
- Chris Singleton
- Cal Stevenson (born 1996)

== See also ==
- List of NCAA Division I baseball programs
