= William Peccole Park =

Baseball field in Reno, Nevada, US

- Location in Nevada Location in the United States Location in North America
- Interactive map of William Peccole Park
- Address: 1664 North Virginia Street
- Location: Reno, Nevada, U.S.
- Coordinates: 39°32′54.95″N 119°48′46.42″W
- Owner: University of Nevada, Reno
- Operator: University of Nevada, Reno
- Capacity: 3,000 (1988)
- Surface: Artificial Grass

Construction
- Groundbreaking: 1987; 39 years ago
- Opened: 1988; 38 years ago

Tenants
- Nevada Wolf Pack (NCAA) (1988–present); Reno Silver Sox (GBL) (2006–2008)

William Peccole Park is a stadium in Reno, Nevada. It is primarily used for baseball, and is the home field of the University of Nevada, Reno Wolf Pack baseball team. It played host to the Reno Silver Sox professional baseball team of the independent Golden Baseball League from 2006 to 2008.

The stadium opened in 1988 after University of Nevada alum William Peccole donated $300,000 to build it. An additional donation was provided in 1995 to expand it. It holds 3,000 people.

== See also ==
- List of NCAA Division I baseball venues
