= Sacred Heart Pioneers baseball =

Sacred Heart Pioneers
- 2026 Sacred Heart Pioneers baseball team
- Founded: 1966
- University: Sacred Heart University
- Head coach: Pat Egan (4th season)
- Conference: Metro Atlantic Athletic Conference
- Location: Fairfield, Connecticut
- Home stadium: Veterans Memorial Park
- Nickname: Pioneers
- Colors: Red and white

College World Series appearances
- Division II: 1976, 1992

NCAA tournament appearances
- Div. I: 2006, 2011, 2012, 2015; Division II: 1976, 1978, 1990, 1991, 1992

Conference tournament champions
- NEC: 2006, 2011, 2012, 2015

Conference regular season champions
- 2024

The Sacred Heart Pioneers baseball team is a varsity intercollegiate athletic team of Sacred Heart University in Fairfield, Connecticut, United States. The team is a member of the Metro Atlantic Athletic Conference, which is part of the National Collegiate Athletic Association's Division I. Sacred Heart's first baseball team was fielded in 1966. The Pioneers are coached by Pat Egan, who lead his first season as head coach in 2023.

The program transitioned to NCAA Division I in 2000 and has appeared in the NCAA Division I Baseball Championship four times since the transition. While at the NCAA Division II level, the Pioneers reached the 1976 and 1992 Division II College World Series. The Pioneers have seen fifteen players selected in the Major League Baseball draft. Former head coach Nick Giaquinto, was the schools all-time winnest coach, having won 631 games in 30 seasons.

== NCAA Tournament history ==
=== Division I ===
Sacred Heart has participated in the NCAA Division I baseball tournament four times.

Year	Region	Round	Opponent	Result
2006	Athens Regional	First Round; Lower Round	Georgia; Jacksonville	L 0–11; L 3–4
2011	Clemson Regional	First Round; Lower Round	Clemson; Connecticut	L 1–11; L 3–13
2012	Raleigh Regional	First Round; Lower Round	NC State; UNC Wilmington	L 5–16; L 4–13
2015	Fort Worth Regional	First Round; Lower Round	TCU; Stony Brook	L 0–10; L 6–11

=== Division II ===
Sacred Heart participated in the NCAA Division II baseball tournament five times.

Year	Region	Round	Opponent	Result
1976	College World Series	First Round; Second Round	Southeast Missouri State; Cal Poly Pomona	L 3–4 (11); L 1–12
1976	New England Regional			2–2
1990	Northeast Regional	First Round; Second Round	Merrimack; New Haven; New Haven	W 10–6; L 0–9; W 8–7; L 1–3
1991	Northeast Regional	First Round; Second Round	UMass Lowell; American International	L 2–12; L 11–12
1992	Northeast Regional; College World Series	First Round; Second Round; Third Round; CWS First Round; CWS Second Round	Adelphi; Springfield; Springfield; Cal Poly; West Alabama	W 2–0; W 5–3; W 2–1; L 1–10; L 6–7

== Coaching history ==
Records not available from 1966–74

Name	Tenure	Record	Pct
Pete Di Orio	1975–1976	31–24–1	.563
Unknown	1977–1978	35–16	.686
Terry Toigo	1979	17–8–1	.673
Mark Karagus	1980–1981	35–16–1	.683
Joe Reitano	1982–1984	51–39–1	.566
Jeff Bevino	1985	23–12	.657
Mark Julius	1986–1988	43–43	.500
Nick Giaquinto	1989–2017	631–752–3	.456
Nick Restaino	2018–2022	77–142–1	.352
Pat Egan	2023–present	63–53	.543

== See also ==
- List of NCAA Division I baseball programs
