= 2019 Indiana Hoosiers baseball team =

American college baseball season

2019 Indiana Hoosiers baseball

Big Ten regular season champions

Louisville Regional, L 7–9 vs. Louisville
- Conference: Big Ten Conference
- Record: 37–23 (17–7 Big Ten)
- Head coach: Jeff Mercer (1st season)
- Pitching coach: Justin Parker (1st season)
- Home stadium: Bart Kaufman Field (Capacity: 2,500)

2019 Big Ten Conference baseball standings
	Conf.				Overall
Team	W		L	PCT	W		L	PCT
Indiana ‍†‍‍^{y}	17	–	7	.708	37	–	23	.617
No. 2 Michigan ‍‍‍^{y}	16	–	7	.696	50	–	22	.694
Illinois ‍‍‍^{y}	15	–	9	.625	36	–	21	.632
Nebraska ‍‍‍^{y}	15	–	9	.625	32	–	24	.571
Minnesota ‍‍‍	15	–	9	.625	29	–	27	.518
Ohio State ‍‍‡‍^{y}	12	–	12	.500	36	–	27	.571
Iowa ‍‍‍	12	–	12	.500	31	–	24	.564
Maryland ‍‍‍	12	–	12	.500	29	–	29	.500
Northwestern ‍‍‍	11	–	13	.458	24	–	27	.471
Rutgers ‍‍‍	9	–	14	.391	20	–	31	.392
Michigan State ‍‍‍	8	–	15	.348	20	–	34	.370
Purdue ‍‍‍	7	–	16	.304	20	–	34	.370
Penn State ‍‍‍	4	–	18	.182	22	–	27	.449
† – Conference champion ‡ – Tournament champion y – Invited to the NCAA tournament As of July 4, 2019; Rankings from D1Baseball

The 2019 Indiana Hoosiers baseball team were a college baseball team that represented Indiana University in the 2019 NCAA Division I baseball season. The Hoosiers are members of the Big Ten Conference (B1G) and play their home games at Bart Kaufman Field in Bloomington, Indiana. They were led by first-year head coach Jeff Mercer.

== Previous season ==
The Hoosiers finished the 2018 NCAA Division I baseball season 40–19 overall (14–9 conference) and fifth place in conference standings. Following the conclusion of the regular season, the Hoosiers were selected to play in the 2018 NCAA tournament, beginning in the Austin Regional. The Hoosiers would eventually lose in the final round of the Austin Regional to Texas by a score of 2–3.

=== MLB draft ===
The following Hoosiers on the 2018 roster were selected in the 2018 Major League Baseball draft:

List of Drafted Players
Name	2018 Class	Pos.	Team	Round	Signed/Returned
Jonathan Steiver	Junior	RHP	Chicago White Sox	5th	Signed
Luke Miller	Junior	INF	Philadelphia Phillies	22nd	Signed
Logan Sowers	Senior	OF	Chicago White Sox	28th	Signed*
Tim Herrin	Junior	LHP	Cleveland Indians	29th	Signed

* indicates draftee had no more college eligibility

== Preseason ==
On June 25, 2018, Mississippi State confirmed that it had hired Chris Lemonis as their new head baseball coach, formally ending Lemonis' tenure with the Hoosiers. Lemonis compiled a 141–91–2 overall record, 55–37-1 conference record and three NCAA tournament appearances, while head coach of the Hoosiers.

On July 2, 2018, Indiana University Athletics announced the hiring of former Wright State head coach Jeff Mercer, to the head coaching position for the Hoosiers.

On July 18, 2018, Mercer made a notable acquisition to the Hoosiers' coaching staff with the hiring of former-MLB third baseman Scott Rolen as Director of Player Development.

=== Season projections ===
Coming off of an NCAA Regional appearance in 2018, the 2019 Hoosiers were projected to finish fourth in conference play by B1G coaches; however, other media outlets predicted the Hoosiers would finish as high as first in the B1G. The Hoosiers were ranked or received votes for rankings in two of the six major preseason polls and rankings. Indiana was ranked #37 in the NCBWA poll and received votes for ranking by Collegiate Baseball.

== Roster ==
2019 Indiana Hoosiers baseball team
Players
Coaches

#	Pos.	Name	B/T	Height	Weight	Year	Previous school	Home town
1	INF	Jeremy Houston	R/R	5 ft 8 in (1.73 m)	175 lb (79 kg)	So	Mount Carmel	Chicago, Illinois
2	INF	Cole Barr	R/R	5 ft 11 in (1.8 m)	191 lb (87 kg)	Fr	Yorktown High School	Yorktown, Indiana
4	INF	Cade Bunnell	L/R	6 ft 0 in (1.83 m)	182 lb (83 kg)	Jr	Stoughton High School	Stoughton, Wisconsin
5	RHP	Tanner Gordon	R/R	6 ft 5 in (1.96 m)	215 lb (98 kg)	Jr	John A. Logan College	Champaign, Illinois
6	OF	Grant Richardson	L/L	6 ft 2 in (1.88 m)	186 lb (84 kg)	Fr	Fishers	Fishers, Indiana
7	INF	Matt Gorski	R/R	6 ft 4 in (1.93 m)	195 lb (88 kg)	So	Hamilton Southeastern	Fishers, Indiana
8	INF	Drew Ashley	R/R	5 ft 1 in (1.55 m)	170 lb (77 kg)	So	Evansville Memorial	Chandler, Indiana
9	RHP	Alex Franklin	R/R	6 ft 3 in (1.91 m)	200 lb (91 kg)	Fr	Bloomington South	Bloomington, Indiana
10	INF	Justin Walker	S/R	6 ft 0 in (1.83 m)	195 lb (88 kg)	Fr	Lafayette Jefferson	Lafayette, Indiana
11	OF	Logan Kaletha	R/R	6 ft 0 in (1.83 m)	195 lb (88 kg)	Jr	Michigan City High School	Michigan City, Indiana
12	C	Jeff Holtz	R/R	6 ft 4 in (1.93 m)	215 lb (98 kg)	Fr	Arrowhead	Hartland, Wisconsin
13	RHP	Cal Krueger	R/R	6 ft 0 in (1.83 m)	185 lb (84 kg)	So	Jasper	Jasper, Indiana
14	INF	Matt Lloyd	L/R	6 ft 1 in (1.85 m)	195 lb (88 kg)	Jr	Foothills Composite	Okotoks, Alberta, Canada
15	RHP	Pauly Milto	R/R	6 ft 3 in (1.91 m)	240 lb (109 kg)	Jr	Roncalli	Greenwood, Indiana
16	RHP	Austin Long	R/R	6 ft 3 in (1.91 m)	215 lb (98 kg)	Fr	Bedford North Lawrence	Bedford, Indiana
18	LHP	Braden Scott	R/L	6 ft 3 in (1.91 m)	200 lb (91 kg)	So	Olney Central College	Jasonville, Indiana
19	LHP	Tommy Sommer	L/L	6 ft 4 in (1.93 m)	207 lb (94 kg)	Fr	Carmel	Carmel, Indiana
20	LHP	Brad Busald	L/L	6 ft 5 in (1.96 m)	210 lb (95 kg)	Jr	Lincoln Trail College	Rushville, Indiana
21	OF	Elijah Dunham	L/L	6 ft 0 in (1.83 m)	213 lb (97 kg)	Fr	FJ Ritz	Evansville, Indiana
23	LHP	Andrew Saalfrank	L/L	6 ft 3 in (1.91 m)	205 lb (93 kg)	So	Heritage	Hoagland, Indiana
25	RHP	Connor Manous	R/R	6 ft 0 in (1.83 m)	181 lb (82 kg)	Fr	Munster	Munster, Indiana
29	C	Ryan Fineman	R/R	6 ft 0 in (1.83 m)	215 lb (98 kg)	Jr	Agoura	Westlake Village, California
30	INF	Scotty Bradley	L/R	6 ft 2 in (1.88 m)	221 lb (100 kg)	So	Hopewell Valley Central	Pennington, New Jersey
31	LHP	Michael Dunkleberger	L/L	5 ft 11 in (1.8 m)	180 lb (82 kg)	Fr	St. Joseph	South Bend, Indiana
32	OF	Tyler Van Pelt	L/R	5 ft 11 in (1.8 m)	185 lb (84 kg)	Fr	Bloomington South	Bloomington, Indiana
33	C	Wyatt Cross	L/R	6 ft 3 in (1.91 m)	201 lb (91 kg)	Jr	Legacy	Broomfield, Colorado
34	RHP	Braydon Tucker	L/R	6 ft 4 in (1.93 m)	215 lb (98 kg)	Fr	Northview	Brazil, Indiana
35	RHP	Matt Litwicki	R/R	6 ft 1 in (1.85 m)	201 lb (91 kg)	Fr	Lake Central	Dyer, Indiana
37	RHP	Gabe Bierman	R/R	6 ft 2 in (1.88 m)	170 lb (77 kg)	Fr	Jeffersonville	Jeffersonville, Indiana
38	INF	Jake Skrine	R/R	6 ft 2 in (1.88 m)	200 lb (91 kg)	Fr	Mead	Longmont, Colorado
39	OF	Sam Crail	L/R	5 ft 10 in (1.78 m)	192 lb (87 kg)	Fr	Sheridan	Sheridan, Indiana
40	OF	Carter Bridge	R/R	6 ft 0 in (1.83 m)	180 lb (82 kg)	Jr	Heartland Community College	West Lafayette, Indiana
42	RHP	Grant Sloan	R/R	6 ft 4 in (1.93 m)	190 lb (86 kg)	So	Zionsville Community High School	Zionsville, Indiana
44	LHP	Cameron Beauchamp	L/L	6 ft 2 in (1.88 m)	205 lb (93 kg)	So	Peru High School	Peru, Indiana
51	RHP	McCade Brown	R/R	6 ft 6 in (1.98 m)	200 lb (91 kg)	Fr	Normal West	Normal, Illinois

Head coach

Jeff Mercer

Assistant coach(es)

Dan Held
Casey Dykes

Pitching coach(es)

Justin Parker

Legend

- (C) Team captain
- (S) Suspended
- (I) Ineligible
- Injured
- Current redshirt

Roster
Last update: February 17, 2019

== Schedule ==
Legend
Indiana win
Indiana loss
Postponement

2019 Indiana Hoosiers baseball game log
Regular season
February

#	Date	Opponent	Rank	Venue	Score	Overall record	Attendance	B1G record
	February 15	at Memphis		FedExPark • Memphis, Tennessee,	Postponed	–	-	–
1	February 16	at Memphis		FedExPark • Memphis, Tennessee	6–1	1–0	374	–
2	February 16	at Memphis		FedExPark • Memphis, Tennessee	3–6	1–1	391	–
3	February 17	at Memphis		FedExPark • Memphis, Tennessee	6–0	2–1	407	–
4	February 22	at Tennessee		Lindsey Nelson Stadium • Knoxville, Tennessee,	1–5	2–2	1,068	–
5	February 23	at Tennessee		Lindsey Nelson Stadium • Knoxville, Tennessee	0–11	2–3	981	–
6	February 24	at Tennessee		Lindsey Nelson Stadium • Knoxville, Tennessee	3–5	2–4	1,767	–
7	February 26	Cincinnati		Bart Kaufman Field • Bloomington, Indiana	7–1	3–4	1,171	–
8	February 27	Butler		Bart Kaufman Field • Bloomington, Indiana	9–3	4–4	1,087	–

March

#	Date	Opponent	Rank	Venue	Score	Overall record	Attendance	B1G record
	March 1	vs Northeastern		Conway, South Carolina (Coastal Carolina Tournament)	Postponed	–		–
9	March 2	vs Northeastern		Conway, South Carolina (Coastal Carolina Tournament)	6–4	5–4	205	–
10	March 2	vs Connecticut		Conway, South Carolina (Coastal Carolina Tournament)	9–6	6–4	275	–
11	March 3	vs No. 11 Coastal Carolina		Conway, South Carolina (Coastal Carolina Tournament)	5–6	6–5	1,613	–
12	March 5	Indiana State		Bart Kaufman Field • Bloomington, Indiana	Postponed	–		–
13	March 8	vs No. 29 Washington		T-Mobile Park • Seattle, Washington (Safeco Field Tournament)	1–0	7–5	1,250	–
14	March 9	vs No. 3 Oregon State		T-Mobile Park • Seattle, Washington (Safeco Field Tournament)	3–8	7–6	3,000	–
15	March 10	vs San Diego		T-Mobile Park • Seattle, Washington (Safeco Field Tournament)	3–5	7–7	750	–
16	March 13	at Cincinnati		Marge Schott Stadium • Cincinnati, Ohio,	5–7	7–8	1,063	–
17	March 15	Canisius		Bart Kaufman Field • Bloomington, Indiana	18–6	8–8	1,291	–
18	March 16	Canisius		Bart Kaufman Field • Bloomington, Indiana	5–2	9–8	1,501	–
19	March 16	Canisius		Bart Kaufman Field • Bloomington, Indiana	16–5	10–8	1,501	–
20	March 17	Canisius		Bart Kaufman Field • Bloomington, Indiana	12–1	11–8	1,395	–
21	March 19	at Indiana State		Bob Warn Field at Sycamore Stadium • Terre Haute, Indiana	15–14	12–8	1,108	–
22	March 22	Iowa		Bart Kaufman Field • Bloomington, Indiana	3–2	13–8	1,942	1–0
23	March 23	Iowa		Bart Kaufman Field • Bloomington, Indiana	13–1	14–8	2,271	2–0
24	March 24	Iowa		Bart Kaufman Field • Bloomington, Indiana	7–1	15–8	1,366	3–0
25	March 27	Kent State		Bart Kaufman Field • Bloomington, Indiana	8–9	15–9	1,827	3–0
26	March 29	at Maryland		Shipley Field • College Park, Maryland	0–2	15–10	571	3–1
27	March 30	at Maryland		Shipley Field • College Park, Maryland	20–5	16–10	899	4–1
28	March 31	at Maryland		Shipley Field • College Park, Maryland	19–4	17–10	534	5–1

April

#	Date	Opponent	Rank	Venue	Score	Overall record	Attendance	B1G record
29	April 3	Wright State		Bart Kaufman Field • Bloomington, Indiana	4–15	17–11	1,528	5–1
30	April 5	Penn State		Bart Kaufman Field • Bloomington, Indiana	0–3	17–12	1,784	5–2
31	April 6	Penn State		Bart Kaufman Field • Bloomington, Indiana	5–3	18–12	2,969	6–2
32	April 6	Penn State		Bart Kaufman Field • Bloomington, Indiana	3–2	19–12	2,969	7–2
33	April 10	Purdue		Bart Kaufman Field • Bloomington, Indiana	7–6	20–12	2,664	7–2
34	April 12	at Evansville		Charles H. Braun Stadium • Evansville, Indiana	5–0	21–12	1,367	7–2
35	April 13	Evansville		Bart Kaufman Field • Bloomington, Indiana	5–1	22–12	1,921	7–2
36	April 13	Evansville		Bart Kaufman Field • Bloomington, Indiana	9–3	23–12	1,921	7–2
37	April 14	Evansville		Bart Kaufman Field • Bloomington, Indiana	6–5	24–12	2,197	7–2
38	April 16	Ball State		Bart Kaufman Field • Bloomington, Indiana	14–3	25–12	1,960	7–2
39	April 19	at Michigan State		Drayton McLane Baseball Stadium at John H. Kobs Field • East Lansing, Michigan,	13–4	26–12	1,416	8–2
40	April 20	at Michigan State		Drayton McLane Baseball Stadium at John H. Kobs Field • East Lansing, Michigan	3–5	26–13	1,836	8–3
41	April 21	at Michigan State		Drayton McLane Baseball Stadium at John H. Kobs Field • East Lansing, Michigan	11–2	27–13	1,836	9–3
42	April 23	vs Ball State	No. 24	Victory Field • Indianapolis, Indiana	9–3	28–13	2,441	9–3
43	April 26	Minnesota	No. 24	Bart Kaufman Field • Bloomington, Indiana	3–7	28–14	2,386	9–4
44	April 27	Minnesota	No. 24	Bart Kaufman Field • Bloomington, Indiana	7–6	29–14	1,888	10–4
45	April 28	Minnesota	No. 24	Bart Kaufman Field • Bloomington, Indiana	7–1	30–14	2,096	11–4

May

#	Date	Opponent	Rank	Venue	Score	Overall record	Attendance	B1G record
46	May 3	at Illinois	No. 23	Illinois Field • Champaign, Illinois,	0–4	30–15	2,379	11–5
47	May 4	at Illinois	No. 23	Illinois Field • Champaign, Illinois	1–3	30–16	2,779	11–6
48	May 5	at Illinois	No. 23	Illinois Field • Champaign, Illinois	9–2	31–16	2,118	12–6
49	May 7	at Kentucky	No. 25	Cliff Hagan Stadium • Lexington, Kentucky,	2–5	31–17	3,162	12–6
50	May 10	at Michigan	No. 25	Ray Fisher Stadium • Ann Arbor, Michigan,	10–4	32–17	1,418	13–6
51	May 11	at Michigan	No. 25	Ray Fisher Stadium • Ann Arbor, Michigan	10–8	33–17	1,540	14–6
52	May 12	at Michigan	No. 25	Ray Fisher Stadium • Ann Arbor, Michigan	5–6	33–18	945	14–7
53	May 14	Louisville	No. 21	Bart Kaufman Field • Bloomington, Indiana	7–8	33–19	2,622	14–7
54	May 16	Rutgers	No. 21	Bart Kaufman Field • Bloomington, Indiana	7–5	34–19	1,829	15–7
55	May 17	Rutgers	No. 21	Bart Kaufman Field • Bloomington, Indiana	11–4	35–19	2,690	16–7
56	May 18	Rutgers	No. 21	Bart Kaufman Field • Bloomington, Indiana	13–3	36–19	2,673	17–7

Postseason
B1G Tournament

#	Date	Opponent	Venue	Score	Overall record	B1G record
57	May 22	Iowa	TD Ameritrade Park • Omaha, Nebraska,	2–4	36–20	17–7
58	May 23	Minnesota	TD Ameritrade Park • Omaha, Nebraska	4–9	36–21	17–7

NCAA tournament

#	Date	Opponent	Venue	Score	Attendance	Overall record
59	May 31	Illinois State	Jim Patterson Stadium • Louisville, Kentucky,	7–8	1,227	36–22
60	June 1	UIC	Jim Patterson Stadium • Louisville, Kentucky	9–5	758	37–22
60	June 2	Louisville	Jim Patterson Stadium • Louisville, Kentucky	7–9	2,339	37–23

"#" represents ranking. All rankings from Collegiate Baseball on the date of the contest.
"()" represents postseason seeding in the Big 10 Tournament or NCAA Regional, respectively.
Schedule Source

== Louisville Regional ==
Louisville Regional Teams
(1) Louisville Cardinals	(2) Indiana Hoosiers	(3) Illinois State Redbirds	(4) UIC Flames

First round
1	Louisville	5
4	UIC	3
3	Illinois State	8
2	Indiana	7
Lower round 1
4	UIC	5
2	Indiana	9

Semi-finals
1	Louisville	2
3	Illinois State	4
Lower final
2	Indiana	7
1	Louisville	9

Finals
3	Illinois State
1	Louisville

== Ranking movements ==
Ranking movements Legend: ██ Increase in ranking ██ Decrease in ranking — = Not ranked RV = Received votes
	Week																			
Poll	Pre	1	2	3	4	5	6	7	8	9	10	11	12	13	14	15	16	17	18	Final
Coaches'		*	—	—	—	—	—	—	—	RV	25	22	—	—	24	24				
Baseball America	—	—	—	—	—	—	—	—	—	—	25	22	—	—	20	24				
Collegiate Baseball^	RV	—	—	—	—	—	—	—	—	—	24	23	25	21	22	RV				
NCBWA†	37	—	—	—	—	—	—	—	—	—	26	23	—	30	25	30				
D1Baseball	—	—	—	—	—	—	—	—	—	—	23	19	—	25	21	RV				

^ Collegiate Baseball ranked 40 teams in their preseason poll, but only ranked 30 teams weekly during the season.
† NCBWA ranks 30 teams in their preseason poll, but only ranks 25 teams weekly during the season.
* A new poll was not released for this week, so for comparison purposes, the previous week's ranking is inserted in this week's slot.

== Awards and honors ==
=== Pre-season awards / Watch list ===
Awards
Player	Award	Date awarded	Ref.
Matt Lloyd	Collegiate Baseball; Second team Pre-season All-American	December 18, 2018	
Matt Gorski	Perfect Game; Second team Pre-season All-American	January 8, 2019	
Matt Lloyd	Perfect Game; Third team Pre-season All-American	January 8, 2019	
Matt Gorski	D1 Baseball; Second team Pre-season All-American	January 21, 2019	

=== Regular season awards / Watch lists ===
Weekly Awards
Player	Award	Date awarded	Ref.
Matt Gorski	Big Ten Player of the Week	March 3, 2019	
Pauly Milto	Big Ten Co-Pitcher of the Week	March 11, 2019	
Ryan Fineman	Big Ten Player of the Week	March 18, 2019	
Grant Richardson	Big Ten Player of the Week	March 25, 2019	
Grant Richardson	Big Ten Freshman of the Week	March 25, 2019	
Tanner Gordon	Big Ten Pitcher of the Week	March 25, 2019	
Matt Lloyd	Big Ten Player of the Week	April 1, 2019	
Grant Richardson	Big Ten Freshman of the Week	April 1, 2019	
Matt Gorski	Big Ten Player of the Week	April 22, 2019	
Gabe Bierman	Big Ten Freshman of the Week	May 13, 2019	

=== Conference awards ===
Weekly Awards
Player	Award	Date awarded	Ref.
Jeff Mercer	Big Ten Coach of the Year	May 21, 2019	
Andrew Saalfrank	Big Ten Pitcher of the year	May 21, 2019	
Matt Lloyd	All-Big Ten First Team	May 21, 2019	
Andrew Saalfrank	All-Big Ten First Team	May 21, 2019	
Scotty Bradley	All-Big Ten Second Team	May 21, 2019	
Cole Barr	All-Big Ten Second Team	May 21, 2019	
Matt Gorski	All-Big Ten Second Team	May 21, 2019	
Elijah Dunham	All-Big Ten Third Team	May 21, 2019	
Grant Richardson	All-Big Ten Freshman Team	May 21, 2019	

=== Award watch lists ===
Listed in the order that they were released

Award	Player	Position	Year	Date awarded	Ref
Buster Posey National Collegiate Catcher of the Year	Ryan Fineman	Catcher	JR	April 4, 2019	

== See also ==
- 2019 Big Ten Conference baseball tournament
- 2019 NCAA Division I baseball tournament
