= 2019 VCU Rams baseball team =

American college baseball season

2019 VCU Rams baseball

Atlantic 10 Regular season Champions

Spartanburg Classic Champions
- Conference: Atlantic 10 Conference
- Record: 39–19 (19–5 A-10)
- Head coach: Shawn Stiffler (7th season)
- Assistant coaches: Mike McRae (2nd season); Rich Witten (2nd season); Josh Tutwiler (4th season)
- Home stadium: The Diamond

2019 Atlantic 10 Conference baseball standings
	Conf.						Overall
Team	W		L		T	PCT	W		L		T	PCT
VCU ‍†‍‍	19	–	5	–	0	.792	39	–	19	–	0	.672
Davidson ‍‍‍	14	–	6	–	0	.700	29	–	22	–	0	.569
Dayton ‍‍‍	16	–	8	–	0	.667	32	–	26	–	1	.551
Fordham ‍‍‡‍^{y}	15	–	9	–	0	.625	38	–	24	–	0	.613
Richmond ‍‍‍	13	–	8	–	0	.619	28	–	25	–	1	.528
Rhode Island ‍‍‍	14	–	9	–	0	.609	24	–	29	–	0	.453
Saint Louis ‍‍‍	13	–	11	–	0	.542	25	–	30	–	0	.455
Saint Joseph's ‍‍‍	13	–	11	–	0	.542	21	–	28	–	0	.429
George Washington ‍‍‍	11	–	13	–	0	.458	30	–	24	–	0	.556
UMass ‍‍‍	8	–	14	–	0	.364	18	–	27	–	0	.400
St. Bonaventure ‍‍‍	6	–	18	–	0	.250	13	–	32	–	0	.289
George Mason ‍‍‍	5	–	19	–	0	.208	19	–	35	–	0	.352
La Salle ‍‍‍	4	–	20	–	0	.167	25	–	31	–	0	.446
† – Conference champion ‡ – Tournament champion y – Invited to the NCAA tournament As of June 4, 2019; Rankings from D1Baseball

The 2019 VCU Rams baseball team was the program's 49th baseball season. It was their 7th season the Atlantic 10 Conference. The regular season began on February 15, 2019, and concluded on May 18, 2019. The Rams finished as regular season champions.

== Preseason ==
=== A10 media poll ===
The A10 media poll was released on February 7, 2019, with the Rams predicted to finish in second place in the Atlantic 10.

Media poll (East)
Predicted finish	Team	Votes (1st place)
1	Saint Louis	(9)
2	VCU	(2)
3	Davidson	(1)
4	Fordham	(1)
5	George Mason	
6	Richmond	
7	Rhode Island	
8	George Washington	
9	Dayton	
10	Saint Joseph's	
11	St. Bonaventure	
12	La Salle	
13	UMass	

== Roster ==
2019 VCU Rams Roster
Pitchers: 9 – Hayden Moore – Junior; 10 – Connor Gillispie – Junior; 18 – Justin Sorokowski – RS Sophomore; 20 – Jaden Griffin – Freshman; 23 – David Dunn – Sophomore; 24 – Maddison Furman – Freshman; 25 – Benjamin Dum – Senior; 30 – Michael Dailey – Senior; 32 – Curtis Bafus – Senior; 33 – Sam Ryan – Junior; 34 – Brady Underwood – Sophomore; 38 – Danny Watson – Freshman; 39 – Evan Chenier – Freshman; 40 – Jack Alkire – Senior; 42 – Carter Knapek – RS Sophomore; 43 – Brooks Knapek – Sophomore	Infielders: 1 – Steven Carpenter – Junior; 2 – Paul Witt – Junior; 3 – Brett Willett – Junior; 4 – Noah Heisler – Freshman; 13 – Zach Ching – RS Senior; 14 – Brett Norwood – Junior; 16 – Liam Hibbits – Sophomore; 22 – Andrew Puglielli – Junior; 27 – Brett Young – Freshman; Utility: 8 – Hogan Brown – Sophomore; 19 – Jack Schroeder – Sophomore; 28 – Mac McCarty – Senior	Catchers: 15 – Hunter Vay – Sopohomore; 17 – Josh Simon – Junior; 21 – Logan Amiss – Freshman; 31 – Connor Hicks – Freshman; 36 – Matt Stallings – Sophomore; 37 – Andrew Schatz – Senior; Outfielders: 6 – Tomas Sanchez – Freshman; 12 – Brandon Henson – Junior; 26 – Cooper Benzin – Freshman; 41 – Alex Taylor – Freshman

== Game log ==
Legend
	VCU win
	VCU loss
	Postponement/cancellation
(10)	Extra innings
*	Non-conference game
**Bold**	VCU team member
†	Make-Up Game

2019 VCU Rams baseball game log
Regular season (39–17)

February (5–3)
Date	Opponent	Rank	Site/stadium	Score	Win	Loss	Save	Attendance	Overall record	A10 Record
Feb. 15	at No. 21 Coastal Carolina*; Chanticleer Classic		Springs Brooks Stadium • Conway, SC	**L** 8–10	M. Eardensohn (1–0)	**B. Dum (0–1)**	A. Abney (1)	2,507	0–1	—
Feb. 16	vs. Campbell*; Chanticleer Classic		Springs Brooks Stadium • Conway, SC	**W** 8–7	**E. Chenier (1–0)**	W. Tyson (0–1)	**M. McCarty (1)**	252	1–1	—
Feb. 17	vs. Maryland*; Chanticleer Classic		Springs Brooks Stadium • Conway, SC	**L** 3–5	N. Turnball (1–0)	**S. Ryan (0–1)**	J. Murphy (1)	271	1–2	—
Feb. 21	at Wofford*; Spartanburg Classic		Russell C. King Field • Spartanburg, SC	**W** 13–3	**C. Gillispie (1–0)**	A. Higginbotham (1–1)	none	139	2–2	—
Feb. 22	vs. Radford*; Spartanburg Classic		Russell C. King Field • Spartanburg, SC	**Cancelled**					2–2	—
Feb. 23	at USC Upstate*		Cleveland Harley Park • Spartanburg, SC	**W** 7–4	**J. Sorokowski (1–0)**	T. van der Weide (0–1)	**M. McCarty (2)**	269	3–2	—
Feb. 24	at USC Upstate*		Cleveland Harley Park • Spartanburg, SC	**W** 14–2	**J. Alkire (1–0)**	J. Thiessen (0–1)	none	257	4–2	—
Feb. 26	Maryland*		The Diamond • Richmond, VA	**L** 3–4	N. Turnball (2–0)	**B. Dum (0–2)**	J. Murphy (3)	274	4–3	—
Feb. 27	at No. 6 North Carolina*		Boshamer Stadium • Chapel Hill, NC	**W** 11–8	**E. Chenier (2–0)**	C. O'Brien (1–1)	none	1,469	5–3	—

March (16–4)
Date	Opponent	Rank	Site/stadium	Score	Win	Loss	Save	Attendance	Overall record	A10 Record
Mar. 1	Cornell*		The Diamond • Richmond, VA	**W** 6–1	**S. Ryan (1–0)**	S. Urbon (0–2)	none	240	6–3	—
Mar. 2	Cornell*		The Diamond • Richmond, VA	**W** 2–0	**B. Dum (1–2)**	C. Wyatt (0–1)	**M. McCarty (3)**	282	7–3	—
Mar. 2	Cornell*		The Diamond • Richmond, VA	**W** 9–3	**J. Alkire (2–0)**	L. Yacinich (0–1)	**D. Watson (1)**	391	8–3	—
Mar. 8	Lafayette*		The Diamond • Richmond, VA	**W** 6–3	**B. Dum (2–2)**	F. Craska (0–1)	**M. McCarty (4)**	258	9–3	—
Mar. 9	Lafayette*		The Diamond • Richmond, VA	**W** 7–6	**S. Ryan (2–1)**	K. Subers (0–1)	none	354	10–3	—
Mar. 10	Lafayette*		The Diamond • Richmond, VA	**W** 7–3	**C. Bafus (1–0)**	B. Kreyer (0–3)	none	338	11–3	—
Mar. 12	Marist*		The Diamond • Richmond, VA	**W** 8–1	**D. Watson (1–0)**	Z. Kmietek (0–2)	none	242	12–3	—
Mar. 13	Marist*		The Diamond • Richmond, VA	**W** 9–3	**E. Chenier (3–0)**	N. Cantone (0–1)	**S. Ryan (1)**	236	13–3	—
Mar. 15	at UCF*		John Euliano Park • Orlando, FL	**L** 9–10	C. Williams (2–1)	**C. Bafus (1–1)**	J. Hakanson (5)	1,242	13–4	—
Mar. 16	at UCF*		John Euliano Park • Orlando, FL	**W** 4–3	**B. Dum (3–2)**	J. Sinclar (2–2)	none	1,371	14–4	—
Mar. 17	at UCF*		John Euliano Park • Orlando, FL	**L** 2–8	T. Holloway (2–0)	**J. Sorokowski (1–1)**	Z. Hunsicker (1)	1,189	14–5	—
Mar. 19	William & Mary*		The Diamond • Richmond, VA	**L** 3–7	R. Prosperi (3–0)	**J. Alkire (2–1)**	none	373	14–6	—
Mar. 20	Towson*		The Diamond • Richmond, VA	**W** 6–0	**D. Watson (2–0)**	D. Repine (0–3)	**B. Dum (1)**	189	15–6	—
Mar. 22	UMass		The Diamond • Richmond, VA	**W** 5–2	**E. Chenier (4–0)**	J. Lasko (1–2)	**S. Ryan (2)**	249	16–6	1–0
Mar. 23	UMass		The Diamond • Richmond, VA	**W** 7–2	**B. Dum (4–2)**	Z. Clevenger (0–1)	none	317	17–6	2–0
Mar. 24	UMass		The Diamond • Richmond, VA	**W** 3–1	**J. Alkire (3–1)**	J. Pawloski (0–1)	none	338	18–6	3–0
Mar. 26	VMI*		The Diamond • Richmond, VA	**W** 15–2	**E. Chenier (5–0)**	Z. Sanders (0–2)	none	877	19–6	—
Mar. 29	Davidson		The Diamond • Richmond, VA	**L** 2–3	C. Sutherland (4–0)	**B. Dum (4–3)**	G. Levy (5)	471	19–7	3–1
Mar. 30	Davidson		The Diamond • Richmond, VA	**W** 7–3	**J. Alkire (4–1)**	D. Spear (0–1)	**S. Ryan (3)**	549	20–7	4–1
Mar. 31	Davidson		The Diamond • Richmond, VA	**W** 13–1	**C. Gillispie (2–0)**	G. Levy (1–1)	none	337	21–7	5–1

April (9–8)
Date	Opponent	Rank	Site/stadium	Score	Win	Loss	Save	Attendance	Overall record	A10 Record
Apr. 2	at Longwood*		Buddy Bolding Stadium • Farmville, VA	**Postponed**	—	—	—	—	—	—
Apr. 3	at Longwood*		Buddy Bolding Stadium • Farmville, VA	**W** 12–6	**D. Watson (3–0)**	A. Abdalah (0–2)	none	115	22–7	—
Apr. 5	at La Salle		Hank DeVincent Field • Philadelphia, PA	**W** 11–2	**J. Alkire (5–1)**	C. Kennedy (1–1)	none	80	23–7	6–1
Apr. 6	at La Salle		Hank DeVincent Field • Philadelphia, PA	**W** 9–6	**B. Dum (5–3)**	C. Scanlon (2–2)	**S. Ryan (4)**	145	24–7	7–1
Apr. 7	at La Salle		Hank DeVincent Field • Philadelphia, PA	**W** 28–4	**D. Dunn (1–0)**	J. Ray (1–4)	none	134	25–7	8–1
Apr. 9	at Old Dominion*; Rivalry		Metheny Ballpark • Norfolk, VA	**L** 5–6	M. Blanchard (1–0)	**S. Ryan (2–2)**	none	367	25–8	—
Apr. 12	Fordham		The Diamond • Richmond, VA	**W** 3–0	**J. Sorokowski (2–1)**	M. Mikulski (4–4)	**B. Dum (2)**	286	26–8	9–1
Apr. 13	Fordham		The Diamond • Richmond, VA	**L** 1–11	J. Stankiewicz (6–1)	**C. Bafus (1–2)**	none	318	26–9	9–2
Apr. 14	Fordham		The Diamond • Richmond, VA	**W** 8–3	**C. Gillispie (3–0)**	A. DiMeglio (2–3)	**S. Ryan (5)**	588	27–9	10–2
Apr. 16	Old Dominion*; Rivalry		The Diamond • Richmond, VA	**L** 5–7	A. Holiday (3–1)	**B. Dum (5–4)**	T. Fisher (4)	603	27–10	—
Apr. 19	at Richmond; Capital City Classic		Malcolm U. Pitt Field • Tuckahoe, VA	**L** 5–8	A. Balducci (2–2)	**S. Ryan (2–3)**	none	578	27–11	10–3
Apr. 20	at Richmond; Capital City Classic		Malcolm U. Pitt Field • Tuckahoe, VA	**W** 16–3	**J. Alkire (6–1)**	K. Morrison (1–1)	none	642	28–11	11–3
Apr. 21	at Richmond; Capital City Classic		Malcolm U. Pitt Field • Tuckahoe, VA	**L** 4–5 (11)	L. Looney (2–0)	**B. Dum (5–5)**	none	682	28–12	11–4
Apr. 23	at Maryland*		Shipley Field • College Park, MD	**L** 5–10	S. Fisher (1–1)	**D. Watson (1–3)**	none	431	28–13	—
Apr. 26	George Washington		The Diamond • Richmond, VA	**L** 1–2	T. Kuncl (1–1)	**B. Dum (5–6)**	none	308	28–14	11–5
Apr. 27	George Washington		The Diamond • Richmond, VA	**W** 4–3 (10)	**S. Ryan (3–3)**	J. Edwards (6–3)	none	611	29–14	12–5
Apr. 28	George Washington		The Diamond • Richmond, VA	**W** 9–7	**D. Watson (4–1)**	N. Woods (2–2)	**C. Bafus (1)**	537	30–14	13–5
Apr. 30	Virginia*; Duel at the Diamond		The Diamond • Richmond, VA	**L** 2–3	D. Ortiz (4–0)	**C. Gillispie (3–1)**	K. Whitten (9)	3,890	30–15	—

May (9–2)
Date	Opponent	Rank	Site/stadium	Score	Win	Loss	Save	Attendance	Overall record	A10 Record
May 1	at VMI*		Gray–Minor Stadium • Lexington, VA	**W** 11–2	**E. Chenier (6–0)**	C. Johnston (0–3)	none	348	31–15	—
May 5	at Duke*		Jack Coombs Field • Durham, NC	**L** 1–2	B. Gross (6–3)	**C. Gillispie (3–2)**	T. Girard (8)	737	31–16	—
May 5	at Duke*		Jack Coombs Field • Durham, NC	**W** 5–3	**S. Ryan (4–3)**	J. Carey (3–1)	none	737	32–16	—
May 8	at Norfolk State*		Marty L. Miller Field • Norfolk, VA	**W** 12–4	**D. Watson (5–1)**	K. Alicea (2–4)	none	189	33–16	—
May 10	at Saint Joseph's		Smithson Field • Merion, PA	**W** 9–3	**J. Sorokowski (3–1)**	J. Divalerio (4–5)	**B. Dum (3)**	229	34–16	14–5
May 11	at Saint Joseph's		Smithson Field • Merion, PA	**W** 13–3	**C. Gillispie (4–2)**	L. Zimmerman (1–2)	**D. Watson (2)**	255	35–16	15–5
May 12	at Saint Joseph's		Smithson Field • Merion, PA	**W** 4–0	**C. Bafus (2–2)**	R. Devine (2–2)	**S. Ryan (6)**	311	36–16	16–5
May 14	at Virginia*		Davenport Field • Charlottesville, VA	**L** 7–8	K. Whitten (2–1)	**B. Dum (5–7)**	R. Wilson (1)	3,147	36–17	—
May 16	at George Mason; Rivalry		Spuhler Field • Fairfax, VA	**W** 9–4	**C. Gillispie (5–2)**	P. Halligan (4–5)	**S. Ryan (7)**	119	37–17	17–5
May 17	at George Mason; Rivalry		Spuhler Field • Fairfax, VA	**W** 3–2	**C. Bafus (3–2)**	B. Marconi (3–8)	**B. Dum (4)**	142	38–17	18–5
May 18	at George Mason; Rivalry		Spuhler Field • Fairfax, VA	**W** 15–2	**J. Sorokowski (4–1)**	J. Dicesare (4–7)	none	324	39–17	19–5

Post-season (0–2)

Atlantic 10 Tournament (0–2)
Date	Opponent	Rank	Site/stadium	Score	Win	Loss	Save	Attendance	Overall record	Postseason Record
May 22	at (4) Fordham; First round	(1)	Houlihan Park • The Bronx, NY	**L** 1–2	J. Stankiewicz (8–3)	**C. Gillispie (5–3)**	K. Martin (10)	0	39–18	0–1
May 23	vs. (5) Richmond; Second round – Consolation bracket	(1)	Houlihan Park • The Bronx, NY	**L** 2–6	B. McGuigan (3–4)	**J. Sorokowski (4–2)**	J. Delarso (8)	668	39–19	0–2

== Rankings ==
Ranking movements Legend: ██ Increase in ranking ██ Decrease in ranking — = Not ranked RV = Received votes
	Week																			
Poll	Pre	1	2	3	4	5	6	7	8	9	10	11	12	13	14	15	16	17	18	Final
Coaches'	—	—*	—	—	—	—	—	—	—	—	—	—	—	—	—					
Baseball America	—	—	—	—	—	—	—	—	—	—	—	—	—	—	—					
Collegiate Baseball^	RV	—	—	—	—	—	RV	RV	—	—	—	—	—	—	—					
NCBWA†	—	—	—	—	—	—	—	—	—	—	—	—	—	—	—					
D1Baseball	—	—	—	—	—	—	—	—	—	—	—	—	—	—	—					

^ Collegiate Baseball ranked 40 teams in their preseason poll, but only ranked 30 teams weekly during the season.
† NCBWA ranks 30 teams in their preseason poll, but only ranks 25 teams weekly during the season.
* A new poll was not released for this week, so for comparison purposes, the previous week's ranking is inserted in this week's slot.
