= 2019 Maryland Terrapins baseball team =

American college baseball season

2019 Maryland Terrapins baseball
- Conference: Big Ten Conference
- Record: 29–29 (12–12 Big Ten)
- Head coach: Rob Vaughn (2nd season)
- Assistant coach: Anthony Papio (2nd season)
- Hitting coach: Matt Swope (2nd season)
- Pitching coach: Corey Muscara (2nd season)
- Home stadium: Shipley Field

2019 Big Ten Conference baseball standings
	Conf.				Overall
Team	W		L	PCT	W		L	PCT
Indiana ‍†‍‍^{y}	17	–	7	.708	37	–	23	.617
No. 2 Michigan ‍‍‍^{y}	16	–	7	.696	50	–	22	.694
Illinois ‍‍‍^{y}	15	–	9	.625	36	–	21	.632
Nebraska ‍‍‍^{y}	15	–	9	.625	32	–	24	.571
Minnesota ‍‍‍	15	–	9	.625	29	–	27	.518
Ohio State ‍‍‡‍^{y}	12	–	12	.500	36	–	27	.571
Iowa ‍‍‍	12	–	12	.500	31	–	24	.564
Maryland ‍‍‍	12	–	12	.500	29	–	29	.500
Northwestern ‍‍‍	11	–	13	.458	24	–	27	.471
Rutgers ‍‍‍	9	–	14	.391	20	–	31	.392
Michigan State ‍‍‍	8	–	15	.348	20	–	34	.370
Purdue ‍‍‍	7	–	16	.304	20	–	34	.370
Penn State ‍‍‍	4	–	18	.182	22	–	27	.449
† – Conference champion ‡ – Tournament champion y – Invited to the NCAA tournament As of July 4, 2019; Rankings from D1Baseball

The 2019 Maryland Terrapins baseball team was a baseball team that represented University of Maryland, College Park in the 2019 NCAA Division I baseball season. The Terrapins were members of the Big Ten Conference (B1G) and played their home games at Shipley Field in College Park, Maryland. They were led by second-year head coach Rob Vaughn.

== Previous season ==
The Terrapins finished the 2018 NCAA Division I baseball season 24–30 overall (9–14 conference) and ninth place in conference standings, failing to qualify for the Conference Tournament or the NCAA tournament.

=== MLB draft ===
The following Terrapins on the 2018 roster were selected in the 2018 Major League Baseball draft:

List of Drafted Players
Name	2018 Class	Pos.	Team	Round	Signed/Returned
Nick Dunn	Junior	INF	St. Louis Cardinals	5th	Signed
Marty Costes	Junior	OF	Houston Astros	22nd	Signed

== Roster ==
2019 Maryland Terrapins baseball team
Players
Coaches

#	Pos.	Name	B/T	Height	Weight	Year	Previous school	Home town
1	INF	Ben Cowles	R/R	6 ft 1 in (1.85 m)	180 lb (82 kg)	Fr	Newark H. S.	Newark, New York
4		Maxwell Costes	/	6 ft 1 in (1.85 m)	215 lb (98 kg)	Fr	Gilman School	Baltimore, Maryland
5	INF	Tommy Gardiner	/	5 ft 8 in (1.73 m)	160 lb (73 kg)	So	Lenape H. S.	Mount Laurel, New Jersey
6	INF	A. J. Lee	/	6 ft 0 in (1.83 m)	180 lb (82 kg)	Sr	St. John's College H. S.	Millersville, Maryland
7	RHP	Mike Vasturia	/R	6 ft 5 in (1.96 m)	255 lb (116 kg)	RS So	St. Augustine Prep	Medford, New Jersey
8		Michael Pinerio	/	6 ft 1 in (1.85 m)	170 lb (77 kg)	So	Los Osos H. S.	Rancho Cucamonga, California
9	LHP	Billy Phillips	/L	6 ft 1 in (1.85 m)	185 lb (84 kg)	RS Fr	St. Mark's H. S.	Wilmington, Delaware
10	RHP	Will Block	/R	5 ft 11 in (1.8 m)	200 lb (91 kg)	Fr	Loyola Blakefield	Fallston, Maryland
11	OF	Chris Alleyne	/	5 ft 9 in (1.75 m)	175 lb (79 kg)	So	Chestnut Hill Academy	Philadelphia, Pennsylvania
12	LHP	Tyler Blohm	/L	6 ft 3 in (1.91 m)	205 lb (93 kg)	Jr	Archbishop Spalding H. S.	Severna Park, Maryland
14	LHP	Grant Burleson	/L	5 ft 10 in (1.78 m)	160 lb (73 kg)	So	Parkside H. S.	Salisbury, Maryland
15	RHP	Trevor LaBonte	/R	6 ft 6 in (1.98 m)	210 lb (95 kg)	Fr	York H. S.	York, Maine
16	OF	Randy Bednar	/	5 ft 11 in (1.8 m)	200 lb (91 kg)	So	Landon School	Bethesda, Maryland
17	RHP	Hunter Parsons	/R	6 ft 3 in (1.91 m)	200 lb (91 kg)	Sr	Parkside H. S.	Fruitland, Maryland
18	RHP	Sean Burke	/R	6 ft 6 in (1.98 m)	230 lb (104 kg)	Fr	Saint John's H. S.	Sutton, Massachusetts
20	INF	Josh Maguire	/R	5 ft 8 in (1.73 m)	17 lb (8 kg)	Fr	Salesianum School	Newark, Delaware
21	INF	Kody Milton	/	6 ft 3 in (1.91 m)	205 lb (93 kg)	Fr	Severna Park H. S.	Severna Park, Maryland
22	RHP	Sean Heine	/R	6 ft 4 in (1.93 m)	210 lb (95 kg)	Fr	Shawnee H. S.	Medford, New Jersey
23	LHP	Drew Wilden	/L	6 ft 1 in (1.85 m)	195 lb (88 kg)	So	West Deptford H. S.	West Deptford Township, New Jersey
24	INF	Taylor Wright	/	6 ft 3 in (1.91 m)	180 lb (82 kg)	Sr	Colorado Northwestern C. C.	Vancouver, British Columbia
25	C	Justin Vought	/	6 ft 3 in (1.91 m)	195 lb (88 kg)	So	Wyoming Valley West H. S.	Wilkes-Barre, Pennsylvania
26	LHP	Tuck Tucker	/L	6 ft 4 in (1.93 m)	225 lb (102 kg)	Jr	Poteet H. S.	Mesquite, Texas
27	LHP	Andrew Vail	/L	6 ft 1 in (1.85 m)	170 lb (77 kg)	Fr	Gloucester Catholic H. S.	Woodstown, New Jersey
29	RHP	Elliot Zoellner	/R	6 ft 3 in (1.91 m)	190 lb (86 kg)	Jr	St. Mary's H. S.	Annapolis, Maryland
30	LHP	Sean Fisher	/L	6 ft 0 in (1.83 m)	214 lb (97 kg)	So	Parkside H. S.	Parsonsburg, Maryland
33	RHP	Mark Diluia	/R	6 ft 3 in (1.91 m)	185 lb (84 kg)	So	Marian Catholic H. S.	Flossmoor, Illinois
34	RHP	Zach Thompson	/R	6 ft 1 in (1.85 m)	190 lb (86 kg)	RS So	Archbishop Spalding H. S.	West River, Maryland
37	RHP	John Murphy	/R	6 ft 4 in (1.93 m)	245 lb (111 kg)	Sr	Gloucester Catholic H. S.	Merchantville, New Jersey
38	RHP	Nick Turnbull	/R	6 ft 5 in (1.96 m)	200 lb (91 kg)	Jr	The John Carroll School	Churchville, Maryland
40	OF	Caleb Walls	/	5 ft 10 in (1.78 m)	190 lb (86 kg)	Jr	State College Area H. S.	State College, Pennsylvania
41		Sebastian Holte-Mancera	/	5 ft 8 in (1.73 m)	190 lb (86 kg)	Jr	Woodbury H. S.	Woodbury, Minnesota
42	OF	Ben Irvine	/	6 ft 2 in (1.88 m)	175 lb (79 kg)	Jr	Peabody Veterans Memorial H. S.	Peabody, Massachusetts
43	C	Tavan Shahidi	/	6 ft 1 in (1.85 m)	225 lb (102 kg)	Jr	Ames H. S.	Ames, Iowa
44	C	Zach Doss	/	6 ft 1 in (1.85 m)	220 lb (100 kg)	Fr	North Point H. S.	Waldorf, Maryland
45	RHP	Daniel O'Connor	/R	6 ft 0 in (1.83 m)	190 lb (86 kg)	Fr	Calvert Hall College H. S.	Towson, Maryland

Head coach

Rob Vaughn

Assistant coach(es)

Anthony Papio

Hitting coach(es)

Matt Swope

Pitching coach(es)

Corey Muscara

Legend

- (C) Team captain
- (S) Suspended
- (I) Ineligible
- Injured
- Current redshirt

Roster
Last update: March 31, 2019

== Schedule ==
2019 Maryland Terrapins baseball game log
Regular season
February (5–2)

#	Date	Opponent	Site/stadium	Score	Win	Loss	Save	Attendance	Overall record	B1G record
1	February 15	vs Campbell	Springs Brooks Stadium • Conway, South Carolina,	6–10	Messer (1–0)	Zoellner (0–1)	None	205	0–1	0–0
2	February 16	at #21 Coastal Carolina	Springs Brooks Stadium • Conway, South Carolina	2–7	Veneziano (1–0)	Thmopson (0–1)	None	1,611	0–2	0–0
3	February 17	at VCU	Springs Brooks Stadium • Conway, South Carolina	5–3	Turnball (1–0)	Ryan (0–1)	Murphy (1)	271	1–2	0–0
4	February 22	Maine	Shipley Field • College Park, Maryland	4–0	Parsons (1–0)	Sinacola (0–1)	None	589	2–2	0–0
5	February 22	Maine	Shipley Field • College Park, Maryland	5–3	Thompson (1–1)	Kemble (0–1)	Turnbull (1)	589	3–2	0–0
6	February 24	Maine	Shipley Field • College Park, Maryland	9–6	Glock (1–0)	Geoffrion (0–1)	Murphy (2)	488	4–2	0–0
7	February 26	at VCU	The Diamond • Richmond, Virginia,	4–3	Turnbull (2–0)	Dum (0–1)	Murphy (3)	274	5–2	0–0

March (8–11)

#	Date	Opponent	Site/stadium	Score	Win	Loss	Save	Attendance	Overall record	B1G record
8	March 1	at Louisiana	M. L. Tigue Moore Field at Russo Park • Lafayette, Louisiana,	4–2	Parsons (2–0)	Leger (0–1)	Murphy (4)	4,668	6–2	0–0
9	March 2	at Louisiana	M. L. Tigue Moore Field at Russo Park • Lafayette, Louisiana	3–4	Cooke (1–0)	Fisher (0–1)	None	4,502	6–3	0–0
10	March 2	at Louisiana	M. L. Tigue Moore Field at Russo Park • Lafayette, Louisiana	1–2	Schultz (1–0)	Heine (0–1)	None	4,528	6–4	0–0
11	March 5	Delaware	Shipley Field • College Park, Maryland	11–6	O'Connor (1–0)	Silan (0–1)	None	261	7–4	0–0
12	March 8	at Stetson	Melching Field at Conrad Park • DeLand, Florida,	7–0	Parsons (3–0)	Peto (0–2)	None	752	8–4	0–0
13	March 9	at Stetson	Melching Field at Conrad Park • DeLand, Florida	7–12	Neilan (1–0)	Zoellner (0–2)	Nunez (2)	703	8–5	0–0
14	March 10	at Stetson	Melching Field at Conrad Park • DeLand, Florida	8–4	LaBonte (1–0)	Bogart (0–1)	None	722	9–5	0–0
15	March 13	at Delaware	Bob Hannah Stadium • Newark, Delaware	11–6	Glock (2–0)	Dubecq (0–1)	None	180	10–5	0–0
16	March 15	East Carolina	Shipley Field • College Park, Maryland	0–9	Agnos (3–1)	Parsons (3–1)	None	850	10–6	0–0
17	March 16	East Carolina	Shipley Field • College Park, Maryland	1–2	Smith (2–0)	Thompson (1–2)	Burleson (1)	915	10–7	0–0
18	March 17	East Carolina	Shipley Field • College Park, Maryland	0–3	Kuchmaner (2–0)	LaBonte (1–1)	None	823	10–8	0–0
19	March 19	at Elon	Walter C. Latham Park • Elon, North Carolina,	11–4	Glock (3–0)	Galbraith (0–1)	None	177	11–8	0–0
20	March 20	at Elon	Walter C. Latham Park • Elon, North Carolina	12–4	Tucker (1–0)	Albrittain (0–1)	None	215	12–8	0–0
21	March 22	Creighton	Shipley Field • College Park, Maryland	2–3	Ragan (3–1)	Parsons (3–2)	Kametas (3)	264	12–9	0–0
22	March 23	Creighton	Shipley Field • College Park, Maryland	3–5	Smith (3–0)	DiLuia (0–1)	None	419	12–10	0–0
23	March 24	Creighton	Shipley Field • College Park, Maryland	6–8	Johnson (2–0)	LaBonte (1–3)	TeBrake (1)	509	12–11	0–0
24	March 29	Indiana	Shipley Field • College Park, Maryland	2–0	Parsons (4–2)	Milto (4–2)	Murphy (5)	571	13–11	1–0
25	March 30	Indiana	Shipley Field • College Park, Maryland	5–20	Gordon (3–3)	Thompson (1–3)	None	899	13–12	1–1
26	March 31	Indiana	Shipley Field • College Park, Maryland	4–19	Saalfrank (2–1)	LaBonte (1–3)	None	534	13–13	1–2

April (9–9)

#	Date	Opponent	Site/stadium	Score	Win	Loss	Save	Attendance	Overall record	B1G record
27	April 2	William & Mary	Plumeri Park • Williamsburg, Virginia,	1–8	Haney (3–2)	Tucker (1–1)	None	333	13–14	1–2
28	April 5	at Illinois	Illinois Field • Champaign, Illinois,	4–2	Parsons (5–2)	Acton (1–1)	Murphy (6)	760	14–14	2–2
29	April 6	at Illinois	Illinois Field • Champaign, Illinois	1–5	Weber (2–1)	Thompson (1–4)	None	2,768	14–15	2–3
30	April 6	at Illinois	Illinois Field • Champaign, Illinois	8–4	Vail (1–0)	Schmitt (3–1)	None	2,768	15–15	3–3
31	April 9	William & Mary	Shipley Field • College Park, Maryland	16–10	DiLuia (1–1)	Cone (1–1)	None	409	16–15	3–3
32	April 10	West Virginia	Shipley Field • College Park, Maryland	1–8	Snyder (5–1)	Turnbull (2–1)	None	514	16–16	3–3
33	April 12	at Northwestern	Rocky Miller Park • Evanston, Illinois,	13–8	Parsons (6–2)	Lavelle (3–4)	None	264	17–16	4–3
34	April 13	at Northwestern	Rocky Miller Park • Evanston, Illinois	7–13	Paciorek (2–1)	Vail (1–1)	None	298	17–17	4–4
35	April 13	at Northwestern	Rocky Miller Park • Evanston, Illinois	12–10	DiLuia (2–1)	Alepra (0–2)	Murphy (7)	376	18–17	5–4
36	April 16	James Madison	Shipley Field • College Park, Maryland	1–14	Bechtold (2–1)	Heine (0–2)	None	378	18–18	5–4
37	April 17	at George Mason	Spuhler Field • Fairfax, Virginia,	5–9	Halligan (3–3)	Wilden (0–1)	None	162	18–19	5–4
38	April 20	Ohio State	Shipley Field • College Park, Maryland	14–8	Parsons (7–2)	Burhenn (5–2)	Fisher (1)	1,073	19–19	6–4
39	April 20	Ohio State	Shipley Field • College Park, Maryland	9–10	Magno (3–3)	Murphy (0–1)	None	1,073	19–20	6–5
40	April 21	Ohio State	Shipley Field • College Park, Maryland	1–5	Smith (4–2)	LaBonte (1–4)	None	515	19–21	6–6
41	April 23	VCU	Shipley Field • College Park, Maryland	10–5	Fisher (1–1)	Watson (3–1)	None	431	20–21	6–6
42	April 26	at Penn State	Medlar Field • University Park, Pennsylvania	5–2	Parsons (8–2)	Biasi (3–4)	Murphy (8)	393	21–21	7–6
43	April 27	Penn State	Medlar Field • University Park, Pennsylvania	6–4	Thompson (2–4)	Mock (2–3)	Murphy (9)	710	22–21	8–6
44	April 27	Penn State	Medlar Field • University Park, Pennsylvania	7–10	Mellott (2–3)	LaBonte (1–5)	Virbitsky (3)	710	22–22	8–7

May (6–5)

#	Date	Opponent	Site/stadium	Score	Win	Loss	Save	Attendance	Overall record	B1G record
45	May 1	at Villanova	Villanova Ballpark at Plymouth • Plymouth Meeting, Pennsylvania	5–2	Blohm (1–0)	Toohers (0–1)	Vail (1)	283	23–22	8–7
46	May 3	Michigan	Shipley Field • College Park, Maryland	7–10	Kauffmann (8–3)	Parsons (8–3)	Weiss (9)	633	23–23	8–8
47	May 4	Michigan	Shipley Field • College Park, Maryland	4–10	Henry (8–3)	Thompson (2–5)	None	817	23–24	8–9
48	May 5	Michigan	Shipley Field • College Park, Maryland	1–13	Criswell (5–1)	LaBonte (1–6)	None	185	23–25	8–10
49	May 10	at Minnesota	Siebert Field • Minneapolis, Minnesota	7–3	Parsons (9–3)	Lackney (2–4)	None	530	24–25	9–10
50	May 11	at Minnesota	Siebert Field • Minneapolis, Minnesota	3–9	Horton (1–0)	Thompson (2–6)	None	536	24–26	9–11
51	May 12	at Minnesota	Siebert Field • Minneapolis, Minnesota	1–2	Culliver (3–4)	Blohm (1–1)	Schulze (6)	618	24–27	9–12
52	May 14	at James Madison	Eagle Field at Veterans Memorial Park • Harrisonburg, Virginia,	6–5	Fisher (2–1)	Jones (2–1)	Murphy (10)	247	25–27	9–12
53	May 16	Iowa	Shipley Field • College Park, Maryland	8–6	Murphy (1–1)	Leonard (2–2)	None	630	26–27	10–12
54	May 17	Iowa	Shipley Field • College Park, Maryland	8–4	Thompson (3–6)	Baumann (4–4)	None	825	27–27	11–12
55	May 18	Iowa	Shipley Field • College Park, Maryland	10–8	Vail (2–1)	Leonard (2–3)	Murphy (11)	939	28–27	12–12

Postseason
B1G Tournament

#	Date	Opponent	Site/stadium	Score	Win	Loss	Save	Attendance	Overall record	B1G record
56	May 22	vs Illinois	TD Ameritrade Park • Omaha, Nebraska,	6–2	Parsons (10–3)	Leland (6–3)	None	-	29–27	12-12
57	May 23	vs Ohio State	TD Ameritrade Park Omaha • Omaha, Nebraska	2–3	Smith (6–4)	DiLuia (2–2)	Magno (12)	–	29–28	12–12
58	May 25	vs Michigan	TD Ameritrade Park Omaha • Omaha, Nebraska	4–10	Henry (9–5)	Blohm (1–2)	None	–	29–29	12–12

== Awards ==
=== Conference awards ===
Weekly Awards
Player	Award	Date awarded	Ref.
Maxwell Costes	All-Big Ten Freshman of the Year	May 21, 2019	
Maxwell Costes	All-Big Ten First Team	May 21, 2019	
Randy Bednar	All-Big Ten Second Team	May 21, 2019	
A. J. Lee	All-Big Ten Third Team	May 21, 2019	
Taylor Wright	All-Big Ten Third Team	May 21, 2019	
Hunter Parsons	All-Big Ten Third Team	May 21, 2019	
Michael Pineiro	All-Big Ten Third Team	May 21, 2019	
Maxwell Costes	All-Big Ten Freshman Team	May 21, 2019	
Michael Pineiro	All-Big Ten Freshman Team	May 21, 2019	

== See also ==
- 2019 Big Ten Conference baseball tournament
