= 2019 Purdue Boilermakers baseball team =

American college baseball season

2019 Purdue Boilermakers baseball
- Conference: Big Ten Conference
- Record: 20–34 (7–16 Big Ten)
- Head coach: Mark Wasikowski (3rd season)
- Assistant coach: Greg Goff (2nd season)
- Hitting coach: Cooper Fouts (1st season)
- Pitching coach: Elliott Cribby (1st season)
- Home stadium: Alexander Field

2019 Big Ten Conference baseball standings
	Conf.				Overall
Team	W		L	PCT	W		L	PCT
Indiana ‍†‍‍^{y}	17	–	7	.708	37	–	23	.617
No. 2 Michigan ‍‍‍^{y}	16	–	7	.696	50	–	22	.694
Illinois ‍‍‍^{y}	15	–	9	.625	36	–	21	.632
Nebraska ‍‍‍^{y}	15	–	9	.625	32	–	24	.571
Minnesota ‍‍‍	15	–	9	.625	29	–	27	.518
Ohio State ‍‍‡‍^{y}	12	–	12	.500	36	–	27	.571
Iowa ‍‍‍	12	–	12	.500	31	–	24	.564
Maryland ‍‍‍	12	–	12	.500	29	–	29	.500
Northwestern ‍‍‍	11	–	13	.458	24	–	27	.471
Rutgers ‍‍‍	9	–	14	.391	20	–	31	.392
Michigan State ‍‍‍	8	–	15	.348	20	–	34	.370
Purdue ‍‍‍	7	–	16	.304	20	–	34	.370
Penn State ‍‍‍	4	–	18	.182	22	–	27	.449
† – Conference champion ‡ – Tournament champion y – Invited to the NCAA tournament As of July 4, 2019; Rankings from D1Baseball

The 2019 Purdue Boilermakers baseball team was a baseball team that represented Purdue University in the 2019 NCAA Division I baseball season. The Boilermakers were members of the Big Ten Conference and played their home games at Alexander Field in West Lafayette, Indiana. They were led by third-year head coach Mark Wasikowski.

== Previous season ==
The Boilermakers finished the 2018 NCAA Division I baseball season 38–21 overall (17–6 conference) and second place in conference standings. Following the conclusion of the regular season, the Boilermakers were selected to play in the 2018 NCAA tournament, beginning in the Chapel Hill Regional. The Boilermakers would eventually lose in the second round of the Chapel Hill Regional to Houston by a score of 4–8.

=== MLB draft ===
The following Boilermakers on the 2018 roster were selected in the 2018 Major League Baseball draft:

List of Drafted Players
Name	2018 Class	Pos.	Team	Round	Signed/Returned
Tanner Andrews	Senior	RHP	Miami Marlins	10th	Signed*
Nick Dalesandro	Junior	C	Arizona Diamondbacks	10th	Signed
Jacson McGowan	Junior	1B	Tampa Bay Rays	11th	Signed

* indicates draftee had no more college eligibility

== Preseason ==
On July 2, 2018, Purdue hired Seattle Redhawks' Elliott Cribby to join the baseball team as pitching coach, replacing Steve Holm who left for the head baseball coaching position with Illinois State. On July 4, 2018, Purdue hired Cooper Fouts from Pepperdine as an assistant to round out the team's staff.

== Roster ==
2019 Purdue Boilermakers baseball team
Players
Coaches

#	Pos.	Name	B/T	Height	Weight	Year	Previous school	Home town
1	INF	Owen Jansen	L/R	5 ft 11 in (1.8 m)	190 lb (86 kg)	So	Iroquois Ridge H. S.	Oakville, Ontario
2	INF	Tyler Powers	R/R	5 ft 9 in (1.75 m)	155 lb (70 kg)	So	Lafayette Central Catholics Jr/Sr H. S.	Lafayette, Indiana
3	INF	Tanner Haston (redshirt)	R/R	5 ft 11 in (1.8 m)	175 lb (79 kg)	Fr	Mooresville H. S.	Mooresville, Indiana
4	OF	Skyler Hunter	S/R	5 ft 10 in (1.78 m)	185 lb (84 kg)	Jr	Hood River Valley H. S.	Hood River, Oregon
5	INF	Evan Albrecht	R/R	5 ft 10 in (1.78 m)	150 lb (68 kg)	Fr	West Bend West H. S.	West Bend, Wisconsin
7	C	Zac Fascia	L/R	6 ft 1 in (1.85 m)	220 lb (100 kg)	Jr	Indian Hills Community College	Brampton, Ontario
9	INF	Ryan Howe	R/R	6 ft 2 in (1.88 m)	180 lb (82 kg)	Fr	Prospect H. S.	Mount Prospect, Illinois
14	RHP	Cory Brooks	R/R	6 ft 1 in (1.85 m)	195 lb (88 kg)	RS Fr	Hillard Darby H. S.	Hilliard, Ohio
15	OF	Johnny Sage	L/R	5 ft 10 in (1.78 m)	185 lb (84 kg)	Jr	Yakima Valley College	Spokane, Washington
16	RHP	Trevor Cheaney (redshirt)	R/R	6 ft 2 in (1.88 m)	200 lb (91 kg)	Sr	Paris Junior College	Muenster, Texas
17	LHP	Jackson Smeltz (redshirt)	L/L	6 ft 3 in (1.91 m)	210 lb (95 kg)	Fr	McCutcheon H. S.	Lafayette, Indiana
18	INF	Nick Evarts	R/R	5 ft 11 in (1.8 m)	185 lb (84 kg)	Sr	Weatherford College	Colleyville, Texas
19	INF	Justin Fugitt (redshirt)	L/R	6 ft 1 in (1.85 m)	175 lb (79 kg)	So	Hilliard Darby H. S.	Hilliard, Ohio
20	OF	Seth Gergely	L/L	6 ft 3 in (1.91 m)	175 lb (79 kg)	Fr	Tallmadge H. S.	Tallmadge, Ohio
22	C	Bryce Bonner	R/R	5 ft 9 in (1.75 m)	180 lb (82 kg)	Jr	Jesuit College Preparatory School of Dallas	Katy, Texas
23	OF	Charlie Nasuti	R/R	5 ft 11 in (1.8 m)	175 lb (79 kg)	So	St. John Bosco H. S.	Long Beach, California
25	OF	Milo Beam	L/L	6 ft 3 in (1.91 m)	170 lb (77 kg)	Jr	Westfield H. S.	Westfield, Indiana
26	RHP	Grant Brunt (redshirt)	R/R	5 ft 11 in (1.8 m)	205 lb (93 kg)	Fr	Chesterton H. S.	Chesterton, Indiana
28	LHP	James Kulak	L/L	6 ft 3 in (1.91 m)	175 lb (79 kg)	Fr	Neuqua Valley H. S.	Naperville, Illinois
29	C	Blake Schmidt	L/R	6 ft 0 in (1.83 m)	200 lb (91 kg)	Fr	Page H. S.	Franklin, Tennessee
30	LHP	Patrick J. Smith	L/L	6 ft 2 in (1.88 m)	215 lb (98 kg)	Sr	Heartland Community College	Schaumburg, Illinois
31	RHP	Conner Tomasic	R/R	6 ft 0 in (1.83 m)	175 lb (79 kg)	Fr	Lake Central H. S.	Schererville, Indiana
32	INF	Cole McKenzie	L/R	6 ft 2 in (1.88 m)	185 lb (84 kg)	Jr	Yakima Valley College	Billings, Montana
33	C	Luke Houin (redshirt)	R/R	6 ft 0 in (1.83 m)	205 lb (93 kg)	Fr	St. Joseph H. S.	Plymouth, Indiana
34	RHP	Andrew Bohm	R/R	6 ft 1.5 in (1.87 m)	227 lb (103 kg)	RS So	Hamilton Southeastern H. S.	Fishers, Indiana
35	OF	Ben Nisle	R/R	6 ft 2 in (1.88 m)	200 lb (91 kg)	So	Lake Central H. S.	Schererville, Indiana
36	RHP	Trent Johnson	R/R	6 ft 2 in (1.88 m)	190 lb (86 kg)	So	Crawfordsville H. S.	Crawfordsville, Indiana
37	LHP	Ryan Beard	L/L	6 ft 4 in (1.93 m)	215 lb (98 kg)	Sr	College of Southern Idaho	Boise, Idaho
38	RHP	Kyle Wade	R/R	6 ft 2 in (1.88 m)	225 lb (102 kg)	Fr	Kokomo H. S.	Kokomo, Indiana
40	RHP	Dalton Parker	R/R	6 ft 4 in (1.93 m)	216 lb (98 kg)	Jr	St. Joseph-Ogden H. S.	St. Joseph, Illinois
41	OF	Patrick W. Smith	L/R	5 ft 11 in (1.8 m)	175 lb (79 kg)	RS Fr	Oak Ridge H. S.	El Dorado Hills, California
42	LHP	Matt Moore	L/L	6 ft 3 in (1.91 m)	219 lb (99 kg)	RS So	Avon H. S.	Avon, Indiana
43	LHP	Hayden Wynja	L/L	6 ft 8 in (2.03 m)	200 lb (91 kg)	RS Fr	Heritage Christian School	Indianapolis, Indiana
46	RHP	Austin Peterson	R/R	6 ft 6 in (1.98 m)	230 lb (104 kg)	Fr	Chesterton H. S.	Chesterton, Indiana
48	RHP	Bo Hofstra	R/R	6 ft 5 in (1.96 m)	238 lb (108 kg)	So	Illiana Christian H. S.	Schererville, Indiana

Head coach

44 Mark Wasikowski

Assistant coach(es)

39 Greg Goff

Hitting coach(es)

11 Cooper Fouts

Pitching coach(es)

21 Elliott Cribby

Legend

- (C) Team captain
- (S) Suspended
- (I) Ineligible
- Injured
- Current redshirt

Roster
Last update: January 15, 2018

== Schedule ==
2019 Purdue Boilermakers baseball game log
Regular season
February (1–6)

#	Date	Opponent	Site/stadium	Score	Win	Loss	Save	Attendance	Overall record	B1G record
1	February 15	at Southern Miss	Pete Taylor Park • Hattiesburg, Mississippi	6–7	Strickland (1–0)	Peterson (0–1)	None	–	0–1	0–0
2	February 16	at Southern Miss	Pete Taylor Park • Hattiesburg, Mississippi	2–4	Powers (1–0)	Beard (0–1)	C. Carrol (1)	4,078	0–2	0–0
3	February 17	at Southern Miss	Pete Taylor Park • Hattiesburg, Mississippi	7–16	Stanley (1–0)	Peterson (0–2)	None	3,539	0–3	0–0
4	February 22	at #23 Texas	UFCU Disch–Falk Field • Austin, Texas	2–7	Henley (1–0)	Beard (0–2)	None	–	0–4	0–0
5	February 23	at #23 Texas	UFCU Disch–Falk Field • Austin, Texas	6–13	Elder (1–0)	Parker (0–2)	None	–	0–5	0–0
6	February 23	at #23 Texas	UFCU Disch–Falk Field • Austin, Texas	4–0	Hofstra (1–0)	Stevens (0–1)	None	6,147	1–5	0–0
7	February 24	at #23 Texas	UFCU Disch–Falk Field • Austin, Texas	0–3	Whelan (1–0)	P. J. Smith (0–1)	Quintanilla (1)	5,155	1–6	0–0

March (9–10)

#	Date	Opponent	Site/stadium	Score	Win	Loss	Save	Attendance	Overall record	B1G record
8	March 1	at Oral Roberts	J. L. Johnson Stadium • Tulsa, Oklahoma	1–5	McMinn (2–1)	Parker (0–2)	None	–	1–7	0–0
9	March 1	at Oral Roberts	J. L. Johnson Stadium • Tulsa, Oklahoma	4–10	Larkins (1–0)	Bohm (0–1)	None	684	1–8	0–0
10	March 2	at Oral Roberts	J. L. Johnson Stadium • Tulsa, Oklahoma	2–3	Swift (1–0)	Johnson (0–1)	Wolf (2)	716	1–9	0–0
11	March 3	at Oral Roberts	J. L. Johnson Stadium • Tulsa, Oklahoma	Cancelled	–	–	–	–	1–9	0–0
12	March 9	vs NJIT	Big League Camp • Marion, North Carolina	3–9	Georgini (1–0)	Hofstra (1–1)	None	113	1–10	0–0
13	March 9	vs NJIT	Big League Camp • Marion, North Carolina	9–8	Peterson (1–2)	Hunter (1–1)	None	113	2–10	0–0
14	March 10	vs NJIT	Big League Camp • Marion, North Carolina	3–2	Moore (1–0)	Lubreski (2–2)	Johnson (1)	123	3–10	0–0
15	March 12	Milwaukee	Alexander Field • West Lafayette, Indiana	1–6	McIntosh (2–0)	Wade (0–1)	None	883	3–11	0–0
16	March 13	at Indiana State	Bob Warn Field at Sycamore Stadium • Terre Haute, Indiana	3–4	Cross (2–0)	Peterson (1–3)	Grauer (2)	653	3–12	0–0
17	March 15	at Jacksonville State	Rudy Abbott Field • Jacksonville, Alabama	0–4	Farmer (2–0)	Bohm (0–2)	Edwards (4)	970	3–13	0–0
18	March 16	at Jacksonville State	Rudy Abbott Field • Jacksonville, Alabama	9–5	P. J. Smith (1–1)	Fortner (1–3)	None	789	4–13	0–0
19	March 17	at Jacksonville State	Rudy Abbott Field • Jacksonville, Alabama	0–3	Woods (2–0)	Beard (0–3)	Edwards (5)	1,017	4–14	0–0
20	March 19	at Ball State	Ball Diamond • Muncie, Indiana	0–6	McDermott (2–0)	Peterson (1–4)	None	411	4–15	0–0
21	March 20	Bowling Green	Alexander Field • West Lafayette, Indiana	9–2	Wade (1–1)	Stopp (1–1)	None	862	5–15	0–0
22	March 22	at Northwestern	Rocky Miller Park • Evanston, Illinois	5–2	P. J. Smith (2–1)	Lavelle (1–3)	Hofstra (1)	232	6–15	1–0
23	March 23	at Northwestern	Rocky Miller Park • Evanston, Illinois	1–2	Christie (1–2)	Bohm (0–3)	Paciorek (3)	392	6–16	1–1
24	March 24	at Northwestern	Rocky Miller Park • Evanston, Illinois	9–7	Moore (2–0)	Hanks (2–1)	Hofstra (2)	212	7–16	2–1
25	March 25	Valparaiso	Alexander Field • West Lafayette, Indiana	5–1	Wade (2–1)	Fricke (0–1)	None	1,135	8–16	2–1
26	March 29	Penn State	Alexander Field • West Lafayette, Indiana	1–0	P. J. Smith (3–1)	Biasi (2–3)	Hofstra (3)	961	9–16	3–1
27	March 31	Penn State	Alexander Field • West Lafayette, Indiana	2–1	Hofstra (2–1)	Virbitsky (1–1)	None	949	10–16	4–1
28	March 31	Penn State	Alexander Field • West Lafayette, Indiana	Cancelled	–	–	–	–	–	–

April (7–10)

#	Date	Opponent	Site/stadium	Score	Win	Loss	Save	Attendance	Overall record	B1G record
29	April 3	Indiana State	Alexander Field • West Lafayette, Indiana	3–4	Ward (2–0)	Johnson (0–2)	Grauer (4)	1,430	10–17	4–1
30	April 5	at Nebraska	Hawks Field • Lincoln, Nebraska	0–17	Waldron (4–0)	P. J. Smith (3–2)	None	5,038	10–18	4–2
31	April 6	at Nebraska	Hawks Field • Lincoln, Nebraska	4–13	Mi. Waldron (1–0)	Bohm (0–4)	Palkert (1)	5,897	10–19	4–3
32	April 7	at Nebraska	Hawks Field • Lincoln, Nebraska	5–9	Eddins (2–2)	Beard (0–4)	None	5,346	10–20	4–4
33	April 10	at Indiana	Bart Kaufman Field • Bloomington, Indiana	6–7	Sloan (2–2)	Hofstra (2–2)	None	2,664	10–21	4–4
34	April 12	at Iowa	Duane Banks Field • Iowa City, Iowa	4–10	McDonald (3–3)	P. J. Smith (3–3)	None	1,385	10–22	4–5
35	April 13	at Iowa	Duane Banks Field • Iowa City, Iowa	9–5	Moore (3–0)	Davitt (1–1)	None	1,414	11–22	5–5
36	April 13	at Iowa	Duane Banks Field • Iowa City, Iowa	3–6	Judkins (4–3)	Beard (0–5)	Leonard (8)	1,414	11–23	5–6
37	April 16	Butler	Alexander Field • West Lafayette, Indiana	5–3	Johnson (1–2)	Voss (2–1)	Hofstra (4)	1,726	12–23	5–6
38	April 19	at Rutgers	Bainton Field • Piscataway, New Jersey	0–2	Rutkowski (2–3)	Bohm (0–5)	S. Brito (7)	273	12–24	5–7
39	April 20	at Rutgers	Bainton Field • Piscataway, New Jersey	6–2	Johnson (2–2)	Genuario (2–3)	Hofstra (5)	561	13–24	6–7
40	April 21	at Rutgers	Bainton Field • Piscataway, New Jersey	1–6	Murray (3–3)	Kolak (0–1)	S. Brito (8)	386	13–25	6–8
41	April 23	Chicago State	Alexander Field • West Lafayette, Indiana	10–1	Brooks (1–0)	Venturi (0–4)	None	963	14–25	6–8
42	April 24	Purdue Fort Wayne	Alexander Field • West Lafayette, Indiana	11–2	P. J. Smith (4–3)	Odzark (0–7)	None	1,370	15–25	6–8
43	April 26	Southeast Missouri State	Alexander Field • West Lafayette, Indiana	8–3	Johnson 3–2	Dodd (4–5)	None	1,158	16–25	6–8
44	April 27	Southeast Missouri State	Alexander Field • West Lafayette, Indiana	2–3	Sachse (5–5)	Bohm (0–6)	Stretch (4)	1,288	16–26	6–8
45	April 28	Southeast Missouri State	Alexander Field • West Lafayette, Indiana	6–2	Kulak (1–1)	Niznik (2–3)	Peterson (1)	1,284	17–26	6–8

May (3–8)

#	Date	Opponent	Site/stadium	Score	Win	Loss	Save	Attendance	Overall record	B1G record
46	May 3	Michigan State	Alexander Field • West Lafayette, Indiana	2–0	Moore (4–0)	Eira (2–8)	Hofsta (6)	1,360	18–26	7–8
47	May 4	Michigan State	Alexander Field • West Lafayette, Indiana	1–5	Tyranski (2–7)	Bohm (0–7)	None	1,625	18–27	7–9
48	May 5	Michigan State	Alexander Field • West Lafayette, Indiana	4–7	Panaranto (3–0)	Parker (0–3)	Diaz (6)	1,939	18–28	7–10
49	May 7	Ball State	Alexander Field • West Lafayette, Indiana	9–3	Kulak (2–1)	Jaksich (0–2)	None	1,246	19–28	7–10
50	May 10	at #25 Illinois	Illinois Field • Champaign, Illinois	2–5	Leland (4–2)	Bohm (0–8)	None	1,027	19–29	7–11
51	May 11	at #25 Illinois	Illinois Field • Champaign, Illinois	4–5	Schmitt (4–2)	Peterson (1–5)	Sefcik (2)	502	19–30	7–12
52	May 12	at #25 Illinois	Illinois Field • Champaign, Illinois	4–6	Harris (4–2)	Wade (2–2)	Acton (17)	614	19–31	7–13
53	May 14	Xavier	Alexander Field • West Lafayette, Indiana	4–3	Moore (5–0)	Schramm (2–2)	Hofstra (7)	1,526	20–31	7–13
54	May 16	Ohio State	Alexander Field • West Lafayette, Indiana	0–7	Burhenn (6–3)	Johnson (3–3	None	1,325	20–32	7–14
55	May 17	Ohio State	Alexander Field • West Lafayette, Indiana	1–6	Lonsway (7–4)	P. J. Smith (4–4)	None	1,573	20–33	7–15
56	May 18	Ohio State	Alexander Field • West Lafayette, Indiana	11–13	Magno (4–3)	Bohm (0–9)	None	1,512	20–34	7–16

== Awards ==
=== Conference awards ===
Weekly Awards
Player	Award	Date Awarded	Ref.
Bo Hosftra	All-Big Ten Third Team	May 21, 2019	
Cole McKenzie	All-Big Ten Third Team	May 21, 2019	
