= 2018 Big Ten baseball tournament =

2018 Big Ten Conference baseball tournament
- Teams: 8
- Format: Double-elimination
- Finals site: TD Ameritrade Park Omaha; Omaha, Nebraska
- Champions: Minnesota (10th title)
- Winning coach: John Anderson (10th title)
- MVP: Jordan Kozicky (Minnesota)
- Television: BTN

2018 Big Ten Conference baseball standings
	Conf.				Overall
Team	W		L	PCT	W		L	PCT
No. 15 Minnesota ‍†‍‡‍	18	–	4	.818	44	–	13	.772
No. 27 Purdue ‍‍‍	17	–	6	.739	38	–	21	.644
Michigan ‍‍‍	15	–	8	.652	33	–	21	.611
Illinois ‍‍‍	15	–	9	.625	33	–	20	.623
Indiana ‍‍‍	14	–	9	.609	40	–	19	.678
Iowa ‍‍‍	13	–	9	.591	33	–	20	.623
Ohio State ‍‍‍	14	–	10	.583	36	–	24	.600
Michigan State ‍‍‍	11	–	12	.478	20	–	32	.385
Maryland ‍‍‍	9	–	14	.391	24	–	30	.444
Nebraska ‍‍‍	8	–	14	.364	24	–	28	.462
Rutgers ‍‍‍	7	–	16	.304	25	–	25	.500
Northwestern ‍‍‍	6	–	18	.250	17	–	32	.347
Penn State ‍‍‍	3	–	21	.125	15	–	34	.306
‡ – Tournament champion As of June 24, 2023; Rankings from Collegiate Baseball

The 2018 Big Ten Conference baseball tournament was held at TD Ameritrade Park Omaha in Omaha, Nebraska, from May 23 through 27. The event aired on the Big Ten Network. This was the return of the event to Omaha, after it had been hosted by Indiana the previous year.

== Format and seeding ==
The 2018 tournament was an 8 team double-elimination tournament. The top eight teams based on conference regular season winning percentage earned invites to the tournament. The teams then played a double-elimination tournament leading to a single championship game.

== Bracket ==
First round
1	Minnesota	3
8	Michigan State	2
4	Illinois	7
5	Indiana	1
8	Michigan State	5
5	Indiana	6^{10}
2	Purdue	8
7	Ohio State	2
3	Michigan	2^{10}
6	Iowa	1
6	Iowa	0
7	Ohio State	2

Second round
1	Minnesota	3
4	Illinois	0
5	Indiana	4
4	Illinois	5
2	Purdue	5
3	Michigan	4
7	Ohio State	5
3	Michigan	3

Semifinals
1	Minnesota	8
7	Ohio State	1
2	Purdue	11
4	Illinois	5

Finals
1	Minnesota	6
2	Purdue	4
