= 2019 Big Ten baseball tournament =

2019 Big Ten Conference baseball tournament
- Teams: 8
- Format: Double-elimination
- Finals site: TD Ameritrade Park Omaha; Omaha, Nebraska
- Champions: Ohio State (10th title)
- Winning coach: Greg Beals (2nd title)
- Television: BTN

2019 Big Ten Conference baseball standings
	Conf.				Overall
Team	W		L	PCT	W		L	PCT
Indiana ‍†‍‍^{y}	17	–	7	.708	37	–	23	.617
No. 2 Michigan ‍‍‍^{y}	16	–	7	.696	50	–	22	.694
Illinois ‍‍‍^{y}	15	–	9	.625	36	–	21	.632
Nebraska ‍‍‍^{y}	15	–	9	.625	32	–	24	.571
Minnesota ‍‍‍	15	–	9	.625	29	–	27	.518
Ohio State ‍‍‡‍^{y}	12	–	12	.500	36	–	27	.571
Iowa ‍‍‍	12	–	12	.500	31	–	24	.564
Maryland ‍‍‍	12	–	12	.500	29	–	29	.500
Northwestern ‍‍‍	11	–	13	.458	24	–	27	.471
Rutgers ‍‍‍	9	–	14	.391	20	–	31	.392
Michigan State ‍‍‍	8	–	15	.348	20	–	34	.370
Purdue ‍‍‍	7	–	16	.304	20	–	34	.370
Penn State ‍‍‍	4	–	18	.182	22	–	27	.449
† – Conference champion ‡ – Tournament champion y – Invited to the NCAA tournament As of July 4, 2019; Rankings from D1Baseball

The 2019 Big Ten Conference baseball tournament was held at TD Ameritrade Park Omaha in Omaha, Nebraska, from May 22 through 26. The event aired on the Big Ten Network.

== Format and seeding ==
The 2019 tournament was an 8 team double-elimination tournament. The top eight teams based on conference regular season winning percentage earned invites to the tournament. The teams then played a double-elimination tournament leading to a single championship game. A run rule (10 run lead after 7 innings) was in effect for the tournament.

== Bracket ==
First round
1	Indiana	2
8	Iowa	4
4	Minnesota	2
5	Nebraska	8
1	Indiana	4
4	Minnesota	9
2	Michigan	1
7	Ohio State	2
3	Illinois	2
6	Maryland	6
2	Michigan	5
3	Illinois	4

Second round
8	Iowa	1
5	Nebraska	11
4	Minnesota	3
8	Iowa	0
7	Ohio State	3
6	Maryland	2
2	Michigan	10
6	Maryland	4

Semifinals
5	Nebraska	8	7
2	Michigan	18	3
7	Ohio State	6	8
4	Minnesota	9	6

Finals
5	Nebraska	1
7	Ohio State	3

== Conference championship ==
Big Ten Championship
(5) Nebraska Cornhuskers	vs.	(7) Ohio State Buckeyes

May 26, 2019, 3:30 p.m. (DT) at TD Ameritrade Park Omaha in Omaha, Nebraska
Team	1	2	3	4	5	6	7	8	9	R	H	E
(5) Nebraska	0	0	0	0	0	1	0	0	0	1	4	1
(7) Ohio State	1	0	0	1	0	0	0	1	X	3	8	1
WP: Griffan Smith (7–4) LP: Matt Waldron (6–4) Sv: Andrew Magno (14); Attendance: 17,503

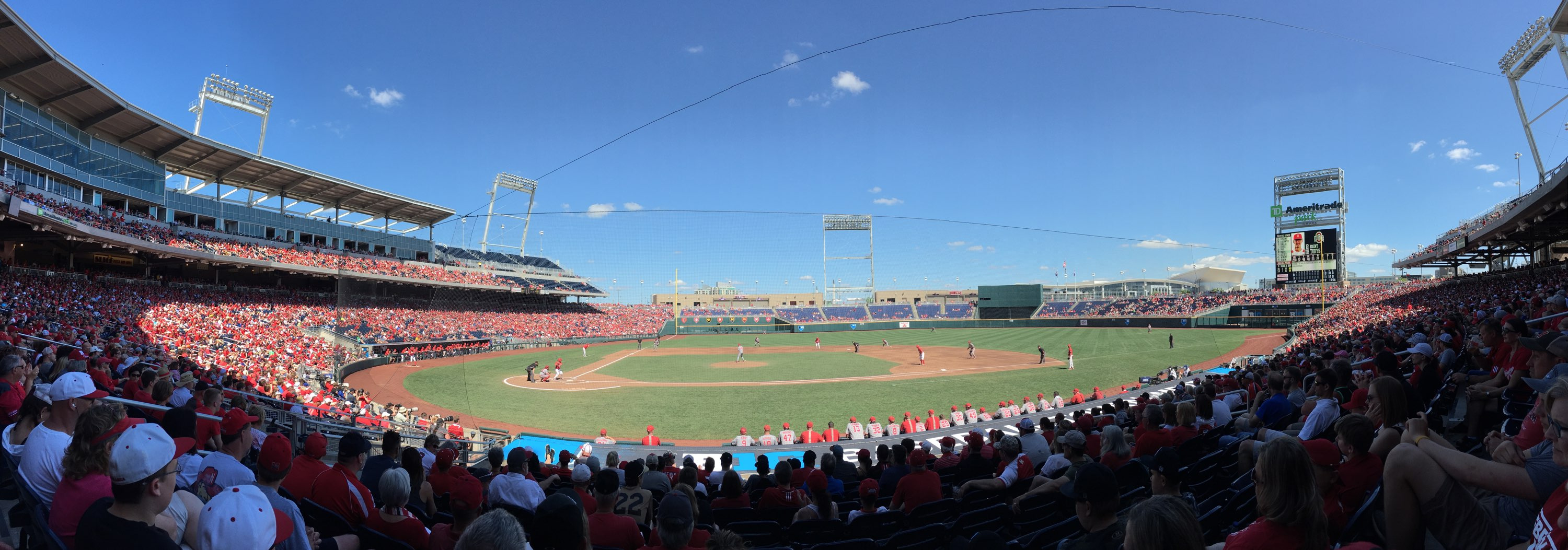
Over 17,000 spectators filled TD Ameritrade to witness the 2019 Big Ten Championship Game
