= 2018 Purdue Boilermakers baseball team =

American college baseball season

2018 Purdue Boilermakers baseball

Chapel Hill Regional, L, 4–8 vs #21 Houston
- Conference: Big Ten Conference
- Record: 38–21 (17–6 Big Ten)
- Head coach: Mark Wasikowski (2nd season)
- Assistant coach: Greg Goff (1st season)
- Hitting coach: Wally Crancer (5th season)
- Pitching coach: Steve Holm (2nd season)
- Home stadium: Alexander Field

2018 Big Ten Conference baseball standings
	Conf.				Overall
Team	W		L	PCT	W		L	PCT
No. 15 Minnesota ‍†‍‡‍	18	–	4	.818	44	–	13	.772
No. 27 Purdue ‍‍‍	17	–	6	.739	38	–	21	.644
Michigan ‍‍‍	15	–	8	.652	33	–	21	.611
Illinois ‍‍‍	15	–	9	.625	33	–	20	.623
Indiana ‍‍‍	14	–	9	.609	40	–	19	.678
Iowa ‍‍‍	13	–	9	.591	33	–	20	.623
Ohio State ‍‍‍	14	–	10	.583	36	–	24	.600
Michigan State ‍‍‍	11	–	12	.478	20	–	32	.385
Maryland ‍‍‍	9	–	14	.391	24	–	30	.444
Nebraska ‍‍‍	8	–	14	.364	24	–	28	.462
Rutgers ‍‍‍	7	–	16	.304	25	–	25	.500
Northwestern ‍‍‍	6	–	18	.250	17	–	32	.347
Penn State ‍‍‍	3	–	21	.125	15	–	34	.306
‡ – Tournament champion As of June 24, 2023; Rankings from Collegiate Baseball

The 2018 Purdue Boilermakers baseball team was a baseball team that represented Purdue University in the 2018 NCAA Division I baseball season. The Boilermakers were members of the Big Ten Conference and played their home games at Alexander Field in West Lafayette, Indiana. They were led by second-year head coach Mark Wasikowski.

== Preseason ==
=== Previous season ===
In 2017, Purdue compiled a 29–27 record (12–12 in conference play) during the regular season, qualifying for a postseason for the first season since 2012. Purdue's 19 win improvement in 2017 from 2016 was the largest improvement in NCAA Division I baseball during the 2017 season.

=== Coaching staff changes ===
On July 20, 2017, Purdue hired Greg Goff to join the baseball team as a volunteer assistant, replacing Jack Marder who left for the same position with Stanford.

=== MLB draft ===
No Boilermakers on the 2017 roster were selected in the 2017 Major League Baseball draft.

=== Departed Players ===
The following Boilermakers on the 2017 roster departed the program prior to the 2018 season:

List of Departed Players
Name	2017 Class	Pos.	Reason
Drew Bertram	Freshman	U	Became student assistant coach at Purdue
Jack Dellinger	Freshman	RHP	Transferred to Chipola College
Adam Dressler	Senior	RHP	Graduated
Brian Ghiselli	Senior	RHP	Graduated
Hayden Grant	Senior	INF	Graduated
Stephen Kalina	RS Sophomore	INF	Departed
John LeGare	Freshman	OF	Departed
Alex Lyons	Senior	RHP	Graduated
Mike Madej	Freshman	INF	Transferred to Northwest Florida State College
Brice McDaniel	Freshman	INF	Departed
Logan Poisall	Junior	INF	Enrolled at Purdue, but did not play
Tanner Schumacher	RS Senior	RHP	Graduated
Kyle Schweiger	RS Junior	RHP	Departed
Ted Snidanko	Senior	OF	Graduated
Kyle Van Hoeck	Junior	LHP	Departed
Hunter Wolfe	Freshman	LHP	Transferred to Wabash Valley College

=== Recruiting class ===
The Boilermakers added the following players to the roster as part of their 2017 recruiting class:

List of 2017 Recruits
Name	2018 Class	Pos.	Previous School	Hometown
Ryan Beard	JR	LHP	College of Southern Idaho	Boise, Idaho
Trevor Cheaney	JR	RHP	Paris Junior College	Muenster, Texas
Nick Evarts	JR	INF	Weatherford College	Colleyville, Texas
Justin Fugitt	FR	INF	Hilliard Darby H. S.	Hilliard, Ohio
Braden Giroux	JR	OF	Wabash Valley College	Lafayette, Indiana
Bo Hofstra	FR	RHP	Illiana Christian H. S.	Schererville, Indiana
Owen Jansen	FR	INF	Iroquois Ridge H. S.	Oakville, Ontario
Trent Johnson	FR	RHP	Crawfordsville H. S.	Crawfordsville, Indiana
Charlie Nasuti	FR	OF	St. John Bosco H. S.	Long Beach, California
Ben Nisle	FR	OF	Lake Central H. S.	Schererville, Indiana
Tyler Powers	FR	INF	Lafayette Central Catholics Jr/Sr H. S.	Lafayette, Indiana
Patrick J. Smith	FR	LHP	James B. Conant H. S.	Schaumburg, Illinois
Patrick W. Smith	FR	OF	Oak Ridge H. S.	El Dorado Hills, California
Alec West-Guillen	JR	LHP	College of Southern Idaho	Reno, Nevada
Hayden Wynja	FR	LHP	Heritage Christian School	Indianapolis, Indiana

== Roster ==
2018 Purdue Boilermakers baseball team
Players
Coaches

#	Pos.	Name	B/T	Height	Weight	Year	Previous school	Home town
1	INF	Owen Jansen	L/R	5 ft 11 in (1.8 m)	190 lb (86 kg)	Fr	Iroquois Ridge H. S.	Oakville, Ontario
2	INF	Tyler Powers	R/R	5 ft 9 in (1.75 m)	155 lb (70 kg)	Fr	Lafayette Central Catholics Jr/Sr H. S.	Lafayette, Indiana
4	OF	Skyler Hunter	S/R	5 ft 10 in (1.78 m)	185 lb (84 kg)	So	Hood River Valley H. S.	Hood River, Oregon
5	INF	Harry Shipley	L/R	5 ft 9 in (1.75 m)	165 lb (75 kg)	Sr	Cathedral H. S.	Fishers, Indiana
6	INF	Evan Warden	R/R	5 ft 10 in (1.78 m)	165 lb (75 kg)	RS Jr	Western H. S.	Kokomo, Indiana
9	C	Nick Dalesandro	R/R	6 ft 1 in (1.85 m)	175 lb (79 kg)	Jr	Joliet Catholic Academy	Plainfield, Illinois
10	LHP	Alec West-Guillen	L/L	6 ft 0 in (1.83 m)	190 lb (86 kg)	Jr	College of Southern Idaho	Reno, Nevada
11	OF	Alec Olund	R/R	6 ft 1.5 in (1.87 m)	200 lb (91 kg)	Sr	Lake Central H. S.	Crown Point, Indiana
13	RHP	Tanner Andrews	R/R	6 ft 3 in (1.91 m)	220 lb (100 kg)	Sr	Tippecanoe Valley H. S.	Rochester, Indiana
15	INF	Evan Kennedy	L/R	6 ft 2.5 in (1.89 m)	213 lb (97 kg)	Sr	Lafayette Central Catholics Jr/Sr H. S.	Lafayette, Indiana
16	RHP	Trevor Cheaney	R/R	6 ft 2 in (1.88 m)	200 lb (91 kg)	Jr	Paris Junior College	Muenster, Texas
18	INF	Nick Evarts	R/R	5 ft 11 in (1.8 m)	185 lb (84 kg)	Jr	Weatherford College	Colleyville, Texas
19	INF	Justin Fugitt	L/R	6 ft 1 in (1.85 m)	175 lb (79 kg)	Fr	Hilliard Darby H. S.	Hilliard, Ohio
21	RHP	Mike Kornacker	R/R	6 ft 3.5 in (1.92 m)	213 lb (97 kg)	RS Jr	St. Laurence H. S.	Lemont, Illinois
22	C	Bryce Bonner	R/R	5 ft 9 in (1.75 m)	180 lb (82 kg)	So	Jesuit College Preparatory School of Dallas	Katy, Texas
23	OF	Charlie Nasuti	R/R	5 ft 11 in (1.8 m)	175 lb (79 kg)	Fr	St. John Bosco H. S.	Long Beach, California
25	OF	Milo Beam	L/L	6 ft 3 in (1.91 m)	170 lb (77 kg)	So	Westfield H. S.	Westfield, Indiana
26	LHP	Ross Learnard	R/L	6 ft 2 in (1.88 m)	180 lb (82 kg)	Sr	Parkland College	Catlin, Illinois
27	INF	Jacson McGowan	R/R	6 ft 2.5 in (1.89 m)	212 lb (96 kg)	Jr	Brownsburg H. S.	Brownsburg, Indiana
30	LHP	Patrick J. Smith	L/L	6 ft 2 in (1.88 m)	215 lb (98 kg)	Jr	Heartland Community College	Schaumburg, Illinois
31	RHP	Cameron Williams	R/R	6 ft 7 in (2.01 m)	221 lb (100 kg)	Sr	Angelina College	Seabrook, Texas
32	LHP	Gareth Stroh	L/L	6 ft 1 in (1.85 m)	200 lb (91 kg)	Jr	Coffeyville Community College	Kearney, Nebraska
34	RHP	Andrew Bohm	R/R	6 ft 1.5 in (1.87 m)	227 lb (103 kg)	RS Fr	Hamilton Southeastern H. S.	Fishers, Indiana
35	OF	Ben Nisle	R/R	6 ft 2 in (1.88 m)	200 lb (91 kg)	Fr	Lake Central H. S.	Schererville, Indiana
36	RHP	Trent Johnson	R/R	6 ft 2 in (1.88 m)	190 lb (86 kg)	Fr	Crawfordsville H. S.	Crawfordsville, Indiana
37	LHP	Ryan Beard	L/L	6 ft 4 in (1.93 m)	215 lb (98 kg)	Jr	College of Southern Idaho	Boise, Idaho
40	RHP	Dalton Parker	R/R	6 ft 4 in (1.93 m)	216 lb (98 kg)	So	St. Joseph-Ogden H. S.	St. Joseph, Illinois
41	OF	Patrick W. Smith	L/R	5 ft 11 in (1.8 m)	175 lb (79 kg)	Fr	Oak Ridge H. S.	El Dorado Hills, California
42	LHP	Matt Moore	L/L	6 ft 3 in (1.91 m)	219 lb (99 kg)	RS Fr	Avon H. S.	Avon, Indiana
43	LHP	Hayden Wynja	L/L	6 ft 8 in (2.03 m)	200 lb (91 kg)	Fr	Heritage Christian School	Indianapolis, Indiana
45	OF	Braden Giroux	L/L	6 ft 0 in (1.83 m)	175 lb (79 kg)	Jr	Wabash Valley College	Lafayette, Indiana
48	RHP	Bo Hofstra	R/R	6 ft 5 in (1.96 m)	238 lb (108 kg)	Fr	Illiana Christian H. S.	Schererville, Indiana

Head coach

44 Mark Wasikowski

Assistant coach(es)

39 Greg Goff

Hitting coach(es)

7 Wally Crancer

Pitching coach(es)

20 Steve Holm

Legend

- (C) Team captain
- (S) Suspended
- (I) Ineligible
- Injured
- Current redshirt

Roster
Last update: May 18, 2018

== Schedule ==
2018 Purdue Boilermakers baseball game log
Regular season
February

#	Date	Opponent	Site/stadium	Score	Win	Loss	Save	Attendance	Overall record	B1G record
1	February 16	at Baylor	Baylor Ballpark • Waco, Texas	Cancelled	–	–	–	–	0–0	–
2	February 17	vs Western Michigan	Perfect Game Park • Emerson, Georgia	5–1	Andrews (1–0)	Szott (0–1)	Learnard (1)	-	1–0	–
3	February 17	vs Western Michigan	Perfect Game Park • Emerson, Georgia	5–1	Wojtysiak (1–0)	Laio (0–1)	None	210	2–0	–
4	February 17	at Baylor	Baylor Ballpark • Waco, Texas	Cancelled	–	–	–	–	2–0	–
5	February 18	vs Western Michigan	Perfect Game Park • Emerson, Georgia	10–4	Hofstra (1–0)	Townsend-Chase (0–1)	None	221	3–0	–
6	February 18	at Baylor	Baylor Ballpark • Waco, Texas	Cancelled	–	–	–	–	3–0	–
7	February 23	vs Saint Louis	Nelson W. Wolff Municipal Stadium • San Antonio, Texas	5–2	Stroh (1–0)	Wark (1–1)	Hofstra (1)	198	4–0	–
8	February 23	vs Incarnate Word	Nelson W. Wolff Municipal Stadium • San Antonio, Texas	5–4	Cheaney (1–0)	Schull (1–1)	None	456	5–0	–
9	February 24	vs #30 Notre Dame	Nelson W. Wolff Municipal Stadium • San Antonio, Texas	2–4	Vail (1–0)	Learnard (0–1)	None	222	5–1	–
10	February 25	vs #30 Notre Dame	Nelson W. Wolff Municipal Stadium • San Antonio, Texas	8–7	Williams (1–0)	Combs (0–1)	None	443	6–1	–

March

#	Date	Opponent	Site/stadium	Score	Win	Loss	Save	Attendance	Overall record	B1G record
11	March 2	vs Central Michigan	Melching Field at Conrad Park • DeLand, Florida	11–1	Stroh (2–0)	Brettell (1–2)	None	-	7–1	–
12	March 3	vs Virginia Tech	Melching Field at Conrad Park • DeLand, Florida	12–5	Andrews (2–0)	Seymour (1–1)	None	386	8–1	–
13	March 4	at Stetson	Melching Field at Conrad Park • DeLand, Florida	6–11	Onyshko (2–0)	Kornacker (0–1)	Wilson (5)	902	8–2	–
14	March 9	at Tulane	Greer Field at Turchin Stadium • New Orleans, Louisiana	0–1	Roper (1–2)	Andrews (2–1)	Bjorngjeld (1)	1,648	8–3	–
15	March 10	at Tulane	Greer Field at Turchin Stadium • New Orleans, Louisiana	12–8	Williams (2–0)	Massey (1–2)	None	1,654	9–3	–
16	March 11	at Tulane	Greer Field at Turchin Stadium • New Orleans, Louisiana	2–6	Gillies (2–1)	Hofstra (1–1)	None	1,582	9–4	–
17	March 13	at Southeastern Louisiana	Pat Kenelly Diamond at Alumni Field • Hammond, Louisiana	0–4	Knopp (1–1)	Johnson (0–1)	None	1,422	9–5	–
18	March 14	at Nicholls State	Ben Meyer Diamond at Ray E. Didier Field • Thibodaux, Louisiana	2–4	Taylor (1–1)	Beard (0–1)	Hatcher (1)	312	9–6	–
19	March 17	at Saint Louis	Billiken Sports Center • Saint Louis, Missouri	1–15	Hogan (3–1)	Andrews (2–2)	None	-	9–7	–
20	March 17	at Saint Louis	Billiken Sports Center • Saint Louis, Missouri	9–11	Sommerfeld (1–0)	Williams (2–1)	None	173	9–8	–
21	March 18	at Saint Louis	Billiken Sports Center • Saint Louis, Missouri	3–7	Reveno (3–1)	Hofstra (1–2)	None	117	9–9	–
22	March 23	Lipscomb	Alexander Field • West Lafayette, Indiana	1–3	Dorso (1–1)	Andrews (2–3)	Knox (3)	–	9–10	–
23	March 23	Lipscomb	Alexander Field • West Lafayette, Indiana	6–2	Stroh (3–0)	Kachmar (1–1)	None	843	10–10	–
24	March 25	Lipscomb	Alexander Field • West Lafayette, Indiana	Cancelled	–	–	–	–	10–10	–
25	March 28	Valparaiso	Alexander Field • West Lafayette, Indiana	4–1	Beard (1–1)	Hammel (1–1)	Learnard (2)	912	11–10	–
26	March 30	at Penn State	Medlar Field • University Park, Pennsylvania	3–2	Andrews (3–3)	Hagenman (2–3)	Learnard (3)	638	12–10	1–0
27	March 31	at Penn State	Medlar Field • University Park, Pennsylvania	6–3	Stroh (4–0)	Lehman (2–3)	Cheaney (1)	–	13–10	2–0
28	March 31	at Penn State	Medlar Field • University Park, Pennsylvania	9–0	Johnson (1–1)	Biasi (1–3)	None	1,002	14–10	3–0

April

#	Date	Opponent	Site/stadium	Score	Win	Loss	Save	Attendance	Overall record	B1G record
29	April 3	Oakland	Alexander Field • West Lafayette, Indiana	Cancelled	–	–	–	–	14–10	3–0
30	April 4	Oakland	Alexander Field • West Lafayette, Indiana	Cancelled	–	–	–	–	14–10	3–0
31	April 6	at #10 Indiana	Bart Kaufman Field • Bloomington, Indiana	4–2	Learnard (1–1)	Krueger (1–3)	None	1,714	15–10	4–0
32	April 7	at #10 Indiana	Bart Kaufman Field • Bloomington, Indiana	1–14	Milto (5–2)	Stroh (4–1)	None	2,190	15–11	4–1
33	April 8	at #10 Indiana	Bart Kaufman Field • Bloomington, Indiana	5–7	Lloyd (2–0)	Williams (2–2)	None	2,265	15–12	4–2
34	April 10	Ball State	Alexander Field • West Lafayette, Indiana	0–2	Floyd (4–0)	Beard (1–2)	Freed (2)	735	15–13	4–2
35	April 13	Minnesota	Alexander Field • West Lafayette, Indiana	7–22	Schulze (7–0)	Hofstra (1–3)	None	1,280	15–14	4–3
36	April 14	Minnesota	Alexander Field • West Lafayette, Indiana	8–18	Lackney (2–2)	Stroh (4–2)	None	1,378	15–15	4–4
37	April 15	Minnesota	Alexander Field • West Lafayette, Indiana	Cancelled	–	–	–	–	15–15	4–4
38	April 17	Indiana State	Bob Warn Field at Sycamore Stadium • Terre Haute, Indiana	3–1	Learnard (2–1)	Larrison (1–3)	None	436	16–15	4–4
39	April 18	at Indiana State	Alexander Field • West Lafayette, Indiana	1–2	Rivers (1–0)	Beard (1–3)	Grauer (2)	824	16–16	4–4
40	April 20	at Maryland	Shipley Field • College Park, Maryland	7–1	Andrews (4–3)	DiLuia (1–3)	Learnard (4)	926	17–16	5–4
41	April 21	at Maryland	Shipley Field • College Park, Maryland	4–3	Parker (1–0)	Biondic (2–1)	Learnard (5)	846	18–16	6–4
42	April 22	at Maryland	Shipley Field • College Park, Maryland	8–6	Hofstra (2–3)	Burleson (0–1)	Learnard (6)	992	19–16	7–4
43	April 24	Chicago State	Alexander Field • West Lafayette, Indiana	8–1	Bohm (1–0)	Kaplan (0–2)	None	652	20–16	7–4
44	April 25	#15 Indiana	Alexander Field • West Lafayette, Indiana	5–3	Beard (2–3)	Manous (1–1)	Learnard (7)	2,369	21–16	7–4
45	April 27	Rutgers	Alexander Field • West Lafayette, Indiana	4–0	Andrews (5–3)	O'Reilly (5–2)	None	1,194	22–16	8–4
46	April 28	Rutgers	Alexander Field • West Lafayette, Indiana	9–4	Stroh (5–2)	Rutkowski (4–4)	None	1,242	23–16	9–4
47	April 29	Rutgers	Alexander Field • West Lafayette, Indiana	1–0	Johnson (2–1)	Blum (0–3)	Learnard (8)	1,012	24–16	10–4

May

#	Date	Opponent	Site/stadium	Score	Win	Loss	Save	Attendance	Overall record	B1G record
48	May 4	Northwestern	Alexander Field • West Lafayette, Indiana	8–7	Hofstra (3–3)	Fordon (1–6)	Learnard (9)	1,324	25–16	11–4
49	May 5	Northwestern	Alexander Field • West Lafayette, Indiana	9–5	Parker (2–0)	Christie (2–5)	Learnard (10)	1,121	26–16	12–4
50	May 6	Northwestern	Alexander Field • West Lafayette, Indiana	9–2	Beard (3–3)	Bader (1–3)	None	1,272	27–16	13–4
51	May 8	Fort Wayne	Alexander Field • West Lafayette, Indiana	27–3	Bohm (2–0)	Odzark (1–6)	Kornacker (1)	1,230	28–16	13–4
52	May 9	at Ball State	Ball Diamond • Muncie, Indiana	10–8	Beard (4–3)	Floyd (5–1)	Learnard (11)	307	29–16	13–4
53	May 11	at Ohio State	Bill Davis Stadium • Columbus, Ohio	2–4	Curlis (7–3)	Andrews (5–4)	Kinker (12)	1,895	29–17	13–5
54	May 12	at Ohio State	Bill Davis Stadium • Columbus, Ohio	8–2	Parker (3–0)	Feltner (4–4)	Moore (1)	1,305	30–17	14–5
55	May 13	at Ohio State	Bill Davis Stadium • Columbus, Ohio	6–16	Woodby (4–0)	Cheaney (1–1)	Kinker (13)	1,058	30–18	14–6
56	May 15	Oral Roberts	Alexander Field • West Lafayette, Indiana	7–6	Parker (4–0)	Womacks (3–1)	Learnard (12)	811	31–18	14–6
57	May 17	#17 Michigan	Alexander Field • West Lafayette, Indiana	3–0	Andrews (6–4)	Henry (7–3)	Learnard (13)	1,650	32–18	15–6
58	May 18	#17 Michigan	Alexander Field • West Lafayette, Indiana	6–3	Hofstra (4–3)	Vancena (3–4)	Learnard (14)	1,292	33–18	16–6
59	May 19	#17 Michigan	Alexander Field • West Lafayette, Indiana	2–1	Beard (5–3)	Kauffmann (6–3)	Learnard (15)	1,868	34–18	17–6

Postseason
B1G Tournament

#	Date	Opponent	Site/stadium	Score	Win	Loss	Save	Attendance	Overall record	B1G record
60	May 23	vs Ohio State	TD Ameritrade Park Omaha • Omaha, Nebraska	8–2	Andrews (7–4)	Curlis (7–4)	None	–	35–18	17–6
61	May 24	vs Michigan	TD Ameritrade Park Omaha • Omaha, Nebraska	5–4	Parker (5–0)	Tribucher (4–4)	None	–	36–18	17–6
62	May 26	vs Illinois	TD Ameritrade Park Omaha • Omaha, Nebraska	11–5	Hofstra (5–3)	Schmidt (2–3)	None	–	37–18	17–6
63	May 27	vs #15 Minnesota	TD Ameritrade Park Omaha • Omaha, Nebraska	4–6	Thoresen (2–2)	Cheaney (1–2)	Meyer (16)	1,931	37–19	17–6

Chapel Hill Regional

#	Date	Opponent	Site/stadium	Score	Win	Loss	Save	Attendance	Overall record	B1G record
64	June 1	vs #21 Houston	Boshamer Stadium • Chapel Hill, North Carolina	1–9	Fletcher (7–3)	Andrews (7–5)	None	1,867	37–20	17–6
65	June 2	vs North Carolina A&T	Boshamer Stadium • Chapel Hill, North Carolina	14–4	Johnson (3–1)	Johnson (7–2)	None	1,858	38–20	17–6
66	June 3	vs #21 Houston	Boshamer Stadium • Chapel Hill, North Carolina	4–8	Puldio (6–2)	Learnard (2–2)	None	1,753	38–21	17–6

== Rankings ==
Ranking movements Legend: ██ Increase in ranking ██ Decrease in ranking — = Not ranked RV = Received votes
	Week																		
Poll	Pre	1	2	3	4	5	6	7	8	9	10	11	12	13	14	15	16	17	Final
Coaches'	—	—*	—	—	—	—	—	—	—	—	—	—	—	—	RV	RV	—	—	—
Baseball America	—	—	—	—	—	—	—	—	—	—	—	—	—	—	—	—	—	—	—
Collegiate Baseball^	—	—	—	—	—	—	—	—	—	—	—	—	—	—	27	27	—	—	—
NCBWA†	—	—	—	—	—	—	—	—	—	—	—	—	—	—	RV	RV	—	—	—

^ Collegiate Baseball ranked 40 teams in their preseason poll, but only ranked 30 teams weekly during the season.
† NCBWA ranks 30 teams in their preseason poll, but only ranks 25 teams weekly during the season.
* A new poll was not released for this week, so for comparison purposes, the previous week's ranking is inserted in this week's slot.

== Awards and honors ==
=== Weekly awards ===
Weekly Awards
Player	Award	Date Awarded	Ref.
Jacson McGowan	Big Ten Player of the Week	February 19, 2018	
Bo Hofstra	Big Ten Freshman of the Week	February 26, 2017	
Ross Learnard	Big Ten Pitcher of the Week	April 23, 2018	
Nick Dalesandro	Big Ten Player of the Week	April 30, 2018	

=== Conference awards ===
Awards
Player	Award	Date Awarded	Ref.
Nick Dalesandro	Third team All-Big Ten	May 22, 2018	
Jacson McGowan	Third team All-Big Ten	May 22, 2018	
Tanner Andrews	Third team All-Big Ten	May 22, 2018	
Ross Learnard	Third team All-Big Ten	May 22, 2018	
Ben Nisle	Freshman team All-Big Ten	May 22, 2018	
Trent Johnson	Freshman team All-Big Ten	May 22, 2018	
Tanner Andrews	Purdue's Sportsmanship Award	May 22, 2018	

=== National awards ===
Awards
Player	Award	Date Awarded	Ref.
Ben Nisle	Collegiate Baseball Freshman All-American	June 6, 2018	
