= 2018 Illinois Fighting Illini baseball team =

American college baseball season

2018 Illinois Fighting Illini baseball
- Conference: Big Ten Conference
- Record: 33–20 (15–9 Big Ten)
- Head coach: Dan Hartleb (13th season)
- Hitting coach: Adam Christ (3rd season)
- Pitching coach: Drew Dickinson (7th season)
- Home stadium: Illinois Field

2018 Big Ten Conference baseball standings
	Conf.				Overall
Team	W		L	PCT	W		L	PCT
No. 15 Minnesota ‍†‍‡‍	18	–	4	.818	44	–	13	.772
No. 27 Purdue ‍‍‍	17	–	6	.739	38	–	21	.644
Michigan ‍‍‍	15	–	8	.652	33	–	21	.611
Illinois ‍‍‍	15	–	9	.625	33	–	20	.623
Indiana ‍‍‍	14	–	9	.609	40	–	19	.678
Iowa ‍‍‍	13	–	9	.591	33	–	20	.623
Ohio State ‍‍‍	14	–	10	.583	36	–	24	.600
Michigan State ‍‍‍	11	–	12	.478	20	–	32	.385
Maryland ‍‍‍	9	–	14	.391	24	–	30	.444
Nebraska ‍‍‍	8	–	14	.364	24	–	28	.462
Rutgers ‍‍‍	7	–	16	.304	25	–	25	.500
Northwestern ‍‍‍	6	–	18	.250	17	–	32	.347
Penn State ‍‍‍	3	–	21	.125	15	–	34	.306
‡ – Tournament champion As of June 24, 2023; Rankings from Collegiate Baseball

The 2018 Illinois Fighting Illini baseball team represented the University of Illinois during the 2018 NCAA Division I baseball season. The Fighting Illini played their home games at Illinois Field as a member of the Big Ten Conference. They were led by head coach Dan Hartleb, in his 13th season at Illinois.

== Personnel ==
=== Roster ===
2018 Illinois Fighting Illini roster
Pitchers: 2 – Jimmy Burnette – Freshman; 7 – Ty Weber – Sophomore; 13 – Ryan Schmitt – Sophomore; 16 – Luke Shilling – Junior; 19 – Ryan Kutt – Freshman; 21 – Zak Devermann – Junior; 22 – Cyrillo Watson – Sophomore; 29 – Jackson Douglas – Senior; 33 – Quinn Snarskis – Junior; 34 – Zack Jones – Sophomore; 35 – Joey Gerber – Junior; 38 – Andy Fisher – RS-Junior; 43 – Sean Leland – RS-Junior; 44 – Quinten Sefcik – RS-Junior; 45 – Ryan Thompson – Sophomore	Catchers: 15 – David Craan – Junior; 18 – Kellen Sarver – Freshman; 25 – Mark Skonieczny – Senior; 32 – Jeff Korte – Junior; Infielders: 4 – Ben Troike – Sophomore; 6 – Michael Massey – Sophomore; 8 – Ryan Haff – RS-Junior; 9 – Bren Spillane – Junior; 12 – Michael Michalak – Junior; 23 – Tyler Engel – Junior; 27 – Grant Van Scoy – Junior; 31 – Casey Dodge – RS-Sophomore	Outfielders: 3 – Jack Yalowitz – Junior; 17 – Jeremiah Lebron – Freshman; 20 – Doran Turchin – Junior; 28 – Andrew Dyke – RS-Freshman; 38 – Zac Taylor – RS-Junior

=== Coaching staff ===
Name	Position	Seasons at Illinois	Alma mater
Dan Hartleb	Head coach	13	Southern Illinois University (1989)
Drew Dickinson	Pitching Coach	7	University of Illinois (2009)
Adam Christ	Hitting Coach	3	University of Wisconsin - Milwaukee (2003)
Casey Fletcher	Volunteer Assistant Coach	2	University of Illinois (2015)

== Rankings ==
Ranking movements Legend: ██ Increase in ranking ██ Decrease in ranking — = Not ranked RV = Received votes
	Week																		
Poll	Pre	1	2	3	4	5	6	7	8	9	10	11	12	13	14	15	16	17	Final
Coaches'	—	—*	—	—	—	—	—												
Baseball America	—	—	—	—	24	24	22												
Collegiate Baseball^	—	—	—	25	25	22	12	15											
NCBWA†	—	—	—	RV	RV	RV	25	RV											

^ Collegiate Baseball ranked 40 teams in their preseason poll, but only ranked 30 teams weekly during the season.
† NCBWA ranks 30 teams in their preseason poll, but only ranks 25 teams weekly during the season.
* A new poll was not released for this week, so for comparison purposes, the previous week's ranking is inserted in this week's slot.
