= 2018 Indiana Hoosiers baseball team =

American college baseball season

2018 Indiana Hoosiers baseball

Austin Regional, L 2–3 vs. Texas
- Conference: Big Ten Conference
- Record: 40–19 (14–9 Big Ten)
- Head coach: Chris Lemonis (4th season)
- Pitching coach: Kyle Bunn (4th season)
- Captains: Ryan Fineman; Pauly Milto
- Home stadium: Bart Kaufman Field (Capacity: 2,500)

2018 Big Ten Conference baseball standings
	Conf.				Overall
Team	W		L	PCT	W		L	PCT
No. 15 Minnesota ‍†‍‡‍	18	–	4	.818	44	–	13	.772
No. 27 Purdue ‍‍‍	17	–	6	.739	38	–	21	.644
Michigan ‍‍‍	15	–	8	.652	33	–	21	.611
Illinois ‍‍‍	15	–	9	.625	33	–	20	.623
Indiana ‍‍‍	14	–	9	.609	40	–	19	.678
Iowa ‍‍‍	13	–	9	.591	33	–	20	.623
Ohio State ‍‍‍	14	–	10	.583	36	–	24	.600
Michigan State ‍‍‍	11	–	12	.478	20	–	32	.385
Maryland ‍‍‍	9	–	14	.391	24	–	30	.444
Nebraska ‍‍‍	8	–	14	.364	24	–	28	.462
Rutgers ‍‍‍	7	–	16	.304	25	–	25	.500
Northwestern ‍‍‍	6	–	18	.250	17	–	32	.347
Penn State ‍‍‍	3	–	21	.125	15	–	34	.306
‡ – Tournament champion As of June 24, 2023; Rankings from Collegiate Baseball

The 2018 Indiana Hoosiers baseball team is a college baseball team that represented Indiana University in the 2018 NCAA Division I baseball season. The Hoosiers are members of the Big Ten Conference (B1G) and played their home games at Bart Kaufman Field in Bloomington, Indiana. They were led by fourth-year head coach Chris Lemonis.

Following the conclusion of the regular season, the Hoosiers were selected to play in the 2018 NCAA tournament, beginning in the Austin Regional. The Hoosiers would eventually lose in the final round of the Austin Regional to Texas by a score of 2–3.

== Previous season ==
The Hoosiers finished the 2017 NCAA Division I baseball season 34–24–2 overall (14–9–1 conference) and sixth place in conference standings. The Hoosiers were selected to play in the 2017 NCAA tournament, beginning in the Lexington Regional. The Hoosiers would eventually lose in the second round of the Lexington Regional to Kentucky by a score of 9–14.

=== MLB draft ===
The following Hoosiers on the 2017 roster were selected in the 2017 Major League Baseball draft:

List of Drafted Players
Name	2017 Class	Pos.	Team	Round	Signed/Returned
Craig Dedelow	Senior	OF	Chicago White Sox	9th	Signed*
Luke Miller	Sophomore	INF	Minnesota Twins	31st	Signed

* indicates draftee had no more college eligibility

== Preseason ==
On July 13, 2017, head coach Lemonis added former East Tennessee State Buccaneers assistant coach Zach Lucas to the same position for the Hoosiers. On December 12, 2017, Lemonis named junior catcher Ryan Fineman and junior right-handed pitcher Pauly Milto to Captain status for the 2018 year.

On December 19, 2017, Indiana University Athletics announced plans to install an LED video scoreboard, beyond the outfield wall. The size of the new scoreboard is estimated to be 26.8 feet (8.16 m) high by 48.7 (14.84 m) feet wide. Installation of the new scoreboard was completed prior to the start of the season.

=== Season projections ===
Coming off of an NCAA Regional appearance in 2017, the 2018 Hoosiers were projected to finish first in conference play by B1G coaches and projected to receive the conference's automatic bid to the 2018 NCAA Division I baseball tournament. The Hoosiers were ranked in four of the six major preseason polls and rankings, while receiving votes for ranking in the two others. The Hoosiers were ranked #17 by Perfect Game, #24 in the NCBWA Poll, #23 by D1 Baseball and #20 by Baseball America.

== Roster ==
2018 Indiana Hoosiers baseball team
Players
Coaches

#	Pos.	Name	B/T	Height	Weight	Year	Previous school	Home town
1	INF	Jeremy Houston	R/R	5 ft 8 in (1.73 m)	175 lb (79 kg)	So	Mount Carmel	Chicago, Illinois
2	INF	Cole Barr	R/R	5 ft 11 in (1.8 m)	191 lb (87 kg)	Fr	Yorktown High School	Yorktown, Indiana
4	INF	Cade Bunnell	L/R	6 ft 0 in (1.83 m)	182 lb (83 kg)	Jr	Stoughton High School	Stoughton, Wisconsin
6	RHP	Kade Kryzsko	R/R	6 ft 2 in (1.88 m)	185 lb (84 kg)	Sr	Kentwood	Kent, Washington
7	INF	Matt Gorski	R/R	6 ft 4 in (1.93 m)	195 lb (88 kg)	So	Hamilton Southeastern	Fishers, Indiana
8	INF	Luke Miller	R/R	6 ft 3 in (1.91 m)	184 lb (83 kg)	Jr	Cowen	Muncie, Indiana
9	LHP	Tim Herrin	L/L	6 ft 5 in (1.96 m)	212 lb (96 kg)	Jr	South Vigo	Terre Haute, Indiana
10	INF	Justin Walker	S/R	6 ft 0 in (1.83 m)	195 lb (88 kg)	Fr	Lafayette Jefferson	Lafayette, Indiana
12	LHP	B.J. Sabol	L/L	6 ft 1 in (1.85 m)	195 lb (88 kg)	Sr	Lake Country Lutheran	Hartland, Wisconsin
13	RHP	Cal Krueger	R/R	6 ft 0 in (1.83 m)	185 lb (84 kg)	So	Jasper	Jasper, Indiana
14	INF	Matt Lloyd	L/R	6 ft 1 in (1.85 m)	195 lb (88 kg)	Jr	Foothills Composite	Okotoks, Alberta, Canada
15	RHP	Pauly Milto	R/R	6 ft 3 in (1.91 m)	240 lb (109 kg)	Jr	Roncalli	Greenwood, Indiana
16	RHP	Austin Long	R/R	6 ft 3 in (1.91 m)	215 lb (98 kg)	Fr	Bedford North Lawrence	Bedford, Indiana
17	OF	Laren Eustace	L/L	5 ft 9 in (1.75 m)	175 lb (79 kg)	Sr	Batavia	Batavia, Illinois
19	LHP	Tommy Sommer	L/L	6 ft 4 in (1.93 m)	207 lb (94 kg)	Fr	Carmel	Carmel, Indiana
21	OF	Elijah Dunham	L/L	6 ft 0 in (1.83 m)	213 lb (97 kg)	Fr	FJ Ritz	Evansville, Indiana
23	LHP	Andrew Saalfrank	L/L	6 ft 3 in (1.91 m)	205 lb (93 kg)	So	Heritage	Hoagland, Indiana
26	OF	Chris Lowe	R/R	6 ft 2 in (1.88 m)	197 lb (89 kg)	Sr	Poway	Poway, California
27	RHP	Connor Manous	R/R	6 ft 0 in (1.83 m)	181 lb (82 kg)	Fr	Munster	Munster, Indiana
28	INF	Pat Loeffler	L/R	6 ft 1 in (1.85 m)	195 lb (88 kg)	So	Stevenson	Vernon Hills, Illinois
29	C	Ryan Fineman	R/R	6 ft 0 in (1.83 m)	215 lb (98 kg)	Jr	Agoura	Westlake Village, California
30	INF	Scotty Bradley	L/R	6 ft 2 in (1.88 m)	221 lb (100 kg)	So	Hopewell Valley Central	Pennington, New Jersey
31	C	Drew Ashley	R/R	5 ft 11 in (1.8 m)	170 lb (77 kg)	Fr	Evansville Memorial	Chandler, Indiana
33	C	Wyatt Cross	L/R	6 ft 3 in (1.91 m)	201 lb (91 kg)	Jr	Legacy	Broomfield, Colorado
34	RHP	Jonathan Stiever	R/R	6 ft 1 in (1.85 m)	188 lb (85 kg)	Jr	Cedarburg	Cedarburg, Wisconsin
35	RHP	Matt Litwicki	R/R	6 ft 1 in (1.85 m)	201 lb (91 kg)	Fr	Lake Central	Dyer, Indiana
36	INF	Colby Stratten	R/R	6 ft 1 in (1.85 m)	165 lb (75 kg)	Sr	Bloomington North	Bloomington, Indiana
37	LHP	Nick Eaton	L/L	6 ft 2 in (1.88 m)	195 lb (88 kg)	Fr	Cathedral	McCordsville, Indiana
39	OF	Sam Crail	L/R	5 ft 10 in (1.78 m)	192 lb (87 kg)	Fr	Sheridan	Sheridan, Indiana
40	RHP	Brian Hobbie	R/R	6 ft 4 in (1.93 m)	227 lb (103 kg)	Sr	Glenwood	Springfield, Illinois
41	INF	Caleb Balgaard	R/R	6 ft 3 in (1.91 m)	194 lb (88 kg)	Fr	Howell	Fenton Michigan
42	RHP	Grant Sloan	R/R	6 ft 4 in (1.93 m)	190 lb (86 kg)	So	Zionsville Community High School	Zionsville, Indiana
44	LHP	Cameron Beauchamp	L/L	6 ft 2 in (1.88 m)	205 lb (93 kg)	So	Peru High School	Peru, Indiana
51	OF	Logan Sowers	R/R	6 ft 5 in (1.96 m)	230 lb (104 kg)	Sr	McCutcheon	Lafayette, Indiana

Head coach

Chris Lemonis

Assistant coach(es)

Kyle Bunn

Legend

- (C) Team captain
- (S) Suspended
- (I) Ineligible
- Injured
- Current redshirt

Roster
Last update: February 14, 2018

== Schedule ==
Legend
Indiana win
Indiana loss
Postponement

2018 Indiana Hoosiers baseball game log
Regular season
February

#	Date	Opponent	Rank	Venue	Score	Overall record	B1G record
1	February 16	vs Oklahoma		Myrtle Beach, South Carolina (Brittain Resorts Baseball at the Beach)	3–6	0–1	–
2	February 17	vs Kansas State		Myrtle Beach, South Carolina (Brittain Resorts Baseball at the Beach)	5–0	1–1	–
3	February 18	vs South Alabama		Myrtle Beach, South Carolina (Brittain Resorts Baseball at the Beach)	8–4	2–1	–
4	February 19	vs Coastal Carolina		Conway, South Carolina (Brittain Resorts Baseball at the Beach)	6–5	3–1	–
5	February 23	vs Rutgers		Port Charlotte, Florida, (Snowbird Baseball Classic)	8–4	4–1	–
6	February 24	vs Boston College		Port Charlotte, Florida (Snowbird Baseball Classic)	4–0	5–1	–
7	February 25	vs Chicago State		Port Charlotte, Florida (Snowbird Baseball Classic)	7–2	6–1	–

March

#	Date	Opponent	Rank	Venue	Score	Overall record	B1G record
8	March 2	at San Diego	#22	Fowler Park • San Diego, California	10–4	7–1	–
9	March 3	at San Diego	#22	Fowler Park • San Diego, California	5–6	7–2	–
10	March 3	at San Diego	#22	Fowler Park • San Diego, California	6–5	8–2	–
11	March 4	at San Diego	#22	Fowler Park • San Diego, California	8–4	9–2	–
12	March 6	Cincinnati	#12	Bart Kaufman Field • Bloomington, Indiana	3–8	9–3	–
13	March 9	Pacific	#12	Bart Kaufman Field • Bloomington, Indiana	1–2	9–4	–
14	March 10	Pacific	#12	Bart Kaufman Field • Bloomington, Indiana	3–1	10–4	–
15	March 11	Pacific	#12	Bart Kaufman Field • Bloomington, Indiana	4–2	11–4	–
16	March 13	Western Illinois	#15	Bart Kaufman Field • Bloomington, Indiana	Cancelled	11–4	–
17	March 14	Western Illinois	#15	Bart Kaufman Field • Bloomington, Indiana	11–1	12–4	–
18	March 16	Northern Illinois	#15	Bart Kaufman Field • Bloomington, Indiana	18–0	13–4	–
19	March 17	Northern Illinois	#15	Bart Kaufman Field • Bloomington, Indiana	4–3	14–4	–
20	March 18	Northern Illinois	#15	Bart Kaufman Field • Bloomington, Indiana	4–3	15–4	–
21	March 21	Wright State	#14	Bart Kaufman Field • Bloomington, Indiana	Cancelled	15–4	–
22	March 23	at Iowa	#14	Duane Banks Field • Iowa City, Iowa	4–2	16–4	1–0
23	March 23	at Iowa	#14	Duane Banks Field • Iowa City, Iowa	1–5	16–5	1–1
24	March 25	at Iowa	#14	Duane Banks Field • Iowa City, Iowa	Cancelled	16–5	1–1
25	March 28	at Indiana State	#17	Bob Warn Field at Sycamore Stadium • Terre Haute, Indiana	5–3	17–5	1–1
25	March 30	Butler	#17	Bart Kaufman Field • Bloomington, Indiana	6–5	18–5	1–1
25	March 30	Butler	#17	Bart Kaufman Field • Bloomington, Indiana	13–0	19–5	1–1
25	March 31	Butler	#17	Bart Kaufman Field • Bloomington, Indiana	10–3	20–5	1–1

April

#	Date	Opponent	Rank	Venue	Score	Overall record	B1G record
26	April 3	at Ball State	#13	Ball Diamond • Muncie, Indiana	Cancelled	20–5	1–1
27	April 6	Purdue	#13	Bart Kaufman Field • Bloomington, Indiana	2–4	20–6	1–2
28	April 7	Purdue	#13	Bart Kaufman Field • Bloomington, Indiana	14–1	21–6	2–2
29	April 8	Purdue	#13	Bart Kaufman Field • Bloomington, Indiana	7–5	22–6	3–2
30	April 10	Indiana State	#15	Bart Kaufman Field • Bloomington, Indiana	6–1	23–6	3–2
31	April 13	Northwestern	#15	Bart Kaufman Field • Bloomington, Indiana	12–0	24–6	4–2
32	April 13	Northwestern	#15	Bart Kaufman Field • Bloomington, Indiana	6–3	25–6	5–2
33	April 15	Northwestern	#15	Bart Kaufman Field • Bloomington, Indiana	22–1	26–6	6–2
34	April 17	vs Notre Dame	#16	Victory Field • Indianapolis, Indiana	3–0	27–6	6–2
35	April 18	Ball State	#16	Bart Kaufman Field • Bloomington, Indiana	9–8	28–6	6–2
36	April 20	at Ohio State	#16	Bill Davis Stadium • Columbus, Ohio,	4–0	29–6	7–2
37	April 21	at Ohio State	#16	Bill Davis Stadium • Columbus, Ohio	4–5	29–7	7–3
38	April 22	at Ohio State	#16	Bill Davis Stadium • Columbus, Ohio	5–6	29–8	7–4
39	April 25	at Purdue	#27	Alexander Field • West Lafayette, Indiana	3–5	29–9	7–4
40	April 27	Illinois	#27	Bart Kaufman Field • Bloomington, Indiana	2–3	29–10	7–5
41	April 28	Illinois	#27	Bart Kaufman Field • Bloomington, Indiana	2–1	30–10	8–5
42	April 29	Illinois	#27	Bart Kaufman Field • Bloomington, Indiana	9–2	31–10	9–5

May

#	Date	Opponent	Rank	Venue	Score	Overall record	B1G record
44	May 4	at Minnesota		Siebert Field • Minneapolis, Minnesota,	1–4	31–11	9–6
45	May 5	at Minnesota		Siebert Field • Minneapolis, Minnesota	1–9	31–12	9–7
46	May 6	at Minnesota		Siebert Field • Minneapolis, Minnesota	6–7	31–13	9–8
47	May 8	Kentucky		Bart Kaufman Field • Bloomington, Indiana	6–7	31–14	9–8
48	May 11	at Nebraska		Haymarket Park • Lincoln, Nebraska,	2–5	31–15	9–9
49	May 12	at Nebraska		Haymarket Park • Lincoln, Nebraska	6–3	32–15	10–9
50	May 13	at Nebraska		Haymarket Park • Lincoln, Nebraska	8–6	33–15	11–9
51	May 15	Louisville		Jim Patterson Stadium • Louisville, Kentucky,	9–5	34–15	11–9
52	May 17	Maryland		Bart Kaufman Field • Bloomington, Indiana	6–5	35–15	12–9
53	May 18	Maryland		Bart Kaufman Field • Bloomington, Indiana	5–1	36–15	13–9
54	May 19	Maryland		Bart Kaufman Field • Bloomington, Indiana	5–1	37–15	14–9

Post-season
B1G Tournament

#	Date	Opponent	Venue	Score	Overall record	B1G record
55	May 23	Illinois	TD Ameritrade Park • Omaha, Nebraska,	1–7	37–16	14–9
56	May 24	Michigan State	TD Ameritrade Park • Omaha, Nebraska	6–5	38–16	14–9
57	May 25	Illinois	TD Ameritrade Park • Omaha, Nebraska	4–5	38–17	14–9

NCAA tournament

#	Date	Opponent	Venue	Score	Overall record	B1G record
58	June 1	Texas A&M	UFCU Disch–Falk Field • Austin, Texas,	3–10	38–18	14–9
59	June 2	Texas Southern	UFCU Disch–Falk Field • Austin, Texas	6–0	39–18	14–9
60	June 3	Texas A&M	UFCU Disch–Falk Field • Austin, Texas	9–7	40–18	14–9
61	June 3	Texas	UFCU Disch–Falk Field • Austin, Texas	2–3	40–19	14–9

"#" represents ranking. All rankings from Collegiate Baseball on the date of the contest.
"()" represents postseason seeding in the Big 10 Tournament or NCAA Regional, respectively.
Schedule Source

== Austin Regional ==
Austin Regional Teams
(1) Texas Longhorns	(2) Indiana Hoosiers	(3) Texas A&M Aggies	(4) Texas Southern Tigers

First round
1	Texas	10
4	Texas Southern	0
3	Texas A&M	10
2	Indiana	3
Lower round 1
4	Texas Southern	0
2	Indiana	6

Regional semifinals
1	Texas	8
3	Texas A&M	3
Lower final
3	Texas A&M	7
2	Indiana	9

Regional final
1	Texas	3
2	Indiana	2

- Austin Regional Scores Source

== Ranking movements ==
Ranking movements Legend: ██ Increase in ranking ██ Decrease in ranking — = Not ranked RV = Received votes
	Week																			
Poll	Pre	1	2	3	4	5	6	7	8	9	10	11	12	13	14	15	16	17	18	Final
Coaches'	RV	RV*	RV*	17	18	16	16	11	13	10	16	17	RV	RV	RV	RV	—			
Baseball America	20	20	20	18	18	19	18	16	16	12	18	18	—	—	—	—				
Collegiate Baseball^	RV	RV	22	12	15	14	17	13	15	16	27	RV	—	—	—	—				
NCBWA†	24	23	16	15	17	15	15	11	12	10	15	17	27	RV	28	—				

^ Collegiate Baseball ranked 40 teams in their preseason poll, but only ranked 30 teams weekly during the season.
† NCBWA ranks 30 teams in their preseason poll, but only ranks 25 teams weekly during the season.
* A new poll was not released for this week, so for comparison purposes, the previous week's ranking is inserted in this week's slot.

== Awards and honors ==
=== Pre-season awards / Watch list ===
Awards
Player	Award	Date awarded	Ref.
Matt Lloyd	Second team Pre-season All-American	February 5, 2018	
Ryan Fineman	Johnny Bench Award Watch List	March 7, 2018	

=== Regular season awards ===
Weekly Awards
Player	Award	Date awarded	Ref.
Pauly Milto	Big Ten Baseball Pitcher of the Week	February 26, 2018	
Matt Gorski	Big Ten Baseball Co-Players of the Week	March 6, 2018	
Elijah Dunham	Big Ten Freshman of the Week	March 6, 2018	
Jonathan Stiever	Big Ten Baseball Pitcher of the Week	March 19, 2018	
Luke Miller	Big Ten Player of the Week	May 21, 2018	

=== Conference awards ===
Awards
Player	Award	Date awarded	Ref.
Matt Gorski	First team All-Big Ten	May 22, 2018	
Jonathan Stiever	First team All-Big Ten	May 22, 2018	
Matt Lloyd	First team All-Big Ten	May 22, 2018	
Pauly Milto	Second team All-Big Ten	May 22, 2018	
Scott Bradley	Second team All-Big Ten	May 22, 2018	
Luke Miller	Third team All-Big Ten	May 22, 2018	
Logan Sowers	Third team All-Big Ten	May 22, 2018	
Drew Ashley	Freshman Team All-Big Ten	May 22, 2018	

== See also ==
- 2018 Big Ten Conference baseball tournament
- 2018 NCAA Division I baseball tournament
