= Bob "Turtle" Smith Stadium =

Baseball stadium at the University of Maryland

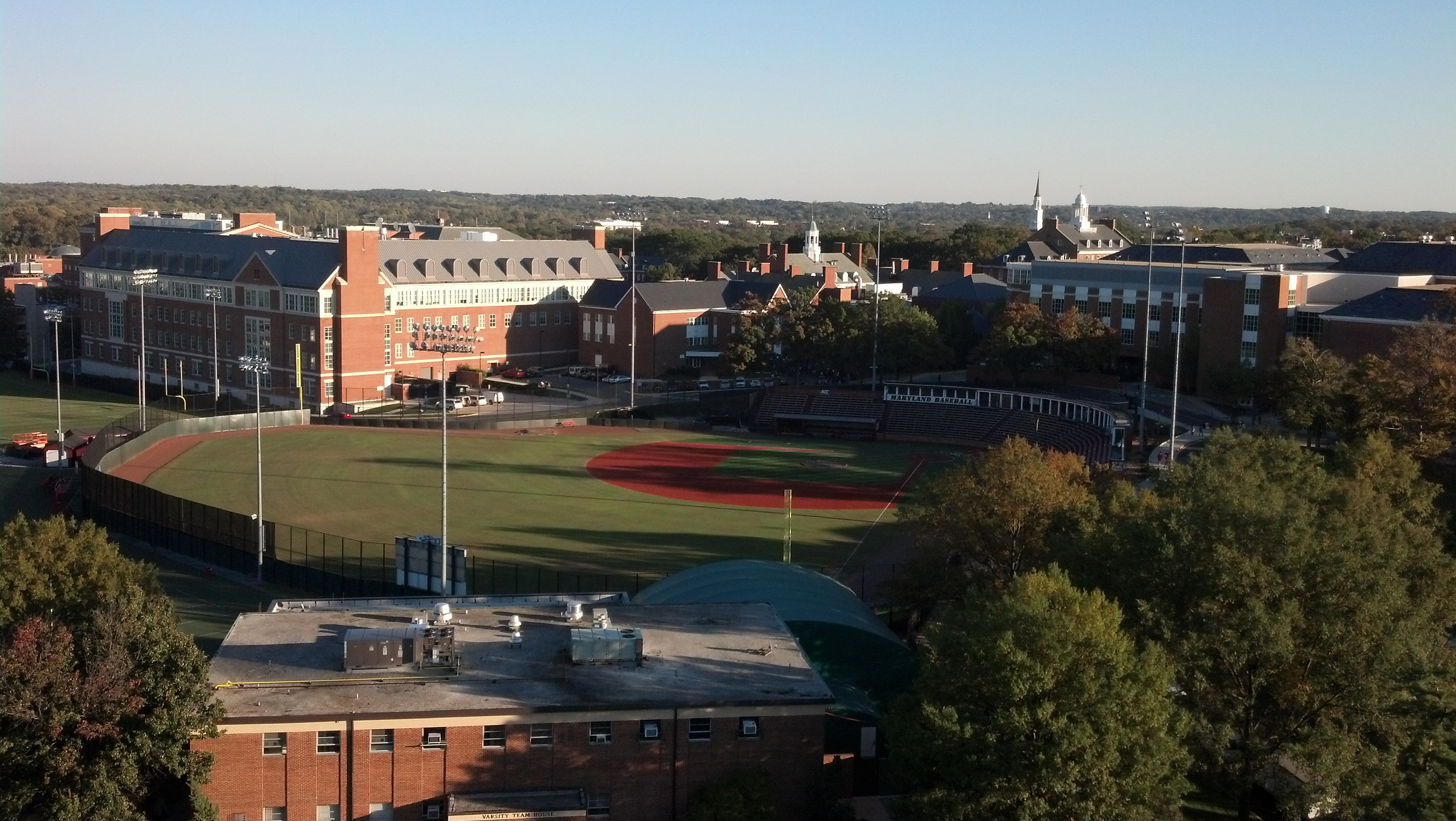
- Shipley Field, as viewed from Byrd Stadium, October 2013

- Location within Maryland Location within the United States
- Interactive map of Bob "Turtle" Smith Stadium
- Full name: Shipley Field at Bob "Turtle" Smith Stadium
- Former names: Shipley Field (1956–2009)
- Address: 4122 Fieldhouse Drive; College Park, Maryland
- Coordinates: 38°59′21″N 76°56′39″W
- Owner: University of Maryland, College Park
- Operator: University of Maryland, College Park
- Capacity: 2,500
- Type: Stadium
- Event: Baseball
- Surface: FieldTurf
- Scoreboard: Digital
- Field size: LF: 320 ft (97.5 m); CF: 385 ft (117.3 m); RF: 325 ft (99.1 m)

Construction
- Built: 1953–54
- Opened: April 3, 1954
- Renovated: 2004, 2015
- Cost: $40,000 (1954); $150,000 (2004)

Tenants
- Maryland Terrapins baseball (NCAA) 1954–present; Bowie Baysox (EL) 1994; College Park Bombers (CRSCBL) 2009

Website
- Official website

Shipley Field at Bob "Turtle" Smith Stadium is a baseball stadium in College Park, Maryland. It has served as the home field of the Maryland Terrapins baseball team at the University of Maryland since 1954. Shipley Field was formerly the home of the College Park Bombers of the Cal Ripken, Sr. Collegiate Baseball League, and was also used as a baseball venue by the Bowie Baysox during the 1994 season. The major league Washington Senators held a practice at Shipley Field on April 8, 1968, when their Opening Day game was postponed in the aftermath of the assassination of Martin Luther King Jr.

The stadium holds 2,500 people and opened on April 3, 1954. It was dedicated as Shipley Field to former Maryland baseball coach Burton Shipley on March 28, 1956. On May 8, 2010, it was re-dedicated as Bob "Turtle" Smith Stadium.

In 2004, a new artificial turf replaced an older turf installation in the stadium's infield, and improvements were made to the under field drainage system. After the 2015 season, the artificial turf infield and bermuda grass outfield were replaced with a FieldTurf surface; new drainage was installed underneath; a home team closed off bullpen was created in left field foul territory; both bullpens received FieldTurf surfaces; and the outfield wall was moved father out.

Between the 2026 and 2027 baseball seasons, the ballpark's dimensions will be adjusted in an effort to help Maryland's pitchers. The center field fence will be moved back 32 feet, from 385 feet to 417 feet. The 325-foot right-field fence will be moved back, while the 320-foot left-field wall will be shortened, but those new distances have not been announced.

== See also ==
- List of NCAA Division I baseball venues
