= 2019 Atlantic Coast Conference baseball tournament =

American college baseball tournament

- Teams: 12
- Format: See below
- Finals site: Durham Bulls Athletic Park; Durham, NC
- Champions: North Carolina (7th title)
- Winning coach: Mike Fox (3rd title)
- MVP: Michael Busch ((North Carolina))
- Television: ACC RSN's (Tues-Sat); ESPN2 (Championship)

2019 Atlantic Coast Conference baseball standings
	Conf.				Overall
Team	W		L	PCT	W		L	PCT
Atlantic
No. 3 Louisville ^{x}‍‍‍^{y}	21	–	9	.700	51	–	18	.739
NC State ‍‍‍^{y}	18	–	12	.600	42	–	19	.689
No. 8 Florida State ‍‍‍^{y}	17	–	13	.567	42	–	23	.646
Clemson ‍‍‍^{y}	15	–	15	.500	35	–	26	.574
Wake Forest ‍‍‍	14	–	16	.467	31	–	26	.544
Notre Dame ‍‍‍	13	–	17	.433	24	–	30	.444
Boston College ‍‍‍	12	–	18	.400	31	–	27	.534
Coastal
No. 17 Georgia Tech ^{x}‍‍‍^{y}	19	–	11	.633	43	–	19	.694
No. 19 Miami (FL) ‍‍‍^{y}	18	–	12	.600	41	–	20	.672
No. 15 North Carolina ‍‍‡‍^{y}	17	–	13	.567	46	–	19	.708
No. 16 Duke ‍‍‍^{y}	15	–	15	.500	35	–	27	.565
Virginia ‍‍‍	14	–	16	.467	32	–	24	.571
Virginia Tech ‍‍‍	9	–	21	.300	26	–	27	.491
Pittsburgh ‍‍‍	8	–	22	.267	21	–	34	.382
x – Division champion ‡ – Tournament champion y – Invited to the NCAA tournament As of June 27, 2019; Rankings from D1Baseball

The 2019 Atlantic Coast Conference baseball tournament was held from May 21 through 26 at Durham Bulls Athletic Park in Durham, North Carolina. The annual tournament determined the conference champion of the Division I Atlantic Coast Conference for college baseball. The tournament champion, North Carolina, received the league's automatic bid to the 2019 NCAA Division I baseball tournament. This was the last of 19 athletic championship events held by the conference in the 2018–19 academic year.

The tournament has been held every year but one since 1973, with Clemson winning ten championships, the most all-time. Georgia Tech has won nine championships, and defending champion Florida State has won eight titles since their entry to the league in 1992. Charter league member Duke, along with recent entrants Virginia Tech, Boston College, Pittsburgh, Notre Dame and Louisville have never won the event.

== Format and seeding ==
The winner of each seven team division and the top ten other teams based on conference winning percentage, regardless of division, from the conference's regular season were seeded one through twelve. Seeds one and two were awarded to the two division winners. Teams were then divided into four pools of three teams each, with the winners advancing to single elimination bracket for the championship.

If a 1–1 tie were to occur among all three teams in a pool, the highest seeded team would have advanced to the semifinals. Because of this, seeds 5–12 must win both pool play games to advance to the single-elimination bracket, and seeds 1–4 must only win the game against the winner of the game between the other two teams in the pool to advance. For example, if the 12 seed beats the 8 seed in the first game, then the winner of the 12 seed versus 1 seed advances, and the 8 seed versus 1 seed game has no effect on which team advances.

== Schedule and results ==
=== Schedule ===
Game	Time*	Matchup^{#}	Location	Television	Attendance	Reference
Tuesday, May 21
1	11:00 a.m.	No. 12 Boston College vs. No. 8 Clemson	Durham Bulls Athletic Park	ACC RSN's / ACCN Extra	2,490	
2	3:00 p.m.	No. 10 Wake Forest vs. No. 6 Florida State	Durham Bulls Athletic Park	ACC RSN's / ACCN Extra	2,490	
3	7:00 p.m.	No. 11 Notre Dame vs. No. 7 Duke	Durham Bulls Athletic Park	ACC RSN's / ACCN Extra	2,560	
Wednesday, May 22
4	11:00 a.m.	No. 1 Louisville vs. No. 12 Boston College	Durham Bulls Athletic Park	RSN / ACCN Extra	2,420	
5	3:00 p.m.	No. 2 Georgia Tech vs. No. 11 Notre Dame	Durham Bulls Athletic Park	RSN / ACCN Extra	2,420	
6	7:00 p.m.	No. 9 Virginia vs. No. 5 North Carolina	Durham Bulls Athletic Park	RSN / ACCN Extra	3,190	
Thursday, May 23
7	11:00 a.m.	No. 8 Clemson vs. No. 1 Louisville	Durham Bulls Athletic Park	RSN / ACCN Extra	2,577	
8	3:00 p.m.	No. 4 Miami vs. No. 9 Virginia	Durham Bulls Athletic Park	RSN / ACCN Extra	2,577	
9	7:00 p.m.	No. 3 NC State vs. No. 10 Wake Forest	Durham Bulls Athletic Park	RSN / ACCN Extra	4,318	
Friday, May 24
10	11:00 a.m.	No. 7 Duke vs. No. 2 Georgia Tech	Durham Bulls Athletic Park	RSN / ACCN Extra	4,067	
11	3:00 p.m.	No. 5 North Carolina vs. No. 4 Miami	Durham Bulls Athletic Park	RSN / ACCN Extra	4,067	
12	7:00 p.m.	No. 6 Florida State vs. No. 3 NC State	Durham Bulls Athletic Park	RSN / ACCN Extra	5,419	
Saturday, May 25
Semifinal 1	1:00 p.m.	No. 12 Boston College vs. No. 5 North Carolina	Durham Bulls Athletic Park	RSN / ACCN Extra	4,260	
Semifinal 2	5:00 p.m.	No. 2 Georgia Tech vs. No. 3 NC State	Durham Bulls Athletic Park	RSN / ACCN Extra	5,846	
Championship – Sunday, May 26
Championship	12:00 p.m.	No. 5 North Carolina vs. No. 2 Georgia Tech	Durham Bulls Athletic Park	ESPN2	5,627	
*Game times in EDT. # – Rankings denote tournament seed.

== Pool Play ==
=== Pool A ===
Pos	Team	Pld	W	L	RF	RA	RD	PCT	Qualification
1	Boston College	2	2	0	12	6	+6	1.000	Advance to Playoff round
2	Clemson	2	1	1	12	8	+4	.500	
3	Louisville	2	0	2	2	12	−10	.000	

Source: 247Sports

=== Pool B ===
Pos	Team	Pld	W	L	RF	RA	RD	PCT	Qualification
1	Georgia Tech	2	2	0	17	10	+7	1.000	Advance to Playoff round
2	Duke	2	1	1	14	11	+3	.500	
3	Notre Dame	2	0	2	12	22	−10	.000	

Source: 247Sports

=== Pool C ===
Pos	Team	Pld	W	L	RF	RA	RD	PCT	Qualification
1	NC State	2	1	1	6	16	−10	.500 (Note: NC State advances as the highest seed in the pool.)	Advance to Playoff round
2	Florida State	2	1	1	15	7	+8	.500	
3	Wake Forest	2	1	1	12	10	+2	.500	

Source: 247Sports

=== Pool D ===
Pos	Team	Pld	W	L	RF	RA	RD	PCT	Qualification
1	North Carolina	2	2	0	10	7	+3	1.000	Advance to Playoff round
2	Miami	2	1	1	15	10	+5	.500	
3	Virginia	2	0	2	6	12	−6	.000	

Source: 247Sports

== Final ==
Semifinals
12	Boston College	5
5	North Carolina	13
2	Georgia Tech	9
3	NC State	2

Finals
5	North Carolina	10
2	Georgia Tech	2

=== Championship Game ===
ACC Championship
(5) North Carolina Tar Heels	vs.	(2) Georgia Tech Yellow Jackets

May 26, 2019, 12:00 p.m. (EDT) at Durham Bulls Athletic Park in Durham, North Carolina
Team	1	2	3	4	5	6	7	8	9	R	H	E
(5) North Carolina	0	0	0	0	1	4	1	0	4	10	12	1
(2) Georgia Tech	0	0	1	0	0	0	0	0	1	2	4	0
WP: Hansen Butler (4–0) LP: Luke Bartnicki (2–2); Home runs: UNC: Aaron Sabato; Ashton McGee; Michael Busch; Brandon Martorano; GT: None; Attendance: 5,627

== All–Tournament Team ==
Position	Player	Team
C	Michael Rothenberg	Duke
1B	Micahel Busch (MVP)	North Carolina
2B	Cody Morissette	Boston College
3B	Ike Freeman	North Carolina
SS	Danny Serretti	North Carolina
OF	Joe Suozzi	Boston College
OF	Nick Wilhite	Georgia Tech
OF	J.C. Flowers	Florida State
DH	Michael Guldberg	Georgia Tech
P	Dan Metzdorf	Boston College
P	Mat Clark	Clemson
