= 2019 Miami Hurricanes baseball team =

American college baseball season

2019 Miami Hurricanes baseball

Starkville Regional, 2–2
- Conference: Atlantic Coast Conference
- Record: 41–20 (18–12 ACC)
- Head coach: Gino DiMare (1st season)
- Assistant coaches: J. D. Arteaga (17th season); Norberto Lopez (4th season); Bo Durkac (1st season)
- Home stadium: Alex Rodriguez Park at Mark Light Field

2019 Atlantic Coast Conference baseball standings
	Conf.				Overall
Team	W		L	PCT	W		L	PCT
Atlantic
No. 3 Louisville ^{x}‍‍‍^{y}	21	–	9	.700	51	–	18	.739
NC State ‍‍‍^{y}	18	–	12	.600	42	–	19	.689
No. 8 Florida State ‍‍‍^{y}	17	–	13	.567	42	–	23	.646
Clemson ‍‍‍^{y}	15	–	15	.500	35	–	26	.574
Wake Forest ‍‍‍	14	–	16	.467	31	–	26	.544
Notre Dame ‍‍‍	13	–	17	.433	24	–	30	.444
Boston College ‍‍‍	12	–	18	.400	31	–	27	.534
Coastal
No. 17 Georgia Tech ^{x}‍‍‍^{y}	19	–	11	.633	43	–	19	.694
No. 19 Miami (FL) ‍‍‍^{y}	18	–	12	.600	41	–	20	.672
No. 15 North Carolina ‍‍‡‍^{y}	17	–	13	.567	46	–	19	.708
No. 16 Duke ‍‍‍^{y}	15	–	15	.500	35	–	27	.565
Virginia ‍‍‍	14	–	16	.467	32	–	24	.571
Virginia Tech ‍‍‍	9	–	21	.300	26	–	27	.491
Pittsburgh ‍‍‍	8	–	22	.267	21	–	34	.382
x – Division champion ‡ – Tournament champion y – Invited to the NCAA tournament As of June 27, 2019; Rankings from D1Baseball

The 2019 Miami Hurricanes baseball team represented the University of Miami during the 2019 NCAA Division I baseball season. The Hurricanes played their home games at Alex Rodriguez Park at Mark Light Field as a member of the Atlantic Coast Conference. They are led by head coach Gino DiMare, in his 19th year at Miami and first year as the head coach.

== Roster ==
2019 Miami Hurricanes roster
Pitchers: 0 – Gregory Veliz – Junior; 7 – Chris McMahon – Sophomore; 10 – JP Gates Freshman; 14 – Evan McKendry – Junior; 17 – Joe Sparber – Sophomore; 19 – Mark Mixon – Junior; 21 – Slade Cecconi – Freshman; 22 – Albert Maury - (redshirt) Sophomore; 32 – Alex Ruiz – (redshirt) Freshman; 34 – Daniel Rivero – Junior; 36 – Jeremy Cook – Sophomore; 47 – Tyler Keysor – Junior; 53 – Brian Van Belle – (redshirt) Junior; 55 – Bailey Mantilla – Freshman; 99 – Daniel Federman – Junior	Catchers: 24 – Michael Amditis – (redshirt) Sophomore; 31 – Isaac Quinones – Sophomore; 44 – Adrian Del Castillo – Freshman; Infielders: 2 – Freddy Zamora – Sophomore; 9 – Willy Escala – Sophomore; 13 – Tyler Paige – Sophomore; 16 – Raymond Gil – Sophomore; 27 – Anthony Vilar – Freshman; 30 – Alex Toral – Sophomore; 40 – Austin Pollak – Freshman	Outfielders: 4 – Dylan Cloonan – Sophomore; 28 – Jordan Lala – Freshman; 35 – Chad Crosbie – Junior; 38 – Luis Tuero – Freshman; 41 – Chet Moore – Freshman; 43 – Gabe Rivera – Sophomore; 51 – Tony Jenkins – Sophomore

== Coaching staff ==
Name	Position	Seasons at Miami	Alma mater
Gino DiMare	Head coach	19	University of Miami (1992)
J. D. Arteaga	Assistant Coach	17	University of Miami (2002)
Norberto Lopez	Assistant Coach	4	Nova Southeastern University (1999)
Bo Durkac	Assistant Coach	1	Virginia Tech (1991)

== 2019 MLB draft ==
Player	Position	Round	Overall	MLB team
Evan McKendry	RHP	9	278	Tampa Bay Rays
Greg Veliz	RHP	15	451	Los Angeles Angels
Michael Amditis	C	21	640	Cleveland Indians
Mark Mixon	RHP	26	791	Los Angeles Dodgers
Tyler Keysor	RHP	40	1,213	Milwaukee Brewers
