= 2019 Florida State Seminoles baseball team =

American college baseball season

2019 Florida State Seminoles baseball

NCAA Athens Regional champion NCAA Baton Rouge Super Regional champion

College World Series, 1–2
- Conference: Atlantic Coast Conference
- Atlantic Division

Ranking
- Coaches: No. 7
- CB: No. 6
- Record: 42–23 (17–13 ACC)
- Head coach: Mike Martin (40th season)
- Assistant coaches: Mike Martin, Jr. (22nd season); Clyde Keller (4th season); Tyler Holt (1st season)
- Home stadium: Mike Martin Field at Dick Howser Stadium (Capacity: 6,700)

2019 Atlantic Coast Conference baseball standings
| | Conf. | | | | Overall |
| Team | W | | L | PCT | W | | L | PCT |
|---|---|---|---|---|---|---|---|---|
Atlantic
| No. 3 Louisville ^{x}‍‍‍^{y} | 21 | – | 9 | .700 | 51 | – | 18 | .739 |
| NC State ‍‍‍^{y} | 18 | – | 12 | .600 | 42 | – | 19 | .689 |
| No. 8 Florida State ‍‍‍^{y} | 17 | – | 13 | .567 | 42 | – | 23 | .646 |
| Clemson ‍‍‍^{y} | 15 | – | 15 | .500 | 35 | – | 26 | .574 |
| Wake Forest ‍‍‍ | 14 | – | 16 | .467 | 31 | – | 26 | .544 |
| Notre Dame ‍‍‍ | 13 | – | 17 | .433 | 24 | – | 30 | .444 |
| Boston College ‍‍‍ | 12 | – | 18 | .400 | 31 | – | 27 | .534 |
Coastal
| No. 17 Georgia Tech ^{x}‍‍‍^{y} | 19 | – | 11 | .633 | 43 | – | 19 | .694 |
| No. 19 Miami (FL) ‍‍‍^{y} | 18 | – | 12 | .600 | 41 | – | 20 | .672 |
| No. 15 North Carolina ‍‍‡‍^{y} | 17 | – | 13 | .567 | 46 | – | 19 | .708 |
| No. 16 Duke ‍‍‍^{y} | 15 | – | 15 | .500 | 35 | – | 27 | .565 |
| Virginia ‍‍‍ | 14 | – | 16 | .467 | 32 | – | 24 | .571 |
| Virginia Tech ‍‍‍ | 9 | – | 21 | .300 | 26 | – | 27 | .491 |
| Pittsburgh ‍‍‍ | 8 | – | 22 | .267 | 21 | – | 34 | .382 |
x – Division champion ‡ – Tournament champion y – Invited to the NCAA tournament As of June 27, 2019; Rankings from D1Baseball

The 2019 Florida State Seminoles baseball team represented Florida State University during the 2019 NCAA Division I baseball season. The Seminoles played their home games at Mike Martin Field at Dick Howser Stadium as a member of the Atlantic Coast Conference. They were led by head coach Mike Martin, in his 40th and final season at Florida State.

== Roster ==
2019 Florida State Seminoles baseball team
Players
Coaches

| # | Pos. | Name | B/T | Height | Weight | Year | Home town |
|---|---|---|---|---|---|---|---|
| 2 | INF | Nander De Sedas | / | 6 ft 2 in (1.88 m) | 190 lb (86 kg) | Fr | Panama City, Panama |
| 3 | INF | Danny Andzel | / | 5 ft 11 in (1.8 m) | 185 lb (84 kg) | Fr | Tallahassee, Florida |
| 5 | LHP | Shane Drohan | / | 6 ft 3 in (1.91 m) | 200 lb (91 kg) | So | West Palm Beach, Florida |
| 6 | INF | Brandon Walker | / | 6 ft 1 in (1.85 m) | 190 lb (86 kg) | Fr | Tallahassee, Florida |
| 7 | RHP | Cade Hungate | / | 6 ft 2 in (1.88 m) | 185 lb (84 kg) | So | Abingdon, Virginia |
| 8 | LHP | Caleb Cali | / | 6 ft 2 in (1.88 m) | 205 lb (93 kg) | Fr | Minneola, Florida |
| 9 | INF | Cooper Swanson | / | 6 ft 1 in (1.85 m) | 205 lb (93 kg) | Jr | Fort Myers, Florida |
| 10 | INF | Tyrell Brewer | / | 5 ft 10 in (1.78 m) | 150 lb (68 kg) | Fr | Orlando, Florida |
| 12 | RHP | Tyler Ahearn | / | 6 ft 2 in (1.88 m) | 195 lb (88 kg) | Jr | Jupiter, Florida |
| 13 | LHP | Jonah Scolaro | / | 5 ft 10 in (1.78 m) | 180 lb (82 kg) | Jr | Valrico, Florida |
| 14 | LHP | Ryan Pettys | / | 6 ft 2 in (1.88 m) | 165 lb (75 kg) | Fr | Panama City Beach, Florida |
| 15 | RHP | CJ Van Eyk | / | 6 ft 1 in (1.85 m) | 205 lb (93 kg) | Jr | Lutz, Florida |
| 16 | INF | Josiah Miller | / | 6 ft 0 in (1.83 m) | 185 lb (84 kg) | Fr | Tallahassee, Florida |
| 17 | LHP | Clayton Kwiatkowski | / | 6 ft 2 in (1.88 m) | 210 lb (95 kg) | Sr | Tampa, Florida |
| 18 | RHP | Hunter Perdue | / | 6 ft 3 in (1.91 m) | 195 lb (88 kg) | Jr | Chesapeake, Virginia |
| 19 | OF | Elijah Cabell | / | 6 ft 2 in (1.88 m) | 195 lb (88 kg) | So | Winter Park, Florida |
| 20 | RHP | Kyle McMullen (redshirt) | / | 6 ft 2 in (1.88 m) | 210 lb (95 kg) | RS Jr | Jupiter, Florida |
| 21 | RHP | Chris Ruckdeschel (redshirt) | / | 6 ft 1 in (1.85 m) | 190 lb (86 kg) | RS Fr | Davie, Florida |
| 22 | C | Bryce Boone | / | 6 ft 3 in (1.91 m) | 195 lb (88 kg) | Fr | Ocala, Florida |
| 23 | OF | Reese Albert | / | 6 ft 2 in (1.88 m) | 197 lb (89 kg) | Jr | Jupiter, Florida |
| 24 | OF | Lillo Paxia | / | 5 ft 11 in (1.8 m) | 210 lb (95 kg) | Fr | Eastampton, New Jersey |
| 25 | C | Doug Kirkland | / | 5 ft 11 in (1.8 m) | 195 lb (88 kg) | Fr | Orlando, Florida |
| 26 | OF | Robby Martin | / | 6 ft 3 in (1.91 m) | 200 lb (91 kg) | So | Tampa, Florida |
| 27 | INF | Jackson Greene | / | 5 ft 11 in (1.8 m) | 190 lb (86 kg) | Jr | Live Oak, Florida |
| 29 | LHP | Parker Messick | / | 6 ft 0 in (1.83 m) | 220 lb (100 kg) | Fr | Plant City, Florida |
| 30 | LHP | Antonio Velez | / | 6 ft 1 in (1.85 m) | 185 lb (84 kg) | Jr | Brandon, Florida |
| 31 | RHP | Conor Grady | / | 6 ft 2 in (1.88 m) | 187 lb (85 kg) | Jr | Tampa, Florida |
| 23 | INF | Logan Lacey | / | 5 ft 10 in (1.78 m) | 190 lb (86 kg) | Jr | Tallahassee, Florida |
| 33 | RHP | Chase Haney (redshirt) | / | 6 ft 6 in (1.98 m) | 225 lb (102 kg) | RS Sr | Winter Garden, Florida |
| 35 | INF | Carter Smith | / | 6 ft 1 in (1.85 m) | 180 lb (82 kg) | Sr | Fort Myers, Florida |
| 36 | RHP | Davis Hare | / | 6 ft 3 in (1.91 m) | 215 lb (98 kg) | Jr | Savannah, Georgia |
| 37 | INF | JD Tease | / | 5 ft 10 in (1.78 m) | 180 lb (82 kg) | Fr | Tallahassee, Florida |
| 40 | OF | Jack Anderson | / | 6 ft 3 in (1.91 m) | 185 lb (84 kg) | So | Tampa, Florida |
| 43 | LHP | Bryce Hubbart | / | 5 ft 11 in (1.8 m) | 180 lb (82 kg) | Fr | Windermere, Florida |
| 45 | OF | Dylan Simmons | / | 6 ft 3 in (1.91 m) | 220 lb (100 kg) | Fr | Jacksonville, Florida |
| 46 | RHP | Jake Suddreth | / | 6 ft 3 in (1.91 m) | 200 lb (91 kg) | Sr | Gilbert, Arizona |
| 51 | INF | Nico Baldor | / | 6 ft 2 in (1.88 m) | 195 lb (88 kg) | Sr | Tampa, Florida |
| 63 | OF | Matheu Nelson | / | 5 ft 11 in (1.8 m) | 195 lb (88 kg) | So | Largo, Florida |

Head coach

Mike Martin Jr.

Assistant coach(es)

Jimmy Belanger
Tyler Holt

Pitching coach(es)

Clyde Keller

Legend

- (C) Team captain
- (S) Suspended
- (I) Ineligible
- Injured
- Current redshirt

Roster
Last update: June 10, 2019

== Schedule ==
Legend
| | Florida State win |
| | Florida State loss |
| **Bold** | Florida State team member |

2019 Florida State Seminoles baseball game log
Regular season

February
| Date | Opponent | Rank | Site/stadium | Score | Win | Loss | Save | Attendance | Overall record | ACC record |

March
| Date | Opponent | Rank | Site/stadium | Score | Win | Loss | Save | Attendance | Overall record | ACC record |

April
| Date | Opponent | Rank | Site/stadium | Score | Win | Loss | Save | Attendance | Overall record | ACC record |

May
| Date | Opponent | Rank | Site/stadium | Score | Win | Loss | Save | Attendance | Overall record | ACC record |

Postseason

ACC Tournament
| Date | Opponent | Rank | Site/stadium | Score | Win | Loss | Save | Attendance | Overall record | ACCT Record |
|---|---|---|---|---|---|---|---|---|---|---|
| May 21 | (10) Wake Forest | (6) | Durham Bulls Athletic Park • Durham, NC | **L** 4–7 | Bach (1–0) | **Scolaro (3–2)** | None | 2,490 | 35–21 | 0–1 |
| May 24 | No. 15 (3) NC State | (6) | Durham Bulls Athletic Park • Durham, NC | **W** 11–0 | **Van Eyk (9–3)** | Barger (2–2) | None | 5,419 | 36–21 | 1–1 |

NCAA tournament: Athens Regional
| Date | Opponent | Rank | Site/stadium | Score | Win | Loss | Save | Attendance | Overall record | NCAAT record |
|---|---|---|---|---|---|---|---|---|---|---|
| May 31 | (2) Florida Atlantic | (3) | Foley Field • Athens, GA | **W** 13–7 | **Parrish (8–5)** | Sanderson (8–3) | **Velez (1)** | 2,800 | 37–21 | 1–0 |
| June 1 | at No. 7 (1) Georgia | (3) | Foley Field • Athens, GA | **W** 12–3 | **Van Eyk (10–3)** | Hancock (8–3) | None | 3,046 | 38–21 | 2–0 |
| June 2 | at No. 7 (1) Georgia | (3) | Foley Field • Athens, GA | **W** 10–1 | **Grady (9–5)** | Wilcox (3–2) | None | 2,996 | 39–21 | 3–0 |

NCAA tournament: Baton Rouge Super Regional
| Date | Opponent | Rank | Site/stadium | Score | Win | Loss | Save | Attendance | Overall record | NCAAT record |
|---|---|---|---|---|---|---|---|---|---|---|
| June 8 | at No. 12 (13) LSU | | Alex Box Stadium • Baton Rouge, LA | **W** 6–4 | **Velez (4–2)** | Fontenot (5–3) | **Flowers (12)** | 11,636 | 40–21 | 1–0 |
| June 9 | at No. 12 (13) LSU | | Alex Box Stadium • Baton Rouge, LA | **W** 5–4^{12} | **Velez (5–2)** | Fontenot (5–4) | None | 11,713 | 41–21 | 2–0 |

College World Series
| Date | Opponent | Rank | Site/stadium | Score | Win | Loss | Save | Attendance | Overall record | CWS record |
|---|---|---|---|---|---|---|---|---|---|---|
| June 15 | No. 5 (5) Arkansas | | TD Ameritrade Park • Omaha, NE | **W** 1–0 | **Parrish (9–5)** | Scroggins (3–1) | **Flowers (13)** | 26,155 | 42–21 | 1–0 |
| June 17 | Michigan | | TD Ameritrade Park • Omaha, NE | **L** 0–2 | Henry (11-5) | **Van Eyk (10–4)** | None | 23,541 | 42–22 | 1–1 |
| June 19 | No. 9 (8) Texas Tech | | TD Ameritrade Park • Omaha, NE | **L** 1–4 | Bonnin (7–1) | **Grady (9–6)** | Floyd (5) | 24,104 | 42–23 | 1–2 |

== 2019 MLB draft ==
| Player | Position | Round | Overall | MLB team |
|---|---|---|---|---|
| Drew Mendoza | 3B | 3 | 94 | Washington Nationals |
| J.C. Flowers | RHP | 4 | 124 | Pittsburgh Pirates |
| Drew Parrish | LHP | 8 | 229 | Kansas City Royals |
| Mike Salvatore | SS | 9 | 276 | Seattle Mariners |
