= 2019 NC State Wolfpack baseball team =

American college baseball season

2019 NC State Wolfpack baseball

NCAA Greenville Regional, 0–2
- Conference: Atlantic Coast Conference
- Record: 42–19 (18–12 ACC)
- Head coach: Elliott Avent (23rd season)
- Assistant coaches: Chris Hart (14th season); Austin Morgan (2nd season)
- Pitching coach: Clint Chrysler (1st season)
- Home stadium: Doak Field

2019 Atlantic Coast Conference baseball standings
	Conf.				Overall
Team	W		L	PCT	W		L	PCT
Atlantic
No. 3 Louisville ^{x}‍‍‍^{y}	21	–	9	.700	51	–	18	.739
NC State ‍‍‍^{y}	18	–	12	.600	42	–	19	.689
No. 8 Florida State ‍‍‍^{y}	17	–	13	.567	42	–	23	.646
Clemson ‍‍‍^{y}	15	–	15	.500	35	–	26	.574
Wake Forest ‍‍‍	14	–	16	.467	31	–	26	.544
Notre Dame ‍‍‍	13	–	17	.433	24	–	30	.444
Boston College ‍‍‍	12	–	18	.400	31	–	27	.534
Coastal
No. 17 Georgia Tech ^{x}‍‍‍^{y}	19	–	11	.633	43	–	19	.694
No. 19 Miami (FL) ‍‍‍^{y}	18	–	12	.600	41	–	20	.672
No. 15 North Carolina ‍‍‡‍^{y}	17	–	13	.567	46	–	19	.708
No. 16 Duke ‍‍‍^{y}	15	–	15	.500	35	–	27	.565
Virginia ‍‍‍	14	–	16	.467	32	–	24	.571
Virginia Tech ‍‍‍	9	–	21	.300	26	–	27	.491
Pittsburgh ‍‍‍	8	–	22	.267	21	–	34	.382
x – Division champion ‡ – Tournament champion y – Invited to the NCAA tournament As of June 27, 2019; Rankings from D1Baseball

The 2019 NC State Wolfpack baseball team represented North Carolina State University during the 2019 NCAA Division I baseball season. The Wolfpack played their home games at Doak Field as a member of the Atlantic Coast Conference. They were led by head coach Elliott Avent, his 23rd season at NC State. The Wolfpack finished the season 2nd in the ACC's Atlantic Division with a record of 42–19, 18–12 in conference play. They qualified as the three seed for the 2019 Atlantic Coast Conference baseball tournament, winning group C, and were eliminated in the semi-finals by Georgia Tech. They were invited to the Greenville Regional in the 2019 NCAA Division I baseball tournament where they were eliminated by East Carolina.

== Previous season ==
In 2018, the Wolfpack finished the season 2nd in the ACC's Atlantic Division with a record of 42–18, 19–11 in conference play. They qualified for the 2018 Atlantic Coast Conference baseball tournament, and were eliminated in pool play. They were invited to the 2018 NCAA Division I baseball tournament, where they hosted the Raleigh Regional, where they lost in the regional final to Auburn.

== Personnel ==
=== Roster ===
2019 NC State Wolfpack roster
Pitchers: 10 – David Harrison – Sophomore; 14 – Joe Ingle – Senior; 16 – Logan Whitaker – Freshman; 19 – Dalton Feeney – (redshirt) Sophomore; 20 – Austin Staley – (redshirt) Senior; 22 – Alec Barger – Junior; 23 – Hunter Christopher – Freshman; 25 – Andrew Blake – Junior; 26 – Michael Bienlien – Sophomore; 27 – Jason Parker – Junior; 29 – Reid Johnston – Sophomore; 30 – Mathieu Gauthier – Junior; 33 – Michael Bienlien – Junior; 34 – Evan Justice – Sophomore; 35 – Cameron Cotter – Sophomore; 38 – Baker Nelson – Freshman; 39 – Nolan Clenney – (redshirt) Senior; 41 – Joe O'Donnell – (redshirt) Senior; 43 – Connor Centala – (redshirt) Freshman; 44 – Kent Klyman – Junior; 45 – Josh Pike – Sophomore; 46 – Nick Swiney – Sophomore; 47 – Andrew Tillery – Freshman; 40 – John Creel – Junior; 51 – Canaan Silver – Sophomore	Catchers: 5 – Patrick Bailey – Sophomore; 12 – Brad Debo – Junior; 24 – Luca Tresh – Freshman; Infielders: 3 – Devonte Brown – Sophomore; 6 – Vojtech Mensik – Freshman; 7 – David Vazquez– Sophomore; 8 – Will Wilson – Junior; 13 – Tyler McDonough – Freshman; 15 – J.T. Jarrett – Sophomore; 17 – Dillon Cooper – (redshirt) Junior; 18 – Evan Edwards – Senior	Outfielders: 1 – Terrell Tatum - Sophomore; 2 – Jonny Butler – Sophomore; 11 – Lawson McArthur – Junior; 32 – Marek Chlup – Freshman

=== Coaching staff ===
Name	Position	Seasons at NC State	Alma mater
Elliott Avent	Head coach	23	North Carolina State University
Chris Hart	Associate head coach	14	Florida State University (2003)
Clint Chrysler	Pitching Coach	1	Daytona State College (2009)
Austin Morgan	Assistant Coach	2	College of Charleston (2010)

== Schedule ==
Legend
	NC State win
	NC State loss
	Postponement
**Bold**	NC State team member
*	Non-Conference game
†	Make-Up Game

2019 NC State Wolfpack baseball game log
Regular season
February

Date	Opponent	Rank	Site/stadium	Score	Win	Loss	Save	Attendance	Overall record	ACC Record
February 15	Bucknell*	22	Doak Field • Raleigh, NC	**W** 8–2	**Parker** (1–0)	Gottesman (0–1)	None	2,763	1–0	–
February 16	Bucknell*	22	Doak Field • Raleigh, NC	**W** 14–2	**Barger** (1–0)	Grabek (0–1)	None	2,306	2–0	–
February 17	Bucknell*	22	Doak Field • Raleigh, NC	**W** 12–8	**Klyman** (1–0)	Wincig (0–1)	**Feeney** (1)	2,315	3–0	–
February 19	at Elon*	22	Latham Park • Elon, NC	**W** 5–0	**Justice** (1–0)	Wetherbee (0–1)	None	244	4–0	–
February 22	vs Kent State*	22	TicketReturn.com Field • Myrtle Beach, SC	**W** 3–2 (11)	**Klyman** (2–0)	Schultz (0–1)	None	175	5–0	–
February 23	vs Michigan State*	22	Springs Brooks Stadium • Conway, SC	**W** 5–0	**Johnston** (1–0)	Tyranski (0–1)	None	409	6–0	–
February 24	at No. 10 Coastal Carolina*	22	Springs Brooks Stadium • Conway, SC	**W** 7–6	**Klyman** (3–0)	Kobos (1–1)	None	2,277	7–0	–
February 27	at Campbell*	10	Jim Perry Stadium • Buies Creek, NC	**W** 10–1	**Johnston** (2–0)	Johnson (0–1)	None	1,286	8–0	–

March

Date	Opponent	Rank	Site/stadium	Score	Win	Loss	Save	Attendance	Overall record	ACC Record
March 1	Minnesota*	10	Doak Field • Raleigh, NC	**W** 3–2	**Parker** (2–0)	Fredrickson (0–1)	**Feeney** (2)	2,018	9–0	–
March 2	Minnesota*	10	Doak Field • Raleigh, NC	**W** 8–4	**Silver** (1–0)	Thoresen (0–3)	None	3,048	10–0	–
March 3	Minnesota*	10	Doak Field • Raleigh, NC	**W** 5–4	**Bienlien** (1–0)	Burchill (0–1)	None	2,284	11–0	–
March 6	at NC Central*	5	Durham Athletic Park • Durham, NC	**W** 11–10 (10)	**Klyman** (4–0)	Guglielmello (0–3)	None	228	12–0	–
March 8	Pittsburgh	5	Doak Field • Raleigh, NC	**W** 4–3	**Bienlien** (2–0)	Moore (1–1)	**Klyman** (1)	2,167	13–0	1–0
March 9	Pittsburgh	5	Doak Field • Raleigh, NC	**W** 21–3	**Blake** (1–0)	Hammer (2–1)	None	2,392	14–0	2–0
March 10	Pittsburgh	5	Doak Field • Raleigh, NC	**W** 6–5	**Swiney** (1–0)	Moore (1–2)	**Feeney** (3)	2,558	15–0	3–0
March 12	at UNC–Charlotte*	2	BB&T Ballpark • Charlotte, NC	**W** 6–5	**Klyman** (5–0)	Herbert (0–1)	**Feeney** (4)	4,324	16–0	3–0
March 13	George Mason*	2	Doak Field • Raleigh, NC	**W** 18–3	**Cotter** (1–0)	Halligan (1–1)	None	2,234	17–0	3–0
March 15	No. 1 Florida State	2	Doak Field • Raleigh, NC	**W** 16–0	**Parker** (3–0)	Parrish (2–1)	None	2,662	18–0	4–0
March 16	No. 1 Florida State	2	Doak Field • Raleigh, NC	**W** 9–8	**Feeney** (1–0)	Grady (2–1)	None	3,048	19–0	5–0
March 17	No. 1 Florida State	2	Doak Field • Raleigh, NC	**L** 5–7	Drohan (2–0)	**Bienlien** (2–1)	Flowers (3)	3,048	19–1	5–1
March 19	Towson*	1	Doak Field • Raleigh, NC	**W** 11–1	**Clenney** (1–0)	Watters (0–2)	None	2,470	20–1	5–1
March 22	at No. 29 Miami (FL)	1	Alex Rodriguez Park at Mark Light Field • Coral Gables, FL	**W** 6–3	**Nelson** (1–0)	McKendry (4–1)	**Feeney** (5)	2,729	21–1	6–1
March 23	at No. 29 Miami (FL)	1	Alex Rodriguez Park at Mark Light Field • Coral Gables, FL	**W** 7–6	**Johnston** (3–0)	McMahon (1–2)	**Feeney** (6)	2,868	22–1	7–1
March 24	at No. 29 Miami (FL)	1	Alex Rodriguez Park at Mark Light Field • Coral Gables, FL	**W** 6–4	**Bienlien** (3–1)	Federman (0–2)	None	2,589	23–1	8–1
March 26	Elon*	1	Doak Field • Raleigh, NC	**W** 21–2	**Barger** (2–0)	Daniels (2–1)	**Gauthier** (1)	2,634	24–1	8–1
March 27	at North Carolina A&T*	1	First National Bank Field • Greensboro, NC	**W** 12–3	**Cotter** (2–0)	Foster (1–2)	None	1,049	25–1	8–1
March 29	Virginia	1	Doak Field • Raleigh, NC	**L** 3–4	Abbott (2–1)	**Parker** (3–1)	Whitten (4)	3,048	25–2	8–2
March 30	Virginia	1	Doak Field • Raleigh, NC	**W** 3–0	**Johnston** (4–0)	Murdock (1–2)	None	3,048	26–2	9–2
March 31	Virginia	1	Doak Field • Raleigh, NC	**W** 8–7	**Swiney** (2–0)	Harrington (1–1)	**Cotter** (1)	3,048	27–2	10–2

April

Date	Opponent	Rank	Site/stadium	Score	Win	Loss	Save	Attendance	Overall record	ACC Record
April 2	vs South Carolina*	1	BB&T Ballpark • Charlotte, NC	**L** 8–10	Sweatt (2–2)	**Cotter** (2–1)	None	4,090	27–3	10–2
April 5	at Boston College	1	Harrington Athletics Village • Chestnut Hill, MA	**W** 6–5	**Justice** (2–0)	Walsh (0–3)	**Silver** (1)	240	28–3	11–2
April 6	at Boston College	1	Harrington Athletics Village • Chestnut Hill, MA	**W** 16–4	**Johnston** (5–0)	Mancini (2–5)	None	563	29–3	12–2
April 7	at Boston College	1	Harrington Athletics Village • Chestnut Hill, MA	**L** 1–3	Lane (2–1)	**Cotter** (2–2)	None	525	29–4	12–3
April 11	Coastal Carolina*	2	Doak Field • Raleigh, NC	**L** 6–7	Damron (2–0)	**Klyman** (5–1)	Eardensohn (1)	3,048	29–5	12–3
April 13	No. 20 Louisville	2	Doak Field • Raleigh, NC	**L** 10–14	Detmers (6–2)	**Parkers** (3–2)	McAvene (4)	2,695	29–6	12–4
April 13	No. 20 Louisville	2	Doak Field • Raleigh, NC	**L** 2–14	Bennett (5–2)	**Johnston** (5–1)	Perkins (1)	2,695	29–7	12–5
April 14	No. 20 Louisville	2	Doak Field • Raleigh, NC	**L** 3–6	Miller (2–0)	**Silver** (1–1)	None	2,822	29–8	12–6
April 16	at UNC–Wilmington*	11	Brooks Field • Wilmington, NC	**W** 14–7	**Cotter** (3–2)	Herring (0–5)	None	2,548	30–8	12–6
April 18	at Wake Forest	11	David F. Couch Ballpark • Winston-Salem, NC	**L** 3–7	Peluse (3–5)	**Feeney** (1–1)	None	1,534	30–9	12–7
April 20	at Wake Forest	11	David F. Couch Ballpark • Winston-Salem, NC	**W** 4–3	**Swiney** (3–0)	Shuster (4–2)	None	1,707	31–9	13–7
April 20	at Wake Forest	11	David F. Couch Ballpark • Winston-Salem, NC	**L** 8–9	Witt (1–1)	**Cotter** (3–3)	Fleming (6)	1,707	31–10	13–8
April 23	Tennessee Tech*	14	Doak Field • Raleigh, NC	**W** 10–6	**Swiney** (4–0)	Cole (2–4)	None	2,669	32–10	13–8
April 26	at Notre Dame	14	Frank Eck Stadium • South Bend, IN	**L** 4–5	Belcik (1–3)	**Harrison** (0–1)	Vail (4)	450	32–11	13–9
April 27	at Notre Dame	14	Frank Eck Stadium • South Bend, IN	**W** 4–2	**Justice** (3–0)	Junker (2–2)	**Swiney** (1)	150	33–11	14–9
April 28	at Notre Dame	14	Frank Eck Stadium • South Bend, IN	**L** 1–4	Brown (3–5)	**Silver** (1–2)	Vail (5)	250	33–12	14–10
April 30	UNC–Wilmington*	20	Doak Field • Raleigh, NC	**W** 11–3	**Cotter** (4–3)	Haire (0–1)	None	2,870	34–12	14–10

May

Date	Opponent	Rank	Site/stadium	Score	Win	Loss	Save	Attendance	Overall record	ACC Record
May 3	Radford*	20	Doak Field • Raleigh, NC	**W** 6–3	**Parker** (4–2)	Ridgely (3–3)	**Klyman** (2)	2,784	35–12	14–10
May 4	Radford*	20	Doak Field • Raleigh, NC	**W** 9–3	**Justice** (4–0)	Nardi (3–3)	**Cotter** (2)	2,776	36–12	14–10
May 5	Radford*	20	Doak Field • Raleigh, NC	**W** 6–3	**Swiney** (5–0)	Gerber (1–2)	**Feeney** (7)	2,414	37–12	14–10
May 7	Campbell*	20	Doak Field • Raleigh, NC	**L** 3–5	Westlake (3–2)	**Barger** (2–1)	Messer (3)	2,613	37–13	14–10
May 10	Clemson	20	Doak Field • Raleigh, NC	**W** 6–1	**Swiney** (6–0)	Clark (7–2)	None	3,048	38–13	15–10
May 11	Clemson	20	Doak Field • Raleigh, NC	**L** 5–6 (10)	Spiers (2–4)	**Klyman** (5–2)	None	2,929	38–14	15–11
May 12	Clemson	20	Doak Field • Raleigh, NC	**W** 8–3	**Cotter** (5–3)	Jones (2–1)	None	2,704	39–14	16–11
May 16	at No. 13 North Carolina	25	Boshamer Stadium • Chapel Hill, NC	**L** 3–5	Butler (2–0)	**Swiney** (6–1)	Lancellotti (2)	3,162	39–15	16–11
May 17	at No. 13 North Carolina	25	Boshamer Stadium • Chapel Hill, NC	**W** 11–2	**Johnston** (6–1)	Bergner (5–1)	None	3,829	40–15	17–11
May 18	at No. 13 North Carolina	25	Boshamer Stadium • Chapel Hill, NC	**W** 11–0	**Swiney** (7–1)	Sandy (2–2)	None	3,837	41–15	18–11

Postseason
ACC Tournament

Date	Opponent	Rank	Site/stadium	Score	Win	Loss	Save	Attendance	Overall record	ACCT Record
May 23	vs (10) Wake Forest	14 (3)	Durham Bulls Athletic Park • Durham, NC	**W** 6–5	**Nelson** (2–0)	Fleming (1–4)	**Cotter** (3)	4,318	42–15	1–0
May 24	vs No. 19 (6) Florida State	14 (3)	Durham Bulls Athletic Park • Durham, NC	**L** 0–11 (7)	Van Eyk (9–3)	**Barger** (2–2)	None	5,419	42–16	1–1
May 25	vs No. 6 (2) Georgia Tech	14 (3)	Durham Bulls Athletic Park • Durham, NC	**L** 2–9	Hughes (8–2)	**Parker** (4–3)	None	5,846	42–17	1–2

NCAA tournament Greenville Regional

Date	Opponent	Rank	Site/stadium	Score	Win	Loss	Save	Attendance	Overall record	NCAAT Record
May 31	(3) Campbell	15 (2)	Lewis Field at Clark–LeClair Stadium • Greenville, NC	**L** 4–5	Horrell (10–3)	**Johnston** (6–2)	Moore (5)	4,239	42–18	0–1
June 2	(1) No. 10 East Carolina	15 (2)	Lewis Field at Clark–LeClair Stadium • Greenville, NC	**L** 2–9	Agnos (11–2)	**Parker** (4–4)	None	4,670	42–19	0–2

All rankings from Collegiate Baseball.

=== Greenville Regional ===
Greenville Regional Teams
(1) East Carolina Pirates	(2) NC State Wolfpack	(3) Campbell Fighting Camels	(4) Quinnipiac Bobcats

First round
1	East Carolina	4
4	**Quinnipiac**	**5**
3	**Campbell**	**5**
2	NC State	4
Lower round 1
1	**East Carolina**	**9**
2	NC State	2

Semi-finals
4	Quinnipiac	8
3	**Campbell**	**9**
Lower final
1	**East Carolina**	**13**
4	Quinnipiac	3

Finals
3	Campbell
1	**East Carolina**

== Ranking movements ==
Ranking movements Legend: ██ Increase in ranking ██ Decrease in ranking — = Not ranked
	Week																			
Poll	Pre	1	2	3	4	5	6	7	8	9	10	11	12	13	14	15	16	17	18	Final
Coaches'	23	23*		17	12	5	4	3	4	8	14	19	16	16	14	16				
Baseball America	—	—	—	23	21	6	5	4	4	9	16	21	17	13	13	18				
Collegiate Baseball^	22	22	10	5	2	1	1	1	2	11	14	20	20	25	14	15				
NCBWA†	30	29	29	20	18	10	6	5	5	11	15	21	19	18	15	19				
D1Baseball	—	—	—	22	20	6	5	3	3	9	14	20	19	17	15	20				

^ Collegiate Baseball ranked 40 teams in their preseason poll, but only ranked 30 teams weekly during the season.
† NCBWA ranks 30 teams in their preseason poll, but only ranks 25 teams weekly during the season.
* A new poll was not released for this week, so for comparison purposes, the previous week's ranking is inserted in this week's slot.

== 2019 MLB draft ==
Player	Position	Round	Overall	MLB team
Will Wilson	SS	1	15	Los Angeles Dodgers
Jason Parker	RHP	16	474	Cincinnati Reds
Alec Barger	RHP	17	517	Atlanta Braves
Andrew Blake	RHP	21	631	Los Angeles Angels
Michael Bienlien	RHP	24	712	Detroit Tigers
Thayer Thomas	OF	33	1,007	Washington Nationals
Evan Justice	LHP	39	1,161	Miami Marlins
