= 2019 North Carolina Tar Heels baseball team =

College baseball season

2019 North Carolina Tar Heels baseball

ACC Tournament champion Chapel Hill Regional Champion

Chapel Hill Super Regional, 1–2
- Conference: Atlantic Coast Conference

Ranking
- Coaches: No. 13
- CB: No. 12
- Record: 46–19 (17–13 ACC)
- Head coach: Mike Fox (21st season)
- Assistant coaches: Scott Forbes (16th season); Robert Woodard (2nd season); Jesse Wierzbicki (3rd season)
- Home stadium: Bryson Field at Boshamer Stadium

2019 Atlantic Coast Conference baseball standings
	Conf.				Overall
Team	W		L	PCT	W		L	PCT
Atlantic
No. 3 Louisville ^{x}‍‍‍^{y}	21	–	9	.700	51	–	18	.739
NC State ‍‍‍^{y}	18	–	12	.600	42	–	19	.689
No. 8 Florida State ‍‍‍^{y}	17	–	13	.567	42	–	23	.646
Clemson ‍‍‍^{y}	15	–	15	.500	35	–	26	.574
Wake Forest ‍‍‍	14	–	16	.467	31	–	26	.544
Notre Dame ‍‍‍	13	–	17	.433	24	–	30	.444
Boston College ‍‍‍	12	–	18	.400	31	–	27	.534
Coastal
No. 17 Georgia Tech ^{x}‍‍‍^{y}	19	–	11	.633	43	–	19	.694
No. 19 Miami (FL) ‍‍‍^{y}	18	–	12	.600	41	–	20	.672
No. 15 North Carolina ‍‍‡‍^{y}	17	–	13	.567	46	–	19	.708
No. 16 Duke ‍‍‍^{y}	15	–	15	.500	35	–	27	.565
Virginia ‍‍‍	14	–	16	.467	32	–	24	.571
Virginia Tech ‍‍‍	9	–	21	.300	26	–	27	.491
Pittsburgh ‍‍‍	8	–	22	.267	21	–	34	.382
x – Division champion ‡ – Tournament champion y – Invited to the NCAA tournament As of June 27, 2019; Rankings from D1Baseball

The 2019 North Carolina Tar Heels baseball team represented the University of North Carolina at Chapel Hill in the 2019 NCAA Division I baseball season. Head coach Mike Fox was in his 21st year coaching the Tar Heels. They played their home games at Bryson Field at Boshamer Stadium and were members of the Atlantic Coast Conference.

== Roster ==
2019 UNC Baseball roster
Pitchers: 23 - Tyler Baum - Junior; 24 - Hansen Butler - (redshirt) Senior; 27 - Josh Dotson - Freshman; 31 - Joey Lancellotti - Sophomore; 34 - Caden O’Brien - Sophomore; 36 - Nik Pry - Freshman; 37 - Andrew Grogan - Junior; 38 - Davis Palermo - Freshman; 39 - Kyle Blendinger - Sophomore; 41 - Will Sandy - Freshman; 42 - Gianluca Dalatri - Junior; 44 - Austin Love - (redshirt) Freshman; 45 - Austin Bergner - Junior; 46 - Ben Casparius - Sophomore; 47 - Bennit Nance - Freshman; 48 - Connor Ollio - Freshman	Catchers: 4 - Brandon Martorano - Junior; 43 - Brandon Illies - Senior; Infielders: 1 - Danny Serretti - Freshman; 5 - Ashton McGee - Junior; 8 - Ike Freeman - Junior; 10 - Tom Caufield - Freshman; 15 - Michael Busch - Junior; 17 - Jake Holtzapple - (redshirt) Sophomore; 18 - Clemente Inclan - Sophomore; 19 - Aaron Sabato - Freshman	Outfielders: 2 - Cameron Brantley - Freshman; 3 - Dylan Harris - Junior; 6 - Dylan Enwiller - Senior; 7 - Dallas Tessar - (redshirt) Junior; 11 - Caleb Roberts - Freshman; 14 - Will Schroeder - Freshman; 16 - Earl Semper - Sophomore; 26 - Jackson Hesterlee - Senior; 40 - Angel Zarate - (redshirt) Freshman

== 2019 MLB draft ==
Player	Position	Round	Overall	MLB team
Michael Busch	2B	1	31	Los Angeles Dodgers
Tyler Baum	RHP	2	66	Oakland Athletics
Austin Bergner	RHP	9	262	Detroit Tigers
Ike Freeman	SS	14	430	Cleveland Indians
Brandon Martorano	C	16	476	San Francisco Giants
Ashton McGee	IF	18	553	Milwaukee Brewers
Hansen Butler	RHP	25	740	Chicago White Sox
Joey Lancellotti	RHP	34	--	New York Yankees
Gianluca Dalatri	RHP	40	1,192	Detroit Tigers
