= 2019 Louisville Cardinals baseball team =

American college baseball season

2019 Louisville Cardinals baseball

ACC regular-season champions NCAA Louisville Regional champion NCAA Louisville Super Regional champion

College World Series, 3rd (tie)
- Conference: Atlantic Coast Conference

Ranking
- Coaches: No. 3
- CB: No. 3
- Record: 51–18 (21–9 ACC)
- Head coach: Dan McDonnell (13th season)
- Assistant coaches: Roger Williams (13th season); Eric Snider (5th season); Adam Vrable (5th season)
- Home stadium: Jim Patterson Stadium

2019 Atlantic Coast Conference baseball standings
	Conf.				Overall
Team	W		L	PCT	W		L	PCT
Atlantic
No. 3 Louisville ^{x}‍‍‍^{y}	21	–	9	.700	51	–	18	.739
NC State ‍‍‍^{y}	18	–	12	.600	42	–	19	.689
No. 8 Florida State ‍‍‍^{y}	17	–	13	.567	42	–	23	.646
Clemson ‍‍‍^{y}	15	–	15	.500	35	–	26	.574
Wake Forest ‍‍‍	14	–	16	.467	31	–	26	.544
Notre Dame ‍‍‍	13	–	17	.433	24	–	30	.444
Boston College ‍‍‍	12	–	18	.400	31	–	27	.534
Coastal
No. 17 Georgia Tech ^{x}‍‍‍^{y}	19	–	11	.633	43	–	19	.694
No. 19 Miami (FL) ‍‍‍^{y}	18	–	12	.600	41	–	20	.672
No. 15 North Carolina ‍‍‡‍^{y}	17	–	13	.567	46	–	19	.708
No. 16 Duke ‍‍‍^{y}	15	–	15	.500	35	–	27	.565
Virginia ‍‍‍	14	–	16	.467	32	–	24	.571
Virginia Tech ‍‍‍	9	–	21	.300	26	–	27	.491
Pittsburgh ‍‍‍	8	–	22	.267	21	–	34	.382
x – Division champion ‡ – Tournament champion y – Invited to the NCAA tournament As of June 27, 2019; Rankings from D1Baseball

The 2019 Louisville Cardinals baseball team represented the University of Louisville during the 2019 NCAA Division I baseball season. The Cardinals played their home games at Jim Patterson Stadium as a member of the Atlantic Coast Conference. They were led by head coach Dan McDonnell, in his thirteenth year at Louisville.

== Roster ==
2019 Louisville Cardinals roster
Pitchers: 4 – Adam Elliott – Junior; 5 – Shay Smiddy – Junior; 8 – Nick Bennett – Junior; 15 – Bobby Miller – Sophomore; 26 – Kerry Wright – Freshman; 27 – Bryan Hoeing – Senior; 28 – J.D. Mundt – Senior; 30 – Austin Dickey – Junior; 31 – Carter Lohman – Freshman; 33 – Michael Kirian – Sophomore; 35 – Garrett Schmeltz – Freshman; 36 – Glenn Albanese – Senior; 39 – Jack Perkins – Freshman; 40 – Danny Zimmerman – Freshman; 41 – Michael McAvene – Junior; 42 – Reid Detmers – Sophomore; 44 – Gavin Sullivan – Sophomore; 45 – Luke Smith – Junior	Catchers: 6 – Ben Bianco – Sophomore; 11 – Zeke Pinkham – Senior; 18 – Pat Rumoro – Senior; 22 – Ben Metzinger – Freshman; 32 – Henry Davis – Freshman; 34 – Zach Britton – Sophomore; Infielders: 2 – Tyler Fitzgerald – Junior; 7 – Lucas Dunn – Sophomore; 10 – Tim Borden II – Freshman; 13 – Alex Binelas – Freshman; 16 – Justin Lavey – Junior; 24 – Cameron Masterman – Sophomore; 25 – Jared Poland – Freshman; 29 – Andrew Benefield – Freshman; 43 – Logan Wyatt – Junior	Outfielders: 1 – Drew Campbell – Junior; 9 – Danny Oriente – Junior; 14 – Trey Leonard – Sophomore; 17 – Ethan Stringer – Junior; 20 – Jake Snider – Junior

== Schedule ==
Legend
	Louisville win
	Louisville loss
**Bold**	Louisville team member

2019 Louisville Cardinals baseball game log
Regular season

February (5–3)
Date	Time (ET)	TV	Opponent	Rank	Site/stadium	Score	Win	Loss	Save	Attendance	Overall	ACC
February 15	6:00 pm		UConn*	#9	Joker Marchant Stadium • Lakeland, FL	**L** 2–3	Gardner (1–0)	**Elliott** (0–1)	Wallace (1)	247	0–1	–
February 16	3:00 pm		UConn*	#9	Joker Marchant Stadium • Lakeland, FL	**W** 12–2	**Bennett** (1–0)	Dunlop (0–1)	–	457	1–1	–
February 17	12:30 pm		UConn*	#9	Joker Marchant Stadium • Lakeland, FL	**L** 3–8	Santos (1–0)	**Hoeing** (0–1)	Wallace (2)	368	1–2	–
February 19	3:00 pm	ACCN Extra	Eastern Kentucky*	#12	Jim Patterson Stadium • Louisville, KY	**W** 5–1	**Smith** (1–0)	Jackson (0–2)	–	369	2–2	–
February 22	2:00 pm	ACCN Extra	Brown*	#12	Jim Patterson Stadium • Louisville, KY	**W** 7–0	**Detmers** (1–0)	Garner (0–1)	–		3–2	–
February 22	5:10 pm	ACCN Extra	Brown*	#12	Jim Patterson Stadium • Louisville, KY	**W** 5–4^{10}	**Poland** (1–0)	Wilder (0–1)	–	952	4–2	–
February 23	1:45 pm	ACCN Extra	Brown*	#12	Jim Patterson Stadium • Louisville, KY	**W** 13–2	**Hoeing** (1–1)	Delano (0–1)	–	568	5–2	–
February 26	3:00 pm	ACCN Extra	Xavier*	#12	Jim Patterson Stadium • Louisville, KY	**W** 4–5^{10}	Flamm (1–1)	**Poland** (1–1)	–	718	5–3	–

March
Date	Time (ET)	TV	Opponent	Rank	Site/stadium	Score	Win	Loss	Save	Attendance	Overall	ACC
March 1	4:00 pm	ACCN Extra	James Madison*	#12	Jim Patterson Stadium • Louisville, KY	**W** 5–0	**Detmers** (2–0)	Kelly (2–1)	–	321	6–3	–
March 2	12:00 pm	ACCN Extra	James Madison*	#12	Jim Patterson Stadium • Louisville, KY	**W** 11–1	**Bennett** (2–0)	Stewart (0–2)	–		7–3	–
March 2	4:00 pm	ACCN Extra	James Madison*	#12	Jim Patterson Stadium • Louisville, KY	**W** 1–0	**Hoeing** (2–1)	Ayer (2–1)	**Miller** (1)	592	8–3	–

April
Date	Opponent	Rank	Site/stadium	Score	Win	Loss	Save	Attendance	Overall record	ACC record

May
Date	Opponent	Rank	Site/stadium	Score	Win	Loss	Save	Attendance	Overall record	ACC record

Postseason (8–5)

ACC Tournament (0–2)
Date	Time (ET)	TV	Opponent	Rank	Site/stadium	Score	Win	Loss	Save	Attendance	Overall	Tourney
May 22	11:00 am	ACCN Extra	(12) Boston College	(1)	Durham Bulls Athletic Park • Durham, NC	**L** 1–5	Metzdorf (8–2)	**Hoenig** (3–3)	–		43–14	0–1
May 23	11:00 am	ACCN Extra	(8) Clemson	(1)	Durham Bulls Athletic Park • Durham, NC	**L** 1–7	Clark (9–2)	**Detmers** (11–3)	–		43–15	0–2

Louisville Regional (4–1)
Date	Time (ET)	TV	Opponent	Rank	Site/stadium	Score	Win	Loss	Save	Attendance	Overall	Regional
May 31	6:00 pm	ESPN3	(4) UIC	(1)	Jim Patterson Stadium • Louisville, KY	**W** 5–3	**Bennett** (7–3)	Key (7–9)	**McAvene** (7)	3,092	44–15	1–0
June 1	4:00 pm	ESPN3	(3) Illinois State	(1)	Jim Patterson Stadium • Louisville, KY	**L** 2–4	Walker (5–8)	**Detmers** (11–3)	–	2,843	44–16	1–1
June 2	12:00 pm	ESPN3	(2) Indiana	(1)	Jim Patterson Stadium • Louisville, KY	**W** 9–7	**Miller** (6–1)	Gordon (6–6)	**Kirian** (4)	2,339	45–16	2–1
June 2	6:00 pm	ESPN3	(3) Illinois State	(1)	Jim Patterson Stadium • Louisville, KY	**W** 11–2	**Smith** (6–0)	Lindgren (5–5)	–	2,345	46–16	3–1
June 3	1:00 pm	ESPN3	(3) Illinois State	(1)	Jim Patterson Stadium • Louisville, KY	**W** 4–3	**Kirian** (3–1)	Gilmore (2–2)	–	2,878	47–16	4–1

Louisville Super Regional (2–0)
Date	Time (ET)	TV	Opponent	Rank	Site/stadium	Score	Win	Loss	Save	Attendance	Overall	Super Regional
June 7	12:00 pm	ESPN2	#8 East Carolina	#6	Jim Patterson Stadium • Louisville, KY	**W** 14–1	**Detmers** (12–4)	Agnos (11–3)	–	2,955	48–16	1–0
June 8	12:00 pm	ESPN2	#8 East Carolina	#6	Jim Patterson Stadium • Louisville, KY	**W** 12–0	**Miller** (7–1)	Burleson (6–2)	–	4,458	49–16	2–0

College World Series (2–2)
Date	Time (ET)	TV	Opponent	Rank	Site/stadium	Score	Win	Loss	Save	Attendance	Overall	CWS
June 16	2:00 pm	ESPN	#1 Vanderbilt	#4	TD Ameritrade Park • Omaha, NE	**L** 1–3	Fellows (13–1)	**Hoeing** (3–4)	Brown (15)	22,704	49–17	0–1
June 18	2:00 pm	ESPN	#7 Auburn	#4	TD Ameritrade Park • Omaha, NE	**W** 5–3	**Elliott** (3–2)	Horn (4–2)	**Kirian** (5)	14,481	50–17	1–1
June 20	8:00 pm	ESPN2	#3 Mississippi State	#4	TD Ameritrade Park • Omaha, NE	**W** 4–3	**Detmers** (13–4)	Gordon (5–1)	–	24,201	51–17	2–1
June 21	7:00 pm	ESPN	#1 Vanderbilt	#4	TD Ameritrade Park • Omaha, NE	**L** 2–3	Eder (2–0)	**Smith** (6–1)	Brown (17)	24,673	51–18	2–2

"#" represents ranking. All rankings from Collegiate Baseball on the date of the contest.
"()" represents postseason seeding in the ACC Tournament or NCAA Regional, respectively.
