= Gino DiMare =

American baseball player and coach

Biographical details
- Born: July 21, 1969 (age 57); Miami, Florida, U.S.

Playing career
- 1989–1992: Miami (FL)
- 1992: Winter Haven Red Sox
- 1992: Gulf Coast League Red Sox
- 1993: Fort Lauderdale Red Sox
- Position: Outfielder

Coaching career (HC unless noted)
- 1996: Westminster Christian (assistant)
- 1997–2008: Miami (FL) (assistant)
- 2012–2018: Miami (FL) (assistant)
- 2019–2023: Miami (FL)

Head coaching record
- Overall: 168–86
- Tournaments: ACC: 4–6; NCAA: 6–8

Gino DiMare (born July 21, 1969) is an American baseball coach who was the former head baseball coach for the Miami Hurricanes baseball team at the University of Miami. DiMare played college baseball at the University of Miami under head coach Ron Fraser from 1989 to 1992 before pursuing a professional career.

DiMare began his head coaching career with the Hurricanes in 2019 after taking over for retiring head coach Jim Morris following the 2018 season.

DiMare previously spent 19 seasons as an assistant coach for the Hurricanes.

== Head coaching record ==
Record table
Season	Team	Overall	Conference	Standing	Postseason
Miami Hurricanes (Atlantic Coast Conference) (2019–2023)
2019	Miami	41–20	18–12	2nd (Coastal)	NCAA regional
2020	Miami	12–4	3–0	(Coastal)	Season canceled due to COVID-19
2021	Miami	33–21	20–15	2nd (Coastal)	NCAA regional
2022	Miami	40–20	20–10	2nd (Coastal)	NCAA regional
2023	Miami	42–21	18–12	2nd (Coastal)	NCAA regional
Miami:		168–86	79–49		
Total:		168–86 (.661)			
National champion Postseason invitational champion Conference regular season champion Conference regular season and conference tournament champion Division regular season champion Division regular season and conference tournament champion Conference tournament champion
