= 2019 NCAA Division I baseball rankings =

2019 NCAA Division I baseball season
- Duration: February 15, 2019–June 2019
- Number of teams: 299
- Preseason No. 1: LSU (CB, Coaches), Vanderbilt (BA, D1, NCBWA)

Tournament
- Duration: May 31, 2019 – June 26, 2019
- Most conference bids: SEC (10)

College World Series
- Champions: Vanderbilt (2nd title)
- Runners-up: Michigan
- MOP: Kumar Rocker, Vanderbilt

Seasons
- ← 2018 2020 →

The following human polls make up the 2019 NCAA Division I men's baseball rankings. The USA Today/ESPN Coaches Poll is voted on by a panel of 31 Division I baseball coaches. The Baseball America poll is voted on by staff members of the Baseball America magazine. These polls, along with the Perfect Game USA poll, rank the top 25 teams nationally. Collegiate Baseball and the National Collegiate Baseball Writers Association rank the top 30 teams nationally.

== Legend ==
	Increase in ranking
	Decrease in ranking
	Not ranked previous week
Italics	Number of first place votes
(#–#)	Win–loss record
т	Tied with team above or below also with this symbol

== ESPN/USA Today Coaches Poll ==
	Preseason Jan 24	Week 3 Mar 4	Week 4 Mar 11	Week 5 Mar 18	Week 6 Mar 25	Week 7 Apr 1	Week 8 Apr 8	Week 9 Apr 15	Week 10 Apr 22	Week 11 Apr 29	Week 12 May 6	Week 13 May 13	Week 14 May 20	Week 15 May 27	Final June 27	
1.	LSU 14	Vanderbilt (19) (9–2)	Oregon State (11) (12–1–1)	UCLA (19) (14–4)	UCLA (20) (17–4)	UCLA (20) (20–5)	UCLA (29) (23–6)	UCLA (29) (27–6)	UCLA (28) (30–7)	UCLA (28) (34–7)	UCLA (23) (37–8)	UCLA (28) (41–8)	UCLA (26) (45–8)	UCLA (21) (47–8)	Vanderbilt (30) (59–12)	1.
2.	Vanderbilt 10	Oregon State (8) (10–1)	Vanderbilt (15) (13–3)	Oregon State (1) (14–3–1)	Mississippi State (2) (22–3)	Stanford (3) (18–3)	Georgia (1) (27–6)	Mississippi State (1) (31–6)	Oregon State (28–8–1)	Vanderbilt (2) (34–9)	Vanderbilt (7) (38–9)	Vanderbilt (3) (41–10)	Vanderbilt (4) (45–10)	Vanderbilt (9) (49–10)	Michigan (50–22)	2.
3.	Florida 1	North Carolina (1) (11–1)	UCLA (2) (11–3)	Stanford (1) (12–3)	Stanford (15–3) (1) (15–3)	NC State (27–2)	Oregon State (23–6–1)	Stanford (24–5)	Stanford (27–6)	Stanford (31–7)	Stanford (34–8)	Stanford (37–9)	Mississippi State (45–11)	Stanford (41–11)	Louisville (51–18)	3.
4.	Texas Tech	UCLA (2) (9–2)	Stanford (1) (12–3)	Mississippi State (4) (18–2)	NC State (23–1) (1) (23–1)	Vanderbilt (2) (22–6)	NC State (1) (29–4)	Oregon State (25–8–1)	Vanderbilt (1) (31–9)	Oregon State (31–10–1)	Arkansas (37–12)	Arkansas (39–13)	Stanford (39–10)	Mississippi State (46–13)	Mississippi State (52–15)	4.
5.	Oregon State	Stanford (9–2)	Mississippi State (15–1)	NC State (19–1)	Vanderbilt (4) (19–5)	Arizona State (5) (25–1)	Stanford (20–5)	Vanderbilt (1) (27–9)	Georgia (1) (33–8)	Louisville (35–9)	Louisville (1) (39–9)	Mississippi State (42–10)	Arkansas (40–15)	Arkansas (41–17)	Texas Tech (46–20)	5.
6.	North Carolina	Florida (9–4)	Florida State (13–1)	Vanderbilt (1) (15–5)	Georgia (21–3)	Oregon State (1) (19–5–1)	Mississippi State (27–6)	Georgia (29–8)	Louisville (31–9)	Arkansas (34–11)	Mississippi State (38–10)	Georgia Tech (35–15)	Georgia (42–14)	Georgia (44–15)	Arkansas (46–20)	6.
7.	UCLA	Florida State (10–0)	Florida (13–5)	Louisville (16–4)	Oregon State (1) (16–4–1)	Georgia (23–5)	Vanderbilt (24–8)	Louisville (28–8)	Arkansas (30–10)	Mississippi State (1) (36–9)	Georgia (37–12)	Georgia (39–14)	Louisville (43–13)	Georgia Tech (41–17)	Florida State (42–23)	7.
8.	Louisville	Mississippi State (10–1)	Ole Miss (12–3)	Georgia (18–2)	Arkansas (20–4)	Mississippi State (24–5)	LSU (23–10)	NC State (29–8)	Mississippi State (32–9)	Georgia (33–12)	Georgia Tech (33–14)	East Carolina (39–12)	Georgia Tech (38–16)	Louisville (43–15)	UCLA (52–11)	8.
9.	Stanford	LSU (8–3)	Texas Tech (11–3)	Arkansas (1) (17–2)	Arizona State (2) (22–1)	Arkansas (22–6)	Arizona State (26–4)	Texas A&M (27–10–1)	UC Santa Barbara (30–5)	Georgia Tech (30–14)	East Carolina (36–11)	Louisville (40–12)	East Carolina (42–13)	East Carolina (43–15)	Auburn (38–28)	9.
10.	Ole Miss	Arkansas (9–1)	Arkansas (12–2)	Arizona State (4) (19–0)	Louisville (18–6)	Louisville (22–6)	Arkansas (24–8)	Arkansas (26–10)	Texas A&M (29–12–1)	East Carolina (33–11)	Texas Tech (33–14)	Texas Tech (34–14)	Texas Tech (36–15)	Texas Tech (39–17)	Stanford (45–14)	10.
11.	Florida State	Texas (10–3)	Georgia (14–2)	LSU (15–5)	Texas A&M (21–5)	Texas A&M (23–6–1)	East Carolina (24–7)	UC Santa Barbara (27–5)	Arizona State (30–8)	North Carolina (33–12)	Oregon State (31–14–1)	UC Santa Barbara (40–7)	UC Santa Barbara (44–7)	Oklahoma State (36–18)	Oklahoma State (40–21)	11.
12.	Arkansas	Texas Tech (6–3)	NC State (15–0)	Auburn (18–2)	Auburn (20–4)	LSU (19–9)	Texas A&M (25–8–1)	Arizona State (27–7)	East Carolina (29–10)	Texas Tech (29–13)	North Carolina (34–12)	Oregon State (33–15–1)	Oregon State (35–16–1)	North Carolina (42–17)	East Carolina (47–18)	12.
13.	Georgia	Ole Miss (8–2)	LSU (11–4)	North Carolina (16–5)	Texas Tech (15–6)	North Carolina (22–7)	Texas Tech (21–9)	North Carolina (27–10)	Georgia Tech (27–13)	UC Santa Barbara (32–7)	UC Santa Barbara (36–7)	Baylor (32–13)	Oklahoma State (32–17)	UC Santa Barbara (45–9)	North Carolina (46–19)	13.
14.	East Carolina	Louisville (8–3)	Louisville (11–4)	Florida (15–7)	Coastal Carolina (18–5–1)	Texas Tech (18–7)	Louisville (24–8)	LSU (24–13)	NC State (31–10)	LSU (29–16)	Ole Miss (32–17)	NC State (39–14)	NC State (41–15)	Oregon State (36–18–1)	Ole Miss (41–27)	14.
15.	Mississippi State	Georgia (9–2)	North Carolina (12–4)	Texas (15–7)	LSU (17–7)	Auburn (22–6)	Ole Miss (23–10)	East Carolina (25–10)	North Carolina (30–11)	Ole Miss (30–15)	Baylor (32–13)	North Carolina (36–15)	Texas A&M (36–19–1)	West Virginia (37–20)	Georgia (46–17)	15.
16.	Texas	Coastal Carolina (10–2)	Coastal Carolina (13–3–1)	Coastal Carolina (16–4–1)	Texas (17–10)	East Carolina (21–6)	Clemson (24–8)	Georgia Tech (24–12)	LSU (26–15)	Arizona State (32–10)	NC State (37–12)	Ole Miss (32–20)	Miami (FL) (38–17)	NC State (42–17)	LSU (40–26)	16.
17.	TCU	NC State (11–0)	Auburn (14–2)	Texas Tech (12–5)	North Carolina (18–7)	Texas (20–11)	Texas (21–13)	Ole Miss (25–12)	Texas Tech (25–13)	Texas A&M (30–15–1)	LSU (30–18)	Miami (FL) (36–15)	LSU (34–22)	LSU (37–24)	Georgia Tech (43–19)	17.
18.	Baylor	Auburn (9–2)	Texas (12–6)	Texas A&M (12–5)	East Carolina (18–6)	Ole Miss (20–9)	North Carolina (23–9)	Texas Tech (23–11)	Tennessee (30–11)	Baylor (30–12)	Texas A&M (32–17–1)	Oklahoma State (30–17)	Baylor (33–15)	Ole Miss (37–25)	Duke (35–27)	18.
19.	Clemson	Michigan (8–1)	Arizona State (15–0)	Florida State (14–4)	Oklahoma (21–4)	Clemson (22–6)	Auburn (23–9)	Baylor (24–10)	Ole Miss (27–14)	NC State (33–12)	Miami (FL) (34–14)	Texas A&M (34–18–1)	North Carolina (38–17)	Texas A&M (37–21–1)	West Virginia (38–22)	19.
20.	Auburn	Baylor (9–2)	Clemson (12–3)	Ole Miss (14–6)	TCU (15–7)	Coastal Carolina (20–8–1)	UC Irvine (21–5)	Clemson (25–11)	West Virginia (24–14)	West Virginia (26–15)	Arizona State (33–12)	LSU (31–21)	West Virginia (34–18)	Miami (FL) (39–18)	Miami (FL) (41–20)	20.
21.	Oklahoma State	Tennessee (12–0)	Tennessee (15–1)	East Carolina (15–6)	Florida State (17–6)	Florida (20–10)	UC Santa Barbara (23–5)	TCU (22–12)	Auburn (26–14)	Miami (FL) (31–14)	Oklahoma State (28–16)	West Virginia (31–18)	Tennessee (38–18)	Baylor (34–17)	Texas A&M (39–23–1)	21.
22.	Coastal Carolina	Texas A&M (11–2)	Texas A&M (15–3)	Tennessee (17–4)	Ole Miss (17–8)	UC Irvine (18–5)	Georgia Tech (22–10)	Tennessee (26–11)	Baylor (26–12)	Indiana (30–14)	Missouri (33–16–1)	Florida State (34–18)т	Illinois (36–17)	Tennessee (38–19)	UC Santa Barbara (45–11)	22.
23.	NC State	Arizona State (11–0)	South Carolina (13–3)	Clemson (14–5)	Tennessee (20–5)	Oklahoma (22–7)	TCU (20–10)	Auburn (24–12)	Oklahoma State (25–13)	Tennessee (31–14)	West Virginia (28–17)	Missouri (34–18–1)т	Ole Miss (33–23)	Creighton (38–11)	Oregon State (36–20–1)	23.
24.	Cal State	South Carolina (9–2)	East Carolina (12–5)	Michigan (13–4)	Florida (16–10)	UC Santa Barbara (19–5)	Baylor (22–8)	West Virginia (22–13)	Miami (FL) (27–14)	UC Irvine (28–10)	Tennessee (32–16)	Illinois (34–16)	Indiana (36–19)	Indiana (36–21)	NC State (42–19)	24.
25.	Michigan	East Carolina (8–4)	Michigan (9–4)	Oklahoma (16–4)	UC Irvine (15–4)	TCU (17–9)	Coastal Carolina (22–11–1)	Texas (23–15)	Indiana (27–13)	Florida State (28–15)т Missouri (30–15–1)т	Florida State (30–16)	Arizona State (35–14)	Dallas Baptist (38–16)	Dallas Baptist (41–18)	Creighton (41–13)	25.
	Preseason Jan 24	Week 3 Mar 4	Week 4 Mar 11	Week 5 Mar 18	Week 6 Mar 25	Week 7 Apr 1	Week 8 Apr 8	Week 9 Apr 15	Week 10 Apr 22	Week 11 Apr 29	Week 12 May 6	Week 13 May 13	Week 14 May 20	Week 15 May 27	Final June 27	
		Dropped: No. 17 TCU; No. 19 Clemson; No. 21 Oklahoma State; No. 24 Cal State	Dropped: No. 20 Baylor	Dropped: No. 23 South Carolina	Dropped: No. 23 Clemson; No. 24 Michigan	Dropped: No. 21 Florida State; No. 23 Tennessee	Dropped: No. 21 Florida; No. 23 Oklahoma	Dropped: No. 20 UC Irvine; No. 25 Coastal Carolina	Dropped: No. 20 Clemson; No. 21 TCU; No. 25 Texas	Dropped: No. 21 Auburn; No 23. Oklahoma State	Dropped: No. 22 Indiana; No. 24 UC Irvine	Dropped: No. 24 Tennessee	Dropped: No. 22 Missouri; No. 22 Florida State; No. 25 Arizona State	Dropped: No. 22 Illinois	Dropped: No. 21 Baylor; No. 22 Tennessee; No. 24 Indiana; No. 25 Dallas Baptist	

== Baseball America ==
	Preseason Jan 21	Week 1 Feb 18	Week 2 Feb 25	Week 3 Mar 4	Week 4 Mar 11	Week 5 Mar 18	Week 6 Mar 25	Week 7 Apr 1	Week 8 Apr 8	Week 9 Apr 15	Week 10 Apr 22	Week 11 Apr 29	Week 12 May 6	Week 13 May 13	Week 14 May 20	Week 15 May 26	Final Jun 27	
1.	Vanderbilt	Vanderbilt (2–1)	Vanderbilt (5–1)	Vanderbilt (9–2)	Vanderbilt (13–3)	UCLA (14–4)	UCLA (17–4)	UCLA (20–5)	UCLA (23–6)	UCLA (27–6)	UCLA (30–7)	UCLA (34–7)	UCLA (37–8)	UCLA (41–8)	UCLA (45–8)	UCLA (47–8)	Vanderbilt (59–12)	1.
2.	LSU	LSU (3–0)	LSU (7–0)	UCLA (9–2)	UCLA (11–3)	Mississippi State (18–2)	Mississippi State (22–3)	Stanford (18–3)	Stanford (20–5)	Stanford (24–5)	Stanford (27–6)	Stanford (31–7)	Vanderbilt (38–9)	Vanderbilt (41–10)	Vanderbilt (45–10)	Vanderbilt (49–10)	Michigan (50–22)	2.
3.	UCLA	UCLA (3–0)	UCLA (6–1)	North Carolina (11–1)	Stanford (12–3)	Stanford (12–3)	Stanford (15–3)	Vanderbilt (22–6)	Georgia (27–6)	Mississippi State (31–6)	Georgia (33–8)	Vanderbilt (34–9)	Stanford (34–8)	Stanford (37–8)	Stanford (39–10)	Stanford (41–11)	Louisville (51–18)	3.
4.	Florida	Florida (3–0)	North Carolina (7–0)	Stanford (9–2)	Florida (13–5)	Texas (15–7)	Vanderbilt (19–5)	NC State (27–2)	NC State (29–4)	Georgia (29–8)	Oregon State (28–8–1)	Oregon State (31–10–1)	Arkansas (37–12)	Arkansas (39–13)	Arkansas (40–15)	Arkansas (41–17)	Texas Tech (46–20)	4.
5.	North Carolina	North Carolina (3–0)	Florida (5–3)	Florida (9–4)	Florida State (13–1)	Vanderbilt (15–5)	NC State (23–1)	Mississippi State (24–5)	Mississippi State (27–6)	Oregon State (25–8–1)	Vanderbilt (31–9)	Arkansas (34–11)	Mississippi State (38–10)	Mississippi State (42–10)	Mississippi State (45–11)	Mississippi State (46–13)	Mississippi State (52–15)	5.
6.	Florida State	Florida State (3–0)	Florida State (7–0)	Florida State (10–0)	Oregon State (12–1–1)	NC State (19–1)	Georgia (21–3)	Georgia (23–5)	Vanderbilt (24–8)	Vanderbilt (27–9)	Arkansas (30–10)	Mississippi State (36–9)	Louisville (39–9)	Georgia (39–14)	Georgia (42–14)	Georgia (44–15)	UCLA (52–11)	6.
7.	Stanford	Stanford (3–0)	Stanford (6–1)	Oregon State (10–1)	Mississippi State (15–1)	Oregon State (14–3–1)	Texas (17–10)	Oregon State (19–5–1)	Oregon State (23–6–1)	Louisville (28–8)	Louisville (31–9)	Louisville (35–9)	Georgia (37–12)	East Carolina (39–12)	East Carolina (42–13)	Georgia Tech (41–17)	Florida State (42–23)	7.
8.	Texas Tech	Texas Tech (2–1)	Texas Tech (5–1)	Mississippi State (10–1)	North Carolina (11–4)	North Carolina (16–5)	Oregon State (16–4–1)	Texas (20–11)	Arkansas (24–8)	UC Santa Barbara (27–5)	UC Santa Barbara (30–5)	Georgia (33–12)	East Carolina (36–11)	Georgia Tech (35–15)	Georgia Tech (38–16)	East Carolina (43–15)	Arkansas (46–20)	8.
9.	Mississippi State	Mississippi State (3–0)	Mississippi State (6–1)	Texas (10–3)	Texas Tech (11–3)	Florida (15–7)	North Carolina (18–7)	North Carolina (22–7)	Texas (21–13)	NC State (29–8)	Mississippi State (32–9)	East Carolina (33–11)	Texas Tech (33–14)	Texas Tech (34–14)	Texas Tech (36–15)	Texas Tech (39–17)	Auburn (38–28)	9.
10.	Oregon State	Oregon State (3–0)	Oregon State (8–0)	LSU (8–3)	Texas (12–6)	Louisville (16–4)	Arkansas (20–4)	Arizona State (25–1)	East Carolina (24–7)	Arkansas (26–10)	Texas A&M (29–12–1)	Georgia Tech (30–14)	Georgia Tech (33–14)	Louisville (40–12)	Louisville (43–13)	Oklahoma State (36–18)	Stanford (45–14)	10.
11.	Louisville	East Carolina (3–0)	East Carolina (5–2)	Texas Tech (6–3)	LSU (11–4)	Georgia (14–2)	Texas Tech (15–6)	Texas Tech (18–7)	Texas Tech (21–9)	Texas A&M (27–10–1)	East Carolina (29–10)	Texas Tech (29–13)	Ole Miss (32–17)	Oregon State (33–15–1)	Oregon State (35–16–1)	Louisville (43–13)	Oklahoma State (40–21)	11.
12.	East Carolina	Louisville (1–2)	Louisville (5–2)	Ole Miss (8–2)	Ole Miss (12–3)	LSU (15–5)	Texas A&M (21–5)	Arkansas (22–6)	LSU (23–10)	East Carolina (25–10)	Georgia Tech (27–13)	LSU (29–16)	Oregon State (31–14–1)	UC Santa Barbara (40–7)	UC Santa Barbara (44–7)	Ole Miss (37–22)	East Carolina (47–18)	12.
13.	Ole Miss	Ole Miss (1–1)	Ole Miss (4–2)	Louisville (8–3)	Louisville (11–4)	Texas Tech (12–4)	East Carolina (18–6)	East Carolina (21–6)	Arizona State (26–4)	Georgia Tech (24–12)	Arizona State (30–8)	UC Santa Barbara (32–7)	UC Santa Barbara (36–7)	NC State (39–14)	NC State (41–15)	UC Santa Barbara (45–9)	Ole Miss (41–27)	13.
14.	Clemson	Clemson (2–1)	Clemson (6–1)	East Carolina (8–4)	East Carolina (12–5)	East Carolina (15–6)	Arizona State (22–1)	Texas A&M (23–6–1)	Texas A&M (25–8–1)	Arizona State (27–7)	LSU (26–15)	North Carolina (33–12)	North Carolina (34–12)	Miami (FL) (36–15)	Miami (FL) (38–17)	North Carolina (42–17)	North Carolina (46–19)	14.
15.	Georgia	Georgia (3–0)	Georgia (6–0)	Georgia (9–2)	Georgia (14–2)	Arkansas (17–2)	Florida (16–10)	LSU (19–9)	Ole Miss (23–10)	LSU (24–13)	Texas Tech (25–13)	Texas A&M (30–15–1)	Baylor (32–13)	Baylor (32–13)	Oklahoma State (32–17)	LSU (37–24)	LSU (40–26)	15.
16.	Baylor	Baylor (4–0)	Baylor (7–0)	Arkansas (9–1)	Arkansas (12–2)	Auburn (18–2)	Louisville (18–6)	Florida (20–10)	UC Irvine (21–5)	Texas Tech (23–11)	NC State (31–10)	Baylor (30–12)	LSU (30–18)	Oklahoma State (30–17)	LSU (34–22)	Oregon State (36–18–1)	Georgia (46–17)	16.
17.	Auburn	Arkansas (3–0)	Arkansas (5–1)	Auburn (9–2)	Auburn (14–2)	Texas A&M (17–5)	LSU (17–7)	Louisville (22–6)	Clemson (24–8)	North Carolina (27–10)	North Carolina (30–11)	West Virginia (26–15)	NC State (37–12)	Ole Miss (32–20)	Texas A&M (36–19–1)	West Virginia (37–20)	Georgia Tech (43–19)	17.
18.	Arkansas	Auburn (2–1)	Auburn (6–2)	Michigan (8–1)	Clemson (12–3)	Ole Miss (14–6)	Auburn (20–4)	Auburn (22–6)	Georgia Tech (22–10)	Ole Miss (25–12)	West Virginia (25–13)	Ole Miss (30–15)	Miami (FL) (34–14)	Texas A&M (34–18–1)	Baylor (33–15)	NC State (42–17)	Duke (35–27)	18.
19.	Texas	Texas (2–1)	Texas (6–2)	Coastal Carolina (10–2)	Coastal Carolina (13–3–1)	Coastal Carolina (16–4–1)	UC Irvine (15–4)	UC Irvine (18–5)	UC Santa Barbara (23–5)	Baylor (24–10)	UC Irvine (25–9)	UC Irvine (28–10)	Texas A&M (32–17–1)	West Virginia (31–18)	West Virginia (34–18)	Miami (FL) (39–18)	Oregon State (36–20–1)	19.
20.	Michigan	Michigan (3–0)	Michigan (6–0)	South Carolina (9–2)	South Carolina (13–3)	Arizona State (19–0)	Coastal Carolina (18–5–1)	Ole Miss (20–9)	Louisville (24–8)	Texas (23–15)	Auburn (26–14)	Arizona State (32–10)	Missouri (33–16–1)	North Carolina (36–15)	Indiana (36–19)	Texas A&M (37–21–1)	West Virginia (38–22)	20.
21.	Southern Miss	Southern Miss (3–0)	Coastal Carolina (7–1)	Clemson (8–3)	NC State (15–0)	Florida State (14–4)	Florida State (17–6)	Clemson (22–6)	North Carolina (23–9)	UC Irvine (21–9)	Tennessee (30–11)	NC State (33–12)	West Virginia (28–17)	Missouri (34–18–1)	Ole Miss (33–23)	Fresno State (38–14–1)	Fresno State (40–16–1)	21.
22.	Duke	Duke (3–0)	Duke (6–1)	Duke (9–2)	UC Irvine (9–4)	UC Irvine (12–4)	Ole Miss (17–8)	UConn (17–9)	Auburn (23–9)	TCU (22–12)	Oklahoma State (25–13)	Indiana (30–14)	Oklahoma State (28–16)	LSU (31–21)	Dallas Baptist (38–16)	Baylor (34–17)	Miami (FL) (41–20)	22.
23.	Coastal Carolina	Coastal Carolina (3–0)	Southern Miss (4–2)	NC State (11–0)	Michigan (9–4)	Michigan (13–4)	TCU (15–7)	Oklahoma State (18–8)	TCU (20–10)	Clemson (25–11)	Ole Miss (27–14)	Miami (FL) (31–14)	Michigan (34–11)	Dallas Baptist (36–15)	Fresno State (35–14–1)	Creighton (38–11)	Texas A&M (39–23–1)	23.
24.	Minnesota	TCU (2–1)	TCU (5–2)	UC Irvine (7–3)	Duke (11–5)	South Carolina (14–6)	Clemson (18–6)	UC Santa Barbara (19–5)	Michigan (22–8)	Auburn (24–12)	Baylor (26–12)	Missouri (30–15–1)	Arizona State (33–12)	BYU (33–14)	BYU (36–15)	Indiana (36–21)	UC Santa Barbara (45–11)	24.
25.	UC Irvine	UC Irvine (2–1)	UC Irvine (5–2)	Baylor (9–2)	Tennessee (15–1)	Clemson (14–5)	Oklahoma (21–4)	Coastal Carolina (20–8–1)	Baylor (22–8)	West Virginia (22–13)	Indiana (27–13)	BYU (29–10)	BYU (31–12)	Fresno State (32–14–1)	Creighton (35–11)	Indiana State (41–16)	Creighton (41–13)	25.
	Preseason Jan 21	Week 1 Feb 18	Week 2 Feb 25	Week 3 Mar 4	Week 4 Mar 11	Week 5 Mar 18	Week 6 Mar 25	Week 7 Apr 1	Week 8 Apr 8	Week 9 Apr 15	Week 10 Apr 22	Week 11 Apr 29	Week 12 May 6	Week 13 May 13	Week 14 May 20	Week 15 May 26	Final Jun 27	
		Dropped: No. 25 Minnesota	None	Dropped: No. 23 Southern Miss; No. 24 TCU	Dropped: No. 25 Baylor	Dropped: No. 24 Duke; No. 25 Tennessee	Dropped: No. 23 Michigan; No. 24 South Carolina	Dropped: No. 21 Florida State; No. 23 TCU; No. 25 Oklahoma	Dropped: No. 16 Florida; No. 22 UConn; No. 23 Oklahoma State; No. 25 Coastal Carolina	Dropped: No. 24 Michigan	Dropped: No. 20 Texas; No. 22 TCU; No. 23 Clemson	Dropped: No. 20 Auburn; No. 21 Tennessee; No. 22 Oklahoma State	Dropped: No. 19 UC Irvine; No. 22 Indiana	Dropped: No. 23 Michigan; No. 24 Arizona State	Dropped: No. 20 North Carolina; No. 21 Missouri	Dropped: No. 22 Dallas Baptist; No. 24 BYU	Dropped: No. 18 NC State; No. 22 Baylor; No. 24 Indiana; No. 25 Indiana State	

== Collegiate Baseball ==
	Preseason Dec 18	Week 1 Feb 18	Week 2 Feb 25	Week 3 Mar 4	Week 4 Mar 11	Week 5 Mar 18	Week 6 Mar 25	Week 7 Apr 1	Week 8 Apr 8	Week 9 Apr 15	Week 10 Apr 22	Week 11 Apr 29	Week 12 May 6	Week 13 May 13	Week 14 May 20	Week 15 May 27	Week 16 Jun 4	Week 17 Jun 10	Final Jun 27	
1.	LSU	LSU (3–0)	LSU (7–0)	Florida State (10–0)	Florida State (13–1)	NC State (19–1)	NC State (23–1)	NC State (27–2)	UCLA (23–6)	UCLA (27–6)	UCLA (30–7)	UCLA (34–7)	UCLA (37–8)	UCLA (41–8)	UCLA (45–8)	UCLA (47–8)	UCLA (51–9)	Vanderbilt (54–11)	Vanderbilt (59–12)	1.
2.	Vanderbilt	Vanderbilt (2–1)	Vanderbilt (5–1)	Vanderbilt (9–2)	NC State (15–0)	Mississippi State (18–2)	UCLA (17–4)	Arizona State (25–1)	NC State (29–4)	Stanford (24–5)	Stanford (27–6)	Vanderbilt (34–9)	Vanderbilt (38–9)	Vanderbilt (41–10)	Vanderbilt (45–10)	Vanderbilt (49–10)	Vanderbilt (52–10)	Arkansas (46–18)	Michigan (50–22)	2.
3.	UCLA	UCLA (3–0)	UCLA (6–1)	Oregon State (10–1)	Oregon State (12–1–1)	UCLA (14–4)	Arizona State (22–1)	UCLA (20–5)	Stanford (20–5)	Mississippi State (31–6)	Oregon State (28–8–1)	Stanford (31–7)	Louisville (39–9)	Stanford (37–9)	Stanford (39–10)	Stanford (41–11)	Stanford (45–12)	Mississippi State (51–13)	Louisville (51–18)	3.
4.	Texas Tech	Texas Tech (2–1)	Texas Tech (5–1)	North Carolina (11–1)	Vanderbilt (13–3)	Oregon State (14–3–1)	Mississippi State (22–3)	Stanford (18–3)	Georgia (27–6)	Oregon State (25–8–1)	Georgia (33–8)	Louisville (35–9)	Stanford (34–8)	Arkansas (39–13)	UC Santa Barbara (44–7)	Arkansas (41–17)	Arkansas (44–17)	Louisville (49–16)	Texas Tech (46–20)	4.
5.	Stanford	Stanford (3–0)	Oregon State (8–0)	NC State (11–0)	Mississippi State (15–1)	Arizona State (19–0)	Vanderbilt (19–5)	Vanderbilt (22–6)	Oregon State (23–6–1)	Georgia (29–8)	Vanderbilt (31–9)	Oregon State (31–10–1)	Arkansas (37–12)	Mississippi State (42–10)	Arkansas (40–15)	Mississippi State (46–13)	Mississippi State (49–13)	Texas Tech (44–18)	Mississippi State (52–15)	5.
6.	Florida	Florida (3–0)	North Carolina (7–0)	UCLA (9–2)	UCLA (11–3)	Vanderbilt (15–5)	Stanford (15–3)	Oregon State (19–5–1)	Vanderbilt (24–8)	Vanderbilt (27–9)	UC Santa Barbara (30–5)	Arkansas (34–11)	Mississippi State (38–10)	UC Santa Barbara (40–7)	Mississippi State (45–11)	Georgia (44–15)	Louisville (47–16)	Florida State (41–21)	Florida State (42–23)	6.
7.	Oregon State	Oregon State (3–0)	Florida State (7–0)	Texas (10–3)	Texas Tech (11–3)	LSU (15–5)	Oregon State (16–4–1)	Georgia (23–5)	Arkansas (24–8)	UC Santa Barbara (27–5)	Louisville (31–9)	Mississippi State (36–9)	UC Santa Barbara (36–7)	Louisville (40–12)	Louisville (43–13)	Louisville (43–15)	Oklahoma State (39–19)	Auburn (38–26)	Arkansas (46–20)	7.
8.	North Carolina	North Carolina (3–0)	Stanford (6–1)	Mississippi State (10–1)	Stanford (12–3)	Stanford (12–3)	Georgia (21–3)	Arkansas (22–6)	LSU (23–10)	Louisville (28–8)	Arkansas (30–10)	UC Santa Barbara (32–7)	Georgia (37–12)	East Carolina (39–12)	Georgia (42–14)	UC Santa Barbara (45–9)	East Carolina (47–16)	Michigan (46–20)	Auburn (38–28)	8.
9.	Louisville	Florida State (4–0)	Georgia (6–0)	LSU (8–3)	Arizona State (15–0)	Georgia (18–2)	Arkansas (20–4)	LSU (19–9)	Arizona State (26–4)	Arkansas (26–10)	Mississippi State (32–9)	Georgia (33–12)	East Carolina (36–11)	Georgia (39–14)	East Carolina (42–13)	Oklahoma State (36–18)	Texas Tech (42–17)	UCLA (52–11)	UCLA (52–11)	9.
10.	Florida State	Coastal Carolina (3–0)	NC State (7–0)	Texas Tech (6–3)	LSU (11–4)	Arkansas (17–2)	Coastal Carolina (18–5–1)	Mississippi State (24–5)	Mississippi State (27–6)	Texas A&M (27–10–1)	Arizona State (30–8)	East Carolina (33–11)	North Carolina (34–12)	Oregon State (33–15–1)	Oregon State (35–16–1)	East Carolina (43–15)	North Carolina (45–17)	Stanford (45–14)	Stanford (45–14)	10.
11.	Ole Miss	Georgia (3–0)	Coastal Carolina (7–1)	Stanford (9–2)	Coastal Carolina (13–1–1)	Coastal Carolina (16–4–1)	Texas A&M (21–5)	Texas A&M (23–6–1)	East Carolina (24–7)	NC State (29–8)	East Carolina (29–10)	North Carolina (33–12)	Oregon State (31–14–1)	Georgia Tech (35–15)	Georgia Tech (38–16)	Georgia Tech (41–17)	LSU (40–24)	Oklahoma State (40–21)	Oklahoma State (40–21)	11.
12.	Coastal Carolina	Louisville (1–2)	Louisville (5–2)	Coastal Carolina (10–2)	Clemson (12–3)	Auburn (18–2)	LSU (17–7)	East Carolina (21–6)	Texas A&M (25–8–1)	Arizona State (27–7)	North Carolina (30–11)	Arizona State (32–10)	Georgia Tech (33–14)	Miami (FL) (36–15)	Texas Tech (36–15)	Oregon State (36–18–1)	Florida State (39–21)	North Carolina (46–19)	North Carolina (46–19)	12.
13.	Georgia	Ole Miss (1–1)	Florida (5–3)	Louisville (8–3)	Georgia (14–2)	Florida (15–7)	Auburn (20–4)	Clemson (22–6)	Clemson (24–8)	East Carolina (25–10)	Texas A&M (29–12–1)	LSU (29–16)	Ole Miss (32–17)	North Carolina (36–15)	Oklahoma State (32–17)	Texas Tech (39–17)	Ole Miss (40–25)	Ole Miss (41–27)	Ole Miss (41–27)	13.
14.	Texas	Texas (2–1)	Baylor (7–0)	Florida (9–4)	North Carolina (12–4)	Florida State (14–4)	Texas Tech (15–5)	Auburn (22–6)	UC Santa Barbara (23–5)	North Carolina (27–10)	NC State (31–10)	Georgia Tech (30–14)	Baylor (32–13)	Baylor (32–13)	NC State (41–15)	North Carolina (42–17)	Auburn (36–25)	LSU (40–26)	LSU (40–26)	14.
15.	Clemson	Clemson (2–1)	Clemson (6–1)	Georgia (9–2)	Louisville (11–4)	Louisville (16–4)	Clemson (18–6)	Texas Tech (18–7)	UC Irvine (21–5)	LSU (24–13)	LSU (26–15)	Baylor (30–12)	Texas Tech (33–14)	Texas Tech (34–14)	Miami (FL) (38–17)	NC State (42–17)	Duke (34–25)	East Carolina (47–18)	East Carolina (47–18)	15.
16.	Oklahoma State	TCU (2–1)	Mississippi State (6–1)	Arkansas (9–1)	Florida (13–5)	North Carolina (16–5)	East Carolina (18–6)	Louisville (22–6)	Ole Miss (23–10)	Clemson (25–11)	Oklahoma State (23–15)	Texas Tech (29–13)	Oklahoma State (28–16)	Oklahoma State (30–17)	Baylor (33–15)	Central Michigan (46–12)	Michigan (44–19)	Duke (35–27)	Duke (35–27)	16.
17.	Georgia Tech	Cal State Fullerton (2–1)	Ole Miss (4–2)	Arizona State (11–0)	Arkansas (12–2)	Texas (15–7)	UC Santa Barbara (17–3)	North Carolina (22–7)	Baylor (22–8)	Ole Miss (25–12)	Georgia Tech (27–13)	Ole Miss (30–15)	Arizona State (33–12)	Florida State (34–18)	North Carolina (38–17)	Baylor (34–17)	Georgia (46–17)	Georgia (46–17)	Georgia (46–17)	17.
18.	Cal State Fullerton	Oklahoma State (2–1)	Texas (6–2)	Ole Miss (8–2)	South Carolina (13–3)	Texas Tech (12–5)	UC Irvine (15–4)	Coastal Carolina (20–8–1)	Georgia Tech (22–10)	Baylor (24–10)	Louisiana Tech (27–12)	UC Irvine (28–10)	LSU (30–18)	Ole Miss (32–20)	Central Michigan (43–12)	Miami (FL) (39–18)	UC Santa Barbara (45–11)	UC Santa Barbara (45–11)	UC Santa Barbara (45–11)	18.
19.	TCU	Georgia Tech (2–1)	TCU (5–2)	South Carolina (9–2)	Ole Miss (12–3)	Texas A&M (17–5)	Florida (16–10)	UC Santa Barbara (19–5)	Texas Tech (21–9)	Georgia Tech (24–12)	UC Irvine (25–9)	Texas A&M (30–15–1)	Michigan (34–11)	Arizona State (35–14)	Florida State (35–20)	LSU (37–24)	Georgia Tech (43–19)	Georgia Tech (43–19)	Georgia Tech (43–19)	19.
20.	Duke	Duke (3–0)	Cal State Fullerton (4–2)	Clemson (8–3)	Texas (12–6)	Clemson (14–5)	Florida State (17–6)	Florida (20–10)	Louisville (24–8)	TCU (22–12)	UT-Arlington (28–13)	NC State (33–12)	NC State (37–12)	LSU (31–21)	Arizona State (36–15)	Florida State (36–21)	Oregon State (36–20–1)	Oregon State (36–20–1)	Oregon State (36–20–1)	20.
21.	Baylor	Baylor (4–0)	Duke (6–1)	Baylor (9–2)	Texas A&M (15–3)	East Carolina (15–6)	Louisville (18–6)	UC Irvine (18–5)	North Carolina (23–9)	Louisiana Tech (24–11)	Texas Tech (25–13)	Oklahoma State (25–16)	Texas A&M (32–17–1)	Indiana (33–18)	LSU (34–22)	Arizona State (37–17)	NC State (42–19)	NC State (42–19)	NC State (42–19)	21.
22.	NC State	NC State (3–0)	Arkansas (5–1)	Duke (9–2)	Tennessee (15–1)	UC Santa Barbara (14–3)	North Carolina (18–7)	Baylor (20–7)	TCU (20–10)	Miami (FL) (25–12)	Ole Miss (27–14)	Michigan (31–11)	Miami (FL) (34–14)	Michigan (37–13)	Indiana (36–19)	West Virginia (37–20)	Central Michigan (47–14)	Central Michigan (47–14)	Central Michigan (47–14)	22.
23.	Auburn	Arkansas (3–0)	Texas A&M (7–1)	Texas A&M (11–2)	Auburn (14–2)	Illinois (13–3)	Illinois (17–4)	Oklahoma State (18–8)	Auburn (23–9)	Texas Tech (23–11)	Baylor (26–12)	Indiana (30–14)	Florida State (30–16)	Texas A&M (34–18–1)	Texas A&M (36–19–1)	Fresno State (38–14–1)	Baylor (35–19)	Baylor (35–19)	Baylor (35–19)	23.
24.	Missouri State	Arizona (4–0)	Arizona State (7–0)	Tennessee (12–0)	San Diego (12–4)	UC Irvine (12–4)	Oklahoma (21–4)	BYU (21–5)	Florida Atlantic (23–9)	UC Irvine (21–9)	Indiana (27–13)	Miami (FL) (31–14)	Florida Atlantic (32–15)	Central Michigan (39–12)	West Virginia (34–18)	Indiana (36–21)	Miami (FL) (41–20)	Miami (FL) (41–20)	Miami (FL) (41–20)	24.
25.	Arkansas	Mississippi State (3–0)	Michigan (6–0)	Oklahoma (11–1)	UC Santa Barbara (11–2)	Oklahoma (16–4)	Baylor (16–6)	TCU (17–9)	Coastal Carolina (22–11–1)	Florida (24–14)	Duke (24–16)	Florida State (28–15)	Indiana (31–16)	NC State (39–14)	Fresno State (35–14–1)	Texas A&M (37–21–1)	Fresno State (40–16–1)	Fresno State (40–16–1)	Fresno State (40–16–1)	25.
26.	Arizona	Auburn (2–1)	Illinois (6–0)	Michigan (8–1)	Alabama (15–2)	Baylor (13–5)	Washington (14–5)	Texas (20–11)	Texas (21–13)	Florida State (22–13)	Miami (FL) (27–14)	Duke (27–17)	Iowa (29–17)	West Virginia (31–18)	Tennessee (38–18)	Cal (32–18)	Texas A&M (39–23–1)	Texas A&M (39–23–1)	Texas A&M (39–23–1)	26.
27.	Mississippi State	UConn (2–1)	Sam Houston State (5–1)	Auburn (9–2)	Baylor (10–4)	San Diego (14–6)	Southern Miss (15–6)	Georgia Tech (19–9)	Michigan (22–8)	Florida Atlantic (24–11)	Florida State (24–14)	BYU (29–10)	Duke (28–18)	Dallas Baptist (36–15)	Cal (30–18)	Creighton (38–11)	West Virginia (38–22)	West Virginia (38–22)	West Virginia (38–22)	27.
28.	Minnesota	Texas A&M (3–0)	Oklahoma State (5–2)	Miami (FL) (9–2)	Miami (FL) (12–3)	Ole Miss (14–6)	TCU (15–7)	Ball State (17–9)	Central Michigan (23–8)	Miami (OH) (29–6)	Florida Atlantic (27–12)	West Virginia (26–15)	Central Michigan (34–12)	Fresno State (32–14–1)	Dallas Baptist (38–16)	Southern Miss (38–19)	Southern Miss (40–21)	Southern Miss (40–21)	Southern Miss (40–21)	28.
29.	Texas A&M	Southern Miss (3–0)	Auburn (6–2)	Washington (7–2)	Illinois (10–3)	Miami (FL) (15–5)	Georgia Tech (16–8)	Arkansas State (19–9)	Sam Houston State (20–9)	UT-Arlington (24–13)	BYU (26–10)	Southern Miss (29–13)	Fresno State (30–13–1)	Florida Atlantic (34–17)	Florida Atlantic (37–18)	Ole Miss (37–25)	Arizona State (38–19)	Arizona State (38–19)	Arizona State (38–19)	29.
30.	Southern Miss	Miami (FL) (3–0)	South Carolina (6–1)	Illinois (7–2)	East Carolina (12–5)	Michigan (13–4)	San Diego (17–7)	Florida Atlantic (19–9)	Southern Miss (20–9)	Nebraska (20–10)	West Virginia (24–14)	Texas State (31–13)	BYU (31–12)	BYU (33–14)	BYU (36–15)	Indiana State (41–16)	Creighton (41–13)	Creighton (41–13)	Creighton (41–13)	30.
	Preseason Dec 18	Week 1 Feb 18	Week 2 Feb 25	Week 3 Mar 4	Week 4 Mar 11	Week 5 Mar 18	Week 6 Mar 25	Week 7 Apr 1	Week 8 Apr 8	Week 9 Apr 15	Week 10 Apr 22	Week 11 Apr 29	Week 12 May 6	Week 13 May 13	Week 14 May 20	Week 15 May 27	Week 16 Jun 4	Week 17 Jun 10	Final Jun 27	
		Dropped: No. 24 Missouri State; No. 28 Minnesota	Dropped: No. 21 Baylor; No. 24 Arizona; No. 27 UConn; No. 29 Southern Miss; No. 30 Miami (FL)	Dropped: No. 19 TCU; No. 20 Cal State Fullerton; No. 27 Sam Houston State; No. 28 Oklahoma State	Dropped: No. 22 Duke; No. 25 Oklahoma; No. 26 Michigan; No. 29 Washington	Dropped: No. 22 Tennessee; No. 26 Alabama; No. 29 Illinois	Dropped: No. 17 Texas; No. 28 Ole Miss; No. 29 Miami (FL); No. 30 Michigan	Dropped: No. 20 Florida State; No. 23 Illinois; No. 24 Oklahoma; No. 26 Washington; No. 27 Southern Miss; No. 30 San Diego	Dropped: No. 20 Florida; No. 23 Oklahoma State; No. 24 BYU; No. 28 Ball State; No. 29 Arkansas State	Dropped: No. 23 Auburn; No. 25 Coastal Carolina; No. 26 Texas; No. 27 Michigan; No. 28 Central Michigan; No. 29 Sam Houston State; No. 30 Southern Miss	Dropped: No. 16 Clemson; No. 20 TCU; No. 25 Florida; No. 28 Miami (OH); No. 30 Nebraska	Dropped: No. 18 Louisiana Tech; No. 20 UT-Arlington; No. 28 Florida Atlantic	Dropped: No. 18 UC Irvine; No. 28 West Virginia; No. 29 Southern Miss; No. 30 Texas State	Dropped: No. 26 Iowa; No. 27 Duke	Dropped: No. 18 Ole Miss; No. 22 Michigan	Dropped: No. 26 Tennessee; No. 28 Dallas Baptist; No. 29 Florida Atlantic; No. 30 BYU	Dropped: No. 24 Indiana; No. 26 Cal; No. 30 Indiana State	Dropped: None	Dropped: None	

The Preseason poll ranked the top 40 teams in the nation. Teams not listed above are: 31. Oregon; 32. UConn; 33. Miami (FL); 34. Illinois; 35. East Carolina; 36. Arizona State; 37. Stetson; 38. Louisiana; 39 Michigan; 40. Sam Houston State.

== NCBWA ==
	Preseason Feb 4	Week 1 Feb 18	Week 2 Feb 25	Week 3 Mar 4	Week 4 Mar 11	Week 5 Mar 18	Week 6 Mar 25	Week 7 Apr 1	Week 8 Apr 8	Week 9 Apr 15	Week 10 Apr 22	Week 11 Apr 29	Week 12 May 6	Week 13 May 13	Week 14 May 20	Week 15 May 27	Final Jun 27	
1.	Vanderbilt	LSU (3–0)	LSU (7–0)	Vanderbilt (9–2)	Vanderbilt (13–3)	UCLA (14–4)	UCLA (17–4)	UCLA (20–5)	UCLA (23–6)	UCLA (27–6)	UCLA (30–7)	UCLA (34–7)	UCLA (37–8)	UCLA (41–8)	UCLA (45–8)	UCLA (47–8)	Vanderbilt (59–12)	1.
2.	LSU	Vanderbilt (2–1)	Vanderbilt (5–1)	Oregon State (10–1)	Oregon State (12–1–1)	Mississippi State (18–2)	Stanford (15–3)	Stanford (18–3)	Oregon State (23–6–1)	Stanford (24–5)	Stanford (27–6)	Stanford (31–7)т	Vanderbilt (38–9)	Vanderbilt (41–10)	Vanderbilt (45–10)	Vanderbilt (49–10)	Michigan (50–22)	2.
3.	Texas Tech	UCLA (3–0)	Oregon State (8–0)	UCLA (9–2)	Stanford (12–3)	Stanford (12–3)	Mississippi State (22–3)	Vanderbilt (22–6)	Georgia (27–6)	Mississippi State (31–6)	Oregon State (28–8–1)	Vanderbilt (34–9)т	Stanford (34–8)	Stanford (37–9)	Stanford (39–10)	Stanford (41–11)	Louisville (51–18)	3.
4.	UCLA	Florida (3–0)	UCLA (6–1)	North Carolina (11–1)	UCLA (11–3)	Oregon State (14–3–1)	Vanderbilt (19–5)	Oregon State (19–5–1)	Stanford (20–5)	Oregon State (25–8–1)	Vanderbilt (31–9)	Oregon State (31–10–1)	Louisville (39–9)	Mississippi State (42–10)	Mississippi State (45–11)	Georgia (44–15)	Texas Tech (46–20)	4.
5.	Oregon State	Oregon State (3–0)	North Carolina (7–0)	Stanford (9–2)	Mississippi State (15–1)	Vanderbilt (15–5)	Georgia (21–3)	NC State (27–2)	Mississippi State (27–6)т	Vanderbilt (27–9)	Georgia (33–8)	Louisville (35–9)	Arkansas (37–12)	Arkansas (39–13)	Georgia (42–14)	Mississippi State (46–13)	Mississippi State (52–15)	5.
6.	Florida	Texas Tech (2–1)	Texas Tech (5–1)	Florida (9–4)	Florida (13–5)	Georgia (18–2)	NC State (23–1)	Arizona State (25–1)	NC State (29–4)т	Georgia (29–8)	Louisville (31–9)	Arkansas (34–11)	Mississippi State (38–10)	East Carolina (39–12)	Arkansas (40–15)	Texas Tech (39–17)	Florida State (42–23)	6.
7.	North Carolina	North Carolina (3–0)	Georgia (6–0)	Mississippi State (10–1)	Florida State (13–1)	Louisville (16–4)	Oregon State (16–4–1)	Georgia (23–5)	Vanderbilt (24–8)	Louisville (28–8)	Arkansas (30–10)	Mississippi State (36–9)	Georgia (37–12)	Georgia Tech (35–15)	Texas Tech (36–15)	Georgia Tech (41–17)	Arkansas (46–20)	7.
8.	Stanford	Stanford (3–0)	Florida State (7–0)	Florida State (10–0)	Texas Tech (11–3)	Arkansas (17–2)	Arkansas (20–4)	Louisville (22–6)	LSU (23–10)	Arkansas (26–10)	UC Santa Barbara (30–5)	East Carolina (33–11)	East Carolina (36–11)	Texas Tech (34–14)	East Carolina (42–13)	Arkansas (41–17)	Auburn (38–28)	8.
9.	Louisville	Florida State (4–0)	Florida (5–3)	LSU (8–3)	Georgia (14–2)	LSU (15–5)	Arizona State (22–1)	Mississippi State (24–5)	Arkansas (24–8)	Texas A&M (27–10–1)	Texas A&M (29–12–1)	Georgia (33–12)	Texas Tech (33–14)	Georgia (39–14)	Georgia Tech (38–16)	Oklahoma State (36–18)	UCLA (52–11)	9.
10.	Florida State	Georgia (3–0)	Stanford (6–1)	Georgia (9–2)	LSU (11–4)	NC State (19–1)	Louisville (18–6)т	Arkansas (22–6)	East Carolina (24–7)	UC Santa Barbara (27–5)	Mississippi State (32–9)	Texas Tech (29–13)	Georgia Tech (33–14)	Louisville (40–12)	Louisville (43–13)	Louisville (43–15)	Stanford (45–14)	10.
11.	Ole Miss	East Carolina (3–0)	Mississippi State (6–1)	Texas Tech (6–3)	Louisville (11–4)	Texas (15–7)	Texas Tech (15–6)т	LSU (19–9)	Texas Tech (21–9)	NC State (29–8)	East Carolina (29–10)	North Carolina (33–12)	North Carolina (34–12)	UC Santa Barbara (40–7)	UC Santa Barbara (44–7)	East Carolina (43–15)	Oklahoma State (40–21)	11.
12.	Georgia	Mississippi State (3–0)	Baylor (7–0)	Texas (10–3)	Ole Miss (12–3)	Arizona State (19–0)	Texas A&M (21–5)	Texas Tech (18–7)	Louisville (24–8)	North Carolina (27–10)	North Carolina (30–11)	Georgia Tech (30–14)	Oregon State (31–14–1)	Oregon State (33–15–1)	Oregon State (35–16–1)	Oregon State (36–18–1)	Ole Miss (41–27)	12.
13.	Mississippi State	Arkansas (3–0)	Arkansas (5–1)	Louisville (8–3)	Arkansas (12–2)	Texas Tech (12–5)	Auburn (20–4)	Texas (20–11)	Texas A&M (25–8–1)	LSU (24–13)	Arizona State (30–8)	UC Santa Barbara (32–7)	UC Santa Barbara (36–7)	Baylor (32–13)	Oklahoma State (32–17)	North Carolina (42–17)	East Carolina (47–18)	13.
14.	East Carolina	Louisville (1–2)	Louisville (5–2)	Arkansas (9–1)	North Carolina (12–4)	Auburn (18–2)	LSU (17–7)	North Carolina (22–7)	Arizona State (26–4)	East Carolina (25–10)	LSU (26–15)	LSU (29–16)	Baylor (32–13)	Oklahoma State (30–17)	Texas A&M (36–19–1)	UC Santa Barbara (45–9)	North Carolina (46–19)	14.
15.	Arkansas	Baylor (4–0)	East Carolina (5–2)	Ole Miss (8–2)	Texas (12–6)	North Carolina (16–5)	North Carolina (18–7)	East Carolina (21–6)	Ole Miss (23–10)	Arizona State (27–7)	NC State (31–10)	Baylor (30–12)	Ole Miss (32–17)	Miami (FL) (36–15)	NC State (41–15)	West Virginia (37–20)	LSU (40–26)	15.
16.	Baylor	Ole Miss (1–1)	Clemson (6–1)	Michigan (8–1)	Coastal Carolina (13–3–1)	Florida (15–7)	Coastal Carolina (18–5–1)	Texas A&M (23–6–1)	UC Irvine (21–5)	Texas Tech (23–11)	Georgia Tech (27–13)	Ole Miss (30–15)	LSU (30–18)	Texas A&M (34–18–1)	Miami (FL) (38–17)	LSU (37–24)	Georgia (46–17)	16.
17.	Clemson	Clemson (2–1)	Ole Miss (4–2)	Coastal Carolina (10–2)	Auburn (14–2)	Florida State (14–4)	Texas (17–10)	Auburn (22–6)	Clemson (24–8)	Ole Miss (25–12)	Texas Tech (25–13)	Texas A&M (30–15–1)	Miami (FL) (34–14)	North Carolina (36–15)	Baylor (33–15)	Ole Miss (37–25)	Duke (35–27)	17.
18.	Texas	TCU (2–1)	Michigan (6–0)	Auburn (9–2)	NC State (15–0)	Coastal Carolina (16–4–1)	East Carolina (18–6)	Florida (20–10)	Texas (21–13)	Georgia Tech (24–12)	Baylor (26–12)	Arizona State (32–10)	Texas A&M (32–17–1)	NC State (39–14)	West Virginia (34–18)	Texas A&M (37–21–1)	Georgia Tech (43–19)	18.
19.	Auburn	Coastal Carolina (3–0)	Coastal Carolina (7–1)	East Carolina (8–4)	East Carolina (12–5)	Texas A&M (17–5)	Florida State (17–6)	Ole Miss (20–9)	North Carolina (23–9)	Baylor (24–10)	Ole Miss (27–14)	West Virginia (26–15)	NC State (37–12)	Ole Miss (32–20)	LSU (34–22)	NC State (42–17)	West Virginia (38–22)	19.
20.	Oklahoma State	Texas (2–1)	Texas (6–2)	NC State (11–0)	Arizona State (15–0)	Ole Miss (14–6)	UC Irvine (15–4)	Clemson (22–6)	UC Santa Barbara (23–5)	TCU (22–12)	West Virginia (24–14)	Miami (FL) (31–14)	Oklahoma State (28–16)	West Virginia (31–18)	North Carolina (38–17)	Miami (FL) (39–18)	Texas A&M (39–23–1)	20.
21.	TCU	Michigan (3–0)	Oklahoma State (5–2)	Baylor (9–2)	Clemson (12–3)	East Carolina (15–6)	TCU (15–7)	UC Irvine (18–5)	TCU (20–10)	Clemson (25–11)	Tennessee (30–11)	NC State (33–12)	West Virginia (28–17)	LSU (31–21)	Tennessee (38–18)	Baylor (34–17)	Oregon State (36–20–1)	21.
22.	Coastal Carolina	Auburn (2–1)	Auburn (6–2)	Tennessee (12–0)	Texas A&M (15–3)	Michigan (13–4)	Florida (16–10)	Coastal Carolina (20–8–1)	Auburn (23–9)	Tennessee (26–11)	Miami (FL) (27–14)	UC Irvine (28–10)	Arizona State (33–12)т	Florida State (34–18)	Illinois (36–17)	Creighton (38–11)	UC Santa Barbara (45–11)	22.
23.	Michigan	Oklahoma State (2–1)	TCU (5–2)	Arizona State (11–0)	Tennessee (15–1)	UC Irvine (12–4)	Oklahoma (21–4)	TCU (17–9)	Baylor (22–8)	West Virginia (22–13)	Auburn (26–14)	Indiana (30–14)	Missouri (33–16–1)т	Tennessee (35–17)	Dallas Baptist (38–16)	Fresno State (38–14–1)	Tennessee (40–21)	23.
24.	Cal State	Cal State Fullerton (2–1)	Cal State Fullerton (4–2)	Clemson (8–3)	South Carolina (13–3)	TCU (12–6)	Clemson (18–6)	UC Santa Barbara (19–5)	Georgia Tech (22–10)	Miami (FL) (25–12)	UC Irvine (25–9)	Tennessee (31–14)	Michigan (34–11)	Missouri (34–18–1)	Ole Miss (33–23)	Cal (32–18)	Miami (FL) (41–20)	24.
25.	Duke	Duke (3–0)	Duke (6–1)	Duke (9–2)	TCU (9–5)	Clemson (14–5)	Ole Miss (17–8)	Oklahoma State (18–8)	Michigan (22–8)	Texas (23–15)	Oklahoma State (25–13)	BYU (29–10)	Florida State (30–16)	Illinois (34–16)	Indiana (36–19)	Tennessee (38–19)	Baylor (35–19)т	25.
26.	Southern Miss	Southern Miss (3–0)	Arizona State (7–0)	Texas A&M (11–2)	Michigan (9–4)	Oklahoma (16–4)	Illinois (17–4)	Baylor (20–7)	Coastal Carolina (22–11–1)	Auburn (24–12)	Indiana (27–13)	Michigan (31–11)	BYU (31–12)	Arizona State (35–14)	BYU (36–15)	Dallas Baptist (41–18)	Creighton (41–13)т	26.
27.	Minnesota	Wake Forest (2–1)	Tennessee (7–0)	South Carolina (9–2)	UC Irvine (9–4)	Tennessee (17–4)	UC Santa Barbara (17–3)	Florida State (18–9)	Florida Atlantic (23–9)	Missouri (25–12–1)	TCU (23–15)	Florida State (28–15)	Tennessee (32–16)	Dallas Baptist (36–15)т	Creighton (35–11)	Arizona State (37–17)	Fresno State (40–16–1)	27.
28.	Wake Forest	UC Irvine (2–1)	Illinois (6–0)	TCU (6–4)	Baylor (10–4)	UC Santa Barbara (14–3)	Tennessee (20–5)	Tennessee (21–8)	Florida (21–13)	Florida (24–14)	Creighton (22–8)	Auburn (27–17)	Illinois (31–16)	Michigan (37–13)т	Arizona State (36–15)	Indiana State (41–16)	Dallas Baptist (43–20)т	28.
29.	UC Irvine	NC State (3–0)	NC State (7–0)	UC Irvine (7–3)	Miami (FL) (12–3)	Baylor (13–5)	Baylor (16–6)	Michigan (19–7)	Tennessee (23–10)	UC Irvine (21–9)	BYU (26–10)	Missouri (30–15–1)	Auburn (29–18)	BYU (33–14)	Florida State (35–20)	Southern Miss (38–19)	NC State (42–19)т	29.
30.	NC State	Arizona (4–0)	UC Irvine (5–2)	Miami (FL) (9–2)	Oregon (10–4)	Illinois (13–3)	Washington (14–5)	UConn (17–9)	Southern Miss (20–9)	Coastal Carolina (23–13–1)	Michigan (28–11)	Oklahoma State (25–16)	UC Irvine (29–13)	Indiana (33–18)	Cal (30–18)	Indiana (36–21)	Indiana State (43–18)	30.
	Preseason Feb 4	Week 1 Feb 18	Week 2 Feb 25	Week 3 Mar 4	Week 4 Mar 11	Week 5 Mar 18	Week 6 Mar 25	Week 7 Apr 1	Week 8 Apr 8	Week 9 Apr 15	Week 10 Apr 22	Week 11 Apr 29	Week 12 May 6	Week 13 May 13	Week 14 May 20	Week 15 May 27	Final Jun 27	
		Dropped: No. 27 Minnesota	Dropped: No. 26 Southern Miss; No. 27 Wake Forest; No. 30 Arizona	Dropped: No. 21 Oklahoma State; No. 24 Cal State Fullerton; No. 28 Illinois	Dropped: No. 25 Duke	Dropped: No. 24 South Carolina; No. 29 Miami (FL); No. 30 Oregon	Dropped: No. 22 Michigan	Dropped: No. 23 Oklahoma; No. 26 Illinois; No. 30 Washington	Dropped: No. 25 Oklahoma State; No. 27 Florida State; No. 30 UConn	Dropped: No. 25 Michigan; No. 27 Florida Atlantic; No. 30 Southern Miss	Dropped: No. 21 Clemson; No. 25 Texas; No. 27 Missouri; No. 28 Florida; No. 30 Coastal Carolina	Dropped: No. 27 TCU; No. 28 Creighton	Dropped: No. 23 Indiana	Dropped: No. 29 Auburn; No. 30 UC Irvine	Dropped: No. 24 Missouri; No. 27 Michigan	Dropped: No. 22 Illinois; No. 26 BYU; No. 29 Florida State	Dropped: No. 29 Connecticut	

The Preseason poll ranked the top 40 teams in the nation. Teams not listed above are: 31. Georgia Tech; 32. Arizona; 33. Florida Atlantic; 34. Washington; 35. UConn; 36. Missouri State; 37. Indiana; 38. Tennessee Tech; 39 San Diego State; 40. Houston.

== D1Baseball ==
	Preseason Jan 14	Week 1 Feb 18	Week 2 Feb 25	Week 3 Mar 4	Week 4 Mar 11	Week 5 Mar 18	Week 6 Mar 25	Week 7 Apr 1	Week 8 Apr 8	Week 9 Apr 15	Week 10 Apr 22	Week 11 Apr 29	Week 12 May 6	Week 13 May 13	Week 14 May 20	Week 15 May 28	Final June 27	
1.	Vanderbilt	Vanderbilt (2–1)	Vanderbilt (5–1)	Vanderbilt (9–2)	Vanderbilt (13–3)	UCLA (13–4)	UCLA (17–4)	UCLA (20–5)	UCLA (23–6)	UCLA (27–6)	UCLA (30–7)	UCLA (34–7)	UCLA (37–8)	UCLA (41–8)	UCLA (45–8)	UCLA (47–8)	Vanderbilt (59–12)	1.
2.	LSU	LSU (3–0)	LSU (7–0)	UCLA (9–2)	UCLA (11–3)	Mississippi State (18–2)	Mississippi State (22–3)	Stanford (18–3)	Georgia (27–6)	Oregon State (25–8–1)	Oregon State (28–8–1)	Stanford (31–7)	Stanford (34–8)	Vanderbilt (41–10)	Vanderbilt (45–10)	Vanderbilt (49–10)	Michigan (50–22)	2.
3.	Texas Tech	Texas Tech (2–1)	Texas Tech (5–1)	North Carolina (11–1)	Oregon State (12–1–1)	Stanford (12–3)	Stanford (15–3)	NC State (27–2)	NC State (29–4)	Mississippi State (31–6)	Stanford (27–6)	Oregon State (31–10–1)	Vanderbilt (38–9)	Stanford (37–9)	Mississippi State (45–11)	Mississippi State (46–13)	Louisville (51–18)	3.
4.	Louisville	UCLA (3–0)	UCLA (6–1)	Oregon State (10–1)	Stanford (12–3)	Louisville (16–4)	Georgia (21–3)	Georgia (23–5)	Oregon State (23–6–1)	Stanford (24–5)	Georgia (33–8)	Vanderbilt (34–9)	Arkansas (37–12)	Arkansas (39–13)	Stanford (39–10)	Stanford (41–11)	Texas Tech (46–20)	4.
5.	UCLA	Florida (3–0)	North Carolina (7–0)	Florida (9–4)	Florida (13–5)	Georgia (18–2)	NC State (23–1)	Vanderbilt (22–6)	Stanford (20–5)	Georgia (29–8)	Vanderbilt (31–9)	Arkansas (34–11)	Mississippi State (38–10)	Mississippi State (42–10)	Arkansas (40–15)	Arkansas (41–17)	Mississippi State (52–15)	5.
6.	Florida	North Carolina (3–0)	Oregon State (8–0)	Stanford (9–2)	Mississippi State (15–1)	NC State (19–1)	Vanderbilt (19–5)	Oregon State (19–5–1)	Mississippi State (27–6)	Vanderbilt (27–9)	Texas A&M (29–12–1)	Mississippi State (36–9)	Louisville (39–9)	Georgia Tech (35–15)	Georgia Tech (38–16)	Georgia Tech (41–17)	Arkansas (46–20)	6.
7.	North Carolina	Oregon State (3–0)	Florida (5–3)	Mississippi State (10–1)	Louisville (11–4)	Oregon State (14–3–1)	Oregon State (16–4–1)	Arizona State (25–1)	Vanderbilt (24–8)	Texas A&M (27–10–1)	Louisville (31–9)	Louisville (35–9)	Georgia Tech (33–14)	Georgia (39–14)	Georgia (42–14)	Georgia (44–15)	UCLA (52–11)	7.
8.	Oregon State	Louisville (1–2)	Louisville (5–2)	Louisville (8–3)	Georgia (14–2)	Vanderbilt (15–5)	Arkansas (20–4)	Mississippi State (24–5)	East Carolina (24–7)	Louisville (28–8)	Arkansas (30–10)	Georgia Tech (30–14)	Georgia (37–12)	East Carolina (39–12)	East Carolina (42–13)	Texas Tech (39–17)	Florida State (42–23)	8.
9.	Georgia	Georgia (3–0)	Georgia (6–0)	Georgia (9–2)	Ole Miss (12–3)	Texas (15–7)	Arizona State (22–1)	Texas A&M (23–6–1)	LSU (23–10)	NC State (29–8)	Mississippi State (32–9)	Georgia (33–12)	East Carolina (36–11)	Louisville (40–12)	Louisville (43–13)	Oklahoma State (36–18)	Auburn (38–28)	9.
10.	Ole Miss	Ole Miss (1–1)	Ole Miss (4–2)	Ole Miss (8–2)	Florida State (13–1)	LSU (15–5)	Texas A&M (21–5)	Louisville (22–6)	Texas A&M (25–8–1)	UC Santa Barbara (27–5)	UC Santa Barbara (30–5)	East Carolina (33–11)	Texas Tech (33–14)	Texas Tech (34–14)	Texas Tech (36–15)	East Carolina (43–15)	Stanford (45–14)	10.
11.	East Carolina	East Carolina (3–0)	Stanford (6–1)	Florida State (10–0)	Texas Tech (11–3)	Arkansas (17–2)	Louisville (18–6)	East Carolina (21–6)	Ole Miss (23–10)	Georgia Tech (24–12)	Georgia Tech (27–13)	Texas Tech (29–13)	Ole Miss (32–17)	Oregon State (33–15–1)	Oklahoma State (32–17)	Louisville (43–15)	Oklahoma State (40–21)	11.
12.	Stanford	Stanford (3–0)	Mississippi State (6–1)	Texas (10–3)	Texas (12–6)	Auburn (18–2)	Coastal Carolina (18–5–1)	Texas (20–11)	Arkansas (24–8)	Arkansas (26–10)	East Carolina (29–10)	LSU (29–16)	Oregon State (31–14–1)	Baylor (32–13)	Oregon State (35–16–1)	LSU (37–24)	Ole Miss (41–27)	12.
13.	Florida State	Florida State (4–0)	Florida State (7–0)	LSU (8–3)	LSU (11–4)	Texas A&M (17–5)	Texas (17–10)	LSU (19–9)	Arizona State (26–4)	East Carolina (25–10)	LSU (26–15)	Ole Miss (30–15)	North Carolina (34–12)	Oklahoma State (30–17)	Texas A&M (36–19–1)	West Virginia (37–20)	East Carolina (47–18)	13.
14.	Mississippi State	Mississippi State (3–0)	East Carolina (5–2)	Texas Tech (6–3)	Arkansas (12–2)	Florida (15–7)	East Carolina (18–6)	Arkansas (22–6)	Texas (21–13)	LSU (24–13)	NC State (31–10)	Texas A&M (30–15–1)	Baylor (32–13)	UC Santa Barbara (40–7)	UC Santa Barbara (44–7)	Ole Miss (37–25)	LSU (40–26)	14.
15.	Baylor	Baylor (4–0)	Baylor (7–0)	Arkansas (9–1)	North Carolina (12–4)	Arizona State (19–0)	Auburn (20–4)	Auburn (22–6)	Texas Tech (21–9)	Ole Miss (25–12)	Arizona State (30–8)	North Carolina (33–12)	LSU (30–18)	Ole Miss (32–20)	NC State (41–15)	North Carolina (42–17)	North Carolina (46–19)	15.
16.	Arkansas	Arkansas (3–0)	Arkansas (5–1)	Michigan (8–1)	Coastal Carolina (13–3–1)	North Carolina (16–5)	North Carolina (18–7)	North Carolina (22–7)	Clemson (24–8)	Arizona State (27–7)	North Carolina (30–11)	Baylor (30–12)	UC Santa Barbara (36–7)	Texas A&M (34–18–1)	LSU (34–22)	Oregon State (36–18–1)	Duke (35–27)	16.
17.	Michigan	Michigan (3–0)	Michigan (6–0)	Coastal Carolina (10–2)	East Carolina (12–5)	Coastal Carolina (16–4–1)	LSU (17–7)	Texas Tech (18–7)	Georgia Tech (22–10)	North Carolina (27–10)	West Virginia (24–14)	West Virginia (26–15)	Texas A&M (32–17–1)	NC State (39–14)	Miami (FL) (38–17)	Miami (FL) (39–18)	Georgia Tech (43–19)	17.
18.	Oklahoma State	TCU (2–1)	TCU (5–2)	East Carolina (8–4)	Auburn (14–2)	Ole Miss (14–6)	Texas Tech (15–6)	Ole Miss (20–9)	UC Irvine (21–5)	Baylor (24–10)	Texas Tech (25–13)	UC Santa Barbara (32–7)	Oklahoma State (28–16)	Miami (FL) (36–15)	Baylor (33–15)	Texas A&M (37–21–1)	Georgia (46–17)	18.
19.	TCU	Oklahoma State (2–1)	Oklahoma State (5–2)	Auburn (9–2)	Texas A&M (15–3)	Texas Tech (12–5)	TCU (15–7)	Coastal Carolina (20–8–1)	TCU (20–10)	TCU (22–12)	Ole Miss (27–14)	Indiana (30–14)	NC State (37–12)	LSU (31–21)	West Virginia (34–18)	UC Santa Barbara (45–9)	Miami (FL) (41–20)	19.
20.	Wake Forest	Wake Forest (2–1)	Coastal Carolina (7–1)	Texas A&M (11–2)	NC State (15–0)	East Carolina (15–6)	Florida State (17–6)	UC Irvine (18–5)	Louisville (24–8)	West Virginia (22–13)	Tennessee (30–11)	NC State (33–12)	Miami (FL) (34–14)	North Carolina (36–15)	Illinois (36–17)	NC State (42–17)	Texas A&M (39–23–1)	20.
21.	Coastal Carolina	Coastal Carolina (3–0)	Auburn (6–2)	Baylor (9–2)	TCU (9–5)	Florida State (14–4)	UC Irvine (15–4)	Florida (20–10)	North Carolina (23–9)	Missouri (25–12–1)	Baylor (26–12)	Miami (FL) (31–14)	Missouri (33–16–1)	West Virginia (31–18)	Indiana (36–19)	Baylor (34–17)	West Virginia (38–22)	21.
22.	Auburn	Auburn (2–1)	Texas (6–2)	NC State (11–0)	South Carolina (13–3)	TCU (12–6)	Oklahoma (21–4)	UConn (17–9)	Auburn (23–9)	Texas Tech (23–11)	Oklahoma State (25–13)	Arizona State (32–10)	West Virginia (28–17)	Florida State (34–18)	Ole Miss (33–23)	Creighton (38–11)	Creighton (41–13)	22.
23.	Texas	Texas (2–1)	Clemson (6–1)	TCU (6–4)	Tennessee (15–1)	UC Irvine (12–4)	Florida (16–10)	Clemson (22–6)	UC Santa Barbara (23–5)	Miami (FL) (25–12)	Indiana (27–13)	Florida State (28–15)	Florida State (30–16)	Illinois (34–16)	North Carolina (38–17)	Indiana State (41–16)	Indiana State (43–18)	23.
24.	Clemson	Clemson (2–1)	Cal State Fullterton (4–2)	South Carolina (9–2)	Clemson (12–3)	Michigan (13–4)	Ole Miss (17–8)	Oklahoma State (18–8)	Baylor (22–8)	Clemson (25–11)	Miami (FL) (27–14)	Missouri (30–15–1)	Iowa (29–17)	Missouri (34–18–1)	Dallas Baptist (38–16)	Dallas Baptist (41–18)	Dallas Baptist (43–20)	24.
25.	Cal State Fullerton	Cal State Fullerton (2–1)	Illinois (6–0)	Tennessee (12–0)	Arizona State (15–0)	Oklahoma (16–4)	Illinois (17–4)	TCU (17–9)	Coastal Carolina (22–11–1)	Tennessee (26–11)	Auburn (26–14)	UC Irvine (28–10)	Illinois (31–16)	Indiana (33–18)	Creighton (35–11)	Cal (32–18)	Fresno State (40–16–1)	25.
	Preseason Jan 14	Week 1 Feb 18	Week 2 Feb 25	Week 3 Mar 4	Week 4 Mar 11	Week 5 Mar 18	Week 6 Mar 25	Week 7 Apr 1	Week 8 Apr 8	Week 9 Apr 15	Week 10 Apr 22	Week 11 Apr 29	Week 12 May 6	Week 13 May 13	Week 14 May 20	Week 15 May 28	Final June 27	
		None	Dropped: No. 20 Wake Forest	Dropped: No. 19 Oklahoma State; No. 23 Clemson; No. 24 Cal State Fullerton; No. 25 Illinois	Dropped: No. 16 Michigan; No. 21 Baylor	Dropped: No. 22 South Carolina; No. 23 Tennessee; No. 24 Clemson	Dropped: No. 24 Michigan	Dropped: No. 20 Florida State; No. 22 Oklahoma; No. 25 Illinois	Dropped: No. 21 Florida; No. 22 UConn; No. 24 Oklahoma State	Dropped: No. 14 Texas; No. 18 UC Irvine; No. 22 Auburn; No. 25 Coastal Carolina	Dropped: No. 19 TCU; No. 21 Missouri; No. 24 Clemson	Dropped: No. 20 Tennessee; No. 22 Oklahoma State; No. 25 Auburn	Dropped: No. 19 Indiana; No. 22 Arizona State; No. 25 UC Irvine	Dropped: No. 24 Iowa	Dropped: No. 22 Florida State; No. 24 Missouri	Dropped: No. 20 Illinois; No. 21 Indiana	Dropped: No. 16 Oregon State; No. 19 UC Santa Barbara; No. 20 NC State; No. 21 Baylor; No. 25 Cal	
