= Evan McKendry =

American baseball player

Free agent
- Pitcher
- Born: Pembroke Pines, Florida, U.S.
- Bats: Right Throws: Right

Evan Daniel McKendry is an American professional baseball pitcher who is a free agent.

== Career ==
=== Amateur ===
McKendry played college baseball for the Miami Hurricanes. As a junior, he went 7–2 record with a 4.41 ERA and 72 strikeouts.

=== Tampa Bay Rays ===
McKendry was selected in the ninth round by the Tampa Bay Rays in the 2019 Major League Baseball draft. He split his first professional season between the rookie-level Gulf Coast League Yankees and Low-A Hudson Valley Renegades. McKendry did not play in a game in 2020 due to the cancellation of the minor league season because of the COVID-19 pandemic.

McKendry returned to action in 2021 with the High-A Bowling Green Hot Rods; in 21 appearances (10 starts), he compiled a 4–3 record and 3.73 ERA with 60 strikeouts and three saves across 62 2/3 innings pitched. In 2022, he made 23 appearances (19 starts) for the Double-A Montgomery Biscuits and Triple-A Durham Bulls, posting a cumulative 0–5 record and 3.99 ERA with 97 strikeouts across 94 2/3 innings pitched.

McKendry returned to Triple-A Durham to begin the 2023 season, logging an 8–3 record and 4.00 ERA with 95 strikeouts in 96 2/3 innings pitched across 20 appearances (15 starts).

=== Milwaukee Brewers ===
On August 1, 2023, McKendry was traded to the Milwaukee Brewers in exchange for Alex Jackson. He spent the remainder of the year with the Triple-A Nashville Sounds, posting a 4–3 record and 4.93 ERA with 35 strikeouts over eight starts.

McKendry returned to Nashville for the 2024 campaign, compiling a 4–6 record and 5.30 ERA with 69 strikeouts and two saves across 24 appearances (10 starts). He began the 2025 season with Nashville, but struggled to an 0–1 record and 6.43 ERA with four strikeouts over four appearances (one start).

=== Chicago White Sox ===
On May 5, 2025, McKendry was traded to the Chicago White Sox in exchange for cash considerations. He made 20 appearances (13 starts) for the Triple-A Charlotte Knights, accumulating a 5–9 record and 5.15 ERA with 57 strikeouts across 80 1/3 innings pitched. McKendry elected free agency following the season on November 6.

=== Miami Marlins ===
On November 18, 2025, McKendry signed a minor league contract with the Miami Marlins organization. McKendry did not appear in a game in 2026 due to injury and became a free agent on November 2.
