= Samnium =

Historical region of southern Italy; part of the Roman Republic/Empire

Coordinates: 41°10′10″N 14°14′10″E

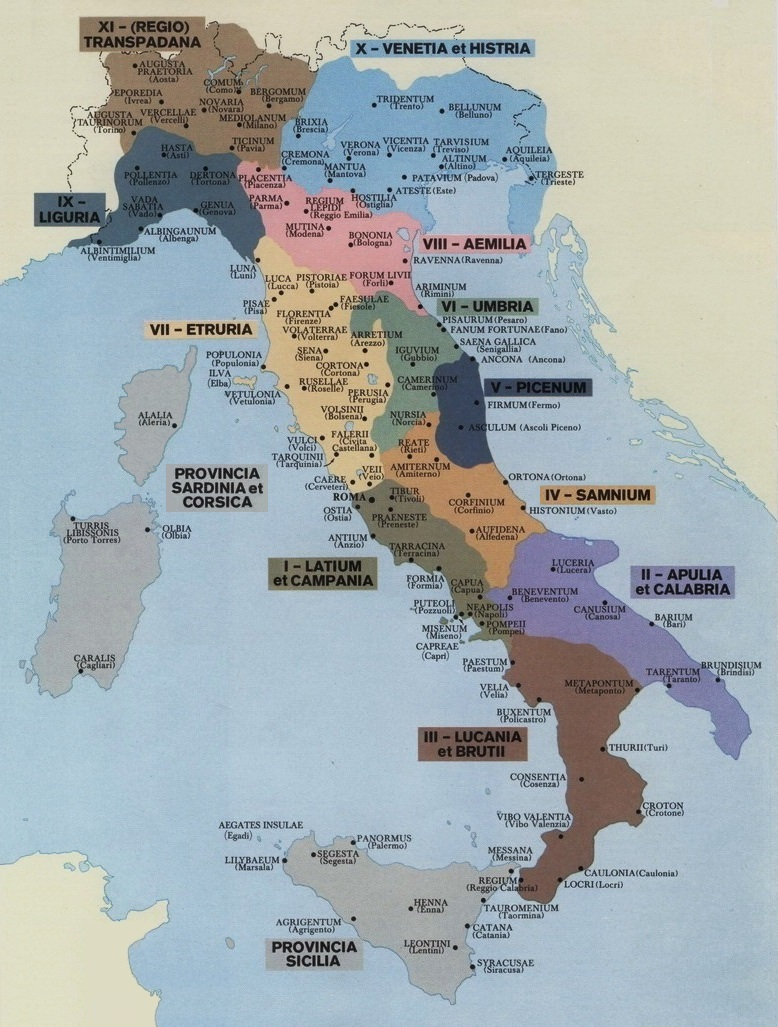
The Roman regio Samnium at the time of Augustus (7 CE) in orange.

Samnium (Italian: Sannio) is a Latin exonym for a region of Southern Italy anciently inhabited by the Samnites. Their own endonyms were Safinim for the country (attested in one inscription and one coin legend) and Safineis for the people. The language of these endonyms and of the population was the Oscan language. However, not all the Samnites spoke Oscan, and not all the Oscan-speakers lived in Samnium.

Ancient geographers were unable to relay a precise definition of Samnium's borders. Moreover, the areas it included vary depending on the time period considered. The main configurations are the borders it had during the floruit of the Oscan speakers, from about 600 BC to about 290 BC, when it was finally absorbed by the Roman Republic.

The original territory of Samnium should not be confused with the later territory of the same name. Rome's first Emperor, Augustus, divided Italy into 11 regions. Although these entities only served administrative purposes, and were identified with the sole numeral, by scholarly convention the Regio IV has been dubbed "Samnium". Ancient Samnium had actually been divided into three of the Augustan regions.

== Etymology ==
Italy in 400 BC. The Samnitic League (dark green) at its peak, including also the Frentani tribe on the Adriatic Sea as a full member and controlling parts of both coasts of the Italian Peninsula.

The Indo-European root Saβeno or Sabh evolved into the word Safen, which later became Safin. The word Safin may have been the first term used to describe the Samnite people and the Samnite Kingdom. Etymologically, this name is generally recognized to be a form of the name of the Sabines, who were Umbrians. From Safinim, Sabinus, Sabellus and Samnis, an Indo-European root can be extracted, *sabh-, which becomes Sab- in Latino-Faliscan and Saf- in Osco-Umbrian: Sabini and *Safineis. Some archaeologists believe Safin refers to all the people of the Italian peninsula, others say just the people of Molise. It could also be an adjective used to describe a group of people. It appears on graves near Abruzzo from the 5th century, as well as Oscan inscriptions and slabs in Penna Sant'Andrea. The last known usage of the word is on a coin from the Social War.

Safin would go through a series of changes culminating in Safinim, the Oscan word for Samnium, meaning "cult place of the Safin people." This became the word for the Samnite people, Safineis. as well as other words in Greek such as Saini, Saineis, Samnītēs, Sabellī, and Saunìtai. These terms likely originated in the 5th century BC and derive from saunion, the Greek word for javelin.

At some point in prehistory, a population speaking a common language extended over both Samnium and Umbria. Salmon conjectures that it was common Italic and puts forward a date of 600 BC, after which the common language began to separate into dialects. This date does not necessarily correspond to any historical or archaeological evidence; developing a synthetic view of the ethnology of proto-historic Italy is an incomplete and ongoing task.

Linguist Julius Pokorny carries the etymology somewhat further back. Conjecturing that the -a- was altered from an -o- during some prehistoric residence in Illyria, he derives the names from an o-grade extension *swo-bho- of an extended e-grade *swe-bho- of the possessive adjective, *s(e)we-, of the reflexive pronoun, *se-, "oneself" (the source of English self). The result is a set of Indo-European tribal names (if not the endonym of the Indo-Europeans): Germanic Suebi and Semnones, Suiones as well as Swedes; Celtic Senones; Slavic Serbs and Sorbs; Italic Sabelli, Sabini, etc., as well as a large number of kinship terms.

== Historical geography ==
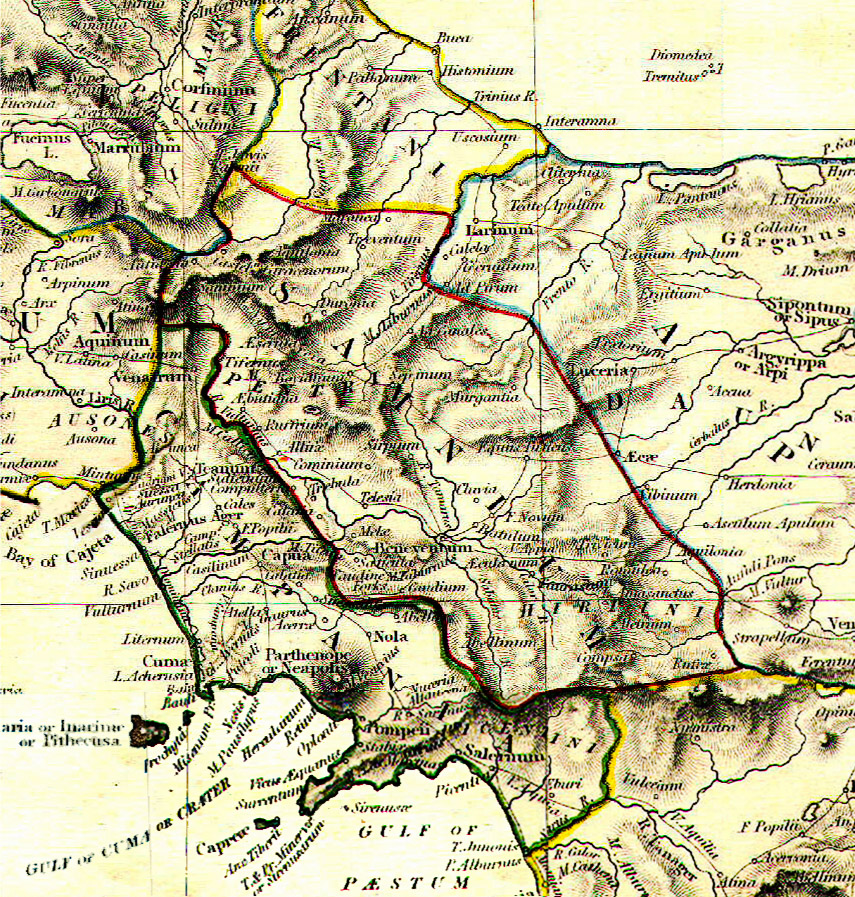
Map of ancient Samnium

Samnium mostly lay on the Apennine area; it was delimited by Latium to the north, by Lucania to the south, by Campania to the west, and by Apulia to the east. The principal cities of the region were Bovaiamom, renamed Bovianum by Latins (today: Bojano or Boiano) and Maleventum (Maloenton in Oscan), which was later renamed Beneventum by the Romans (today: Benevento). For most of their history the Samnites were landlocked, but during a brief period they controlled parts of both coasts of the Italian Peninsula.

The Samnites were composed of at least four tribes: the Pentri (capital: Bovianum), the Caraceni (principal cities: Cluviae, the modern Casoli, and Juvanum, the ruins of which are spread between Torricella Peligna and Montenerodomo), the Caudini (capital: Caudium, today Montesarchio) and the Hirpini (main cities: Beneventum, Abellinum, Aquilonia). They may have later been joined by the Frentani (capital Larinum, the modern Larino).

== History ==
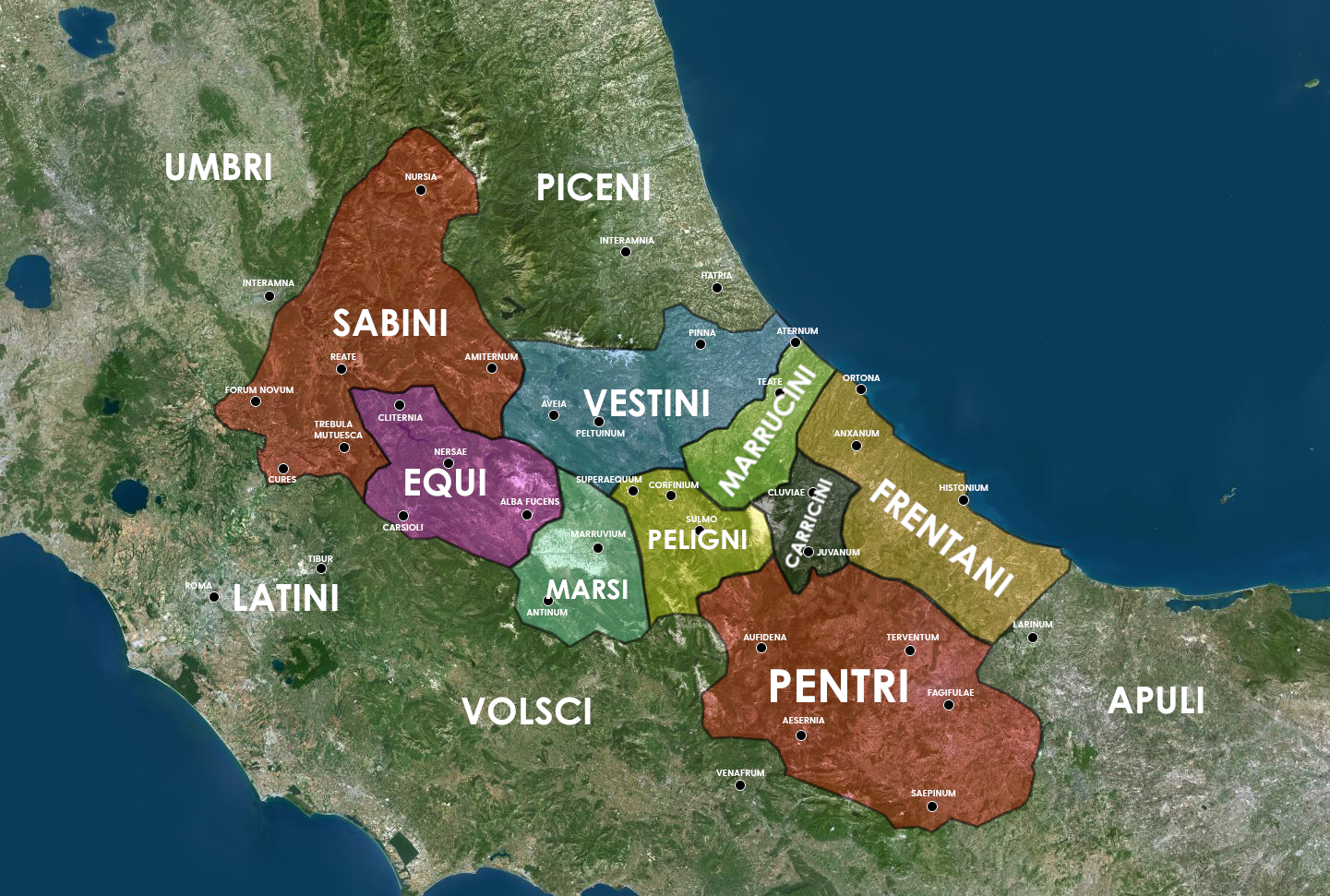
The ancient Italic Peoples of Regio IV Samnium.

The earliest written record of the people is a treaty with the Romans from 354 BC, which set their border at the Liris River. Shortly thereafter the Samnite Wars broke out; they won an important battle against the Roman army in 321 BC, and their imperium reached its peak in 316 BC after further gains from the Romans. By 290 BC, the Romans were able to break the Samnites' power after some hard-fought battles. The Samnites were one of the Italian peoples that allied with King Pyrrhus of Epirus during the Pyrrhic War. After Pyrrhus left for Sicily, the Romans invaded Samnium and were crushed at the Battle of the Cranita hills, but after the defeat of Pyrrhus, the Samnites could not resist on their own and surrendered to Rome. Some of the Samnites joined and aided Hannibal during the Second Punic War, but most stayed loyal. The Samnites and several other Italic people rebelled against Rome and started the Social War (91–87 BC), after Romans refused to grant them Roman Citizenship. The war lasted almost three years, and resulted in a Roman victory. However, Samnites and other Italic tribes were granted Roman citizenship, to avoid another war. The Samnites supported the Populares in the civil war against Lucius Cornelius Sulla, but unfortunately for them, Sulla ended up winning the war and was declared the dictator of Rome. Sulla ordered all those who went against him to be punished. Thousands of people in Rome and all over Italy were brutally hunted down and killed. Samnites, who were one of the most prominent supporters of the Populares, were punished so severely that it was recorded "some of their cities have now dwindled into villages, some indeed being entirely deserted." Samnites did not play any prominent role in history after this, and they eventually became Latinized and assimilated into the Roman World

== Prominent Samnites ==
=== Rulers of the Samnites ===
- Gaius Pontius c. 320s BC
- Gellius Egnatius c. 296 BC

=== Uprising against Sulla ===
- Gaius Papius Mutilus 90–89 with:
- Pontius Telesinus – Samnite commander to Papius

=== Roman citizens ===
- Pontius Pilate – the 5th Prefect of the Roman province of Judaea from AD 26–36.

=== Catholic Popes ===
- Pope Felix IV

== See also ==
- Samnites
- Samnite Wars
- Hirpinia, a sub-region of Samnium
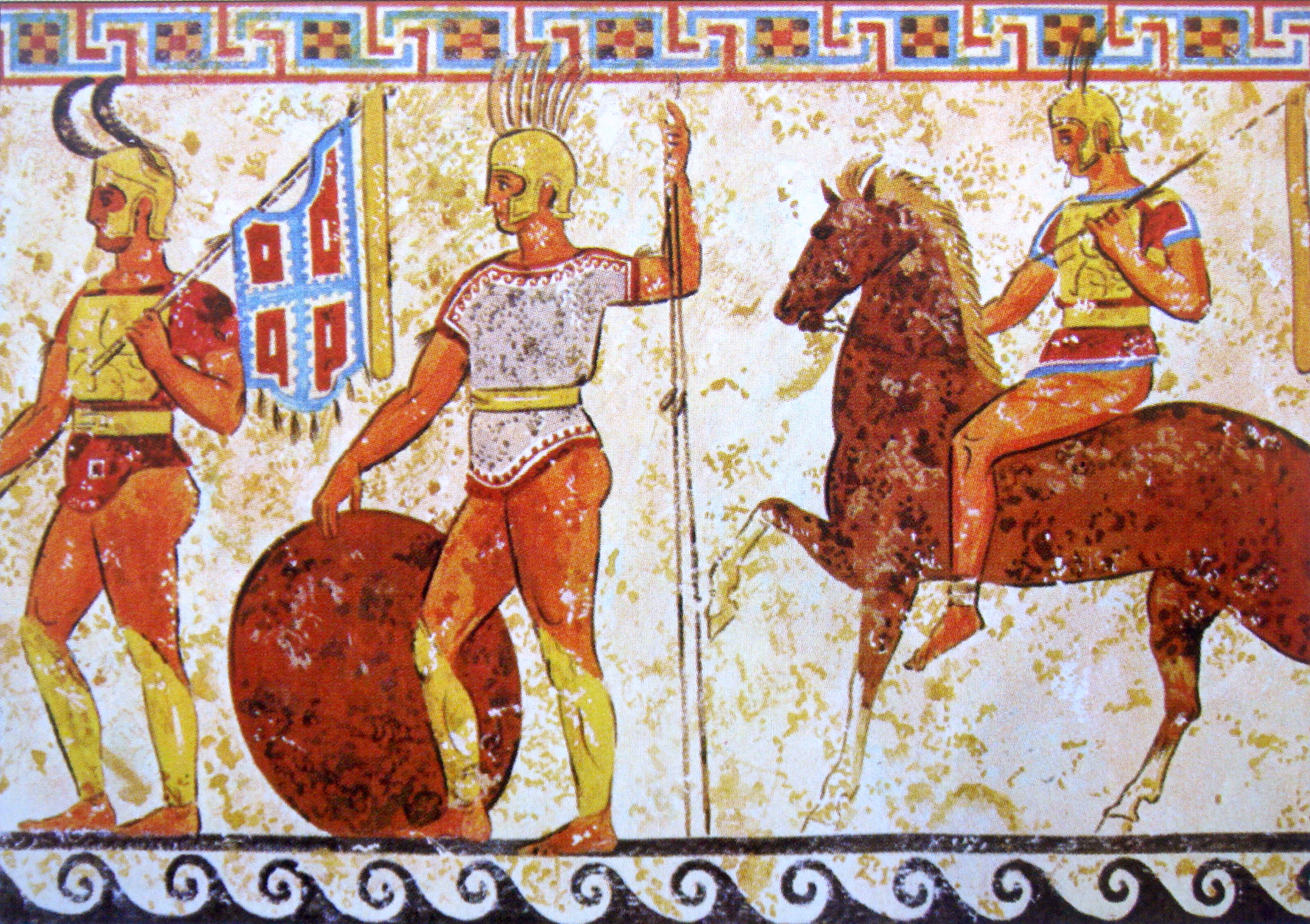
- Samnite soldiers, from a tomb frieze in Nola, Campania, 4th century BC.

== Bibliography ==
- Pokorny, Julius (2005) [1959]. Indogermanisches etymologisches Woerterbuch. Leiden: Leiden University Indo-European Etymological Dictiopnary (IEED) Project. Archived from the original on 2006-09-27.
- Salmon, ET (1967). Samnium and the Samnites. London: Cambridge University Press.
- Grossmann, Lukas, Roms Samnitenkriege: historische und historiographische Untersuchungen zu den Jahren 327–290 v. Chr. (Düsseldorf, Wellem Verlag, 2009) (Reihe Geschichte, 1).
- Ross Cowan, Roman Conquests: Italy (Barnsley, 2009).
