= Lionel Wigram =

Lionel Wigram may refer to:

- Lionel Wigram (film producer), producer and screenplay writer
- Lionel Wigram (British Army officer), Second World War British soldier and tactics instructor
