= Caraceni (tribe) =

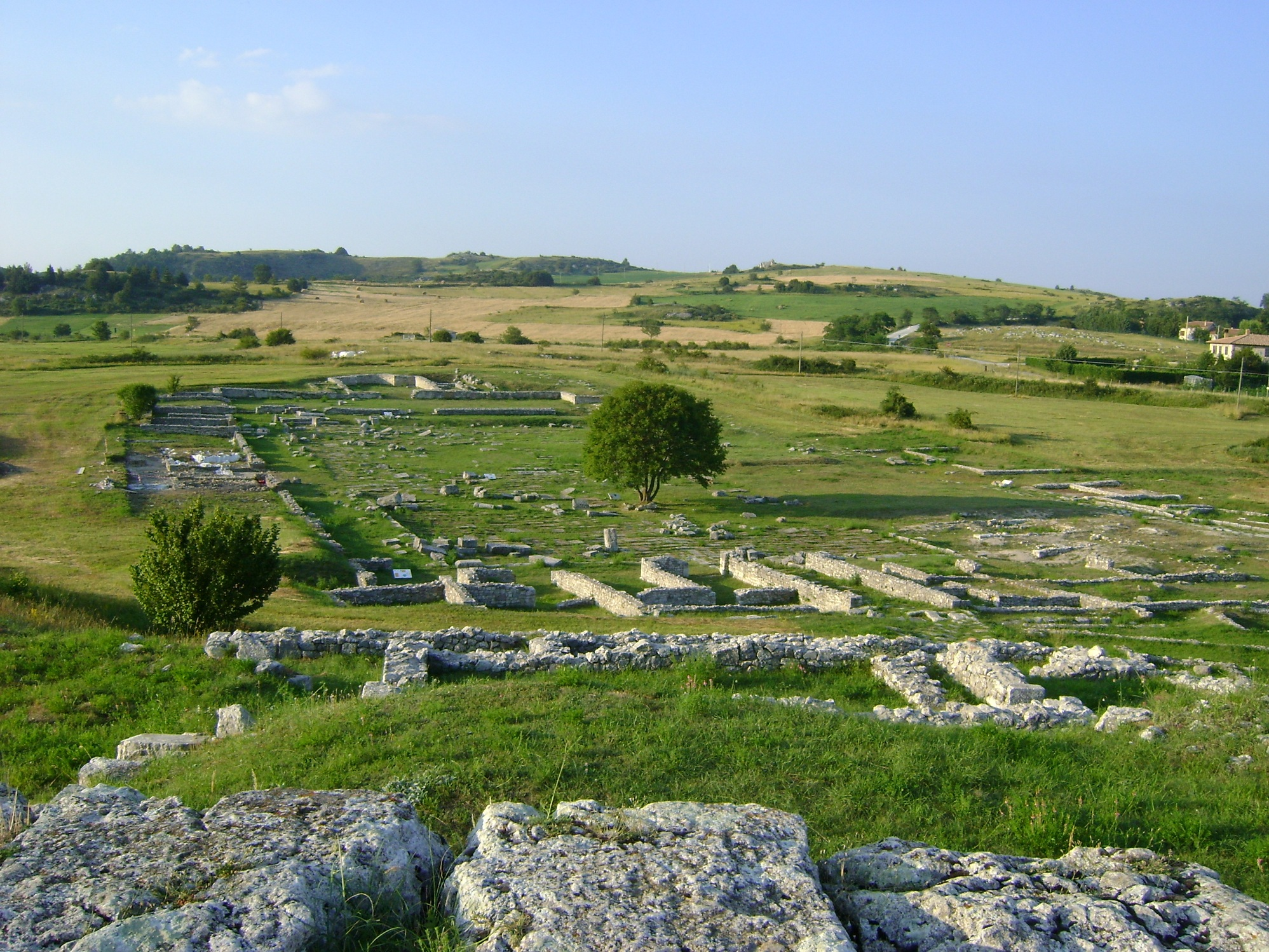
Juvanum

The Caraceni or Caricini or Carricini were a tribe of the Italic Samnites. According to Salmon, their name comes from the Celtic carreg- and car- <Rock>. According to Ptolemy, they inhabited the most northern part of Samnium, bordering on the Peligni and the Frentani; but more especially the upper valley of the Sagrus (modern Sangro). The only city that he assigns to them is Aufidena. Zonaras describes them as possessing a town or stronghold, which was taken by the Roman consuls Q. Gallus and C. Fabius with difficulty. Aufidena has been identified with the modern Castel di Sangro, which seems, from the inscriptions and other remains discovered there, to have been an ancient town.

Their territory was delimited to the north and east from that of the Frentani, to the south from that of the Pentri, and to the west from that of the Peligni. The tribe divided itself in two groups: the "Car[r]icini supernates", which occupied the northern part of their eastern region centered on the city of Juvanum (whose remains are visible in the territory between the communes of Torricella Peligna and Montenerodomo); and the "Car[r]icini infernates" in the southern part, whose main center was Cluviae (whose ruins have been identified with those at Piano Laroma, a frazione of the commune of Casoli). This small community comprised part of the Samnite Confederation, the great antagonist of the Roman Republic, against which it participated in the Samnite Wars and the Social War. The territory of the Caraceni probably came to be occupied by the Romans in the course of the Second Samnite War (c. 310 BC), and the people were gradually assimilated into the Roman state.

Pliny (iii. 12. s. 17), describes a tribe called Carentini which that author seems to place among the Frentani, with the Caraceni, but distinct from them.
