= Torricella Peligna =

Comune in Abruzzo, Italy

- Comune
- Comune di Torricella Peligna
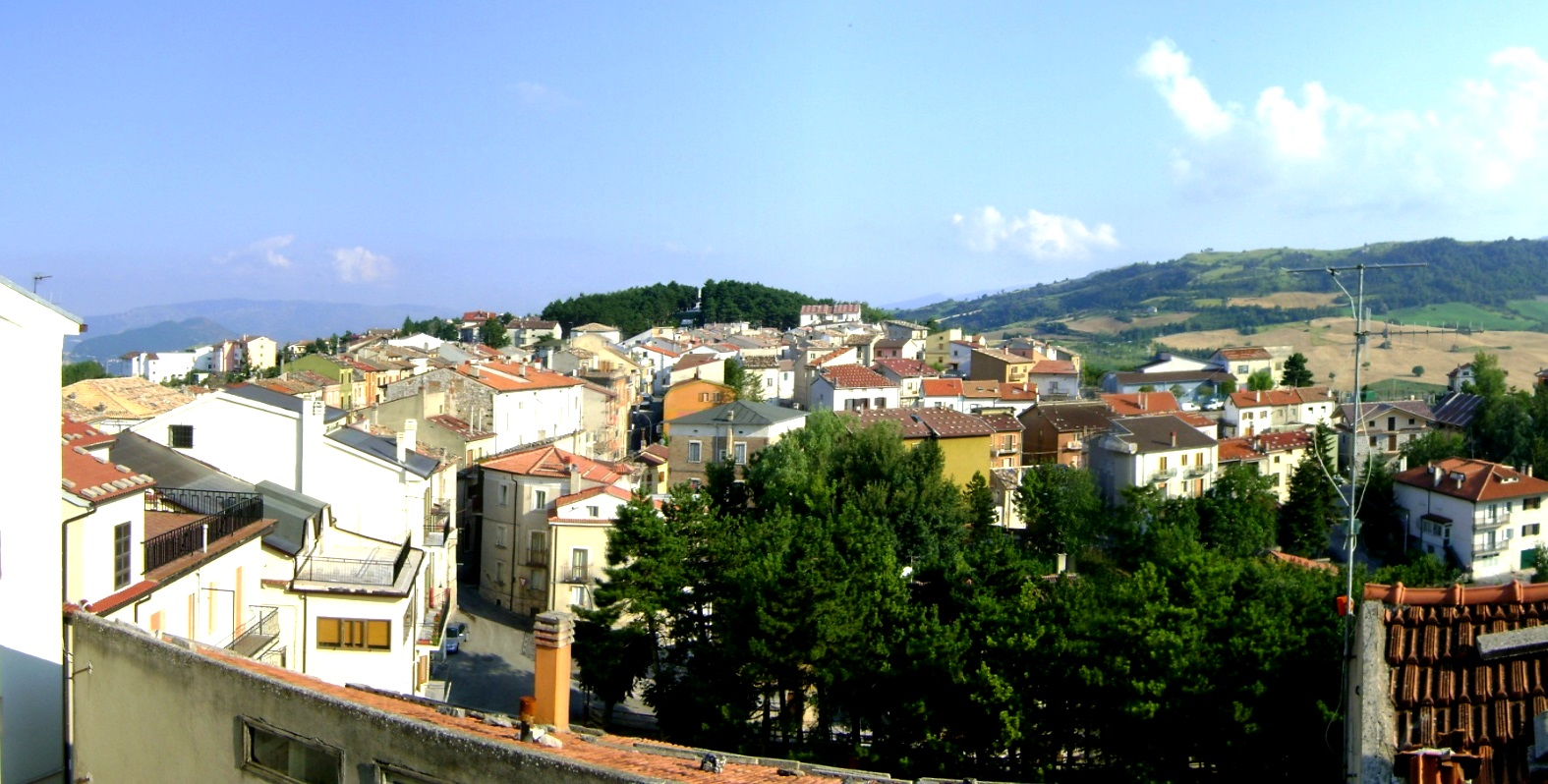

- Coat of arms

- Location within Italy Location within Abruzzo
- Coordinates: 42°1′N 14°16′E
- Country: Italy
- Region: Abruzzo
- Province: Chieti (CH)
- Frazioni: Colle del Ponte, Colle Zingaro, Fallascoso, Purgatoio, Riga Tre Confini, San Giusto

Area
  - Total: 35 km^{2} (14 sq mi)
- Elevation: 910 m (2,990 ft)

Population (31 March 2008)
  - Total: 1,520
  - Density: 43/km^{2} (110/sq mi)
- Demonym: Torricellani
- Time zone: UTC+1 (CET)
  - Summer (DST): UTC+2 (CEST)
- Postal code: 66019
- Dialing code: 0872
- ISTAT code: 069095
- Saint day: 10 July
- Website: Official website

Torricella Peligna is a comune and town in the Province of Chieti in the Abruzzo region of Italy.

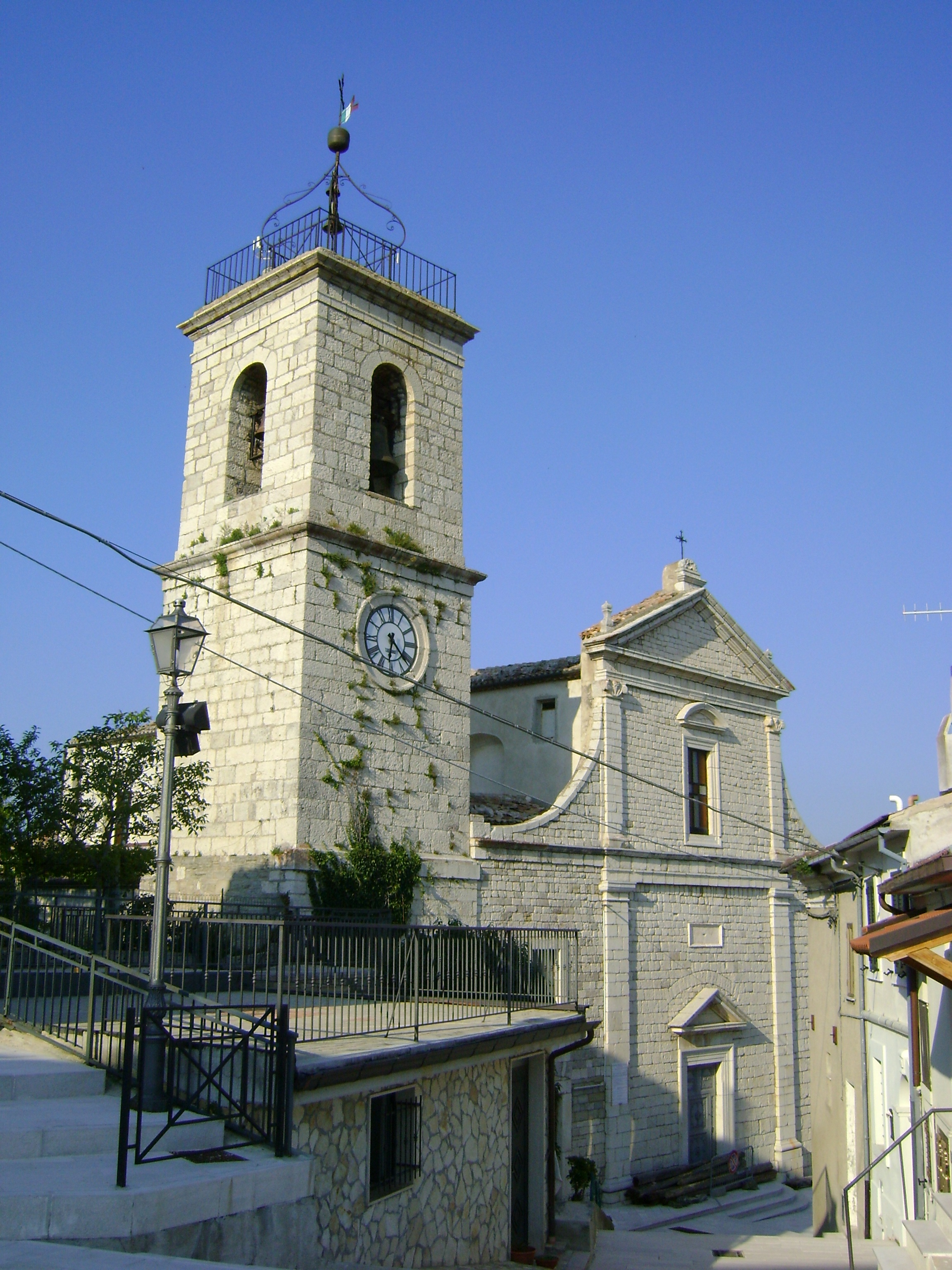
Church of San Giacomo

== History ==
The foundation of Torricella dates back according to local tradition to an exodus from the exiles of Juvanum, during the Byzantine Wars of the sixth century AD, a Roman town near the nearby municipality of Montenerodomo, however the first certain news is given since XII century when it was a fief of Orsini and, later, of Accounts of Manoppello and Marchesi Celaia of Chieti. The country was destroyed during World War II. The current name of the municipality is improper, as are the others of Taranta Peligna and Lama dei Peligni, as these centers rise in the eastern part of the mountain Majella, and sit rovano lapped by the Rivers Sangro and Aventine. In ancient times the centers that existed on site, were inhabited by the Samnite tribes of Carricini, and bordered with the Peligni near Field of Jupiter and the Frentani from Guardiagrele (the ancient Grele) to Lanciano (Anxanum); however, this incorrect toponym was added with the Unity of Italy in 1863.

Torricella made national headlines during World War II. The Germans, in retreat in the Gustav line, made scorched earth of the country, and were fought in '44 by Maiella brigade, in Battle of Sangro. Many were displaced and the medieval castle was destroyed. Torricella was later rebuilt and is in the twenty-first century a tourist destination for mountain excursions.

In 1744 Vincenzo Tobia Nicola Bellini, musician who died in Catania in 1829, grandfather and first master of the famous opera player Vincenzo Bellini, was born there.

=== The origins of Torricella ===
Very full-bodied are the finds of the Italic era dating back to the sixth century BC. near Torricella, in the adjacent districts, various archaeological discoveries have been made, the finds of which are preserved in the Archaeological Museum of Chieti. In Sant'Antonio a tomb with a bronze helmet was found, the decoration on the shell of a deer or goat, preserved in the Archaeological Museum of the nearby Juvanum, a dagger, a collar, a spiral bracelet, four digital rings and an iron fibula. It is claimed that near Monte Moresco, between Torricella and Pennadomo, there are remains of a Samnite fortification, built above an even older settlement, attributed to the second millennium BC, from here comes a stone dagger, preserved in the Pigorini Museum in Rome.

The area was regularly inhabited during the Samnite era, and after the Roman conquest of the tribe of Caraceni (which occupied the area of Juvanum di Montonerodomo, Trebula di Quadri and Cluviae di Casoli); this tribe bordered sangro with Frentani, to the east with the Lucani located near Mount Pallano, up with the Pentri of Bovianum Vetus (Pietrabbondante), finally with the Peligni in eastern Majella. The main city of this tribe was Juvanum, still well preserved, before reaching the center of Montenerodomo, the most practiced economic activity was agriculture along with pastoralism. The tratturo, still partly visible, developed along Colle dell'Irco, and connected to the Celano-Foggia tratturo, where a bronze of Hercules from the fourth century BC was found.

From the discovery at the Le Coste district, it is assumed that the continuity of housing between Torricella and Juvanum had continued even after the period of decadence of the Western Roman Empire. The area was occupied by barbarians during the Greek Gothic War of the sixth century AD, in fact there is the discovery of an Spangehelme ostrogoto or a helmet with bands in gilded copper and iron in the locality of Santa Lucia, well hidden inside a cellar of late Roman origin for the construction material, located in a country farmhouse. This artifact is preserved in the Museum of Early Medieval Byzantine Abruzzo in the ducal castle of Crecchio.

=== The castle ===
The phenomenon of the framing of the seventh-tenth century AD also affected Torricella. The first fortifications are located in the Monte Moresco area, next to the Roman town, which was finally abandoned in the 15th century. A castle is mentioned in some documents of Pope Nicholas II who in 1060 assigned half of it by the Benedictine Monks of the Tremiti Islands. The Middle Ages is also the era of Christian affirmation in Torricella, near Juvanum arose the Abbey of Santa Maria in Palazzo (or Monte Moresco), of which the structure is preserved near the ruins; in the tenth century there is the semi-legendary testimony of the coming of St. Raynald, of the Order of the Basilians together with the monk San Falco, who settled at a hermitage in nearby Palena. In Fallascoso there is still in the twenty-first century the testimony of the hermitage of San Rinaldo. In the year 1173 dates back to the construction of the baronial chapel of Torricella, the mother church of San Giacomo, redone in the 19th century.

From the historical photographs, it can be seen how the castle of Torricella occupied the entire upper area of the country, where the Obelisk of the Civilian Victims of War is located, since it was blown up by the Nazis, after it was occupied as the headquarters of the war operations.

=== From the Middle Ages to the nineteenth century ===
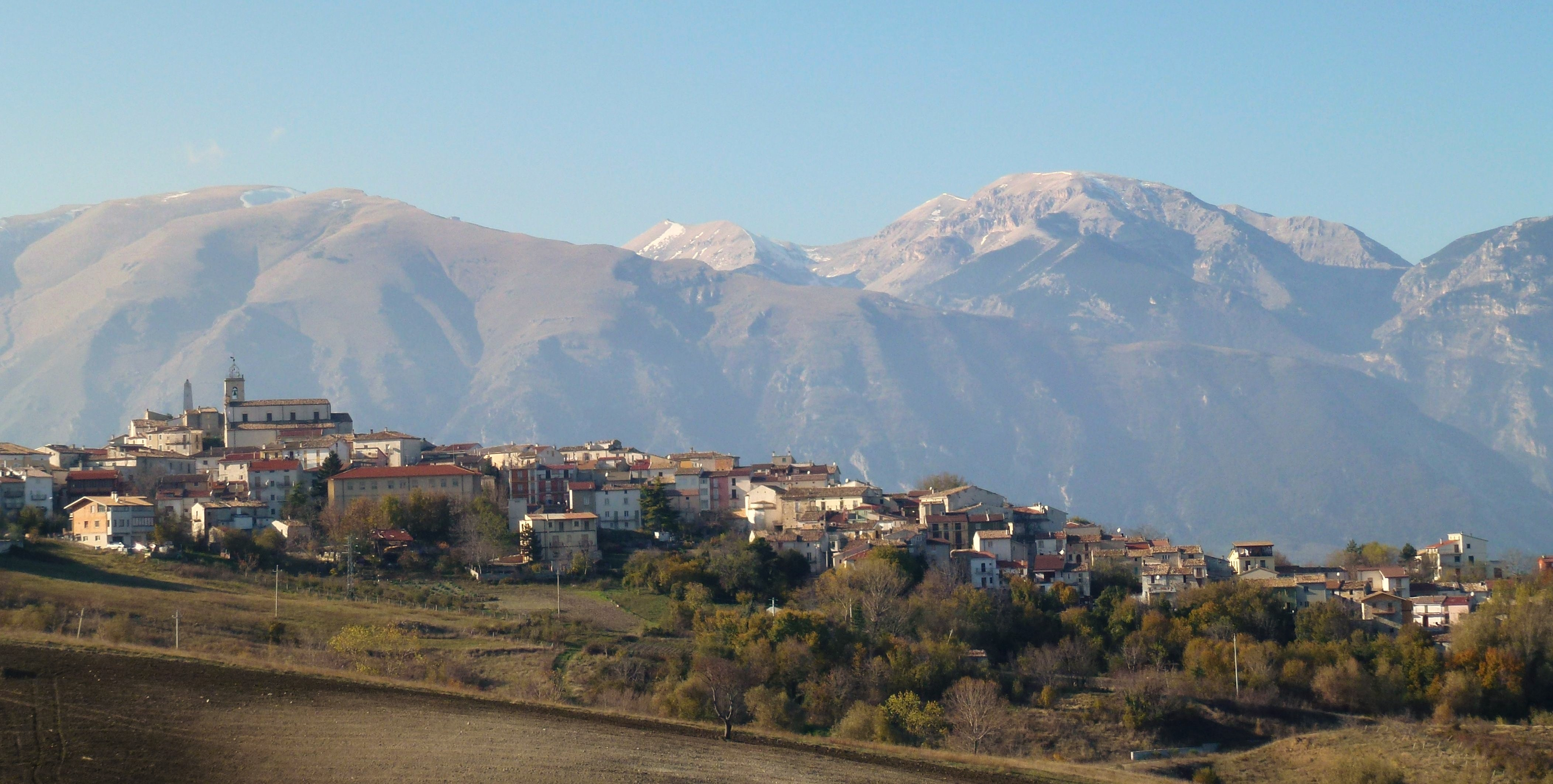
Veduta di Torricella

- 1390: Ladislaus of Durazzo invests Count Orsini of the County of Manoppello, and adds the fief of Monte Moresco or Santa Maria a Palazzo, but it is unknown from the privilege, if Torricella was also included.
- 1400: Ladislao invests Giovanni Battista da Torricella of the fief of Monte Moresco.
- December 15, 1459: Truce between Antonio Caldora and the city of Sulmona for the war of power: Antoninus of Castiglione, heir to Antonio de Sangro baron of Colledimacine, Baron of Torricella and lord of Bagnara, and appointed witness. So it is known that Torricella was part of the lordship of the De Sangro family, which had already fallen in the 16th century, which boasted numerous fiefs in the Peligna Valley.
- 1534: the castle of Fallascoso and Bomba are confiscated from Antonio di Annicchino by Charles V of Austria for his rebellion, and granted to Captain Pirro Colonna.
- 1550: A corpse is mummified in the church of St. James, mummified spontaneously, and discovered in 1989 during the restoration of the church, and a miracle is shouted at, thinking that it may be the body of St. James the Apostle.
- 1551: Caterina de Medici, widow of Pirro Colonna, asked permission for Charles V to sell the goods for the benefit of his daughters, and the fiefs went to Fabrizio Valignano di Chieti.
- 1552: Mention is made of the sanctuary of Our Lady of roses outside the walls, the church is of great importance for towers.
- May 25, 1568: Monsignor Oliva visits Torricella, describes the parish church of San Giacomo as a church outside the walls, a hypothesis that the walls embraced the highest part of the castle hill.
- 1623: Severe famine affecting the center.
- 1706: Severe Majella earthquake damaging Torricella and the centers around it. Torricella is called "university", begins a territorial dispute against Celaia Duke of Canosa.
- 1733: the fiefs of Monte Moresco, Pescorutico (district of Santa Giusta) and Mastronardo, are added to the estates of Alvaro Celaia son
- 1743: Torricella is recorded in the Land Registry. In 1782 the church of San Giacomo was extensively restored, as evidenced by the lintel of the portal
- 1787: The fiefs of Torricella are removed from the assets of the Celaia family and given to the university.
- 1805: Torricella is mentioned in the Geographical Dictionary of the Kingdom of Naples, and reference is made to the trade in "tarantulas", i.e. silk cloths produced especially in nearby Taranta.
- 1841: Strong earthquake damaging houses and the church.
- 1861: plebiscite for annexation to the Kingdom of Italy, Torricella registers 1,108 voters, 942 voters in favor
- 1861: Torricella sees the suffix "Peligna" peligna added to avoid cases of homonymous with other centers of the state. But it is a coarse toponym, as well as for the Abruzzo municipality of Canosa Sannita to distinguish it from the apulian municipality.
- September 26, 1933: Strong Majella earthquake, damaging various centers on the eastern side, including Palena, Lama, Gessopalena, Taranta.

=== Torricella in the Second World War ===
After the armistice of 8 September, due to its strategic position, Torricella was already occupied by the Germans in October 1943 and threatened by Allied bombing. On the one hand, anti-fascist intellectuals, such as Ettore Troilo, had already spontaneously left the country in September because they were considered insecure, on the other, already on 3 September 1943, German planes collided with the allies, but without attacking, as they were headed towards Sulmona to bomb the station. The English prisoners of the Fonte d'Amore internment camp in Sulmona passed through Torricella and found refuge with the inhabitants. On October 19 Torricella was officially occupied by the Germans, who in trucks, requisitioned as many men as possible for the fortification works of the Gustav line, rounding up about 100 people, and installing the garrison of the general command in the baronial castle, at the top of the town, where the Obelisk to the Civil War stands. While Casoli was freed by the British on 4 December, Torricella was evacuated, and the villagers took refuge in the country houses, the same night Ettore Troilo came out of his hiding place to go to the allied command of Casoli to propose the birth of the Maiella Volunteer Corps. The German presence in Torricella was marked by repeated harassment, threats and acts of violence, of which the massacre of Sant'Agata (1 February 1944) is remembered, even if this concerns the villagers of nearby Gessopalena; so they gave more impetus to the Casolani, backed by the British to begin the liberation operations of Torricella.
Another grim episode of Nazi barbarism concerns the "Tre Confini massacre". In January 1944 both Torricella and the nearby village of Fallascoso were in German hands, on January 5 the spouses Tranquillino Di Paolo and Concettina Cianci, hidden among the graves of the cemetery, were discovered and brutally killed; on 11 January Antonio Mancini was machine-gunned in the La Morgia district while he was going to visit his wife who had given birth in a farmhouse where she was hidden, and on the same day Giovanni Del Duca was killed in the district of San Venanzio.

The real massacre concerned the Teti Di Riga family: the head of the family Giustino was discovered by the Germans while hiding in the farm so as not to be taken for the fortification works, and was robbed of his animals. Giustino Di Riga reached the English command of Roccascalegna, to try to request military action, since he knew well the daily route of the Germans along the Torricella-Fallascoso road to carry out the raids. The British accepted, and on the night of 11 January they stationed themselves at the Piccone furnace, and upon the arrival of the Germans, the guerrilla warfare began, with the victory of the British, who returned to Roccascalegna, however not considering the presence of another patrol in Colle of the Irco, who launched rockets for help. The Nazi revenge was ruthless against Torricellan civilians, especially towards women, the elderly and children, since the men had either been taken or had fled to the surrounding villages. The Germans set fire to the farms and the elementary school, triggering panic, so that the Germans could more easily machine-gun them: 15-year-old Antonietta Crivelli, her 6-month-old brother, Carmela D'Ulisse, Giuseppe, Rosina and Rosa Porreca, Nicola Nunziato died Rossi, Costanza Uggè, Maria Antonia di Martino and other young children. Because of the impassable road, specially destroyed by the Germans, it was difficult for the "maiellini" casolani to reach Gesso, and subsequently Torricella at the end of January 1944, because the road had to be rebuilt almost anew, and upon arrival, the partisans found the semi-destroyed town, specially mined by the Germans, especially the baronial castle was blown up.

=== From the post-war period to the twenty-first century ===
Torricella has recovered quickly with the reconstruction, although the historical building fabric has suffered a lot from the destruction, so much so that a small part is preserved in the original appearance. In the following years the economy suffered an impoverishment due to the isolation of the villages, with strong emigration. In the 1970s, with the construction of the Honda Sevel industrial hub of the Val di Sangro things improved, but Torricella, to get out of anonymity, invested in the memory of the courage of citizens during the Second World War, and in addition to the project of memory, he woven relations with America, about the figure of the writer John Fante, whose father was torricellano; one of the main events of the village is the Festival "John Fante - The God of my Father".

=== Churches, shrines and hermitages ===
- Sanctuary of Santa Maria del Roseto in Madonna delle Rose, just outside the village, on a mountain overlooking Gessopalena. It was built in 1550, as commemorated on the lintel above the main entrance and has been restored. The façade is Renaissance and has a hut profile with crowning with a sloping convex. In the center of the roof there is a sail bell tower. The façade is completely plastered and the only stone pieces are the façade under the portal, the corner stones, the sail bell tower and the small windows on the sides of the sail portal. The interior is a single chamber divided in two by two spans of which one of the two sections has the functions of presbytery. The presbytery is elevated by the rest of the church and houses the high altar made entirely of stucco painted in imitation of marble. In a niche there is a statue of the Madonna and Child.
- Hermitage of San Rinaldo. It is located in the Fallascoso district. It was built in front of the cave where Rinaldo da Concorezzo lived in the 9th century. The bell tower is made with a natural rock pinnacle and is made directly from the rock that supports the bell.
- Church of St. Nicholas. It is located in the Fallascoso district. It dates back to the 18th century when it was built on ruins of a medieval palace of which not many traces can be seen apart from a portal with an ogival arch on the main façade. However, the architectural style of the building dates back to the 19th century, when the church was rebuilt or restored after an unknown calamity. the main façade faces the town and the bell tower towards the Maiella. The façade is hut. Above the portal are two monofore. The portal has jambs with classic decorations. The interior has three naves with endonartece All the walls are plastered in the late Baroque style.
- Church of St. James. It is located in the upper part of the historic center, it is the parish church of Torricella. Nothing is known about its construction, other than that it already existed in 1173, and that it underwent heavy restorations in the eighteenth century, and then in the mid-nineteenth century, with the refurbishment of the bell tower. Partially destroyed in the last world war, the church was affected by a drastic restoration. The church is renaissance style. A, eardrum crowns the façade. Three portals give access to the respective aisles. The bell tower is decorated with a frame, the upper register is characterized by a monophore on each side. The naves are separated by pillars to which paraste are leaning. Stuccoes are white and golden.
- New Church of St. Anthony. Located in Via Peligna, in the suburb of Sant'Antonio, it dates back to the seventeenth century, but was destroyed by the Germans, when from the photos it showed a simple style of plastered hut, with Romanesque portal. Only the niche with the statue of the saint remained intact. In the twenty-first century it is a modern church with the architectural style of the 60s, in stone and concrete, with a hut roof.
- Church of San Camillo. It is located in Via Bellini, a cross street of Corso Umberto I. It is a private church of the Piccone family, built in 1855. The style of the façade suggests that the church was built between the seventeenth and eighteenth centuries. The window above the portal is in baroque style as well as the cantoria of the church. The façade has a hut profile and angular red bricks. The crowning is composed of a triangular eardrum. The portal is framed by hoists. The interior has a single nave with a sail vault while the walls are plastered in blue and white tiles.
- Church of Sant'Agata. It is located in the Colle Zingaro district on the road leading to Roccascalegna. It was built immediately after World War II. On the bezel above the portal is depicted the saint.

=== Palaces ===
- Birthplace of Vincenzo Tobia Nicola Bellini, is located at the intersection of Corso Umberto I with via Coste, at the church of San Giacomo. It is the birthplace of the grandfather of the Sicilian composer Vincenzo Bellini is in mixed style, between the late nineteenth-century neoclassical and the rural style in plastered stone blocks.
- Palazzo Persichetti. It is located in Corso Umberto I. It's a noble palace. From the style of the façade overlooking the course it can be seen that the palace was built between the 19th and 20th centuries. The post-war restorations maintained the original style. The outer walls are made of bricks in the ashlar style. Portal frames follow piedritti. The cornice is a jutting pore. At the corners there are paraste. The palace is divided into three floors.
- Fallascoso Baronial Palace. Located in the Fallascoso district, on the hill there is the small town, it is presumed to have been built in the seventeenth-eighteenth century above the castle, for the presence of fortifications at the base. It features traces of garitte at the corners.
