= Fallascoso =

Coordinates: 42°00′22″N 14°14′33″E

- Frazione
- Interactive map of Fallascoso
- Country: Italy
- Region: Abruzzo
- Province: Chieti
- Commune: Torricella Peligna
- Time zone: UTC+1 (CET)
  - Summer (DST): UTC+2 (CEST)

Fallascoso is a frazione in the Province of Chieti in the Abruzzo region of Italy. Its major sites are a "baronial" castle, the church of San Nicola, and the "quaint hamlet" itself.
