= Sherlock Holmes (2009 film) =

2009 film by Guy Ritchie

- British theatrical release poster
- Directed by: Guy Ritchie
- Screenplay by: Michael Robert Johnson; Anthony Peckham; Simon Kinberg
- Story by: Lionel Wigram; Michael Robert Johnson
- Based on: Sherlock Holmes and Dr. Watson by Sir Arthur Conan Doyle
- Produced by: Joel Silver; Lionel Wigram; Susan Downey; Dan Lin
- Starring: Robert Downey Jr.; Jude Law; Rachel McAdams; Mark Strong; Eddie Marsan
- Cinematography: Philippe Rousselot
- Edited by: James Herbert
- Music by: Hans Zimmer
- Production companies: Village Roadshow Pictures; Silver Pictures; Wigram Productions; Lin Pictures; Internationale Filmproduktion Blackbird Dritte
- Distributed by: Warner Bros. Pictures
- Release dates: 25 December 2009 (United States); 26 December 2009 (United Kingdom)
- Running time: 128 minutes
- Countries: United States; United Kingdom; Germany
- Language: English
- Budget: $90 million
- Box office: $524 million

Sherlock Holmes is a 2009 period mystery action film starring Robert Downey Jr. as the character of the same name created by Sir Arthur Conan Doyle. The film was directed by Guy Ritchie and produced by Joel Silver, Lionel Wigram, Susan Downey, and Dan Lin. The screenplay written by Michael Robert Johnson, Anthony Peckham, and Simon Kinberg was developed from a story by Wigram and Johnson. In addition to Downey as Holmes, Jude Law portrays Dr. John Watson. The film, set in 1890, follows eccentric detective Holmes and his companion Watson investigating the crimes of Lord Blackwood, a mysticist who has seemingly risen from the dead. Rachel McAdams stars as Holmes's former adversary Irene Adler and Mark Strong portrays villain Lord Henry Blackwood.

Sherlock Holmes was wide released in theatres by Warner Bros. Pictures on 25—26 December 2009. It received mostly positive reviews from film critics, and grossed $525 million worldwide, becoming the eighth-highest-grossing film of 2009. Downey won the Golden Globe Award for Best Actor in a Musical or Comedy. The film was also nominated for two Academy Awards, Best Original Score and Best Art Direction. A sequel, Sherlock Holmes: A Game of Shadows, was released in 2011.

== Plot ==
In 1890 London, private detective Sherlock Holmes and his partner Dr. John Watson prevent the ritualistic murder of a woman by Lord Henry Blackwood, a noble who has killed five women previously and claims to have supernatural powers. Inspector Lestrade and the police arrest Blackwood. Two months later, Watson, engaged to Mary Morstan, is moving out of 221B Baker Street and ending his partnership with Holmes, exhausted of his eccentricities. Blackwood summons Holmes before he is hanged and warns him that three more deaths will occur and that he cannot stop them. Blackwood is subsequently hanged and pronounced dead by Watson. Holmes is visited by former adversary Irene Adler, who asks him to find a missing man named Luke Reordan. Holmes follows her when she leaves and observes she is working for a man who Holmes deduces is a professor, and that he intimidates Adler.

Blackwood's tomb is found broken into and Reordan's corpse is inside his coffin. Following a series of clues from the body, Holmes and Watson find Reordan's lab and discover experiments attempting to merge science with magic. Later, Holmes is abducted and brought to the Temple of the Four Orders, a secret magical fraternity. The Order head Lord Chief Justice Sir Thomas Rotheram introduces Holmes to U.S. Ambassador Standish and Home Secretary Lord Coward, and they ask Holmes to stop Blackwood, a former member of the society and Rotheram's secret illegitimate son. That night, Rotheram drowns in his bath as Blackwood watches. Coward calls a meeting of the Order and nominates Blackwood to take command of it, and Blackwood reveals himself to them. When he explains his plan to seize control of the British Empire and reconquer the United States, Standish attempts to shoot him but bursts into flames when he fires his gun, and flees out a window to his death.

Holmes studies the rituals of the Order and recognizes that Blackwood's murders have been in accordance with their beliefs, and his final act will be to murder the members of Parliament. With the aid of Lestrade, Holmes surrenders and is taken to Coward, where he sees evidence on his clothes to deduce that Blackwood has conducted a ceremony in the sewers beneath the Palace of Westminster. Holmes escapes and enters the sewers with Watson and Adler, who find Blackwood's men guarding a device developed by Reordan, designed to release cyanide gas into the Parliament chambers and kill all but Blackwood's supporters, to whom he has secretly given an antidote. Blackwood comes before Parliament and announces their impending deaths, then attempts to activate the cyanide device by remote control; Adler is able to deactivate it with a controlled explosion and takes the canisters of cyanide. Coward and Blackwood's supporters are apprehended as Blackwood flees Parliament.

Holmes chases Adler and she leads him to the top of the incomplete Tower Bridge, where Blackwood incapacitates Adler and then fights Holmes. Blackwood falls through the scaffolding and Holmes reveals he has deduced that all of his supposed supernatural feats were achieved through science and theatrical trickery, aided by Reordan's experiments. A crane collapses, causing Blackwood to be ensnared and hanged in chains off the bridge. Holmes revives Adler, who tells him that her employer is Professor Moriarty, and he is not to be underestimated.

As Watson moves out of 221B, a police constable reports to Holmes that a dead officer was found near Blackwood's device. Moriarty used the confrontations with Adler and Blackwood as a diversion while he took a key component, based on the infant science of radio, from the machine. Holmes considers the case reopened.

== Cast ==
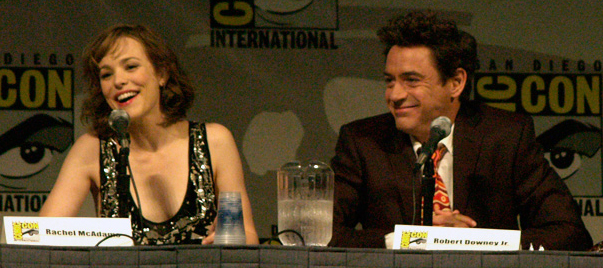
McAdams and Downey at a panel to promote the film at the 2009 San Diego Comic-Con

- Robert Downey Jr. as Sherlock Holmes, a bohemian scientist and eccentric detective-for-hire who becomes a wanted fugitive in his hunt for Lord Blackwood while constantly being followed by the presence of Professor Moriarty. Downey was visiting Joel Silver's offices with his wife, producer Susan Downey, when he learned about the project. Ritchie initially felt Downey was too old for the role because he wanted the film to show a younger Holmes on a learning curve like Batman Begins. Ritchie decided to take a chance on casting him in the role, and Downey told the BBC that "I think me and Guy are well-suited to working together. The more I look into the books, the more fantastic it becomes. Holmes is such a weirdo". Downey also revealed what his wife had to say: "that when you read the description of the guy — quirky and kind of nuts — it could be a description of me". Downey intended to focus more on Holmes' patriotic side and his bohemianism, and felt that his work on Chaplin had prepared him for an English accent. Ritchie feels his accent is "flawless". Both Downey and Ritchie are martial arts enthusiasts, and have been inspired by the Baritsu mentioned in the 1901 story The Adventure of the Empty House. Downey lost weight for the part, because during a chat he had with Chris Martin, Martin recommended that Holmes look "gaunt" and "skinny".
- Jude Law as Dr. John Watson, Holmes' companion and close friend who is also a surgeon and a veteran of the Second Afghan War. Law's Watson is more like the original character, who was more of a colleague, rather than the bumbling fool that actor Nigel Bruce popularised in the 1930s–40s films. Law previously appeared in the Granada Television series The Adventures of Sherlock Holmes, in an episode based on The Adventure of Shoscombe Old Place. Being a Holmes fan, Law recognised there was material unexplored in other adaptations and was intrigued by Downey's casting; Law was cast because he had a positive meeting with Downey and concurred the film would have to explore Holmes and Watson's friendship. Downey believed by emphasizing Watson's qualities as a former soldier, a doctor, a womanizer and a gambler, it would make for a more interesting foil for Holmes. Law made a notebook of phrases from the stories to improvise into his dialogue. Ritchie originally envisioned Russell Crowe in the role.
- Mark Strong as Lord Henry Blackwood, an aristocratic serial killer dabbling in the occult to compel others to do his bidding. Having returned after his execution, Blackwood concocts a plan to gain control of Britain. He is given many seemingly supernatural elements to his character, and his presence is usually accompanied by a menacing crow. Strong worked with director Ritchie for the third time and said he appreciates the director's lack of ego and how easy he is to work with.
- Rachel McAdams as Irene Adler, an American femme fatale from New Jersey who outwitted Holmes twice, as chronicled in Doyle's story A Scandal in Bohemia. The film considerably departs from Doyle's original, where Holmes never met Adler again after the one occasion where she outwitted (and greatly impressed) him. In the film, Adler, a skilled professional thief, as well as a divorcée, needs Holmes' help to find a missing man named Luke Reordan. Downey convinced Ritchie to cast McAdams, arguing she would not look too young to be his love interest. McAdams welcomed the opportunity to play a character who is "her own boss and a real free spirit". Adler and Holmes are depicted as having a deep and mutual infatuation, even while she is employed by Professor Moriarty.
- Kelly Reilly as Mary Morstan, a governess whom Watson wishes to marry, causing a conflict with Holmes.
- Eddie Marsan as Inspector Lestrade, an investigator from Scotland Yard who hires Holmes to look into the murders. Unlike in many previous adaptations, Lestrade is not portrayed as a bumbling inspector but is shown to be a rather competent officer (though he is relatively fed up with Holmes).
- Hans Matheson as Lord Coward, the Home Secretary who is Blackwood's right-hand man and assisted Blackwood in all his murders and was one of the few of his allies aware of Blackwood's usage of technology to feign magical powers.
- Geraldine James as Mrs. Hudson, Sherlock Holmes' landlady. This is James' second Holmes film. She also portrayed Dr. Mortimer's wife in the 2002 adaptation of The Hound of the Baskervilles.
- James Fox as Sir Thomas Rotheram, the biological father of Lord Blackwood and Head of the Four Orders.
- William Hope as American Ambassador John Standish.
- Robert Maillet as Dredger, a 7-foot (2.14 meter), French-speaking henchman working for Blackwood.
- William Houston as Constable Clark

Andrew Jack provided the voice of Professor Moriarty, although director Guy Ritchie initially declined to identify him. Jared Harris, who played Moriarty in the sequel Sherlock Holmes: A Game of Shadows, re-dubbed Jack's lines for later home media releases and television broadcasts of the film.

== Production ==
=== Development ===
A lot of the action that Conan Doyle refers to was actually made manifest in our film. Very often, Sherlock Holmes will say things like, "If I hadn't been such an expert short [single] stick person, I would have died in that" or he would refer to a fight off-screen. We're putting those fights on screen.

— Producer/co-writer Lionel Wigram

Producer Lionel Wigram remarked that for around ten years, he had been thinking of new ways to depict Sherlock Holmes. "I realized the images I was seeing in my head [when reading the stories] were different to the images I'd seen in previous films." He imagined "a much more modern, more bohemian character, who dresses more like an artist or a poet", namely Henri de Toulouse-Lautrec. After leaving his position as executive for Warner Bros. Pictures in 2006, Wigram sought a larger scope to the story so it could attract a large audience, and amalgamated various Holmes stories to flesh it out further. Some sequences in the movie were more than suggested by uncredited incidents found in a 1979 novel Enter the Lion: A Posthumous Memoir of Mycroft Holmes. Lord Blackwood's character was developed as a nod to Victorian interests in spiritualism and the later influence of Aleister Crowley. The producer felt he was "almost clever" pitting Holmes, who has an almost supernatural ability to solve crimes, against a supposedly supernatural villain. The plot point, moreover, nods to the Holmesian tale of The Hound of the Baskervilles, where a string of seemingly supernatural events is finally explained through intuitive reasoning and scientific savvy. Wigram wrote and John Watkiss drew a 25-page comic book about Holmes in place of a spec script. Professor Moriarty was included in the script to set up the sequels.

In March 2007, Warner Bros. chose to produce, seeing similarities in the concept with Batman Begins. Arthur Conan Doyle's estate had some involvement in sorting out legal issues, although the stories are in the public domain in the United States. Neil Marshall was set to direct, but Guy Ritchie signed on to direct in June 2008. When a child at boarding school, Ritchie and other pupils listened to the Holmes stories through dormitory loudspeakers. "Holmes used to talk me to sleep every night when I was seven years old," he said. Therefore, his image of Holmes differed from the films. He wanted to make his film more "authentic" to Doyle, explaining, "There's quite a lot of intense action sequences in the stories, [and] sometimes that hasn't been reflected in the movies." Holmes' "brilliance will percolate into the action", and the film will show that his "intellect was as much of a curse as it was a blessing". Ritchie sought to make Sherlock Holmes a "very contemporary film as far as the tone and texture", because it has been "a relatively long time since there's been a film version that people embraced".

=== Filming ===
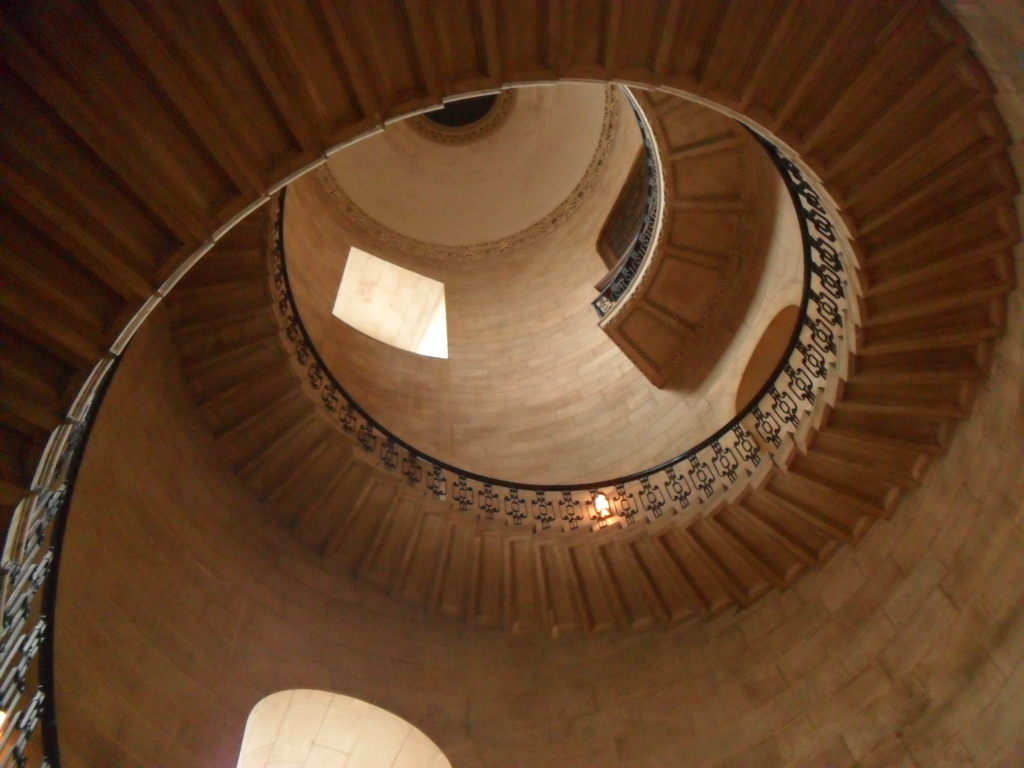
The Dean's Staircase at St. Paul's Cathedral was used for the opening sequence of the film.

Filming began in October 2008. The crew shot at Freemasons' Hall and St Paul's Cathedral.

Filming was conducted in Manchester's Northern Quarter. Manchester Town Hall was extensively used for numerous scenes with some minor CGI modifications. The interior courtyard was used for a fight scene, the Great Hall doubled as the House of Lords, and numerous areas such as the landing were used as a backdrop.

They shot the opening scene for three days at St Bartholomew-the-Great church in London, and shot on the river Thames at Wapping for a scene involving a steamboat on 7 November. Filming continued at Stanley Dock and Clarence Dock in Liverpool and The Historic Dockyard, Chatham. Street scenes were filmed in cobbled alleyways in Chatham and Manchester. Brompton Cemetery in London was used for a key scene, and the palatial 19th-century interior of the Reform Club stood in for the Café Royal. Scenes from the interior of 221B Baker Street were shot on a sound stage at Leavesden Studios.

In late November 2008, actor Robert Maillet, who played Dredger, was filming a fight scene at Chatham Dockyard in Kent, and accidentally punched Robert Downey Jr. in the face, causing Downey to be bloodied and knocked down, but not knocked unconscious as originally reported.

When filming at St John's Street in December, the schedule had to be shortened from 13 to nine days because locals complained about how they would always have to park cars elsewhere during the shoot. In January 2009, filming moved to Brooklyn.

Ritchie wanted his Holmes' costume to play against the popular image of the character, joking "there is only one person in history who ever wore a deerstalker". Downey selected the character's hat, a beat-up fedora. The director kept to the tradition of making Holmes and Watson's apartment quite messy and had it decorated with artifacts and scientific objects from the continents they would have visited.

=== Music ===
The soundtrack for the film was composed by Hans Zimmer. It was released on 12 January 2010. Zimmer purchased an out-of-tune piano for 200 dollars and used it throughout the scoring process because of its "quirkiness".

== Distribution ==
The film had its world premiere on 14 December 2009, in London, and was subsequently released worldwide on 25 December 2009 (26 December, Boxing Day in the UK and Ireland), after being pushed from a November release date. An advance charity screening was held in select locations in Belgium on 10 December 2009.

=== Home media ===
Sherlock Holmes was released on DVD and Blu-ray/DVD/digital on 30 March 2010 in the United States. The film has since grossed $44,908,336 in DVD sales.

== Reception ==
=== Box office ===
The film opened to an estimated $62.4 million in its first weekend in America alone, placing in second at the US box office to Avatar, which grossed $75.6 million. The film earned a strong per-theater average of $18,031 from its 3,626 theaters. Its one-day Christmas sales broke records. Sherlock Holmes grossed $209 million in North America and $524 million worldwide, making it Guy Ritchie's biggest box-office success at the time; it has since been surpassed by Sherlock Holmes: A Game of Shadows and Aladdin. It was also the 8th highest grossing film of 2009 worldwide, and domestically. On the domestic charts, it is the seventh highest-grossing film to never hit No. 1 in the weekend box office, behind Oppenheimer, Sing, My Big Fat Greek Wedding, Alvin and the Chipmunks: The Squeakquel, that film's 2007 predecessor, and A Star Is Born.

=== Critical response ===
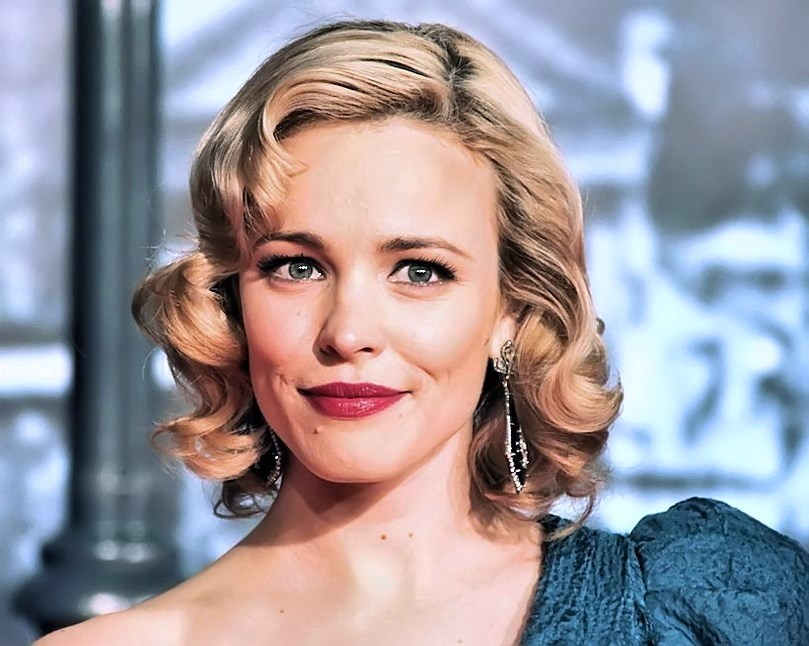
Film critic William Thomas felt that Rachel McAdams was underused.

On Rotten Tomatoes, the film holds an approval rating of 70% based on 248 reviews, with a rating average of 6.25/10. The site's critical consensus reads, "Guy Ritchie's directorial style might not be quite the best fit for an update on the legendary detective, but Sherlock Holmes benefits from the elementary appeal of a strong performance by Robert Downey, Jr." On Metacritic, which assigns a weighted average to reviews, the film has a score of 57 out of 100, based on 34 critics, indicating "mixed or average reviews". Audiences polled by CinemaScore gave the film an average grade of "B" on an A+ to F scale.

Roger Ebert of the Chicago Sun-Times gave the film three out of four stars and highlighted the film's strong characters, visuals and action-packed plot; the characters were also praised by Jake Tomlinson of Shave Magazine, who believed that Downey and Law were "perfect together" and that Strong was "a convincing and creepy villain".

A. O. Scott of the New York Times noted that the director's approach to films was "to make cool movies about cool guys with cool stuff" and that Sherlock Holmes was essentially "a series of poses and stunts" which was "intermittently diverting" at best.

David Stratton of The Australian disliked the film's interpretation of the original Holmes stories and concluded, "The makers of this film are mainly interested in action; that, they believe, is all that gets young audiences into cinemas today. They may be right, but they have ridden roughshod over one of literature's greatest creations in the process." Despite this, he praised the production design and score.

Todd McCarthy of Variety criticized elements of the script such as the representation of Irene Adler, stating that her character was "not very well integrated into the rest of the story, a shortcoming the normally resourceful McAdams is unable to do much about". Like McCarthy, Scott is critical of Adler's character, stating, "Ms. McAdams is a perfectly charming actress and performs gamely as the third wheel of this action-bromance tricycle. But Irene feels in this movie more like a somewhat cynical commercial contrivance. She offers a little something for the ladies and also something for the lads, who, much as they may dig fights and explosions and guns and chases, also like girls."

Entertainment Weekly's Owen Gleiberman found the film "both fun and numb, enjoyable and exhausting", finding Strong's character one-dimensional, and McAdams "enticing in such a sweet Victorian way that it seems perverse for the movie to muffle the romantic spark between her and our hero." He felt that the film could have been better "if it had been an origin story, with Holmes discovering his lightning powers of intuition".

Empire film critic William Thomas gave the film three out of five stars, praising Downey and Law's chemistry, but felt McAdams was underused, that "occasional bits featuring a farty comedy dog" were not funny and that "the narrative is simply too simplistic", but overall called it, "fun, action-packed".

Catherine Shoard of The Guardian gave the film 2 out of five stars, writing that the film "baffles in all the wrong ways" and is a "hollow attempt at modernisation, and quickly grows dull".

Jamie S. Rich, on DVD Talk, gave the film one and a half stars out of five stars. He was unimpressed with the casting, particularly McAdams, and disliked Ritchie's direction and called the film "proof that you can throw as much money as you want toward making a blockbuster, but you still can't create true talent where there is only a soulless approximation of the same."

=== Accolades ===
Award	Category	Recipient	Result
Academy Awards	Best Art Direction	Sarah Greenwood and Katie Spencer	Nominated
Academy Awards	Best Original Score	Hans Zimmer	Nominated
Golden Globe Awards	Best Actor – Musical or Comedy	Robert Downey Jr.	Won
Broadcast Film Critics Association	Best Score	Hans Zimmer	Nominated
Empire Awards	Best Thriller		Won
Empire Awards	Best Actor	Robert Downey Jr.	Nominated
Visual Effects Society	Outstanding Supporting Visual Effects in a Feature Motion Picture	Jonathan Fawkner, Chas Jarrett, David Vickery, Dan Barrow	Won
Visual Effects Society	Outstanding Compositing in a Feature Motion Picture	Kate Windibank, Jan Adamczyk, Sam Osborne, Alex Cumming	Nominated
Saturn Awards	Best Action or Adventure Film		Nominated
Saturn Awards	Best Director	Guy Ritchie	Nominated
Saturn Awards	Best Actor	Robert Downey Jr.	Nominated
Saturn Awards	Best Supporting Actor	Jude Law	Nominated
Saturn Awards	Best Supporting Actress	Rachel McAdams	Nominated
Saturn Awards	Best Music	Hans Zimmer	Nominated
Saturn Awards	Best Costume	Jenny Beavan	Nominated
Saturn Awards	Best Production Design	Sarah Greenwood	Nominated

== Sequels ==
The sequel, Sherlock Holmes: A Game of Shadows, with Downey and Law returning, was released on 16 December 2011. A third film is currently in development hell, with Downey and Law again reprising their roles, Dexter Fletcher replacing Ritchie as director, and Chris Brancato writing the script. Two television series set in the universe of the films are in development for HBO Max.
