= Crecchio =

- Comune
- Comune di Crecchio
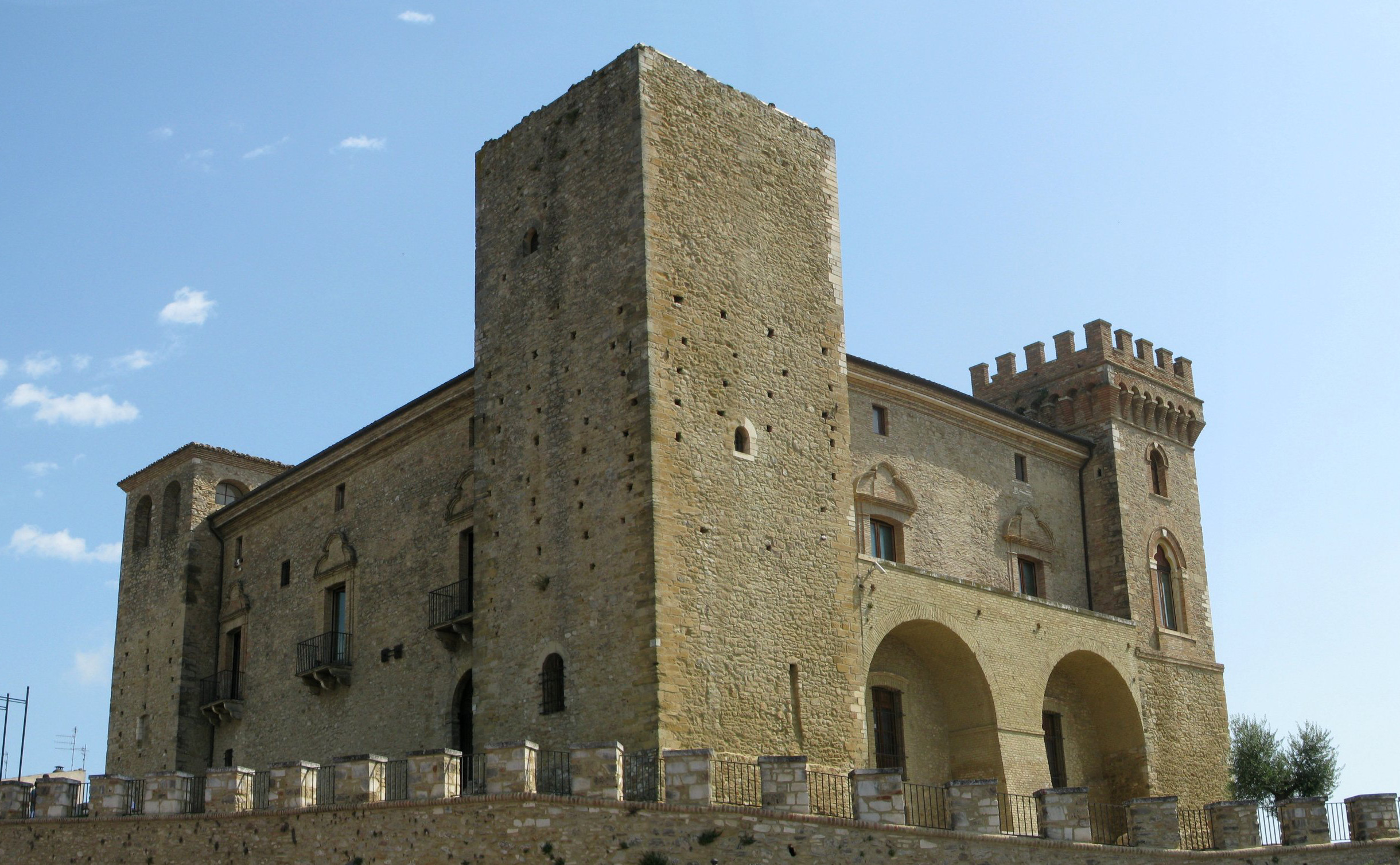
- The castle

- Location within Italy Location within Abruzzo
- Coordinates: 42°18′N 14°20′E
- Country: Italy
- Region: Abruzzo
- Province: Chieti (CH)
- Frazioni: Cardetola, Casino Vezzani, Consalvi, Contrada Marcone, Mucchiarelli, San Polo, San Polo Stazione, Vassarella, via Piana, Villa Baccile, Villa Consalvi, Villa Formicone, Villa Mascitti, Villa Selciaroli, Villa Tucci, Villavalentini

Government
  - Mayor: Nicolino Di Paolo

Area
  - Total: 19.23 km^{2} (7.42 sq mi)
- Elevation: 208 m (682 ft)

Population (31 December 2017)
  - Total: 2,842
  - Density: 147.8/km^{2} (382.8/sq mi)
- Demonym: Crecchiesi
- Time zone: UTC+1 (CET)
  - Summer (DST): UTC+2 (CEST)
- Postal code: 66014
- Dialing code: 0871
- Saint day: 28 August
- Website: Official website

Crecchio is a comune and village in the province of Chieti, part of the Abruzzo region in central Italy. The village preserves its medieval aspect and is dominated by its castle. It is one of I Borghi più belli d'Italia ("The most beautiful villages of Italy"). Its main activities are agriculture and tourism, yet small family-run businesses exist.

== Geography ==
Crecchio is located between the Adriatic coast and the pedemountain areas of the Maiella Mountain Massif. The Arielli and Rifago streams flow in the north west of the territory. These have cut deep valleys and have given rise to a hill with steep flanks, the top of which is occupied by Crecchio itself. In the south eastern areas, the landscape slopes towards the Moro stream.

Even though the area as a whole is dominated by hills and valleys, there are several flat areas within the boundaries of the commune. These include the areas Pietra Lata, Casone e Macchie near the provincial road "Marrucina" (ex SS 538), at Fonte Roberto and Ciaò (between Villa Mascitti and Casino Vezzani), in the areas surrounding Villa Tucci (Padule, Pozzo e Capo Lemare) and at S. Maria Cardetola. The elevation slowly decreases from southwest to northeast. The minimum elevation of 86 metres (282 ft) above sea level is at Piano di Morrecine in the valley of the Arielli stream (northern areas) while the maximum elevation is 276 metres (906 ft) at the old railway station near the border with the commune of Arielli.

== History ==
Historical sources date Crecchio back to at least the 11th century, and archaeological evidence suggests it was inhabited at least as far back as the Roman era.

== Main sights ==
The major building is the 12th-century castle which was converted to residential use in 1789. The castle became the family seat of the de Riseis family. The family were host to Prince Umberto in 1926 for one night of their honeymoon.

The castle was the site of an event during World War II when, on 10 September 1943, after the armistice, King Victor Emmanuel III of Italy, in flight from Rome, spent a night in the castle before leaving Italy from the port of Ortona.

An Etruscan and Byzantine museum is located inside the castle.

== Economy ==
The economy is mainly based on agriculture where vineyards and olive trees dominate the hills and valleys. The main vines grown are Montepulciano d'Abruzzo and Trebbiano. The first produces a dense red wine while Trebbiano grapes produce a rich white table wine.

The few business activities are mainly focused on the textile and mechanical industry.

== See also ==
- Abruzzo (wine)

== Twin towns ==
- Lariano, Italy
