= Sherlock Holmes: A Game of Shadows =

2011 film by Guy Ritchie

- Theatrical release poster
- Directed by: Guy Ritchie
- Written by: Kieran Mulroney; Michele Mulroney
- Based on: Sherlock Holmes and Dr. Watson by Sir Arthur Conan Doyle
- Produced by: Dan Lin; Joel Silver; Lionel Wigram; Susan Downey
- Starring: Robert Downey Jr.; Jude Law; Noomi Rapace; Jared Harris; Eddie Marsan; Rachel McAdams
- Cinematography: Philippe Rousselot
- Edited by: James Herbert
- Music by: Hans Zimmer
- Production companies: Village Roadshow Pictures; Silver Pictures; Wigram Productions
- Distributed by: Warner Bros. Pictures
- Release date: 16 December 2011
- Running time: 129 minutes
- Countries: United States; United Kingdom
- Language: English
- Budget: $125 million
- Box office: $543.8 million

Sherlock Holmes: A Game of Shadows is a 2011 period mystery action film and the sequel to the 2009 film Sherlock Holmes. The film is directed by Guy Ritchie and produced by Dan Lin, Joel Silver, Lionel Wigram, and Susan Downey.

The film's screenplay was written by Kieran Mulroney and Michele Mulroney. Robert Downey Jr. and Jude Law reprise their roles as Sherlock Holmes and Dr. John Watson, respectively, alongside Noomi Rapace as Madame Simza "Sim" Heron, Jared Harris as Professor Moriarty, Stephen Fry as Mycroft Holmes, Kelly Reilly as Mary Morstan, Eddie Marsan as Inspector Lestrade, William Houston as Constable Clark, and Rachel McAdams as Irene Adler. Although the film follows an original premise, it incorporates more closely elements of Conan Doyle's short stories, including "The Final Problem" and "The Adventure of the Empty House". In the film, Holmes and Watson travel across Europe with a Romani fortune-teller to foil an intricate plot by the cunning Professor Moriarty to instigate a major European conflict.

Though the film received predominantly mixed reviews from critics, with praise for the action sequences and the performances of Downey, Law, and Harris, and criticism over the poor use of its supporting cast, particularly McAdams, it was commercially successful, with a worldwide gross of over $543 million.

== Plot ==
In 1891, a series of bombings blamed on political radicals bring France and Germany to the brink of war. Detective Sherlock Holmes narrowly intercepts one bomb that was intended for expert surgeon Dr. Hoffmanstahl, with Holmes' former lover Irene Adler playing a role in placing the bomb. Holmes grabs a letter from Adler and explains to Dr. Hoffmanstahl that the true culprit behind the bombing attempt is Adler's employer, Professor James Moriarty, who soon has both the doctor and Adler assassinated. Holmes discloses to his friend, Dr. John Watson, that he has connected seemingly unrelated murders, terrorist attacks, and business acquisitions to Moriarty.

After meeting with his brother Mycroft at Watson's bachelor party, Holmes meets with Romani fortune-teller Madame Simza, the intended recipient of the letter he took from Adler, sent by her brother René. He defeats an assassin sent to kill her, but she flees.

After the wedding of Watson and Mary Morstan, Holmes meets Moriarty for the first time. The professor taunts him about murdering Adler and threatens to kill Watson and Mary due to Holmes' interference, while the detective vows to defeat him.

Soon, Moriarty's men ambush Watson and Mary on a train to their honeymoon in Brighton. Holmes throws Mary from the train into a river, where she is rescued by Mycroft. After defeating Moriarty's men, Holmes and Watson travel to Paris and locate Simza. Holmes and Watson tell her she has been targeted because René is working for Moriarty and may have told her his plans.

Simza takes the pair to the headquarters of an anarchist group to which she and René belonged, and which has been forced to plant bombs for Moriarty. The trio follows Holmes' deduction that the next bomb is in the Paris Opera. It is actually in a nearby hotel, where it kills several businessmen – a cover-up for the assassination of gun manufacturer Alfred Meinhard by Sebastian Moran, an expert sharpshooter and Moriarty's henchman; Meinhard's death soon grants Moriarty ownership of the former's arms factory in Heilbronn.

The trio follows Moriarty to Germany. At the factory, Moriarty captures, interrogates, and tortures Holmes, injuring his shoulder, while Watson fights Moran. Holmes spells out Moriarty's plot, revealing that the Professor acquired shares in multiple war profiteering companies and intends to instigate a world war to earn himself a fortune.

Watson uses a cannon to destroy the watchtower where Moran is concealed. The structure collapses into the warehouse where Moriarty is holding Holmes captive. Soon, Holmes, Watson and Simza escape. Once out of the factory, Holmes deduces that Moriarty's final goal will be to create an international incident at a peace summit in Switzerland. He also deduces that René will be the assassin, disguised as one of the attending ambassadors, having been given radical reconstructive surgery by Hoffmanstahl.

At the peace summit, Holmes and Moriarty meet on a balcony to discuss their plans over a game of chess. Watson and Simza stop René's assassination attempt, but René is killed by Moran. Despite his war being averted, Moriarty remains confident in his victory, predicting to Holmes that the nations of Europe will inevitably go to war with one another. Holmes reveals that, while being tortured by Moriarty, he replaced the professor's notebook that contained his plans and financing with a duplicate, whilst the original was sent to Mary, who decrypted the code using a book on horticulture in Moriarty's office, before passing the information to Inspector Lestrade, who seizes Moriarty's assets and donates his fortune to charities for war widows and orphans.

Holmes and Moriarty anticipate a fight, and both realise that Moriarty will win due to Holmes' injured shoulder. With Moriarty vowing to kill Watson and Mary, Holmes drags him over the balcony just as Watson arrives, and the two fall into the Reichenbach Falls.

Following Holmes's funeral, Watson and Mary prepare to have their belated honeymoon in Brighton when the doctor receives a package containing Mycroft's breathing device, which Sherlock briefly used before the summit. Realising that Holmes may be alive, Watson leaves his office to ask Mary about the delivery man; while Holmes, having concealed himself, reads Watson's memoirs on the typewriter and adds a question mark after the words "The End".

== Cast ==
- Robert Downey Jr. as Sherlock Holmes
- Jude Law as Dr. John Watson
- Jared Harris as Professor James Moriarty, a criminal mastermind serving under the guise of a mathematics professor.
- Noomi Rapace as Madame Simza "Sim" Heron
- Stephen Fry as Mycroft Holmes
- Kelly Reilly as Mary Morstan
- Rachel McAdams as Irene Adler
- Eddie Marsan as Inspector Lestrade
- Paul Anderson as Sebastian Moran
- Geraldine James as Mrs. Hudson
- Thierry Neuvic as Claude Ravache
- Fatima Adoum as a Manouche
- Wolf Kahler as Dr. Hoffmanstahl. Kahler previously appeared in the Granada Television series The Adventures of Sherlock Holmes, as the King of Bohemia in A Scandal in Bohemia.
- Affif Ben Badra as Tamas Morato
- William Houston as Constable Clark

== Production ==
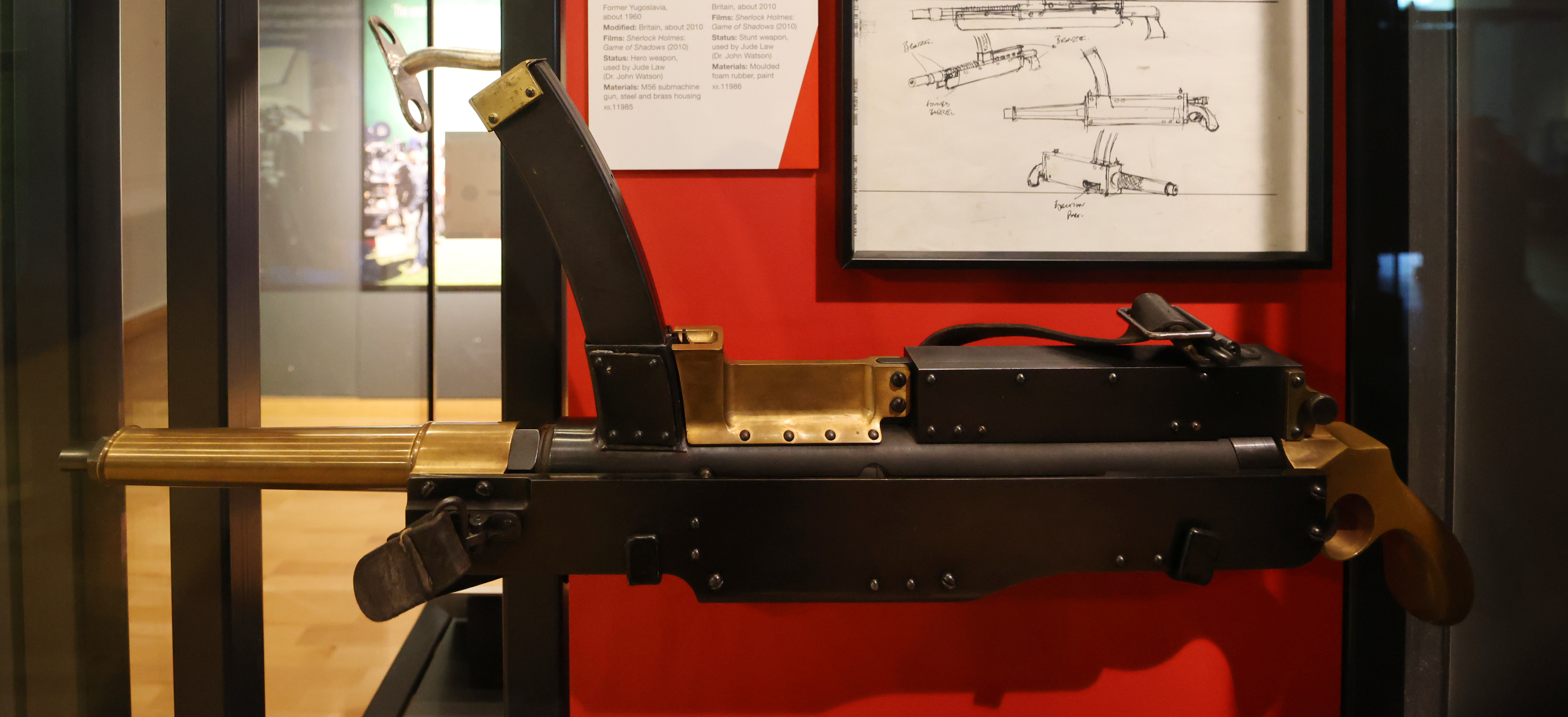
Prop submachine gun used in the film

After the success of the 2009 film Sherlock Holmes, a sequel was fast-tracked by Warner Bros. Pictures with director Guy Ritchie dropping out of an adaptation of Lobo and Robert Downey Jr. leaving Cowboys & Aliens.

It was unclear if Rachel McAdams would appear in the film; McAdams said, "If I do, it won't be a very big thing. It's not a lead part." Warner Bros. later confirmed to Entertainment Weekly that McAdams would play a part in the sequel but that it would be a cameo appearance. The female lead role was played by Noomi Rapace. Joel Silver, the film's producer, has said that "we always intended to have a different kind of girl for each movie" in the vein of Bond girls. He found it "complicated" to persuade McAdams to return in a smaller role: "She loved being with us, but she hoped to have a bigger role. I think at the end of the day it worked out fine." The death of Adler in the film left many fans speculating her character faked her demise.

The film, then under the working title of Sherlock Holmes 2, was reported to be influenced by Conan Doyle's "The Final Problem". While the film took place a year after the events of the first film, Sherlock Holmes: A Game of Shadows was intended to be a stand-alone film that did not require knowledge of the previous movie.

In October 2010, the steamship PS Waverley was chartered on the English Channel for filming, and a large green screen was erected at Didcot Railway Centre, where a large action scene was filmed the following month. In late November, a scene was filmed at Victoria Bridge in Worcestershire, England. In January 2011, scenes were also filmed at Hampton Court Palace and areas in Oxford University.

In early February 2011, principal photography moved for two days to Strasbourg, France. Shooting took place on, around, and inside Strasbourg Cathedral. The scene was said at the time to be the opening scene of the film, as it covered an assassination and bombing in a German-speaking town.

The production also filmed at several locations in Kent including Fort Amherst, Knole and The Historic Dockyard Chatham. The White Cliffs of Dover are also briefly featured in the movie, as is the Old Royal Naval College in Greenwich. Several scenes were also filmed at Elstree Studios in Hertfordshire.

=== Music ===
Hans Zimmer composed the film's score. In addition to featuring existing works by Johann Strauss II, Wolfgang Amadeus Mozart, Ennio Morricone, and Franz Schubert, Zimmer included elements from authentic Romani music. Zimmer, accompanied by director Guy Ritchie and some of Zimmer's musicians, traveled to France, Italy, and Slovakia to research the local music firsthand and to "listen to as many musicians as we could." Deeply impressed, Zimmer arranged for 13 of the local musicians — with their personal violins and accordions — to join him in Vienna at a studio for a recording session. Zimmer incorporated this Romani music into the score for the film. It was reported a portion of proceeds from the soundtrack would be given to the impoverished Romani villages to help pay for necessities, such as water and heat.

== Release ==
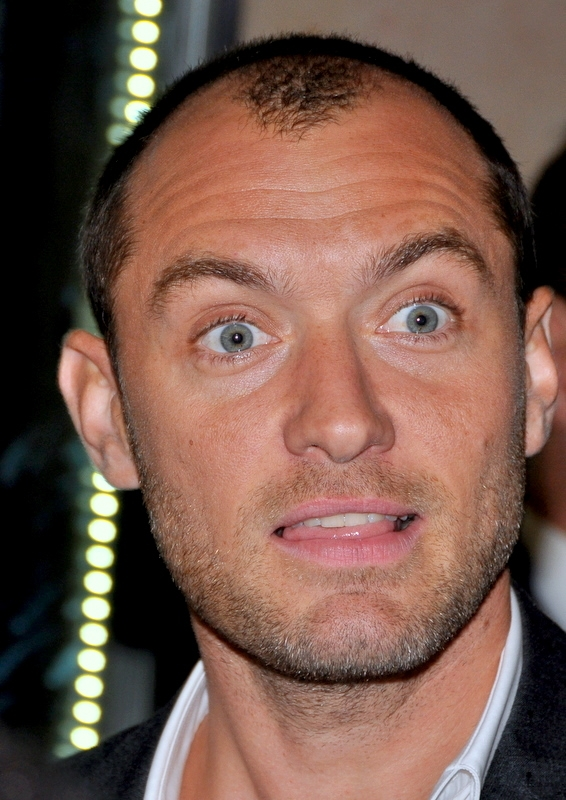
Jude Law in January 2012 at the film's French premiere in Paris

Sherlock Holmes: A Game of Shadows was released on 16 December 2011 in Canada, Mexico, Russia, the United States, and the United Kingdom; on 25 December 2011 in most other countries; and on 5 January 2012 in Australia, Poland, and Spain.

=== Home media ===
The film was released on DVD and Blu-ray on 12 June 2012 for Region 1 and 14 May 2012 for Region 2 and Region 4.

== Reception ==
=== Box office ===
Sherlock Holmes: A Game of Shadows earned $186.8 million in North America as well as $357 million in other territories for a worldwide total of $543.4 million. It was the 12th-highest-grossing film of 2011 worldwide.

In North America, it topped the box office on its opening day with $14.6 million, down from the opening-day gross of the previous film, $24.6 million. During the weekend, it grossed $39.6 million, leading the box office but earning approximately two-thirds as much as its predecessor on its opening weekend. By the end of its theatrical run, it became the ninth-highest-grossing film of 2011 in the US.

Outside North America, the film earned $14.6 million on its opening weekend, finishing in third place. It topped the overseas box office during three consecutive weekends in January 2012. It eventually surpassed its predecessor's foreign total of $315 million. In the UK, Ireland and Malta, its highest-grossing market after North America, the film achieved a first-place opening of £3.83 million ($5.95 million) over a three-day period, compared to the £3.08 million earned in two days by the original film. It earned $42.2 million in total in this market. In the Commonwealth of Independent States and in Italy, the film earned $28.4 million and $24.5 million, respectively.

=== Critical response ===
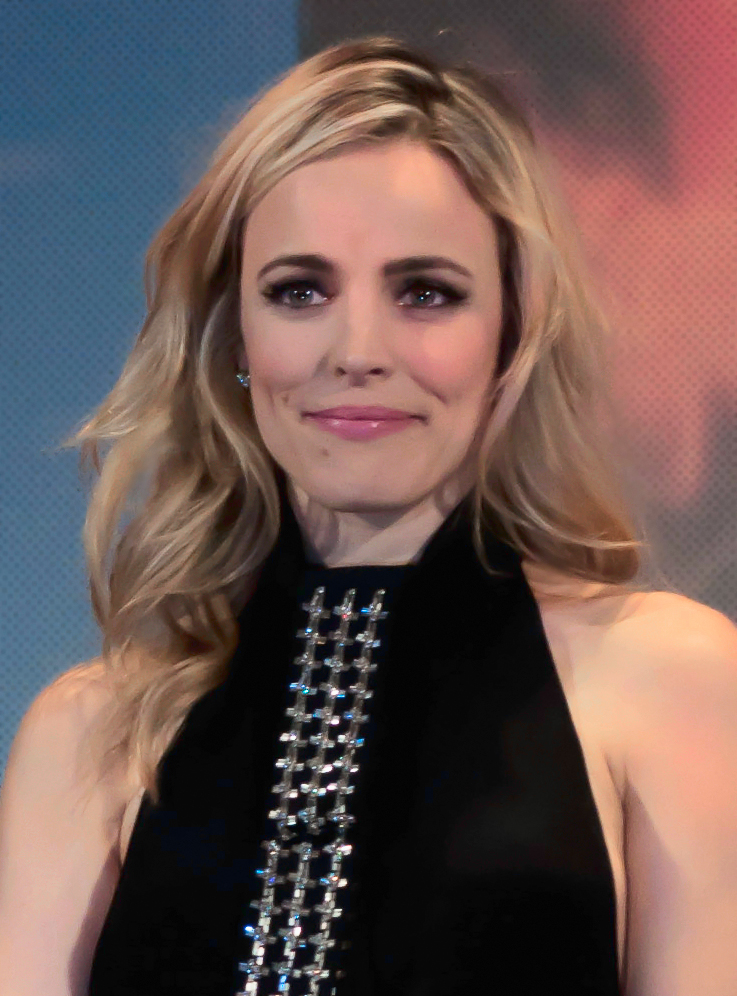
Some critics felt that Rachel McAdams (pictured), Noomi Rapace, Kelly Reilly and Stephen Fry had been underused.

Review aggregator website Rotten Tomatoes reports an approval rating of 60% based on 224 reviews, with an average rating of 6/10. The site's critical consensus reads, "Sherlock Holmes: A Game of Shadows is a good yarn thanks to its well-matched leading men but overall stumbles duplicating the well-oiled thrills of the original." Metacritic, which assigns a weighted average rating to reviews, gives the film a score of 48 out of 100, based on 38 critics, indicating "mixed or average reviews". Audiences polled by CinemaScore gave the film an average grade of "A−" on an A+ to F scale, higher than the previous film's "B".

Roger Ebert, who gave the first film three stars, was even more positive in his review for the sequel, awarding it three-and-a-half stars and calling it "high-caliber entertainment" that "add[s] a degree of refinement and invention" to the formula. He also said the writers "wisely devote some of their best scenes to one-on-ones between Holmes and Moriarty." Xan Brooks of The Guardian gave the film four out of five stars. James Berardinelli gave the film three stars out of four, writing, "A Game of Shadows is a stronger, better-realized movie that builds upon the strengths of the original and jettisons some of the weaknesses." Conversely, Keith Phipps of The A.V. Club felt the film "aims lower than its predecessor's modest ambition and still misses the mark." Empire film critic Ian Nathan gave the film three out of five stars, and although critical of Sim, called the sequel overall "bigger, better, funnier".

Several critics felt that McAdams was underused. Joe Morgenstern of The Wall Street Journal felt "she vanishes all too soon in this overproduced, self-enchanted sequel, and so does the spirit of bright invention that made the previous film such a pleasant surprise." Scott Mendelson of The Huffington Post remarked that she "exhibits far more personality and roguish charm in her few moments here than she did in all of the previous film. Freed from the constraints of being the de-facto love interest, McAdams relishes the chance to go full-villain." Charlotte Skeoch was critical, not just of McAdams' cameo, but of Reilly's and Rapace's roles, especially with the former, even panning Sim's characterisation. She also criticised Fry's small role and gave the film a mixed review.

Emmet Asher-Perrin of Tor.com said "I was sort of thrilled that Irene Adler was taken out of the picture so quickly. While I didn't mind the position the character occupied in the narrative of the last movie, Rachel McAdams' Adler never meshed well with this particular Holmes. The near-paternal tint in his affection for her was bothersome, and not missed this time around". A. O. Scott of the New York Times was critical of the lack of Marsan.

Rachel Bowles was critical of Rapace and Fry, feeling that the Mycroft "scenes contain more gratuitous gags that don’t really do Fry’s brand of intelligent and subtle humour justice."

In 2015, film critic Scout Tafoya of RogerEbert.com included A Game of Shadows in his video series "The Unloved", where he highlights films which received mixed to negative reviews yet he believes to have artistic value. He praised the film's deconstruction of action scenes through stylistic editing, one inspired by Soviet montage which was exemplified in Sergei Eisenstein's 1925 film Battleship Potemkin, as well as the friendship and constant banter between Holmes and Watson at the center of the film, which "highlight[s] the difficulty in achieving lyrical deftness of dialogue in films of this budget", with their friendship reminding Tafoya of how "we can invite danger and fun into our lives in equal measure all the time, but once in a blue moon, they make life worth living." Tafoya considers A Game of Shadows to be his eighth-favourite film of the 21st century.

=== Accolades ===
List of awards and nominations
Year	Award	Category	Recipients	Result	Ref.
2012	Saturn Awards	Best Action/Adventure Film	Sherlock Holmes: A Game of Shadows	Nominated	
2012	Saturn Awards	Best Costume	Jenny Beavan	Nominated	
2012	Teen Choice Awards	Choice Movie: Action	Sherlock Holmes: A Game of Shadows	Nominated	
2012	Teen Choice Awards	Choice Movie Actor: Action	Robert Downey Jr.	Nominated	
2012	Teen Choice Awards	Choice Movie Actress: Action	Noomi Rapace	Nominated	
2012	Visual Effects Society Awards	Outstanding Supporting Visual Effects in a Feature Motion Picture	Laya Armian, Chas Jarrett, Seth Maury, Sirio Quintavalle	Nominated	

== Future ==
=== Possible sequel ===
In 2011, Warner Bros. Pictures announced the first draft for Sherlock Holmes 3 was being written by screenwriter Drew Pearce; he was later replaced by Justin Haythe. Jude Law commented on the project in late 2013, saying, "We had a meeting earlier this year, the three of us, and I think it's being written now. Warner Bros. have still got to agree to pay for it... I think they want to!" He added, "It's a slow process. We're all busy. So getting us together to try to nail that has taken a little bit longer than we had hoped." In 2014, Susan Downey stated that a third film was in development: "There's an idea, there's an outline, there is not a script yet. Trust me, the studio would love there to be a script. But our feeling is, we gotta get it right."

Producer Lionel Wigram said in 2015 that both Downey Jr. and Law would reprise their roles from the first two films. In 2016, Downey claimed the film would begin shooting later in the year, but the same month, it was revealed that James Coyne was hired to rewrite the script. After more delays, Wigram later speculated in 2017 that the film would begin shooting in 2018. Warner Bros. stated in 2018 that the third film was scheduled for release on December 25, 2020, with Downey, Law and Anderson reprising their roles and Chris Brancato writing the script.

In 2019, the release date was pushed to December 22, 2021, and it was announced that Ritchie would be replaced by Dexter Fletcher as the film's director. The film was approved for a $20.9 million tax break by the California Film Commission in May 2019, against a projected production budget of $107.8 million.

Fletcher said in 2021 that the film was delayed indefinitely due to the ongoing COVID-19 pandemic, stating, "We started going and then Covid hit, and they were like, 'Look we're going to stand it down and Robert has got something else he wants to do'...These things are so big that you don't wanna just chisel them into something... I know that Robert will not let that fish off the hook." In 2023, Fletcher said that he, Downey, and writer Joe Penhall were working on the script in Downey's home, reiterating that the pandemic affected development and their personal plans, schedules, and priorities in terms of projects. Susan Downey and Team Downey collaborator Amanda Burrell later confirmed that the project was still a priority for the company and for Downey.

=== Franchise ===
By October 2020, Robert Downey Jr. and Susan Downey announced plans to expand the film series into a franchise. Team Downey is working on installments including additional films, spin-offs, television series for HBO Max, and other media in a shared universe. Though they do not intend to copy the Marvel Cinematic Universe, the pair acknowledged that they felt that working with Marvel Studios taught them much with regards to world-building. As of 2022, two television series set in the films' universe were in development for HBO Max.
