= Ettore Troilo =

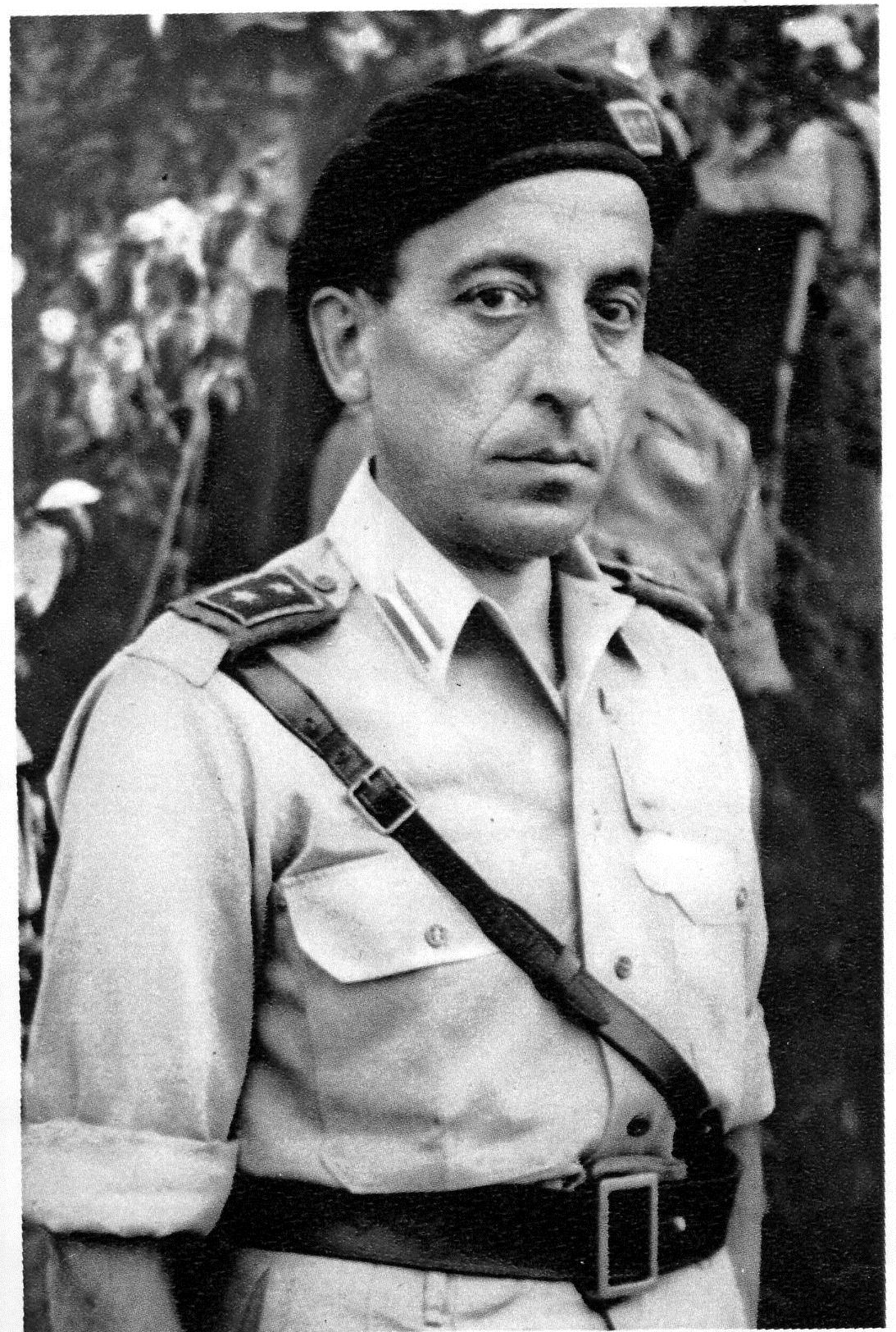
- Born: 10 April 1898; Torricella Peligna, Kingdom of Italy
- Died: 5 June 1974 (aged 76); Rome, Italy
- Burial place: Sacrario della Brigata Maiella, Taranta Peligna; 42.02344074191305°N 14.165515584363753°E
- Education: Sapienza University of Rome
- Spouse: Letizia Piccone (m. 1929)
- Children: Nicola; Carlo; Michele
- Military career
- Allegiance: Italy
- Service years: 1916-1920; 1943-1945
- Commands: Maiella Brigade
- Conflicts: World War I; Battle of Caporetto; Battle of Vittorio Veneto; World War II; Italian campaign
- Awards: Order of Merit of the Italian Republic; Silver Medal of Military Valor; War Merit Cross

Ettore Enzo Fimiani Troilo (10 April 1898 – 5 June 1974) was an Italian Resistance leader during World War II.

== Biography ==
=== Early life ===
The son of a doctor, he enlisted as a volunteer in the Great War at age 18, fighting as an artilleryman; he was captured in February 1917 but freed by an Italian counterattack, and later participated in the battle of Caporetto and in the battle of Vittorio Veneto, earning a War Merit Cross and ending the war with the rank of corporal. In 1922 he graduated in law at the Sapienza University of Rome, after which he practiced as a lawyer in a firm in Milan; there he met the reformist socialist leader Filippo Turati, who in turn introduced him to Giacomo Matteotti, of whom he became a friend and collaborator until his murder by Fascists in 1924. He also joined the Italian Socialist Party. He wrote for the newspaper Il Mondo until 1926, when it was closed down by the Fascist regime. During the Fascist period Troilo, who had ended up on police records for his anti-fascist activities, worked as a lawyer and had both his office and his house repeatedly subjected to police searches.

=== Second World War ===
In January 1943 Troilo joined the underground Action Party. After the fall of the Fascist regime, in July of the same year, he was part of a group who demanded and obtained the release of anti-fascist prisoners from the Regina Coeli prison in Rome. On 10 and 11 September 1943, in the wake of the armistice of Cassibile, Troilo participated in the unsuccessful defense of Rome against the Germans; after the occupation of the capital he headed for his native town, Torricella Peligna, where he was captured by German soldiers, but later managed to escape. In early December 1943 he made contact with British officers, who had reached Casoli in Abruzzo, and submitted his proposal for the creation of an apolitical corps of volunteers that would fight alongside the 8th Army for the liberation of Italy. The plan was initially rejected, but the situation changed with the arrival of Major Lionel Wigram, who embraced Troilo's idea and supported it with his superiors, helping Troilo overcome British diffidence towards the former Italian enemies. Troilo was thus able to obtain weaponry, ammunition and equipment, and began recruiting volunteers for his group which he named Corpo Volontari della Maiella ("Corps of Volunteers of the Maiella").

The Volontari della Maiella, initially a hundred men under Troilo's leadership (although he held no formal command), started operating in January 1944, and soon grew to some 350 members; under the joint leadership of Troilo and Major Wigram (for this, the group was also known to the British as "Wigforce"), on 15 January 1944 the volunteers captured Colle dei Lami, and two days later Colle Ripabianca. Between late January and early February the volunteers liberated Quadri, Torricella Peligna and Lama dei Peligni, but on 3 February an attack on Pizzoferrato, held by units of the 305th Infantry Division, was repelled and Wigram was killed. On 20 February Troilo, with a group of twenty men, managed to repel a series of German attacks on Fallascoso, a hamlet of Torricella Peligna located on the Gustav Line, and eight days later the Banda Patrioti della Maiella was officially recognized as a military unit by Marshal of Italy Giovanni Messe, chief of staff of the Italian Co-belligerent Army, and formally attached to the 209th Infantry Division.

The group was later enlarged and reorganized as the "Maiella Brigade"; its men received better weaponry and started wearing British uniforms with collar patches that bore the Italian tricolor rather than the traditional five-pointed stars used by the Royal Italian Army, as members of the Maiella Brigade were republicans and refused to swear loyalty to the king. During the spring and summer of 1944 the Brigade participated in the Allied advance along the Adriatic coast of Italy, providing guides for the Allied units, carrying out reconnaissance missions and garrisoning liberated towns; it participated in the liberation of Campo di Giove, Pacentro, Cansano, Caramanico Terme, Sant'Eufemia, Popoli, Tocco da Casauria, Bussi sul Tirino, Pratola Peligna and Sulmona. Even after the liberation of Abruzzo, where its members had been recruited, in June 1944, the Brigade continued fighting alongside the 8th Army through the Marche and Emilia Romagna, as part of the II Polish Corps, participating in the battle of Bologna in April 1945. Its vanguards entered Asiago in Veneto on 1 May 1945, one day before the surrender of Caserta; by this point, the Brigade had grown to a strength of 1,500 men, and many more volunteers had had to be turned down due to the lack of weapons and equipment to arm them.

=== Postwar ===
The brigade was formally disbanded on 15 July 1945, after which Troilo became an inspector of the Ministry of Post-War Assistance. In January 1946 he was appointed prefect of Milan by the De Gasperi government, succeeding Riccardo Lombardi who had become Minister of Transport. He was removed from office on 27 November 1947 by decision of the Minister of the Interior, Christian Democrat Mario Scelba. The news of his replacement with the prefect of Turin Vincenzo Ciotola, a career official, caused a harsh reaction from the left, which occupied the prefecture of Milan with its militants - including former armed partisans - led by Giancarlo Pajetta, while Socialist mayor Antonio Greppi (an old acquaintance of Troilo, who had attended the same Socialist circles in the early 1920s) and 156 mayors of the municipalities of the Milanese hinterland resigned en masse in protest. In response, Scelba ordered the "Legnano" Infantry Division to temporarily assume prefectural powers and command of the city, but the government eventually decided to negotiate, and a delegation of the Italian Communist Party was sent to Rome to talk with Scelba and De Gasperi. In the end, the occupants accepted the dismissal of Troilo, in exchange for not being prosecuted. In application of the agreement, on the evening of November 28 Undersecretary of the Interior Achille Marazza arrived in Milan and took possession of the prefecture without bloodshed.

On 3 December Troilo definitively abandoned his office, and the occupation therefore ended peacefully. He was offered a post at the United Nations as Italy's minister plenipotentiary for information problems and promotion to first class prefect, which he accepted. In January 1948, however, he resigned from office and as prefect and ran in the general elections of April of that year as an independent candidate on the list of the People's Democratic Front, but he was not elected. Despite the role he had played in the fight for Italy's liberation, Troilo subsequently refused any political and military honor, including a war pension, believing that he had fulfilled his duty. In 1953 he was among the founders of the Socialist Autonomy movement, which took part in the general elections with the goal of preventing the new majority bonus voting law from taking effect. He spent the last decades of his life working as a lawyer, as well as honoring the memory of the "Maiella" Brigade. He managed to have a shrine to the Brigade's fallen built in Taranta Peligna, and was among the founders of the Institute for the History of the Resistance Movement in L’Aquila. He died in Rome in 1974.
