= Pentri =

Tribe of the Samnites

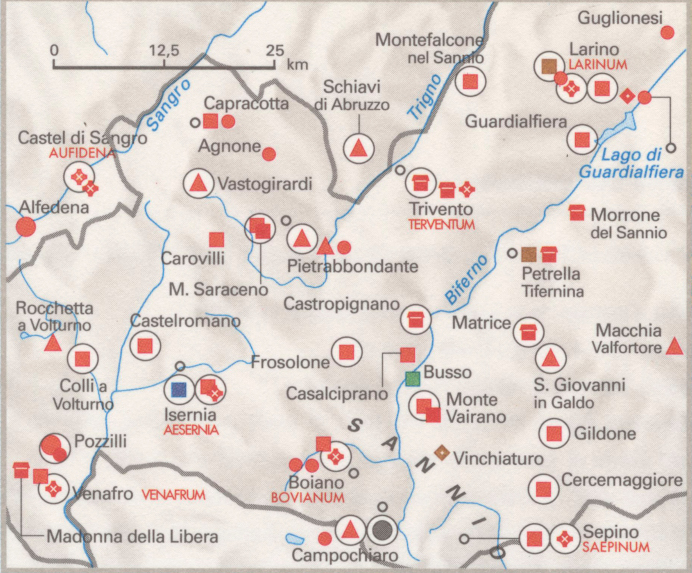
Archeological sites in Pentri's Samnium

The Pentri were a tribe of the Samnites, and apparently one of the most important of the subdivisions of that nation. According to Salmon, their name shares the same Indo-European root found in the Celtic pen- <peak>. Their capital city was Bovianum Undecumanorum (Livy ix. 31), modern Bojano, in the very heart of the Samnite territory, and it is therefore probable that they occupied the whole of that rugged and mountainous district which extends from the frontiers of Latium, in the valley of the Liris (modern Liri), to those of the Frentani, towards the Adriatic Sea. But it is impossible to determine their exact limits, or to separate their history from that of the remaining Samnites. It is probable, indeed, that, throughout the long wars of the Romans with the Samnites, the Pentri were the leading tribe of the latter people, and always took part in the war, whether specified or not. The only occasion when we hear of their separating themselves from the rest of their countrymen, is during the Second Punic War, when we are told that all the other Samnites, except the Pentri, declared in favour of Hannibal after the battle of Cannae, 216 BC. (Liv. xxii. 61.) This is the last occasion on which we find their name in history; all trace of the distinction between them and the other Samnites seems to have been subsequently lost, and their name is not even mentioned by Strabo or Pliny.
