= Castello ducale di Crecchio =

Coordinates: 42.2966°N 14.3266°E

Ducal Castle of Crecchio
- Castello ducale di Crecchio
- Crecchio
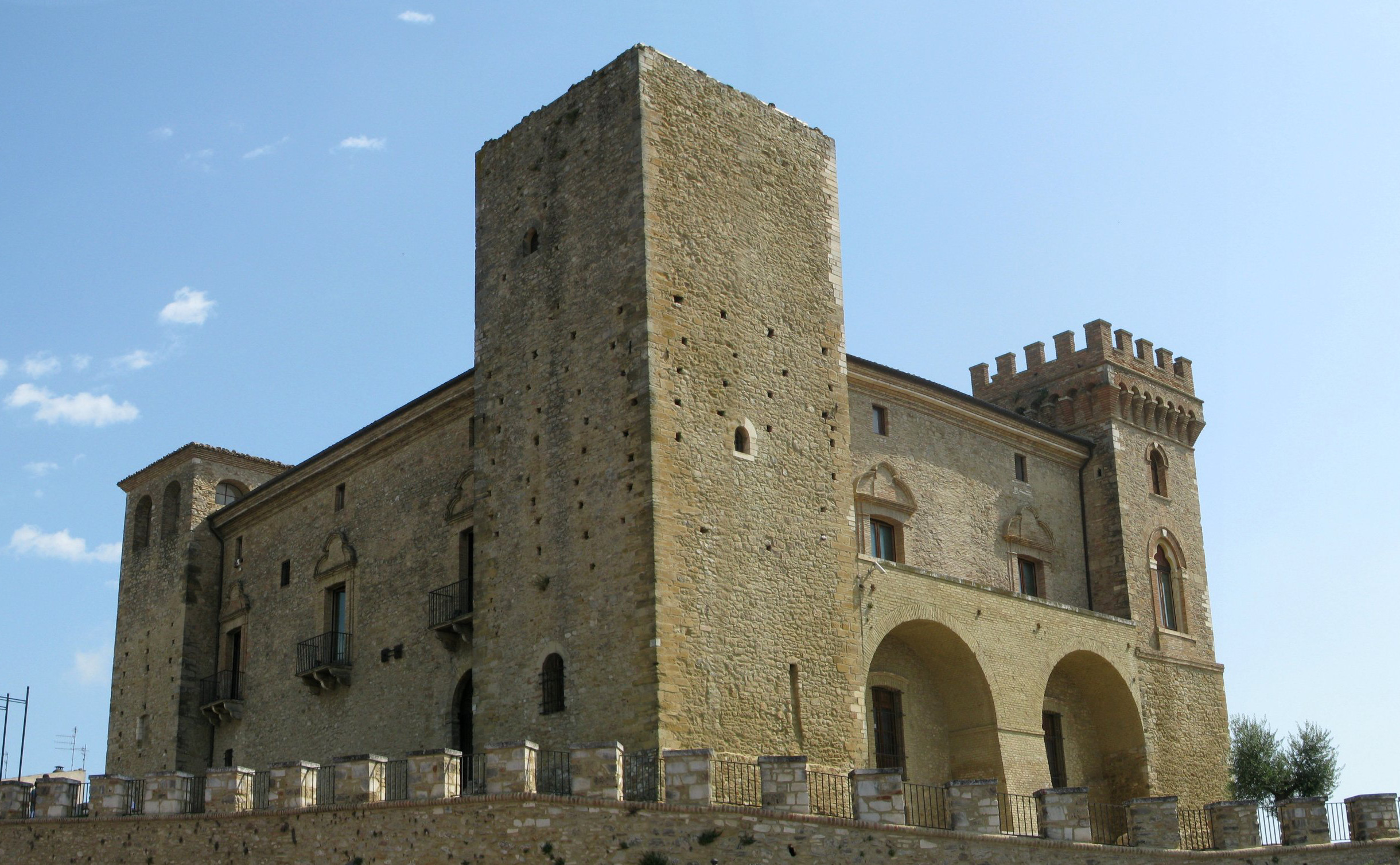
- Castle in Crecchio

Site information
- Type: Castle
- Condition: Museum

Location

Site history
- Built: 13th century
- Built by: Lombards

Castello ducale di Crecchio (Italian for Ducal Castle of Crecchio) is a Middle Ages castle in Crecchio, Province of Chieti (Abruzzo).

== History ==
The castle was built by the Lombards in the eighth century, and later went into the possession of the Normans. In the fifteenth century the castle was restored by the Aragona family, and then went into the possession of the family De Riseis. In 1943 the castle was home to the King Vittorio Emanuele III, fleeing towards Brindisi, and then, in World War II, it was bombed by the Allies. The castle was later rebuilt completely, respecting its original appearance, and houses a museum of Byzantine Abruzzo finds.

== Architecture ==
The castle has a square plan, with walls, and an access bridge. The oldest tower is built by the Lombards (8th century), while the other three corner towers date back to the Aragonese period. The structure, outside, has compared the mansion, with balconies and highly decorated windows. The interior has only an old room, the one that hosted the King Vittorio Emanuele, with its original bed, because the others were destroyed in World War II, and later rebuilt as exhibition rooms for the Byzantine museum.
