= Lionel Wigram (British Army officer) =

British Army officer

Captain Lionel Wigram (1907 in Sheffield, England – 3 February 1944 in Pizzoferrato Abruzzi Region, Italy) was a British Army officer. He played a significant part in developing British infantry fighting tactics in the Second World War.

== Early years ==
The son of Maurice Wigram, Lionel Wigram was born in Sheffield into a distinguished Jewish family, and later moved to Surrey, becoming a London solicitor and property developer. Wigram was educated at King Edward VII School in Sheffield from 1918 to 1925 and The Queen's College, Oxford. He was married to Olga Wigram née Jokelson and the couple had a daughter, Denia. She was the first wife of Peter Palumbo, the property developer.

== Second World War ==
In 1939, like many thousands of his contemporaries, Lionel Wigram joined the British army at the outbreak of the war. Already commissioned in the Territorial Army, he went on active duty and was commissioned as a Captain into the Royal Fusiliers (City of London Regiment). He was among the founders of the 47th (London) Infantry Division School of Battle Drill in 1941, and was appointed chief instructor at the new GHQ Home Forces Battle School at Barnard Castle early in 1942. This was set up by GHQ Home Forces in the aftermath of the disastrous 1940 campaign in France. British Army battle drill – systematic tactics for small front line units – had been developed during the First World War but had to be revived by the then Lieutenant-General Harold Alexander in I Corps after the evacuation of Dunkirk. Wigram played the leading part in spreading this approach to the whole of the Home Army.

In July 1943 he went to Sicily, in the temporary rank of Lieutenant colonel, to observe the behaviour of infantrymen in battle. His principal finding was that on average a British Army platoon would be 25% "gutful," men who would go anywhere and do anything, 50% "sheep," men who would follow closely behind if well led, and about 25% "cowards," who quickly ran or became ineffectual once the fighting started. This finding has been approximately confirmed by later work. However, it made uncomfortable reading, and General Montgomery suppressed Wigram's report as being bad for morale.

Reverting to the lower rank of Major, he was assigned to the 5th Army Corps deployed in Italy. After the Italian capitulation of 1943, British and American troops quickly conquered Sicily and moved up the Italian mainland. The British and Commonwealth Army advanced on the Italian east coast, while the Americans had the west. However, by winter 1943 the advance was at a standstill at the Gustav line, in central Italy.

While in the Abruzzi region, Wigram quickly sympathized with Ettore Troilo, the Italian partisan leader, and helped him to achieve the goal of having Italian paramilitary forces fighting with the Allied Forces against the Germans. At the time the Italian forces were still viewed as a potential source of problems, and although they were officially won to the cause the Allied had little or no confidence in them. Wigram managed to persuade the British and American military leaders to equip and use Italian troops (regular or partisans) as auxiliary forces. This resulted in the creation of the Volunteer Corps of the Maiella Brigade. The joint military force of British and Italian troops was nicknamed "Wigforce".

Wigram was killed in action while leading the Wigforce during the hapless attack at Pizzoferrato village in the Abruzzi region; he is interred at Moro River Canadian War Cemetery (XVI.B.9 Camp) in Ortona. Though married in the West London Synagogue, Lionel's widow asked that no religious symbol be placed on his grave and so the CWGC Star of David is missing.

== Legacy ==
Lionel Wigram (born 1962), the British film producer and screenplay writer based in Los Angeles, was named after his paternal grandfather, Maj Lionel Wigram.
