= Lionel Wigram (film producer) =

British film producer and screenwriter (born 1962)

- Born: 22 December 1962 (age 63); London, England
- Occupations: Film producer, screenwriter

Lionel Nicholas Richard Wigram (born 22 December 1962) is a British film producer and screenwriter. He is the grandson of the war hero Lionel Wigram.

== Education ==
Wigram was educated at Eton College and the University of Oxford, where he was a co-founder of the Oxford Film Foundation.

== Career ==
Wigram started working as a runner for producer Elliott Kastner. After his job for Kastner for several years, he eventually produced several low budget films for him in partnership with Cassian Elwes. He then spent ten years working in the independent world both as an executive and as a producer. He ran Geena Davis and Renny Harlin's company, The Forge, and worked at Shep Gordon and Carolyn Pfeiffer's company, Alive Films.

Wigram was named a senior vice president of production at Warner Bros. in November 2000. As a studio executive, he was responsible for buying the Harry Potter book series for the studio, as well as overseeing the eight-film series. In addition, Wigram also championed such films as Three Kings, Charlotte Gray and The Big Tease. He later transitioned from executive to independent producer with a first look deal at Warner Bros. During his tenure, Wigram produced the 2009 hit film Sherlock Holmes. Wigram also co-wrote the story for the film. He was also a producer on the sequel, Sherlock Holmes: A Game of Shadows. Wigram was also executive producer of the last four Harry Potter films, as well as August Rush and Legend of the Guardians: The Owls of Ga'Hoole.

In 2012, Wigram started a joint production company with his frequent collaborator, Guy Ritchie, called Ritchie/Wigram Productions. The company's first film, The Man from U.N.C.L.E., was released in August 2015.

== Filmography ==
Year	Title	Writer	Producer	Notes
1989	Never on Tuesday	No	Yes	
1989	Warm Summer Rain	No	Yes	
1991	Cool as Ice	No	Yes	Also second unit director
2009	Sherlock Holmes	Story	Yes	
2011	Sherlock Holmes: A Game of Shadows	No	Yes	
2014	Seventh Son	No	Yes	
2015	The Man from U.N.C.L.E.	Yes	Yes	
2016	Fantastic Beasts and Where to Find Them	No	Yes	
2017	King Arthur: Legend of the Sword	Yes	Yes	
2018	Fantastic Beasts: The Crimes of Grindelwald	No	Yes	
2022	Fantastic Beasts: The Secrets of Dumbledore	No	Yes	

Executive producer

- The Underneath (1995)
- Harry Potter and the Order of the Phoenix (2007)
- August Rush (2007)
- Harry Potter and the Half-Blood Prince (2009)
- Legend of the Guardians: The Owls of Ga'Hoole (2010)
- Harry Potter and the Deathly Hallows – Part 1 (2010)
- Harry Potter and the Deathly Hallows – Part 2 (2011)

Other credits

Year	Title	Role
1984	Oxford Blues	Production liaison
1986	Heat	Production assistant

== Personal ==
Wigram is married with two daughters.
