= Juvanum =

Coordinates: 41.997895°N 14.249799°E

- Iuvanum
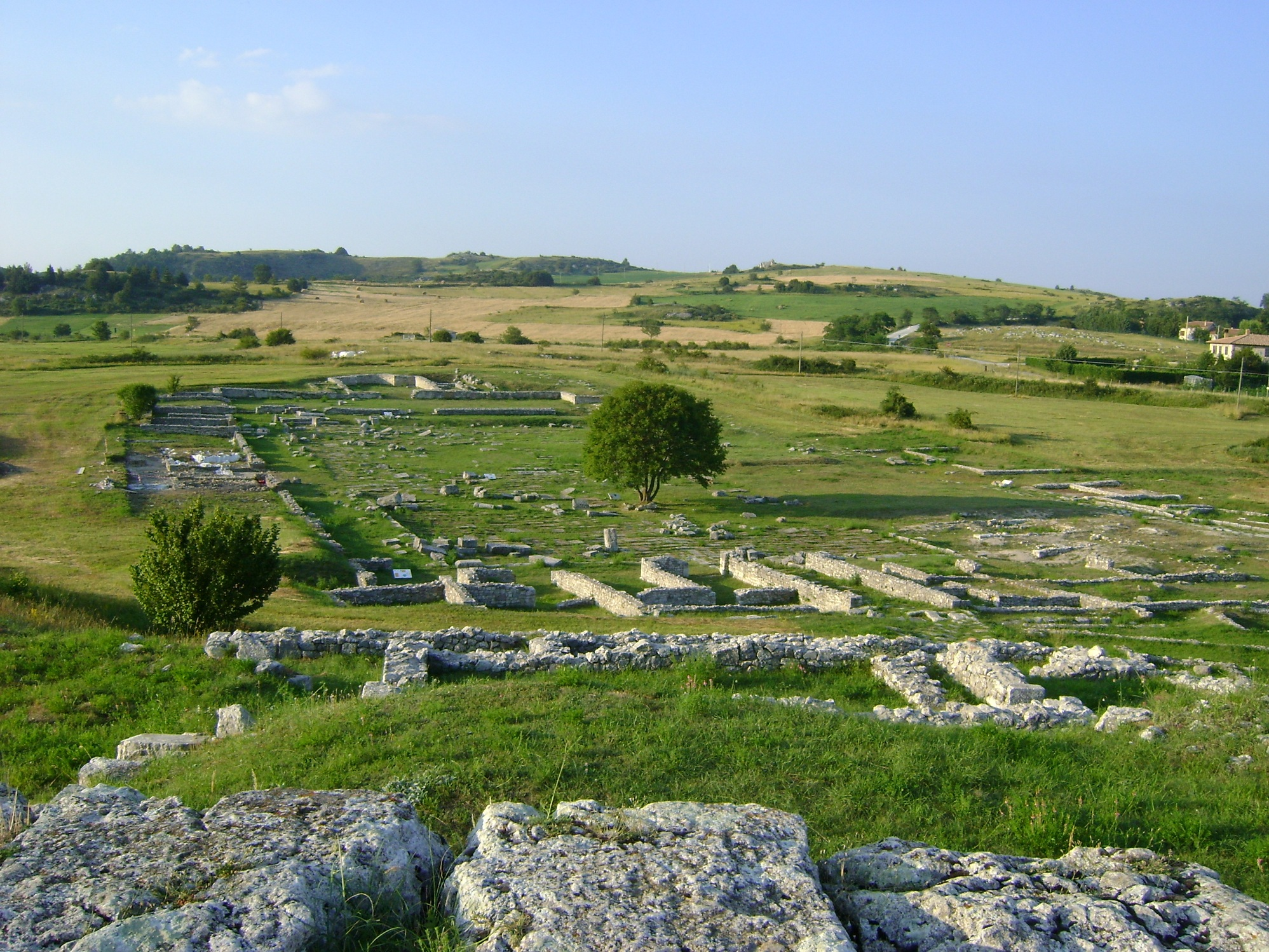
- View of Juvanum

- Location within Abruzzo
- Cultures: Ancient Rome
- Region: Abruzzo

Juvanum or Jovanum was one of the chief cities of the Caraceni, a tribe of Samnites, the ruins of which are located in the communes of Montenerodomo and Torricella Peligna, in the province of Chieti in the Abruzzo region of Italy.

It is an archaeological site, and the ruins encompass a forum, temple, and basilica, and remains of the Roman conquest during the Social War after which youths were settled at the site (whence, in some views, its Latin name).

The site is open to the public.

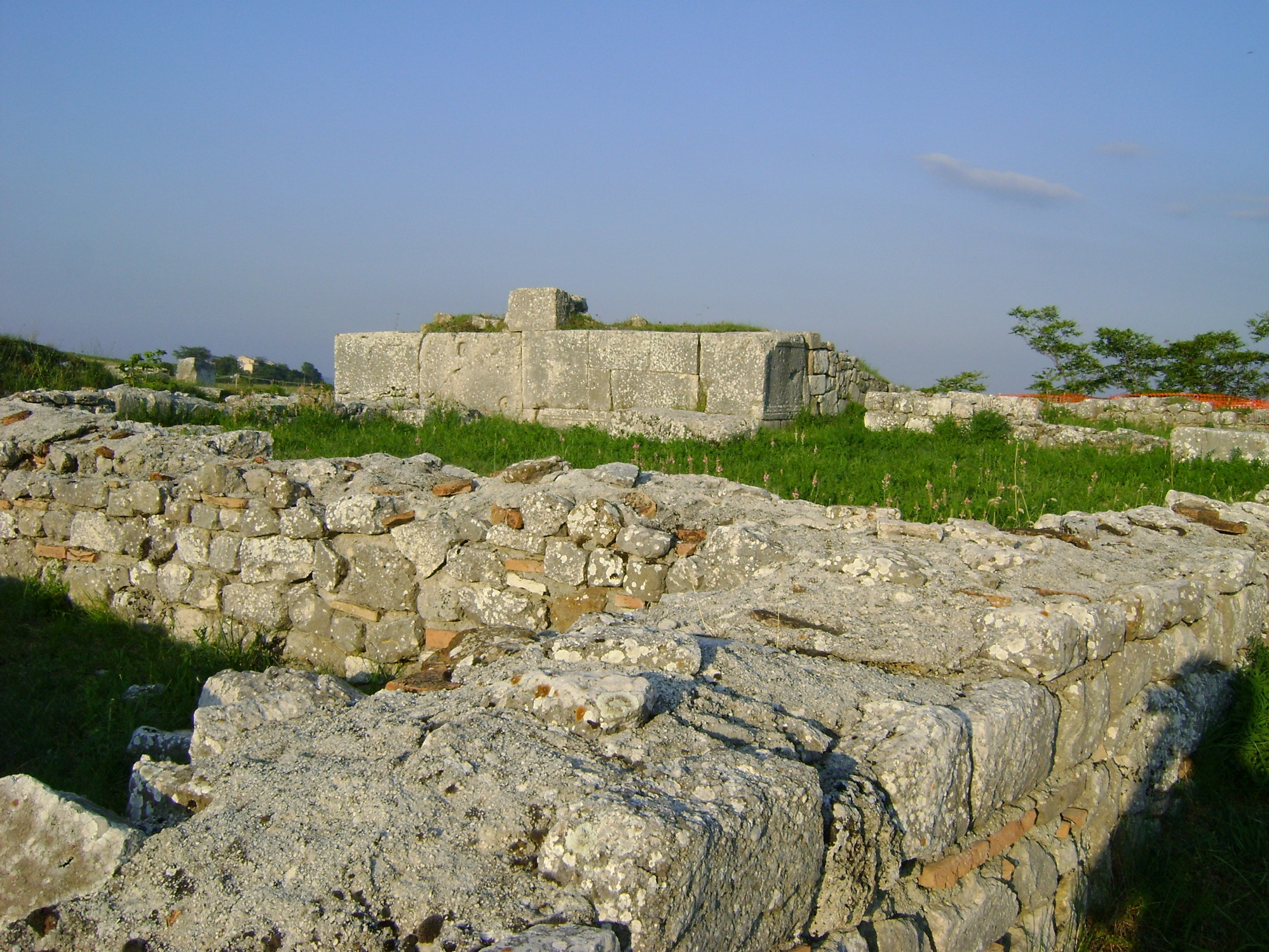
Basilica maggiore of Juvanum

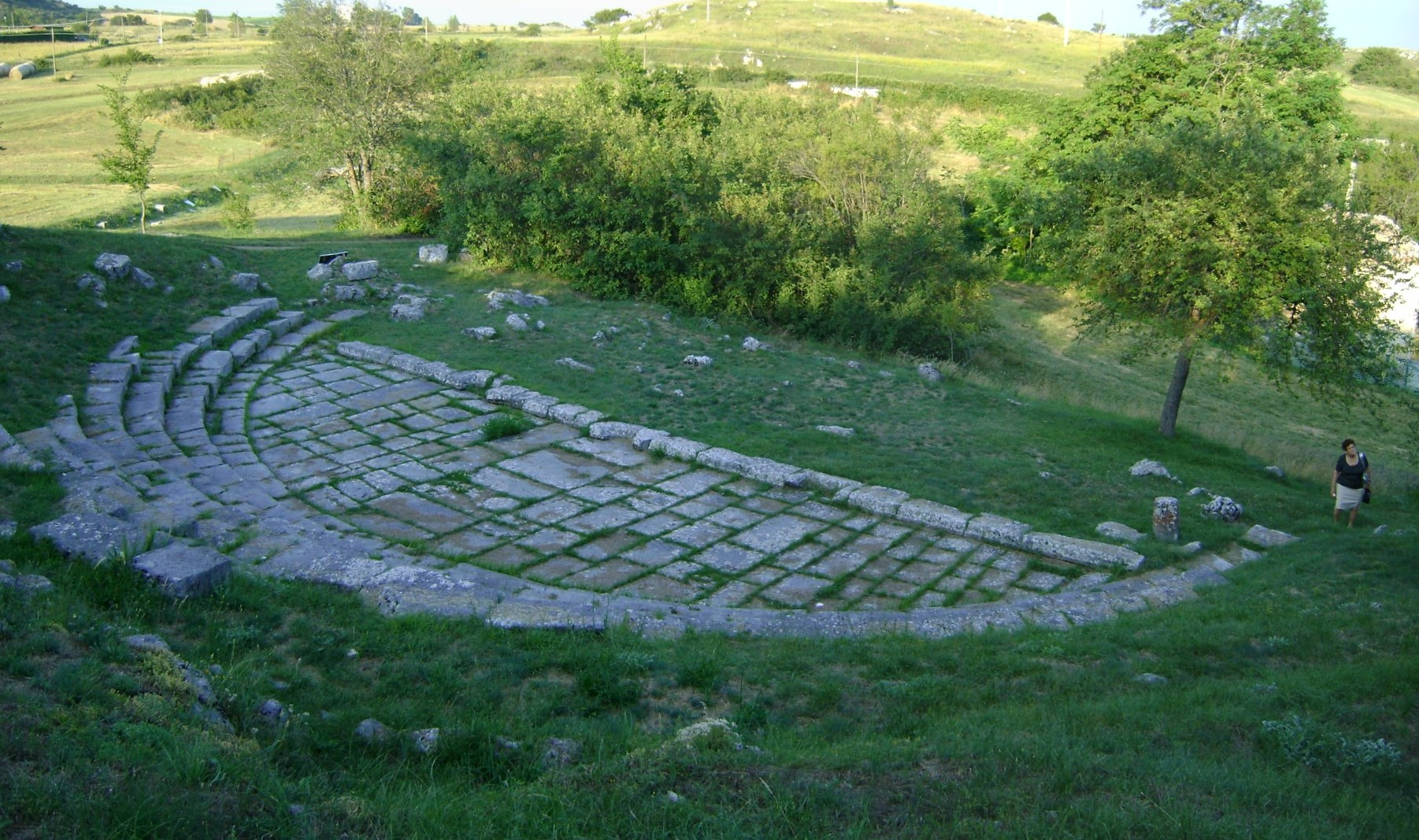
Roman theatre of Juvanum

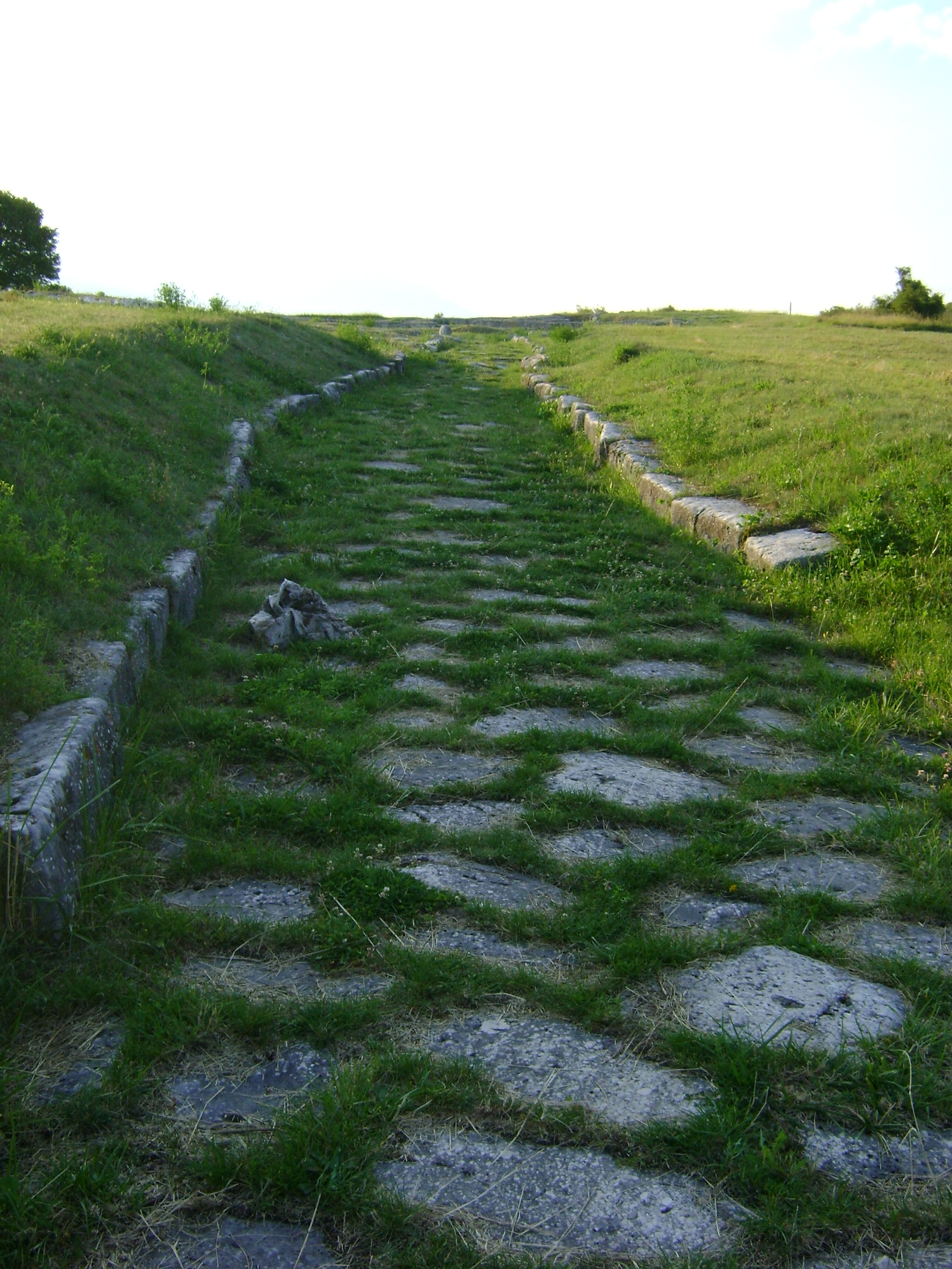
Decumanus
