= Montenerodomo =

- Comune
- Comune di Montenerodomo
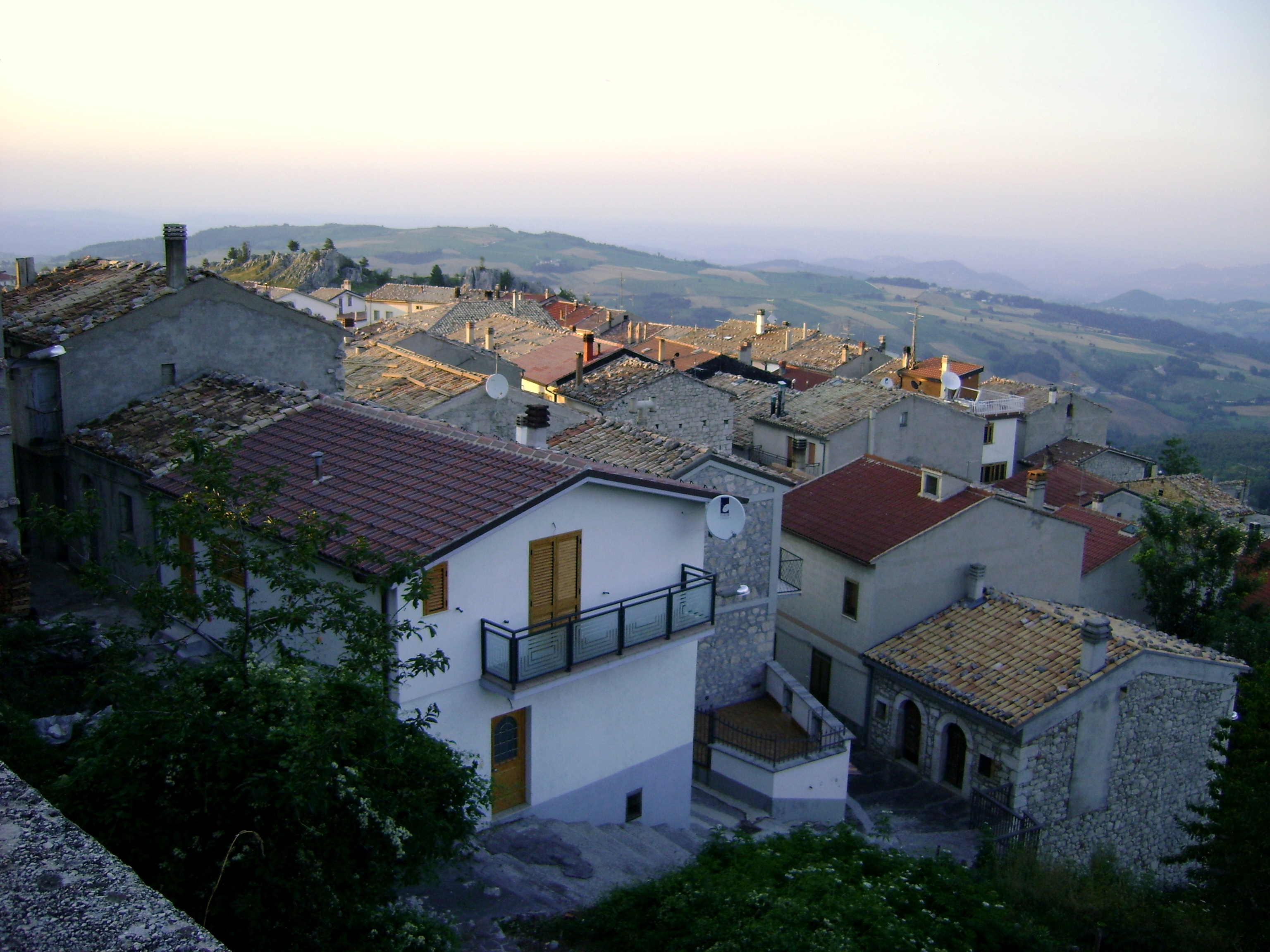
- View of Montenerodomo

- Location within Italy Location within Abruzzo
- Coordinates: 41°59′N 14°15′E
- Country: Italy
- Region: Abruzzo
- Province: Chieti (CH)
- Frazioni: Casale, Fonticelle, Marangola, Schiera, Selvoni, Verlinghiera

Government
  - Mayor: Antonio Tamburrino

Area
  - Total: 30 km^{2} (12 sq mi)
- Elevation: 1,165 m (3,822 ft)

Population (31 March 2017)
  - Total: 673
  - Density: 22/km^{2} (58/sq mi)
- Demonym: Monteneresi
- Time zone: UTC+1 (CET)
  - Summer (DST): UTC+2 (CEST)
- Postal code: 66010
- Dialing code: 0872
- Patron saint: San Fedele da Sigmaringa
- Website: Official website

Montenerodomo is a comune and town in the Province of Chieti in the Abruzzo region of Italy. The remote mountain hill town lies within the Maiella National Park.

Montenerodomo is the birthplace of Tommaso F. D'Alessandro, father of former Baltimore mayor Thomas D'Alesandro Jr., and grandfather of Nancy Pelosi, former Speaker of the United States House of Representatives.

== See also ==
- Juvanum
