= Robert Downey Jr. on screen and stage =

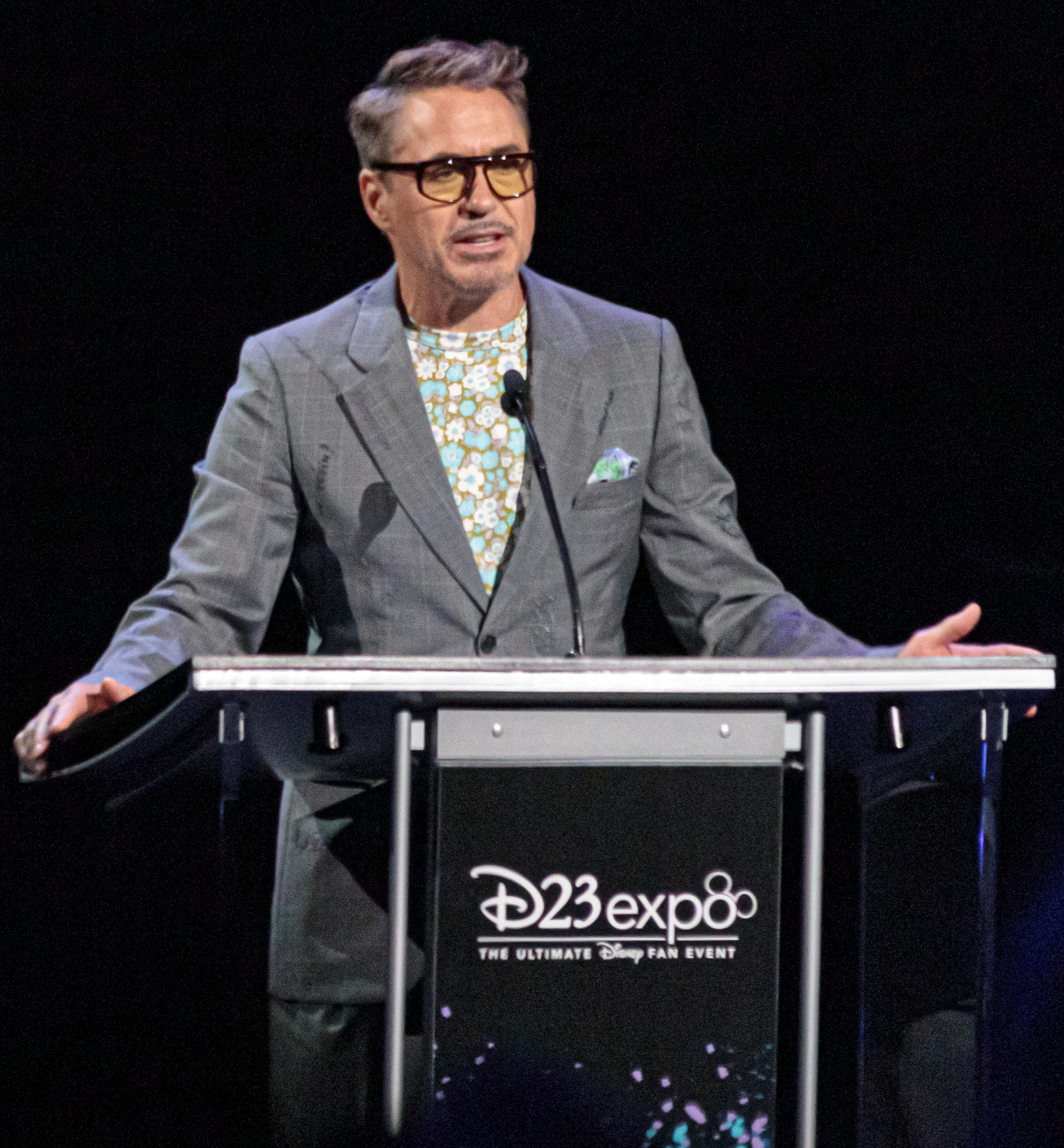
Downey speaking at the 2019 Disney Legends Awards

American actor Robert Downey Jr. made his acting debut in 1970's Pound, directed by his father Robert Downey Sr., at the age of five. In the 1980s, Downey was considered a member of the Brat Pack after appearing in the films Weird Science with Anthony Michael Hall (1985), Back to School with Rodney Dangerfield (1986), Less than Zero with Andrew McCarthy (1987), and Johnny Be Good again with Hall (1988). Downey also starred in the films True Believer (1989) and Chances Are (1989), and was a regular cast member on the late-night variety show Saturday Night Live in 1985.

In the 1990s, Downey was featured in the films Air America with Mel Gibson (1990), Soapdish with Sally Field (1991), Chaplin as Charlie Chaplin (1992), Heart and Souls with Alfre Woodard and Kyra Sedgwick (1993), Short Cuts with Julianne Moore (1993), Only You with Marisa Tomei (1994), Richard III with Ian McKellen (1995), and U.S. Marshals with Tommy Lee Jones (1998). His role in Chaplin earned him an Academy Award nomination for Best Actor and a BAFTA Award win for Best Actor in a Leading Role.

Downey had a regular role in the television series Ally McBeal in 2000, which won him a Golden Globe for Best Supporting Actor. He was then cast in the 2003 films The Singing Detective alongside Robin Wright and Gothika with Halle Berry. In 2005, he starred in Kiss Kiss Bang Bang with Val Kilmer; in Good Night, and Good Luck with David Strathairn and George Clooney; and voiced the character of Patrick Pewterschmidt in the animated series Family Guy. The following year, he appeared in the animated science fiction film A Scanner Darkly and as Paul Avery in the 2007 film Zodiac.

Downey was cast as the role of Tony Stark / Iron Man in the 2008 Marvel Studios film Iron Man. He reprised the role in Iron Man 2 (2010), The Avengers (2012), Iron Man 3, Avengers: Age of Ultron (2015), Captain America: Civil War (2016), Spider-Man: Homecoming (2017), Avengers: Infinity War (2018), and Avengers: Endgame (2019). He also starred in the films Tropic Thunder (2008) and The Soloist (2009), and played the title character in Sherlock Holmes (2009) and Sherlock Holmes: A Game of Shadows (2011). In 2020, he starred as the title character in Dolittle. For his role in Tropic Thunder, he was nominated for an Academy Award and a BAFTA for Best Supporting Actor. He also won a Golden Globe Award for Best Actor for his role in Sherlock Holmes. For his role as Lewis Strauss in Christopher Nolan's Oppenheimer (2023), Downey received a Golden Globe Award, BAFTA Award, Screen Actors Guild Award, and Academy Award for Best Supporting Actor.

Key
†	Denotes films that have not yet been released

== Film ==
Year	Title	Role	Notes	Ref.
1970	Pound	Puppy		
1972	Greaser's Palace	Small Boy in Covered Wagon	Uncredited	
1975	Two Tons of Turquoise to Taos Tonight	Himself	Uncredited	
1980	Up the Academy	Boy on Soccer Team	Uncredited	
1983	Baby It's You	Stewart		
1984	Firstborn	Lee		
1985	Tuff Turf	Jimmy Parker		
1985	Girls Just Want to Have Fun	Punk Party Crasher	Uncredited	
1985	Weird Science	Ian		
1985	Deadwait	—N/a	Short film	
1986	Back to School	Derek Lutz		
1987	The Pick-up Artist	Jack Jericho		
1987	Less than Zero	Julian Wells		
1988	Johnny Be Good	Leo Wiggins		
1988	Rented Lips	Wolf Dangler		
1988	1969	Ralph Karr		
1988	That's Adequate	Albert Einstein		
1989	True Believer	Roger Baron		
1989	Chances Are	Alex Finch / Louie Jefferies		
1990	Air America	Billy Covington		
1991	Too Much Sun	Reed Richmond		
1991	Soapdish	David Seton Barnes		
1992	Chaplin	Charlie Chaplin		
1993	Heart and Souls	Thomas Reilly		
1993	The Last Party	Himself	Documentary; also writer	
1993	Short Cuts	Bill Bush		
1994	Hail Caesar	Jerry		
1994	Natural Born Killers	Wayne Gale		
1994	Only You	Peter Wright		
1995	Home for the Holidays	Tommy Larson		
1995	Richard III	Earl Rivers		
1995	Restoration	Robert Merivel		
1996	Danger Zone	Jim Scott		
1997	One Night Stand	Charlie		
1997	Two Girls and a Guy	Blake Allen		
1997	Hugo Pool	Franz Mazur		
1998	The Gingerbread Man	Clyde Pell		
1998	U.S. Marshals	Special Agent John Royce		
1999	In Dreams	Vivian Thompson		
1999	Friends & Lovers	Hans		
1999	Bowfinger	Jerry Renfro		
1999	Black and White	Terry Donager		
2000	Wonder Boys	Terry Crabtree		
2002	Lethargy	Animal therapist	Short film	
2003	Whatever We Do	Bobby	Short film	
2003	The Singing Detective	Dan Dark		
2003	Charlie: The Life and Art of Charles Chaplin	Himself	Documentary	
2003	Gothika	Pete Graham		
2004	Eros	Nick Penrose	Segment: "Equilibrium"	
2005	Game 6	Steven Schwimmer		
2005	Kiss Kiss Bang Bang	Harry Lockhart		
2005	The Outsider	Himself	Documentary	
2005	Good Night, and Good Luck	Joseph Wershba		
2005	Hubert Selby Jr.: It/ll Be Better Tomorrow	Narrator	Documentary	
2006	A Guide to Recognizing Your Saints	Dito Montiel	Also co-producer	
2006	The Shaggy Dog	Dr. Kozak		
2006	A Scanner Darkly	James Barris		
2006	Fur	Lionel Sweeney		
2007	Zodiac	Paul Avery		
2007	Lucky You	Telephone Jack	Cameo	
2007	Charlie Bartlett	Principal Nathan Gardner		
2008	Iron Man	Tony Stark / Iron Man		
2008	The Incredible Hulk	Tony Stark / Iron Man	Uncredited cameo	
2008	Tropic Thunder	Kirk Lazarus		
2009	The Soloist	Steve Lopez		
2009	Sherlock Holmes	Sherlock Holmes		
2010	Iron Man 2	Tony Stark / Iron Man		
2010	Love & Distrust	Rob	Segment: "Auto Motives"	
2010	Due Date	Peter Highman		
2011	Sherlock Holmes: A Game of Shadows	Sherlock Holmes		
2012	The Avengers	Tony Stark / Iron Man		
2013	Iron Man 3	Tony Stark / Iron Man		
2014	The Judge	Hank Palmer	Also executive producer	
2014	Chef	Marvin	Cameo	
2015	Avengers: Age of Ultron	Tony Stark / Iron Man		
2016	Captain America: Civil War	Tony Stark / Iron Man		
2017	Spider-Man: Homecoming	Tony Stark / Iron Man		
2018	Avengers: Infinity War	Tony Stark / Iron Man		
2019	Avengers: Endgame	Tony Stark / Iron Man		
2020	Dolittle	Dr. John Dolittle	Also executive producer	
2022	"Sr."	Himself	Documentary; also producer	
2023	Oppenheimer	Lewis Strauss		
2025	The Fantastic Four: First Steps	Victor von Doom / Doctor Doom	Uncredited cameo	
2025	Play Dirty	—N/a	Executive producer	
2026	Avengers Endgame: Encore	Tony Stark / Iron Man; Victor von Doom / Doctor Doom	Extended version of Avengers: Endgame, uncredited as Doom	
2026	Avengers: Doomsday †	Victor von Doom / Doctor Doom	Post-production	
TBA	All-Star Weekend †	Mexican Stranger	Completed; Cameo	
TBA	A Head Full of Ghosts †	—N/a	Post-production; Producer	

== Television ==
Year	Title	Role	Notes	Ref.
1985–1986, 1996	Saturday Night Live	Various characters (1985–1986); Himself / host (1996)	17 episodes	
1985	Mussolini: The Untold Story	Bruno Mussolini	3 episodes	
1995	Mr. Willowby's Christmas Tree	Mr. Willowby	Television special	
2000–2002	Ally McBeal	Larry Paul	21 episodes	
2005	Family Guy	Patrick Pewterschmidt (voice)	Episode: "The Fat Guy Strangler"	
2008	American Idol	Himself	Episode: "American Idol Season 7 Finale"	
2019	Constance	—N/a	Executive producer	
2019	The Age of A.I.	Himself (host)	8 episodes; also co-executive producer	
2020	The Ellen DeGeneres Show	Himself (guest host)	Episode: "Season 17, Episode 82"	
2020–2023	Perry Mason	—N/a	Executive producer	
2021–2024	Sweet Tooth	—N/a	Executive producer	
2022	The Bond	—N/a	Executive producer	
2022	The Sunshine Place	—N/a	Executive producer	
2023	Downey's Dream Cars	Himself (host)	6 episodes; also executive producer	
2024	The Sympathizer	Claude, Niko Damianos, Professor Robert Hammer, Ned Godwin, The Priest	7 episodes; also executive producer	
2026	VisionQuest	Victor von Doom / Doctor Doom	Mid-credits cameo appearance; episode: "Forever" (uncredited)	

== Theater ==
Year	Title	Role	Playwright	Venue	Ref.
1983	American Passion	Jackson	Fred Burch	Joyce Theatre, Off-Broadway	
2017	Our Town	The Stage Manager	Thornton Wilder	Fox Theatre	
2024	McNeal	Jacob McNeal	Ayad Akhtar	Vivian Beaumont Theatre, Broadway	

== Video game ==
Year	Title	Voice role	Notes	Ref.
2008	Iron Man	Tony Stark	Iron Man was voiced by Stephen Stanton	

== Music ==
Year	Title	Artist	Ref.
2000	"River"	Himself	
2001	"I Want Love"	Elton John	
2004	"The Futurist"	Himself	
