= List of awards and nominations received by Robert Downey Jr. =

Robert Downey Jr. awards and nominations
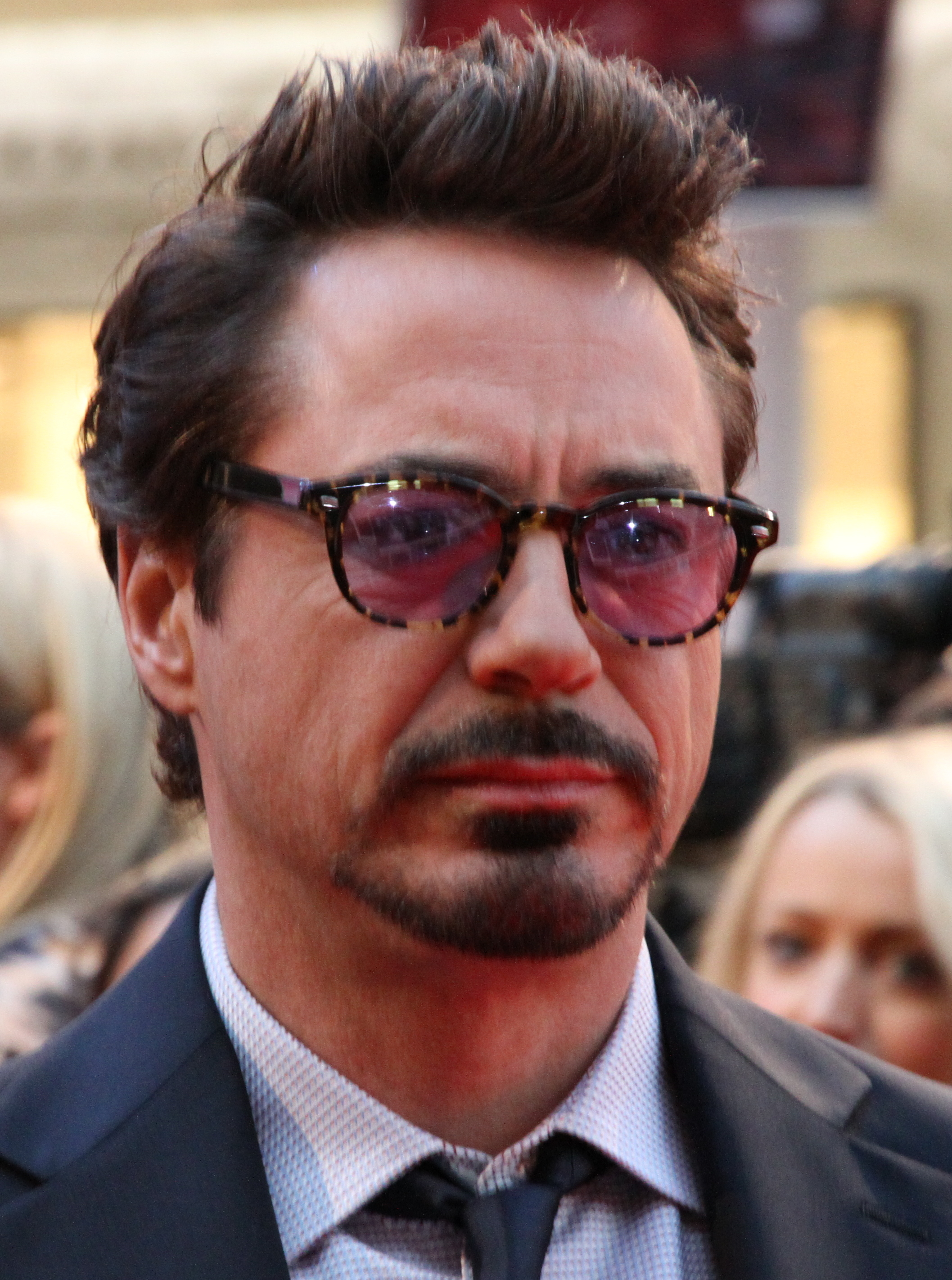
- Downey in 2012
Awards and nominations
Award	Wins	Nominations
Academy Awards	1	3
BAFTA Awards	2	3
Critics' Choice	2	5
Emmy Awards	1	4
Golden Globe Awards	4	6
Screen Actors Guild Awards	3	6

Totals (Note: Certain award groups do not simply award one winner. They acknowledge several different recipients, have runners-up, and have third place. Since this is a specific recognition and is different from losing an award, runner-up mentions are considered wins in this award tally. For simplification and to avoid errors, each award in this list has been presumed to have had a prior nomination.)
- Wins: 70
- Nominations: 162

Robert Downey Jr. is an American actor and producer. Throughout his career, he has received numerous accolades including an Academy Award, two BAFTA Awards, two Critics' Choice Movie Awards, a Daytime Emmy Award, three Golden Globe Awards, and three Screen Actors Guild Awards. He has also received two nominations for a Primetime Emmy Award.

For his role as Charlie Chaplin in the Richard Attenborough-directed biographical epic Chaplin (1991) he received the BAFTA Award for Best Actor in a Leading Role as well as nominations for the Academy Award for Best Actor and the Golden Globe Award for Best Actor - Motion Picture Drama. For his comedic role in Ben Stiller's satirical war comedy Tropic Thunder (2008) he received his second Academy Award nomination, this time for the Best Supporting Actor as well as nominations for the BAFTA Award for Best Supporting Actor and the Golden Globe Award for Best Supporting Actor.

Downey Jr. portrayed Larry Paul in the Fox legal drama Ally McBeal from 2000 to 2002. For his performance he earned the Golden Globe Award for Best Supporting Actor – Series, Miniseries or Television Film and the Screen Actors Guild Award for Outstanding Performance by a Male Actor in a Comedy Series as well as a nomination for the Primetime Emmy Award for Outstanding Supporting Actor in a Comedy Series.

For his role as Lewis Strauss in the Christopher Nolan-directed epic biographical film Oppenheimer (2023), Downey received the Golden Globe Award for Best Supporting Actor – Motion Picture, the BAFTA Award for Best Actor in a Supporting Role and the Screen Actors Guild Award for Outstanding Performance by a Male Actor in a Supporting Role as well as the Academy Award for Best Supporting Actor.

== Awards and nominations ==
=== Academy Awards ===
Year	Category	Nominated work	Result	Ref.
1993	Best Actor	Chaplin	Nominated	
2009	Best Supporting Actor	Tropic Thunder	Nominated	
2024	Best Supporting Actor	Oppenheimer	Won	

=== BAFTA Awards ===
Year	Category	Nominated work	Result	Ref.
British Academy Film Awards
1993	Best Actor in a Leading Role	Chaplin	Won	
2009	Best Actor in a Supporting Role	Tropic Thunder	Nominated	
2024	Best Actor in a Supporting Role	Oppenheimer	Won	

=== Critics' Choice Awards ===
Year	Category	Nominated work	Result	Ref.
Critics' Choice Movie Awards
2009	Best Supporting Actor	Tropic Thunder	Nominated	
2013	Best Actor in an Action Movie	The Avengers	Nominated	
2014	Best Actor in an Action Movie	Iron Man 3	Nominated	
2024	Best Acting Ensemble (Note: Shared with the cast.)	Oppenheimer	Won	
2024	Best Supporting Actor	Oppenheimer	Won	
Critics' Choice Television Awards
2025	Best Supporting Actor in a Movie/Miniseries	The Sympathizer	Nominated	

=== Emmy Awards ===
Year	Category	Nominated work	Result	Ref.
Primetime Emmy Awards
2001	Outstanding Supporting Actor in a Comedy Series	Ally McBeal	Nominated	
2024	Outstanding Supporting Actor in a Limited Series or Movie	The Sympathizer	Nominated	
Daytime Emmy Awards
2024	Outstanding Lifestyle Program	Downey's Dream Cars	Won	
Children's and Family Emmy Awards
2026	Outstanding Young Teen Series	Sweet Tooth	Nominated	

=== Golden Globe Awards ===
Year	Category	Nominated work	Result	Ref.
1993	Best Actor – Motion Picture Drama	Chaplin	Nominated	
1994	Special Achievement Award for Ensemble	Short Cuts	Won	
2001	Best Supporting Actor – Series, Miniseries or Television Film	Ally McBeal	Won	
2009	Best Supporting Actor – Motion Picture	Tropic Thunder	Nominated	
2010	Best Actor in a Motion Picture – Musical or Comedy	Sherlock Holmes	Won	
2024	Best Supporting Actor – Motion Picture	Oppenheimer	Won	

=== Screen Actors Guild Awards ===
Year	Category	Nominated work	Result	Ref.
2001	Outstanding Male Actor in a Comedy Series	Ally McBeal	Won	
2001	Outstanding Ensemble in a Comedy Series	Ally McBeal	Nominated	
2006	Outstanding Cast in a Motion Picture	Good Night, and Good Luck	Nominated	
2009	Outstanding Male Actor in a Supporting Role	Tropic Thunder	Nominated	
2024	Outstanding Male Actor in a Supporting Role	Oppenheimer	Won	
2024	Outstanding Cast in a Motion Picture	Oppenheimer	Won	

== Miscellaneous awards ==
Organizations	Year	Category	Nominated work	Result	Ref.
AACTA International Awards	2024	Best Supporting Actor	Oppenheimer	Nominated	
Astra Awards	2024	Best Cast Ensemble	Oppenheimer	Nominated	
Astra Awards	2024	Best Supporting Actor	Oppenheimer	Nominated	
Britannia Awards	2014	Excellence in Film	Robert Downey Jr.	Won	
Capri Hollywood International Film Festival	2023	Best Ensemble Cast	Oppenheimer	Won	
Chicago International Film Festival	2003	Career Achievement Award	Robert Downey Jr.	Won	
Empire Awards	2009	Best Actor	Iron Man	Nominated	
Empire Awards	2010	Best Actor	Sherlock Holmes	Nominated	
Empire Awards	2013	Best Actor	The Avengers	Nominated	
Golden Raspberry Awards	2021	Worst Actor	Dolittle	Nominated	
Golden Raspberry Awards	2021	Worst Screen Combo	Dolittle	Nominated	
Gotham Awards	2005	Best Ensemble Cast	Good Night, and Good Luck	Nominated	
Hasty Pudding Theatricals	2004	Man of the Year	Robert Downey Jr.	Won	
International Cinephile Society	2007	Best Supporting Actor	A Scanner Darkly	Runner-up	
Irish Film & Television Awards	2009	Best International Actor	Iron Man	Won	
Irish Film & Television Awards	2010	Best International Actor	Sherlock Holmes	Won	
MTV Movie & TV Awards	2009	Best Male Performance	Iron Man	Nominated	
MTV Movie & TV Awards	2010	Best Fight (Note: Shared with Mark Strong.)	Sherlock Holmes	Nominated	
MTV Movie & TV Awards	2011	Biggest Badass Star	Iron Man 2	Nominated	
MTV Movie & TV Awards	2013	Best Fight	The Avengers	Won	
MTV Movie & TV Awards	2013	Best Hero	The Avengers	Nominated	
MTV Movie & TV Awards	2013	Best On-Screen Duo (Note: Shared with Mark Ruffalo.)	The Avengers	Nominated	
MTV Movie & TV Awards	2015	Generation Award	Robert Downey Jr.	Won	
MTV Movie & TV Awards	2016	Best Fight	Avengers: Age of Ultron	Nominated	
MTV Movie & TV Awards	2019	Best Hero	Avengers: Endgame	Won	
National Movie Awards	2008	Best Male Performance	Iron Man	Nominated	
Nickelodeon Kids' Choice Awards	2011	Favorite Buttkicker	Iron Man 2	Nominated	
Nickelodeon Kids' Choice Awards	2013	Favorite Male Buttkicker	The Avengers	Nominated	
Nickelodeon Kids' Choice Awards	2014	Favorite Male Buttkicker	Iron Man 3	Won	
Nickelodeon Kids' Choice Awards	2014	Favorite Movie Actor	Iron Man 3	Nominated	
Nickelodeon Kids' Choice Awards	2016	Favorite Movie Actor	Avengers: Age of Ultron	Nominated	
Nickelodeon Kids' Choice Awards	2017	Favorite Frenemies (Note: Shared with Chris Evans.)	Captain America: Civil War	Nominated	
Nickelodeon Kids' Choice Awards	2017	Favorite Movie Actor	Captain America: Civil War	Nominated	
Nickelodeon Kids' Choice Awards	2017	#Squad	Captain America: Civil War	Nominated	
Nickelodeon Kids' Choice Awards	2019	Favorite Superhero	Avengers: Infinity War	Won	
Nickelodeon Kids' Choice Awards	2020	Favorite Superhero	Avengers: Endgame	Nominated	
Nickelodeon Kids' Choice Awards	2021	Favorite Movie Actor	Dolittle	Won	
Outfest LA	2001	Screen Idol Award	Wonder Boys	Won	
People's Choice Awards	2009	Favorite Male Action Star	Iron Man	Nominated	
People's Choice Awards	2009	Favorite Male Movie Star	Iron Man	Nominated	
People's Choice Awards	2009	Favorite Superhero	Iron Man	Nominated	
People's Choice Awards	2011	Favorite Action Star	Iron Man 2	Nominated	
People's Choice Awards	2011	Favorite Actor	Iron Man 2	Nominated	
People's Choice Awards	2011	Favorite On-Screen Team (Note: Shared with Don Cheadle.)	Iron Man 2	Nominated	
People's Choice Awards	2013	Favorite Movie Actor	The Avengers	Won	
People's Choice Awards	2013	Favorite Movie Superhero	The Avengers	Won	
People's Choice Awards	2013	Favorite Action Movie Star	The Avengers	Nominated	
People's Choice Awards	2014	Favorite Action Movie Actor	Iron Man 3	Won	
People's Choice Awards	2014	Favorite Movie Actor	Iron Man 3	Nominated	
People's Choice Awards	2014	Favorite Movie Duo (Note: Shared with Gwyneth Paltrow.)	Iron Man 3	Nominated	
People's Choice Awards	2015	Favorite Dramatic Movie Actor	The Judge	Won	
People's Choice Awards	2015	Favorite Movie Actor	The Judge	Won	
People's Choice Awards	2016	Favorite Action Movie Actor	Avengers: Age of Ultron	Nominated	
People's Choice Awards	2016	Favorite Movie Actor	Avengers: Age of Ultron	Nominated	
People's Choice Awards	2017	Favorite Action Movie Actor	Captain America: Civil War	Won	
People's Choice Awards	2017	Favorite Movie Actor	Captain America: Civil War	Nominated	
People's Choice Awards	2020	The Male Movie Star of 2020	Dolittle	Nominated	
Prism Awards	2010	Performance in a Feature Film	The Soloist	Nominated	
Santa Barbara International Film Festival	2024	Maltin Modern Master Award	Robert Downey Jr.	Won	
Satellite Awards	2004	Best Actor – Motion Picture Musical or Comedy	The Singing Detective	Nominated	
Satellite Awards	2005	Best Actor – Motion Picture Musical or Comedy	Kiss Kiss Bang Bang	Nominated	
Satellite Awards	2005	Best Original Song (Note: Shared with Mark Hudson.)	"Broken" (from Kiss Kiss Bang Bang)	Nominated	
Satellite Awards	2008	Best Supporting Actor – Motion Picture	Tropic Thunder	Nominated	
Satellite Awards	2024	Best Cast – Motion Picture	Oppenheimer	Won	
Satellite Awards	2024	Best Supporting Actor – Motion Picture	Oppenheimer	Nominated	
Saturn Awards	1994	Best Actor	Heart and Souls	Won	
Saturn Awards	2006	Best Actor	Kiss Kiss Bang Bang	Nominated	
Saturn Awards	2009	Best Actor	Iron Man	Won	
Saturn Awards	2010	Best Actor	Sherlock Holmes	Nominated	
Saturn Awards	2011	Best Actor	Iron Man 2	Nominated	
Saturn Awards	2014	Best Actor	Iron Man 3	Won	
Saturn Awards	2019	Best Actor	Avengers: Endgame	Won	
Saturn Awards	2024	Best Supporting Actor	Oppenheimer	Nominated	
ShoWest Convention	2008	Career Achievement Award	Robert Downey Jr.	Won	
Sitges Film Festival	2003	Best Actor	The Singing Detective	Won	
Sundance Film Festival	2006	Special Jury Prize	A Guide to Recognizing Your Saints	Won	
Teen Choice Awards	2008	Choice Movie Actor: Action/Adventure	Iron Man	Nominated	
Teen Choice Awards	2009	Choice Movie: Hissy Fit	Tropic Thunder	Nominated	
Teen Choice Awards	2010	Choice Movie Actor: Action/Adventure	Sherlock Holmes	Nominated	
Teen Choice Awards	2010	Choice Movie Actor: Sci-Fi	Iron Man 2	Nominated	
Teen Choice Awards	2010	Choice Movie: Dance	Iron Man 2	Nominated	
Teen Choice Awards	2010	Choice Movie: Fight	Iron Man 2	Nominated	
Teen Choice Awards	2011	Choice Movie: Hissy Fit	Due Date	Nominated	
Teen Choice Awards	2012	Choice Movie Actor: Action	Sherlock Holmes: A Game of Shadows	Nominated	
Teen Choice Awards	2012	Choice Movie Actor: Sci-Fi/Fantasy	The Avengers	Nominated	
Teen Choice Awards	2012	Choice Summer Movie Star: Male	The Avengers	Nominated	
Teen Choice Awards	2013	Choice Movie Actor: Action	Iron Man 3	Won	
Teen Choice Awards	2013	Choice Movie Actor: Sci-Fi/Fantasy	Iron Man 3	Nominated	
Teen Choice Awards	2013	Choice Movie: Chemistry	Iron Man 3	Nominated	
Teen Choice Awards	2015	Choice Movie Actor: Sci-Fi/Fantasy	Avengers: Age of Ultron	Nominated	
Teen Choice Awards	2016	Choice Movie Actor: Sci-Fi/Fantasy	Captain America: Civil War	Nominated	
Teen Choice Awards	2016	Choice Movie: Chemistry (Note: Shared with Paul Bettany, Chadwick Boseman, Don Cheadle, and Scarlett Johansson.)	Captain America: Civil War	Nominated	
Teen Choice Awards	2018	Choice Action Movie Actor	Avengers: Infinity War	Won	
Teen Choice Awards	2019	Choice Action Movie Actor	Avengers: Endgame	Won	
TV Guide Awards	2001	Best Supporting Actor	Ally McBeal	Nominated	
Venice International Film Festival	1993	Special Volpi Cup	Short Cuts	Won	

== Critics awards ==
Organizations	Year	Category	Nominated work	Result	Ref.
Alliance of Women Film Journalists	2008	Best Actor in a Supporting Role	Tropic Thunder	Nominated	
Alliance of Women Film Journalists	2023	Best Actor in a Supporting Role	Oppenheimer	Nominated	
Atlanta Film Critics Circle	2023	Best Ensemble Cast	Oppenheimer	Won	
Atlanta Film Critics Circle	2023	Best Supporting Actor (Note: Tied with Ryan Gosling.)	Oppenheimer	Won	
Austin Film Critics Association	2024	Best Ensemble	Oppenheimer	Won	
Austin Film Critics Association	2024	Best Supporting Actor	Oppenheimer	Won	
Boston Society of Film Critics	1997	Best Supporting Actor	One Night Stand	Runner-up	
Boston Society of Film Critics	2008	Best Cast	Tropic Thunder	Won	
Boston Society of Film Critics	2008	Best Supporting Actor	Tropic Thunder	Runner-up	
Boston Society of Film Critics	2023	Best Cast	Oppenheimer	Won	
Boston Society of Film Critics	2023	Best Supporting Actor	Oppenheimer	Runner-up	
Chicago Film Critics Association	1993	Best Actor	Chaplin	Nominated	
Chicago Film Critics Association	2008	Best Supporting Actor	Tropic Thunder	Nominated	
Chicago Film Critics Association	2023	Best Supporting Actor	Oppenheimer	Nominated	
Dallas–Fort Worth Film Critics Association	2008	Best Supporting Actor	Tropic Thunder	Nominated	
Dallas–Fort Worth Film Critics Association	2023	Best Supporting Actor	Oppenheimer	Won	
Detroit Film Critics Society	2008	Best Supporting Actor	Tropic Thunder	Nominated	
Florida Film Critics Circle	2023	Best Supporting Actor	Oppenheimer	Runner-up	
Florida Film Critics Circle	2023	Best Ensemble	Oppenheimer	Nominated	
Indiana Film Journalists Association	2019	Best Actor	Avengers: Endgame	Nominated	
Indiana Film Journalists Association	2023	Best Ensemble Acting	Oppenheimer	Runner-up	
Indiana Film Journalists Association	2023	Best Supporting Actor	Oppenheimer	Runner-up	
London Film Critics' Circle	1993	Actor of the Year	Chaplin	Won	
London Film Critics' Circle	2024	Supporting Actor of the Year	Oppenheimer	Nominated	
Online Film Critics Society	2009	Best Supporting Actor	Tropic Thunder	Nominated	
National Society of Film Critics	2024	Best Supporting Actor	Oppenheimer	Runner-up	
New York Film Critics Circle	2009	Best Supporting Actor	Tropic Thunder	Nominated	
San Diego Film Critics Society	2023	Best Supporting Actor	Oppenheimer	Won	
San Diego Film Critics Society	2023	Best Performance by an Ensemble	Oppenheimer	Nominated	
San Francisco Bay Area Film Critics Circle	2024	Best Supporting Actor	Oppenheimer	Won	
Southeastern Film Critics Association	2008	Best Supporting Actor	Tropic Thunder	Runner-up	
Southeastern Film Critics Association	2023	Best Ensemble	Oppenheimer	Won	
Southeastern Film Critics Association	2023	Best Supporting Actor	Oppenheimer	Won	
St. Louis Film Critics Association	2023	Best Ensemble	Oppenheimer	Nominated	
St. Louis Film Critics Association	2023	Best Supporting Actor	Oppenheimer	Runner-up	
Television Critics Association Awards	2001	Individual Achievement in Comedy	Ally McBeal	Nominated	
Toronto Film Critics Association	2008	Best Supporting Actor	Tropic Thunder	Runner-up	
Toronto Film Critics Association	2023	Best Supporting Actor	Oppenheimer	Runner-up	
Vancouver Film Critics Circle	2024	Best Supporting Actor	Oppenheimer	Won	
Washington D.C. Area Film Critics Association	2023	Best Acting Ensemble	Oppenheimer	Won	
Washington D.C. Area Film Critics Association	2023	Best Supporting Actor	Oppenheimer	Nominated	
