= Susan Downey =

American film producer (born 1973)

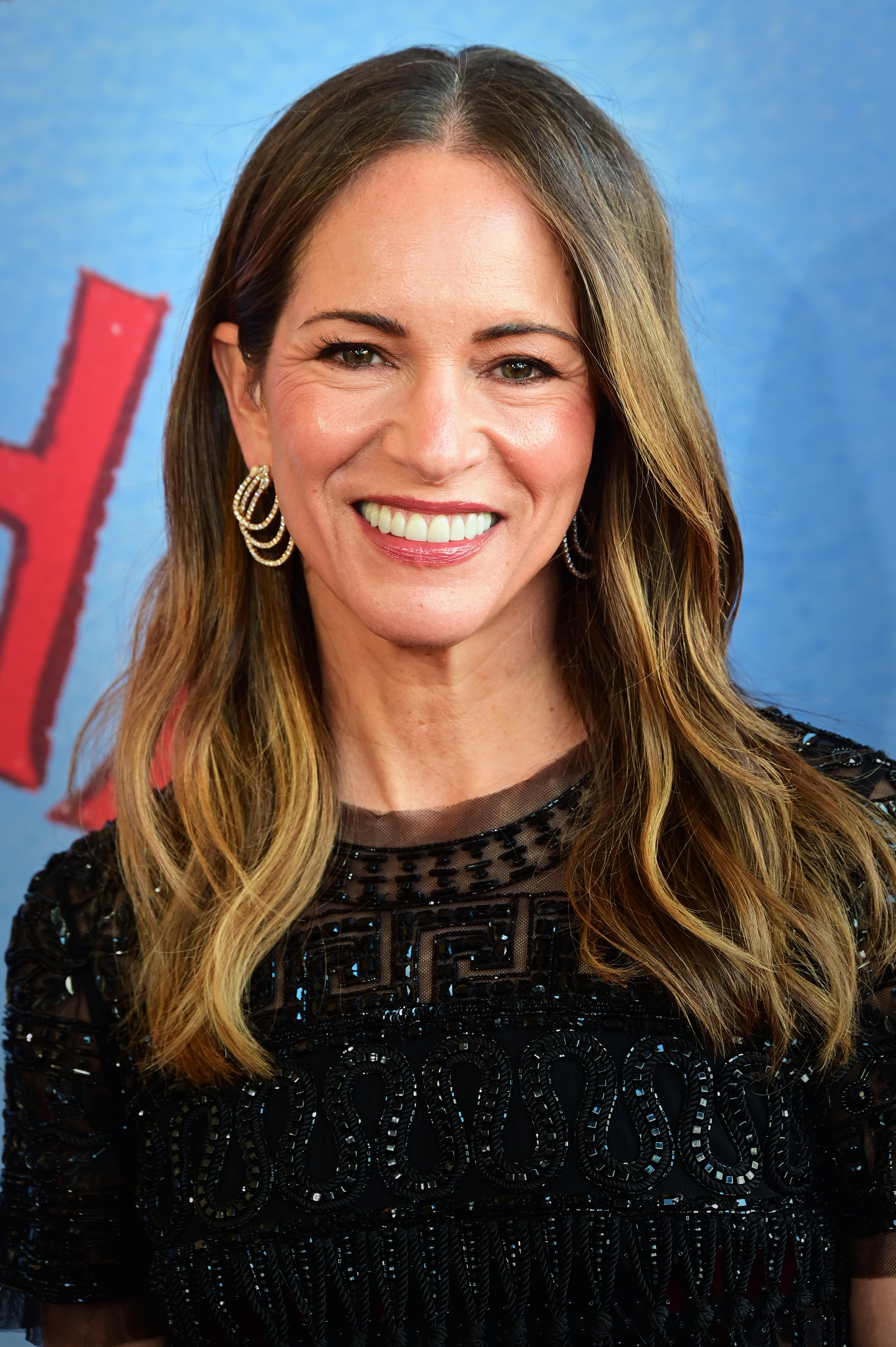
- Downey in 2026
- Born: Susan Nicole Levin; November 6, 1973 (age 53); Schaumburg, Illinois, U.S.
- Education: University of Southern California
- Occupation: Producer
- Years active: 1995–present
- Title: President (executive), Team Downey
- Spouse: Robert Downey Jr. (m. 2005)
- Children: 2

Susan Nicole Downey (née Levin; born November 6, 1973) is an American film producer. Until February 2009, she was co-president of Dark Castle Entertainment and executive vice president of production at Silver Pictures, Joel Silver's production company. Susan is married to Robert Downey Jr. The couple has formed their own production house named Team Downey.

== Early life ==
Levin was born in Schaumburg, Illinois, to Rosie Levin, a homemaker, and Elliott Levin, a businessman. She became interested in the movie business at age 12. She graduated from Schaumburg High School as class valedictorian in 1991. She is Jewish.

Interested in pursuing a career in film production, Levin moved to California and graduated summa cum laude from the University of Southern California School of Cinematic Arts. She began her career at Threshold Entertainment, where she oversaw the development and production of projects based on well-known properties for both the company's film and television slates. These include the feature films Mortal Kombat and Mortal Kombat Annihilation, as well as the 22-episode TV series Mortal Kombat: Conquest which ran on both TNT and in syndication.

== Career ==
=== Silver Pictures ===
Downey held the dual posts of co-president of Dark Castle Entertainment and executive vice president of production at Silver Pictures. Joining Silver Pictures in 1999, she oversaw the development and production of feature films released under both banners, including Thirteen Ghosts and Swordfish.

In 2002, she made her producing debut as a co-producer on Ghost Ship and then co-produced the 2003 release Cradle 2 the Grave. Downey went on to produce the features Gothika and House of Wax, and also served as an executive producer on the critically acclaimed comedic thriller Kiss Kiss Bang Bang.

Downey later produced Neil Jordan's psychological drama The Brave One, starring Jodie Foster and Terrence Howard; Guy Ritchie's comedy RocknRolla, starring Gerard Butler, Tom Wilkinson, Thandiwe Newton, Idris Elba, Chris Bridges and Jeremy Piven; the horror thriller Orphan, starring Vera Farmiga and Peter Sarsgaard; and the thriller Whiteout, starring Kate Beckinsale.

She was also an executive producer on the Hughes brothers' post-apocalyptic drama The Book of Eli, starring Denzel Washington and Gary Oldman.

=== Sherlock Holmes ===
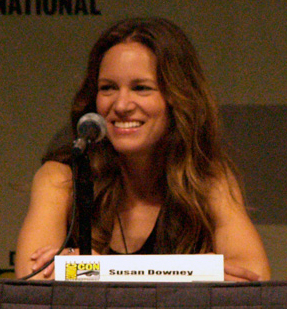
Downey at the 2009 San Diego Comic-Con

Downey was working on production for Guy Ritchie's crime film RocknRolla, during which her husband Robert Downey Jr., visited her office at Silver Pictures and learned about Ritchie's plans for a new Sherlock Holmes film; at her husband's request, Susan set up a meeting with Ritchie, and soon the film had Robert Downey Jr. as its lead. The film became the first time since 2005's Kiss Kiss Bang Bang that the Downeys had worked together, and according to Robert Downey Jr., the couple enjoyed it very much because they did not have to "miss each other" during the long production.

Sherlock Holmes opened to good reviews and record-breaking box office over the Christmas holiday in 2009. It was the couple's most financially successful joint venture to date, and netted Robert Downey Jr. his third Golden Globe Award, his first for Best Actor – Motion Picture Musical or Comedy. In his satirical, self-deprecating acceptance speech, he started off by thanking his wife: "First of all, I would like to thank Susan Downey for telling me that Matt Damon was going to win, 'so don't bother to prepare a speech.' That was at about 10AM." He continued his speech by noting all the people he supposedly wasn't going to thank (indirectly thanking them for giving him a chance to be in the movie) and again singled out his wife for tribute: "I mean, I really don't want to thank my wife, because I could be bussing tables at the Daily Grill right now if not for her."

=== Post-Silver Pictures ===
Susan worked with the production staff of Iron Man 2, Due Date and Sherlock Holmes: A Game of Shadows alongside her husband, allowing the couple to work together again after the first Sherlock Holmes completed production.

=== Team Downey ===
In June 2010, Robert and Susan Downey announced the formation of their Warner Bros.-based production company Team Downey, and hired David Gambino to be president of production. Their first producing project is Yucatan, a heist film originally crafted by Steve McQueen as a star vehicle for himself.

Columbia Pictures announced on October 20 it had obtained the rights to Neil Strauss' non-fiction 2009 bestseller Emergency! This Book Will Save Your Life. The book is to be developed into a feature produced by Team Downey.

The Downeys are also developing a musical project for Warner Bros. from a pitch by "Next to Normal" composers Brian Yorkey and Tom Kitt.

Team Downey produced the family drama The Judge (2014), starring Downey Jr.

In 2011, Team Downey announced plans to produce the tragic, shark-infested tale of the USS Indianapolis and the exoneration of her captain (decades later) due to the efforts of schoolboy Hunter Scott.

== Personal life ==
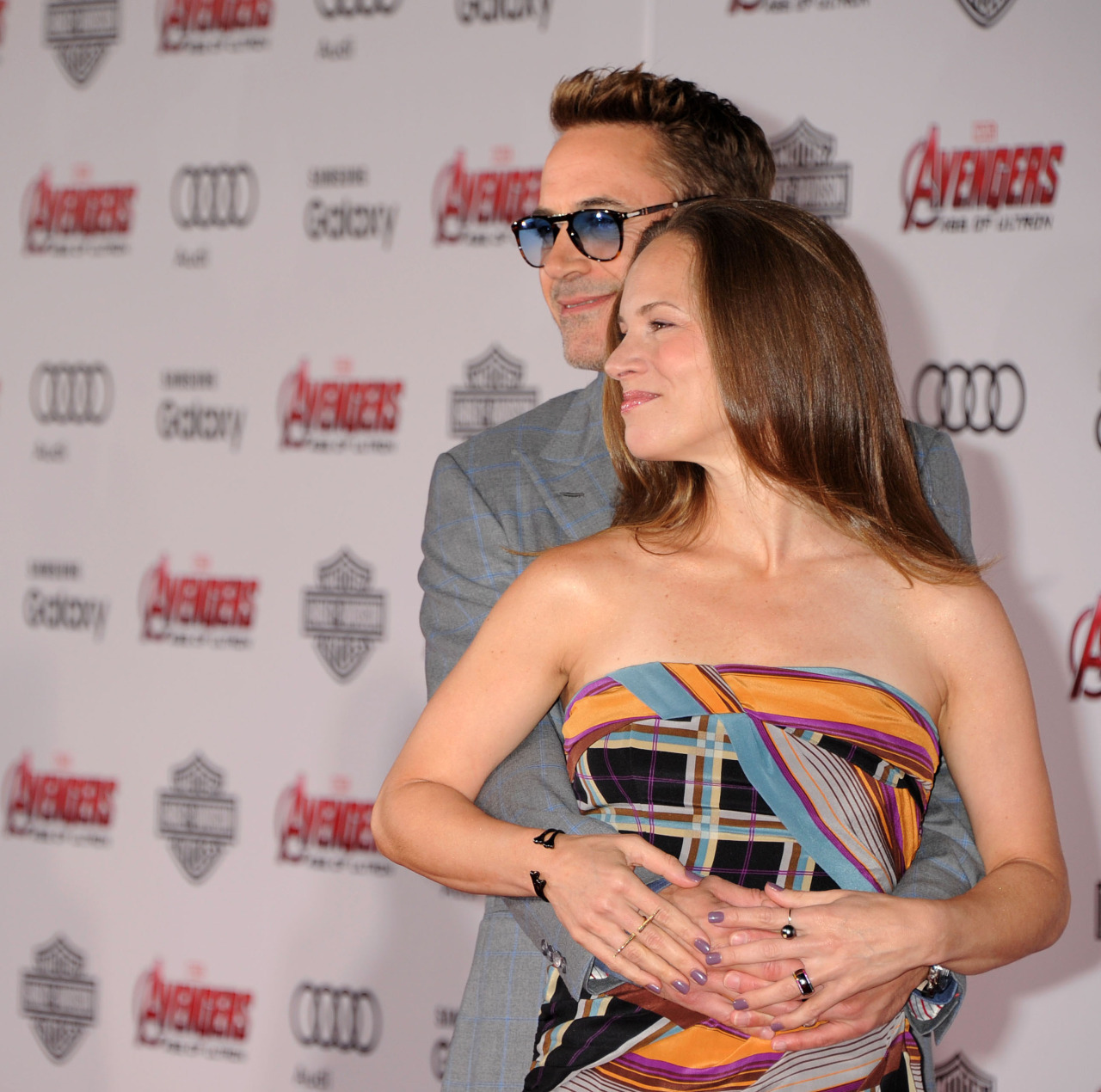
Levin with her husband Robert Downey Jr. at the Avengers: Age of Ultron world premiere

Susan Levin's first full-credit producer job was for the 2003 thriller Gothika, starring Halle Berry and Levin's future husband, actor Robert Downey Jr. Downey – who was in the process of divorcing his first wife, Deborah Falconer — has said that his most memorable recollection about shooting Gothika was "romancing the producer"; Levin stated to James Lipton on Inside the Actors Studio that while she thought Downey was "an amazing actor that we were lucky to have in our movie", her first impression of him was that he was "weird." The two quietly struck up a romance – though she turned down his romantic advances twice for fear that their relationship would not last through the completion of shooting because "he's an actor; I have a real job." The couple eventually made their relationship public in the fall of 2003.

Downey proposed to Levin on November 5, 2003, the night before her 30th birthday. They were married on August 27, 2005, in a Jewish ceremony at Amagansett, New York. She gave birth to their son, Exton Elias Downey, on February 7, 2012, in Los Angeles, California. On July 9, 2014, Downey Jr. announced via his Facebook and Twitter that he and his wife were expecting a daughter in November. Their daughter, Avri Roel, was born on November 4, 2014.

Downey credits his wife with helping him with his former drug and alcohol habits, which he quit in 2003, and revitalising his career. "The old saying is true – behind every good man there's an incredible woman. I owe a huge amount – if not all – of my success to Susan. We make a great team, and all that luck I spoke about, that's Susan." Sherlock Holmes director Guy Ritchie describes the couple as "the greatest illustration of a symbiotic marriage that I've ever seen. It's a real yin and yang, and it's made him a joy to work with. Robert would be a pain in the ass if he didn't have Susan to police him." One of Downey's biceps bears a tattoo which reads "Suzie Q" as a tribute to her.

== Filmography ==
=== Producer ===
Year	Title	Role	Notes
2002	Ghost Ship	Co-producer	Credited as Susan Levin
2003	Cradle 2 the Grave	Co-producer	Credited as Susan Levin
2003	Gothika	Producer	Credited as Susan Levin
2005	House of Wax	Producer	Credited as Susan Levin
2005	Kiss Kiss Bang Bang	Executive producer	Credited as Susan Levin
2007	The Reaping	Producer	
2007	The Invasion	Executive producer	
2007	The Brave One	Producer	
2008	RocknRolla	Producer	
2009	Orphan	Producer	
2009	Whiteout	Producer	
2009	Sherlock Holmes	Producer	
2010	The Book of Eli	Executive producer	
2010	Due Date	Executive producer	
2010	Iron Man 2	Executive producer	
2011	Unknown	Executive producer	
2011	Sherlock Holmes: A Game of Shadows	Producer	
2012	The Factory	Producer	
2014	The Judge	Producer	
2020	Dolittle	Producer	
2020–2023	Perry Mason	Executive producer	
2021–2024	Sweet Tooth	Executive producer	
2022	The Bond	Executive producer	
2022	The Sunshine Place	Executive producer	
2022	"Sr."	Herself	Documentary; also producer
2025	Play Dirty	Executive producer	
TBA	A Head Full of Ghosts	Producer	
