= Team Downey =

American production company

Team Downey, LLC
- Type: Private
- Industry: Film
- Founded: 2010; 16 years ago
- Founder: Robert Downey Jr.; Susan Downey
- Headquarters: Los Angeles, California, United States
- Key people: Robert Downey Jr.; Susan Downey; David Gambino
- Products: Film producer; Television production

Team Downey, LLC is an American film and television production company founded by Robert Downey Jr. and Susan Downey.

== History ==
The company was founded in 2010 by American actor Robert Downey Jr., and his wife, American film producer Susan Downey. In its founding, the company entered a first-look deal with Warner Bros. David Gambino is the president of production.

In November 2016, the company entered a first-look deal in television with Sonar Entertainment.

The company remains part of Warner Bros' "top priority projects" such as a live-action adaptation of Pinocchio, and an expanded media franchise shared universe based on Guy Ritchie's Sherlock Holmes (2009) and Sherlock Holmes: A Game of Shadows (2011), in which Downey had starred with Jude Law, consisting of a third feature film and two Max streaming television series as of April 2022.

== Filmography ==
=== Film ===
Year	Film	Director	Notes
2014	The Judge	David Dobkin	
2020	Dolittle	Stephen Gaghan	
2022	"Sr."	Chris Smith	Documentary on Robert Downey Sr.
2025	Play Dirty	Shane Black	co-production with Amazon MGM Studios
TBA	Sherlock Holmes 3	Dexter Fletcher	
TBA	A Head Full of Ghosts	Veronika Franz and Severin Fiala	co-production with Fifth Season and The Allegiance Theatre

=== Television ===
Year	Title	Network	Notes
2019	The Age of A.I.	YouTube Premium	Documentary series
2020–2023	Perry Mason	HBO	
2021–2024	Sweet Tooth	Netflix	
2022	The Bond	Discovery Channel	
2022	The Sunshine Place	Cadence13	
2024	The Sympathizer	HBO	
