= The Futurist (Robert Downey Jr. album) =

Studio album by Robert Downey Jr.
- Released: November 23, 2004
- Recorded: 2004; Elias Arts; Santa Monica, CA; The Village Recorder; Los Angeles, CA
- Genre: Soft rock; jazz pop
- Length: 42:47
- Label: Sony Classical
- Producer: Jonathan Elias; Mark Hudson

Singles from The Futurist
- 1. "Smile" Released: 1993; 2. "Man Like Me" Released: 2005

The Futurist is the only studio album by American actor Robert Downey Jr., produced by Jonathan Elias and Mark Hudson, and released on November 23, 2004, through Sony Classical. The album debuted at number 121 on the Billboard 200 chart, selling 16,000 copies in its first week.

The album received mixed reviews. Downey stated in 2006 that he probably will not do another album, as he felt that the energy he put into doing the album was not compensated. He explained that he did not want to spend whatever time he had at home in the studio, but rather with his family.

== Recording and composition ==
The Futurist consists of eight pop ballads written by Downey, as well as two cover songs: "Smile", a Charlie Chaplin composition; and "Your Move", the first half of the song "I've Seen All Good People" by Yes. The song "Hannah" is an allusion to Downey's 2000 film Wonder Boys.

The album was produced by Jonathan Elias and Mark Hudson, with Downey playing on the piano on some of the tracks.

== Critical reception ==
Professional ratings
Review scores
Source	Rating
AllMusic	3.5/5 stars
USA Today	2.5/4 stars

AllMusic's Matt Collar rated the album 3.5/5, and called Downey's lyrics "obtuse". However, he praised his interpretations of other musicians' work, such as "Your Move" by Yes and Charlie Chaplin's "Smile", and called the album "unpredictably moving as the best of Downey's film work."

Elysa Gardner of USA Today wrote that the vibe on Downey's album "can seem pretentious or simply dull after a while, but there is a moody musicality to tracks such as 'Man Like Me' and 'Details'."

== Track listing ==
All tracks are written by Robert Downey Jr., except where noted.

No.	Title	Writer(s)	Length
1.	"Man Like Me"	Downey; Jenny Harding-Morris	2:56
2.	"Broken"	Downey; Mark Hudson	5:12
3.	"Kimberly Glide"		4:53
4.	"The Futurist"	Downey; Hudson	5:00
5.	"Little Clownz"		3:47
6.	"5:30"		4:11
7.	"Your Move" (Yes cover)	Jon Anderson	4:11
8.	"Details"		3:59
9.	"Hannah"		4:50
10.	"Smile" (Charlie Chaplin cover)	Charlie Chaplin; David Raksin; Geoffrey Parsons; John Turner	3:48

== Personnel ==
Credits adapted from AllMusic.

- Robert Downey Jr. – lead and background vocals, piano, keyboards, Wurlitzer, percussion, photography, CD art adaptation
- Jon Anderson – background vocals on "Your Move"
- Charlie Bisharat – violin
- Alan Broadbent – piano
- Jeff Bunnell – fluglehorn
- Tom Canning – Hammond B3
- Jim Cox – Hammond B3, piano
- Gregg Bissonette – drums
- Vinnie Colaiuta – drums
- Chad Wackerman – drums
- Alec Puro – drums
- Armand Sabal-Lecco – bass
- Nat Williamson – violin
- Jenny Harding-Morris – guest writer – "Man Like Me"
- James Woods-Tickton – bass arrangements
- Lawrence Schwartz – string arrangements
- Cameron Stone – cello
- Jimmy Haun – electric guitar
- Charlie Haden – bass guitar
- Reggie Hamilton – bass
- Sarah Hudson – background vocals
- Steve Dudas – balalaika, acoustic guitar, electric guitar
- Jonathan Elias – production, Hammond organ, photography
- Mark Hudson – production, acoustic guitar, electric guitar, percussion, background vocals, photography
- Kevin Churko – engineering
- Doug Reid – engineering
- Vicenzo LoRusso – engineering, production, photography
- Bruce Sugar – engineering
- Lior Goldenberg – mixing
- Dave Way – mixing
- Bernie Grundman – mastering
- Ghian Wright – engineering assistant
- Vasilia Hughes – production assistant
- Carles Sanchez – production assistant
- Mark Valentine – assistant
- Amy Galland – photography, production coordination
- Jimmy "Sprünge" LaRiccio – photography
- Augustine Dei Wojogbe – art direction, design
- Davis Factor – cover art
- Indio Falconer Downey – CD art adaptation
- Robert Wilson – portraits
- Russell Nachman

== In other media ==
"Broken" plays during the end credits to Downey's 2005 film Kiss Kiss Bang Bang. In the 2016 Marvel Studios film, Captain America: Civil War, Clint Barton mockingly refers to Tony Stark (played by Downey) as "The Futurist".

== Chart performance ==
=== Album ===
Chart (2004)	Peak position
US Billboard 200	121
US Heatseekers Albums (Billboard)	1

=== "Man Like Me" ===
Chart (2005)	Peak position
US Adult Contemporary (Billboard)	39
