= Teen Choice Award for Choice Movie Actor – Action =

Entertainment award category

The following is a list of Teen Choice Award winners and nominees for Choice Movie Actor - Action. This award was first introduced in 2002.

== 2010s ==
Year	Won	Other	Ref.
2010 Teen Choice Awards	Channing Tatum – G.I. Joe: The Rise of Cobra	Nicolas Cage – Kick-Ass; Russell Crowe – Robin Hood; Matt Damon – Green Zone; Robert Downey Jr. – Sherlock Holmes	
2011 Teen Choice Awards	Johnny Depp – The Tourist	Michael Cera – Scott Pilgrim vs. the World; Vin Diesel – Fast Five; Dwayne Johnson – Fast Five; Paul Walker – Fast Five	
2012 Teen Choice Awards			
2013 Teen Choice Awards			
2014 Teen Choice Awards			
2015 Teen Choice Awards			
2016 Teen Choice Awards			
2017 Teen Choice Awards	Chris Pine – Wonder Woman	Johnny Depp – Pirates of the Caribbean: Dead Men Tell No Tales; Vin Diesel – XXX: Return of Xander Cage & The Fate of the Furious; Hugh Jackman – Logan; Dwayne Johnson – The Fate of the Furious; Brenton Thwaites – Pirates of the Caribbean: Dead Men Tell No Tales	
2018 Teen Choice Awards	Robert Downey Jr. – Avengers: Infinity War as Tony Stark / Iron Man	John Boyega – Pacific Rim: Uprising as Jake Pentecost; Henry Cavill – Justice League as Clark Kent / Superman; Chris Evans – Avengers: Infinity War as Steve Rogers / Captain America; Tom Holland – Avengers: Infinity War as Peter Parker / Spider-Man; Dylan O'Brien – Maze Runner: The Death Cure as Thomas	
2019 Teen Choice Awards	Robert Downey Jr. – Avengers: Endgame as Tony Stark / Iron Man	John Cena – Bumblebee as Jack Burns; Chris Evans – Avengers: Endgame as Steve Rogers / Captain America; Chris Hemsworth – Avengers: Endgame/Men in Black: International as Thor; Henry/Agent H; Samuel L. Jackson – Captain Marvel as Nick Fury; Paul Rudd – Ant-Man and the Wasp/Avengers: Endgame as Scott Lang / Ant-Man	
