= Deborah Falconer =

American actress

- Occupations: Actress; singer; songwriter; model
- Years active: 1988–1993 (actress); 2003–present (singer)
- Spouse: Robert Downey Jr. (m. 1992; div. 2004)
- Children: 1

Deborah Falconer is an American singer, songwriter, model, and actress. Her first album was Untangle. She released her second album, Brave Like Me, on July 22, 2003. Her third album, Lift Your Gaze, was released on October 18, 2014.

== Personal life ==
Falconer married Robert Downey Jr. on May 29, 1992, after dating for 42 days. The couple divorced on April 26, 2004. They have one son together, Indio.

== Filmography ==
=== Film ===
Year	Title	Role	Notes
1988	The Wrong Guys	Wendy	
1991	The Doors	John Densmore's Girlfriend	
1991	Pyrates	Rivkah	
1993	Mr. Bluesman	Chloe	
1993	Short Cuts	Barbara	
1993	The Last Party	—N/a	Documentary

=== Television ===
Year	Title	Role	Notes
1991	Brotherhood of the Gun	Allison McBride	Television film
