= Pound (film) =

1970 American comedy film

- Directed by: Robert Downey Sr.
- Written by: Robert Downey Sr.
- Starring: Charles Dierkop; Don Calfa; Antonio Fargas; Chuck Green; Marshall Efron
- Cinematography: Gerald Cotts
- Edited by: Bud Smith
- Music by: Charley Cuva
- Production company: Pound Company
- Distributed by: United Artists
- Release date: August 12, 1970
- Running time: 92 minutes
- Country: United States
- Language: English

Pound is a 1970 American comedy film written and directed by Robert Downey Sr. It was based on The Comeuppance, an Off-Off Broadway play written by Downey in 1961. It is about several dogs, along with a Siamese cat and a penguin, at a pound, as they await being euthanised; the animals are played by human actors. The film is best known for marking the acting debut of Downey's son and namesake, then-5-year-old Robert Jr., as Puppy.

== Cast ==
- Lawrence Wolf as Mexican Hairless
- Stan Gottlieb as Boxer
- Charles Dierkop as Airdale
- Elsie Downey as Mutt Bitch
- Carolyn Groves as Pedigreed
- Lucille Rogers as Old Pekingese
- Ching Yeh as Siamese Cat
- George Morgan as Irish Setter
- Don Calfa as Italian Terrier
- Antonio Fargas as Greyhound
- Chuck Green as Mutt
- Buddy Butler as Singing Water Spaniel
- Harry Rigby as Fowl
- Marshall Efron as Dachshund
- Eric Krupnik as Montana Sheepdog
- Eric Crawley as Baltimore Pointer
- Carolyn Cardwell as Keeper
- Joe Madden as Colonel
- James Green as Honky Killer
- L. Errol Jaye as Lieutenant Weintraub
- Mari-Claire Charba as Killer's Wife
- Robert Downey Jr. as Puppy
- Carl Lee as Thief

== See also ==
- List of American films of 1970
