= "Sr." =

- Promotional poster
- Directed by: Chris Smith
- Produced by: Robert Downey Jr.; Susan Downey; Emily Barclay Ford; Kevin Ford
- Starring: Robert Downey Jr.; Robert Downey Sr.
- Cinematography: Chris Smith; Kevin Ford
- Edited by: Kevin Ford
- Production company: Team Downey
- Distributed by: Netflix
- Release date: November 18, 2022
- Running time: 89 minutes
- Country: United States
- Language: English

"Sr." is a 2022 American documentary film that examines the careers and relationship between Robert Downey Jr. and his father, Robert Downey Sr. The film, directed by Chris Smith, was released theatrically on November 18, 2022, and was released on Netflix on December 2.

== Premise ==
Robert Downey Jr. recounts the life and career of his father Robert Downey Sr.

== Cast ==
- Robert Downey Jr.
- Robert Downey Sr.
- Paul Thomas Anderson
- Alan Arkin
- Mezi Atwood
- Sean Hayes
- Norman Lear
- Lawrence Wolf

== Release ==
"Sr." first premiered at the 2022 Telluride Film Festival in September.

"Sr." was released in selected theatres on November 18, 2022, before streaming on Netflix beginning December 2. The trailer of the film was released by Netflix on November 14.

== Reception ==
On the review aggregator website Rotten Tomatoes, 97% of 58 critics' reviews are positive, with an average rating of 7.8/10. The website's consensus reads: "Sr. is an illuminating look at a fascinating filmmaker -- and a poignant tribute to a father from his son." Metacritic, which uses a weighted average, assigned the film a score of 78 out of 100, based on 19 critics, indicating "generally favorable" reviews.

Gary Goldstein of the Los Angeles Times wrote: "Sr. proves a tender portrait and fitting tribute to an offbeat hero and creative pioneer." Brian Tallerico of RogerEbert.com gave the film three out of four stars, stating that although the documentary "sometimes feels like it's playing tug-of-war between something one would watch in a film studies class and something one would watch in a psychology class", its approach makes it feel more personal.

The film won the National Board of Review Award for Best Documentary Feature.
