= Robert Downey Jr. =

American actor (born 1965)

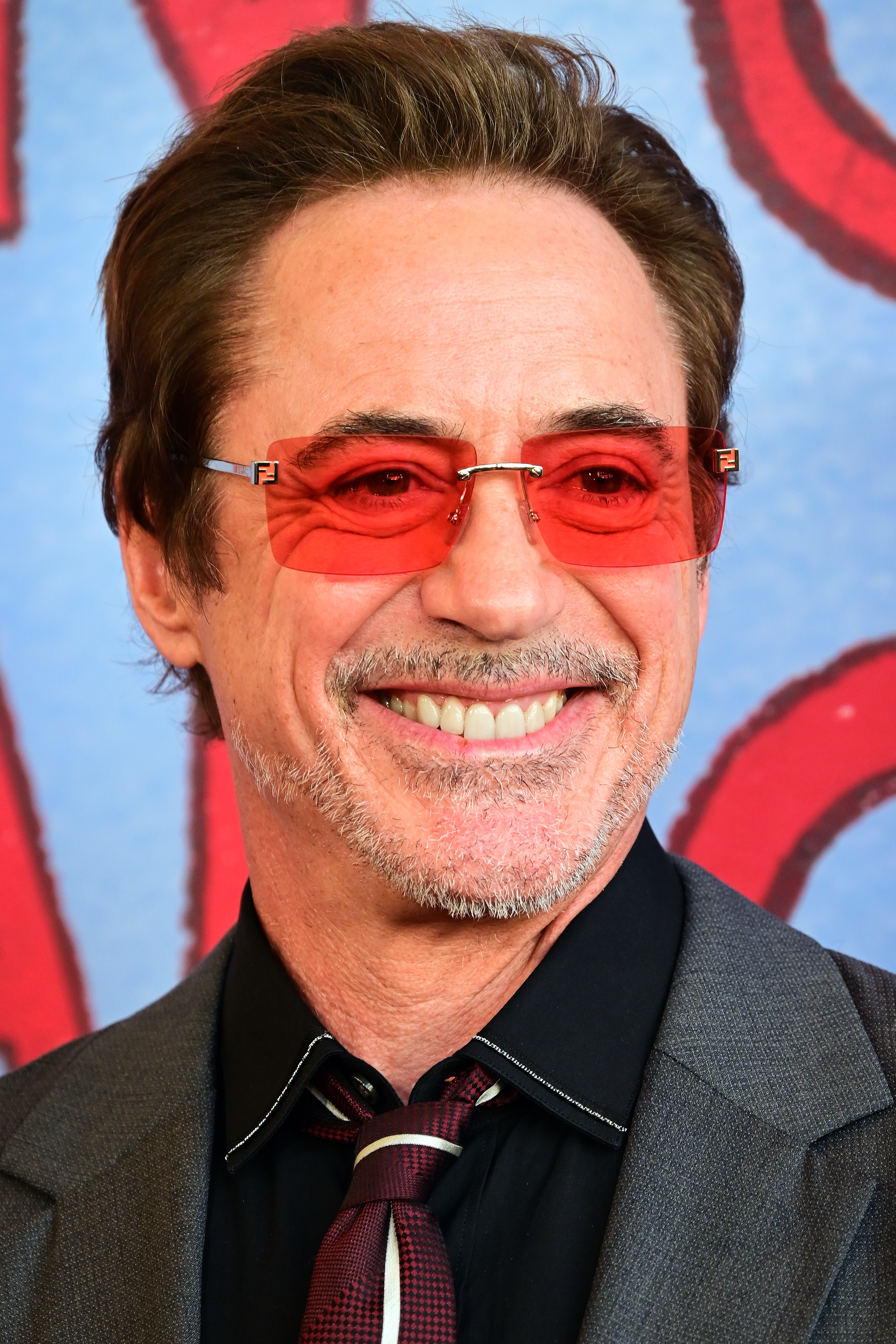
- Downey in 2026
- Born: April 4, 1965 (age 61); New York City, U.S.
- Occupations: Actor; producer; singer
- Years active: 1970–present
- Works: Filmography
- Spouses: Deborah Falconer (m. 1992; div. 2004); Susan Levin (m. 2005)
- Partner: Sarah Jessica Parker (1984–1991)
- Children: 3
- Father: Robert Downey Sr.
- Awards: Full list

Robert John Downey Jr. (born April 4, 1965) is an American actor and producer. His films as a leading actor have grossed over $14.3 billion worldwide, making him one of the highest-grossing actors of all time. Downey was the highest-paid actor in the world annually from 2013 to 2015. Known for his versatility across roles, he is the recipient of various accolades, including an Academy Award, a Daytime Emmy Award, three Golden Globe Awards, and two British Academy Film Awards.

At the age of five, Downey made his acting debut in his father Robert Downey Sr.'s film Pound (1970). He rose to prominence by working with the Brat Pack for the teen films Weird Science (1985) and Less than Zero (1987). His portrayal of Charlie Chaplin in the biopic Chaplin (1992) earned him the BAFTA Award for Best Actor and an Academy Award nomination. After spending less than a year at a treatment facility on drug charges, Downey joined the television series Ally McBeal in 2000, earning a Golden Globe for his performance. Dismissed from the show in 2001 following further drug-related arrests, he entered a court-ordered rehabilitation program and has remained sober since 2003.

Downey revitalized his career and achieved global recognition by starring as Iron Man in ten Marvel Cinematic Universe films, beginning with Iron Man (2008). He earned his second Academy Award nomination for his performance in the satirical comedy Tropic Thunder (2008) and later won the Academy Award for Best Supporting Actor for his portrayal of bureaucrat Lewis Strauss in Christopher Nolan's Oppenheimer (2023). He earned a Golden Globe Award nomination for portraying the titular character in Sherlock Holmes (2009). In 2024, he was nominated for a Primetime Emmy Award for the miniseries The Sympathizer and made his Broadway debut in the title role of Ayad Akhtar's McNeal.

Time named Downey one of the 100 most influential people in the world in 2008 and Forbes featured him on the Celebrity 100 in 2013 and 2014. He has pursued music, releasing the jazz-pop album The Futurist (2004), which charted on the US Billboard 200. Divorced from singer Deborah Falconer, Downey has been married to film producer Susan Levin since 2005; they co-founded the production company Team Downey. Downey has three children: one with Falconer and two with Levin. In 2025, he was named one of the greatest film actors of the 21st century by The Independent.

== Early life and acting background ==
Robert John Downey Jr. was born in Manhattan, a borough of New York City, on April 4, 1965. His father, Robert Downey Sr. (né Elias), was a filmmaker with Lithuanian Jewish and Irish ancestry. His mother, Elsie Ann (née Ford), was an actress who appeared in Robert Sr.'s films and had Scottish, German, and Swiss ancestry. Downey's sister, Allyson, is about a year and a half older than he.

Due to his father's film projects, Downey moved frequently during his childhood, living in places such as Woodstock, New York; London, England; New Mexico; California; Connecticut; and Greenwich Village in New York City. From a young age, Downey was exposed to drugs: his father struggled with addiction, and his mother battled alcoholism. His father introduced him to marijuana at either age six or eight; Robert Sr. later expressed regret for doing so. Downey mentioned that using drugs with his father created an emotional connection between them, explaining that, "When my dad and I used drugs together, it was his way of showing love for me in the only manner he knew." During his childhood, he appeared in small roles in his father's films. He made his acting debut at the age of five, portraying a sick puppy in the absurdist comedy film Pound (1970), and at seven, he appeared in the Western film Greaser's Palace (1972). At ages eleven and twelve, he attended Stagedoor Manor, a summer acting camp in upstate New York.

In school, Downey was a hyperactive child who "tried to be cool", often teased by the older boys but popular with the girls. His parents divorced when he was twelve; afterward, he lived with his mother in a fifth-floor apartment in New York City, while his sister stayed with their father, who later took her to a boarding school. He attended Lincoln Junior High School for eighth grade and then Santa Monica High School for ninth and tenth grades, but dropped out in 1982. At age 17, Downey relocated to his home town to pursue acting full-time, working several jobs such as clearing tables at a Central Falls restaurant, working in a shoe store, and performing as "living art" at the nightclub Area to support himself during auditions. During this period, he also appeared in local theater and off-Broadway productions.

== Career ==
=== 1983–1995: Early work and critical acclaim ===
Downey made his stage debut in 1983 with a three-week run in Alms for the Middle Class at the Geva Theatre Center in Rochester, New York. He then appeared in the short-lived off-Broadway musical American Passion at the Joyce Theater, produced by Norman Lear. Downey's first credited film role was in Baby It's You (1983), though most of his scenes were cut. In his early film roles, he frequently portrayed misfit characters, and his portrayals of punk-like figures in several 1980s coming-of-age films led to his occasional association with the Brat Pack. In the drama film Firstborn (1984), he played a supporting role as the teenage friend of the protagonist. Downey then traveled to Los Angeles to film Tuff Turf (1985), in which he played James Spader's sidekick and a punk drummer. Later that year, his role as a bully in John Hughes's Weird Science (1985) marked his breakthrough. Downey starred as a radical socialist in the Alan Metter comedy film Back to School (1987).

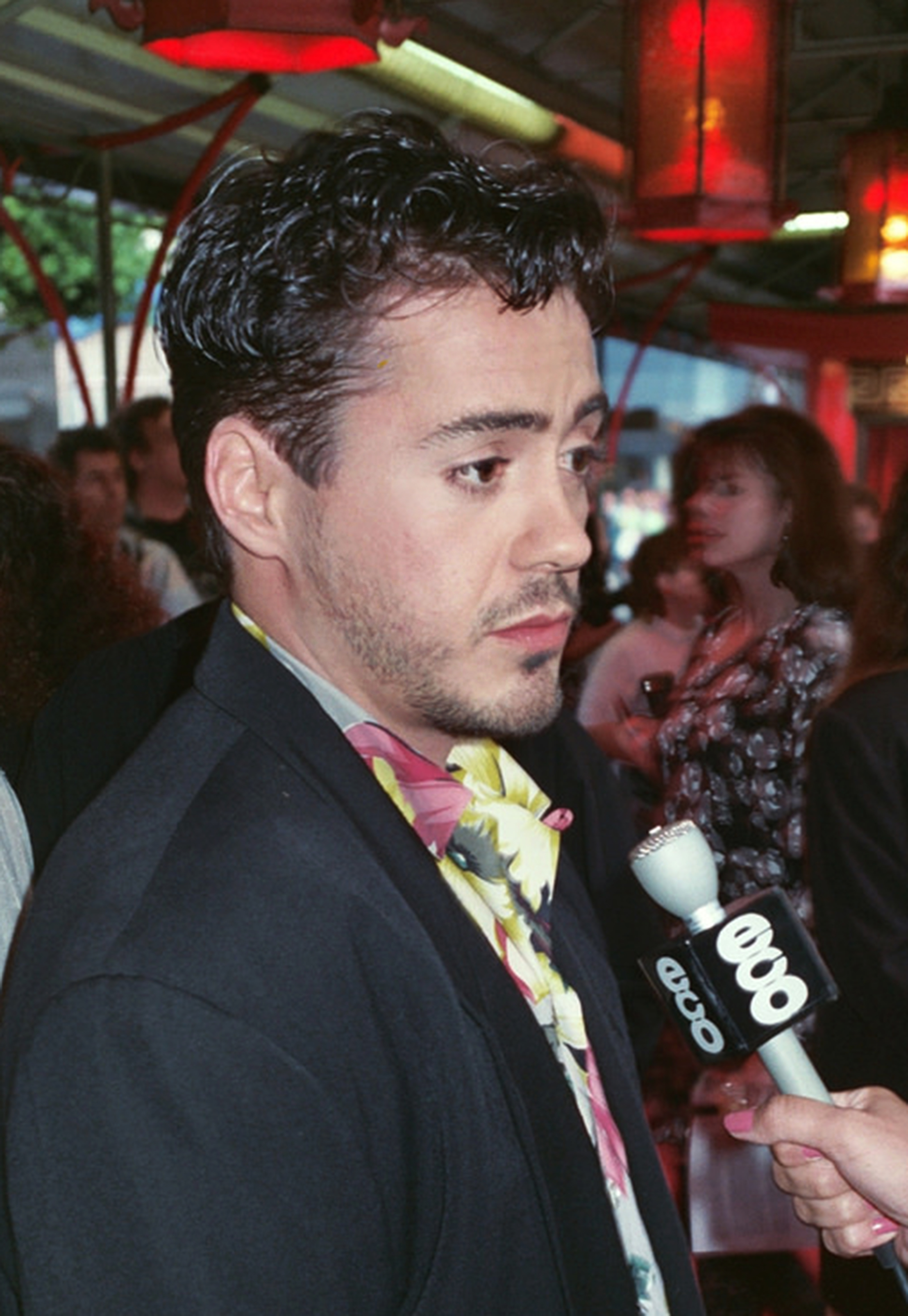
Downey at the premiere of Air America in 1990

In 1985, Downey joined the new, younger cast of Saturday Night Live, securing the audition with help from his Weird Science co-star and friend Anthony Michael Hall. After a season of poor ratings and criticism of the cast's comedic ability, he and most of the new members were dismissed. Downey's first leading role came in The Pick-up Artist (1987), which faced criticism for being "sexually irresponsible" because of its portrayal of promiscuous sex during a period of heightened AIDS awareness. He earned critical acclaim for his role as a drug-addicted rich boy whose life rapidly spirals out of control in the drama film Less than Zero (1987), the film adaptation of Bret Easton Ellis's 1985 novel. Critic Roger Ebert called his performance "so real, so subtle and so observant that it's scary", and Janet Maslin, in The New York Times, deemed it "desperately moving". Downey said that the role felt like "the ghost of Christmas Future" for him, as his drug habit led him to become an "exaggeration of the character" in real life.

Shortly after completing Less than Zero, Downey entered rehab for the first time, beginning a decade-long cycle of interventions and treatment stints that culminated in his 1996 arrest. He starred alongside Kiefer Sutherland and Winona Ryder in the teen drama film 1969 (1988). The film saw mixed reception, though his performance garnered good reviews from writers at Variety and Deseret News. Downey went on to star in the films Chances Are (1989) with Cybill Shepherd and Ryan O'Neal, Air America (1990) with Mel Gibson, and Soapdish (1991) with Sally Field, Kevin Kline, Cathy Moriarty, and Whoopi Goldberg; each saw varying critical success. Downey trained extensively to prepare for his portrayal of comic actor and filmmaker Charlie Chaplin in the biopic Chaplin (1992), learning to play the violin and tennis left-handed, and working with a coach to replicate Chaplin's accent and mannerisms. Although the film was a box-office bomb, Downey's performance received critical acclaim. It earned him the BAFTA Award for Best Actor, as well as Academy Award and Golden Globe Award nominations.

Oh come on—that's too much! You're going too far, Robert, [...] you're ruining my movie! Forget the dumb dick idea. [...] This isn't some slapstick bullshit

— Oliver Stone recalled shouting at Downey during the filming of Natural Born Killers (1994)

In 1993, Downey starred in Heart and Souls, playing a man possessed by multiple characters—a performance that critic Peter Travers praised as revealing his "explosive talent for physical comedy". In Only You (1994), co-starring Marisa Tomei and Billy Zane, Downey played Peter Wright, a professional dancer who poses as the soulmate for Tomei's character Faith. Norman Jewison, the film's director, cast Downey because he reminded him of Tony Curtis: "charming with great comedic timing". In preparation for his role of reporter Wayne Gale in Natural Born Killers (1994), Downey shadowed Australian television shock journalist Steve Dunleavy, which helped him develop an Australian accent. The film proved successful at the box office, grossing $110 million on a $34 million budget. Throughout 1995, he took on a string of diverse roles, appearing in the period drama Restoration, the Shakespearean adaptation Richard III, and the family ensemble Home for the Holidays.

=== 1996–2001: Addiction-related setbacks and Ally McBeal ===
In early 1996, concerned for Downey's well-being, Sean Penn and Dennis Quaid went to his home, took his car keys, and brought him to a rehab facility in Tucson, Arizona, but he checked himself out a few days later. In June 1996, he was arrested for possession of heroin, cocaine, crack cocaine, and an unloaded .357 Magnum handgun while speeding down Sunset Boulevard. A month later, while under the influence of a controlled substance, he entered a neighbor's home through an unlocked front door and fell asleep on their child's bed. The family declined to press trespassing charges. The 911 call made by the neighbor was later circulated online and became known as the "Goldilocks incident". In September 1996, he pleaded no contest; two months later, following a period in court-ordered rehab, he was sentenced to another six months of live-in rehabilitation, three years' probation, and compulsory drug testing.

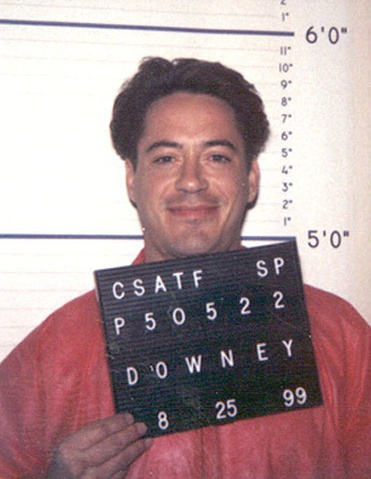
Mugshot from his arrest in August 1999

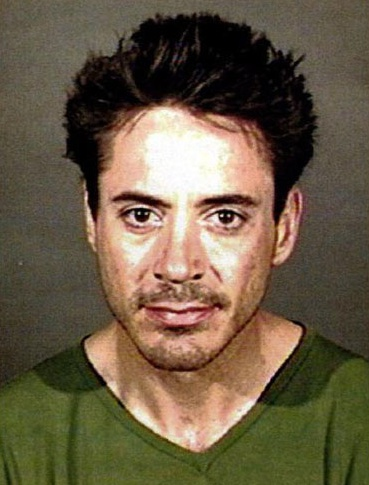
Mugshot from his arrest in April 2001

Downey starred in Two Girls and a Guy (1997), portraying a duplicitous man who convinces each of two women that she is his only love. After missing a court-ordered drug test in 1997, he spent six months in Los Angeles County Jail. In January 1998, he was briefly released from jail to film U.S. Marshals. Upon his full release, he entered a court-mandated 120-day rehab program and then starred in Black and White (1999), playing Terry Donager, the gay husband of a documentary filmmaker. That year, after maintaining sobriety during the filming of Wonder Boys (2000), Downey relapsed. At the time, he was facing financial difficulties and had lost his house in Malibu. Later that year, after missing another court-ordered drug test, he was arrested again. Despite his lawyer Robert Shapiro assembling the same legal team that had successfully defended O. J. Simpson in his criminal trial, Downey was sentenced to a three-year prison term at the California Substance Abuse Treatment Facility and State Prison in Corcoran. At the time of his arrest, all of Downey's film projects had been completed and were nearing release. He had also been hired to voice the devil in the NBC animated series God, the Devil and Bob, but was dismissed after failing to attend rehearsals.

After spending nearly a year in the Corcoran prison, Downey was unexpectedly released in 2000 on the condition of posting a $5,000 bail, when a judge ruled that his cumulative time in incarceration facilities—from his initial 1996 arrests—qualified him for early release. A week after his release, he joined the cast of the television series Ally McBeal as a new love interest. For his performance, he was nominated for the Primetime Emmy Award for Outstanding Supporting Actor in a Comedy Series and won the Golden Globe Award for Best Supporting Actor – Series, Miniseries, or Television Film. In retrospect, Downey described his performance as overrated, deeming it his "lowest point in terms of addictions". Before the end of his first season on Ally McBeal, Downey was arrested on Thanksgiving in 2000, after police responded to an anonymous 911 call and searched his room at Merv Griffin's Hotel and Givenchy Spa in Palm Springs, California. He was found under the influence of a controlled substance and in possession of cocaine and valium. Despite facing a prison sentence of up to four years and eight months if convicted, Downey committed to appear in at least eight more episodes of Ally McBeal.

In April 2001, while on parole, Downey was found wandering barefoot in Culver City by a Los Angeles police officer. He was arrested on suspicion of being under the influence of drugs but was released a few hours later, even though tests confirmed the presence of cocaine in his system. After the arrest, the producers of Ally McBeal ordered last-minute rewrites and reshoots before dismissing him from the series, despite his character having boosted the show's ratings. In July 2001, Downey pleaded no contest to the Palm Springs charges, avoiding jail time. Instead, he was ordered into drug rehabilitation and sentenced to three years of probation under California Proposition 36, which had been enacted to direct nonviolent drug offenders toward treatment rather than prison. He spent a year in Wavelengths International, a court-mandated rehabilitation facility. By this time Downey was homeless, considered too great an insurance risk to be employable, and facing bankruptcy.

=== 2001–2007: Recovery and comeback ===
I said, 'You know what? I don't think I can continue doing this.' And I reached out for help, and I ran with it. You can reach out for help in kind of a half-assed way and you'll get it and you won't take advantage of it. It's not that difficult to overcome these seemingly ghastly problems [...] what's hard is to decide to do it.

— Downey speaking to Oprah Winfrey in November 2004

After five years of substance abuse, arrests, and relapse, Downey began working toward a full recovery in 2001. His first acting job after rehabilitation came in August, when he appeared lip-syncing in the music video for Elton John's single "I Want Love", directed by Sam Taylor-Wood. Two years later, he returned to film with The Singing Detective (2003), directed by his Back to School co-star Keith Gordon, after Mel Gibson paid his insurance bond, allowing him to be cast. He played Dan Dark, a paralyzed, suffering pulp novelist who hallucinates and drifts between reality and fantasy. Although the film received mixed reviews, Downey regarded it as a personal achievement. For Gothika (2003), producer Joel Silver withheld 40 percent of Downey's salary until production was completed as protection against potential issues related to his addiction.

Silver secured Downey the lead role in Shane Black's directorial debut, the comedy thriller Kiss Kiss Bang Bang (2005). Downey received positive reviews for his performance: Mike Russell, writing in The Oregonian, called it "one of [his] most enjoyable performances", and a writer for The Age deemed it a "terrific comic performance". Downey appeared in a range of leading and supporting roles, gaining particular recognition for his performances in several semi-independent films. In Good Night, and Good Luck (2005), he portrayed a CBS journalist and editor secretly married to a coworker, a relationship concealed due to the network's policy prohibiting employees from marrying one another. His role as a drug addict in Richard Linklater's dystopian, rotoscoped film A Scanner Darkly (2006) was praised; Travers called his performance "the film's flashiest and most ferociously entertaining", and critic J. Hoberman regarded it as "the performance to beat" that year. Downey's character in Steven Shainberg's fictional biographical drama Fur (2006) was a composite representing the two most significant influences on Diane Arbus's professional life, Lisette Model and Marvin Israel. Fur was poorly received by critics, but they lauded Downey's performance.

In 2005, Downey voiced the character of Patrick Pewterschmidt for an episode of Family Guy titled "The Fat Guy Strangler". That year, Downey signed a deal with HarperCollins to publish a memoir, which he described as a candid account of his life and career. In 2008, he returned his advance and canceled the project without explanation. In 2007, he appeared in David Fincher's mystery thriller Zodiac, based on true events, portraying San Francisco Chronicle journalist Paul Avery, who covered the Zodiac Killer case. Downey's performance was critically acclaimed; a Tuscaloosa News writer deemed it one of his best, and critic Manohla Dargis remarked that he was at the "top of [his] performance game".

=== 2008–2019: Commercial success and stardom as Iron Man ===
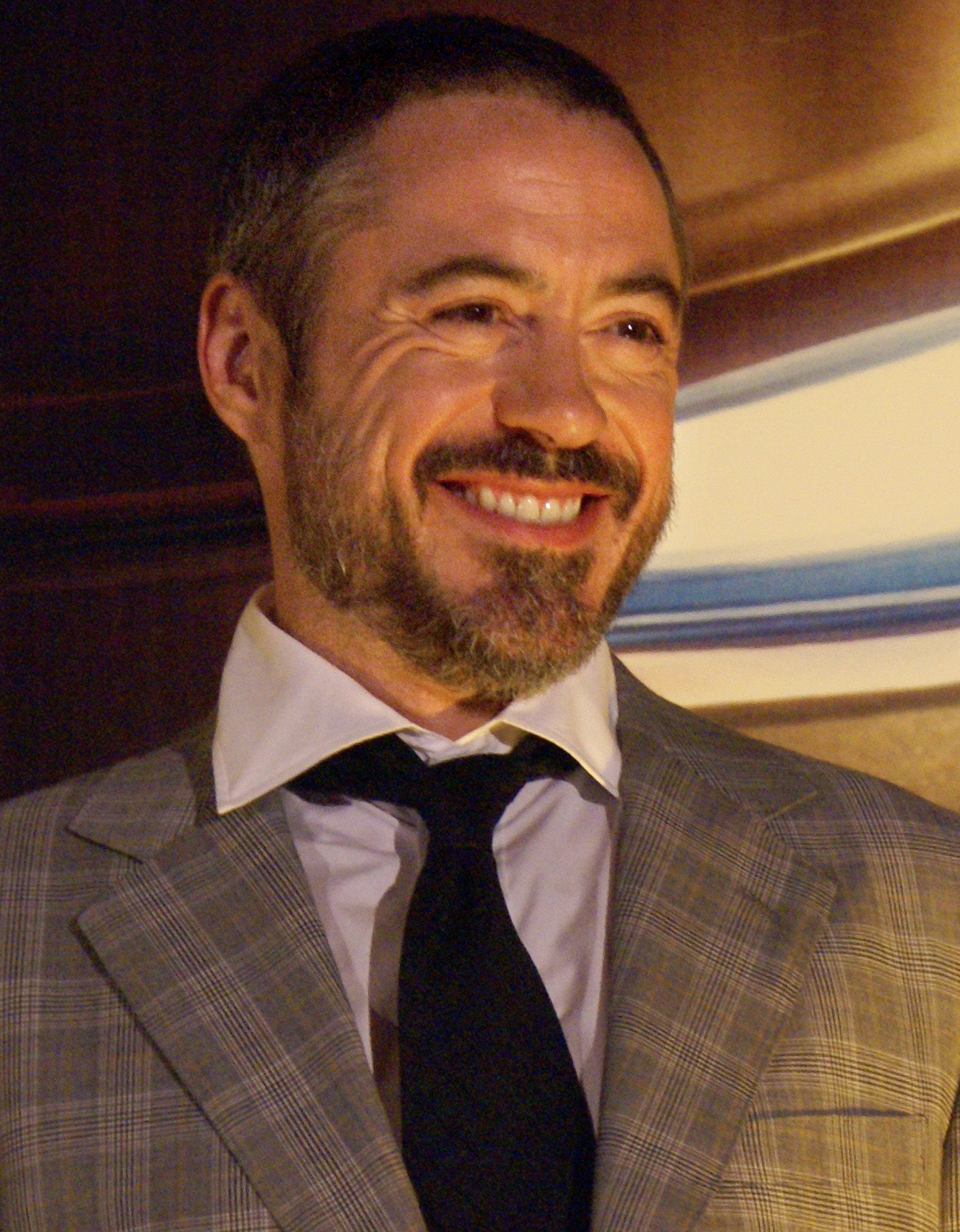
Downey at an event for Iron Man in 2008

In 2006, Downey was cast as the titular character in Iron Man, a superhero film. Director Jon Favreau explained that although Downey was not the most obvious choice, "he understood what makes the character tick. He found a lot of his own life experience in 'Tony Stark'." Favreau strongly advocated for Downey's casting, believing he could elevate the film's quality and generate widespread audience interest, much like Johnny Depp had done for the Pirates of the Caribbean series. Downey gained more than twenty pounds (nine kilograms) of muscle over five months to achieve the physicality required for the part. Iron Man was released on May 2, 2008, in the US. It became the eighth-highest-grossing film of 2008, earning more than $585 million worldwide against a production budget of $130 million.

In Iron Man, Downey portrayed Tony Stark, a wealthy industrialist who is kidnapped and forced to build a deadly missile, only to instead construct a suit of armor that transforms him into the superhero Iron Man. Both the film and Downey's performance were acclaimed by critics, many of whom considered his portrayal the standout element of Iron Man and credited it with catapulting him to global stardom. Ebert wrote that "it's Robert Downey Jr. who powers the lift-off separating this from most other superhero movies", and, in a retrospective Variety article, Zack Sharf credited Downey's charisma with making Iron Man both a critical and commercial success. By October 2008, Downey had signed on to reprise his role in two sequels to Iron Man and in The Avengers (2012), the latter of which featured the superhero team that Stark joins, based on Marvel's comic book series of the same name. He first reprised the role with a brief appearance as Stark in the film The Incredible Hulk (2008), as part of Marvel Studios' initiative to depict the same Marvel Universe on film by providing continuity among the films.

Downey starred in Tropic Thunder alongside Ben Stiller and Jack Black, the former of whom also directed the film. The three actors portray exaggerated Hollywood archetypes, Downey playing Kirk Lazarus, a self-absorbed, multi–Oscar-winning Australian method actor starring in an overblown Vietnam War film titled Tropic Thunder. To embody his character, African-American platoon sergeant Lincoln Osiris, Lazarus undergoes a controversial skin pigmentation procedure, requiring Downey to wear dark makeup and a wig. Released in August 2008, Tropic Thunder opened atop the American box office and retained the number-one position for three consecutive weeks, eventually grossing $195 million worldwide on a budget of about $90 million. For his portrayal of Lazarus, Downey was nominated for the Academy Award for Best Supporting Actor. He then portrayed Steve Lopez in the biopic The Soloist (2009), a Los Angeles Times columnist who discovers a homeless man playing a violin with virtuoso skill.

Downey played the titular detective in Guy Ritchie's Sherlock Holmes (2009). The Times praised the lead performances, describing Downey as "terrific" and commending Ritchie for eliciting "a career-best performance from [Jude] Law", though it noted that their double act struggled to sustain "an overlong film". Sherlock Holmes became the eighth-highest-grossing film of 2009 and won Downey the Golden Globe Award for Best Actor in a Motion Picture – Musical or Comedy. Downey reprised his role as Stark in Iron Man 2, the first of two planned sequels to Iron Man. Released in May 2010 in the US, the film grossed over $623 million worldwide, ranking as the seventh highest-grossing film of the year. Set six months after Iron Man, the film follows Stark as he rejects government demands to share his technology, while facing the vengeful scientist Ivan Vanko. Ebert called Downey's performance "intriguing" and "unexpected", stating that "he doesn't behave like most superheroes: he lacks the psychic weight and gravitas".

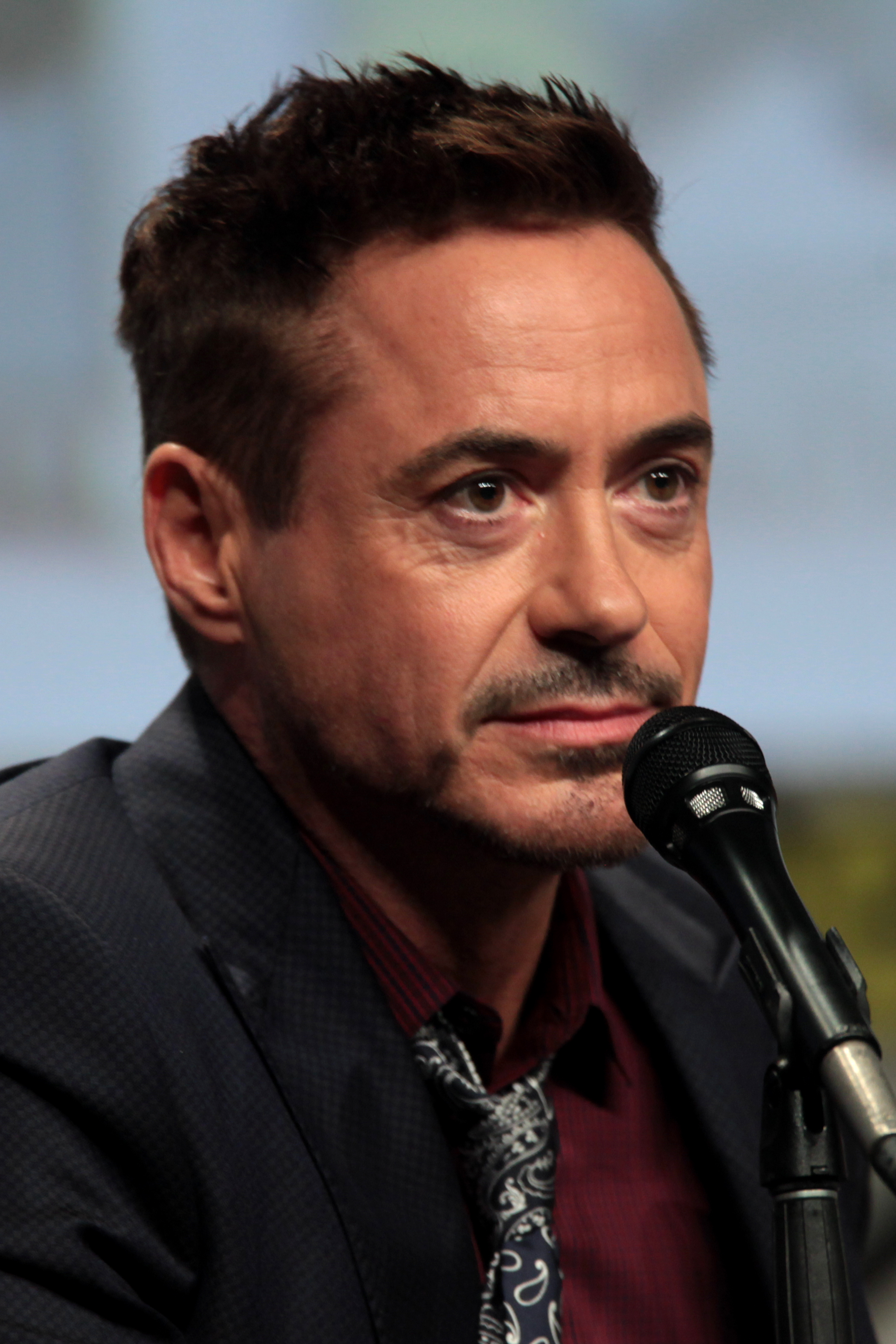
Downey at the 2014 San Diego Comic-Con

Downey's other film role of 2010 was in Due Date, which was filmed across several locations in the US, including Georgia, New Mexico, Arizona, and California. In it, he played an architect trying to get from Atlanta to Los Angeles in time for his wife's scheduled cesarean section. The film was a box-office success, earning over $211 million on a budget of $65 million. That year, Downey and his wife Susan opened their own production company called Team Downey. Downey reprised his role as Sherlock Holmes in Sherlock Holmes: A Game of Shadows (2011), the sequel to the 2009 film. In A Game of Shadows, he investigates a conspiracy led by his nemesis, Professor Moriarty, and works to prevent an impending world war. Todd McCarthy of The Hollywood Reporter lauded the film's "more mannered shenanigans", whose action-oriented antics "play straight to modern audiences' tastes".

Downey reprised the role of Stark in The Avengers (2012). In the film, the Avengers assemble to stop Loki from conquering Earth using the Tesseract (Note: The Tesseract in Marvel is a cube-shaped container for the Space Stone, one of the six Infinity Stones. It holds unlimited energy and can be used to open gateways for instantaneous travel to any point in the universe.) to open a portal for an alien invasion. The film was both a critical and commercial success; grossing over $1.52 billion, it became the third-highest-grossing film of all time. In Iron Man 3 (2013), Stark faces threats from a terrorist known as the Mandarin while dealing with the aftermath of previous events and developing new technology to confront his enemies. Iron Man 3 grossed $1.215 billion, making it the fifth-highest-grossing film of all time upon release. He then portrayed a Chicago lawyer in The Judge (2014)—the first production by Team Downey. He reprised the role as Tony Stark in Avengers: Age of Ultron (2015), in which Stark creates Ultron as a flawed global defense artificial intelligence and then leads the Avengers in their efforts to stop it, ultimately helping to bring Vision to life and defeat Ultron. Age of Ultron garnered $1.405 billion in revenue to become the fifth-highest-grossing film in history.

In Captain America: Civil War (2016), Stark backs government control of the Avengers, recruits Spider-Man, and ends up fighting Captain America and Bucky after discovering the latter killed his parents. Stark continues mentoring Spider-Man in Spider-Man: Homecoming (2017), and the two team up in Avengers: Infinity War (2018) alongside Doctor Strange to fight Thanos on Titan, where Stark devises a plan to remove the Infinity Gauntlet, survives a brutal stabbing, and witnesses half his allies disintegrate in the Snap. He helps invent time travel to retrieve the Infinity Stones in Avengers: Endgame (2019), ultimately sacrificing his life by snapping his fingers to destroy Thanos and his army, saving the universe. Endgame became the first superhero film to gross over $2 billion worldwide, and was the highest-grossing film of all time until it was surpassed by Avatar (2009) due to its 2021 re-release in China.

=== 2020–present: Expansion and return to Marvel ===
In 2020, Downey starred in Stephen Gaghan's Dolittle, portraying the titular 19th-century Welsh veterinarian who can communicate with animals. The second film produced by Team Downey, it was a box-office disappointment and received largely negative reviews, critics citing its excessive length and lackluster execution. In 2023, Downey portrayed the antagonistic bureaucrat Lewis Strauss in Christopher Nolan's Oppenheimer. He accepted a pay cut for the role, earning $4 million instead of his usual $10–20 million upfront salary. Downey later called Oppenheimer "the best film" he had appeared in. Both the biopic and his performance received widespread critical acclaim. For his role, he won the Golden Globe, BAFTA, Screen Actors Guild, Critics' Choice, and Academy Award for Best Supporting Actor. That year, Downey hosted the television series Downey's Dream Cars, in which he and his team converted several of his vehicles from gas to electric. The show won Downey the Daytime Emmy Award for Outstanding Lifestyle Program.

Downey next starred in a 2024 television adaptation of Viet Thanh Nguyen's historical satire novel The Sympathizer on HBO, portraying five supporting antagonistic roles representing the American establishment. His multi-role performance earned him a Primetime Emmy nomination for Outstanding Supporting Actor in a Limited or Anthology Series or Movie. Downey made his Broadway debut in McNeal, from playwright Ayad Akhtar, playing Jacob McNeal, a gifted novelist with a difficult family life and a potentially problematic interest in artificial intelligence. Previews began on September 5, 2024, and opened on September 30 at Lincoln Center's Vivian Beaumont Theater, playing through November 24. In July 2024 at San Diego Comic-Con, it was announced that Downey would return to the Marvel Cinematic Universe as Victor von Doom / Doctor Doom in the upcoming films Avengers: Doomsday (2026) and Avengers: Secret Wars (2027).

== Other ventures ==
=== Music ===
Downey has ventured into music. He has sung on several soundtracks for his films, including Chaplin, Too Much Sun, Two Girls and a Guy, Friends and Lovers, and The Singing Detective. On November 23, 2004, he released his only studio album, The Futurist. A jazz-pop-infused record, The Futurist was produced by Jonathan Elias and Mark Hudson; Downey played the piano on some of the tracks. The album debuted at number 121 on the Billboard 200 chart, selling 16,000 copies in its first week. A USA Today critic opined that the album could be perceived as "pretentious" or "simply dull" after a while, but "there is a moody musicality to tracks such as 'Man Like Me' and 'Details'".

While promoting Tropic Thunder, Downey and his co-stars Ben Stiller and Jack Black were back-up singers for the Pips to Gladys Knight singing "Midnight Train to Georgia" for the season 7 finale of American Idol in 2008. Downey has repeatedly collaborated with the English musician Sting. As well as their 2001 duet of the Police's "Every Breath You Take" on an episode of Ally McBeal, the two performed "Driven to Tears" together live at Sting's 60th birthday concert in October 2011. That year, both appeared on Jonathan Elias's Prayer Cycle 2: Path to Zero, a benefit album supporting the anti-nuclear organization Global Zero.

=== Social activism ===
In a 2008 interview by The New York Times, Downey said that his time in prison had shifted his political perspective, explaining: "I have a really interesting political point of view [...] [the time in prison] was very, very, very educational for me and has informed my proclivities and politics ever since". When asked about the quote in a 2015 interview promoting Avengers: Age of Ultron, he denied that his previous statement reflected any longstanding beliefs on his part, explaining that he does not identify as either a Republican, liberal, or Democrat.

Downey has expressed support for the Democratic Party throughout his career. He donated to Barack Obama's 2012 presidential campaign, and, four years later, appeared in an online video encouraging Americans to vote against Donald Trump in the then-upcoming presidential election. He joined fellow Avengers cast members and Vice Presidential nominee Kamala Harris for a virtual fundraiser supporting Joe Biden's 2020 campaign. In 2024, Downey and his Avengers castmates once again came together to endorse Harris in her presidential bid that year.

Downey serves on the board of the Anti-Recidivism Coalition, a nonprofit organization that advocates for criminal justice reform to reduce incarceration, improve the outcomes of formerly incarcerated individuals, and build healthier communities. In 2020, he founded the organization Footprint Coalition, which aims to use advanced technologies like robotics and nanotechnology to help clean up and restore the environment. The coalition supports and promotes environmentally sustainable technologies, including the French insect-farming company Ÿnsect, bio-based plastic alternative manufacturer RWDC, and bamboo toilet paper producer Cloud Paper. Downey co-wrote the book Cool Food with climate advocate Thomas Kostigen providing guidance on making climate-friendly food choices.

== Personal life ==
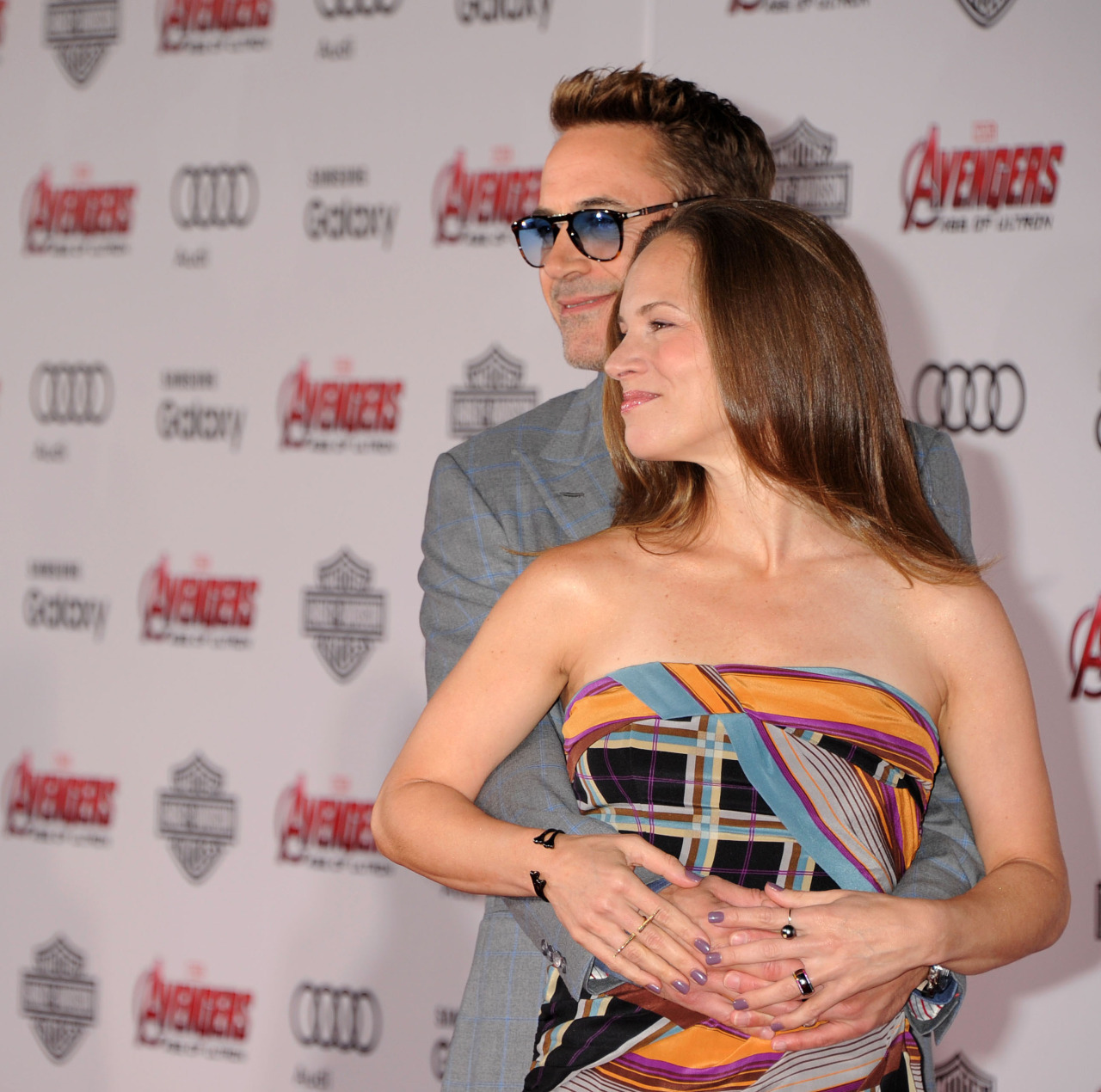
Downey and Levin at the premiere of Avengers: Age of Ultron (2015)

Downey started dating actress Sarah Jessica Parker in 1984 after meeting her on the set of Firstborn. Their relationship ended in 1991, largely due to Downey's drug addiction. On May 29, 1992, he married singer and actress Deborah Falconer following a six-week courtship. Falconer gave birth to their only son in September 1993. Downey's repeated stints in rehab and jail placed significant strain on their marriage. Falconer left him in 1996 and filed for divorce in early 2001, citing "irreconcilable differences". The divorce was finalized in 2004, and Falconer received custody of their son.

In 2003, Downey met producer Susan Levin, then the executive vice president of production at Silver Pictures, while filming Gothika. Although Levin was initially hesitant about the relationship, the two began dating during production and remained together after filming ended. Downey proposed the night before her thirtieth birthday, and they married on August 27, 2005, in a Jewish ceremony in Amagansett, New York. The couple have two children together, a son born in February 2012 and a daughter born in November 2014. In December 2000, Downey's stepmother, Rosemary, told author People that Downey had been diagnosed with bipolar disorder "a few years ago", adding that this was "the reason he ha[d] a hard time staying sober".

According to the actor, he has remained drug-free since July 2003 and credits Levin with helping him overcome his drug and alcohol habits, along with his family, therapy, meditation, twelve-step recovery programs, yoga, and the practice of Wing Chun kung fu. In December 2015, he was among 91 individuals pardoned by California governor Jerry Brown for prior drug offenses. (Note: The pardon did not erase his criminal record; it restored his eligibility for jury service.) In 2014, Downey described his religious beliefs as "Jewish Buddhist". Earlier in his life, he had also explored Christianity and the Hare Krishna movement. After initially adopting a vegan diet to address concerns about the climate crisis, Downey revealed in 2024 that he had transitioned to a pescetarian diet after experiencing low levels of vitamin B12, calcium, and iron.

== Artistry and public image ==
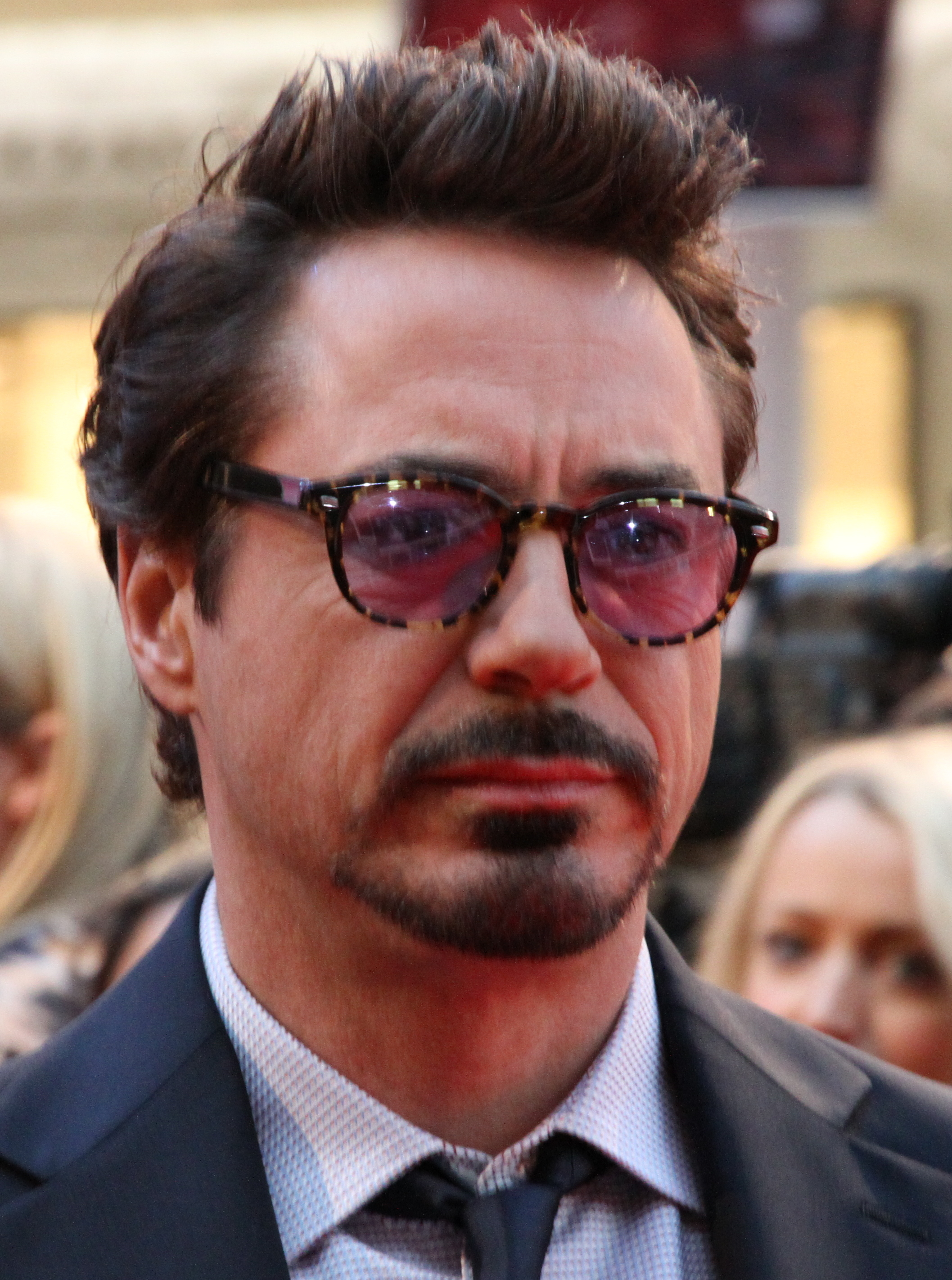
Downey at The Avengers film premiere in London in 2012

Downey is known for his versatility when selecting roles and often stars in drama, comedy, and action films. He typically plays characters who are intelligent, charismatic, complicated, and often flawed, with Roger Ebert observing that his most common screen personas are "irreverent, quirky, self-deprecating, wise-cracking". Critics have noted his ability to fully embody a role, making the character seem real. Early in his career, Downey's acting style differed from many of his contemporaries, as Rolling Stone's Lynn Hirschberg noted, describing it as "not brooding or intolerably self-absorbed" but in "a semiconstant state of amusement". Analyzing his roles in Mussolini (1985) and Less than Zero (1987), Stephen Schiff wrote in Vanity Fair that Downey managed to "shrug and bubble his way past every obstacle".

Downey has described himself as an "incredibly gifted faker" who knows "very little about acting". His preparation for specific roles has included intensive rehearsal and character immersion, such as spending months training with experts to perfectly mimic Chaplin's movements in Chaplin (1992), and remaining in character off-set to prepare for his portrayal of Kirk Lazarus in Tropic Thunder (2008). In 2010, Walter Kirn, writing for Rolling Stone, stated that Downey "refuses to follow any kind of script, never quite coming into focus, always in thrall to another idea", which the journalist described as the "essence of [Downey's] mind and spirit, and, arguably, of his genius as an actor". Downey has described his approach to acting as intuitive and improvisational rather than methodical, stating that "the goal is to make a well-written scene seem like it's improvised" and "try to improve things as you go along".

Downey's films as a leading actor have grossed over $14.3 billion worldwide, making him the fourth-highest-grossing actor of all time, according to The Numbers. Forbes named Downey highest-paid actor in the world in 2013, 2014, and 2015, with earnings of $75 million in the first two years and $80 million in 2015. The publication has included him in its annual Celebrity 100 list, which ranks the most powerful people in the world, placing him twentieth in 2013 and tenth in 2014. Time magazine featured him on its list of the 100 most influential people in the world in 2008. In 2025, The Independent named Downey the forty-fourth-greatest film actor of the 21st century.

== Acting credits and accolades ==
According to Rotten Tomatoes, Downey's most critically acclaimed films include "Sr.", True Believer, Richard III, Short Cuts, Avengers: Endgame, Iron Man, Oppenheimer, Good Night, and Good Luck, Spider-Man: Homecoming, and The Avengers. (Note: This list, as of November 2025, ranks his ten highest-rated films from the top to the bottom.) His accolades include an Academy Award, three Actor Awards, two BAFTAs, three Golden Globe Awards, and a Daytime Emmy Award, as well as nominations for two Primetime Emmy Awards.

== Discography ==
=== Studio albums ===
List of studio albums, with year released and selected chart positions
Title	Details	Peak chart positions	
Title	Details	US	UK
The Futurist	Released: November 23, 2004; Label: Sony Classical; Formats: CD, digital download	121	56
"—" denotes items which did not chart in that territory.

=== Singles ===
List of singles, with year released, selected chart positions, and album
Title	Year	Peak chart positions	Album
Title	Year	UK	Album
"Smile"	1993	68	Chaplin and The Futurist
"Broken / Man Like Me"	2004	—	The Futurist
"—" denotes items which did not chart in that country.

=== Soundtrack appearances ===
List of soundtrack appearances, with year released and soundtrack
Title	Year	Soundtrack	Ref.
"Smile"	1992	Chaplin	
"The Star-Spangled Banner" (with B. B. King)	1993	Heart and Souls	
"White Christmas" (with Vonda Shepard)	2000	Ally McBeal: A Very Ally Christmas	
"River"	2000	Ally McBeal: A Very Ally Christmas	
"Every Breath You Take" (with Sting)	2001	Ally McBeal: For Once in My Life Featuring Vonda Shepard	
"Chances Are" (with Vonda Shepard)	2001	Ally McBeal: For Once in My Life Featuring Vonda Shepard	
"Snakes"	2001	Ally McBeal: For Once in My Life Featuring Vonda Shepard	
"In My Dreams"	2003	The Singing Detective	
"Broken"	2005	Kiss Kiss Bang Bang	

== Printed sources ==
- Bystedt, Karen (1988). The New Breed. McFarland & Company. ISBN 978-0-8050-0774-9.
- Darowski, Joseph J. (2015). The Ages of Iron Man. McFarland & Company. ISBN 978-1-4766-2074-9.
- Duchovnay, Gerald (2012). Film Voices. State University of New York Press. ISBN 978-0-7914-8475-3.
- Ellcessor, Elizabeth; Kirkpatrick, Bill; Kirkpatrick, Milton William (2017). Disability Media Studies. NYU Press. ISBN 978-1-4798-4938-3.
- Falk, Ben (2014). Robert Downey Jr. HarperCollins. ISBN 978-1-910232-12-5.
- Gates Jr., H. L. (2014). Finding Your Roots. University of North Carolina Press. ISBN 978-1-4696-1801-2.
- Hennig-Thurau, Thorsten; Houston, Mark B. (2018). Entertainment Science. Springer Publishing. ISBN 978-3-319-89292-4.
- MacDonald, Erin E. (2014). Robert Downey Jr. from Brat to Icon. McFarland & Company. ISBN 978-0-7864-7549-0.
- Payne, Brian K.; Gainey, Randy R. (2014). Family Violence and Criminal Justice. Routledge. ISBN 978-1-317-52258-4.
- Welsh, James M.; Whaley, Donald M. (2012). The Oliver Stone Encyclopedia. Bloomsbury Publishing. ISBN 978-0-8108-8353-6.
