= Kiss Kiss Bang Bang =

2005 crime-comedy film directed by Shane Black

- Theatrical release poster
- Directed by: Shane Black
- Screenplay by: Shane Black
- Story by: Shane Black
- Based on: Bodies Are Where You Find Them by Brett Halliday
- Produced by: Joel Silver
- Starring: Robert Downey Jr.; Val Kilmer; Michelle Monaghan; Corbin Bernsen
- Cinematography: Michael Barrett
- Edited by: Jim Page
- Music by: John Ottman
- Production company: Silver Pictures
- Distributed by: Warner Bros. Pictures
- Release dates: May 14, 2005 (Cannes); October 21, 2005 (United States)
- Running time: 102 minutes
- Country: United States
- Language: English
- Budget: $15 million
- Box office: $15.8 million

Kiss Kiss Bang Bang is a 2005 American neo-noir black comedy crime film written and directed by Shane Black (in his directorial debut) and starring Robert Downey Jr., Val Kilmer, Michelle Monaghan, and Corbin Bernsen. The script is partially based on the Brett Halliday novel Bodies Are Where You Find Them (1941) and interprets the classic hardboiled literary genre in a tongue-in-cheek fashion. The film was produced by Joel Silver, with Susan Levin and Steve Richards as executive producers.

Shot in Los Angeles between February 24 and May 3, 2004, the film debuted at the 2005 Cannes Film Festival on May 14, 2005, and was released in the United States on October 21, 2005. It received positive reviews from critics and grossed approximately $16 million worldwide.

== Plot ==
While fleeing from a burglary gone south, Harry Lockhart stumbles into an ongoing audition in New York City. As he pretends to be an actor in order to evade the police, he has an emotional breakdown over his remorse. Casting director Dabney Shaw mistakes this for method acting and sends him to Los Angeles for screen testing.

At a party in L.A., Harry meets his childhood crush Harmony Lane and "Gay" Perry van Shrike, a private detective hired to give him on-the-job tutelage for his screen test. The party is hosted by Harlan Dexter, a retired actor who has recently resolved a feud over his wife's inheritance with his estranged daughter, Veronica.

During a stakeout at a Big Bear Lake cabin, Harry and Perry witness two men dump a car in the lake. Noticing a female body in the trunk, Perry shoots the lock in a rescue attempt but accidentally hits the corpse. Because of this, they decide against reporting the incident, as it would appear Perry killed her. When Harry returns to his hotel room, Harmony shows up and tells him of her sister, Jenna; she supposedly killed herself, but Harmony is convinced it was murder. Due to his connection to Perry, Harmony mistakenly thinks Harry is a detective and asks him to investigate. After Harmony leaves, Harry finds the corpse from the lake in his bathroom, so he calls Perry and the two of them dispose of it at the side of the road.

The following morning, Harmony tells Harry about how Jenna was sexually abused by their father when they were young, and that Harmony helped her cope with it by falsely suggesting she was adopted. Later, the body from the lake is identified as Veronica Dexter, from which Perry concludes that the killers were at the party and convinces Harry to leave L.A., as his life may be in danger. At the airport, Harry talks to one of Harmony's friends and realizes that Jenna was the person who hired Perry to do the stakeout at Big Bear Lake in the first place. Harry, Perry and Harmony reunite at a party and find out that Jenna had come to L.A. in search of her biological father and mistakenly thought it was Harlan Dexter.

After the party, Harry is beaten up by the two thugs from the lake. Harmony starts to drive him to the hospital, but on the way she notices a pink-haired woman whom Perry was hired to follow. Realizing this was a trap for Perry, she abandons an unconscious Harry in the car to warn him. One of the thugs is killed in an ensuing shootout, and the frightened pink-haired woman steals Harmony's car, unwittingly driving Harry to her home. There, the other thug kills the pink-haired woman, and Harry kills him in retaliation. Back at his hotel, Harry confesses to Harmony that he is a small-time burglar; she, in turn, confesses that she slept with his best friend in high school, which angers Harry, and he throws her out.

The next day, Perry awakens Harry because Harmony left Perry a voicemail about the case before apparently disappearing. Harry and Perry investigate a mental hospital owned by Harlan Dexter and discover that Veronica was locked in there; they deduce that Harlan must have hired Jenna to act as her replacement to end the inheritance feud, then had both girls killed once he got the money. They also get a call from Harmony, who is alive and well, right as Harlan and his henchmen capture the two of them. While Harry and Perry escape, Harmony steals the van used to transport Veronica's body to the crematorium. A violent car chase ensues on the highways of L.A., during which Harry manages to kill Harlan and his lackeys, but not before both he and Perry are critically wounded as well.

Harry wakes up in the hospital to find Perry alive, and together with Harmony they learn the truth. Harlan never actually met Jenna; the replacement for Veronica was another woman who, when not impersonating her, wore a pink wig. While stalking Harlan, Jenna must have seen him in bed with "Veronica", and become devastated to find the man she believed to be her biological father engaged in incest. She hired Perry to expose Harlan, then took her own life. At Jenna's funeral, Perry confronts her bedridden father and tells him he was the one who truly murdered her. Harry leaves behind his life as a burglar and settles in L.A. to work as Perry's assistant.

== Cast ==
- Robert Downey Jr. as Harold "Harry" Lockhart
  - Indio Falconer Downey as young Harry
  - Richard Alan Brown as teen Harry
- Val Kilmer as "Gay" Perry van Shrike
- Michelle Monaghan as Harmony Faith Lane
  - Ariel Winter as young Harmony
  - Stephanie Pearson as teen Harmony
- Corbin Bernsen as Harlan Dexter
- Dash Mihok as Mr. Frying Pan
- Larry Miller as Dabney Shaw
- Rockmond Dunbar as Mr. Fire
- Shannyn Sossamon as Mia Frye (Pink Hair Girl)
- Angela Lindvall as Flicka
- Daniel Browning Smith as Rubber Boy
- Laurence Fishburne as Bear in Genaros Beer Commercial (uncredited)

== Production ==
Following the poor box office of The Long Kiss Goodnight and a rejection letter from the Academy of Motion Picture Arts and Sciences, Shane Black decided he would attempt something out of the action genre. Following the example of James L. Brooks, Black attempted to make a romantic comedy, "a quirky story of two kids in L.A." Brooks liked Black's first draft, but felt his later attempts were losing focus. Trying to salvage what he had liked, Brooks suggested Black imagine Jack Nicholson from As Good as It Gets playing Nicholson's role from Chinatown. This led Black to add action elements — "I said, you know, 'Fuck it. I have to put a murder in it'" — and re-work the screenplay, adding the character of detective "Gay" Perry, who Black said was an attempt to break stereotypes, as he had never seen "the gay guy who kicks down the door, shoots everyone, and bails your ass out before". Old detective novels were a major influence, with Black saying he tried to re-invent the genre "using realistic characters, in a modern setting, but with the spirit of the 1950s and 1960s". The crime plot drew from Brett Halliday's Bodies Are Where You Find Them, and Black homaged Raymond Chandler by splitting the film into chapters named after Chandler's books ("Trouble Is My Business", "The Lady in the Lake", "The Little Sister", "The Simple Art of Murder", and for the epilogue: "Farewell, My Lovely").

The script, then titled You'll Never Die in This Town Again, was rejected by various studios before Joel Silver, who gave Black his first break producing Lethal Weapon and The Last Boy Scout, decided to produce it. The leading role of the film, now retitled L.A.P.I., had been considered for Benicio del Toro, Hugh Grant and Johnny Knoxville. Robert Downey Jr. learned about the film from his then-girlfriend Susan Levin, who worked as Silver's assistant, and as he finished working with Silver in Gothika, the producer and Black brought him in to audition. Downey was eventually cast as they liked his readings and knew he could fit into the small $15 million budget, as his career had been in a downfall following his time in prison. Levin also suggested bringing in Val Kilmer, who coincidentally had been long interested in making a comedy.

Before principal photography began, the title became Kiss Kiss Bang Bang because Black felt it was a "blunt and austere title" that described how the plot was "half romantic comedy and half murder mystery". To achieve a neo-noir look, Black screened 1960s films of the genre, such as Harper and Point Blank, to cinematographer Michael Barrett and production designer Aaron Osborne. Osborne, in particular drew inspiration from the detective book covers by illustrator Robert McGinnis, who was also brought in to draw the covers for the fictional Johnny Gossamer novels that appear in the film. The Hollywood party that opens the film was filmed in Black's own Los Angeles mansion.

== Release ==
Kiss Kiss Bang Bang was screened out of competition at the 2005 Cannes Film Festival. The film premiered at the Chinese Theatre on October 17, 2005, as the opener of the Hollywood Film Festival. Kiss Kiss Bang Bang was released on DVD on June 13, 2006.

=== Box office ===
The film opened in limited release in 8 theaters on October 21 in the United States, grossing $180,660 in its opening weekend. From its release until mid-November, the film's distribution was expanded every weekend due to its favorable critical reviews. It stayed in release in the United States until early January. Kiss Kiss Bang Bang grossed a total of $4,243,756 in the United States and Canada. It grossed far more outside the United States, accounting for just over 70% of the film's worldwide gross, accumulating $11,541,392. The film ended up grossing $15,785,148 worldwide, earning back its budget. Downey was disappointed at the low box office intake, but said Kiss Kiss Bang Bang "ended up being my calling card to Iron Man", as his performance got the interest of director Jon Favreau. Iron Man would mark Downey's career resurrection, and Black was even brought in to co-write and direct the sequel Iron Man 3.

=== Critical response ===
On Rotten Tomatoes, the film has an approval rating of 86%, based on 180 reviews, and an average rating of 7.50/10. The website's critical consensus reads: "Tongue-in-cheek satire blends well with entertaining action and spot-on performances in this dark, eclectic neo-noir homage." On Metacritic, the film has a weighted average score 72 out of 100, based on 37 critic reviews, indicating "generally favorable" reviews.

Mike Russell of The Oregonian observed that "This is one of Downey's most enjoyable performances, and one of Kilmer's funniest. It's a relationship comedy wrapped in sharp talk and gunplay, a triumphant comeback for Black, and one of the year's best movies". IGN critic Jeff Otto wrote, "It takes a bunch of genres and twists them into a blender, a pop relic that still feels current ... one of the best times I've had at the movies this year." Kirk Honeycutt of The Hollywood Reporter praised the lead performances, saying "Downey and Monaghan are wonderful at playing characters that compensate for the harshness of their past with flippant swaggers." Todd McCarthy of Variety wrote, "Once again making a diverting but insubstantial movie look better than it is, Downey, with haggard charm to burn, is winning all the way. Kilmer is riotous at times as an impeccably groomed, businesslike guy keen to assert his orientation at every opportunity."

Roger Ebert of the Chicago Sun-Times gave the film two and a half stars out of 4. Ebert opined the film "contains a lot of comedy and invention, but doesn't much benefit from its clever style. The characters and plot are so promising that maybe Black should have backed off and told the story deadpan, instead of mugging so shamelessly for laughs."

== Accolades ==
Kiss Kiss Bang Bang was named "Overlooked Film of the Year" by the 2005 Phoenix Film Critics Society. In 2006, Empire magazine named it "Best Thriller".

== Soundtrack ==
The soundtrack to Kiss Kiss Bang Bang with music by John Ottman was released on October 18, 2005.

No.	Title	Length
1.	"The Fair"	1:38
2.	"Main Titles"	1:53
3.	"Innocent Times"	2:02
4.	"Toy Heist"	1:55
5.	"Lovely Confessions"	2:30
6.	"Surveillance Lesson"	3:22
7.	"Harry Smartens Up"	1:48
8.	"Dead Girl in Shower"	3:49
9.	"Harmony Is Dead?"	1:25
10.	"Saving Perry"	4:40
11.	"Flashback / Dropping Off Body"	2:38
12.	"They Took My Crickets"	1:48
13.	"Oh, Nuts!"	2:56
14.	"Whoa, Who's This?"	1:38
15.	"Harmony Lives"	2:16
16.	"Doggie Treat / First Kill"	2:09
17.	"Going Home"	1:47
18.	"Harmony Sees a Clue"	1:24
19.	"Harry's Rage"	3:23
20.	"Painful Pieces"	1:27
21.	"That's the Story"	2:46
22.	"Broken" (featuring Robert Downey Jr.)	5:10
Total length:		54:35
