= Gothika =

2003 film directed by Mathieu Kassovitz

- Theatrical release poster
- Directed by: Mathieu Kassovitz
- Screenplay by: Sebastian Gutierrez
- Produced by: Joel Silver; Robert Zemeckis; Susan Levin
- Starring: Halle Berry; Robert Downey Jr.; Penélope Cruz; Charles S. Dutton; John Carroll Lynch; Bernard Hill
- Cinematography: Matthew Libatique
- Edited by: Yannick Kergoat
- Music by: John Ottman
- Production companies: Dark Castle Entertainment; Warner Bros. Pictures; Columbia Pictures
- Distributed by: Warner Bros. Pictures (North America/Japan); Columbia TriStar Film Distributors International (International)
- Release date: November 21, 2003 (United States)
- Running time: 98 minutes
- Country: United States
- Language: English
- Budget: $40 million
- Box office: $141.6 million

Gothika is a 2003 American psychological horror film directed by Mathieu Kassovitz and written by Sebastian Gutierrez. It stars Halle Berry, Robert Downey Jr., Penélope Cruz, Charles S. Dutton, John Carroll Lynch, and Bernard Hill. The film follows a psychiatrist (Berry) who finds herself incarcerated in the penitentiary in which she works, accused of brutally murdering her husband (Dutton).

It was produced by Joel Silver, Robert Zemeckis, and Susan Levin, with Don Carmody, Steve Richards, and Gary Ungar serving as executive producers. The fourth project developed by production company Dark Castle Entertainment, following Ghost Ship (2002), Gothika was the second film by the company to be co-distributed by Warner Bros. Pictures and Columbia Pictures, the first being Thirteen Ghosts (2001). It was also Dark Castle's first major scale production and the first to boast a number of high-profile stars in its lead roles.

Gothika was theatrically released in the United States on November 21, 2003, the Friday before Thanksgiving. The film received generally negative reviews from critics but was a box office success, grossing $141.6 million worldwide.

== Plot ==
Dr. Miranda Grey, a psychiatrist at Woodward Penitentiary in rural western Connecticut, crashes her car one night on a country road to avoid hitting a young woman. When she awakens, she finds herself an inmate of the women's ward in which she works, receiving treatment from her colleague, Dr. Pete Graham. Pete reveals that her husband, Douglas, has been the victim of a brutal axe murder, and she is the sole suspect. As Miranda attempts to adjust to life as an inmate, she is haunted by visions of the young woman she saw the night of the car accident, and is attacked by her apparition; the woman carves the phrase "Not Alone" into Miranda's arm, though hospital staff presume she is self-harming.

Miranda bonds with fellow inmate Chloe Sava, whom she treated before her incarceration. One night, she witnesses Chloe being raped and glimpses a tattoo of an Anima Sola on the perpetrator's chest, though the guards do not believe her. As time passes, she regains memories of the car accident. She identifies the mysterious woman as Rachel, the daughter of her superior, Dr. Phil Parsons, who had died in an apparent suicide several years prior. Late one night, Miranda is attacked by Rachel's ghost and escapes the hospital. She returns to her home and observes the crime scene. This triggers vivid memories of Miranda committing Douglas's murder.

Miranda visits Douglas' rural farmhouse in Rhode Island, hoping it will contain clues. In a cellar in the barn, she finds a blood-stained mattress, along with sedatives, restraints, and video recording equipment. One of the tapes is revealed to be a snuff film shot by Douglas, which shows him raping, torturing, and murdering a young woman. Police arrive, arresting Miranda and finding one of Douglas's victims, Tracey Seaver, still alive in the barn. Miranda realizes that Rachel possessed her to carry out the act and avenge Rachel's own murder by Douglas.

Incarcerated in the county jail, Miranda speaks to Sheriff Bob Ryan, Douglas' best friend, about her belief that Rachel's suicide was staged and a second perpetrator was involved. Using her expertise as a psychiatrist, she constructs a psychological profile of the second perpetrator and realizes it is Ryan, who then attempts to inject her with a sedative. In the struggle, she tears at his shirt, revealing the Anima Sola tattoo on his chest. She turns the syringe on Ryan before fleeing. In a drugged state, he pursues her, telling her that Rachel wasn't their first victim, and he and Douglas worked together to abduct, rape, and murder local women. Rachel's apparition appears and Ryan shoots at it, causing an explosion that sets him ablaze. Miranda shoots the burned Ryan to death. Moments later, Pete arrives to save her, having realized the truth.

A year later, Miranda, now freed, walks with Chloe, also released, on a city sidewalk. After Chloe leaves, Miranda sees a young boy on the road who is about to be struck by a fire truck. However, the fire truck passes right through him and she realizes he is only a ghost, failing to notice the "Missing" flyer of the boy.

== Cast ==
- Halle Berry as Dr. Miranda Grey
- Robert Downey Jr. as Dr. Pete Graham
- Penélope Cruz as Chloe Sava
- Charles S. Dutton as Dr. Douglas Grey
- John Carroll Lynch as Sheriff Bob Ryan
- Bernard Hill as Phil Parsons
- Dorian Harewood as Teddy Howard
- Bronwen Mantel as Irene
- Kathleen Mackey as Rachel Parsons
- Matthew G. Taylor as Turlington
- Michel Perron as Joe
- Andrea Sheldon as Tracey Seaver

== Production ==
=== Development ===
The fourth feature film produced by Dark Castle Entertainment, Gothika was the first to boast a high-profile leading cast, and was the company's largest-scale production at the time, with a budget of approximately $40 million.

=== Casting ===
Berry was partly inspired to take the role because her mother, a nurse, worked in a psychiatric hospital for decades.

=== Filming ===
Filming took place on-location in Quebec, Canada in the spring of 2003. The film was largely shot at the abandoned St. Vincent-de-Paul Prison in Laval. Other scenes were filmed throughout Montreal, Hinchinbrooke, Oka, and Saint-Jean-sur-Richelieu.

Shooting of Berry's sequences was temporarily halted for several weeks in May 2003, after Robert Downey Jr., while filming a tense scene with Berry, grabbed and twisted her arm, accidentally breaking it.

== Soundtrack ==
The score's original music was composed by John Ottman, with additional cues by Lior Rosner. "Behind Blue Eyes" by Limp Bizkit (originally by The Who) was featured in the film but was not available on the soundtrack. The record was released on November 18, 2003, via Varèse Sarabande.

== Release ==
Gothika was released on November 21, 2003 in North America, opening the Friday before the Thanksgiving week in the United States.

=== Home media ===
Gothika was released on VHS and DVD by Warner Home Video on March 2, 2004. The initial DVD release was available in both widescreen and fullscreen editions. A two-disc special edition DVD, featuring additional documentaries and bonus features, was subsequently released in October 2004. The film was released on Blu-ray by Warner Bros. on September 25, 2007.

== Reception ==
=== Box office ===
Gothika grossed $19.3 million in its opening weekend, ranking at #2 behind The Cat in the Hat. It went on to gross $59.7 million in the US and $81.9 million from foreign markets for a worldwide total of $141.6 million.

=== Critical response ===
The review aggregator site Rotten Tomatoes gave Gothika a 15% approval rating based on 165 reviews and an average rating of 4.1/10. The site's critical consensus reads, "Berry's acting talents can't save Gothika from its preposterous plot and bad dialogue." On Metacritic, the film has a score of 38 out of 100 based on 36 critics, indicating "generally unfavorable reviews". Audiences polled by CinemaScore gave the film an average grade of "B" on an A+ to F scale.

A more positive review came from Roger Ebert of The Chicago Sun-Times, who gave the film 3 out of 4 stars. He wrote that "the plot is preposterous" but nonetheless felt that stylish direction and Berry's performance made Gothika enjoyable on its own "lurid" terms: "The casting of Halle Berry is useful to the movie because she evokes a vulnerable quality that triggers our concern. Hitchcock might have wanted to work with her. He didn't cast so much for acting ability as for an innate quality."

A. O. Scott of The New York Times praised the film's atmosphere and cinematography, but felt the screenplay was inconsistent, noting that "ghost-story clichés collide with the serial-killer clichés, and the women-behind-bars clichés give way to the wronged-women-seeking revenge clichés, the movie proves to be both too much and not enough: yet another slick, empty package of ersatz entertainment." Adam Smith of Empire awarded the film two out of five stars, writing: "Sebastian Gutierrez's over-cooked screenplay provides director Kassovitz with more than enough trope to hang himself, serving up every cliche from endless thunderstorms and creepy asylums to flickering strip-lights and that 'spooky' backwards sound effect that no hackneyed horror these days is ever without, before applying the tin lid with a 'twist' ending more carefully signposted than wet floors in an orthopaedic ward."

=== Awards and nominations ===
Institution	Year	Category	Nominee	Result	Ref.
Black Reel Awards	2004	Outstanding Actress	Halle Berry	Nominated	
Golden Trailer Awards	2004	Best Horror/Thriller	Gothika	Nominated	
MTV Movie Awards	2004	Best Female Performance	Halle Berry	Nominated	
NAACP Image Awards	2004	Outstanding Actress in a Motion Picture	Halle Berry	Nominated	
NAACP Image Awards	2004	Outstanding Actor in a Motion Picture	Charles S. Dutton	Nominated	
Teen Choice Awards	2004	Choice Movie Actress – Drama/Action Adventure	Halle Berry	Won	
Teen Choice Awards	2004	Choice Movie – Thriller	Gothika	Nominated	

== See also ==
- List of ghost films
