= The Judge (2014 film) =

2014 film by David Dobkin

- Theatrical release poster
- Directed by: David Dobkin
- Screenplay by: Nick Schenk; Bill Dubuque
- Story by: Nick Schenk; David Dobkin
- Produced by: Susan Downey; David Gambino; David Dobkin
- Starring: Robert Downey Jr.; Robert Duvall; Vera Farmiga; Vincent D'Onofrio; Jeremy Strong; Dax Shepard; Billy Bob Thornton
- Cinematography: Janusz Kamiński
- Edited by: Mark Livolsi
- Music by: Thomas Newman
- Production companies: Village Roadshow Pictures; RatPac-Dune Entertainment; Team Downey; Big Kid Pictures
- Distributed by: Warner Bros. Pictures
- Release dates: September 4, 2014 (TIFF); October 10, 2014 (United States)
- Running time: 141 minutes
- Country: United States
- Language: English
- Budget: $45–50 million
- Box office: $84.4 million

The Judge is a 2014 American legal drama film directed by David Dobkin. The film stars Robert Downey Jr. and Robert Duvall with Vera Farmiga, Vincent D'Onofrio, Jeremy Strong, Dax Shepard and Billy Bob Thornton in supporting roles.

The film was released in the United States on October 10, 2014 by Warner Bros. Pictures. It received mixed reviews from critics, but was praised for the performances of Duvall and Downey and Thomas Newman's score. The film grossed $84.4 million against a $45–50 million budget. Duvall received multiple award nominations for his performance as Judge Joseph Palmer, including the Academy Award, Golden Globe Award, Screen Actors Guild Award and Satellite Award for Best Supporting Actor. Thomas Newman received a Satellite Award nomination for Best Original Score.

== Plot ==
Hank Palmer is a trial lawyer in Chicago, acerbic and notorious for defending powerful clients he knows to be guilty. Before returning to his rural hometown of Carlinville, Indiana to attend his mother's funeral, he argues with his wife, Lisa, whom he is divorcing for infidelity.

In Carlinville, Hank reunites with his older brother Glen, a tire shop owner, and his younger brother Dale, an intellectually disabled amateur filmmaker. Hank's father is Judge Joseph Palmer of Carlinville's criminal court, whom he calls "Judge". The two have been estranged due to the Judge's harsh treatment of Hank in his youth: When Hank was a teenager, he got into a car accident and Glen was injured, losing a chance for a baseball career. Because of this, the Judge had Hank sent to juvenile detention.

Hank stops by the courthouse to watch his father preside over a case. During the proceedings, the Judge is unable to recall his long-time bailiff's name. The morning after the funeral, Hank notices that the Judge's Cadillac is damaged and accuses his father, a recovered alcoholic, of driving intoxicated. The Judge reacts defensively, having no memory of an accident. They argue and Hank leaves for the airport, vowing never to return to Carlinville. Just before his flight is to take off, Glen calls to say that their father is a suspect in a fatal hit-and-run incident. The victim, Mark Blackwell, was a recently released ex-convict whom the Judge had sentenced to 20 years in prison for the murder of his 16-year-old girlfriend; Blackwell had killed her by drowning after the Judge had given him a light sentence of 30 days for shooting up the girl's house.

The Judge is indicted after police forensics confirm that Blackwell's blood is on his car. Given his personal history with the victim, he is charged with first-degree murder. The Judge initially rejects Hank's legal help, but when his hired local attorney proves ineffective at the preliminary hearing, he allows Hank to take over as lead counsel. While preparing for trial, Hank learns that his father is secretly undergoing chemotherapy for terminal cancer, which has affected his mental acuity for months. Hank wants to use this information in his father's defense (citing diminished responsibility), but fearing it will compromise his past adjudications and tarnish his legacy, the Judge refuses, frustrating Hank. During his prolonged stay, Hank and his father continue to get into personal clashes. Hank's strained family relationship is further complicated by his former girlfriend, Sam Powell, who owns the local diner. He comes to believe that he may be the father of Sam's daughter Carla, a law student. During this time, Hank's own daughter Lauren arrives for a visit, meeting her grandfather for the first time and bonding with him.

After a medical emergency puts him in the hospital, the Judge insists on testifying at the trial. During cross-examination he scuttles his defense by saying that he cannot remember the hit-and-run but believes he may have killed Blackwell intentionally, shocking the court. Taking over on redirect, Hank pushes the Judge until he admits to his terminal cancer treatment; the Judge further reveals that Blackwell had insulted his late wife on the fateful night, and that he gave Blackwell a light sentence for his first offense because Blackwell's circumstances had reminded the Judge of Hank. Hank closes by demonstrating that, as before, the Judge cannot remember his own bailiff's name. As they await the jury's verdict, Sam informs Hank that his brother Glen is Carla's father but does not know; Sam slept with him after Hank left town twenty years before. Hank is angered by the revelation, but the two reaffirm their love for each other and embrace. When the court reconvenes, the Judge is acquitted of first-degree murder but convicted of voluntary manslaughter and sentenced to four years in the Indiana State Prison.

Seven months later, Hank returns as his father has been granted a compassionate release, requested by the prosecutor, to allow him to die at home. Fishing on a lake, Hank and the Judge appear to have buried their mutual animosity. After praising Hank as a lawyer, the Judge peacefully dies on the boat. The courthouse flag is flown at half-staff to honor him. Hank visits the courthouse and spins his father's chair; it stops, facing him.

== Cast ==
- Robert Downey Jr. as Henry "Hank" Palmer, a Chicago lawyer
- Robert Duvall as Judge Joseph Palmer, Hank's father
- Vera Farmiga as Samantha Powell, Hank's ex-girlfriend and owner of the local diner
- Vincent D'Onofrio as Glen Palmer, Hank's older brother and the proprietor of the local tire shop
- Jeremy Strong as Dale Palmer, Hank's mentally challenged younger brother
- Dax Shepard as Attorney C.P. Kennedy
- Leighton Meester as Carla Powell, Samantha's daughter
- Billy Bob Thornton as Dwight Dickham, the Prosecutor
- Ken Howard as Judge Warren
- Emma Tremblay as Lauren Palmer, Hank's daughter
- Balthazar Getty as Deputy Hanson
- David Krumholtz as Mike Kattan
- Grace Zabriskie as Mrs. Blackwell
- Denis O'Hare as Doc Morris
- Sarah Lancaster as Lisa Palmer, Hank's wife
- Daryl Edwards as Judge Carter

== Production ==
=== Development ===
The script was originally written by Nick Schenk. In March 2011, the script was to be rewritten by David Seidler. In April 2013, Bill Dubuque was enlisted to rewrite it. The casting of Robert Duvall, Vincent D'Onofrio, Vera Farmiga, and Dax Shepard was reported in March 2013. The studios had expressed an interest in Jack Nicholson playing Joseph, but Nicholson turned down the role and it was given to Duvall. Duvall was initially hesitant to star in the film due to the explicit and emotionally tested scenes, but he was convinced to join after a second meeting. Leighton Meester joined the cast in April 2013.

=== Filming ===
Principal photography started on May 31, 2013, in Shelburne Falls, Massachusetts. Shooting also took place in Attleboro, Belmont, Dedham, Milton, Sunderland, and Waltham, Massachusetts. Scenes were also filmed in Worcester, Massachusetts, including Worcester Regional Airport, as well as locations in Pennsylvania. The film is set in the fictional town of Carlinville, Indiana.

=== Music ===
On February 27, 2014, Thomas Newman was hired to compose the music for the film. WaterTower Music released a soundtrack album on October 7, 2014. The film's closing titles feature Willie Nelson's version of the Coldplay song "The Scientist", and Bon Iver's song "Holocene" is also featured prominently in the film.

== Release ==
The film was shown at the opening night of the 2014 Toronto International Film Festival on September 4, 2014. It was premiered in Los Angeles on October 1, 2014, at the Beverly Hills' Academy of Motion Picture Arts and Sciences. The film was released on October 10, 2014, in the United States. and was released on DVD and Blu-ray on January 27, 2015.

=== Box office ===
The Judge grossed $13.1 million in its opening weekend in the United States and Canada, where it went on to earn $47.1 million, adding $37.3 million in other territories, for a worldwide total of $84.4 million, against a budget of $45–$50 million.

=== Critical response ===
On the review aggregator website Rotten Tomatoes, 49% of 198 critics' reviews are positive, with an average rating of 5.6/10. The website's consensus reads, "Solidly cast and beautifully filmed but thoroughly clichéd, ''The Judge'' seems destined to preside over a large jurisdiction of the basic cable afternoon-viewing circuit." Metacritic, which uses a weighted average, assigned the film a score of 48 out of 100, based on 39 critics, indicating "mixed or average" reviews.

Film critic Richard Roeper gave the film a "C" rating, saying that it was "surprising how little we care about these characters."

Geoffrey Macnab of The Independent wrote, "For all its contrivances and occasional lapses into On Golden Pond-style mawkishness, this is a richly crafted yarn that boasts barnstorming, if very showy performances from Duvall and Downey Jr." Peter Bradshaw of The Guardian gave a mixed to positive review, writing, "There are plenty of emotional fireworks in this big, soupy but entertaining picture, which is obvious Oscar bait." Entertainment Weekly critic Chris Nashawaty gave the film a "B" rating, and stated, "I don't expect The Judge to usher in a new era of legal thrillers, but I'm happy to see Downey leave the Marvel universe and Baker Street behind."

=== Accolades ===
List of awards and nominations
Year	Award / Film Festival	Category	Recipient(s)	Result
2014	Hollywood Music in Media Awards	Best Original Score – Feature Film	Thomas Newman	Nominated
2014	Mill Valley Film Festival	Best U.S. Feature Film	The Judge (David Dobkin)	2nd Place
2014	Heartland Film Festival	Truly Moving Picture	The Judge (David Dobkin)	Won
2014	18th Hollywood Film Awards	Supporting Actor of the Year	Robert Duvall	Won
2015			Robert Duvall	
2015	87th Academy Awards	Best Supporting Actor	Robert Duvall	Nominated
2015	72nd Golden Globe Awards	Best Supporting Actor – Motion Picture	Robert Duvall	Nominated
2015	21st Screen Actors Guild Awards	Outstanding Performance by a Male Actor in a Supporting Role	Robert Duvall	Nominated
2015	20th Critics' Choice Awards	Best Supporting Actor	Robert Duvall	Nominated
2015	19th Satellite Awards	Best Supporting Actor – Motion Picture	Robert Duvall	Nominated
2015	19th Satellite Awards	Best Original Score	Thomas Newman	Nominated
