= Alfred Fleishman =

- Born: June 16, 1905; St. Louis, Missouri, U.S.
- Died: May 28, 2002 (aged 96); St. Louis, Missouri, U.S.
- Education: St. Louis College of Pharmacy
- Known for: Co-founder of Fleishman–Hillard

Alfred Fleishman (June 16, 1905 – May 28, 2002) was an American businessman renowned for co-founding Fleishman-Hillard alongside his business partner Robert Hillard. Throughout his professional journey, Fleishman became known as a trailblazer in the field of public relations. He was also recognized for his contributions as an author, educator, humanitarian, and advocate for the state of Israel.

== Early life ==
Born on June 16, 1905, in St. Louis, Missouri, Fleishman pursued his education at the St. Louis College of Pharmacy. Following his studies, he served in the U.S. Army, attaining the rank of major in the Army Air Corps during World War II. Throughout the war, he primarily fulfilled the role of a Pentagon-based public information officer.

== Jewish community work ==
Appointed as a special consultant to the Secretary of Defense by the American Jewish Congress, Fleishman embarked on a mission to war-torn Germany in October 1945. There, he led a survey committee tasked with assessing the psychological, economic, and social needs of displaced individuals in Germany and Austria. Fleishman's firsthand experience with the atrocities of the Holocaust positioned him as an early observer. His research and ensuing report played a pivotal role in raising awareness among numerous organizations in the United States regarding the plight of Jews displaced by World War II. After finalizing his report, Fleishman embarked on a lecture tour across 60 cities in the United States. During these engagements, he addressed the topic of relief and rehabilitation needs for refugees, shedding light on their pressing concerns. Following his tour, Fleishman became actively engaged in various Jewish causes and broader minority affairs initiatives. As a dedicated member of the Jewish Agency for Israel, Fleishman undertook 57 visits to Israel spanning from 1955 to 1997. During these visits, he cultivated personal relationships with numerous founders and leaders of the state.

Following his military service, Fleishman received recognition for his contributions to the rehabilitation of World War II combat casualties and amputees. Notably, he was honored with the Legion of Merit award. His achievements included the creation of a widely disseminated publication titled Coming Home. Additionally, he was awarded the Americanism Medal by the Veterans of Foreign Wars.

Fleishman held leadership positions in several Jewish organizations, including serving as a former president of Congregation B'nai Amoona in Creve Coeur, and as a former president and campaign chairman of the Jewish Federation of St. Louis. He was also a co-founder of the St. Louis Jewish Light newspaper.

== Partnership with Hillard ==
Upon returning from Europe in 1946, Fleishman established a business partnership with Robert Hillard. The two had a longstanding acquaintance dating back over a decade to Fleishman's tenure as chief deputy to the city's circuit clerk, while Hillard worked as a reporter for the St. Louis Star-Times. Their firm began in a rented room above a Woolworths store and has since expanded to become one of the world's largest public relations agencies.

Fleishman held the position of the firm's chairman until his retirement in 1975 at the age of 70. In 1996, he and co-founder Hillard were honored with a Lifetime Achievement Award from Inside PR (now known as The Holmes Report).

== General semantics ==
In addition to his contributions to the public relations field, Fleishman made significant contributions to the field of general semantics, authoring three books on the subject: Sense and Nonsense: A Study in Human Communication, Troubled Talk, and Dialogue With Street Fighters. Each of Fleishman's books was recognized as Book of the Year by the International Society of General Semantics. He authored numerous articles on public relations and human communication and delivered lectures extensively on those topics across the country.

== Awards and honors ==
Fleishman garnered various awards and recognition throughout his career. These included the Distinguished Service Medal for Civic Achievement by the United States Junior Chamber of Commerce, the Community Service Award and the Humanitarian Award from the St. Louis Human Development Corporation, and the Community Service Award from the American Jewish Committee.
