= Tropic Thunder =

2008 action comedy film by Ben Stiller

- Theatrical release poster
- Directed by: Ben Stiller
- Screenplay by: Justin Theroux; Ben Stiller; Etan Cohen
- Story by: Ben Stiller; Justin Theroux
- Produced by: Stuart Cornfeld; Ben Stiller; Eric McLeod
- Starring: Ben Stiller; Jack Black; Robert Downey Jr.; Steve Coogan; Jay Baruchel; Danny McBride; Brandon T. Jackson; Bill Hader; Nick Nolte
- Cinematography: John Toll
- Edited by: Greg Hayden
- Music by: Theodore Shapiro
- Production companies: DreamWorks Pictures; Red Hour Productions
- Distributed by: DreamWorks Pictures; Paramount Pictures
- Release date: August 13, 2008
- Running time: 106 minutes
- Countries: United States; Germany; United Kingdom
- Language: English
- Budget: $90–92 million
- Box office: $195.7 million

Tropic Thunder is a 2008 satirical action comedy film directed by Ben Stiller, who wrote the screenplay with Justin Theroux and Etan Cohen. The film stars Stiller, Jack Black, Robert Downey Jr., Jay Baruchel, and Brandon T. Jackson as a group of prima donna actors making a Vietnam War film. When their frustrated director (Steve Coogan) drops them in the middle of a jungle, they are forced to rely on their acting skills to survive the real action and danger. Tropic Thunder parodies many prestigious war films (specifically those based on the Vietnam War), the Hollywood studio system, and method acting. The ensemble cast includes Nick Nolte, Danny McBride, Matthew McConaughey, Bill Hader, and Tom Cruise.

Stiller developed Tropic Thunder's premise during the production of Empire of the Sun in the spring of 1987, and later enlisted Theroux and Cohen to complete a script. The film was greenlit in 2006 and produced by Stuart Cornfeld, Stiller, and Eric McLeod for DreamWorks Pictures and Red Hour Productions as an international co-production between the United States, Germany, and the United Kingdom. Filming took place in 2007 on the Hawaiian island of Kauaʻi over thirteen weeks and was the largest film production in the island's history. The extensive marketing campaign included faux websites for three of the main characters and their fictional films, a fictional television special, and selling the energy drink advertised in the film, "Booty Sweat".

Tropic Thunder was released in the United States on August 13, 2008 by DreamWorks Pictures and Paramount Pictures. It received generally positive reviews for its characters, story, faux trailers, and cast performances, with Downey being the most positively praised for his performance. However, the depiction of people with disabilities and the use of blackface makeup attracted controversy. The film opened at the top of the American box office and retained the number-one position for three consecutive weeks, ultimately grossing more than $195 million worldwide before its release on home media on November 18, 2008. Downey was nominated as Best Supporting Actor for an Academy Award, a BAFTA Award, a Screen Actors Guild Award, and a Critics' Choice Movie Award, while both he and Cruise received nominations for a Golden Globe.

== Plot ==
Tropic Thunder, the memoir of handless Vietnam veteran John "Four Leaf" Tayback, is being made into a film on location in Vietnam. Except for supporting actor Kevin Sandusky, the cast — faded action hero star Tugg Speedman, overbearing five-time Academy Award-winning Australian extreme method actor Kirk Lazarus, closeted gay rapper Alpa Chino, and drug-addicted comedian Jeff Portnoy — all cause problems for the inexperienced director Damien Cockburn, who cannot control them, resulting in a $4 million pyrotechnics scene being wasted. With the project months behind schedule, studio executive Les Grossman gives Damien an ultimatum: get the cast under control, or the project will be canceled.

On Four Leaf's advice, Damien drops the actors into the middle of the jungle, with hidden cameras and rigged special effects explosions to reshoot the film in guerrilla style. The actors have guns that fire blanks, along with a map and scene listing that will lead to a helicopter waiting at the end of the route. Unbeknownst to the actors and production, the group has been dropped in the middle of the Golden Triangle, the home of the heroin-producing Flaming Dragon gang. Just as the group is about to set off, Damien inadvertently steps on an old land mine and is blown up, stunning the actors. Tugg, believing Damien faked his death to encourage the cast to give better performances, assures the others that he is alive and that they are still shooting the film. Kirk is unconvinced but joins them in their trek.

When Four Leaf and pyrotechnics operator Cody Underwood try to locate the deceased director, they are captured by Flaming Dragon guards. Four Leaf is revealed to have hands; he confesses to Underwood that he actually served in the Coast Guard sanitation department, has never left the United States, and that he wrote his "memoir" as a "tribute". As the actors continue through the jungle, Kirk and Kevin discover that Tugg is leading them in the wrong direction. The resulting argument ends with Kirk leading the rest of the cast back toward the resort they were based at, as an increasingly delirious Tugg is captured by the Flaming Dragon guards. Taken to their base, Tugg believes it is a POW camp from the script. He is then brought forward to the gang's boss, the 12-year-old Tran, who discovers that Tugg is the star of their favorite film, the box-office bomb Simple Jack, and forces him to reenact that film several times a day, leaving him brainwashed.

Meanwhile in Los Angeles, Tugg's agent, Rick "Pecker" Peck, confronts Les over an unfulfilled term in Tugg's contract which entitles him to a TiVo. Flaming Dragon calls during the discussion and demands a ransom for Tugg, but Les instead delivers a profanity-laden death threat, believing them at first to be a rival talent agency. Upon realizing his mistake, he decides to abandon Tugg to his death, eager to finally be rid of him and salivating at the prospect of a large life insurance payout. To keep Rick quiet, he gives him the lease to a Gulfstream V jet.

Kirk, Alpa, Jeff, and Kevin discover Flaming Dragon's heroin factory. After witnessing Tugg being tortured, they use the film's script to plan a rescue. Kirk impersonates a farmer towing a "captured" Jeff on the back of a water buffalo, distracting Tran and his guards so Alpa and Kevin can infiltrate and find the prisoners. Kirk's story quickly falls apart after Tran notices inconsistencies. Knowing their cover has been blown, the actors fire off their blanks and manage to fool the guards into surrendering. Jeff grabs Tran and runs off with him to find the gang's heroin supply as the actors' control over his men falls apart.

The four actors locate Four Leaf, Underwood, and Tugg, and cross a bridge rigged to explode, to get to Underwood's helicopter. Tugg initially remains behind, believing Flaming Dragon to be his "family," but runs back screaming, chased by an angry horde of soldiers. Four Leaf destroys the bridge, rescuing Tugg, but as the helicopter takes off, Tran fires an RPG at the helicopter. Rick unexpectedly stumbles out of the jungle and saves them by throwing a TiVo box into the RPG's path. The crew return to Hollywood, and footage from the hidden cameras is compiled into the feature film Tropic Blunder, which becomes a major critical and commercial success. The film wins Tugg his first Academy Award, which Kirk presents to him at the ceremony.

== Cast ==
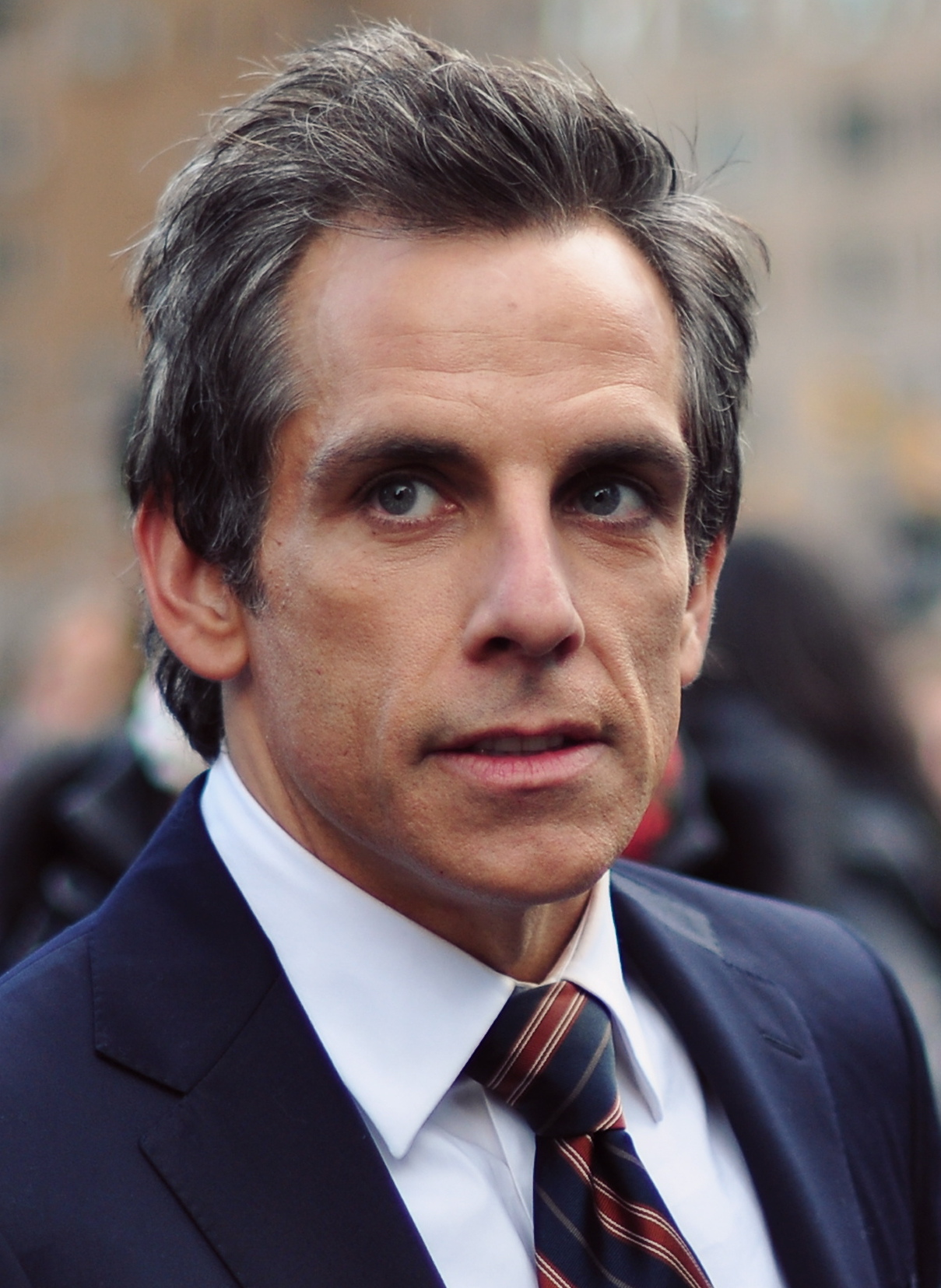
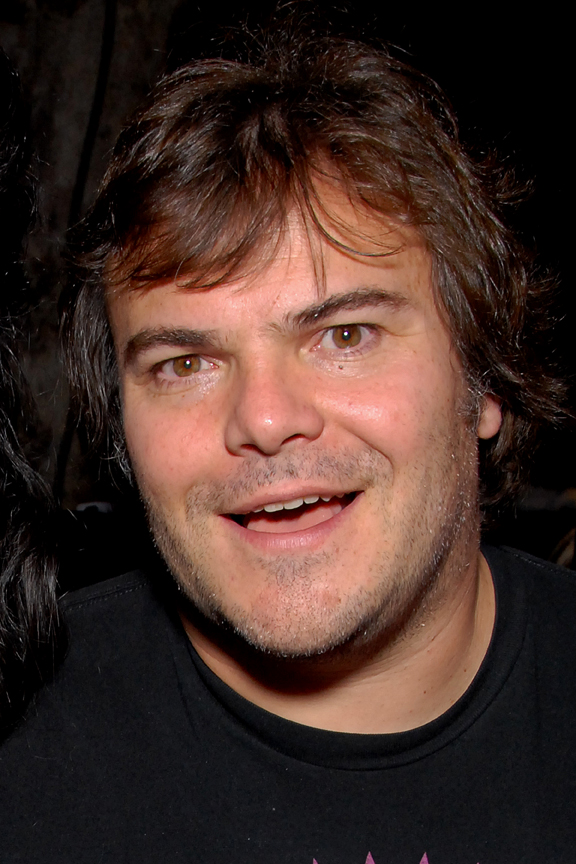
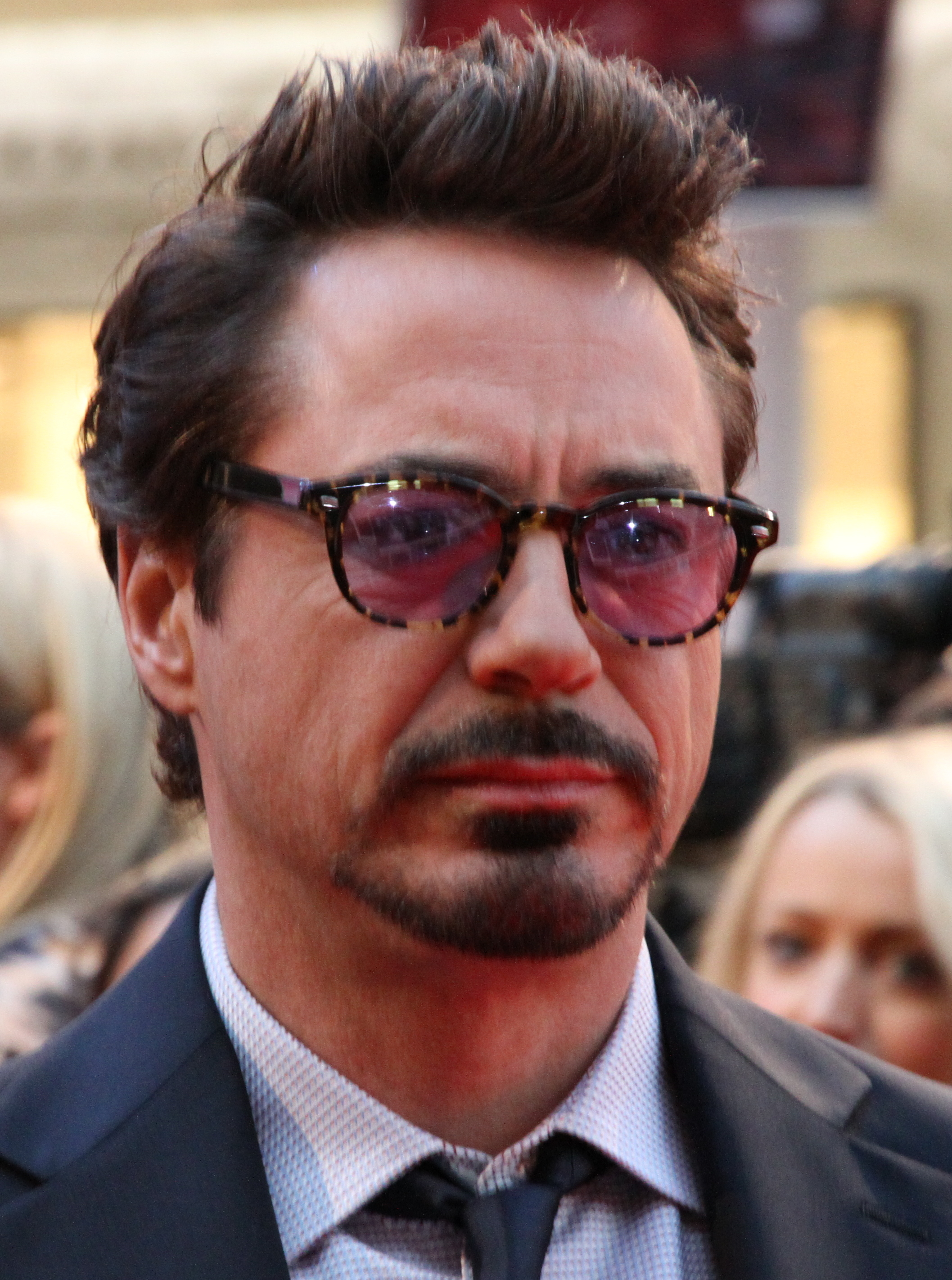
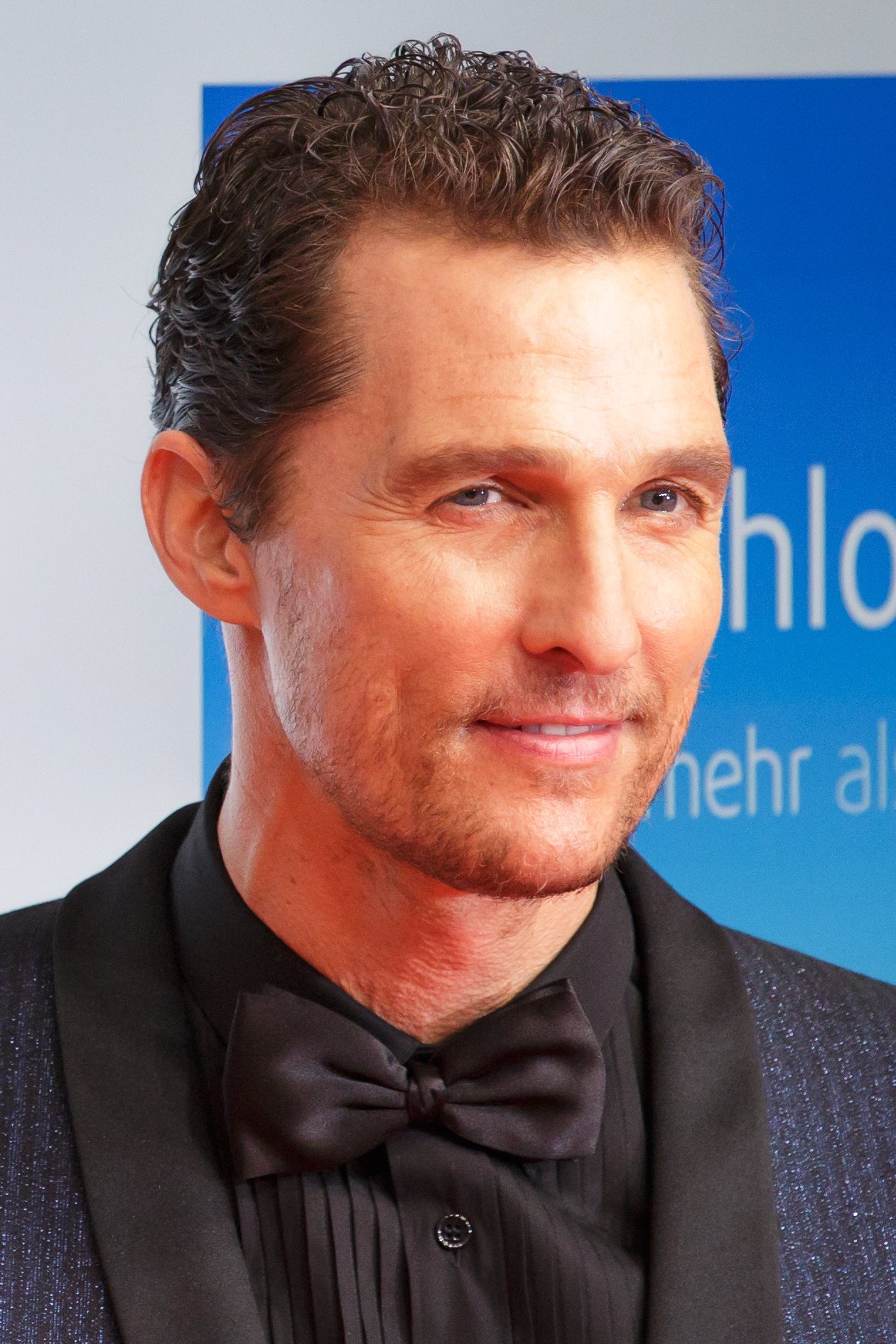
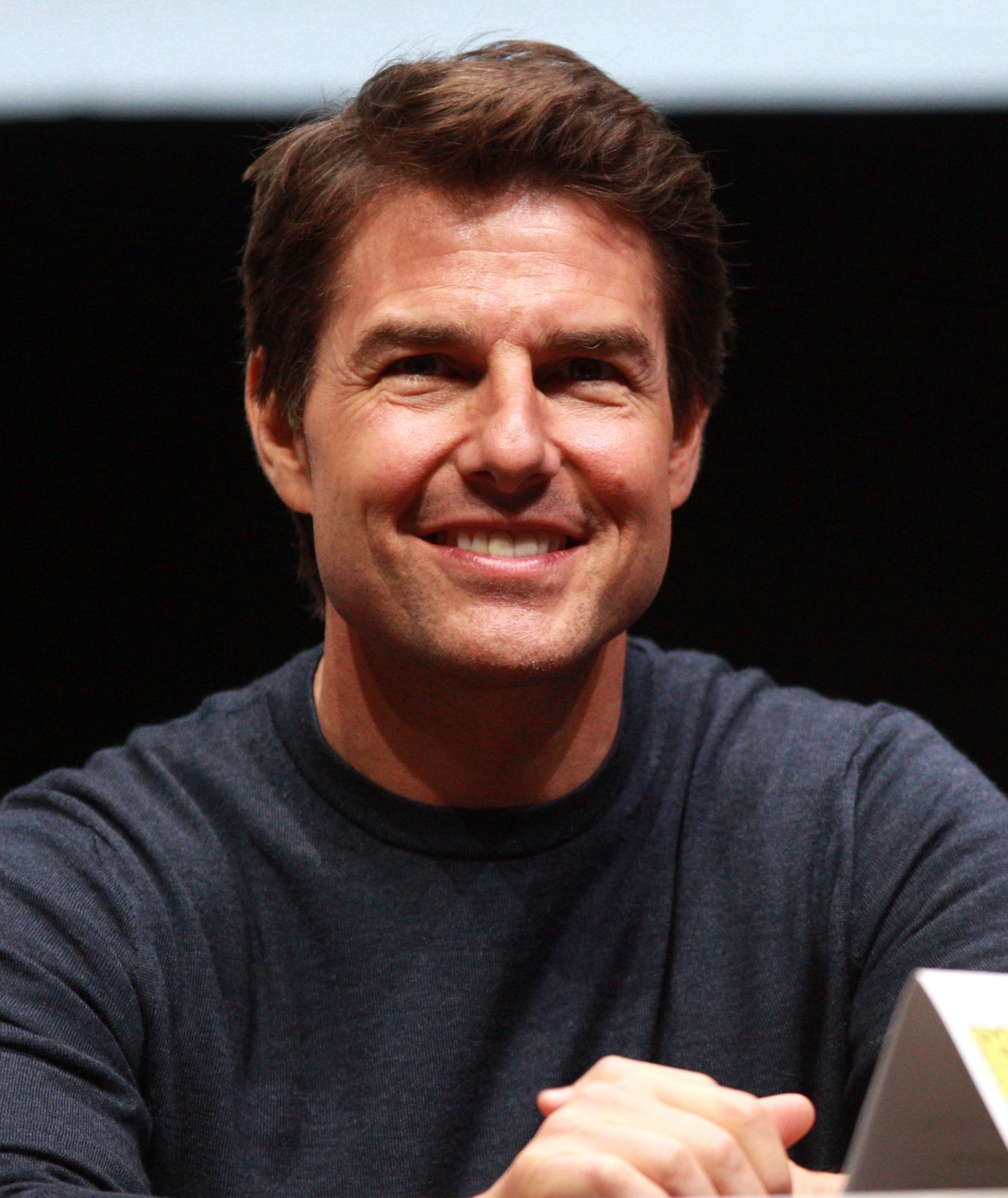
(L to R) Ben Stiller (pictured in 2010), Jack Black (2011), Robert Downey Jr. (2012), Matthew McConaughey (2014) and Tom Cruise (2013)
- Ben Stiller as Tugg Speedman: Once the highest-paid, highest-grossing action film star ever due to his Scorcher franchise, his popularity has faltered after attempting to take a more serious direction in his career, and he now has a reputation for appearing in nothing but box office bombs. After drawing negative coverage for his role in Simple Jack, in which he plays a farm boy with an intellectual disability who can talk to animals, he accepts the role of Four Leaf Tayback in a last-ditch attempt to salvage his career. Tugg's faux trailer at the film's start is a preview for Scorcher VI: Global Meltdown, the latest in his series and a spoof of long-running summer action blockbuster franchises.
- Jack Black as Jeff Portnoy: A drug-addicted comedian-actor well known for portraying multiple parts in films that rely on toilet humor, particularly jokes about flatulence. In the film-within-a-film, he plays a raspy-voiced soldier named Fats. He fears filmgoers only find his movies funny because of his farts and nothing else. Portnoy's faux trailer for juvenile family comedy The Fatties: Fart 2, about a family (with each member played by Portnoy) that enjoys passing gas. The trailer acts as a spoof of actor Eddie Murphy's portrayal of multiple characters in films such as The Nutty Professor franchise.
- Robert Downey Jr. as Kirk Lazarus: An Australian method actor and five-time Academy Award winner, Lazarus had a controversial "pigmentation alteration" surgery to temporarily darken his skin for his portrayal of the black character, Staff Sergeant Lincoln Osiris. Lazarus refuses to break character until he has recorded the DVD commentary for a part and only speaks in his character's African-American Vernacular English. Lazarus's faux trailer, Satan's Alley, is about two homosexual monks in a 12th-century Irish monastery, parodying films like Brokeback Mountain and Downey's own scenes with Tobey Maguire (who in a cameo portrays himself playing the other monk) in Wonder Boys. Downey said he modeled Lazarus on three actors: Russell Crowe, Daniel Day-Lewis and Colin Farrell. Lazarus was originally intended to be Irish, but Downey felt more comfortable using an Australian accent, since he had portrayed an Australian character in Natural Born Killers. Makeup effects creator Rick Baker designed and created Downey's Osiris makeup while John Blake and Greg Nelson handled the on-set application.
- Nick Nolte as Four Leaf Tayback: The author of Tropic Thunder, a fake memoir of his war experiences on which the film-within-a-film is based. He suggests the idea of dropping the actors in the middle of the jungle to get them looking and feeling like soldiers lost in a foreign land.
- Steve Coogan as Damien Cockburn: The inexperienced British film director who is unable to control the actors in the film. The character was partly inspired by Richard Stanley, and his experience of directing the 1996 film The Island of Dr. Moreau, with Val Kilmer and Marlon Brando.
- Jay Baruchel as Kevin Sandusky: A novice actor, he is the only cast member to have read the script and book and attended the assigned boot camp prior to the film. Sandusky plays a young soldier named Brooklyn in the film-within-a-film. Brooklyn and Sandusky each occupy the position of straight man in character in the film-within-a-film and its cast, being the only actor without an internal conflict or deep-seated insecurity. He often serves as a mediator when tensions between the other members of the cast get high.
- Danny McBride as Cody Underwood: The film's explosives expert and helicopter pilot. He has developed a reputation for being a dangerous pyromaniac after an incident while working on Freaky Friday nearly blinded Jamie Lee Curtis.
- Brandon T. Jackson as Alpa Chino: A closeted gay rapper who is attempting to cross over into acting, portraying a soldier named Motown, while promoting his "Bust-A-Nut" candy bar and "Booty Sweat" energy drink. He feels his image as a rapper would not allow him to be openly gay. His name is a play on Al Pacino. Kevin Hart turned down the role because he did not want to play a gay character.
- Bill Hader as Studio Executive Rob Slolom: Grossman's assistant and right-hand man
- Brandon Soo Hoo as Tran: The 12-year-old leader of the Flaming Dragon gang. The character was compared to God's Army guerrilla leaders Johnny and Luther Htoo.
- Reggie Lee as Byong: The second-in-command of the Flaming Dragon gang.
- Trieu Tran as Tru: A dedicated mercenary and actor in the Flaming Dragon gang.
- Matthew McConaughey as Rick "The Pecker" Peck: Speedman's extremely devoted agent and best friend.
- Yvette Nicole Brown as Peck's assistant
- Tom Cruise as Les Grossman: The balding, profane, ill-tempered studio executive producing Tropic Thunder. Some commentators and Hollywood insiders believe he is loosely based on film producer Scott Rudin, famous for his volcanic temper and poor treatment of others.

Various celebrities portray themselves, including Tobey Maguire, Tyra Banks, Maria Menounos, Martin Lawrence, The Mooney Suzuki, Jason Bateman, Lance Bass, Jennifer Love Hewitt, Alicia Silverstone, Christine Taylor, Mini Andén, Anthony Ruivivar, Rachel Avery, and Jon Voight. Co-writer Justin Theroux appears in two brief roles as a UH-1 Huey gunner and the disc jockey from Zoolander (shown in a deleted scene).

== Production ==
=== Script ===
... I feel the tone of the movie is its own thing. I think there are elements of satire, but I don't think it should be categorized just as that. There are elements of parody in it, but obviously I don't think it's just that. I feel like hopefully it's its own thing, which has a lot of familiar stuff that we are playing off of.

— Ben Stiller reacting to the film being called a spoof

Ben Stiller developed the premise for Tropic Thunder while shooting Empire of the Sun, in which he played a small part. He wanted to make a film based on the actors he knew who became "self-important" and "self-involved" and appeared to believe that they had been part of a real military unit after taking part in boot camps to prepare for war film roles.

Co-writer Justin Theroux revealed that the initial script concept was to have actors go to a mock boot camp and return with post-traumatic stress disorder. The final script was developed to satirize Vietnam War films such as Apocalypse Now, Rambo, Missing in Action, Platoon, Full Metal Jacket, Hamburger Hill, and The Deer Hunter. Theroux pointed out that viewers have an increased awareness of the inner workings of Hollywood due to celebrity websites and Hollywood news sources, so the script was easier to write. Dialogue for unscripted portions of the storyboard was developed on set by the actors or was improvised.

=== Casting ===
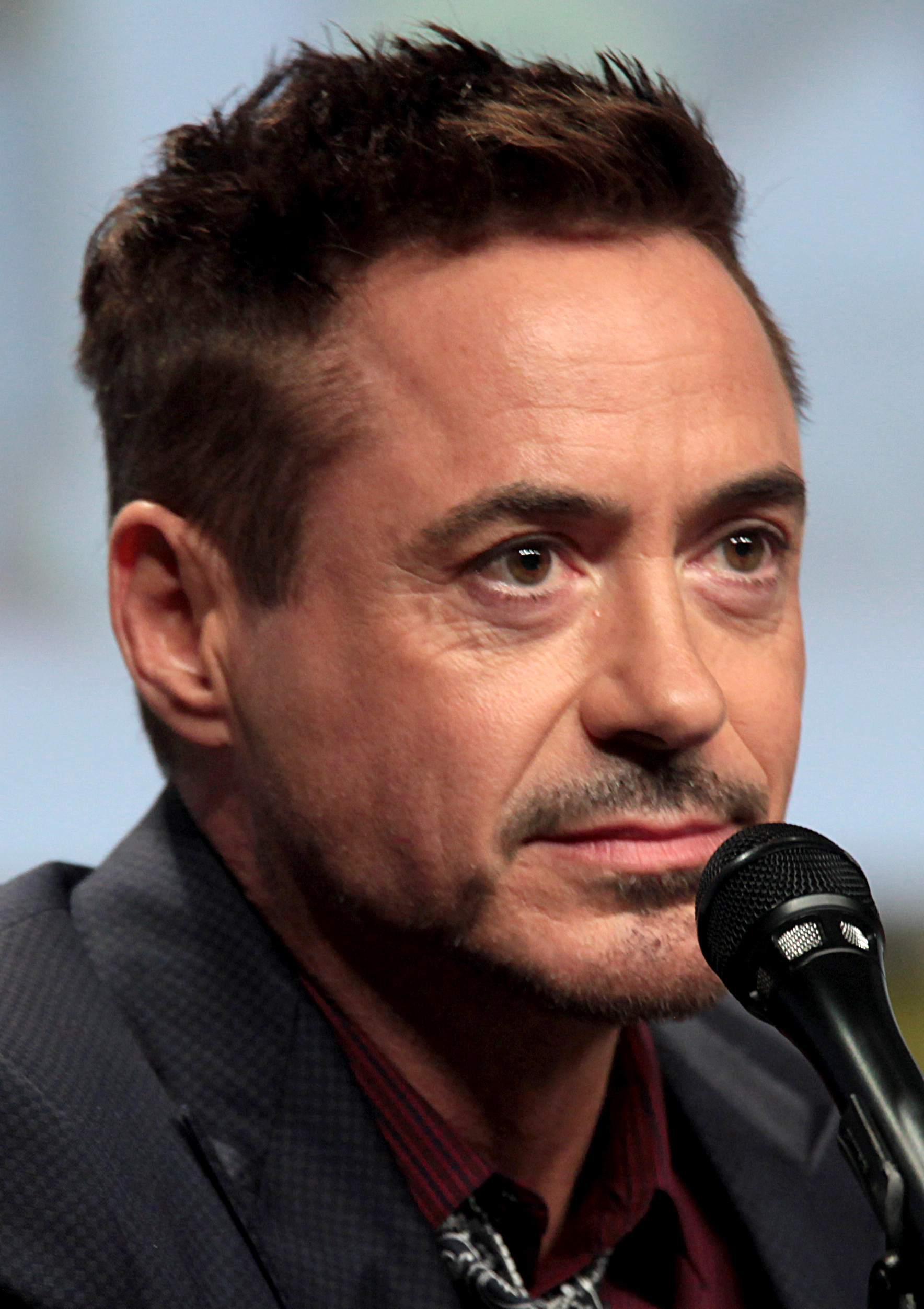
Robert Downey Jr. shown with his character Kirk Lazarus, himself in character as Lincoln Osiris. To portray the character, Downey required two hours of make-up application.

Stiller's original plan was to cast Keanu Reeves as Tugg Speedman and himself as Rick Peck. Etan Cohen created the role of Kirk Lazarus as a way of lampooning the great lengths that some method actors go to depict a role. Robert Downey Jr. was approached by Stiller about the part while on vacation in Hawaii. Downey said on CBS's The Early Show that his first reaction was, "This is the stupidest idea I've ever heard!" and that Stiller responded, "Yeah, I know – isn't it great?" In another interview, Downey said that he accepted the part but, having no idea where or even how to start building the character of Lazarus, eventually settled on a jive-esque speech pattern and a ragged bass voice; he then auditioned Lazarus's voice over the phone to Stiller, who approved the characterization immediately. Downey revealed that he modeled the character on actors Russell Crowe, Colin Farrell, and Daniel Day-Lewis. The initial script was written for Downey's character to be Irish, but was altered after Downey stated he could improvise better as an Australian, having previously played a similar outlandish Australian character in the film Natural Born Killers. Downey's practice of remaining in character between takes and even off the film set was also written into the script for his character to perform. Downey required between one-and-a-half and two hours of makeup application. According to Downey, "One makeup artist would start on one side of my face and a second makeup artist would start on the other side, and then they'd meet in the middle."

Downey acknowledged the potential controversy over his role: "At the end of the day, it's always about how well you commit to the character. If I didn't feel it was morally sound, or that it would be easily misinterpreted that I'm just C. Thomas Howell [in Soul Man], I would've stayed home." Co-star Brandon T. Jackson stated: "When I first read the script, I was like: What? Blackface? But when I saw him [act] he, like, became a black man ... It was just good acting. It was weird on the set because he would keep going with the character. He's a method actor." Stiller commented on Downey's portrayal of a white actor playing a black man: "When people see the movie – in the context of the film, he's playing a method actor who's gone to great lengths to play a black guy. The movie is skewering actors and how they take themselves so seriously." Stiller previewed the film before the NAACP, and several black journalists reacted positively to the character.

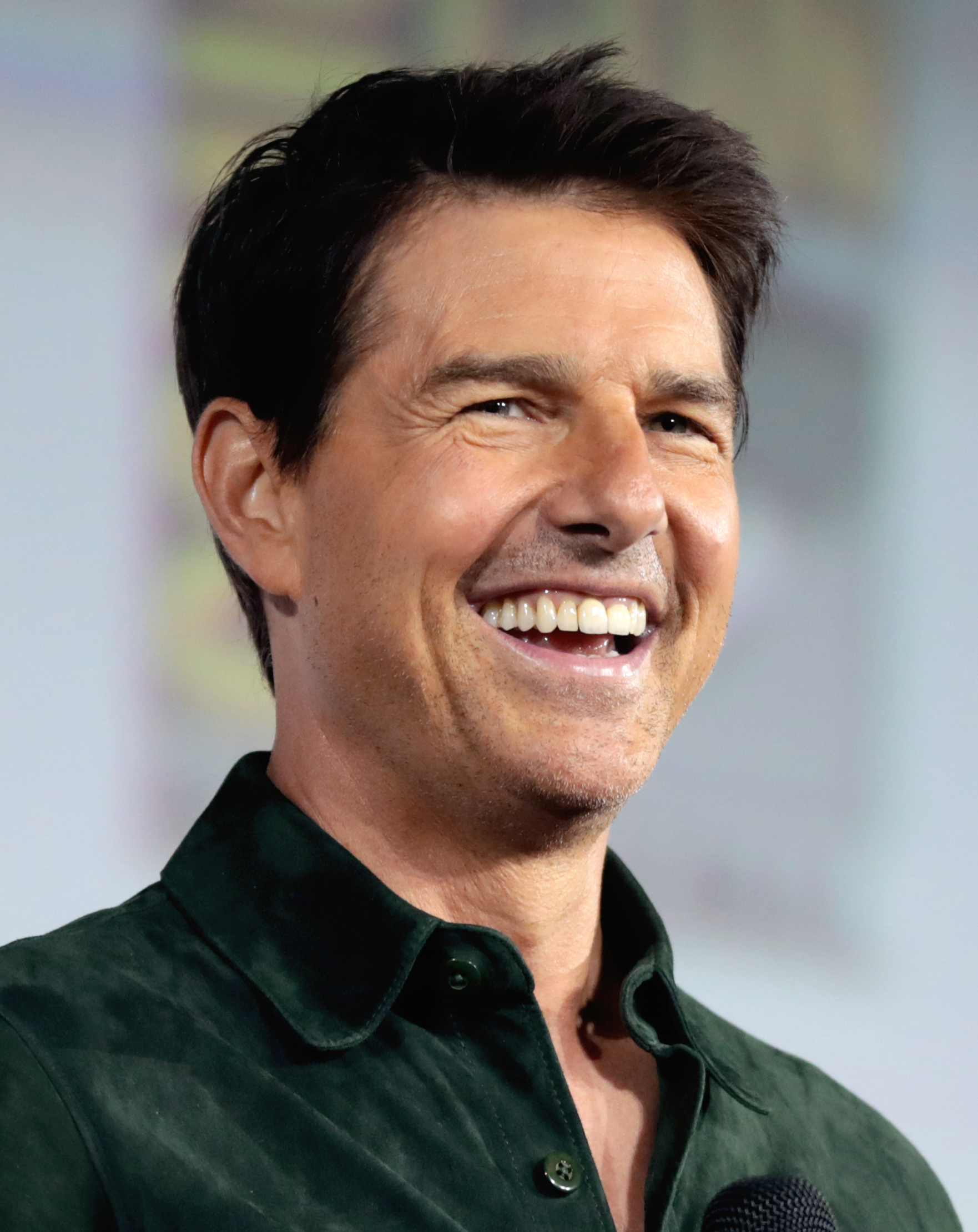
Tom Cruise shown with his character Les Grossman. To portray his character, Cruise used a fatsuit, fake large hands, and a bald cap; many commented that the character's physical appearance was loosely based on film producers Scott Rudin and Harvey Weinstein.

Tom Cruise was initially set to cameo as Stiller's character's agent, Rick Peck. Instead, Cruise suggested adding a studio head character, and the idea was incorporated into the script. Stiller and Cruise worked together to create the new character, Les Grossman, as a middle-aged businessman. The role required that Cruise don a fatsuit, large prosthetic hands, and a bald cap. It was Cruise's idea to give the character large hands and dance to "Low". Stiller intended to keep Cruise's role a secret until the film's release. In addition, Paramount Pictures refused to release promotional pictures of Cruise's character to the media. In November 2007, images of Cruise wearing a bald headpiece and a fatsuit appeared on Inside Edition, as well as on the Internet. Cruise's attorneys threatened a lawsuit if photos showing Cruise in costume were published. They approached various sites that were hosting the image and quickly had it removed. A representative for Cruise stated: "Mr. Cruise's appearance was supposed to be a surprise for his fans worldwide. Paparazzi have ruined what should have been a fun discovery for moviegoers." The photography agency INF, who debuted the image, responded with a statement: "While these pictures were taken without breaking any criminal or civil laws, we've decided to pull them from circulation effective immediately."

Serving as a last-minute replacement, Tobey Maguire was available to be on set for only two hours to film his scenes in Satan's Alley. Downey said he was amazed Maguire would agree to do the film and felt like they were creating a "karmic pay-off" for their scenes together in the 2000 film Wonder Boys, where Downey's character has a one-night stand with Maguire's character. After Cruise vacated the role of Rick Peck, Owen Wilson was cast to play the part. Following his suicide attempt in August 2007, Wilson dropped out of the film and was replaced by Matthew McConaughey.

=== Filming ===
Southern California and Mexico were considered for the main unit filming, but Stiller selected the Hawaiian island of Kauaʻi, where he has a home, for the majority of the shooting. Kauaʻi was chosen over Mexico because a tax credit was negotiated with the Kauaʻi Film Commission for in-state spending. Cinematographer John Toll stated that the island was also selected for its similarity to Vietnam, based on its dense foliage, variety of terrains, and weather. Kauaʻi was first scouted in 2004 as a possible location to film Tropic Thunder. Stiller spent more than 25 hours over six weeks exploring the island, using all-terrain vehicles, boats, and helicopters. DreamWorks gave the green light for filming in 2006, but preproduction lasted for six months, most of this time spent on scouting additional locations for filming. Filming occurred on sets at Universal Studios in Hollywood for the Los Angeles and interior scenes.

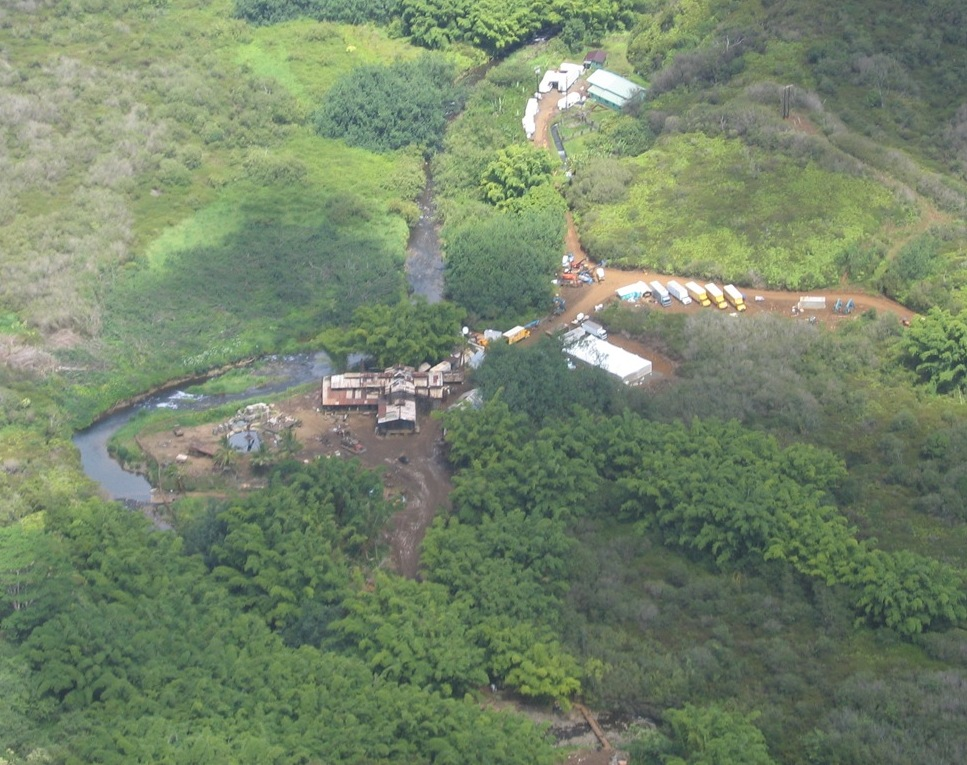
Film set in Kauaʻi in September 2007

Tropic Thunder was the first major studio production on Kauaʻi in five years. It is the largest production filmed on the island to date, and contributed more than $60 million to the local economy. Tim Ryan, the executive editor of Hawaii Film & Video Magazine, commented on the filming on the island: "I think Tropic Thunder will give Kauaʻi much needed and long idled publicity in the production arena.... It should put Kauaʻi back on the production consideration radar." Preliminary production crews were on the island starting in December 2006, and principal photography began in July 2007, with filming lasting 13 weeks over seven separate locations on the island. Much of the filming took place on private land as well as conservation status designated areas. Casting calls on the island sought 500 residents to portray the villagers in the film. Two units shot simultaneously on the island from the ground, and an aerial unit shot from helicopters. Many of the sets and the bridge used for one of the final scenes were built in three months. The island's erratic weather hampered filming with rain and lightning. The crew also faced complications in moving the equipment and cast due to the difficult terrain.

The film advising company Warriors Inc. was enlisted to ensure that the war scenes looked authentic, including the attire worn by the actors. Former members of the U.S. military taught the actors how to handle, fire, and reload their weapons, as well as to perform various tactical movements. The opening war scene was filmed over three weeks and required 50 stuntmen. Animatics were used to map out the necessary camera angles for filming.

=== Effects ===
Six companies working on different scenes and elements created 500 shots of visual effects in the film. These were at times altered weekly due to the reactions of test audiences in screenings. CIS Visual Effects Group assisted with the Scorcher VI faux trailer and twenty additional shots for the home media release. To expand on the comedy in the film, some of the explosions and crashes were embellished to look more destructive. The visual effects supervisor Michael Fink reflected on the exaggerated explosions: "We worked really hard to make the CG crashing helicopter in the hot landing sequence look real. Ben was adamant about that, but at the same time he wanted the explosion to be huge. When you see it hit the ground, it was like it was filled with gasoline! It was the same thing with Ben's sergeant character, who almost intercepts a hand grenade ... Now, I was in the Army for three years and no hand grenade would make an explosion like that ... But it was a big dramatic moment and it looks really cool ... and feels kind of real."

Filming the large napalm explosion in the opening scene of the film required a 450-foot (140-meter) row of explosive pots containing 1,100 U.S. gallons (4,200 liters) of gasoline and diesel fuel. All the palm trees used in the explosion were moved to the specific location after the crew determined the impact of the lighting and necessary camera angles. Due to the size and cost of the 1.25-second explosion, it was performed only once and was captured from twelve cameras. For the safety of the crew and cast, the detonators were added one hour before the explosion and nobody was allowed to be within 400 feet (120 m) during detonation. The explosion was made up of twelve individual explosions and resulted in a mushroom cloud that reached 350 feet (110 m) in the air. For the scene in the film, Danny McBride's character, Cody Underwood, was the only actor shown in the shot of the explosion. All the other characters were added digitally. The explosion of the bridge in one of the final scenes used nine cameras to capture the shot, and the crew was required to be 3,000 feet (910 m) away for their safety.

== Promotion ==
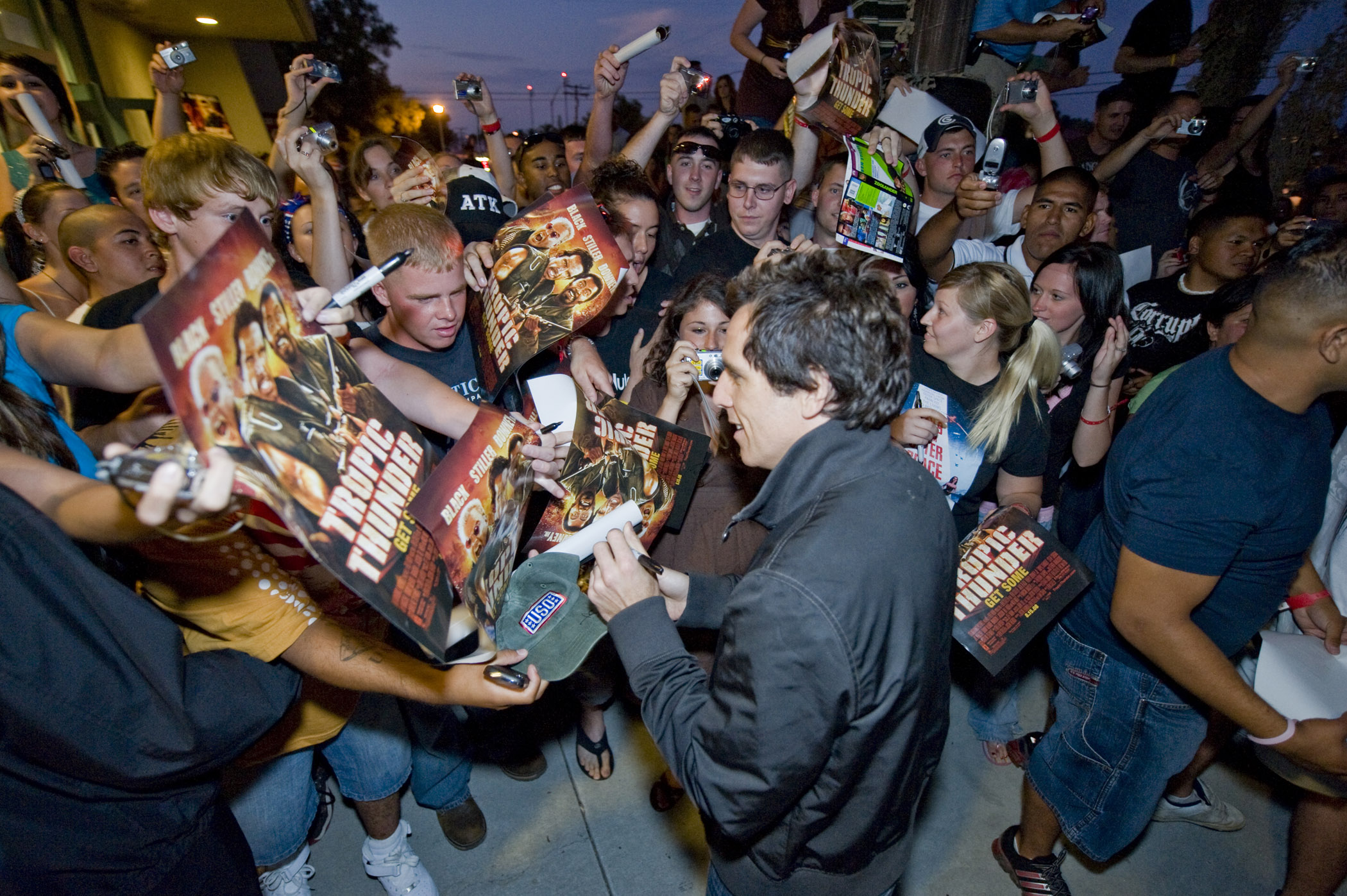
Stiller signing autographs before a screening at Camp Pendleton on August 3, 2008

A trailer for the film was released in April 2008. The Calgary Herald gave it a rating of 3/5, commenting: "This could either be good or very, very bad." Gary Susman of Entertainment Weekly questioned whether the film would "... turn into precisely the kind of bloated action monstrosity that it's making fun of." The trailer received the "Best Comedy Trailer" award at the 9th annual Golden Trailer Awards. DreamWorks also released a red band trailer, the first of its kind used by the studio to promote one of its films.

Stiller, Downey, and Black appeared on the seventh-season finale of American Idol in a sketch as The Pips performing with Gladys Knight (via archival footage). The three actors also later performed a sketch at the 2008 MTV Movie Awards which featured the actors attempting to create a successful viral video to promote the film with awkward results. In September 2008, Stiller and Downey attended the San Sebastián International Film Festival to promote the film. A screening was shown, but it was not chosen to compete against the other films at the festival.

Between April 2008 and the film's commercial release in August 2008, the film had over 250 promotional screenings. On August 3, 2008, Stiller, Downey, and Black visited Camp Pendleton, a U.S. Marine Corps base in California, to present a screening to over a thousand military members and their families. The screening was on behalf of the United Service Organizations and included the actors heading to the screening by helicopter and Humvees. On August 8, 2008, a special 30-minute fictional E! True Hollywood Story aired about the making of Tropic Thunder. In video games, a themed scavenger hunt was incorporated into Tom Clancy's Rainbow Six: Vegas 2, and Stiller allowed his likeness to be used in the online Facebook application game based on the film.

As a tie-in for the film's release, Paramount announced it would market the energy drink known in the film as "Booty Sweat". Michael Corcoran, Paramount's president of consumer products, commented on the release: "We're very excited, because it has the potential to live for quite a while, well beyond the film." The drink was sold in college bookstores, on Amazon.com, and at other retailers.

=== Faux websites and mockumentary ===
Several faux websites were created for the characters and some of their prior film roles. A website for Simple Jack, a faux film exhibited within the film, was removed by DreamWorks on August 4, 2008, due to protests from disability advocates. In addition, other promotional websites were created for "Make Pretty Skin Clinic", the fictitious company that performed the surgery of the film's character Kirk Lazarus, along with one for the energy drink "Booty Sweat".

In mid-July 2008, a faux trailer for the mockumentary Rain of Madness was released. The mockumentary was a parody of Hearts of Darkness: A Filmmaker's Apocalypse. It follows co-writer Justin Theroux as a fictitious documentarian named Jan Jürgen documenting the behind-the-scenes aspects of the film within the film. Marketing for the faux documentary included a movie poster and an official website prior to Tropic Thunder's release. The mockumentary was released on the iTunes Store after the film's release and was also included on the home video release. Amy Powell, an advertising executive with Paramount, reflected on the timing of the release of Madness: "We always thought that people would be talking about Tropic Thunder at the water cooler, and that's why we decided to release Rain of Madness two weeks into Tropic's run—to keep this positive buzz going."

== Release ==
=== Theatrical release ===
Tropic Thunder held an early screening at the 2008 San Diego Comic-Con, two weeks before it officially premiered on August 11, 2008, at the Mann Village Theatre in Westwood, California and two days before its wide release. Members of several disability groups picketed before the premiere, protesting at the portrayal of intellectual disability shown in the film. The groups revealed that it was the first time that they had ever protested together at an event. As a result of the protest, the normally unobstructed views of the red carpet leading to the premiere were blocked off by 10-foot (3-m)-high fences and there was an increase in the number of security personnel present. No protests were held at the United Kingdom's September premiere.

The North American release was scheduled for July 11, 2008, but was delayed until August 15, before being brought forward to August 13. As a result of the move from July, 20th Century Fox moved its family comedy Meet Dave in the open slot. The August 13 release date was also the opening weekends for the animated family film Star Wars: The Clone Wars and the horror film Mirrors. Studios consider the third week of August to be a weaker performing period than earlier in the summer because of students returning to school. Previous R-rated comedies such as The 40-Year-Old Virgin and Superbad were released in mid-August and performed well at the box office. Reacting to Tropic Thunder's release date, Rob Moore, vice chairman of Paramount Pictures, stated, "For a young person at the end of summer, you want to have some fun and forget about going back to school. What better than a crazy comedy?"

== Home media ==
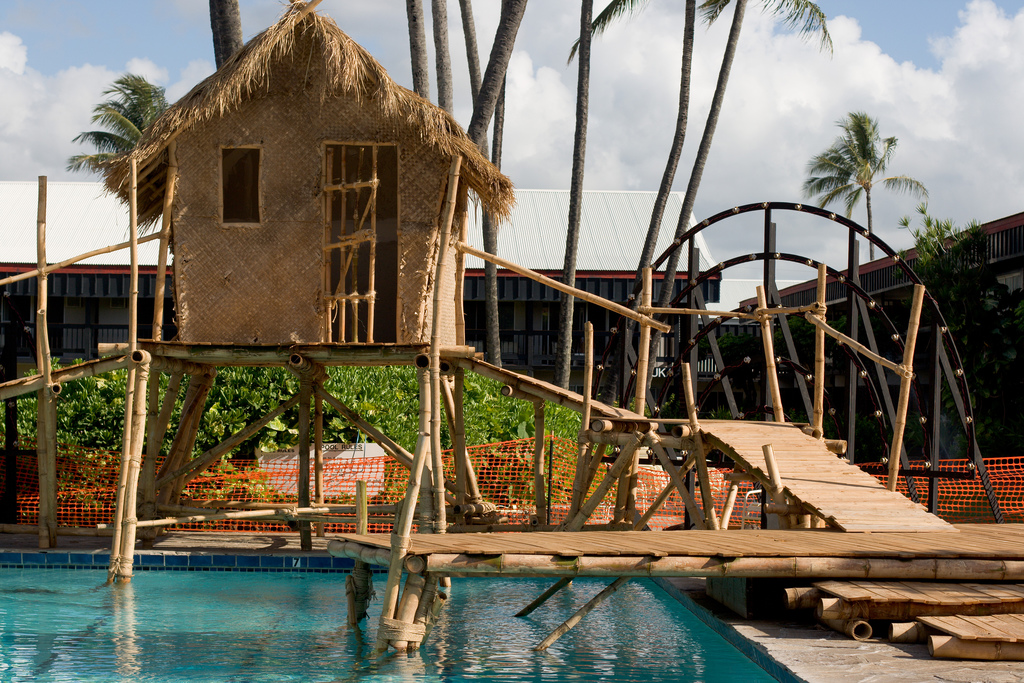
This Kauaʻi film set was used for the Tugg Speedman "Let's be friends" speech scene.

Tropic Thunder was released in the United States on DVD and Blu-ray on November 18, 2008, three months after its release and a week after the end of its theatrical run in the US and Canada. The film was released on home video on January 26, 2009, in the United Kingdom. Special features include audio commentaries (including one featuring Stiller, Downey, and Black, with Downey providing his commentary as Lincoln Osiris, a nod to a joke in the film that Lazarus never breaks character until he completes the DVD commentary), several featurettes, deleted scenes, and an alternate ending. A 2-disc director's cut, with 12 minutes of extended footage, was also released, containing additional special features and the Rain of Madness mockumentary.

For the film's first week of release, Tropic Thunder placed on several video charts. It reached second place on the Nielsen VideoScan First Alert sales chart and Nielsen's Blu-ray Disc chart, earning $19,064,959 (not including Blu-ray sales). In rentals, it placed first on the Home Media Magazine's video rental chart. The DVD sales in 2008 totaled $42,271,059, placing it in 28th for DVD sales for the year. By September 2009, 2,963,000 DVD units had been sold, gathering revenue of $49,870,248.

In September 2008, the film's producer DreamWorks Pictures split from Paramount Pictures and became an independent studio again, with Paramount's parent company Viacom having purchased DreamWorks in February 2006. However, after the split happened, Paramount still retained the rights to all of the live-action films DreamWorks had produced since 1997, including Tropic Thunder. It was later made available on Paramount's streaming service Paramount+. In 2022, a HDR Dolby Vision mastered Ultra HD Blu-ray was released through Kino Lorber, under license from Paramount.

== Reception ==
=== Critical response ===
On the review aggregator website Rotten Tomatoes, Tropic Thunder has an approval rating of 82% based on 245 reviews, with an average rating of 7.4/10. The website's critical consensus reads, "With biting satire, plenty of subversive humor, and an unforgettable turn by Robert Downey Jr., Tropic Thunder is a triumphant late summer comedy." Metacritic, which uses a weighted average, gave the film a score of 71 out of 100 based on 39 critics, indicating "generally favorable reviews". Audiences polled by CinemaScore gave the film an average grade of "B" on an A+ to F scale.

Michael Cieply from the New York Times stated that the film was "shaping up as one of [Paramount]'s best prospects for the summer." Claudia Puig of USA Today gave the film a somewhat positive review: "There are some wildly funny scenes, a few leaden ones and others that are scattershot, with humorous satire undercut by over-the-top grisliness. Still, when it's funny, it's really funny."

Other reviewers were more critical. Todd McCarthy's review in Variety stated: "Apart from startling, out-there comic turns by Robert Downey Jr. and Tom Cruise, however, the antics here are pretty thin, redundant and one-note." Glenn Kenny of RogerEbert.com said that the film was "intermittently amusing but entirely smug and hateful." Rick Groen of The Globe and Mail said that it was "an assault in the guise of a comedy—watching it is like getting mugged by a clown." J.R. Jones of Chicago Reader stated, "The rest of the movie never lives up to the hilarity of the opening, partly because the large-scale production smothers the gags but mostly because those gags are so easy to smother." Roger Ebert of the Chicago Sun-Times gave 3.5/4 and wrote, "The movie is, may I say, considerably better than Stiller's previous film, Zoolander (2001). It's the kind of summer comedy that rolls in, makes a lot of people laugh and rolls on to video."

The faux trailers before the film also received mixed reviews. David Ansen of Newsweek approved of the trailers: "Tropic Thunder is the funniest movie of the summer—so funny, in fact, that you start laughing before the film itself has begun." Christy Lemire of the Associated Press called the trailers "the best part of the trip." Robert Wilonsky of The Village Voice was critical, saying that the trailers' comedy "resides in the land of the obvious, easy chuckle."

Downey, Stiller, Black, and Cruise were repeatedly singled out for praise by numerous critics, claiming that they "stole the show", were "off-the-charts hilarious", and would bring viewers "the fondest memories" of their work. Scott Feinberg of the Los Angeles Times criticized the concept of Downey's portrayal of a white actor portraying an African American: "I just can't imagine any circumstance under which a blackface performance would be acceptable, any more than I can imagine any circumstance under which the use of the N-word would be acceptable." Sara Vilkomerson said that Cruise did "an astonishingly funny and surprising supporting performance." Logan Hill of New York criticized Cruise's appearance, saying that it "just makes him look a little lost and almost pathetic—shucking and jiving, trying to appeal to the younger moviegoers who are abandoning him."

Several critics commented on the controversy over lines in the film about the mentally disabled. Duane Dudek of the Milwaukee Journal Sentinel wrote that the film "is just sophomoric enough to offend. And while it is also funny, it is without the empathy or compassion to cause us to wonder why we are laughing." Christian Toto of The Washington Times argued against the opposition: "Tropic Thunder is drawing fire from special interest groups" for "its frequent use of the word 'retard', but discerning audiences will know where the humor is targeted. And they'll be laughing too hard to take offense."

=== Critics' lists ===
In January 2009, Entertainment Weekly included Tropic Thunder in its list "25 Great Comedies From the Past 25 Years" for its "spot-on skewering of Hollywood." The film also appeared on several critics' top ten lists of the best films of 2008. Stephen King placed it at the fourth position, calling the film "the funniest, most daring comedy of the year." The Oregonian's Marc Mohan, placed it sixth, and several critics placed it seventh: Elizabeth Weitzman of the New York Daily News, Premiere magazine, Mike Russell of The Oregonian, as well as Peter Hartlaub of the San Francisco Chronicle. David Ansen of Newsweek placed it eighth and Lisa Schwarzbaum of Entertainment Weekly included the film in the tenth position. In 2025, it was one of the films voted for the "Readers' Choice" edition of The New York Times' list of "The 100 Best Movies of the 21st Century," finishing at number 217.

=== Box office ===
Stacey Snider, the chief executive of DreamWorks, suggested that the film would earn around $30 million in its opening weekend and go on to be as successful as Borat: Cultural Learnings of America for Make Benefit Glorious Nation of Kazakhstan, which earned $129 million in the U.S. and Canada and $260 million worldwide. The Dark Knight had been the number one film at the box office for the four weeks prior to the release of Tropic Thunder. Bob Thompson, a writer for the National Post, speculated that Tropic Thunder's opening weekend would outperform The Dark Knight for the weekend. In a list compiled prior to the summer's film releases, Entertainment Weekly predicted that the film would be the tenth highest-grossing film of the summer at the American box office with $142.6 million.

Tropic Thunder opened in 3,319 theaters and, for its first five days of American and Canadian release, earned $36.8 million. The film placed first in the weekend's box office with $25.8 million surpassing Star Wars: The Clone Wars and Mirrors, which debuted the same weekend. Reacting to the film's opening receipts, DreamWorks spokesman Chip Sullivan stated, "We're thrilled, quite frankly. It played out exactly how we hoped." In foreign markets for the film's opening weekend, it was released in 418 Russian and 19 United Arab Emirates locations earning $2.2 million and $319,000, respectively.

The film maintained its number one position at the American and Canadian box office for the following two weekends, making it the second film in 2008 (after The Dark Knight) to hold the number-one position for more than two consecutive weekends. The film's widest release was in 3,473 theaters, placing it in the top 25 widest releases in the U.S. for 2008. For 2008, the film was the fifth-highest-grossing domestic R-rated film. The film's U.S. and Canada gross of over $110 million made Tropic Thunder Stiller's most successful film as a director. The film has had gross receipts of $110.5 million in the U.S. and Canada and $85.2 million in international markets for a total of $195.7 million worldwide.

=== Accolades ===
"It's so funny to me that the role is a guy who is an Oscar-seeking moron. His whole motivation is Oscars ... Irony is synonymous with pretty much everything that is going on."

— Downey reacting to his Academy Award nomination for his portrayal of Kirk Lazarus.

In October 2008, Paramount chose to put end-of-year award push funds behind Tropic Thunder and began advertising for Downey to receive a nomination by the Academy Awards for Best Supporting Actor. In a November 2008 issue by Entertainment Weekly, Downey's film role was considered one of the three contenders for Best Supporting Actor. As a way of extending the film-within-a-film "universe" into real life, there were at least two online "For Your Consideration" ads touting Downey's character, Kirk Lazarus, for Best Supporting Actor; one of these contains "scenes" from Satan's Alley that were not in the trailer as released in theaters. At least one of the ads was produced by Paramount Pictures and intended for early For Your Consideration awareness for Downey's role. On January 22, 2009, the Academy of Motion Picture Arts and Sciences nominated Downey for Best Supporting Actor. At the 81st Academy Awards, Downey lost to Heath Ledger, who won posthumously for his role as The Joker in The Dark Knight.

With the onset of the annual Hollywood film award season at the end of 2008, Tropic Thunder began receiving nominations and awards starting with a win for "Hollywood Comedy of the Year Award" at the 12th annual Hollywood Film Festival on October 27, 2008. The film was nominated for Best Motion Picture, Comedy or Musical, for the Satellite Awards. In addition, Downey was nominated for Best Actor in a Supporting Role. The Broadcast Film Critics Association nominated Downey for Best Supporting Actor and awarded Tropic Thunder Best Comedy Movie at the BFCA's Critics' Choice Awards. Both Downey and Cruise received nominations from the Hollywood Foreign Press Association for Golden Globes for Best Supporting Actor. The Boston Society of Film Critics recognized the cast with its Best Ensemble award. Downey was also nominated by both the Screen Actors Guild and the British Academy of Film and Television Arts for Best Supporting Actor awards.

== Possible spin-off ==
Cruise reprised his character Les Grossman for the 2010 MTV Movie Awards. A spin-off film centering on Grossman was announced in 2010. A script has been written by Michael Bacall. In 2012, Bacall said the film will explore the origin of Grossman's anger issues. As of 2022, Cruise and frequent collaborator Christopher McQuarrie are developing the spin-off, though it is not clear whether Grossman will be the protagonist or a supporting character.

== Controversy ==
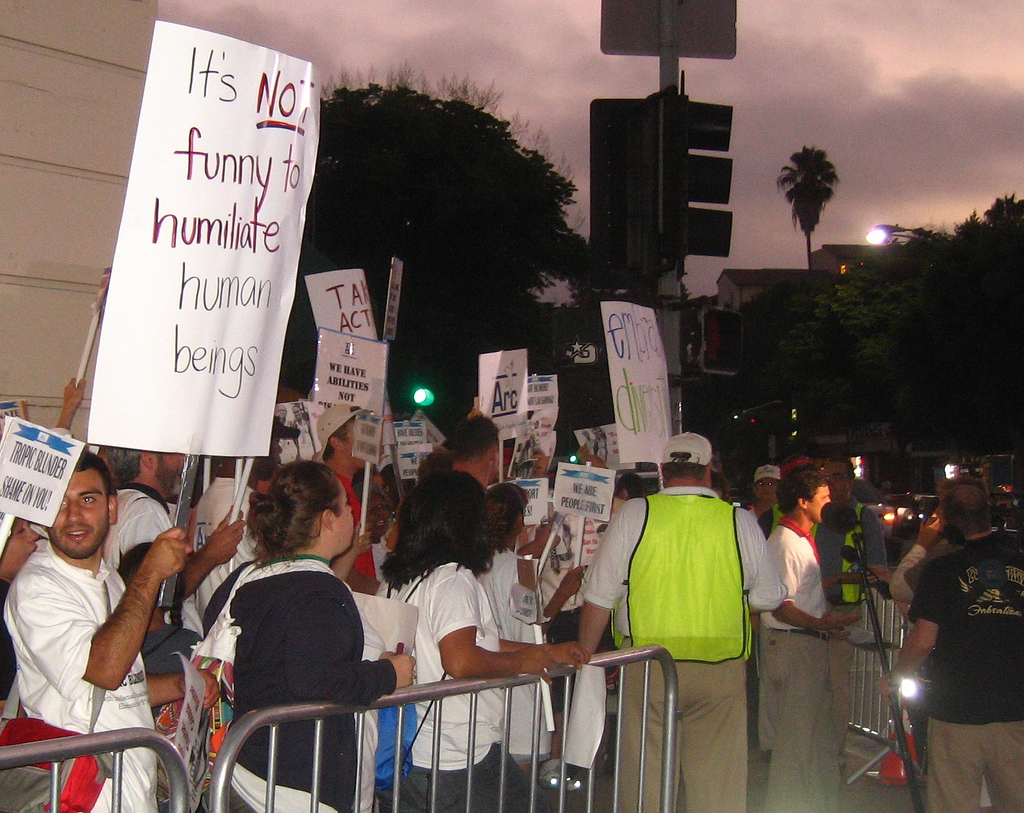
A group protesting against the film on August 11, 2008

Tropic Thunder was criticized by the disability advocacy community. The website for Simple Jack was withdrawn on August 4 amid several groups' concerns over its portrayal of intellectual disability. A spokesman for DreamWorks said, "We heard their concerns, and we understand that taken out of context, the site appeared to be insensitive to people with disabilities." A coalition of more than 20 disability advocacy groups, including the Special Olympics and the Arc of the United States, objected to the film's repeated use of the word "retard". DreamWorks offered to screen the film for the groups on August 8 to determine if it still offended them. The screening was postponed to the same day of the premiere on August 11. After representatives for the groups attended the private screening and were still offended by its content, the groups picketed outside the film's premiere. Timothy Shriver, the chairman of the Special Olympics, stated, "This population struggles too much with the basics to have to struggle against Hollywood. We're sending a message that this hate speech is no longer acceptable."

Disability advocates and others who previewed the film reported that the offensive treatment of individuals with mental disabilities was woven throughout the film's plot. Disability advocates urged people not to see the film, claiming it is demeaning to individuals with mental disabilities and would encourage bullying. Stiller responded, "We screened the movie so many times and this didn't come up until very late ... in the context of the film I think it's really clear, they were making fun of the actors and actors who try to use serious subjects to win awards." Co-writer Etan Cohen echoed Stiller's rationale: "Some people have taken this as making fun of handicapped people, but we're really trying to make fun of the actors who use this material as fodder for acclaim." He went on to state that the film lampoons actors who portray intellectually disabled or autistic characters such as Dustin Hoffman in Rain Man, Tom Hanks in Forrest Gump, and Sean Penn in I Am Sam.

A DreamWorks spokesman stated that Tropic Thunder "is an R-rated comedy that satirizes Hollywood and its excesses" and "makes its point by featuring inappropriate and over-the-top characters in ridiculous situations." The film's advertising was altered, but none of the scenes in the film were edited as a result of the opposition. In response to the controversy, the director's cut of the DVD (but not the Blu-ray) includes a public service announcement in the special features that discourages use of the word "retard".

Another aspect that drew warning before the release of the movie and criticism afterwards was Downey Jr. playing a white Australian actor who dons blackface as part of his method acting the role of an African-American man. He responded by pointing out that this was a case of donning blackface in order to point out how wrong it is.

Some have alleged that the film's characterization—and the non-Jewish Tom Cruise's portrayal—of the Jewish character Les Grossman is antisemitic. In addition to his Jewish name, the character of Grossman also references the Jewish holiday of Purim. Critics have also referred to this performance as "Jewface" as early as 2008, calling it "vulgar" and "exploitation"; others, however, including the St. Louis Jewish Light, which referenced Tropic Thunder in particular, noted that Jewface was a "riff on the practice of blackface and is nowhere near its equivalent." Cruise was largely responsible for the final form Grossman took, including using him as an additional villain, the hairiness of the character, and the "fat hands".

In February 2023, after a fan of the film suggested that Stiller "stop apologizing for doing this movie [...] [which is] [e]ven funnier now with cancel culture the way it is. It's a MOVIE. Ya'll can just get over it," Stiller responded on Twitter, "Don't know who told you that." Stiller additionally responded to the fan that the former "make[s] no apologies for Tropic Thunder" and is "proud of it and the work everyone did on it." Years before, in 2018, Stiller wrote on Twitter, "Actually Tropic Thunder was boycotted 10 years ago when it came out, and I apologized then [...] It was always meant to make fun of actors trying to do anything to win awards. I stand by my apology, the movie [...] [a]nd the great people and work of the @SpecialOlympics."

== Soundtrack ==
Tropic Thunder: Original Motion Picture Soundtrack

Soundtrack album by Various Artists
- Released: August 5, 2008
- Length: 56:31
- Label: Lakeshore

Tropic Thunder: Original Motion Picture Score

Film score by Theodore Shapiro
- Released: August 5, 2008
- Length: 40:10
- Label: Lakeshore

Tropic Thunder's score and soundtrack were released on August 5, 2008, the week before the film's theatrical release. The score was composed by Theodore Shapiro, conducted by Pete Anthony and performed by the Hollywood Studio Symphony. William Ruhlmann of AllMusic gave the score a positive review, stating it is "...an affectionate and knowing satire of the history of Hollywood action movie music, penned by an insider." Thomas Simpson of Soundtrack.Net called it "...a mixture of fun, seriousness, rock n' roll and great scoring."

Five songs—"Cum On Feel the Noize" by Quiet Riot, "Sympathy for the Devil" by The Rolling Stones, "For What It's Worth" by Buffalo Springfield, "Low" by Flo Rida and T-Pain, and "Get Back" by Ludacris—were not present on the soundtrack despite appearing in the film. The soundtrack features songs from The Temptations, MC Hammer, Creedence Clearwater Revival, Edwin Starr, and other artists. The single "Name of the Game" by The Crystal Method, featuring Ryu, has an exclusive remix on the soundtrack. The soundtrack debuted 20th on Billboard's Top Soundtracks list and peaked at 39th on its Top Independent Albums list. James Christopher Monger of allmusic compared the music to other film's soundtracks such as Platoon, Full Metal Jacket, and Forrest Gump and called it "...a fun but slight listen that plays out like an old late-'70s K-Tel compilation with a few bonus cuts from the future."

Track listing
No.	Title	Writer(s)	Artist	Length
1.	"Name of the Game" (The Crystal Method's Big Ass T.T. Mix)	Ken Jordan; Scott Kirkland; Tom Morello	The Crystal Method	5:11
2.	"Ball of Confusion"	Barrett Strong; Norman J. Whitfield	The Temptations	4:08
3.	"Run Through the Jungle"	John Fogerty	Creedence Clearwater Revival	3:05
4.	"Sadeness"	Michael Cretu; David Fairstein; Frank Peterson	Enigma	4:13
5.	"U Can't Touch This"	Rick James; Stanley Burrell; Alonzo Miller	MC Hammer	4:14
6.	"Ready Set Go"	Nick Grant	Ben Gidsjoy	5:00
7.	"I Just Want to Celebrate"	Dino Fekaris; Nickolas Zesses	The Mooney Suzuki	3:51
8.	"I'd Love to Change the World"	Alvin Lee	Ten Years After	3:43
9.	"The Pusher"	Hoyt Axton	Steppenwolf	5:48
10.	"Movin' on Up"	Jeff Barry; Ja'Net DuBois	Ja'Net DuBois	1:08
11.	"Frankenstein"	Edgar Winter	The Edgar Winter Group	4:45
12.	"Sometimes When We Touch"	Dan Hill; Barry Mann	Dan Hill	4:08
13.	"War"	Strong; Whitfield	Edwin Starr	4:08
14.	"I Love Tha Pussy"	Cisco Adler; Darryl Farmer; Micah Givens; Ronald Jackson; Brandon T. Jackson	Brandon T. Jackson	3:23
15.	"Get Back"	Ludacris	Ludacris	4:34

== See also ==
- List of films featuring fictional films
- Air America, 1990 Vietnam war action-comedy film starring Robert Downey Jr.
- Galaxy Quest
- Three Amigos
