= University of Health Sciences and Pharmacy in St. Louis =

Private university in Missouri, US

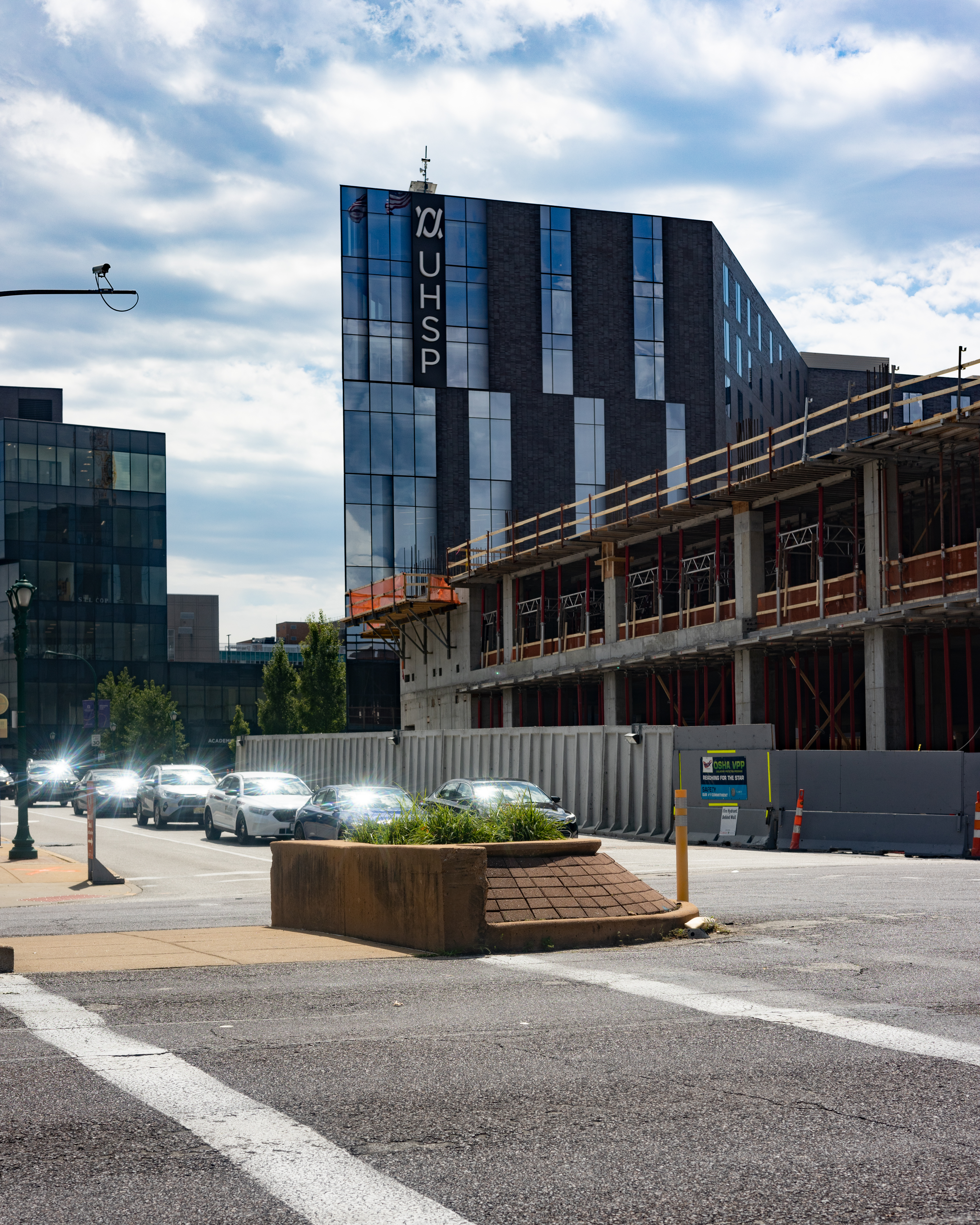
- Former name: St. Louis College of Pharmacy (1864–2020)
- Type: Private health sciences university
- Established: 1864; 162 years ago
- Endowment: $109.8 million (2025)
- President: David D. Allen
- Faculty: 100+
- Undergraduates: 361 (2022)
- Postgraduates: 364 (2022)
- Location: St. Louis, Missouri, U.S. 38.6370°N 90.2615°W
- Campus: Urban, college town Main campus: 9 acres (3.6 ha)
- Colors: Purple & Gold
- Nickname: Eutectics
- Sporting affiliations: NAIA – American Midwest
- Mascot: Mortarmer McPestle (aka The Eutectic)
- Website: www.uhsp.edu

The University of Health Sciences and Pharmacy in St. Louis (UHSP) is a private university focused on the health sciences that is located in St. Louis, Missouri, United States. It was founded in 1864 as the St. Louis College of Pharmacy and was renamed to its current name in 2020. It will become the WashU St. Louis College of Pharmacy in 2027.

The school was the first pharmacy college west of the Mississippi River. It is accredited by the Higher Learning Commission and the Accreditation Council for Pharmacy Education.

On February 24, 2026, UHSP announced it had entered into an agreement to merge into Washington University in St. Louis, pending regulatory approvals. Under the agreement, WashU will assume control of UHSP's campus and the St. Louis College of Pharmacy to be known as "WashU St. Louis College of Pharmacy", while UHSP's other academic programs will be terminated after the 2026–2027 academic year.

== Athletics ==
The UHSP athletic teams are called the Eutectics. The university is a member of the National Association of Intercollegiate Athletics (NAIA), competing in the American Midwest Conference (AMC).

UHSP competes in 20 intercollegiate sports, including two coed sports: cheerleading and esports.

=== Accomplishments ===
In March 2010, David Baker became the first Eutectic to earn All-American honors, winning the award twice for his achievements in the mile. The school's second NAIA all-American was Jordan Robertson in 2013 for the javelin.

On February 24, 2024, Grace Beyer became the career scoring leader in NAIA women's basketball, with 3,874 points through that date, and finished her career (2019–2024) on March 2 with 3,961. Beyer was a three-time first-team NAIA All-American in 2022, 2023 and 2024, after leading NAIA in scoring average four years in a row. She is also the first three-time AMC women's basketball player of the year (2022–2024), and has also been named three times by College Sports Communicators as its NAIA Academic All-American of the Year in women's basketball, receiving the honor in 2022, 2023 and 2024. She eventually won the 2024 all-sport NAIA Academic All-America Team Members of the Year.

In 2024, the school's League of Legends team became the school's first team national champions.

=== Mascot ===
In 1993, the student body voted for the athletic teams to bear the name Eutectics. That year, the school joined the NAIA for athletic competition. The Eutectic, also known as Mortarmer "Morty" McPestle, is depicted in his own white lab coat, with a fierce expression ready for competition.

"The 'Eutectic' describes the scientific process of two solids being combined to form a liquid. It is the perfect metaphor for the University's intercollegiate athletic program—combining athletics and a demanding academic program." The Eutectic was once recognized as the most esoteric mascot in the country by ESPN.

== Notable alumni ==
- Grace Beyer (b. 2001) - all-time second highest scoring women's college basketball player
- Samih Darwazah (b. 1930) - Jordanian politician and founder of Hikma Pharmaceuticals
- Alfred Fleishman (b.1905) - founder of FleishmanHillard
- Henry Minor Faser (b.1882) - academic and businessman
- Dave O'Neal (b.1937) - politician
