= Tropic Thunder: Original Motion Picture Score =

Film score by Theodore Shapiro
- Released: August 5, 2008
- Length: 40:10
- Label: Lakeshore

Professional ratings
Review scores
Source	Rating
Allmusic	3.5/5 stars
SoundtrackNet	4.5/5 stars

Tropic Thunder: Original Motion Picture Score is the film score to the 2008 film Tropic Thunder, composed by Theodore Shapiro and performed by the Hollywood Studio Symphony. It was released on August 5, 2008 by Lakeshore Records.

== Reviews ==
William Ruhlmann of AllMusic gave the score a positive review, stating it is "...an affectionate and knowing satire of the history of Hollywood action movie music, penned by an insider." Thomas Simpson of SoundtrackNet called it "...a mixture of fun, seriousness, rock n' roll and great scoring."

== Track listing ==
Tropic Thunder: Original Motion Picture Score
No.	Title	Length
1.	"You're My Brother"	2:58
2.	"Four Leaf's Plan"	2:39
3.	"Lead Farmer"	3:56
4.	"Enter the Dragons"	0:58
5.	"Bad Feeling About This"	0:52
6.	"Flaming Dragons"	2:32
7.	"Panda Attack"	1:17
8.	"Panda Call"	0:47
9.	"The Golden Triangle"	2:52
10.	"A Night at the Theater"	0:48
11.	"Don't Judge Me"	3:27
12.	"Portnoy's Plan"	0:36
13.	"The Wet Offensive"	1:51
14.	"Shadow Me, Pinocchio"	0:49
15.	"Flamethrower"	1:46
16.	"Breakdown Under"	2:01
17.	"Truck Escape"	1:00
18.	"Blow the Bridge"	2:21
19.	"Real Tears"	3:19
20.	"Simple Jack Trailer"	1:14
21.	"Satan's Alley"	0:53
22.	"Cue Bill Conti"	1:06
