= Kristine Austgulen =

Norwegian basketball player (born 1980)

Personal information
- Born: 4 November 1980 (age 46) Bergen, Norway
- Listed height: 1.81 m (5 ft 11 in)

Career information
- College: VCU (1999–2003)
- WNBA draft: 2002: undrafted
- Playing career: 199?–2007
- Position: Forward

Career history
- 199?–1999: Gimle Basket
- ?–?: Bærums Verk
- 2006–2007: Asker

Career highlights
- Women's Basketball Academic All-American of the Year (2003)

Kristine Austgulen (born 4 November 1980) is a Norwegian female former basketball player.

== Virginia Commonwealth University statistics ==
Ratios
Year	Team	GP	FG%	3P%	FT%	RBG	APG	BPG	SPG	PPG
1999-00	Virginia Commonwealth University	30	42.5%	42.1%	72.9%	5.20	1.40	0.03	0.77	10.10
2000-01	Virginia Commonwealth University	28	48.1%	19.2%	71.4%	6.00	1.20	-	0.70	14.10
2001-02	Virginia Commonwealth University	28	50.0%	32.0%	76.6%	8.14	1.21	0.04	0.96	15.86
2002-03	Virginia Commonwealth University	23	51.7%	27.3%	74.4%	10.74	1.96	0.04	1.26	18.70
Career		109	48.3%	33.6%	74.1%	7.33	1.42	0.03	0.91	14.42

Totals
Year	Team	GP	FG	FGA	3P	3PA	FT	FTA	REB	A	BK	ST	PTS
1999-00	Virginia Commonwealth University	30	114	268	24	57	51	70	156	42	1	23	303
2000-01	Virginia Commonwealth University	28	155	322	5	26	80	112	168	34	-	20	395
2001-02	Virginia Commonwealth University	28	164	328	8	25	108	141	228	34	1	27	444
2002-03	Virginia Commonwealth University	23	151	292	3	11	125	168	247	45	1	29	430
Career		109	584	1210	40	119	364	491	799	155	3	99	1572
