= Grace Beyer =

American basketball player (born 2000s)

Personal information
- Born: c. 2001 (age 24–25)
- Listed height: 5 ft 8 in (1.73 m)

Career information
- High school: Mukwonago (Mukwonago, Wisconsin)
- College: UHSP (2019–2024)
- WNBA draft: 2024: undrafted
- Position: Point guard

Career highlights
- 3× First-team All-American – NAIA (2022–2024); 3× WBCA All-American (2022–2024); 3× Women's Basketball Academic All-American of the Year (2022–2024); NAIA Academic All-American of the Year (2024); 3× First-team Academic All-America (2022–2024); 4× NAIA season scoring leader (2021–2024); NAIA all-time scoring leader; 3x AMC Player of the Year (2022–2024); 4x All-AMC First Team (2021–2024); All-AMC Third Team (2020); AMC Freshman of the Year (2020); AMC All-Freshman Team (2020)

Grace Beyer is an American former women's college basketball player. While playing for the UHSP Eutectics she established the all-time women's NAIA scoring record as well as the women's four-year college scoring record. She was a three-time NAIA & WBCA All-American, NAIA Academic All-American of the Year, 3-time first team Academic All-America, 3-time Women's Basketball NAIA Academic All-America of the year, five-time All-American Midwest Conference (4-time first team), 3-time AMC Player of the Year, and AMC Freshman of the Year. She led the NAIA in scoring 4 times. She played high school basketball for Mukwonago High School in Mukwonago, Wisconsin, leading the school to the final four of the state tournament all 4 years including 3 consecutive runnerup finishes. Beyer holds the UHSP career, season, and single-game records for points, field goals, free throws and assists. She has recorded the only triple-doubles in school history.

== Early life ==
Beyer is one of three children born to Bob and Julie Beyer. Raised in Eagle, Wisconsin, she began her basketball journey in third grade. In her youth, she practiced her skills at her local YMCA and developed toughness playing against her older brothers Brian and Daniel at home in the driveway. Her father often took her to the YMCA to practice before school.

Beyer's maternal grandfather, Bernard Wenninger, lived with her family for nearly 15 years. His self-medication management began to overwhelm him, leading to her to assist as a caregiver, which required that she learn about the interactions of medicines. She had this responsibility in middle school all the way through high school. This instilled an academic interest in a scientific educational path.

== High school career ==
As a freshman, she helped Mukwonago reach the 2016 Wisconsin Interscholastic Athletic Association (WIAA) Division 1 championship game, where they lost 52–46 to Verona. During the game, Mukwonago held leads of 29–21 and 37–32. Early in the game, Mukwonago coach Rick Kolinske instructed Beyer to continue dribbling for several minutes in the four corners offense to lure Verona out of its zone defense, but Verona did not relent.

She was a unanimous 2017 Wisconsin Basketball Coaches Association Division I All-State selection and a fourth team Associated Press All-State selection. Mukwonago was again runner-up at the state tournament.

Mukwonago reached the 2018 WIAA Division 1 championship game against Appleton North High School after Beyer scored 16 in the semifinal victory over Oak Creek High School. Beyer was a 2018 honorable mention Associated Press All-state honoree and a Wisconsin Basketball Coaches Association Division I All-State honorable mention selection. The NCAA Division I coaches that had recruited her since the seventh grade lost interest as she insisted on balancing a scientific curriculum with her athletics. She got the impression that most felt that science classes with lab hours would make it difficult to fully commit to basketball.

After three straight runner-up finishes, Mukwonago earned the number one seed in 2019 with Beyer entering the state tournament with averages of 13.6 points and 5.7 rebounds per game. The 16 points scored by Beyer in the semifinal against Middleton High School was not enough to earn a fourth consecutive championship game appearance. She repeated as an honorable mention Associated Press All-state honoree. She was also her high school class salutatorian.

== College career ==
=== Freshman year (2019–20) ===
In the 5 years ending in 2019 when Beyer enrolled at UHSP, the Eutectics had won 19 out of 135 games. Beyer earned American Midwest Conference (AMC) Player of the Week honors for her first week as a college basketball player in week one of the 2019–20 season on November 4. In the final week of the season, she posted the school's first triple-double with 27 points, 10 rebounds and 10 assists. It was one of only two triple-doubles by AMC athletes in 2019–20. Beyer went on to earn recognition as 2020 AMC Freshman of the Year, AMC All-Freshman Team and Third-Team All-AMC. Beyer led the team with points per game (17.5), rebounds per game (4.6) and assists with 94. The team set a school record with 10 wins.

=== Sophomore year (2020–21) ===
The Eutectics got a new coach during her sophomore season who convinced her to play much more aggressively on offense. Her grandfather saw her play once as a sophomore when the family made the six-hour drive to St. Louis. On January 4, 2021, Beyer became UHSP's first 40-point scorer when her 40 points surpassed Emi Santhuff's 2014 38-point single-game record performance. On February 4, Beyer pushed her single-season points total to 471, surpassing the 2004 school record of 445 set by Chrissi Glastetter. (Note: Later record books would list Glastetter's total as 435, which was eclipsed by Beyer's 438 freshman season total.) Beyer was a 2021 NAIA All-American honorable mention as a sophomore. She was a 2021 First-Team All-AMC selection. The team achieved a school record 11 wins, while Beyer led the AMC in scoring with 28.7 average. She, in fact, led the NAIA in scoring for the first of four consecutive seasons.

=== Junior year (2021–22) ===
By the conclusion of her junior season, she had swept the single-game (57), single-season (1,019) and career (1,973) school scoring records. In the second game of the season, Beyer scored 43 points to set a new school single-game scoring record, while becoming the fourth Eutectic to surpass 1,000 career points. On December 2, she improved her own single-game scoring record to 45. She eclipsed the career scoring record of 1,263 held by assistant coach Morgan Rose since 2019 on December 4, reaching 1,282 on that day. On December 8, she became her school's first Basketball NAIA Player of the Week and second NAIA Player of the Week in any sport. On December 18, she tallied 57 points for a new single-game school record. On January 8, 2022, she re-broke the school single-season scoring record by raising her total to 529. That season, she led UHSP to a 4 seed in the 2022 AMC tournament, the highest seeding in school history. As a junior, she became the first Academic All-America selection in University of Health Sciences and Pharmacy in St. Louis history when she earned recognition by the College Sports Information Directors of America as the 2022 NAIA Women's Basketball Academic All-America Team Member of the Year after posting 1,019 points with per-game averages of 32.9 points, 6.0 rebounds and 4.2 assists. She was a 2022 First-Team All-AMC selection and AMC Player of the Year honoree after leading the conference in scoring by a wide margin, finishing second in assists and earning conference Player of the Week 10 times. Not only did her point total and average lead the NAIA, but she led the NAIA in both field goals made and free throws made. Beyer was selected as a 2022 Women's Basketball Coaches Association (WBCA) All-American and a 2022 NAIA Women's Basketball First Team All-American.

=== Senior year (2022–23) ===
Beyer held a diverse set of leadership roles including as class president. On January 12, 2023, Beyer posted a school single-game record 59 points (including a record-setting 23–24 free throw shooting performance) to enable UHSP to defeat Columbia College for the first time since joining the AMC in 2014 (before a crowd of 123). UHSP earned a three seed in the 2023 AMC Tournament. Beyer repeated as a 2023 First-Team All-AMC selection and the AMC Player of the Year honoree. She was selected to the inaugural AMC Women's Basketball All-Tournament Team. Beyer repeated as 2023 NAIA Women's Basketball Academic All-America Team Member of the Year as a senior for the renamed College Sports Communicators after posting 937 total points on averages of 32.3 points, 6.4 rebounds and 3.2 assists per game. Her 32.3 average was the highest in the NAIA. Beyer was selected as a 2023 WBCA All-American and a 2023 NAIA Women's Basketball First Team All-American. The season marked the second in a row that the team had 20 or more wins. Although her coach attempted to entice her to use her final year of eligibility with knowledge of the NAIA scoring record, the thing that seemed to entice her into coming back was the publicity that Caitlin Clark was getting for a scoring total that was similar to her own.

=== 5th year (2023–24) ===
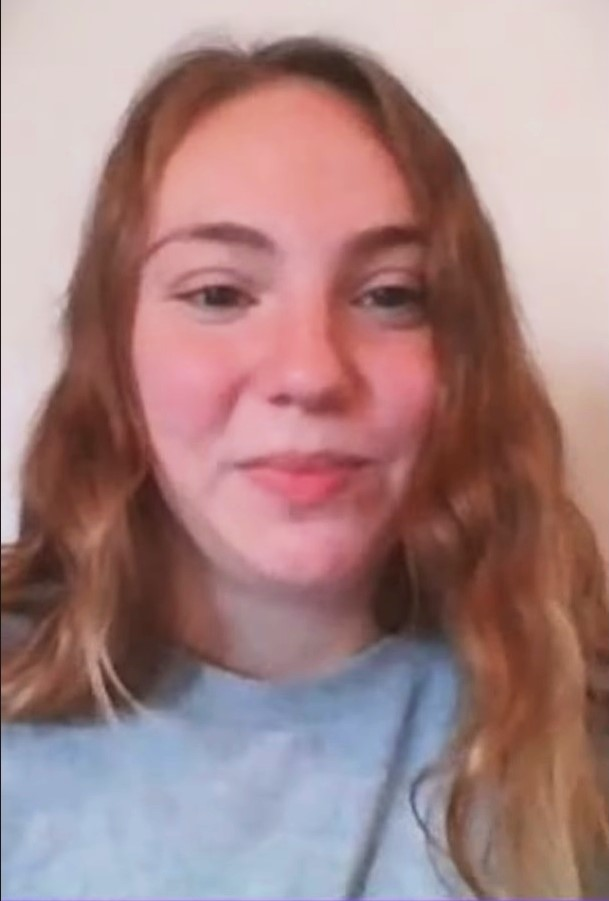
Beyer in December 2023

As of January 22, 2024, her average home game attendance was 59, which is a far cry from the 55,646 that once saw Clark play at Kinnick Stadium or Clark's regular 15,000-fan sellouts at Carver–Hawkeye Arena. In a mid-January 2024 game against Central Baptist College she went 16–16 from the free throw line. On February 24, 2024, Beyer surpassed Miriam Walker-Samuels as the NAIA career scoring record holder by bringing her career total to 3,874 points. On Senior day, Beyer broke a tie with Walker-Samuels at 3,855 with a three-point shot as part of a 32-point performance against Hannibal–LaGrange University. At the time Clark's total was 3,593. Beyer earned recognition for a third time as a 2024 First-Team All-AMC selection and the AMC Player of the Year honoree. On March 2, Beyer posted 33 in her final game, which was the semifinals of the 2024 American Midwest Conference Tournament against Columbia College, while Clark was chasing her 3,961-point total with 3,650 points. Beyer's season high was 54 points in a quarterfinal win over the Missouri Baptist Spartans. The 54 points, which included 24–25 free throw shooting, established new AMC Tournament records for single-game points and free throws, which broke her own records from the 2022 AMC Tournament. Following the tournament, she earned 2024 Women's Basketball All-Tournament Team recognition.

At the conclusion of her career, she finished second among women in college basketball scoring behind Pearl Moore (AIAW Francis Marion/Anderson Junior College, 4,061) and fifth regardless of sex behind John Pierce (NAIA David Lipscomb, 4,230 points), Philip Hutcheson (Lipscomb, 4,106), and Travis Grant (NCAA Division II Kentucky State, 4,045). Beyer was selected as a 2024 WBCA All-American and a 2024 NAIA Women's Basketball First Team All-American. Since 177 of Moore's points were scored for Anderson Junior College, Beyer holds the female record for 4-year college scoring with 3,961 vs. 3,884 for Moore. When Beyer's season ended on March 2, Clark's 2023–24 Iowa Hawkeyes team still had its Senior Day game against Ohio State, the 2024 Big Ten women's basketball tournament and a likely invitation to the 2024 NCAA Division I women's basketball tournament to wait for. After the Ohio State game, Clark had 3,685 points. Clark finished her career with 3,951 points, ten shy of Beyer.

She became the first woman to earn Basketball Academic All-America Team Member of the Year three consecutive times as a 5th-year graduate student posting 1,051 total points at a rate of 35.0 per game. Her career point total of 3,961 broke the 34-year-old NAIA record. She was enrolled in a Doctor of Pharmacy program after having earned an undergraduate degree as a pharmacy major with a 3.97 grade point average (GPA). Her 35.0 average led the nation and her 93.5% free throw percentage was second. She went on to win the 2024 all-sport NAIA Academic All-America Team Member of the Year after earning her fourth consecutive NAIA scoring average title while achieving a 3.90 GPA in her graduate program.

=== Legacy ===
In her time at UHSP, Beyer established and often rebroke her own career records for scoring (3961, previous record 1263), scoring average (29.7 vs. 14.6), field goals made (1190 vs. 401), field goal percentage (44.8% vs. 44.4%), free throws made (1308 vs. 351), free throw percentage (91.2% vs. 86.1%), assists (507 vs. 386), assist average (3.8 vs. 3.5), and triple-doubles (2 vs. 0); single-season records for games played (31 vs. 30), scoring (1051 vs. 438), scoring average (35.0 vs. 22.2), field goals made (306 vs. 140), free throws made (375 vs. 132), free throw percentage (93.9% vs. 90.5%), assists (129 vs. 118), assist average (4.30 vs. 3.93), and triple-doubles (1 vs. 0); and single-game records for scoring (59 vs. 38), field goals made (23 vs. 14), free throws made (24 vs. ?<17), and assists (11 vs. 11). Beyer's single-season three point shot percentage record of 44.9%, min 40 attempts set in 2021 was surpassed in 2024. During her career, she scored at least 29 points in all four games against NCAA Division I opponents.
