= Robert E. Hillard =

Robert Hillard
- Born: November 17, 1917; Saint Paul, Minnesota, U.S.
- Died: March 15, 2000 (aged 82); Caledonia, Missouri, U.S.
- Education: University of Minnesota (BA)
- Known for: Co-founder of Fleishman–Hillard

Robert E. Hillard (November 17, 1917 – March 15, 2000) was an American businessman, public relations executive, and former journalist who co-founded Fleishman–Hillard with his friend and business partner Alfred Fleishman.

== Early life and education ==
Born and raised in Saint Paul, Minnesota, Hillard graduated Phi Beta Kappa and summa cum laude from the University of Minnesota with a bachelor's degree in journalism.

== Career ==
After graduating from college, he worked as a reporter for the Des Moines Register and Tribune, after which he moved to the St. Louis Star-Times.

Hillard served as a United States Navy Lieutenant in the Pacific during World War II. Shortly after the war, he and Fleishman decided to go into business together – the two having met years earlier when Hillard covered the civil courts for the Star-Times, while Fleishman served as deputy court clerk. The firm's first offices were in modest quarters above a St. Louis Woolworth's store.

In the early years, Hillard served as the thinker, strategist, writer, and office manager for the venture while Fleishman focused on working in the community and building the business. Union Electric (now Ameren UE of St. Louis) and Anheuser-Busch were its first clients.

Hillard stepped down as the firm's CEO in 1974, but remained active with the company and its clients until his retirement in 1982. His civic activities included presidency of the Urban League of St. Louis, as well as active involvement with the Health and Welfare Council of Metropolitan St. Louis and the Logos School of St. Louis.

In 1996, Hillard and Fleishman received special lifetime achievement awards from the influential industry publication, Inside PR (now The Holmes Report.) In 1998, Hillard received a special distinguished Alumni Award from the Minnesota Daily, the University of Minnesota newspaper, where he served as editor-in-chief in 1938 and 1939.

In the years following his retirement, Hillard remained active in preserving the culture of the firm he co-founded, serving as Fleishman-Hillard’s unofficial company historian and writing a column for the firm’s employee newsletter.

== Personal life ==
Hillard died in March 2000 at his home in Caledonia, Missouri. He was 82.
