= List of Women's Basketball Academic All-America Team Members of the Year =

Student athlete award

Women's Basketball Academic All-America Team Members of the Year
- Awarded for: The yearly outstanding women's college basketball Academic All-America team member
- Country: United States & Canada
- Presented by: College Sports Communicators

History
- Most recent: Azzi Fudd, UConn; Olivia Reed Thyne, Colorado Mesa; Natalie Gricius, Carroll (WI); Macy Sievers, Dordt
- Next ceremony: April 2027
- Website: academicallamerica.com

The Women's Basketball Academic All-America Team Member of the Year is the annually-awarded most outstanding singular college basketball female athlete selected for the Academic All-America Teams in a given year. The Academic All-America program is selected by the College Sports Communicators (formerly known as College Sports Information Directors of America, or CoSIDA), and recognizes combined athletic performance and academic achievement excellence of the nation's top student-athletes.

From 1996 through 2011, one winner each was chosen from both the College and University Divisions for all twelve Academic All-America teams. The University Division team included eligible participants from National Collegiate Athletic Association (NCAA) Division I member schools, while the College Division team included scholar-athletes from the NCAA Division II, NCAA Division III, National Association of Intercollegiate Athletics (NAIA), Canadian universities and colleges and two-year colleges.

Beginning in 2012, CoSIDA revamped its award structure. The University Division was renamed "Division I", and NCAA Divisions II and III were made their own separate All-American categories. The remaining schools initially still comprised the College Division, but after the 2017–18 school year that was replaced with the NAIA division, restricted to members of that governing body. (Note: The College Division still exists within the CSC Academic All-America program, but awards are only presented in CSC's "at-large" category, encompassing sports in which the organization does not select a dedicated Academic All-America team. See CoSIDA's official calendar for announcement of its 2019–20 Academic All-America honorees.)

Currently, each team selects Academic All-District honorees in eight geographic districts across the United States and Canada. The districts are: District 1 (CT, MA, ME, NH, NY, RI, VT), District 2 (DC, DE, KY, MD, NJ, PA, WV), District 3 (NC, TN, VA), District 4 (AL, FL, GA, PR, SC), District 5 (IL, IN, MI, OH), District 6 (AR, IA, LA, MN, MO, MS, MT, ND, SD, WI, WY), District 7 (CO, ID, KS, NE, NM, NV, OK, TX), and District 8 (AK, AZ, CA, HI, OR, UT, WA, Canada). The All-District honorees make up the All-America team ballots. Currently, all twelve Academic All-American teams (men's and women's basketball, men's and women's soccer, men's and women's track & field, men's baseball, women's softball, men's American football, women's volleyball, men's and women's swimming & diving, men's and women's tennis and men's and women's at-large teams) have one Academic All-American of the Year per division. One of these twelve sport-by-sport Academic All-Americans of the year is selected as the Academic All-America Team Member of the Year for each division. The most recent women's basketball players to have earned the all-sports honor did so in 2024—Caitlin Clark of Iowa in Division I, Samantha Pirosko of Gannon in Division II, and Grace Beyer of UHSP in the NAIA.

== History ==
Three-time winner

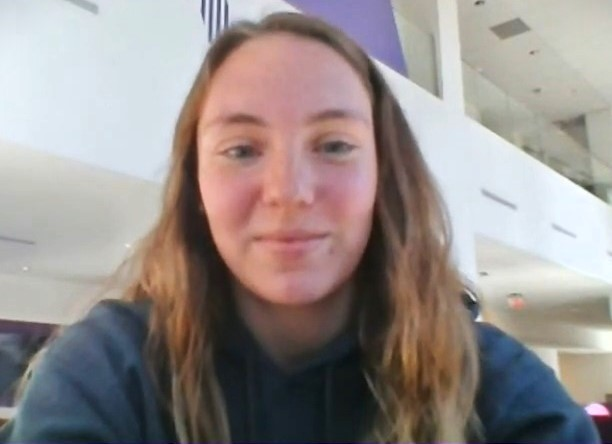
Grace Beyer (pictured in 2024), the 2022–2024 NAIA winner and 2024 NAIA overall winner

Two-time Division I winners

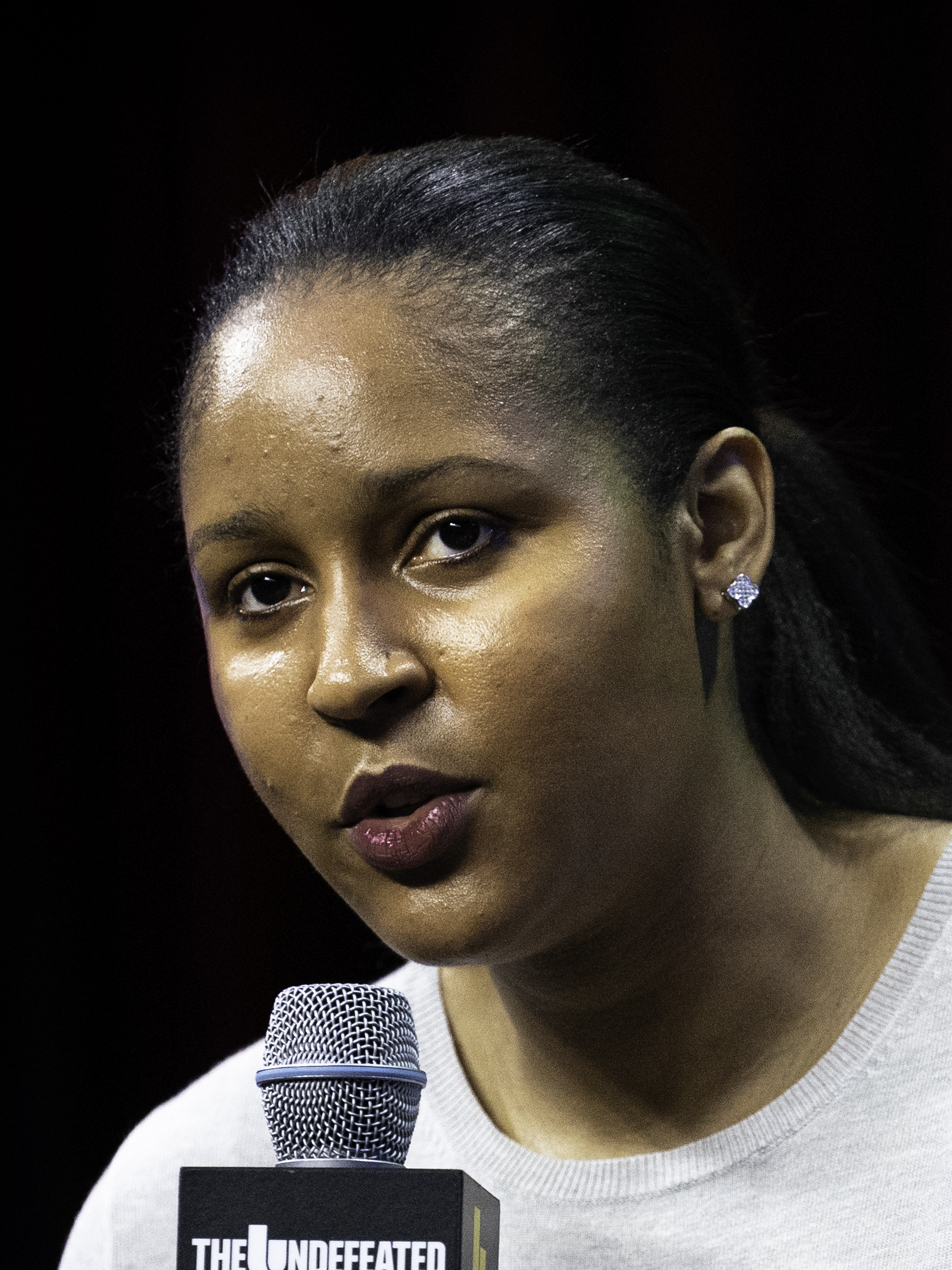
Maya Moore (pictured in 2019), the 2010 winner and 2011 overall winner

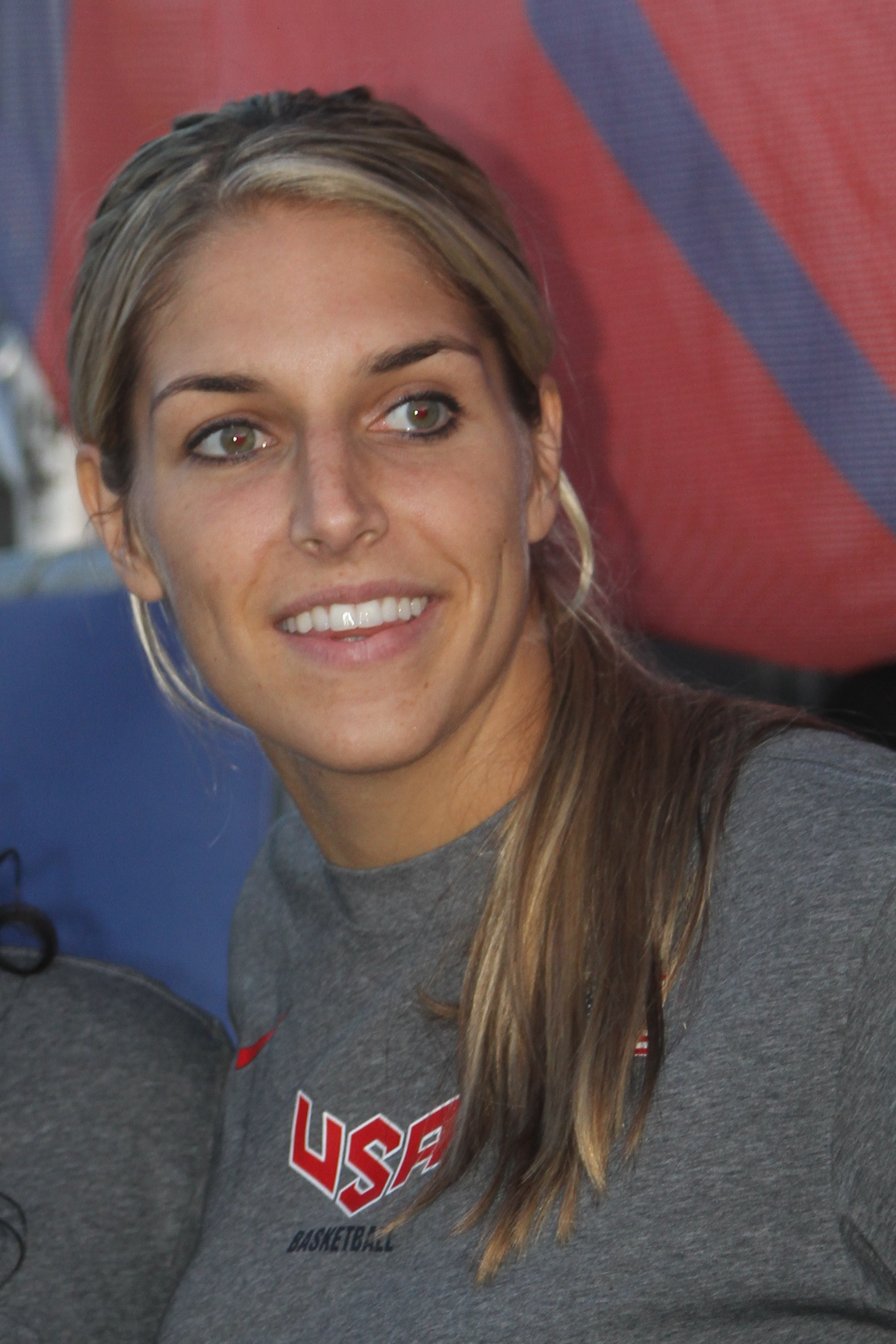
Elena Delle Donne (pictured in 2014), the 2012 and 2013 winner

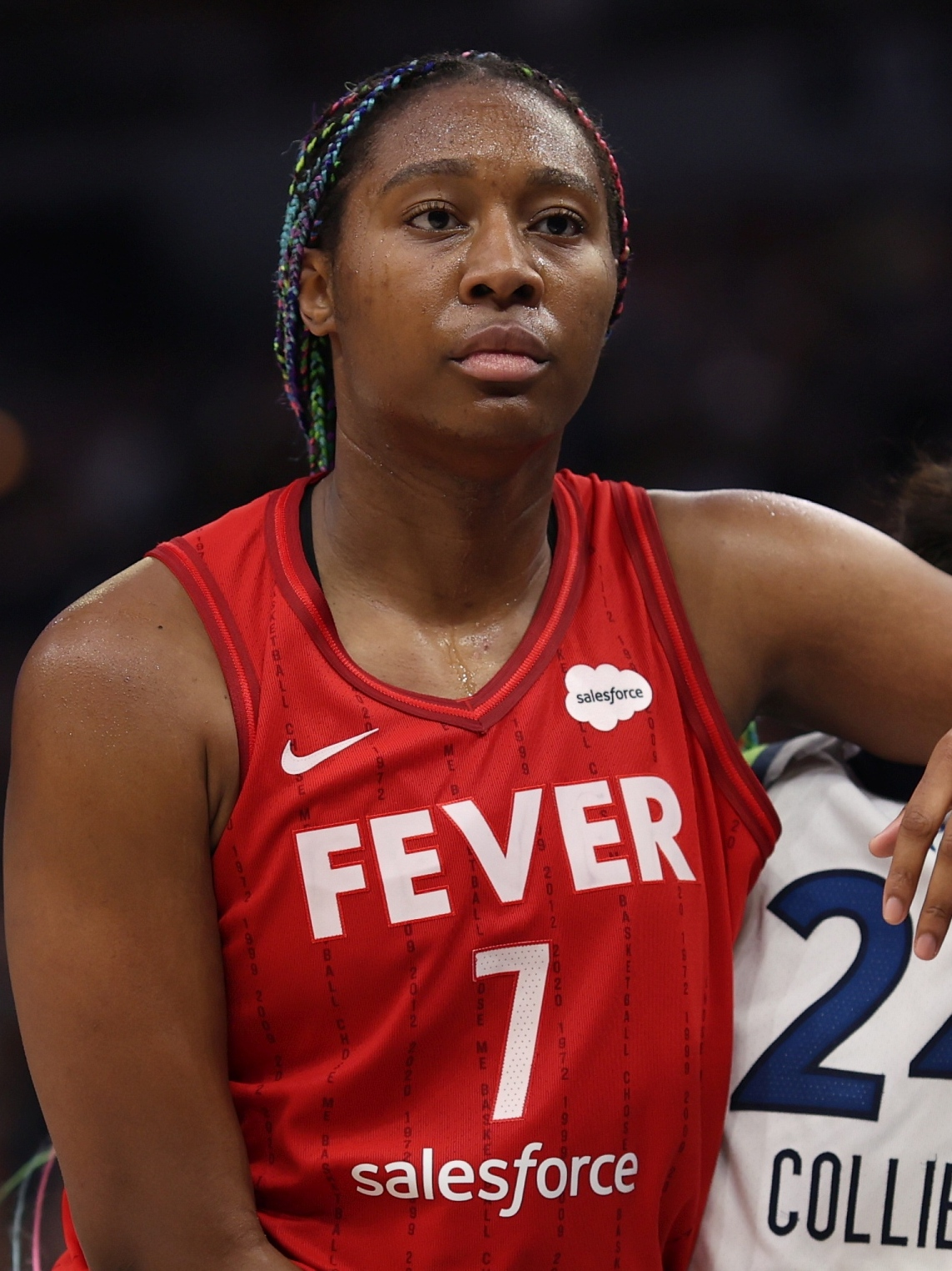
Aliyah Boston (pictured in 2023), the 2021 winner and 2022 overall winner

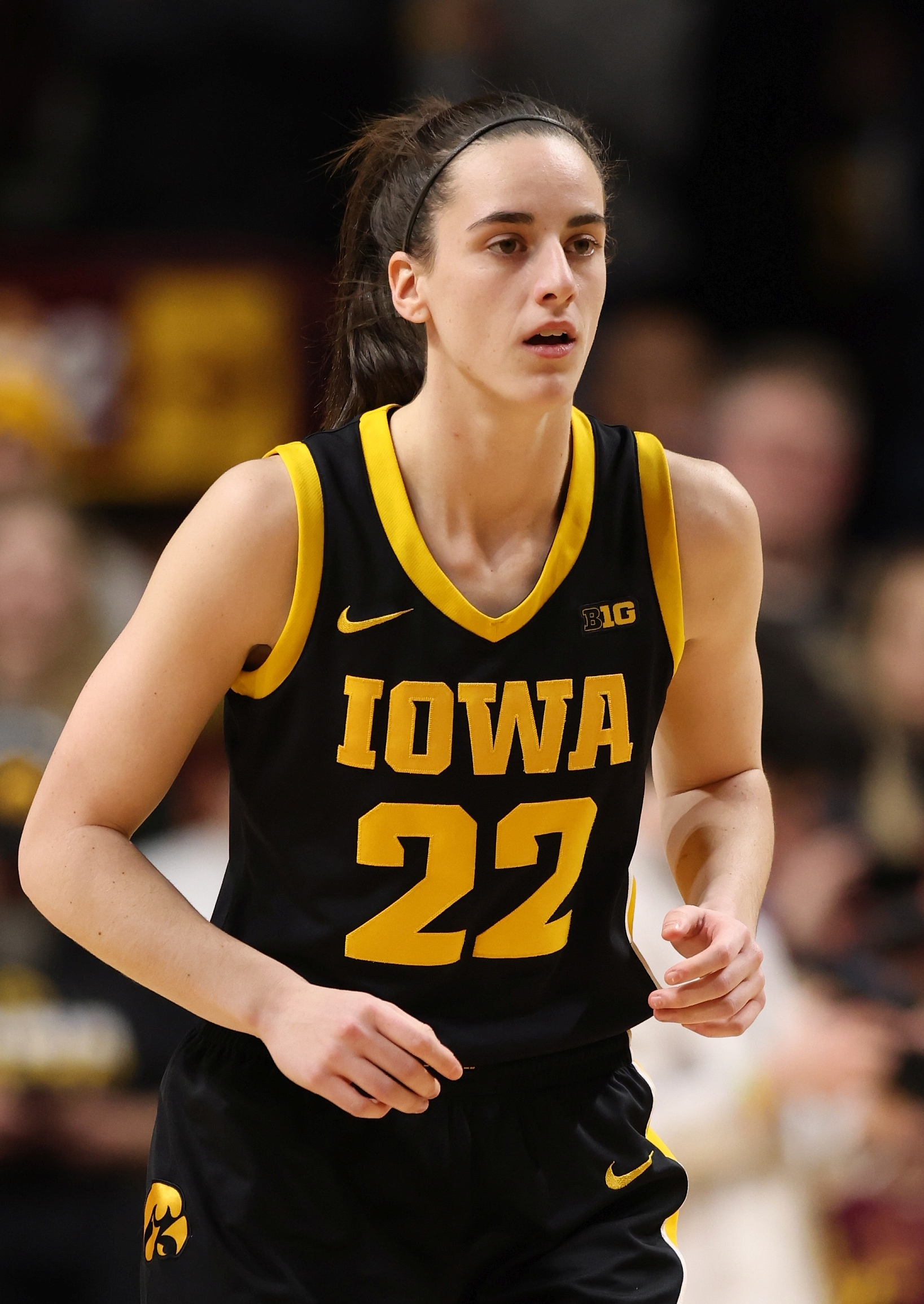
Caitlin Clark (pictured in 2024), the 2023 and 2024 overall winner

As of September 17, 2024, Stanford University has had the most women's basketball Academic All-America honorees (18, and 2 more than Ashland University), but only Chiney Ogwumike has been recognized with this award.

As of April 2025, 13 of the Women's Basketball Academic All-America of the Year winners have gone on to win the overall Academic All-America of the Year. The six Division I overall winners have been Rebecca Lobo (1995, before there were separate awards by level), Ruth Riley (2001), Stacey Dales-Schuman (2002), Maya Moore (2011), Aliyah Boston (2022) and Caitlin Clark (2023 and 2024). Other overall winners have included Kari Daugherty (Division II, 2013), Lauren Battista (Division II, 2014), Samantha Pirosko (Division II, 2024), Grace Barry (NAIA, 2020), and Grace Beyer (NAIA, 2024) as well as Julie Roe (1997) and Emily Bloss (2001) before the College Division was split.

As of April 2025, there have been 12 repeat winners of this award, including 7 times in Division I: Michelle Flamoe (1988 and 1989), Karen Jennings (1992 and 1993), Moore (2010 and 2011), Elena Delle Donne (2012 and 2013), Ally Disterhoft (2016 and 2017), Boston (2021 and 2022), and Clark (2023 and 2024). In the college division Emilie Hanson (1994 and 1995) and Lindsey Dietz (2005 and 2006) repeated; in Division III, Jenna Taylor (2021 and 2022) and Natalie Bruns (2024 and 2025) have repeated. Beyer (NAIA, 2022–2024) was the first three-time recipient in women's basketball.

== Tables of winners ==
Overall Team Members of the Year

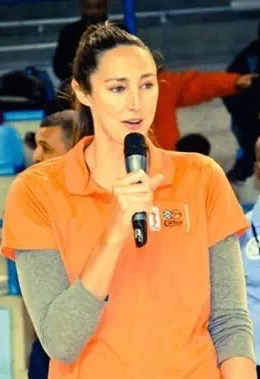
Ruth Riley in 2014
2001 winner

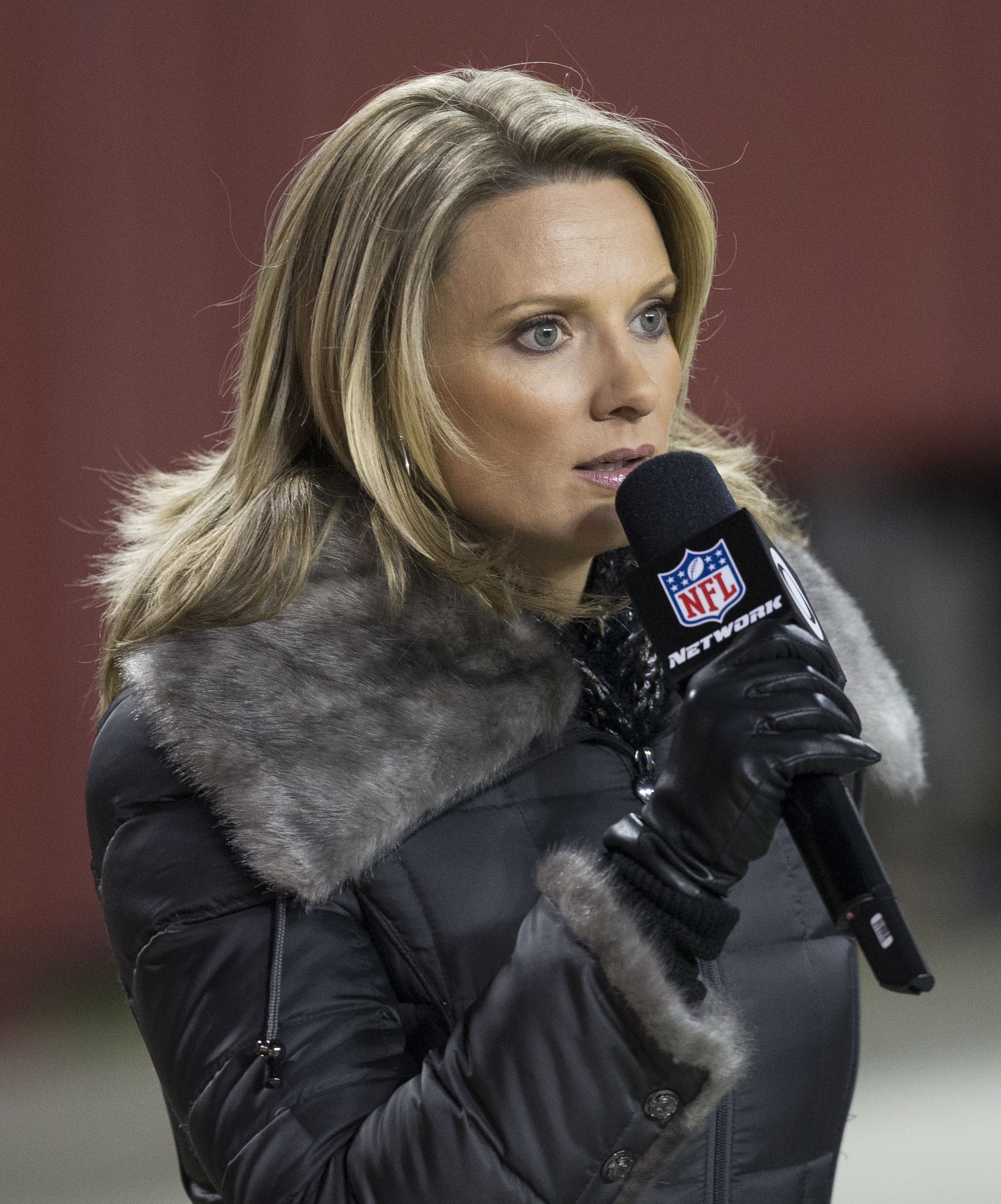
Stacey Dales in 2014
2002 winner

Key
†	Indicates winners of the all-sports Academic All-America award.

All winners are American unless indicated otherwise.

=== Two-division era (1988–2011) ===
Women's Basketball Academic All-America Team Members of the Year (1988–2011)
Year	University Division		College Division	
Year	Winner	School	Winner	School
1988	Michelle Flamoe	Oregon State	Lisa Walters	Minnesota State
1989	Michelle Flamoe (2)	Oregon State	Mary Kate Long	UT Martin
1990	Stephanie Kasperski	Oregon	Laura Van Sickle	Grinnell
1991	Jan Jensen	Drake	Melissa Sharer	Grinnell
1992	Karen Jennings	Nebraska	Barb Blume-Love	Millikin
1993	Karen Jennings (2)	Nebraska	Angela Harbor	Catawba
1994	Kristen Maskala	Marquette	Emilie Hanson	Central (IA)
1995	Rebecca Lobo	UConn	Emilie Hanson (2)	Central (IA)
1996	Jennifer Rizzotti	UConn	Jenny Pracht	Pittsburg State
1997	Jennifer Howard†	NC State	Julie Roe	Millikin
1998	Lisa Davies	Missouri State	Krista Kandere	Saint Rose
1999	Stephanie White-McCarty	Purdue	Jen Swinehart	Baldwin Wallace
2000	Lisa Baswell	Jacksonville State	Alia Fischer	Washington (MO)
2001	Ruth Riley†	Notre Dame	Emily Bloss†>	Emporia State
2002	(Canada) Stacey Dales-Schuman†	Oklahoma	Katie Gariss	Missouri Southern
2003	Kristine Austgulen	VCU	Megan Woodruff	Wilmington (OH)
2004	Kelly Mazzante	Penn State	Mandy Koupal	South Dakota
2005	Kate Endress	Ball State	Lindsey Dietz	Minnesota Duluth
2006	Lindsay Shearer	Kent State	Lindsey Dietz (2)	Minnesota Duluth
2007	Chrissy Givens	Middle Tennessee	Ashley Marble	Southern Maine
2008	Candace Parker	Tennessee	Lindsay Ippel	Millikin
2009	Amber Guffey	Murray State	Emily Brister	West Texas A&M
2010	Maya Moore	UConn	Julia Hirssig	Wisconsin–Stout
2011	Maya Moore (2)†	UConn	Tori Hansen	West Liberty

=== Four-division era (2012–present) ===
Women's Basketball Academic All-America Team Members of the Year (2012–present)
Year	Division I		Division II		Division III		College/NAIA (Note: College Division, 2011–19; NAIA, 2018–present)	
Year	Winner	School	Winner	School	Winner	School	Winner	School
2012	Elena Delle Donne	Delaware	Michelle McDonald	Winona	Carol Cayo	MSOE	Jennifer Jorgensen	Grand View
2013	Elena Delle Donne (2)	Delaware	Kari Daugherty†	Ashland	Carissa Verkaik	Calvin (MI)	Hollie German	Lee
2014	Chiney Ogwumike	Stanford	Lauren Battista†	Bentley	Stephanie Kuzmanic	Carthage	Samantha Kleinsasser	Northwestern (IA)
2015	Ashley Luke	Western Illinois	Suzanna Ohlsen	Seattle Pacific	Heather Johns	Whitman	Morgan Stuut	Saint Xavier
2016	Ally Disterhoft	Iowa	Shelby Winkelmann	Central Missouri	Jess Rheinheimer	Eastern Mennonite	Lydia Nash	Union (KY) (Note: Now known as Union Commonwealth)
2017	Ally Disterhoft (2)	Iowa	Cassidy Mihalko	California Baptist	Lisa Murphy	Carnegie Mellon	Cassidy Deno	Purdue Northwest
2018	Cherise Beynon	New Mexico	Miranda Ristau	Northern State	Samm Chandler	Averett	Amber Alexander	Vanguard
2019	Mikayla Ferenz	Idaho	Jessica Kelliher	Lewis	Hannah Neild	Gallaudet	Kendall Knapke	Indiana Tech
2020	Brittany Brewer	Texas Tech	Cassidy Boensch	Grand Valley State	Sydney Kopp	DePauw	Grace Barry†	Concordia (NE)
2021	(United States Virgin Islands) Aliyah Boston	South Carolina	Sierra Kotchman	Fairmont State	Jenna Taylor	Simpson	Kylah Comley	Sterling (KS)
2022	(United States Virgin Islands) Aliyah Boston (2)	South Carolina	Audrey Tingle	West Liberty	Jenna Taylor (2)	Simpson	Grace Beyer	UHSP
2023	Caitlin Clark†	Iowa	Brooke Olson	Minnesota Duluth	Lexie Dellinger	Anderson (IN)	Grace Beyer (2)	UHSP
2024	Caitlin Clark (2)†	Iowa	Samantha Pirosko†	Gannon	Natalie Bruns	NYU	Grace Beyer (3)†	UHSP
2025	Kiki Iriafen	USC	Grace Foster	Lubbock Christian	Natalie Bruns (2)	NYU	Lilli Frasure	Indiana Wesleyan
2026	Azzi Fudd	UConn	Olivia Reed Thyne	Colorado Mesa	Natalie Gricius	Carroll (WI)	Macy Sievers	Dordt
