= FleishmanHillard =

Public relations and marketing agency

FleishmanHillard Inc.
- Type: Private
- Industry: Public relations
- Founded: 1946; 80 years ago
- Founders: Alfred Fleishman; Robert E. Hillard
- Headquarters: St. Louis, Missouri, United States
- Area served: Worldwide
- Key people: J.J. Carter (President and CEO)
- Parent: Omnicom Group
- Website: fleishmanhillard.com

FleishmanHillard Inc. (formerly, Fleishman–Hillard) is a public relations and marketing agency founded and based in St. Louis, Missouri. It was acquired by Omnicom Group in 1997, becoming part of the Diversified Agency Services (DAS) division. The company was founded in 1946 by Alfred Fleishman and Robert E. Hillard.

In 1994, the company expanded its operations to the Asia Pacific region with an office in Beijing. In May 2013, the company rebranded its name to FleishmanHillard Inc. and launched the slogan "the Power of True". As of April 2021, the company had 78 offices in 30 countries across the Americas, Asia Pacific, Europe, Middle East, and Africa.

== Leadership ==
In January 2024, Hugh Taggart was announced as CEO of Fleishmanhillard in the United Kingdom. In February of the same year, Shin Tanaka, the president of FleishmanHillard in Japan, stepped down after 27 years and was replaced by Ryo Kanayama.

In August 2024, the company announced that CEO John Saunders, who had replaced former CEO then Chairman Emeritus, John Graham in 2006, would be stepping down in October 2024, and would be replaced by J.J. Carter.

== Merger ==
On February 10, 2026, Omnicom Public Relations Group announced that Porter Novelli would be absorbed into FleishmanHillard as a dedicated brand under FleishmanHillard's leadership, following Omnicom Group's November 2025 acquisition of Interpublic Group. JJ Carter continued as Global CEO of the combined agency, with Jillian Janaczek (formerly CEO of Porter Novelli) named Americas CEO. The same restructuring announcement merged Ketchum and Golin to form Golin Ketchum. FleishmanHillard operates as one of four cornerstone networks within OPRG, alongside Golin Ketchum, Weber Shandwick, and MMC.
