= St. Louis Jewish Light =

Jewish newspaper in St. Louis, Missouri

- Type: Biweekly newspaper
- President: Laura K. Silver
- Editor-in-chief: Ellen Futterman
- Founded: 1947
- Headquarters: 6 Millstone Campus, St. Louis, Missouri
- Circulation: 10,000 households (as of 2012)
- ISSN: 0036-2964
- OCLC number: 3919262
- Website: stljewishlight.org

The St. Louis Jewish Light is a biweekly Jewish newspaper distributed in St. Louis, Missouri, that was established in 1947. It is located at 6 Millstone Campus, St. Louis. It is a constituent agency of the Jewish Federation of St. Louis, and has an independent board of directors. Laura K. Silver is President of the Light's Board of Trustees.

== History ==
The first issue was published in 1947. In 1977, it was considered the major Jewish newspaper in St. Louis. In 1988, it was cited as one of the more notable Anglo-Jewish newspapers.

In 2004, its editorial board approved accepting same-sex commitment announcements in the newspaper, by a vote of 9–7. Orthodox board members, joined by some non-Orthodox members, opposed publication of the announcements.

== Circulation and readership ==
In 1991, 78% of the readers of the newspaper said they were interested in news about Israel. In 1992, it had a circulation of 15,000 and a readership estimated at 50,000, and in 2007, it had a circulation of 14,500 households. In 2012, the circulation was approximately 10,000.

== Staff ==
Ellen Futterman is Editor-in-Chief. Betsy Schmidt is Chief Business and Engagement Officer. Robert A. Cohn is Editor-in-Chief Emeritus of the newspaper.
