= College athletics in the United States =

Component of American higher education

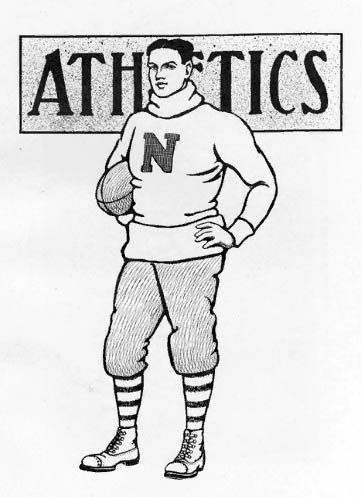
Illustration of a Nebraska Cornhuskers football player published on a 1904 Yearbook

College athletics in the United States or college sports in the United States refers to university and college sport, athletic training and competition, organized and funded by US institutions of tertiary education (US universities and colleges) in a two-tiered system.

The first tier includes the sports that are sanctioned by one of the collegiate sports governing bodies. The major sanctioning organizations include the National Collegiate Athletic Association (NCAA), the National Association of Intercollegiate Athletics (NAIA) and the National Junior College Athletic Association (NJCAA). Individual sports not governed by umbrella organizations like the NCAA, NAIA, and NJCAA are overseen by their own organizations, such as the Inter-Collegiate Sailing Association, National Collegiate Boxing Association, USA Rugby, American College Cricket, National Collegiate Roller Hockey Association and Intercollegiate Rowing Association. Additionally, the first tier is characterized by selective participation since only the elite programs in their sport are able to participate; some colleges offer athletic scholarships to intercollegiate sports competitors. The second tier includes all intramural and recreational sports clubs, which are available to a larger portion of the student body. Competition between student clubs from different colleges, not organized by and therefore not representing the institutions or their faculties, may also be called "intercollegiate" athletics or simply college sports.

Unlike in the rest of the world, in the contemporary United States, many college sports are extremely popular on both regional and national scales, even competing with professional championships for prime-time broadcast, print coverage and for the top athletes. The average university sponsors at least twenty different sports and offers a wide variety of intramural sports as well. During the 2024-25 academic year, 554,298 student-athletes competed in NCAA championship sports, an all-time high and 15,368 more than in 2023-24; schools sponsored 19,928 teams in those sports. The largest collegiate sanctioning organization is the NCAA, and the sport that most schools participate in is basketball, with 2,197 men's and women's basketball teams at all levels. A close second is cross country (with 2,065 NCAA teams) and baseball/softball is third (1,952).

Principles for intercollegiate athletics include "gender equity, sportsmanship, and ethical conduct, sound academic standards, nondiscrimination, diversity within governance, rules compliance, amateurism, competitive equity, recruiting, eligibility, financial aid, playing and practice seasons, postseason competition and contests sponsored by noncollegiate organizations, and the economy of athletic program operations to ensure fair play and equality throughout all college athletic programs and associations."

== Beginnings ==
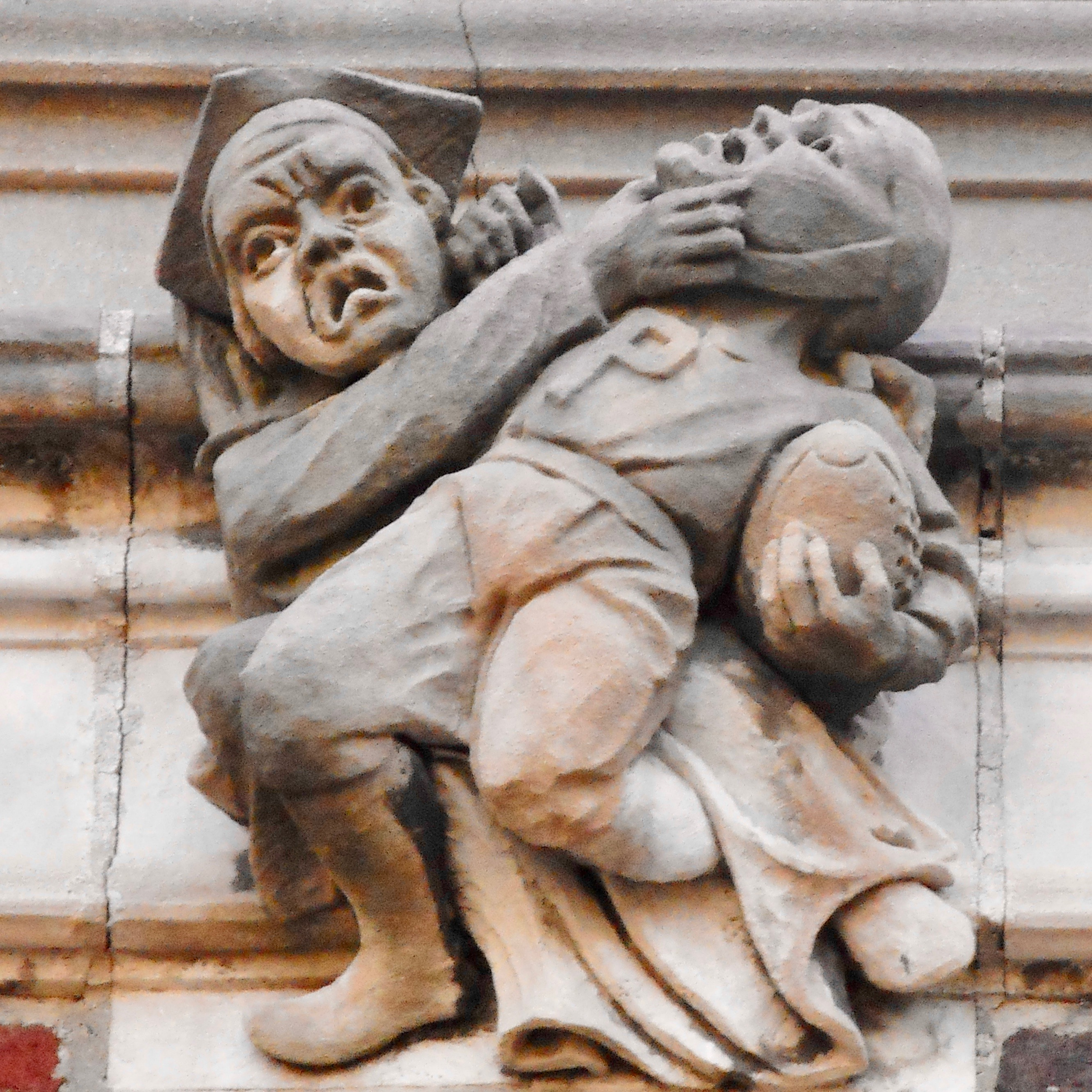
Humorous sculpture depicting an "academics vs. sports" (represented by a graduate and a football player respectively) fight. The sculpture is located at The Eating Clubs of Princeton University

College sports in the United States takes its origins from the early 19th century varsity matches between Oxford University and Cambridge University in England, where The University Match in cricket first took place in 1827, The Boat Race was first contested in 1829, and the first Inter-‘Varsity Sports, also called the Cambridge and Oxford Athletic Games, were held in 1864.

Organized college sports at university level began in the United States when Yale University founded its boat club in 1843. Harvard University followed in their footsteps, establishing their boat club a year later. These boat clubs participated in rowing races called Regattas. The creation of these organizations set the stage for the first intercollegiate sporting event in the U.S. This event took place in 1852, when the rowing team from Yale competed against the rowing team from Harvard at Lake Winnipesaukee, New Hampshire. This marked the beginning of intercollegiate competition and was followed by the creation of numerous college athletic organizations. This historic race sparked the venerable rivalry between the two schools, and the Yale-Harvard Regatta is considered the cornerstone of intercollegiate athletic competition in the United States.

In the late 1840s, bat and ball games had started to become highly known and the sport of baseball was starting to become an establishment at U.S. universities. The first intercollegiate baseball game took place in 1859 between Amherst College and Williams College. The popularity of collegiate baseball increased from this point, and by 1870, college teams were playing extensive schedules. In 1879, the first official intercollegiate baseball league was formed. The first intercollegiate cricket match took place in 1860 between Franklin & Marshall College and Millersville State Normal School. Track and field also grew in popularity during this time, and the first intercollegiate track and field event occurred in 1873. This competition featured a two-mile race between athletes from Amherst College, Cornell University, and McGill University of Montreal, Quebec, Canada. The first intercollegiate football (soccer) game between teams from Rutgers College (now Rutgers University) and the College of New Jersey (now Princeton University) took place on November 6, 1869, at College Field (now the site of the College Avenue Gymnasium at Rutgers University) in New Brunswick, New Jersey. The first intercollegiate rugby football game took place on May 15, 1874, at Cambridge, Massachusetts, when Harvard played against McGill University. (Note: The Scottish Varsity match in rugby football was first played in the 1860s. The Oxford-Cambridge varsity matches in rugby football and association football were first held in 1872 and 1874 respectively although association football at Oxford and Cambridge colleges dates back much earlier.)

== Organization ==
In addition to the National Collegiate Athletic Association (NCAA), there are other collegiate multi-sport athletic organizations, some of which also have hundreds of member schools. These include:

- The California Community College Athletic Association or CCCAA, 107 members, over 25,000 athletes
- The National Junior College Athletic Association or NJCAA
  - Division 1, 221 teams
  - Division 2, 117 teams
  - Division 3, 98 teams
- The National Christian College Athletic Association or NCCAA
  - Division 1, 69 teams
  - Division 2, 43 teams
- The National Intramural and Recreational Sports Association or NIRSA, more than 4,500 members
- The United States Collegiate Athletic Association or USCAA
  - Division 1, 85 members
  - Division 2, (basketball, men's and women's soccer, women's volleyball)
- The National Association of Intercollegiate Athletics or NAIA, 251 members
  - From 1992 to 2020, the NAIA was organized into Divisions I and II for men's and women's basketball only, distinguished from one another by scholarship policies (D-I schools had a higher limit on basketball scholarships, with some D-II schools awarding fewer scholarships ). In the final season of the divisional split (2019–20), roughly two-thirds of NAIA members were D-I. NAIA basketball returned to a single-division format after that season.
- The Northwest Athletic Conference or NWAC, 36 members (35 in the U.S. and 1 in the Canadian province of British Columbia)

There are a number of single sport-organizations, including leagues and conferences (see "List of college athletic conferences in the United States"), as well as governing bodies that sponsor collegiate championships (see "Intercollegiate sports team champions").

== The role of intercollegiate athletics at U.S. universities ==
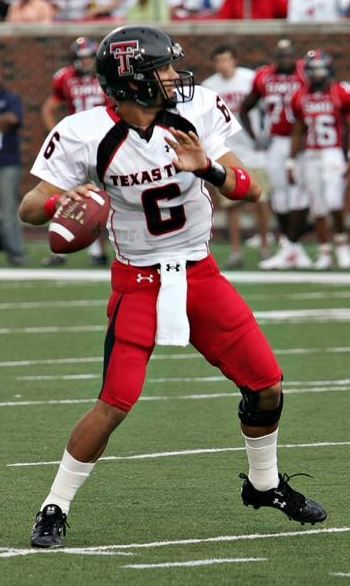
Graham Harrell, former college football player

During the early 1840s, student-athletes contributed actively to all phases of administration and control. Student athletes were involved in the sporting process, made athletic procedures and regulations for universities and also played an important role in determining which sporting events would and would not happen on universities. Today, the kind of involvement on the part of the athlete is virtually unheard of, with the only remnants of student participation in athlete administration being programs in which student governments have some control over the distribution of free allocations to athletics. Furthermore, this movement today focuses on the role of intercollegiate sports in the United States rather than the contributions of the student athlete.

Academic curriculum and requirements affect student athletes:

"When academic and athletic departments have conflicting aims, problems arise that affect the entire institution. American society values the elitism of academics and athletics in a manner that provokes conflict for participants in both domains. At various colleges, it is believed that academic elitism can be constructed on athletic elitism: Athletic teams aspire to be national champions, while their affiliate academic institutions seek national rankings. However, the means by which coaches and faculty achieve national reputations can create conflict for student athletes attempting to exist in both environments. Although both aspire to excel, the different measures of excellence for academics and athletics necessitates compromise by those who are placed in both settings." This policy, attempted by a large number of colleges, works for only a few.

College administrators have the challenge of balancing university values while maximizing the revenue generated by their athletic department. To maintain financial sustainability, several athletic directors have stated that the elimination of men's nonrevenue programs is the only way to balance their athletic budgets. Men's nonrevenue sport teams will likely be facing declining financial support in future generations.

"Division I institutions are required to have seven athletic teams for men and seven for women (or six for men and eight for women). As well, there must be two team sports for each gender, and each gender must have a team in each of the three seasons (i. e., Fall, Winter, Spring). Excluding basketball and football, teams must play 100% of their minimum number of games against Division I opponents, and 50% of games above the minimum number must be played against Division I teams. Men's and women's basketball teams must play all but two of their contests against Division I opponents, and men must play at least one third of their games in their home arena. In Division I, football is further sectioned into FBS (NCAA Division I Football Bowl Subdivision), and FCS (Football Championship Subdivision). FBS schools must play at least 60% of their games against other FBS opponents, and demonstrate their ability to attract a high level of spectatorship." Additionally, college football bowl eligibility rules mandate that only one win over an FCS team can be counted toward the six required for eligibility; this in turn means that FBS teams typically schedule at most one game against an FCS team in a given season.

== Popularity and importance of intercollegiate athletics ==
College athletics has been popular since the 1920s and its popularity has increased as the games are being televised. Also, college sports are important both culturally and economically. Intercollegiate athletics creates a culturally and racially diverse setting for academics and athletics. Economically some schools are benefiting from their athletic programs through ticket sales, merchandise sales, and outside donations.

College sports in the United States is measured by the large number of universities that participate in more than 24 different NCAA sports. Even in the late 1980s, the average Division I program employed over 75 coaches, trainers, and administrative staff as full-time faculty to support their athletic programs.

NCAA Division I, II and NAIA schools offer scholarships to well over 200,000 athletes. Every year these D-I, D-II, NAIA schools spend over $4 billion in athletic-scholarships. American college sports are popular worldwide: in NCAA D-I and D-II alone, 20,000 international student-athletes were participating in college athletics in 2017, and by 2022 that number had reached 25,000.

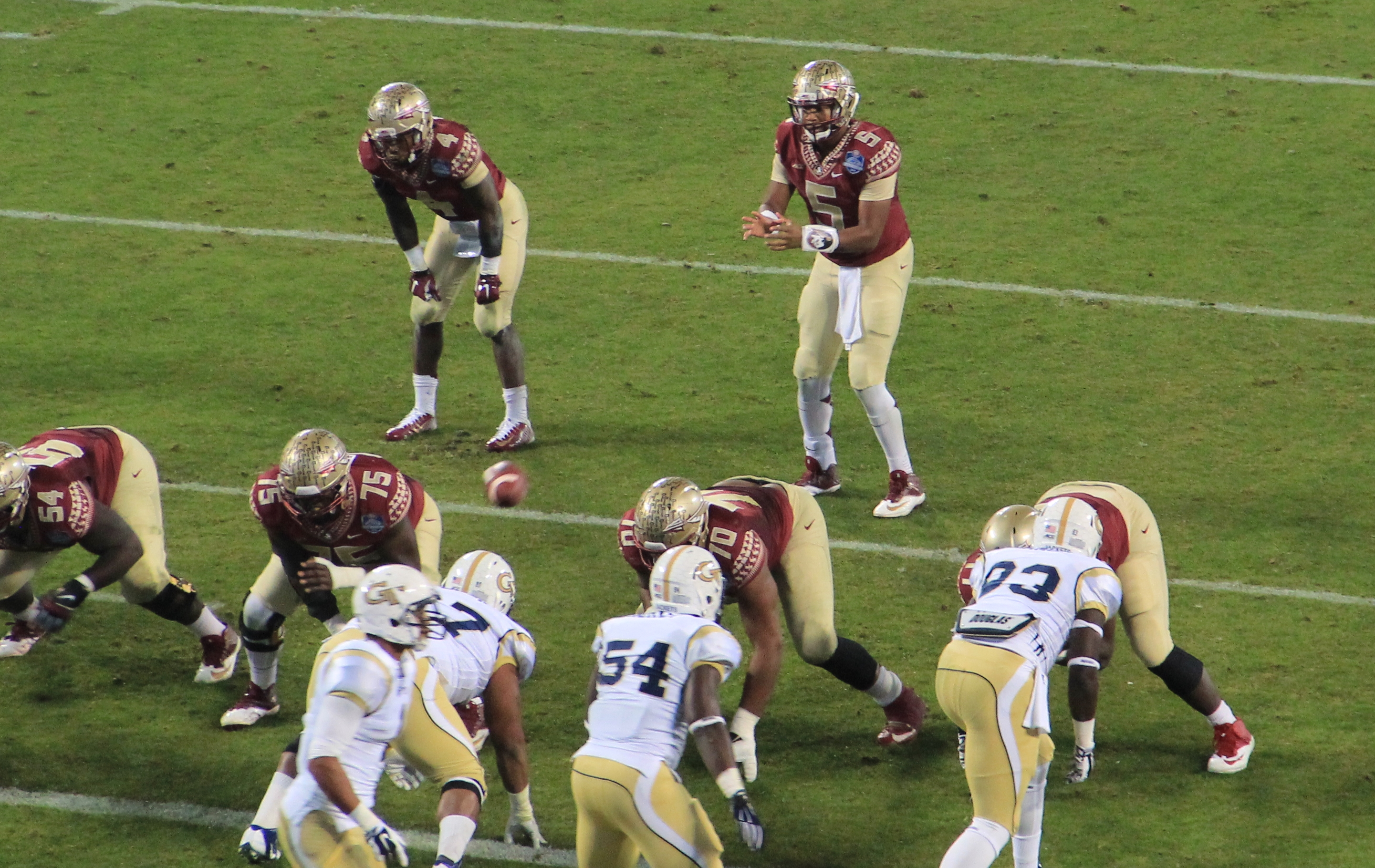
The Florida State Seminoles and Georgia Tech Yellow Jackets during the 2014 ACC Championship Game

College attendance records by sport
| College sport | Attendance | Event |
|---|---|---|
| Baseball | 40,106 | Houston at San Diego State, 2004 (Note: This game, although designated as a San Diego State home game, was played at the San Diego Padres' home of Petco Park.) |
| Basketball | 79,444 (men) | 2014 NCAA semi-finals |
| Basketball | 55,646 (women) | Crossover at Kinnick, 2023 (exhibition) – DePaul at Iowa (Note: These events were held at Iowa's football stadium.) |
| Football | 156,990 | Battle at Bristol, 2016 – Virginia Tech vs Tennessee (Note: This event was held at a NASCAR track.) |
| Ice hockey | 113,411 | The Big Chill at the Big House – Michigan State at Michigan, 2010 (Note: This game was played at Michigan's football stadium.) |
| Wrestling | 42,287 | Grapple on the Gridiron, 2016 |
| Soccer | 25,433 (women) | Soccer at Sanford – James Madison at Georgia, 2026 (Note: This event took place at Georgia's football stadium.) |
| Soccer | 22,512 (men) | SIU Edwardsville at Saint Louis, 1980 (Note: This match was held at the second Busch Stadium, then home to St. Louis' MLB and NFL teams.) |
| Softball | 13,207 | California at Stanford, 2025 (Note: This game was played at Stanford's football stadium.) |
| Volleyball | 92,003 | Volleyball Day in Nebraska, 2023 – Omaha at Nebraska (women) (Note: This match was played at Nebraska's football stadium.) |

Another reason for the importance of college athletics in the U.S. is the important role it plays in the hierarchy of sport organizations. In his article about collegiate sports programs, Thomas Rosandich refers to a "performance pyramid", which shows the general progression of athletic organizations in the United States. At the bottom of this pyramid is youth sports organizations, since these organizations have participation open to nearly everyone. As the pyramid progresses, the level of competition increases, while the number of competitors decreases until the highest level of organized sport, professional sports, is reached. In many respects, the intercollegiate sports level serves as a feeder system to the professional level, as the elite college athletes are chosen to compete at the next level. This system differs greatly from nearly all other countries in the world, which generally have government-funded sports organizations that serve as a feeder system for professional competition.

=== History and growth of college sports ===
Before 1910 sports were not strictly regulated which caused a number of injuries to the athletes and in some severe cases death. President Roosevelt took action and formed the Intercollegiate Athletic Association (IAA) which is now known as the NCAA. The NCAA was put into place to create rules for intercollegiate sports. During the 1920s–1950s there was still not much regulation of sports and the NCAA created the Committee on Infractions to replace the Sanity Code in 1951. This committee was created to give some structure to the recruitment process. The NCAA also wanted to improve competition between schools, so it began dividing schools into divisions by competitive ability in 1956, placing the most competitive programs in the University Division and all others in the College Division. In 1973, the University Division was renamed Division I, and the College Division was split in two on the basis of scholarship policies. College Division schools that wished to continue offering athletic scholarships, or compete in all sports against such schools, were placed in Division II or in the National Association of Intercollegiate Athletics. Schools that chose not to award athletic scholarships were placed in Division III. Throughout the 1980s and 90s college athletics grew along with the revenue because of the game being shown on television.

== Revenues and expenses ==
There are large amounts of money gained from Division I athletics, but only a small number of schools benefits from their programs. During 2014 the NCAA earned $989 million in revenue, with a profit around $80.5 million. Each year television, advertisements, and licensing revenue also adds to the NCAA profit, but donations, ticket sales, and merchandise sales goes to the school. From marketing and television fees the NCAA gained nearly $753.5 million in 2014. In 2010, two of the most profitable college conferences—the Southeastern Conference (SEC) and the Big Ten—earned over $1 billion and $905 million, respectively. The University of Texas' football program, which was the most valuable in college sports in the early 2010s, was estimated by Forbes to be worth over $133 million in 2013, totaling over $1 billion in the previous 10 years. At that time Texas made, on average, $93 million a year just from the football program. The two schools that followed Texas, Georgia and Penn State, each made around $70 million a year. Another prominent football program, Notre Dame, has a contract with NBC to televise its home football games for $15 million a year through 2025. The average revenue per conference in 1999 was $13.5 million.

Universities spend a very large amount of money on their college organizations in the facilities, coaches, equipment, and other aspects. In most states, the person with the highest taxpayer-provided base salary is a public college football or basketball coach. This figure does not include coaches at private colleges.

By 2015, most Division I schools had established single-source contracts, which supply the university with apparel for all athletic programs, sometimes including cheerleading squads and dance teams, which compete outside the NCAA structure. The contract deal made college history when the University of Michigan and Nike made an 11-year contract deal for almost $200 million.

Many athletic programs do not make enough money to cover the cost to maintain those programs, so they use student fees to fund their programs. This could cause some problems because of the increase in student debt and limited academic budgets. As of 2016 only 23 out of 228 Division I programs earned enough money to make up for their extreme spending. Due to donations, 16 of the 23 schools were able to cover their expenses, so truly only 7 of the 228 universities broke even due to their athletic programs. For the other 203 schools that did not break even, they are partially funded by the state or student fees. Most of the money that is being spent is used to pay the coaching staff, for the games, and the top-of-the-line facilities. The amount spent on an athlete is seven times more than the average amount spent per student. At big Division I programs, the amount of money that is spent on a football player exceeds $90,000.

== Title IX ==
Title IX (of the Education Amendments of 1972) — which requires gender equity for boys and girls in every educational program that receives federal funding – has specifically made an impact on the distribution of college athletes by sex since its passing in 1972. The law states that:

No person in the United States shall, on the basis of sex, be excluded from participation in, be denied the benefits of, or be subjected to discrimination under any education program or activity receiving federal financial assistance ...

— United States Code Section 20,

In 1975, the final clause of Title IX was signed into law and included provisions prohibiting sex discrimination in athletics. The regulations pertaining to athletics require that an institution which sponsors interscholastic, intercollegiate, club or intramural athletics shall provide "equal athletic opportunity" for members of both sexes.

Since the passing of Title IX, many NCAA institutions have had problems with the compliance of these regulations. To successfully comply with Title IX requirements, NCAA institutions must meet one of the requirements in the "three prong test" as follows:

1. Prong one – Provide athletic participation opportunities that are substantially proportionate to student enrollment. This part of the test is satisfied when participation opportunities for men and women are "substantially proportionate" to their respective undergraduate enrollment.
2. Prong two – Demonstrate a continual expansion of athletic opportunities for the underrepresented sex. This part of the test is satisfied when an institution has a history and continuing practice of program expansion that is responsive to the developing interests and abilities of the underrepresented sex (typically female).
3. Prong three – Full and effective accommodation of the interest and ability of underrepresented sex. This part of the test is satisfied when an institution is meeting the interests and abilities of its female students even where there are disproportionately fewer females than males participating in sports.

OCR (Office of Civil Rights) is one of the governing bodies that attempts to ensure that title IX is enforced. They have the power to pull federal funding from schools or organizations that are found to be noncompliant with title IX, although this power has never been exercised. The OCR will usually work with the school or organization that is noncompliant to set up a schedule or plan to follow to become compliant.

Research concerning Title IX institutional compliance and gender equity issues has found that:

- Division I nonfootball schools (formerly known as Division I-AAA) are more likely to comply with Title IX requirements than Division I FBS (formerly I-A) or Division I FCS (formerly I-AA) schools, which sponsor football.
- Smaller institutions are more likely than larger institutions to be in compliance with Title IX.
- Southern schools are less likely to comply with requirements.
- The attitudes of key individuals (i.e., university president or athletic director) are critical components in determining whether an institution's athletic program complies with Title IX.
- A college's reputation for academic integrity and for success in women's athletics suggests greater enthusiasm towards creating equal athletic opportunities for women.

=== Impact on college sports ===
The Association for Intercollegiate Athletics for Women (AIAW) was founded in 1971, evolving out of the Commission on Intercollegiate Athletics for Women founded in 1967. In its peak, the AIAW had almost 1,000 member schools. The National Junior College Athletic Association established a women's division in 1975. In the early 1980s, the National Association of Intercollegiate Athletics and the National Collegiate Athletic Association began sponsoring intercollegiate championships for women, and, following one year of direct rivalry in the form of competing championship events, the AIAW discontinued operation after the 1981–82 season.

Title IX has had a considerable impact on college athletics. Since its passing, Title IX has allowed for female participation to almost double in college sports. Before the law was passed in 1972 fewer than 30,000 girls participated in college sports; as of 2011 more than 200,000 girls participated in college sports. Title IX has been both credited with and blamed for a lot of things that have happened in college athletics since 1972.

Studies on the gender equity of sports found on college campuses have provided an examination of how Title IX is perceived. Questions have been raised over the equity between male and female student athletes. Females, regardless of whether an administrator, coach, or athlete, thought there to be less equity than males when it comes to these five factors: program support, financial support, sports offerings, scheduling, and changes in the past two to three years.

In regards to the concept of "pay-for-play," (see section below, "Debate over paying athletes") Title IX is generally seen as a substantial roadblock, only because of the differences between big-time men's sports (football/men's basketball) and women's sports, but also because of the gap between those "big two" sports' profit-producing programs and virtually all other collegiate sports, both male and female. Depending on how one views "pay for play," this can be either a positive of negative effect of Title IX.

Increases in opportunities for male coaches, however, have resulted from Title IX legislation. Before Title IX, 90 percent of women's intercollegiate teams were coached by women. By 1978, when all educational institutions were required to comply with Title IX, the percentage of same-sex coaching had plunged to 58 percent. Although the actual number of female coaches increased between 1979 and 1986, the percentage of female coaches continued to decline over that same period. The all-time low of 47 percent of women coaching female sports was achieved in 1990. In addition, although men have broken into coaching female athletes, female coaches have not experienced the same opportunities to coach male athletes. In 1972, 99 percent of collegiate men's teams were coached by men, and the same is true today.

== Debate over paying athletes ==
=== Professional pay ===
Since the turn of the 21st century, a debate has arisen over whether college athletes should be paid. Although the earliest of star athletes were known to have received a variety of types of compensation (including endorsement fees), benefits to college athletes outside of academic scholarships have largely been prohibited under NCAA governance. In the 21st century, the high, rising income paid to some colleges by the media for transmitting games to their television audiences, has led some people to complain that the athletes should share in the colleges income.

There are arguments in favor of paying athletes. A few schools benefit from owning their own networks. The University of Texas owns The Longhorn Network and Brigham Young University owns BYUtv.

Paying college athletes would present several legal issues for the NCAA and its member institutions. If paid, the athletes would lose their amateur status and become university employees. As employees, these athletes would be entitled the National Labor Relations Act to form or join labor organizations and collectively bargain. Advocacy groups for college players could certify as a union given the revenue involved in college athletics." Collegiate sports is not a career or profession, paying college athletes would present issues under Title IX, which requires that institutions accepting federal funds offer equal opportunities to men and women."

About one in ten college teams help to generate a large net amount of revenue for their school, but the athletes are not personally rewarded for their contribution. This money is spread through administrators, athletic directors, coaches, media outlets, and other parties. None is given directly to the players. Collegiate athletics entails time-consuming, intense commitment to practice and play. Only some athletic scholarships are "full rides", and many student-athletes are not able to afford dining, entertainment, and even some educational expenses. Outside of summertime, when work is permitted, student-athletes have no extra time for work in addition to practice, training, and classes. Paying student-athletes would give the athletes an incentive to stay in school and complete their degree programs, rather than leave early for the professional leagues. They would be much less tempted to earn money by taking illegal payments and shaving points. By not paying their athletes, colleges avoid paying workmen's-compensation benefits to the "hundreds" of college athletes incapacitated by injuries each year. Furthermore, if an athlete receives a serious injury while on the field, the scholarship does not pay for the bill of the surgery.

Colleges such as University of Connecticut (UConn), Syracuse University, and Kansas State University have had low graduation rates for their student-athletes. UConn had a 25% graduation rate until recently as it rose to 50%. UConn received $1.4 million competing in the NCAA tournament. One argument is that paying these athletes would give them an incentive to stay and finish college.

In 2013, Steve Spurrier, the head football coach of the South Carolina Gamecocks, said that all 28 men's football and basketball coaches in South Carolina's conference, the SEC, favored paying athletes up to $300 per game for football players and a little less for basketball players. It would cost the SEC about $280,000 per year.

Jalen Rose has a similar view to Spurrier's, as he believes that student athletes should be given a stipend of $2500 per semester.

The College Athletes Players Association (CAPA) focuses on the idea of giving compensation to football and basketball players. The CACA has not decided if this will affect sports that do not make money for schools. The NCAA has rejected the definition of student-athletes as "employees".

Several college athletes have been accused of financial improprieties, including Reggie Bush, Cam Newton, and Johnny Manziel.

A USA Today article takes issue with the critics because the terms had been drawn up by the colleges:

For college athletes to be held to the terms and conditions of a one-year scholarship that have been set by the very authorities who financially benefit the most and render the athletes involved voiceless in the process is a glaring conflict of interest. In an article by usa today they state "Players in the NCAA's top-tier Division I bowl subdivision say they devote more than 43 hours a week to the sport during the season, and those in a couple of other sports — baseball and men's basketball — approach that commitment, an NCAA study shows." (Wieberg, USA Today) ... The conditions of the athletic scholarship and transfer rules, prohibitions against agents, limits on due process, failure to deliver on the promise to educate, the unobstructed selling of athlete images, and the like are tools of exploitation that benefit college sport leaders while oppressing those who perform on the field.

Because of their demanding schedules, most athletes have no time to make any additional money, making it difficult to help support needy family members. In 2010 ESPN published an article about Ohio State football players that had been sanctioned by the NCAA for accepting free tattoos and selling memorabilia they had earned. However, there are many that argue that student athletes selling of personal and earned memorabilia is their right, with gray-areas where which the NCAA has a hard time justifying their punishments.

==== Court cases ====
After a number of efforts to go to trial against the NCAA's incoming revenue, a court date has been set. Former UCLA Bruin Ed O'Bannon along with Oscar Robertson and Bill Russell lead the lawsuit. The trial is scheduled to begin during the summer of 2014. Although the NCAA claims that their athletes have amateur status, the organization has made billions of dollars off of merchandise licenses. The NCAA has earned billions from broadcast revenues annually. By selling the image of their players, the NCAA is able to make money from each sport. O'Bannon has stated that some of this revenue should be spread out among the players who help bring in this cash to the NCAA. ESPN analyst Jay Bilas showed how a person could search the NCAA website by player name and have the resulting school jersey appear.

The U.S. Court of Appeals for the Ninth Circuit would find that Ed O'Bannon was right in his thesis that the NCAA is taking advantage of a players image. Though the court found this ruling, all that would come of it would be that schools would only have to cover the cost of attendance. This would scrap the injunction found by U.S. District Court Judge Claudia Wilken that division one football and basketball players could receive up to five thousand dollars a year for playing. The Supreme Court would deny to hear the case on appeal, effectively stopping O'Bannon's fight.

In a 2014 court case brought by a few Northwestern University football players against the NCAA, argued that the players should be able to unionize and bargain collectively. The court ruled in the players favor. The court's decision only applied to those football players at Northwestern on a scholarship. Required football practice and playing had reduced the time students could use to pursue their studies. Former player Kain Colter argued that athletic departments should decrease the maximum number of hours a player must participate in a sport to remain part of the team and retain a scholarship. As it stands, 50 hours a week is the maximum.

On June 21, 2021, the U.S. Supreme Court unanimously ruled that the NCAA cannot bar relatively modest payments to student athletes. In June 2025, the U.S. District Court for the Northern District of California granted final approval to the settlement in House v. NCAA and related antitrust cases concerning restrictions on athlete compensation. Beginning July 1, 2025, participating Division I schools were permitted to make direct payments to athletes under a revenue-sharing model, with an initial annual cap of approximately $20.5 million per institution; the settlement also provided nearly $2.8 billion in back damages.

=== Arguments against paying college athletes ===
College athletes that receive a full scholarship to college already benefit from perks that the general student body does not receive. College athletes are able to take advantage of free room and board, the best dorm rooms on campus, free books and classes, and first choice of classes they want. A college athlete can receive up to $120,000 in total scholarships; they already are being paid for their participation. Adding on to the monetary argument are the opinions that student-athletes could lose focus on their educational responsibilities.

"The average fair market value of top-tier college football and men's basketball players is over $100,000 each. If college sports shared their revenues the way pro sports do, the average Football Bowl Subdivision player would be worth $121,000 per year, while the average basketball player at that level would be worth $265,000. Out of 332 schools currently competing in the NCAA Division I, fewer than a dozen have athletic departments that are making a profit. 14 of the 120 programs that comprise the Football Bowl Subdivision (FBS) are profitable. 88% of the top football programs in the country are losing money. Most universities are unable to pay for these athletes, along with the coaches and renovations on stadiums, out of money earned from athletics. Kenny Mossman of the University of Oklahoma (OU), estimated that the cost to OU would be $3.6 million a year if stipends were $1,000 a month.

College athletes receive various benefits upon enrolling at their institutions. Some institutions allow student-athletes priority course registration. Student-athletes may also receive academic support services to help maintain eligibility. There is ongoing debate over whether college athletes should receive direct compensation in addition to existing benefits. Student-athletes receive a range of institutional benefits. The cost of attendance at some institutions may exceed $100,000 over four years. Some student-athletes receive scholarships that reduce or eliminate education costs. These benefits may significantly reduce educational expenses. Supporters of the current system argue that existing benefits provide sufficient compensation.

"The NCAA also is setting up a $17 million Student-Athlete Opportunity Fund that has no financial-need restrictions. It's to be used for "educational and developmental opportunities." [Nebraska Proposal, 2009]. This debate has caused certain elite colleges to take caution asking athletes to sign forms that prevent them from suing the college. The signed forms gives the college full imagery benefits, allowing them to use their names to sell team T-shirts and jerseys. Insurance wise – a plan proposed by William E. Kirwan, Ohio State University President, would insure athletes against injuries and mishaps during workouts, practices and games.

Because of title IX, all college athletes would have to be paid, including athletes playing for teams that do not produce a lot of revenue. College sponsored sports would be cut to make a business case for paying athletes work economically. Colleges would still be able to field "club teams" for those sports. "Club team" players almost never receive scholarships and are truly amateur athletes in every sense of the word.

Nonrevenue sports would suffer. Over all the sports available to division one programs, only Football and Basketball actually make a profit, with the exception of Baseball in very few instances. The rest of the sports either break even or, more often than not, cost the school more than they contribute. Larger universities would be the only ones able to pay their football/basketball players while supporting smaller market sports and are very few colleges fall into this category. The colleges that do happen to fall into this category are in five out of the 33 division one conferences. Nonrevenue sports likely will be thinned out, high school athletes will lose the chance to continue competing and a larger emphasis on collegiate competition will take place within the power five conferences.

Further examples of athletes being treated like royalty at their universities can be seen through the University of Oregon. The John E. Jaqua Academic Center for the varsity athletes at the University of Oregon is a 40,000 square foot facility to assist athletes with their education. The extravagant space contains an auditorium with 114 leather seats, dozens of tutoring rooms and academic and life-skill advising offices, a computer and graphics lab, library with study spaces, lounge with large flat-screen televisions and deluxe sofas, as well as a kitchen and café filled with food and new equipment. The staff, technology, and rooms inside the academic center are all reserved for the varsity athletes, who make up 2.5% of the student population at the school. In addition, the 1,700 private tutoring sessions per week are conveniently displayed on a massive screen similar to the screens that display flight information at an airport. Adding to the exclusive treatment the student-athletes receive, the academic center is surrounded by a moat. The athletic facility adds to the royal treatment of the student-athletes. The University of Oregon's football practice facility is 145,000 square feet and contains three indoor practice fields, a two-story weight room, countless whirlpools and medical tables, enormous lockers, and luxurious lounges containing gaming stations and flat-screen televisions. Other amenities at the practice facility include a cafeteria (players receive high quality, tailored, nutritious diets), multiple conference rooms and classrooms, a pool table and barbershop. The student-athletes have luxurious facilities at their disposal, and they are already getting paid in the form of their scholarships.

If full ride scholarships to top universities is not suitable compensation for student-athletes, a college education and degree is being devalued. Student-athletes may heavily invest their time into the sport they play, however, that does not change the worth of their academic degree. Every student-athlete is not going to become a professional athlete, but they are guaranteed a college education and degree to help them graduate with little or no debt via their scholarships. If universities start paying student-athletes, the universities would not be focused on what the student-athletes are attending for, which is the education and degree they receive. An education in the long-run is very valuable, and with the scholarships the student-athletes get, they can take advantage of a great education at little to no cost.

Universities offer students more than just the education and degree they receive. Lectures by prominent industry figures, concerts, movies, fitness facilities, student clubs are a few additional benefits that universities generally subsidize through fees added to tuition bills. This means that the full-scholarship athletes can attend these activities all for free. Universities also offer unique benefits to the student-athletes such as team-only workout facilities, top coaches, nutrition personnel, shiny gyms, lush fields, medical care, travel to away games, customized meal plans, free gear, and athletic attire. The university also offers the student-athletes the opportunity to play competitive games in large stadiums packed with committed fans, which allows student-athletes to garner media attention, and name recognition.

Athletes are aware of what they are committing to when they sign their full-scholarship forms. The school will be in charge of paying the student-athletes' expenses, and the student-athlete has the opportunity to earn an education, take part in academic and social activities in college, and play their sport in a high-profile manner. The best schools in certain sports naturally will attract the best recruits, as evidenced by the fact that the championships in the major sports are usually won by the same small group of schools that have dominated the sport. If paying players becomes normal, the universities that have made money from their winning teams would have an even greater advantage in attracting recruits. These universities would be able to pay players more money, thus getting the best players.

Title IX needs to be considered in the discussion regarding paying college athletes. Title IX prohibits excluding female athletes from education and financial benefit. If a university decides to pay the football team, other teams will need to be paid as well. Further, paying college football players will result in universities entering heated bidding wars while they are attracting recruits.

Mark Emmert, NCAA president is opposed to paying college athletes because it would encourage universities to bribe athletes. Emmert believes that if student-athletes were paid to play, there would be more pressure on boosters and agents to bribe student-athletes to play for a certain university and to financially support them while they are playing at the university. Emmert stands by the ideals that student-athletes are students first, and he backs up this ideal by noting student-athletes' graduation rate across all demographics is greater than the nonathletes. Emmert also stands behind the ideal that the money student-athletes receive through their scholarships is equal or greater than payments the proponents of pay-for-play advocate for.

=== Licensing of likenesses ===
Due to the NCAA restrictions on compensation, college athletes cannot personally license their likenesses to third-parties for commercial gains. In 2010, A. J. Green was suspended for four games by the NCAA for having sold a game-worn jersey from a bowl game to a former college player, whom the NCAA defined as an agent involved in marketing student-athletes. At the same time, however, the University of Georgia sold replica jerseys bearing Green's number for its own financial gain, and did not compensate him. A journal published by the University of La Verne Law Review argued that the NCAA was exploiting college athletes by not allowing them to receive compensation beyond scholarships for their participation in collegiate sports, and allowing schools to profit from merchandise associated with players, but not the players themselves. Furthermore, it was noted that television outlets pay conferences large sums of money for the rights to broadcast the events, which prominently feature the likenesses of players, yet the revenue from these rights fees cannot go to players.

The NCAA had also been accused of suppressing financial compensation to players for future uses of likenesses after they graduate. In 2009, retired basketball player Ed O'Bannon sued the NCAA, the Collegiate Licensing Company, and Electronic Arts on behalf of Division I basketball and football players. Among other examples, such as a lack of residuals for the broadcast of encores of games that featured him, O'Bannon cited that an EA Sports NCAA March Madness video game had featured a portrayal of himself as a member of UCLA's 1995 championship team. As with all other players in EA's college sports games, the game did not refer to O'Bannon by name, but the portrayal matched his jersey number, physical appearance, and style of play. The NCAA objected to the notions presented in the suit, arguing that paying athletes conflicted with its policies of amateurism in sport.

EA and the CLC agreed to a $40 million settlement. After the NCAA and other conferences withdrew their brand licenses with EA in response to the uncertainties, the company subsequently ceased the production of future college sports video games. A judge ruled that the NCAA's policies on noncompensation of athletes were a violation of antitrust law, and argued that universities should be able to cover the costs of athletes attending, and provide a trust fund of at least $5,000 per-season to athletes. It was argued that the NCAA "[did] not provide credible evidence that demand for [its] product would decrease if student-athletes were permitted, under certain circumstances, to receive a limited share of the revenue generated from the use of their own names, images, and likenesses."

On June 30, 2021, The NCAA finally agreed to the new NIL agreement that says that student athletes may use their name, image, and likeness to get paid. This is different than getting paid by the University. This is simply getting revenue strictly using your name, image, and likeness. This process is something student athletes themselves have to go out and do. Members of the NCAA got together and voted to make sure any athlete under the NCAA can profit using their name, image, and likeness.

The new NIL agreement allows student athletes to engage in the NIL, but they must follows the laws of that state that their University and/or college is located. Some of the guidelines NCAA provides that Michelle Hosick in 2021 wrote are, "College athletes who attend a school in a state without an NIL law can engage in this type of activity without violating NCAA rules related to name, image and likeness. Individuals can use a professional services provider for NIL activities. Student-athletes should report NIL activities consistent with state law or school and conference requirements to their school" (Hosick 2021).

The policy of the new NIL agreement is the same for all three divisions within the NCAA. Many people were often confused about this agreement where they thought players were being paid to play, which in this situation is not the case. "The new policy preserves the fact college sports are not pay-for-play," said Division II presidents Council chair Sandra Jordan, chancellor at the University of South Carolina Aiken. "It also reinforces key principles of fairness and integrity across the NCAA and maintains rules prohibiting improper recruiting inducements. It's important any new rules maintain these principles" (Hosick 2021).

Hosick, M. (2021, June 30). NCAA adopts interim name, image and likeness policy. NCAA.org – the official site of the NCAA. Retrieved November 5, 2021, from https://www.ncaa.org/about/resources/media-center/news/ncaa-adopts-interim-name-image-and-likeness-policy.

==== Coach's Pay ====
The NCAA allows for the coaches to be both paid and allow them to reach outside the NCAA to find endorsements and sponsorships from outside sources. Endorsements with apparel and shoe companies, and even book deals. The endorsement and sponsorship money was added with the coach's pay, which could reach up to $9 million dollars. Over 150 basketball and football coaches had a salary that broke $1 million dollars and over 35 coaches had salaries that broke $4 million dollars. There have been times where NCAA coaches' are paid more than their professional counterparts. Coaches don't have to follow the rules that student-athletes do. They are allowed to choose which school they coach for, even after leaving another school. They can choose to coach for one team their entire career or they could leave and coach the school that offers them the highest salary. Student-Athletes, unlike their coaches, are prohibited from freely moving between teams.

== See also ==
- 2010–2014 NCAA conference realignment
- 2021–2026 NCAA conference realignment
- College rivalries
- List of college athletic conferences
- List of college athletic programs by U.S. state
- List of college athletics championship game outcomes
- List of college mascots in U.S.
- List of NCAA Division I athletic directors
- National Association of Collegiate Directors of Athletics (NACDA)
- National Intercollegiate Rodeo Association (NIRA)
- Recruiting
- United States Collegiate Athletic Association (USCCA)
- United States Intercollegiate Boxing Association (USIBA)
