= Grapple on the Gridiron =

Oklahoma State Cowboys	Iowa Hawkeyes
(0–0)	(0–0)
16	18
Head coach: John Smith	Head coach: Tom Brands
Coaches 1	Coaches 4
	1	Total
Oklahoma State	16	16
Iowa	18	18
- Date: November 14, 2015
- Season: 2015
- Stadium: Kinnick Stadium
- Location: Iowa City, Iowa
- Attendance: 42,287

United States TV coverage
- Network: BTN

The Grapple on the Gridiron was a college wrestling dual meet held on November 14, 2015, in Iowa City, Iowa. Historical rivals Oklahoma State University and University of Iowa. A record 42,287 fans attended the meet, held outdoors at the Kinnick Stadium, normally the home of Iowa's football program. The meet marked the first time two college teams wrestled in a football stadium and the first time an NCAA Division I football stadium had hosted wrestling match.

== See also ==
- Crossover at Kinnick, a 2023 women's basketball exhibition game at the same stadium
