= Crossover at Kinnick =

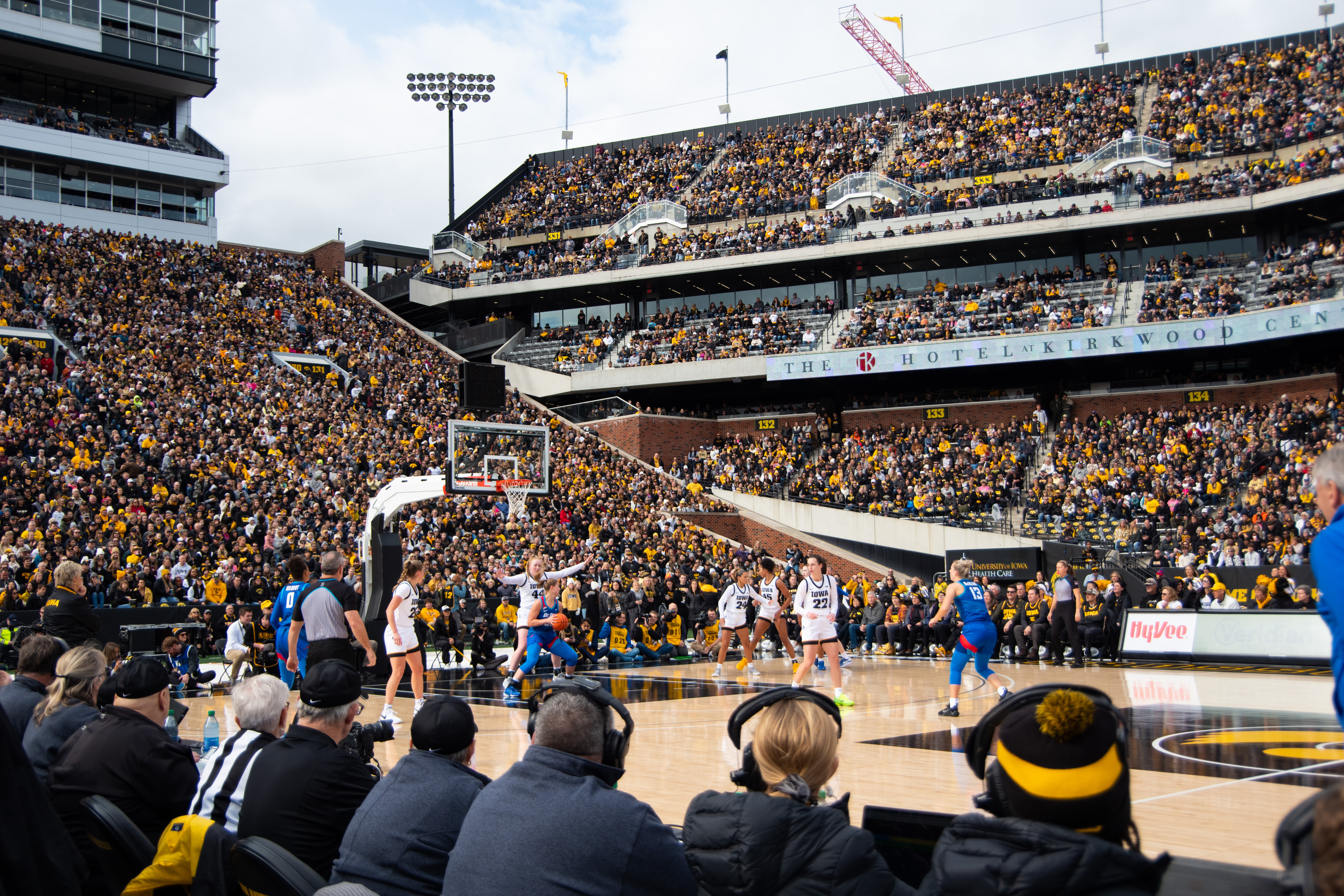
- A view from behind the scorers table during the 2023 game
DePaul Blue Demons	Iowa Hawkeyes
72	94
Head coach: Doug Bruno	Head coach: Lisa Bluder
	1	2	3	4	Total
DePaul Blue Demons	18	19	14	21	72
Iowa Hawkeyes	24	28	25	17	94
- Date: October 15, 2023
- Venue: Kinnick Stadium, Iowa City, Iowa United States
- MVP: Caitlin Clark
- Referees: Michael McConnell; Maggie Tieman; Nykesha Thompson
- Attendance: 55,646
- National anthem: Hawkeye Marching Band
- Halftime show: Hawkeye Marching Band

United States TV coverage
- Network: Big Ten Network
- Announcers: Mike Hall (play-by-play); Christy Winters-Scott (color analyst); Meghan McKeown (color analyst)

Crossover at Kinnick was an American exhibition women's college basketball game between the Iowa Hawkeyes and the DePaul Blue Demons. Held at Kinnick Stadium, the home stadium of the Hawkeyes football team, the game set the women's basketball single-game attendance record (55,646). Led by reigning national player of the year Caitlin Clark, who had a 34-point triple-double, Iowa defeated DePaul, 94–72.

== Background ==
In the 2022–23 season, Iowa reached the 2023 NCAA Division I women's basketball championship game, losing to LSU. The success of guard Caitlin Clark, who earned all major national player of the year awards, drove record ticket sales for the 2023–24 team. DePaul finished with a 16–17 record and missed the NCAA tournament, before losing star forward Aneesah Morrow to the transfer portal.

On August 10, 2023, Iowa announced that it would host DePaul in a preseason exhibition game at Kinnick Stadium, the school's football stadium, with proceeds going to the University of Iowa Children's Hospital. In case of inclement weather, the game would be moved to Carver–Hawkeye Arena. Head coaches Lisa Bluder of Iowa and Doug Bruno of DePaul first discussed the idea for the game during a private preseason scrimmage between their teams in the previous year. Bluder proposed the idea to Iowa interim athletic director Beth Goetz shortly after the 2023 NCAA tournament, inspired by the success of the campus celebration of the 2022–23 team, which drew 9,000 fans, and the school's Grapple on the Gridiron wrestling meet in 2015.

== Game summary ==
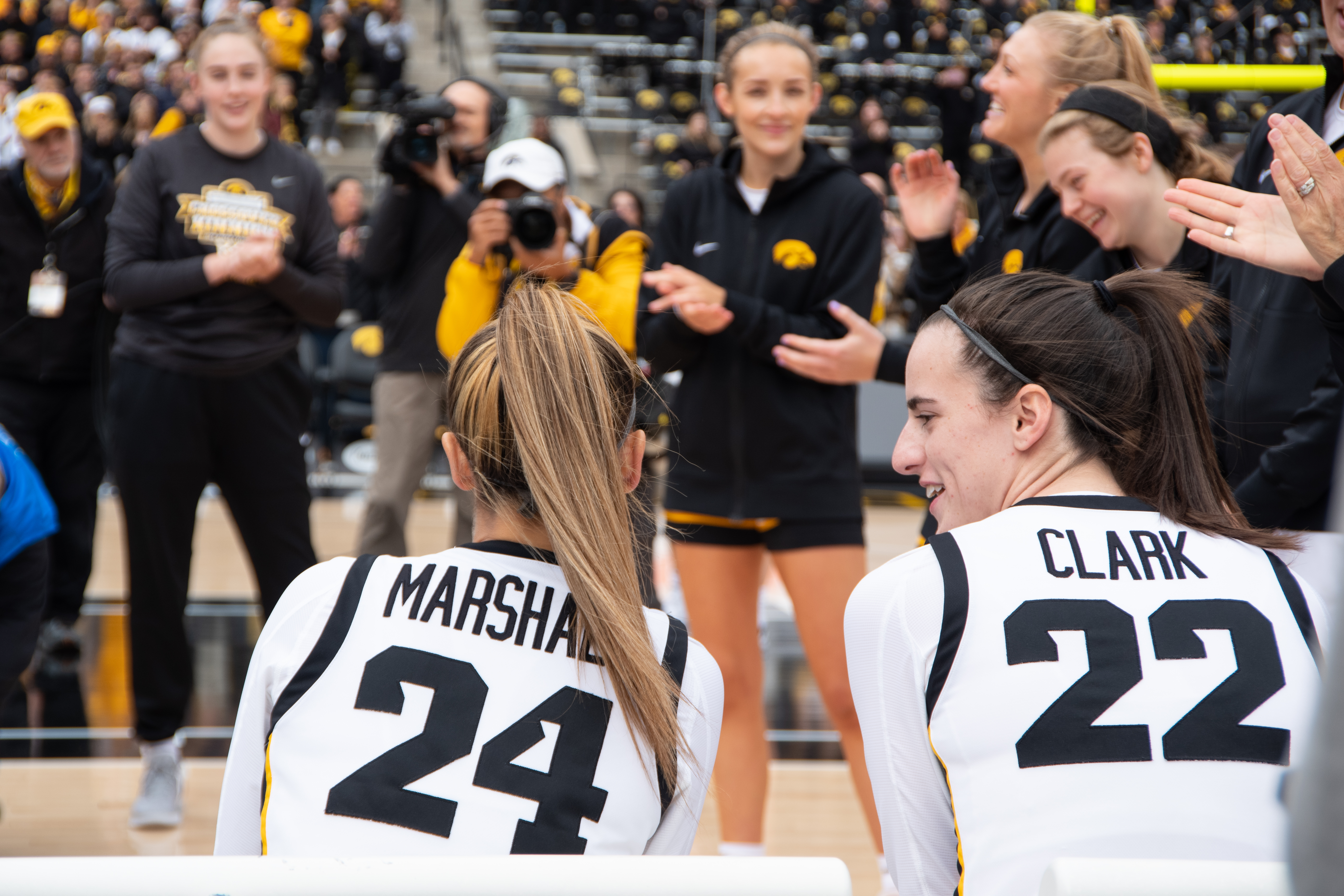
Caitlin Clark and Gabbie Marshall on the sidelines at Crossover at Kinnick in 2023

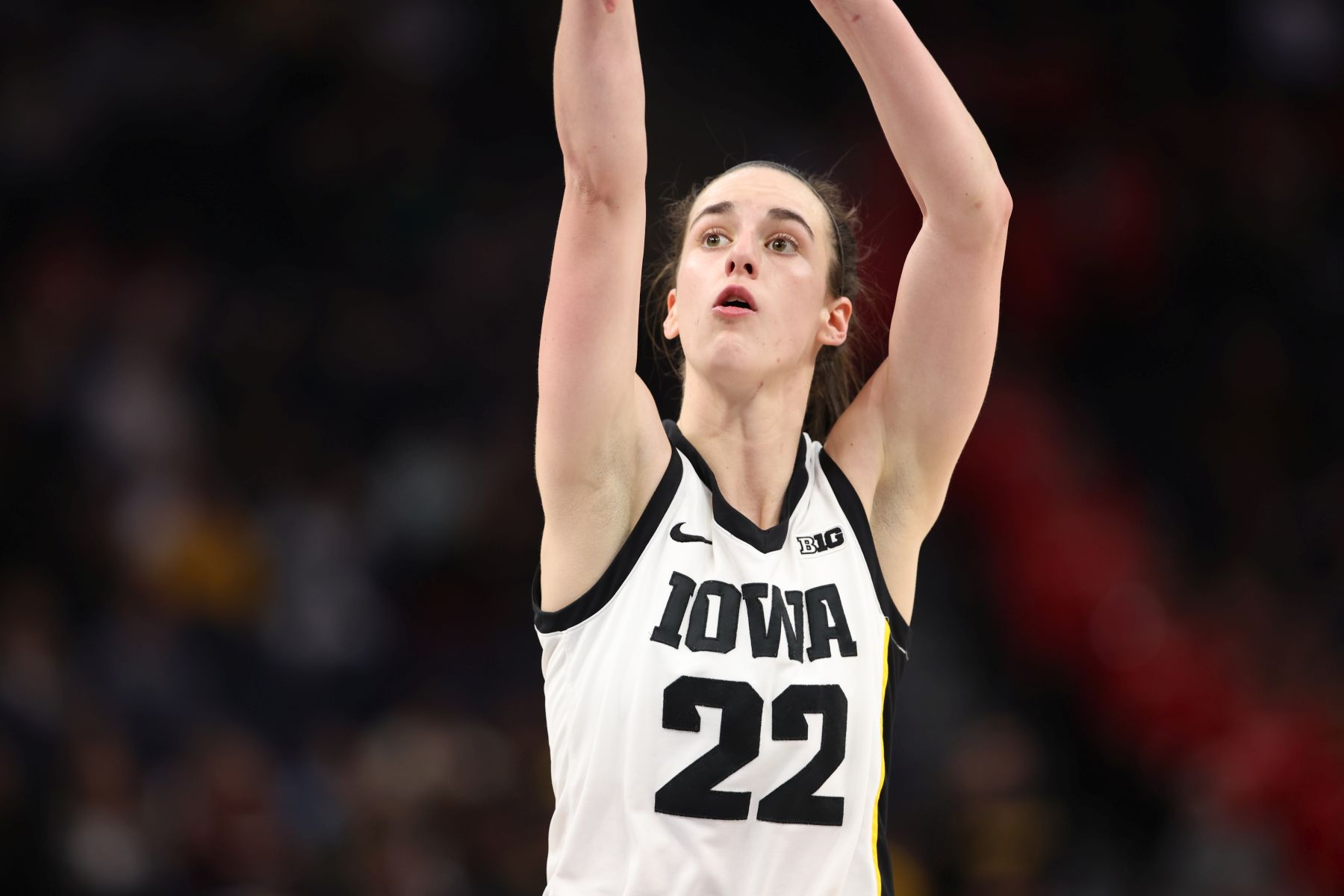
Caitlin Clark led Iowa to a win with a 34-point triple-double.

Crossover at Kinnick had an attendance of 55,646, the highest for a single game in women's basketball history. The previous record was 29,619, in the national championship of the 2002 NCAA tournament between UConn and Oklahoma at the Alamodome in San Antonio, Texas. It was the first women's basketball game to be played in an outdoor football stadium. The game was televised on the Big Ten Network, with Mike Hall on play-by-play commentary and Christy Winters-Scott and Meghan McKeown as color analysts.

After DePaul led by three early in the first quarter, Iowa rallied and held the lead for the rest of the game. The Hawkeyes started the second quarter on a 10–3 run to extend their lead to double digits. At halftime, Iowa led 52–37, behind 24 points, seven assists and five rebounds from Caitlin Clark. They finished the third quarter with a 77–51 lead and won the game, 94–72, despite a 15–0 run from DePaul to start the fourth quarter. Clark posted a triple-double of 34 points, 11 rebounds and 10 assists, while Anaya Peoples led DePaul with 19 points and five rebounds.

== Aftermath ==
The game raised about $250,000 for the University of Iowa Children's Hospital. It drew attention to the growing popularity of women's sports, with analysts comparing it to Volleyball Day in Nebraska, an August 2023 outdoor volleyball game hosted by Nebraska, which was the highest-attended women's sporting event of all time.
