= Volleyball Day in Nebraska =

2023 volleyball event in Lincoln, Nebraska

Omaha Mavericks (Summit League) (0–2)	Nebraska Cornhuskers (Big Ten) (3–0)
0	3
	1	2	3	Total
Omaha	14	14	13	41
No. 4 Nebraska	25	25	25	75
- Date: August 30, 2023
- Stadium: Memorial Stadium; Lincoln, Nebraska
- Referee: Suzanne Lowry
- Attendance: 92,003

Ceremonies
- National anthem: Hannah Huston
- Halftime show: Cornhusker Marching Band

TV in the United States
- Network: Big Ten Network (Note: The match between Nebraska at Kearney, Wayne State was broadcast on Nebraska Public Media.)
- Announcers: Connor Onion (play-by-play); Emily Ehman (analyst); Larry Punteney (sideline)

Radio in the United States
- Network: Huskers Radio Network
- Announcers: John Baylor (play-by-play); Lauren West (analyst)

Volleyball Day in Nebraska was a two-game college volleyball event hosted by the University of Nebraska–Lincoln at Memorial Stadium on August 30, 2023. It featured three schools from the University of Nebraska system and one from the Nebraska State College System. The event's recorded attendance of 92,003 was the second-largest attendance ever recorded at a women's sporting event, exceeded only by the 1971 Women's World Cup final in Mexico City. (Note: The match between Nebraska and Omaha set an American record for the highest recorded attendance at a women's sporting event. The only greater attendance in the world was for the 1971 Women's World Cup final between Denmark and Mexico at the Estadio Azteca, estimated at 110,000. This figure was reported both at the time and subsequently, and surviving footage supports the figure.)

== Background ==
Volleyball has been a popular spectator sport in the state of Nebraska for decades – the Cornhuskers played at the NU Coliseum for their first thirty-eight season of varsity competition, but demand for tickets consistently outpaced the venue's approximately 4,000-seat capacity. The program moved to the larger Bob Devaney Sports Center in 2013 and led the country in attendance for each of the next ten seasons.

Nebraska has participated in most of the highest-attended volleyball games ever played, but the regular-season record was broken by Florida and Wisconsin at the Kohl Center on September 16, 2022. Hoping to take the record back, Nebraska coach John Cook considered hosting a match at Lincoln's West Haymarket Arena or Omaha's CHI Health Center, but they were deemed either too small or impractical. Cook and athletic director Trev Alberts began planning a match at the 85,458-seat Memorial Stadium, home to Nebraska's football program since 1923.

Preparation was similar to a football Saturday, involving more than 3,300 staff members and thirty-five agencies and departments from the university and city of Lincoln. Though the event was not initially expected to draw as many fans as a football game, Nebraska canceled classes on August 30 to avoid competing traffic between students and fans (Volleyball Day was held on a Wednesday). Free transportation was provided on gameday to reduce traffic near the stadium.

The university spent over one million dollars to construct and tear down the elevated court, which was set up on the north side of the field and oriented north-to-south. Tickets were initially made available in only the north stadium and parts of east and west stadiums – these sold out quickly and tickets were made available throughout the entire stadium. General admission tickets were priced at $25, but in some cases sold for over $400 on the secondary market.

== Match summaries ==
=== Kearney vs. Wayne State ===
Division II opponents Nebraska–Kearney and Wayne State met in an exhibition prior to Nebraska's game against Omaha. The game began in the middle of an 86 °F (30 °C) afternoon, forcing several players to wear sunglasses during pre-match warmups. Fourth-ranked Wayne State swept the Lopers 25–17, 25–17, 15–12 (the third set was played despite the Wildcats securing the abbreviated match after two sets).

Nebraska paid $50,000 each to Kearney and Wayne State to cover travel expenses.

=== Omaha vs. Nebraska ===
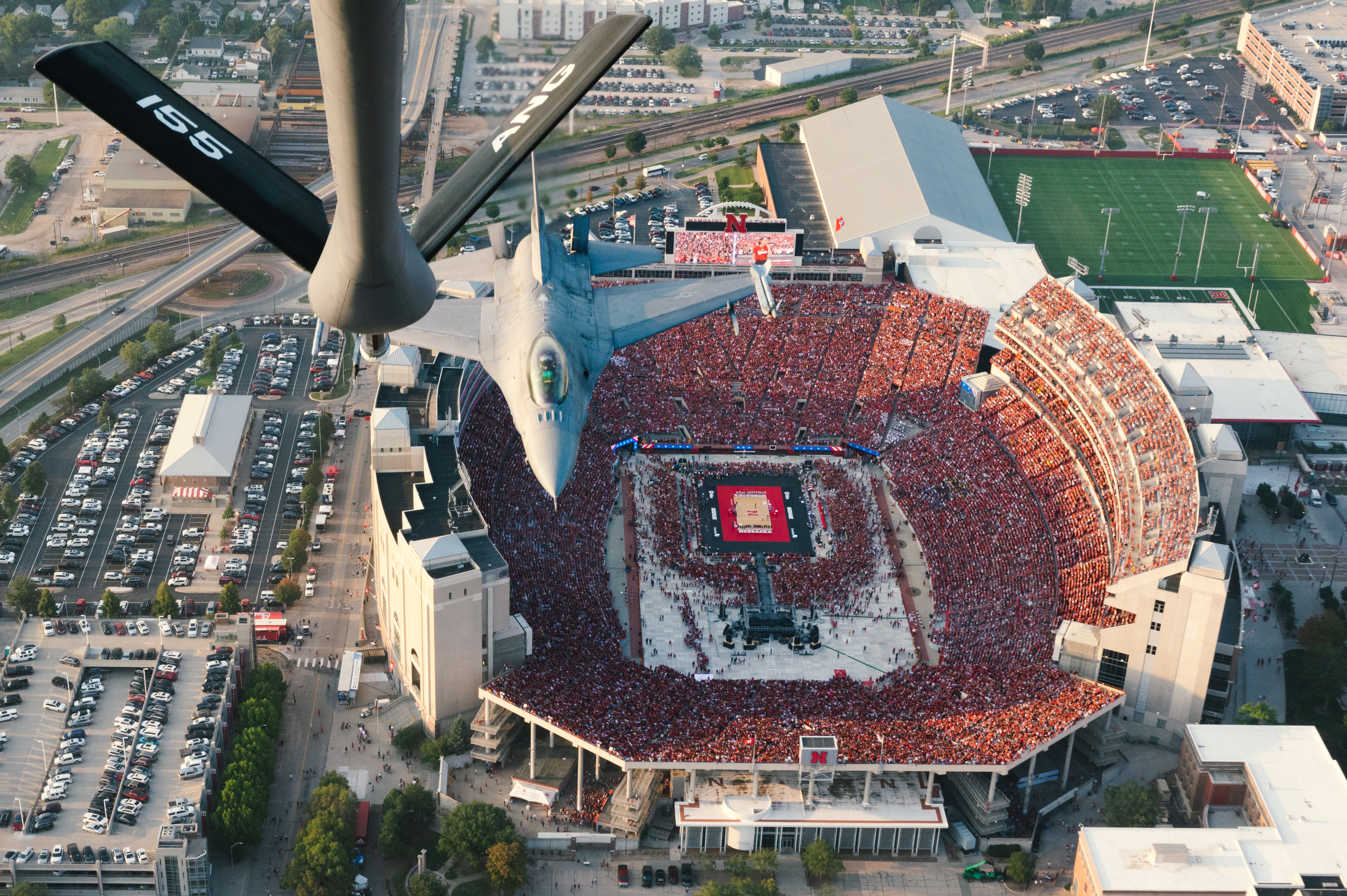
A KC-135 Stratotanker of the Nebraska Air National Guard and a F-16 Fighting Falcon of the South Dakota Air National Guard conduct a pregame flyover.

The main event between Nebraska and Omaha, scheduled for a 7:00 p.m. local start, was attended by NCAA president Charlie Baker, state governor Jim Pillen, three-time Olympic gold medalist Kerri Walsh Jennings, and many current and former Nebraska athletes. Led by Cook and team captains Merritt Beason and Lexi Rodriguez, Nebraska took the field from the southwest corner of Memorial Stadium to the Alan Parsons Project instrumental "Sirius," just as Nebraska's football program had done since the early 1990s.

The first set was tied at four until a six-point Nebraska run opened a 10–4 lead. NU led 15–8 to force an Omaha timeout, and the Cornhuskers soon put the set away and won 25–14. The second set began similarly, with Nebraska leading 10–4 and Omaha using both of its timeouts. Middle blocker Andi Jackson's seven kills eased the Cornhuskers into a 2–0 lead. After the intermission, Nebraska took a 12–6 lead in the third set and never allowed Omaha to get within four points before finishing the sweep.

Following the match, Nebraska players returned to the court for a drone light show and Cook gave an emotional speech thanking the crowd and university for its support. Country music star Scotty McCreery performed, noting it was the largest crowd he had ever played to. McCreery's Memorial Stadium performance was featured in the music video for his single "Cab in a Solo."

Match statistics
Statistic	Omaha	Nebraska
Kills	18	29
Attack pct.	-.080	.263
Aces	1	7
Assists	18	25
Blocks	4.5	7.0
Digs	37	33

Match leaders
Statistic	Omaha		Nebraska	
Kills	Two players tied	5	Andi Jackson	8
Attacks	Shayla McCormick	23	Merritt Beason	20
Aces	Shayla McCormick	1	Lexi Rodriguez	3
Assists	Olivia Curry	10	Bergen Reilly	18
Blocks	Emily Huss	1.5	Merritt Beason	2.0
Digs	Erica Fava	10	Lexi Rodriguez	15

== Attendance ==
In between the second and third sets, the official attendance of 92,003 was announced to the crowd, setting an American record for a women's sporting event. Nebraska had sold out every football game at Memorial Stadium since 1962, but additional field-level and standing-room-only tickets allowed the Volleyball Day event to set a venue attendance record, surpassing the 91,585 that saw NU play Miami (FL) in 2014. Nebraska's volleyball program maintained its own lengthy sellout streak (306 consecutive games at the time), though the Memorial Stadium game did not count toward the streak as it is not a primary home venue.

== Aftermath ==
The game was televised nationally on the Big Ten Network, averaging 518,000 viewers to become the second-most-watched regular-season volleyball broadcast ever. Several high-profile sports figures, including Magic Johnson, Terence Crawford, and Danny Kanell made social media posts sending congratulations and expressing enthusiasm. The entire team, especially Cook and Rodriguez, Nebraska's biggest star, were lauded for creating a "must-see event" for young girls pursuing athletics.

Oklahoma softball head coach Patty Gasso suggested OU could host a similar event at Owen Field, and LSU women's basketball player Angel Reese stated interest in playing a game at Tiger Stadium. Months after Volleyball Day, the University of Iowa hosted the "Crossover at Kinnick" at Kinnick Stadium, setting a women's basketball attendance record at 55,646.

Thanks largely to the Memorial Stadium event, Nebraska's volleyball program generated $7.3 million in revenue with a $1.3 million surplus in the 2023–24 fiscal year, both program records, and its ticket revenue for the year vastly outpaced any other women's program at any university. Nebraska finished the season 33–2, losing the national championship match to Texas.
