= University of Iowa Children's Hospital =

Pediatric hospital in Iowa City, Iowa, U.S.

Coordinates: 41.658413°N 91.549252°W

University of Iowa Stead Family Children's Hospital

Geography
- Location: 200 Hawkins Drive, Iowa City, Iowa, United States

Organization
- Care system: Medicare/Medicaid/Private
- Type: Teaching
- Affiliated university: University of Iowa

Services
- Emergency department: Level I Pediatric Trauma Center
- Beds: 190

History
- Founded: 1919

Links
- Website: http://www.uichildrens.org/
- Lists: Hospitals in the United States

University of Iowa Stead Family Children's Hospital, formerly University of Iowa Children's Hospital and Children's Hospital of Iowa, is a pediatric acute care academic children's hospital located in Iowa City, Iowa, United States. The hospital was founded in 1919 and its current facility, opened in 2017, overlooks the university's football home, Kinnick Stadium. The hospital has 190 inpatient pediatric beds and is affiliated with the University of Iowa Carver College of Medicine. The hospital provides comprehensive pediatric specialties and subspecialties to pediatric patients aged 0–21 throughout Iowa and is one of the only children's hospitals in the region and state. University of Iowa Stead Family Children's Hospital also features the only ACS verified Level 1 Pediatric Trauma Center in the state.

== History ==
The hospital was originally founded in 1919.

=== Firsts ===
The University of Iowa Hospitals and Clinics is also where Dr. Ignacio Ponseti developed the Ponseti method. The Ponseti method is a revolutionary non-surgical way to treat congenital clubfoot, which had previously been treated through surgeries to infants or children at a young age. The Ponseti method is a way to treat clubfoot through a series of manipulating bones and tendons in the foot and holding them in place through a series of casts. It is a treatment technique that is still used worldwide to this day.

=== New facilities ===
In the fall of 2012, a project began to create a new University of Iowa Children's Hospital. The hospital is located to the west of the original at the site of a former parking structure for University Hospital, overlooking Kinnick Stadium, and is also connected to the hospital and new parking structure. The target completion date for the project was initially set for March 2016, but delays meant that the new facility did not receive its first patients until February 2017; seven of the 14 floors opened at that time while construction on other floors was nearing completion.

The project was estimated to cost approximately $292 million – none of which was funded by tax dollars, however, it ended up being closer to $360 million. The funding was achieved through bonds, patient revenue, and private gifts.

The building is 480,000 square feet of new construction as well as 56,250 square feet of renovated existing space. It contains 14 floors (12 above ground, two below ground). Those 14 floors include a total of 134 beds for patients, those being for Pediatric care, Neonatal, Medical/Surgical Units, Operating Rooms, Infusion/Dialysis Center and finally the Pediatric Cancer Center. The two lower-level floors are where Radiology and Procedure Suites are located.

=== Recognition ===
In the 2025-2026 U.S. News & World Report rankings, the hospital was ranked as the top children's hospital in Iowa and #12 in the Midwest. The hospital was recognized as one of the top 50 hospitals in six different specialty areas as well.

=== The Wave ===
At the end of the first quarter of every home Iowa Football game, fans, coaches, and players across the street at Kinnick Stadium pause before the next quarter and wave to the pediatric patients at the hospital. Beginning in 2017, the tradition is now referred to as, "The Wave".

== Divisions ==
The following medical divisions are available: General Pediatrics, Family Medicine, Adolescent Medicine, Allergy/Pulmonary diseases, Anesthesia, Blood and Marrow Transplantation, Burn Treatment, Cardiology, Child Abuse and Neglect, Child Health Specialty Clinics, Child Neurology, Child Psychology, Child Psychiatry, Clinical Pharmacology, Continuity of Care, Critical Care, Dentistry, Dermatology, Developmental Disabilities, ECMO, Emergency Care, Endocrinology, Gastroenterology, Genetics, Hematology, Infectious Diseases, Mother's Milk Bank of Iowa, Neonatology, Nephrology, Neurosurgery, Nuclear Medicine, Nutrition, Obstetrics/Gynecology, Oncology, Ophthalmology, Oral and Maxillofacial Surgery, Orthodontics, Orthopaedic Surgery, Spinal Deformity, Otolaryngology-Head and Neck Surgery, Speech, Swallowing, Voice, Pediatric Outreach Clinics (Cardiac-Electrophysiology, Cardiology, Cystic Fibrosis, Diabetes/Endocrinology, Endocrinology, Gastroenterology, Hemoglobinopathy, Neurology, Neuromuscular), Radiation Oncology, Radiology, Rheumatology, Special Education, Specialized Child Health Services, Surgery (Pediatric), Thoracic and Cardiovascular Surgery, Toxicology, Transplantation Surgery, Trauma Surgery, and Urology.

University of Iowa Hospitals and Clinics is in partnership with University of Iowa Roy J. and Lucille A. Carver College of Medicine and University of Iowa Children's Hospital which completes the state University of Iowa Health Care.

== See also ==
- List of Children's Hospitals in the United States
