= Kinnick Stadium =

Home stadium of the Iowa Hawkeyes. Iowa City, Iowa

- Duke Slater Field
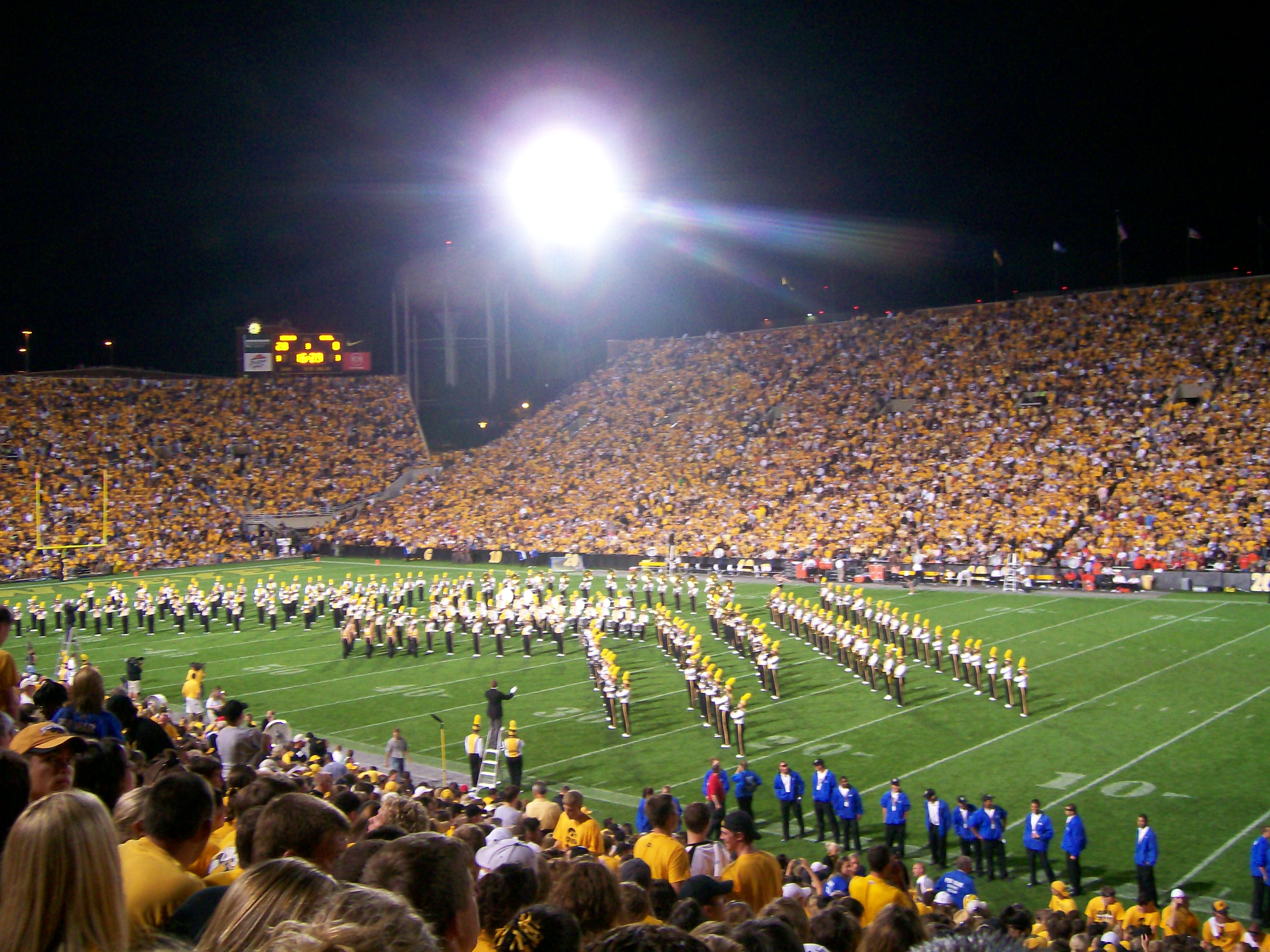
- The stadium during a football game between Iowa and Syracuse in September 2007

- Location within Iowa Location within the United States
- Former names: Iowa Stadium (1929–1972)
- Address: 886 Evashevski Drive
- Location: Iowa City, Iowa
- Coordinates: 41°39′31″N 91°33′4″W
- Operator: The University of Iowa
- Capacity: 69,250 (2018-present) Former capacity List: 70,585 (2006–2017); 70,397 (1992–2005); 70,220 (1990–1991); 67,700 (1983–1989); 60,160 (1956–1982); 53,000 (1929–1955)
- Surface: FieldTurf (2009–present); AstroTurf (1972–1988); Grass (1929–1971, 1989–2008)

Construction
- Groundbreaking: March 6, 1929
- Opened: October 5, 1929
- Renovated: 2006, 2017-2019
- Expanded: 1956, 1983, 1990
- Cost: $497,151.42 (initial construction) ($9.32 million in 2025 dollars)
- Architects: Proudfoot, Rawson, and Souers; HNTB (renovation)

Tenants
- Iowa Hawkeyes football (NCAA) (1929–present)

Website
- hawkeyesports.com/kinnick-stadium

Kinnick Stadium is a stadium located in Iowa City, Iowa, United States. It is the home stadium of the University of Iowa Hawkeyes football team. Opened in 1929 as Iowa Stadium to replace Iowa Field, it currently holds up to 69,250 people, making it the 7th largest stadium in the Big Ten, and one of the 20 largest university owned stadiums in the nation. Primarily used for college football, the stadium is named for Nile Kinnick, the Iowa player who won the 1939 Heisman Trophy and died in service during World War II. Kinnick Stadium is the only college football stadium named after a Heisman Trophy winner.

== History ==
=== Construction ===
Originally named Iowa Stadium, the facility was constructed in only seven months between 1928 and 1929. Groundbreaking and construction began on March 6, 1929. Workers worked around the clock using lights by night and horses and mules as the primary heavy-equipment movers. There was a rumor for many years that horses that died during the process were buried under what now is the North end zone. Historians report this is a myth and the animals were disposed of in the nearby Iowa River. The round-the-clock construction came to an end in July. Despite several problems to overcome, including the athletic director's resignation and a slight redesign, the stadium was completed and the first game was played October 5, 1929, against Monmouth College. Iowa won the game 46–0. The stadium was dedicated two weeks later, when the Hawkeyes tied Illinois 7–7.

=== Name ===
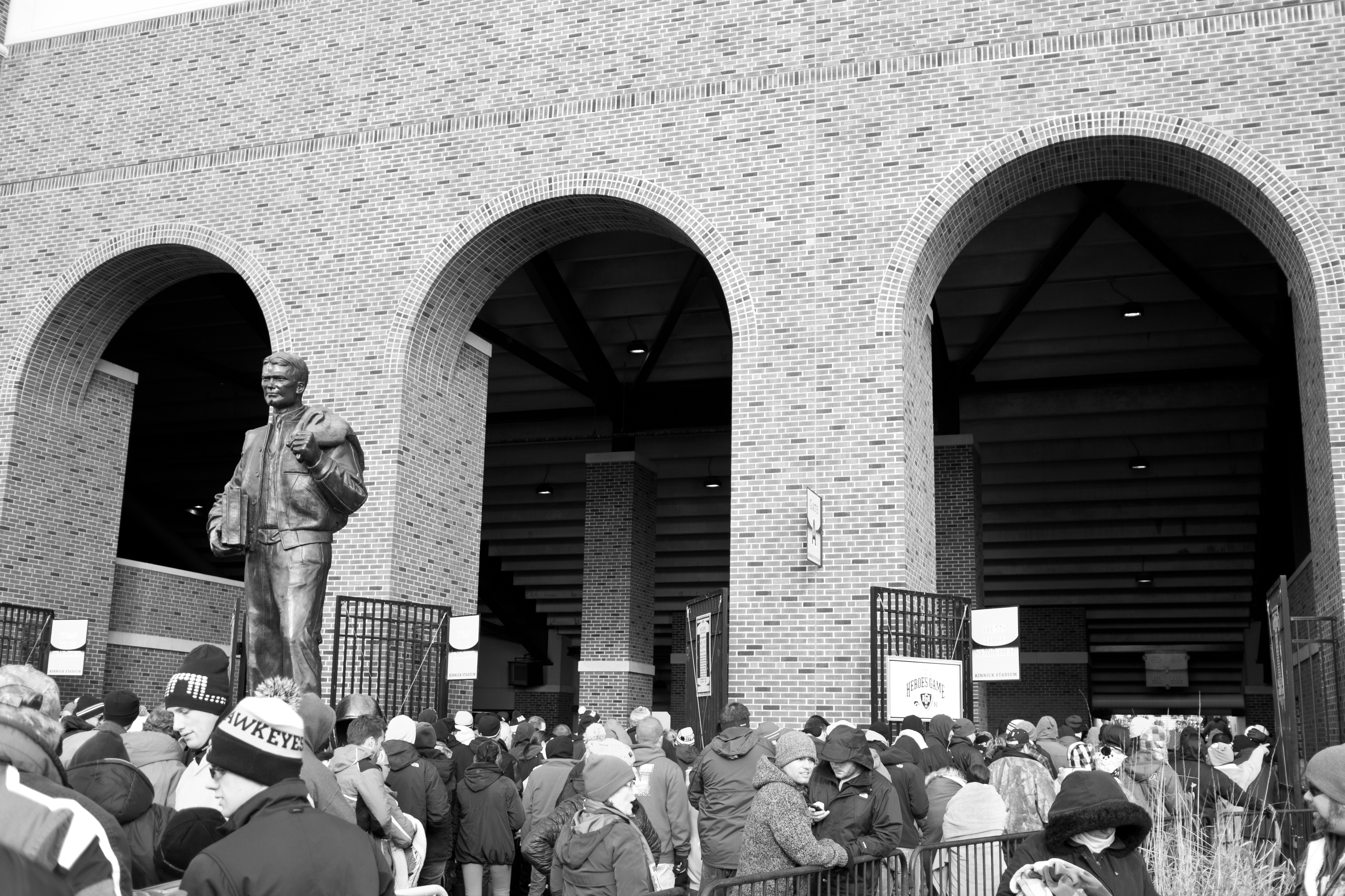
Statue of Nile Kinnick in front of the stadium bearing his name

Calls to rename Iowa Stadium in Nile Kinnick's honor came immediately after the Heisman trophy winner's death in 1943. In November 1945 the University of Iowa student body voted to rededicate the structure as "Nile Kinnick Memorial Stadium". The other options on the student ballot were "Memorial Stadium" and "Robert Jones Stadium", after the first University of Iowa student to be killed in World War II.

Upon announcement of the student vote the new name was taken up by The Daily Iowan student newspaper, World Almanac, and other sources. However, the student vote was unofficial and efforts to rename the stadium were never pursued by the university.

In 1972 "Nile Kinnick Stadium" was again proposed by Cedar Rapids Gazette sportswriter Gus Schrader, who had previously supported the students' efforts. This time the lobbying campaign was successful, and the stadium was officially renamed later that year. The initial response from University president Willard Boyd suggested the name "Kinnick-Slater Stadium" instead, to also honor Duke Slater, who played for the Hawkeyes from 1918 to 1921.

Slater was a two-time All-American at Iowa and an inaugural member of the College Football Hall of Fame, along with Kinnick; Slater was the first black All-American in Iowa history and the only black person in the inaugural Hall of Fame class. He was also the first black lineman to play in the NFL, where he was a seven time All-Pro player, before a later career as a lawyer and judge. Ultimately, the stadium was named for Kinnick alone, while Slater was honored with the name of a nearby dormitory.

In 2021, Iowa's Board of Regents renamed the football playing field for Slater, making it Duke Slater Field at Kinnick Stadium.

=== Renovation ===
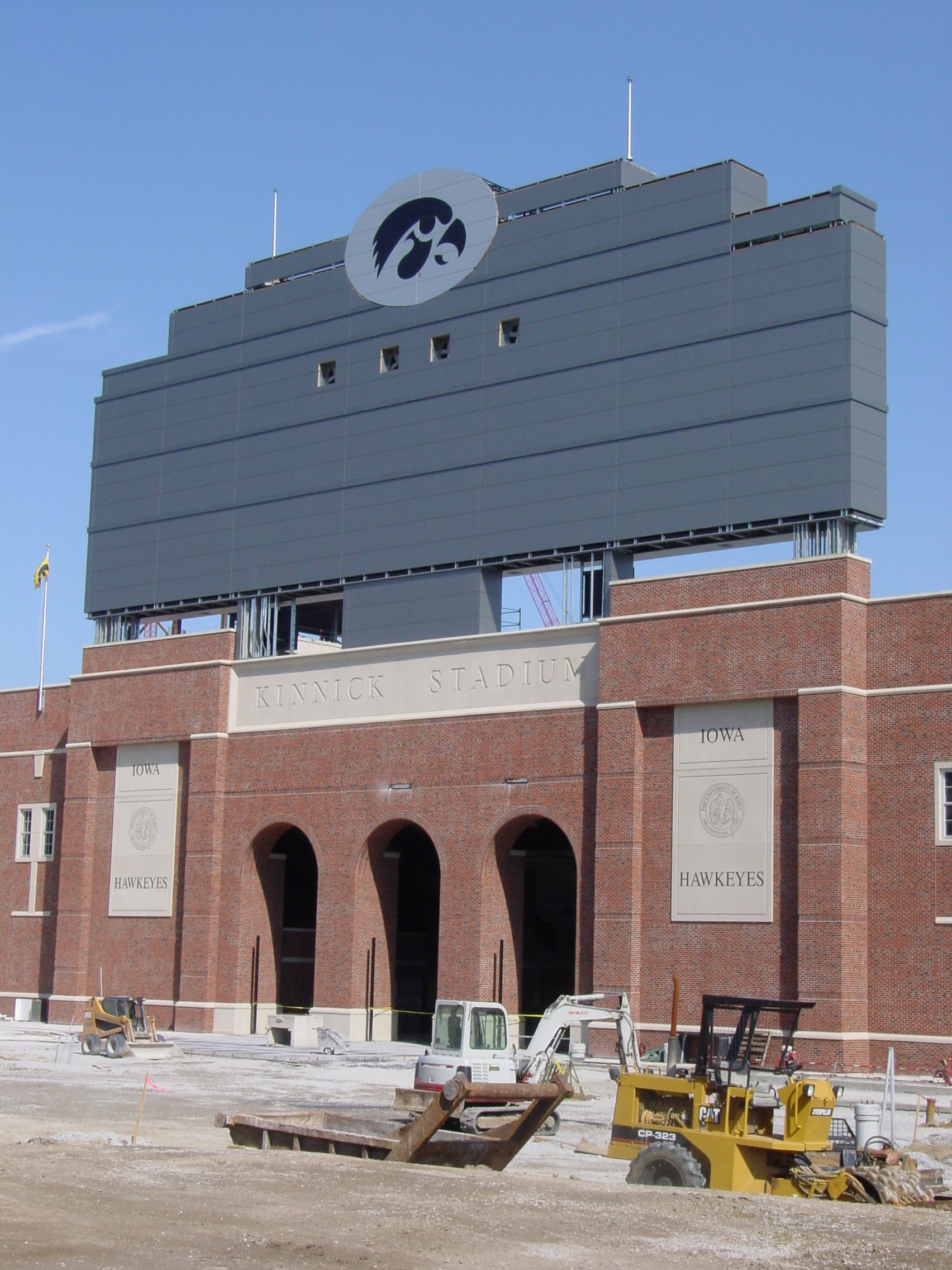
The scoreboard in the south end zone at Kinnick Stadium, as seen in 2005

After 75 years of operation, the Iowa Board of Regents endorsed a major renovation of Kinnick Stadium on March 10, 2004. The US$86.8 million project was to build a new state of the art press box, a new scoreboard with a new sound system, replace the "temporary" south endzone bleachers with permanent seating, triple the restroom facilities, and more than double the number of concession stands, as well as smaller changes such as new locker rooms, a bronze statue of Nile Kinnick and the dedication of the Krause Family Plaza to which Kinnick Stadium is now adjacent. Every brick for the renovation came from the Glen-Gery Brickyard in Redfield, which is located near Nile Kinnick's childhood home in Adel. The stadium was rededicated on September 1, 2006. Among other things, the rededication featured a flyover by a F4F Wildcat, the aircraft that Kinnick flew in World War II.

The stadium also underwent major renovations in 1956, 1983, and 1990 where capacity was gradually taken from 53,000 to 70,397. The 2004–06 renovations pushed the capacity to 70,585.

In the spring of 2009, the natural grass turf and 20-year-old drainage system were replaced with a new state-of-the-art synthetic FieldTurf playing surface.

In 2013, the Iowa Board of Regents approved an $8 million upgrade of Kinnick Stadium's video and sound systems. These upgrades include the installation of new HD video displays in both the north and south endzones, as well as a new HD ribbon display above the north endzone. The upgrades were completed by the start of the 2013 football season.

In 2016, the Iowa Board of Regents approved an $89.9 million upgrade to Kinnick Stadium's north end zone. The renovation included the addition of box seating, outdoor club seating and a scoreboard larger than the board in the south end zone. These renovations lowered the total capacity of the stadium to 69,250. The project was completed shortly before the beginning of the 2019 season.

In 2019, the tunnel connecting the home locker room to the field was upgraded, with the addition of black and gold signage, lighting, and logos.

=== Crossover at Kinnick ===
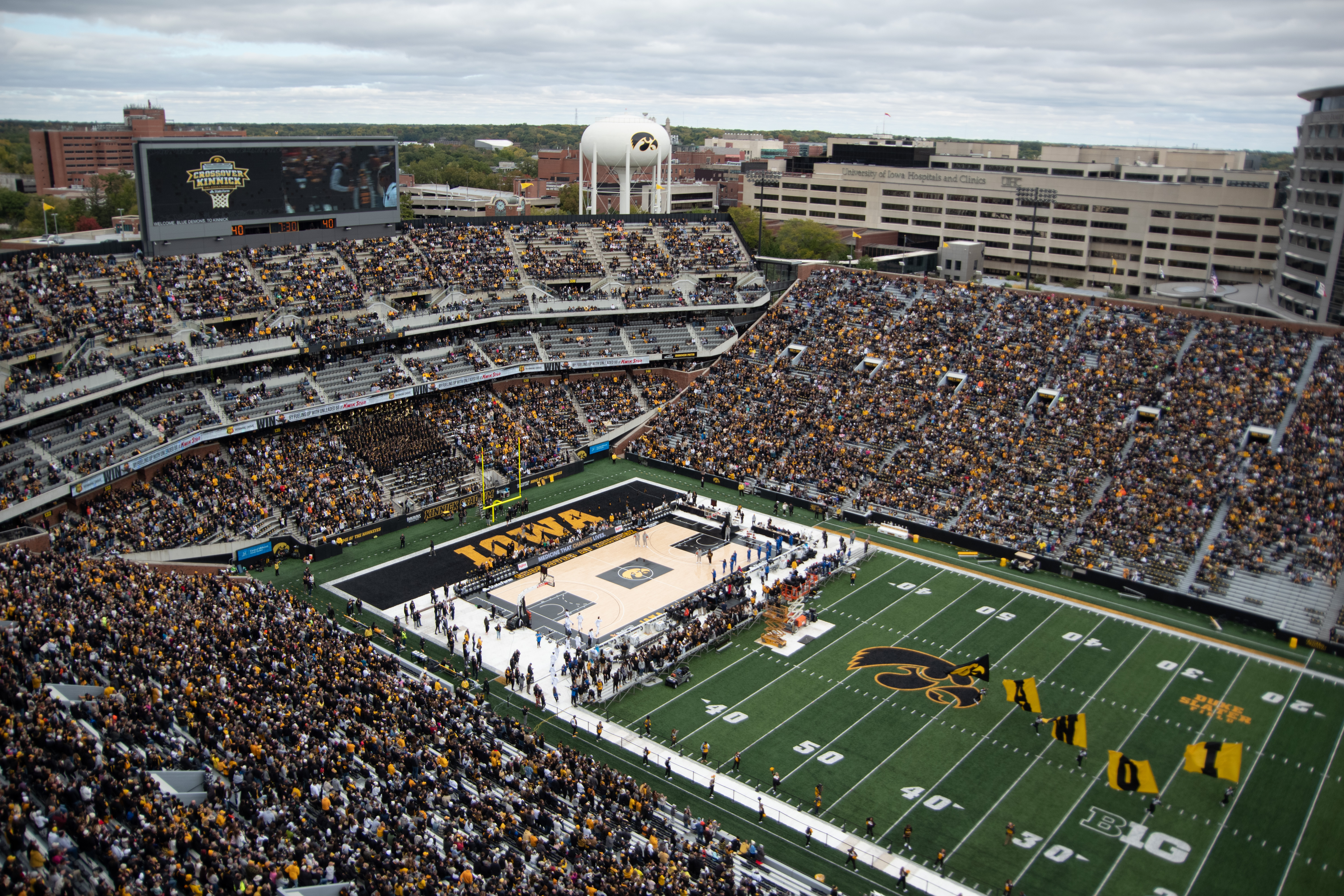
A view of the Crossover at Kinnick showing the configuration of the court within the football field

On October 15, 2023, the stadium hosted Crossover at Kinnick, an exhibition women's college basketball game between the Iowa Hawkeyes and the DePaul Blue Demons. The game had an attendance of 55,646, the highest for a single game in women's basketball history. The previous record was 29,619, in the national championship of the 2002 NCAA tournament between UConn and Oklahoma at the Alamodome in San Antonio, Texas. It was the first women's basketball game to be played in an outdoor football stadium.

== Features ==
The playing surface is currently the synthetic FieldTurf (installed in 2009), although it was AstroTurf from 1972 until grass was reinstalled for the 1989 season. The installation of artificial turf came at the same time that Iowa Stadium was renamed Kinnick Stadium in honor of the Heisman winner who had perished 29 years earlier.

When filled to capacity, Kinnick Stadium would be the sixth largest city in Iowa (after Des Moines, Cedar Rapids, Davenport, Sioux City, and Iowa City).

Prior to the 2015 football season, the stadium did not have permanent lights; the school contracted Musco Lighting's portable light trucks for night games in previous years. The school had installed permanent practice lights at the stadium in 2012.

By capacity, Kinnick Stadium is the 24th largest college football stadium, the 42nd largest sports stadium in the United States, and the 86th largest sports stadium in the world. On November 14, 2015, Iowa set the national collegiate wrestling dual-meet attendance record at Kinnick with over 42,000 fans in a victory over #1 Oklahoma State.

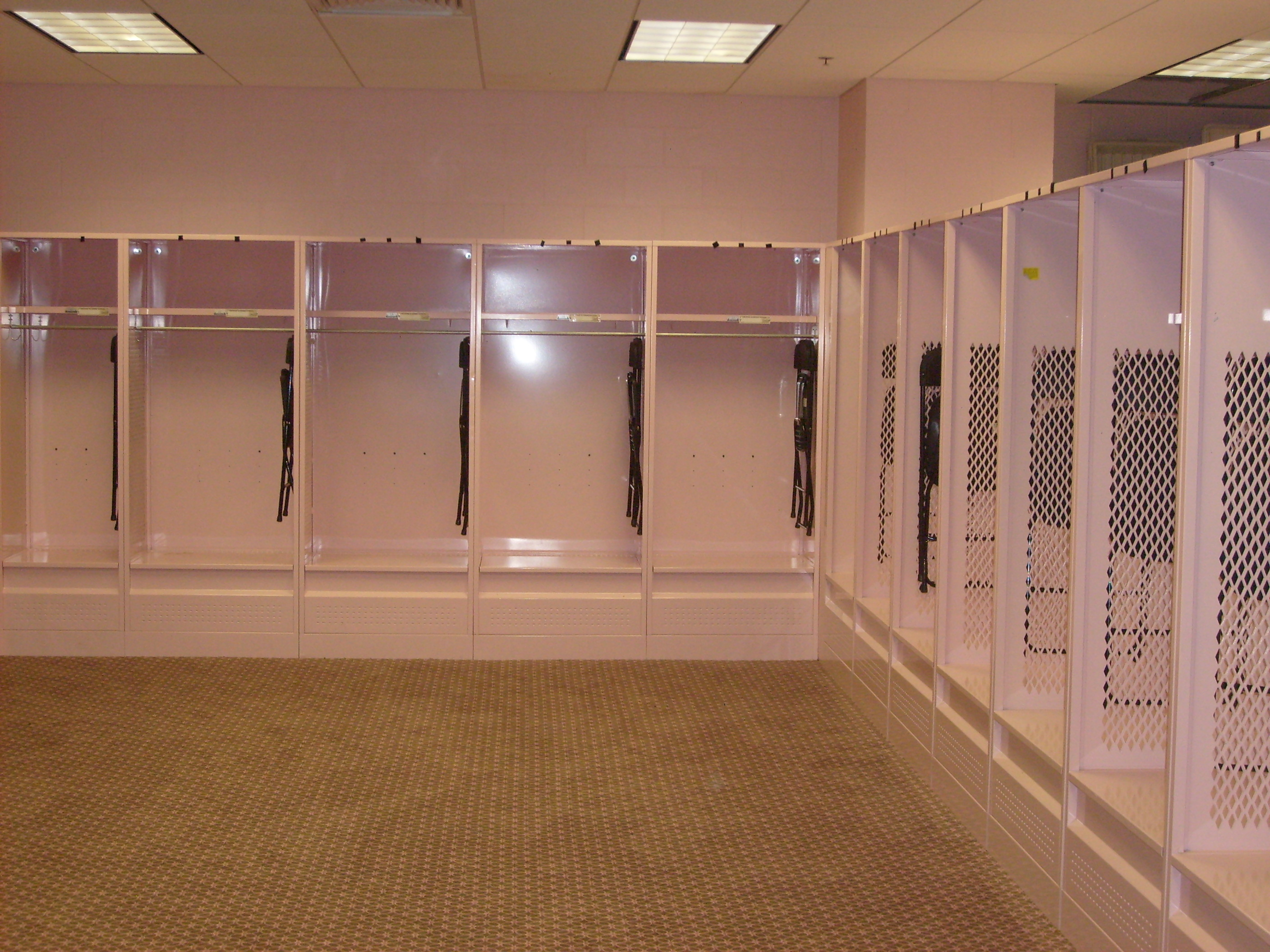
Inside the visitor's pink locker room inside Kinnick Stadium. Former Iowa coach Hayden Fry had the locker room painted pink.

Kinnick Stadium is well known for its pink visitors' locker rooms, a tradition started by emeritus Iowa coach Hayden Fry. Believing that pink would put opponents in a "passive mood", and because he thought that some believed pink was a "sissy color", Fry had the visiting locker rooms decorated completely in the color pink.

The pink locker room tradition has been continued with the newly renovated locker rooms, which include everything from pink urinals to pink lockers. Controversy flared during the 2005 season when a visiting law professor, along with other university faculty and students protested the pink coloration as demeaning to women and homosexuals. Despite these protests and with much student support, however, the locker room remains pink.

One thing we didn't paint black and gold was the stadium's visitors locker room, which we painted pink. It's a passive color, and we hoped it would put our opponents in a passive mood. Also, pink is often found in girls' bedrooms, and because of that some consider it a sissy color.

— Hayden Fry, Hayden Fry: A High Porch Picnic, p. 102

A more recent feature is the 20-foot-tall (6.1 m) bronze statue of Heisman Trophy winner Nile Kinnick, the statue depicts Kinnick dressed as a scholar, rather than in his football uniform. The bronze statue is placed near the team entrance to the stadium. When the renovation of the stadium was completed, and the statue unveiled, a tradition among the players began: one player, before entering the locker room, reached out and touched the helmet that was placed at Kinnick's feet. From that point on, all Iowa players, before entering the locker room, and after getting off the bus, walk up to the statue and rub the helmet, as a token of respect for Kinnick - the only Iowa player to ever win the Heisman Trophy. The on-field entrances to the stadium all have a picture of Nile Kinnick placed above the tunnel before exiting the tunnel to the field.

== The Children's Hospital and the Wave ==
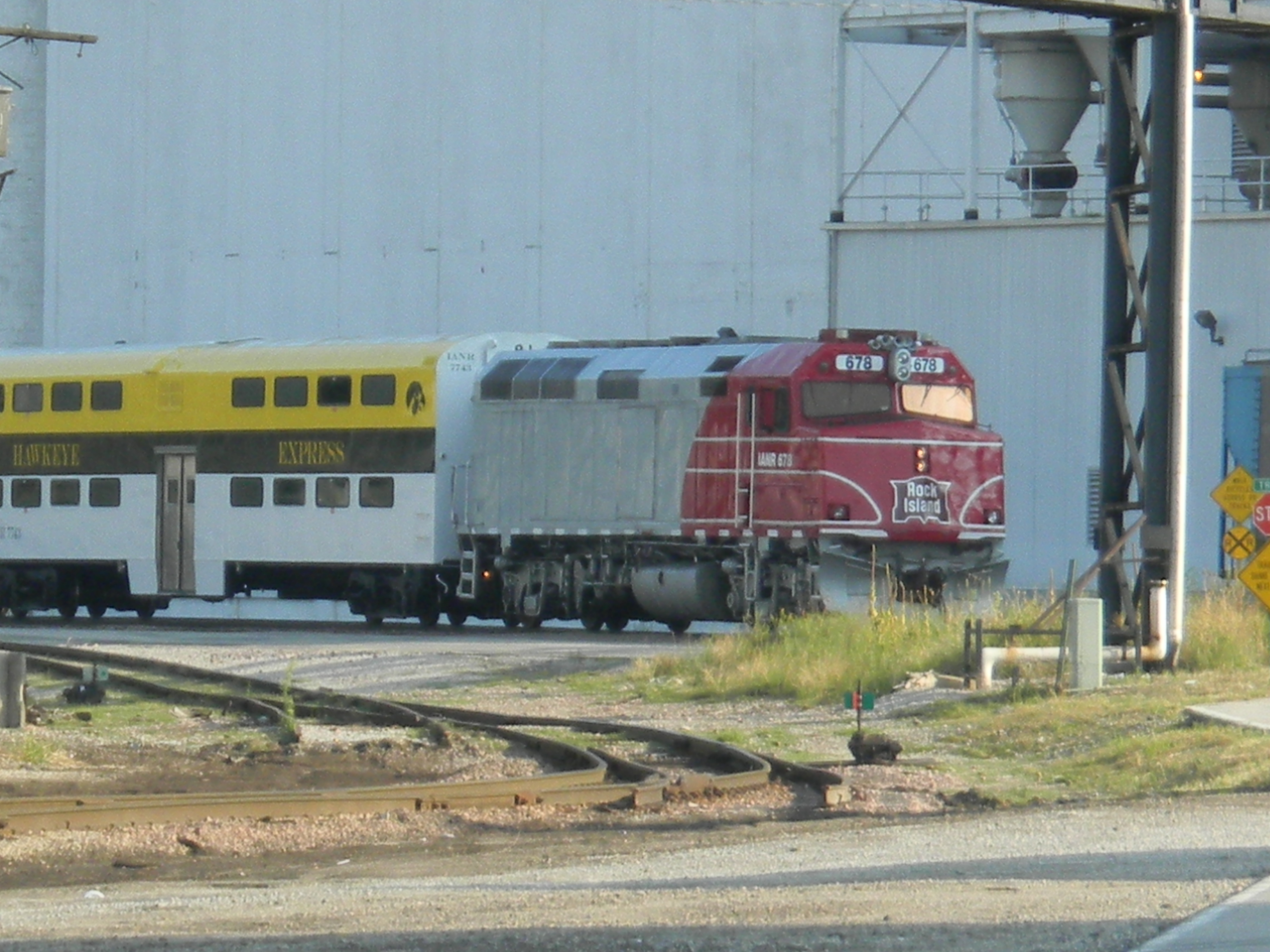
From 2004–2019, the Hawkeye Express train transported spectators to Kinnick Stadium from Coralville on game day.

The University of Iowa Children's Hospital's new building overlooks the East stands of Kinnick Stadium. The opening of the new hospital in 2017 led to the creation of what ESPN called "college football's coolest new tradition."

The new facility includes a top-floor lounge area known as the Press Box Cafe that has a view of the entire field, allowing patients and their families to see all Iowa home games live, and also includes big-screen TVs to allow them to watch Hawkeyes road games. A suggestion on a Hawkeyes Facebook fan page, by Iowan Krista Young, led to "The Wave" at Iowa home games. Following the first quarter, the crowd faces the hospital and waves at the patients and their families watching the game. For the Hawkeyes' first night home game of the 2017 season against Penn State, the fan site where the idea of "The Wave" originated encouraged fans to turn on their cell phone flashlights while they waved to the patients. This has been since renamed the "Iowa Wave" and "Kinnick Wave" to avoid confusion with the wave-motion movement where groups of fans stand up to make it seem like a tidal wave is going through the stadium. Ever since the “Kinnick Wave” began, players on both teams as well the on-field game officials join in on the tradition.

== Gallery ==
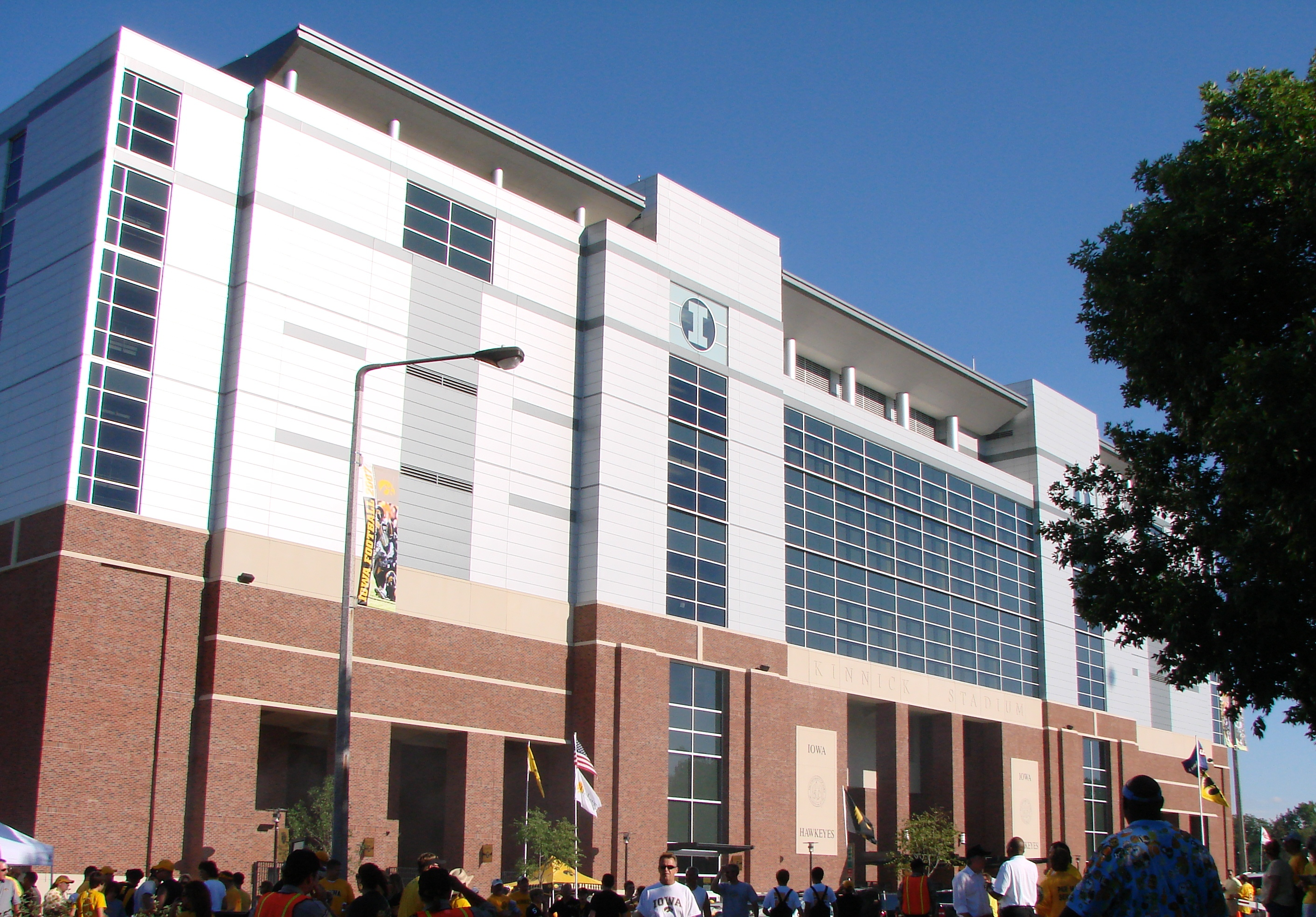
Stadium's press box from the outside

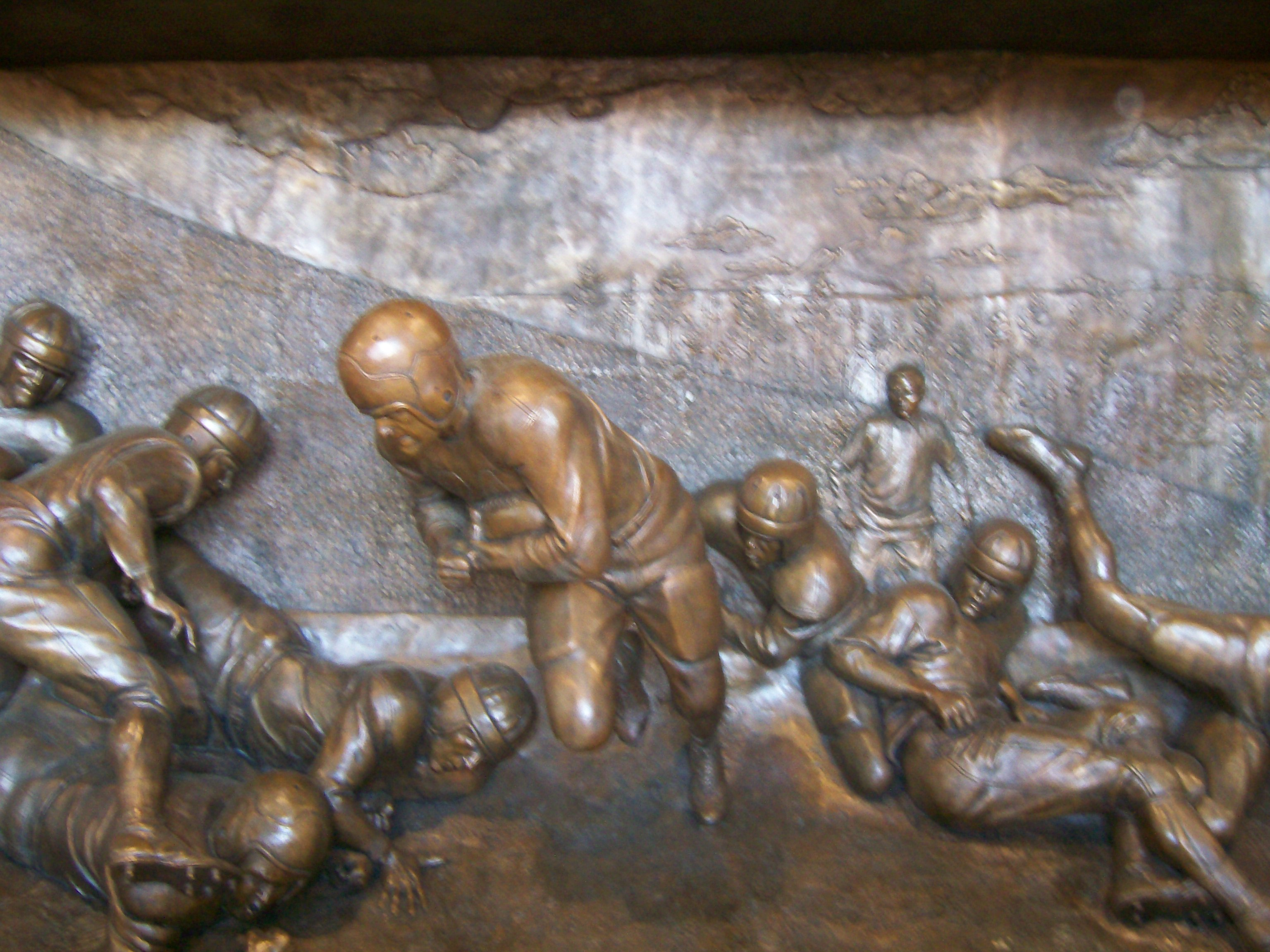
Relief of Nile Kinnick's famous touchdown against the University of Notre Dame in south end of the stadium

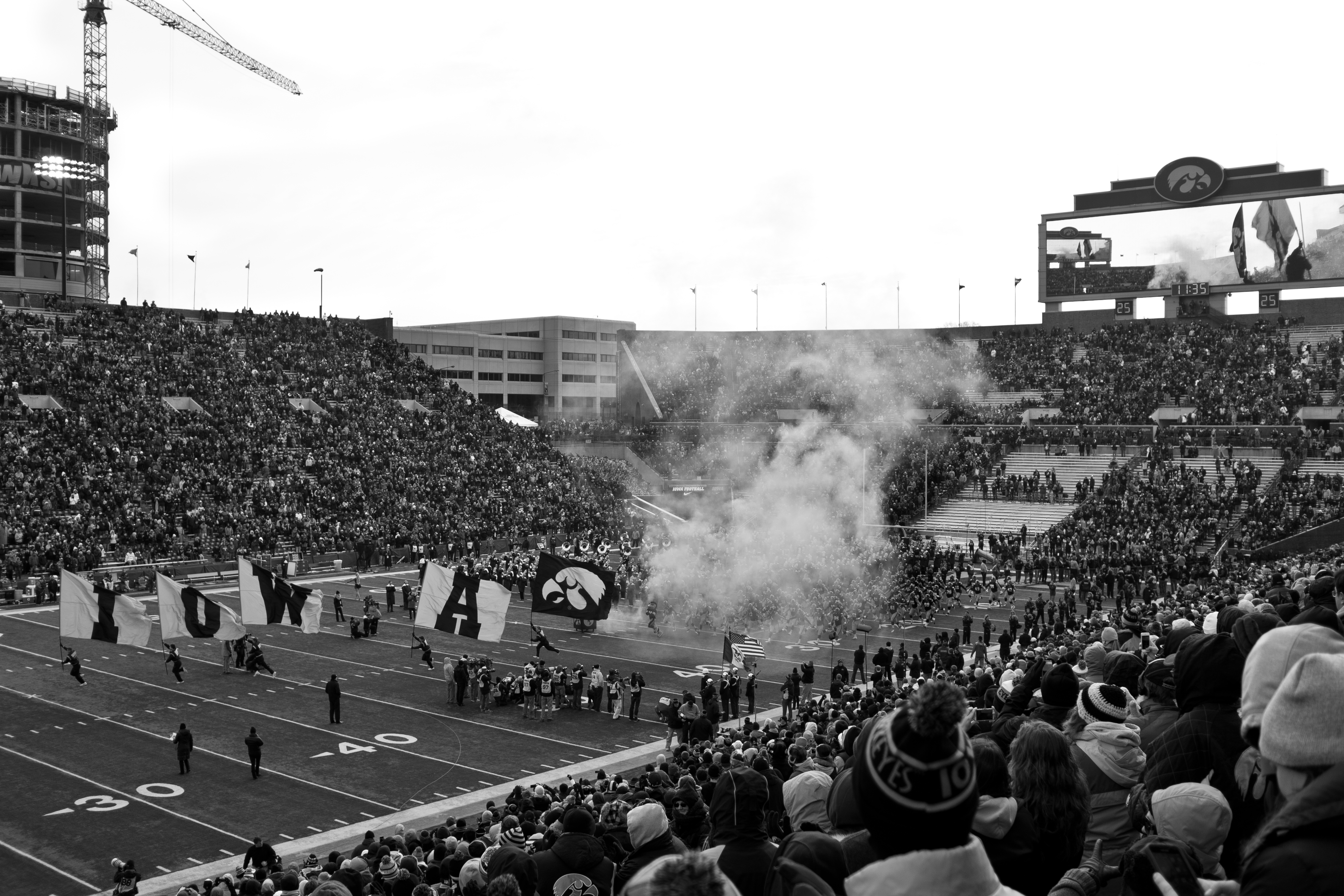
Iowa v Nebraska game in 2014

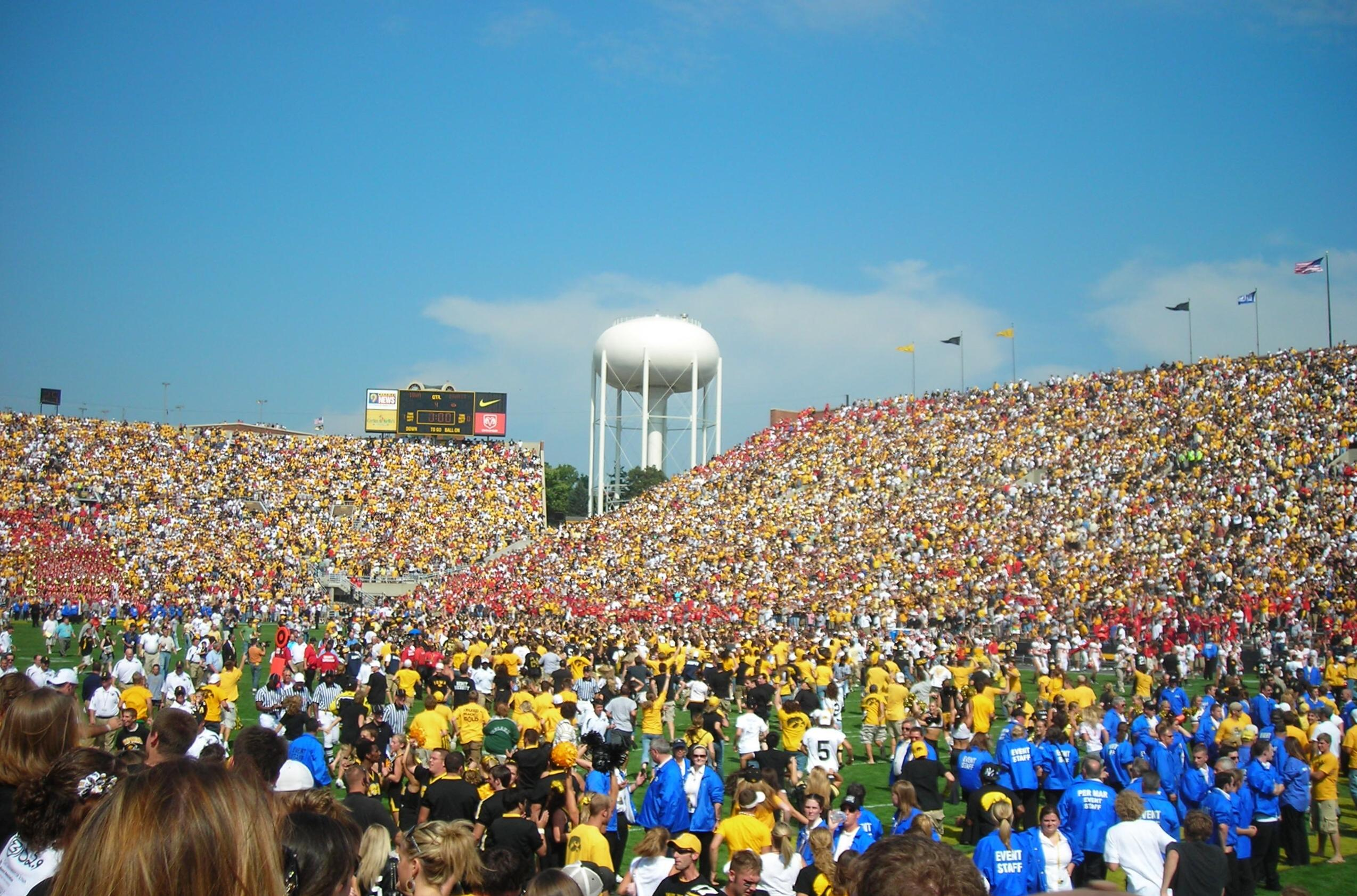
Students rushing renovated Kinnick Stadium following the Iowa-Iowa State game, September 16, 2006

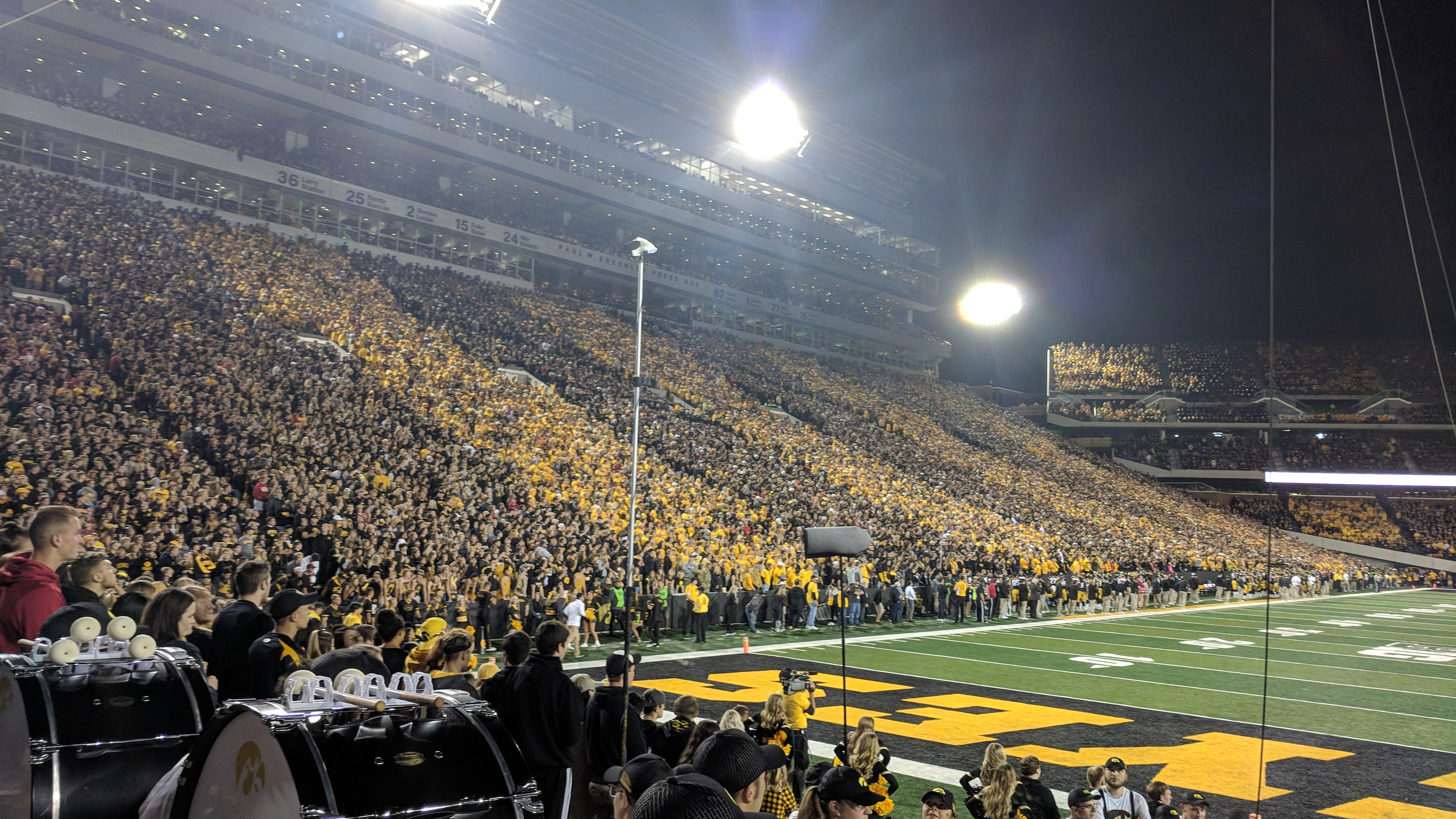
Stadium's west grandstand and pressbox during a game vs. Wisconsin, 2018

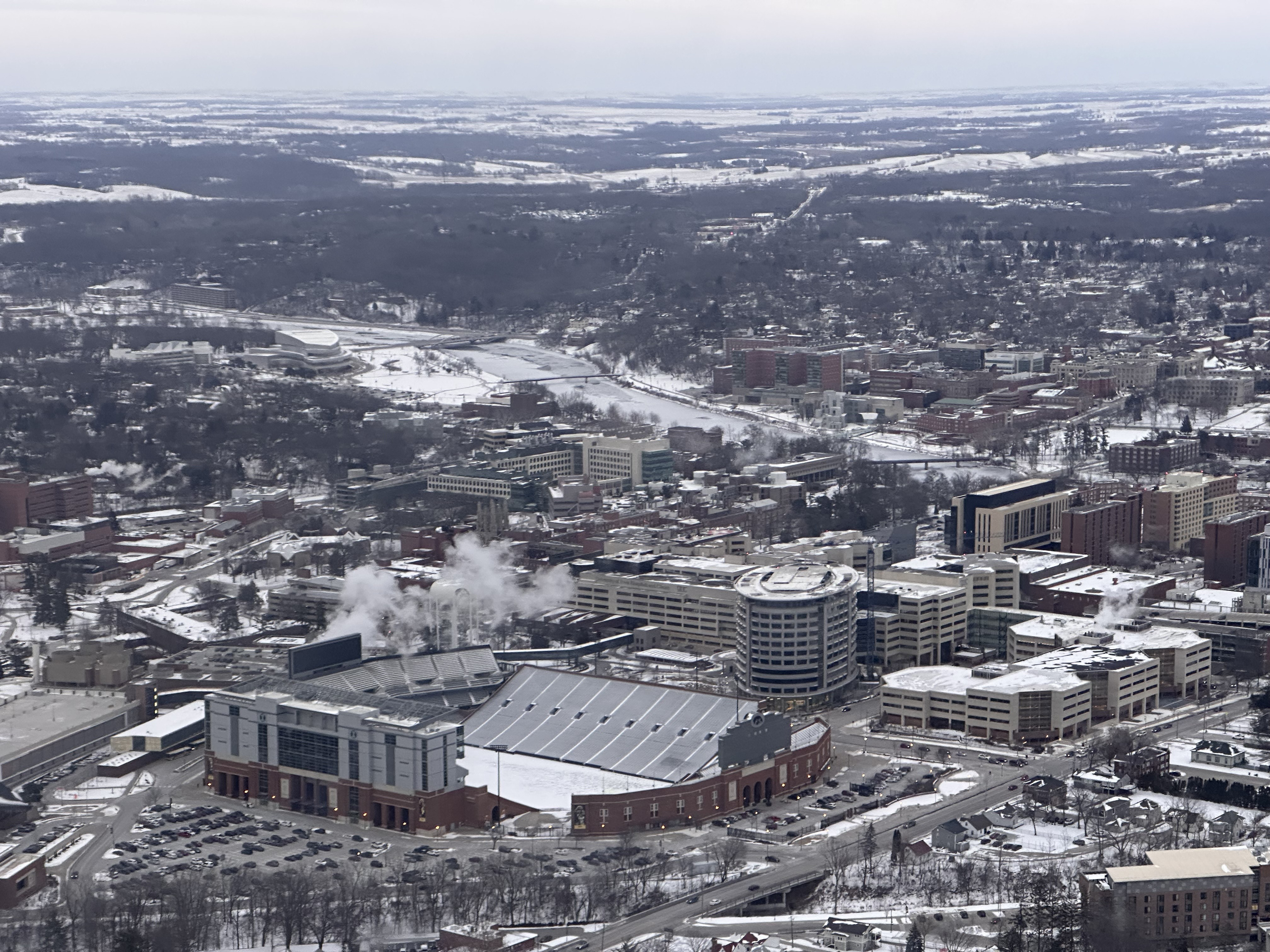
Aerial view of Kinnick Stadium.

== See also ==
- List of NCAA Division I FBS football stadiums
- Lists of stadiums
