= 2019 Auburn Tigers baseball team =

American college baseball season

2019 Auburn Tigers baseball

Atlanta Regional champions Chapel Hill Super Regional champions

College World Series, 0–2
- Conference: Southeastern Conference
- Western Division

Ranking
- Coaches: No. 9
- CB: No. 8
- Record: 38–28 (14–16 SEC)
- Head coach: Butch Thompson (4th season)
- Assistant coaches: Karl Nonemaker (1st season); Gabe Gross (2nd season)
- Pitching coach: Steve Smith (2nd season)
- Home stadium: Plainsman Park

2019 Southeastern Conference baseball standings
	Conf.						Overall
Team	W		L		T	PCT	W		L		T	PCT
Eastern
No. 1 Vanderbilt ^{x}‍†‍‡‍^{y}	23	–	7	–	0	.767	58	–	12	–	0	.829
No. 18 Georgia ‍‍‍^{y}	21	–	9	–	0	.700	46	–	17	–	0	.730
Tennessee ‍‍‍^{y}	14	–	16	–	0	.467	40	–	21	–	0	.656
Missouri ‍‍‍	13	–	16	–	1	.450	34	–	22	–	1	.605
Florida ‍‍‍^{y}	13	–	17	–	0	.433	34	–	26	–	0	.567
South Carolina ‍‍‍	8	–	22	–	0	.267	28	–	28	–	0	.500
Kentucky ‍‍‍	7	–	23	–	0	.233	26	–	29	–	0	.473
Western
No. 5 Mississippi State ^{x}‍‍‍^{y}	20	–	10	–	0	.667	52	–	15	–	0	.776
No. 6 Arkansas ^{x}‍‍‍^{y}	20	–	10	–	0	.667	46	–	20	–	0	.697
No. 14 LSU ‍‍‍^{y}	17	–	13	–	0	.567	40	–	26	–	0	.606
No. 20 Texas A&M ‍‍‍^{y}	16	–	13	–	1	.550	39	–	23	–	1	.627
No. 12 Ole Miss ‍‍‍^{y}	16	–	14	–	0	.533	41	–	27	–	0	.603
No. 9 Auburn ‍‍‍^{y}	14	–	16	–	0	.467	38	–	28	–	0	.576
Alabama ‍‍‍	7	–	23	–	0	.233	30	–	26	–	0	.536
x – Division champion † – Conference champion ‡ – Tournament champion y – Invited to the NCAA tournament As of June 25, 2019; Rankings from D1Baseball

The 2019 Auburn Tigers baseball team represented Auburn University in the 2019 NCAA Division I baseball season. The Tigers played their home games at Plainsman Park.

== Preseason ==
=== Preseason All-American teams ===
2nd Team

- Tanner Burns - Starting Pitcher (D1Baseball)
- Will Holland - Middle Infielder (Perfect Game)

3rd Team

- Tanner Burns - Starting Pitcher (Collegiate Baseball)
- Will Holland - Shortstop (D1Baseball)
- Will Holland - Shortstop (NCBWA)

=== SEC media poll ===
The SEC media poll was released on February 7, 2019 with the Tigers predicted to finish in fourth place in the Western Division.

Media poll (West)
Predicted finish	Team	Votes (1st place)
1	LSU	88 (10)
2	Ole Miss	65 (1)
3	Arkansas	59 (1)
4	Auburn	57 (1)
5	Texas A&M	48 (1)
6	Mississippi State	47
7	Alabama	21

=== Preseason All-SEC teams ===
1st Team

- Tanner Burns - Starting Pitcher

== Roster ==
2019 Auburn Tigers roster
Pitchers: 8 Bailey Horn - (redshirt) Sophomore; 12 Ryan Hoerter - Sophomore; 13 Davis Daniel - Junior; 14 Elliott Anderson - Junior; 18 Brooks Fuller - Freshman; 20 Cody Greenhill - Sophomore; 22 Ford Luttrell - (redshirt) Freshman; 23 Peyton Glavine - Sophomore; 25 Dawson Sweatt - Freshman; 29 Carson Skipper - Freshman; 31 Blake Schilleci - Senior; 32 Tanner Burns - Sophomore; 33 Will Morrison - Freshman; 36 Kyle Gray - (redshirt) Junior; 37 Ryan Watson - Junior; 40 Garrett Wade - Freshman; 43 Richard Fitts - (redshirt) Freshman; 44 Jack Owen - Sophomore	Catchers: 6 Matt Scheffler - Junior; 11 Chase Hall - (redshirt) Junior; 26 Troy Bearden - Freshman; Infielders: 2 Everett Lau - Junior; 3 Devin Warner - Freshman; 4 Rankin Woley - Junior; 5 Jarrett Eaton - Freshman; 7 Ed Johnson - Freshman; 9 Ryan Bliss - Freshman; 10 Edouard Julien - Sophomore; 17 Will Holland - Junior; 19 Brody Moore - Freshman; 21 Jackson Henderson - Junior; 38 Brett Olson - (redshirt) Senior	Outfielders: 1 Judd Ward - Sophomore; 16 Kason Howell - Freshman; 24 Conor Davis - Junior; 41 Steven Williams - Sophomore	Coaching staff: Butch Thompson – Head coach – 4th year; Karl Nonemaker – Assistant coach – 1st year; Gabe Gross – Assistant coach – 2nd year; Greg Drye – Director of operations – 3rd year

== Schedule and results ==
Legend
	Auburn win
	Auburn loss
	Postponement
**Bold**	Auburn team member

2019 Auburn Tigers baseball game log
Regular season (32–23)

February (6–2)
Date	Opponent	Rank	Site/stadium	Score	Win	Loss	Save	TV	Attendance	Overall record	SEC record
Feb. 15	Georgia Southern	No. 22	Plainsman Park; Auburn, Alabama	11–2	**Anderson (1–0)**	Shuman (0–1)	**Skipper (1)**	SECN+	3,053	1–0	–
Feb. 16	Georgia Southern	No. 22	Plainsman Park	5–7	McAlister (1–0)	**Watson (0–1)**		SECN+	4,096	1–1	–
Feb. 17	Georgia Southern	No. 22	Plainsman Park	4–3	**Owen (1–0)**	Roberts (0–1)			3,220	2–1	–
Feb. 19	Alabama A&M	No. 22	Plainsman Park	10–1	**Skipper (1–0)**	Diaz Jr. (0–1)		SECN+	2,457	3–1	–
Feb. 20	Alabama A&M	No. 22	Plainsman Park	10–2	**Wade (1–0)**	Hovermill (0–1)			2,365	4–1	–
Feb. 22	at UCF	No. 22	John Euliano Park; Orlando, Florida	4–1	**Burns (1–0)**	Schuermann (0–1)	**Greenhill (1)**		1,517	5–1	–
Feb. 23	at UCF	No. 22	John Euliano Park	1–6	Holloway (1–0)	**Gray (0–1)**			1,803	5–2	–
Feb. 24	at UCF	No. 22	John Euliano Park	13–9	**Skipper (2–0)**	Sinclair (1–1)			1,641	6–2	–

March (16–4)
Date	Opponent	Rank	Site/stadium	Score	Win	Loss	Save	TV	Attendance	Overall record	SEC record
Mar. 1	Cincinnati	No. 21	Plainsman Park	5–0	**Burns (2−0)**	Kullman (0–2)		SECN+	3,544	7–2	–
Mar. 2 (1)	Cincinnati	No. 21	Plainsman Park	5–0	**Owen (2–0)**	Kroger (0–1)	Greenhill (2)	SECN+	DH	8–2	–
Mar. 2 (2)	Cincinnati	No. 21	Plainsman Park	9–5	**Anderson (2–0)**	Batcho (0–2)	Fuller (1)	SECN+	7,387	9–2	–
Mar. 5	UT Martin	No. 19	Plainsman Park	15–9	**Fitts (1–0)**	O'Doherty (0–1)		SECN+	2,621	10–2	–
Mar. 6	UT Martin	No. 19	Plainsman Park	2–0	**Wade (2–0)**	Bullington (0–2)	Skipper (2)	SECN+	2,512	11–2	–
Mar. 8	UTSA	No. 19	Plainsman Park	6–0	**Burns (3–0)**	Patel (0–2)		SECN+	3,087	12–2	–
Mar. 9 (1)	UTSA	No. 19	Plainsman Park	5–0	**Owen (3–0)**	Foust (2–1)			DH	13–2	–
Mar. 9 (2)	UTSA	No. 19	Plainsman Park	8–3	**Fuller (1–0)**	Harrison (0–1)			6,569	14–2	–
Mar. 12	at South Alabama	No. 18	Eddie Stanky Field; Mobile, Alabama	6–2	**Wade (3–0)**	Proctor (0–2)			2,831	15–2	–
Mar. 15	No. 23 Tennessee	No. 18	Plainsman Park	2–0	**Anderson (3–0)**	Stallings (4–1)	Greenhill (3)	SECN+	3,060	16–2	1–0
Mar. 16	No. 23 Tennessee	No. 18	Plainsman Park	5–2	**Fuller (1–0)**	Linginfelter (4–1)		SECN	3,513	17–2	2–0
Mar. 17	No. 23 Tennessee	No. 18	Plainsman Park	5–3	**Gray (1–1)**	Crochet (1–1)		SECN+	3,401	18–2	3–0
Mar. 19	at UAB	No. 12	Regions Field; Birmingham, Alabama	13–5	**Horn (1–0)**	Bohannon (1–1)			4,037	19–2	–
Mar. 22	at No. 2 Mississippi State	No. 12	Dudy Noble Field; Starkville, Mississippi	6–5	**Anderson (4–0)**	White (1–1)	Greenhill (4)	SECN+	10,029	20–2	4–0
Mar. 23	at No. 2 Mississippi State	No. 12	Dudy Noble Field	2–15	Ginn (6–0)	**Skipper (3–1)**		SECN+	12,343	20–3	4–1
Mar. 24	at No. 2 Mississippi State	No. 12	Dudy Noble Field	15–20	Gordon (3–0)	**Greenhill (0–1)**		SECN+	9,886	20–4	4–2
Mar. 26	vs. Alabama	No. 15	Montgomery Riverwalk Stadium; Montgomery, Alabama	3–6	Randolph (1–0)	**Gray (1–2)**		SECN	7,896	20–5	–
Mar. 29	at South Carolina	No. 15	Founders Park; Columbia, South Carolina	4–2	**Burns (4–0)**	Lloyd (2–2)	Greenhill (5)	SECN+	6,898	21–5	5–2
Mar. 30	at South Carolina	No. 15	Founders Park	0–4	Morgan (3–0)	**Fuller (1–1)**		SECN	7,390	21–6	5–3
Mar. 31	at South Carolina	No. 15	Founders Park	7–5	**Fitts (2–0)**	Shook (2–1)	Greenhill (6)	SECN	6,564	22–6	6–3

April (5–11)
Date	Opponent	Rank	Site/stadium	Score	Win	Loss	Save	TV	Attendance	Overall record	SEC record
April 2	Georgia Tech	No. 15	Plainsman Park	3–9	Hughes (3–2)	**Gray (1–3)**		SECN+	3,626	22–7	–
April 5 (1)	No. 14 Arkansas	No. 15	Plainsman Park	6–3	**Anderson (5–0)**	Kopps (1–3)	**Greenhill (7)**	SECN+	DH	23–7	7–3
April 5 (2)	No. 14 Arkansas	No. 15	Plainsman Park	6–9	Kopps (2–3)	**Skipper (3–2)**		SECN+	7,332	23–8	7–4
April 6	No. 14 Arkansas	No. 15	Plainsman Park	0–8	Wicklander (3–1)	**Fitts (2–1)**	Vermillion (1)	SECN+	3,731	23–9	7–5
April 9	Jacksonville State	No. 22	Plainsman Park	6–11	Gilliland (1–0)	**Anderson (5–1)**		SECN+	2,838	23–10	–
April 12	at No. 10 Texas A&M	No. 22	Olsen Field at Blue Bell Park; College Station, Texas	0–4	Doxakis (4–2)	**Burns (4–1)**		SECN+	5,873	23–11	7–6
April 13	at No. 10 Texas A&M	No. 22	Olsen Field at Blue Bell Park	7–0	**Fuller (2–1)**	Lacy (6–1)	**Greenhill (8)**	SECN+	7,037	24–11	8–6
April 14	at No. 10 Texas A&M	No. 22	Olsen Field at Blue Bell Park	1–4	Weber (2–0)	**Fitts (2–2)**	Kalich (9)	SECN+	5,516	24–12	8–7
April 16	at No. 11 Georgia Tech		Russ Chandler Stadium; Atlanta, Georgia	6–11	Hughes (5–2)	**Schilleci (0–1)**		ACCN Extra	1,657	24–13	–
April 18	No. 15 Ole Miss		Plainsman Park	7–4	**Fitts (3–2)**	Ethridge (5–3)	**Greenhill (9)**	SECN+	3,409	25–13	9–7
April 19	No. 15 Ole Miss		Plainsman Park	3–5	Nikhazy (4–3)	**Burns (4–2)**	Caracci (8)	SECN+	3,100	25–14	9–8
April 20	No. 15 Ole Miss		Plainsman Park	6–5	**Greenhill (1–1)**	Caracci (1–2)		SECN+	3,614	26–14	10–8
April 23	at Jacksonville State	No. 25	Rudy Abbott Field; Jacksonville, Alabama	14–2	**Glavine (1–0)**	Gilliland (1–1)		ESPN+	1,882	27–14	–
April 25	at No. 5 Vanderbilt	No. 25	Hawkins Field; Nashville, Tennessee	6–12	Fellows (9–0)	**Burns (4–3)**	Hickman (3)	ESPNU	3,050	27–15	10–9
April 26	at No. 5 Vanderbilt	No. 25	Hawkins Field	2-5	Rocker (5–4)	**Fitts (3–3)**	Fisher (3)	SECN	3,534	27–16	10–10
April 27	at No. 5 Vanderbilt	No. 25	Hawkins Field	5-9	Raby (7–1)	**Fuller (2–2)**		SECN+	3,626	27–17	10–11

May (5–6)
Date	Opponent	Rank	Site/stadium	Score	Win	Loss	Save	TV	Attendance	Overall record	SEC record
May 3	Alabama		Plainsman Park	5–1	**Owen (4–0)**	Finnerty (6–6)		SECN+	3,982	28–17	11–11
May 4	Alabama		Plainsman Park	6–7	Randolph (2–2)	**Greenhill (1–2)**	Medders (1)	SECN	3,532	28–18	11–12
May 5	Alabama		Plainsman Park	17–7	**Horn (2–0)**	Guffey (0–1)		SECN	3,665	29–18	12–12
May 7	UAB		Plainsman Park	4–6	Wesson (2–2)	**Skipper (3–3)**	Calvert (4)	SECN+	2,797	29–19	–
May 10	No. 7 Georgia		Plainsman Park	2–11	Locey (9–1)	**Owen (4–1)**		SECN+	3,703	29–20	12–13
May 11 (1)	No. 7 Georgia		Plainsman Park	4–3	**Greenhill (2–2)**	Wilcox (2–1)		SECN+	DH	30–20	13–13
May 11 (2)	No. 7 Georgia		Plainsman Park	8–10	Kristofak (4–0)	**Schilleci (0–2)**		SECN+	3,340	30–21	13–14
May 14	North Alabama		Plainsman Park	8–7	**Gray (2–3)**	Gillum (0–2)		SECN+	3,310	31–21	–
May 16	at No. 20 LSU		Alex Box Stadium; Baton Rouge, Louisiana	1–7	Walker (5–4)	**Anderson (5–2)**		SECN+	10,305	31–22	13–15
May 17	at No. 20 LSU		Alex Box Stadium	1–5	Marceaux (4–2)	**Owen (4–2)**	Hess (2)	SECN+	11,009	31–23	13–16
May 18	at No. 20 LSU		Alex Box Stadium	5–4	**Watson (1–1)**	Hess (3–5)	**Fuller (1)**	SECN+	10,681	32–23	14–16

Postseason (6–3)

SEC Tournament (1–2)
Date	Opponent	Seed/Rank	Site/stadium	Score	Win	Loss	Save	TV	Attendance	Overall record	SECT Record
May 21	vs. (9) Tennessee	(8)	Hoover Metropolitan Stadium; Hoover, Alabama	5–3	**Horn (3–0)**	Stallings (8–4)	**Greenhill (10)**	SECN		33–23	1–0
May 22	vs. (1) Vanderbilt	(8)	Hoover Metropolitan Stadium	1–11	Hickman (7–0)	**Gray (2–4)**		SECN		33–24	1–1
May 23	vs. (5) LSU	(8)	Hoover Metropolitan Stadium	3–4	Peterson (5–2)	**Greenhill (2–3)**		SECN	6,891	33–25	1–2

Atlanta Regional (3–0)
Date	Opponent	Seed/Rank	Site/stadium	Score	Win	Loss	Save	TV	Attendance	Overall record	Regional Record
May 31	vs. (3) Coastal Carolina	(2)	Russ Chandler Stadium; Atlanta, Georgia	16–7	**Anderson (6–2)**	Veneziano (5–3)		ESPNU	2,487	34–25	1–0
June 1	vs. (1) No. 3 Georgia Tech	(2)	Russ Chandler Stadium	6–5	**Fitts (4–3)**	Thomas (9–2)		SECN	3,718	35–25	2–0
June 2	vs. (1) No. 3 Georgia Tech	(2)	Russ Chandler Stadium	4–1	**Horn (4–0)**	Carpenter (1–2)	**Greenhill (11)**	ESPN3	3,718	36–25	3–0

Chapel Hill Super Regional (2–1)
Date	Opponent	Seed/Rank	Site/stadium	Score	Win	Loss	Save	TV	Attendance	Overall record	Regional Record
June 8	vs. (1) No. 14 North Carolina	(2)	Boshamer Stadium; Chapel Hill, North Carolina	11–7	**Anderson (7–2)**	Lancellotti (6–3)	**Greenhill (12)**	ESPN2	3,699	37–25	1–0
June 9	vs. (1) No. 14 North Carolina	(2)	Boshamer Stadium	0–2	Love (8–4)	**Horn (4–1)**		ESPN	3,718	37–26	1–1
June 10	vs. (1) No. 14 North Carolina	(2)	Boshamer Stadium	14–7	**Fitts (5–3)**	Lancellotti (6–4)		ESPN2	4,089	38–26	2–1

College World Series (0–2)
Date	Opponent	Seed/Rank	Site/stadium	Score	Win	Loss	Save	TV	Attendance	Overall record	CWS record
June 16	vs. No. 6 Mississippi State		TD Ameritrade Park; Omaha, Nebraska	4–5	Gordon (5–0)	**Burns** (4–4)		ESPN2	22,671	38–27	0–1
June 18	vs. No. 7 Louisville		TD Ameritrade Park	3–5	Elliott (3–2)	**Horn** (4–2)	Kirian (5)	ESPN	14,481	38–28	0–2

† Indicates the game does not count toward the 2019 Southeastern Conference standings.
*Rankings are based on the team's current ranking in the D1Baseball poll.

== Atlanta Regional ==
Atlanta Regional Teams
(1) Georgia Tech Yellow Jackets	(2) Auburn Tigers	(3) Coastal Carolina Chanticleers	(4) Florida A&M Rattlers

First Round
1	Georgia Tech	13
4	Florida A&M	2
3	Coastal Carolina	7
2	Auburn	16
Lower round 1
4	Florida A&M	4
3	Coastal Carolina	9

Semi-Finals
1	Georgia Tech	5
2	Auburn	6
Lower final
1	Georgia Tech	10
3	Coastal Carolina	8

Finals
2	Auburn	4
1	Georgia Tech	1

== Record vs. conference opponents ==
Last two do not qualify for conf. tourn. Blank are not scheduled. Blue are home games, otherwise away.

2019 SEC baseball records Source: 2019 SEC baseball game results
Team	W–L	ALA	ARK	AUB	FLA	UGA	KEN	LSU	MSU	MIZZ	MISS	SCAR	TENN	TAMU	VAN	Team	Div	SR	SW
ALA	7–23		1–2	1–2	0–3	0–3	.	1–2	0–3	.	1–2	2–1	.	1–2	0–3	ALA	W7	1–9	0–4
ARK	20–10	2–1		2–1	.	.	2–1	3–0	2–1	3–0	1–2	.	3–0	1–2	1–2	ARK	W1	7–3	3–0
AUB	14–16	2–1	1–2		.	1–2	.	1–2	1–2	.	2–1	2–1	3–0	1–2	0–3	AUB	W6	4–6	1–1
FLA	13–17	3–0	.	.		0–3	2–1	1–2	1–2	3–0	0–3	2–1	1–2	.	0–3	FLA	E5	4–6	2–3
UGA	21–9	3–0	.	2–1	3–0		2–1	2–1	0–3	3–0	.	3–0	1–2	.	2–1	UGA	E2	8–2	4–1
KEN	7–23	.	1–2	.	1–2	1–2		0–3	.	1–2	2–1	1–2	0–3	0–3	0–3	KEN	E7	1–9	0–4
LSU	17–13	2–1	0–3	2–1	2–1	1–2	3–0		3–0	1–2	1–2	.	.	2–1	.	LSU	W3	6–4	2–1
MSU	20–10	3–0	1–2	2–1	2–1	3–0	.	0–3		.	3–0	2–1	2–1	2–1	.	MSU	W2	8–2	3–1
MIZZ	13–16	.	0–3	.	0–3	0–3	2–1	2–1	.		2–1	3–0	2–1	1–1	1–2	MIZZ	E4	5–4	1–3
MISS	16–14	2–1	2–1	1–2	3–0	.	1–2	2–1	0–3	1–2		.	1–2	3–0	.	MISS	W5	5–5	2–1
SCAR	8–22	1–2	.	1–2	1–2	0–3	2–1	.	1–2	0–3	.		1–2	1–2	0–3	SCAR	E6	1–9	0–3
TENN	14–16	.	0–3	0–3	2–1	2–1	3–0	.	1–2	1–2	2–1	2–1		.	1–2	TENN	E3	5–5	1–2
TAMU	16–13	2–1	2–1	2–1	.	.	3–0	1–2	1–2	1–1	0–3	2–1	.		2–1	TAMU	W4	6–3	1–1
VAN	23–7	3–0	2–1	3–0	3–0	1–2	3–0	.	.	2–1	.	3–0	2–1	1–2		VAN	E1	8–2	5–0
Team	W–L	ALA	ARK	AUB	FLA	UGA	KEN	LSU	MSU	MIZZ	MISS	SCAR	TENN	TAMU	VAN	Team	Div	SR	SW

Updated for entire regular season. Missouri at Texas A&M series had one tie game.

== Rankings ==
Ranking movements Legend: ██ Increase in ranking ██ Decrease in ranking
	Week																	
Poll	Pre	1	2	3	4	5	6	7	8	9	10	11	12	13	14	15	16	Final
Coaches'	20	20*																
Baseball America	17																	
Collegiate Baseball^	23																	
NCBWA†	19																	
D1Baseball	22	22	21	19	18	12	15	15										

^ Collegiate Baseball ranked 40 teams in their preseason poll, but only ranked 30 teams weekly during the season.
† NCBWA ranks 30 teams in their preseason poll, but only ranks 25 teams weekly during the season.
* A new poll was not released for this week, so for comparison purposes, the previous week's ranking is inserted in this week's slot.

== 2019 MLB draft ==
Player	Position	Round	Overall	MLB team
Will Holland	SS	5	149	Minnesota Twins
Davis Daniel	RHP	7	211	Los Angeles Angels
Edouard Julien	3B	18	539	Minnesota Twins
Jack Owen	LHP	21	635	St. Louis Cardinals
Elliott Anderson	LHP	23	679	Kansas City Royals
