= 2019 Ole Miss Rebels baseball team =

American college baseball season

2019 Ole Miss Rebels baseball

Oxford Regional champions

Fayetteville Super Regional, 1–2 vs. Arkansas
- Conference: Southeastern Conference
- Western Division

Ranking
- Coaches: No. 15
- CB: No. 17
- Record: 41–27 (16–14 SEC)
- Head coach: Mike Bianco (19th season)
- Assistant coach: Marc MacMillan (4th season)
- Hitting coach: Mike Clement (5th season)
- Pitching coach: Carl Lafferty (13th season)
- Home stadium: Swayze Field

2019 Southeastern Conference baseball standings
| | Conf. | | | | | | Overall |
| Team | W | | L | | T | PCT | W | | L | | T | PCT |
|---|---|---|---|---|---|---|---|---|---|---|---|---|
Eastern
| No. 1 Vanderbilt ^{x}‍†‍‡‍^{y} | 23 | – | 7 | – | 0 | .767 | 58 | – | 12 | – | 0 | .829 |
| No. 18 Georgia ‍‍‍^{y} | 21 | – | 9 | – | 0 | .700 | 46 | – | 17 | – | 0 | .730 |
| Tennessee ‍‍‍^{y} | 14 | – | 16 | – | 0 | .467 | 40 | – | 21 | – | 0 | .656 |
| Missouri ‍‍‍ | 13 | – | 16 | – | 1 | .450 | 34 | – | 22 | – | 1 | .605 |
| Florida ‍‍‍^{y} | 13 | – | 17 | – | 0 | .433 | 34 | – | 26 | – | 0 | .567 |
| South Carolina ‍‍‍ | 8 | – | 22 | – | 0 | .267 | 28 | – | 28 | – | 0 | .500 |
| Kentucky ‍‍‍ | 7 | – | 23 | – | 0 | .233 | 26 | – | 29 | – | 0 | .473 |
Western
| No. 5 Mississippi State ^{x}‍‍‍^{y} | 20 | – | 10 | – | 0 | .667 | 52 | – | 15 | – | 0 | .776 |
| No. 6 Arkansas ^{x}‍‍‍^{y} | 20 | – | 10 | – | 0 | .667 | 46 | – | 20 | – | 0 | .697 |
| No. 14 LSU ‍‍‍^{y} | 17 | – | 13 | – | 0 | .567 | 40 | – | 26 | – | 0 | .606 |
| No. 20 Texas A&M ‍‍‍^{y} | 16 | – | 13 | – | 1 | .550 | 39 | – | 23 | – | 1 | .627 |
| No. 12 Ole Miss ‍‍‍^{y} | 16 | – | 14 | – | 0 | .533 | 41 | – | 27 | – | 0 | .603 |
| No. 9 Auburn ‍‍‍^{y} | 14 | – | 16 | – | 0 | .467 | 38 | – | 28 | – | 0 | .576 |
| Alabama ‍‍‍ | 7 | – | 23 | – | 0 | .233 | 30 | – | 26 | – | 0 | .536 |
x – Division champion † – Conference champion ‡ – Tournament champion y – Invited to the NCAA tournament As of June 25, 2019; Rankings from D1Baseball

The 2019 Ole Miss Rebels baseball team represented the University of Mississippi in the 2019 NCAA Division I baseball season. The Rebels played their home games at Swayze Field.

== Previous season ==
The Rebels finished 48–17 overall, and 18–12 in the conference. The Rebels tied their school record for wins, won a share of the SEC Western Division Championship, and won the SEC tournament. The Rebels entered the 2018 NCAA Division I baseball tournament as the #4 National Seed. The Rebels looked to continue their hot streak as they won the first 2 games of the Oxford Regional. However, the Rebels were upset twice in one day by the Tennessee Tech Golden Eagles to spoil their trip to the Super Regionals.

=== 2018 MLB draft selections ===
The Rebels had eight players selected in the 2018 MLB draft. The Rebels also had two signees drafted out of high school.

| Player | Position | Round | Overall | MLB Team |
|---|---|---|---|---|
| Ryan Rolison | Pitcher | 1 | 22 | Colorado Rockies |
| Gunnar Hoglund† | Pitcher | CBA | 36 | Pittsburgh Pirates |
| Nick Fortes | Catcher | 4 | 117 | Miami Marlins |
| Brady Feigl | Pitcher | 5 | 143 | Oakland Athletics |
| James McArthur | Pitcher | 12 | 347 | Philadelphia Phillies |
| Dallas Woolfolk | Pitcher | 13 | 383 | Oakland Athletics |
| **Ryan Olenek** | Pitcher | 17 | 496 | San Francisco Giants |
| Will Golsan | Outfielder | 26 | 786 | Colorado Rockies |
| **Parker Caracci** | Pitcher | 37 | 1106 | Toronto Blue Jays |
| Kaleb Hill† | Pitcher | 39 | 1183 | Cleveland Indians |

Players in bold returned to Ole Miss.
†Both Gunnar Hoglund and Kaleb Hill were drafted out of high school, but decided to attend Ole Miss.

== Preseason ==
=== Preseason All-American teams ===
1st Team

- Parker Caracci - Relief Pitcher (Perfect Game)

2nd Team

- Parker Caracci - Relief Pitcher (Collegiate Baseball)
- Parker Caracci - Relief Pitcher (D1Baseball)
- Parker Caracci - Relief Pitcher (NCBWA)

3rd Team

- Parker Caracci - Relief Pitcher (Baseball America)
- Thomas Dillard - Outfielder (D1Baseball)
- Ryan Olenek - Outfielder (Collegiate Baseball)

=== SEC media poll ===
The SEC media poll was released on February 7, 2019 with the Rebels predicted to finish in second place in the Western Division.

Media poll (West)
| Predicted finish | Team | Votes (1st place) |
| 1 | LSU | 88 (10) |
| 2 | Ole Miss | 65 (1) |
| 3 | Arkansas | 59 (1) |
| 4 | Auburn | 57 (1) |
| 5 | Texas A&M | 48 (1) |
| 6 | Mississippi State | 47 |
| 7 | Alabama | 21 |

=== Preseason All-SEC teams ===
1st Team

- Cole Zabowski - First Baseman

2nd Team

- Tyler Keenan - Third Baseman
- Chase Cockrell - Designated Hitter/Utility
- Parker Caracci - Relief Pitcher

== Roster ==
2019 Ole Miss Rebels baseball team
Players
Coaches

| # | Pos. | Name | B/T | Height | Weight | Year | Previous school | Home town |
|---|---|---|---|---|---|---|---|---|
| 1 | INF | Jacob Adams | L/R | 5 ft 10 in (1.78 m) | 170 lb (77 kg) | Sr | Conway High School; Crowder College | Conway, AR |
| 2 | OF | Ryan Olenek | R/R | 6 ft 4 in (1.93 m) | 190 lb (86 kg) | Sr | Trinity Preparatory School | Winter Park, FL |
| 3 | INF | Anthony Servideo | L/R | 5 ft 10 in (1.78 m) | 170 lb (77 kg) | So | Jupiter High School | Jupiter, FL |
| 4 | C | Knox Loposer | R/R | 5 ft 10 in (1.78 m) | 195 lb (88 kg) | Fr | Jackson Preparatory School | Madison, MS |
| 6 | OF | Thomas Dillard | S/R | 6 ft 0 in (1.83 m) | 230 lb (104 kg) | Jr | Oxford High School | Oxford, MS |
| 7 | OF | Josh Hall | L/R | 5 ft 9 in (1.75 m) | 185 lb (84 kg) | Fr | Homewood High School | Birmingham, AL |
| 8 | INF | Justin Bench | R/R | 6 ft 0 in (1.83 m) | 180 lb (82 kg) | Fr | Calvary Christian High School | Redington Beach, FL |
| 9 | OF | Michael Spears (redshirt) | R/R | 5 ft 11 in (1.8 m) | 190 lb (86 kg) | So | Orangewood Christian High School | Winter Park, FL |
| 10 | INF | Tyler Keenan | L/R | 6 ft 3 in (1.91 m) | 240 lb (109 kg) | So | Cleveland High School | Clayton, NC |
| 11 | OF | Chase Cockrell | R/R | 6 ft 4 in (1.93 m) | 225 lb (102 kg) | Sr | Oak Grove High School; Hinds Community College | Bastrop, LA |
| 12 | RHP | Greer Holston | R/R | 6 ft 4 in (1.93 m) | 220 lb (100 kg) | Jr | IMG Academy | Long Beach, MS |
| 13 | C | Cooper Johnson | R/R | 6 ft 0 in (1.83 m) | 215 lb (98 kg) | Jr | Carmel Catholic High School | Mundelein, IL |
| 14 | INF | Cole Zabowski | L/L | 6 ft 5 in (1.96 m) | 240 lb (109 kg) | Jr | Collins Hill High School | Lawrenceville, GA |
| 15 | INF | Grae Kessinger | R/R | 6 ft 2 in (1.88 m) | 200 lb (91 kg) | Jr | Oxford High School | Oxford, MS |
| 17 | RHP | Gunnar Hoglund | L/R | 6 ft 4 in (1.93 m) | 225 lb (102 kg) | Fr | Fivay High School | Hudson, FL |
| 18 | RHP | Connor Green | R/R | 6 ft 4 in (1.93 m) | 225 lb (102 kg) | Sr | St. George's Independent School | Collierville, TN |
| 19 | C | Hunter Nabors (redshirt) | R/R | 5 ft 11 in (1.8 m) | 215 lb (98 kg) | Jr | Montevallo High School; Itawamba Community College | Montevallo, AL |
| 20 | RHP | Will Ethridge | R/R | 6 ft 5 in (1.96 m) | 240 lb (109 kg) | Jr | Parkview High School | Lilburn, GA |
| 21 | LHP | Jordan Fowler | L/L | 6 ft 3 in (1.91 m) | 180 lb (82 kg) | So | Dyer County High School | Union City, TN |
| 22 | LHP | Kaleb Hill | R/L | 6 ft 3 in (1.91 m) | 220 lb (100 kg) | Fr | Watson Chapel High School | Pine Bluff, AR |
| 24 | LHP | Zack Phillips | L/L | 6 ft 0 in (1.83 m) | 170 lb (77 kg) | Jr | Texas High School; Grayson College | Texarkana, AR |
| 25 | OF | Tim Elko | R/R | 6 ft 4 in (1.93 m) | 225 lb (102 kg) | So | Hillsborough High School | Lutz, FL |
| 26 | LHP | Doug Nikhazy | L/L | 5 ft 10 in (1.78 m) | 200 lb (91 kg) | Fr | West Orange High School | Windermere, FL |
| 27 | RHP | Taylor Broadway | R/R | 5 ft 11 in (1.8 m) | 205 lb (93 kg) | Jr | Cypress Christian School; Tyler Junior College | Cypress, TX |
| 28 | RHP | Austin Miller | R/R | 6 ft 7 in (2.01 m) | 225 lb (102 kg) | Jr | Iowa City West High School; Kirkwood Community College | North Liberty, IA |
| 29 | RHP | Max Cioffi | R/R | 6 ft 4 in (1.93 m) | 220 lb (100 kg) | So | St. Patrick High School | Chicago, IL |
| 31 | RHP | Colin Coates (redshirt) | R/R | 6 ft 0 in (1.83 m) | 205 lb (93 kg) | Sr | DeSoto Central High School; Hinds Community College | Nesbit, MS |
| 32 | INF | Michael Fitzsimmons | R/R | 6 ft 1 in (1.85 m) | 230 lb (104 kg) | RS Sr | Memphis University School | Eads, TN |
| 34 | RHP | Tyler Myers | R/R | 6 ft 1 in (1.85 m) | 190 lb (86 kg) | Jr | J. Frank Dobie High School; Paris Junior College | Houston, TX |
| 35 | INF | Kevin Graham | L/R | 6 ft 0 in (1.83 m) | 195 lb (88 kg) | Fr | Westminster Christian Academy | O'Fallon, MO |
| 38 | RHP | Logan Savell (redshirt) | R/R | 6 ft 4 in (1.93 m) | 180 lb (82 kg) | Fr | Madison Central High School | Madison, MS |
| 39 | RHP | Jacob Steinberg (redshirt) | R/R | 6 ft 2 in (1.88 m) | 225 lb (102 kg) | Fr | St. John's College High School | Darnestown, MD |
| 40 | RHP | Houston Roth | R/R | 6 ft 3 in (1.91 m) | 220 lb (100 kg) | Jr | Oxford High School | Oxford, MS |
| 41 | LHP | Pierce Smith | L/L | 6 ft 5 in (1.96 m) | 220 lb (100 kg) | Sr | George Walton Comprehensive High School; Chattahoochee Valley Community College | Marietta, GA |
| 44 | OF | Carl Gindl | L/R | 5 ft 10 in (1.78 m) | 185 lb (84 kg) | So | Pensacola Catholic High School | Cantonment, FL |
| 58 | RHP | Ray Falk | R/R | 6 ft 3 in (1.91 m) | 220 lb (100 kg) | RS Jr | Terra Nova High School; Skyline College | Pacifica, CA |
| 65 | RHP | Parker Caracci | R/R | 6 ft 0 in (1.83 m) | 205 lb (93 kg) | RS Jr | Jackson Preparatory School | Jackson, MS |

Head coach

Mike Bianco (LSU)

Assistant coach(es)

Marc MacMillan (Ole Miss)

Hitting coach(es)

Mike Clement (Morningside)

Pitching coach(es)

Carl Lafferty (Ole Miss)

Legend

- (C) Team captain
- (S) Suspended
- (I) Ineligible
- Injured
- Current redshirt

Roster
Last update: April 8, 2019

== Schedule and results ==
2019 Ole Miss Rebels baseball game log
Regular season (37–25)

February (5–2)
| Date | Opponent | Rank | Site/stadium | Score | Win | Loss | Save | TV | Attendance | Overall record | SEC record |
|---|---|---|---|---|---|---|---|---|---|---|---|
| Feb. 15 | Wright State | No. 10 | Swayze Field; Oxford, MS | **W** 10–1 | **Will Ethridge (1–0)** | Bear Bellomy (0–1) | **Austin Miller (1)** | SECN+ | 8,832 | 1–0 | |
| Feb. 16 | Wright State | No. 10 | Swayze Field | **L** 5–9 | Zane Collins (1–0) | **Zack Phillips (0–1)** | Daniel Kreuzer (1) | SECN+ | 8,802 | 1–1 | |
| Feb. 17 | Wright State | No. 10 | Swayze Field | **Cancelled due to weather** | | | | | | | |
| Feb. 20 | Arkansas State | No. 10 | Swayze Field | **W** 15–3 | **Houston Roth (1–0)** | Carter Holt (0–1) | | SECN+ | 7,848 | 2–1 | |
| Feb. 22 | at Tulane | No. 10 | Turchin Stadium; New Orleans, LA | **W** 6–4 | **Austin Miller (1–0)** | Kaleb Roper (0–1) | **Parker Caracci (1)** | | 2,424 | 3–1 | |
| Feb. 23 | at Tulane | No. 10 | Turchin Stadium | **L** 12–13 | Connor Pellerin (1–0) | **Parker Caracci (0–1)** | | | 2,319 | 3–2 | |
| Feb. 24 | at Tulane | No. 10 | Turchin Stadium | **W** 6–3 | **Connor Green (1–0)** | Robert Price (0–1) | **Doug Nikhazy (1)** | | 2,515 | 4–2 | |
| Feb. 26 | UT Martin | No. 10 | Swayze Field | **W** 12–6 | **Connor Green (2–0)** | David Hussey (0–1) | | SECN+ | 8,414 | 5–2 | |

March (15–7)
| Date | Opponent | Rank | Site/stadium | Score | Win | Loss | Save | TV | Attendance | Overall record | SEC record |
|---|---|---|---|---|---|---|---|---|---|---|---|
| March 1 | Long Beach State | No. 10 | Swayze Field | **W** 7–2 | **Will Ethridge (2–0)** | Zak Baayoun (0–2) | **Austin Miller (2)** | SECN+ | 8,788 | 6–2 | |
| March 2 (1) | Long Beach State | No. 10 | Swayze Field | **W** 7–6 | **Doug Nikhazy (1–0)** | Dylan Spacke (0–1) | | SECN+ | 9,449 (DH) | 7–2 | |
| March 2 (2) | Long Beach State | No. 10 | Swayze Field | **W** 5–3 | **Taylor Broadway (1–0)** | Alfredo Ruiz (0–3) | | SECN+ | 9,449 (DH) | 8–2 | |
| March 5 | Little Rock | No. 10 | Swayze Field | **W** 11–8 | **Max Cioffi (1–0)** | Aaron Funk (0–1) | | SECN+ | 7,574 | 9–2 | |
| March 6 | No. 18 East Carolina | No. 10 | Swayze Field | **L** 2–3 | Jake Kuchmaner (1–0) | **Doug Nikhazy (1–1)** | Sam Lanier (2) | SECN+ | 7,701 | 9–3 | |
| March 8 | UAB | No. 10 | Swayze Field | **W** 15–9 | **Will Ethridge (3–0)** | Tanner Graham (2–1) | | SECN+ | 7,844 | 10–3 | |
| March 9 | UAB | No. 10 | Swayze Field | **W** 13–4 | **Zack Phillips (1–1)** | Tyler O’Clair (1–1) | | | 8,059 | 11–3 | |
| March 10 | UAB | No. 10 | Swayze Field | **W** 2–1 | **Connor Green (3–0)** | Graham Ashcraft (1–2) | **Parker Caracci (2)** | | 8,414 | 12–3 | |
| March 12 | at No. 7 Louisville | No. 9 | Jim Patterson Stadium; Louisville, KY | **L** 3–4^{10} | Michael McAvene (1–0) | **Connor Green (3–1)** | | ACCN Extra | 1,196 | 12–4 | |
| March 13 | at No. 7 Louisville | No. 9 | Jim Patterson Stadium | **L** 8–10 | Adam Elliott (1–1) | **Houston Roth (1–1)** | | ACCN Extra | 1,397 | 12–5 | |
| March 15 | Alabama | No. 9 | Swayze Field | **W** 1–0 | **Will Ethridge (4–0)** | Sam Finnerty (4–1) | **Parker Caracci (3)** | SECN+ | 8,507 | 13–5 | 1–0 |
| March 16 | Alabama | No. 9 | Swayze Field | **L** 6–8 | Deacon Medders (2–1) | **Doug Nikhazy (1–2)** | Jeremy Randolph (4) | SECN+ | 9,016 | 13–6 | 1–1 |
| March 17 | Alabama | No. 9 | Swayze Field | **W** 12–2 | **Gunnar Hoglund (1–0)** | Wil Freeman (2–1) | | SECN+ | 8,667 | 14–6 | 2–1 |
| March 19 | Arkansas–Pine Bluff | No. 18 | Swayze Field | **W** 12–2^{8} | **Jordan Fowler (1–0)** | Daniel Walsh (0–2) | | SECN+ | 8,987 | 15–6 | |
| March 20 | Arkansas–Pine Bluff | No. 18 | Swayze Field | **W** 25–0^{7} | **Zack Phillips (2–1)** | Antoine Luster (0–2) | | SECN+ | 8,409 | 16–6 | |
| March 22 | at Missouri | No. 18 | Taylor Stadium; Columbia, MO | **L** 1–2 | Jacob Cantleberry (3–1) | **Will Ethridge (4–1)** | Cameron Dulle (3) | SEC Network | 1,086 | 16–7 | 2–2 |
| March 23 | at Missouri | No. 18 | Taylor Stadium | **W** 3–0 | **Doug Nikhazy (2–2)** | T. J. Sikkema (2–2) | **Parker Caracci (4)** | SECN+ | 809 | 17–7 | 3–2 |
| March 24 | at Missouri | No. 18 | Taylor Stadium | **L** 5–8 | Ian Bedell (1–1) | **Connor Green (3–2)** | Jordan Gubelman (1) | SEC Network | 880 | 17–8 | 3–3 |
| March 26 | at Memphis | No. 24 | AutoZone Park; Memphis, TN | **W** 9–6 | **Tyler Myers (1–0)** | Drew Hall (1–1) | **Parker Caracci (5)** | | 1,674 | 18–8 | |
| March 29 | at No. 8 Arkansas | No. 24 | Baum–Walker Stadium; Fayetteville, AR | **L** 3–5 | Isaiah Campbell (6–0) | **Will Ethridge (4–2)** | Matt Cronin (7) | ESPNU | 10,251 | 18–9 | 3–4 |
| March 30 | at No. 8 Arkansas | No. 24 | Baum–Walker Stadium | **W** 4–3 | **Austin Miller (2–0)** | Kevin Kopps (1–1) | **Parker Caracci (6)** | SEC Network | 9,642 | 19–9 | 4–4 |
| March 31 | at No. 8 Arkansas | No. 24 | Baum–Walker Stadium | **W** 10–5 | **Zack Phillips (3–1)** | Kevin Kopps (1–2) | **Tyler Myers (1)** | SECN+ | 8,433 | 20–9 | 5–4 |

April (10–6)
| Date | Opponent | Rank | Site/stadium | Score | Win | Loss | Save | TV | Attendance | Overall record | SEC record |
|---|---|---|---|---|---|---|---|---|---|---|---|
| April 2 | North Alabama | No. 18 | Swayze Field | **L** 6–10 | Hunter Davidson (2–1) | **Max Cioffi (1–1)** | | SECN+ | 12,081 | 20–10 | |
| April 5 | No. 21 Florida | No. 18 | Swayze Field | **W** 12–4 | **Tyler Myers (2–0)** | Tommy Mace (5–3) | | SECN+ | 11,026 | 21–10 | 6–4 |
| April 6 (1) | No. 21 Florida | No. 18 | Swayze Field | **W** 16–4 | **Doug Nikhazy (3–2)** | Tyler Dyson (3–2) | | SECN+ | 10,220 (DH) | 22–10 | 7–4 |
| April 6 (2) | No. 21 Florida | No. 18 | Swayze Field | **W** 12–10 | **Parker Caracci (1–1)** | Nolan Crisp (2–1) | | SECN+ | 10,220 (DH) | 23–10 | 8–4 |
| April 9 | vs. Southern Miss | No. 11 | Trustmark Park; Pearl, MS | **W** 11–2 | **Austin Miller (3–0)** | Sean Tweedy (5–1) | | | 4,097 | 24–10 | |
| April 12 | Kentucky | No. 11 | Swayze Field | **W** 8–2 | **Will Ethridge (5–2)** | Jimmy Ramsey (2–3) | | SECN+ | 9,491 | 25–10 | 9–4 |
| April 14 (1) | Kentucky | No. 11 | Swayze Field | **L** 1–4^{7} | Mason Hazelwood (2–2) | **Doug Nikhazy (3–3)** | Carson Coleman (3) | SECN+ | 7,978 (DH) | 25–11 | 9–5 |
| April 14 (2) | Kentucky | No. 11 | Swayze Field | **L** 2–4^{7} | Zack Thompson (3–0) | **Gunnar Hoglund (1–1)** | Daniel Harper (1) | SECN+ | 7,978 (DH) | 25–12 | 9–6 |
| April 16 | Memphis | No. 15 | Swayze Field | **W** 5–2 | **Zack Phillips (4–1)** | Danny Denz (1–2) | **Parker Caracci (7)** | SECN+ | 8,695 | 26–12 | |
| April 18 | at Auburn | No. 15 | Plainsman Park; Auburn, AL | **L** 4–7 | Richard Fitts (3–2) | **Will Ethridge (5–3)** | Cody Greenhill (9) | SECN+ | 3,409 | 26–13 | 9–7 |
| April 19 | at Auburn | No. 15 | Plainsman Park | **W** 5–3 | **Doug Nikhazy (4–3)** | Tanner Burns (4–2) | **Parker Caracci (8)** | SECN+ | 3,100 | 27–13 | 10–7 |
| April 20 | at Auburn | No. 15 | Plainsman Park | **L** 5–6^{10} | Cody Greenhill (1–1) | **Parker Caracci (1–2)** | | SECN+ | 3,614 | 27–14 | 10–8 |
| April 23 | vs. No. 9 Mississippi State; Governor's Cup | No. 19 | Trustmark Park | **L** 1–8 | Trysten Barlow (3–1) | **Zack Phillips (4–2)** | | | 8,638 | 27–15 | |
| April 25 | No. 6 Texas A&M | No. 19 | Swayze Field | **W** 5–4^{11} | **Parker Caracci (2–2)** | Joseph Menefee (3–1) | | SEC Network | 7,889 | 28–15 | 11–8 |
| April 26 | No. 6 Texas A&M | No. 19 | Swayze Field | **W** 13–3 | **Doug Nikhazy (5–3)** | Asa Lacy (6–3) | | SECN+ | 9,884 | 29–15 | 12–8 |
| April 27 | No. 6 Texas A&M | No. 19 | Swayze Field | **W** 3–2 | **Parker Caracci (3–2)** | Kalich (1–1) | | SECN+ | 9,681 | 30–15 | 13–8 |

May (0–0)
| Date | Opponent | Rank | Site/stadium | Score | Win | Loss | Save | TV | Attendance | Overall record | SEC record |
|---|---|---|---|---|---|---|---|---|---|---|---|
| May 1 | at Southern Miss | No. 13 | Pete Taylor Park; Hattiesburg, MS | **L** 3–5 | J. C. Keys (2–1) | **Max Cioffi (1–2)** | | | 5,202 | 30–16 | |
| May 3 | at No. 12 LSU | No. 13 | Alex Box Stadium; Baton Rouge, LA | **L** 3–8 | Zack Hess (3–3) | **Will Ethridge (5–4)** | | SECN+ | 11,119 | 30–17 | 13–9 |
| May 4 | at No. 12 LSU | No. 13 | Alex Box Stadium | **W** 5–1 | **Doug Nikhazy (6–3)** | Eric Walker (4–4) | | SECN+ | 11,409 | 31–17 | 14–9 |
| May 5 | at No. 12 LSU | No. 13 | Alex Box Stadium | **W** 19–15^{10} | **Austin Miller (4–0)** | Devin Fontenot (4–1) | | ESPN2 | 10,671 | 32–17 | 15–9 |
| May 10 | No. 5 Mississippi State | No. 11 | Swayze Field | **L** 0–2 | Ethan Small (7–1) | **Will Ethridge (5–5)** | Jared Liebelt (5) | SECN+ | 8,797 | 32–18 | 15–10 |
| May 11 | No. 5 Mississippi State | No. 11 | Swayze Field | **L** 5–8 | Riley Self (2–0) | **Austin Miller (4–1)** | Cole Gordon (9) | SECN+ | 8,967 | 32–19 | 15–11 |
| May 12 | No. 5 Mississippi State | No. 11 | Swayze Field | **L** 5–11 | Peyton Plumlee (5–3) | **Gunnar Hoglund (1–2)** | | ESPN2 | 8,572 | 32–20 | 15–12 |
| May 14 | at Arkansas State | No. 15 | Tomlinson Stadium–Kell Field; Jonesboro, AR | **L** 5–6 | Noah Stone (2–1) | **Parker Caracci (3–3)** | | | 1,053 | 32–21 | |
| May 16 | at Tennessee | No. 15 | Lindsey Nelson Stadium; Knoxville, TN | **L** 0–7 | Garrett Stallings (8–3) | **Will Ethridge (5–6)** | | SEC Network | 2,310 | 32–22 | 15–13 |
| May 17 | at Tennessee | No. 15 | Lindsey Nelson Stadium | **L** 5–7 | Redmond Walsh (1–2) | **Austin Miller (4–2)** | | SECN+ | 2,866 | 32–23 | 15–14 |
| May 18 | at Tennessee | No. 15 | Lindsey Nelson Stadium | **W** 5–4 | **Gunnar Hoglund (2–2)** | Zach Linginfelter (6–5) | **Ryan Olenek (1)** | SEC Network | 2,718 | 33–23 | 16–14 |

Post-season (7–2)

SEC Tournament (4–2)
| Date | Opponent | Seed | Site/stadium | Score | Win | Loss | Save | TV | Attendance | Overall record | SECT record |
|---|---|---|---|---|---|---|---|---|---|---|---|
| May 21 | vs. (10) Missouri | (7) | Hoover Metropolitan Stadium; Hoover, AL | **W** 2–1 | **Will Ethridge (6–6)** | Cantleberry | **Ryan Olenek (2)** | SEC Network | 4,135 | 34–23 | 1–0 |
| May 22 | vs. (2) Arkansas | (7) | Hoover Metropolitan Stadium | **L** 3–5 | Kevin Kopps (6–3) | **Zack Phillips (4–3)** | Matt Cronin (11) | SEC Network | 5,264 | 34–24 | 1–1 |
| May 23 | vs. (6) Texas A&M | (7) | Hoover Metropolitan Stadium | **W** 1–0 | **Doug Nikhazy (7–3)** | Miller (4–2) | **Parker Caracci (9)** | SEC Network | ` | 35–24 | 2–1 |
| May 24 | vs. (2) Arkansas | (7) | Hoover Metropolitan Stadium | **W** 3–2 | **Austin Miller (5–2)** | Zebulon Vermillion (4–1) | **Parker Caracci (10)** | SEC Network | | 36–24 | 3–1 |
| May 25 | vs. (3) Georgia | (7) | Hoover Metropolitan Stadium | **W** 5–3 | **Max Cioffi (2–2)** | Tony Locey (10–2) | **Parker Caracci (11)** | SEC Network | | 37–24 | 4–1 |
| May 26 | vs. (1) Vanderbilt | (7) | Hoover Metropolitan Stadium | **L** 10–11 | Brown (3–1) | **Austin Miller (5–3)** | | ESPN2 | 10,487 | 37–25 | 4–2 |

NCAA Division I baseball tournament–Oxford Regional (3–0)
| Date | Opponent | Seed/National Seed | Site/stadium | Score | Win | Loss | Save | TV | Attendance | Overall record | NCAAT record |
|---|---|---|---|---|---|---|---|---|---|---|---|
| May 31 | (4) Jacksonville State | (1) No. 12 | Swayze Field | **W** 16–2 | **Will Ethridge (7–6)** | Garrett Farmer (5–2) | | ESPN3 | 9,810 | 38–25 | 1–0 |
| June 1 | (3) Clemson | (1) No. 12 | Swayze Field | **W** 6–1 | **Doug Nikhazy (8–3)** | Mat Clark (9–3) | | ESPNU | 10,037 | 39–25 | 2–0 |
| June 2 | (4) Jacksonville State | (1) No. 12 | Swayze Field | **W** 19–4 | **Gunnar Hoglund (3–2)** | Trey Fortner (2–6) | | ESPN3 | 9,505 | 40–25 | 3–0 |

NCAA Division I baseball tournament–Fayetteville Super Regional (0–0)
| Date | Opponent | National Seed | Site/stadium | Score | Win | Loss | Save | TV | Attendance | Overall record | NCAAT record |
|---|---|---|---|---|---|---|---|---|---|---|---|
| June 8 | at (5) Arkansas | (12) | Baum–Walker Stadium | **L** 2–11 | Isaiah Campbell (12–1) | **Will Ethridge (7–7)** | | ESPN | 11,350 | 40–26 | 3–1 |
| June 9 | at (5) Arkansas | (12) | Baum–Walker Stadium | **W** 13–5 | **Doug Nikhazy (9–3)** | Connor Noland (3–5) | **Houston Roth (1)** | ESPNU | 11,383 | 41–26 | 4–1 |
| June 10 | at (5) Arkansas | (12) | Baum–Walker Stadium | **L** 1–14 | Cody Scroggins (3–0) | **Gunnar Hoglund (3–3)** | | ESPN2 | 11,095 | 41–27 | 4–2 |

Legend: = Win = Loss = Cancelled
Bold = Ole Miss team member

Schedule source:

*Rankings are based on the team's current ranking in the D1Baseball poll.

== Oxford Regional ==
Oxford Regional Teams
| (1) Ole Miss Rebels | (2) Illinois Fighting Illini | (3) Clemson Tigers | (4) Jacksonville State Gamecocks |

First round
1 | Ole Miss | 16
4 | Jacksonville State | 2
3 | Clemson | 8
2 | Illinois | 4
Lower round 1
4 | Jacksonville State | 7
2 | Illinois | 5

Semi-finals
1 | Ole Miss | 6
3 | Clemson | 1
Lower final
4 | Jacksonville State | 9
3 | Clemson | 2

Finals
1 | Ole Miss
4 | Jacksonville State

Oxford Regional Round 1
| (4) Jacksonville State Gamecocks | vs. | (1) Ole Miss Rebels |

May 31, 2019, 7:41 pm (CDT) at Swayze Field in Oxford, Mississippi
| Team | 1 | 2 | 3 | 4 | 5 | 6 | 7 | 8 | 9 | R | H | E |
|---|---|---|---|---|---|---|---|---|---|---|---|---|
| (4) Jacksonville State | 1 | 0 | 0 | 0 | 0 | 0 | 1 | 0 | 0 | 2 | 3 | 2 |
| (1) Ole Miss | 2 | 0 | 2 | 1 | 5 | 0 | 5 | 1 | X | 16 | 15 | 0 |
WP: Will Ethridge (7–6) LP: Garrett Farmer (5–2); Home runs: JVST: None; MISS: Thomas Dillard (11); Tyler Keenan (14); Anthony Servideo (2); Attendance: 9,810

Oxford Regional Round 2
| (1) Ole Miss Rebels | vs. | (3) Clemson Tigers |

June 1, 2019, 6:07 pm (CDT) at Swayze Field in Oxford, Mississippi
| Team | 1 | 2 | 3 | 4 | 5 | 6 | 7 | 8 | 9 | R | H | E |
|---|---|---|---|---|---|---|---|---|---|---|---|---|
| (1) Ole Miss | 0 | 3 | 0 | 1 | 0 | 1 | 0 | 1 | 0 | 6 | 11 | 0 |
| (3) Clemson | 0 | 0 | 0 | 0 | 0 | 0 | 1 | 0 | 0 | 1 | 4 | 0 |
WP: Doug Nikhazy (8–3) LP: Mat Clark (9–3); Home runs: MISS: Cole Zabowski (11); Cooper Johnson (7); Kevin Graham (10); CLEM: None; Attendance: 10,037

Oxford Regional Championship
| (1) Ole Miss Rebels | vs. | (4) Jacksonville State Gamecocks |

June 2, 2019, 8:06 pm (CDT) at Swayze Field in Oxford, Mississippi
| Team | 1 | 2 | 3 | 4 | 5 | 6 | 7 | 8 | 9 | R | H | E |
|---|---|---|---|---|---|---|---|---|---|---|---|---|
| (1) Ole Miss | 1 | 0 | 5 | 6 | 0 | 5 | 1 | 1 | 0 | 19 | 20 | 0 |
| (4) Jacksonville State | 0 | 0 | 2 | 0 | 0 | 0 | 0 | 1 | 1 | 4 | 12 | 3 |
WP: Gunnar Hoglund (3–2) LP: Trey Fortner (2–6); Home runs: MISS: Thomas Dillard (12, 13); Anthony Servideo (3); JVST: None; Attendance: 9,505

== Fayetteville Super Regional ==
Fayetteville Super Regional Game 1
| (12) Ole Miss Rebels | vs. | (5) Arkansas Razorbacks |

June 8, 2019, 11:00 am (CDT) at Baum–Walker Stadium in Fayetteville, Arkansas
| Team | 1 | 2 | 3 | 4 | 5 | 6 | 7 | 8 | 9 | R | H | E |
|---|---|---|---|---|---|---|---|---|---|---|---|---|
| (12) Ole Miss | 1 | 0 | 0 | 0 | 0 | 0 | 0 | 0 | 1 | 2 | 5 | 1 |
| (5) Arkansas | 4 | 2 | 0 | 3 | 0 | 2 | 0 | 0 | X | 11 | 11 | 0 |
WP: Isaiah Campbell (12–1) LP: Will Ethridge (7–7); Home runs: MISS: Thomas Dillard (14); Grae Kessinger (6); ARK: Trevor Ezell (10); Matt Goodheart (5); Jack Kenley (13); Attendance: 11,350

Fayetteville Super Regional Game 2
| (5) Arkansas Razorbacks | vs. | (12) Ole Miss Rebels |

June 9, 2019, 2:00 pm (CDT) at Baum–Walker Stadium in Fayetteville, Arkansas
| Team | 1 | 2 | 3 | 4 | 5 | 6 | 7 | 8 | 9 | R | H | E |
|---|---|---|---|---|---|---|---|---|---|---|---|---|
| (5) Arkansas | 2 | 0 | 0 | 3 | 0 | 0 | 0 | 0 | 0 | 5 | 12 | 0 |
| (12) Ole Miss | 3 | 5 | 0 | 0 | 0 | 3 | 2 | 0 | X | 13 | 12 | 0 |
WP: Doug Nikhazy (9–3) LP: Connor Noland (3–5) Sv: Houston Roth (1); Home runs: ARK: Dominic Fletcher (11); MISS: Grae Kessinger (7); Tyler Keenan (15); Cole Zabowski (12); Cooper Johnson (8); Attendance: 11,383

Fayetteville Super Regional Game 3
| (12) Ole Miss Rebels | vs. | (5) Arkansas Razorbacks |

June 10, 2019, 3:00 pm (CDT) at Baum–Walker Stadium in Fayetteville, Arkansas
| Team | 1 | 2 | 3 | 4 | 5 | 6 | 7 | 8 | 9 | R | H | E |
|---|---|---|---|---|---|---|---|---|---|---|---|---|
| (12) Ole Miss | 1 | 0 | 0 | 0 | 0 | 0 | 0 | 0 | 0 | 1 | 7 | 0 |
| (5) Arkansas | 0 | 4 | 3 | 1 | 1 | 5 | 0 | 0 | X | 14 | 12 | 0 |
WP: Cody Scroggins (3–0) LP: Gunnar Hoglund (3–3); Home runs: MISS: None; ARK: Heston Kjerstad (16); Casey Opitz (3); Attendance: 11,095

== Awards and honors ==
=== Award watch lists ===
Award watch lists
| Player | Award | Date awarded | Ref. |
|---|---|---|---|
| Cooper Johnson | Buster Posey Award Watch List | April 3, 2019 | |
| Grae Kessinger | Brooks Wallace Award Finalist | May 30, 2019 | |

=== Regular season awards ===
Weekly Awards
| Player | Award | Date awarded | Ref. |
|---|---|---|---|
| Thomas Dillard | SEC Player of the Week | February 25, 2019 | |
| Thomas Dillard | Collegiate Baseball National Player of the Week | February 25, 2019 | |
| Thomas Dillard | Golden Spikes Award Performance of the Week | February 26, 2019 | |
| Thomas Dillard | NCBWA National Hitter of the Week | February 26, 2019 | |
| Ryan Olenek | Collegiate Baseball National Player of the Week | March 4, 2019 | |
| Doug Nikhazy | SEC Freshman of the Week | April 8, 2019 | |
| Doug Nikhazy | SEC Freshman of the Week | April 29, 2019 | |
| Cooper Johnson | SEC Player of the Week | May 6, 2019 | |

=== All-SEC Awards ===
All Conference Awards
| Player | Award | Date awarded | Ref. |
|---|---|---|---|
| Grae Kessinger | First-team All-SEC, SS | May 20, 2019 | |
| Cooper Johnson | Second-team All-SEC, C | May 20, 2019 | |
| Doug Nikhazy | Freshman All-SEC, SP | May 20, 2019 | |
| Cooper Johnson | SEC All-Defensive, C | May 20, 2019 | |

=== All-American Awards ===
All American Awards
| Player | Award | Date awarded | Ref. |
|---|---|---|---|
| Grae Kessinger | Collegiate Baseball Third Team All-American, SS | May 30, 2019 | |
| Doug Nikhazy | Collegiate Baseball Freshman All-American, SP | June 5, 2019 | |
| Kevin Graham | Collegiate Baseball Freshman All-American, DH | June 5, 2019 | |

== Record vs. conference opponents ==
Last two do not qualify for conf. tourn. Blank are not scheduled. Blue are home games, otherwise away.

2019 SEC baseball records Source: 2019 SEC baseball game results
| Team | W–L | ALA | ARK | AUB | FLA | UGA | KEN | LSU | MSU | MIZZ | MISS | SCAR | TENN | TAMU | VAN | Team | Div | SR | SW |
|---|---|---|---|---|---|---|---|---|---|---|---|---|---|---|---|---|---|---|---|
| ALA | 7–23 | | 1–2 | 1–2 | 0–3 | 0–3 | . | 1–2 | 0–3 | . | 1–2 | 2–1 | . | 1–2 | 0–3 | ALA | W7 | 1–9 | 0–4 |
| ARK | 20–10 | 2–1 | | 2–1 | . | . | 2–1 | 3–0 | 2–1 | 3–0 | 1–2 | . | 3–0 | 1–2 | 1–2 | ARK | W1 | 7–3 | 3–0 |
| AUB | 14–16 | 2–1 | 1–2 | | . | 1–2 | . | 1–2 | 1–2 | . | 2–1 | 2–1 | 3–0 | 1–2 | 0–3 | AUB | W6 | 4–6 | 1–1 |
| FLA | 13–17 | 3–0 | . | . | | 0–3 | 2–1 | 1–2 | 1–2 | 3–0 | 0–3 | 2–1 | 1–2 | . | 0–3 | FLA | E5 | 4–6 | 2–3 |
| UGA | 21–9 | 3–0 | . | 2–1 | 3–0 | | 2–1 | 2–1 | 0–3 | 3–0 | . | 3–0 | 1–2 | . | 2–1 | UGA | E2 | 8–2 | 4–1 |
| KEN | 7–23 | . | 1–2 | . | 1–2 | 1–2 | | 0–3 | . | 1–2 | 2–1 | 1–2 | 0–3 | 0–3 | 0–3 | KEN | E7 | 1–9 | 0–4 |
| LSU | 17–13 | 2–1 | 0–3 | 2–1 | 2–1 | 1–2 | 3–0 | | 3–0 | 1–2 | 1–2 | . | . | 2–1 | . | LSU | W3 | 6–4 | 2–1 |
| MSU | 20–10 | 3–0 | 1–2 | 2–1 | 2–1 | 3–0 | . | 0–3 | | . | 3–0 | 2–1 | 2–1 | 2–1 | . | MSU | W2 | 8–2 | 3–1 |
| MIZZ | 13–16 | . | 0–3 | . | 0–3 | 0–3 | 2–1 | 2–1 | . | | 2–1 | 3–0 | 2–1 | 1–1 | 1–2 | MIZZ | E4 | 5–4 | 1–3 |
| MISS | 16–14 | 2–1 | 2–1 | 1–2 | 3–0 | . | 1–2 | 2–1 | 0–3 | 1–2 | | . | 1–2 | 3–0 | . | MISS | W5 | 5–5 | 2–1 |
| SCAR | 8–22 | 1–2 | . | 1–2 | 1–2 | 0–3 | 2–1 | . | 1–2 | 0–3 | . | | 1–2 | 1–2 | 0–3 | SCAR | E6 | 1–9 | 0–3 |
| TENN | 14–16 | . | 0–3 | 0–3 | 2–1 | 2–1 | 3–0 | . | 1–2 | 1–2 | 2–1 | 2–1 | | . | 1–2 | TENN | E3 | 5–5 | 1–2 |
| TAMU | 16–13 | 2–1 | 2–1 | 2–1 | . | . | 3–0 | 1–2 | 1–2 | 1–1 | 0–3 | 2–1 | . | | 2–1 | TAMU | W4 | 6–3 | 1–1 |
| VAN | 23–7 | 3–0 | 2–1 | 3–0 | 3–0 | 1–2 | 3–0 | . | . | 2–1 | . | 3–0 | 2–1 | 1–2 | | VAN | E1 | 8–2 | 5–0 |
| Team | W–L | ALA | ARK | AUB | FLA | UGA | KEN | LSU | MSU | MIZZ | MISS | SCAR | TENN | TAMU | VAN | Team | Div | SR | SW |

Updated for entire regular season. Missouri at Texas A&M series had one tie game.

== 2019 MLB draft ==
| Player | Position | Round | Overall | MLB Team |
|---|---|---|---|---|
| Grae Kessinger | Shortstop | 2 | 68 | Houston Astros |
| Will Ethridge | Pitcher | 5 | 159 | Colorado Rockies |
| Thomas Dillard | Catcher | 5 | 163 | Milwaukee Brewers |
| Cooper Johnson | Catcher | 6 | 172 | Detroit Tigers |
| Parker Caracci | Pitcher | 21 | 627 | Toronto Blue Jays |
| Cole Zabowski | First baseman | 22 | 652 | Detroit Tigers |
| Zack Phillips | Pitcher | 27 | 799 | Kansas City Royals |
| Houston Roth | Pitcher | 29 | 858 | Baltimore Orioles |

== Rankings ==
Ranking movements Legend: ██ Increase in ranking ██ Decrease in ranking — = Not ranked
| | Week | | | | | | | | | | | | | | | | | |
| Poll | Pre | 1 | 2 | 3 | 4 | 5 | 6 | 7 | 8 | 9 | 10 | 11 | 12 | 13 | 14 | 15 | 16 | Final |
|---|---|---|---|---|---|---|---|---|---|---|---|---|---|---|---|---|---|---|
| Coaches' | 10 | 10* | | 13 | 8 | 20 | 22 | 18 | 15 | 17 | 19 | 15 | 14 | 16 | 23 | 18 | | |
| Baseball America | 13 | 13 | 13 | 12 | 12 | 18 | 22 | 20 | 15 | 18 | 23 | 18 | 11 | 17 | 21 | 12 | | |
| Collegiate Baseball^ | 11 | 13 | 17 | 18 | 19 | 28 | — | — | 16 | 17 | 22 | 17 | 13 | 18 | — | 29 | | |
| NCBWA† | 11 | 16 | 17 | 15 | 12 | 20 | 25 | 19 | 15 | 17 | 19 | 16 | 15 | 19 | 24 | 17 | | |
| D1Baseball | 10 | 10 | 10 | 10 | 9 | 18 | 24 | 18 | 11 | 15 | 19 | 13 | 11 | 15 | 22 | 14 | | |

^ Collegiate Baseball ranked 40 teams in their preseason poll, but only ranked 30 teams weekly during the season.
† NCBWA ranks 30 teams in their preseason poll, but only ranks 25 teams weekly during the season.
* A new poll was not released for this week, so for comparison purposes, the previous week's ranking is inserted in this week's slot.
