= 2019 Mississippi State Bulldogs baseball team =

Mississippi State University in the 2019 NCAA Division I baseball season

2019 Mississippi State Bulldogs baseball

SEC Western Division co-champion Starkville Regional champions Starkville Super Regional champions

2019 College World Series, 5th (tie)
- Conference: Southeastern Conference
- Western Division

Ranking
- Coaches: No. 4
- CB: No. 5
- Record: 52–15 (20–10 SEC)
- Head coach: Chris Lemonis (1st season)
- Assistant coaches: Scott Foxhall; Jake Gautreau
- Home stadium: Dudy Noble Field, Polk–DeMent Stadium

2019 Southeastern Conference baseball standings
	Conf.						Overall
Team	W		L		T	PCT	W		L		T	PCT
Eastern
No. 1 Vanderbilt ^{x}‍†‍‡‍^{y}	23	–	7	–	0	.767	58	–	12	–	0	.829
No. 18 Georgia ‍‍‍^{y}	21	–	9	–	0	.700	46	–	17	–	0	.730
Tennessee ‍‍‍^{y}	14	–	16	–	0	.467	40	–	21	–	0	.656
Missouri ‍‍‍	13	–	16	–	1	.450	34	–	22	–	1	.605
Florida ‍‍‍^{y}	13	–	17	–	0	.433	34	–	26	–	0	.567
South Carolina ‍‍‍	8	–	22	–	0	.267	28	–	28	–	0	.500
Kentucky ‍‍‍	7	–	23	–	0	.233	26	–	29	–	0	.473
Western
No. 5 Mississippi State ^{x}‍‍‍^{y}	20	–	10	–	0	.667	52	–	15	–	0	.776
No. 6 Arkansas ^{x}‍‍‍^{y}	20	–	10	–	0	.667	46	–	20	–	0	.697
No. 14 LSU ‍‍‍^{y}	17	–	13	–	0	.567	40	–	26	–	0	.606
No. 20 Texas A&M ‍‍‍^{y}	16	–	13	–	1	.550	39	–	23	–	1	.627
No. 12 Ole Miss ‍‍‍^{y}	16	–	14	–	0	.533	41	–	27	–	0	.603
No. 9 Auburn ‍‍‍^{y}	14	–	16	–	0	.467	38	–	28	–	0	.576
Alabama ‍‍‍	7	–	23	–	0	.233	30	–	26	–	0	.536
x – Division champion † – Conference champion ‡ – Tournament champion y – Invited to the NCAA tournament As of June 25, 2019; Rankings from D1Baseball

The 2019 Mississippi State Bulldogs baseball team represented Mississippi State University in the 2019 NCAA Division I baseball season. The Bulldogs played their home games at Dudy Noble Field.

== Preseason ==
=== Preseason All-American teams ===
1st Team

- Jake Mangum – Outfielder (Collegiate Baseball)
- Jake Mangum – Outfielder (NCBWA)

2nd Team

- JT Ginn – Utility Player (Baseball America)
- Jake Mangum – Outfielder (D1Baseball)

3rd Team

- Jake Mangum -"BAMF" Outfielder (Perfect Game)

=== SEC media poll ===
The SEC media poll was released on February 7, 2019 with the Bulldogs predicted to finish in sixth place in the Western Division.

Media poll (West)
Predicted finish	Team	Votes (1st place)
1	LSU	88 (10)
2	Ole Miss	65 (1)
3	Arkansas	59 (1)
4	Auburn	57 (1)
5	Texas A&M	48 (1)
6	Mississippi State	47
7	Alabama	21

=== Preseason All-SEC teams ===
1st Team

- Jake Mangum – Outfielder

2nd Team

- Tanner Allen – First Baseman

== Roster ==
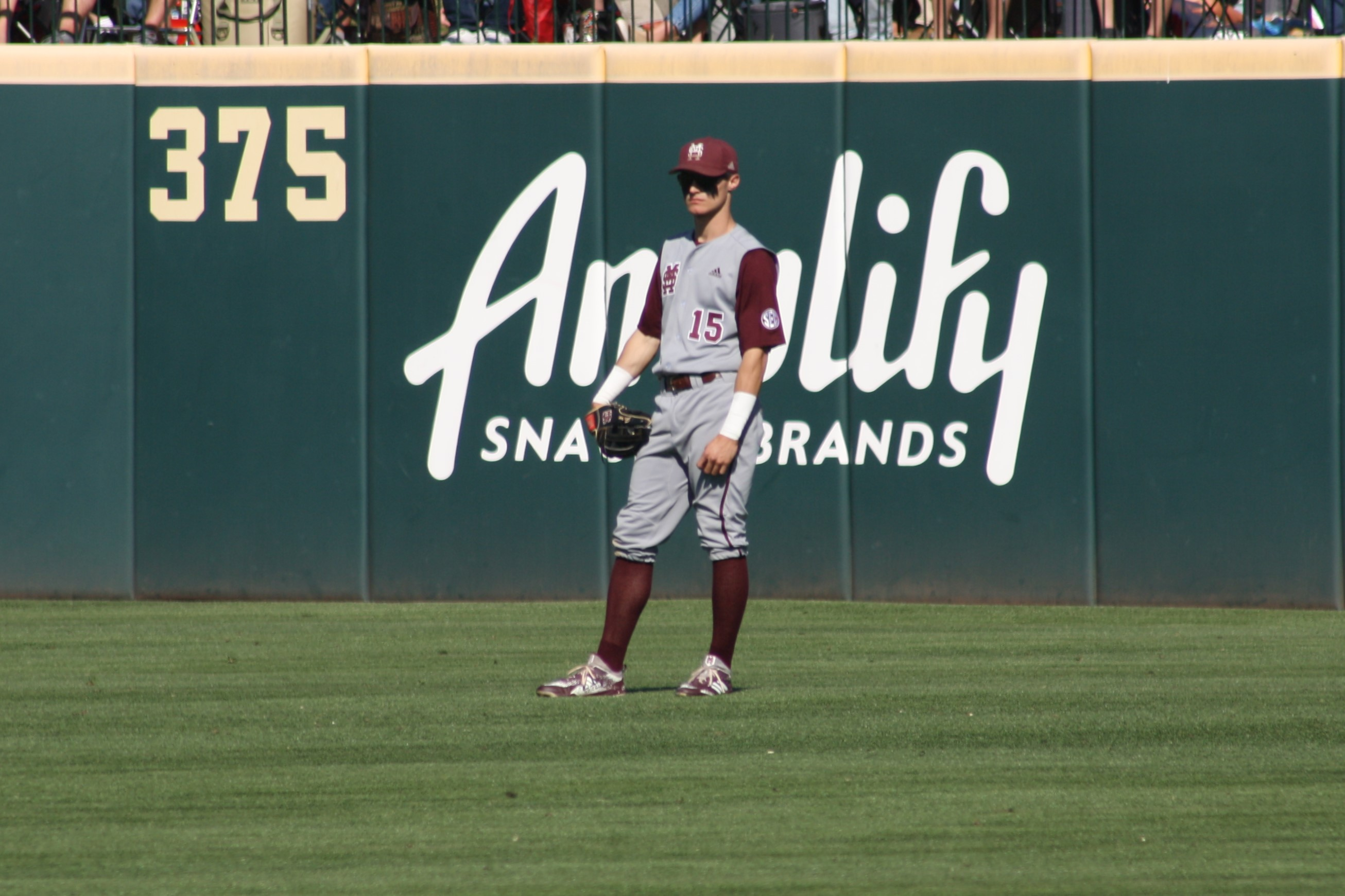
Jake Mangum plays centerfield for the Bulldogs

2019 Mississippi State Bulldogs baseball team
Players
Coaches

#	Pos.	Name	B/T	Height	Weight	Year	Home town
2	INF	Gunner Halter	R/R	6 ft 3 in (1.91 m)	180 lb (82 kg)	Jr	Overland Park, Kansas
3	INF	J. T. Ginn	R/R	6 ft 2 in (1.88 m)	192 lb (87 kg)	Fr	Brandon, Mississippi
4		Rowdey Jordan	S/R	5 ft 10 in (1.78 m)	171 lb (78 kg)	So	Auburn, Alabama
5		Tanner Allen	L/R	5 ft 11 in (1.8 m)	184 lb (83 kg)	So	Theodore, Alabama
6	INF	Brandon Smith	R/R	6 ft 3 in (1.91 m)	180 lb (82 kg)	Fr	Richland, Mississippi
8	C	Dustin Skelton	R/R	6 ft 0 in (1.83 m)	202 lb (92 kg)	Jr	Olive Branch, Mississippi
10		Josh Hatcher	L/L	6 ft 2 in (1.88 m)	175 lb (79 kg)	So	Albany, Georgia
11	INF	Jordan Westburg	R/R	6 ft 3 in (1.91 m)	191 lb (87 kg)	So	New Braunfels, Texas
12	C	Hayden Jones	L/R	6 ft 0 in (1.83 m)	185 lb (84 kg)	Fr	Huntertown, Indiana
13	RHP	Peyton Plumlee	R/R	6 ft 3 in (1.91 m)	201 lb (91 kg)	Sr	Olive Branch, Mississippi
14	RHP	Riley Self	R/R	6 ft 4 in (1.93 m)	241 lb (109 kg)	Jr	Coldwater, Mississippi
15	OF	Jake Mangum	S/L	6 ft 1 in (1.85 m)	179 lb (81 kg)	Sr	Pearl, Mississippi
16	LHP	Jack Eagan	L/L	6 ft 3 in (1.91 m)	235 lb (107 kg)	Jr	Wautoma, Wisconsin
17	INF	Justin Foscue	R/R	6 ft 0 in (1.83 m)	201 lb (91 kg)	So	Huntsville, Alabama
18	RHP	Keegan James	R/R	6 ft 2 in (1.88 m)	214 lb (97 kg)	RS Jr	Southaven, Mississippi
19	RHP	Jared Liebelt	R/R	6 ft 0 in (1.83 m)	169 lb (77 kg)	Sr	Aurora, Illinois
20	C	Luke Hancock	L/R	5 ft 11 in (1.8 m)	170 lb (77 kg)	Fr	Houston, Mississippi
23		Tucker Childers	L/R	6 ft 3 in (1.91 m)	235 lb (107 kg)	Jr	Ripley, Mississippi
24	RHP	Cole Gordon	L/R	6 ft 5 in (1.96 m)	244 lb (111 kg)	RS Sr	Tampa, Florida
27	INF	Bryce Brock	L/L	6 ft 0 in (1.83 m)	165 lb (75 kg)	Fr	Hernando, Mississippi
28	LHP	Christian MacLeod	L/L	6 ft 3 in (1.91 m)	215 lb (98 kg)	Fr	Huntsville, Alabama
31	OF	Benjamin Bell	L/R	5 ft 9 in (1.75 m)	180 lb (82 kg)	Fr	Madison, Mississippi
32	INF	Landon Jordan	L/R	6 ft 0 in (1.83 m)	180 lb (82 kg)	Fr	Poplarville, Mississippi
33	OF	Brad Cumbest	R/R	6 ft 5 in (1.96 m)	245 lb (111 kg)	Fr	Hurley, Mississippi
34	C	Marshall Gilbert	R/R	6 ft 0 in (1.83 m)	203 lb (92 kg)	Sr	Kenosha, Wisconsin
35	OF	Basiel Williams	S/R	6 ft 3 in (1.91 m)	180 lb (82 kg)	Fr	Hammond, Louisiana
36	OF	Hunter Blalock	R/R	6 ft 5 in (1.96 m)	195 lb (88 kg)	Fr	Madison, Mississippi
37	RHP	Eric Cerantola	R/R	6 ft 5 in (1.96 m)	195 lb (88 kg)	Fr	Oakville, Ontario
38	RHP	J. P. Elkins	R/R	6 ft 1 in (1.85 m)	190 lb (86 kg)	So	Ridgeland, Mississippi
39	RHP	Tyler Spring	R/R	6 ft 4 in (1.93 m)	202 lb (92 kg)	RS Jr	Wiggins, Mississippi
40	OF	Elijah MacNamee	R/R	6 ft 3 in (1.91 m)	198 lb (90 kg)	Sr	Cypress, Texas
41	RHP	Colby White	R/R	6 ft 0 in (1.83 m)	190 lb (86 kg)	Jr	Foxworth, Mississippi
43	LHP	Kale Breaux	R/L	5 ft 11 in (1.8 m)	193 lb (88 kg)	RS Jr	Sulphur, Louisiana
44	LHP	Ethan Small	L/L	6 ft 3 in (1.91 m)	214 lb (97 kg)	RS Jr	Lexington, Tennessee
46	LHP	Trysten Barlow	L/L	6 ft 1 in (1.85 m)	215 lb (98 kg)	RS Jr	Halls, Tennessee
55	RHP	Spencer Price	R/R	6 ft 2 in (1.88 m)	228 lb (103 kg)	RS Jr	Olive Branch, Mississippi

Head coach

Chris Lemonis

Assistant coach(es)

Hitting coach(es)

Jake Gautreau

Base coach(es)

Kyle Cheesebrough

Pitching coach(es)

Scott Foxhall

Legend

- (C) Team captain
- (S) Suspended
- (I) Ineligible
- Injured
- Current redshirt

Roster
Last update: June 10, 2019

== Schedule and results ==
2019 Mississippi State Bulldogs baseball game log
Regular season (45–11)

February (8–1)
Date	Opponent	Rank	Site/stadium	Score	Win	Loss	Save	TV	Attendance	Overall record	SEC record
Feb. 15	Youngstown State	No. 14	Dudy Noble Field • Starkville, MS	W 14–3	Cole Gordon (1–0)	Kip DeShields (0–1)	none	SECN+	8,503	1–0	–
Feb. 16	Youngstown State (DH-1)	No. 14	Dudy Noble Field • Starkville, MS	W 14–2	JT Ginn (1–0)	Chad Coles (0–1)	none	SECN+	9,157	2–0	–
Feb. 16	Youngstown State (DH-2)	No. 14	Dudy Noble Field • Starkville, MS	W 8–0	Keegan James (1–0)	Jon Synder (0–1)	none	SECN+	9,157	3–0	–
Feb. 17	Youngstown State	No. 14	Dudy Noble Field • Starkville, MS	Moved to 2/16, impending weather							
Feb. 20	UAB	No. 14	Dudy Noble Field • Starkville, MS	W 3–2	Riley Self (1–0)	Riley Davis (1–1)	Cole Gordon (1)	SECN+	6,539	4–0	–
Feb. 22	Southern Miss	No. 14	Dudy Noble Field • Starkville, MS	L 0–1^{10}	Ryan Och (1–0)	Trysten Barlow (0–1)	none	SECN+	7,091	4–1	–
Feb. 23	Southern Miss	No. 14	Dudy Noble Field • Starkville, MS	W 8–1	JT Ginn (2–0)	Steve Powers (1–1)	none	SECN+	9,376	5–1	–
Feb. 24	Southern Miss	No. 14	Dudy Noble Field • Starkville, MS	W 4–3	Cole Gordon (2–0)	Ryan Och (1–1)	none	SECN+	9,449	6–1	–
Feb. 26	Jackson State	No. 12	Dudy Noble Field • Starkville, MS	W 17–4	Eric Cerantola (1–0)	Mario Lopez (0–2)	none	SECN+	7,019	7–1	–
Feb. 27	Southeastern Louisiana	No. 12	Dudy Noble Field • Starkville, MS	W 12–0	Peyton Plumlee (1–0)	Trey Shaffer (0–1)	none	SECN+	7,860	8–1	–

March (16–4)
Date	Opponent	Rank	Site/stadium	Score	Win	Loss	Save	TV	Attendance	Overall record	SEC record
Mar. 1	vs. Sam Houston State; Frisco Classic	No. 12	Dr Pepper Ballpark • Frisco, TX	W 5–4	Trysten Barlow (1–1)	Riley Gossett (0–1)	Cole Gordon (2)		6,447	9–1	–
Mar. 2	vs. No. 3 Texas Tech; Frisco Classic	No. 12	Dr Pepper Ballpark • Frisco, TX	W 4–2	JT Ginn (3–0)	Caleb Kilian (0–2)	Cole Gordon (3)		7,527	10–1	–
Mar. 3	vs. Nebraska; Frisco Classic	No. 12	Dr Pepper Ballpark • Frisco, TX	Cancelled due to cold							
Mar. 5	No. 18 East Carolina	No. 7	Dudy Noble Field • Starkville, MS	W 4–1	Keegan James (2–0)	Gavin Williams (1–1)	Cole Gordon (4)	SECN+	7,013	11–1	–
Mar. 6	Arkansas Pine–Bluff	No. 7	Dudy Noble Field • Starkville, MS	W 14–1	Eric Cerantola (2–0)	Colton Bochtler (0–1)	none	SECN+	6,506	12–1	–
Mar. 8	Maine (DH-1)	No. 7	Dudy Noble Field • Starkville, MS	W 9–2	Ethan Small (1–0)	Nick Silva (0–2)	Jared Liebelt (1)	SECN+	7,238	13–1	–
Mar. 8	Maine (DH-2)	No. 7	Dudy Noble Field • Starkville, MS	W 5–1	JT Ginn (4–0)	Peter Kemble (0–3)	none	SECN+	7,238	14–1	–
Mar. 9	Maine	No. 8	Dudy Noble Field • Starkville, MS	Moved to 3/8, impending weather							
Mar. 10	Maine	No. 7	Dudy Noble Field • Starkville, MS	W 9–8	Colby White (1–0)	Jacob Small (0–1)	Cole Gordon (5)	SECN+	7,458	15–1	–
Mar. 13	Grambling	No. 6	Dudy Noble Field • Starkville, MS	W 18–1	Eric Cerantola (3–0)	Andy Escano (0–2)	none	SECN+	7,495	16–1	–
Mar. 15	at No. 5 Florida	No. 6	Alfred A. McKethan Stadium • Gainesville, FL	W 6–5	Ethan Small (2–0)	Tommy Mace (4–1)	none	SECN+	4,215	17–1	1–0
Mar. 16	at No. 5 Florida (DH-1)	No. 6	Alfred A. McKethan Stadium • Gainesville, FL	W 10–5	JT Ginn (5–0)	Jack Leftwich (4–1)	Jared Liebelt (2)	SECN	4,019	18–1	2–0
Mar. 16	at No. 5 Florida (DH-2)	No. 6	Alfred A. McKethan Stadium • Gainesville, FL	L 2–4	Tyler Dyson (3–0)	Keegan James (2–1)	Christian Scott (1)	SECN+	3,247	18–2	2–1
Mar. 17	at No. 5 Florida	No. 6	Alfred A. McKethan Stadium • Gainesville, FL	Moved to 3/16, impending weather							
Mar. 19	Little Rock	No. 2	Dudy Noble Field • Starkville, MS	W 15–4	Jack Eagan (1–0)	Ethan Daily (0–2)	none	SECN+	7,470	19–2	–
Mar. 20	at Samford	No. 2	Joe Lee Griffin Stadium • Birmingham, AL	W 6–4	Tyler Spring (1–0)	Jack Rude (0–2)	Cole Gordon (6)		2,284	20–2	–
Mar. 22	No. 12 Auburn	No. 2	Dudy Noble Field • Starkville, MS	L 5–6	Elliott Anderson (4–0)	Colby White (1–1)	Cody Greenhill (4)	SECN+	10,029	20–3	2–2
Mar. 23	No. 12 Auburn	No. 2	Dudy Noble Field • Starkville, MS	W 15–2	JT Ginn (6–0)	Carson Skipper (3–1)	none	SECN+	12,343	21–3	3–2
Mar. 24	No. 12 Auburn	No. 2	Dudy Noble Field • Starkville, MS	W 20–15	Cole Gordon (3–0)	Cody Greenhill (0–1)	none	SECN+	9,886	22–3	4–2
Mar. 26	Mississippi Valley State	No. 2	Dudy Noble Field • Starkville, MS	W 18–5	Jared Liebelt (1–0)	Morgan Lomax (0–1)	none	SECN+	7,198	23–3	–
Mar. 28	No. 17 LSU	No. 2	Dudy Noble Field • Starkville, MS	W 6–5	Ethan Small (3–0)	Zack Hess (2–2)	Cole Gordon (7)	ESPNU	9,797	24–3	5–2
Mar. 29	No. 17 LSU	No. 2	Dudy Noble Field • Starkville, MS	L 5–10	Cole Henry (2–1)	JT Ginn (6–1)	none	SECN	11,262	24–4	5–3
Mar. 30	No. 17 LSU	No. 2	Dudy Noble Field • Starkville, MS	L 2–11	Eric Walker (2–1)	Peyton Plumlee (1–1)	none	SECN+	11,648	24–5	5–4

April (12–4)
Date	Opponent	Rank	Site/stadium	Score	Win	Loss	Save	TV	Attendance	Overall record	SEC record
April 3	Louisiana–Monroe	No. 8	Dudy Noble Field • Starkville, MS	W 21–8	Brandon Smith (1–0)	Cole Martin (0–3)	none	SECN+	7,532	25–5	–
April 5	at Tennessee	No. 8	Lindsey Nelson Stadium • Knoxville, TN	W 6–3^{11}	Trysten Barlow (2–1)	Garrett Crochet (3–2)	none	SECN+	2,684	26–5	6–4
April 6	at Tennessee	No. 8	Lindsey Nelson Stadium • Knoxville, TN	L 1–2	Zach Linginfelter (5–3)	Peyton Plumlee (1–2)	Redmond Walsh (4)	SECN+	2,485	26–6	6–5
April 7	at Tennessee	No. 8	Lindsey Nelson Stadium • Knoxville, TN	W 7–5	Keegan James (3–1)	Will Heflin (3–1)	Jared Liebelt (3)	SECN+	2,416	27–6	7–5
April 10	South Alabama	No. 6	Dudy Noble Field • Starkville, MS	W 7–5	Brandon Smith (2–0)	Patrick McBride (0–2)	Cole Gordon (8)	SECN+	7,270	28–6	–
April 12	Alabama; Super Bulldog Weekend	No. 6	Dudy Noble Field • Starkville, MS	W 6–0	Ethan Small (4–0)	Sam Finnerty (5–4)	none	SECN+	10,386	29–6	8–5
April 13	Alabama; Super Bulldog Weekend	No. 6	Dudy Noble Field • Starkville, MS	W 9–1	Peyton Plumlee (2–2)	Brock Love (4–2)	none	SECN+	11,112	30–6	9–5
April 14	Alabama; Super Bulldog Weekend	No. 6	Dudy Noble Field • Starkville, MS	W 13–3	JT Ginn (7–1)	Casey Cobb (0–1)	none	SECN	8,593	31–6	10–5
April 16	Texas Southern	No. 3	Dudy Noble Field • Starkville, MS	W 5–1	Colby White (2–1)	Alex Olguin (2–2)	none	SECN+	7,402	32–6	–
April 18	at No. 12 Arkansas	No. 3	Baum–Walker Stadium • Fayetteville, AR	L 3–5	Isaiah Campbell (7–1)	Ethan Small (4–1)	Matt Cronin (8)	ESPNU	8,338	32–7	10–6
April 19	at No. 12 Arkansas	No. 3	Baum–Walker Stadium • Fayetteville, AR	L 5–12	Kevin Kopps (3–3)	Peyton Plumlee (2–3)	none	SECN+	9,573	32–8	10–7
April 20	at No. 12 Arkansas	No. 3	Baum–Walker Stadium • Fayetteville, AR	L 2–10	Connor Noland (2–2)	JT Ginn (7–2)	none	SECN+	11,087	32–9	10–8
April 23†	vs. No. 19 Ole Miss; Governor's Cup	No. 9	Trustmark Park • Pearl, MS	W 8–1	Trysten Barlow (3–1)	Zack Phillips (4–2)	none		8,638	33–9	–
April 26	No. 4 Georgia	No. 9	Dudy Noble Field • Starkville, MS	W 19–3	Ethan Small (5–1)	C.J. Smith (3–3)	none	SECN+	9,061	34–9	11–8
April 27	No. 4 Georgia	No. 9	Dudy Noble Field • Starkville, MS	W 9–3	JT Ginn (8–2)	Tony Locey (7–1)	none	SECN	9,572	35–9	12–8
April 28	No. 4 Georgia	No. 9	Dudy Noble Field • Starkville, MS	W 6–5	Peyton Plumlee (3–3)	Tim Elliott (5–3)	none	SECN+	8,204	36–9	13–8

May (9–2)
Date	Opponent	Rank	Site/stadium	Score	Win	Loss	Save	TV	Attendance	Overall record	SEC record
May 2	at No. 14 Texas A&M	No. 6	Olsen Field at Blue Bell Park • College Station, TX	Postponed to 5/4, inclement weather							
May 3	at No. 14 Texas A&M	No. 6	Olsen Field at Blue Bell Park • College Station, TX	W 4–0	Ethan Small (6–1)	John Doxakis (5–3)	none	SECN+	4,734	37–9	14–8
May 4	at No. 14 Texas A&M (DH-1)	No. 6	Olsen Field at Blue Bell Park • College Station, TX	L 0–1^{7}	Asa Lacy (7–3)	JT Ginn (8–3)	none	SECN	7,275	37–10	14–9
May 4	at No. 14 Texas A&M (DH-2)	No. 6	Olsen Field at Blue Bell Park • College Station, TX	W 4–3^{7}	Peyton Plumlee (4–3)	Christian Roa (2–2)	Jared Liebelt (4)	SECN+	7,275	38–10	15–9
May 8	Memphis	No. 5	Dudy Noble Field • Starkville, MS	W 10–9	Cole Gordon (4–0)	Joshua Scheer (2–2)	none	SECN+	8,061	39–10	–
May 10	at No. 11 Ole Miss	No. 5	Swayze Field • Oxford, MS	W 2–0	Ethan Small (7–1)	Will Ethridge (5–5)	Jared Liebelt (5)	SECN+	8,797	40–10	16–9
May 11	at No. 11 Ole Miss	No. 5	Swayze Field • Oxford, MS	W 8–5	Riley Self (2–0)	Austin Miller (4–1)	Cole Gordon (9)	SECN+	8,967	41–10	17–9
May 12	at No. 11 Ole Miss	No. 5	Swayze Field • Oxford, MS	W 11–5	Peyton Plumlee (5–3)	Gunnar Hoglund (1–2)	none	ESPN2	8,572	42–10	18–9
May 14	Louisiana Tech	No. 5	Dudy Noble Field • Starkville, MS	W 7–3	Brandon Smith (3–0)	Logan Robbins (4–4)	none	SECN+	7,989	43–10	–
May 16	South Carolina	No. 5	Dudy Noble Field • Starkville, MS	W 24–7	Ethan Small (8–1)	Cam Tringali (2–4)	none	SECN+	8,094	44–10	19–9
May 17	South Carolina	No. 5	Dudy Noble Field • Starkville, MS	W 11–2	Colby White (3–1)	Reid Morgan (4–6)	none	SECN+	9,235	45–10	20–9
May 18	South Carolina	No. 5	Dudy Noble Field • Starkville, MS	L 8–10	Brett Kerry (4–1)	Peyton Plumlee (5–4)	Parker Coyne (1)	SECN+	10,461	45–11	20–10

Postseason (7–4)

SEC Tournament (1–2)
Date	Opponent	Seed/Rank	Site/stadium	Score	Win	Loss	Save	TV	Attendance	Overall record	SECT Record
May 22	vs. (5) No. 16 LSU	(4) No. 3	Hoover Metropolitan Stadium • Hoover, AL	W 6–5^{17}	Keegan James (4–1)	Ma'Khail Hilliard (0–4)	none	SECN	13,902	46–11	1–0
May 23	vs. (1) No. 2 Vanderbilt	(4) No. 3	Hoover Metropolitan Stadium • Hoover, AL	L 0–1	Drake Fellows (11–0)	Ethan Small (8–2)	Tyler Brown (14)	SECN	8,620	46–12	1–1
May 24	vs. (5) No. 16 LSU	(4) No. 3	Hoover Metropolitan Stadium • Hoover, AL	L 2–12^{7}	Aaron George (3–1)	JT Ginn (8–4)	none	SECN	14,294	46–13	1–2

NCAA Starkville Regional (3–0)
Date	Opponent	Seed/Rank	Site/stadium	Score	Win	Loss	Save	TV	Attendance	Overall record	NCAAT record
May 31	(4) Southern	(1) No. 3	Dudy Noble Field • Starkville, MS	W 11–6	Jared Liebelt (2–0)	Connor Whalen (5–1)	Cole Gordon (10)	SECN	8,826	47–13	1–0
June 1	(3) Central Michigan	(1) No. 3	Dudy Noble Field • Starkville, MS	W 7–2	Ethan Small (9–2)	Cameron Brown (10–1)	none	ESPN3	11,511	48–13	2–0
June 2	(2) No. 17 Miami (FL)	(1) No. 3	Dudy Noble Field • Starkville, MS	W 5–2	Peyton Plumlee (6–4)	Slade Cecconi (5–4)	Cole Gordon (11)	SECN	9,014	49–13	3–0

NCAA Starkville Super Regional (2–0)
Date	Opponent	Seed/Rank	Site/stadium	Score	Win	Loss	Save	TV	Attendance	Overall record	NCAAT record
June 8	(11) No. 4 Stanford	(6) No. 3	Dudy Noble Field • Starkville, MS	W 6–2	Ethan Small (10–2)	Brendan Beck (5–4)	none	ESPNews	13,132	50–13	4–0
June 9	(11) No. 4 Stanford	(6) No. 3	Dudy Noble Field • Starkville, MS	W 8–1	Peyton Plumlee (7–4)	Erik Miller (8–3)	none	ESPNU	11,597	51–13	5–0

College World Series (1–2)
Date	Opponent	Seed/Rank	Site/stadium	Score	Win	Loss	Save	TV	Attendance	Overall record	CWS record
June 16	vs. Auburn	(6) No. 3	TD Ameritrade Park • Omaha, NE	W 5–4	Cole Gordon (5–0)	Tanner Burns (4–4)	none	ESPN2	22,671	52–13	1–0
June 18	vs. (2) No. 2 Vanderbilt	(6) No. 3	TD Ameritrade Park • Omaha, NE	Postponed to 6/19, inclement weather							
June 19	vs. (2) No. 2 Vanderbilt	(6) No. 3	TD Ameritrade Park • Omaha, NE	L 3–6	Kumar Rocker (11–5)	Peyton Plumlee (7–5)	Tyler Brown (16)	ESPN	15,465	52–14	1–1
June 20	vs. (7) No. 11 Louisville	(6) No. 3	TD Ameritrade Park • Omaha, NE	L 3–4	Reid Detmers (13–4)	Cole Gordon (5–1)	none	ESPN2	24,201	52–15	1–2

† Indicates the game does not count toward the 2019 Southeastern Conference standings.
*Rankings are based on the team's current ranking in the Collegiate Baseball poll.

== Starkville Regional ==
Starkville Regional Teams
(1) Mississippi State Bulldogs	(2) Miami Hurricanes	(3) Central Michigan Chippewas	(4) Southern Jaguars

First Round
1	Mississippi State	11
4	Southern	6
3	Central Michigan	6
2	Miami (FL)	5
Lower round 1
4	Southern	2
2	Miami (FL)	12

Semi-Finals
1	Mississippi State	7
3	Central Michigan	2
Lower final
2	Miami (FL)	18
3	Central Michigan	3

Finals
1	Mississippi State
2	Miami (FL)

Starkville Regional Game 1
(4) Southern Jaguars	vs.	(1) Mississippi State Bulldogs

May 31, 2019, 12:00 pm (CDT) at Dudy Noble Field in Starkville, Mississippi
Team	1	2	3	4	5	6	7	8	9	R	H	E
(4) Southern	0	0	1	3	0	0	2	0	0	6	11	2
(1) Mississippi State	1	0	1	0	4	0	3	2	-	11	12	1
WP: Jared Liebelt (2–0) LP: Connor Whalen (5–1) Sv: Cole Gordon (10); Home runs: SOU: Johnny Johnson; MSST: Rowdey Jordan; Attendance: 8,826

Starkville Regional Game 2
(1) Mississippi State Bulldogs	vs.	(3) Central Michigan Chippewas

June 1, 2019, 6:00 pm (CDT) at Dudy Noble Field in Starkville, Mississippi
Team	1	2	3	4	5	6	7	8	9	R	H	E
(1) Mississippi State	4	0	2	0	0	0	0	0	1	7	16	0
(3) Central Michigan	0	0	0	0	0	2	0	0	0	2	6	2
WP: Ethan Small (9–2) LP: Cameron Brown (10–1); Home runs: MSST: Tanner Allen; CMU: Jason Sullivan; Attendance: 11,511

Starkville Regional Championship
(1) Mississippi State Bulldogs	vs.	(2) Miami Hurricanes

June 2, 2019, 8:00 pm (CDT) at Dudy Noble Field in Starkville, Mississippi
Team	1	2	3	4	5	6	7	8	9	R	H	E
(1) Mississippi State	0	0	0	3	0	0	0	2	0	5	8	1
(2) Miami	0	1	0	0	0	1	0	0	0	2	8	1
WP: Peyton Plumlee (6–4) LP: Slade Cecconi (5–4) Sv: Cole Gordon (11); Home runs: MSST: None; MIA: Raymond Gil; Attendance: 9,014

== Starkville Super Regional ==
Starkville Super Regional Game 1
(11) Stanford Cardinal	vs.	(6) Mississippi State Bulldogs

June 8, 2019, 7:00 pm (CDT) at Dudy Noble Field in Starkville, Mississippi
Team	1	2	3	4	5	6	7	8	9	R	H	E
(11) Stanford	1	0	0	0	0	0	0	1	0	2	9	3
(6) Mississippi State	0	1	2	3	0	0	0	0	X	6	12	1
WP: Ethan Small (10-2) LP: Brendan Beck (5-4); Attendance: 13,132

June 9, 2019, 8:00 pm (CDT) at Dudy Noble Field in Starkville, Mississippi
Team	1	2	3	4	5	6	7	8	9	R	H	E
(6) Mississippi State	0	0	4	1	0	0	0	0	3	8	11	2
(11) Stanford	1	0	0	0	0	0	0	0	0	1	4	0
WP: Peyton Plumlee (7-4) LP: Erik Miller (8-3); Home runs: STAN: Tim Tawa; MSST: Elijah MacNamee; Attendance: 11,597

== Record vs. conference opponents ==
Last two do not qualify for conf. tourn. Blank are not scheduled. Blue are home games, otherwise away.

2019 SEC baseball records Source: 2019 SEC baseball game results
Team	W–L	ALA	ARK	AUB	FLA	UGA	KEN	LSU	MSU	MIZZ	MISS	SCAR	TENN	TAMU	VAN	Team	Div	SR	SW
ALA	7–23		1–2	1–2	0–3	0–3	.	1–2	0–3	.	1–2	2–1	.	1–2	0–3	ALA	W7	1–9	0–4
ARK	20–10	2–1		2–1	.	.	2–1	3–0	2–1	3–0	1–2	.	3–0	1–2	1–2	ARK	W1	7–3	3–0
AUB	14–16	2–1	1–2		.	1–2	.	1–2	1–2	.	2–1	2–1	3–0	1–2	0–3	AUB	W6	4–6	1–1
FLA	13–17	3–0	.	.		0–3	2–1	1–2	1–2	3–0	0–3	2–1	1–2	.	0–3	FLA	E5	4–6	2–3
UGA	21–9	3–0	.	2–1	3–0		2–1	2–1	0–3	3–0	.	3–0	1–2	.	2–1	UGA	E2	8–2	4–1
KEN	7–23	.	1–2	.	1–2	1–2		0–3	.	1–2	2–1	1–2	0–3	0–3	0–3	KEN	E7	1–9	0–4
LSU	17–13	2–1	0–3	2–1	2–1	1–2	3–0		3–0	1–2	1–2	.	.	2–1	.	LSU	W3	6–4	2–1
MSU	20–10	3–0	1–2	2–1	2–1	3–0	.	0–3		.	3–0	2–1	2–1	2–1	.	MSU	W2	8–2	3–1
MIZZ	13–16	.	0–3	.	0–3	0–3	2–1	2–1	.		2–1	3–0	2–1	1–1	1–2	MIZZ	E4	5–4	1–3
MISS	16–14	2–1	2–1	1–2	3–0	.	1–2	2–1	0–3	1–2		.	1–2	3–0	.	MISS	W5	5–5	2–1
SCAR	8–22	1–2	.	1–2	1–2	0–3	2–1	.	1–2	0–3	.		1–2	1–2	0–3	SCAR	E6	1–9	0–3
TENN	14–16	.	0–3	0–3	2–1	2–1	3–0	.	1–2	1–2	2–1	2–1		.	1–2	TENN	E3	5–5	1–2
TAMU	16–13	2–1	2–1	2–1	.	.	3–0	1–2	1–2	1–1	0–3	2–1	.		2–1	TAMU	W4	6–3	1–1
VAN	23–7	3–0	2–1	3–0	3–0	1–2	3–0	.	.	2–1	.	3–0	2–1	1–2		VAN	E1	8–2	5–0
Team	W–L	ALA	ARK	AUB	FLA	UGA	KEN	LSU	MSU	MIZZ	MISS	SCAR	TENN	TAMU	VAN	Team	Div	SR	SW

Updated for entire regular season. Missouri at Texas A&M series had one tie game.

== Rankings ==
Ranking movements Legend: ██ Increase in ranking ██ Decrease in ranking ( ) = First-place votes
	Week																		
Poll	Pre	1	2	3	4	5	6	7	8	9	10	11	12	13	14	15	16	17	Final
Coaches'	15	15*		8	5	4 (4)	2 (2)	8	6	2 (1)	8	7	6	5	3	4	4*	4*	4
Baseball America	9	9	9	8	7	2	2	5	5	3	9	6	5	5	5	5	5*	5*	5
Collegiate Baseball^	27	25	16	8	5	2	4	10	10	3	9	7	6	5	6	5	5	3	5
NCBWA†	13	12	11	7	5	2	3	9	5	3	10	7	6	4	4	5	5*	5*	5
D1Baseball	14	14	12	7	6	2	2	8	6	3	9	6	5	5	3	3	3*	3*	

^ Collegiate Baseball ranked 40 teams in their preseason poll, but only ranked 30 teams weekly during the season.
† NCBWA ranks 30 teams in their preseason poll, but only ranks 25 teams weekly during the season.
* A new poll was not released for this week, so for comparison purposes, the previous week's ranking is inserted in this week's slot.

== MLB draft ==
Player	Position	Round	Overall	MLB team
Ethan Small†	LHP	1	28	Milwaukee Brewers
Jake Mangum‡	OF	4	118	New York Mets
Colby White	RHP	6	188	Tampa Bay Rays
Trysten Barlow	LHP	16	489	Colorado Rockies
Dustin Skelton	C	18	531	Miami Marlins
Jared Liebelt	RHP	20	602	Arizona Diamondbacks
Keegan James	RHP	25	759	Colorado Rockies
Marshall Gilbert	C	29	874	Pittsburgh Pirates
Peyton Plumlee	RHP	31	946	Houston Astros
Cole Gordon	RHP	32	958	NY Mets
Tanner Allen§	1B	34	1029	Colorado Rockies

†Small, a redshirt junior, had previously been drafted in the 26th round in 2018.
‡Mangum, a senior, had previously been drafted in the 32nd round in 2018.
§Allen, a sophomore, will return to play for Mississippi State in 2020.
