= 2019 Florida Gators baseball team =

American college baseball season

2019 Florida Gators baseball

Lubbock Regional, 1–2
- Conference: Southeastern Conference
- Record: 34–26 (13–17 SEC)
- Head coach: Kevin O'Sullivan (12th year)
- Assistant coach: Craig Bell (12th year); Brad Weitzel (12th year)
- Home stadium: Alfred A. McKethan Stadium

2019 Southeastern Conference baseball standings
	Conf.						Overall
Team	W		L		T	PCT	W		L		T	PCT
Eastern
No. 1 Vanderbilt ^{x}‍†‍‡‍^{y}	23	–	7	–	0	.767	58	–	12	–	0	.829
No. 18 Georgia ‍‍‍^{y}	21	–	9	–	0	.700	46	–	17	–	0	.730
Tennessee ‍‍‍^{y}	14	–	16	–	0	.467	40	–	21	–	0	.656
Missouri ‍‍‍	13	–	16	–	1	.450	34	–	22	–	1	.605
Florida ‍‍‍^{y}	13	–	17	–	0	.433	34	–	26	–	0	.567
South Carolina ‍‍‍	8	–	22	–	0	.267	28	–	28	–	0	.500
Kentucky ‍‍‍	7	–	23	–	0	.233	26	–	29	–	0	.473
Western
No. 5 Mississippi State ^{x}‍‍‍^{y}	20	–	10	–	0	.667	52	–	15	–	0	.776
No. 6 Arkansas ^{x}‍‍‍^{y}	20	–	10	–	0	.667	46	–	20	–	0	.697
No. 14 LSU ‍‍‍^{y}	17	–	13	–	0	.567	40	–	26	–	0	.606
No. 20 Texas A&M ‍‍‍^{y}	16	–	13	–	1	.550	39	–	23	–	1	.627
No. 12 Ole Miss ‍‍‍^{y}	16	–	14	–	0	.533	41	–	27	–	0	.603
No. 9 Auburn ‍‍‍^{y}	14	–	16	–	0	.467	38	–	28	–	0	.576
Alabama ‍‍‍	7	–	23	–	0	.233	30	–	26	–	0	.536
x – Division champion † – Conference champion ‡ – Tournament champion y – Invited to the NCAA tournament As of June 25, 2019; Rankings from D1Baseball

The 2019 Florida Gators baseball team represented the University of Florida in the sport of baseball during the 2019 college baseball season. Florida competed in the Eastern Division of the Southeastern Conference (SEC). Home games were played at Alfred A. McKethan Stadium on the university's Gainesville, Florida campus. The team was coached by Kevin O'Sullivan in his twelfth season as Florida's head coach. The Gators entered the season as the defending conference champions, reaching the national semifinals in the 2018 College World Series before being eliminated by Arkansas.

== Preseason ==
=== Preseason All-American teams ===
1st Team

- Tyler Dyson – Starting Pitcher (Baseball America)

2nd Team

- Wil Dalton – Outfielder (NCBWA)

3rd Team

- Wil Dalton – Outfielder (Perfect Game)
- Wil Dalton – Outfielder (Collegiate Baseball)
- Wil Dalton – Outfielder (Baseball America)

=== SEC media poll ===
The SEC media poll was released on February 7, 2019 with the Gators predicted to finish in second place in the Eastern Division.

Media poll (East)
Predicted finish	Team	Votes (1st place)
1	Vanderbilt	87 (9)
2	Florida	81 (4)
3	Georgia	68 (1)
4	South Carolina	53
5	Tennessee	40
6	Kentucky	30
7	Missouri	26

=== Preseason All-SEC teams ===
2nd Team

- Tyler Dyson – Starting Pitcher

== Roster ==
=== By player ===
2019 Florida Gators baseball team
Players
Coaches

#	Pos.	Name	B/T	Height	Weight	Year	Home town
22	INF	Cory Acton	L/R	6 ft 0 in (1.83 m)	170 lb (77 kg)	Fr	Fort Lauderdale, FL
32	RHP	Justin Alintoff	R/R	6 ft 2 in (1.88 m)	220 lb (100 kg)	So	Jupiter, FL
34	INF	Kris Armstrong	S/R	6 ft 4 in (1.93 m)	215 lb (98 kg)	Fr	Jupiter, FL
21	RHP	Nick Blasucci	R/R	6 ft 2 in (1.88 m)	195 lb (88 kg)	Jr	Fort Myers, FL
15	LHP	Jordan Butler	L/L	6 ft 0 in (1.83 m)	185 lb (84 kg)	So	Tampa, FL
6	OF	Kendrick Calilao	R/R	6 ft 1 in (1.85 m)	205 lb (93 kg)	Fr	Kissimmee, FL
37	RHP	Nolan Crisp	R/R	5 ft 9 in (1.75 m)	175 lb (79 kg)	Fr	Locust Grove, GA
16	OF	Wil Dalton	R/R	6 ft 0 in (1.83 m)	190 lb (86 kg)	Jr	Spring Hill, TN
18	RHP	Tyler Dyson	R/R	6 ft 3 in (1.91 m)	225 lb (102 kg)	Jr	Bradenton, FL
4	OF	Jud Fabian	R/L	6 ft 1 in (1.85 m)	195 lb (88 kg)	Fr	Ocala, FL
8	INF	Christian Flint	R/R	5 ft 11 in (1.8 m)	170 lb (77 kg)	Jr	Delray Beach, FL
30	RHP	Felix Garcia	R/R	5 ft 10 in (1.78 m)	195 lb (88 kg)	Jr	Miami, FL
11	C	Jonah Girand	R/R	6 ft 0 in (1.83 m)	200 lb (91 kg)	Sr	Winter Park, FL
2	C	Cal Greenfield	R/R	6 ft 0 in (1.83 m)	205 lb (93 kg)	So	Chicago, IL
44	OF	Austin Langworthy	L/L	5 ft 10 in (1.78 m)	195 lb (88 kg)	Jr	Williston, FL
23	RHP	Jack Leftwich	R/R	6 ft 2 in (1.88 m)	210 lb (95 kg)	So	Orlando, FL
17	RHP	David Luethje	R/R	6 ft 5 in (1.96 m)	192 lb (87 kg)	Fr	Vero Beach, FL
47	RHP	Tommy Mace	R/R	6 ft 6 in (1.98 m)	200 lb (91 kg)	So	Tampa, FL
27	OF	Nelson Maldonado	R/R	5 ft 10 in (1.78 m)	195 lb (88 kg)	Sr	Tampa, FL
13	INF	Brady McConnell	R/R	6 ft 3 in (1.91 m)	195 lb (88 kg)	So	Merritt Island, FL
25	RHP	Hunter McMullen	R/R	6 ft 2 in (1.88 m)	200 lb (91 kg)	So	Ocala, FL
52	RHP	Kirby McMullen	R/R	5 ft 11 in (1.8 m)	200 lb (91 kg)	Jr	Ocala, FL
3	RHP	Garrett Milchin (injured)	L/R	6 ft 5 in (1.96 m)	210 lb (95 kg)	So	Windermere, FL
5	C	Santino Miozzi	R/R	6 ft 2 in (1.88 m)	215 lb (98 kg)	Jr	Maracay, VEN
24	INF	Roberto Peña	R/R	6 ft 2 in (1.88 m)	215 lb (98 kg)	Fr	Caracas, VEN
20	RHP	Nick Pogue	R/R	6 ft 5 in (1.96 m)	225 lb (102 kg)	Fr	Melbourne, FL
12	INF	Blake Reese	S/R	5 ft 11 in (1.8 m)	187 lb (85 kg)	Sr	Tallahassee, FL
28	RHP	Hunter Ruth	R/R	6 ft 2 in (1.88 m)	190 lb (86 kg)	Fr	Gainesville, FL
14	RHP	Christian Scott	R/R	6 ft 4 in (1.93 m)	195 lb (88 kg)	Fr	Parkland, FL
9	C	Brady Smith	R/R	5 ft 11 in (1.8 m)	195 lb (88 kg)	So	Niceville, FL
55	RHP	Ben Specht	R/R	6 ft 1 in (1.85 m)	210 lb (95 kg)	Fr	Fort Myers, FL
1	OF	Jacob Young	R/R	6 ft 0 in (1.83 m)	175 lb (79 kg)	Fr	Ponte Vedra, FL

Head coach

7 Kevin O'Sullivan

Assistant coach(es)

33 Craig Bell
42 Brad Weitzel

Legend

- (C) Team captain
- (S) Suspended
- (I) Ineligible
- Injured
- Current redshirt

Roster
Last update: September 25, 2020

=== By position ===
2019 Florida Gators roster
Pitchers: 3 – Garrett Milchin – (redshirt) Sophomore; 14 – Christian Scott – Freshman; 15 – Jordan Butler – Sophomore; 17 – David Luethje – Freshman; 18 – Tyler Dyson – Junior; 20 – Nick Pogue – Freshman; 21 – Nick Blasucci – (redshirt) Junior; 23 – Jack Leftwich – Sophomore; 25 – Hunter McMullen – Sophomore; 26 – Devin Hemenway – Sophomore; 28 – Hunter Ruth – (redshirt) Freshman; 30 – Felix Garcia – (redshirt) Junior; 32 – Justin Alintoff – Sophomore; 37 – Nolan Crisp – Freshman; 47 – Tommy Mace – Sophomore; 55 – Ben Specht – Freshman	Catchers: 2 – Cal Greenfield – Sophomore; 5 – Santino Miozzi – Junior; 9 – Brady Smith – Sophomore; 11 – Jonah Girand – Senior; Infielders: 8 – Christian Flint – Junior; 12 – Blake Reese – Senior; 13 – Brady McConnell – Sophomore; 22 – Cory Acton – Freshman; 24 – Roberto Peña – Freshman; 34 – Kris Armstrong – Freshman	Outfielders: 1 – Jacob Young – Freshman; 4 – Jud Fabian – Freshman; 6 – Kendrick Calilao – Freshman; 16 – Wil Dalton – Junior; 27 – Nelson Maldonado – Senior; 44 – Austin Langworthy – Junior; 52 – Kirby McMullen – Junior

== Coaching staff ==
Coaching Staff
- 7 – Kevin O'Sullivan – Head coach – 12th year
- 33 – Craig Bell – Assistant coach – 12th year
- 42 – Brad Weitzel – Assistant coach – 12th year
- 31 – Lars Davis – Volunteer assistant coach – 5th year
- Jon Michelini – Athletic trainer – 6th year
- Paul Chandler – Strength & conditioning coordinator – 10th year

== Schedule ==
Legend
	Florida win
	Florida loss
	Postponement
**Bold**	Florida team member

2019 Florida Gators baseball game log
Regular season
February

Date	Opponent	Rank	Stadium Site	Score	Win	Loss	Save	Attendance	Overall Record	SEC Record
February 15	Long Beach State	No. 6	McKethan Stadium; Gainesville, FL	8–2	**Butler** (1–0)	Seminaris (0–1)	None	4,851	1–0	–
February 16	Long Beach State	No. 6	McKethan Stadium	5–2	**Mace** (1–0)	Baayoun (0–1)	**Crisp** (1)	4,344	2–0	–
February 17	Long Beach State	No. 6	McKethan Stadium	3–1	**Leftwich** (1–0)	Ruiz (0–1)	**Crisp** (2)	3,981	3–0	–
February 19	at South Florida	No. 5	USF Baseball Stadium; Tampa, FL	1–6	Stuart (1–0)	**McMullen** (0–1)	None	2,363	3–1	–
February 20	North Florida	No. 5	McKethan Stadium	1–7	Michaelis (1–1)	**Scott** (0–1)	None	3,281	3–2	–
February 22	Miami (FL); Rivalry	No. 5	McKethan Stadium	2–5	McKendry (2–0)	**Butler** (1–1)	Federman (1)	4,775	3–3	–
February 23	Miami (FL); Rivalry	No. 5	McKethan Stadium	9–3	**Mace** (2–0)	Gates (0–1)	**Crisp** (3)	6,206	4–3	–
February 24	Miami (FL); Rivalry	No. 5	McKethan Stadium	4–1	**Leftwich** (2–0)	Van Belle (1–1)	**Crisp** (4)	4,398	5–3	–
February 26	at Jacksonville	No. 7	John Sessions Stadium; Jacksonville, FL	5–4^{10}	**Scott** (1–1)	Mauloni (0–1)	**Crisp** (5)	1,122	6–3	–
February 27	UCF	No. 7	McKethan Stadium	9–12	Westberg (1–0)	**McMullen** (0–2)	Hakanson (1)	3,167	6–4	–

March

Date	Opponent	Rank	Stadium Site	Score	Win	Loss	Save	Attendance	Overall Record	SEC Record
March 1	Winthrop	No. 7	McKethan Stadium	16–4	**Dyson** (1–0)	Harris (0–1)	None	3,335	7–4	–
March 2	Winthrop	No. 7	McKethan Stadium	Postponed (rain) Makeup: March 3 as a doubleheader						
March 3 (1)	Winthrop	No. 7	McKethan Stadium	28–5	**Mace** (3–0)	Peek (1–1)	None	3,357	8–4	–
March 3 (2)	Winthrop	No. 7	McKethan Stadium	5–3^{7}	**Leftwich** (3–0)	Pawelczyk (2–1)	**Crisp** (6)	3,192	9–4	–
March 5	Florida Gulf Coast	No. 5	McKethan Stadium	15–0	**Scott** (2–1)	Bitner (1–1)	None	2,929	10–4	–
March 6	Florida Gulf Coast	No. 5	McKethan Stadium	2–7	Lumbert (2–1)	**Luethje** (0–1)	None	2,955	10–5	–
March 8	Yale	No. 5	McKethan Stadium	6–5	**Mace** (4–0)	Politz (2–1)	**Crisp** (7)	3,249	11–5	–
March 9	Yale	No. 5	McKethan Stadium	15–1	**Leftwich** (4–0)	Nambiar (0–2)	None	3,756	12–5	–
March 10	Yale	No. 5	McKethan Stadium	4–3	**Dyson** (2–0)	Stiegler (1–2)	**Ruth** (1)	3,248	13–5	–
March 12	No. 10 Florida State; Rivalry	No. 5	McKethan Stadium	20–7	**Alintoff** (1–0)	Haney (2–1)	None	5,385	14–5	–
March 15	No. 6 Mississippi State	No. 5	McKethan Stadium	5–6	Small (2–0)	**Mace** (4–1)	None	4,215	14–6	0–1
March 16 (1)	No. 6 Mississippi State	No. 5	McKethan Stadium	5–10	Ginn (5–0)	**Leftwich** (4–1)	Liebelt (2)	4,019	14–7	0–2
March 16 (2)^{[a]}	No. 6 Mississippi State	No. 5	McKethan Stadium	4–2	**Dyson** (2–0)	James (2–1)	**Scott** (1)	3,247	15–7	1–2
March 19	Jacksonville	No. 14	McKethan Stadium	13–8	**Crisp** (1–0)	Murphy (1–1)	**Alintoff** (1)	3,223	16–7	–
March 21	at No. 8 Vanderbilt	No. 14	Hawkins Field; Nashville, TN	0–5	Fellows (5–0)	**Mace** (4–2)	None	3,191	16–8	1–3
March 22	at No. 8 Vanderbilt	No. 14	Hawkins Field	2–15	Raby (4–0)	**Leftwich** (4–2)	None	3,626	16–9	1–4
March 23	at No. 8 Vanderbilt	No. 14	Hawkins Field	4–14	Rocker (2–2)	**Dyson** (3–1)	Brown (5)	3,626	16–10	1–5
March 26	vs. No. 20 Florida State; Rivalry	No. 23	Baseball Grounds; Jacksonville, FL	4–2	**Scott** (2–1)	Velez (2–2)	None	8,041	17–10	–
March 29	Alabama	No. 23	McKethan Stadium	3–1	**Mace** (5–2)	Finnerty (4–3)	None	4,521	18–10	2–5
March 30	Alabama	No. 23	McKethan Stadium	12–3	**Scott** (3–1)	Love (3–1)	None	5,156	19–10	3–5
March 31	Alabama	No. 23	McKethan Stadium	6–3	**Ruth** (1–0)	Ras (1–2)	None	3,785	20–10	4–5
^{^[a]}Rescheduled from March 17 due to the threat of rain.

April

Date	Opponent	Rank	Stadium Site	Score	Win	Loss	Save	Attendance	Overall Record	SEC Record
April 2	Florida A&M	No. 21	McKethan Stadium	12–1	**Crisp** (2–0)	Wilson (1–3)	None	3,036	21–10	–
April 5	at No. 18 Ole Miss	No. 21	Swayze Field; Oxford, MS	4–12	Myers (2–0)	**Mace** (5–3)	None	11,026	21–11	4–6
April 6 (1)	at No. 18 Ole Miss	No. 21	Swayze Field	4–16	Nikhazy (3–2)	**Dyson** (3–2)	None	10,220	21–12	4–7
April 6 (2)^{[b]}	at No. 18 Ole Miss	No. 21	Swayze Field	10–12	Caracci (1–1)	**Crisp** (2–1)	None	10,220	21–13	4–8
April 9	at Florida State; Rivalry		Dick Howser Stadium; Tallahassee, FL	3–1	**Specht** (1–0)	Haney (2–2)	None	5,368	22–13	–
April 11	South Carolina		McKethan Stadium	9–5	**Mace** (6–3)	Morgan (3–2)	None	3,414	23–13	5–8
April 12	South Carolina		McKethan Stadium	3–6	Tringali (2–0)	**Scott** (3–2)	None	4,531	23–14	5–9
April 13	South Carolina		McKethan Stadium	6–4	**Luethje** (1–1)	Sweatt (2–3)	None	4,908	24–14	6–9
April 16	Jacksonville		McKethan Stadium	8–4	**Crisp** (3–1)	Temple (2–1)	**Pogue** (1)	3,337	25–14	–
April 18	at No. 14 LSU		Alex Box Stadium; Baton Rouge, LA	16–9	**Mace** (7–3)	Hilliard (0–2)	None	10,132	26–14	7–9
April 19	at No. 14 LSU		Alex Box Stadium	1–13	Henry (4–2)	**Scott** (3–3)	Peterson (2)	10,766	26–15	7–10
April 20	at No. 14 LSU		Alex Box Stadium	2–11	Walker (3–3)	**Leftwich** (4–3)	None	11,327	26–16	7–11
April 23	Florida Atlantic		McKethan Stadium	11–13	Schneider (3–1)	**Langworthy** (0–1)	None	2,886	26–17	–
April 26	Kentucky		McKethan Stadium	10–8	**Scott** (4–3)	Ramsey (2–4)	**Crisp** (8)	3,664	27–17	8–11
April 27	Kentucky		McKethan Stadium	1–5	Thompson (4–1)	**Leftwich** (4–4)	None	4,068	27–18	8–12
April 28	Kentucky		McKethan Stadium	12–8	**Scott** (5–3)	Coleman (2–4)	None	3,401	28–18	9–12
^{^[b]}Rescheduled from April 7 due to the threat of rain.

May

Date	Opponent	Rank	Stadium Site	Score	Win	Loss	Save	Attendance	Overall Record	SEC Record
May 3	at No. 9 Georgia		Foley Field; Athens, GA	4–6	Locey (8–1)	**Mace** (7–4)	Kristofak (6)	3,106	28–19	9–13
May 4	at No. 9 Georgia		Foley Field	Postponed (rain) Makeup: May 5 as a 7-inning doubleheader						
May 5 (1)	at No. 9 Georgia		Foley Field	1–9^{7}	Elliott (6–3)	**Leftwich** (4–5)	None	2,845	28–20	9–14
May 5 (2)	at No. 9 Georgia		Foley Field	1–4^{7}	Wilcox (2–0)	**Crisp** (3–2)	None	2,845	28–21	9–15
May 7	South Florida		McKethan Stadium	7–3	**Pogue** (1–0)	Yager (2–2)	**Specht** (1)	3,082	29–21	–
May 10	Tennessee		McKethan Stadium	10–9	**Crisp** (4–2)	Walsh (0–2)	None	3,542	30–21	10–15
May 11	Tennessee		McKethan Stadium	7–8	Crochet (4–3)	**Specht** (1–1)	Sewell (1)	3,659	30–22	10–16
May 12	Tennessee		McKethan Stadium	4–5	Jackson (1–0)	**Crisp** (4–3)	Hunley (1)	3,265	30–23	10–17
May 16	at No. 24 Missouri		Taylor Stadium; Columbia, MO	5–4	**Mace** (8–4)	Ash (2–2)	**Butler** (1)	2,310	31–23	11–17
May 17	at No. 24 Missouri		Taylor Stadium	2–0	**Leftwich** (5–5)	Sikkema (7–4)	None	3,182	32–23	12–17
May 18	at No. 24 Missouri		Taylor Stadium	4–3	**Scott** (6–3)	Dulle (4–4)	None	1,675	33–23	13–17

Postseason
SEC Tournament

Date	Opponent	Rank	Stadium Site	Score	Win	Loss	Save	Attendance	Overall Record	SECT Record
May 21	vs. No. 13 (6) Texas A&M	(11)	Metropolitan Stadium; Hoover, AL	7–8^{10}	Kalich (2–1)	**Crisp** (4–4)	None	4,135	33–24	0–1

NCAA tournament: Lubbock Regional

Date	Opponent	Rank	Stadium Site	Score	Win	Loss	Save	Attendance	Overall Record	Regional Record
May 31	vs. No. 24 (2) Dallas Baptist	(3)	Dan Law Field at Rip Griffin Park; Lubbock, TX	8–11	Johnson (5–2)	**Mace** (8–5)	None	4,530	33–25	0–1
June 1	vs. (4) Army	(3)	Dan Law Field at Rip Griffin Park	13–5	**Leftwich** (6–5)	Giovinco (8–6)	None	4,567	34–25	1–1
June 2	vs. No. 24 (2) Dallas Baptist	(3)	Dan Law Field at Rip Griffin Park	8–9	Fouse (6–0)	**Pogue** (1–1)	Carraway (5)	4,679	34–26	1–2

Rankings from D1Baseball. All times Eastern. Parentheses indicate tournament seedings. Retrieved from FloridaGators.com

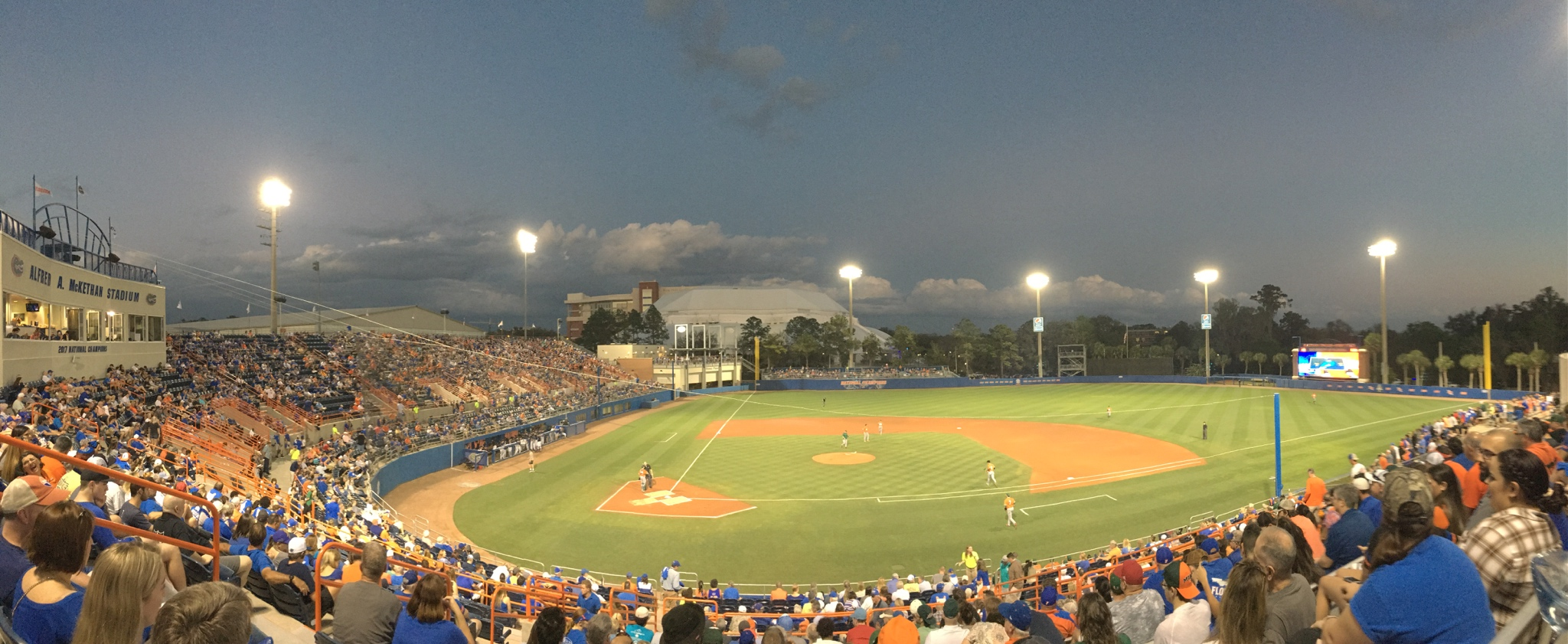
A sellout crowd of 6,206 witnessed Florida defeat Miami 9–3 with a four-run rally in the 7th.

== Lubbock Regional ==
Lubbock Regional Teams
(1) Texas Tech Red Raiders	(2) Dallas Baptist Patriots	(3) Florida Gators	(4) Army Black Knights

First Round
1	Texas Tech	11
4	Army	2
3	Florida	8
2	Dallas Baptist	11
Lower round 1
4	Army	5
3	Florida	13

Semifinals
1	Texas Tech	3
2	Dallas Baptist	2
Lower final
3	Florida	8
2	Dallas Baptist	9

Finals
1	Texas Tech
2	Dallas Baptist

== Record vs. conference opponents ==
Last two do not qualify for conf. tourn. Blank are not scheduled. Blue are home games, otherwise away.

2019 SEC baseball records Source: 2019 SEC baseball game results
Team	W–L	ALA	ARK	AUB	FLA	UGA	KEN	LSU	MSU	MIZZ	MISS	SCAR	TENN	TAMU	VAN	Team	Div	SR	SW
ALA	7–23		1–2	1–2	0–3	0–3	.	1–2	0–3	.	1–2	2–1	.	1–2	0–3	ALA	W7	1–9	0–4
ARK	20–10	2–1		2–1	.	.	2–1	3–0	2–1	3–0	1–2	.	3–0	1–2	1–2	ARK	W1	7–3	3–0
AUB	14–16	2–1	1–2		.	1–2	.	1–2	1–2	.	2–1	2–1	3–0	1–2	0–3	AUB	W6	4–6	1–1
FLA	13–17	3–0	.	.		0–3	2–1	1–2	1–2	3–0	0–3	2–1	1–2	.	0–3	FLA	E5	4–6	2–3
UGA	21–9	3–0	.	2–1	3–0		2–1	2–1	0–3	3–0	.	3–0	1–2	.	2–1	UGA	E2	8–2	4–1
KEN	7–23	.	1–2	.	1–2	1–2		0–3	.	1–2	2–1	1–2	0–3	0–3	0–3	KEN	E7	1–9	0–4
LSU	17–13	2–1	0–3	2–1	2–1	1–2	3–0		3–0	1–2	1–2	.	.	2–1	.	LSU	W3	6–4	2–1
MSU	20–10	3–0	1–2	2–1	2–1	3–0	.	0–3		.	3–0	2–1	2–1	2–1	.	MSU	W2	8–2	3–1
MIZZ	13–16	.	0–3	.	0–3	0–3	2–1	2–1	.		2–1	3–0	2–1	1–1	1–2	MIZZ	E4	5–4	1–3
MISS	16–14	2–1	2–1	1–2	3–0	.	1–2	2–1	0–3	1–2		.	1–2	3–0	.	MISS	W5	5–5	2–1
SCAR	8–22	1–2	.	1–2	1–2	0–3	2–1	.	1–2	0–3	.		1–2	1–2	0–3	SCAR	E6	1–9	0–3
TENN	14–16	.	0–3	0–3	2–1	2–1	3–0	.	1–2	1–2	2–1	2–1		.	1–2	TENN	E3	5–5	1–2
TAMU	16–13	2–1	2–1	2–1	.	.	3–0	1–2	1–2	1–1	0–3	2–1	.		2–1	TAMU	W4	6–3	1–1
VAN	23–7	3–0	2–1	3–0	3–0	1–2	3–0	.	.	2–1	.	3–0	2–1	1–2		VAN	E1	8–2	5–0
Team	W–L	ALA	ARK	AUB	FLA	UGA	KEN	LSU	MSU	MIZZ	MISS	SCAR	TENN	TAMU	VAN	Team	Div	SR	SW

Updated for entire regular season. Missouri at Texas A&M series had one tie game.

== Rankings ==
Ranking movements Legend: ██ Increase in ranking ██ Decrease in ranking — = Not ranked RV = Received votes ( ) = First-place votes
	Week																		
Poll	Pre	1	2	3	4	5	6	7	8	9	10	11	12	13	14	15	16	17	Final
Coaches'	3 (1)	3 (1)*	3 (1)*	6	7	14	24	21	RV	RV	RV	RV	—	RV	RV	RV*	RV*	RV*	—
Baseball America	4	4	5	5	4	9	15	16	—	—	—	—	—	—	—	—*	—*	—*	—
Collegiate Baseball^	6	6	13	14	16	13	19	20	—	25	—	—	—	—	—	—	—	—*	—
NCBWA†	6	6	9	9	6	16	22	18	28	28	RV	RV	—	RV	RV	RV*	RV*	RV*	RV
D1Baseball	6	5	7	5	5	14	23	21	—	—	—	—	—	—	—	—*	—	—*	—

^ Collegiate Baseball ranked 40 teams in their preseason poll, but only ranked 30 teams weekly during the season.
† NCBWA ranks 30 teams in their preseason poll, but only ranks 25 teams weekly during the season.
* A new poll was not released for this week, so for comparison purposes, the previous week's ranking is inserted in this week's slot.

== 2019 MLB draft ==
Player	Position	Round	Overall	MLB team
Brady McConnell	SS	2	44	Kansas City Royals
Tyler Dyson	RHP	5	153	Washington Nationals
Wil Dalton	OF	8	257	Boston Red Sox
Nelson Maldonado	OF	21	642	Chicago Cubs
