= Tanner Burns =

American baseball player (born 1998)

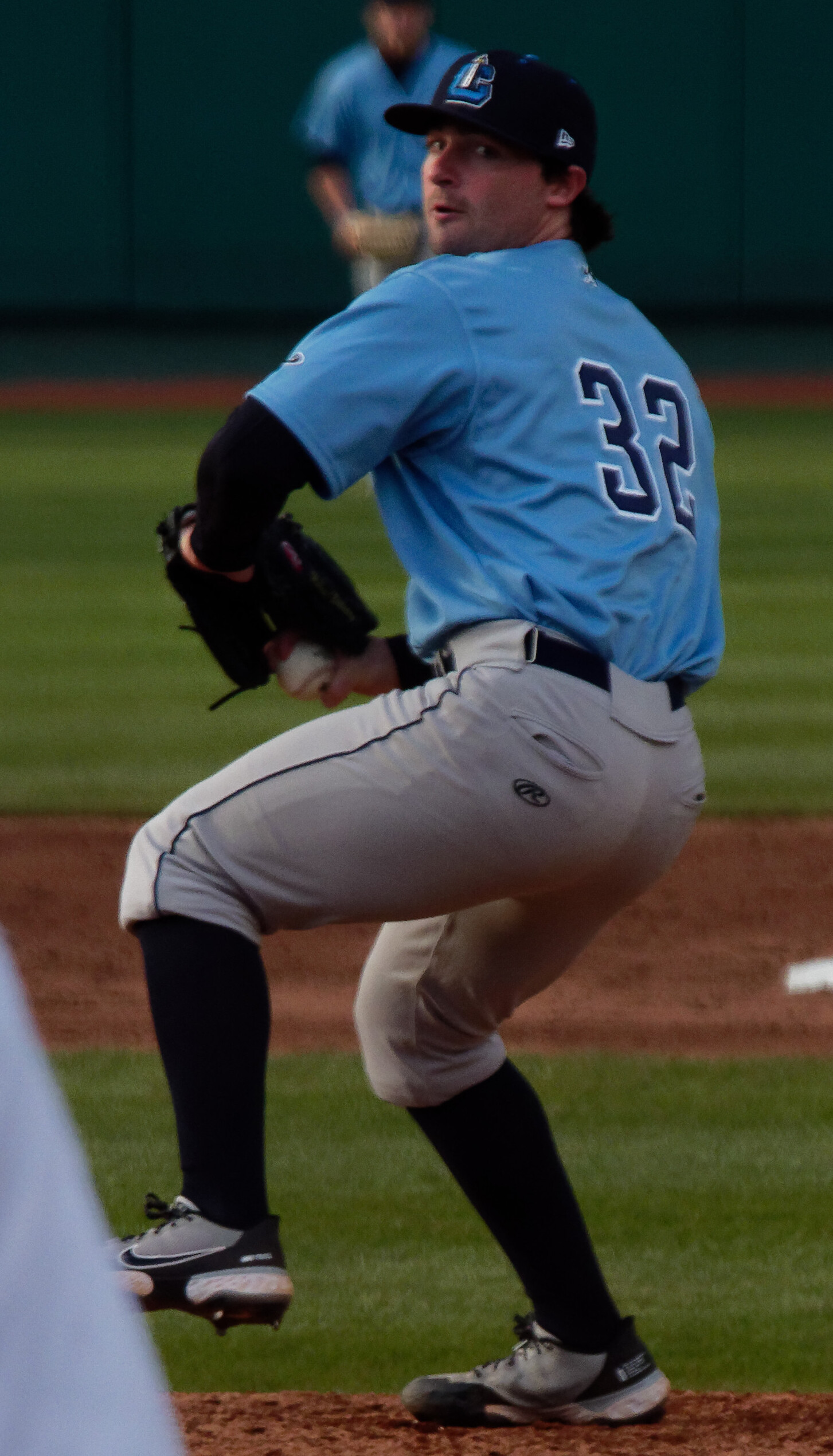
- Burns with the Lake County Captains in 2021

Free agent
- Pitcher
- Born: December 28, 1998 (age 27); Decatur, Alabama, U.S.
- Bats: Right Throws: Right

Lowell Tanner Burns (born December 28, 1998) is an American professional baseball pitcher who is a free agent. He was selected 36th overall by the Cleveland Indians in the 2020 Major League Baseball draft.

== Early life and amateur career ==
Burns grew up in Decatur, Alabama and attended Decatur High School, where he started playing baseball in the eighth grade. As a junior, Burns hit .472 with 13 home runs and 60 RBIs and went 5–2 with two saves, a 1.11 ERA and 80 strikeouts. In his final year of high school, Burns went 10–1 with a 0.88 ERA and 116 strikeouts while batting .467 with 16 homers, 10 doubles, four triples and 46 RBIs and was named Alabama Mr. Baseball, the Alabama Gatorade Player of the Year and the National Player of the Year by the Collegiate Baseball Newspaper. Burns was selected in the 37th round of the 2017 Major League Baseball draft by the New York Yankees but did not sign.

As a true freshman at Auburn University, Burns made 17 starts, posting a 7–4 record with a 3.01 ERA and 77 strikeouts in 86 2/3 innings pitched and was named to the Southeastern Conference (SEC) All-Freshman team and was named a Freshman All-American by Baseball America, Collegiate Baseball, D1 Baseball and Perfect Game/Rawlings. He was named preseason first team All-SEC going into his sophomore season. He went 4–4 with a 2.82 ERA and 101 strikeouts in 15 starts (while battling shoulder issues that cause him to miss a start in Auburn's CWS appearance) and was named a third team all-American by Perfect Game. In 2018, he was selected for United States collegiate national baseball team.

Burns entered his junior season healthy, and on the watchlist for the Golden Spikes Award. He was a preseason All-American selection and was projected to be a first round selection in the 2020 Major League Baseball draft.

== Professional career ==
Burns was selected by the Cleveland Indians with the 36th overall selection of the 2020 Major League Baseball draft. He signed with the Indians on July 17, 2020, for a $1.6MM bonus. He did not play in a game in 2020 due to the cancellation of the minor league season because of the COVID-19 pandemic.

Burns made his professional debut in 2021 with the Lake County Captains of the High-A Central, starting 18 games and going 2–5 with a 3.57 ERA and 91 strikeouts over 75 2/3 innings. He spent the 2022 season with the Double-A Akron RubberDucks, logging a 3-7 record and 3.55 ERA with 92 strikeouts in 88 2/3 innings pitched across 21 starts.

Burns shifted to the bullpen partway through the 2023 season, making 29 appearances (14 starts), in which he compiled a 5-3 record and 3.01 ERA with 86 strikeouts and one saves across 86 2/3 innings pitched. He made 51 relief appearances for the Triple-A Columbus Clippers during the 2024 campaign, registering a 5-3 record and 4.59 ERA with 70 strikeouts and three saves across 68 2/3 innings of work. Burns returned to Columbus in 2025, logging a 3–1 record and 5.86 ERA with 28 strikeouts across 24 appearances.

Burns began the 2026 campaign with Columbus, recording a 7.09 ERA with 29 strikeouts and five saves across 24 appearances. Burns was released by the Guardians organization on August 3, 2026.
