= Will Holland (baseball, born 1998) =

American baseball player (born 1998)

Free agent
- Shortstop
- Born: April 18, 1998 (age 27); Atlanta, Georgia, U.S.
- Bats: Right Throws: Right
- Stats at Baseball Reference

William Christopher Holland (born April 18, 1998) is an American professional baseball shortstop who is a free agent.

== Amateur career ==
Holland graduated from Collins Hill High School in Suwanee, Georgia. As a senior, he hit .436 with two home runs and 13 stolen bases. Undrafted out of high school in the 2016 Major League Baseball draft, he enrolled at Auburn University to play college baseball for the Auburn Tigers.

As a freshman at Auburn in 2017, Holland batted .209 with three home runs and 18 RBI in 45 games. He was named the SEC Freshman of the Week for the week of March 13–19 after going 6 for 15 at the plate, hitting one home run with four RBI and three runs scored. He played in the Perfect Game Collegiate Baseball League that summer. In 2018, as a sophomore, Holland had a breakout year in which he slashed .313/.406/.530 with 12 home runs and 52 RBI in 66 games. He was named to the All-SEC Second Team and to the ABCA All-South Region Team. After the season, he played in the Cape Cod Baseball League for the Hyannis Harbor Hawks along with playing for the USA Baseball Collegiate National Team. Prior to the 2019 season, Holland was named a preseason All-American by multiple outlets including Perfect Game and D1Baseball.com. He struggled his junior year, finishing the season batting .246 with nine home runs and 35 RBI over 64 games.

== Professional career ==
Holland was selected by the Minnesota Twins in the fifth round (149th overall) of the 2019 Major League Baseball draft, and he signed for $575,000. He made his professional debut with the Elizabethton Twins of the Rookie-level Appalachian League, batting .192 with seven home runs, 16 RBI, and eight stolen bases over 36 games. He did not play a minor league game in 2020 since the season was cancelled due to the COVID-19 pandemic. For the 2021 season, Holland was assigned to the Fort Myers Mighty Mussels of the Low-A Southeast, slashing .214/.336/.401 with ten home runs, 27 RBI, and 19 stolen bases over 76 games. He was assigned to the Cedar Rapids Kernels of the High-A Midwest League to begin the 2022 season. In early August, he was promoted to the Wichita Wind Surge of the Double-A Texas League. Over 116 games between the two teams, he slashed .227/.339/.366 with nine home runs, 49 RBI, and 32 stolen bases. Holland returned to Wichita for the 2023 season, playing in 101 games and batting .197 with five home runs, 35 RBI, and thirty stolen bases.

Holland made 41 appearances for the Triple-A St. Paul Saints during the 2024 campaign, slashing .299/.428/.556 with six home runs, 20 RBI, and 13 stolen bases. He split the 2025 season between St. Paul and Fort Myers, batting a combined .203/.299/.348 with eight home runs, 33 RBI, and 11 stolen bases. Holland elected free agency following the season on November 6, 2025.
