= Marc MacMillan =

American baseball coach

Biographical details
- Born: May 7, 1973 (age 53); Memphis, Tennessee
- Education: Ole Miss ('96); Canisius ('11)

Playing career
- 1993–1996: Ole Miss
- Position: Utility

Coaching career (HC unless noted)
- 1999–2008: Memphis University School
- 2009: Crichton
- 2010: Arkansas–Monticello (P/RC)
- 2011–2013: Arkansas–Pine Bluff (P/INF/RC)
- 2016–2020: Ole Miss (OF)
- 2021–2024: Charleston Southern

Head coaching record
- Overall: 86–116 (.426) (NCAA); 23–23 (.500) (NCCAA)
- Tournaments: 4–4 (Big South)

Marc MacMillan is an American baseball coach and former utility player. He played college baseball at Ole Miss for coach Don Kessinger from 1993 to 1996. He then served as the head coach of the Crichton Comets in 2009.

== Coaching career ==
MacMillian began his coaching career as the head baseball coach at Memphis University School. On September 16, 2008, MacMillan was hired as the head baseball coach at Crichton College. On January 23, 2014, MacMillan was named Director of Operations at Ole Miss. On January 6, 2016, MacMillan was promoted to volunteer assistant with the Ole Miss.

On May 15, 2020, MacMillan was named the head baseball coach of the Charleston Southern Buccaneers.

On June 3, 2024, CSU announced that MacMillan would not return after 4 seasons.

== Head coaching record ==
Record table
Season	Team	Overall	Conference	Standing	Postseason
Crichton Comets (Independent) (2009)
2009	Crichton	23–23			
Crichton (NCCAA):		23–23 (.500)			
Charleston Southern Buccaneers (Big South Conference) (2021–2024)
2021	Charleston Southern	18–26	18–22	6th	
2022	Charleston Southern	24–30	13–11	5th	Big South Tournament
2023	Charleston Southern	22–28	13–14	5th	
2024	Charleston Southern	22–32	12–12	4th	Big South Tournament
Charleston Southern:		86–116 (.426)	56–59 (.487)		
Total:		86–116 (.426)			
