= Asa Lacy =

American baseball player (born 1999)

Free Agent
- Pitcher
- Born: June 2, 1999 (age 27); Bryan, Texas, U.S.
- Bats: Left Throws: Left

Asa Edward Lacy (born June 2, 1999) is an American professional baseball pitcher who is a free agent. Lacy was selected fourth overall by the Kansas City Royals in the 2020 Major League Baseball draft.

== Amateur career ==
Lacy attended Tivy High School in Kerrville, Texas. As a senior, he went 13–1 with 0.93 earned run average (ERA) and 128 strikeouts over 97 innings. He was drafted by the Cleveland Indians in the 31st round of the 2017 Major League Baseball draft. He did not sign with the Indians and played college baseball at the Texas A&M University.

Lacy was mostly a relief pitcher his first year at Texas A&M in 2018. He appeared in 23 games with two starts, going 3–1 with a 2.75 ERA and 48 strikeouts. As a sophomore in 2019, he started 15 games going 8–4 with a 2.13 ERA and 130 strikeouts. After the season, he played for the United States collegiate national team. He made four starts in 2020 before the season was cancelled due to the COVID-19 pandemic.

== Professional career ==
Lacy was selected by the Kansas City Royals with the fourth overall pick of the 2020 Major League Baseball draft. He signed with the Royals on June 23 for a bonus of $6.67 million.

Lacy made his professional debut in 2021 with the Quad Cities River Bandits of the High-A Central. Over 14 starts, he went 2-5 with a 5.19 ERA, 79 strikeouts, and 41 walks over 52 innings. He missed over two months due to a shoulder injury. He was selected to play in the Arizona Fall League for the Surprise Saguaros after the season.

Lacy opened the 2022 season with the Northwest Arkansas Naturals of the Double-A Texas League. In 15 combined appearances split between the Naturals and the rookie–level Arizona Complex League Royals, he accumulated a 10.61 ERA with 35 strikeouts across 28 innings pitched.

Lacy did not pitch for the Royals organization in 2023 due to ongoing back issues. On March 19, 2024, Lacy underwent Tommy John surgery, which caused him to miss the entirety of the 2024 season. On June 27, 2025, Lacy was placed on the full-season injured list ending his season without appearing in a game.

On April 20, 2026, Lacy was released by the Royals, having not made an appearance during the season.

== Personal life ==
Although not a fan of a specific team growing up, Lacy's favorite player growing up was fellow Texas native and left handed pitcher Clayton Kershaw.
