= Vanderbilt Commodores baseball statistical leaders =

The Vanderbilt Commodores baseball statistical leaders are individual statistical leaders of the Vanderbilt Commodores baseball program in various categories, including batting average, home runs, runs batted in, runs, hits, stolen bases, ERA, and Strikeouts. Within those areas, the lists identify single-game, single-season, and career leaders. The Commodores represent Vanderbilt University in the NCAA's Southeastern Conference.

Vanderbilt began competing in intercollegiate baseball in 1886. These lists are updated through the end of the 2025 season.

== Batting Average ==
Career
| Rk | Player | AVG | Seasons |
|---|---|---|---|
| 1 | Hunter Bledsoe | .425 | 1997 1999 |
| 2 | Clinton Johnston | .369 | 1996 1997 1998 |
| | Karl Nonemaker | .369 | 1999 2000 2001 2002 |
| 4 | Greg Smith | .358 | 1985 1986 1987 1988 |
| 5 | Anthony Gomez | .354 | 2010 2011 2012 |
| 6 | Pedro Alvarez | .349 | 2006 2007 2008 |
| | Ryan Flaherty | .349 | 2006 2007 2008 |
| | Boomer Whipple | .349 | 1992 1993 1994 1995 |
| 9 | Mike Baxter | .345 | 2004 2005 |
| | Dominic Keegan | .345 | 2019 2020 2021 2022 |

Season
| Rk | Player | AVG | Season |
|---|---|---|---|
| 1 | Hunter Bledsoe | .459 | 1999 |
| 2 | Clinton Johnston | .424 | 1998 |
| 3 | Karl Nonemaker | .415 | 1999 |
| 4 | Warner Jones | .414 | 2004 |
| 5 | Greg Smith | .411 | 1987 |
| | George Flower | .411 | 1985 |
| 7 | Greg Thomas | .401 | 1991 |
| 8 | Scotti Madison | .399 | 1980 |
| 9 | Karl Nonemaker | .393 | 2000 |
| 10 | Austin Martin | .392 | 2019 |

== Home Runs ==
Career
| Rk | Player | HR | Seasons |
|---|---|---|---|
| 1 | Pedro Alvarez | 49 | 2006 2007 2008 |
| | Scotti Madison | 49 | 1977 1978 1979 1980 |
| 3 | Clinton Johnston | 47 | 1996 1997 1998 |
| 4 | Dominic de la Osa | 46 | 2005 2006 2007 2008 |
| 5 | Glenn Davis | 43 | 1995 1996 1997 |
| 6 | Aaron Westlake | 42 | 2008 2009 2010 2011 |
| | Cam Hazen | 42 | 1985 1986 1987 1988 |
| 8 | Josh Adeeb | 41 | 1996 1997 1998 |
| | Nick Morrow | 40 | 1991 1992 1993 1994 |
| 10 | Greg Thomas | 38 | 1991 1992 1993 |

Season
| Rk | Player | HR | Season |
|---|---|---|---|
| 1 | JJ Bleday | 27 | 2019 |
| 2 | Pedro Alvarez | 22 | 2006 |
| 3 | Dominic de la Osa | 20 | 2007 |
| 4 | Josh Adeeb | 19 | 1998 |
| | Clinton Johnston | 19 | 1998 |
| | Nick Morrow | 19 | 1994 |
| 7 | Aaron Westlake | 18 | 2011 |
| | Pedro Alvarez | 18 | 2007 |
| | Glenn Davis | 18 | 1997 |
| | Jason Farese | 18 | 1997 |

Single Game
| Rk | Player | HR | Season | Opponent |
|---|---|---|---|---|
| 1 | Connor Kaiser | 3 | 2018 | Clemson |
| | Steve Chmil | 3 | 1981 | UAB |
| | David Joiner | 3 | 1987 | Samford |
| | Jeff Martin | 3 | 1991 | Valparaiso |
| | Aaron Westlake | 3 | 2011 | Oregon State |

== Runs Batted In ==
Career
| Rk | Player | RBI | Seasons |
|---|---|---|---|
| 1 | Dominic de la Osa | 188 | 2005 2006 2007 2008 |
| 2 | Nick Morrow | 181 | 1991 1992 1993 1994 |
| 3 | Clinton Johnston | 179 | 1996 1997 1998 |
| 4 | Aaron Westlake | 178 | 2008 2009 2010 2011 |
| 5 | Ethan Paul | 175 | 2016 2017 2018 2019 |
| 6 | Ryan Flaherty | 169 | 2006 2007 2008 |
| 7 | Connor Harrell | 168 | 2010 2011 2012 2013 |
| | Greg Thomas | 168 | 1991 1992 1993 |
| 9 | Curt Casali | 167 | 2008 2009 2010 2011 |
| 10 | Jason Esposito | 165 | 2009 2010 2011 |
| | Andrew Giobbi | 165 | 2007 2008 2009 2010 |

Season
| Rk | Player | RBI | Season |
|---|---|---|---|
| 1 | Warner Jones | 74 | 2004 |
| 2 | Clinton Johnston | 74 | 1998 |
| 3 | Ethan Paul | 73 | 2019 |
| 4 | JJ Bleday | 72 | 2019 |
| 5 | Greg Thomas | 71 | 1991 |
| 6 | Philip Clarke | 70 | 2019 |
| | Cesar Nicolas | 70 | 2004 |
| 8 | Zander Wiel | 68 | 2015 |
| | Pedro Alvarez | 68 | 2007 |
| 10 | Connor Harrell | 67 | 2013 |
| | Dominic Keegan | 67 | 2022 |

Single Game
| Rk | Player | RBI | Season | Opponent |
|---|---|---|---|---|
| 1 | Parker Noland | 11 | 2023 | Mississippi State |

== Runs ==
Career
| Rk | Player | R | Seasons |
|---|---|---|---|
| 1 | Nick Morrow | 208 | 1991 1992 1993 1994 |
| 2 | Dominic de la Osa | 204 | 2005 2006 2007 2008 |
| 3 | Enrique Bradfield Jr. | 198 | 2021 2022 2023 |
| 4 | Boomer Whipple | 192 | 1992 1993 1994 1995 |
| 5 | Pedro Alvarez | 191 | 2006 2007 2008 |
| 6 | Aaron Westlake | 181 | 2008 2009 2010 2011 |
| 7 | Tony Kemp | 177 | 2011 2012 2013 |
| | Bart Nielson | 177 | 1991 1992 1993 1994 |
| 9 | Mike Yastrzemski | 176 | 2010 2011 2012 2013 |
| 10 | Bill Hardin | 174 | 1973 1974 1975 1976 |

Season
| Rk | Player | R | Season |
|---|---|---|---|
| 1 | Austin Martin | 87 | 2019 |
| 2 | JJ Bleday | 82 | 2019 |
| 3 | Dansby Swanson | 76 | 2015 |
| | Pedro Alvarez | 76 | 2007 |
| 5 | Ryan Klosterman | 72 | 2004 |
| | Boomer Whipple | 71 | 1994 |
| 7 | Rhett Wiseman | 70 | 2015 |
| | Pedro Alvarez | 70 | 2006 |
| 9 | Vee Hightower | 69 | 1993 |
| | Enrique Bradfield Jr. | 69 | 2022 |
| | Enrique Bradfield Jr. | 69 | 2023 |

Single Game
| Rk | Player | R | Season | Opponent |
|---|---|---|---|---|
| 1 | 11 players | 5 | Most recent: Brian Harris, 2010 vs. Georgia | |

== Hits ==
Career
| Rk | Player | H | Seasons |
|---|---|---|---|
| 1 | Dominic de la Osa | 300 | 2005 2006 2007 2008 |
| 2 | Karl Nonemaker | 283 | 1999 2000 2001 2002 |
| 3 | Boomer Whipple | 282 | 1992 1993 1994 1995 |
| 4 | Anthony Gomez | 267 | 2010 2011 2012 |
| 5 | Jim Schifman | 266 | 1987 1988 1989 1990 |
| 6 | Alex Feinberg | 264 | 2005 2006 2007 2008 |
| | Ryan Flaherty | 264 | 2006 2007 2008 |
| 8 | Aaron Westlake | 263 | 2008 2009 2010 2011 |
| 9 | Bryan Reynolds | 260 | 2014 2015 2016 |
| 10 | David Macias | 255 | 2005 2006 2007 2008 |

Season
| Rk | Player | H | Season |
|---|---|---|---|
| 1 | Warner Jones | 111 | 2004 |
| 2 | Austin Martin | 105 | 2019 |
| | Pedro Alvarez | 105 | 2007 |
| 4 | Tony Kemp | 104 | 2013 |
| | Ryan Flaherty | 104 | 2007 |
| 6 | Anthony Gomez | 96 | 2011 |
| | David Macias | 96 | 2008 |
| 8 | JJ Bleday | 95 | 2019 |
| | Bryan Reynolds | 95 | 2014 |
| | Hunter Bledsoe | 95 | 1999 |

Single Game
| Rk | Player | H | Season | Opponent |
|---|---|---|---|---|
| 1 | Ralph Greenbaum | 6 | 1957 | Middle Tennessee |
| | Spencer Jones | 6 | 2022 | Indiana State |

== Stolen Bases ==
Career
| Rk | Player | SB | Seasons |
|---|---|---|---|
| 1 | Enrique Bradfield Jr. | 130 | 2021 2022 2023 |
| 2 | Charles DeFrance | 96 | 1980 1981 1982 |
| 3 | Vee Hightower | 91 | 1990 1991 1992 1993 |
| 4 | Joey Cora | 84 | 1983 1984 1985 |
| 5 | Bob Schabes | 78 | 1986 1987 1988 1989 |
| 6 | Jim Schifman | 73 | 1987 1988 1989 1990 |
| 7 | Tony Kemp | 72 | 2011 2012 2013 |
| 8 | Dominic de la Osa | 68 | 2005 2006 2007 2008 |
| 9 | Jeren Kendall | 67 | 2015 2016 2017 |
| 10 | Jason Esposito | 66 | 2009 2010 2011 |

Season
| Rk | Player | SB | Season |
|---|---|---|---|
| 1 | Bob Schabes | 51 | 1989 |

Single Game
| Rk | Player | SB | Season | Opponent |
|---|---|---|---|---|
| | Jimmy Conn | 5 | 1971 | Belmont |
| | Joey Cora | 5 | 1985 | David Lipscomb |
| | Boomer Whipple | 5 | 1994 | Western Kentucky |

== Earned Run Average ==
Career
| Rk | Player | ERA | Seasons |
|---|---|---|---|
| 1 | Jeff Peeples | 1.68 | 1970 1971 1972 1973 |
| 2 | Carson Fulmer | 1.99 | 2013 2014 2015 |
| 3 | Jack Leiter | 2.08 | 2020 2021 |
| 4 | Brian Miller | 2.32 | 2012 2013 2014 |
| 5 | Nick Maldonado | 2.62 | 2020 2021 2022 2023 |
| 6 | Grayson Garvin | 2.62 | 2009 2010 2011 |
| 7 | Kyle Wright | 2.78 | 2015 2016 2017 |
| 8 | Walker Buehler | 2.87 | 2013 2014 2015 |
| 9 | Kumar Rocker | 2.89 | 2019 2020 2021 |
| 10 | John McLean | 2.93 | 1970 1971 1972 1973 |

Season
| Rk | Player | ERA | Season |
|---|---|---|---|
| 1 | Jimmy Stephens | 1.07 | 1949 |
| 2 | Jeff Peeples | 1.30 | 1972 |
| 3 | Jeff Peeples | 1.56 | 1971 |
| 4 | Jeff Peeples | 1.64 | 1973 |
| 5 | Carson Fulmer | 1.83 | 2015 |
| 6 | Carson Fulmer | 1.98 | 2014 |
| 7 | Mason Hickman | 2.05 | 2019 |
| 8 | Kevin Ziomek | 2.12 | 2013 |
| 9 | Jack Leiter | 2.13 | 2021 |
| 10 | Lewis Ray | 2.19 | 1976 |

== Strikeouts ==
Career
| Rk | Player | K | Seasons |
|---|---|---|---|
| 1 | David Price | 441 | 2005 2006 2007 |
| 2 | Mike Willis | 350 | 1969 1970 1971 1972 |
| 3 | Jeremy Sowers | 327 | 2002 2003 2004 |
| 4 | Kumar Rocker | 321 | 2019 2020 2021 |
| 5 | Sonny Gray | 317 | 2009 2010 2011 |
| 6 | Carson Fulmer | 313 | 2013 2014 2015 |
| 7 | Drake Fellows | 308 | 2017 2018 2019 |
| 8 | Mike Minor | 303 | 2007 2008 2009 |
| 9 | Kyle Wright | 290 | 2015 2016 2017 |
| 10 | Patrick Raby | 288 | 2016 2017 2018 2019 |

Season
| Rk | Player | K | Season |
|---|---|---|---|
| 1 | David Price | 194 | 2007 |
| 2 | Kumar Rocker | 179 | 2021 |
| | Jack Leiter | 179 | 2021 |
| 4 | Carson Fulmer | 167 | 2015 |
| 5 | David Price | 155 | 2006 |
| 6 | Drake Fellows | 133 | 2019 |
| 7 | Sonny Gray | 132 | 2011 |
| 8 | Doug Wessel | 131 | 1971 |
| 9 | Mason Hickman | 129 | 2019 |
| 10 | Jeremy Sowers | 123 | 2003 |

Single Game
| Rk | Player | K | Season | Opponent |
|---|---|---|---|---|
| 1 | Doug Wessel | 23 | 1970 | Tennessee-Chattanooga. |
