= Tennessee Volunteers baseball statistical leaders =

The Tennessee Volunteers baseball statistical leaders are individual statistical leaders of the Tennessee Volunteers baseball program in various categories, including batting average, home runs, runs batted in, runs, hits, stolen bases, ERA, and Strikeouts. Within those areas, the lists identify single-game, single-season, and career leaders. The Volunteers represent the University of Tennessee in the NCAA's Southeastern Conference.

Tennessee began competing in intercollegiate baseball in 1897. These lists are updated through the end of the 2025 season.

== Batting Average ==
Career (Min. 200 ABs)
Rk	Player	AVG	Seasons
1	Sam Ewing	.411	1968 1969 1970
2	Chris Burke	.404	1999 2000 2001
3	John Huffstetler	.397	1951 1952 1953
4	Bobby Tucker	.389	1970 1971 1972 1973
5	Rick Honeycutt	.376	1973 1974 1975 1976
6	Jeff Pickler	.375	1996 1997 1998
7	Sonny Cortez	.370	1996 1998
	Todd Helton	.370	1993 1994 1995
9	Bubba Trammell	.368	1993 1994
10	Andy Blanco	.360	1991 1992

Season (Min. 75 ABs)
Rk	Player	AVG	Season
1	Sam Ewing	.464	1970
2	Jeff Pickler	.445	1998
3	Chris Burke	.435	2001
4	Andy Blanco	.432	1992
5	John Huffstetler	.429	1952
6	Sam Ewing	.420	1969
7	Travis Copley	.419	1998
8	B.B. Hopkins	.414	1953
9	Chuck Barclift	.413	1980
10	Roger McKinney	.408	1971

== Home Runs ==
Career
Rk	Player	HR	Seasons
1	Christian Moore	61	2022 2023 2024
2	Blake Burke	50	2022 2023 2024
3	Luc Lipcius	40	2017 2018 2019 2020 2021 2022
4	Evan Russell	39	2018 2019 2020 2021 2022
5	Todd Helton	38	1993 1994 1995
6	Doug Hecker	37	1990 1991 1992
7	Cody Hawn	36	2009 2010
	Sonny Cortez	36	1996 1998
9	Jordan Beck	34	2020 2021 2022
	Bobby Tucker	34	1970 1971 1972 1973

Season
Rk	Player	HR	Season
1	Christian Moore	34	2024
2	Andrew Fischer	25	2025
3	Sonny Cortez	24	1998
4	Billy Amick	23	2024
	Dylan Dreiling	23	2024
6	Trey Lipscomb	22	2022
	Cody Hawn	22	2009
8	Henry Ford	20	2026
	Blake Burke	20	2024
	Kavares Tears	20	2024
	Chris Burke	20	2001
	Todd Helton	20	1995
	Chuck Barclift	20	1980

Single Game
Rk	Player	HR	Season	Opponent
1	several	3	Most recent: Blake Grimmer, 2026 vs. Ole Miss	

== Runs Batted In ==
Career
Rk	Player	RBI	Seasons
1	Todd Helton	238	1993 1994 1995
2	Jeff Christensen	177	1998 1999 2000 2001
3	Travis Copley	174	1995 1996 1997 1998
4	J. P. Arencibia	165	2005 2006 2007
5	Evan Russell	162	2018 2019 2020 2021 2022
6	Christian Moore	160	2022 2023 2024
7	Doug Hecker	158	1990 1991 1992
8	Chris Burke	156	1999 2000 2001
9	Stevie Daniel	149	1999 2000 2001
10	Bobby Tucker	147	1970 1971 1972 1973

Season
Rk	Player	RBI	Season
1	Todd Helton	92	1995
2	Sonny Cortez	87	1998
3	Trey Lipscomb	84	2022
4	Cody Hawn	81	2009
5	Todd Helton	80	1994
6	Dylan Dreiling	75	2024
7	Christian Moore	74	2024
8	Jeff Christensen	73	2001
9	Eli Iorg	72	2005
10	J. P. Arencibia	71	2005

Single Game
Rk	Player	RBI	Season	Opponent
1	Joe Randa	10	1991	Louisville

== Runs ==
Career
Rk	Player	R	Seasons
1	Chris Burke	224	1999 2000 2001
2	Todd Helton	199	1993 1994 1995
3	Stevie Daniel	186	1999 2000 2001
4	Christian Moore	179	2022 2023 2024
5	Justin Ross	169	1996 1997 1998
6	Jeff Christensen	164	1998 1999 2000 2001
7	Luc Lipcius	158	2017 2018 2019 2020 2021 2022
8	Jeff Pickler	157	1996 1997 1998
	Travis Copley	157	1995 1996 1997 1998
	Mike Basse	157	1989 1990 1991
	Ronnie Hartsfield	157	1978 1979 1980 1981

Season
Rk	Player	R	Season
1	Chris Burke	105	2001
2	Todd Helton	86	1995
3	Christian Moore	83	2024
4	Chase Headley	82	2005
5	Jeff Pickler	79	1998
	Justin Ross	79	1998
7	Blake Burke	74	2024
8	Kavares Tears	73	2024
9	Dylan Dreiling	72	2024
10	Matt Whitley	71	1995

Single Game
Rk	Player	R	Season	Opponent
1	several	5	Most recent: Gavin Kilen, 2025 vs. Rice	

== Hits ==
Career
Rk	Player	H	Seasons
1	Chris Burke	314	1999 2000 2001
2	Todd Helton	280	1993 1994 1995
3	Jeff Pickler	259	1996 1997 1998
4	Michael Rivera	246	2003 2004 2005 2006
	Stevie Daniel	246	1999 2000 2001
6	Ronnie Hartsfield	237	1978 1979 1980 1981
7	J. P. Arencibia	230	2005 2006 2007
8	Travis Copley	229	1995 1996 1997 1998
9	Zach Osborne	225	2009 2010 2011 2012
10	Julio Borbon	223	2005 2006 2007

Season
Rk	Player	H	Season
1	Chris Burke	118	2001
2	Christian Moore	111	2024
3	Chris Burke	109	2000
	Jeff Pickler	109	1998
5	Blake Burke	108	2024
6	Todd Helton	105	1995
7	Eli Iorg	96	2005
8	Chase Headley	92	2005
	Eric King	92	2005
10	J. P. Arencibia	91	2005
	Stevie Daniel	91	2001

Single Game
Rk	Player	H	Season	Opponent
1	Kris Bennett	6	2001	Georgia
	Chris Burke	6	2000	Hawaii-Hilo
	Jeff Pickler	6	1998	College of Charleston
	Larry Fielder	6	1968	Georgia Tech

== Stolen Bases ==
Career
Rk	Player	SB	Seasons
1	Mike Basse	145	1989 1990 1991
2	Stevie Daniel	134	1999 2000 2001
3	Chris Burke	124	1999 2000 2001
4	Clay Greene	87	1996 1997
5	Jay Charleston	67	2017 2018 2019
6	Will Maddox	60	2012 2013 2014
7	Jordan Czarniecki	56	2002 2003
	Jeff Christensen	56	1998 1999 2000 2001
9	Ronnie Hartsfield	55	1978 1979 1980 1981
10	Eli Iorg	53	2004 2005
	Bobby Gaylor	53	1984 1985 1986

Season
Rk	Player	SB	Season
1	Stevie Daniel	58	2000
2	Chris Burke	56	2000
3	Clay Greene	54	1997
4	Mike Basse	53	1989
5	Chris Burke	49	2001
	Mike Basse	49	1991
7	Stevie Daniel	46	2001
8	Mike Basse	43	1990
9	Jay Charleston	41	2019
	Coleman Smith	41	1991

Single Game
Rk	Player	SB	Season	Opponent
1	Clay Greene	6	1997	Middle Tennessee

== Earned Run Average ==
Career (Min. 100 IP)
Rk	Player	ERA	Seasons
1	Jimmy Lee	1.85	1968 1969 1970
2	Redmond Walsh	1.93	2017 2018 2019 2020 2021 2022
3	Mike Duvall	2.09	1967 1968 1969
4	Todd Helton	2.24	1993 1994 1995
5	Zander Sechrist	2.52	2021 2022 2023 2024
6	John Hammett	2.60	1966 1967 1968
7	David Tiller	2.61	1965 1966 1967
8	Sean Hunley	2.71	2018 2019 2020 2021
9	Mark Cummings	2.79	1974 1975
10	Camden Sewell	2.84	2019 2020 2021 2022 2023

Season (Min. 50 IPs)
Rk	Player	ERA	Season
1	Todd Helton	0.89	1994
2	Jimmy Lee	1.30	1968
3	Jimmy Lee	1.57	1969
4	David Tiller	1.61	1967
5	Todd Helton	1.66	1995
6	John Hammett	1.93	1968
7	Joe O'Brien	1.95	1972
8	Mark Cummings	1.99	1974
9	Derek Tharpe	2.01	2004
10	Don Varner	2.19	1970

== Strikeouts ==
Career
Rk	Player	K	Seasons
1	James Adkins	380	2005 2006 2007
2	R.A. Dickey	345	1994 1995 1996
3	Luke Hochevar	287	2003 2004 2005
4	Jamie Bennett	253	1999 2000
	Bryan Morgado	253	2007 2008 2009 2010
6	Drew Beam	249	2022 2023 2024
	Rich DeLucia	249	1983 1984 1985 1986
8	Ryan Meyers	246	1993 1994 1995 1996
9	Andy Cox	230	2013 2014 2015 2016
10	Chase Dollander	228	2022 2023

Season
Rk	Player	K	Season
1	Liam Doyle	164	2025
2	Luke Hochevar	154	2005
3	Jamie Bennett	142	1999
4	R.A. Dickey	137	1996
5	James Adkins	135	2005
6	James Adkins	133	2007
7	A.J. Causey	125	2024
8	Chad Dallas	122	2021
9	R.A. Dickey	121	1995
10	Chase Dollander	120	2023
	Chris Freeman	120	1994

Single Game
Rk	Player	K	Season	Opponent
1	Joe O'Brien	20	1972	Maryville
