= 2019 Arkansas Razorbacks baseball team =

American college baseball season

2019 Arkansas Razorbacks baseball
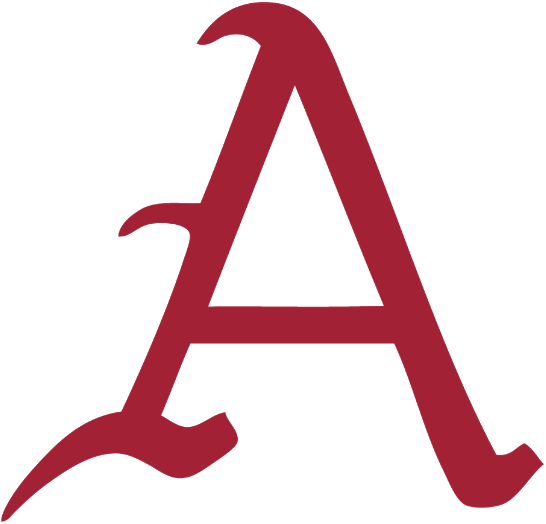

Fayetteville Super Regional champion Fayetteville Regional champion SEC Western Division co-champion

College World Series, 7th (tie)
- Conference: Southeastern Conference
- Western Division

Ranking
- Coaches: No. 6
- CB: No. 7
- Record: 46–20 (20–10 SEC)
- Head coach: Dave Van Horn (17th season)
- Assistant coaches: Nate Thompson; Matt Hobbs
- Home stadium: Baum–Walker Stadium, Dickey–Stephens Park (Alternate)

2019 Southeastern Conference baseball standings
	Conf.						Overall
Team	W		L		T	PCT	W		L		T	PCT
Eastern
No. 1 Vanderbilt ^{x}‍†‍‡‍^{y}	23	–	7	–	0	.767	58	–	12	–	0	.829
No. 18 Georgia ‍‍‍^{y}	21	–	9	–	0	.700	46	–	17	–	0	.730
Tennessee ‍‍‍^{y}	14	–	16	–	0	.467	40	–	21	–	0	.656
Missouri ‍‍‍	13	–	16	–	1	.450	34	–	22	–	1	.605
Florida ‍‍‍^{y}	13	–	17	–	0	.433	34	–	26	–	0	.567
South Carolina ‍‍‍	8	–	22	–	0	.267	28	–	28	–	0	.500
Kentucky ‍‍‍	7	–	23	–	0	.233	26	–	29	–	0	.473
Western
No. 5 Mississippi State ^{x}‍‍‍^{y}	20	–	10	–	0	.667	52	–	15	–	0	.776
No. 6 Arkansas ^{x}‍‍‍^{y}	20	–	10	–	0	.667	46	–	20	–	0	.697
No. 14 LSU ‍‍‍^{y}	17	–	13	–	0	.567	40	–	26	–	0	.606
No. 20 Texas A&M ‍‍‍^{y}	16	–	13	–	1	.550	39	–	23	–	1	.627
No. 12 Ole Miss ‍‍‍^{y}	16	–	14	–	0	.533	41	–	27	–	0	.603
No. 9 Auburn ‍‍‍^{y}	14	–	16	–	0	.467	38	–	28	–	0	.576
Alabama ‍‍‍	7	–	23	–	0	.233	30	–	26	–	0	.536
x – Division champion † – Conference champion ‡ – Tournament champion y – Invited to the NCAA tournament As of June 25, 2019; Rankings from D1Baseball

The 2019 Arkansas Razorbacks baseball team represented the University of Arkansas in the 2019 NCAA Division I baseball season. The Razorbacks were coached by Dave Van Horn, in his 17th season with the Razorbacks, and played home games at Baum–Walker Stadium. Arkansas ended the 2018 season as runners-up in the College World Series (CWS). Five starting fielders and two starting pitchers from the 2018 team had moved on to professional baseball or graduation. Expectations were high for the 2019 team, picked to finished third in the SEC West and ranked between #12-25 in preseason polls.

Arkansas finished with a 46–18 (20–10 SEC) record, winning the SEC West and entering the postseason ranked #4-6 nationally. The Razorbacks swept the Fayetteville Regional and defeated Ole Miss in the Fayetteville Super Regional to clinch the school's tenth CWS, making back-to-back trips for the first time in school history. Arkansas lost two one-run games in Omaha.

== Preseason ==
Arkansas scheduled two preseason exhibition games in Fall 2018 following a rule change by the NCAA. The first was scheduled against Oklahoma at L. Dale Mitchell Park on September 22, but was cancelled due to rain. The Razorbacks played Wichita State (coached by longtime Arkansas assistant coach Todd Butler) at home on October 5, playing 14 innings. The Razorbacks traveled to Little Rock to play the Little Rock Trojans for a second exhibition game. The exhibition match-up at Gary Hogan Field was the first for the Razorbacks against an in-state opponent in program history. The final week of fall practice was a best-of-five annual intrasquad Fall World Series.

In November, it was announced pitching coach Wes Johnson has been hired by the Minnesota Twins. Arkansas hired Matt Hobbs, who had coached the previous four seasons at Wake Forest. Head coach Dave Van Horn was inducted into the Arkansas Sports Hall of Fame in January 2019.

=== Preseason All-American teams ===
1st Team

- Matt Cronin - Relief Pitcher (Baseball America)
- Heston Kjerstad - Outfielder (Perfect Game)
- Heston Kjerstad - Outfielder (D1Baseball)
- Heston Kjerstad - Outfielder (NCBWA)
- Casey Martin - Shortstop (D1Baseball)
- Casey Martin - Shortstop (NCBWA)

2nd Team

- Casey Martin - Third Baseman (Perfect Game)
- Matt Cronin - Relief Pitcher (Perfect Game)
- Matt Cronin - Relief Pitcher (D1Baseball)
- Dominic Fletcher - Outfielder (Baseball America)

3rd Team

- Matt Cronin - Relief Pitcher (NCBWA)
- Dominic Fletcher - Outfielder (Perfect Game)
- Heston Kjerstad - Outfielder (Baseball America)
- Casey Martin - Shortstop (Collegiate Baseball)

=== SEC media poll ===
The SEC media poll was released on February 7, 2019, with the Razorbacks predicted to finish in third place in the Western Division.

Media poll (West)
Predicted finish	Team	Votes (1st place)
1	LSU	88 (10)
2	Ole Miss	65 (1)
3	Arkansas	59 (1)
4	Auburn	57 (1)
5	Texas A&M	48 (1)
6	Mississippi State	47
7	Alabama	21

=== Preseason All-SEC teams ===
1st Team

- Casey Martin - Shortstop
- Heston Kjerstad - Outfielder
- Dominic Fletcher - Outfielder
- Matt Cronin - Relief Pitcher

== Roster ==
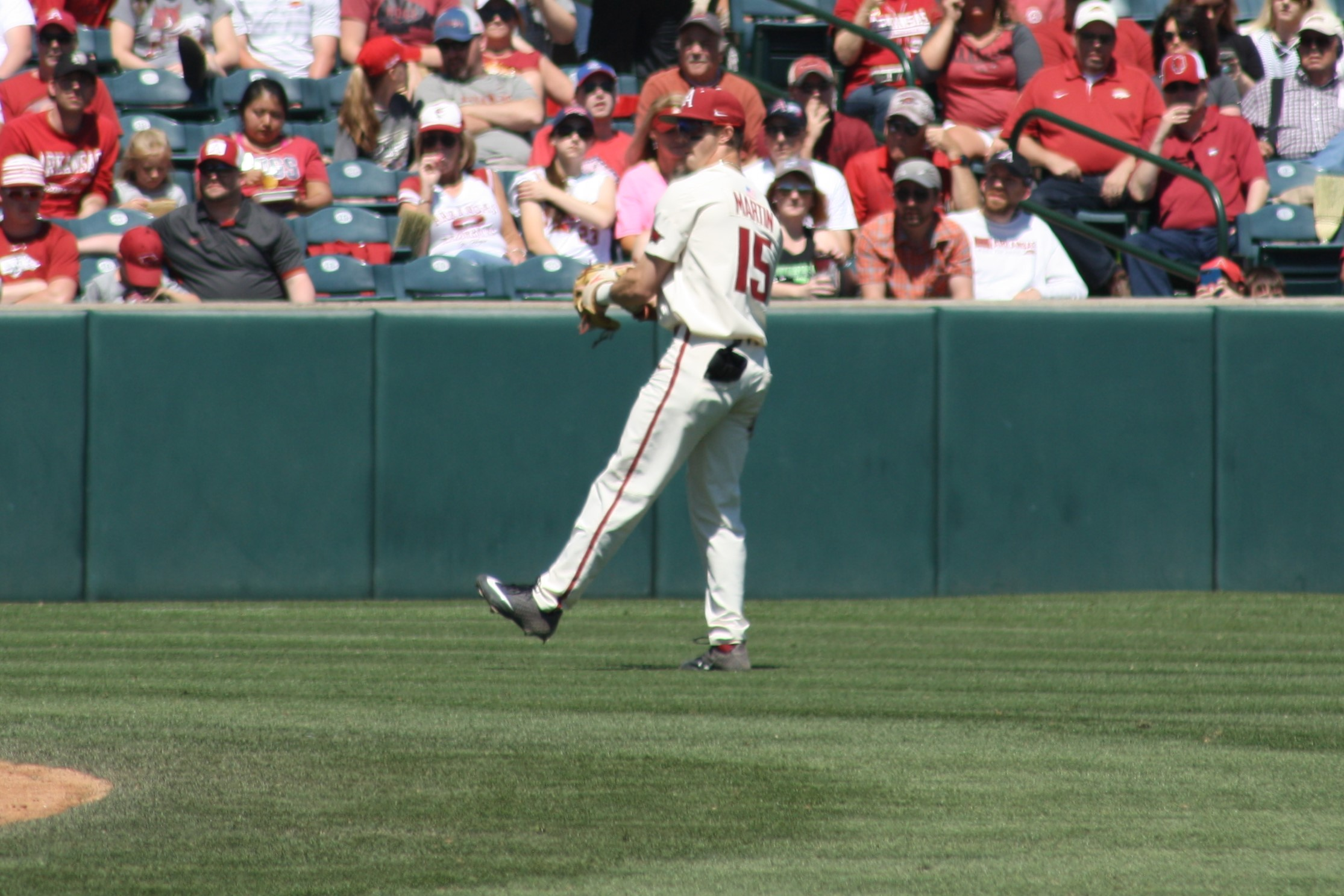
Casey Martin

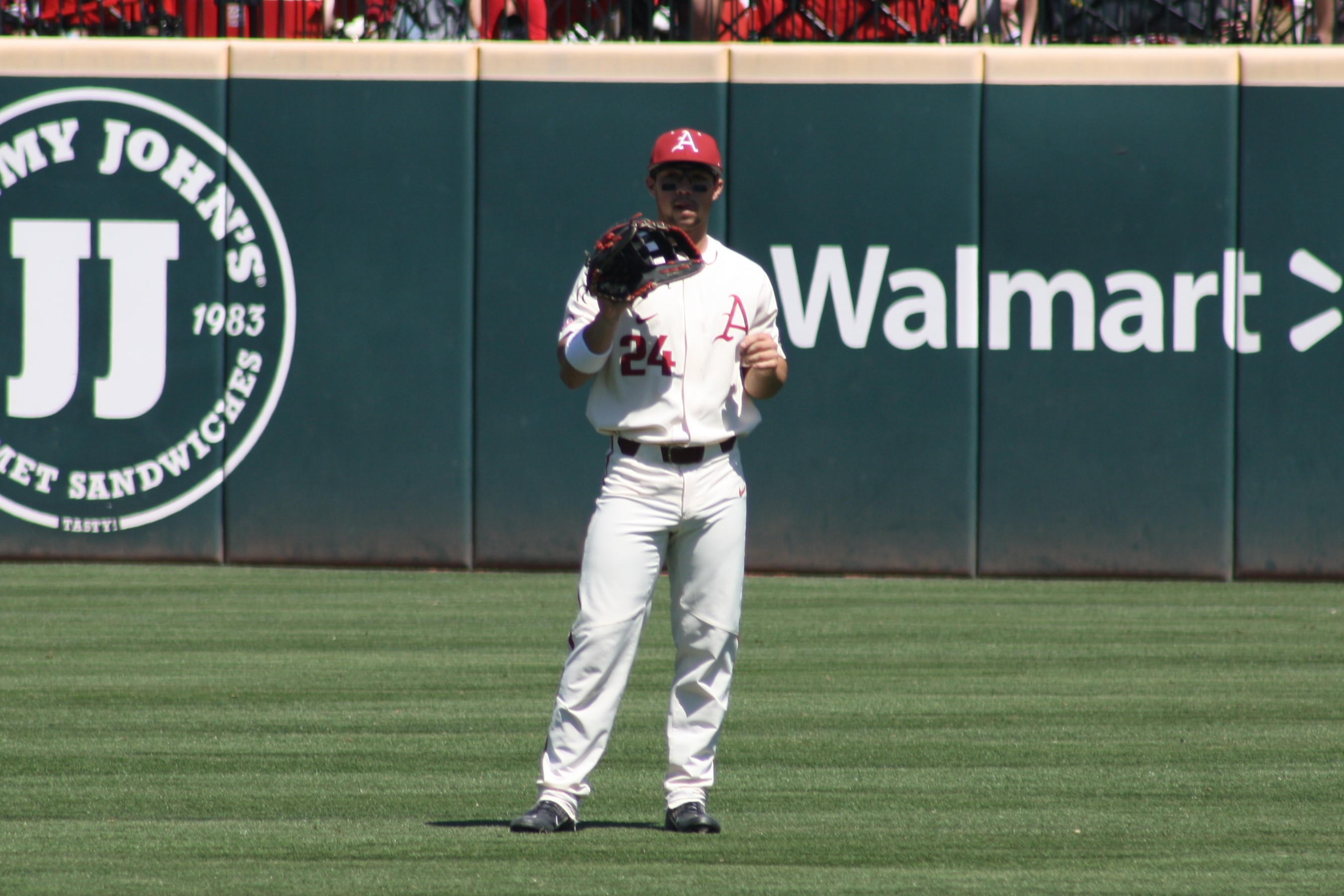
Dominic Fletcher

2019 Arkansas Razorbacks roster
Pitchers: 13 Connor Noland - Freshman; 20 Elijah Trest - Freshman; 21 Jacob Burton - Freshman; 26 Travis Hester - Freshman; 28 Kole Ramage - Sophomore; 29 Angus Denton - (redshirt) Sophomore; 31 Caleb Bolden - Sophomore; 32 Matt Cronin - Junior; 33 Patrick Wicklander - Freshman; 34 Steven Sanchez - Freshman; 35 Jacob Kostyshock - Junior; 37 Caden Monke - Freshman; 39 Evan Taylor - Freshman; 45 Kevin Kopps - (redshirt) Junior; 46 Carter Sells - Freshman; 49 Liam Henry - Freshman; 52 Collin Taylor - (redshirt) Sophomore; 54 Will Barker - Freshman; 55 Isaiah Campbell - (redshirt) Junior; 57 Cody Scroggins - (redshirt) Junior; 88 Zebulon Vermillion - Sophomore	Catchers: 12 Casey Opitz - Sophomore; 16 Andrew Stanley - Freshman; 48 Zack Plunkett - (redshirt) Senior; Infielders: 3 Zack Gregory - Freshman; 4 Trevor Ezell - (redshirt) Senior; 5 Jacob Nesbit - (redshirt) Freshman; 7 Jack Kenley - Junior; 8 Jordan McFarland - Junior; 10 Matt Goodheart - Sophomore; 14 Caleb Denny - Freshman; 15 Casey Martin - Sophomore	Outfielders: 18 Heston Kjerstad - Sophomore; 24 Dominic Fletcher - Junior; 25 Christian Franklin - Freshman; 27 Dillon Lifrieri - Freshman; 41 Trey Harris - Freshman; 43 Curtis Washington Jr. - Freshman; Dave Van Horn - Coach

== Schedule and results ==
Legend
	Arkansas win
	Arkansas loss
	Postponement
**Bold**	Arkansas team member

2019 Arkansas Razorbacks baseball game log
Regular season (40–15)

February (6–1)
Date	Opponent	Rank	Site/stadium	Score	Win	Loss	Save	TV	Att.	Record	SEC
Feb. 16	Eastern Illinois	No. 16	Baum–Walker Stadium; Fayetteville, Arkansas	**W** 15–7	**I. Campbell** (1–0)	Jones (0–1)	None	SECN+	DH	1–0	
Feb. 16	Eastern Illinois	No. 16	Baum–Walker Stadium	**W** 12–3	**K. Ramage** (1–0)	Yasenka (0–1)	None	SECN+	8,838	2–0	
Feb. 17	Eastern Illinois	No. 16	Baum–Walker Stadium	**W** 3–2	**M. Cronin** (1–0)	Malatestinic (0–1)	None	SECN+	7,382	3–0	
Feb. 21	at USC	No. 16	Dedeaux Field; Los Angeles, California	**W** 6–3	**K. Ramage** (2–0)	Longrie (0–1)	**M. Cronin** (1)	PAC-12+	377	4–0	
Feb. 22	at USC	No. 16	Dedeaux Field	**W** 8–6	**I. Campbell** (2–0)	Hurt (0–1)	**M. Cronin** (2)	PAC-12+	994	5–0	
Feb. 23	at USC	No. 16	Dedeaux Field	**L** 4–6	Clarke (2–0)	**P. Wicklander** (0–1)	None	PAC-12+	799	5–1	
Feb. 27	Memphis	No. 16	Baum–Walker Stadium	**W** 10–3	**Z. Vermillion** (1–0)	Denz (0–1)	None	SECN+	6,990	6–1	

March (16–5)
Date	Opponent	Rank	Site/stadium	Score	Win	Loss	Save	TV	Att.	Record	SEC
Mar. 1	Stony Brook	No. 16	Baum–Walker Stadium	**W** 3–1	**I. Campbell** (3–0)	G. Marino (1–2)	**M. Cronin** (3)	SECN+	DH	7–1	
Mar. 1	Stony Brook	No. 16	Baum–Walker Stadium	**W** 4–3	**K. Ramage** (3–0)	B. Herrmann (1–1)	**J. Kostyshock** (1)	SECN+	7,234	8–1	
Mar. 2	Stony Brook	No. 16	Baum–Walker Stadium	**W** 15–7	**Z. Vermillion** (2–0)	N. DeGennaro (0–1)	None	SECN+	8,117	9–1	
Mar. 5	Charlotte	No. 15	Baum–Walker Stadium	Cancelled							
Mar. 6	Charlotte	No. 15	Baum–Walker Stadium	**W** 9–2	**P. Wicklander** (1–1)	Czanstkowski (0–2)	None	SECN+	6,976	10–1	
Mar. 8	Louisiana Tech	No. 15	Baum–Walker Stadium	**W** 4–2	**K. Kopps** (1–0)	Griffen (2–2)	**M. Cronin** (4)	SECN+	8,246	11–1	
Mar. 9	Louisiana Tech	No. 15	Baum–Walker Stadium	**L** 7–12	Robbins (1–0)	**J. Kostyshock** (0–1)	Smith (2)	SECN+	9,272	11–2	
Mar. 10	Louisiana Tech	No. 15	Baum–Walker Stadium	**W** 11–0	**C. Scroggins** (1–0)	Bailey (1–2)	None	SECN+	7,572	12–2	
Mar. 12	Western Illinois	No. 14	Baum–Walker Stadium	**W** 8–0	**P. Wicklander** (2–1)	Dorethy (0–3)	None	SECN+	6,926	13–2	
Mar. 13	Western Illinois	No. 14	Baum–Walker Stadium	**W** 11–1 (8)	**M. Denton** (1–0)	Foy (0–3)	None	SECN+	6,869	14–2	
Mar. 15	Missouri	No. 14	Baum–Walker Stadium	**W** 2–0	**I. Campbell** (4–0)	Cantleberry (2–1)	**M. Cronin** (5)	SECN+	8,150	15–2	1–0
Mar. 16	Missouri	No. 14	Baum–Walker Stadium	**W** 4–3	**K. Ramage** (4–0)	Sikkema (2–1)	**M. Cronin** (6)	SECN+	9,521	16–2	2–0
Mar. 17	Missouri	No. 14	Baum–Walker Stadium	**W** 3–2	**J. Kostyshock** (1–1)	Dulle (1–2)	None	SECN+	9,281	17–2	3–0
Mar. 19	at No. 9 Texas	No. 11	UFCU Disch–Falk Field; Austin, Texas	**W** 11–4	**K. Ramage** (5–0)	Neely (0–1)	None	LHN	6,208	18–2	
Mar. 20	at No. 9 Texas	No. 11	UFCU Disch–Falk Field	**L** 6–7	Stevens (2–1)	**E. Trest** (0–1)	Quintanilla (4)	LHN	6,260	18–3	
Mar. 22	at Alabama	No. 11	Sewell–Thomas Stadium; Tuscaloosa, Alabama	**W** 12–3	**I. Campbell** (5–0)	Finnerty (4–2)	None	SECN+	4,060	19–3	4–0
Mar. 23	at Alabama	No. 11	Sewell–Thomas Stadium	**L** 0–10	Love (3–0)	**C. Noland** (0–1)	None	SECN+	4,317	19–4	4–1
Mar. 24	at Alabama	No. 11	Sewell–Thomas Stadium	**W** 10–2	**C. Scroggins** (2–0)	Freeman (2–2)	None	SECN+	3,687	20–4	5–1
Mar. 26	at Missouri State	No. 8	Hammons Field; Springfield, Missouri	**W** 8–2	**Z. Vermillion** (3–0)	Juenger (0–2)	None		2,457	21–4	
Mar. 29	No. 24 Ole Miss	No. 8	Baum–Walker Stadium	**W** 5–3	**I. Campbell** (6–0)	Ethridge (4–2)	**M. Cronin** (7)	ESPNU	10,251	22–4	6–1
Mar. 30	No. 24 Ole Miss	No. 8	Baum–Walker Stadium	**L** 3–4	Miller (2–0)	**K. Kopps** (1–1)	Caracci (6)	SECN	9,642	22–5	6–2
Mar. 31	No. 24 Ole Miss	No. 8	Baum–Walker Stadium	**L** 5–10	Phillips (3–1)	**K. Kopps** (1–2)	Myers (1)	SECN+	8,433	22–6	6–3

April (13–5)
Date	Opponent	Rank	Site/stadium	Score	Win	Loss	Save	TV	Att.	Record	SEC
April 2	Little Rock	No. 14	Baum–Walker Stadium	**L** 7–17	T. Gordon (2–1)	**K. Ramage** (5–1)	E. Daily (1)	SECN+	7,956	22–7	6–3
April 5	at No. 15 Auburn	No. 14	Plainsman Park; Auburn, Alabama	**L** 3–6	Anderson (5–0)	**K. Kopps** (1–3)	Greenhill (7)	ESPNU	DH	22–8	6–4
April 5	at No. 15 Auburn	No. 14	Plainsman Park	**W** 9–6 (15)	**K. Kopps** (2–3)	Skipper (3–2)	None	SECN+	DH	23–8	7–4
April 6	at No. 15 Auburn	No. 14	Plainsman Park	**W** 8–0	**P. Wicklander** (3–1)	Fitts (2–1)	**Z. Vermillion** (1)	SECN+	3,731	24–8	8–4
April 9	Oral Roberts	No. 12	Baum–Walker Stadium	**W** 15–8	**K. Ramage** (6–1)	Odom (0–3)	None	SECN+	8,723	25–8	
April 12	at No. 7 Vanderbilt	No. 12	Hawkins Field; Nashville, Tennessee	**L** 2–3	Fellows (7–0)	**I. Campbell** (6–1)	Brown (7)	SECN	3,465	25–9	8–5
April 13	at No. 7 Vanderbilt	No. 12	Hawkins Field	**L** 2–12	Rocker (3–4)	**C. Noland** (0–2)	None	ESPNU	3,305	25–10	8–6
April 14	at No. 7 Vanderbilt	No. 12	Hawkins Field	**W** 14–12	**Z. Vermillion** (4–0)	Brown (1–1)	**M. Denton** (1)	SECN+	3,488	26–10	9–6
April 16	Arkansas–Pine Bluff	No. 12	Baum–Walker Stadium	**W** 16–4 (7)	**C. Noland** (1–2)	Benoi (0–6)	None	SECN+	7,805	27–10	
April 18	No. 3 Mississippi State	No. 12	Baum–Walker Stadium	**W** 5–3	**I. Campbell** (7–1)	M. Small (4–1)	**M. Cronin** (8)	ESPNU	8,338	28–10	10–6
April 19	No. 3 Mississippi State	No. 12	Baum–Walker Stadium	**W** 12–5	**K. Kopps** (3–3)	Plumlee (2–3)	None	SECN+	9,573	29–10	11–6
April 20	No. 3 Mississippi State	No. 12	Baum–Walker Stadium	**W** 10–2	**C. Noland** (2–2)	Ginn (7–2)	None	SECN+	11,087	30–10	12–6
April 23	Northwestern State	No. 8	Baum–Walker Stadium	**W** 19–2	**K. Ramage** (7–1)	Swanson (0–2)	None	SECN+	7,659	31–10	
April 24	Northwestern State	No. 8	Baum–Walker Stadium	**L** 7–10	Hodo (1–2)	**L. Henry** (0–1)	Pigott (2)	SECN+	7,626	31–11	
April 26	No. 20 Tennessee	No. 8	Baum–Walker Stadium	**W** 11–9	**K. Kopps** (4–3)	Schultz (2–1)	**M. Cronin** (9)	SECN+	11,787	32–11	13–6
April 27	No. 20 Tennessee	No. 8	Baum–Walker Stadium	**W** 15–3	**P. Wicklander** (4–1)	Stallings (7–3)	None	SECN+	11,594	33–11	14–6
April 28	No. 20 Tennessee	No. 8	Baum–Walker Stadium	**W** 4–3 (10)	**E. Trest** (1–1)	Walsh (0–1)	None	SECN	9,419	34–11	15–6
April 30	Grambling State	No. 8	Dickey–Stephens Park; North Little Rock, Arkansas	**W** 17–3	**M. Denton** (2–0)	Matthews (0–2)	None		10,543	35–11	

May (5–4)
Date	Opponent	Rank	Site/stadium	Score	Win	Loss	Save	TV	Att.	Record	SEC
May 3	at Kentucky	No. 5	Kentucky Proud Park; Lexington, Kentucky	**W** 5–2	**I. Campbell** (8–1)	Ramsey (2–5)	**M. Cronin** (10)	SECN+	4,225	36–11	16–6
May 5	at Kentucky	No. 5	Kentucky Proud Park	**W** 9–1 (7)	**P. Wicklander** (5–1)	Marsh (3–2)	None	SECN+	DH	37–11	17–6
May 5	at Kentucky	No. 5	Kentucky Proud Park	**L** 3–4 (7)	Thompson (5–1)	**C. Noland** (2–3)	Coleman (4)	SECN+	3,749	37–12	17–7
May 9	LSU	No. 4	Baum–Walker Stadium	**W** 14–4	**I. Campbell** (9–1)	Hilliard (0–3)	None	ESPNU	9,220	38–12	18–7
May 10	LSU	No. 4	Baum–Walker Stadium	**W** 11–6	**K. Kopps** (5–3)	Hess (3–4)	None	SECN+	11,714	39–12	19–7
May 11	LSU	No. 4	Baum–Walker Stadium	**L** 2–3	Peterson (4–2)	**J. Kostyshock** (1–2)	None	ESPN2	11,037	39–13	19–8
May 16	at No. 17 Texas A&M	No. 4	Olsen Field at Blue Bell Park; College Station, Texas	**W** 7–3	**I. Campbell** (10–1)	Weber (4–1)	None	SECN+	4,639	40–13	20–8
May 17	at No. 17 Texas A&M	No. 4	Olsen Field at Blue Bell Park	**L** 2–6	Doxakis (7–3)	**P. Wicklander** (5–2)	None	SECN+	5,438	40–14	20–9
May 18	at No. 17 Texas A&M	No. 4	Olsen Field at Blue Bell Park	**L** 1–6	Roa (3–2)	**C. Noland** (2–4)	None	SECN+	5,550	40–15	20–10

Postseason (6–5)

SEC Tournament (1–2)
Date	Opponent	Rank (Seed)	Site/stadium	Score	Win	Loss	Save	TV	Att.	Record	SECT
May 22	vs. No. 22 (7) Ole Miss	No. 5 (2)	Hoover Metropolitan Stadium; Hoover, Alabama	**W** 5–3	**K. Kopps** (6–3)	Phillips (4–3)	**M. Cronin** (11)	SECN	5,264	41–15	1–0
May 23	vs. No. 7 (3) Georgia	No. 5 (2)	Hoover Metropolitan Stadium	**L** 1–3	Webb (1–0)	**J. Kostyshock** (1–3)	Schunk (12)	SECN	8,620	41–16	1–1
May 24	vs. No. 22 (7) Ole Miss	No. 5 (2)	Hoover Metropolitan Stadium	**L** 2–3	Miller (5–2)	**Z. Vermillion** (4–1)	Caracci (10)	SECN	14,294	41–17	1–2

Fayetteville Regional (3–0)
Date	Opponent	Rank (Seed)	Site/stadium	Score	Win	Loss	Save	TV	Att.	Record	NCAAT
May 31	(4) Central Connecticut	No. 5 (1)	Baum–Walker Stadium	**W** 11–5	**C. Noland** (3–4)	Fox (3–6)	None	ESPN3	10,037	42–17	1–0
June 1	(3) TCU	No. 5 (1)	Baum–Walker Stadium	**W** 3–1	**I. Campbell** (11–1)	Lodolo (6–6)	**M. Cronin** (12)	ESPN3	10,967	43–17	2–0
June 2	(3) TCU	No. 5 (1)	Baum–Walker Stadium	**W** 6–0	**P. Wicklander** (6–2)	Janczak (0–4)	None	ESPNU	10,242	44–17	3–0

Fayetteville Super Regional (2–1)
Date	Opponent	Nat'l Seed	Site/stadium	Score	Win	Loss	Save	TV	Att.	Record	NCAAT
June 8	No. 14 Ole Miss	No. 5	Baum–Walker Stadium	**W** 11–2	**I. Campbell** (12–1)	Ethridge (7–7)	None	ESPN	11,350	45–17	4–0
June 9	No. 14 Ole Miss	No. 5	Baum–Walker Stadium	**L** 5–13	Nikhazy (9–3)	**C. Noland** (3–5)	Roth (1)	ESPNU	11,383	45–18	4–1
June 10	No. 14 Ole Miss	No. 5	Baum–Walker Stadium	**W** 14–1	**C. Scroggins** (3–0)	Hoglund (3–3)	None	ESPN2	11,095	46–18	5–1

College World Series (0–2)
Date	Opponent	Nat'l Seed	Site/stadium	Score	Win	Loss	Save	TV	Att.	Record	CWS
June 15	Florida State	No. 5	TD Ameritrade Park Omaha; Omaha, Nebraska	**L** 0–1	Parrish (9–5)	**C. Scroggins** (3–1)	Flowers (13)	ESPN	26,155	46–19	0–1
June 17	No. 8 Texas Tech	No. 5	TD Ameritrade Park Omaha	**L** 4–5	McMillon (4–3)	**C. Scroggins** (3–2)	Floyd (4)	ESPN	19,236	46–20	0–2

Schedule source • Rankings based on the teams' current ranking in the D1Baseball poll

== SEC Tournament ==
SEC Tournament Second Round
(7) Ole Miss Rebels	vs.	(2) Arkansas Razorbacks

May 22, 2019, 1:00 pm (CDT) at Hoover Metropolitan Stadium in Hoover, Alabama
Team	1	2	3	4	5	6	7	8	9	R	H	E
(7) Ole Miss	0	0	0	0	2	1	0	0	0	3	5	2
(2) Arkansas	1	0	1	0	0	2	0	1	X	5	5	1
WP: Kevin Kopps (6–3) LP: Zack Phillips (4–3) Sv: Matt Cronin (11); Attendance: 5,264

SEC Tournament Third Round
(2) Arkansas Razorbacks	vs.	(3) Georgia Bulldogs

May 23, 2019, 4:30 pm (CDT) at Hoover Metropolitan Stadium in Hoover, Alabama
Team	1	2	3	4	5	6	7	8	9	R	H	E
(2) Arkansas	0	0	1	0	0	0	0	0	0	1	5	0
(3) Georgia	0	0	0	0	0	0	1	2	X	3	6	1
WP: Ryan Webb (1–0) LP: Jacob Kostyshock (1–3) Sv: Aaron Schunk (12); Attendance: 8,620

SEC Tournament Third Round Consolation
(2) Arkansas Razorbacks	vs.	(7) Ole Miss Rebels

May 24, 2019, 3:00 pm (CDT) at Hoover Metropolitan Stadium in Hoover, Alabama
Team	1	2	3	4	5	6	7	8	9	R	H	E
(2) Arkansas	0	0	0	2	0	0	0	0	0	2	5	1
(7) Ole Miss	0	0	0	0	1	0	0	2	X	3	3	1
WP: Austin Miller (5–2) LP: Zebulon Vermillion (4–1) Sv: Parker Caracci (10); Home runs: ARK: Matt Goodheart (3); MISS: Kevin Graham (9); Attendance: 14,294

== Fayetteville Regional ==
Fayetteville Regional Teams
(1) Arkansas Razorbacks	(2) California Golden Bears	(3) TCU Horned Frogs	(4) Central Connecticut Blue Devils

First Round
1	Arkansas	11
4	Central Connecticut	5
2	California	2
3	TCU	13
Lower round 1
4	Central Connecticut	6
2	California	3

Semi-Finals
1	Arkansas	3
3	TCU	1
Lower final
3	TCU	9
4	Central Connecticut	5

Finals
1	Arkansas
3	TCU

Fayetteville Regional Round 1
(4) Central Connecticut Blue Devils	vs.	(1) Arkansas Razorbacks

May 31, 2019, 1:00 pm (CDT) at Baum–Walker Stadium in Fayetteville, Arkansas
Team	1	2	3	4	5	6	7	8	9	R	H	E
(4) Central Connecticut	0	0	0	1	0	1	0	3	0	5	5	1
(1) Arkansas	0	2	0	1	3	3	0	2	X	11	13	3
WP: Connor Noland (3–4) LP: Brandon Fox (3–6); Home runs: CCSU: TT Bowens (5); ARK: Heston Kjerstad (15); Trevor Ezell (9); Attendance: 10,037

Fayetteville Regional Round 2
(1) Arkansas Razorbacks	vs.	(3) TCU Horned Frogs

June 1, 2019, 6:00 p.m. (CDT) at Baum–Walker Stadium in Fayetteville, Arkansas
Team	1	2	3	4	5	6	7	8	9	R	H	E
(1) Arkansas	0	0	0	0	0	3	0	0	0	3	9	0
(3) TCU	0	0	0	0	0	0	1	0	0	1	4	1
WP: Isaiah Campbell (11–1) LP: Nick Lodolo (6–6) Sv: Matt Cronin (12); Attendance: 10,967

Fayetteville Regional Final
(3) TCU Horned Frogs	vs.	(1) Arkansas Razorbacks

June 2, 2019, 8:30 p.m. (CDT) at Baum–Walker Stadium in Fayetteville, Arkansas
Team	1	2	3	4	5	6	7	8	9	R	H	E
(3) TCU	0	0	0	0	0	0	0	0	0	0	5	0
(1) Arkansas	3	0	0	0	2	0	0	1	X	6	10	0
WP: Patrick Wicklander (6–2) LP: Jared Janczak (0–4) Sv: None; Home runs: TCU: None; ARK: Matt Goodheart (4); Attendance: 10,242

== Fayetteville Super Regional ==
Fayetteville Super Regional – Game One
(12) Ole Miss Rebels	vs.	(5) Arkansas Razorbacks

June 8, 2019, 11:00 a.m. (CDT) at Baum–Walker Stadium in Fayetteville, Arkansas
Team	1	2	3	4	5	6	7	8	9	R	H	E
(12) Ole Miss	1	0	0	0	0	0	0	0	1	2	5	1
(5) Arkansas	4	2	0	3	0	2	0	0	X	11	11	0
WP: Isaiah Campbell (12–1) LP: Will Ethridge (7–7) Sv: None; Home runs: MISS: Grae Kessinger (6); Thomas Dillard (14); ARK: Jack Kenley (13); Matt Goodheart (5); Trevor Ezell (10); Attendance: 11,350

Fayetteville Super Regional – Game Two
(5) Arkansas Razorbacks	vs.	(12) Ole Miss Rebels

June 9, 2019, 2:00 p.m. (CDT) at Baum–Walker Stadium in Fayetteville, Arkansas
Team	1	2	3	4	5	6	7	8	9	R	H	E
(5) Arkansas	2	0	0	3	0	0	0	0	0	5	12	0
(12) Ole Miss	3	5	0	0	0	3	2	0	X	13	12	0
WP: Doug Nikhazy (9–3) LP: Connor Noland (3–5) Sv: Houston Roth (1); Home runs: ARK: Dominic Fletcher (11); MISS: Grae Kessinger (7); Tyler Keenan (15); Cole Zabowski (12); Cooper Johnson (8); Attendance: 11,383

Fayetteville Super Regional – Game Three
(12) Ole Miss Rebels	vs.	(5) Arkansas Razorbacks

June 10, 2019, 3:00 p.m. (CDT) at Baum–Walker Stadium in Fayetteville, Arkansas
Team	1	2	3	4	5	6	7	8	9	R	H	E
(12) Ole Miss	1	0	0	0	0	0	0	0	0	1	7	0
(5) Arkansas	0	4	3	1	1	5	0	0	X	14	12	0
WP: Cody Scroggins (3–0) LP: Gunnar Hoglund (3–3) Sv: None; Home runs: MISS: None; ARK: Heston Kjerstad (16); Casey Opitz (3); Attendance: 11,095

== College World Series ==
College World Series First Round
Florida State Seminoles	vs.	(5) Arkansas Razorbacks

June 15, 2019, 6:00 p.m. (CDT) at TD Ameritrade Park Omaha in Omaha, Nebraska
Team	1	2	3	4	5	6	7	8	9	R	H	E
Florida State												
(5) Arkansas												

== Record vs. conference opponents ==
Last two do not qualify for conf. tourn. Blank are not scheduled. Blue are home games, otherwise away.

2019 SEC baseball records Source: 2019 SEC baseball game results
Team	W–L	ALA	ARK	AUB	FLA	UGA	KEN	LSU	MSU	MIZZ	MISS	SCAR	TENN	TAMU	VAN	Team	Div	SR	SW
ALA	7–23		1–2	1–2	0–3	0–3	.	1–2	0–3	.	1–2	2–1	.	1–2	0–3	ALA	W7	1–9	0–4
ARK	20–10	2–1		2–1	.	.	2–1	3–0	2–1	3–0	1–2	.	3–0	1–2	1–2	ARK	W1	7–3	3–0
AUB	14–16	2–1	1–2		.	1–2	.	1–2	1–2	.	2–1	2–1	3–0	1–2	0–3	AUB	W6	4–6	1–1
FLA	13–17	3–0	.	.		0–3	2–1	1–2	1–2	3–0	0–3	2–1	1–2	.	0–3	FLA	E5	4–6	2–3
UGA	21–9	3–0	.	2–1	3–0		2–1	2–1	0–3	3–0	.	3–0	1–2	.	2–1	UGA	E2	8–2	4–1
KEN	7–23	.	1–2	.	1–2	1–2		0–3	.	1–2	2–1	1–2	0–3	0–3	0–3	KEN	E7	1–9	0–4
LSU	17–13	2–1	0–3	2–1	2–1	1–2	3–0		3–0	1–2	1–2	.	.	2–1	.	LSU	W3	6–4	2–1
MSU	20–10	3–0	1–2	2–1	2–1	3–0	.	0–3		.	3–0	2–1	2–1	2–1	.	MSU	W2	8–2	3–1
MIZZ	13–16	.	0–3	.	0–3	0–3	2–1	2–1	.		2–1	3–0	2–1	1–1	1–2	MIZZ	E4	5–4	1–3
MISS	16–14	2–1	2–1	1–2	3–0	.	1–2	2–1	0–3	1–2		.	1–2	3–0	.	MISS	W5	5–5	2–1
SCAR	8–22	1–2	.	1–2	1–2	0–3	2–1	.	1–2	0–3	.		1–2	1–2	0–3	SCAR	E6	1–9	0–3
TENN	14–16	.	0–3	0–3	2–1	2–1	3–0	.	1–2	1–2	2–1	2–1		.	1–2	TENN	E3	5–5	1–2
TAMU	16–13	2–1	2–1	2–1	.	.	3–0	1–2	1–2	1–1	0–3	2–1	.		2–1	TAMU	W4	6–3	1–1
VAN	23–7	3–0	2–1	3–0	3–0	1–2	3–0	.	.	2–1	.	3–0	2–1	1–2		VAN	E1	8–2	5–0
Team	W–L	ALA	ARK	AUB	FLA	UGA	KEN	LSU	MSU	MIZZ	MISS	SCAR	TENN	TAMU	VAN	Team	Div	SR	SW

Updated for entire regular season. Missouri at Texas A&M series had one tie game.

== Rankings ==
Ranking movements Legend: ██ Increase in ranking ██ Decrease in ranking
	Week																		
Poll	Pre	1	2	3	4	5	6	7	8	9	10	11	12	13	14	15	16	17	Final
Coaches'	12	12*		10	10	9	8	9	10	10	7	6	4	4	5	5	5*	5*	6
Baseball America															4	4	4*	4*	8
Collegiate Baseball^	25	23	22	16	17	10	9	8	7	9	8	6	5	4	5	4	4	2	7
NCBWA†	15	13	13	14	13	8	8	10	9	8	7	6	5	5	6	8	8*	8*	7
D1Baseball	16	16	16	15	14	11	8	14	12	12	8	5	4	4	5	5	5*	5*	6

^ Collegiate Baseball ranked 40 teams in their preseason poll, but only ranked 30 teams weekly during the season.
† NCBWA ranks 30 teams in their preseason poll, but only ranks 25 teams weekly during the season.
* A new poll was not released for this week, so for comparison purposes, the previous week's ranking is inserted in this week's slot.

== 2019 MLB draft ==
Player	Position	Round	Overall	MLB team
Dominic Fletcher	OF	B	75	Arizona Diamondbacks
Isaiah Campbell	RHP	B	76	Seattle Mariners
Matt Cronin	LHP	4	123	Washington Nationals
Jack Kenley	2B	8	232	Detroit Tigers
Jacob Kostyshock	RHP	8	249	Colorado Rockies
Cody Scroggins	RHP	9	287	Boston Red Sox
Zack Plunkett	C	20	611	Los Angeles Dodgers
