= Chris Burke (baseball) =

American baseball player (born 1980)

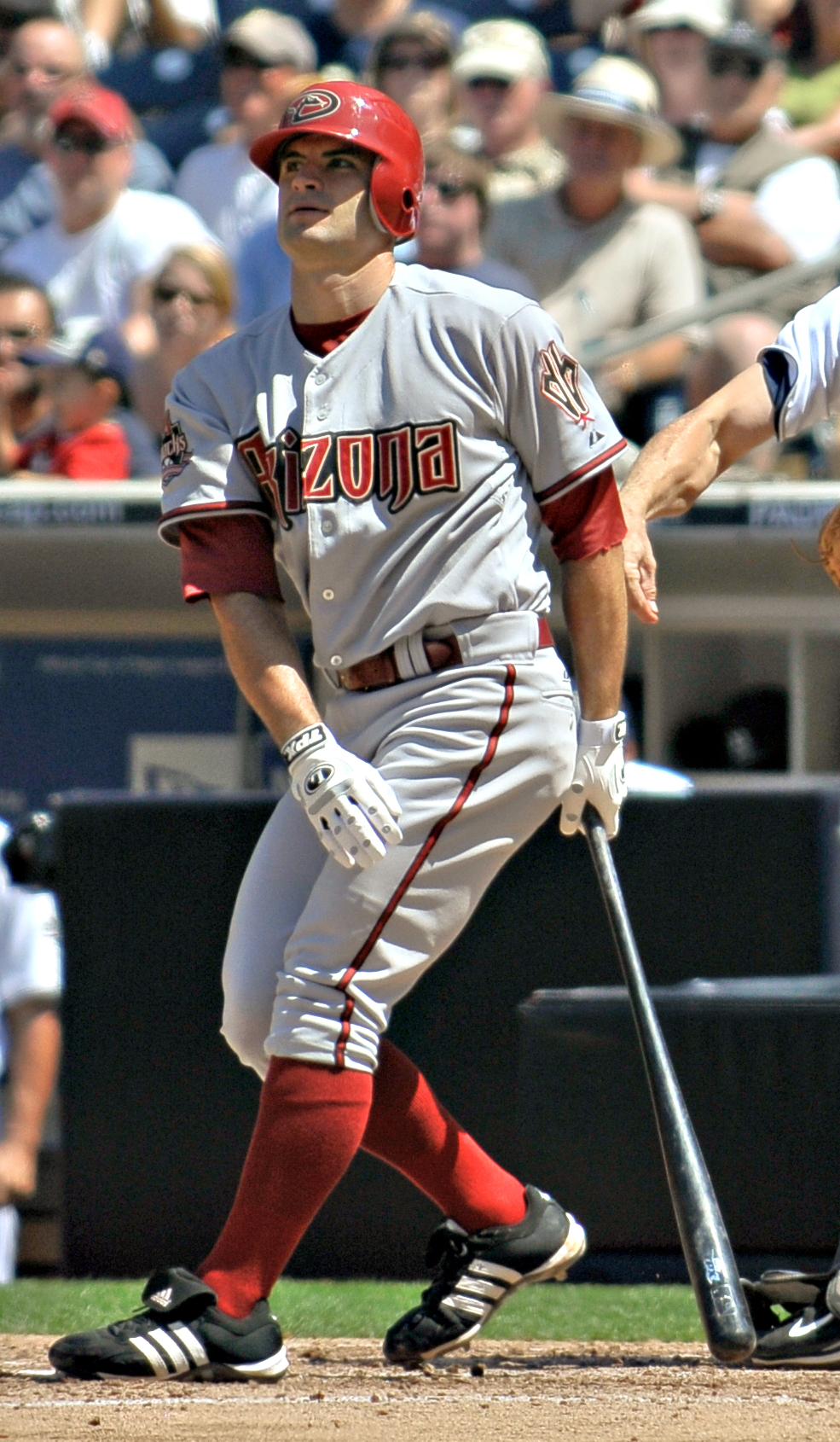
- Burke with the Arizona Diamondbacks
- Second baseman / Outfielder
- Born: March 11, 1980 (age 46); Louisville, Kentucky, U.S.
- Batted: Right Threw: Right

MLB debut
- July 4, 2004, for the Houston Astros

Last MLB appearance
- June 7, 2009, for the San Diego Padres

MLB statistics
- Batting average: .239
- Home runs: 23
- Runs batted in: 111
- Stats at Baseball Reference

Teams
- Houston Astros (2004–2007); Arizona Diamondbacks (2008); San Diego Padres (2009)

Christopher Alan Burke (born March 11, 1980) is an American former Major League Baseball player, playing primarily for the Houston Astros, though he also played for the Arizona Diamondbacks and San Diego Padres. He is best remembered for hitting a series-ending walk-off home run in Game 4 of the 2005 National League Division Series.

== College ==
Burke played baseball at St. Albert the Great Elementary School and St. Xavier High School in Louisville, Kentucky, and the University of Tennessee, where he was named to three All-America teams. In 1999, Burke was selected as a Freshman 2nd team All-American at second base. In 2000, in addition to being named a 3rd team All-American, he was named to the All-Southeastern Conference team at second base.

In 2001, his junior year, Burke moved to shortstop and helped the Volunteers make an appearance in the College World Series by hitting .435 with 20 home runs and 49 stolen bases, being named to the CWS all-tournament team. He was a 1st team All-American shortstop, and was the unanimous choice as the 2001 SEC Player of the Year. He was also a finalist for the 2001 Rotary Smith Award.

== Professional career ==
Burke was the Houston Astros' first-round pick in the 2001 MLB draft as the 10th overall selection. In 2003, Burke was named Round Rock's Team MVP and a Texas League All-Star after batting .301 with 3 home runs and 41 RBI. He played on the USA Baseball Olympic qualifying team and was named the starting second baseman for the All-Star Futures Game.

In 2004, Burke was named the Pacific Coast League Rookie of the Year and the New Orleans Zephyrs' team MVP in addition to being named to the All-PCL and AAA All-Star teams after hitting .315 with 16 home runs, 52 RBI, and 37 steals. He played in the All-Star Futures Game for the second straight year.

=== Houston Astros ===
Burke made his MLB debut on July 4, 2004, against the Texas Rangers. He recorded his first Major League hit with a pinch-hit single on September 14 against the St. Louis Cardinals.

Entering 2005, Burke was rated as the top prospect in the Astros system by Baseball America. He made the Astros' Opening Day roster, but was optioned to Round Rock on May 6. He batted .311 there before being recalled to the Astros on June 1. He finished the season batting .248 with 5 home runs and 26 RBI in 108 games. Burke had an 11-game hitting streak from June 27 to July 6, tied for the third-longest streak among NL rookies in 2005 and the longest for an Astros rookie since Julio Lugo's 14-game streak in 2000.

Burke hit the series-winning walk-off home run off Joey Devine of the Atlanta Braves' that ended Game 4 of the 2005 National League Division Series (NLDS). The game, which lasted 18 innings, took 5 hours and 50 minutes to play, and stands as the second-longest playoff game in Major League postseason history.

Burke began the 2007 season on the Astros' Opening Day roster, but was optioned to Round Rock on May 11. Burke did not hit particularly well (.242 BA) there, but with outfielder Jason Lane struggling, Burke was recalled on June 3.

=== Arizona Diamondbacks ===
On December 14, 2007, he was traded to the Arizona Diamondbacks along with Chad Qualls and Juan Gutiérrez for José Valverde.

Burke was non-tendered following the 2008 season and became a free agent.

=== San Diego Padres ===
On January 13, 2009, he signed a minor league contract with the San Diego Padres. After not making the team in Spring Training, Burke was traded to the Seattle Mariners for cash considerations. However, on April 21, 2009, Burke was traded back to the Padres and was added to the Major League roster.

=== Atlanta Braves ===
On June 19, 2009, Burke signed a minor-league contract with the Atlanta Braves.

=== Cincinnati Reds ===
Burke signed a minor league contract on December 10, 2009, with the Cincinnati Reds. In the first week of Spring Training, Burke broke his finger.

=== Post-playing career ===
After Burke's alma mater The University of Tennessee relieved Todd Raleigh of his duties as the Vols baseball coach in May 2011, Burke's name had been at the top of the Tennessee wish list to become the next Head Coach of the Tennessee baseball program. He interviewed for the job, but the school decided to hire Dave Serrano from Cal State Fullerton.

== Broadcasting career ==
ESPN hired Burke in 2012 as a color analyst for college baseball coverage on ESPN and SEC Network.

== See also ==
- List of walk-off home runs in the postseason and All-Star Game
- Tennessee Volunteers baseball statistical leaders
