= 2019 Tennessee Volunteers baseball team =

American college baseball season

2019 Tennessee Volunteers baseball

Chapel Hill Regional, 2–2
- Conference: Southeastern Conference
- Eastern Division

Ranking
- Coaches: No. 24
- Record: 40–21 (14–16 SEC)
- Head coach: Tony Vitello (2nd season)
- Assistant coaches: Frank Anderson; Josh Elander
- Home stadium: Lindsey Nelson Stadium

2019 Southeastern Conference baseball standings
| | Conf. | | | | | | Overall |
| Team | W | | L | | T | PCT | W | | L | | T | PCT |
|---|---|---|---|---|---|---|---|---|---|---|---|---|
Eastern
| No. 1 Vanderbilt ^{x}‍†‍‡‍^{y} | 23 | – | 7 | – | 0 | .767 | 58 | – | 12 | – | 0 | .829 |
| No. 18 Georgia ‍‍‍^{y} | 21 | – | 9 | – | 0 | .700 | 46 | – | 17 | – | 0 | .730 |
| Tennessee ‍‍‍^{y} | 14 | – | 16 | – | 0 | .467 | 40 | – | 21 | – | 0 | .656 |
| Missouri ‍‍‍ | 13 | – | 16 | – | 1 | .450 | 34 | – | 22 | – | 1 | .605 |
| Florida ‍‍‍^{y} | 13 | – | 17 | – | 0 | .433 | 34 | – | 26 | – | 0 | .567 |
| South Carolina ‍‍‍ | 8 | – | 22 | – | 0 | .267 | 28 | – | 28 | – | 0 | .500 |
| Kentucky ‍‍‍ | 7 | – | 23 | – | 0 | .233 | 26 | – | 29 | – | 0 | .473 |
Western
| No. 5 Mississippi State ^{x}‍‍‍^{y} | 20 | – | 10 | – | 0 | .667 | 52 | – | 15 | – | 0 | .776 |
| No. 6 Arkansas ^{x}‍‍‍^{y} | 20 | – | 10 | – | 0 | .667 | 46 | – | 20 | – | 0 | .697 |
| No. 14 LSU ‍‍‍^{y} | 17 | – | 13 | – | 0 | .567 | 40 | – | 26 | – | 0 | .606 |
| No. 20 Texas A&M ‍‍‍^{y} | 16 | – | 13 | – | 1 | .550 | 39 | – | 23 | – | 1 | .627 |
| No. 12 Ole Miss ‍‍‍^{y} | 16 | – | 14 | – | 0 | .533 | 41 | – | 27 | – | 0 | .603 |
| No. 9 Auburn ‍‍‍^{y} | 14 | – | 16 | – | 0 | .467 | 38 | – | 28 | – | 0 | .576 |
| Alabama ‍‍‍ | 7 | – | 23 | – | 0 | .233 | 30 | – | 26 | – | 0 | .536 |
x – Division champion † – Conference champion ‡ – Tournament champion y – Invited to the NCAA tournament As of June 25, 2019; Rankings from D1Baseball

The 2019 Tennessee Volunteers baseball team represented the University of Tennessee in the 2019 NCAA Division I baseball season. The Volunteers played their home games at Lindsey Nelson Stadium.

== Preseason ==
=== SEC media poll ===
The SEC media poll was released on February 7, 2019, with the Volunteers predicted to finish in fifth place in the Eastern Division.

Media poll (East)
| Predicted finish | Team | Votes (1st place) |
| 1 | Vanderbilt | 87 (9) |
| 2 | Florida | 81 (4) |
| 3 | Georgia | 68 (1) |
| 4 | South Carolina | 53 |
| 5 | Tennessee | 40 |
| 6 | Kentucky | 30 |
| 7 | Missouri | 26 |

== Personnel ==
=== Coaching staff ===
2019 Tennessee Volunteers coaching staff
- Tony Vitello – Head Coach – 2nd year
- Frank Anderson – Assistant Coach – 2nd year
- Josh Elander – Assistant Coach/Recruiting Coordinator – 2nd year
- Ross Kivett – Assistant Coach/Camp Coordinator – 2nd year
- J. P. Arencibia – Student Assistant Coach – 2nd year
- Quentin Eberhardt – Strength & Conditioning Coach – 2nd year
- Chad Zurcher – Coordinator of Baseball Operations – 4th year
- Todd Helton – Director of Player Development – 3rd year
- Sean McCann – Video Coordinator – 2nd year

== Roster ==
2019 Tennessee Volunteers roster
| Pitchers: 11 – Will Heflin – Junior – Morristown, TN; 15 – Will Neely – Senior – Knoxville, TN; 16 – Camden Sewell – Freshman – Cleveland, TN; 18 – Chase Wallace – Sophomore – Sevierville, TN; 20 – Tanner Kohlhepp – Freshman – Eau Claire, WI; 25 – Zach Linginfelter – Junior – Sevierville, TN; 27 – Garrett Stallings – Junior – Chesapeake, VA; 28 – Elijah Pleasants – Freshman – Clarksville, TN; 29 – Daniel Vasquez – (redshirt) Junior – El Cajon, CA; 30 – Andrew Schultz – Junior – Alpharetta, GA; 31 – Caleb Pearson – Freshman – Brentwood, TN; 32 – Sean Hunley – Sophomore – Mount Juliet, TN; 33 – Joshua Plummer – Sophomore – Mechanicsville, VA; 34 – Garrett Crochet – Sophomore – Ocean Springs, MS; 37 – Richard Jackson – (redshirt) Senior – Atlanta, GA; 41 – Bennett Shoptaw – Freshman – Little Rock, AR; 43 – Hunter Dreves – Freshman – Fort Thomas, KY; 44 – Alex Harper-Cook – (redshirt) Junior – Maryville, TN; 45 – Chase Silseth – Freshman – Farmington, NM; 46 – Redmond Walsh – (redshirt) Sophomore – Louisville, TN | Catchers: 17 – Connor Pavolony – Freshman – Woodstock, GA; 19 – Landon Gray – Junior – Granbury, TX; 36 – Matthew Ellis – Freshman – Waddy, KY; Infielders: 7 – Jake Rucker – Freshman – Greenbrier, TN; 12 – Ricky Martinez – Junior – Pflugerville, TX; 13 – Andre Lipcius – Junior – Williamsburg, VA; 14 – Austin Knight – Freshman – Jacksonville, FL; 21 – Trey Lipscomb – Freshman – Frederick, MD; 35 – Nico Mascia – (redshirt) Junior – Knoxville, TN; 40 – Luc Lipcius – Junior – Williamsburg, VA; 42 – Max Ferguson – Freshman – Atlantic Beach, FL; Utility: 10 – Pete Derkay – Junior – Acworth, GA | Outfielders: 1 – Alerick Soularie – Sophomore – Houston, TX; 4 – Jay Charleston – Junior – Longwood, FL; 5 – Zach Daniels – Sophomore – Stockbridge, GA; 6 – Evan Russell – Sophomore – Lexington, TN; 8 – Christian Scott – Freshman – Clarksville, TN; 9 – Justin Ammons – Junior – Memphis, TN; 38 – Dalton Reese – Freshman – Collierville, TN; 39 – Paul Komistek – Freshman – Knoxville, TN; 51 – Ethan Barker – Junior – Midland, TX |

== Schedule and results ==
Legend
| | Tennessee win |
| | Tennessee loss |
| | Postponement |
| **Bold** | Tennessee team member |

2019 Tennessee Volunteers baseball game log
Regular season (38–18)

February (9–0)
| Date | Opponent | Rank | Site/stadium | Score | Win | Loss | Save | TV | Attendance | Overall record | SEC record |
|---|---|---|---|---|---|---|---|---|---|---|---|
| February 15 | Appalachian State | | Lindsey Nelson Stadium Knoxville, TN | 6–0 | **Stallings** (1–0) | Sprinkle (0–1) | | SECN+ | 1,297 | 1–0 | |
| February 16 | Appalachian State | | Lindsey Nelson Stadium | 2–0 | **Linginfelter** (1–0) | Tuthill (0–1) | **Crochet** (1) | SECN+ | 1,523 | 2–0 | |
| February 17 | Appalachian State | | Lindsey Nelson Stadium | 3–0 | **Neely** (1–0) | Kepley (0–1) | **Schultz** (1) | SECN+ | 1,118 | 3–0 | |
| February 19 | Northern Kentucky | | Lindsey Nelson Stadium | 18–0 | **Hunley** (1–0) | Richardson (0–1) | | SECN+ | 945 | 4–0 | |
| February 22 | Indiana | | Lindsey Nelson Stadium | 5–1 | **Stallings** (2–0) | Milto (1–1) | **Walsh** (1) | SECN+ | 1,068 | 5–0 | |
| February 23 | Indiana | | Lindsey Nelson Stadium | 11–0 | **Linginfelter** (2–0) | Gordon (0–2) | | SECN+ | 981 | 6–0 | |
| February 24 | Indiana | | Lindsey Nelson Stadium | 5–3 | **Crochet** (1–0) | Sommer (1–1) | **Schultz** (2) | SECN+ | 1,767 | 7–0 | |
| February 26 | Liberty | | Lindsey Nelson Stadium | 7–1 | **Hunley** (2–0) | Meyer (1–2) | | | 1,398 | 8–0 | |
| February 27 | Middle Tennessee | | Lindsey Nelson Stadium | 2–0 | **Sewell** (1–0) | Keenan (1–1) | **Walsh** (2) | SECN+ | 1,487 | 9–0 | |

March (12–8)
| Date | Opponent | Rank | Site/stadium | Score | Win | Loss | Save | TV | Attendance | Overall record | SEC record |
|---|---|---|---|---|---|---|---|---|---|---|---|
| March 1 | vs. Louisiana–Monroe | | Blue Wahoos Stadium; Pensacola, FL | 7–2 | **Stallings** (3–0) | Barton (1–1) | **Crochet** (2) | | 557 | 10–0 | |
| March 2 (1) | vs. North Florida | | Blue Wahoos Stadium | 10–2 | **Linginfelter** (3–0) | Reitz (0–1) | | | 259 | 11–0 | |
| March 2 (2) | vs. Western Kentucky | | Blue Wahoos Stadium | 6–3^{7} | **Neely** (2–0) | Calvert (0–2) | **Walsh** (3) | | 389 | 12–0 | |
| March 5 | vs. Troy | No. 25 | Hoover Metropolitan Stadium; Hoover, AL | 11–2 | **Hunley** (3–0) | Goodwin (0–2) | | | 1,032 | 13–0 | |
| March 8 | Fresno State | No. 25 | Lindsey Nelson Stadium | 8–3 | **Stallings** (4–0) | Jensen (1–2) | | SECN+ | 933 | 14–0 | |
| March 9 | Fresno State | No. 25 | Lindsey Nelson Stadium | **Suspended in the 8th inning. Game completed on March 10.** | | | | | | | |
| March 10 (1) | Fresno State | No. 25 | Lindsey Nelson Stadium | 13–9 | **Linginfelter** (4–0) | Mitchell (1–2) | **Crochet** (2) | SECN+ | 1,228 | 15–0 | |
| March 10 (2) | Fresno State | No. 25 | Lindsey Nelson Stadium | 7–10 | Moore (3–0) | **Neely** (2–1) | Arias (4) | SECN+ | 2,323 | 15–1 | |
| March 12 | UNC Asheville | No. 23 | Lindsey Nelson Stadium | 8–4 | **Sewell** (2–0) | Harris (0–2) | | SECN+ | 1,687 | 16–1 | |
| March 13 | UNC Asheville | No. 23 | Lindsey Nelson Stadium | 7–2 | **Heflin** (1–0) | Sondock (0–1) | | SECN+ | 1,214 | 17–1 | |
| March 15 | at No. 18 Auburn | No. 23 | Plainsman Park; Auburn, AL | 0–2 | Anderson (3–0) | **Stallings** (4–1) | Greenhill (3) | SECN+ | 3,060 | 17–2 | 0–1 |
| March 16 | at No. 18 Auburn | No. 23 | Plainsman Park | 2–5 | Fuller (1–0) | **Linginfelter** (4–1) | | SECN | 3,513 | 17–3 | 0–2 |
| March 17 | at No. 18 Auburn | No. 23 | Plainsman Park | 3–5 | Gray (1–1) | **Crochet** (1–1) | | SECN+ | 3,401 | 17–4 | 0–3 |
| March 19 | at East Tennessee State | | Thomas Stadium; Johnson City, TN | 5–1 | **Heflin** (2–0) | Montagna (1–1) | **Jackson** (1) | | 1,715 | 18–4 | |
| March 22 | South Carolina | | Lindsey Nelson Stadium | 15–5 | **Stallings** (5–1) | Sweatt (1–1) | | SECN+ | 1,807 | 19–4 | 1–3 |
| March 23 | South Carolina | | Lindsey Nelson Stadium | 2–3 | Tringali (1–0) | **Linginfelter** (4–2) | Kerry (3) | SECN+ | 2,662 | 19–5 | 1–4 |
| March 24 | South Carolina | | Lindsey Nelson Stadium | 6–3 | **Crochet** (2–1) | Hinson | | SECN+ | 1,918 | 20–5 | 2–4 |
| March 26 | East Tennessee State | | Lindsey Nelson Stadium | 5–6 | Oglesby (1–0) | **Silseth** (0–1) | Giambalvo (4) | SECN+ | 1,619 | 20–6 | |
| March 29 | at No. 6 Vanderbilt | | Hawkins Field; Nashville, TN | 2–4 | Fellows (6–0) | **Stallings** (5–2) | Brown (6) | SECN+ | 3,626 | 20–7 | 2–5 |
| March 30 | at No. 6 Vanderbilt | | Hawkins Field | 4–10 | Raby (5–0) | **Linginfelter** (4–3) | Fisher (2) | SECN | 3,512 | 20–8 | 2–6 |
| March 31 | at No. 6 Vanderbilt | | Hawkins Field | 7–6 | **Crochet** (3–1) | Rocker (2–3) | | SECN | 3,563 | 21–8 | 3–6 |

April (10–6)
| Date | Opponent | Rank | Site/stadium | Score | Win | Loss | Save | TV | Attendance | Overall record | SEC record |
|---|---|---|---|---|---|---|---|---|---|---|---|
| April 2 | Belmont | | Lindsey Nelson Stadium | 6–2 | **Heflin** (3–0) | Matter (0–1) | | SECN | 1,990 | 22–8 | |
| April 5 | No. 8 Mississippi State | | Lindsey Nelson Stadium | 3–6^{11} | Trysten (2–1) | **Crochet** (3–2) | | SECN+ | 2,684 | 22–9 | 3–7 |
| April 6 | No. 8 Mississippi State | | Lindsey Nelson Stadium | 2–1 | **Linginfelter** (5–3) | Peyton (1–2) | **Walsh** (4) | SECN+ | 2,485 | 23–9 | 4–7 |
| April 7 | No. 8 Mississippi State | | Lindsey Nelson Stadium | 5–7 | Keegan (3–1) | **Heflin** (3–1) | Liebelt (3) | SECN+ | 2,416 | 23–10 | 4–8 |
| April 9 | Lipscomb | | Lindsey Nelson Stadium | 11–2 | **Silseth** (1–1) | Steventon (0–1) | | SECN+ | 2,581 | 24–10 | |
| April 11 | No. 2 Georgia | | Lindsey Nelson Stadium | 2–0 | **Schultz** (1–0) | Hancock (6–2) | **Walsh** (5) | SECN | 1,994 | 25–10 | 5–8 |
| April 12 | No. 2 Georgia | | Lindsey Nelson Stadium | 3–0 | **Stallings** (6–2) | Smith (3–2) | | SECN+ | 2,765 | 26–10 | 6–8 |
| April 13 | No. 2 Georgia | | Lindsey Nelson Stadium | 1–7 | Locey (6–0) | **Linginfelter** (5–4) | Kristofak (3) | SECN+ | 3,311 | 26–11 | 6–9 |
| April 16 | Morehead State | No. 25 | Lindsey Nelson Stadium | 3–1 | **Sewell** (3–0) | Garbrick (2–4) | **Walsh** (6) | SECN+ | 1,537 | 27–11 | |
| April 18 | at Kentucky | No. 25 | Kentucky Proud Park; Lexington, KY | 4–2 | **Schultz** (2–0) | Harper (3–2) | **Walsh** (7) | SECN+ | 3,463 | 28–11 | 7–9 |
| April 19 | at Kentucky | No. 25 | Kentucky Proud Park | 16–1 | **Stallings** (7–2) | Hazelwood (2–3) | | SECN+ | 3,717 | 29–11 | 8–9 |
| April 20 | at Kentucky | No. 25 | Kentucky Proud Park | 8–2 | **Linginfelter** (6–4) | Thompson (3–1) | | SECN+ | 3,257 | 30–11 | 9–9 |
| April 23 | Gardner–Webb | No. 20 | Lindsey Nelson Stadium | 5–0 | **Sewell** (4–0) | Davis (2–1) | | SECN+ | 1,720 | 31–11 | |
| April 26 | at No. 8 Arkansas | No. 20 | Baum–Walker Stadium; Fayetteville, AR | 9–11 | Kopps (4–3) | **Schultz** (2–1) | Cronin (9) | SECN+ | 11,787 | 31–12 | 9–10 |
| April 27 | at No. 8 Arkansas | No. 20 | Baum–Walker Stadium | 3–15 | Wicklander (4–1) | Stallings (7–3) | None | SECN+ | 11,594 | 31–13 | 9–11 |
| April 28 | at No. 8 Arkansas | No. 20 | Baum–Walker Stadium | 3–4^{10} | Trest (1–1) | Walsh (0–1) | None | SECN | 9,419 | 31–14 | 9–12 |

May (7–4)
| Date | Opponent | Rank | Site/stadium | Score | Win | Loss | Save | TV | Attendance | Overall record | SEC record |
|---|---|---|---|---|---|---|---|---|---|---|---|
| May 3 | No. 24 Missouri | | Lindsey Nelson Stadium | 11–5 | **Hunley** (4–0) | Ash (2–1) | **Walsh** (8) | SECN+ | 2,385 | 32–14 | 10–12 |
| May 4 | No. 24 Missouri | | Lindsey Nelson Stadium | 2–6 | Bedell (3–1) | **Crochet** (3–3) | Dulle (4) | SECN | 1,844 | 32–15 | 10–13 |
| May 5 | No. 24 Missouri | | Lindsey Nelson Stadium | 8–10 | Sikkema (6–3) | **Sewell** (4–1) | | SECN+ | 2,243 | 32–16 | 10–14 |
| May 7 | Austin Peay | | Lindsey Nelson Stadium | 9–4 | **Heflin** (4–1) | Martinez (0–2) | | SECN+ | 1,702 | 33–16 | |
| May 10 | at Florida | | Alfred A. McKethan Stadium; Gainesville, FL | 9–10 | Crisp (4–2) | **Walsh** (0–2) | | SECN+ | 3,542 | 33–17 | 10–15 |
| May 11 | at Florida | | Alfred A. McKethan Stadium | 8–7 | **Crochet** (4–3) | Specht (1–1) | **Sewell** (1) | SECN | 3,659 | 34–17 | 11–15 |
| May 12 | at Florida | | Alfred A. McKethan Stadium | 5–4 | **Jackson** (1–0) | Crisp (4–3) | **Hunley** (1) | SECN+ | 3,265 | 35–17 | 12–15 |
| May 14 | Tennessee Tech | | Lindsey Nelson Stadium | 15–10 | **Schultz** (3–1) | Saliba (2–2) | **Walsh** (9) | SECN+ | 2,002 | 36–17 | |
| May 16 | No. 15 Ole Miss | | Lindsey Nelson Stadium | 7–0 | **Stallings** (8–3) | Ethridge (5–6) | | SECN | 2,310 | 37–17 | 13–15 |
| May 17 | No. 15 Ole Miss | | Lindsey Nelson Stadium | 7–5 | **Walsh** (1–2) | Miller (4–2) | | SECN+ | 2,866 | 38–17 | 14–15 |
| May 18 | No. 15 Ole Miss | | Lindsey Nelson Stadium | 4–5 | Hoglund (2–2) | **Linginfelter** (6–5) | Olenek (1) | SECN+ | 2,718 | 38–18 | 14–16 |

Postseason (2–3)

SEC Tournament (0–1)
| Date | Opponent | Seed/Rank | Site/stadium | Score | Win | Loss | Save | TV | Attendance | Overall record | SECT Record |
|---|---|---|---|---|---|---|---|---|---|---|---|
| May 21 | vs. (8) Auburn | (9) | Hoover Metropolitan Stadium; Hoover, AL | 3–5 | Horn (3–0) | **Stallings** (8–4) | Greenhill (10) | SECN | | 38–19 | 0–1 |

NCAA Division I baseball tournament – Chapel Hill Regional (2–2)
| Date | Opponent | Seed | Site/stadium | Score | Win | Loss | Save | TV | Attendance | Overall record | NCAAT record |
|---|---|---|---|---|---|---|---|---|---|---|---|
| May 31 | vs. (3) Liberty | (2) | Boshamer Stadium; Chapel Hill, NC | 1–6 | Meyer (6–4) | **Stallings** (8–5) | | ESPN3 | 2,239 | 38–20 | 0–1 |
| June 1 | vs. (4) UNC Wilmington | (2) | Boshamer Stadium | 10–3 | **Crochet** (5–3) | Roupp (6–3) | | SECN | 2,245 | 39–20 | 1–1 |
| June 2 | vs. (3) Liberty | (2) | Boshamer Stadium | 6–5^{10} | **Walsh** (2–2) | Brabrand (4–3) | | ESPN3 | 2,081 | 40–20 | 2–1 |
| June 2 | at (1) North Carolina | (2) | Boshamer Stadium | 2–5 | Bergner (6–1) | **Linginfelter** (6–6) | Lancellotti (3) | ESPN3 | 3,507 | 40–21 | 2–2 |

Schedule source:

*Rankings are based on the team's current ranking in the D1Baseball poll.

== Chapel Hill Regional ==
Chapel Hill Regional Teams
| (1) North Carolina Tar Heels | (2) Tennessee Volunteers | (3) Liberty Flames | (4) UNC Wilmington Seahawks |

First Round
1 | North Carolina | 7
4 | UNC Wilmington | 6
3 | Liberty | 6
2 | Tennessee | 1
Lower round 1
4 | UNC Wilmington | 3
2 | Tennessee | 10

Semi-Finals
1 | North Carolina | 16
3 | Liberty | 1
Lower final
2 | Tennessee | 6
3 | Liberty | 5^{10}

Finals
1 | North Carolina | 5
2 | Tennessee | 2

== Record vs. conference opponents ==
Last two do not qualify for conf. tourn. Blank are not scheduled. Blue are home games, otherwise away.

2019 SEC baseball records Source: 2019 SEC baseball game results
| Team | W–L | ALA | ARK | AUB | FLA | UGA | KEN | LSU | MSU | MIZZ | MISS | SCAR | TENN | TAMU | VAN | Team | Div | SR | SW |
|---|---|---|---|---|---|---|---|---|---|---|---|---|---|---|---|---|---|---|---|
| ALA | 7–23 | | 1–2 | 1–2 | 0–3 | 0–3 | . | 1–2 | 0–3 | . | 1–2 | 2–1 | . | 1–2 | 0–3 | ALA | W7 | 1–9 | 0–4 |
| ARK | 20–10 | 2–1 | | 2–1 | . | . | 2–1 | 3–0 | 2–1 | 3–0 | 1–2 | . | 3–0 | 1–2 | 1–2 | ARK | W1 | 7–3 | 3–0 |
| AUB | 14–16 | 2–1 | 1–2 | | . | 1–2 | . | 1–2 | 1–2 | . | 2–1 | 2–1 | 3–0 | 1–2 | 0–3 | AUB | W6 | 4–6 | 1–1 |
| FLA | 13–17 | 3–0 | . | . | | 0–3 | 2–1 | 1–2 | 1–2 | 3–0 | 0–3 | 2–1 | 1–2 | . | 0–3 | FLA | E5 | 4–6 | 2–3 |
| UGA | 21–9 | 3–0 | . | 2–1 | 3–0 | | 2–1 | 2–1 | 0–3 | 3–0 | . | 3–0 | 1–2 | . | 2–1 | UGA | E2 | 8–2 | 4–1 |
| KEN | 7–23 | . | 1–2 | . | 1–2 | 1–2 | | 0–3 | . | 1–2 | 2–1 | 1–2 | 0–3 | 0–3 | 0–3 | KEN | E7 | 1–9 | 0–4 |
| LSU | 17–13 | 2–1 | 0–3 | 2–1 | 2–1 | 1–2 | 3–0 | | 3–0 | 1–2 | 1–2 | . | . | 2–1 | . | LSU | W3 | 6–4 | 2–1 |
| MSU | 20–10 | 3–0 | 1–2 | 2–1 | 2–1 | 3–0 | . | 0–3 | | . | 3–0 | 2–1 | 2–1 | 2–1 | . | MSU | W2 | 8–2 | 3–1 |
| MIZZ | 13–16 | . | 0–3 | . | 0–3 | 0–3 | 2–1 | 2–1 | . | | 2–1 | 3–0 | 2–1 | 1–1 | 1–2 | MIZZ | E4 | 5–4 | 1–3 |
| MISS | 16–14 | 2–1 | 2–1 | 1–2 | 3–0 | . | 1–2 | 2–1 | 0–3 | 1–2 | | . | 1–2 | 3–0 | . | MISS | W5 | 5–5 | 2–1 |
| SCAR | 8–22 | 1–2 | . | 1–2 | 1–2 | 0–3 | 2–1 | . | 1–2 | 0–3 | . | | 1–2 | 1–2 | 0–3 | SCAR | E6 | 1–9 | 0–3 |
| TENN | 14–16 | . | 0–3 | 0–3 | 2–1 | 2–1 | 3–0 | . | 1–2 | 1–2 | 2–1 | 2–1 | | . | 1–2 | TENN | E3 | 5–5 | 1–2 |
| TAMU | 16–13 | 2–1 | 2–1 | 2–1 | . | . | 3–0 | 1–2 | 1–2 | 1–1 | 0–3 | 2–1 | . | | 2–1 | TAMU | W4 | 6–3 | 1–1 |
| VAN | 23–7 | 3–0 | 2–1 | 3–0 | 3–0 | 1–2 | 3–0 | . | . | 2–1 | . | 3–0 | 2–1 | 1–2 | | VAN | E1 | 8–2 | 5–0 |
| Team | W–L | ALA | ARK | AUB | FLA | UGA | KEN | LSU | MSU | MIZZ | MISS | SCAR | TENN | TAMU | VAN | Team | Div | SR | SW |

Updated for entire regular season. Missouri at Texas A&M series had one tie game.

== Rankings ==
Ranking movements Legend: ██ Increase in ranking ██ Decrease in ranking — = Not ranked
| | Week | | | | | | | | | | | | | | | | | | | |
| Poll | Pre | 1 | 2 | 3 | 4 | 5 | 6 | 7 | 8 | 9 | 10 | 11 | 12 | 13 | 14 | 15 | 16 | 17 | 18 | Final |
|---|---|---|---|---|---|---|---|---|---|---|---|---|---|---|---|---|---|---|---|---|
| Coaches' | — | —* | * | 21 | 21 | 22 | 23 | — | — | 22 | 18 | 23 | 24 | — | | | | | | |
| Baseball America | — | — | — | — | 25 | — | — | — | — | — | 21 | — | — | — | | | | | | |
| Collegiate Baseball^ | — | — | — | 24 | 22 | — | — | — | — | — | — | — | — | — | | | | | | |
| NCBWA† | — | — | 27 | 22 | 23 | 27 | 28 | 28 | 29 | 22 | 21 | 24 | 27 | 23 | | | | | | |
| D1Baseball | — | — | — | 25 | 23 | — | — | — | — | 25 | 20 | — | — | — | | | | | | |

^ Collegiate Baseball ranked 40 teams in their preseason poll, but only ranked 30 teams weekly during the season.
† NCBWA ranks 30 teams in their preseason poll, but only ranks 25 teams weekly during the season.
* A new poll was not released for this week, so for comparison purposes, the previous week's ranking is inserted in this week's slot.

== 2019 MLB draft ==
| Player | Position | Round | Overall | MLB team |
|---|---|---|---|---|
| Andre Lipcius | 3B | 3 | 83 | Detroit Tigers |
| Garrett Stallings | RHP | 5 | 151 | Los Angeles Angels |
| Andrew Schultz | RHP | 6 | 180 | Philadelphia Phillies |
| Zach Linginfelter | RHP | 9 | 271 | Los Angeles Angels |
| Ricky Martinez | SS | 18 | 542 | Arizona Diamondbacks |
| Jay Charleston | OF | 26 | 769 | Kansas City Royals |
