= David Macias =

American baseball player (born 1986)

San Diego Padres – No. 46
- Infielder/Outfielder
- Born: March 7, 1986 (age 40); The Woodlands, Texas, U.S.
- Bats: Both Throws: Right

Teams
- As coach: San Diego Padres (2022–present)

David Gustavo Macias (born March 7, 1986) is an American professional baseball coach who currently serves as the first base coach for the San Diego Padres of Major League Baseball (MLB). He was drafted by the Chicago Cubs in the 19th round of the 2008 Major League Baseball draft.

== Career ==
Macias graduated from The Woodlands High School in The Woodlands, Texas. He attended Vanderbilt University, where he played college baseball for the Vanderbilt Commodores. After leading the team in batting average in his senior year, the Chicago Cubs selected Macias in the 19th round of the 2008 MLB draft. Macias made his professional debut with the Low-A Boise Hawks, hitting .228/.316/.288 in 54 games. In 2009, Macias split the year between the Single-A Peoria Chiefs and Triple-A Iowa Cubs, hitting a cumulative .241/.313/.289 with 32 RBI and his first professional home run in 114 combined games. The following season, Macias played for the High-A Daytona Cubs and the Double-A Tennessee Smokies, posting a slash of .224/.277/.283 with 2 home runs and 34 RBI in 106 games between the two teams. In 2011, Macias played for three Cubs affiliates: Peoria, Daytona, and Tennessee. In 83 games between the three clubs, he slashed .247/.327/.305 with 2 home runs and 24 RBI. On April 25, 2012, Macias was released by the Cubs organization.

== Post-playing career ==
After his playing career, Macias coached for Vanderbilt and East Carolina University. In 2017, Macias was the manager of the Clinton LumberKings. He joined the San Diego Padres as first base coach on December 17, 2021.
