= 2019 Vanderbilt Commodores baseball team =

American college baseball season

2019 Vanderbilt Commodores baseball

College World Series National Champions Nashville Super Regional champions Nashville Regional champions SEC tournament champions SEC regular season champions SEC Eastern Division champions
- Conference: Southeastern Conference
- Eastern Division

Ranking
- Coaches: No. 1
- CB: No. 1
- Record: 59–12 (23–7 SEC)
- Head coach: Tim Corbin (17th season)
- Hitting coach: Mike Baxter (2nd season)
- Pitching coach: Scott Brown (7th season)
- Home stadium: Hawkins Field

2019 Southeastern Conference baseball standings
	Conf.						Overall
Team	W		L		T	PCT	W		L		T	PCT
Eastern
No. 1 Vanderbilt ^{x}‍†‍‡‍^{y}	23	–	7	–	0	.767	58	–	12	–	0	.829
No. 18 Georgia ‍‍‍^{y}	21	–	9	–	0	.700	46	–	17	–	0	.730
Tennessee ‍‍‍^{y}	14	–	16	–	0	.467	40	–	21	–	0	.656
Missouri ‍‍‍	13	–	16	–	1	.450	34	–	22	–	1	.605
Florida ‍‍‍^{y}	13	–	17	–	0	.433	34	–	26	–	0	.567
South Carolina ‍‍‍	8	–	22	–	0	.267	28	–	28	–	0	.500
Kentucky ‍‍‍	7	–	23	–	0	.233	26	–	29	–	0	.473
Western
No. 5 Mississippi State ^{x}‍‍‍^{y}	20	–	10	–	0	.667	52	–	15	–	0	.776
No. 6 Arkansas ^{x}‍‍‍^{y}	20	–	10	–	0	.667	46	–	20	–	0	.697
No. 14 LSU ‍‍‍^{y}	17	–	13	–	0	.567	40	–	26	–	0	.606
No. 20 Texas A&M ‍‍‍^{y}	16	–	13	–	1	.550	39	–	23	–	1	.627
No. 12 Ole Miss ‍‍‍^{y}	16	–	14	–	0	.533	41	–	27	–	0	.603
No. 9 Auburn ‍‍‍^{y}	14	–	16	–	0	.467	38	–	28	–	0	.576
Alabama ‍‍‍	7	–	23	–	0	.233	30	–	26	–	0	.536
x – Division champion † – Conference champion ‡ – Tournament champion y – Invited to the NCAA tournament As of June 25, 2019; Rankings from D1Baseball

The 2019 Vanderbilt Commodores baseball team represented Vanderbilt University in the 2019 NCAA Division I baseball season. The Commodores play their home games at Hawkins Field. The team compiled a record of 59-12 and won the 2019 NCAA National Championship, as well as the SEC regular-season and tournament championships.

== Preseason ==
=== Preseason All-American teams ===
1st Team

- J. J. Bleday – Outfielder (Baseball America)

2nd Team

- Drake Fellows – Starting Pitcher (Collegiate Baseball)
- J. J. Bleday – Outfielder (D1Baseball)
- Austin Martin – Second Baseman (NCBWA)

3rd Team

- Drake Fellows – Starting Pitcher (Perfect Game)
- Stephen Scott – Outfielder (Collegiate Baseball)

=== SEC media poll ===
The SEC media poll was released on February 7, 2019 with the Commodores predicted to win the Eastern Division and the SEC Championship.

Media poll (East)
Predicted finish	Team	Votes (1st place)
1	Vanderbilt	87 (9)
2	Florida	81 (4)
3	Georgia	68 (1)
4	South Carolina	53
5	Tennessee	40
6	Kentucky	30
7	Missouri	26

=== Preseason All-SEC teams ===
1st Team

- Philip Clarke – Catcher
- Austin Martin – Second Baseman

2nd Team

- J.J. Bleday – Outfielder

== Roster ==
2019 Vanderbilt Commodores roster
Pitchers: 9 Makenzie Stills – Freshman; 21 Tyler Brown – Sophomore; 25 Michael Sandborn – (redshirt) Sophomore; 27 Ethan Smith – Freshman; 29 Patrick Raby – Senior; 31 Justin Willis – Sophomore; 32 Hugh Fisher – Sophomore; 33 Erik Kaiser – Sophomore; 34 Zach King – Junior; 35 Jackson Gillis – Junior; 39 Jake Eder – Sophomore; 43 Austin Becker – Freshman; 44 Mason Hickman – Sophomore; 45 Chance Huff – Freshman; 49 AJ Franklin – (redshirt) Junior; 50 Luke Murphy – Freshman; 55 Joe Gobillot – (redshirt) Freshman; 66 Drake Fellows – Junior; 80 Kumar Rocker – Freshman	Catchers: 5 Philip Clarke – Sophomore; 20 Ty Duvall – Junior; Infielders: 2 Harrison Ray – Junior; 6 Tate Kolwyck – Freshman; 10 Ethan Paul – Senior; 22 Julian Infante – Senior; 28 Cam McMillan – Freshman; 30 Sterling Hayes – Freshman; 99 Jayson Gonzalez – Sophomore	Outfielders: 3 Cooper Davis – Sophomore; 8 Isaiah Thomas – Freshman; 11 Matt Hogan – Freshman; 13 Kiambu Fentress – (redshirt) Junior; 17 Walker Grisanti – Senior; 18 Pat DeMarco – Sophomore; 51 J.J. Bleday – Junior; Utility: 12 Dominic Keegan – Freshman; 16 Austin Martin – Sophomore; 19 Stephen Scott – Senior; 36 John Malcom – Freshman; 42 Justyn-Henry Malloy – Freshman

== Schedule and results ==
Legend
	Vanderbilt win
	Vanderbilt loss
	Postponement
**Bold**	Vanderbilt team member

2019 Vanderbilt Commodores baseball game log
Regular season (45–10)

February (6–2)
Date	Opponent	Rank	Site/stadium	Score	Win	Loss	Save	TV	Attendance	Overall record	SEC record
Feb. 15	vs. Virginia	No. 1	Salt River Fields at Talking Stick; Scottsdale, Arizona	**W** 15–9	**Huff** (1–0)	McGarry (0–1)	**King** (1)	MLB Network	1,747	1–0	
Feb. 16	vs. No. 25 Cal State Fullerton	No. 1	Salt River Fields at Talking Stick	**W** 14–9	**Raby** (1–0)	Josten (0–1)		MLB.tv		2–0	
Feb. 17	vs. No. 19 TCU	No. 1	Salt River Fields at Talking Stick	**L** 2–10	Jake Eissler (1–0)	**Rocker** (0–1)		MLB.tv		2–1	
Feb. 20	Evansville	No. 1	Hawkins Field; Nashville, Tennessee	**W** 5–4	**Fisher** (1–0)	David Ellis (0–1)	**Eder** (1)	SECN+	2,665	3–1	
Feb. 23	Pepperdine	No. 1	Hawkins Field	Postponed							
Feb. 24 (9 a.m.)	Pepperdine	No. 1	Hawkins Field	**W** 6–3	**Fellows** (1–0)	Pendergast (1–1)	**Hickman** (1)	SECN+	2,837	4–1	
Feb. 24 (12:30 p.m.)	Pepperdine	No. 1	Hawkins Field	**W** 6–2	**Rockers** (1–1)	Lucas (0–1)		SECN+		5–1	
Feb. 26	Southeast Missouri State	No. 1	Hawkins Field	**W** 11–3	**Smith** (1–0)	Sachse (1–1)		SECN+	2,700	6–1	
Feb. 27	Austin Peay	No. 1	Hawkins Field	**L** 6–7^{10}	Newberg ((1–2)	**Gillis** (0–1)		SECN+	2,726	6–2	

March (16–4)
Date	Opponent	Rank	Site/stadium	Score	Win	Loss	Save	TV	Attendance	Overall record	SEC record
Mar. 1	Dayton	No. 1	Hawkins Field	**W** 11–3	**Fellows** (2–0)	Wolfe (1–2)	**Hickman** (2)	SECN+	2,745	7–2	
Mar. 2	Dayton	No. 1	Hawkins Field	**W** 5–1	**Raby** (2–0)	Ernst (0–2)	**Brown** (1)	SECN+	2,819	8–2	
Mar. 3	Dayton	No. 1	Hawkins Field	**W** 2–0	**Smith** (2–0)	Pletka (0–2)	**Eder** (2)	SECN+		9–2	
Mar. 5	Davidson	No. 1	Hawkins Field	**W** 24–2	**Huff** (2–0)	Hely (0–1)	**Becker** (1)	SECN+	2,667	10–2	
Mar. 6	East Tennessee State	No. 1	Hawkins Field	**W** 12–4	**Gillis** (1–1)	Kirby (0–1)		SECN+	2,665	11–2	
Mar. 8	Illinois State	No. 1	Hawkins Field	**W** 10–4	**Fellows** (3–0)	Headrick (1–1)	**Brown** (2)	SECN+	2,694	12–2	
Mar. 9	Illinois State	No. 1	Hawkins Field	**W** 9–1	**Raby** (3–0)	Lindgren (2–1)	**Fisher** (1)	SECN+	2,866	13–2	
Mar. 10	Illinois State	No. 1	Hawkins Field	**L** 3–7	Colton (2–0)	**King** (0–1)	Gilmore (4)	SECN+		13–3	
Mar. 12	Samford	No. 1	Hawkins Field	**W** 11–6	**Hickman** (1–0)	Hurst (1–1)		SECN+	2,823	14–2	
Mar. 15	at No. 19 Texas A&M	No. 1	Olsen Field at Blue Bell Park; College Station, Texas	**W** 7–4	**Fellows** (4–0)	Doaxkis (3–2)	**Brown** (3)	SECN+	5,774	15–2	1–0
Mar. 16	at No. 19 Texas A&M	No. 1	Olsen Field at Blue Bell Park	**L** 7–8	Kalich (1–0)	**King** (0–2)		SECN+	7,104	15–4	1–1
Mar. 17	at No. 19 Texas A&M	No. 1	Olsen Field at Blue Bell Park	**L** 0–7	Roa (2–1)	**Rocker** (1–2)		SECN+	5,385	15–5	1–2
Mar. 19	vs. Belmont	No. 8	First Tennessee Park; Nashville, Tennessee	**W** 3–0	**Hickman** (2–0)	Hubbell (0–2)	**Brown** (4)		1,032	16–5	
Mar. 21	No. 14 Florida	No. 8	Hawkins Field	**W** 5–0	**Fellows** (5–0)	Mace (4–2)		SECN	3,191	17–5	2–2
Mar. 22	No. 14 Florida	No. 8	Hawkins Field	**W** 15–2	**Raby** (4–0)	Leftwich (4–2)		SECN+	3,626	18–5	3–2
Mar. 23	No. 14 Florida	No. 8	Hawkins Field	**W** 14–4	**Rocker** (2–2)	Dyson (3–1)	**Brown** (5)	SECN+	3,626	19–5	4–2
Mar. 26	vs. Lipscomb	No. 6	First Tennessee Park	**W** 15–1	**Hickman** (3–0)	Elgin (1–1)			1,277	20–5	
Mar. 29	Tennessee	No. 6	Hawkins Field	**W** 4–2	**Fellows** (6–0)	Stallings (5–2)	**Brown** (6)	SECN+	3,626	21–5	5–2
Mar. 30	Tennessee	No. 6	Hawkins Field	**W** 10–4	**Raby** (5–0)	Linginfelter (4–3)	**Fisher** (2)	SECN	3,512	22–5	6–2
Mar. 31	Tennessee	No. 6	Hawkins Field	**L** 6–7	Crochet (3–1)	**Rocker** (2–3)		SECN	3,563	22–6	6–3

April (13–3)
Date	Opponent	Rank	Site/stadium	Score	Win	Loss	Save	TV	Attendance	Overall record	SEC record
April 2	Western Kentucky	No. 5	Hawkins Field	**W** 5–4^{10}	**Smith** (3–0)	Richardson (0–1)		SECN+	2,877	23–6	
April 5	at No. 4 Georgia	No. 5	Foley Field; Athens, Georgia	**W** 3–2^{11}	**Brown** (1–0)	Schunk (1–1)		SECN+	3,188	24–6	7–3
April 6	at No. 4 Georgia	No. 5	Foley Field	**L** 3–8	Smith (3–1)	**Raby** (5–1)		SECN+	3,117	24–7	7–4
April 7	at No. 4 Georgia	No. 5	Foley Field	**L** 1–3	Locey (5–0)	**Rocker** (2–4)	Kristofak (2)	SECN	3,045	24–8	7–5
April 9	at Middle Tennessee	No. 7	Reese Smith Jr. Field; Murfreesboro, TN	**W** 15–3	**Hickman** (4–0)	Zoz (1–2)			2,557	25–8	
April 12	No. 12 Arkansas	No. 7	Hawkins Field	**W** 3–2	**Fellows** (7–0)	Campbell (6–1)	**Brown** (7)	SECN	3,465	26–8	8–5
April 13	No. 12 Arkansas	No. 7	Hawkins Field	**W** 12–2	**Rocker** (3–4)	Noland (0–2)		ESPNU	3,305	27–8	9–5
April 14	No. 12 Arkansas	No. 7	Hawkins Field	**L**	Vermillion (4–0)	**Brown** (1–1)	Denton (1)	SECN+	3,488	27–9	9–6
April 16	Indiana State	No. 6	Hawkins Field	**W** 7–1	**Hickman** (5–0)	Guerrero (1–2)		SECN+	2,810	28–9	
April 19	at Alabama	No. 6	Sewell–Thomas Stadium; Tuscaloosa, Alabama	**W** 7–4	**Fellows** (8–0)	Finnerty (5–5)	**Brown** (8)	SECN+	2,862	29–9	10–6
April 20	at Alabama	No. 6	Sewell–Thomas Stadium	**W** 13–5	**Rocker** (4–4)	Love (4–3)	**King (2)**	SECN	3,609	30–9	11–6
April 21	at Alabama	No. 6	Sewell–Thomas Stadium	**W** 2–0	**Raby** (6–1)	Randolph (1–1)	**Brown** (9)	SECN+	3,006	31–9	12–6
April 25	No. 25 Auburn	No. 5	Hawkins Park	**W** 12–6	**Fellows** (9–0)	Burns (4–3)	**Hickman** (3)	ESPNU	3,050	32–9	13–6
April 26	No. 25 Auburn	No. 5	Hawkins Field	**W** 5–2	**Rocker** (5–4)	Fitts (3–3)	**Fisher (3)**	SECN	3,534	33–9	14–6
April 27	No. 25 Auburn	No. 5	Hawkins Field	**W** 9–5	**Raby** (7–1)	Fuller (2–2)		SECN+		34–9	15–6
April 30	Tennessee Tech	No. 4	Hawkins Field	**W** 21–10	**Hickman** (6–0)	Adams (2–2)		SECN+	3,191	35–9	

May (10–1)
Date	Opponent	Rank	Site/stadium	Score	Win	Loss	Save	TV	Attendance	Overall record	SEC record
May 3	at South Carolina	No. 4	Founders Park; Columbia, South Carolina	**W** 22–11	**Smith** (4–0)	Harley (2–3)		SECN+	6,570	36–9	16–6
May 4	at South Carolina	No. 4	Founders Park	**W** 9–3^{7}	**Rocker** (6–4)	Morgan (3–5)	**Brown** (10)	ESPNU		27–9	17–6
May 5	at South Carolina	No. 4	Founders Park	**W** 6–2^{7}	**Raby** (8–1)	Tringali (2–3)	**Brown** (11)	SECN+	7,027	38–9	18–6
May 7	at No. 6 Louisville	No. 3	Jim Patterson Stadium; Louisville, Kentucky	**W** 6–2	**Franklin** (1–0)	Kirian (2–1)		ESPNU	3,239	39–9	
May 10	No. 21 Missouri	No. 3	Hawkins Field	**W** 5–2	**Fellows** (10–0)	Cantleberry (4–4)	**Brown** (12)	SECN+	3,626	40–9	19–6
May 11	No. 21 Missouri	No. 3	Hawkins Field	**L** 2–5	Sikkema (7–3)	**Rocker** (6–5)	Bedell (5)	SECN+	3,262	40–10	19–7
May 12	No. 21 Missouri	No. 3	Hawkins Field	**W** 7–2	**Raby** (9–1)	Dillard (1–2)	**Fisher** (4)	SECN+	3,154	41–10	20–7
May 14	Middle Tennessee	No 2	Hawkins Field	**W** 5–2	**Eder** (1–0)	Bair (1–1)	**Brown** (13)	SECN+	3,525	42–10	
May 16	at Kentucky	No. 2	Kentucky Proud Park; Lexington, Kentucky	**W** 16–10	**Fisher** (2–0)	Harper 3–3)	**King** (3)	SECN+	3,649	43–10	21–7
May 17	at Kentucky	No. 2	Kentucky Proud Park	**W** 12–4	**Rocker** (7–5)	Marsh (3–3)		SECN+	4,491	44–10	22–7
May 18	at Kentucky	No. 2	Kentucky Proud Park	**W** 7–4	**Brown** (2–1)	Coleman (2–5)		SECN+	4,249	45–10	23–7

Postseason (14–2)

SEC Tournament (4–0)
Date	Opponent	Seed/Rank	Site/stadium	Score	Win	Loss	Save	TV	Attendance	Overall record	SECT Record
May 22	vs. (8) Auburn	(1)	Hoover Metropolitan Stadium; Hoover, Alabama	**W** 11–1	**Hickman** (7–0)	Gray (2–4)		SECN		46–10	1–0
May 23	vs. (4) Mississippi State	(1)	Hoover Metropolitan Stadium	**W** 1–0	**Fellows** (11–0)	Small (8–2)	**Brown** (14)	SECN	8,620	47–10	2–0
May 25	vs. (5) LSU	(1)	Hoover Metropolitan Stadium	**W** 13–4	**Rocker** (8–5)	Fontenot (5–1)		SECN	12,872	48–10	3–0
May 26	vs. (7) Ole Miss	(1)	Hoover Metropolitan Stadium	**W** 11–10	**Brown** (3–1)	Miller (5–3)		ESPN2	10,487	49–10	4–0

Nashville Regional (3–0)
Date	Opponent	Seed/Rank	Site/stadium	Score	Win	Loss	Save	TV	Attendance	Overall record	Regional Record
May 22	(4) Ohio State	No. 2 (1)	Hawkins Field	**W** 8–2	**Fellows** (12–0)	Burhenn (6–4)		ESPN2	3,626	50–10	1–0
May 22	(2) No. 23 Indiana State	No. 2 (1)	Hawkins Field	**W** 8–5	**Rocker** (9–5)	Liberatore (10–2)	**Eder** (3)	ESPN3	3,626	51–10	2–0
May 22	(2) No. 23 Indiana State	No. 2 (1)	Hawkins Field	**W** 12–1	**Hickman** (8–0)	Guerrero (1–3)		ESPN3	3,626	52–10	3–0

Nashville Super Regional (2–1)
Date	Opponent	Seed/Rank	Site/stadium	Score	Win	Loss	Save	TV	Attendance	Overall record	Regional Record
May 22	(3) Duke	No. 2 (1)	Hawkins Field	**L** 5–18	Gross (8–4)	**Fellows** (12–1)		ESPN2	3,626	52–11	0–1
May 22	(3) Duke	No. 2 (1)	Hawkins Field	**W** 3–0	**Rocker** (10–5)	Jarvis (5–2)		ESPNU	3,626	53–11	1–1
May 22	(3) Duke	No. 2 (1)	Hawkins Field	**W** 13–2	**Raby** (10–1)	Chillari (2–4)		ESPN2	3,626	54–11	2–1

College World Series (5–1)
Date	Opponent	Seed/Rank	Site/stadium	Score	Win	Loss	Save	TV	Attendance	Overall record	CWS record
June 16	vs. No. 4 Louisville	No. 2	TD Ameritrade Park • Omaha, NE	**W** 3–1	**Fellows** (13–1)	Hoeing (3–4)	**Brown** (15)	ESPN	22,704	55–11	1–0
June 18	vs. No. 3 Mississippi State	No. 2	TD Ameritrade Park • Omaha, NE	**W** 6–3	**Rocker** (11–5)	Plumlee (7–5)	**Brown** (16)	ESPN	15,465	56–11	2–0
June 21	vs. No. 4 Louisville	No. 2	TD Ameritrade Park • Omaha, NE	**W** 3–2	**Eder** (2–0)	Smith (6–1)	**Brown** (17)	ESPN	24,673	57–11	3–0
June 24	vs. Michigan	No. 2	TD Ameritrade Park • Omaha, NE	**L** 4–7	Henry (12–5)	**Fellows** (13–2)		ESPN	24,707	57–12	3–1
June 25	vs. Michigan	No. 2	TD Ameritrade Park • Omaha, NE	**W** 4–1	**Rocker** (12–5)	Paige (4–1)		ESPN	25,017	58–12	4–1
June 26	vs. Michigan	No. 2	TD Ameritrade Park • Omaha, NE	**W** 8–2	**Hickman** (9-0)	Kauffmann (12-7)	**Eder** (4)	ESPN	20,007	59–12	5–1

Schedule source:

*Rankings are based on the team's current ranking in the D1Baseball poll.

== Nashville Regional ==
Nashville Regional Teams
(1) Vanderbilt Commodores	(2) Indiana State Sycamores	(3) McNeese State Cowboys	(4) Ohio State Buckeyes

First Round
1	Vanderbilt	8
4	Ohio State	2
3	McNeese State	5
2	Indiana State	6
Lower round 1
4	Ohio State	9
3	McNeese State	8^{13}

Semi-Finals
1	Vanderbilt	8
2	Indiana State	5
Lower final
4	Ohio State	5
2	Indiana State	10

Finals
1	Vanderbilt	12	-
2	Indiana State	1	-

Nashville Regional Round 1
(4) Ohio State Buckeyes	vs.	(1) Vanderbilt Commodores

May 31, 2019, 6:00 pm (CDT) at Hawkins Field in Nashville, Tennessee
Team	1	2	3	4	5	6	7	8	9	R	H	E
(4) Ohio State	1	1	0	0	0	0	0	0	0	2	7	0
(1) Vanderbilt	2	2	0	2	0	0	1	1	X	8	11	2
WP: Drake Fellows (12–0) LP: Garrett Burhenn (6–4); Home runs: OSU: Conner Pohl (6); VAN: Julian Infante (9); Attendance: 3,626

Nashville Regional Round 2
(1) Vanderbilt Commodores	vs.	(2) Indiana State Sycamores

June 1, 2019, 6:00 pm (CDT) at Hawkins Field in Nashville, Tennessee
Team	1	2	3	4	5	6	7	8	9	R	H	E
(1) Vanderbilt	0	3	0	0	1	0	0	0	4	8	9	2
(2) Indiana State	1	0	0	0	0	0	0	0	4	5	12	0
WP: Kumar Rocker (9–5) LP: Collin Liberatore (10–2) Sv: Jake Eder (3); Home runs: VAN: None; INST: CJ Huntley (2); Attendance: 3,626

Nashville Regional Championship
(2) Indiana State Sycamores	vs.	(1) Vanderbilt Commodores

June 2, 2019, 8:00 pm (CDT) at Hawkins Field in Nashville, Tennessee
Team	1	2	3	4	5	6	7	8	9	R	H	E
(2) Indiana State	0	1	0	0	0	0	0	0	0	1	3	2
(1) Vanderbilt	0	0	0	1	1	5	3	2	X	12	12	1
WP: Mason Hickman (8–0) LP: Geremy Guerrero (1–3); Home runs: INST: Roby Enriquez (5); VAN: Philip Clarke (7); Ty Duvall (5); Julian Infante (10, 11); Attendance: 3,626

== Nashville Super Regional ==
Nashville Super Regional Game 1
Duke Blue Devils	vs.	(2) Vanderbilt Commodores

June 7, 2019, 5:00 pm (CDT) at Hawkins Field in Nashville, Tennessee
Team	1	2	3	4	5	6	7	8	9	R	H	E
Duke	0	2	4	1	0	0	1	10	0	18	15	0
(2) Vanderbilt	0	2	0	0	2	1	0	0	0	5	8	1
WP: Ben Gross (8–4) LP: Drake Fellows (12–1); Home runs: DUKE: Kyle Gallagher; VAN: Philip Clarke; Attendance: 3,626

Nashville Super Regional Game 2
(2) Vanderbilt Commodores	vs.	Duke Blue Devils

June 8, 2019, 8:00 pm (CDT) at Hawkins Field in Nashville, Tennessee
Team	1	2	3	4	5	6	7	8	9	R	H	E
(2) Vanderbilt	0	0	0	0	1	0	0	2	0	3	10	0
Duke	0	0	0	0	0	0	0	0	0	0	0	1
WP: Kumar Rocker (10–5) LP: Bryce Jarvis (5–2); Home runs: VAN: None; DUKE: None; Attendance: 3,626

Nashville Super Regional Championship
Duke Blue Devils	vs.	(2) Vanderbilt Commodores

June 9, 2019, 2:00 pm (CDT) at Hawkins Field in Nashville, Tennessee
Team	1	2	3	4	5	6	7	8	9	R	H	E
Duke	0	0	1	1	0	0	0	0	0	2	5	0
(2) Vanderbilt	4	2	3	1	2	0	0	1	X	13	14	0
WP: Patrick Raby (10–1) LP: Bill Chillari (2–4); Home runs: DUKE: Michael Rothenberg (11); Rudy Maxwell (4); VAN: Austin Martin (7, 8); Pat DeMarco (6); Stephen Scott (12); Julian Infante (12); Attendance: 3,626

== College World Series ==
2019 College World Series Teams
(5) Arkansas Razorbacks	Auburn Tigers	Florida State Seminoles	(7) Louisville Cardinals	Michigan Wolverines	(6) Mississippi State Bulldogs	(8) Texas Tech Red Raiders	(2) Vanderbilt Commodores

Seeds listed below indicate national seeds only

First round
Michigan	5
8	Texas Tech	3
5	Arkansas	0
Florida State	1
8	Texas Tech	5
5	Arkansas	4
Auburn	4
6	Mississippi State	5
7	Louisville	1
2	Vanderbilt	3
7	Louisville	5
Auburn	3

Second round
Michigan	2
Florida State	0
8	Texas Tech	4
Florida State	1
6	Mississippi State	3
2	Vanderbilt	6
7	Louisville	4
6	Mississippi State	3

Semifinals
Michigan	15	–
8	Texas Tech	3	–
2	Vanderbilt	3	–
7	Louisville	2	–

Championship
Michigan	7	1	2
2	Vanderbilt	4	4	8

June 16, 2019, 1:00 pm (CDT) at TD Ameritrade Park in Omaha, Nebraska
Team	1	2	3	4	5	6	7	8	9	R	H	E
(7) Louisville	0	0	0	0	1	0	0	0	0	1	8	1
(2) Vanderbilt	1	0	0	0	0	0	2	0	X	3	5	1
WP: Drake Fellows (13–1) LP: Bryan Hoeing (3–4) Sv: Tyler Brown (15); Home runs: LOU: None; VAN: Austin Martin (9, 10); Attendance: 22,704

College World Series Second Round
(2) Vanderbilt Commodores	vs.	(6) Mississippi State Bulldogs

June 19, 2019, 2:00 pm (CDT) at TD Ameritrade Park in Omaha, Nebraska
Team	1	2	3	4	5	6	7	8	9	R	H	E
(2) Vanderbilt	0	1	0	0	5	0	0	0	0	6	9	1
(6) Mississippi State	0	0	0	0	0	1	2	0	0	3	9	0
WP: Kumar Rocker (11–5) LP: Peyton Plumlee (7–5) Sv: Tyler Brown (16); Home runs: VAN: Stephen Scott (13, 14); MSST: Marshall Gilbert (6); Attendance: 15,465

College World Series Semifinals
(2) Vanderbilt Commodores	vs.	(7) Louisville Cardinals

June 21, 2019, 6:00 pm (CDT) at TD Ameritrade Park in Omaha, Nebraska
Team	1	2	3	4	5	6	7	8	9	R	H	E
(2) Vanderbilt	0	0	1	0	0	0	0	0	2	3	6	1
(7) Louisville	0	0	0	0	0	0	2	0	0	2	6	1
WP: Jake Eder (2–0) LP: Luke Smith (6–1) Sv: Tyler Brown (17); Home runs: VAN: None; LOU: None; Attendance: 24,673

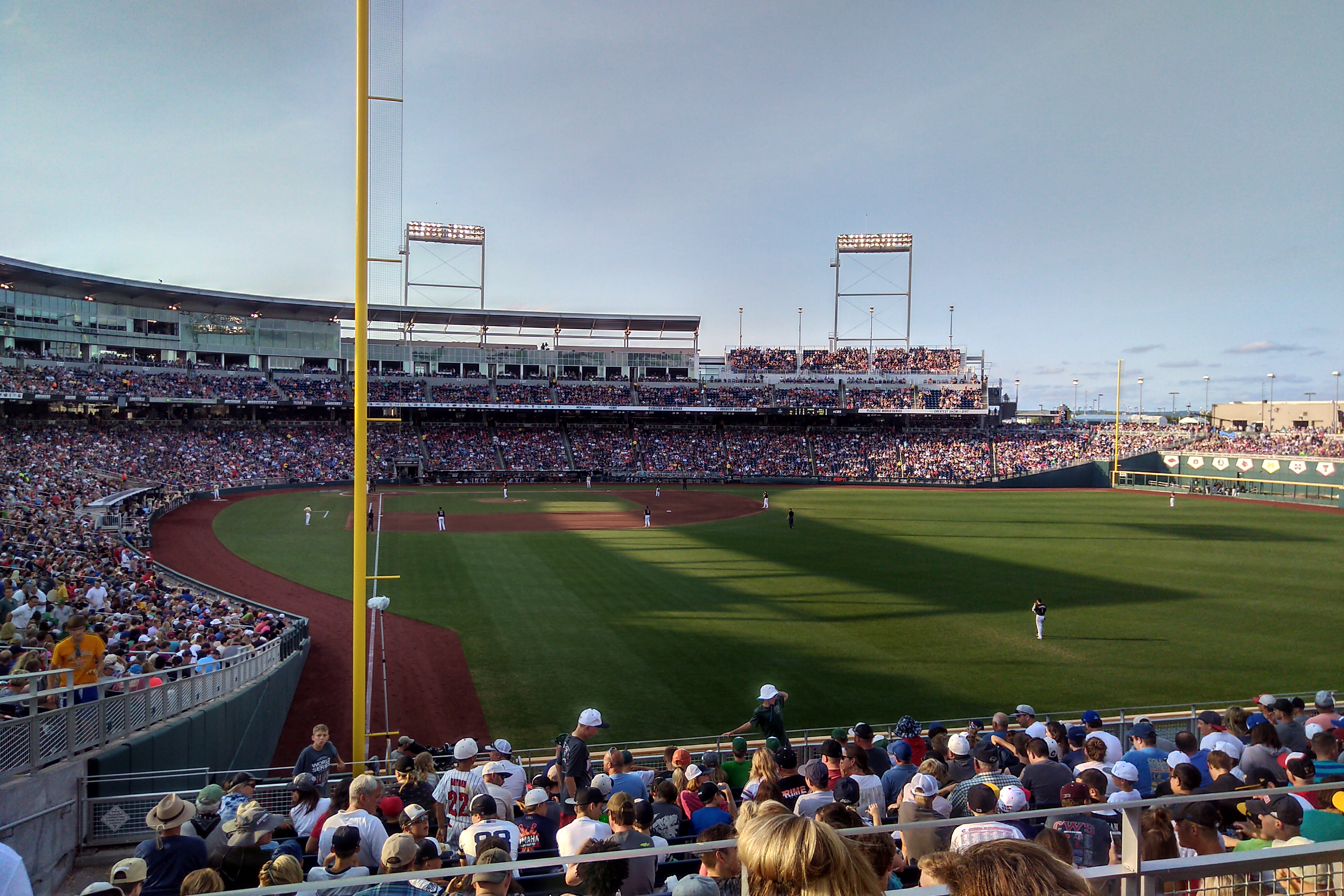
Vanderbilt and Louisville in Omaha

College World Series Finals Game One
Michigan Wolverines	vs.	(2) Vanderbilt Commodores

June 24, 2019, 6:00 pm (CDT) at TD Ameritrade Park in Omaha, Nebraska
Team	1	2	3	4	5	6	7	8	9	R	H	E
Michigan	2	2	0	0	0	0	2	1	0	7	14	1
(2) Vanderbilt	0	2	0	0	0	1	0	0	1	4	7	1
WP: Tommy Henry (12–5) LP: Drake Fellows (13–2); Home runs: MICH: Jimmy Kerr (15); Joe Donovan (9); VAN: JJ Bleday (27); Attendance: 24,707

College World Series Finals Game Two
(2) Vanderbilt Commodores	vs.	Michigan Wolverines

June 25, 2019, 6:00 pm (CDT) at TD Ameritrade Park in Omaha, Nebraska
Team	1	2	3	4	5	6	7	8	9	R	H	E
(2) Vanderbilt	0	0	0	0	1	2	1	0	0	4	6	2
Michigan	0	0	0	0	0	0	1	0	0	1	4	2
WP: Kumar Rocker (12–5) LP: Isaiah Paige (4–1); Home runs: VAN: Philip Clarke (9); MICH: None; Attendance: 25, 017

College World Series National Championship
Michigan Wolverines	vs.	(2) Vanderbilt Commodores

June 26, 2019, 6:00 pm (CDT) at TD Ameritrade Park in Omaha, Nebraska
Team	1	2	3	4	5	6	7	8	9	R	H	E
Michigan	1	0	0	0	0	0	0	1	0	2	6	0
(2) Vanderbilt	0	1	3	2	0	0	1	1	X	8	9	0
WP: Mason Hickman (9–0) LP: Karl Kauffmann (12–7) Sv: Jake Eder (4); Home runs: MICH: None; VAN: Pat DeMarco (7); Attendance: 20,007

== Record vs. conference opponents ==
Last two do not qualify for conf. tourn. Blank are not scheduled. Blue are home games, otherwise away.

2019 SEC baseball records Source: 2019 SEC baseball game results
Team	W–L	ALA	ARK	AUB	FLA	UGA	KEN	LSU	MSU	MIZZ	MISS	SCAR	TENN	TAMU	VAN	Team	Div	SR	SW
ALA	7–23		1–2	1–2	0–3	0–3	.	1–2	0–3	.	1–2	2–1	.	1–2	0–3	ALA	W7	1–9	0–4
ARK	20–10	2–1		2–1	.	.	2–1	3–0	2–1	3–0	1–2	.	3–0	1–2	1–2	ARK	W1	7–3	3–0
AUB	14–16	2–1	1–2		.	1–2	.	1–2	1–2	.	2–1	2–1	3–0	1–2	0–3	AUB	W6	4–6	1–1
FLA	13–17	3–0	.	.		0–3	2–1	1–2	1–2	3–0	0–3	2–1	1–2	.	0–3	FLA	E5	4–6	2–3
UGA	21–9	3–0	.	2–1	3–0		2–1	2–1	0–3	3–0	.	3–0	1–2	.	2–1	UGA	E2	8–2	4–1
KEN	7–23	.	1–2	.	1–2	1–2		0–3	.	1–2	2–1	1–2	0–3	0–3	0–3	KEN	E7	1–9	0–4
LSU	17–13	2–1	0–3	2–1	2–1	1–2	3–0		3–0	1–2	1–2	.	.	2–1	.	LSU	W3	6–4	2–1
MSU	20–10	3–0	1–2	2–1	2–1	3–0	.	0–3		.	3–0	2–1	2–1	2–1	.	MSU	W2	8–2	3–1
MIZZ	13–16	.	0–3	.	0–3	0–3	2–1	2–1	.		2–1	3–0	2–1	1–1	1–2	MIZZ	E4	5–4	1–3
MISS	16–14	2–1	2–1	1–2	3–0	.	1–2	2–1	0–3	1–2		.	1–2	3–0	.	MISS	W5	5–5	2–1
SCAR	8–22	1–2	.	1–2	1–2	0–3	2–1	.	1–2	0–3	.		1–2	1–2	0–3	SCAR	E6	1–9	0–3
TENN	14–16	.	0–3	0–3	2–1	2–1	3–0	.	1–2	1–2	2–1	2–1		.	1–2	TENN	E3	5–5	1–2
TAMU	16–13	2–1	2–1	2–1	.	.	3–0	1–2	1–2	1–1	0–3	2–1	.		2–1	TAMU	W4	6–3	1–1
VAN	23–7	3–0	2–1	3–0	3–0	1–2	3–0	.	.	2–1	.	3–0	2–1	1–2		VAN	E1	8–2	5–0
Team	W–L	ALA	ARK	AUB	FLA	UGA	KEN	LSU	MSU	MIZZ	MISS	SCAR	TENN	TAMU	VAN	Team	Div	SR	SW

Updated for entire regular season. Missouri at Texas A&M series had one tie game.

== Rankings ==
Ranking movements Legend: ██ Increase in ranking ██ Decrease in ranking ( ) = First-place votes
	Week																		
Poll	Pre	1	2	3	4	5	6	7	8	9	10	11	12	13	14	15	16	17	Final
Coaches'	2 (10)	2 (10) *		1 (19)	2 (15)	6 (1)	5 (4)	4 (2)	8	5 (1)	4 (1)	2 (2)	2 (7)	2 (3)	2 (4)	2 (9)	2 (9)*	2 (9)*	1 (30)
Baseball America	1 (1)	1	1	1	1	5	4	3	6	6	5	3	2	2	2	2	2*	2*	1
Collegiate Baseball^	2	2	2	2	4	6	5	5	6	6	5	2	2	2	2	2	2	1	1
NCBWA†	1 (1)	2	2	1	1	5	4	3	7	5	4	3	2	2	2	2	2*	2*	1
D1Baseball	1	1	1	1	1	8	6	5	7	6	5	4	3	3	2	2	2*	2*	1

^ Collegiate Baseball ranked 40 teams in their preseason poll, but only ranked 30 teams weekly during the season.
† NCBWA ranks 30 teams in their preseason poll, but only ranks 25 teams weekly during the season.
* A new poll was not released for this week, so for comparison purposes, the previous week's ranking is inserted in this week's slot.

== 2019 MLB draft ==
Vanderbilt had 13 players selected in the 2019 MLB draft, tying a SEC record.

Player	Position	Round	Overall	MLB team
J.J. Bleday	OF	1	4	Miami Marlins
Drake Fellows	RHP	6	173	San Diego Padres
Phillip Clarke	C	9	267	Toronto Blue Jays
Ethan Paul	SS	9	274	Pittsburgh Pirates
Stephen Scott	OF	10	317	Boston Red Sox
Zach King	LHP	13	381	Miami Marlins
Jackson Gillis	LHP	13	403	Milwaukee Brewers
Joe Gobillot	LHP	16	488	Tampa Bay Rays
A.J. Franklin	RHP	17	499	Kansas City Royals
Patrick Raby	RHP	17	504	Cincinnati Reds
Pat DeMarco	OF	17	525	New York Yankees
Ty Duvall	C	25	764	Oakland Athletics
Julian Infante	1B	36	1,071	Miami Marlins
