= Jeff Pickler =

American baseball player & coach (born 1976)

Colorado Rockies – No. 61
- Second baseman / Coach
- Born: January 6, 1976 (age 50); Garden Grove, California, U.S.
- Bats: Left Throws: Right
- Stats at Baseball Reference

Teams
- As coach: Minnesota Twins (2017–2018); Cincinnati Reds (2019–2024); Colorado Rockies (2026–present)

Jeff Blaine Pickler (born January 6, 1976) is an American professional baseball coach who currently serves as the bench coach for the Colorado Rockies of Major League Baseball (MLB). He has previously coached in Major League Baseball (MLB) for the Minnesota Twins and Cincinnati Reds.

== Early life and career ==
Pickler was born in Garden Grove, California. He attended Foothill High School in Santa Ana, California, where he played for the school's baseball team. He then enrolled at Cypress College, where he played college baseball for the Cypress Chargers for one season. He then transferred to the University of Tennessee to continue his college baseball career with the Tennessee Volunteers. In 1997, he played collegiate summer baseball for the Wareham Gatemen of the Cape Cod Baseball League, helping to lead the Gatemen to the league title.

In 1998, Pickler was named the Southeastern Conference Baseball Player of the Year. He graduated magna cum laude from Tennessee. The Milwaukee Brewers selected Pickler in the 11th round of the 1998 Major League Baseball draft; he played in Minor League Baseball for the Brewers, Texas Rangers, and Colorado Rockies organizations for eight years.

== Post-playing career ==
After he retired as a player, Pickler became a scout for the Arizona Diamondbacks. After three years with the Diamondbacks, he spent one year as an assistant coach for the Arizona Wildcats of the University of Arizona. He then spent four years as a scout for the San Diego Padres. Pickler joined the front office of the Los Angeles Dodgers in 2014 as a special assistant in professional scouting and player development.

The Twins hired Pickler to their major league coaching staff prior to the 2017 season. The Cincinnati Reds hired him before the 2019 season.

On September 22, 2024, the Reds fired Pickler, along with manager David Bell.

On December 17, 2025, Pickler was hired to serve as the bench coach for the Colorado Rockies.

== Personal life ==
Pickler's father, Scott, is the coach for the Cypress College baseball team and the longtime field manager of the Yarmouth-Dennis Red Sox of the Cape Cod Baseball League.
