= Enrique Bradfield =

American baseball player (born 2001)

Enrique Bradfield Jr.

Baltimore Orioles
- Outfielder
- Born: December 2, 2001 (age 24); Pembroke Pines, Florida, U.S.
- Bats: Left Throws: Left
- Stats at Baseball Reference
Medals
Men's baseball
Representing the United States
Haarlem Baseball Week
Bronze medal – third place	2022	Team

Enrique Antonio Bradfield Jr. (born December 2, 2001) is an American professional baseball outfielder for the Baltimore Orioles of Major League Baseball (MLB).

== High school career ==
Bradfield attended American Heritage School in Plantation, Florida where he played baseball. In July 2019, he participated in the High School All-Star Game at Progressive Field. During his shortened senior season in 2020, he batted .367 with one home run, ten RBIs, and five stolen bases.

== College career ==
Bradfield went unselected in the 2020 Major League Baseball draft and enrolled at Vanderbilt University to play college baseball.

Bradfield was immediately inserted into the Vanderbilt starting lineup as a freshman in 2021. Over 67 games, he batted .336 with one home run, 38 RBIs, and 47 stolen bases, which led the NCAA. He was named the Southeastern Conference Baseball Freshman of the Year as well as First Team All-SEC. Defensively, he had a .992 field percentage, earned a ABCA/Rawlings Gold Glove, and was named to the SEC All-Defensive Team. Bradfield returned as Vanderbilt's starting center fielder in 2022 and was named First Team All-SEC and to the SEC All-Defensive Team for the second consecutive year. Over 62 games, he slashed .317/.415/.498 with eight home runs, 36 RBIs, and 46 stolen bases. He was named to the USA Baseball Collegiate National Team following the season's end, and played in the Cape Cod Baseball League with the Cotuit Kettleers. For the 2023 season with Vanderbilt, Bradfield hit .279 with six home runs, 34 RBIs, and 37 stolen bases over 62 games.

== Professional career ==
Bradfield was selected by the Baltimore Orioles with the 17th overall pick in the 2023 Major League Baseball draft. On July 17, 2023, Bradfield signed with the Orioles for a slot value bonus worth $4.17 million.

Bradfield made his professional debut with the Florida Complex League Orioles and also played with the Delmarva Shorebirds and Aberdeen IronBirds. Over 25 games between the three teams, he hit .291 with 25 stolen bases. Bradfield was assigned to Aberdeen to open the 2024 season. In mid-August, he was promoted to the Bowie Baysox. Over 108 games, he slashed .272/.358/.371 with four home runs, 35 RBIs, and 74 stolen bases.

Bradfield returned to the Baysox, now the Chesapeake Baysox, to open the 2025 season. He was selected to represent the Orioles organization at the 2025 All-Star Futures Game. In July, he was placed on the injured list due to a hamstring strain. He made 11 rehab appearances between the FCL and Aberdeen before returning to Chesapeake. Near the season's end, he was promoted to the Norfolk Tides. Over 76 total games played for the season, Bradfield hit .242 with three home runs, 19 RBIs, and 36 stolen bases. After the season, he was assigned to play in the Arizona Fall League for the Peoria Javelinas.

Bradfield was assigned to Norfolk to open the 2026 season. He was placed on the injured list in late April with a left hand injury suffered after colliding with the outfield wall. He completed rehab assignments with Delmarva and the Frederick Keys and was then activated and assigned back to Norfolk on June 9. Across 88 games with Norfolk, Bradford batted .263 with four home runs, 33 RBIs, and 36 stolen bases. After the season, the Orioles added him to their 40-man roster to protect him from the Rule 5 draft.

On November 17, 2026, He had his contract selected to the 40-man roster to protect him from the Rule 5 draft.

== International career ==
Bradfield played for Team Panama in the 2026 World Baseball Classic.

== Personal life ==
Bradfield is of Panamanian descent through his father. His father, Enrique Sr., played college baseball at St. Thomas University.
