= 2019 South Carolina Gamecocks baseball team =

American college baseball season

2019 South Carolina Gamecocks baseball
- Conference: Southeastern Conference
- Eastern Division
- Record: 28–28 (8–22 SEC)
- Head coach: Mark Kingston (2nd season)
- Assistant coaches: Mike Current; Skylar Meade
- Home stadium: Founders Park

2019 Southeastern Conference baseball standings
	Conf.						Overall
Team	W		L		T	PCT	W		L		T	PCT
Eastern
No. 1 Vanderbilt ^{x}‍†‍‡‍^{y}	23	–	7	–	0	.767	58	–	12	–	0	.829
No. 18 Georgia ‍‍‍^{y}	21	–	9	–	0	.700	46	–	17	–	0	.730
Tennessee ‍‍‍^{y}	14	–	16	–	0	.467	40	–	21	–	0	.656
Missouri ‍‍‍	13	–	16	–	1	.450	34	–	22	–	1	.605
Florida ‍‍‍^{y}	13	–	17	–	0	.433	34	–	26	–	0	.567
South Carolina ‍‍‍	8	–	22	–	0	.267	28	–	28	–	0	.500
Kentucky ‍‍‍	7	–	23	–	0	.233	26	–	29	–	0	.473
Western
No. 5 Mississippi State ^{x}‍‍‍^{y}	20	–	10	–	0	.667	52	–	15	–	0	.776
No. 6 Arkansas ^{x}‍‍‍^{y}	20	–	10	–	0	.667	46	–	20	–	0	.697
No. 14 LSU ‍‍‍^{y}	17	–	13	–	0	.567	40	–	26	–	0	.606
No. 20 Texas A&M ‍‍‍^{y}	16	–	13	–	1	.550	39	–	23	–	1	.627
No. 12 Ole Miss ‍‍‍^{y}	16	–	14	–	0	.533	41	–	27	–	0	.603
No. 9 Auburn ‍‍‍^{y}	14	–	16	–	0	.467	38	–	28	–	0	.576
Alabama ‍‍‍	7	–	23	–	0	.233	30	–	26	–	0	.536
x – Division champion † – Conference champion ‡ – Tournament champion y – Invited to the NCAA tournament As of June 25, 2019; Rankings from D1Baseball

The 2019 South Carolina Gamecocks baseball team represented the University of South Carolina in the 2019 NCAA Division I baseball season. The Gamecocks played their home games at Founders Park, and were led by second-year head coach Mark Kingston.

== Preseason ==
=== Preseason All-American teams ===
2nd Team

- Noah Campbell – Second Baseman (Baseball America)

=== SEC media poll ===
The SEC media poll was released on February 7, 2019 with the Gamecocks predicted to finish in fourth place in the Eastern Division.

Media poll (East)
Predicted finish	Team	Votes (1st place)
1	Vanderbilt	87 (9)
2	Florida	81 (4)
3	Georgia	68 (1)
4	South Carolina	53
5	Tennessee	40
6	Kentucky	30
7	Missouri	26

=== Preseason All-SEC teams ===
1st Team

- Noah Campbell – Second Baseman

== Roster ==
2019 South Carolina Gamecocks roster
Pitchers: 13 Graham Lawson – Senior; 15 Daniel Lloyd – Freshman; 16 John Gilreath – Sophomore; 20 Reid Morgan – Junior; 21 Carmen Mlodzinski – Sophomore; 22 Logan Chapman – Sophomore; 23 Sawyer Bridges – Junior; 27 Gage Hinson – Senior; 28 Ridge Chapman – Senior; 36 TJ Shook – Sophomore; 37 Cam Tringali – Freshman; 40 Wesley Sweatt – Freshman; 41 Cole Ganopulos – Junior; 43 Hayden Lehman – Junior; 44 Parker Coyne – Sophomore; 47 Dylan Harley – Freshman; 48 Julian Bosnic – Freshman; 49 Brett Kerry – Freshman	Catchers: 14 Luke Berryhill – Junior; 33 Chris Cullen – Senior; 38 Wes Clarke – Freshman; Infielders: 2 Noah Campbell – Sophomore; 4 Jonah Beamon – Freshman; 6 George Callil – Junior; 8 Jacob English – Freshman; 10 Nick Neville – Junior; 12 Josiah Sightler – Freshman; 26 Quinntin Perez – Junior; 35 Jordan Holladay – Sophomore	Outfielders: 3 Brady Allen – Freshman; 5 TJ Hopkins – Senior; 11 Andrew Eyster – Senior; 24 Ian Jenkins – Freshman; 31 Joel Brewer – Freshman; Utility: 7 Jacob Olson – Senior

== Schedule and results ==
Legend
	South Carolina win
	South Carolina loss
	Cancellation
**Bold**	South Carolina team member

2019 South Carolina Gamecocks baseball game log
Regular season (28–27)

February (7–1)
Date	Opponent	Rank	Site/stadium	Score	Win	Loss	Save	TV	Attendance	Overall record	SEC record
February 15	Liberty		Founders Park; Columbia, SC	**L** 5–6	**Brabrand** (1–0)	Gilreath (0–1)		SECN+	7,507	0–1	
February 16	Liberty		Founders Park	**W** 13–7	**Shook** (1–0)	Meyer (0–1)		SECN+	6,726	1–1	
February 17	Liberty		Founders Park	**W** 3–2	**Kerry** (1–0)	Price (0–1)		SECN+	6,010	2–1	
February 19	Winthrop		Founders Park	**W** 8–6	**Coyne** (1–0)	Rendon (0–1)	**Bridges** (1)	SECN+	5,771	3–1	
February 20	Presbyterian		Founders Park	**Cancelled due to weather.**							
February 22	Utah Valley		Founders Park	**W** 15–3	**Kerry** (2–0)	Carr (0–2)		SECN+	5,828	4–1	
February 23	Utah Valley		Founders Park	**W** 6–5	**Gilreath** (1–1)	Schmit (0–1)		SECN+	5,980	5–1	
February 24	Utah Valley		Founders Park	**W** 10–3	**Morgan** (1–0)	Ramsey (0–2)		SECN+	5,917	6–1	
February 26	Appalachian State		Founders Park	**W** 3–1	**Coyne** (2–0)	Boone (0–1)		SECN+	5,874	7–1	

March (10–10)
Date	Opponent	Rank	Site/stadium	Score	Win	Loss	Save	TV	Attendance	Overall record	SEC record
March 1	No. 23 Clemson		Doug Kingsmore Stadium; Clemson, SC	**W** 5–4	**Sweatt** (1–0)	Crawford (0–1)		ACC Extra	5,933	8–1	
March 2	vs. No. 23 Clemson		Fluor Field at the West End; Greenville, SC	**L** 5–11	**Weatherly** (2–0)	Harley (0–1)		SECN+	7,432	8–2	
March 3	No. 23 Clemson		Founders Park	**W** 14–3	**Morgan** (2–0)	Wrobleski (0–2)		SECN+	8,242	9–2	
March 5	The Citadel	No. 24	Founders Park	**W** 9–0	**Shook** (2–0)	Reeves (0–1)		SECN+	5,807	10–2	
March 6	Gardner–Webb	No. 24	Founders Park	**L** 2–10	Davis (1–0)	**Lehman** (0–1)		SECN+	5,622	10–3	
March 8	Valparaiso	No. 24	Founders Park	**W** 9–2	**Gilreath** (2–1)	Kornacker (0–2)	**Tringali** (1)	SECN+	5,683	11–3	
March 9	Valparaiso	No. 24	Founders Park	**W** 3–2	**Lloyd** (1–0)	Quigley (0–1)		SECN+	6,149	12–3	
March 10	Valparaiso	No. 24	Founders Park	**W** 12–6	**Bridges** (1–0)	Skidmore (0–1)	**Shook** (1)	SECN+	5,814	13–3	
March 12	at The Citadel	No. 22	Joseph P. Riley Jr. Park • Charleston, SC	**W** 10–9	**Lloyd** (2–0)	Flanders (0–2)	**Hinson** (1)		3,923	14–3	
March 15	No. 8 Georgia	No. 22	Founders Park	**L** 1–6	Hancock (5–0)	**Sweatt** (1–1)		SECN+	6,435	14–4	0–1
March 16	No. 8 Georgia	No. 22	Founders Park	**L** 7–8	Proctor (3–0)	**Lloyd** (2–1)	Schunk (7)	SECN+	7,210	14–5	0–2
March 17	No. 8 Georgia	No. 22	Founders Park	**L** 2–4	Kristofak (3–0)	**Kerry** (2–1)		SECN+	6,539	14–6	0–3
March 19	at Furman		Latham Baseball Stadium • Greenville, SC	**W** 12–7	**Harley** (1–1)	Bertrand (1–2)			1,783	15–6	
March 22	at Tennessee		Lindsey Nelson Stadium • Knoxville, TN	**L** 5–15	Stallings (5–1)	**Sweatt** (1–2)		SECN+	1,807	15–7	0–4
March 23	at Tennessee		Lindsey Nelson Stadium • Knoxville, TN	**W** 3–2	**Tringali** (1–0)	Linginfelter (4–2)	**Kerry** (3)	SECN+	2,662	16–7	1–4
March 24	at Tennessee		Lindsey Nelson Stadium • Knoxville, TN	**L** 3–6	Crochet (2–1)	**Hinson** (0–1)		SECN+	1,918	16–8	1–5
March 26	North Carolina A&T		Founders Park • Columbia, SC	**L** 0–2	Johnson (4–1)	**Harley** (1–2)	Hunter (4)	SECN+	5,810	16–9	
March 29	No. 15 Auburn		Founders Park • Columbia, SC	**L** 2–4	Burns (4–0)	**Lloyd** (2–2)	Greenhill (5)	SECN+	6,898	16–10	1–6
March 30	No. 15 Auburn		Founders Park • Columbia, SC	**W** 4–0	**Morgan** (3–0)	Fuller (1–1)		SECN	7,390	17–10	2–6
March 31	No. 15 Auburn		Founders Park • Columbia, SC	**L** 5–7	Fitts (2–0)	**Shook** (2–1)	Greenhill (6)	SECN	6,564	17–11	2–7

April (7–9)
Date	Opponent	Rank	Site/stadium	Score	Win	Loss	Save	TV	Attendance	Overall record	SEC record
April 2	vs. No. 3 NC State		BB&T Ballpark • Charlotte, NC	**W** 10–8	**Sweatt** (2–2)	Cotter (1–1)			4,090	18–11	
April 4	at Alabama		Sewell–Thomas Stadium • Tuscaloosa, AL	**L** 0–9	Finnerty (5–3)	**Lloyd** (2–3)		SECN		18–12	2–8
April 5	at Alabama		Sewell–Thomas Stadium • Tuscaloosa, AL	**L** 1–4	Love (4–1)	**Morgan** (3–1)	Randolph (5)	SECN	3,171	18–13	2–9
April 6	at Alabama		Sewell–Thomas Stadium • Tuscaloosa, AL	**W** 5–4	**Kerry** (3–1)	Medders (2–2)		SECN+	3,146	19–13	3–9
April 9	Charlotte		Founders Park • Columbia, SC	**W** 5–4	**Bridges** (2–0)	Ard (1–1)	**Sweatt** (1)	SECN+	5,945	20–13	
April 11	at Florida		Alfred A. McKethan Stadium • Gainesville, FL	**L** 5–9	Mace (6–3)	**Morgan** (3–2)		ESPNU	3,414	20–14	3–10
April 12	at Florida		Alfred A. McKethan Stadium • Gainesville, FL	**W** 6–3	**Tringali** (2–0)	Scott (3–2)		SECN+	4,512	21–14	4–10
April 13	at Florida		Alfred A. McKethan Stadium • Gainesville, FL	**L** 4–6	Luethje (1–1)	**Sweatt** (2–3)		SECN+	4,908	21–15	4–11
April 16	vs. No. 17 North Carolina		BB&T Ballpark • Charlotte, NC	**W** 5–2	**Harley** (2–2)	Grogan (2–1)	**Kerry** (4)		6,783	22–15	
April 18	No. 7 Texas A&M		Founders Park • Columbia, SC	**L** 2–8	Doxakis (5–2)	**Morgan** (3–3)		SECN+	6,905	22–16	4–12
April 19	No. 7 Texas A&M		Founders Park • Columbia, SC	**W** 3–2	**Shook** (3–1)	Lacy (6–2)	**Kerry** (5)	SECN+		23–16	5–12
April 20	No. 7 Texas A&M		Founders Park • Columbia, SC	**L** 3–6	Menefee (3–0)	**Tringali** (2–1)	Kalich (10)	SECN	7,428	23–17	5–13
April 23	vs. Charleston Southern		SRP Park • North Augusta, SC	**W** 10–3	**Lloyd** (3–3)	Adams (0–2)		SECN+	2,998	24–17	
April 26	at Missouri		Taylor Stadium • Columbia, MO	**L** 2–5	Cantleberry (4–3)	**Morgan** (3–4)	Bedell (4)	SECN+	1,216	24–18	5–14
April 27	at Missouri		Taylor Stadium • Columbia, MO	**L** 0–11	Sikkema (5–3)	**Tringali** (2–2)		SECN+	1,345	24–19	5–15
April 28	at Missouri		Taylor Stadium • Columbia, MO	**L** 7–9	Dulle (4–3)	**Bridges** (2–1)		SECN+	920	24–20	5–16

May (4–7)
Date	Opponent	Rank	Site/stadium	Score	Win	Loss	Save	TV	Attendance	Overall record	SEC record
May 3	No. 4 Vanderbilt		Founders Park • Columbia, SC	**L** 11–22	Smith (4–0)	**Harley** (2–3)		SECN+	6,570	24–21	5–17
May 4	No. 4 Vanderbilt		Founders Park • Columbia, SC	**L** 3–9	Rocker (6–4)	**Morgan** (3–5)	Brown (10)	ESPNU		24–22	5–18
May 5	No. 4 Vanderbilt		Founders Park • Columbia, SC	**L** 2–6	Raby (8–1)	**Tringali** (2–3)	Brown (11)	SECN+	7,027	24–23	5–19
May 8	Furman		Founders Park • Columbia, SC	**L** 4–7	Taylor (1–1)	**Harley** (2–4)	Hughes (2)	SECN+	5,909	24–24	
May 10	Kentucky		Founders Park • Columbia, SC	**W** 5–4	**Harley** (3–4)	Ayers (0–2)	**Kerry** (6)	SECN	5,983	25–24	6–19
May 11	Kentucky		Founders Park • Columbia, SC	**W** 11–3	**Morgan** (4–5)	Ramsey (3–6)	**Kerry** (7)	SECN	6,451	26–24	7–19
May 12	Kentucky		Founders Park • Columbia, SC	**L** 2–6	Thompson (6–1)	**Lloyd** (3–4)		SECN	6,008	26–25	7–20
May 14	USC Upstate		Founders Park • Columbia, SC	**W** 1–0	**Hinson** (1–1)	Van Der Weide (2–3)		SECN+	5,934	27–25	
May 16	at No. 5 Mississippi State		Dudy Noble Field • Starkville, MS	**L** 7–24	Small (8–1)	**Tringali** (2–4)		SECN+	8,094	27–26	7–21
May 17	at No. 5 Mississippi State		Dudy Noble Field • Starkville, MS	**L** 2–11	White (3–1)	**Morgan** (4–6)		SECN+	9,235	27–27	7–22
May 18	at No. 5 Mississippi State		Dudy Noble Field • Starkville, MS	**W** 10–8	**Kerry** (4–1)	Plumlee (5–4)	**Coyne** (1)	SECN+	10,461	28–27	8–22

Post-season (0–1)

SEC Tournament (0–1)
Date	Opponent	Seed/Rank	Site/stadium	Score	Win	Loss	Save	TV	Attendance	Overall record	SECT Record
May 21	vs. No. 16 (5) LSU	(12)	Hoover Metropolitan Stadium • Hoover, AL	**L** 6–8	Fontenot (5–1)	**Coyne** (2–1)	Peterson (3)	SECN	10,129	28–28	0–1

Schedule source:

*Rankings are based on the team's current ranking in the D1Baseball poll.

== Record vs. conference opponents ==
Last two do not qualify for conf. tourn. Blank are not scheduled. Blue are home games, otherwise away.

2019 SEC baseball records Source: 2019 SEC baseball game results
Team	W–L	ALA	ARK	AUB	FLA	UGA	KEN	LSU	MSU	MIZZ	MISS	SCAR	TENN	TAMU	VAN	Team	Div	SR	SW
ALA	7–23		1–2	1–2	0–3	0–3	.	1–2	0–3	.	1–2	2–1	.	1–2	0–3	ALA	W7	1–9	0–4
ARK	20–10	2–1		2–1	.	.	2–1	3–0	2–1	3–0	1–2	.	3–0	1–2	1–2	ARK	W1	7–3	3–0
AUB	14–16	2–1	1–2		.	1–2	.	1–2	1–2	.	2–1	2–1	3–0	1–2	0–3	AUB	W6	4–6	1–1
FLA	13–17	3–0	.	.		0–3	2–1	1–2	1–2	3–0	0–3	2–1	1–2	.	0–3	FLA	E5	4–6	2–3
UGA	21–9	3–0	.	2–1	3–0		2–1	2–1	0–3	3–0	.	3–0	1–2	.	2–1	UGA	E2	8–2	4–1
KEN	7–23	.	1–2	.	1–2	1–2		0–3	.	1–2	2–1	1–2	0–3	0–3	0–3	KEN	E7	1–9	0–4
LSU	17–13	2–1	0–3	2–1	2–1	1–2	3–0		3–0	1–2	1–2	.	.	2–1	.	LSU	W3	6–4	2–1
MSU	20–10	3–0	1–2	2–1	2–1	3–0	.	0–3		.	3–0	2–1	2–1	2–1	.	MSU	W2	8–2	3–1
MIZZ	13–16	.	0–3	.	0–3	0–3	2–1	2–1	.		2–1	3–0	2–1	1–1	1–2	MIZZ	E4	5–4	1–3
MISS	16–14	2–1	2–1	1–2	3–0	.	1–2	2–1	0–3	1–2		.	1–2	3–0	.	MISS	W5	5–5	2–1
SCAR	8–22	1–2	.	1–2	1–2	0–3	2–1	.	1–2	0–3	.		1–2	1–2	0–3	SCAR	E6	1–9	0–3
TENN	14–16	.	0–3	0–3	2–1	2–1	3–0	.	1–2	1–2	2–1	2–1		.	1–2	TENN	E3	5–5	1–2
TAMU	16–13	2–1	2–1	2–1	.	.	3–0	1–2	1–2	1–1	0–3	2–1	.		2–1	TAMU	W4	6–3	1–1
VAN	23–7	3–0	2–1	3–0	3–0	1–2	3–0	.	.	2–1	.	3–0	2–1	1–2		VAN	E1	8–2	5–0
Team	W–L	ALA	ARK	AUB	FLA	UGA	KEN	LSU	MSU	MIZZ	MISS	SCAR	TENN	TAMU	VAN	Team	Div	SR	SW

Updated for entire regular season. Missouri at Texas A&M series had one tie game.

== Rankings ==
Ranking movements Legend: ██ Increase in ranking ██ Decrease in ranking — = Not ranked
	Week																			
Poll	Pre	1	2	3	4	5	6	7	8	9	10	11	12	13	14	15	16	17	18	Final
Coaches'	—	—*	*	24																
Baseball America	—	—	—	20																
Collegiate Baseball^	—	—	30	19																
NCBWA†	—	—	27	27																
D1Baseball	—	—	—	24																

^ Collegiate Baseball ranked 40 teams in their preseason poll, but only ranked 30 teams weekly during the season.
† NCBWA ranks 30 teams in their preseason poll, but only ranks 25 teams weekly during the season.
* A new poll was not released for this week, so for comparison purposes, the previous week's ranking is inserted in this week's slot.

== 2019 MLB draft ==
Player	Position	Round	Overall	MLB team
TJ Hopkins	C	9	264	Cincinnati Reds
Luke Berryhill	C	13	384	Cincinnati Reds
Reid Morgan	RHP	13	396	Seattle Mariners
Jacob Olson	INF	26	792	Chicago Cubs
Ridge Chapman	RHP	34	1,021	Los Angeles Angels
