= 2019 Missouri Tigers baseball team =

American college baseball season

2019 Missouri Tigers baseball
- Conference: Southeastern Conference
- Eastern Division
- Record: 34–22–1 (13–16–1 SEC)
- Head coach: Steve Bieser (3rd season)
- Assistant coaches: Lance Rhodes; Fred Corral
- Home stadium: Taylor Stadium

2019 Southeastern Conference baseball standings
	Conf.						Overall
Team	W		L		T	PCT	W		L		T	PCT
Eastern
No. 1 Vanderbilt ^{x}‍†‍‡‍^{y}	23	–	7	–	0	.767	58	–	12	–	0	.829
No. 18 Georgia ‍‍‍^{y}	21	–	9	–	0	.700	46	–	17	–	0	.730
Tennessee ‍‍‍^{y}	14	–	16	–	0	.467	40	–	21	–	0	.656
Missouri ‍‍‍	13	–	16	–	1	.450	34	–	22	–	1	.605
Florida ‍‍‍^{y}	13	–	17	–	0	.433	34	–	26	–	0	.567
South Carolina ‍‍‍	8	–	22	–	0	.267	28	–	28	–	0	.500
Kentucky ‍‍‍	7	–	23	–	0	.233	26	–	29	–	0	.473
Western
No. 5 Mississippi State ^{x}‍‍‍^{y}	20	–	10	–	0	.667	52	–	15	–	0	.776
No. 6 Arkansas ^{x}‍‍‍^{y}	20	–	10	–	0	.667	46	–	20	–	0	.697
No. 14 LSU ‍‍‍^{y}	17	–	13	–	0	.567	40	–	26	–	0	.606
No. 20 Texas A&M ‍‍‍^{y}	16	–	13	–	1	.550	39	–	23	–	1	.627
No. 12 Ole Miss ‍‍‍^{y}	16	–	14	–	0	.533	41	–	27	–	0	.603
No. 9 Auburn ‍‍‍^{y}	14	–	16	–	0	.467	38	–	28	–	0	.576
Alabama ‍‍‍	7	–	23	–	0	.233	30	–	26	–	0	.536
x – Division champion † – Conference champion ‡ – Tournament champion y – Invited to the NCAA tournament As of June 25, 2019; Rankings from D1Baseball

The 2019 Missouri Tigers baseball team represented the University of Missouri in the 2019 NCAA Division I baseball season. The Tigers played their home games at Taylor Stadium.

== NCAA Investigation ==
On January 31, 2019, the NCAA gave the Tigers a postseason ban for the 2019 season. The Tigers' football and softball teams were also suspended from postseason play. However, due to an ongoing NCAA investigation, the baseball and softball teams will be eligible for postseason in 2019. The NCAA found that a former University of Missouri tutor violated NCAA tules by completing coursework for 12 student athletes in football, baseball, and softball. The tutor or any of the athletes involved in the investigation were not named in the NCAA's report. The tutor received a 10-year show-cause for her involvement in the penalties. The NCAA issued the following penalties:

- 3 years of probation.
- a 10-year show-cause order for the former tutor. During that period, any NCAA member school employing the tutor must restrict her from any athletically related duties.
- a 2018–19 postseason ban for the baseball and softball programs.
- a 2019–20 postseason ban for the football program.
- a vacation of records in which football, baseball and, softball student-athletes competed while ineligible. The university must provide a written report containing the matches impacted to the NCAA media coordination and statistics staff within 45 days of the public decision release.
- a 5 percent reduction in the amount of scholarships in each of the football, baseball, and softball programs during the 2019–20 academic year.
- Recruiting restrictions for each of the football, baseball, and softball programs during the 2019–20 academic year, including: A 7-week ban on unofficial visits, A 12.5 percent reduction in official visits, A 7-week ban on recruiting communications, A 7-week ban on all off-campus recruiting contacts and evaluations, A 12.5 percent reduction in recruiting-person or evaluation days.
- a disassociation of the tutor.
- a fine of $5,000 plus 1 percent of each of the football, baseball, and softball budgets.

== Preseason ==
=== Preseason All-American teams ===
2nd Team

- Kameron Misner – Outfielder (Perfect Game)
- Kameron Misner – Outfielder (Baseball America)

=== SEC media poll ===
The SEC media poll was released on February 7, 2019 with the Tigers predicted to finish last in the Eastern Division.

Media poll (East)
Predicted finish	Team	Votes (1st place)
1	Vanderbilt	87 (9)
2	Florida	81 (4)
3	Georgia	68 (1)
4	South Carolina	53
5	Tennessee	40
6	Kentucky	30
7	Missouri	26

== Roster ==
2019 Missouri Tigers roster
Pitchers: 4 Tommy Springer – Freshman; 6 Seth Halvorsen – Freshman; 11 Konnor Ash – Sophomore; 12 Tyler LaPlante – Senior; 16 Luke Mann – Freshman; 17 T. J. Sikkema – Junior; 18 Art Joven – Junior; 19 Luke Anderson – Sophomore; 24 Nick Swanson – Freshman; 31 Ian Bedell – Sophomore; 32 Jacob Cantleberry – Junior; 35 Cameron Dulle – (redshirt) Senior; 39 Lukas Veinbergs – Junior; 41 Nick Lommen – Freshman; 42 Cameron Pferrer – Sophomore; 43 Spencer Juergens – Senior; 47 Trey Dillard – Sophomore; 48 Trae Robertson – Freshman; 49 Jordan Gubelman – Senior	Catchers: 5 Tre Morris – Freshman; 20 Chad McDaniel – Sophomore; 21 Jake Matheny – Junior; 26 Trevor Mallett – Senior; Infielders: 3 Paul Gomez – Senior; 7 Chris Cornelius – Junior; 9 Mark Vierling – Sophomore; 13 Cameron Swanger – Freshman; 23 Austin James – Junior; 28 Tony Ortiz – Senior; 40 Peter Zimmerman – Junior	Outfielders: 1 Josh Holt Jr. – Freshman; 2 Thomas Broyles – Sophomore; 8 Connor Brumfield – Senior; 10 Clayton Peterson – Sophomore; 14 Alex Peterson – Sophomore; 22 Cade Bormet – Sophomore; 25 Ty Olejnik – Freshman; 30 Kameron Misner – Junior; 44 Zach Hanna – Senior	Coaching staff: Steve Bieser – Head coach – 3rd year; Lance Rhodes – Assistant coach – 3rd year; Fred Corral – Assistant coach – 2nd year; Jae Fadde – Director of baseball operations – 2nd year; Ryan Johnson – Strength and conditioning coach – 1st year

== Schedule and results ==
Legend
	Missouri win
	Missouri loss
	Postponement
**Bold**	Missouri team member

2019 Missouri Tigers baseball game log
Regular season (18–10–1)

February (5–4–0)
Date	Opponent	Rank	Site/stadium	Score	Win	Loss	Save	TV	Attendance	Overall record	SEC record
Feb. 15	at North Florida		Harmon Stadium; Jacksonville, Florida	**L** 4–5	Nick Marchese (1–0)	**Ian Bedell (0–1)**	Trace Norkus (1)		521	0–1	
Feb. 16	at North Florida		Harmon Stadium	**W** 5–4	**Konnor Ash (1–0)**	Ethan Michaelis (0–1)	**T. J. Sikkema (1)**		621	1–1	
Feb. 17	at North Florida		Harmon Stadium	**L** 2–4	Max McKinley (1–0)	**Lukas Veinbergs (0–1)**	Eddie Miller (1)		449	1–2	
Feb. 19	at Florida A&M		Moore–Kittles Field; Tallahassee, Florida	**W** 5–3	**Cameron Dulle (1–0)**	Josh Barr (0–1)	**Trey Dillard (1)**		186	2–2	
Feb. 21	vs. Northeastern		City of Palms Park; Fort Myers, Florida	**L** 3–4	Josh Winkler (1–0)	**Cameron Dulle (1–1)**	Andrew Misiaszek (2)		103	2–3	–
Feb. 22	vs. Rhode Island		City of Palms Park	**L** 6–8	Tyler Brosius (1–0)	**Trey Dillard (0–1)**	Cam LaFleur (2)		101	2–4	–
Feb. 23	vs. Rhode Island		City of Palms Park	**W** 12–4	**Art Joven (1–0)**	Vitaly Jangols (0–1)			111	3–4	–
Feb. 24	vs. Rhode Island		City of Palms Park	**W** 7–0	**Jacob Cantleberry (1–0)**	Nick Robinson (0–2)			151	4–4	–
Feb. 26	Alabama A&M		Taylor Stadium; Columbia, Missouri	**W** 13–5	**Tommy Springer (1–0)**	Logan Smith (0–1)		SECN+	806	5–4	–

March (13–6–1)
Date	Opponent	Rank	Site/stadium	Score	Win	Loss	Save	TV	Attendance	Overall record	SEC record
Mar. 1	at Central Arkansas		Bear Stadium; Conway, Arkansas	**W** 4–0	**T. J. Sikkema (1–0)**	M. Moyer (1–1)	**Cameron Dulle (1)**		425	6–4	–
Mar. 2	vs. South Dakota State		Bear Stadium	**L** 3–6	Froom (1–1)	**Tyler LaPlante (0–1)**	Carlson (1)		175	6–5	–
Mar. 8	Northwestern		Taylor Stadium	**W** 3–2	**T. J. Sikkema (2–0)**	Lavelle Quinn (1–1)	**Cameron Dulle (2)**	SECN+	717	7–5	–
Mar. 9	Northwestern		Taylor Stadium	**W** 16–11	**Jacob Cantleberry (2–0)**	Christie Hank (0–2)	none	SECN+	753	8–5	–
Mar. 10	Northwestern		Taylor Stadium	**W** 9–4	**Tyler LaPlante (1–1)**	Sam Lawerence (1–2)	**Ian Bedell (1)**	SECN+	676	9–5	–
Mar. 12	Arkansas State		Taylor Stadium	**W** 16–1	**Jordan Gubelman (1–0)**	Zach Jarrard (1–2)	none	SECN+	605	10–5	–
Mar. 13	Arkansas State		Taylor Stadium	**W** 14–4^{7}	**Konnor Ash (2–0)**	Zachary Patterson (2–1)	none	SECN+	521	11–5	–
Mar. 15	at No. 14 Arkansas		Baum–Walker Stadium; Fayetteville, Arkansas	**L** 0–2	Isaiah Campbell (4–0)	**Jacob Cantleberry (2–1)**	Matt Cronin (5)	SECN+	8,150	11–6	0–1
Mar. 16	at No. 14 Arkansas		Baum–Walker Stadium	**L** 3–4	Kole Ramage (4–0)	**T. J. Sikkema (2–1)**	Matt Cronin (6)	SECN+	9,521	11–7	0–2
Mar. 17	at No. 14 Arkansas		Baum–Walker Stadium	**L** 2–3	Jacob Kostyshock (1–1)	**Cameron Dulle (1–2)**	none	SECN+	9,281	11–8	0–3
Mar. 19	Murray State		Taylor Stadium	**W** 2–1	**Jordan Gubelman (2–0)**	Braydon Cook (0–1)	none	SECN+	710	12–8	–
Mar. 20	Murray State		Taylor Stadium	**W** 13–1	**Trae Robertson (1–0)**	Jordan Cozart (0–3)	none	SECN+	690	13–8	–
Mar. 22	No. 18 Ole Miss		Taylor Stadium	**W** 2–1	**Jacob Cantleberry (3–1)**	Will Ethridge (4–1)	**Cameron Dulle (3)**	SECN	1,086	14–8	1–3
Mar. 23	No. 18 Ole Miss		Taylor Stadium	**L** 0–3	Doug Nikhazy (2–2)	**T. J. Sikkema (2–2)**	Parker Caracci (4)	SECN	809	14–9	1–4
Mar. 24	No. 18 Ole Miss		Taylor Stadium	**W** 8–5	**Ian Bedell (1–1)**	Connor Green (3–2)	**Jordan Gubelman (1)**	SECN	880	15–9	2–4
Mar. 26	at UTSA		Roadrunner Field; San Antonio, Texas	**W** 12–11^{12}	**Trey Dillard (1–1)**	Cameron Carver (0–2)	**Art Joven (1)**		391	16–9	–
Mar. 27	at Incarnate Word		Sullivan Field; San Antonio, Texas	**W** 11–7	**Art Jovan (2–0)**	Tyler Perez (0–1)	**Ian Bedell (2)**		270	17–9	–
Mar. 29	at No. 10 Texas A&M		Olsen Field at Blue Bell Park; College Station, Texas	**L** 3–7	Bryce Miller (4–0)	**Cameron Dulle (1–3)**	none	SECN+	6,587	17–10	2–5
Mar. 30	at No. 10 Texas A&M		Olsen Field at Blue Bell Park	**W** 3–2^{15}	**Ian Bedell (2–1)**	Chandler Jozwiak (3–2)	**T. J. Sikkema (2)**	SECN+	5,533	18–10	3–5
Mar. 31	at No. 10 Texas A&M		Olsen Field at Blue Bell Park	**T** 2–2^{10}	none	none	none	SECN+	5,115	18–10–1	3–5–1

April (13–5–0)
Date	Opponent	Rank	Site/stadium	Score	Win	Loss	Save	TV	Attendance	Overall record	SEC record
April 2	Saint Louis		Taylor Stadium	**W** 4–3	**Cameron Dulle (2–3)**	Ryan Lefner (2–3)		SECN+	723	19–10–1	–
April 3	Kansas State		Taylor Stadium	**W** 17–2	**Tommy Springer (2–0)**	Kasey Ford (0–2)		SECN+	664	20–10–1	–
April 5	Kentucky		Taylor Stadium	**L** 2–4	Cole Daniels (3–0)	**Jacob Cantleberry (3–2)**	Carson Coleman (2)	SECN+	905	20–11–1	3–6–1
April 6	Kentucky		Taylor Stadium	**W** 5–4	**Cameron Dulle (3–3)**	Cole Ayers (0–1)		SECN+	1,627	21–11–1	4–6–1
April 7	Kentucky		Taylor Stadium	**W** 9–2	**T. J. Sikkema (3–2)**	Braxton Cottongame (0–1)		SECN+	1,020	22–11–1	5–6–1
April 9	at SIU Edwardsville		Roy E. Lee Field; Edwardsville, Illinois	**W** 10–3	**Tommy Springer (3–0)**	M. Shereyk (1–1)			523	23–11–1	–
April 12	No. 8 LSU		Taylor Stadium	**L** 11–12^{10}	Todd Peterson (3–2)	**Jordan Gubelman (2–1)**	Devin Fontenot (3)	SECN+	1,408	23–12–1	5–7–1
April 13	No. 8 LSU		Taylor Stadium	**W** 4–1	**T. J. Sikkema (4–2)**	Cole Henry (3–2)	**Ian Bedell (3)**	SECN+	1,725	24–12–1	6–7–1
April 14	No. 8 LSU		Taylor Stadium	**W** 11–5	**Art Joven (3–0)**	Eric Walker (2–3)		SECN	1,002	25–12–1	7–7–1
April 16	at Missouri State	No. 21	Hammons Field; Springfield, Missouri	**W** 14–6	**Trae Robertson (2–0)**	N. Schmidt (0–2)			2,903	26–12–1	–
April 18	at No. 5 Georgia	No. 21	Foley Field; Athens, Georgia	**L** 0–3	Hancock (7–2)	**Jacob Cantleberry (3–3)**	Kristofak (4)	ESPNU	2,553	26–13–1	7–8–1
April 19	at No. 5 Georgia	No. 21	Foley Field	**L** 2–5	Wilcox (1–0)	**Art Joven (3–1)**	Schunk (11)	SECN+		26–14–1	7–9–1
April 20	at No. 5 Georgia	No. 21	Foley Field	**L** 2–4	Locey (7–0)	**T. J. Sikkema (4–3)**	Kristofak (5)	SECN+	2,860	26–15–1	7–10–1
April 23	Missouri State		Taylor Stadium	**W** 6–2	**Tommy Springer (4–0)**	Hayden Juenger (2–3)		SECN	950	27–15–1	–
April 26	South Carolina		Taylor Stadium	**W** 5–2	**Jacob Cantleberry (4–3)**	Reid Morgan (3–4)	**Ian Bedell (4)**	SECN+	1,216	28–15–1	8–10–1
April 27	South Carolina		Taylor Stadium	**W** 11–0	**T. J. Sikkema (5–3)**	Cam Tringali (2–2)		SECN+	1,345	29–15–1	9–10–1
April 28	South Carolina		Taylor Stadium	**W** 9–7^{7}	**Cameron Dulle (4–3)**	Swayer Bridges (2–1)		SECN+	920	30–15–1	10–10–1
April 30	Southeast Missouri State	No. 24	Taylor Stadium	**W** 21–6	**Luke Anderson (1–0)**	Daniel Bergtholdt (4–5)		SECN	814	31–15–1	–

May (3–6–0)
Date	Opponent	Rank	Site/stadium	Score	Win	Loss	Save	TV	Attendance	Overall record	SEC record
May 3	at No. 23 Tennessee	No. 24	Lindsey Nelson Stadium; Knoxville, Tennessee	**L** 5–11	S. Hunley (4–0)	**Konnor Ash (2–1)**	Walsh (8)	SECN+	2,385	31–16–1	10–11–1
May 4	at No. 23 Tennessee	No. 24	Lindsey Nelson Stadium	**W** 6–2	**Ian Bedell (3–1)**	G. Crochet (3–3)	**Cameron Dulle (4)**	SECN	1,844	32–16–1	11–11–1
May 5	at No. 23 Tennessee	No. 24	Lindsey Nelson Stadium	**W** 10–8	**T. J. Sikkema (6–3)**	Sewell (4–1)		SECN+	2,243	33–16–1	12–11–1
May 10	at No. 2 Vanderbilt	No. 21	Hawkins Field; Nashville, Tennessee	**L** 2–5	Drake Fellows (10–0)	**Jacob Cantleberry (4–4)**	Tyler Brown (12)	SECN+	3,626	33–17–1	12–12–1
May 11	at No. 2 Vanderbilt	No. 21	Hawkins Field	**W** 5–2	**T. J. Sikkema (7–3)**	Kumar Rocker (6–5)	**Ian Bedell (5)**	SECN+	3,262	34–17–1	13–12–1
May 12	at No. 2 Vanderbilt	No. 21	Hawkins Field	**L** 2–7	Raby (9–1)	**Trey Dillard (1–2)**	Fisher (4)	SECN+	3,154	34–18–1	13–13–1
May 16	Florida	No. 24	Taylor Stadium	**L** 4–5	Tommy Mace (8–4)	**Konnor Ash (2–2)**	Jordan Buler (1)	SECN+	2,310	34–19–1	13–14–1
May 17	Florida	No. 24	Taylor Stadium	**L** 0–2	Jack Leftwich (5–5)	**T. J. Sikkema (7–4)**		SECN+	3,182	34–20–1	13–15–1
May 18	Florida	No. 24	Taylor Stadium	**L** 3–4	Christian Scott (6–3)	**Cameron Dulle (4–4)**		SECN+	1,675	34–21–1	13–16–1

Postseason (0–1)

SEC Tournament (0–0)
Date	Opponent	Seed/Rank	Site/stadium	Score	Win	Loss	Save	TV	Attendance	Overall record	SECT Record
May 21	vs. (7) Ole Miss	(10)	Hoover Metropolitan Stadium; Hoover, Alabama	**L** 1–2	Ethridge (6–6)	**Jacob Cantleberry (4–5)**	Ryan Olenek (2)	SEC Network	4,135	34–22–1	0–1

† Indicates the game does not count toward the 2019 Southeastern Conference standings.
*Rankings are based on the team's current ranking in the D1Baseball poll.

== Record vs. conference opponents ==
Last two do not qualify for conf. tourn. Blank are not scheduled. Blue are home games, otherwise away.

2019 SEC baseball records Source: 2019 SEC baseball game results
Team	W–L	ALA	ARK	AUB	FLA	UGA	KEN	LSU	MSU	MIZZ	MISS	SCAR	TENN	TAMU	VAN	Team	Div	SR	SW
ALA	7–23		1–2	1–2	0–3	0–3	.	1–2	0–3	.	1–2	2–1	.	1–2	0–3	ALA	W7	1–9	0–4
ARK	20–10	2–1		2–1	.	.	2–1	3–0	2–1	3–0	1–2	.	3–0	1–2	1–2	ARK	W1	7–3	3–0
AUB	14–16	2–1	1–2		.	1–2	.	1–2	1–2	.	2–1	2–1	3–0	1–2	0–3	AUB	W6	4–6	1–1
FLA	13–17	3–0	.	.		0–3	2–1	1–2	1–2	3–0	0–3	2–1	1–2	.	0–3	FLA	E5	4–6	2–3
UGA	21–9	3–0	.	2–1	3–0		2–1	2–1	0–3	3–0	.	3–0	1–2	.	2–1	UGA	E2	8–2	4–1
KEN	7–23	.	1–2	.	1–2	1–2		0–3	.	1–2	2–1	1–2	0–3	0–3	0–3	KEN	E7	1–9	0–4
LSU	17–13	2–1	0–3	2–1	2–1	1–2	3–0		3–0	1–2	1–2	.	.	2–1	.	LSU	W3	6–4	2–1
MSU	20–10	3–0	1–2	2–1	2–1	3–0	.	0–3		.	3–0	2–1	2–1	2–1	.	MSU	W2	8–2	3–1
MIZZ	13–16	.	0–3	.	0–3	0–3	2–1	2–1	.		2–1	3–0	2–1	1–1	1–2	MIZZ	E4	5–4	1–3
MISS	16–14	2–1	2–1	1–2	3–0	.	1–2	2–1	0–3	1–2		.	1–2	3–0	.	MISS	W5	5–5	2–1
SCAR	8–22	1–2	.	1–2	1–2	0–3	2–1	.	1–2	0–3	.		1–2	1–2	0–3	SCAR	E6	1–9	0–3
TENN	14–16	.	0–3	0–3	2–1	2–1	3–0	.	1–2	1–2	2–1	2–1		.	1–2	TENN	E3	5–5	1–2
TAMU	16–13	2–1	2–1	2–1	.	.	3–0	1–2	1–2	1–1	0–3	2–1	.		2–1	TAMU	W4	6–3	1–1
VAN	23–7	3–0	2–1	3–0	3–0	1–2	3–0	.	.	2–1	.	3–0	2–1	1–2		VAN	E1	8–2	5–0
Team	W–L	ALA	ARK	AUB	FLA	UGA	KEN	LSU	MSU	MIZZ	MISS	SCAR	TENN	TAMU	VAN	Team	Div	SR	SW

Updated for entire regular season. Missouri at Texas A&M series had one tie game.

== Rankings ==
Ranking movements Legend: ██ Increase in ranking ██ Decrease in ranking
	Week																	
Poll	Pre	1	2	3	4	5	6	7	8	9	10	11	12	13	14	15	16	Final
Coaches'		*										25	22	23				
Baseball America												24	20	21				
NCBWA†										27		29	23	24				
D1Baseball										21		24	21	24				

† NCBWA ranks 30 teams in their preseason poll, but only ranks 25 teams weekly during the season.
* A new poll was not released for this week, so for comparison purposes, the previous week's ranking is inserted in this week's slot.
