= 2019 Georgia Bulldogs baseball team =

American college baseball season

2019 Georgia Bulldogs baseball

Athens Regional, 2–2
- Conference: Southeastern Conference
- Eastern Division

Ranking
- Coaches: No. 15
- CB: No. 17
- Record: 46–17 (21–9 SEC)
- Head coach: Scott Stricklin (6th season)
- Assistant coaches: Scott Daeley; Sean Kenny
- Home stadium: Foley Field

2019 Southeastern Conference baseball standings
	Conf.						Overall
Team	W		L		T	PCT	W		L		T	PCT
Eastern
No. 1 Vanderbilt ^{x}‍†‍‡‍^{y}	23	–	7	–	0	.767	58	–	12	–	0	.829
No. 18 Georgia ‍‍‍^{y}	21	–	9	–	0	.700	46	–	17	–	0	.730
Tennessee ‍‍‍^{y}	14	–	16	–	0	.467	40	–	21	–	0	.656
Missouri ‍‍‍	13	–	16	–	1	.450	34	–	22	–	1	.605
Florida ‍‍‍^{y}	13	–	17	–	0	.433	34	–	26	–	0	.567
South Carolina ‍‍‍	8	–	22	–	0	.267	28	–	28	–	0	.500
Kentucky ‍‍‍	7	–	23	–	0	.233	26	–	29	–	0	.473
Western
No. 5 Mississippi State ^{x}‍‍‍^{y}	20	–	10	–	0	.667	52	–	15	–	0	.776
No. 6 Arkansas ^{x}‍‍‍^{y}	20	–	10	–	0	.667	46	–	20	–	0	.697
No. 14 LSU ‍‍‍^{y}	17	–	13	–	0	.567	40	–	26	–	0	.606
No. 20 Texas A&M ‍‍‍^{y}	16	–	13	–	1	.550	39	–	23	–	1	.627
No. 12 Ole Miss ‍‍‍^{y}	16	–	14	–	0	.533	41	–	27	–	0	.603
No. 9 Auburn ‍‍‍^{y}	14	–	16	–	0	.467	38	–	28	–	0	.576
Alabama ‍‍‍	7	–	23	–	0	.233	30	–	26	–	0	.536
x – Division champion † – Conference champion ‡ – Tournament champion y – Invited to the NCAA tournament As of June 25, 2019; Rankings from D1Baseball

The 2019 Georgia Bulldogs baseball team represented the University of Georgia in the 2019 NCAA Division I baseball season. The Bulldogs played their home games at Foley Field.

== Preseason ==
=== Preseason All-American teams ===
3rd Team

- Aaron Schunk – Utility Player (Baseball America)

=== SEC media poll ===
The SEC media poll was released on February 7, 2019 with the Bulldogs predicted to finish in third place in the Eastern Division.

Media poll (East)
Predicted finish	Team	Votes (1st place)
1	Vanderbilt	87 (9)
2	Florida	81 (4)
3	Georgia	68 (1)
4	South Carolina	53
5	Tennessee	40
6	Kentucky	30
7	Missouri	26

=== Preseason All-SEC teams ===
1st Team

- Aaron Schunk – Third Baseman

2nd Team

- Mason Meadows – Catcher
- LJ Talley – Second Baseman
- Aaron Schunk – Designated Hitter/Utility

== Roster ==
2019 Georgia Bulldogs roster
Pitchers: 5 C.J. Smith – Sophomore; 11 Will Proctor – Junior; 12 Zac Kristofak – Junior; 13 Cole Wilcox – Freshman; 16 Adam Goodman – Senior; 17 Emerson Hancock – Sophomore; 18 James Williams – (redshirt) Sophomore; 19 Jack Gowen – Freshman; 21 Logan Moody – (redshirt) Junior; 25 Tony Locey – Junior; 26 Christian Ryder – Junior; 27 Trevor Tinder – (redshirt) Junior; 33 Justin Glover – Junior; 35 Hunter Goodwin – Freshman; 39 Darryn Pasqua – Sophomore; 43 Riley Crean – Freshman; 44 Tim Elliott – Junior; 45 Garrett Brown – Freshman; 50 Ryan Avidano – (redshirt) Junior; 55 Ryan Webb – Sophomore	Catchers: 6 Kaden Fowler – Junior; 8 Austin Biggar – Junior; 30 Mason Meadows – (redshirt) Sophomore; 32 Shane Marshall – Freshman; 42 John Cable – Graduate; Infielders: 2 LJ Talley – Senior; 7 Cam Shepherd – Junior; 14 Patrick Sullivan – (redshirt) Junior; 15 Cole Tate – Sophomore; 22 Aaron Schunk – Junior; 23 Connor Tate – (redshirt) Freshman; 31 Riley King – (redshirt) Sophomore; 41 Steven Minter – (redshirt) Freshman	Outfielders: 1 Tucker Maxwell – Junior; 4 Randon Jernigan – Freshman; 20 Chaney Rogers – (redshirt) Freshman; 28 Tucker Bradley – Junior; 36 Ben Anderson – Sophomore

== Schedule and results ==
Legend
	Georgia win
	Georgia loss
	Postponement
**Bold**	Georgia team member

2019 Georgia Bulldogs baseball game log
Regular season (42–14)

February (7–1)
Date	Opponent	Rank	Site/stadium	Score	Win	Loss	Save	TV	Attendance	Overall record	SEC record
Feb. 15	Dayton	No. 9	Foley Field; Athens, Georgia	5–1	**Emerson Hancock (1–0)**	Hunter Wolfe (0–1)	**Ryan Webb (1)**	SECN+	2,056	1–0	
Feb. 16 (1)	Dayton	No. 9	Foley Field	10–7	**Will Proctor (1–0)**	Aaron Ernst (0–1)	**Aaron Schunk (1)**	SECN+	3,204	2–0	
Feb. 16 (2)	Dayton	No. 9	Foley Field	13–1	**Tony Locey (1–0)**	Cole Pletka (0–1)		SECN+	3,204	3–0	
Feb. 19	at Kennesaw State	No. 9	Stillwell Baseball Stadium; Kennesaw, Georgia	**Cancelled due to weather.**							
Feb. 23	UMass Lowell	No. 9	Foley Field	**W** 6–2	**Emerson Hancock (2–0)**	Nick Rand (0–2)		SECN+	1,917	4–0	
Feb. 24 (1)	UMass Lowell	No. 9	Foley Field	**W** 13–5	**Will Proctor (2–0)**	Henry Funaro (0–2)		SECN+	2,006 (DH)	5–0	
Feb. 24 (2)	UMass Lowell	No. 9	Foley Field	**W** 12–5	**Tony Locey (2–0)**	Sean O'Neill (0–1)		SECN+	2,006 (DH)	6–0	
Feb. 26	LIU Brooklyn	No. 9	Foley Field	**L** 0–1	Jackson Svete (1–0)	**Tim Elliott (0–1)**	Nick Torres (1)	SECN+	1,548	6–1	
Feb. 27	Kennesaw State	No. 9	Foley Field	**W** 11–1	**C.J. Smith (1–0)**	Jake Rothwell (0–2)		SECN+	1,649	7–1	

March (16–4)
Date	Opponent	Rank	Site/stadium	Score	Win	Loss	Save	TV	Attendance	Overall record	SEC record
Mar. 1	at Georgia Southern	No. 9	J. I. Clements Stadium; Statesboro, Georgia	**W** 3–1	**Emerson Hancock (3–0)**	Seth Shuman (0–3)	**Aaron Schunk (2)**	ESPN+	2,247	8–1	
Mar. 2	at Georgia Southern	No. 9	J. I. Clements Stadium	**W** 4–2	**Zac Kristofak (1–0)**	Braden Hays (0–2)	**Aaron Schunk (3)**	ESPN+	2,916	9–1	
Mar. 3	at Georgia Southern	No. 9	J. I. Clements Stadium	**L** 7–10	David Johnson (1–0)	**Jack Gowen (0–1)**	Hayden Harris (1)	ESPN+	1,554	9–2	
Mar. 5	Alabama State	No. 9	Foley Field	**W** 11–3	**Tim Elliott (1–1)**	AJ Stinson (0–2)		SECN+	1,379	10–2	
Mar. 6	Jacksonville State	No. 9	Foley Field	**W** 5–1	**C.J. Smith (2–0)**	Jackson Tavel (2–1)	**Aaron Schunk (4)**	SECN+	1,352	11–2	
Mar. 8	Presbyterian	No. 9	Foley Field	**W** 17–0	**Emerson Hancock (4–0)**	Eric Miles (1–1)		SECN+	1,415	12–2	
Mar. 9 (1)	Presbyterian	No. 9	Foley Field	**W** 7–6	**Zac Kristofak (2–0)**	Colton Springs (1–1)	**Aaron Schunk (5)**	SECN+	1,960 (DH)	13–2	
Mar. 9 (2)	Presbyterian	No. 9	Foley Field	**W** 8–1	**Tony Locey (3–0)**	Reagan Fowler (0–3)		SECN+	1,960 (DH)	14–2	
Mar. 13	at Georgia State	No. 8	Georgia State Baseball Complex; Atlanta, Georgia	**W** 6–3	**Tim Elliott (2–1)**	Tyler Koch (0–2)	**Aaron Schunk (6)**		392	15–2	
Mar. 15	at No. 22 South Carolina	No. 8	Founders Park; Columbia, South Carolina	**W** 6–1	**Emerson Hancock (5–0)**	Wesley Sweatt (1–1)		SECN+	6,435	16–2	1–0
Mar. 16	at No. 22 South Carolina	No. 8	Founders Park	**W** 8–7	**Will Proctor (3–0)**	Daniel Lloyd (2–1)	**Aaron Schunk (7)**	SECN+	7,210	17–2	2–0
Mar. 17	at No. 22 South Carolina	No. 8	Founders Park	**W** 4–2	**Zac Kristofak (3–0)**	Brett Kerry (2–1)		SECN+	6,539	18–2	3–0
Mar. 19	Georgia State	No. 5	Foley Field	**W** 11–1	**Tim Elliott (3–1)**	Grant Gaspard (0–1)		SECN+	1,814	19–2	
Mar. 22	No. 10 LSU	No. 5	Foley Field	**L** 0–1	Zack Hess (2–1)	**Emerson Hancock (5–1)**	Devin Fontenot (1)	SECN+	3,209	19–3	3–1
Mar. 23	No. 10 LSU	No. 5	Foley Field	**W** 2–0	**Justin Glover (1–0)**	Cole Henry (1–1)	**Aaron Schunk (8)**	SECN	3,344	20–3	4–1
Mar. 24	No. 10 LSU	No. 5	Foley Field	**W** 9–7	**Tony Locey (4–0)**	Eric Walker (1–1)	**Aaron Schunk (9)**	SECN	3,042	21–3	5–1
Mar. 26	at Georgia Tech	No. 4	Russ Chandler Stadium; Atlanta, Georgia	**L** 2–11	Amos Willingham (4–0)	**Adam Goodman (0–1)**			1,974	21–4	
Mar. 28	at Kentucky	No. 4	Kentucky Proud Park; Lexington, Kentucky	**W** 7–3	**Emerson Hancock (6–1)**	Jimmy Ramsey (2–2)		SECN	3,292	22–4	6–1
Mar. 29	at Kentucky	No. 4	Kentucky Proud Park	**L** 0–5	Zack Thompson (2–0)	**C.J. Smith (2–1)**		SECN+	3,124	22–5	6–2
Mar. 30	at Kentucky	No. 4	Kentucky Proud Park	**W** 10–8	**Aaron Schunk (1–0)**	Daniel Harper (2–1)		SECN+	3,134	23–5	7–2

April (11–7)
Date	Opponent	Rank	Site/stadium	Score	Win	Loss	Save	TV	Attendance	Overall record	SEC record
April 2	at No. 23 Clemson	No. 4	Doug Kingsmore Stadium; Clemson, South Carolina	**W** 5–3	**Tim Elliott (4–1)**	Brooks Crawford (1–2)	**Aaron Schunk (10)**		5,170	24–5	
April 3	Kennesaw State	No. 4	Foley Field	**W** 7–6	**Adam Goodman (1–1)**	Jared Rine (1–3)	**Zac Kristofak (1)**		1,402	25–5	
April 5	No. 5 Vanderbilt	No. 4	Foley Field	**L** 2–3	Tyler Brown (1–0)	**Aaron Schunk (1–1)**		SECN+	3,188	25–6	7–3
April 6	No. 5 Vanderbilt	No. 4	Foley Field	**W** 8–3	**C.J. Smith (3–1)**	Patrick Raby (5–1)		SECN+	3,117	26–6	8–3
April 7	No. 5 Vanderbilt	No. 4	Foley Field	**W** 3–1	**Tony Locey (5–0)**	Kumar Rocker (2–4)	**Zac Kristofak (2)**	SECN	3,045	27–6	9–3
April 9	No. 17 Georgia Tech	No. 2	Foley Field	**W** 12–2	**Tim Elliott (5–1)**	Amos Willingham (4–2)		SECN	3,009	28–6	
April 11	at Tennessee	No. 2	Lindsey Nelson Stadium; Knoxville, Tennessee	**L** 0–2	Andrew Schultz (1–0)	**Emerson Hancock (6–2)**	Redmond Walsh (5)	SECN	1,994	28–7	9–4
April 12	at Tennessee	No. 2	Lindsey Nelson Stadium	**L** 0–3	Garrett Stallings (6–2)	**C.J. Smith (3–2)**		SECN+	2,765	28–8	9–5
April 13	at Tennessee	No. 2	Lindsey Nelson Stadium	**W** 7–1	**Tony Locey (6–0)**	Zach Linginfelter (5–4)	**Zac Kristofak (3)**	SECN+	3,311	29–8	10–5
April 16	No. 24 Clemson	No. 5	Foley Field	**W** 3–2	**Darryn Pasqua (1–0)**	Luke Sommerfeld (0–1)		SECN	3,419	30–8	
April 18	No. 21 Missouri	No. 5	Foley Field	**W** 3–0	**Emerson Hancock (7–2)**	Jacob Cantleberry (3–3)	**Zac Kristofak (4)**	ESPNU	2,553	31–8	11–5
April 19	No. 21 Missouri	No. 5	Foley Field	**W** 5–2	**Cole Wilcox (1–0)**	Art Joven (3–1)	**Aaron Schunk (11)**	SECN+	2,962	32–8	12–5
April 20	No. 21 Missouri	No. 5	Foley Field	**W** 4–2	**Tony Locey (7–0)**	TJ Sikkema (4–3)	**Zac Kristofak (5)**	SECN+	2,860	33–8	13–5
April 23	vs. No. 11 Georgia Tech	No. 4	SunTrust Park; Atlanta, Georgia	**L** 6–8	Hugh Chapman (1–0)	**Tim Elliott (5–2)**	Tristin English (5)	SECN+	18,861	33–9	
April 26	at No. 9 Mississippi State	No. 4	Dudy Noble Field; Starkville, Mississippi	**L** 3–19	Ethan Small (5–1)	**C.J. Smith (3–3)**		SECN+	9,061	33–10	13–6
April 27	at No. 9 Mississippi State	No. 4	Dudy Noble Field	**L** 3–9	JT Ginn (8–2)	**Tony Locey (7–1)**		SECN	9,572	33–11	13–7
April 28	at No. 9 Mississippi State	No. 4	Dudy Noble Field	**L** 5–6	Peyton Plumlee (3–3)	**Tim Elliott (5–3)**		SECN+	8,204	33–12	13–8
April 30	vs. The Citadel	No. 9	SRP Park; North Augusta, South Carolina	**W** 9–0	**Logan Moody (1–0)**	Alex Bialakis (0–5)			3,602	34–12	

May (8–2)
Date	Opponent	Rank	Site/stadium	Score	Win	Loss	Save	TV	Attendance	Overall record	SEC record
May 3	Florida	No. 9	Foley Field	**W** 6–4	**Tony Locey (8–1)**	Tommy Mace (7–4)	**Zac Kristofak (6)**	SECN+	3,106	35–12	14–8
May 5 (1)	Florida	No. 9	Foley Field	**W** 9–1	**Tim Elliott (6–3)**	Jack Leftwich (4–5)		ESPN2	2,807	36–12	15–8
May 5 (2)	Florida	No. 9	Foley Field	**W** 4–1	**Cole Wilcox (2–0)**	Nolan Crisp (3–2)		SECN+	2,845	37–12	16–8
May 8	at Jacksonville State	No. 8	Rudy Abbott Field; Jacksonville, Alabama	**L** 8–9	Cody Willingham (1–1)	**Aaron Schunk (1–2)**		ESPN+	1,527	37–13	
May 10	at Auburn	No. 8	Plainsman Park; Auburn, Alabama	**W** 11–2	**Tony Locey (9–1)**	Jack Owen (4–1)		SECN+	3,703	38–13	17–8
May 11 (1)	at Auburn	No. 8	Plainsman Park	**L** 3–4	Cody Greenhill (2–2)	**Cole Wilcox (2–1)**		SECN+	3,361	38–14	17–9
May 11 (2)	at Auburn	No. 8	Plainsman Park	**W** 10–8	**Zac Kristofak (4–0)**	Blake Schilleci (0–2)		SECN+	3,340	39–14	18–9
May 16	Alabama	No. 7	Foley Field	**W** 9–4	**Cole Wilcox (3–1)**	Tyler Ras (1–3)		SECN+	3,006	40–14	19–9
May 17	Alabama	No. 7	Foley Field	**W** 12–2	**Tony Locey (10–1)**	Brock Love (5–5)		SECN+	3,093	41–14	20–9
May 18	Alabama	No. 7	Foley Field	**W** 9–1	**Emerson Hancock (8–2)**	Sam Finnerty (6–8)		SECN+	3,010	42–14	21–9

Postseason (4–3)

SEC Tournament (2–1)
Date	Opponent	Seed/Rank	Site/stadium	Score	Win	Loss	Save	TV	Attendance	Overall record	SECT Record
May 22	vs. No. 13 Texas A&M	No. 7	Hoover Metropolitan Stadium; Hoover, Alabama	**W** 2–0	**Zac Kristofak (5–0)**	Joseph Menefree (3–2)		SECN	5,264	43–14	1–0
May 23	vs. No. 5 Arkansas	No. 7	Hoover Metropolitan Stadium	**W** 3–1	**Ryan Webb (1–0)**	Jacob Kostyshock (1–3)	**Aaron Schunk (12)**	SECN	8,620	44–14	2–0
May 25	vs. No. 22 Ole Miss	No. 7	Hoover Metropolitan Stadium	**L** 3–5	Max Cioffi (2–2)	**Tony Locey (10–2)**	Parker Caracci (11)	SECN	12,872	44–15	2–1

Athens Regional (2–2)
Date	Opponent	Seed/Rank	Site/stadium	Score	Win	Loss	Save	TV	Attendance	Overall record	Regional Record
May 31	(4) Mercer	No. 7 (1)	Foley Field	**W** 13–3	**Tony Locey (11–2)**	Tanner Hall (8–6)		SECN	3,256	45–15	1–0
June 1	(3) Florida State	No. 7 (1)	Foley Field	**L** 3–12	CJ Van Eyk (10–3)	**Emerson Hancock (8–3)**		ESPN2	3,046	45–16	1–1
June 2	(2) Florida Atlantic	No. 7 (1)	Foley Field	**W** 13–0	**Tim Elliott (7–3)**	Mike Ruff (6–5)		SECN	2,773	46–16	2–1
June 3	(3) Florida State	No. 7 (1)	Foley Field	**L** 1–10	Conor Grady (9–5)	**Cole Wilcox (3–2)**		ESPNU	2,996	46–17	2–2

Schedule source:

*Rankings are based on the team's current ranking in the D1Baseball poll.

== Athens Regional ==
Athens Regional Teams
(1) Georgia Bulldogs	(2) Florida Atlantic Owls	(3) Florida State Seminoles	(4) Mercer Bears

First Round
1	Georgia	13
4	Mercer	3
3	Florida State	13
2	Florida Atlantic	7
Lower round 1
4	Mercer	6
2	Florida Atlantic	10

Semi-Finals
1	Georgia	3
3	Florida State	12
Lower final
1	Georgia	13
2	Florida Atlantic	0

Finals
3	Florida State
1	Georgia

== Record vs. conference opponents ==
Last two do not qualify for conf. tourn. Blank are not scheduled. Blue are home games, otherwise away.

2019 SEC baseball records Source: 2019 SEC baseball game results
Team	W–L	ALA	ARK	AUB	FLA	UGA	KEN	LSU	MSU	MIZZ	MISS	SCAR	TENN	TAMU	VAN	Team	Div	SR	SW
ALA	7–23		1–2	1–2	0–3	0–3	.	1–2	0–3	.	1–2	2–1	.	1–2	0–3	ALA	W7	1–9	0–4
ARK	20–10	2–1		2–1	.	.	2–1	3–0	2–1	3–0	1–2	.	3–0	1–2	1–2	ARK	W1	7–3	3–0
AUB	14–16	2–1	1–2		.	1–2	.	1–2	1–2	.	2–1	2–1	3–0	1–2	0–3	AUB	W6	4–6	1–1
FLA	13–17	3–0	.	.		0–3	2–1	1–2	1–2	3–0	0–3	2–1	1–2	.	0–3	FLA	E5	4–6	2–3
UGA	21–9	3–0	.	2–1	3–0		2–1	2–1	0–3	3–0	.	3–0	1–2	.	2–1	UGA	E2	8–2	4–1
KEN	7–23	.	1–2	.	1–2	1–2		0–3	.	1–2	2–1	1–2	0–3	0–3	0–3	KEN	E7	1–9	0–4
LSU	17–13	2–1	0–3	2–1	2–1	1–2	3–0		3–0	1–2	1–2	.	.	2–1	.	LSU	W3	6–4	2–1
MSU	20–10	3–0	1–2	2–1	2–1	3–0	.	0–3		.	3–0	2–1	2–1	2–1	.	MSU	W2	8–2	3–1
MIZZ	13–16	.	0–3	.	0–3	0–3	2–1	2–1	.		2–1	3–0	2–1	1–1	1–2	MIZZ	E4	5–4	1–3
MISS	16–14	2–1	2–1	1–2	3–0	.	1–2	2–1	0–3	1–2		.	1–2	3–0	.	MISS	W5	5–5	2–1
SCAR	8–22	1–2	.	1–2	1–2	0–3	2–1	.	1–2	0–3	.		1–2	1–2	0–3	SCAR	E6	1–9	0–3
TENN	14–16	.	0–3	0–3	2–1	2–1	3–0	.	1–2	1–2	2–1	2–1		.	1–2	TENN	E3	5–5	1–2
TAMU	16–13	2–1	2–1	2–1	.	.	3–0	1–2	1–2	1–1	0–3	2–1	.		2–1	TAMU	W4	6–3	1–1
VAN	23–7	3–0	2–1	3–0	3–0	1–2	3–0	.	.	2–1	.	3–0	2–1	1–2		VAN	E1	8–2	5–0
Team	W–L	ALA	ARK	AUB	FLA	UGA	KEN	LSU	MSU	MIZZ	MISS	SCAR	TENN	TAMU	VAN	Team	Div	SR	SW

Updated for entire regular season. Missouri at Texas A&M series had one tie game.

== Rankings ==
Ranking movements
	Week																			
Poll	Pre	1	2	3	4	5	6	7	8	9	10	11	12	13	14	15	16	17	18	Final
Coaches'	13	13*																		
Baseball America	15																			
Collegiate Baseball^	13																			
NCBWA†	12																			

^ Collegiate Baseball ranked 40 teams in their preseason poll, but only ranked 30 teams weekly during the season.
† NCBWA ranks 30 teams in their preseason poll, but only ranks 25 teams weekly during the season.
* A new poll was not released for this week, so for comparison purposes, the previous week's ranking is inserted in this week's slot.

== 2019 MLB draft ==
Player	Position	Round	Overall	MLB team
Aaron Schunk	3B	2	62	Colorado Rockies
Tony Locey	RHP	3	96	St. Louis Cardinals
Tim Elliot	RHP	4	126	Seattle Mariners
LJ Talley	2B	7	207	Toronto Blue Jays
Zac Kristofak	RHP	14	421	Los Angeles Angels
Cam Sheperd	SS	20	608	Tampa Bay Rays
Tucker Maxwell	OF	22	660	Atlanta Braves
Riley King	OF/IF	26	787	Atlanta Braves
