= 2019 Kentucky Wildcats baseball team =

2019 season of University of Kentucky baseball team

2019 Kentucky Wildcats baseball
- Conference: Southeastern Conference
- Eastern Division
- Record: 26–29 (7–23 SEC)
- Head coach: Nick Mingione (3rd season)
- Assistant coaches: Jim Belanger; Roland Fanning
- Home stadium: Kentucky Proud Park

2019 Southeastern Conference baseball standings
	Conf.						Overall
Team	W		L		T	PCT	W		L		T	PCT
Eastern
No. 1 Vanderbilt ^{x}‍†‍‡‍^{y}	23	–	7	–	0	.767	58	–	12	–	0	.829
No. 18 Georgia ‍‍‍^{y}	21	–	9	–	0	.700	46	–	17	–	0	.730
Tennessee ‍‍‍^{y}	14	–	16	–	0	.467	40	–	21	–	0	.656
Missouri ‍‍‍	13	–	16	–	1	.450	34	–	22	–	1	.605
Florida ‍‍‍^{y}	13	–	17	–	0	.433	34	–	26	–	0	.567
South Carolina ‍‍‍	8	–	22	–	0	.267	28	–	28	–	0	.500
Kentucky ‍‍‍	7	–	23	–	0	.233	26	–	29	–	0	.473
Western
No. 5 Mississippi State ^{x}‍‍‍^{y}	20	–	10	–	0	.667	52	–	15	–	0	.776
No. 6 Arkansas ^{x}‍‍‍^{y}	20	–	10	–	0	.667	46	–	20	–	0	.697
No. 14 LSU ‍‍‍^{y}	17	–	13	–	0	.567	40	–	26	–	0	.606
No. 20 Texas A&M ‍‍‍^{y}	16	–	13	–	1	.550	39	–	23	–	1	.627
No. 12 Ole Miss ‍‍‍^{y}	16	–	14	–	0	.533	41	–	27	–	0	.603
No. 9 Auburn ‍‍‍^{y}	14	–	16	–	0	.467	38	–	28	–	0	.576
Alabama ‍‍‍	7	–	23	–	0	.233	30	–	26	–	0	.536
x – Division champion † – Conference champion ‡ – Tournament champion y – Invited to the NCAA tournament As of June 25, 2019; Rankings from D1Baseball

The 2019 Kentucky Wildcats baseball team represented the University of Kentucky in the 2019 NCAA Division I baseball season. For the first season, the Wildcats played their home games at their new stadium, Kentucky Proud Park.

== Preseason ==
=== Preseason All-American teams ===
1st Team

- Zack Thompson – Starting Pitcher (Baseball America)

=== SEC media poll ===
The SEC media poll was released on February 7, 2019, with the Wildcats predicted to finish in sixth place in the Eastern Division.

Media poll (East)
Predicted finish	Team	Votes (1st place)
1	Vanderbilt	87 (9)
2	Florida	81 (4)
3	Georgia	68 (1)
4	South Carolina	53
5	Tennessee	40
6	Kentucky	30
7	Missouri	26

=== Preseason All-SEC teams ===
1st Team

- T.J. Collett – Designated Hitter/Utility
- Zack Thompson – Starting Pitcher

== Roster ==
2019 Kentucky Wildcats roster
Pitchers: 3 Ben Jordan – (redshirt) Freshman; 13 Cole Ayers – Freshman; 14 Zack Thompson – Junior; 15 Trip Lockhart – Sophomore; 16 Will Gambino – Freshman; 20 Braxton Cottongame – Freshman; 22 Dillon Marsh – Freshman; 24 Brett Marshall – (redshirt) Sophomore; 31 Alex Degen – Freshman; 34 Carson Coleman – (redshirt) Sophomore; 35 Cole Daniels – Freshman; 36 Brad Dobzanski – (redshirt) Freshman; 38 Jimmy Ramsey – Sophomore; 39 Hunter Rigsby – Freshman; 40 Brandon Sulzer – Freshman; 41 Grant Macciocchi – (redshirt) Junior; 45 Aaron McGeorge – Senior; 47 Kyle Music – Freshman; 50 Mason Hazelwood – Sophomore; 54 Daniel Harper – Sophomore; 55 Tyler Burchett – Freshman	Catchers: 8 Marshall Gei – Graduate; 21 Orlando Adams Jr. – Freshman; 25 Coltyn Kessler – Sophomore; 44 Brendan Hord – Freshman; 52 Tanner Holen – Junior; Infielders: 1 Jake Thompson – Junior; 2 Austin Schultz – Freshman; 4 Zeke Lewis – (redshirt) Junior; 5 T.J. Collett – Junior; 10 Dalton Reed – Junior; 19 Alex Rodriguez – Senior; 26 Justin Olson – Freshman; 33 Trae Harmon – Freshman; 42 Elliott Curtis – Junior; 43 Breydon Daniel – Junior	Outfielders: 7 Rook Ellington – Freshman; 12 Ryan Shinn – Senior; 28 Ryan Johnson – Senior; 30 Jaren Shelby – Junior; 37 Cam Hill – Sophomore

== Personnel ==
=== Coaching staff ===
2019 Kentucky Wildcats coaching staff
- Nick Mingione – Head coach – 3rd year
- Jim Belanger – Assistant coach – 3rd year
- Roland Fanning – Assistant coach – 3rd year
- Todd Guilliams – Volunteer assistant coach – 3rd year
- Cameron Langfels – Director of operations – 1st year

== Schedule and results ==
Legend
	Kentucky win
	Kentucky loss
	Postponement
**Bold**	Kentucky team member

2019 Kentucky Wildcats baseball game log
Regular season (26–29)

February (5–3)
Date	Opponent	Rank	Site/stadium	Score	Win	Loss	Save	TV	Attendance	Overall record	SEC record
Feb. 15	at Austin Peay		Raymond C. Hand Park; Clarksville, Tennessee	8–4	**Coleman** (1–0)	Gollert (0–1)	None		310	1–0	–
Feb. 16	at Austin Peay		Raymond C. Hand Park	12–5	**Ramsey** (1–0)	Newberg (0–1)	None		414	2–0	–
Feb. 17	at Austin Peay		Raymond C. Hand Park	11–1	**Coleman** (2–0)	Rye (0–1)	None		279	3–0	–
Feb. 22	at No. 3 Texas Tech		Dan Law Field at Rip Griffin Park; Lubbock, Texas	4–7	Queen (2–0)	**Coleman (2–1)**	None		3,504	3–1	–
Feb. 23	at No. 3 Texas Tech		Dan Law Field at Rip Griffin Park	7–10	Dobbins (1–0)	**Hazelwood** (0–1)	Beeter (2)		3,629	3–2	–
Feb. 24	at No. 3 Texas Tech		Dan Law Field at Rip Griffin Park	4–19	Montgomery (1–0)	**Marsh** (0–1)	None		3,686	3–3	–
Feb. 26	Eastern Kentucky		Kentucky Proud Park; Lexington, Kentucky	7–3	**Macciocchi** (1–0)	Ferris (1–1)	None	SECN+	4,074	4–3	–
Feb. 27	Northern Kentucky		Kentucky Proud Park	5–4	**Degen** (1–0)	Ross (0–2)	None	SECN+	3,096	5–3	–

March (11–9)
Date	Opponent	Rank	Site/stadium	Score	Win	Loss	Save	TV	Attendance	Overall record	SEC record
Mar. 1	Canisius		Kentucky Proud Park	10–2	**Harper** (1–0)	Warner (0–1)	None	SECN+	2,642	6–3	–
Mar. 2	Canisius		Kentucky Proud Park	12–3	**Marsh** (1–1)	Kneussle (1–1)	None	SECN+		7–3	–
Mar. 2	Canisius		Kentucky Proud Park	4–3	**Daniels** (1–0)	Burmaster (0–2)	**Coleman** (1)	SECN+	2,861	8–3	–
Mar. 6	Boston College		Kentucky Proud Park	3–12	Witkowski (1–0)	**Coleman** (2–2)	None	SECN+	2,643	8–4	–
Mar. 8	Middle Tennessee		Kentucky Proud Park	4–1	**Thompson** (1–0)	Keenan (1–2)	**Ramsey** (1)	SECN+	2,751	9–4	–
Mar. 10	Middle Tennessee		Kentucky Proud Park	7–0	**Daniels** (2–0)	Lester (0–1)	None	SECN+	3,680	10–4	–
Mar. 10	Middle Tennessee		Kentucky Proud Park	5–4	**Ramsey** (2–0)	Holcombe (1–4)	None	SECN+	3,680	11–4	–
Mar. 12	SIU Edwardsville		Kentucky Proud Park	6–4	**Harper** (2–0)	Drewry (1–1)	None	SECN+	2,788	12–4	–
Mar. 13	Western Kentucky		Kentucky Proud Park	15–0	**Marsh** (2–1)	Newell (1–2)	None	SECN+	2,948	13–4	–
Mar. 16	at No. 13 LSU		Alex Box Stadium; Baton Rouge, Louisiana	1–2^{12}	Fontenot (3–0)	**Lockhart** (0–1)	None	SECN+	10,509	13–5	0–1
Mar. 16	at No. 13 LSU		Alex Box Stadium	4–16	Henry (1–0)	**Macciocchi** (1–1)	Vietmeier (1)	SECN+	10,622	13–6	0–2
Mar. 17	at No. 13 LSU		Alex Box Stadium	2–7	Beck (2–0)	**Rigsby** (0–1)	None	SECN+	10,323	13–7	0–3
Mar. 19	Xavier		Kentucky Proud Park	16–3	**Lockhart** (1–1)	Kent (0–2)	None	SECN+	3,009	14–7	–
Mar. 22	No. 13 Texas A&M		Kentucky Proud Park	3–5	Miller (3–0)	**Coleman** (2–3)	Kalich (6)	SECN+	3,270	14–8	0–4
Mar. 23	No. 13 Texas A&M		Kentucky Proud Park	3–9	Lacy (5–0)	**Macciocchi** (1–2)	Jozwiak (1)	SECN+	3,264	14–9	0–5
Mar. 24	No. 13 Texas A&M		Kentucky Proud Park	5–17	Menefee (2–0)	**Ramsey** (2–1)	Miller (1)	SECN+	3,368	14–10	0–6
Mar. 26	Morehead State		Kentucky Proud Park	7–0	**Hazelwood** (1–1)	Rogers (2–2)	None	SECN+	2,930	15–10	–
Mar. 28	No. 4 Georgia		Kentucky Proud Park	3–7	Hancock (6–1)	**Ramsey** (2–2)	None	SECN	3,292	15–11	0–7
Mar. 29	No. 4 Georgia		Kentucky Proud Park	5–0	**Thompson** (2–0)	Smith (2–1)	None	SECN+	3,124	16–11	1–7
Mar. 30	No. 4 Georgia		Kentucky Proud Park	8–10^{10}	Schunk (1–0)	**Harper** (2–1)	None	SECN+	3,134	16–12	1–8

April (6–10)
Date	Opponent	Rank	Site/stadium	Score	Win	Loss	Save	TV	Attendance	Overall record	SEC record
April 2	at Louisville		Jim Patterson Stadium; Louisville, Kentucky	3–8	Elliott (2–1)	**Hazelwood** (1–2)	None	ACCN Extra	4,278	16–13	–
April 5	at Missouri		Taylor Stadium; Columbia, Missouri	4–2	**Daniels** (3–0)	Cantleberry (3–2)	**Coleman** (2)	SECN+	905	17–13	2–8
April 6	at Missouri		Taylor Stadium	4–5	Dulle (3–3)	**Ayers** (0–1)	None	SECN+	1,627	17–14	2–9
April 7	at Missouri		Taylor Stadium	2–9	Sikkema (3–2)	**Cottongame** (0–1)	None	SECN+	1,020	17–15	2–10
April 10	at Lipscomb		Dugan Field; Nashville, Tennessee	6–2	**Harper** (3–1)	Habegger (2–2)	None		457	18–15	–
April 12	at No. 11 Ole Miss		Swayze Field; Oxford, Mississippi	2–8	Ethridge (5–2)	**Ramsey** (2–3)	None	SECN+	9,491	18–16	2–11
April 14	at No. 11 Ole Miss		Swayze Field	4–1	**Hazelwood** (2–2)	Nikhazy (3–2)	**Coleman** (3)	SECN	7,978	19–16	3–11
April 14	at No. 11 Ole Miss		Swayze Field	4–2	**Thompson** (3–0)	Hoglund (1–1)	**Harper** (1)	SECN+	7,978	20–16	4–11
April 16	Louisville		Kentucky Proud Park	6–18	Perkins (2–0)	**Macciocchi** (1–3)	None	SECN+	4,919	20–17	–
April 18	Tennessee		Kentucky Proud Park	2–4	Schultz (2–0)	**Harper** (3–2)	Walsh (7)	SECN+	3,463	20–18	4–12
April 19	Tennessee		Kentucky Proud Park	1–16	Stallings (7–2)	**Hazelwood** (2–3)	None	SECN+	3,717	20–19	4–13
April 20	Tennessee		Kentucky Proud Park	2–8	Linginfelter (6–4)	**Thompson** (3–1)	None	SECN+	3,257	20–20	4–14
April 23	at Western Kentucky		Bowling Green Ballpark; Bowling Green, Kentucky	15–4	**Marsh** (3–1)	Ciocco (0–1)	None		2,836	21–20	–
April 26	at Florida		Alfred A. McKethan Stadium; Gainesville, Florida	8–10	Scott (4–3)	**Ramsey** (2–4)	None	SECN+	3,664	21–21	4–15
April 27	at Florida		Alfred A. McKethan Stadium	5–1	**Thompson** (4–1)	Leftwich (4–4)	None	SECN	4,068	22–21	5–15
April 28	at Florida		Alfred A. McKethan Stadium	8–12	Scott (5–3)	**Coleman** (2–4)	None	ESPN2	3,401	22–22	5–22

May (4–7)
Date	Opponent	Rank	Site/stadium	Score	Win	Loss	Save	TV	Attendance	Overall record	SEC record
May 3	Arkansas		Kentucky Proud Park	2–5	Campbell (8–1)	**Ramsey** (2–5)	Cronin (10)	SECN+	4,225	22–23	5–17
May 5	Arkansas		Kentucky Proud Park	1–9	Wicklander (5–1)	**Marsh** (3–2)	None	SECN+	3,749	22–24	5–18
May 5	Arkansas		Kentucky Proud Park	5–4	**Thompson** (5–1)	Noland (2–3)	**Coleman** (4)	SECN+	3,749	23–24	6–18
May 7	Indiana		Kentucky Proud Park	5–2	**Ramsey** (3–5)	Sommer (4–3)	**Lockhart** (1)	SECN	3,162	24–24	–
May 10	at South Carolina		Founders Park; Columbia, South Carolina	4–5	Harley (3–4)	**Ayers** (0–2)	Kerry (6)	SECN	5,983	24–25	6–19
May 11	at South Carolina		Founders Park	3–11	Morgan (4–5)	**Ramsey** (3–6)	Kerry (7)	SECN	6,451	24–26	6–20
May 12	at South Carolina		Founders Park	6–2	**Thompson** (6–1)	Lloyd (3–4)	None	SECN	6,008	25–26	7–20
May 14	Michigan		Kentucky Proud Park	7–4	**Ramsey** (4–6)	Cleveland (4–2)	**Coleman** (5)	SECN	3,224	26–26	–
May 16	Vanderbilt		Kentucky Proud Park	10–16	Fisher (2–0)	**Harper** (3–3)	King (3)	SECN+	3,649	26–27	7–21
May 17	Vanderbilt		Kentucky Proud Park	4–12	Rocker (7–5)	**Marsh** (3–3)	None	SECN+	4,491	26–28	7–22
May 18	Vanderbilt		Kentucky Proud Park	4–7	Brown (2–1)	**Coleman** (2–5)	None	SECN+	4,249	26–29	7–23

† Indicates the game does not count toward the 2019 Southeastern Conference standings.
*Rankings are based on the team's current ranking in the D1Baseball poll.

== Record vs. conference opponents ==
Last two do not qualify for conf. tourn. Blank are not scheduled. Blue are home games, otherwise away.

2019 SEC baseball records Source: 2019 SEC baseball game results
Team	W–L	ALA	ARK	AUB	FLA	UGA	KEN	LSU	MSU	MIZZ	MISS	SCAR	TENN	TAMU	VAN	Team	Div	SR	SW
ALA	7–23		1–2	1–2	0–3	0–3	.	1–2	0–3	.	1–2	2–1	.	1–2	0–3	ALA	W7	1–9	0–4
ARK	20–10	2–1		2–1	.	.	2–1	3–0	2–1	3–0	1–2	.	3–0	1–2	1–2	ARK	W1	7–3	3–0
AUB	14–16	2–1	1–2		.	1–2	.	1–2	1–2	.	2–1	2–1	3–0	1–2	0–3	AUB	W6	4–6	1–1
FLA	13–17	3–0	.	.		0–3	2–1	1–2	1–2	3–0	0–3	2–1	1–2	.	0–3	FLA	E5	4–6	2–3
UGA	21–9	3–0	.	2–1	3–0		2–1	2–1	0–3	3–0	.	3–0	1–2	.	2–1	UGA	E2	8–2	4–1
KEN	7–23	.	1–2	.	1–2	1–2		0–3	.	1–2	2–1	1–2	0–3	0–3	0–3	KEN	E7	1–9	0–4
LSU	17–13	2–1	0–3	2–1	2–1	1–2	3–0		3–0	1–2	1–2	.	.	2–1	.	LSU	W3	6–4	2–1
MSU	20–10	3–0	1–2	2–1	2–1	3–0	.	0–3		.	3–0	2–1	2–1	2–1	.	MSU	W2	8–2	3–1
MIZZ	13–16	.	0–3	.	0–3	0–3	2–1	2–1	.		2–1	3–0	2–1	1–1	1–2	MIZZ	E4	5–4	1–3
MISS	16–14	2–1	2–1	1–2	3–0	.	1–2	2–1	0–3	1–2		.	1–2	3–0	.	MISS	W5	5–5	2–1
SCAR	8–22	1–2	.	1–2	1–2	0–3	2–1	.	1–2	0–3	.		1–2	1–2	0–3	SCAR	E6	1–9	0–3
TENN	14–16	.	0–3	0–3	2–1	2–1	3–0	.	1–2	1–2	2–1	2–1		.	1–2	TENN	E3	5–5	1–2
TAMU	16–13	2–1	2–1	2–1	.	.	3–0	1–2	1–2	1–1	0–3	2–1	.		2–1	TAMU	W4	6–3	1–1
VAN	23–7	3–0	2–1	3–0	3–0	1–2	3–0	.	.	2–1	.	3–0	2–1	1–2		VAN	E1	8–2	5–0
Team	W–L	ALA	ARK	AUB	FLA	UGA	KEN	LSU	MSU	MIZZ	MISS	SCAR	TENN	TAMU	VAN	Team	Div	SR	SW

Updated for entire regular season. Missouri at Texas A&M series had one tie game.

== Rankings ==
Ranking movements
	Week																			
Poll	Pre	1	2	3	4	5	6	7	8	9	10	11	12	13	14	15	16	17	18	Final
Coaches'		*																		
Baseball America																				
NCBWA†																				

† NCBWA ranks 30 teams in their preseason poll, but only ranks 25 teams weekly during the season.
* A new poll was not released for this week, so for comparison purposes, the previous week's ranking is inserted in this week's slot.
