= 2019 Southeastern Conference baseball tournament =

- Teams: 12
- Format: See below
- Finals site: Hoover Metropolitan Stadium; Hoover, AL
- Champions: Vanderbilt (3rd title)
- Winning coach: Tim Corbin (2nd title)
- MVP: J.J. Bleday (Vanderbilt)
- Television: SEC Network, ESPN2 (Championship game)

2019 Southeastern Conference baseball standings
	Conf.						Overall
Team	W		L		T	PCT	W		L		T	PCT
Eastern
No. 1 Vanderbilt ^{x}‍†‍‡‍^{y}	23	–	7	–	0	.767	58	–	12	–	0	.829
No. 18 Georgia ‍‍‍^{y}	21	–	9	–	0	.700	46	–	17	–	0	.730
Tennessee ‍‍‍^{y}	14	–	16	–	0	.467	40	–	21	–	0	.656
Missouri ‍‍‍	13	–	16	–	1	.450	34	–	22	–	1	.605
Florida ‍‍‍^{y}	13	–	17	–	0	.433	34	–	26	–	0	.567
South Carolina ‍‍‍	8	–	22	–	0	.267	28	–	28	–	0	.500
Kentucky ‍‍‍	7	–	23	–	0	.233	26	–	29	–	0	.473
Western
No. 5 Mississippi State ^{x}‍‍‍^{y}	20	–	10	–	0	.667	52	–	15	–	0	.776
No. 6 Arkansas ^{x}‍‍‍^{y}	20	–	10	–	0	.667	46	–	20	–	0	.697
No. 14 LSU ‍‍‍^{y}	17	–	13	–	0	.567	40	–	26	–	0	.606
No. 20 Texas A&M ‍‍‍^{y}	16	–	13	–	1	.550	39	–	23	–	1	.627
No. 12 Ole Miss ‍‍‍^{y}	16	–	14	–	0	.533	41	–	27	–	0	.603
No. 9 Auburn ‍‍‍^{y}	14	–	16	–	0	.467	38	–	28	–	0	.576
Alabama ‍‍‍	7	–	23	–	0	.233	30	–	26	–	0	.536
x – Division champion † – Conference champion ‡ – Tournament champion y – Invited to the NCAA tournament As of June 25, 2019; Rankings from D1Baseball

The 2019 Southeastern Conference baseball tournament was held from May 21 through 26 at Hoover Metropolitan Stadium in Hoover, Alabama. The annual tournament determined the tournament champion of the Division I Southeastern Conference in college baseball. The tournament champion earned the conference's automatic bid to the 2019 NCAA Division I baseball tournament

The tournament has been held every year since 1977, with LSU claiming twelve championships, the most of any school. Original members Georgia and Kentucky along with 1993 addition Arkansas have never won the tournament. This is the twentieth consecutive year and twenty-second overall that the event has been held at Hoover Metropolitan Stadium, known from 2007 through 2012 as Regions Park. Texas A&M joined in 2013, and won its first title in 2016. Missouri, which also joined in 2013, has yet to win the event.

== Format and seeding ==
The regular season division winners claimed the top two seeds and the next ten teams by conference winning percentage, regardless of division, claimed the remaining berths in the tournament. The bottom eight teams played a single-elimination opening round, followed by a double-elimination format until the semifinals, when the format reverted to single elimination through the championship game. This was the sixth year of this format.

Team	W–L	Pct	GB #1	Seed
Eastern Division
Vanderbilt	23–7	.767	–	1
Georgia	21–9	.700	2	3
Tennessee	14–16	.467	9	9
Missouri	13–16–1	.450	9.5	10
Florida	13–17	.433	10	11
South Carolina	8–22	.267	15	12
Kentucky	7–23	.233	16	–

Team	W–L	Pct	GB #1	Seed
Western Division
Arkansas	20–10	.667	3	2
Mississippi State	20–10	.667	3	4
LSU	17–13	.567	6	5
Texas A&M	16–13–1	.550	6.5	6
Ole Miss	16–14	.533	7	7
Auburn	14–16	.467	9	8
Alabama	7–23	.233	16	–

== Bracket ==
First round Tuesday, May 21
6	Texas A&M	8
11	Florida	7^{10}
7	Ole Miss	2
10	Missouri	1
8	Auburn	5
9	Tennessee	3
5	LSU	8
12	South Carolina	6

Second round Wednesday, May 22
3	Georgia	2
6	Texas A&M	0
2	Arkansas	5
7	Ole Miss	3
7	Ole Miss	1
6	Texas A&M	0
1	Vanderbilt	11
8	Auburn	1^{8}
4	Mississippi State	6
5	LSU	5^{17}
8	Auburn	3
5	LSU	4

Third round Thursday, May 23; Friday, May 24
3	Georgia	3
2	Arkansas	1
7	Ole Miss	3
2	Arkansas	2
1	Vanderbilt	1
4	Mississippi State	0
5	LSU	12
4	Mississippi State	2^{7}

Semifinals; Saturday, May 25
3	Georgia	3
7	Ole Miss	5
1	Vanderbilt	13
5	LSU	4

Final; Sunday, May 26
7	Ole Miss	10
1	Vanderbilt	11

== Schedule ==
Game	Time*	Matchup^{#}	Television	Attendance
Tuesday, May 21
1	9:30 a.m.	No. 6 Texas A&M vs. No. 11 Florida	SEC Network	4,135
2	1:00 p.m.	No. 7 Ole Miss vs. No. 10 Missouri	SEC Network	4,135
3	4:30 p.m.	No. 8 Auburn vs. No. 9 Tennessee	SEC Network	10,128
4	8:00 p.m.	No. 5 LSU vs. No. 12 South Carolina	SEC Network	10,128
Wednesday, May 22
5	9:30 a.m.	No. 3 Georgia vs. No. 6 Texas A&M	SEC Network	5,264
6	1:00 p.m.	No. 2 Arkansas vs. No. 7 Ole Miss	SEC Network	5,264
7	4:30 p.m.	No. 1 Vanderbilt vs. No. 8 Auburn	SEC Network	13,902
8	8:00 p.m.	No. 4 Mississippi State vs. No. 5 LSU	SEC Network	13,902
Thursday, May 23
9	9:30 a.m.	No. 6 Texas A&M vs. No. 7 Ole Miss	SEC Network	6,891
10	1:00 p.m.	No. 8 Auburn vs. No. 5 LSU	SEC Network	6,891
11	4:30 p.m.	No. 2 Arkansas vs. No. 3 Georgia	SEC Network	8,620
12	8:00 p.m.	No. 1 Vanderbilt vs. No. 4 Mississippi State	SEC Network	8,620
Friday, May 24
13	3:00 p.m.	No. 7 Ole Miss vs. No. 2 Arkansas	SEC Network	14,294
14	6:30 p.m.	No. 5 LSU vs. No. 4 Mississippi State	SEC Network	14,294
Semifinals – Saturday, May 25
15	Noon	No. 3 Georgia vs. No. 7 Ole Miss	SEC Network	12,872
16	3:30 p.m.	No. 1 Vanderbilt vs. No. 5 LSU	SEC Network	12,872
Championship – Sunday, May 26
17	2:00 p.m.	No. 7 Ole Miss vs. No. 1 Vanderbilt	ESPN2	10,487
*Game times in CDT. # – Rankings denote tournament seed.

== Conference championship ==
SEC Championship
(7) Ole Miss Rebels	vs.	(1) Vanderbilt Commodores

May 26, 2019, 2:00 p.m. (CDT) at Hoover Metropolitan Stadium in Hoover, Alabama
Team	1	2	3	4	5	6	7	8	9	R	H	E
(7) Ole Miss	6	1	2	0	1	0	0	0	0	10	9	1
(1) Vanderbilt	0	1	2	5	1	1	0	0	1	11	17	2
WP: Tyler Brown (3–1) LP: Austin Miller (5–3); Home runs: MISS: None; VAN: Pat DeMarco
