= 2019 Alabama Crimson Tide baseball team =

American college baseball season

2019 Alabama Crimson Tide baseball
- Conference: Southeastern Conference
- Western Division
- Record: 30–26 (7–23 SEC)
- Head coach: Brad Bohannon (2nd season)
- Hitting coach: Jerry Zulli
- Pitching coach: Jason Jackson
- Home stadium: Sewell–Thomas Stadium

2019 Southeastern Conference baseball standings
	Conf.						Overall
Team	W		L		T	PCT	W		L		T	PCT
Eastern
No. 1 Vanderbilt ^{x}‍†‍‡‍^{y}	23	–	7	–	0	.767	58	–	12	–	0	.829
No. 18 Georgia ‍‍‍^{y}	21	–	9	–	0	.700	46	–	17	–	0	.730
Tennessee ‍‍‍^{y}	14	–	16	–	0	.467	40	–	21	–	0	.656
Missouri ‍‍‍	13	–	16	–	1	.450	34	–	22	–	1	.605
Florida ‍‍‍^{y}	13	–	17	–	0	.433	34	–	26	–	0	.567
South Carolina ‍‍‍	8	–	22	–	0	.267	28	–	28	–	0	.500
Kentucky ‍‍‍	7	–	23	–	0	.233	26	–	29	–	0	.473
Western
No. 5 Mississippi State ^{x}‍‍‍^{y}	20	–	10	–	0	.667	52	–	15	–	0	.776
No. 6 Arkansas ^{x}‍‍‍^{y}	20	–	10	–	0	.667	46	–	20	–	0	.697
No. 14 LSU ‍‍‍^{y}	17	–	13	–	0	.567	40	–	26	–	0	.606
No. 20 Texas A&M ‍‍‍^{y}	16	–	13	–	1	.550	39	–	23	–	1	.627
No. 12 Ole Miss ‍‍‍^{y}	16	–	14	–	0	.533	41	–	27	–	0	.603
No. 9 Auburn ‍‍‍^{y}	14	–	16	–	0	.467	38	–	28	–	0	.576
Alabama ‍‍‍	7	–	23	–	0	.233	30	–	26	–	0	.536
x – Division champion † – Conference champion ‡ – Tournament champion y – Invited to the NCAA tournament As of June 25, 2019; Rankings from D1Baseball

The 2019 Alabama Crimson Tide baseball team represented the University of Alabama in the 2019 NCAA Division I baseball season. The Crimson Tide played their home games at Sewell–Thomas Stadium. This season is the second under head coach Brad Bohannon.

== Preseason ==
=== SEC media poll ===
The SEC media poll was released on February 7, 2019 with the Crimson Tide predicted to finish in last place in the Western Division.

Media poll (West)
Predicted finish	Team	Votes (1st place)
1	LSU	88 (10)
2	Ole Miss	65 (1)
3	Arkansas	59 (1)
4	Auburn	57 (1)
5	Texas A&M	48 (1)
6	Mississippi State	47
7	Alabama	21

== Personnel ==
=== Returning starters ===
Player	Class	Position
Joe Breaux	Senior	OF
Keith Holcombe	Senior	OF
Sam Praytor	Sophomore	C
Sam Finnerty	Senior	SP
Garret Rukes	Junior	SP

=== Roster ===
2019 Alabama Crimson Tide roster
Pitchers: 5 Tyler Ras - Freshman; 9 Casey Cobb - Junior; 10 Sam Finnerty - Senior; 11 Wil Freeman - Junior; 20 Brock Love - (redshirt) Junior; 21 Garret Rukes - (redshirt) Sophomore; 23 Jeremy Randolph - Senior; 25 Dylan Smith - Freshman; 26 Dylan Oliver - Junior; 27 Chase Lee - (redshirt) Freshman; 29 Connor Shamblin - Freshman; 32 Deacon Medders - Junior; 33 Kyle Cameron - (redshirt) Junior; 34 Jacob McNairy - Freshman; 40 Brock Guffey - Sophomore; 44 Davis Vainer - (redshirt) Junior; 48 Landon Green - Freshman	Catchers: 7 Brett Auerbach - Junior; 19 Sam Praytor - Sophomore; 42 Johnny Hawk - Junior; Infielders: 1 Daniel Carinci - Freshman; 2 John Trousdale - Junior; 8 Morgan McCullough - Junior; 16 Isaiah Byars - Freshman; 24 Kolby Robinson - Junior; 50 Kobe Morris - Junior; 55 Drew Williamson - Freshman	Outfielders: 4 Joe Breaux - Senior; 12 Tyrell Shavers - Sophomore; 13 Walker McCleney - Junior; 14 Gene Wood - (redshirt) Junior; 18 Keith Holcombe - Senior; 22 T.J. Reeves - Freshman; 28 Tyler Gentry - Sophomore; 36 Justin King - Junior

=== Coaching staff ===
2019 Alabama Crimson Tide baseball coaching staff
- Brad Bohannon – Head Coach (2nd year)
- Josh Jackson – Assistant coach (2nd year)
- Jerry Zulli – Assistant coach (2nd year)
- Matthew Reida – Volunteer assistant coach (1st year)
- Jack Hoehl – Director of Operations (2nd year)

== Schedule ==
Legend
	Alabama win
	Alabama loss
	Postponement
**Bold**	Alabama team member

2019 Alabama Crimson Tide baseball game log
Regular season
February (7–2)

Date	Opponent	Rank	Stadium Site	Score	Win	Loss	Save	Attendance	Overall Record	SEC Record
February 15	Presbyterian		Sewell–Thomas Stadium; Tuscaloosa, AL	7–2	**S. Finnerty (1–0)**	A. Durden (0–1)	None	3,366	1–0	–
February 16	Presbyterian		Sewell–Thomas Stadium	1–4	J. Rice (1–0)	**D. Medders (0–1)**	C. Springs (1)	–	1–1	–
February 16	Presbyterian		Sewell–Thomas Stadium	9–4	**C. Shamblin (1–0)**	R. Fowler (0–1)	**J. Randolph (1)**	4,455	2–1	–
February 18	Jacksonville State		Sewell–Thomas Stadium	13–2	**K. Cameron (1–0)**	A. London (0–1)	None	2,631	3–1	–
February 20	Alabama St.		Sewell–Thomas Stadium	Postponed (inclement weather)						
February 22	Ball St.		Sewell–Thomas Stadium	7–1	**S. Finnerty (1–0)**	D. Jameson (0–1)	None	2,523	4–1	–
February 23	Ball St.		Sewell–Thomas Stadium	5–8	M. Pachmayer (1–0)	**T. Ras (0–1)**	K. Nicolas (1)	2,672	4–2	–
February 24	Ball St.		Sewell–Thomas Stadium	6–0	**C. Shamblin (2–0)**	B. Burns (0–2)	None	2,648	5–2	–
February 26	North Alabama		Sewell–Thomas Stadium	8–0	**W. Freeman (1–0)**	A. Mancour (0–1)	None	2,957	6–2	–
February 27	North Alabama		Sewell–Thomas Stadium	4–1	**C. Lee (1–0)**	G. Gillum (0–1)	**J. McNairy (1)**	2,849	7–2	–

March (13–7)

Date	Opponent	Rank	Stadium Site	Score	Win	Loss	Save	Attendance	Overall Record	SEC Record
March 1	at South Alabama		Stanky Field; Mobile, AL	7–3	**S. Finnerty (3–0)**	N. DeSantis (0–1)	**C. Cobb (1)**	3,013	8–2	–
March 2	at South Alabama		Stanky Field	10–5	**D. Medders (1–1)**	J. Booker (0–2)	None	–	9–2	–
March 2	at South Alabama		Stanky Field	6–1	**B. Love (1–0)**	C. Yarborough (1–1)	None	2,538	10–2	–
March 5	UAB		Sewell–Thomas Stadium	4–3	**G. Rukes (1–0)**	G. Ashcraft (1–1)	**J. Randolph (2)**	2,424	11–2	–
March 6	South Dakota St.		Sewell–Thomas Stadium	5–4^{(14)}	**K. Cameron (2–0)**	R. McSherry (0–1)	None	2,377	12–2	–
March 8	Northern Kentucky		Sewell–Thomas Stadium	15–1	**S. Finnerty (4–0)**	S. Williams (0–4)	None	2,416	13–2	–
March 9	Northern Kentucky		Sewell–Thomas Stadium	9–4	**B. Love (2–0)**	K. Service (0–2)	None	2,471	14–2	–
March 10	Northern Kentucky		Sewell–Thomas Stadium	10–1	**W. Freeman (1–0)**	K. Arganbright (0–1)	None	2,569	15–2	–
March 12	Middle Tennessee	#26	Sewell–Thomas Stadium	2–0	**D. Vainer (1–0)**	J. Young (1–4)	**J. Randolph (3)**	2,713	16–2	–
March 15	at #19 Ole Miss	#26	Swayze Field; Oxford, MS	0–1	W. Ethridge (4–0)	**S. Finnerty (4–1)**	P. Caracci (3)	8,507	16–3	0–1
March 16	at #19 Ole Miss	#26	Swayze Field	8–6	**D. Medders (2–1)**	D. Nikhazy (1–2)	**J. Randolph (4)**	9,016	17–3	1–1
March 17	at #19 Ole Miss	#26	Swayze Field	2–12	G. Hoglund (1–0)	**W. Freeman (2–1)**	None	8,667	17–4	1–2
March 19	Maine		Sewell–Thomas Stadium	16–0	**T. Ras (1–1)**	J. Courtney (0–1)	None	2,889	18–4	–
March 22	#10 Arkansas		Sewell–Thomas Stadium	3–12	I. Campbell (5–0)	**S. Finnerty (4–2)**	None	4,060	18–5	1–3
March 23	#10 Arkansas		Sewell–Thomas Stadium	10–0	**B. Love (3–0)**	C. Noland (0–1)	None	4,317	19–5	2–3
March 24	#10 Arkansas		Sewell–Thomas Stadium	2–10	C. Scroggins (2–0)	**W. Freeman (2–2)**	None	3,687	19–6	2–4
March 26 †	vs. #13 Auburn		Riverwalk Stadium; Montgomery, AL	6–3	**J. Randolph (1–0)**	K. Gray (1–2)	None	7,896	20–6	–
March 29	at #19 Florida		McKethan Stadium; Gainesville, FL	1–3	T. Mace (5–2)	**S. Finnerty (4–3)**	None	4,521	20–7	2–5
March 30	at #19 Florida		McKethan Stadium	3–12	C. Scott (3–1)	**B. Love (3–1)**	None	5,156	20–8	2–6
March 31	at #19 Florida		McKethan Stadium	3–6	H. Ruth (1–0)	**T. Ras (1–2)**	None	3,785	20–9	2–7

April (6–10)

Date	Opponent	Rank	Stadium Site	Score	Win	Loss	Save	Attendance	Overall Record	SEC Record
April 2	Troy		Sewell–Thomas Stadium	4–8	S. Goodwin (2–3)	**C. Shamblin (2–1)**	None	3,137	20–10	–
April 5	South Carolina		Sewell–Thomas Stadium	9–0	**S. Finnerty (5–3)**	D. Lloyd (2–3)	None	–	21–10	3–7
April 5	South Carolina		Sewell–Thomas Stadium	4–1	**B. Love (4–1)**	R. Morgan (3–1)	**J. Randolph (5)**	3,171	22–10	4–7
April 6	South Carolina		Sewell–Thomas Stadium	4–5^{(12)}	B. Kerry (3–1)	**D. Medders (2–2)**	None	3,146	22–11	4–8
April 9	at Samford		Griffin Stadium; Birmingham, AL	21–2	**G. Rukes (2–0)**	H. Skinner (0–1)	None	1,221	23–11	–
April 12	at #10 Mississippi St.		Dudy Noble Field; Starkville, MS	0–6	E. Small (4–0)	**S. Finnerty (5–4)**	None	10,386	23–12	4–9
April 13	at #10 Mississippi St.		Dudy Noble Field	1–9	P. Plumlee (2–2)	**B. Love (4–2)**	None	11,112	23–13	4–10
April 14	at #10 Mississippi St.		Dudy Noble Field	3–13	C. Gordon (4–0)	**C. Cobb (0–1)**	None	8,593	23–14	4–11
April 16	at UAB		Regions Field; Birmingham, AL	3–2	**G. Rukes (3–0)**	A. Pondick (1–1)	**J. Randolph (6)**	1,518	24–14	–
April 19	#6 Vanderbilt		Sewell–Thomas Stadium	4–7	D. Fellows (8–0)	**S. Finnerty (5–5)**	T. Brown (8)	2,862	24–15	4–12
April 20	#6 Vanderbilt		Sewell–Thomas Stadium	5–13	K. Rocker (4–4)	**B. Love (4–4)**	Z. King (2)	3,609	24–16	4–13
April 21	#6 Vanderbilt		Sewell–Thomas Stadium	5–13	P. Raby (6–1)	**J. Randolph (1–1)**	T. Brown (9)	3,006	24–17	4–14
April 24	at Jacksonville St.		Abbott Field; Jacksonville, AL	6–3	**K. Cameron (3–0)**	C. Edwards (4–4)	**J. Randolph (7)**	2,033	25–17	–
April 26	#15 LSU		Sewell–Thomas Stadium	6–1	**S. Finnerty (6–5)**	Z. Hess (2–3)	None	4,240	26–17	5–14
April 27	#15 LSU		Sewell–Thomas Stadium	2–5	E. Walker (4–3)	**B. Love (4–5)**	D. Fontenot (5)	4,452	26–18	5–15
April 28	#15 LSU		Sewell–Thomas Stadium	4–5	L. Marceaux (3–2)	**J. Randolph (1–2)**	D. Fontenot (6)	3,633	26–19	5–16

May (4–7)

Date	Opponent	Rank	Stadium Site	Score	Win	Loss	Save	Attendance	Overall Record	SEC Record
May 3	at Auburn		Plainsman Park; Auburn, AL	1–5	J. Owen (4–0)	**S. Finnerty (6–6)**	None	3,982	26–20	5–18
May 4	at Auburn		Plainsman Park	7–6	**J. Randolph (1–2)**	C. Greenhill (1–2)	**D. Medders (1)**	3,532	27–20	6–17
May 5	at Auburn		Plainsman Park	7–17	B. Horn (2–0)	**B. Guffey (0–1)**	None	3,665	27–21	6–18
May 8	at Troy		Riddle–Pace Field; Troy, AL	7–3	**C. Cobb (1–1)**	G. Stewart (2–2)	**J. Randolph (8)**	3,210	28–21	–
May 10	#21 Texas A&M		Sewell–Thomas Stadium	2–3	J. Doxakis (6–3)	**D. Vainer (1–1)**	K. Kalich (11)	2,671	28–22	6–19
May 11	#21 Texas A&M		Sewell–Thomas Stadium	2–1	**B. Love (5–4)**	A. Lacy (7–4)	**J. Randolph (9)**	3,317	29–22	7–19
May 12	#21 Texas A&M		Sewell–Thomas Stadium	5–6	C. Weber (4–0)	**S. Finnerty (6–7)**	K. Kalich (12)	2,466	29–23	7–20
May 14	Samford		Sewell–Thomas Stadium	4–2	**J. Randolph (3–2)**	C. Radcliff (2–2)	None	2,820	30–23	–
May 16	at #9 Georgia		Foley Field; Athens, GA	4–9	C. Wilcox (3–1)	**T. Ras (1–3)**	None	3,006	30–24	7–21
May 17	at #9 Georgia		Foley Field	2–12	T. Locey (10–1)	**B. Love (5–5)**	None	3,093	30–25	7–22
May 18	at #9 Georgia		Foley Field	1–9	E. Hancock (8–2)	**S. Finnerty (6–8)**	None	3,010	30–26	7–23

† Indicates the game does not count toward the 2019 Southeastern Conference standings.
Rankings are based on the team's current ranking in the Collegiate Baseball poll.

== Records vs. conference opponents ==
Last two do not qualify for conf. tourn. Blank are not scheduled. Blue are home games, otherwise away.

2019 SEC baseball records Source: 2019 SEC baseball game results
Team	W–L	ALA	ARK	AUB	FLA	UGA	KEN	LSU	MSU	MIZZ	MISS	SCAR	TENN	TAMU	VAN	Team	Div	SR	SW
ALA	7–23		1–2	1–2	0–3	0–3	.	1–2	0–3	.	1–2	2–1	.	1–2	0–3	ALA	W7	1–9	0–4
ARK	20–10	2–1		2–1	.	.	2–1	3–0	2–1	3–0	1–2	.	3–0	1–2	1–2	ARK	W1	7–3	3–0
AUB	14–16	2–1	1–2		.	1–2	.	1–2	1–2	.	2–1	2–1	3–0	1–2	0–3	AUB	W6	4–6	1–1
FLA	13–17	3–0	.	.		0–3	2–1	1–2	1–2	3–0	0–3	2–1	1–2	.	0–3	FLA	E5	4–6	2–3
UGA	21–9	3–0	.	2–1	3–0		2–1	2–1	0–3	3–0	.	3–0	1–2	.	2–1	UGA	E2	8–2	4–1
KEN	7–23	.	1–2	.	1–2	1–2		0–3	.	1–2	2–1	1–2	0–3	0–3	0–3	KEN	E7	1–9	0–4
LSU	17–13	2–1	0–3	2–1	2–1	1–2	3–0		3–0	1–2	1–2	.	.	2–1	.	LSU	W3	6–4	2–1
MSU	20–10	3–0	1–2	2–1	2–1	3–0	.	0–3		.	3–0	2–1	2–1	2–1	.	MSU	W2	8–2	3–1
MIZZ	13–16	.	0–3	.	0–3	0–3	2–1	2–1	.		2–1	3–0	2–1	1–1	1–2	MIZZ	E4	5–4	1–3
MISS	16–14	2–1	2–1	1–2	3–0	.	1–2	2–1	0–3	1–2		.	1–2	3–0	.	MISS	W5	5–5	2–1
SCAR	8–22	1–2	.	1–2	1–2	0–3	2–1	.	1–2	0–3	.		1–2	1–2	0–3	SCAR	E6	1–9	0–3
TENN	14–16	.	0–3	0–3	2–1	2–1	3–0	.	1–2	1–2	2–1	2–1		.	1–2	TENN	E3	5–5	1–2
TAMU	16–13	2–1	2–1	2–1	.	.	3–0	1–2	1–2	1–1	0–3	2–1	.		2–1	TAMU	W4	6–3	1–1
VAN	23–7	3–0	2–1	3–0	3–0	1–2	3–0	.	.	2–1	.	3–0	2–1	1–2		VAN	E1	8–2	5–0
Team	W–L	ALA	ARK	AUB	FLA	UGA	KEN	LSU	MSU	MIZZ	MISS	SCAR	TENN	TAMU	VAN	Team	Div	SR	SW

Updated for entire regular season. Missouri at Texas A&M series had one tie game.

== 2019 MLB draft ==
Player	Position	Round	Overall	MLB team
Deacon Medders	RHP	20	593	San Diego Padres
Davis Vainer	RHP	21	646	Houston Astros
Morgan McCullough	SS	22	661	Los Angeles Dodgers
Jeremy Randolph	LHP	26	785	St. Louis Cardinals
Brock Love	RHP	34	1,011	Miami Marlins

== See also ==
- 2019 Alabama Crimson Tide softball team
