= 2019 Texas A&M Aggies baseball team =

Texas baseball team

2019 Texas A&M Aggies baseball

Morgantown Regional, 2-2
- Conference: Southeastern Conference
- Western Division

Ranking
- Coaches: No. 21
- Record: 39–23–1 (16–13–1 SEC)
- Head coach: Rob Childress (14th season)
- Assistant coaches: Justin Seely; Will Bolt
- Home stadium: Olsen Field at Blue Bell Park

2019 Southeastern Conference baseball standings
	Conf.						Overall
Team	W		L		T	PCT	W		L		T	PCT
Eastern
No. 1 Vanderbilt ^{x}‍†‍‡‍^{y}	23	–	7	–	0	.767	58	–	12	–	0	.829
No. 18 Georgia ‍‍‍^{y}	21	–	9	–	0	.700	46	–	17	–	0	.730
Tennessee ‍‍‍^{y}	14	–	16	–	0	.467	40	–	21	–	0	.656
Missouri ‍‍‍	13	–	16	–	1	.450	34	–	22	–	1	.605
Florida ‍‍‍^{y}	13	–	17	–	0	.433	34	–	26	–	0	.567
South Carolina ‍‍‍	8	–	22	–	0	.267	28	–	28	–	0	.500
Kentucky ‍‍‍	7	–	23	–	0	.233	26	–	29	–	0	.473
Western
No. 5 Mississippi State ^{x}‍‍‍^{y}	20	–	10	–	0	.667	52	–	15	–	0	.776
No. 6 Arkansas ^{x}‍‍‍^{y}	20	–	10	–	0	.667	46	–	20	–	0	.697
No. 14 LSU ‍‍‍^{y}	17	–	13	–	0	.567	40	–	26	–	0	.606
No. 20 Texas A&M ‍‍‍^{y}	16	–	13	–	1	.550	39	–	23	–	1	.627
No. 12 Ole Miss ‍‍‍^{y}	16	–	14	–	0	.533	41	–	27	–	0	.603
No. 9 Auburn ‍‍‍^{y}	14	–	16	–	0	.467	38	–	28	–	0	.576
Alabama ‍‍‍	7	–	23	–	0	.233	30	–	26	–	0	.536
x – Division champion † – Conference champion ‡ – Tournament champion y – Invited to the NCAA tournament As of June 25, 2019; Rankings from D1Baseball

The 2019 Texas A&M Aggies baseball team represented Texas A&M University in the 2019 NCAA Division I baseball season. The Aggies play their home games at Blue Bell Park.

== Preseason ==
=== Preseason All-American teams ===
2nd Team

- John Doxakis - Starting Pitcher (D1Baseball)

3rd Team

- Braden Shewmake - Middle Infielder (Perfect Game)

=== SEC media poll ===
The SEC media poll was released on February 7, 2019 with the Aggies predicted to finish in fifth place in the Western Division.

Media poll (West)
Predicted finish	Team	Votes (1st place)
1	LSU	88 (10)
2	Ole Miss	65 (1)
3	Arkansas	59 (1)
4	Auburn	57 (1)
5	Texas A&M	48 (1)
6	Mississippi State	47
7	Alabama	21

=== Preseason All-SEC teams ===
2nd Team

- Braden Shewmake - Shortstop
- John Doxakis - Starting Pitcher

== Roster ==
2019 Texas A&M Aggies roster
Pitchers: 12 Joseph Menefee - Freshman; 14 John Doxakis - Junior; 17 Colson Geisler - Freshman; 18 Chandler Jozwiak - Sophomore; 21 Jonathan Childress - Freshman; 22 Brandon Birdsell - Freshman; 23 Christian Roa - Sophomore; 27 Kyle Richardson - Junior; 28 Mason Cole - (redshirt) Sophomore; 31 Kasey Kalich - Sophomore; 32 Bryce Miller - Sophomore; 35 Asa Lacy - Sophomore; 36 Landry Wideman - Freshman; 37 Dustin Saenz - Sophomore; 38 Chris Weber - Freshman; 39 Justin Ruble - Freshman	Catchers: 10 Hunter Coleman - Junior; 11 Aaron Walters - Sophomore; 41 Brandon Ashy - Junior; 44 Mikey Hoehner - Junior; Infielders: 0 Allonte Wingate - Senior; 1 Ty Coleman - Freshman; 2 Mason Corbett - Sophomore; 4 Hunter Watson - Freshman; 8 Braden Shewmake - Junior; 13 Chandler Morris - Senior; 15 Bryce Blaum - Junior; 33 Brett Brown - Freshman; 50 Will Frizzell - Sophomore; 55 Reed Spenrath - Freshman	Outfielders: 3 Miko Rodriguez - Freshman; 5 Logan Foster - Junior; 9 Zach DeLoach - Sophomore; 25 Cole Taylor - Sophomore; 30 Cam Blake - Junior; 34 Ty Condel - Junior; 46 Jonathan Ducoff - Senior

== Schedule and results ==
Legend
	Texas A&M win
	Texas A&M loss
	Texas A&M tie
	Postponement
**Bold**	Texas A&M team member

2019 Texas A&M Aggies baseball game log
Regular season (23–6–1)

February (8–2–0)
Date	Opponent	Rank	Site/stadium	Score	Win	Loss	Save	TV	Attendance	Overall record	SEC record
Feb. 15	Fordham		Blue Bell Park • College Station, TX	**W** 4–0	**John Doxakis (1–0)**	Matt Mikulski (0–1)		SECN+	6,516	1–0	
Feb. 16	Fordham		Blue Bell Park • College Station, TX	**W** 19–6	**Asa Lacy (1–0)**	Anthony DiMeglio (0–1)		SECN+	5,648	2–0	
Feb. 17	Fordham		Blue Bell Park • College Station, TX	**W** 3–1	**Christian Roa (1–0)**	Kyle Martin (0–1)	**Kasey Kalich (1)**	SECN+	4,764	3–0	
Feb. 19	Stephen F. Austin		Blue Bell Park • College Station, TX	**W** 5–3	**Bryce Miller (1–0)**	Derek Wells (0–1)	**Kasey Kalich (2)**	SECN+	3,765	4–0	
Feb. 20	Prairie View A&M		Blue Bell Park • College Station, TX	**W** 9–1	**Chris Weber** **(1–0)**	Brian Williams (0–1)		SECN+	4,013	5–0	
Feb. 22	UIC		Blue Bell Park • College Station, TX	**W** 3–1	**John Doxakis (2–0)**	Jacob Key (0–1)	**Kasey Kalich (3)**	SECN+	4,305	6–0	
Feb. 23	UIC		Blue Bell Park • College Station, TX	**W** 4–0	**Asa Lacy (2–0)**	Patrick Martin (0-1)		SECN+	5,112	7–0	
Feb. 24	UIC		Blue Bell Park • College Station, TX	**L** 2–7	**Jonathan Childress (0–1)**	Joey Fredrickson (1–0)		SECN+	4,607	7–1	
Feb. 26	Houston Baptist		Blue Bell Park • College Station, TX	**W** 12–5	**Bryce Miller (2–0)**	Daniel Endsley (0–2)		SECN+	3,378	8–1	
Feb. 27	Incarnate Word		Blue Bell Park • College Station, TX	**L** 5–6	Bernie Martinez (3–0)	**Christian Roa (1–1)**		SECN+	3,994	8–2	

March (15–4–1)
Date	Opponent	Rank	Site/stadium	Score	Win	Loss	Save	TV	Attendance	Overall record	SEC record
Mar. 1	vs. No. 15 Baylor; Shriners Hospitals for Children College Classic		Minute Maid Park • Houston, TX	**W** 5–2	**John Doxakis (3–0)**	Hayden Kettler (2–1)		AT&T SN	7,296	9–2	
Mar. 2	vs. No. 18 TCU; Shriners Hospitals for Children College Classic		Minute Maid Park • Houston, TX	**W** 1–0	**Asa Lacy (3–0)**	Brandon Williamson (2–1)	**Kasey Kalich (4)**	AT&T SN		10–2	
Mar. 3	vs. Houston; Shriners Hospitals for Children College Classic		Minute Maid Park • Houston, TX	**W** 3–2	**Chandler Jozwiak (1-0)**	**Christian Roa (1)**		AT&T SN		11–2	
Mar. 5	Texas A&M–Corpus Christi	No. 20	Blue Bell Park • College Station, TX	**W** 12–2^{7}	**Dustin Saenz (1-0)**	Tyler Miller (0-1)		SECN+		12–2	
Mar. 6	Abilene Christian	No. 20	Blue Bell Park • College Station, TX	**W** 9–3	**(Chandler Jozwiak (2-0)**	Brock Barger (1-2)		SECN+		13–2	
Mar. 8	Gonzaga	No. 20	Blue Bell Park • College Station, TX	**L** 4–6	Casey Legumina (2-0)	**John Doxaxis (3-1)**	Alek Jacob	SECN+		13–3	
Mar. 9	Gonzaga	No. 20	Blue Bell Park • College Station, TX	**W** 14–2	**Asa Lacy (4-0)**	Mac Lardner (0-3)	**Dustin Saenz (1)**	SECN+		14–3	
Mar. 10	Gonzaga	No. 20	Blue Bell Park • College Station, TX	**W** 3–1	**Joseph Menefee (1-0)**	Justin Blatner (1-1)	**Kasey Kalich (5)**	SECN+		15–3	
Mar. 12	at Dallas Baptist	No. 19	Horner Ballpark • Dallas, TX	**L** 4–5	MacGregor Hines (1–0)	**Chandler Jozwiak (2–1)**	Tyler Brown (3)			15–4	
Mar. 15	No. 1 Vanderbilt	No. 19	Blue Bell Park • College Station, TX	**L** 4–7	Drake Fellows (4–0)	**John Doxakis (3–2)**	Tyler Brown (3)	SECN+	5,774	15–5	0–1
Mar. 16	No. 1 Vanderbilt	No. 19	Blue Bell Park • College Station, TX	**W** 8–7	**Kasey Kalich (1–0)**	Zach King (0–2)		SECN+	7,104	16–5	1–1
Mar. 17	No. 1 Vanderbilt	No. 19	Blue Bell Park • College Station, TX	**W** 7–0	**Christian Roa (2–1)**	Kumar Rocker (1–2)		SECN+	5,385	17–5	2–1
Mar. 19	Rice	No. 13	Blue Bell Park • College Station, TX	**W** 8–3	**Chandler Jozwiak (3–1)**	Kel Bordwine (1–2)		SECN	5,255	18–5	
Mar. 22	at Kentucky	No. 13	Kentucky Proud Park • Lexington, KY	**W** 5–3	**Bryce Miller (3–0)**	Carson Coleman (2–3)	**Kasey Kalich (6)**	SECN+	3,270	19–5	3–1
Mar. 23	at Kentucky	No. 13	Kentucky Proud Park • Lexington, KY	**W** 9–3	**Asa Lacy (4–0)**	Grant Macciocchi (1–2)	**Chandler Jozwiak (1)**	SECN+	3,264	20–5	4–1
Mar. 24	at Kentucky	No. 13	Kentucky Proud Park • Lexington, KY	**W** 17–5	**Joseph Menefee (2–0)**	Jimmy Ramsey (2–1)	**Bryce Miller (1)**	SECN+	3,368	21–5	5–1
Mar. 26	Lamar	No. 10	Blue Bell Park • College Station, TX	**W** 10–7	**Brandon Birdsell (1–0)**	Jack Dallas (0–3)		SECN+	4,398	22–5	
Mar. 29	Missouri	No. 10	Blue Bell Park • College Station, TX	**W** 7-3	**Bryce Miller (4–0)**	Cameron Dulle (1–3)		SECN+	6,587	23–5	6–1
Mar. 30	Missouri	No. 10	Blue Bell Park • College Station, TX	**L** 2–3^{15}	Ian Bedell (2–1)	**Chandler Jozwiak (3–2)**	T.J. Sikkema (2)	SECN+	5,533	23–6	6–2
Mar. 31	Missouri	No. 10	Blue Bell Park • College Station, TX	**T** 2–2^{10}				SECN+	5,115	23–6–1	6–2–1

April (0–0–0)
Date	Opponent	Rank	Site/stadium	Score	Win	Loss	Save	TV	Attendance	Overall record	SEC record
April 2	at No. 12 Texas	No. 9	UFCU Disch-Falk Field • Austin, TX	**W** 9-6	**Dustin Saenz (2-0)**	Owen Meaney (0-1)	**Kasey Kalich (7)**	LHN	7,952	24–6-1	
April 5	at No. 13 LSU	No. 9	Alex Box Stadium • Baton Rouge, LA	**L** 1-2	Devin Fontenot (4-0)	**Bryce Miller (4-1)**		SECN+	10,547	24–7-1	6–3-1
April 6	at No. 13 LSU	No. 9	Alex Box Stadium • Baton Rouge, LA	**W** 6-4	**Asa Lacy (6-0)**	Eric Walker (2-2)	**Kasey Kalich (8)**	SECN	10,602	25–7-1	7–3-1
April 7	at No. 13 LSU	No. 9	Alex Box Stadium • Baton Rouge, LA	**L** 3-9	Cole Henry (3-1)	**Chandler Jozwiak (3-3)**		ESPNU	11,353	25–8-1	7–4-1
April 9	Texas State	No. 10	Blue Bell Park • College Station, TX	**L** 3-5	Brent Hebert (2-1)	Hunter McMahon (1)		SECN+	4,771	25–9-1	
April 12	Auburn		Blue Bell Park • College Station, TX					SECN+		–	–
April 13	Auburn		Blue Bell Park • College Station, TX					SECN+		–	–
April 14	Auburn		Blue Bell Park • College Station, TX					SECN+		–	–
April 16	at Houston		Schroeder Park • Houston, TX							–	
April 18	at South Carolina		Founders Park • Columbia, SC					SECN+		–	–
April 19	at South Carolina		Founders Park • Columbia, SC					SECN+		–	–
April 20	at South Carolina		Founders Park • Columbia, SC					SECN		–	–
April 23	UT Arlington		Blue Bell Park • College Station, TX					SECN+		–	
April 25	at Ole Miss		Swayze Field • Oxford, MS					SECN		–	–
April 26	at Ole Miss		Swayze Field • Oxford, MS					SECN+		–	–
April 27	at Ole Miss		Swayze Field • Oxford, MS					SECN+		–	–
April 30	at Sam Houston State		Don Sanders Stadium • Huntsville, TX							–	

May (0–0–0)
Date	Opponent	Rank	Site/stadium	Score	Win	Loss	Save	TV	Attendance	Overall record	SEC record
May 2	Mississippi State		Blue Bell Park • College Station, TX					SECN		–	
May 3	Mississippi State		Blue Bell Park • College Station, TX					SECN+		–	–
May 4	Mississippi State		Blue Bell Park • College Station, TX					SECN		–	–
May 10	at Alabama		Sewell–Thomas Stadium • Tuscaloosa, AL					SECN+		–	–
May 11	at Alabama		Sewell–Thomas Stadium • Tuscaloosa, AL					SECN+		–	–
May 12	at Alabama		Sewell–Thomas Stadium • Tuscaloosa, AL					SECN		–	–
May 16	Arkansas		Blue Bell Park • College Station, TX					SECN+		–	
May 17	Arkansas		Blue Bell Park • College Station, TX					SECN+		–	–
May 18	Arkansas		Blue Bell Park • College Station, TX					SECN+		–	–

Postseason (0–0–0)

SEC Tournament (0–0)
Date	Opponent	Seed/Rank	Site/stadium	Score	Win	Loss	Save	TV	Attendance	Overall record	SECT Record
May 21	vs. Florida		Hoover Metropolitan Stadium • Hoover, AL							–	–

Schedule source:

*Rankings are based on the team's current ranking in the Collegiate Baseball poll.

== Morgantown Regional ==
Morgantown Regional Teams
(1) West Virginia Mountaineers	(2) Texas A&M Aggies	(3) Duke Blue Devils	(4) Fordham Rams

First Round
1	West Virginia	6
4	Fordham	2
3	Duke	8
2	Texas A&M	5
Lower round 1
4	Fordham	2
2	Texas A&M	11

Semi-Finals
1	West Virginia	0
3	Duke	4
Lower final
1	West Virginia	10
2	Texas A&M	11

Finals
3	Duke	4
2	Texas A&M	1

== Record vs. conference opponents ==
Last two do not qualify for conf. tourn. Blank are not scheduled. Blue are home games, otherwise away.

2019 SEC baseball records Source: 2019 SEC baseball game results
Team	W–L	ALA	ARK	AUB	FLA	UGA	KEN	LSU	MSU	MIZZ	MISS	SCAR	TENN	TAMU	VAN	Team	Div	SR	SW
ALA	7–23		1–2	1–2	0–3	0–3	.	1–2	0–3	.	1–2	2–1	.	1–2	0–3	ALA	W7	1–9	0–4
ARK	20–10	2–1		2–1	.	.	2–1	3–0	2–1	3–0	1–2	.	3–0	1–2	1–2	ARK	W1	7–3	3–0
AUB	14–16	2–1	1–2		.	1–2	.	1–2	1–2	.	2–1	2–1	3–0	1–2	0–3	AUB	W6	4–6	1–1
FLA	13–17	3–0	.	.		0–3	2–1	1–2	1–2	3–0	0–3	2–1	1–2	.	0–3	FLA	E5	4–6	2–3
UGA	21–9	3–0	.	2–1	3–0		2–1	2–1	0–3	3–0	.	3–0	1–2	.	2–1	UGA	E2	8–2	4–1
KEN	7–23	.	1–2	.	1–2	1–2		0–3	.	1–2	2–1	1–2	0–3	0–3	0–3	KEN	E7	1–9	0–4
LSU	17–13	2–1	0–3	2–1	2–1	1–2	3–0		3–0	1–2	1–2	.	.	2–1	.	LSU	W3	6–4	2–1
MSU	20–10	3–0	1–2	2–1	2–1	3–0	.	0–3		.	3–0	2–1	2–1	2–1	.	MSU	W2	8–2	3–1
MIZZ	13–16	.	0–3	.	0–3	0–3	2–1	2–1	.		2–1	3–0	2–1	1–1	1–2	MIZZ	E4	5–4	1–3
MISS	16–14	2–1	2–1	1–2	3–0	.	1–2	2–1	0–3	1–2		.	1–2	3–0	.	MISS	W5	5–5	2–1
SCAR	8–22	1–2	.	1–2	1–2	0–3	2–1	.	1–2	0–3	.		1–2	1–2	0–3	SCAR	E6	1–9	0–3
TENN	14–16	.	0–3	0–3	2–1	2–1	3–0	.	1–2	1–2	2–1	2–1		.	1–2	TENN	E3	5–5	1–2
TAMU	16–13	2–1	2–1	2–1	.	.	3–0	1–2	1–2	1–1	0–3	2–1	.		2–1	TAMU	W4	6–3	1–1
VAN	23–7	3–0	2–1	3–0	3–0	1–2	3–0	.	.	2–1	.	3–0	2–1	1–2		VAN	E1	8–2	5–0
Team	W–L	ALA	ARK	AUB	FLA	UGA	KEN	LSU	MSU	MIZZ	MISS	SCAR	TENN	TAMU	VAN	Team	Div	SR	SW

Updated for entire regular season. Missouri at Texas A&M series had one tie game.

== Rankings ==
Ranking movements
	Week																			
Poll	Pre	1	2	3	4	5	6	7	8	9	10	11	12	13	14	15	16	17	18	Final
Coaches'		*																		
Baseball America																				
NCBWA†																				

† NCBWA ranks 30 teams in their preseason poll, but only ranks 25 teams weekly during the season.
* A new poll was not released for this week, so for comparison purposes, the previous week's ranking is inserted in this week's slot.

== 2019 MLB draft ==
Player	Position	Round	Overall	MLB team
Braden Shewmake	SS	1	21	Atlanta Braves
John Doxakis	LHP	2	61	Tampa Bay Rays
Kasey Kalich	RHP	4	127	Atlanta Braves
Mason Cole	RHP	27	805	Texas Rangers
