= Zac Kristofak =

American baseball player (born 1997)

- Pitcher
- Born: December 8, 1997 (age 28); Atlanta, Georgia, U.S.
- Batted: Right Threw: Right

MLB debut
- April 28, 2024, for the Los Angeles Angels

Last MLB appearance
- April 28, 2024, for the Los Angeles Angels

MLB statistics
- Win–loss record: 0–0
- Earned run average: 0.00
- Strikeouts: 2
- Stats at Baseball Reference

Teams
- Los Angeles Angels (2024)

Zachary Kristofak (born December 8, 1997) is an American former professional baseball pitcher. He played in Major League Baseball (MLB) for the Los Angeles Angels.

== Amateur career ==
Kristofak attended George Walton Comprehensive High School in Marietta, Georgia. The Atlanta Braves selected him in the 37th round of the 2016 MLB draft, but he did not sign and instead enrolled at the University of Georgia, where he played college baseball for the Georgia Bulldogs. In three seasons with the Bulldogs, Kristofak had a 12–3 win–loss record, a 4.29 earned run average, and 12 saves. In 2018, he played collegiate summer baseball with the Orleans Firebirds of the Cape Cod Baseball League.

== Professional career ==
=== Los Angeles Angels ===
The Los Angeles Angels drafted Kristofak in the 14th round, with the 421st overall selection of the 2019 Major League Baseball draft. After he signed with the Angels, Kristofak pitched for the Orem Owlz of the Rookie-level Pioneer League. He did not play in a game in 2020 due to the cancellation of the minor league season because of the COVID-19 pandemic.

Kristofak spent two seasons with the Tri-City Dust Devils of the High–A Northwest League. He played for the Rocket City Trash Pandas of the Double–A Southern League in 2023. As a relief pitcher, he had a 2.12 ERA in 17 innings before they moved him into the starting rotation. Kristofak made six starts for Rocket City before an injury ended his season. He began the 2024 season with the Salt Lake Bees of the Triple–A Pacific Coast League.

The Angels promoted Kristofak to the major leagues on April 28, 2024. He made his major league debut that day, pitching two innings of relief. Kristofak was designated for assignment by the Angels on May 1, and released by the organization on May 7. On May 17, Kristofak underwent Tommy John surgery, ending his season.

=== Piratas de Campeche ===
On June 24, 2025, Kristofak signed with the Piratas de Campeche of the Mexican League. In 14 games 13.1 innings of relief he went 1–0 with a 4.05 ERA and 14 strikeouts.

On February 5, 2026, Kristofak announced his retirement from baseball via his Instagram.

== Personal life ==
Zac has an older brother, Harrison. In December 2012, when Kristofak was 15 years old, his father, John, murdered his mother, Donna. His parents had divorced in August 2011 and his father had been imprisoned in March 2012 for stalking his mother. Kristofak stayed with the family of his neighbor and high school teammate, Carter Kieboom, in the days following the murder. John was sentenced to life in prison in 2013.
