= Head (disambiguation) =

The head is the part of an animal or human that usually includes the brain, eyes, ears, nose, and mouth. Head may refer specifically to a human head.

Head or Heads may also refer to:

== Arts, entertainment, and media ==
=== Music ===
==== Albums ====
- Heads (Bob James album), 1977
- Head (The Jesus Lizard album), 1990
- Head (The Monkees album), a 1968 soundtrack of the movie
- Heads (Osibisa album), 1972

==== Songs ====
- "Head" (Julian Cope song), 1991
- "Head", a song by Prince from Dirty Mind
- "Head", a song by Mark Lanegan from Bubblegum
- "Head", a song by Static-X from Beneath... Between... Beyond...
- "Head", a song by Todd Sheaffer from The Black Bear Sessions and Elko
- "Head", a song by Lotion from full Isaac
- "Head", a song by Nicola Roberts from Cinderella's Eyes
- "Head", a song by the Cooper Temple Clause from Make This Your Own
- "Head", a song by Don Patterson from Mellow Soul
- "Heads", a song by Hawkwind from The Xenon Codex
- "Heads", a song by James from Living in Extraordinary Times

==== Other music ====
- Head (band), an English rock band
- The Head (band), an indie rock band from Atlanta, Georgia
- Head (music), a main theme in jazz
- Drumhead, a membrane on a drum
- Headstock, a part of an instrument
- Brian Welch (born 1970), American musician better known as Head

=== Film and television ===
- Head (film), 1968, starring The Monkees
- Heads (film), a 1994 black comedy about a reporter investigating decapitations
- The Head (1959 film), a German horror film directed by Victor Trivas
- The Head (2003 film), a Russian black comedy
- The Head (1994 TV series), a 1994–1996 American animated television series
- The Head (2020 TV series), a 2020 psychological thriller series
- "Head" (Blackadder), a 1986 episode of Blackadder
- "Head" (American Horror Story), a 2013 episode of the anthology television series

=== Other arts ===
- Head (Csaky), a 1913 Cubist sculpture by Joseph Csaky
- Head (DC Comics), a minor character in the fictional DC universe

== Business ==
- Head (company), a manufacturer and marketer of skiing, snowboarding, swimming, tennis and other racket sports equipment including shoes
- Head Entertainment, a former British entertainment retailer
- Head Records, a British entertainment retailer

== Computing ==
- head (Unix), a UNIX command
- <head>, an HTML document structure element
- HEAD, an HTTP request method
- Head, a reference to a commit object to a Repository

== Maritime ==
- Head (watercraft), the toilet on a watercraft
- Head (sail), the uppermost corner part of a sail
- Head race or crew race, a time-trial rowing competition and related events called 'Head of the __ River'
- Headsail, any sail set forward of the foremost mast

== Science ==
- Head (botany), a structure composed of numerous individual flowers
- Head (geology), a recent near-surface deposit
- Head (linguistics), the word that determines the syntactic type of the phrase of which it is a member
- Head of tide, the highest point on a river affected by tidal fluctuations
- Head (hydrology), the point on a watercourse, up to which it has been changed by damming
- Headland, also known as a head, a type of peninsula
- High Energy Astrophysics Division, a division of the American Astronomical Society
- Hydraulic head, an elevation difference between two fluid surfaces that drives flow
  - Pressure head, a term used in fluid mechanics to represent the internal energy of a fluid due to the pressure exerted on its container
  - Total dynamic head, the total equivalent height that a fluid is to be pumped, taking into account friction losses in the pipe

== Technology ==
- Cylinder head, a part of an internal combustion engine
- Head (vessel), an end cap on a pressure vessel
- Head unit, a component of an automobile or home stereo system
- Recording head, the physical interface between a recording apparatus and a moving recording medium
  - Disk read-and-write head, part of a disk drive
- Sprinkler head, a component of a fire sprinkler system

== Titles ==
- Head coach, senior coach of an athletic team
- Head girl and head boy, positions in student government
- Head of government, the most senior executive of a cabinet and government
- Head of mission, the senior diplomat in a foreign post
- Head of state, the most senior public representative of a state
- Head teacher, the most senior teacher and leader of a school
- Head, a person who uses psychoactive drugs, such as a cokehead

== Other uses ==
- Head (surname), including a list of people with that name
- The Head, Queensland, a locality in Australia
- Beer head, a frothy emulsion at the top of a serving of beer
- Head of radius, part of the forearm bone
- Sydney Heads or simply The Heads, headlands that form the entrance to Sydney Harbour
- Viscount Head, a title in the Peerage of the United Kingdom
- Head baronets, two titles, one extinct in the Baronetage of England, the other extant in the Baronetage of the UK
- Head, the flat end of a barrel
- Head, slang for oral sex
- Heads, the obverse of a coin; as in "heads or tails"
- Head, also called loop, a part of Thai typography

== See also ==
- Headed (disambiguation)
- Header (disambiguation)
- Heading (disambiguation)
- Heads in heraldry
