= Head (surname) =

Surname list

Head is an English surname. Notable people with the surname include:

- Alicia Esteve Head (born 1973), Spanish impostor
- Anthony Head (1954–2026), English actor and musician
- Antony Head, 1st Viscount Head (1906–1983), British politician and diplomat
- Barclay V. Head (1844–1914), British numismatist
- Bessie Head (1937–1986), South African novelist
- Daisy Head (born 1991), English actress
- Don Head (ice hockey) (born 1933), Canadian ice hockey player
- Don Head (public servant), Canadian public servant
- Edith Head (1897–1981), American costume designer
- Emily Head (born 1988), English actress
- Francis Bond Head (1793–1875), British army officer
- Frederick Head (1874–1941), British-Australian Anglican archbishop
- George Head (1782–1855), British army officer
- George Head Head (c.1795–1876), British lawyer and banker
- Hannah Head (1941–2011), British train driver
- Henry Head (1861–1940), English neurologist
- Howard Head (1914–1991), American businessman
- Hudson Head (born 2001), American baseball player
- Jae Head (born 1996), American actor
- Joanne Head (1930–2021), American politician
- John Head (musician), English musician
- John Head (Gloucester MP) (died 1391), English politician
- John Head (Stockbridge MP) (c.1656–1711), English politician
- John L. Head (1915–1980), American basketball coach
- Lesley Head (born 1957), Australian geographer
- Lillian Brown Head (1921–2010), American fashion designer
- Louis Head (born 1990), American baseball player
- Luther Head (born 1982), American basketball player
- Murray Head (born 1946), British actor and singer
- Patrick Head (born 1945), English motorsport personality
- Paul Head (born 1965), English hammer thrower
- Richard Head (disambiguation), multiple people
  - Richard Head (c. 1637–1686), author and playwright
- Sara Head (born 1980), Welsh table tennis player
- Stacy Head (born 1969), American lawyer and politician
- Stephen Head (born 1984), American baseball player and scout
- T. Grady Head (1897–1965), Associate Justice of the Supreme Court of Georgia
- Thomas Head (1714–1779), English sheriff
- Tommy Head (1945–2024), American politician
- Travis Head (born 1993), Australian cricketer
- William K. Head (born 1947), American football coach
- William O. Head (1859–1931), American mayor
