= Mighty River =

Mighty River may refer to:

- "Mighty River" (song), a 2017 song by Mary J. Blige from the film Mudbound
- "Mighty River", a 2002 song by bluegrass/jam band Railroad Earth from the album Bird in a House
- Mighty River Power (now known as Mercury Energy), a New Zealand electrical power company
- "Mighty Rivers" (Kylie Minogue song), from the 2010 album Aphrodite

== See also ==
- Mighty Rivers (disambiguation)
