= William Head =

William Head may refer to:

- William O. Head (1859–1931), mayor of Louisville, Kentucky, 1909–1913
- William K. Head (born 1947), head football coach for the Kentucky State University Thorobreds
