= Header =

Header may refer to:

== Computers and engineering ==
- Header (computing), supplemental data at the beginning of a data block
  - E-mail header
  - HTTP header
- Header file, a text file used in computer programming (especially in C and C++)
- A pin header is a mainly male style of electrical connector on printed circuit boards, including motherboards, providing links to external devices
- Exhaust manifold, in automotive design

== Construction ==
- Lintels (headers), structural members in light-frame construction which run perpendicular to floor and ceiling joists, "heading" them off to create an opening
- Lintel (architecture), a structural member in post-and-lintel building construction
- Header (brickwork), a brick laid with its short side exposed
- In piping, a manifold or length of pipe that connects multiple smaller pipes

== Sports ==
- Header (sailing): a term used in sailboat racing to denote a wind shift
- Header, a herding dog with a specific method of interacting with its flock
- Header, a headlong fall, particularly from a penny-farthing bicycle
- Header (association football), use of the player's head to direct the ball in association football (soccer)
- Header, a competitor in the team roping rodeo event who specializes in roping a steer's head

== Other ==
- Header (film), a 2006 film
- Header (band), an Australian power pop band
- Page header, in printing or typography the material separated from the main body that appears at the top of a page
- Combine header or head, part of a combine harvester
- Stripper (agriculture), type of grain harvester

== See also ==
- Head (disambiguation)
- Headed (disambiguation)
- Heading (disambiguation)
- Footer (disambiguation)
