= Silverlake Lounge =

Music venue in Los Angeles, California, U.S.

Coordinates: 34.082942°N 118.273646°W

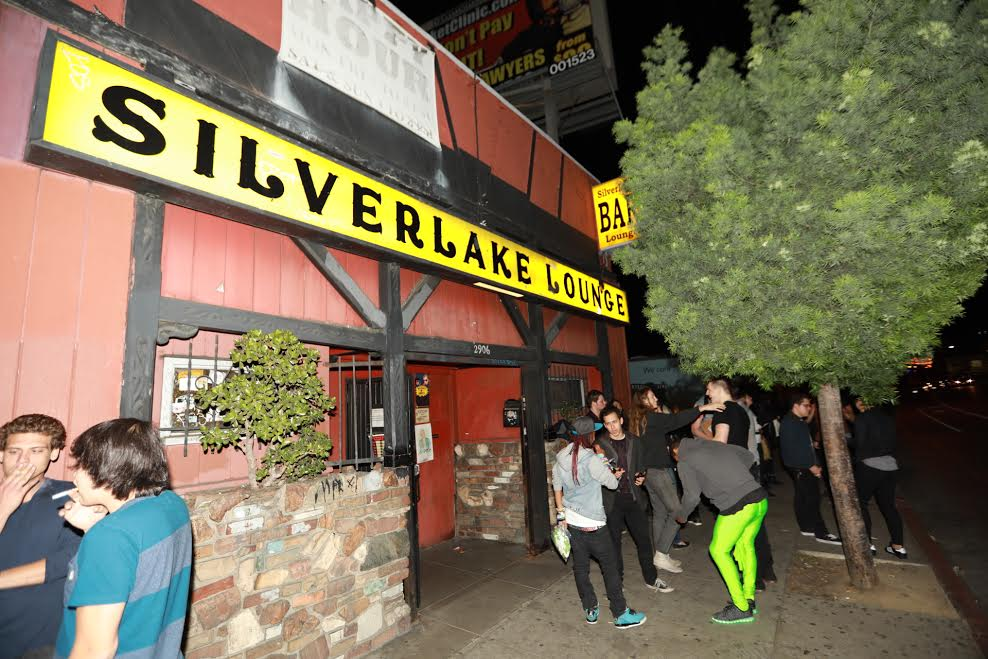
The outside of the bar November 17, 2016

Silverlake Lounge is a music venue in Silver Lake, Los Angeles.

Located in the heart of Los Angeles's Silver Lake neighborhood, at the corner of Sunset Boulevard and Silver Lake, Silverlake Lounge is one of the most storied venues in the area. The bar, originally noted for its drag and burlesque shows (which continue to this day) and divey atmosphere, gained notoriety in the early 2000s as one of the central hubs for the neighborhood's growing arts scene. Silverlake Lounge was the home to many of the era's most well recognized acts, due to booking company The Fold. Of all the Silver Lake music venues that existed during this early period, Silverlake Lounge remains the longest standing, although Spaceland, just down the street, did close, remodel and rebrand itself The Satellite and continued to showcase music until its closure in 2020.

== Performances and atmosphere ==
The band Silversun Pickups took their name from the liquor store across the street from Silverlake Lounge. Black Rebel Motorcycle Club played there regularly (often with bands such as Brian Jonestown Massacre and The Warlocks), including a three night weekend stint, just before they were signed to their record contract. Later, bands such as Local Natives, Lord Huron, King Washington, Nacosta, and Silver Snakes played weekly Monday night residencies at the venue.

Silverlake Lounge was often the setting for wild antics and other happenings that have become part of local folklore. Booker Scott Sterling once threatened Black Lips that he would "kick their amps in if they pissed on the stage. They did, and I did." Just before a show by Metric, the club installed a new subwoofer system without time to adequately test it. When the band began playing, the excessive bass knocked the liquor bottles off the shelf behind the bar. The lounge was known for its dark, low stage and its "Salvation" sign, first used for a show by hardcore band 400 Blows. LA band The Movies once were so upset with Sterling that they threatened to smash the sign to bits, but they were prevented in doing so. When Sterling left Silverlake Lounge, he took the iconic Salvation sign with him; it has been replaced by a new, arched sign reading "Silverlake".

== Notable performers ==
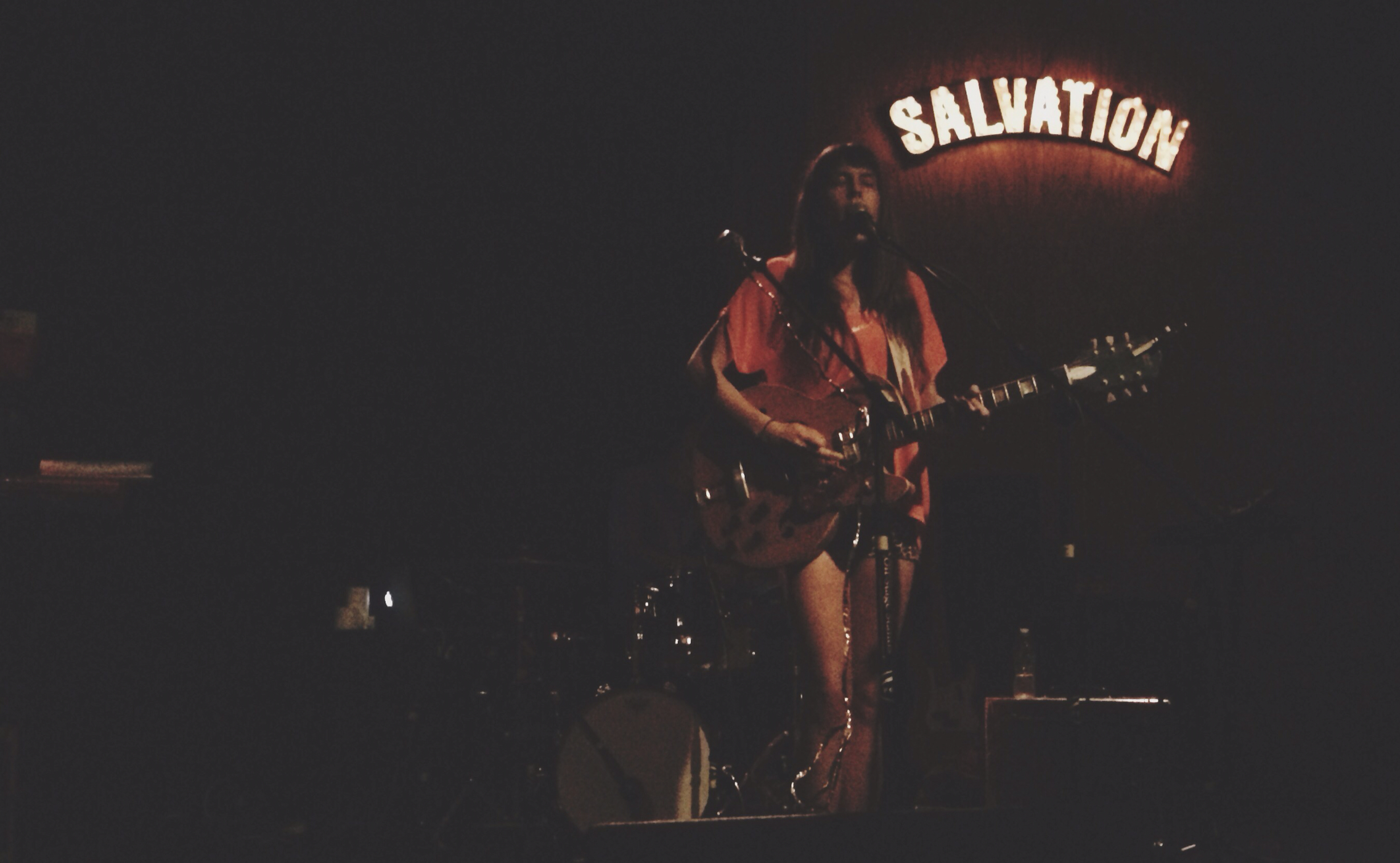
Madi Diaz performing in front of the classic "Salvation" sign

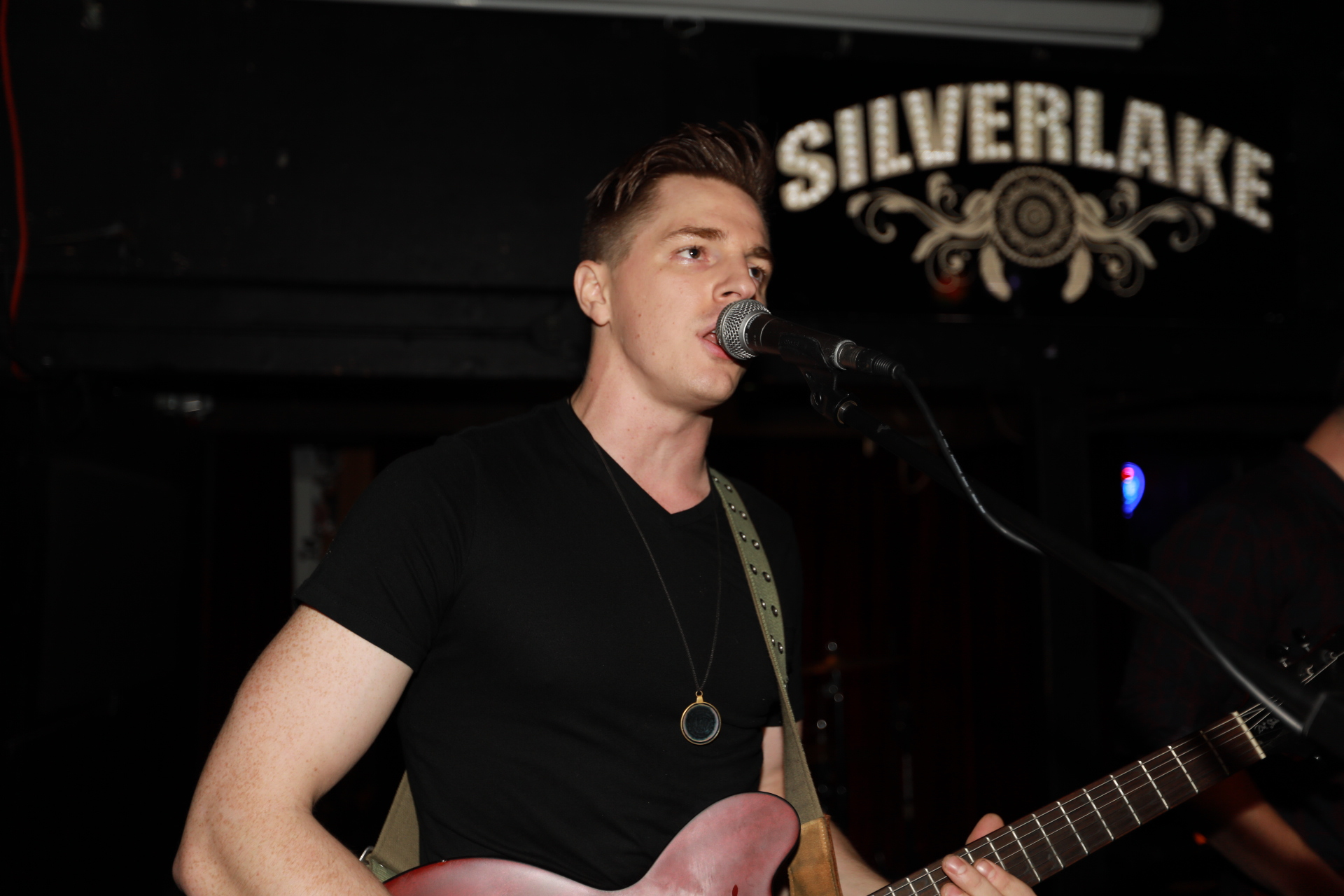
Ben Foerg of The Absurd, playing in front of the new Silverlake sign

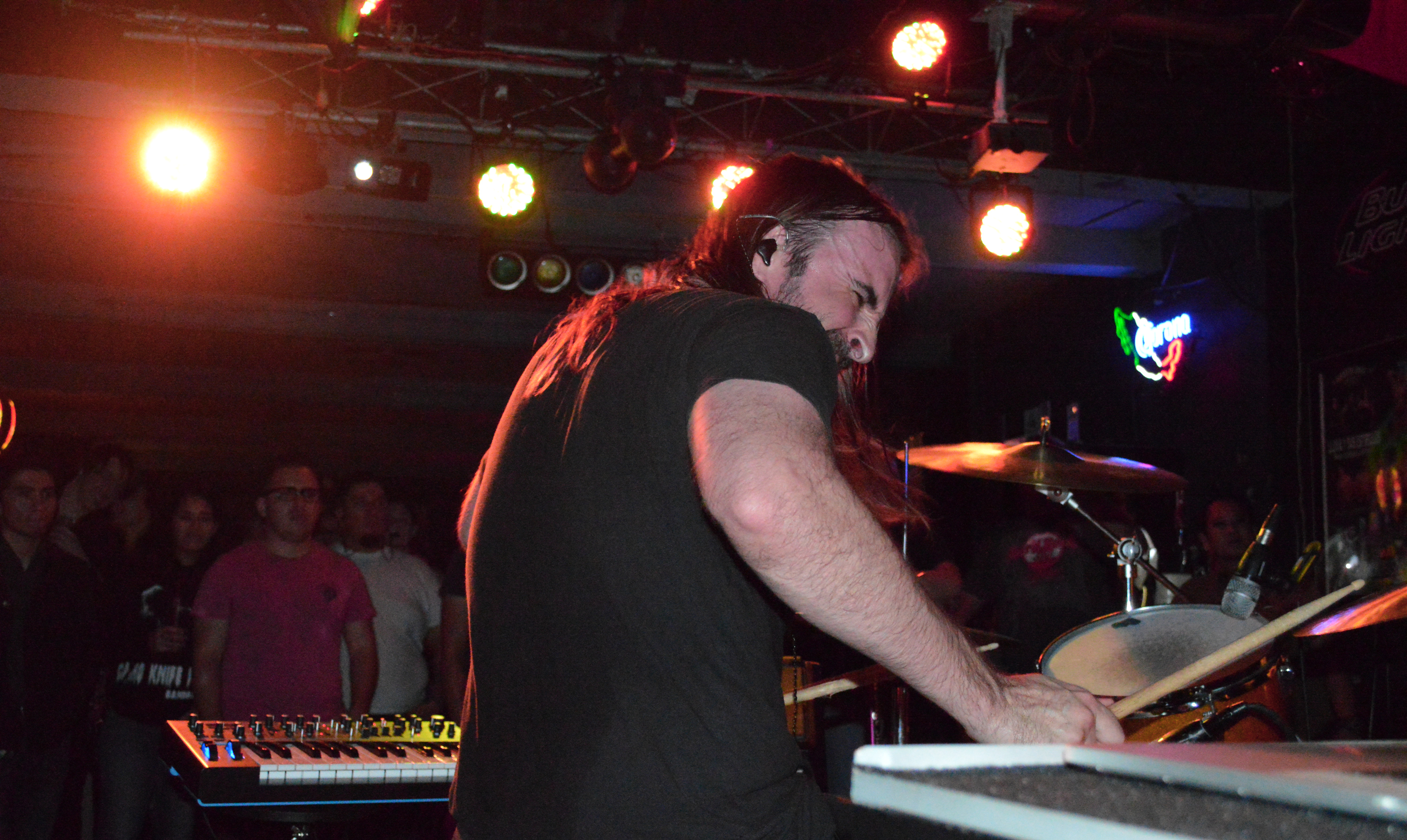
Cairo Knife Fight performing at Silverlake Lounge in July 2017

- Silversun Pickups
- Black Rebel Motorcycle Club
- Elliott Smith
- Metric
- Local Natives
- Cold War Kids
- Icebird
- Tame Impala
- Ty Segall & The Muggers
- Wye Oak
- Lord Huron
- The Warlocks
- The Mowglis
- ...And You Will Know Us by the Trail of Dead
- Cairo Knife Fight
- Dengue Fever
- Grouplove
- Devendra Banhart
- Black Lips
- Girls
- Those Darlins
- Futurebirds
- Wovenhand
- Avi Buffalo
- Madi Diaz
- Vanessa Silberman
- The Nocturnes
- Glasser
- The Head
- The Breeders
- El Ten Eleven
