= Headstock (disambiguation) =

Headstock is a part of guitar or similar stringed instrument.

Headstock may also refer to:

- Headstock (mine), the structure above an underground mine shaft
- Headstock (rolling stock), part of a rail vehicle
- Headstock, part of a lathe
- Headstock, the hold on a ring of bells

== See also ==
- Head (disambiguation)
