= David Bednar (baseball) =

American baseball player (born 1994)

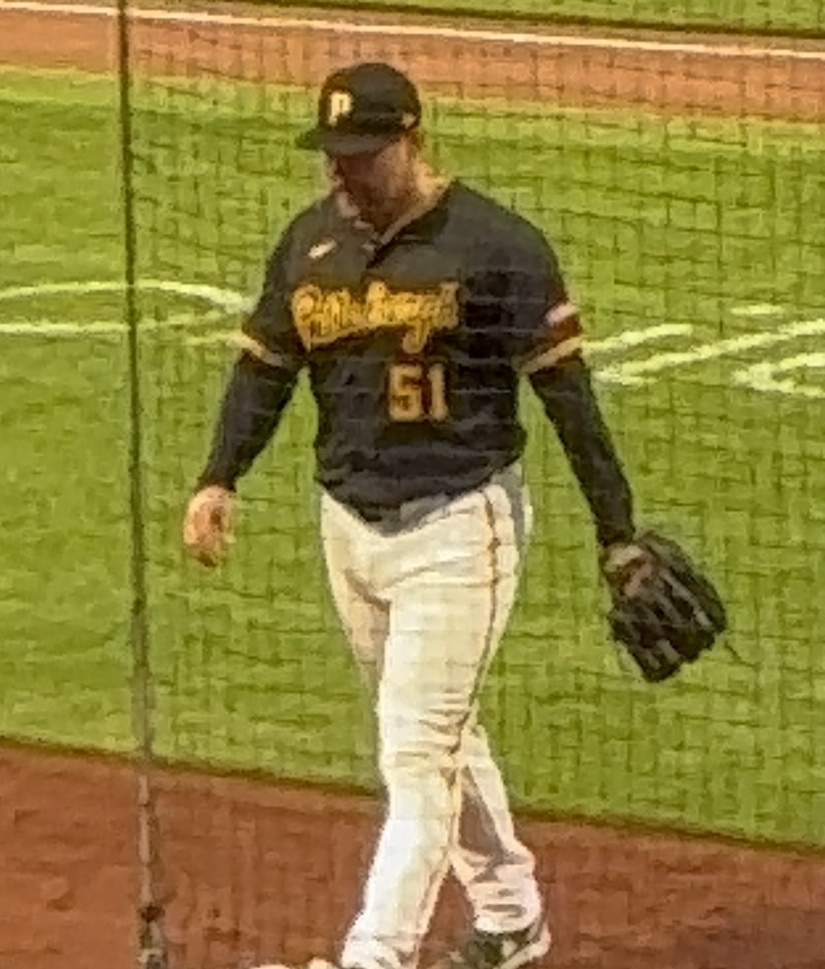
- Bednar with the Pittsburgh Pirates in 2025

New York Yankees – No. 53
- Pitcher
- Born: October 10, 1994 (age 32); Pittsburgh, Pennsylvania, U.S.
- Bats: Left Throws: Right

MLB debut
- September 1, 2019, for the San Diego Padres

MLB statistics (through 2026 season)
- Win–loss record: 25–26
- Earned run average: 3.03
- Strikeouts: 464
- Saves: 146
- Stats at Baseball Reference

Teams
- San Diego Padres (2019–2020); Pittsburgh Pirates (2021–2025); New York Yankees (2025–present)

Career highlights and awards
- 2× All-Star (2022, 2023); NL saves leader (2023)
Medals
Men's baseball
Representing United States
World Baseball Classic
Silver medal – second place	2023 Miami	Team
Silver medal – second place	2026 Miami	Team

David Jeffrey Bednar (born October 10, 1994), nicknamed "The Renegade" and El Oso (Spanish for 'the Bear'), is an American professional baseball pitcher for the New York Yankees of Major League Baseball (MLB). He has previously played for the San Diego Padres and Pittsburgh Pirates. The Padres selected Bednar in the 35th round of the 2016 MLB draft.

== Amateur career ==
Bednar attended Mars Area High School in Mars, Pennsylvania. Undrafted out of high school, Bednar attended Lafayette College in Easton, Pennsylvania, where he played college baseball for the Leopards.

== Professional career ==
=== San Diego Padres ===
The San Diego Padres selected Bednar in the 35th round, with the 1,044th overall selection, of the 2016 MLB draft. He signed with the Padres and split the 2016 season between the Tri-City Dust Devils and the Fort Wayne TinCaps, combining to a 4–4 win–loss record with a 2.32 earned run average (ERA) in 31 innings pitched. He split the 2017 season between Fort Wayne and the Lake Elsinore Storm, going a combined 1–4 with a 2.64 ERA in 60 innings. He spent the 2018 season in Lake Elsinore, going 2–4 with a 2.73 ERA in 69 innings. Bednar played for the San Antonio Missions in the 2018 Texas League playoffs. In 2019, he spent the minor league season with the Amarillo Sod Poodles, going 2–5 with a 2.95 ERA in 58 innings.

On September 1, 2019, the Padres selected Bednar's contract and promoted him to the major leagues. He made his major league debut that day versus the San Francisco Giants, pitching a scoreless inning in relief. Bednar produced a 0–2 record with a 6.55 ERA and 14 strikeouts over 11 innings pitched in 2019. In 2020 for San Diego, Bednar recorded a 7.11 ERA with five strikeouts in 6 1/3 innings.

=== Pittsburgh Pirates ===
On January 19, 2021, Bednar was traded to the Pittsburgh Pirates as part of a three-team trade that also sent Omar Cruz, Drake Fellows, Hudson Head and Endy Rodríguez to the Pirates, Joe Musgrove to the Padres and Joey Lucchesi to the New York Mets. In his first full season in the major leagues, Bednar was 3–1 with a 2.23 ERA and 77 strikeouts in 61 appearances. Bednar received a single vote in National League Rookie of the Year voting, tying him for eighth place with Vladimir Gutiérrez.

Bednar began the 2022 season with a 2.63 ERA and 15 saves in 41 innings pitched, and was named to the MLB All-Star Game.

After struggling to a 6.32 ERA in 50 games in 2024, Bednar was removed from the closer role on August 30, 2024.

Bednar began the 2025 season with a 2.73 ERA and 12 saves in 29 2/3 innings pitched. Bednar was optioned to Triple-A during the first week of the season. For June, Bednar surrendered 1 unearned run over 10 innings (0.00 ERA) and struck out 16 batters, and was recognized as National League (NL) Reliever of the Month, his second career monthly award.

=== New York Yankees ===
On July 31, 2025, the Pirates traded Bednar to the New York Yankees in exchange for Rafael Flores, Edgleen Perez and Brian Sanchez.

On November 17, 2026, Bednar accepted the Yankees' 1 year, $23.5 million qualifying offer to return to the team for the 2027 season.

== Personal life ==
Bednar was born in Pittsburgh but raised in Mars, Pennsylvania. Bednar's younger brother, Will, is a pitcher in the San Francisco Giants organization. Bednar’s nickname, "the Renegade", is in homage to the Styx song of the same name; commonly used as a pump-up song for his hometown Pittsburgh Steelers, as well as a song used whenever he enters games. His Spanish nickname "El Oso" was given to him by his Yankees teammates during the 2025 season.
