= Headed =

Headed may refer to:

- A headed phrase, in linguistics
- Headed notepaper

== See also ==
- Head (disambiguation)
- Header (disambiguation)
- Heading (disambiguation)
