= Mighty Rivers =

Mighty Rivers may refer to:

- "Mighty Rivers", a 1985 song by Graham Parker and The Shot from Steady Nerves
- "Mighty Rivers", a 2010 song by Kylie Minogue from Aphrodite
- "Mighty Rivers", a 2011 song by John Wetton from Raised in Captivity

== See also ==
- Jeremy Wade's Mighty Rivers, a 2018 Animal Planet TV show hosted by Jeremy Wade
- Mighty River (disambiguation)
