= Railroad Earth =

American Americana/bluegrass band

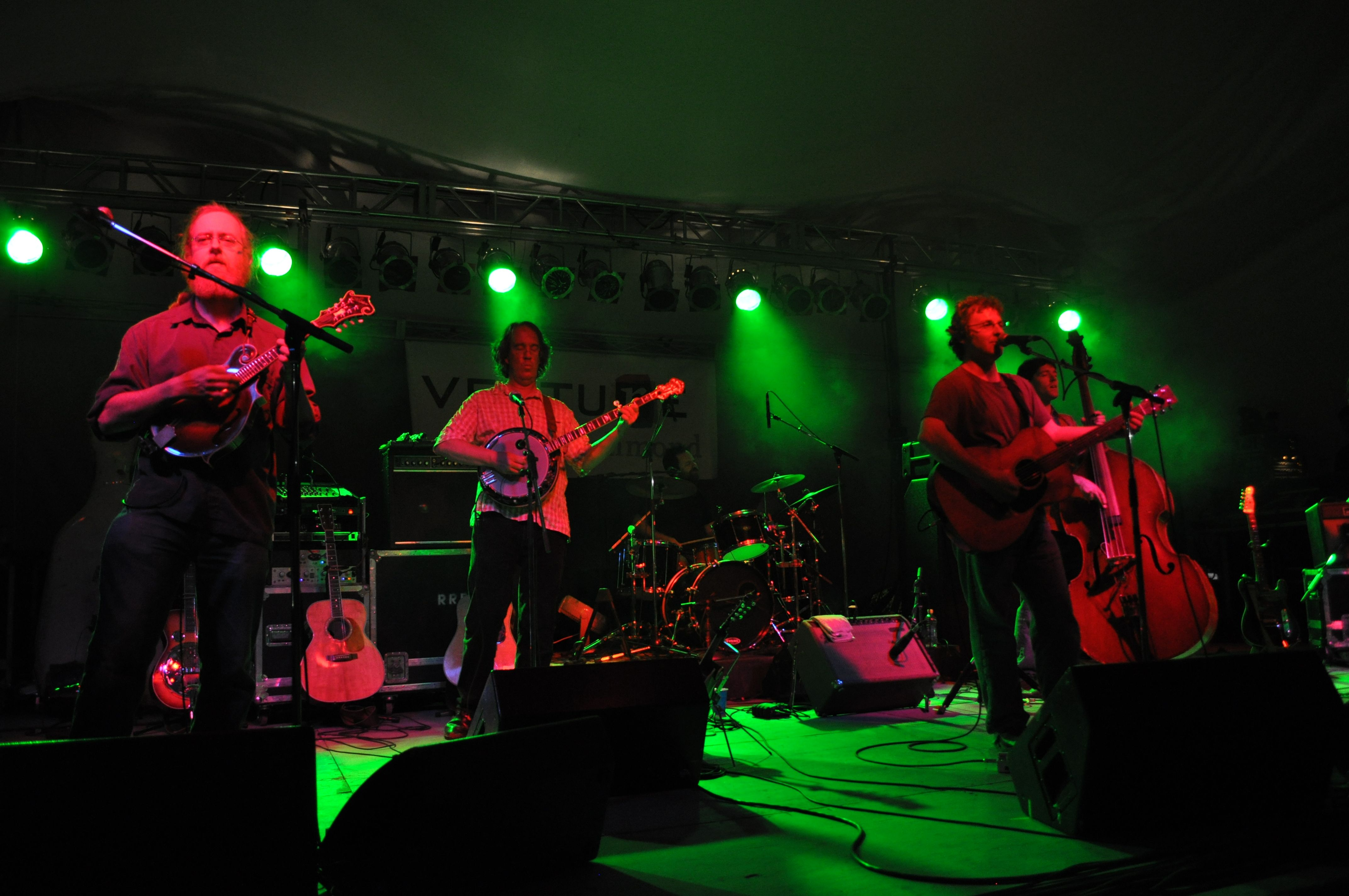
- Railroad Earth playing in May 2010

Background information
- Origin: Stillwater, New Jersey, United States
- Genres: Folk rock, Progressive Bluegrass, Bluegrass, Americana, Jam band
- Years active: 2001–present
- Labels: SCI Fidelity, Black Bear Records, One Haven Music
- Members: Todd Sheaffer; Tim Carbone; John Skehan; Carey Harmon; Matt Slocum; George Guthrie; Andrew Ryan
- Past members: Dave Von Dollen; Johnny Grubb; Andy Goessling (deceased); Andrew Altman; Mike Robinson; Dave Speranza
- Website: railroad.earth

Railroad Earth is a bluegrass-influenced Americana band formed in Stillwater, New Jersey in 2001. The band's music combines elements of progressive bluegrass, folk, rock, country, jazz, Celtic and other Americana influences. Recognized as "carrying on the tradition of improvisational, genre-spanning music laid forth by the Grateful Dead," Railroad Earth is known for lyrical songwriting and extensive live improvisation. The band takes its name from the Jack Kerouac prose poem "October in the Railroad Earth". The band also has a song of the same name.

== History ==
The band was originally formed in 2001, and was composed of vocalist/guitarist/songwriter Todd Sheaffer, violinist/vocalist Tim Carbone, mandolinist John Skehan, multi-instrumentalist Andy Goessling, drummer/vocalist Carey Harmon, and bassist Dave Von Dollen. Though each member was aware of one another, it was only Todd, Tim, and Andy who had played together. Tim, had joined Todd's band From Good Homes on stage, in addition Tim and Andy having a 20-year friendship through their former bands, The Blue Sparks From Hell, and New Jersey rock outfit Kings in Disguise.

When rehearsals of original music, mostly written by Sheaffer, began occurring, the band soon realized that something musically unique was happening. After three weeks of rehearsing, they went into a local recording studio to track a five-song demo.

Recorded live with no overdubs except backing vocals, this untitled demo set Railroad Earth's career in motion. Within a week, they landed a slot at Telluride Bluegrass Festival, an appearance that was only the new band's tenth as Railroad Earth. The previous nine gigs had been little more than warm-ups at small North Jersey bars and Elks lodges and a couple of support slots for regional bands.

Realizing immediately how strong the initial five-song demo was, the band decided to return to the same studio to cut another five tracks to complete an album for release in time to debut at the Telluride Bluegrass Festival. In early April 2001, the band tracked another five songs, and The Black Bear Sessions was completed. It was released to the public in June 2001, just one week before their appearance at Telluride. That album contains what are still some of the most popular songs in Railroad Earth's repertoire, including "Seven Story Mountain," "Head" and, of course, "Railroad Earth."

The band was approached by Sugar Hill Records after seeing their performance at Telluride. Right after their show, Railroad Earth was offered a record deal on the spot.

In June 2002, Railroad Earth released their second album Bird in a House, on Sugar Hill Records, featuring the songs "Like A Buddha," "Mighty River," and the title track. The band's touring schedule increased significantly over the following year and their fanbase grew accordingly, drawing attention from promoters, radio stations and media outlets. The group became a regular presence on jam-band and rock/folk festival lineups. Their fans, who referred to themselves as "Hobos," increased by number and the band correspondently performed in larger venues.

In late March 2003, Dave Von Dollen was replaced by Atlanta-based bassist Johnny Grubb. The following year, the band released its third studio effort, The Good Life, featuring "Storms", "Mourning Flies" and "Goat". The band continued to tour throughout the country, and its first live album, Elko, was issued in late January 2006. They performed at the Austin City Limits Music Festival on September 15, 2007.

The band's fourth studio album, titled Amen Corner, was released on June 10, 2008. The album features songs such as "Been Down This Road," "Hard Livin'," "The Forecast," and "Lovin' You."

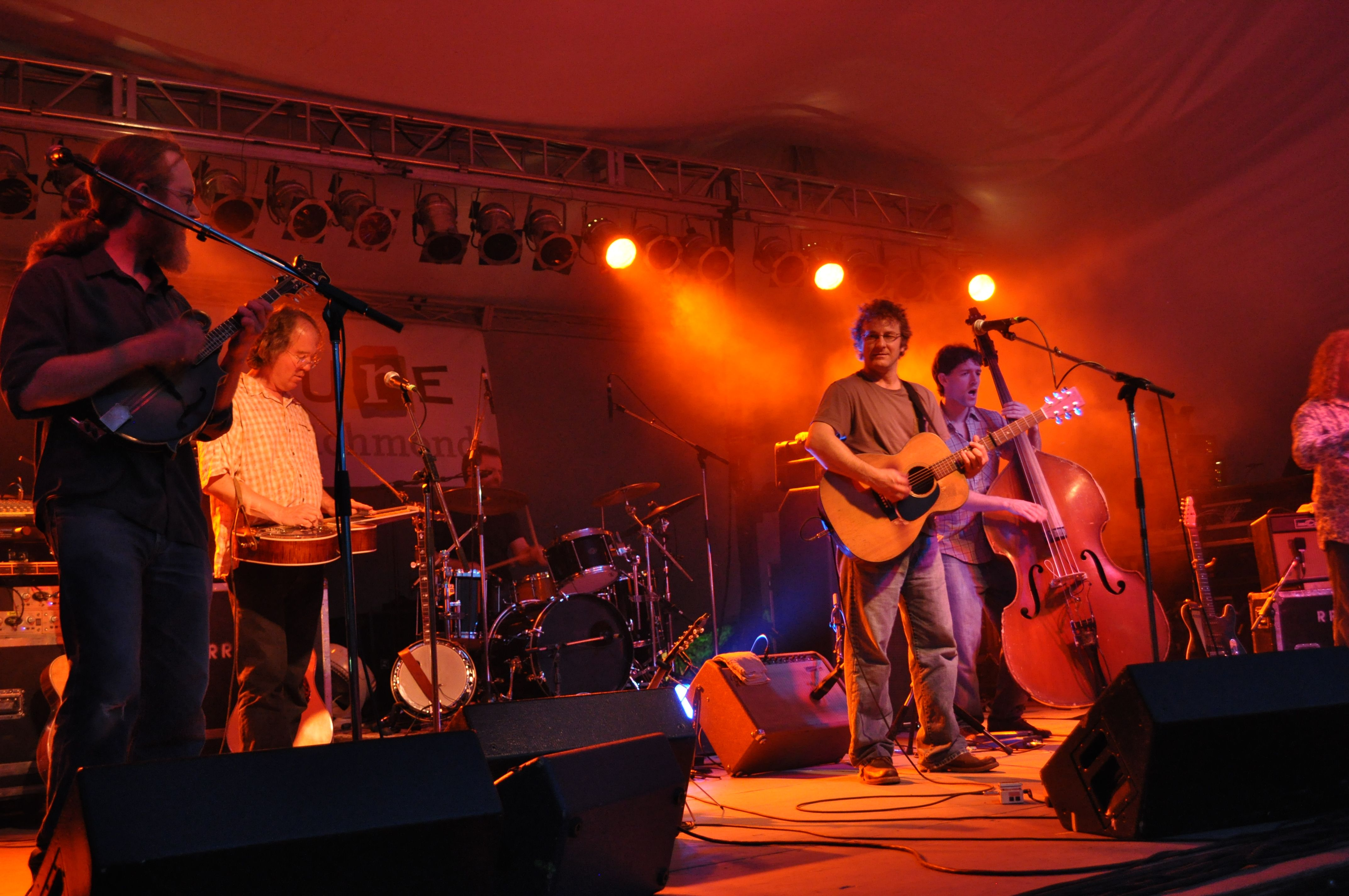
Railroad Earth playing Friday Cheers on May 21, 2010 in Richmond, Virginia

On November 11, 2009, Grubb announced his departure from the band after Railroad Earth's New Year's Eve run of shows in Portland, Oregon. In February 2010, Andrew Altman of the Codetalkers and Blueground Undergrass was named as his successor.

The band's self-titled, fifth album was released on Oct 12, 2010. The album featured new songs from Todd Sheaffer including "Jupiter and the 119" and " Too Much Information" plus an 11-minute instrumental, written by John Skehan, "Spring-Heeled Jack." It is the second-longest studio track to date for the band.

In February 2013 Railroad Earth performed at the Jefferson Theatre at the University of Virginia, and at Workplay in Birmingham, Alabama.

On January 14, 2014, Railroad Earth released their seventh album, Last of the Outlaws, to rave reviews from media and fans alike. It featured the 21-minute-long "suite" of "All That's Dead May Live Again" and "Face With a Hole" both written by Todd Sheaffer, and featured instrumental movements written by John Skehan In the tour that followed Railroad Earth headlined Red Rocks for the second time, selling out, and with the help of the Mile High Horns (arranged by Jay Rattman). The result can be seen on the DVD Live at Red Rocks.

Railroad Earth backed Warren Haynes on February 3, 2015 for a taping of the PBS series Front and Center for airing in May 2015. There were also studio Haynes tracks recorded with Railroad Earth.

In May 2018, Railroad Earth released a 7" vinyl EP in collaboration with the John Denver estate called Railroad Earth: The John Denver Letters. The project included lyrics penned by John Denver with music composed by Todd Sheaffer and performed by Railroad Earth. The album was released on Earth Day and a portion of proceeds went to benefit Youth Climate Strike in honor of both artists commitment to the environment.

The members of Railroad Earth have also released numerous solo albums. In 2009, Skehan released a duet album with mandolinist Todd Collins, performing the eighteenth-century Italian sonatas of Emanuele Barbella. In 2010 Carbone co-founded the jamband supergroup The Contribution with Keith Moseley and Jason Hann of String Cheese Incident along with Jeff Miller and Phil Ferlino of New Monsoon. Carbone has also produced albums by many bands, including Greensky Bluegrass and Great American Taxi. In 2015 Carbone contributed to Waywords and Meansigns, a collaborative project setting James Joyce's Finnegans Wake to music.

Andy Goessling (born Andrew James Goessling on February 5, 1959) died of cancer on October 12, 2018, at age 59, as announced by the band.

After a succession of special guests throughout 2019, the band has settled on a new touring ensemble featuring Matthew D. Slocum on keyboards and Mike Robinson on pedal steel, banjo, and guitar. Railroad Earth entered the studio in 2019 to record 2022 album All For the Song.

Andrew Altman announced his departure from Railroad Earth at the end of November, 2022. The bassist’s final shows with the group took place during their Horn O’Plenty event in Stroudsburg, PA on November 25 and 26.

Just prior to their appearance at Strings & Sol 2023, Railroad Earth announced that Dave Speranza would be joining them as their new bassist.

== Personnel ==
=== Current members ===
- Todd Sheaffer – guitar, harmonica, vocals, (2001–present)
- Tim Carbone – violin, accordion, electric guitar, vocals (2001–present)
- John Skehan – mandolin, bouzouki, piano, banjo, vocals (2001–present)
- Carey Harmon – drums, hand percussion, vocals (2001–present)
- Matt Slocum - piano, organ (2018 - present)
- George Guthrie - banjo, guitar (2025 - present)
- Andrew Ryan - bass (2025 - present)

=== Former members ===
- Dave Von Dollen – bass, vocals (2001–2003)
- Johnny Grubb – bass, vocals (2003–2009)
- Andy Goessling – acoustic and electric guitars, banjo, dobro, mandolin, flute, pennywhistle, bass clarinet, percussion, clarinet, lap steel, soprano saxophone, alto saxophone, tenor saxophone, baritone saxophone, vocals (2001–2018; his death)
- Andrew Altman – bass, vocals (2010–2022)
- Mike Robinson - guitar, pedal steel, banjo (2019 - 2025)
- Dave Speranza – bass (2022 - 2025)

== Discography ==
=== Albums ===
Year	Title	Label
2001	The Black Bear Sessions	Bos Music
2002	Bird in a House	Sugar Hill
2004	The Good Life	Sugar Hill
2006	Elko (Live)	SCI Fidelity
2008	Amen Corner	SCI Fidelity
2010	Railroad Earth	One Haven Music
2014	Last of the Outlaws	Black Bear
2017	Captain Nowhere (EP)	Black Bear
2019	The John Denver Letters (Single)	Windstar
2020	Live Tracks: Horn O' Plenty 11.30.19 (Live)	digital release only
2022	All for the Song	Black Bear
2026	Will of the Water	Ineffable
