= Omar Cruz =

Mexican baseball player (born 1999)

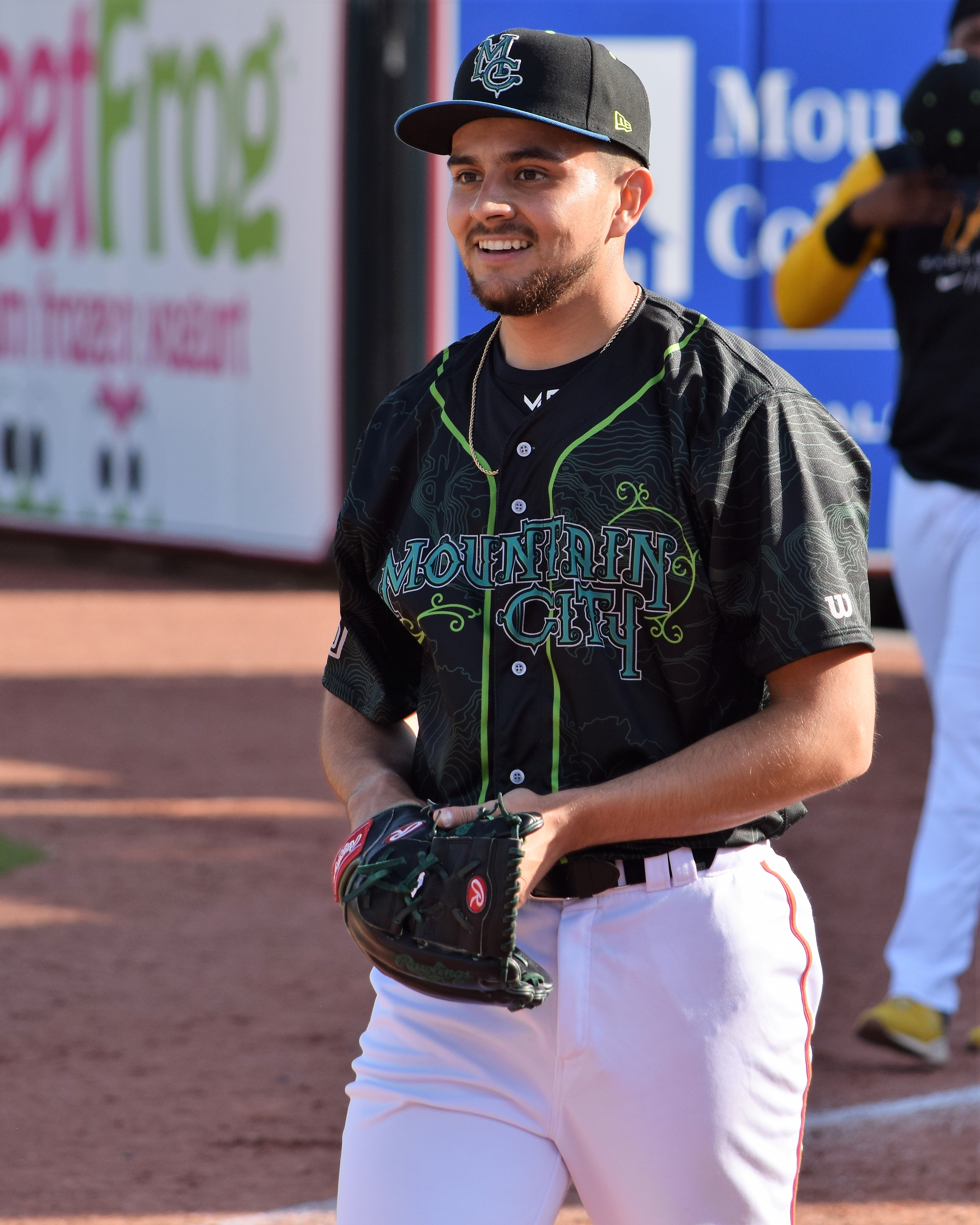
- Cruz in 2022 with the Altoona Curve

Washington Nationals
- Pitcher
- Born: January 26, 1999 (age 27); Hermosillo, Sonora, Mexico
- Bats: Left Throws: Left

MLB debut
- April 1, 2025, for the San Diego Padres

MLB statistics (through 2025 season)
- Win–loss record: 0–0
- Earned run average: 4.91
- Strikeouts: 5
- Stats at Baseball Reference

Teams
- San Diego Padres (2025)

Omar Alejandro Cruz (born January 26, 1999) is a Mexican professional baseball pitcher in the Washington Nationals organization. He has previously played in Major League Baseball (MLB) for the San Diego Padres. He made his MLB debut in 2025.

== Career ==
=== San Diego Padres ===
Cruz signed with the San Diego Padres as an international free agent on July 3, 2017. He made his professional debut in 2018 with the Rookie-level Arizona League Padres and was promoted to the Tri-City Dust Devils of the Low–A Northwest League in July. Over 11 games (ten starts) with the two clubs, he pitched to a 1–1 record with a 1.91 ERA, striking out 59 batters over 42 1/3 innings.

Cruz returned to Tri-City to begin the 2019 season before he was promoted to the Fort Wayne TinCaps of the Single–A Midwest League. He compiled a combined 2–3 record and 2.73 ERA over 12 starts, striking out 76 over 56 innings. Cruz did not play in a game in 2020 due to the cancellation of the minor league season because of the COVID-19 pandemic.

=== Pittsburgh Pirates ===
On January 19, 2021, Cruz (alongside David Bednar, Drake Fellows, Hudson Head, and Endy Rodríguez) was traded to the Pittsburgh Pirates in a three team deal that also sent Joe Musgrove to the Padres and Joey Lucchesi to the New York Mets. To begin the 2021 season, he was assigned to the Greensboro Grasshoppers of the High-A East. After seven starts in which he went 3–3 with a 3.45 ERA and 38 strikeouts over 28 2/3 innings, he was promoted to the Altoona Curve of the Double-A Northeast. Over 14 starts with Altoona, he went 3–4 with a 3.44 ERA over 70 2/3 innings. He returned to Altoona for the 2022 season. Over 23 games (five starts), Cruz posted a 3–3 record with a 5.03 ERA and 69 strikeouts over 62 2/3 innings.

=== San Diego Padres (second stint) ===
On December 6, 2023, Cruz was selected by the San Diego Padres in the minor league phase of the Rule 5 draft. He made 34 appearances split between the Double–A San Antonio Missions and Triple–A El Paso Chihuahuas, compiling a 6–2 record and 3.96 ERA with 118 strikeouts across 86 1/3 innings pitched. On November 19, 2024, the Padres added Cruz to their 40-man roster to protect him from the Rule 5 draft.

Cruz was initially optioned to Triple-A El Paso to begin the 2025 season. However, on March 27, 2025, it was announced that Cruz had made San Diego's Opening Day roster. He made two appearances for the Padres during his rookie campaign, recording a 4.91 ERA with five strikeouts across 3 2/3 innings pitched. On November 21, Cruz was non-tendered by San Diego and became a free agent.

On January 14, 2026, Cruz re-signed with the Padres organization on a minor league contract. In 21 games (2 starts) between Triple-A and Double-A throwing 32.2 innings going 3-2 with a 5.23 ERA with 51 strikeouts and one save. He elected free agency on November 2.

=== Washington Nationals ===
The Washington Nationals signed Cruz to a minor league contract with a spring training invite on November 18, 2026.

== See also ==
- Rule 5 draft results
