= Endy Rodríguez =

Dominican baseball player (born 2000)

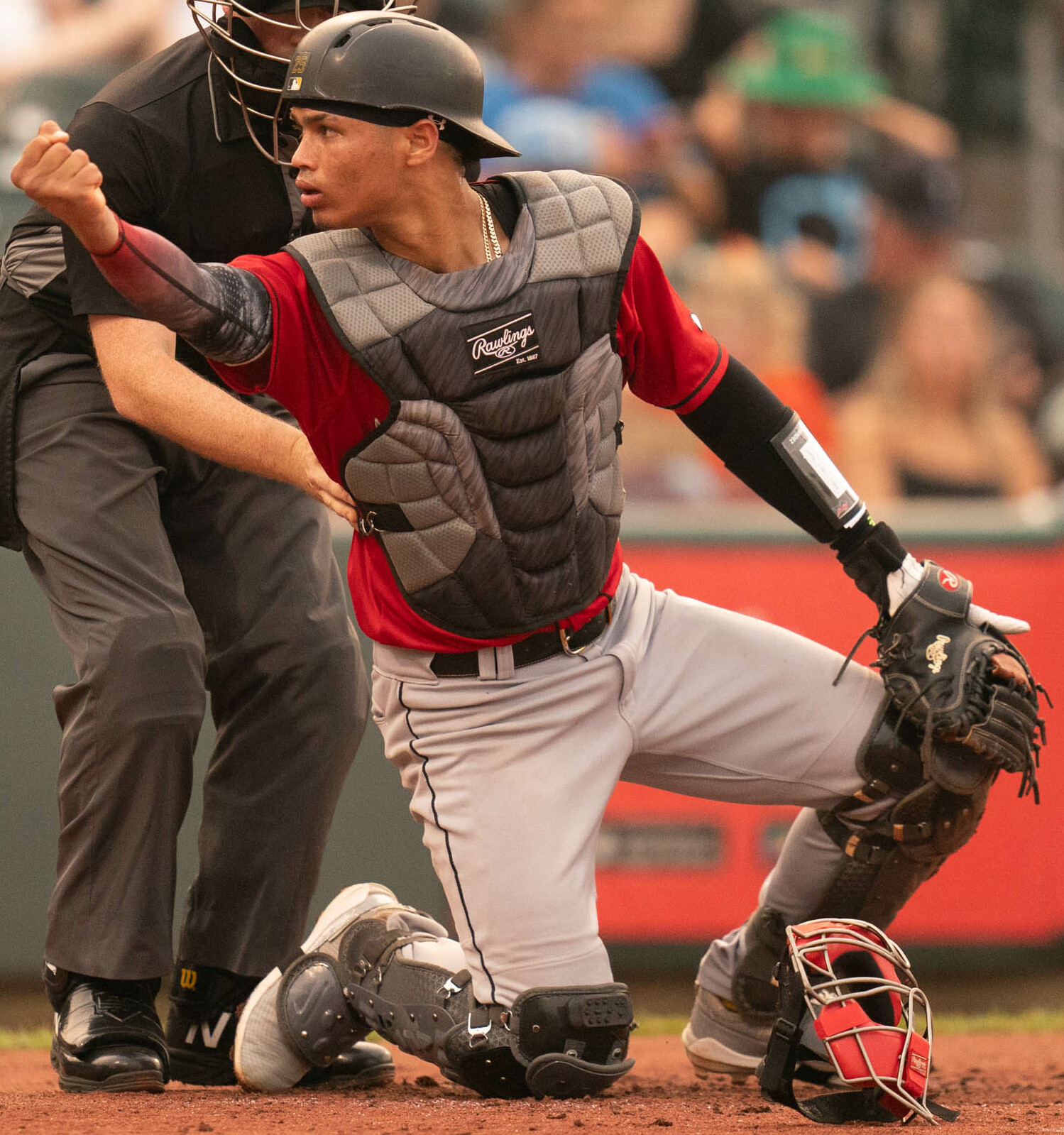
- Rodríguez with the Indianapolis Indians in 2023

Pittsburgh Pirates – No. 13
- Catcher / First baseman
- Born: May 26, 2000 (age 26); Santiago, Dominican Republic
- Bats: Switch Throws: Right

MLB debut
- July 17, 2023, for the Pittsburgh Pirates

MLB statistics (through 2026 season)
- Batting average: .231
- Home runs: 10
- Runs batted in: 35
- Stats at Baseball Reference

Teams
- Pittsburgh Pirates (2023, 2025–present)

Endy Steven Rodríguez (born May 26, 2000) is a Dominican professional baseball catcher for the Pittsburgh Pirates of Major League Baseball (MLB). He made his MLB debut in 2023.

== Career ==
=== New York Mets ===
Rodríguez signed with the New York Mets as an international free agent on July 2, 2018. He made his professional debut that year with the Dominican Summer League Mets. In 2019, he played for the DSL Mets and rookie-level Gulf Coast League Mets. Rodríguez did not play in a game in 2020 due to the cancellation of the minor league season because of the COVID-19 pandemic.

=== Pittsburgh Pirates ===
On January 19, 2021, Rodríguez was traded from the Mets to the Pittsburgh Pirates in a three-team trade between the Pirates, Mets and San Diego Padres; the Mets received Joey Lucchesi from San Diego, while the Padres acquired Joe Musgrove and the Pirates acquired Hudson Head, David Bednar, Drake Fellows, and Omar Cruz. Rodríguez started his Pirates career playing for the Bradenton Marauders and was named the Low-A Southeast Most Valuable Player. He began 2022 with the Greensboro Grasshoppers. He was promoted to the Double-A Altoona Curve in August 2022, and was promoted to the Triple-A Indianapolis Indians in September 2022. Rodríguez was named the 2022 South Atlantic League Top MLB Prospect and Most Valuable Player. On November 15, 2022, the Pirates added Rodríguez to their 40-man roster to protect him from the Rule 5 draft.

Rodríguez was optioned to Triple-A Indianapolis to begin the 2023 season. In 67 games for Indianapolis, he batted .268/.356/.415 with 6 home runs and 38 RBI. The Pirates promoted him to the major leagues for the first time on July 17, and he made his debut that day.

On December 12, 2023, it was announced that Rodríguez would miss the entirety of the 2024 season following reconstructive surgery on his UCL and his flexor tendon, a procedure that was performed the same day. He suffered an injury while hitting on November 13, in winter ball. In September 2024, he began playing rehab games with Double-A Altoona.

Rodríguez returned to major league action in 2025, hitting .173 with two RBI over his first 18 appearances. He was placed on the injured list due to right elbow inflammation on June 7, 2025, and was transferred to the 60-day injured list on June 13. On August 13, it was announced that Rodríguez had undergone ulnar nerve transposition surgery.

Rodríguez was optioned to Triple-A Indianapolis to begin the 2026 season. He made 45 total appearances for Pittsburgh, slashing .267/.373/.467 with seven home runs, 20 RBI, and six stolen bases. On August 13, Rodríguez was placed on the injured list due to inflammation in his left hip. On August 26, it was reported that Rodríguez had undergone season–ending hip labrum surgery.
