= Joe Musgrove =

American baseball player (born 1992)

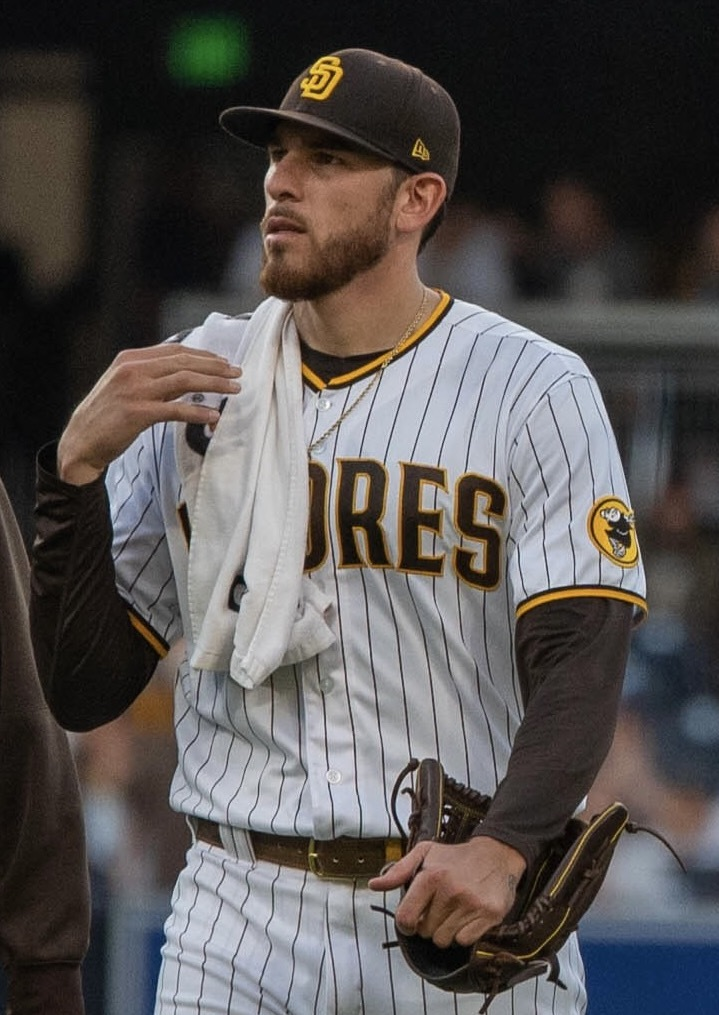
- Musgrove with the San Diego Padres in 2021

San Diego Padres – No. 44
- Pitcher
- Born: December 4, 1992 (age 33); El Cajon, California, U.S.
- Bats: Right Throws: Right

MLB debut
- August 2, 2016, for the Houston Astros

MLB statistics (through 2024 season)
- Win–loss record: 66–62
- Earned run average: 3.73
- Strikeouts: 1,050
- Stats at Baseball Reference

Teams
- Houston Astros (2016–2017); Pittsburgh Pirates (2018–2020); San Diego Padres (2021–2024, 2026–present)

Career highlights and awards
- All-Star (2022); World Series champion (2017); Pitched a no-hitter on April 9, 2021

Joseph Anthony Musgrove (born December 4, 1992) is an American professional baseball pitcher for the San Diego Padres of Major League Baseball (MLB). He previously played in MLB for the Houston Astros and Pittsburgh Pirates.

Musgrove was born in El Cajon, California, and began participating in baseball tournaments at the age of seven. He broke out as a star pitcher and batter during his junior season at Grossmont High School, which he helped take to two state championship appearances. After being selected by the Toronto Blue Jays in the first round of the 2011 MLB draft, Musgrove chose to forgo his previous commitment to play college baseball for San Diego State, instead signing with the team. Partway through the 2012 season, Musgrove was traded to the Astros as part of a massive ten-player swap. There, his minor league career faltered due to a series of injuries, and he did not advance past the Rookie League until 2014. He began to rise through the Astros' farm system in 2015 and made his major league debut the following year.

In 2017, Musgrove was part of the World Series-winning Astros team. That offseason, Musgrove was part of another massive trade between the Astros and the Pirates. He spent three years there before being traded to his hometown Padres. On April 9, 2021, Musgrove pitched the first no-hitter in the Padres' 52-year franchise history.

== Early life ==
Musgrove was born on December 4, 1992, in El Cajon, California, to Mark and Diane Musgrove. He has one brother and two sisters. Mark, a lifelong baseball fan, originally supported the San Francisco Giants but became a San Diego Padres fan after the team was created in 1969. He was frequently busy, working as a police officer and private investigator in San Diego, California, so Diane played catch with a young Musgrove in their front yard. Musgrove began participating in baseball tournaments at the age of seven, where he was often physically larger than his teammates. Additionally, Musgrove took pitching lessons with distant relative Dominick Johnson, the son of Major League Baseball (MLB) player Deron Johnson. Johnson taught Musgrove a series of intense workouts designed in the 1970s by former Philadelphia Phillies trainer Gus Hoefling.

Musgrove attended Grossmont High School in El Cajon, where he emerged as a strong two-way player during his junior season, playing alongside future Pittsburgh Pirates teammate Steven Brault. As a pitcher in 2010, Musgrove boasted an 11–1 win–loss record with five saves, a 2.07 earned run average (ERA), and 70 strikeouts in 77 2/3 innings pitched. As a batter, he also had a .430 batting average, with nine home runs and 35 runs batted in (RBIs). The following year, his record fell to 7–5, but Musgrove recorded a 2.40 ERA and 100 strikeouts in 78 2/3 innings while hitting .350 with nine home runs and 32 RBIs.

== Professional career ==
=== Toronto Blue Jays (2011–2012) ===
==== Minor leagues ====
The Toronto Blue Jays selected Musgrove out of high school in the first round, 46th overall, of the 2011 MLB draft. At the time, he had committed to play college baseball for San Diego State but chose to forgo that commitment in order to sign with the Blue Jays. He played eight games with the Rookie Gulf Coast League Blue Jays before being moved to the other Rookie affiliate, the Bluefield Blue Jays, in late August. In a combined nine games and 24 2/3 innings for the two teams, Musgrove posted a 1–1 record in 2011, with a 4.01 ERA and 18 strikeouts. He began with Bluefield in 2012, recording a 1.13 ERA and nine strikeouts in eight innings.

=== Houston Astros (2012–2017) ===
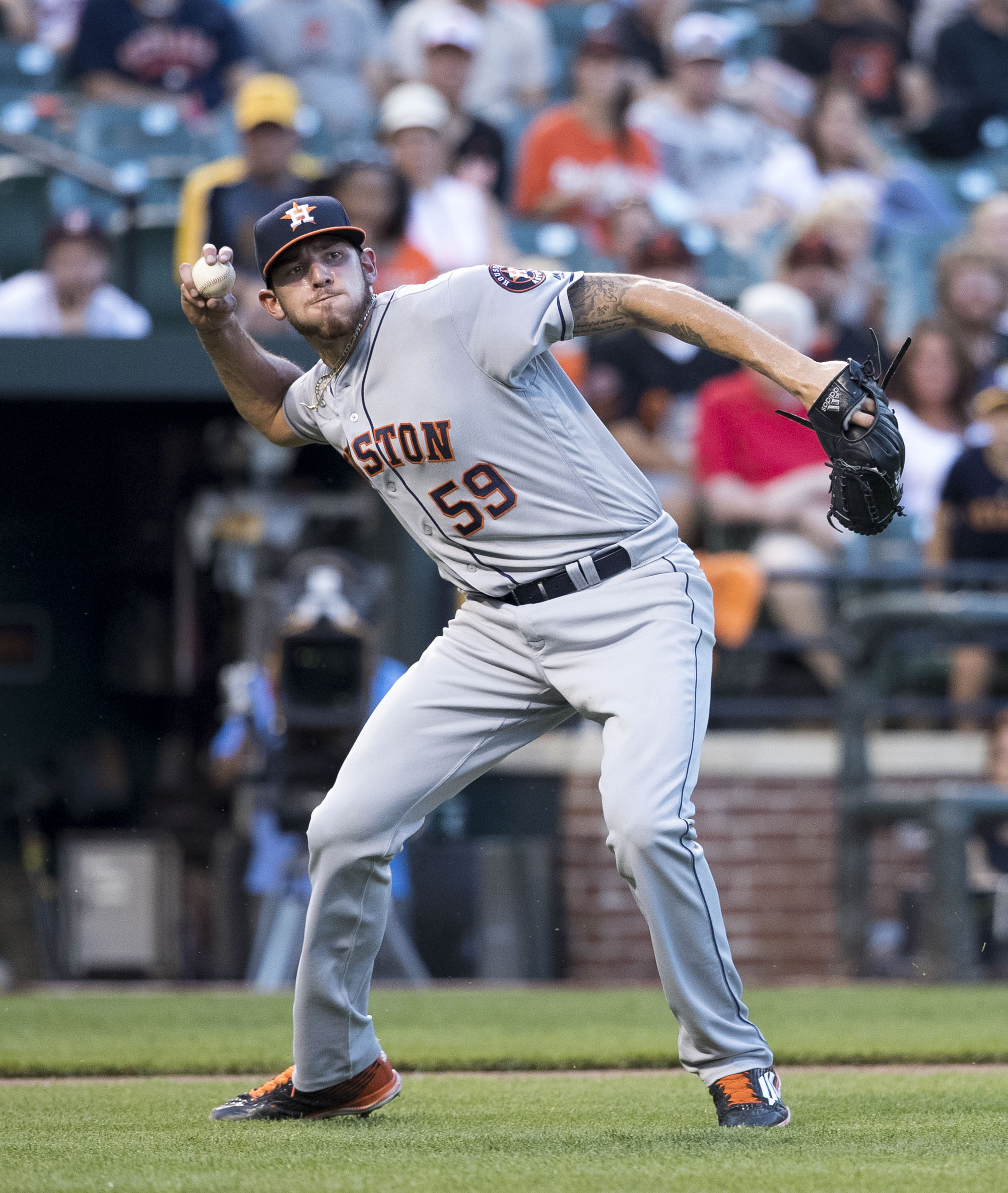
Musgrove with the Houston Astros in 2016

On July 20, 2012, Musgrove was part of a massive 10-player trade between the Blue Jays and the Houston Astros. He was traded to Houston alongside major league players Francisco Cordero and Ben Francisco, minor league prospects Asher Wojciechowski, David Rollins, and Carlos Pérez, and a player to be named later, in exchange for J. A. Happ, Brandon Lyon, and David Carpenter. The player to be named later was eventually named as pitching prospect Kevin Comer. Houston assigned Musgrove to the Greeneville Astros, where he went 0–1 with a 7.00 ERA in four games and nine innings. He spent the entirety of the 2013 season with the Gulf Coast League Astros, going 1–3 with a 4.41 ERA in 32 2/3 innings and 11 games.

A series of injuries throughout his minor league career kept Musgrove from breaking out of the Rookie Leagues until 2014, when he was assigned to the Low–A Tri-City ValleyCats. He missed two months of the 2012 season due to a strained rotator cuff, and spent the majority of the 2013 season on the sidelines with a sprained ulnar collateral ligament. An injury to his sternoclavicular joint continued to bother Musgrove during his time with the ValleyCats, and he made only a handful of appearances. In the 77 innings that he did pitch, Musgrove posted a 7–1 record with a 2.81 ERA and 67 strikeouts, as well as 0.96 walks plus hits per innings pitched (WHIP).

Musgrove started the 2015 season with the Single–A Quad Cities River Bandits, with whom he posted a 4–1 record and a 0.70 ERA in five games. He received two promotions that season: first, in May, to the High-A Lancaster JetHawks, and then again in June to the Double –A Corpus Christi Hooks. Musgrove went 12–1 for the season across all three teams, with a 1.88 ERA and 99 strikeouts in 100 2/3 innings. He was named the Astros' 2015 Minor League Pitcher of the Year and was added to the 40-man roster in November so that he could be protected from the Rule 5 draft.

After beginning 2016 with Corpus Christi, Musgrove was promoted to the Triple–A Fresno Grizzlies on May 13, 2016. After a strong start to his time in Fresno, recording a 2.00 ERA with 19 strikeouts by mid-July, Musgrove was selected as the starting pitcher for the United States Team at the 2016 All-Star Futures Game. He retired all three World Team batters he faced on only 11 pitches. Musgrove went 5–3 for the season in Fresno, with a 3.81 ERA and 57 strikeouts in 59 innings.

==== Major leagues ====
Musgrove was recalled by the Astros from Fresno on August 1, 2016. In 16 games between Corpus Christi and Fresno prior to his promotion, he was 7–4 with a 2.74 ERA. He made his major league debut on August 2 versus the Toronto Blue Jays, striking out eight over 4 1/3 innings while only allowing one hit. His first Major League strikeout victim was Edwin Encarnación. He spent the remainder of the season with the Astros, going 4–4 with a 4.06 ERA over 11 games (10 starts). Musgrove began 2017 with Houston and spent the majority of the season there, pitching only one game with Fresno. In 38 games (15 starts) for the Astros in 2017, he was 7–8 with a 4.77 ERA.

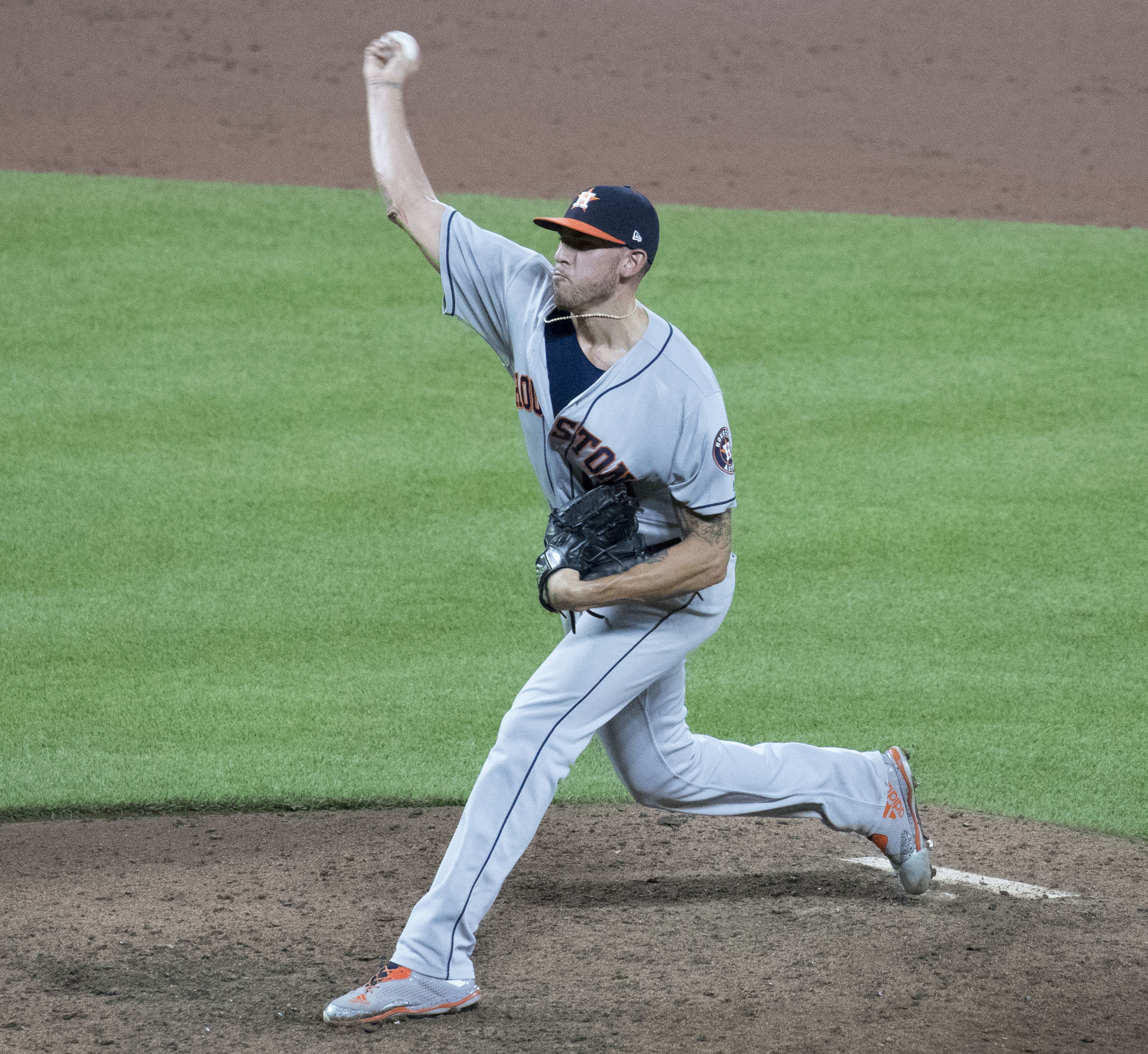
Musgrove delivers a pitch for the Astros in 2017

In the postseason, he appeared in seven games, including four World Series games. In four innings pitched, he allowed three hits and three runs and threw a scoreless top of the 10th inning of Game 5 against the Dodgers where he was the winning pitcher. The series concluded after 7 games with the Astros winning the title. Three years later, it was revealed in the Houston Astros sign stealing scandal that the Astros had cheated during the 2017 season. Musgrove subsequently said he thought the team's championship was "tainted" because of this.

=== Pittsburgh Pirates (2018–2020) ===
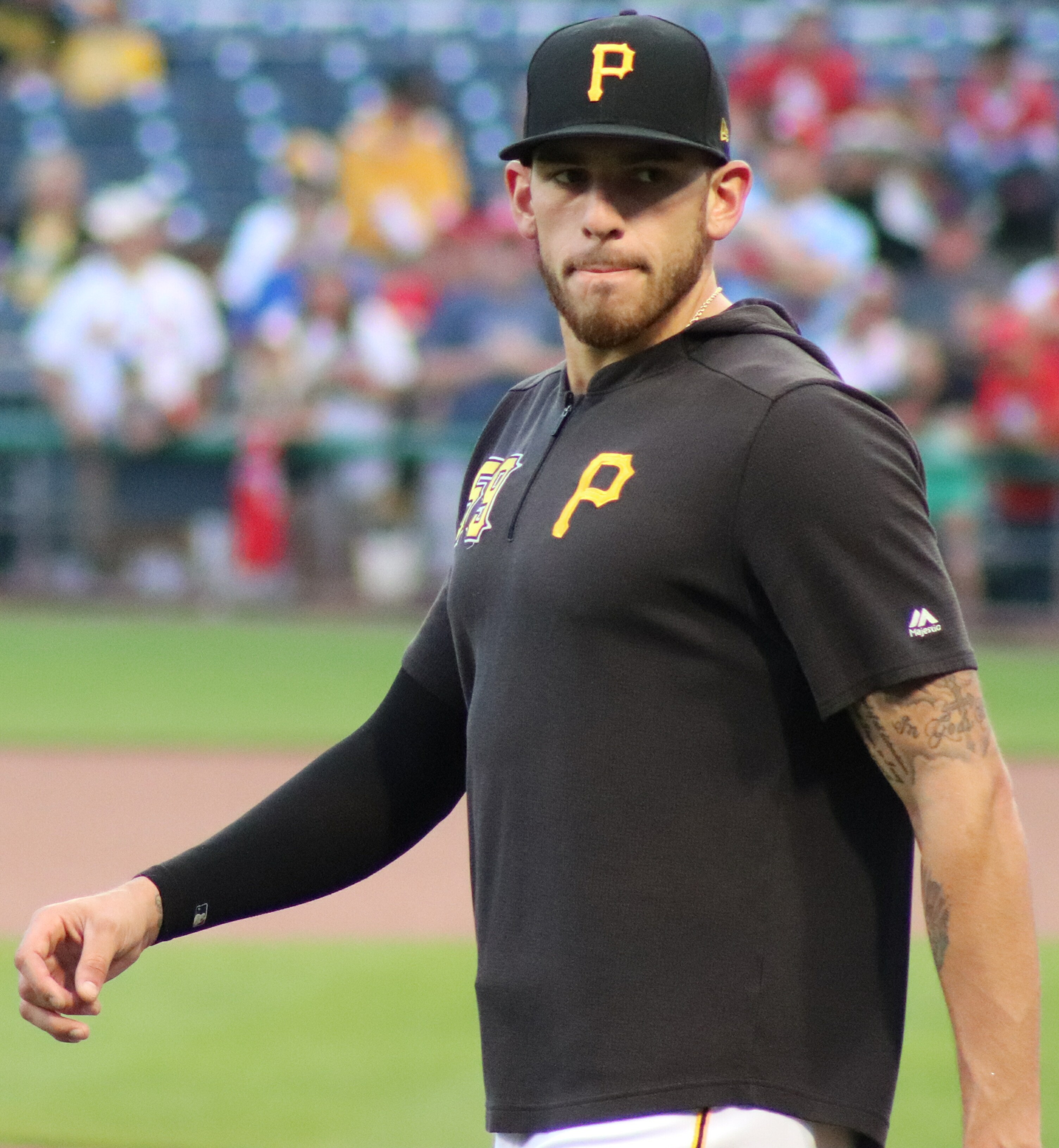
Musgrove with the Pirates in 2019

On January 13, 2018, the Astros traded Musgrove, along with Michael Feliz, Colin Moran and Jason Martin, to the Pittsburgh Pirates in exchange for Gerrit Cole. He began the season on the disabled list and was activated on May 25, joining the starting rotation. Pitching against the St. Louis Cardinals on August 30, 2018, Musgrove began the game by throwing 21 consecutive strikes, the most by a major league pitcher to start a game since 1988. This included eight swinging strikes, six called strikes, two foul balls and five balls in play where the batter was put out by the Pirates fielders. In 19 starts, he finished with a record of 6–9 in 115 1/3 innings. In 2019, his left-on-base percentage of 63.2% was the worst in the majors. In 2020 for the Pirates, Musgrove recorded a 1–5 record and 3.86 ERA with 55 strikeouts in 39 2/3 innings pitched.

=== San Diego Padres (2021–present) ===
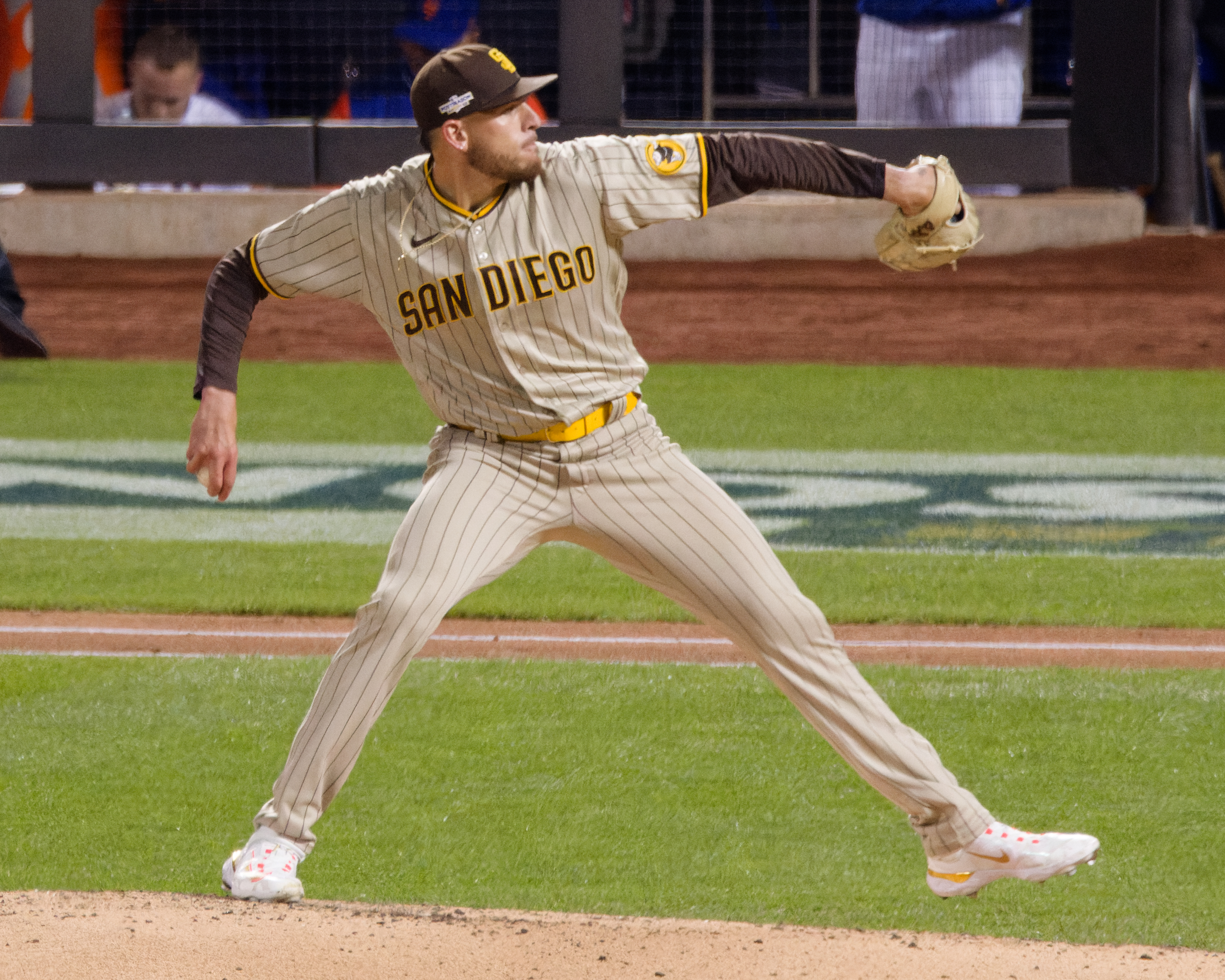
Musgrove pitching in Game 3 of the 2022 National League Wild Card Series

On January 19, 2021, the Pirates traded Musgrove to his hometown San Diego Padres in a three-team trade that sent David Bednar, Omar Cruz, Drake Fellows, Hudson Head, and Endy Rodríguez to the Pirates and Joey Lucchesi to the New York Mets.

The 2021 season proved to be a breakout campaign for Musgrove, as he posted career bests in several categories, including ERA, WHIP, batting average against, strikeouts, innings pitched, and win/loss record. On April 9, 2021, Musgrove threw a no-hitter against the Texas Rangers at Globe Life Field, the first no-hitter in the Padres' 52-year history (the Padres were the last of the 30 active MLB teams without a no-hitter at the time). He threw 77 of 112 pitches for strikes and struck out 10 batters; a fourth-inning hit by pitch to Joey Gallo prevented Musgrove from achieving a perfect game. In 2021, Musgrove posted an 11–9 record with a 3.18 ERA and 203 strikeouts in 181 1/3 innings. He led the Padres' starting rotation in wins, ERA, and strikeouts.

On August 1, 2022, the Padres announced that they had signed Musgrove to a five-year contract extension worth $100 million.

Musgrove followed up his 2021 campaign with a strong season in 2022, recording a career-best 2.93 ERA over 181 innings pitched, the lowest ERA among the Padres starting rotation that season. 21 of Musgrove's 30 starts in 2022 were quality starts, and Musgrove had the 9th-lowest ERA among qualified NL starting pitchers. Musgrove pitched the third game of the 2022 NL Wild Card Series against the New York Mets, holding the Mets scoreless over seven innings while allowing only two baserunners. Musgrove pitched the fourth game of the NLDS against the Los Angeles Dodgers and earned the win in the series-clinching game, holding the Dodgers to two runs over six innings despite allowing nine baserunners.

Musgrove made 17 starts for the Padres in 2023, registering a 10–3 record and 3.05 ERA with 97 strikeouts across 97 1/3 innings pitched. His season ended in late July, as a result of right shoulder capsule inflammation.

Musgrove began the 2024 campaign out of San Diego's rotation, compiling a 3–4 record and 5.66 ERA with 44 strikeouts across 10 starts. He was placed on the injured list with a bone spur in his pitching elbow on June 1, 2024, and was transferred to the 60–day injured list on June 28. Musgrove was activated on August 12. On October 2, Musgrove was pulled from a Wild Card series start against the Atlanta Braves in the fourth inning with what was initially reported as elbow tightness. Two days later, he was diagnosed with a torn UCL. He underwent Tommy John surgery and missed the entire 2025 season. On May 7, 2026, Musgrove was transferred to the 60-day injured list.

Musgrove was added to the Padres’ 2026 Wild Card roster ahead of their series with the Chicago Cubs. He pitched the 9th inning, striking out two to close out an 8-0 victory in Game 1.

== Personal life ==
On December 5, 2022, Musgrove became a world record holder after throwing an 86-mph fastball in Antarctica. The feat became the fastest pitch thrown in the coldest continent on Earth and was done in support of the Challenged Athletes Foundation.

== See also ==
- List of Major League Baseball no-hitters

Awards and achievements
| Preceded by Alec Mills | No-hitter pitcher April 9, 2021 | Succeeded by Carlos Rodón |
