= Footing =

Footing may refer to:

- A part of a foundation, in architecture and civil engineering
- Footing (bookkeeping)
- Footing (sexual act)
- Jogging, a form of running

== See also ==
- Footer (disambiguation)
