= Drake Fellows =

American baseball player (born 1998)

Philadelphia Phillies
- Pitcher
- Born: March 6, 1998 (age 28); Lawrenceburg, Indiana, U.S.
- Bats: Left Throws: Right

Drake Robert Fellows (born March 6, 1998) is an American professional baseball pitcher in the Philadelphia Phillies organization.

== Career ==
Fellows attended Joliet Catholic Academy in Joliet, Illinois, and Vanderbilt University, where he played college baseball for the Vanderbilt Commodores, and won the 2019 College World Series in Omaha, NE.

=== Pittsburgh Pirates ===
Fellows was selected by the San Diego Padres in the sixth round (173rd overall) of the 2019 Major League Baseball draft. Fellows did not play in 2019 after being diagnosed with non-hodgkins lymphoma. He did not play in a game in 2020 due to the cancellation of the minor league season because of the COVID-19 pandemic.

On January 19, 2021, Fellows was traded to the Pittsburgh Pirates in a three team trade that also sent David Bednar, Omar Cruz, Hudson Head, and Endy Rodríguez to the Pirates, Joe Musgrove to the Padres, and Joey Lucchesi to the New York Mets. He made his professional debut with the rookie-level Florida Complex League Pirates and Single-A Bradenton Marauders, but pitched only 11 2/3 innings due to an elbow injury.

Fellows missed the entirety of the 2022 season while recovering from Tommy John surgery. He returned to action in 2023 with the FCL Pirates and Bradenton. In 11 appearances (five starts) for the two affiliates, Fellows accumulated an 0–1 record and 8.25 ERA with 13 strikeouts over 12 innings of work.

Fellows split the 2024 season between the High-A Greensboro Grasshoppers, Double-A Altoona Curve, and Triple-A Indianapolis Indians. In 24 appearances (13 starts) for the three affiliates, he compiled an aggregate 3–6 record and 5.67 ERA with 68 strikeouts across 74 2/3 innings pitched. Fellows returned to Indianapolis in 2025, pitching to a 9–6 record and 4.41 ERA with 94 strikeouts in 112 1/3 innings pitched across 33 games (19 starts). He elected free agency following the season on November 6, 2025.

=== Philadelphia Phillies ===
On December 12, 2025, Fellows signed a minor league contract with the New York Yankees organization. Fellows was released by the Yankees prior to the start of the regular season on March 22, 2026.

On May 21, 2026, Fellows signed a minor league contract with the Philadelphia Phillies.

== Personal life ==
After he was drafted in 2019, Fellows was diagnosed with non-Hodgkin lymphoma. He received treatment at the Lurie Cancer Center and went into remission in January 2020.
