= Heading =

Heading can refer to:

- Heading (metalworking), a process which incorporates the extruding and upsetting processes
- Heading (navigation), the direction a person or vehicle is facing, usually similar to its course
- Double-heading, the use of two locomotives at the front of a train
- Subject heading, an integral part of bibliographic control
- Headline, text at the top of a newspaper article
- Heading off, especially with regard to livestock, sports or military action, circling around to prevent livestock or opponents from fleeing. See New Zealand Heading Dog.
- Heading date, a parameter in barley cultivation
- Heading, part of a flag used to attach it to the halyard; see Flag § Hoisting the flag.

== See also ==
- Head (disambiguation)
- Header (disambiguation)
- Headed (disambiguation)
