= Joey Lucchesi =

American baseball player (born 1993)

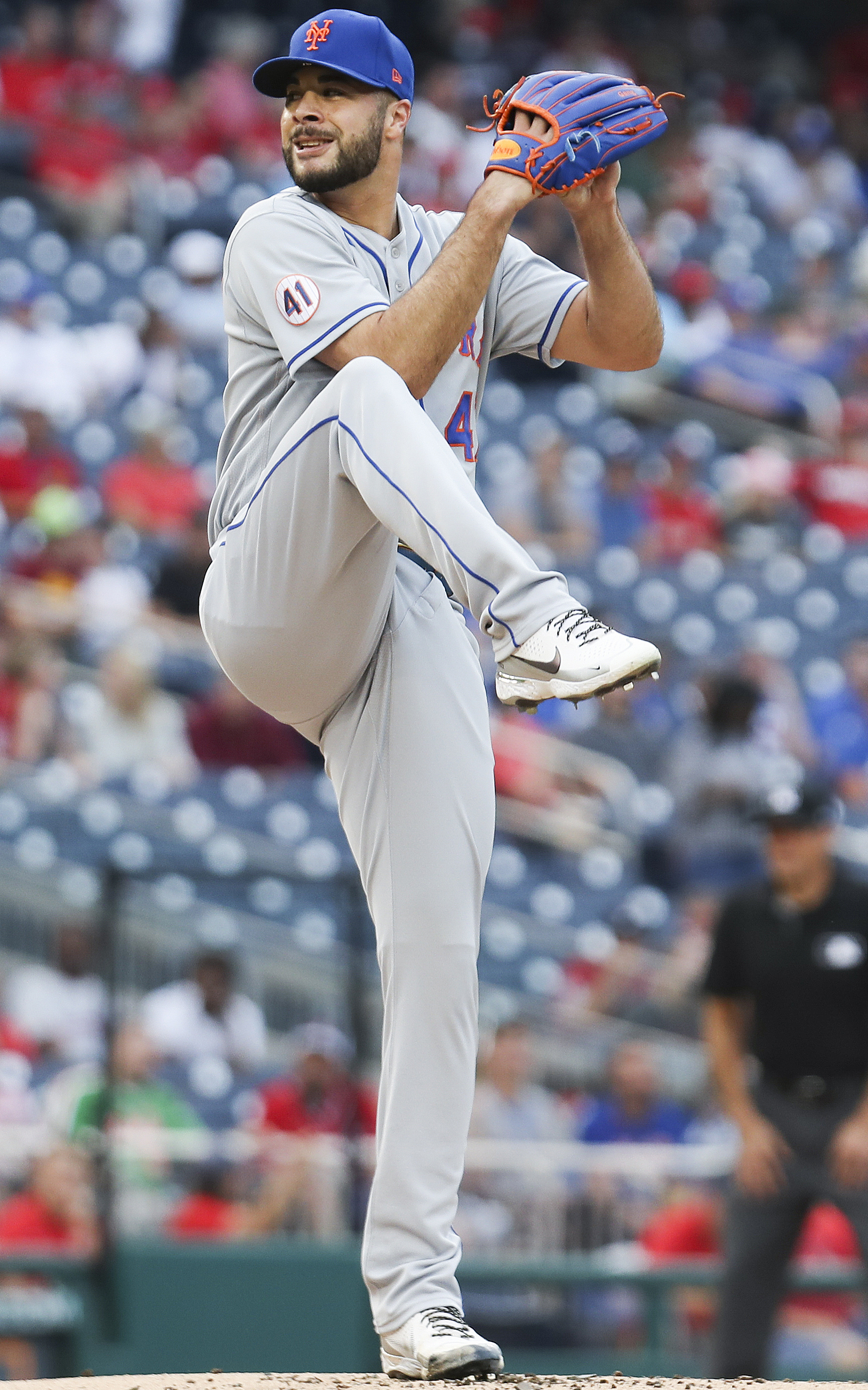
- Lucchesi with the New York Mets in 2021

Chiba Lotte Marines – No. 48
- Pitcher
- Born: June 6, 1993 (age 33); Newark, California, U.S.
- Bats: Left Throws: Left

MLB debut
- March 30, 2018, for the San Diego Padres
- NPB: August 9, 2026, for the Chiba Lotte Marines

MLB statistics (through April 28, 2026)
- Win–loss record: 23–28
- Earned run average: 4.15
- Strikeouts: 423

NPB statistics (through August 21, 2026)
- Win–loss record: 0-0
- Earned run average: 4.50
- Strikeouts: 4
- Stats at Baseball Reference

Teams
- San Diego Padres (2018–2020); New York Mets (2021, 2023–2024); San Francisco Giants (2025); Los Angeles Angels (2026); Chiba Lotte Marines (2026-present)

Joseph George Lucchesi (loo-kay-see; born June 6, 1993) is an American professional baseball pitcher for the Chiba Lotte Marines of Nippon Professional Baseball (NPB). He has previously played in Major League Baseball (MLB) for the San Diego Padres, New York Mets, San Francisco Giants, and Los Angeles Angels. He made his MLB debut in 2018.

== Career ==
=== Amateur career ===
Lucchesi attended Newark Memorial High School in Newark, California, and played college baseball at Chabot College and Southeast Missouri State University. He was named the Ohio Valley Conference Pitcher of the Year in 2015 and 2016, becoming the first pitcher in conference history to earn the award in back-to-back years. In 2016, his junior season, he had a 10–5 win–loss record with a 2.19 earned run average (ERA) in 17 games played (16 games started). His 242 career strikeouts set a Southeast Missouri State Record.

=== San Diego Padres ===
The San Diego Padres selected Lucchesi in the fourth round of the 2016 Major League Baseball draft. Lucchesi signed and made his professional debut with the Tri-City Dust Devils. On July 28, he combined with three other pitchers, to throw a one-hitter versus the Spokane Indians. He was promoted to the Fort Wayne TinCaps in September. In 15 total games between the two teams, he posted an 0–2 record and 1.29 ERA with 56 strikeouts in 42 innings. In 2017, Lucchesi played for both the Lake Elsinore Storm and the San Antonio Missions, pitching to a combined 11–7 record with a 2.20 ERA and 0.97 WHIP in 24 total games (23 starts) between both clubs.

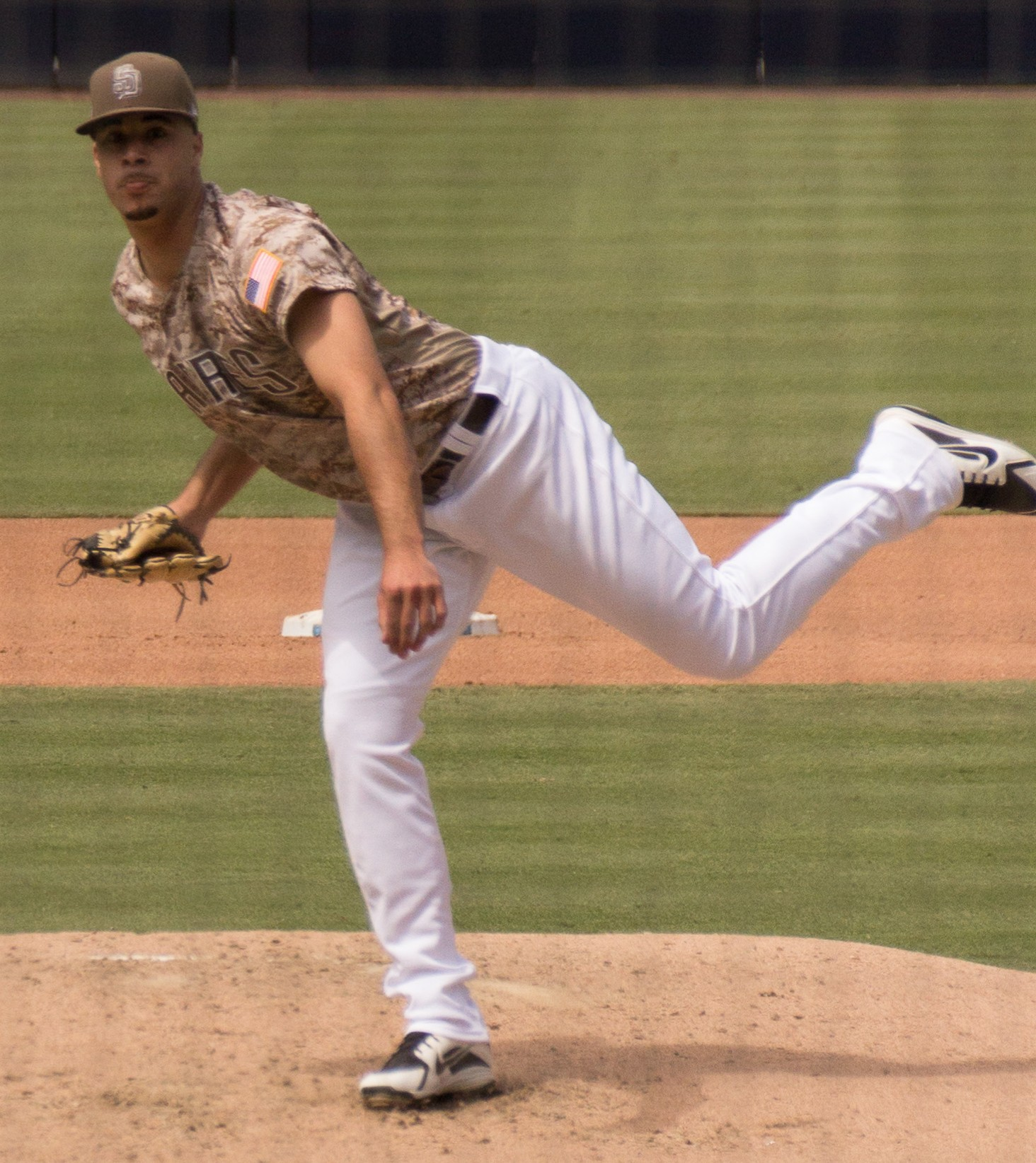
Lucchesi pitching for the San Diego Padres in 2018

Lucchesi made his major league debut on March 30, 2018, at Petco Park against the Milwaukee Brewers, making him the first pitcher from the 2016 draft to reach the major leagues and second player overall after Austin Hays. He started the game and pitched 4 2/3 innings, giving up three earned runs on seven hits along with striking out one; he did not receive a decision as the Brewers defeated the Padres 8–6. Lucchesi missed a month on the disabled list with a right hip strain in late May and early June, but was otherwise a regular member of the Padres' rotation. He finished his 2018 rookie campaign pitching to an 8–9 record with a 4.08 ERA in 26 starts. He led the rotation with ten strikeouts per nine innings, but only averaged 5.0 innings per start.

In 2019, Lucchesi led the pitching staff in wins (10), innings (163 2/3), strikeouts (158) while finishing with an ERA of 4.18 in 30 starts. He allowed the lowest line drive percentage of all major league pitchers (17.0%). Lucchesi struggled during the 2020 season, pitching to a 0–1 record and a 7.94 ERA with five strikeouts in 5 2/3 innings.

=== New York Mets ===
On January 19, 2021, Lucchesi was traded to the New York Mets as part of a three-team trade that sent Joe Musgrove to the Padres and David Bednar, Omar Cruz, Drake Fellows, Hudson Head, and Endy Rodríguez to the Pittsburgh Pirates. On June 21, Lucchesi was diagnosed with a “significant” tear in his left elbow's ulnar collateral ligament. After being diagnosed with a complete tear of the ligament, it was announced that Lucchesi would undergo Tommy John surgery, ending his season. In 11 games in 2021, he had a 1–4 record and 4.46 ERA with 41 strikeouts in 38 1/3 innings pitched. Over his final five starts of the 2021 season, Lucchesi recorded a 1.19 ERA in 22 2/3 innings.

After missing the 2022 season recovering from Tommy John surgery, Lucchesi was optioned to the Triple-A Syracuse Mets to begin the 2023 season. After not pitching a game since June 18, 2021, Lucchesi started for the first time since his surgery during a game against the San Francisco Giants on April 21, 2023. In his outing, he lasted seven full innings, with only 4 hits, 2 walks and striking out 9 batters, defeating the Giants 7–0. He made 9 starts for the Mets, logging a 4–0 record and 2.89 ERA with 32 strikeouts across 46 2/3 innings pitched.

Lucchesi was optioned to Triple–A Syracuse to begin the 2024 season. He was recalled to the Mets to start a game against the Phillies on May 15, in which he allowed five earned runs and earned the loss. After the Mets traded for Phil Maton, Lucchesi was designated for assignment by New York, on July 9, 2024. He cleared waivers and was sent outright to Syracuse on July 14. He was recalled to the majors on September 30, to start the Mets' last game of the regular season, and threw 113 pitches against the Braves over six innings, giving up one run, in a Braves 3–0 victory. On November 4, Lucchesi was removed from the 40-man roster. He rejected an outright assignment and elected free agency.

=== San Francisco Giants ===
On January 20, 2025, Lucchesi signed a minor league contract with the San Francisco Giants. On June 15, Lucchesi was called up to the major league club. Lucchesi pitched just 2/3 of an inning that day with no strikeouts while allowing three hits and two runs against the Los Angeles Dodgers. He made a career-high 38 appearances for San Francisco, posting an 0–1 record and 3.76 ERA with 31 strikeouts across 38 1/3 innings pitched. On November 21, Lucchesi was non-tendered by the Giants and became a free agent.

On March 9, 2026, Lucchesi re-signed with the Giants on a minor league contract. He was released by San Francisco prior to the start of the regular season on March 22.

=== Los Angeles Angels ===
On March 24, 2026, Lucchesi signed a one-year, major league contract with the Los Angeles Angels. He made three appearances for Los Angeles, but struggled to a 7.71 ERA with two strikeouts across 2 1/3 innings pitched. On April 5, Lucchesi was designated for assignment by the Angels. He elected free agency two days later after clearing waivers. On April 9, Lucchesi re-signed with the on a minor league contract. On April 26, the Angels added him back to their active roster. After continued struggles over two additional outings, Lucchesi was designated for assignment by Los Angeles on April 29. He cleared waivers and elected free agency on May 1. Lucchesi re-signed with the Angels on a minor league contract on May 5. On June 2, he was released by the Angels. Lucchesi re-signed with the team on a new minor league contract the next day. He was released by the Angels again on July 2.

=== Chiba Lotte Marines ===
On July 17, 2026, Lucchesi signed with the Chiba Lotte Marines of Nippon Professional Baseball; manager Saburo Omura subsequently announced that Lucchesi would be pitching out of the team's rotation.

== Personal life ==
Lucchesi grew up a fan of the Oakland Athletics. He got his nickname, Fuego, when a Southeast Missouri State teammate suggested it while Lucchesi was trying to create a Twitter handle.

In 2021, Lucchesi was inducted into the Southeast Missouri State Hall of Fame.

Lucchesi and his girlfriend, Jenifer, welcomed a daughter on December 10, 2024.
