= The Good Life (Railroad Earth album) =

Studio album by Railroad Earth
- Released: June 8, 2004
- Genre: Bluegrass; Jam band
- Label: Sugar Hill
- Producer: Railroad Earth; Stewart Lerman

Railroad Earth chronology
Bird in a House (2002)	The Good Life (2004)	Elko (2006)

Professional ratings
Review scores
Source	Rating
AllMusic	link

The Good Life is the third studio album by the bluegrass/jam band Railroad Earth, released on June 8, 2004.

So many jam bands seem to forget the importance of good song writing with meaningful lyrics. Railroad Earth's songs are well-crafted stories, and are delivered with outstanding musicianship and strong vocals. The musical duties are distributed in pretty much the same way here as on their previous two releases: Todd Sheaffer handles vocals and guitar and does the bulk of the songwriting; John Skehan, Tim Carbone, and Andy Goessling provide the band's trademark swirling-and-skirling texture; new bassist Johnny Grubb (replacing Dave Von Dollen) and percussionist Carey Harmon provide the solid ground they take off from and land on. Multi-instrumentalist Andy Goessling is credited on banjo, dobro, and sax (to name a few), Tim Carbone on fiddle, accordion, piano and electric guitar, and John Skehan on mandolin, piano, and Hammond organ.

Shaeffer often writes tunes about love, being positive, and living a simpler life paired with catchy refrains and memorable melodies, and this effort is not different in that regard. Re-occurring themes of examining one's destiny, living a good life, and staying true to one's self resound. The opening track, "Storms" uses the metaphor to "ride out the storm" in a relationship and stick together through hard times. Perhaps an ode to marriage? "Way of the Buffalo" is an environmental allegory and the title track, "The Good Life," is about living free and "going back to the country" evoking images of a simpler time. One of the strongest songs is "Goat" which in the live setting extends into a long jammed out vehicle for the band. The somber lyrics, however, paint a picture of how to rid one's life of negativity.

== Track listing ==
1. "Storms" (Sheaffer) - 4:54
2. "Bread and Water" (Railroad Earth, Sheaffer) - 4:24
3. "Mourning Flies" (Railroad Earth, Sheaffer) - 5:47
4. "Long Way to Go" (Sheaffer) - 4:30
5. "The Good Life" (Sheaffer) - 5:18
6. "In the Basement" (Sheaffer, Skehan) - 5:09
7. "Water Fountain Quicksand" (Skehan) - 2:55
8. "Goat" (Sheaffer) - 4:50
9. "Said What You Mean" (Sheaffer) - 6:32
10. "Way of the Buffalo" (Sheaffer) - 4:19
11. "'Neath the Stars" (Sheaffer) - 4:10
12. "(Untitled)" - 5:21

== Personnel ==
=== Musical ===
- Tim Carbone – accordion, backing vocals, electric guitar, harmonica, harmonium, piano, toy piano, viola, violin
- Andy Goessling – banjo, Dobro, guitar, mandolin, twelve-string guitar, ukulele
- Johnny Grubb – bass
- Carey Harmon – backing vocals, drums, percussion
- Todd Sheaffer – acoustic guitar, resonator guitar, vocals
- John Skehan – bouzouki, Hammond B3 organ, mandolin, piano

=== Technical ===
- Stewart Lerman – producer
- Kamal Patel – cover art
- Railroad Earth – producer
