= The Black Bear Sessions =

2001 debut, studio album by Railroad Earth

Studio album by Railroad Earth
- Released: 2001
- Recorded: Feb 12–Apr 6, 2001
- Genre: Bluegrass; Jam band
- Length: 47:22
- Label: Bos Music
- Producer: Railroad Earth

Railroad Earth chronology
The Black Bear Sessions (2001)	Bird in a House (2002)

Professional ratings
Review scores
Source	Rating
Allmusic	link

The Black Bear Sessions is the debut studio album by the bluegrass/jam band Railroad Earth, released in 2001.

== Track listing ==
1. "Head" (Sheaffer) – 6:59
2. "Lordy Lordy" (Sheaffer) – 4:12
3. "Seven Story Mountain" (Sheaffer) – 6:02
4. "Chains" (Sheaffer) – 4:29
5. "Black Bear" (Sheaffer) – 9:13
6. "Colorado" (Goessling, Sheaffer) – 5:11
7. "Real Love" (Sheaffer) – 3:48
8. "Stillwater Getaway" (Goessling, Skehan) – 5:50
9. "Cold Water" (Tom Waits, Kathleen Brennan) – 3:52
10. "Railroad Earth" (Sheaffer) – 5:26

== Personnel ==
- Tim Carbone – violin, harmonium, vocals, engineer
- David Coulter – photography
- Andy Goessling – guitar (acoustic), banjo, dobro, vocals, hi string guitar
- Carey Harmon – percussion, drums, vocals
- Gene Paul – mastering
- Railroad Earth – producer
- Brian Ross – executive producer
- Todd Sheaffer – guitar (acoustic), harmonica, vocals
- John Skehan – mandolin, vocals, photography
- Don Sternecker – engineer
- Dave Von Dollen – bass (upright)
