= Hudson Head =

American baseball player (born 2004)

Kansas City Monarchs – No. 10
- Outfielder
- Born: April 8, 2001 (age 25); San Antonio, Texas, U.S.
- Bats: Left Throws: Left

John Hudson Head (born April 8, 2001) is an American professional baseball outfielder for the Kansas City Monarchs of the American Association of Professional Baseball.

== Amateur career ==
Head attended Winston Churchill High School in San Antonio, Texas. As a senior in 2019, he batted .615 with 14 home runs. He committed to play college baseball for the Oklahoma Sooners. He was selected by the San Diego Padres in the third round of the 2019 Major League Baseball draft. He signed with the Padres for a $3 million signing bonus, a record for a player taken in the third round.

== Professional career ==
=== San Diego Padres ===
Head made his professional debut with the Rookie-level Arizona League Padres, batting .283 with one home run and seven doubles over 32 games. He did not play a minor league game in 2020 since the season was cancelled due to the COVID-19 pandemic.

=== Pittsburgh Pirates ===
On January 19, 2021, Head was traded to the Pittsburgh Pirates as part of a three team trade that also sent David Bednar, Omar Cruz, Drake Fellows and Endy Rodríguez to the Pirates, Joe Musgrove to the Padres and Joey Lucchesi to the New York Mets. He spent the 2021 season with the Bradenton Marauders of the Low-A Southeast, slashing .213/.362/.394 with 15 home runs, fifty RBI, and 16 doubles over 101 games.

Head made 106 appearances for the High-A Greensboro Grasshoppers in 2022, slashing .234/.343/.387 with 10 home runs, 40 RBI, and 13 stolen bases. He split the 2023 campaign between the rookie-level Florida Complex League Pirates and Greensboro, batting a combined .249/.318/.405 with five home runs, 23 RBI, and four stolen bases.

Head returned to Greensboro for the 2024 season, playing in 102 games and hitting .208/.303/.383 with 13 home runs, 49 RBI, and nine stolen bases. He began the 2025 season with the Double-A Altoona Curve, batting .116/.183/.174 with one home run, four RBI, and one stolen base. Head was released by the Pirates organization on July 26, 2025.

=== Kansas City Monarchs ===
On December 18, 2025, Head signed with the Kansas City Monarchs of the American Association of Professional Baseball.
