= Footer =

Footer may refer to:

- Football, especially association football (soccer) or rugby
- Page footer, in word processing, the bottom portion of a page
- Website footer, the bottom section of a website
- The unit of measure of difficulty of a particular song in the video game Dance Dance Revolution. ex. 'Can't Stop Fallin' in Love on Heavy' is a 9 footer
- Trailer (computing), supplemental data placed at the end of a block of data being stored or transmitted, which may contain information for the handling of the data block, or just mark its end.

== See also ==
- Footing
- Footnote
