= Bird in a House =

Studio album by Railroad Earth
- Released: 2002
- Genre: Bluegrass; Jam band
- Length: 66:14
- Label: Sugar Hill
- Producer: Railroad Earth

Railroad Earth chronology
The Black Bear Sessions (2001)	Bird in a House (2002)	The Good Life (2004)

Professional ratings
Review scores
Source	Rating
Allmusic	4.5/5 stars

Bird in a House is the second studio album by the bluegrass/jam band Railroad Earth, released in 2002.

== Track listing ==
1. "Drag Him Down" (Sheaffer) - 4:19
2. "Bird in a House" (Sheaffer) - 5:28
3. "Like a Buddha" (Carbone, Sheaffer, Von Dollen) - 7:05
4. "Pack a Day" (Skehan) - 3:09
5. "Mountain Time" (Sheaffer) - 7:02
6. "Give That Boy a Hand" (Goessling, Sheaffer) - 4:19
7. "Peace on Earth" (Carbone, Von Dollen) - 4:30
8. "Walk on By" (Sheaffer) - 5:57
9. "Mighty River" (Sheaffer, Skehan) - 5:28
10. "Lois Ann" (Goessling, Sheaffer, Skehan) - 3:47
11. "Came Up Smilin'" (Sheaffer) - 5:53
12. "Dandelion Wine" (Casal) - 4:38
13. "Saddle of the Sun" (Sheaffer) - 4:39

== Personnel ==
- Tim Carbone - piano, violin, vocals
- Buck Dilly - pedal steel
- Andy Goessling - banjo, clarinet, dobro, flute, guitar, ukulele, penny whistle, vox organ, marxophone
- Carey Harmon - percussion, cymbals, drums, vocals, drums (snare)
- Fred Kevorkian - mastering
- Railroad Earth - arranger, producer
- Todd Sheaffer - guitar, trumpet, vocals
- John Siket - mixing
- John Skehan - mandolin, piano, tuba
- Don Sternecker - engineer, mixing
- Dave Von Dollen - bass, trombone (valve), vocals, kalimba
