= Lillian Brown Head =

American fashion designer

Lillian Brown Head (1921 - 2010) was an African American fashion designer who was known for her bold designs and high fashion hats. In Atlanta, Georgia, Head designed hats for many prominent citizens including Mrs. Ivan Allen Jr. She was most famous for her themed fashion including a set of designs in honor of the Hyatt Regency opening in downtown Atlanta. This included a hat that matched the design of the newly opened Polaris lounge, a coat that was inspired by the Hyatt design and a handbag modeled after the elevators.

Her work is in the collection of the National Museum of African American History in Washington., DC.

== Early life and education ==
Head was raised in Buford, Georgia. She was the fourth of five children. Head graduated from high school in 1939 and enrolled in a correspondence course at the Louie Miller school of Millinery in Chicago. In 1946, she graduated from the correspondence course. She was initially rejected as a designer being told "white girls do that". She had hoped to be employed at Loretta Bonta’s chic Atlanta artist workshop, but was hired instead as Ms. Bonta's domestic help.

== Career ==
After a few years Head's creative designs were recognized and she was hired as an official milliner. Her unique designs began to draw national attention, particularly from Mary McLeod Bethune, an important civil rights advocate. Bethune invited Head to design a show that lead to her designs being displayed in New York department stores next to her white counterparts. She also designed a hat worn by Mrs.Gladstone Lewis Chandler at her daughter's wedding, which was one of the first black weddings to take place at Atlanta's St. Luke's Episcopal Church.

== Death ==
Head died on August 7, 2010 at the age of 89 at Piedmont Hospital after a fall and a related illness.

== Legacy ==
Head's collection is available for viewing at the National Museum of African American History in Washington.
