= Elko (album) =

Live album by Railroad Earth
- Released: January 24, 2006
- Genre: Folk rock, Progressive Bluegrass, Bluegrass, Americana, Jam band
- Length: 2:05:50
- Label: Sugar Hill

Railroad Earth chronology
The Good Life (2004)	Elko (2006)	Amen Corner (2008)

Professional ratings
Review scores
Source	Rating
Allmusic	4/5 stars

Elko is a double live album by the American band Railroad Earth. It was released in 2006 by Sugar Hill Records. It is the band's first official live album, and fourth album overall. Elko showcases the band's improvisational live performance style, as noted by Allmusic: "The question of whether or not Railroad Earth can jam, if it was really in doubt, is swiftly answered on [this] 126-minute collection of 12 songs, five of which run over ten minutes each."

The album was recorded during the band's spring 2005 tour. It marks the first official release of "The Hunting Song," "Old Man and the Land," "Elko" and "Warhead Boogie," songs which had previously only been available on fan-traded live show audience recordings. With the success of Elko, Railroad Earth began releasing complete concert recordings in physical and digital formats following the model established by The Grateful Dead and Phish. The band also permits recordings done by live audio tapers to be made freely available on the Internet Archive.

== Track listing ==
Disc One

1. "Long Way to Go" (Sheaffer) - 6:20
2. "Colorado" (Goessling, Sheaffer) - 9:26
3. "Bird in a House" (Sheaffer) - 7:22
4. "The Hunting Song" (Fitzsimmons, Rymer, Sheaffer) - 11:56
5. "Old Man and the Land" (Calabrese, Sheaffer) - 6:57
6. "Head" (Sheaffer) - 15:41

Disc Two

1. "Elko" (Sheaffer) - 8:59
2. "Mighty River" (Sheaffer, Skehan) - 7:54
3. "Like a Buddha" (Carbone, Sheaffer, VonDollen) - 16:00
4. "Warhead Boogie" (Sheaffer) - 15:05
5. "Railroad Earth" (Sheaffer) - 6:00
6. "Seven Story Mountain" (Sheaffer) - 14:10

Note: the limited edition Japan release of Elko includes the bonus track "Luxury Liner" on Disc One.

== Personnel ==
Railroad Earth

- Tim Carbone - violin, vocals
- Andy Goessling - banjo, dobro, flute, guitar, mandolin, vocals, tin whistle
- Johnny Grubb - bass, vocals
- Carey Harmon - drums, vocals
- Todd Sheaffer - guitar, vocals
- John Skehan - mandolin, vocals

Production

- Package and layout design - Mark Berger
- Mastered by - Fred Kevorkian
- Mixed by - John Skehan, Johnny Grubb, Todd Sheaffer
- Recorded by - Johnny Grubb, Mike Partridge
