= The Head (band) =

Indie rock band from Atlanta, Georgia, US

The Head is an indie rock band from Atlanta, Georgia. It consists of three members: guitarist Jacob Morrell, drummer Jack Shaw, and bassist/vocalist Mike Shaw.

== History ==
When they were growing up, Jack and Mike Shaw, who are twin brothers, often listened to music together, including The Beatles, The Stone Roses, Mazzy Star, and Elliott Smith. The Shaw brothers started playing music with each other when they were 9, and formed the Head with their friend Morell in 2007, when all three members were 14 years old and went to the same high school (specifically, Holy Spirit Preparatory School). The band released their debut album, Puckered, in 2009. Their second album, Hang On, was released in 2011. Their third release, the Girls of the Yukon EP, was released in 2013; it represented their first experience recording songs while playing live together in studio. They played in a production of One Man, Two Guvnors by Georgia Shakespeare in July 2014. They released another EP, Millipedes, in November 2015.

== Reception ==
In Spin, Jon Young described Hang On as "charming and shiny" and said that the Head "have mastered the beloved science of catchy, toe-tapping melodies plus rich vocal harmonies". Creative Loafing's Bobby Moore reviewed "Millipedes", saying that on the EP, the band "demonstrate[s] pop knowledge and mastery beyond their years" and giving it three out of five stars.
