= William K. Head =

American football coach and college athletics administrator

Biographical details
- Born: November 15, 1947 (age 78)

Coaching career (HC unless noted)

Football
- 1981–1984: Fayetteville State
- 1985–1986: Kentucky State (assistant)
- 1987–1989: Kentucky State

Baseball
- 2012: Lane

Administrative career (AD unless noted)
- 1986–?: Kentucky State
- 1999–2001: Alabama State (interim AD)
- 2006–2009: Fisk
- ?: Kentucky State

Head coaching record
- Overall: 18–50–3 (football); 2–34 (baseball)

William K. Head (born November 15, 1947) is an American former football coach and college athletics administrator. He served as head football coach at Fayetteville State University from 1981 to 1984 and at Kentucky State University from 1987 until 1989, compiling a career college football record of 18–50–3. Head was hired in 1985 as head track and cross country coach and assistant football coach at Kentucky State. In May 1986 he was appointed as the school's athletic director.

== Head coaching record ==
=== Football ===
Year	Team	Overall	Conference	Standing	Bowl/playoffs
Fayetteville State Broncos (Central Intercollegiate Athletic Association) (1981–1984)
1981	Fayetteville State	3–6	2–5	T–4th (Southern)	
1982	Fayetteville State	2–8	2–5	T–4th (Southern)	
1983	Fayetteville State	1–8–1	1–5–1	5th (Southern)	
1984	Fayetteville State	4–4–1	3–3–1	3rd (Southern)	
Fayetteville State:		10–26–2	8–18–2		
Kentucky State Thorobreds (NCAA Division II independent) (1987–1989)
1987	Kentucky State	2–8–1			
1988	Kentucky State	4–7			
1989	Kentucky State	2–9			
Kentucky State:		8–24–1			
Total:		18–50–3			
