= List of Evansville Purple Aces baseball seasons =

This is a list of seasons completed by the Evansville Purple Aces baseball team of the National Collegiate Athletic Association (NCAA) Division I. Since the team's creation in 1924, the Purple Aces have participated in over 3,000 officially sanctioned games.

Evansville began competing as an Independent from 1924 to 1926 and again from 1946 to 1950. In 1951, the Purple Aces started to compete in the Indiana Collegiate Conference (ICC) before becoming Independent again for the 1979 and 1980 seasons. In 1981, the Aces joined the Midwestern City Conference (MCC) and continued to play in the conference before joining the Missouri Valley Conference (MVC) in 1995, of which they have been a member since.

== Seasons ==
Statistics overview
Season	Coach	Overall	Conference	Standing	Postseason
John Harmon (Independent) (1924–1926)
1924	John Harmon	3–7			
1925	John Harmon	5–1			
1926	John Harmon	4–10			
1927–1945	No team				
Emerson Henke (Independent) (1946–1946)
1946	Emerson Henke	0–5			
Don Ping (Independent) (1947–1950)
1947	Don Ping	3–4			
1948	Don Ping	7–4–1			
1949	Don Ping	5–6–1			
1950	Don Ping	6–5			
Don Ping (Indiana Collegiate Conference) (1951–1966)
1951	Don Ping	7–4–1		1st	
1952	Don Ping	6–5			
1953	Don Ping	6–4			
1954	Don Ping	3–7			
1954	Don Ping	3–7			
1955	Don Ping	5–5			
1956	Don Ping	12–3–1			
1957	Don Ping	8–6–1			
1958	Don Ping	5–7			
1959	Don Ping	1–4			
1960	Don Ping	0–6			
1961	Don Ping	1–7			
1962	Don Ping	5–5–1			
1963	Don Ping	3–8			
1964	Don Ping	2–11			
1965	Don Ping	4–6			
1966	Don Ping	4–7			
Dave Daviess (Indiana Collegiate Conference) (1967–1969)
1967	Dave Daviess	3–8			
1968	Dave Daviess	4–9			
1969	Dave Daviess	9–7–1			
Wayne Boultinghouse (Indiana Collegiate Conference) (1970–1974)
1970	Wayne Boultinghouse	7–7			
1971	Wayne Boultinghouse	3–12			
1972	Wayne Boultinghouse	14–15–2			
1973	Wayne Boultinghouse	21–11–1			
1974	Wayne Boultinghouse	35–21			
Bob Hodges (Indiana Collegiate Conference) (1975–1976)
1975	Bob Hodges	17–14	10–2	1st	NCAA Division II Mideast Regional
1976	Bob Hodges	21–16	10–2	1st	NCAA Division II Mideast Regional
Mike Platt (Indiana Collegiate Conference) (1977–1978)
1977	Mike Platt	13–29	6–5	T–2nd	
1978	Mike Platt	22–18	6–5	3rd	
Gary Crum (Independent) (1979)
1979	Gary Crum	4–27			
Jim Brownlee (Independent) (1980)
1980	Jim Brownlee	7–37–1			
Jim Brownlee (Midwestern City / Midwestern Collegiate Conference) (1981–1994)
1981	Jim Brownlee	26–24	3–5	2nd (South)	
1982	Jim Brownlee	21–41	0–8	3rd (South)	
1983	Jim Brownlee	25–20–1	2–6	3rd (South)	
1984	Jim Brownlee	33–28–1	7–5	3rd (South)	
1985	Jim Brownlee	38–26	7–5	2nd (South)	MCC Tournament
1986	Jim Brownlee	24–30	4–2	2nd (South)	MCC Tournament
1987	Jim Brownlee	29–30	4–4	2nd (South)	MCC Tournament
1988	Jim Brownlee	44–20	11–1	1st (South)	NCAA Division I Tempe Regional
1989	Jim Brownlee	36–26	12–3	1st (South)	MCC Tournament
1990	Jim Brownlee	27–25	11–3	1st (South)	MCC Tournament
1991	Jim Brownlee	40–18–1	19–5	1st	MCC Tournament
1992	Jim Brownlee	32–28	14–5	2nd	MCC Tournament
1993	Jim Brownlee	43–18	19–8	2nd	MCC Tournament
1994	Jim Brownlee	31–28	10–8	3rd	MCC Tournament
Jim Brownlee (Missouri Valley Conference) (1995–2002)
1995	Jim Brownlee	32–25	18–13	T–3rd	MVC Tournament
1996	Jim Brownlee	31–24	14–13	4th	MVC Tournament
1997	Jim Brownlee	29–30	13–19	5th	MVC Tournament
1998	Jim Brownlee	28–30	13–18	4th	MVC Tournament
1999	Jim Brownlee	32–25	17–13	4th	MVC Tournament
2000	Jim Brownlee	41–22	19–12	2nd	NCAA Division I Tallahassee Regional
2001	Jim Brownlee	35–21	17–11	T–3rd	MVC Tournament
2002	Jim Brownlee	22–33	12–20	8th	
Dave Schrage (Missouri Valley Conference) (2003–2006)
2003	Dave Schrage	24–31	12–20	9th	
2004	Dave Schrage	28–32	12–20	T–5th	MVC Tournament
2005	Dave Schrage	35–23	12–12	4th	MVC Tournament
2006	Dave Schrage	43–22	16–8	1st	NCAA Division I Charlottesville Regional
David Seifert (Missouri Valley Conference) (2007–2008)
2007	David Seifert	35–23	13–11	T–3rd	MVC Tournament
2008	David Seifert	14–42	4–20	9th	
Wes Carroll (Missouri Valley Conference) (2009–present)
2009	Wes Carroll	25–30	7–17	8th	
2010	Wes Carroll	32–27	10–11	5th	MVC Tournament
2011	Wes Carroll	28–25	7–13	7th	MVC Tournament
2012	Wes Carroll	32–27	10–11	4th	MVC Tournament
2013	Wes Carroll	24–34	10–10	4th	MVC Tournament
2014	Wes Carroll	34–21	15–6	1st	MVC Tournament
2015	Wes Carroll	29–24	8–13	6th	MVC Tournament
2016	Wes Carroll	29–27	9–12	5th	MVC Tournament
2017	Wes Carroll	18–39	8–12	6th	MVC Tournament
2018	Wes Carroll	12–39	3–18	8th	MVC Tournament
2019	Wes Carroll	24–29	11–10	T–4th	MVC Tournament
2020	Wes Carroll	5–11	0–0		Season canceled due to COVID-19
2021	Wes Carroll	28–27	11–16	7th	MVC Tournament
2022	Wes Carroll	32–24	14–6	2nd	MVC Tournament
2023	Wes Carroll	37–24	15–12	T–3rd	MVC Tournament
2024	Wes Carroll	39–26	17–10	T–2nd	NCAA Division I Knoxville Super Regional
2025	Wes Carroll	0–0	0–0		
Total:		1,565–1,508–13			
National champions College World Series participants Conference regular-season champion Conference regular-season and conference tournament champion Division regular-season champion Division regular-season and conference tournament champion Conference tournament champion
