= Wes Carroll (baseball) =

American baseball player and coach

Current position
- Title: Head coach
- Team: Evansville
- Conference: Missouri Valley
- Record: 445–471

Biographical details
- Born: January 5, 1979 (age 47); Evansville, Indiana, U.S.

Playing career
- 1998–2001: Evansville
- 2001: Batavia Muckdogs
- 2001–2002: Lakewood BlueClaws
- 2001–2002: Clearwater Phillies
- 2003–2004: Harrisburg Senators
- 2003–2004: Brevard County Manatees
- 2004: Edmonton Trappers
- 2005: New Orleans Zephyrs
- Position: Infield

Coaching career (HC unless noted)
- 2006–2008: Evansville (assistant)
- 2009–present: Evansville

Head coaching record
- Overall: 445–471
- Tournaments: NCAA: 4–3

Accomplishments and honors

Championships
- NCAA Regional (2024); MVC (2014); MVC Tournament (2024)

Awards
- ABCA Regional Coach of the Year (2024); 2× MVC Coach of the Year (2014, 2022)

Wesley Clint Carroll (born January 5, 1979) is an American college baseball coach, currently serving as head coach of the Evansville Purple Aces baseball team. He has held that position since the 2009 season. He played at Evansville, becoming the Purple Aces' first ever Freshman All-American. He then went on to a minor league career, reaching Triple-A and playing in spring training games with his brother Jamey Carroll. He then became an assistant coach with the Purple Aces for three seasons before ascending to the top job.

== Playing career ==
=== Evansville ===
Carroll joined the Aces in 1998 and led the team in hits (88) and assists (147) as a freshman. He earned Collegiate Baseball Freshman All-American Honorable Mention honors after the season, marking the first time in Evansville history that a player was named a Freshman All-American. In 1999, Carroll led the team in doubles (17) and assists (179), earning an All-MVC Honorable Mention selection in the process. During his junior season, Carroll led the team with three triples and 152 assists and was given an All-MVC Honorable Mention selection again. In his final season, Carroll had a .379 batting average with 85 hits and 22 doubles. He was named First Team All-MVC and ABCA/Rawlings Midwest All-Region First Team after the season. He was also awarded the William V. Slyker Award which is awarded yearly to UE's best male athlete. Carroll then declared for the 2001 MLB draft. In 2007, Carroll was named to the MVC All-Centennial Team. As of 2022, Carroll leads Evansville with the most career doubles with 74.

=== Philadelphia Phillies ===
The Philadelphia Phillies drafted Carroll with the 37th round in the 2001 MLB draft. Carroll bounced around is first season playing for the Batavia Muckdogs (.286/.348/.333 in 12 games), Lakewood BlueClaws (.346/.399/.431 in 36 games), and Clearwater Phillies (.200/.368/.200 in 7 games). He spent the majority of the 2002 season as Lakewood's starting second baseman. In 81 games with the BlueClaws, Carroll hit .228 with 16 doubles and 29 RBIs. Following the conclusion of the season, Carroll was released by the Phillies.

=== Montreal Expos / Washington Nationals ===
The Montreal Expos signed Carroll to a minor league contract before the start of the 2003 season. Carroll played 99 games with the Brevard County Manatees while also being called up to Double-A Harrisburg for the first time. Carroll went 7-for-22 in his stint in Harrisburg before returning to Brevard County. To start the 2004 season, Carroll stayed with the Manatees before getting called up to Triple-A Edmonton on June 7. Carroll played 12 games with the Trappers, batting only .207 with seven strikeouts in 29 at-bats. He was sent back down to Brevard County on June 21. Carroll was again called up on August 5 at the end of the Manatees season, this time he rejoined Harrisburg. In 23 games with Harrisburg, Carroll batted .237 with 14 hits. The Washington Nationals kept Carroll in their organization for the 2005 season. He played the full season with the New Orleans Zephyrs of Triple-A. In 70 games, Carroll batted .242 with six doubles, two home runs, and 10 RBIs. He attended the Nationals 2005 spring training, playing two games with his brother Jamey Carroll before retiring ahead of the season.

== Coaching career ==
=== Evansville ===
Before the start of the 2006 season, Carroll was hired as the assistant coach of the Evansville Purple Aces baseball program. He continued to hold that position until 2008.

==== 2009 season ====
On July 2, 2008, Carroll was announced as the Aces next head coach. Carroll's first game as head coach came on February 20, 2009, against East Tennessee State. Evansville would end up losing 10–16. Evansville would then play host to the Dunn Hospitality Diamond Classic and Carroll's first career win would be against Butler during the opening night of the tournament on February 27. They would drop the second game to Saint Louis, but the final day of the tournament was canceled due to cold weather. Carroll's first win against a ranked opponent would come on March 7 against No. 10 Pepperdine in the first game of a doubleheader. Evansville played host to the Dunn Hospitality Diamond Classic II from March 13 to 15. Evansville would win two of their three games. Evansville would finish the season with a 25–30 (7–17 MVC) record, missing the 2009 MVC tournament.

==== 2024 season ====
Carroll entered his 16th season as the Aces head coach in 2024 and started the season taking two out of three games from No. 26 Oral Roberts. Evansville would finish the season 39–26 (17–10 MVC), giving them the third seed in the MVC tournament, which they then hosted. During the first three games of the tournament, Evansville would run rule Illinois State 17–6, UIC 12–1, and Illinois State again 17–7. They would then match up against Indiana State in the MVC Championship Game. After beating them 8–6, they would qualify for the NCAA Division I tournament, their first since 2006.

On May 27, it was announced that Evansville would be the No. 4 seed in the Greenville Regional. They would open the tournament against the nationally seeded East Carolina. Freshman Kenton Deverman would pick up his ninth victory of the season after he pitched eight three-hit innings in the 4–1 win. In their matchup against VCU in the next round, Evansville launched four home runs in an offensive battle, holding on to win 17–11. East Carolina would make it out of the loser's bracket to make the Regional Final in an opening round rematch. The Aces would drop game one but would hold on to win game two to advance to their first Super Regional in program history. They would also become the ninth No. 4 seed since 1999 to win a Regional.

Evansville would face off against No. 1 Tennessee in the Knoxville Super Regional. They would lose their opening game to the Volunteers 6–11 but would bounce back in game two despite a ninth-inning rally by Tennessee to win 10–8. Evansville's Cinderella run would end in game three when the Volunteers launched seven home runs to move on to the Men's College World Series.

Carroll's team would finish the year with a 39–27 record and one win away from their first-ever Men's College World Series birth. Deverman was named MVC Freshman of the Year, marking the first Evansville player to do so since Eric Stamets won the award in 2010. Mark Shallenberger tied for second place in the MVC Player of the Year voting and was named to the All-MVC first team along with Deverman. Deverman also was voted Freshman All-American by the National Collegiate Baseball Writers Association, Baseball America, and D1Baseball, while Shallenberger was named an All-American by the American Baseball Coaches Association and D1Baseball. Carroll would be named ABCA/ATEC Midwest Regional Coach Of The Year after leading the Aces to their highest ranking in school history.

== Head coaching record ==
Record table
Season	Team	Overall	Conference	Standing	Postseason
Evansville Purple Aces (Missouri Valley Conference) (2009–present)
2009	Evansville	25–30	7–17	8th	
2010	Evansville	32–27	10–11	5th	MVC Tournament
2011	Evansville	28–25	7–13	7th	MVC Tournament
2012	Evansville	32–27	10–11	4th	MVC Tournament
2013	Evansville	24–34	10–10	4th	MVC Tournament
2014	Evansville	34–21	15–6	1st	MVC Tournament
2015	Evansville	29–24	8–13	6th	MVC Tournament
2016	Evansville	29–27	9–12	5th	MVC Tournament
2017	Evansville	18–39	8–12	6th	MVC Tournament
2018	Evansville	12–39	3–18	8th	MVC Tournament
2019	Evansville	24–29	11–10	T–4th	MVC Tournament
2020	Evansville	5–11	0–0		Season canceled due to COVID-19
2021	Evansville	28–27	11–16	7th	MVC Tournament
2022	Evansville	32–24	14–6	2nd	MVC Tournament
2023	Evansville	37–24	15–12	T–3rd	MVC Tournament
2024	Evansville	39–26	17–10	T–2nd	NCAA Super Regional
2025	Evansville	17–37	10–17	9th	
Evansville:		445–471	165–194		
Total:		435–471			
National champion Postseason invitational champion Conference regular season champion Conference regular season and conference tournament champion Division regular season champion Division regular season and conference tournament champion Conference tournament champion

== See also ==
- List of current NCAA Division I baseball coaches

https://gopurpleaces.com/sports/baseball/schedule/2022
