= Ken Henderson (baseball coach) =

Biographical details
- Born: September 27, 1960 (age 66)

Playing career
- 1980–1983: Missouri Southern State

Coaching career (HC unless noted)
- 1983: Missouri Southern State (Asst.)
- 1984–1986: Kansas State (Asst.)
- 1987–1989: Oral Roberts (Asst.)
- 1991–2010: Southern Illinois (Asst.)
- 2011–2019: Southern Illinois

Head coaching record
- Overall: 241–294–1

Ken Henderson (born September 27, 1960) is an American college baseball coach with the Southern Illinois Salukis baseball team. He was named interim head coach before the 2011 season, after Dan Callahan died. Henderson had also served as interim head coach for the final 20 games of the 1994 season. He was named permanent head coach after the 2011 season.

Henderson played at Missouri Southern State, graduating in 1983. He began his coaching career with the Lions as a student assistant coach for the 1983 season. He then served for three years at Kansas State and three more years as recruiting coordinator at Oral Roberts. He was credited by Collegiate Baseball with assembling a highly ranked class in 1987. In 1991, he arrived at Southern Illinois, and added associate head coach duties in 1993. He coached 35 players at SIU who went on to be drafted, including Jerry Hairston Jr. and Jason Frasor. After the 2012 season, he was extended by SIU until 2014. On June 3, 2019, Henderson stepped down from his position with Southern Illinois.

== Head coaching record ==
This table depicts Henderson's record as a head coach.

Record table
Season	Team	Overall	Conference	Standing	Postseason
Southern Illinois Salukis (Missouri Valley Conference) (2011–2019)
1994	Southern Illinois	12–8 (Note: Finished season as interim head coach.)	11–6		MVC Tournament
2011	Southern Illinois	23–34	11–10	5th	MVC Tournament
2012	Southern Illinois	31–28	9–12	6th	MVC Tournament
2013	Southern Illinois	25–33	6–15	7th	MVC Tournament
2014	Southern Illinois	26–31	4–17	8th	MVC Tournament
2015	Southern Illinois	12–46	6–15	8th	MVC Tournament
2016	Southern Illinois	31–25–1	11–10	4th	MVC Tournament
2017	Southern Illinois	27–30	10–10	4th	MVC Tournament
2018	Southern Illinois	28–30	11–10	5th	MVC Tournament
2019	Southern Illinois	26–29	5–16	8th	MVC Tournament
Southern Illinois:		241–294–1	84–121		
Total:		241–294–1			
National champion Postseason invitational champion Conference regular season champion Conference regular season and conference tournament champion Division regular season champion Division regular season and conference tournament champion Conference tournament champion
