= Missouri Valley Conference baseball tournament =

- Conference baseball tournament
- Sport: Baseball
- Conference: Missouri Valley Conference
- Number of teams: 6
- Current stadium: Reagan Field
- Current location: Murray, Kentucky
- Played: 1962–1964; 1970–1980; 1982–present
- Last contest: 2026
- Current champion: UIC (1st title)
- Most championships: Wichita State (18 titles)
- Official website: mvc-sports.org baseball

Sponsors
- ConAgra Foods (2005–2007); State Farm (2008–present)

Host stadiums
- Unknown (1949, 1951–1952, 1956, 1971, 1974–1975); Tom Connor Field (1950, 1959, 1968); Buffalo Stadium (1958, 1960); Meyers Field (1961, 1970); Busch Stadium (1962–1963); Parkway Field (1964); Sauget Field (1965–1966); Fletcher Field (1967); Oiler Park (1969); Nat Buring Stadium (1972–1973); Johnny Rosenblatt Stadium (1977–1978); Eck Stadium (1979–1981, 1983, 1985, 1987–1994, 1996–1997, 1999–2003, 2005–2006, 2008–2010, 2015); Sycamore Stadium (1982, 2014, 2016, 2023); Abe Martin Field / Itchy Jones Stadium (1984, 1986, 2021); Lanphier Park (1995); Bosse Field (1998); Hammons Field (2004, 2007, 2012, 2017, 2022); TD Ameritrade Park Omaha (2011); Duffy Bass Field (2013, 2019, 2025); Horner Ballpark (2018); Charles H. Braun Stadium (2024); Reagan Field (2026)

Host locations
- Stillwater, Oklahoma (1949, 1952, 1956); Peoria, Illinois (1950, 1959, 1968); Tulsa, Oklahoma (1951, 1969, 1974–1975); Houston, Texas (1958, 1960); Cincinnati, Ohio (1961, 1970); St. Louis, Missouri (1962–1963, 1965–1966); Louisville, Kentucky (1964); Collinsville, Illinois (1967); St. Ann, Missouri (1971); Memphis, Tennessee (1972–1973); Omaha, Nebraska (1977–1978, 2011); Wichita, Kansas (1979–1981, 1983, 1985, 1987–1994, 1996–1997, 1999–2003, 2005–2006, 2008–2010, 2015); Terre Haute, Indiana (1982, 2014, 2016, 2023); Carbondale, Illinois (1984, 1986, 2021); Springfield, Illinois (1995); Evansville, Indiana (1998, 2024); Springfield, Missouri (2004, 2007, 2012, 2017, 2022); Normal, Illinois (2013, 2019, 2025); Dallas, Texas (2018); Murray, Kentucky (2026)

The Missouri Valley Conference baseball tournament is the conference baseball championship of the NCAA Division I Missouri Valley Conference. Six teams participate in the double-elimination tournament. The 2025 Missouri Valley Conference Baseball tournament was held in Normal, Illinois at Duffy Bass Field. The winner of the tournament receives an automatic berth to the NCAA Division I Baseball Championship.

== Champions ==
Year	Host city	Stadium	Championship Results		
Year	Host city	Stadium	Champions	Series	Runner-ups
MVC Championship Series (1949–1952; 1956–1961)
1949	Stillwater, Oklahoma		Oklahoma A&M (West)	2 – 0	Bradley (East)
1950	Peoria, Illinois	Tom Connor Field	Bradley (East)	2 – 1	Oklahoma A&M (West)
1951	Tulsa, Oklahoma		Houston (West)	2 – 0	Bradley (East)
1952	Stillwater, Oklahoma		Saint Louis (North)	2 – 0	Houston (South)^{1}
1953					
1954
1955
1956	Stillwater, Oklahoma		Bradley (East)	2 – 0	Oklahoma A&M (West)
1957	No series played (Note: The 1957 series was rained out and no champion was crowned. The series was scheduled to be Bradley vs. Oklahoma A&M.)				
1958	Houston, Texas	Buffalo Stadium	Cincinnati (East)	2 – 1	Houston (West)
1959	Peoria, Illinois	Tom Connor Field	Bradley (East)	2 – 1	Houston (West)
1960	Houston, Texas	Buffalo Stadium	Houston (West)	1 – 0 (Note: The 1960 series was originally scheduled to be a best-of-three format, but due to the May 20 doubleheader being rained out, they played a single game on May 21 for the championship.)	Cincinnati (East)
1961	Cincinnati, Ohio	Meyers Field	Cincinnati (East)	2 – 0	Tulsa (West)
MVC Tournament (1962–1964)
1962	St. Louis, Missouri	Busch Stadium	Bradley	1 – 0	Saint Louis
1963	St. Louis, Missouri	Busch Stadium	Saint Louis	1 – 0	Bradley
1964	Louisville, Kentucky	Parkway Field	Saint Louis	1 – 0	Louisville
MVC Championship Series (1965–1970)
1965	St. Louis, Missouri	Sauget Field	Saint Louis (West)	2 – 0	Cincinnati (East)
1966	St. Louis, Missouri	Sauget Field	Saint Louis (East)	2 – 0	Wichita State (West)
1967	Collinsville, Illinois	Fletcher Field	Cincinnati (East)	2 – 1	Saint Louis (West)
1968	Peoria, Illinois	Tom Connor Field	Bradley (East)	2 – 0	Tulsa (West)
1969	Tulsa, Oklahoma	Oiler Park	Tulsa (West)	2 – 1	Cincinnati (East)
1970	Cincinnati, Ohio	Meyers Field	Tulsa (West)	2 – 0	Cincinnati (East)
MVC Tournament (1971–1980)
1971	St. Ann, Missouri		Tulsa	2 – 0^{[L]}	Bradley
1972	Memphis, Tennessee	Nat Buring Stadium	Tulsa	1 – 0	Bradley
1973	Memphis, Tennessee	Nat Buring Stadium	Tulsa	1 – 0	Memphis State
1974	Tulsa, Oklahoma		Tulsa	1 – 0	Drake
1975	Tulsa, Oklahoma		Tulsa	1 – 0	Southern Illinois
1976	Tournament cancelled due to inclement weather				
1977	Omaha, Nebraska	Johnny Rosenblatt Stadium	Southern Illinois	1 – 0	Bradley
1978	Omaha, Nebraska	Johnny Rosenblatt Stadium	Southern Illinois	1 – 0	Wichita State
1979	Wichita, Kansas	Eck Stadium	Indiana State	2 – 0^{[L]}	Tulsa
1980	Wichita, Kansas	Eck Stadium	Wichita State	1 – 0	Southern Illinois
MVC Championship Series (1981)
1981	Wichita, Kansas	Eck Stadium	Southern Illinois (East)	2 – 1	Wichita State (West)
MVC Tournament (1982–present)
1982	Terre Haute, Indiana	Sycamore Stadium	Wichita State (West)	1 – 0	Southern Illinois (East)
1983	Wichita, Kansas	Eck Stadium	Indiana State (East)	1 – 0	Southern Illinois (East)
1984	Carbondale, Illinois	Abe Martin Field	Indiana State	1 – 1	Wichita State
1985	Wichita, Kansas	Eck Stadium	Wichita State	1 – 0	Indiana State
1986	Carbondale, Illinois	Abe Martin Field	Indiana State	1 – 0	Southern Illinois
1987	Wichita, Kansas	Eck Stadium	Wichita State	2 – 0^{[L]}	Indiana State
1988	Wichita, Kansas	Eck Stadium	Wichita State	0 – 0 (Note: In 1988, the MVC made a controversial decision by awarding Wichita State the championship after the title game against Creighton was suspended due to rain. The title game was set to be resumed the following Monday, with a second game if Creighton won, but the NCAA informed the MVC that it would only receive one bid to the NCAA tournament.)	Creighton
1989	Wichita, Kansas	Eck Stadium	Indiana State	1 – 0	Wichita State
1990	Wichita, Kansas	Eck Stadium	Southern Illinois	1 – 0	Creighton
1991	Wichita, Kansas	Eck Stadium	Wichita State	1 – 0	Creighton
1992	Wichita, Kansas	Eck Stadium	Wichita State	1 – 1	Creighton
1993	Wichita, Kansas	Eck Stadium	Wichita State	1 – 0	Indiana State
1994	Wichita, Kansas	Eck Stadium			
1995	Springfield, Illinois	Lanphier Park			
1996	Wichita, Kansas	Eck Stadium			
1997	Wichita, Kansas	Eck Stadium			
1998	Evansville, Indiana	Bosse Field			
1999	Wichita, Kansas	Eck Stadium			
2000	Wichita, Kansas	Eck Stadium			
2001	Wichita, Kansas	Eck Stadium			
2002	Wichita, Kansas	Eck Stadium			
2003	Wichita, Kansas	Eck Stadium			
2004	Springfield, Missouri	Hammons Field			
2005	Wichita, Kansas	Eck Stadium			
2006	Wichita, Kansas	Eck Stadium			
2007	Springfield, Missouri	Hammons Field			
2008	Wichita, Kansas	Eck Stadium			
2009	Wichita, Kansas	Eck Stadium			
2010	Wichita, Kansas	Eck Stadium	Illinois State	1 – 0	Wichita State
2011	Omaha, Nebraska	TD Ameritrade Park Omaha	Creighton	1 – 0	Wichita State
2012	Springfield, Missouri	Hammons Field	Creighton	1 – 0	Southern Illinois
2013	Normal, Illinois	Duffy Bass Field	Wichita State	1 – 0	Illinois State
2014	Terre Haute, Indiana	Sycamore Stadium	Dallas Baptist	1 – 0	Illinois State
2015	Wichita, Kansas	Eck Stadium	Missouri State	1 – 0	Bradley
2016	Terre Haute, Indiana	Sycamore Stadium	Dallas Baptist	1 – 0	Missouri State
2017	Springfield, Missouri	Hammons Field	Dallas Baptist	1 – 0	Illinois State
2018	Dallas, Texas	Horner Ballpark	Missouri State	1 – 0	Dallas Baptist
2019	Normal, Illinois	Duffy Bass Field	Indiana State	2 – 0^{[L]}	Dallas Baptist
2020	Tournament canceled due to the COVID-19 pandemic				
2021	Carbondale, Illinois	Itchy Jones Stadium	Dallas Baptist	1 – 0	Indiana State
2022	Springfield, Missouri	Hammons Field	Missouri State	1 – 1	Southern Illinois
2023	Terre Haute, Indiana	Sycamore Stadium	Indiana State	1 – 1	Evansville
2024	Evansville, Indiana	Charles H. Braun Stadium	Evansville	1 – 0	Indiana State
2025	Normal, Illinois	Duffy Bass Field	Murray State	1 – 0	Missouri State
2026	Murray, Kentucky	Reagan Field	UIC	1 – 0	Southern Illinois

Legend

- ^{L} Indicates the team that won the conference championship series was from the loser's bracket.

=== By school ===
In the sortable table below, teams are ordered first by number of appearances, then by winning percentage, and finally by year of first appearance. In the "Season(s)" column, bold years indicate winning appearances.

Team	Apps	W–L	Pct.	Season(s)
Cincinnati	7	7–9	.438	1958, 1960, 1961, 1965, 1967, 1969, 1970
Bradley	6	8–6	.571	1949, 1950, 1951, 1956, 1959, 1968
Houston	5	5–6	.455	1951, 1952, 1958, 1959, 1960
Saint Louis	4	7–2	.778	1952, 1965, 1966, 1967
Tulsa	4	4–5	.444	1961, 1968, 1969, 1970
Oklahoma A&M	3	3–4	.429	1949, 1950, 1956
Wichita State	2	1–4	.200	1966, 1981
Southern Illinois	1	2–1	.667	1981

== Champions ==
=== By year ===
The following is a list of conference champions and sites listed by year.

Year	Program	Site
1947	Oklahoma A&M	
1948	Oklahoma A&M	
1949	Oklahoma A&M	
1950	Bradley	
1951	Houston	
1952	Saint Louis	
1953	Houston	
1954	Oklahoma A&M	
1955	Oklahoma A&M	
1956	Bradley	
1957	Bradley	
1958	Cincinnati	
1959	Bradley	
1960	Houston	
1961	Cincinnati	
1962	Bradley	
1963	Saint Louis	
1964	Saint Louis	
1965	Saint Louis	
1966	Saint Louis	
1967	Cincinnati	
1968	Bradley	
1969	Tulsa	
1970	Tulsa	
1971	Tulsa	
1972	Tulsa	
1973	Tulsa	
1974	Tulsa	
1975	Tulsa	
1976	No Tournament	
1977	Southern Illinois	
1978	Southern Illinois	
1979	Indiana State	
1980	Wichita State	
1981	Southern Illinois	
1982	Wichita State	
1983	Indiana State	
1984	Indiana State	
1985	Wichita State	
1986	Indiana State	
1987	Wichita State	
1988*	Wichita State	
1989	Indiana State	
1990	Southern Illinois	
1991	Wichita State	
1992	Wichita State	
1993	Wichita State	
1994	Illinois State	
1995	Indiana State	
1996	Missouri State	
1997	Missouri State	
1998	Wichita State	
1999	Wichita State	
2000	Wichita State	
2001	Northern Iowa	
2002	Wichita State	
2003	Wichita State	
2004	Wichita State	Hammons Field • Springfield, MO
2005	Wichita State	Eck Stadium • Wichita, KS
2006	Evansville	Eck Stadium • Wichita, KS
2007	Creighton	Hammons Field • Springfield, MO
2008	Wichita State	Eck Stadium • Wichita, KS
2009	Wichita State	Eck Stadium • Wichita, KS
2010	Illinois State	Eck Stadium • Wichita, KS
2011	Creighton	TD Ameritrade Park • Omaha, NE
2012	Creighton	Hammons Field • Springfield, MO
2013	Wichita State	Duffy Bass Field • Normal, IL
2014	Dallas Baptist	Bob Warn Field at Sycamore Stadium • Terre Haute, IN
2015	Missouri State	Eck Stadium • Wichita, KS
2016	Dallas Baptist	Bob Warn Field at Sycamore Stadium • Terre Haute, IN
2017	Dallas Baptist	Hammons Field • Springfield, MO
2018	Missouri State	Horner Ballpark • Dallas, TX
2019	Indiana State	Duffy Bass Field • Normal, IL
2020	Cancelled due to the coronavirus pandemic	
2021	Dallas Baptist	Itchy Jones Stadium • Carbondale, IL
2022	Missouri State	Hammons Field • Springfield, MO
2023	Indiana State	Bob Warn Field at Sycamore Stadium • Terre Haute, IN
2024	Evansville	German American Bank Field • Evansville, IN
2025	Murray State	Duffy Bass Field • Normal, IL
2026	UIC	Reagan Field • Murray, KY

*Indicates declared champion, tournament final canceled due to inclement weather.

=== By school ===
The following is a list of tournament championships listed by school.

Program	Championships	Years
Wichita State	18	1980, 1982, 1985, 1987, 1988, 1991, 1992, 1993, 1998, 1999, 2000, 2002, 2003, 2004, 2005, 2008, 2009, 2013
Indiana State	8	1979, 1983, 1984, 1986, 1989, 1995, 2019, 2023
Tulsa	7	1969, 1970, 1971, 1972, 1973, 1974, 1975
Bradley	6	1950, 1956, 1957, 1959, 1962, 1968
Oklahoma A&M	5	1947, 1948, 1949, 1954, 1955
Saint Louis	5	1952, 1963, 1964, 1965, 1966
Missouri State	5	1996, 1997, 2015, 2018, 2022
Dallas Baptist	4	2014, 2016, 2017, 2021
Southern Illinois	4	1977, 1978, 1981, 1990
Cincinnati	3	1958, 1961, 1967
Creighton	3	2007, 2011, 2012
Houston	3	1951, 1953, 1960
Evansville	2	2006, 2024
Illinois State	2	1994, 2010
UIC	1	2026
Murray State	1	2025
Northern Iowa	1	2001

- Schools highlighted in pink indicate that the program no longer fields a baseball team in the Missouri Valley Conference.
