= List of Wichita State Shockers baseball seasons =

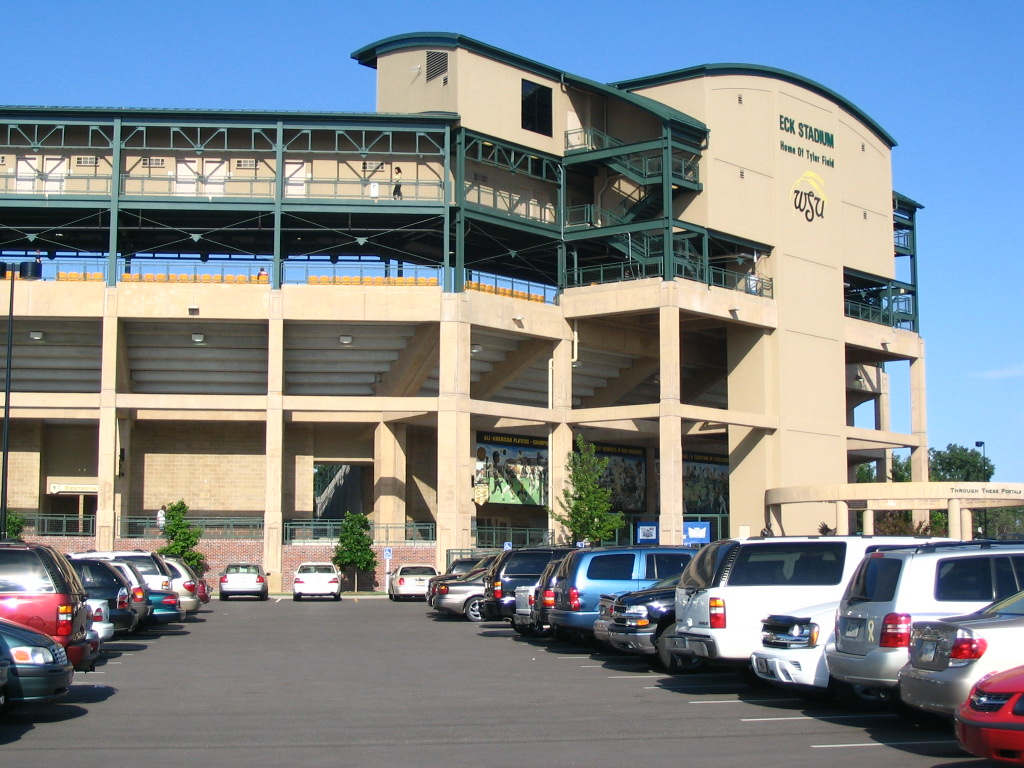
Eck Stadium

This is a list of Wichita State Shockers baseball seasons. The Wichita State Shockers baseball program is the college baseball team that represents Wichita State University in the American Athletic Conference in the National Collegiate Athletic Association. Wichita State plays their home games at Eck Stadium in Wichita, Kansas.

Wichita State has won one national championship and appeared in seven College World Series.

== Season results ==
National champions	College World Series berth	NCAA tournament berth	Conference Tournament champions	Conference/Division Regular season Champions

Season	Head coach	Conference	Season results									Tournament results		Final poll (Note: Collegiate Baseball began team rankings in 1959.)
Season	Head coach	Conference	Overall				Conference/Division					Conference (Note: The Missouri Valley Conference began a baseball tournament in 1947.)	Postseason (Note: Postseason play involving the NCAA Division I Baseball Championship began in 1947.)	CB
Season	Head coach	Conference	Wins	Losses	Ties	%	Wins	Losses	Ties	%	Finish	Conference	Postseason	CB
Wichita State Shockers
1899	Harry Hess	Independent	0	1	0	.000	—	—	—	—	—	—	—	—
1900	Harry Hess	Independent	0	0	0	–	—	—	—	—	—	—	—	—
1901	Harry Hess	Independent	7	4	0	.636	—	—	—	—	—	—	—	—
1902	C.P. Clark	Independent	8	4	0	.667	—	—	—	—	—	—	—	—
1903	Student coaches	Independent	8	6	0	.571	—	—	—	—	—	—	—	—
1904	Walter P. Frantz	Independent	8	2	0	.800	—	—	—	—	—	—	—	—
1905	A.F. Holst	Independent	9	6	2	.588	—	—	—	—	—	—	—	—
1906	Willis Bates	Independent	9	6	0	.600	—	—	—	—	—	—	—	—
1907	Willis Bates	Kansas Collegiate Athletic Conference	8	9	0	.471	—	—	—	—	—	—	—	—
1908	Willis Bates	Kansas Collegiate Athletic Conference	8	4	0	.667	—	—	—	—	—	—	—	—
1909	Roy K. Thomas	Kansas Collegiate Athletic Conference	4	5	0	.444	—	—	—	—	—	—	—	—
1910	Roy K. Thomas	Kansas Collegiate Athletic Conference	0	6	0	.000	—	—	—	—	—	—	—	—
1911	Roy K. Thomas	Kansas Collegiate Athletic Conference	7	5	0	.583	—	—	—	—	—	—	—	—
1912	Roy K. Thomas	Kansas Collegiate Athletic Conference	12	3	1	.781	—	—	—	—	—	—	—	—
1913	E. Van Long	Kansas Collegiate Athletic Conference	2	12	0	.143	—	—	—	—	—	—	—	—
1914	Willis Bates	Kansas Collegiate Athletic Conference	12	7	0	.632	—	—	—	—	—	—	—	—
1915	Harry Buck	Kansas Collegiate Athletic Conference	1	5	1	.214	—	—	—	—	—	—	—	—
1916	Harry Buck	Kansas Collegiate Athletic Conference	2	4	0	.333	—	—	—	—	—	—	—	—
1917	Lamar Hoover	Kansas Collegiate Athletic Conference	2	12	0	.143	—	—	—	—	—	—	—	—
1918	Lamar Hoover	Kansas Collegiate Athletic Conference	1	0	0	1.000	—	—	—	—	—	—	—	—
1919	Lamar Hoover	Kansas Collegiate Athletic Conference	1	0	0	1.000	—	—	—	—	—	—	—	—
1920	No Team													
1921	No Team													
1922	No records available													
1923	No records available													
1924	No Team													
1925	No Team													
1926	No Team													
1927	No Team													
1928	No Team													
1929	No Team													
1930	No Team													
1931	No Team													
1932	No Team													
1933	No Team													
1934	No Team													
1935	No Team													
1936	No Team													
1937	No Team													
1938	No Team													
1939	No Team													
1940	No Team													
1941	No Team													
1942	No Team													
1943	No Team													
1944	No Team													
1945	No Team													
1946	No Team													
1947	No Team													
1948	Lyle Sturdy	Missouri Valley Conference	4	4	0	.500	—	—	—	—	—	—	DNP	—
1949	Ken Gunning	Missouri Valley Conference	4	9	0	.308	0	5	0	.000			DNP	—
1950	Ken Gunning	Missouri Valley Conference	4	14	0	.222	1	5	0	.167			DNP	—
1951	Ken Gunning/Bob Carlson/Norvall Neve	Missouri Valley Conference	4	9	0	.308	1	5	0	.167	8th		DNP	—
1952	Dick Miller	Missouri Valley Conference	3	10	0	.231	0	6	0	.000	6th		DNP	—
1953	Dick Miller	Missouri Valley Conference	1	9	0	.100	0	6	0	.000	6th		DNP	—
1954	Forrest Jensen	Missouri Valley Conference	4	9	0	.308	2	7	0	.222			DNP	—
1955	Forrest Jensen	Missouri Valley Conference	4	13	0	.235	3	6	0	.333			DNP	—
1956	Jerry Bupp	Missouri Valley Conference	4	13	0	.235	1	8	0	.111			DNP	—
1957	Ray Morrisson	Missouri Valley Conference	7	12	0	.368	2	7	0	.222			DNP	—
1958	Ray Morrisson	Missouri Valley Conference	17	8	0	.680	2	7	0	.222			DNP	—
1959	Ray Morrisson	Missouri Valley Conference	15	12	0	.556	2	4	0	.333			DNP	NR
1960	Ray Morrisson	Missouri Valley Conference	15	12	0	.556	3	2	0	.600			DNP	NR
1961	Dick Miller	Missouri Valley Conference	9	7	0	.563	0	4	0	.000			DNP	NR
1962	No Team													
1963	No Team													
1964	Lanny Van Eman	Missouri Valley Conference	8	10	0	.444	0	4	0	.000			DNP	NR
1965	Verlyn Anderson	Missouri Valley Conference	7	13	0	.350	4	5	0	.444			DNP	NR
1966	Verlyn Anderson	Missouri Valley Conference	10	8	1	.553	4	2	0	.667			DNP	NR
1967	Verlyn Anderson	Missouri Valley Conference	11	13	0	.458	2	4	0	.333			DNP	NR
1968	Verlyn Anderson	Missouri Valley Conference	16	8	0	.667	4	3	0	.571			DNP	NR
1969	Verlyn Anderson	Missouri Valley Conference	17	12	0	.586	6	3	0	.667	4th		DNP	NR
1970	Verlyn Anderson	Missouri Valley Conference	6	17	0	.261	3	5	0	.375			DNP	NR
1971	No Team													
1972	No Team													
1973	No Team													
1974	No Team													
1975	No Team													
1976	No Team													
1977	No Team													
1978	Gene Stephenson	Missouri Valley Conference	43	30	1	.588	—	—	—	—	—	—	DNP	NR
1979	Gene Stephenson	Missouri Valley Conference	65	15	0	.813	10	2	0	.833			DNP	NR
1980	Gene Stephenson	Missouri Valley Conference	53	12	0	.815	7	1	0	.875		1st	Midwest Regional	
1981	Gene Stephenson	Missouri Valley Conference	56	15	0	.789	15	1	0	.938			Atlantic Regional	
1982	Gene Stephenson	Missouri Valley Conference	73	14	0	.839	15	1	0	.938		1st	College World Series Runner-up	2
1983	Gene Stephenson	Missouri Valley Conference	55	18	0	.753	7	1	0	.875			Midwest Regional	
1984	Gene Stephenson	Missouri Valley Conference	40	22	0	.645	7	7	0	.500			DNP	
1985	Gene Stephenson	Missouri Valley Conference	68	20	0	.773	7	1	0	.875	1st	1st	Midwest Regional	
1986	Gene Stephenson	Missouri Valley Conference	45	18	0	.714	12	8	0	.600			DNP	
1987	Gene Stephenson	Missouri Valley Conference	59	20	0	.747	13	7	0	.650	1st	1st	West I Regional	
1988	Gene Stephenson	Missouri Valley Conference	56	16	0	.778	16	4	0	.800	1st	1st	College World Series	
1989	Gene Stephenson	Missouri Valley Conference	68	16	0	.810	13	5	0	.722	1st		National champions	1
1990	Gene Stephenson	Missouri Valley Conference	45	19	0	.703	14	6	0	.700	1st		Midwest Regional	
1991	Gene Stephenson	Missouri Valley Conference	66	13	0	.835	21	3	0	.875	1st	1st	College World Series Runner-up	2
1992	Gene Stephenson	Missouri Valley Conference	56	11	0	.836	18	3	0	.857	1st	1st	College World Series	
1993	Gene Stephenson	Missouri Valley Conference	58	17	0	.773	17	3	0	.850	1st	1st	College World Series Runner-up	2
1994	Gene Stephenson	Missouri Valley Conference	45	17	0	.726	19	2	0	.905	1st		Midwest II Regional	
1995	Gene Stephenson	Missouri Valley Conference	53	17	0	.757	24	8	0	.923	1st		Midwest I Regional	
1996	Gene Stephenson	Missouri Valley Conference	54	11	0	.831	24	4	0	.857	1st		College World Series	
1997	Gene Stephenson	Missouri Valley Conference	51	18	0	.739	21	7	0	.750	1st		South II Regional	
1998	Gene Stephenson	Missouri Valley Conference	56	7	0	.889	26	1	0	.963	1st	1st	Midwest Regional	
1999	Gene Stephenson	Missouri Valley Conference	59	14	0	.808	24	7	0	.774	1st	1st	Wichita Regional	
2000	Gene Stephenson	Missouri Valley Conference	44	21	0	.677	24	8	0	.750	1st	1st	Minneapolis Regional	
2001	Gene Stephenson	Missouri Valley Conference	42	24	0	.636	21	11	0	.656			DNP	
2002	Gene Stephenson	Missouri Valley Conference	47	17	0	.734	23	9	0	.719	1st	1st	Wichita Regional	
2003	Gene Stephenson	Missouri Valley Conference	49	27	0	.645	19	13	0	.594		1st	Houston Regional	
2004	Gene Stephenson	Missouri Valley Conference	49	16	0	.754	28	4	0	.875	1st	1st	Fayetteville Regional	
2005	Gene Stephenson	Missouri Valley Conference	51	24	0	.680	23	9	0	.719		1st	Knoxville Regional	
2006	Gene Stephenson	Missouri Valley Conference	46	22	0	.676	15	9	0	.625			Norman Regional	
2007	Gene Stephenson	Missouri Valley Conference	53	22	0	.707	20	4	0	.833	1st		Wichita Super Regional	
2008	Gene Stephenson	Missouri Valley Conference	48	17	0	.738	19	5	0	.792	1st	1st	Tallahassee Super Regional	
2009	Gene Stephenson	Missouri Valley Conference	30	27	0	.526	11	7	0	.611		1st	Norman Regional	
2010	Gene Stephenson	Missouri Valley Conference	39	26	0	.600	15	6	0	.714	1st		DNP	
2011	Gene Stephenson	Missouri Valley Conference	39	26	0	.600	14	7	0	.667			DNP	
2012 (Note: Original 2012 record 35–25, 12–9 MVC)	Gene Stephenson	Missouri Valley Conference	5	25	0	.167	0	9	0	.000	3rd	First Round	DNP	
2013 (Note: Original 2013 record, 39–26, 15–6 MVC. MVC Tournament title and postseason appearance in Manhattan Regional vacated by NCAA.)	Gene Stephenson	Missouri Valley Conference	0	26	0	.000	0	6	0	.000	2nd	1st	Manhattan Regional	
2014	Todd Butler	Missouri Valley Conference	31	28	0	.525	13	8	0	.619	4th	Semifinals	DNP	
2015	Todd Butler	Missouri Valley Conference	26	33	0	.441	10	11	0	.476	4th	Semifinals	DNP	
2016	Todd Butler	Missouri Valley Conference	21	37	0	.362	9	12	0	.429	T-5th	First Round	DNP	
2017	Todd Butler	Missouri Valley Conference	28	30	0	.483	10	11	0	.476	5th	Second Round	DNP	
2018	Todd Butler	American Conference	35	21	1	.623	9	14	1	.396	T-7th	Second Round	DNP	
2019	Todd Butler	American Conference	28	31	0	.475	9	15	0	.375	8th	Semifinals	DNP	
2020	Eric Wedge	American Conference	13	2	0	.867	0	0	0	–		Not Played	Not Played	30
2021	Eric Wedge	American Conference	31	23	0	.574	18	13	0	.581	3rd	Second Round	DNP	
2022	Eric Wedge	American Conference	21	36	0	.368	11	16	0	.407	T-6th	First Round	DNP	
2023	Loren Hibbs	American Conference	30	23	0	.566	13	10	0	.565	3rd	First Round	DNP	
2024	Brian Green	American Conference	32	29	0	.525	15	12	0	.556	T–3rd	Finals	DNP	
2025	Brian Green	American Conference	20	36	0	.357	11	16	0	.407	7th	First round	DNP	

=== Notes ===
Sources:
