= Todd Butler =

American baseball player and coach

Current position
- Title: Senior Associate Athletics Director
- Team: McNeese State
- Conference: Southland

Biographical details
- Born: July 23, 1966 (age 60); Alexandria, Louisiana, U.S.

Playing career
- 1985–1986: McNeese State
- 1987–1988: Oklahoma

Coaching career (HC unless noted)
- 1991: McNeese State (asst.)
- 1992: Blinn (asst.)
- 1993–1994: McNeese State (Asst.)
- 1995–2000: Alabama (H/OF)
- 2001–2003: McNeese State
- 2004–2005: Alabama (RC/H/INF)
- 2006–2013: Arkansas (asst.)
- 2014–2019: Wichita State
- 2020: Missouri (RC)

Administrative career (AD unless noted)
- 2021: McNeese State (SAAD)

Head coaching record
- Overall: 259–263
- Tournaments: NCAA: 0–2

Todd Butler (born July 23, 1966) is an American college baseball coach and former player. He played college baseball at McNeese State University from 1985 to 1986 before transferring to the University of Oklahoma in 1987 and 1988. He spent three years as the head coach at McNeese State from 2001 to 2003 and was the head coach of the Wichita State University from 2014 to 2019. Butler spent 16 seasons as an assistant coach in the Southeastern Conference under legendary Alabama coach Jim Wells and Arkansas coach Dave Van Horn.

During Butler's 23-year career as an NCAA Division I assistant or head coach, he has helped his teams to five College World Series appearances, 17 NCAA regionals, four NCAA super regionals, six conference tournament championships and his teams have been ranked No. 1 five times in his career. In addition, Butler has coached 32 All-Americans and Freshman All-Americans, 150 players drafted in the MLB Draft and 27 Major League players.

== Playing career ==
Butler played for McNeese State and Oklahoma. In 1986, he played collegiate summer baseball with the Wareham Gatemen of the Cape Cod Baseball League. He was a captain with the Sooners in his senior year of 1988, and was named a third-team All-American and earned All-Big 8 honors. He signed with the Cleveland Indians as an undrafted free agent, and played the remainder of the 1988 season with Indians affiliates in Burlington, N.C. and Waterloo, Iowa.

== Coaching career ==
Butler returned to McNeese State to complete his degree, and served as a student assistant in 1991. He then worked one season at Blinn before returning as a full-time assistant at McNeese State for two years. Butler then served six seasons at Alabama. Butler served as the hitting instructor and outfielders coach during his first stint with the Crimson Tide from 1995 to 2000. He helped guide Alabama to six NCAA Regional appearances as well as three trips to the College World Series in 1996, 1997 (national runner-up) and 1999 (Final Four). The 1997 team was the national runner-up. The Tide advanced to the SEC Tournament in all six of those seasons, claiming the SEC Tournament title in 1995, 1996, 1997 and 1999.

Butler served as the hitting instructor and outfielders coach during those first six years, as well as being one of the chief recruiters. Butler earned his reputation as one of the country's top recruiters during those first six years at Alabama. He helped the Crimson Tide land some of the nation's top talent as Alabama recorded three-consecutive top-10 recruiting classes. The Tide's 1999 freshman class was ranked as the fourth-best in the country and still ranks as the highest ranked class in school history.

In 2001, Butler took over as head coach at McNeese State in his hometown of Lake Charles, La., where he compiled a 90–83 (.520) overall record in three seasons. In his last season at McNeese, he guided the Cowboys to the 2003 Southland Conference Tournament championship, their first in 10 years.

The win at the conference tournament secured just the fourth NCAA Regional bid in McNeese State's history and the Cowboys were sent to the Houston Regional at Rice's Reckling Park. Butler's team gave eventual national champion Rice all they could handle before falling to the Owls, 3–2, in 10 innings. Ole Miss eliminated the Cowboys from the 64-team field the following day.

While at McNeese State, Butler signed Clay Buccholz (Boston Red Sox) and coached Wade LeBlanc (Miami Marlins) and Jacob Marceaux (first rounder for the Miami Marlins). After three seasons, he returned to Alabama as recruiting coordinator, where he remained for two seasons before accepting the same position at Arkansas.

During his eight seasons at Arkansas, Butler led the Razorbacks to two College World Series appearances (2009 Final Four, 2012 Final Four), eight NCAA regional berths, three NCAA super regional appearances, and two SEC Western Division titles. He also built five top-10 recruiting classes and saw 51 players selected in the MLB Draft, including 12 in the first two rounds. Under Butler, six players earned All-American honors—Nick Schmidt, Jess Todd, Zack Cox, Brett Eibner, Matt Reynolds, and Ryne Stanek. Additionally, 51 of his players were drafted, with nine reaching the Major Leagues: Craig Gentry, Blake Parker, Duke Welker, Jess Todd, Logan Forsythe, Dallas Keuchel, Drew Smyly, James McCann, and Andy Wilkins.

On June 16, 2013, Butler was introduced as head coach at Wichita State, succeeding the legendary Gene Stephenson.

On May 26, 2019, Butler was fired from Wichita State.

After a single season as the recruiting coordinator at Missouri, Butler was relieved of his duties.

== Head coaching record ==
The following table depicts Butler's record as a head coach at the Division I level.

Record table
Season	Team	Overall	Conference	Standing	Postseason
McNeese State Cowboys (Southland Conference) (2001–2003)
2001	McNeese State	29–25	12–15	7th	
2002	McNeese State	30–28	15–12	5th	
2003	McNeese State	31–30	12–15	6th	NCAA Regional
McNeese State:		90–83 (.520)	39–42 (.481)		
Wichita State Shockers (Missouri Valley Conference) (2014–2017)
2014	Wichita State	31–28	13–8	4th	MVC tournament
2015	Wichita State	26–33	10–11	T–3rd	MVC tournament
2016	Wichita State	21–37	9–12	T–5th	MVC tournament
2017	Wichita State	28–30	10–11	5th	MVC tournament
Wichita State Shockers (American Athletic Conference) (2018–2019)
2018	Wichita State	35–21–1	9–14–1	7th	The American tournament
2019	Wichita State	28–31	9–15	8th	The American tournament
Wichita State:		169–180–1 (.484)	60–71–1 (.458)		
Total:		259–263 (.496)			
National champion Postseason invitational champion Conference regular season champion Conference regular season and conference tournament champion Division regular season champion Division regular season and conference tournament champion Conference tournament champion

== Admin career ==
In June, 2020, Butler returned to McNeese State as the Senior Associate Athletic Director.
