= Keith Guttin =

American college baseball coach

Biographical details
- Education: Southwest Missouri State

Playing career
- 1974–1975: Mineral Area College
- 1976–1977: Southwest Missouri State
- Position: Second baseman

Coaching career (HC unless noted)
- 1979–1981: Southwest Missouri State (assistant)
- 1982: Rend Lake College (assistant)
- 1983–2024: Southwest/Missouri State

Head coaching record
- Overall: 1,396–929 (.600)

Accomplishments and honors

Awards
- 5× AMCU/Mid-Con Coach of the Year (1985, 1986, 1987, 1988, 1989); 7× Missouri Valley (1993, 2001, 2003, 2008, 2015, 2017, 2018)

Keith Guttin is an American college baseball coach who served as the head coach of the Missouri State Bears baseball team from the start of the 1983 season until his retirement in 2024. He has an all-time record of 1,396–929, and, during the 2015 season, he became only the 41st college baseball head coach to win 1,100 games. Under Guttin, the Bears reached the 2003 College World Series.

== Coaching career ==
Guttin is currently 11th in most career victories among active Division I coaches. Over his 30-year career, about 115 of his players signed professional contracts. Several of his former players and support staff have gone on to receive World Series rings from Major League Baseball organizations including: Bill Mueller (Red Sox in 2004), Ryan Howard (Phillies in 2008), Andrew Jefferson (Former pitcher and now a scout for the Giants), and Tyler Onstott (Former video coordinator and now working part-time for the Chicago Cubs).

=== Head coaching record ===
Below is a table of Guttin's yearly records as a collegiate head baseball coach.

Record table
| Season | Team | Overall | Conference | Standing | Postseason |
|---|---|---|---|---|---|
Southwest Missouri State (Independent) (1983)
| 1983 | Southwest Missouri State | 32–11 | | | |
Southwest Missouri State (AMCU/Mid-Con) (1984–1990)
| 1984 | Southwest Missouri State | 35–22 | | 3rd | AMCU Tournament |
| 1985 | Southwest Missouri State | 24–16 | 5–3 | 2nd (Gray) | AMCU Tournament |
| 1986 | Southwest Missouri State | 47–14 | 11–1 | 1st (Gray) | AMCU Tournament |
| 1987 | Southwest Missouri State | 38–14 | 7–3 | 2nd (Gray) | NCAA Regional |
| 1988 | Southwest Missouri State | 41–17 | 12–0 | 1st (Gray) | AMCU Tournament |
| 1989 | Southwest Missouri State | 41–10 | 8–2 | 1st (Gray) | AMCU Tournament |
| 1990 | Southwest Missouri State | 42–15 | 11–0 | 1st (Gray) | Mid-Con Tournament |
| Missouri State: | | | 54–18 | | |
Southwest Missouri State/Missouri State (Missouri Valley Conference) (1991–2024)
| 1991 | Southwest Missouri State | 40–22 | 14–10 | 4th | MVC Tournament |
| 1992 | Southwest Missouri State | 31–23 | 10–11 | 4th | MVC Tournament |
| 1993 | Southwest Missouri State | 32–23 | 14–6 | 2nd | MVC Tournament |
| 1994 | Southwest Missouri State | 31–23 | 13–7 | 2nd | MVC Tournament |
| 1995 | Southwest Missouri State | 37–21 | 18–13 | T-3rd | NCAA Regional |
| 1996 | Southwest Missouri State | 32–25 | 18–11 | 2nd | NCAA Regional 3rd |
| 1997 | Southwest Missouri State | 35–25 | 16–10 | 3rd | NCAA Regional runner-up |
| 1998 | Southwest Missouri State | 32–21 | 19–13 | 3rd | MVC Tournament |
| 1999 | Southwest Missouri State | 38–19 | 18–11 | 2nd | NCAA Regional runner-up |
| 2000 | Southwest Missouri State | 24–33 | 15–17 | T-5th | MVC Tournament |
| 2001 | Southwest Missouri State | 36–22 | 22–10 | 1st | MVC Tournament |
| 2002 | Southwest Missouri State | 43–21 | 19–13 | 3rd | NCAA Regional runner-up |
| 2003 | Southwest Missouri State | 40–26 | 19–11 | 1st | College World Series |
| 2004 | Missouri State | 31–28 | 19–12 | 3rd | MVC Tournament |
| 2005 | Missouri State | 26–29 | 10–14 | T-5th | |
| 2006 | Missouri State | 33–22 | 15–8 | 2nd | MVC Tournament |
| 2007 | Missouri State | 23–34 | 7–17 | T-8th | MVC Tournament |
| 2008 | Missouri State | 40–17 | 18–6 | 2nd | MVC Tournament |
| 2009 | Missouri State | 34–20 | 17–5 | 1st | MVC Tournament |
| 2010 | Missouri State | 21–34 | 6–15 | 8th | MVC Tournament |
| 2011 | Missouri State | 33–23 | 11–9 | 4th | MVC Tournament |
| 2012 | Missouri State | 40–22 | 13–7 | 2nd | NCAA Regional 3rd |
| 2013 | Missouri State | 31–23 | 12–9 | 4th | MVC tournament |
| 2014 | Missouri State | 26–31 | 9–12 | 6th | MVC tournament |
| 2015 | Missouri State | 49–12 | 18–3 | 1st | NCAA Super Regional runner-up |
| 2016 | Missouri State | 38–21 | 7–13 | 7th | MVC tournament |
| 2017 | Missouri State | 43–20 | 18–1 | 1st | NCAA Super Regional runner-up |
| 2018 | Missouri State | 40–17 | 18–3 | 1st | NCAA Regional |
| 2019 | Missouri State | 20–36 | 10–11 | 6th | |
| 2020 | Missouri State | 9–8 | 0–0 | | Season canceled due to COVID-19 |
| 2021 | Missouri State | 21–23 | 11–13 | 5th | MVC tournament |
| 2022 | Missouri State | 31–29 | 8–13 | 6th | NCAA Regional |
| 2023 | Missouri State | 33–23 | 18–9 | 2nd | MVC tournament |
| 2024 | Missouri State | 23–34 | 11–16 | 8th | MVC tournament |
| Missouri State: | | 1,396–929 | 471–339 | | |
| Total: | | 1,396–929 | | | |
National champion Postseason invitational champion Conference regular season champion Conference regular season and conference tournament champion Division regular season champion Division regular season and conference tournament champion Conference tournament champion

== See also ==
- List of college baseball career coaching wins leaders
