= Dan Heefner =

American college baseball coach

Current position
- Title: Head coach
- Team: Dallas Baptist
- Conference: Pac-12
- Record: 725–370–1

Playing career
- 1998–1999: Northern Iowa
- 2000–2001: Olivet Nazarene

Coaching career (HC unless noted)
- 2002–2003: Northern Iowa (asst.)
- 2004: Creighton (asst.)
- 2005–2007: Dallas Baptist (asst.)
- 2008–present: Dallas Baptist

Head coaching record
- Overall: 725–370–1
- Tournaments: NCAA: 25–29; MVC: 18–7; WAC: 2–2; C-USA 10–5

Accomplishments and honors

Championships
- C-USA tournament: (2024); 2 C-USA Regular season: (2023, 2025); 4 MVC tournament: (2014, 2016, 2017, 2021); MVC Regular season: (2016)

Awards
- 2 ABCA Midwest Region Coach of the Year: (2008, 2011); 2 Independent Coach of the Year: (2008, 2009); 2 MVC Coach of the Year: (2016, 2021); 2× C-USA Coach of the Year: (2023, 2024)

Dan Heefner is an American college baseball coach who has been the head coach of Dallas Baptist since the start of the 2008 season. Under Heefner, the Patriots have reached ten NCAA tournaments, including a Super Regional in 2011. An Olivet Nazarene graduate, Heefner played two years of baseball for the Tigers after transferring from Northern Iowa.

== Coaching career ==
=== Northern Iowa ===
Heefner began his coaching career at Northern Iowa (UNI), where he worked under head coach Rick Heller from 2002 to 2003. The Panthers had a 30-win season in 2003 and made the MVC tournament in both seasons. Heefner earned his master's degree from the university in 2003.

=== Creighton ===
After UNI, Heefner spent the 2004 at Creighton under head coach Ed Servais. In Servais' first season as head coach, the team went 35–24 and finished second in the MVC.

=== Dallas Baptist ===
Heefner was named an assistant at independent Dallas Baptist under Eric Newman for the 2005 season. When Newman left to become an assistant at Nebraska after the 2007 season, Heefner was promoted to head coach.

In his first season as head coach, 2008, the Patriots qualified for their first NCAA tournament with a 37–17 regular season. They were the first independent other than Miami (FL) to do so since Cal State Northridge in 1992. As the second seed at the Houston Regional, they went 0–2, losing 9–5 games to Houston and Illinois–Chicago.

The Patriots again made NCAA tournament in 2011 and 2012, both 40-win seasons. They made their deepest run in 2011. As the third seed in the Fort Worth Regional, the team won its opening games against Oklahoma and host TCU to advance to the regional finals. There, it dropped its first game against Oral Roberts but defeated the Eagles in a decisive game seven to advance to the Super Regionals against fellow three seed California. There, the Patriots were swept in two games.

After playing in the Western Athletic Conference in 2013, Dallas Baptist reached the NCAA tournament in 2014, its first season in the Missouri Valley Conference. It went 36–18 (14–7 MVC) in the regular season, tying for second in the conference. It won the MVC tournament, defeating Illinois State in the title game. The Patriots then went 0–2 at the Fort Worth Regional.

== Head coaching record ==
Below is a table of Heefner's yearly records as a collegiate head baseball coach.

Record table
Season	Team	Overall	Conference	Standing	Postseason
Dallas Baptist Patriots (Independent) (2008–2012)
2008	Dallas Baptist	37–19			NCAA Regional
2009	Dallas Baptist	38–17			
2010	Dallas Baptist	28–27			
2011	Dallas Baptist	42–20			NCAA Super Regional
2012	Dallas Baptist	41–19			NCAA Regional
Dallas Baptist Patriots (Western Athletic Conference) (2013)
2013	Dallas Baptist	30–30	13–14	T-7th	WAC tournament
Dallas Baptist Patriots (Missouri Valley Conference) (2014–2022)
2014	Dallas Baptist	40–21	14–7	T-2nd	NCAA Regional
2015	Dallas Baptist	46–15	15–6	2nd	NCAA Regional
2016	Dallas Baptist	44–19	15–5	1st	NCAA Regional
2017	Dallas Baptist	42–21	15–6	2nd	NCAA Regional
2018	Dallas Baptist	42–21	16–5	2nd	NCAA Regional
2019	Dallas Baptist	43–20	14–7	T-1st	NCAA Regional
2020	Dallas Baptist	12–4			Season cancelled on March 12 due to Coronavirus pandemic
2021	Dallas Baptist	41–18	18–6	1st	NCAA Super Regional
2022	Dallas Baptist	34–24–1	11–9–1	3rd	NCAA Regional
Dallas Baptist:			126–54–1		
Dallas Baptist Patriots (Conference USA) (2023–present)
2023	Dallas Baptist	47–16	25–5	1st	NCAA Regional
2024	Dallas Baptist	45–15	17–7	2nd	NCAA Regional
2025	Dallas Baptist	41–18	21–6	1st	NCAA Regional
2026	Dallas Baptist	32-26	19-11	T-2nd	
Dallas Baptist:		725–370–1	82–27		
Total:		725–370–1			
National champion Postseason invitational champion Conference regular season champion Conference regular season and conference tournament champion Division regular season champion Division regular season and conference tournament champion Conference tournament champion

== See also ==
- List of current NCAA Division I baseball coaches
