= 2026 Missouri Valley Conference baseball tournament =

- Teams: 6
- Format: Single-elimination/Double-elimination
- Finals site: Johnny Reagan Field; Murray, Kentucky
- Champions: UIC (1st title)
- Winning coach: Sean McDermott (1st title)
- MVP: Thomas Curry (UIC)
- Television: ESPN+

2026 Missouri Valley Conference baseball standings
	Conf.						Overall
Team	W		L		T	PCT	W		L		T	PCT
UIC ‍†‍‡‍^{y}	16	–	8	–	0	.667	24	–	27	–	1	.471
Indiana State ‍‍‍	15	–	9	–	0	.625	30	–	25	–	0	.545
Murray State ‍‍‍	15	–	9	–	0	.625	30	–	25	–	0	.545
Southern Illinois ‍‍‍	14	–	10	–	0	.583	23	–	30	–	0	.434
Evansville ‍‍‍	13	–	11	–	0	.542	20	–	31	–	0	.392
Illinois State ‍‍‍	13	–	11	–	0	.542	33	–	22	–	0	.600
Belmont ‍‍‍	11	–	13	–	0	.458	21	–	34	–	0	.382
Bradley ‍‍‍	6	–	18	–	0	.250	11	–	45	–	0	.196
Valparaiso ‍‍‍	5	–	19	–	0	.208	12	–	38	–	0	.240
† – Conference champion ‡ – Tournament champion y – Invited to the NCAA Tournament; As of May 17, 2026; Rankings from D1Baseball

The 2026 Missouri Valley Conference baseball tournament will be held from May 20 through 23 at Johnny Reagan Field in Murray, Kentucky. The top six regular season finishers of the conference's 9 teams met in the tournament, with the top 2 teams advancing directly to the double-elimination rounds. The winner of the conference tournament will earn an automatic bid to the 2026 NCAA Division I baseball tournament.

== Seeding and format ==
The league's top six teams were seeded based on conference winning percentage.

== Bracket ==
Upper round 1	Upper round 2	Upper final	Final
Game 4
Game 1	1	UIC	11^{(7)}
3	Murray State	6	4	Southern Illinois	1	Game 7
6	Illinois State	4	1	UIC	6
Game 5	3	Murray State	5
Game 2	3	Murray State	3
4	Southern Illinois	8	2	Indiana State	2
5	Evansville	4
1	UIC	7	–
4	Southern Illinois	2	–
Lower round 1	Lower round 2	Lower round 3	Lower final
Game 9
Game 8	3	Murray State	7
Game 6	2	Indiana State	5	4	Southern Illinois	9
Game 3	5	Evansville	2	4	Southern Illinois	7
6	Illinois State	3	4	Southern Illinois	3
5	Evansville	6

== Schedule ==
Game	Time*	Matchup^{#}	Score	Notes	Reference
Wednesday, May 20
1	11:00 am	No. 4 Southern Illinois vs. No. 5 Evansville	8−4		
2	3:00 pm	No. 3 Murray State vs. No. 6 Illinois State	6−4		
Thursday, May 21
3	11:00 am	No. 6 Illinois State vs No. 5 Evansville	3−6	Illinois State Eliminated	
4	1:45 pm	No. 1 UIC vs No. 4 Southern Illinois	11−1 F/7		
5	5:30 pm	No. 2 Indiana State vs. No. 3 Murray State	2−3		
6	9:15 pm	No. 5 Evansville vs. No. 4 Southern Illinois	2−3	Evansville Eliminated	
Friday, May 22
7	11:00 am	No. 1 UIC vs. No. 3 Murray State	6−5		
8	3:00 pm	No. 2 Indiana State vs. No. 4 Southern Illinois	5−7	Indiana State Eliminated	
9	7:00 pm	No. 3 Murray State vs. No. 4 Southern Illinois	7−9	Murray State Eliminated	
Saturday, May 23
10	3:00 pm	No. 4 Southern Illinois vs. No. 1 UIC	2−7	UIC wins Missouri Valley championship	

== All–Tournament Team ==
Player	Team
Charlie Longmeier	Evansville
Kaiden Jorge	Murray State
Nic Schutte	Murray State
Andrew Evans	Southern Illinois
Meade Johnson	Southern Illinois
Michael Mylott	Southern Illinois
Tim Simay	Southern Illinois
Jake Busson	UIC
**Thomas Curry**	UIC
Will Flanigan	UIC
Mason Lei	UIC
Ashton Kampa	UIC

MVP in bold
