= Jamey Carroll =

American baseball player (born 1974)

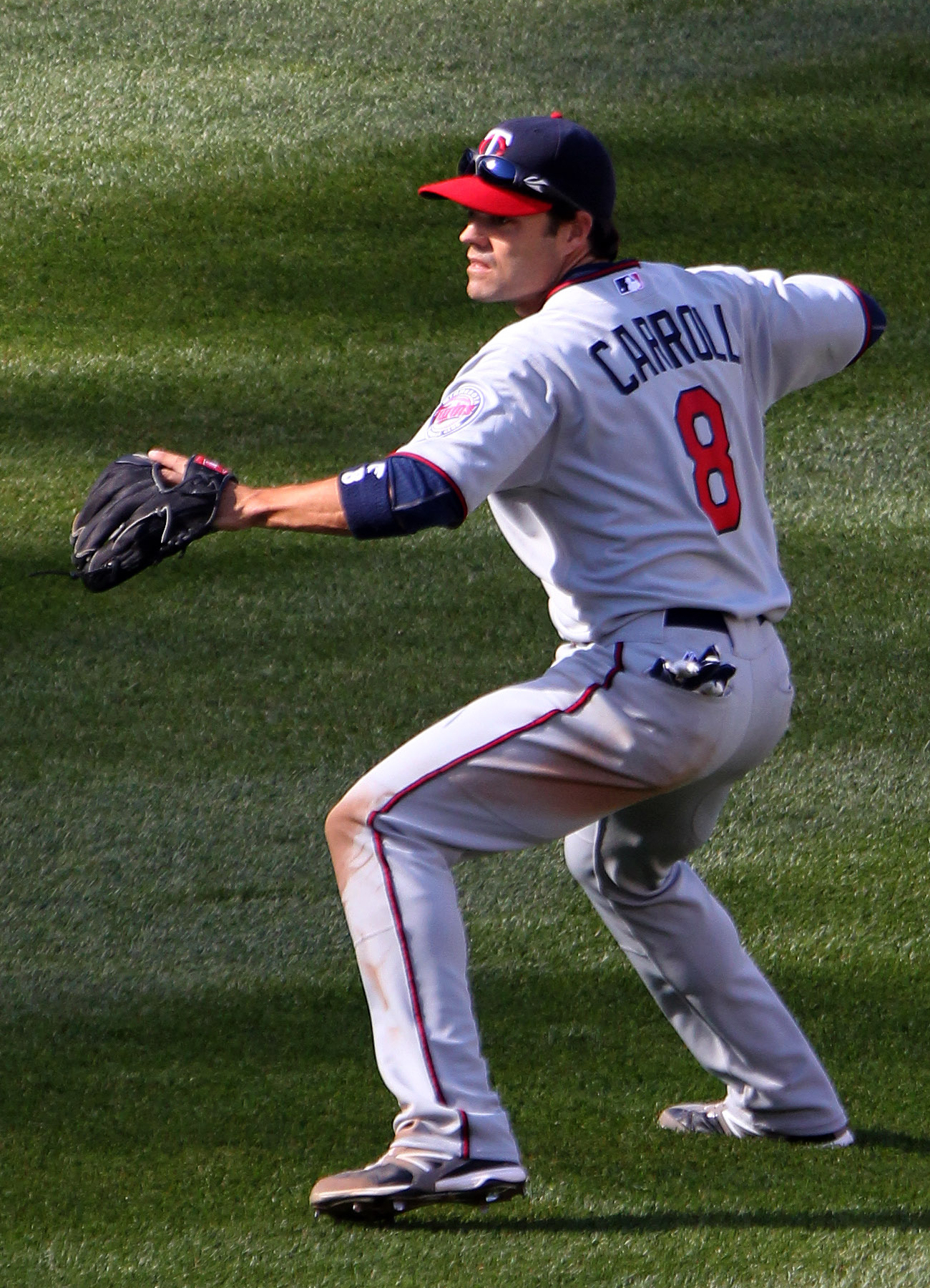
- Carroll with the Minnesota Twins
- Infielder
- Born: February 18, 1974 (age 52); Evansville, Indiana, U.S.
- Batted: Right Threw: Right

MLB debut
- September 11, 2002, for the Montreal Expos

Last MLB appearance
- September 27, 2013, for the Kansas City Royals

MLB statistics
- Batting average: .272
- Home runs: 13
- Runs batted in: 265
- Stats at Baseball Reference

Teams
- Montreal Expos / Washington Nationals (2002–2005); Colorado Rockies (2006–2007); Cleveland Indians (2008–2009); Los Angeles Dodgers (2010–2011); Minnesota Twins (2012–2013); Kansas City Royals (2013)

Jamey Blake Carroll (born February 18, 1974) is an American former professional baseball infielder. He played in Major League Baseball (MLB) for the Montreal Expos/Washington Nationals, Colorado Rockies, Cleveland Indians, Los Angeles Dodgers, Minnesota Twins and Kansas City Royals. He was primarily a second baseman but also spent some time at third base and shortstop.

== Early life and college career ==
Carroll was born in Evansville, Indiana. In 1992, he graduated from Castle High School in Newburgh, Indiana. He attended John A. Logan College and the University of Evansville, where he played college baseball for the Logan Volunteers and Evansville Purple Aces. At Evansville, Carroll was named an All-American.

== Professional career ==
=== Montreal Expos/Washington Nationals ===
The Montreal Expos selected Carroll in the 14th round (400th overall) of the 1996 Major League Baseball draft. After spending parts of the 2000–2002 seasons with the Expos AAA affiliate Ottawa Lynx, Carroll was the second (and final) player in Lynx history to have his number retired by the team. Carroll made his Major League Baseball debut with the Expos on September 11, 2002, against the Chicago Cubs. He played third base and finished 2-for-3 in the game. His first hit was a single to left field in the fourth inning against Alan Benes. In his second game on September 13, Carroll recorded three hits and scored twice in an 11–8 win over the New York Mets. Two days later, he hit his first major league home run off Mets pitcher Tyler Walker in a 10–1 win. Carroll played in 16 games to close the season with the Expos, and hit .310 with five doubles, three triples, a home run and 6 RBI.

Carroll spent the entire 2003 season with the Expos, batting .260 with a home run and 10 RBI in 105 games. He made 67 appearances at third base, 14 at shortstop, and 11 at second base.

On October 3, 2004, Carroll scored the last run for the Expos franchise, as they relocated to Washington, D.C. the following season. Carroll was also the on-deck batter when Endy Chávez made the final out in Expos history at Shea Stadium. Carroll batted .289 with 14 doubles, two triples, and 16 RBI in 102 games during the 2004 season.

Carroll hit .251 with eight doubles, a triple and 22 RBI in 113 games with the Nationals in 2005.

=== Colorado Rockies ===
On February 11, 2006, Carroll was traded to the Colorado Rockies for cash considerations.

Carroll posted the best season of his career in 2006, finishing with a .300 batting average, five home runs, 36 RBI, and 10 stolen bases in 136 games. He also hit particularly well at Coors Field, finishing with a .375 clip in Denver compared to the .220 mark he amassed on the road. He played third base, shortstop, and second base, seeing by far the most action at second, where he appeared 109 times and made 102 starts. He committed just three errors as a second baseman, and five overall. Carroll led all National League second basemen in fielding percentage with a .995 mark.

On January 4, 2007, Carroll signed a two-year, $4 million contract extension with the Rockies. The deal included a club option for 2009. On August 11, 2007, Carroll hit his first career grand slam as a pinch hitter against Chicago Cubs' pitcher Rich Hill in the sixth inning to break a 2–2 tie. He also made a key defensive play in the seventh, where with the bases loaded Cubs' outfielder Matt Murton hit a high chopper that Carroll snatched before throwing it to first, getting Murton and stranding all three baserunners. The Rockies won that game, 15–2, as Carroll finished the game 1-for-2 with two runs and 5 RBI.

On October 1, Carroll won the NL Wild Card tie-breaker game for the Rockies with a sacrifice fly that scored Matt Holliday. This gave the Rockies a 9–8, 13-inning victory over the San Diego Padres. Later dubbed Rocktober, the team made it all the way to the 2007 World Series before being swept by the Boston Red Sox. Carroll batted .225 with two home runs and 22 RBI in 108 regular season games, and made four appearances in the postseason, going 0-for-2 with a walk.

=== Cleveland Indians ===
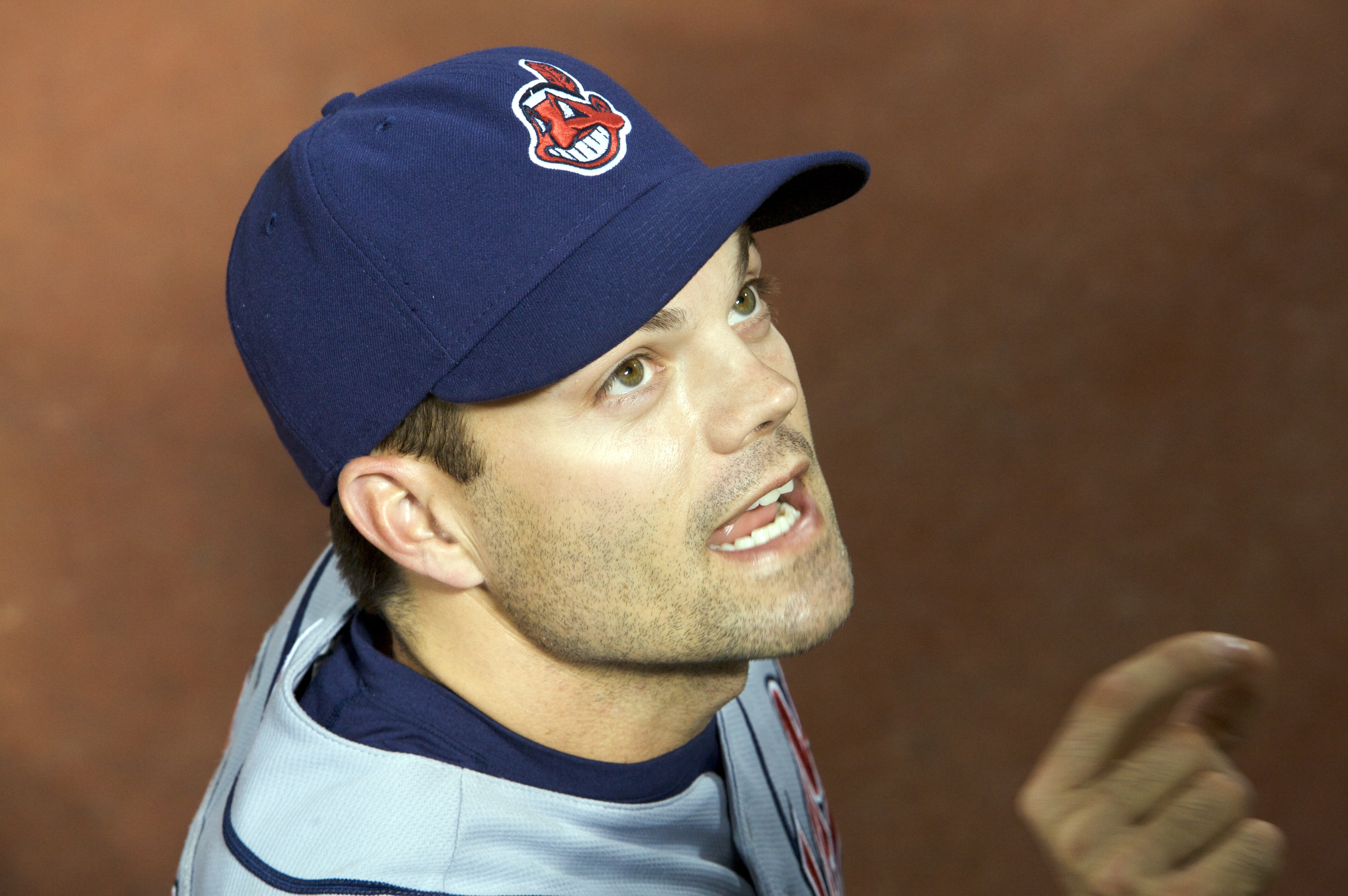
Carroll with the Indians

On December 7, 2007, Carroll was traded to the Cleveland Indians for a player to be named later. Rockies general manager Dan O'Dowd explained the need to shrink depth on the roster and free up money for other positions, making Carroll a target for a trade. The PTBNL would be minor league pitcher Sean Smith.

In 2008, Carroll batted .277 with a home run and 36 RBI in 113 games with Cleveland. The Indians picked up his club option for 2009 on October 16. In Cleveland's final spring training game on April 4, 2009, Carroll was hit on the hand by a pitch from Houston Astros pitcher Doug Brocail, resulting in a fracture of the fifth metacarpal in his left hand. He was placed on the disabled list on April 6. On May 12, Carroll was activated after a rehab assignment with the Triple-A Columbus Clippers. For the 2009 season, he batted .276 with two home runs and 26 RBI in 93 games.

=== Los Angeles Dodgers ===
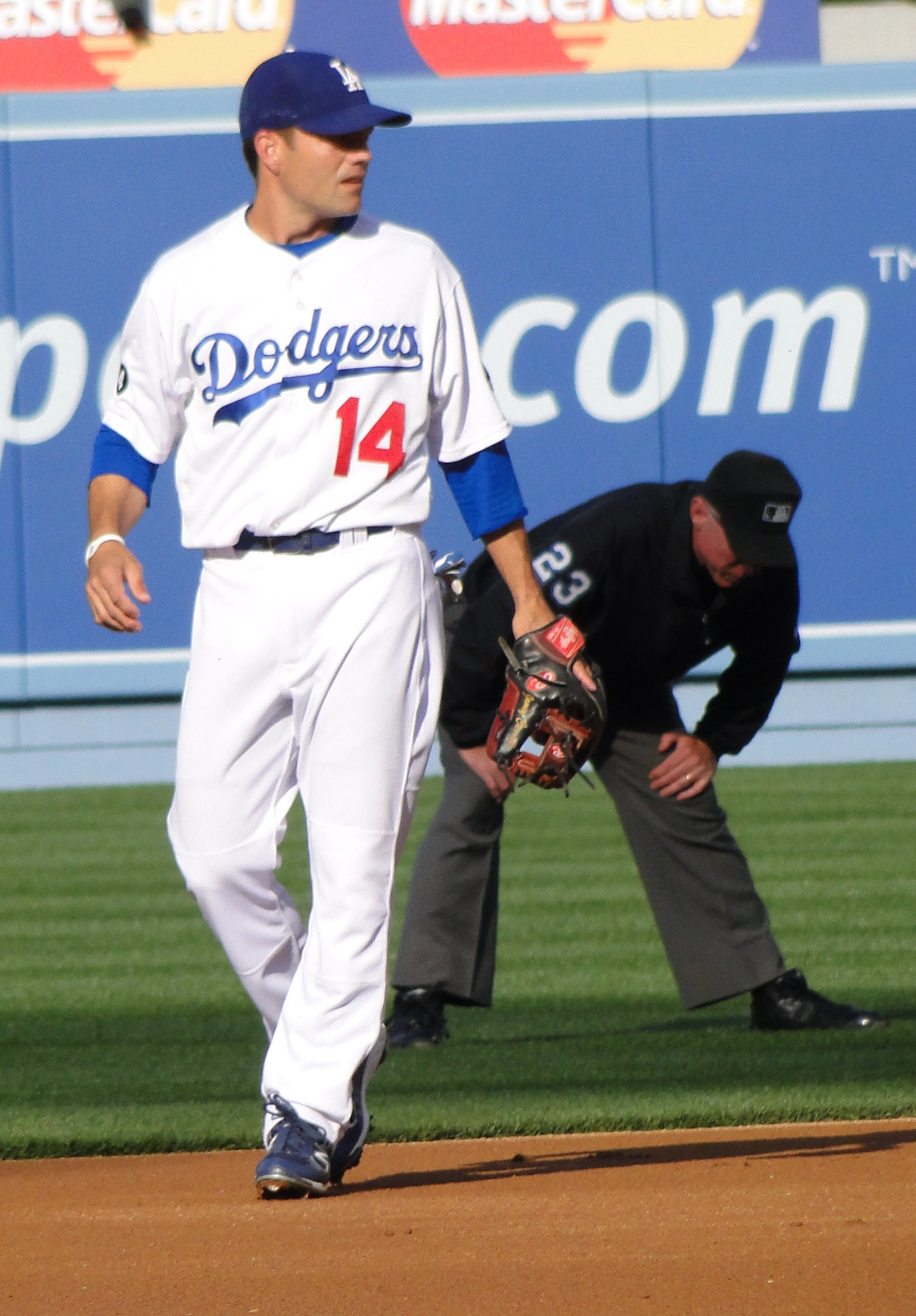
Jamey Carroll with the Dodgers, 2011

On December 16, 2009, Carroll signed a two-year, $3.85 million contract with the Los Angeles Dodgers. He saw extended action at shortstop in 2010 due to injuries to Rafael Furcal. He appeared in 133 games with the Dodgers, hitting .291 with 15 doubles, 23 RBI and a career-high 12 stolen bases. Due to continuing injury problems among the other infielders in 2011, Carroll appeared in a career high 146 games and hit .290 with 17 RBI. His RBI total tied with Dave Roberts and Tony Smith for the fewest ever by a Dodger with at least 400 plate appearances and put him in third place in Major League history in that category. He became a free agent after the season.

=== Minnesota Twins ===
Carroll signed with a two-year, $6.75 million contract with the Minnesota Twins on November 15, 2011. He collected his first hits as a Twin on April 11, 2012, including the game-winner that capped a comeback win over the Los Angeles Angels.

Carroll was thrown out of a game for the first time in his career on May 25, 2012. He was ejected by umpire Alan Porter after Porter called him out at first base. Later, Carroll claimed that, "Tie goes to the runner." On September 4, Carroll hit his first home run since 2009 in a 4–2 loss to the Chicago White Sox, snapping a stretch of 1,384 at bats without a home run. He finished the season batting .268 with a home run and a career-high 40 RBI in 138 games.

On August 5, 2013, with the Twins trailing 13–0 in the eighth inning to the Kansas City Royals, Carroll became the tenth Twins position player to pitch in a game. He faced three batters and retired all three, throwing only nine pitches, seven of them strikes. Carroll hit .230 with 9 RBI in 58 games with Minnesota in 2013.

=== Kansas City Royals ===
On August 11, 2013, Carroll was traded to the Kansas City Royals for a player to be named later or cash. He hit .111 with three doubles and 2 RBI in 14 games with Kansas City. On October 11, 2013, the Royals outrighted him to the minor leagues, but he declined the assignment and became a free agent.

=== Return to Washington Nationals ===
On January 9, 2014, Carroll signed a minor league contract with the Washington Nationals. He was released on March 25.

=== Pittsburgh Pirates Front Office ===
On January 12, 2015, the Pittsburgh Pirates announced that Carroll would be joining their front office as a special assistant. This was cited by some sources as his official retirement as a player. On January 5, 2022, it was announced that Carroll would be leaving the Pirates organization after seven years in the position.

== Personal life ==
On February 28, 2008, Carroll's wife Kim gave birth to fraternal twins. His brother Wes Carroll is the head coach at Evansville. Jamey and Wes appeared in spring training games together with the Washington Nationals.

He resides in Rockledge, Florida.
