= 2011 Missouri Valley Conference baseball tournament =

Baseball tournament

- Teams: 8
- Format: Double-elimination
- Finals site: TD Ameritrade Park; Omaha, NE
- Champions: Creighton (2nd title)
- Winning coach: Ed Servais (2nd title)
- MVP: Jonas Dufek (Creighton)
- Attendance: Total: 37,607; Avg: 2,507

2011 Missouri Valley Conference baseball standings
	Conf.				Overall
Team	W		L	PCT	W		L	PCT
Creighton ‍†‍‡‍^{y}	15	–	6	.714	45	–	16	.738
Wichita State ‍‍‍	14	–	7	.667	39	–	26	.600
Illinois State ‍‍‍	13	–	8	.619	36	–	18	.667
Missouri State ‍‍‍	11	–	9	.550	33	–	23	.589
Southern Illinois ‍‍‍	11	–	10	.524	23	–	34	.404
Indiana State ‍‍‍	8	–	13	.381	29	–	28	.509
Evansville ‍‍‍	7	–	13	.350	28	–	25	.528
Bradley ‍‍‍	4	–	17	.190	22	–	32	.407
† – Conference champion ‡ – Tournament champion y – Invited to the 2011 NCAA Division I baseball tournament As of April 19, 2020; Rankings from Coaches' Poll

The 2011 Missouri Valley Conference baseball tournament took place from May 24 through 28. All eight teams met in the double-elimination tournament held at Creighton's TD Ameritrade Park Omaha in Omaha, Nebraska. Creighton won their second tournament championship and earned the conference's automatic bid to the 2011 NCAA Division I baseball tournament.

== Seeding and format ==
The league's eight teams were seeded based on conference winning percentage. They then played a two bracket, double-elimination format tournament, with the winner of each bracket then playing a single elimination final.

Team	W	L	PCT	GB	Seed
Creighton	15	6	.714	–	1
Wichita State	14	7	.667	1	2
Illinois State	13	8	.619	2	3
Missouri State	11	9	.550	3.5	4
Southern Illinois	11	10	.524	4	5
Indiana State	8	13	.381	6.5	6
Evansville	7	13	.350	8	7
Bradley	4	17	.190	11	8

== Results ==
First round
3	Illinois State	2
6	Indiana State	5
2	Wichita State	2
7	Evansville	1
3	Illinois State	4^{11}
7	Evansville	3
4	Missouri State	6
5	Southern Illinois	4
1	Creighton	4
8	Bradley	1
5	Southern Illinois	5
8	Bradley	1

Second round
6	Indiana State	3
2	Wichita State	7
6	Indiana State	5
3	Illinois State	2
4	Missouri State	10
1	Creighton	3
1	Creighton	5
5	Southern Illinois	0

Semifinals
2	Wichita State	6	9
6	Indiana State	7	0
4	Missouri State	0	5
1	Creighton	5	6^{12}

Finals
2	Wichita State	1
1	Creighton	3

Bracket:

== Box scores ==
May 24, 2011 9:00 am (CDT) at TD Ameritrade Park in Omaha, Nebraska 64 °F (18 °C)
Team	1	2	3	4	5	6	7	8	9	R	H	E
(6) Indiana State (1–0)	2	0	0	1	0	0	0	2	0	5	7	1
(3) Illinois State (0–1)	0	1	0	0	0	0	0	0	1	2	3	2
WP: Colin Rea (8–4) LP: Corey Maines (9–4) Sv: Blake Drake (8); Attendance: 1,931; Boxscore

May 24, 2011 3:10 pm (CDT) at TD Ameritrade Park in Omaha, Nebraska 69 °F (21 °C)
Team	1	2	3	4	5	6	7	8	9	R	H	E
(7) Evansville (0–1)	0	0	0	0	0	0	1	0	0	1	10	0
(2) Wichita State (1–0)	1	0	0	1	0	0	0	0	0	2	4	1
WP: Lowell (10–4) LP: Elam (7–4) Sv: Elam (5); Attendance: 1,931; Boxscore

May 24, 2011 6:15 pm (CDT) at TD Ameritrade Park in Omaha, Nebraska 74 °F (23 °C)
Team	1	2	3	4	5	6	7	8	9	R	H	E
(5) Southern Illinois (0–1)	0	0	1	0	1	1	0	0	1	4	10	0
(4) Missouri State (1–0)	0	0	3	1	0	1	1	0	x	6	14	2
WP: Nick Petree (9–2) LP: Cody Forsythe (8–5) Sv: Pierce Johnson (2); Home runs: SIL: None; MOST: Conway (3), Paxson (2); Attendance: 1,931; Boxscore

May 25, 2011 9:00 am (CDT) at TD Ameritrade Park in Omaha, Nebraska 65 °F (18 °C)
Team	1	2	3	4	5	6	7	8	9	R	H	E
(8) Bradley (0–1)	0	0	0	0	1	0	0	0	0	1	6	1
(1) Creighton (1–0)	2	0	1	0	0	0	1	0	x	4	5	0
WP: Jonas Dufek (10–1) LP: Joe Bircher (6–6) Sv: Kurt Spomer (11); Home runs: BRAD: None; CRE: Mutcheson (2); Attendance: 1,931; Boxscore

May 25, 2011 11:40 am (CDT) at TD Ameritrade Park in Omaha, Nebraska 61 °F (16 °C)
Team	1	2	3	4	5	6	7	8	9	10	11	R	H	E
(3) Illinois State (1–1)	1	0	2	0	0	0	0	0	0	0	1	4	6	0
(7) Evansville (0–2)	1	0	0	0	1	0	1	0	0	0	0	3	6	3
WP: Kenny Long (4–1) LP: Peter Spear (0–1); Attendance: 1,364; Boxscore

May 25, 2011 3:45 pm (CDT) at TD Ameritrade Park in Omaha, Nebraska 55 °F (13 °C)
Team	1	2	3	4	5	6	7	8	9	R	H	E
(5)Southern Illinois (1–1)	1	0	4	0	0	0	0	0	0	5	10	0
(8) Bradley (0–2)	0	0	0	0	0	0	0	1	0	1	8	2
WP: Cameron Maldonado (5–7) LP: John Nasshan (3–8); Attendance: 1,364; Boxscore

May 25, 2011 6:30 pm (CDT) at TD Ameritrade Park in Omaha, Nebraska 73 °F (23 °C)
Team	1	2	3	4	5	6	7	8	9	R	H	E
(2) Wichita State (2–0)	0	0	1	0	3	0	1	2	0	7	5	0
(6) Indiana State (1–1)	2	0	0	0	1	0	0	0	0	3	7	5
WP: Brian Flynn (6–4) LP: Sean Manaea (5–5) Sv: T. J. McGreevy (3); Home runs: WSU: O'Brien (10); IDS: None; Attendance: 1,364; Boxscore

May 25, 2011 9:40 pm (CDT) at TD Ameritrade Park in Omaha, Nebraska 54 °F (12 °C)
Team	1	2	3	4	5	6	7	8	9	R	H	E
(4) Missouri State (2–0)	0	0	5	0	0	0	5	0	0	10	13	1
(1) Creighton (1–1)	0	2	0	0	0	0	0	1	0	3	10	1
WP: Blake Barber (8–4) LP: Ty Blach (10–2); Attendance: 1,364; Boxscore

May 26, 2011 9:00 am (CDT) at TD Ameritrade Park in Omaha, Nebraska 50 °F (10 °C)
Team	1	2	3	4	5	6	7	8	9	R	H	E
(3) Illinois State (1–2)	1	0	0	0	5	0	0	0	0	6	7	3
(6) Indiana State (2–1)	2	0	2	2	0	0	0	1	x	7	9	0
WP: Reggie Hochstedler (4–1) LP: Cam Verbeke (0–2) Sv: Blake Drake (10); Home runs: ILS: McNeely (12); INS: None; Attendance: 3,213; Boxscore

May 26, 2011 12:45 pm (CDT) at TD Ameritrade Park in Omaha, Nebraska 62 °F (17 °C)
Team	1	2	3	4	5	6	7	8	9	R	H	E
(1) Creighton (2–1)	0	0	0	0	1	1	0	2	1	5	9	0
(5) Southern Illinois (1–2)	0	0	0	0	0	0	0	0	0	0	2	2
WP: Greg Hellhake (4–4) LP: Andrew Bever (5–6); Attendance: 3,213; Boxscore

May 26, 2011 4:00 pm (CDT) at TD Ameritrade Park in Omaha, Nebraska 66 °F (19 °C)
Team	1	2	3	4	5	6	7	8	9	R	H	E
(6) Indiana State (3–1)	0	3	0	0	0	3	0	1	0	7	9	3
(2) Wichita State (2–1)	0	0	0	3	0	0	0	0	3	6	12	2
WP: Chris Machado (5–3) LP: Josh Smith (7–4); Home runs: INS: None; WSU: Coy (7); Attendance: 3,213; Boxscore

May 26, 2011 4:00 pm (CDT) at TD Ameritrade Park in Omaha, Nebraska 66 °F (19 °C)
Team	1	2	3	4	5	6	7	8	9	R	H	E
(1) Creighton (3–1)	0	1	0	0	2	1	1	1	0	6	8	1
(4) Missouri State (2–1)	2	1	0	0	2	0	0	0	0	5	11	4
WP: Reese McGraw (6–1) LP: Pierce Johnson (6–5) Sv: Kurt Spomer (12); Attendance: 3,213; Boxscore

May 27, 2011 12:30 pm (CDT) at TD Ameritrade Park in Omaha, Nebraska 73 °F (23 °C)
Team	1	2	3	4	5	6	7	8	9	R	H	E
(2) Wichita State (3–1)	4	3	0	0	0	0	02	0	0	9	13	0
(6) Indiana State (3–2)	0	0	0	0	0	0	0	0	0	0	4	1
WP: Zach Beringer (3–3) LP: Kurt Kudrecki (1–2) Sv: Albert Minnis (1); Attendance: 2,318; Boxscore

May 27, 2011 4:00 pm (CDT) at TD Ameritrade Park in Omaha, Nebraska 60 °F (16 °C)
Team	1	2	3	4	5	6	7	8	9	10	11	12	R	H	E
(4) Missouri State (2–2)	0	0	0	1	0	2	0	0	0	0	0	0	3	9	0
(1) Creighton (4–1)	3	0	0	0	0	0	0	0	0	0	0	1	4	7	0
WP: Erik Mattingly (1–0) LP: Dan Kickham (2–3); Attendance: 2,318; Boxscore

May 28, 2011 7:00 pm (CDT) at TD Ameritrade Park in Omaha, Nebraska 74 °F (23 °C)
Team	1	2	3	4	5	6	7	8	9	R	H	E
(1) Creighton (5–1)	2	0	0	0	1	0	0	0	0	3	6	0
(2) Wichita State (3–2)	0	0	0	0	0	0	0	1	0	1	4	1
WP: Jonas Dufek (11–1) LP: Charlie Lowell (10–5) Sv: Kurt Spomer (13); Attendance: 6,939; Boxscore

== All-Tournament Team ==
The following players were named to the All-Tournament Team.

POS	Name	School
C	Chris O'Brien	Wichita State
1B	Brock Chaffin	Missouri State
2B	Kevin Medrano	Missouri State
SS	Tyler Wampler	Indiana State
3B	Brent Seifert	Missouri State
UT	Cody Fick	Evansville
OF	Don Lambert	Wichita State
OF	Aaron Conway	Missouri State
OF	Clay Cuno	Creighton
OF	Trevor Adams	Creighton
P	J. C. Casey	Missouri State
P	Jonas Dufek	Creighton
P	Greg Hellhake	Creighton

=== Most Outstanding Player ===
Creighton pitcher Jonas Dufek was named Most Outstanding Player.
