= Dewey Kalmer =

Dewey Kalmer is a retired college baseball coach who spent the majority of his coaching career as the head coach at Bradley University. Kalmer retired with a 1,032-914-5 (.530) record in 40 overall seasons as a head coach.

== Bradley University ==
Kalmer was one of the most successful coaches in Bradley sports history. During his tenure, Bradley sent approximately 65 players to play professional baseball, including seven players to the MLB. Kalmer was one of the first college baseball coaches to place a player on the USA Baseball Olympic Team as All-American pitcher Mike Dunne was a member of the 1984 squad in Los Angeles. At the time of his retirement, Kalmer's 842 wins at Bradley represented exactly one-half of the 1,684 wins in the program's 108-year history.
