= 2022 Missouri Valley Conference baseball tournament =

- Teams: 8
- Format: Double-elimination
- Finals site: Hammons Field; Springfield, Missouri
- Champions: Missouri State (5th title)
- Winning coach: Keith Guttin (5th title)
- MVP: Mason Greer (Missouri State)
- Television: ESPN+

2022 Missouri Valley Conference baseball standings
	Conf.						Overall
Team	W		L		T	PCT	W		L		T	PCT
Southern Illinois ‍†‍‍	16	–	5	–	0	.762	44	–	16	–	0	.733
Evansville ‍‍‍	14	–	6	–	0	.700	32	–	24	–	0	.571
Dallas Baptist ‍‍‍^{y}	11	–	9	–	1	.548	34	–	22	–	1	.605
Bradley ‍‍‍	11	–	10	–	0	.524	20	–	29	–	0	.408
Indiana State ‍‍‍	10	–	10	–	1	.500	26	–	22	–	1	.541
Missouri State ‍‍‡‍^{y}	8	–	13	–	0	.381	30	–	27	–	0	.526
Illinois State ‍‍‍	7	–	14	–	0	.333	20	–	31	–	0	.392
Valparaiso ‍‍‍	5	–	15	–	0	.250	16	–	32	–	0	.333
† – Conference champion ‡ – Tournament champion y – Invited to the NCAA tournament Rankings from D1Baseball

The 2022 Missouri Valley Conference baseball tournament was held from May 24 through 29. All eight baseball-sponsoring schools in the conference participated in the double-elimination tournament held at Missouri State's Hammons Field in Springfield, Missouri. The winner of the tournament earned the conference's automatic bid to the 2022 NCAA Division I baseball tournament.

== Seeding and format ==
The league's eight teams was seeded based on conference winning percentage. The four lowest seeds participated in a play-in round with the winners advancing to a six-team double-elimination bracket.

== Results ==
Play-in round

Team	1	2	3	4	5	6	7	8	9	R	H	E
8 Valparaiso	0	0	0	0	0	0	0	0	0	0	1	3
5 Indiana State	1	0	0	4	2	1	0	0	X	8	8	0
WP: Matt Jachec (9–2) LP: Colin Fields (4–7); Boxscore

Team	1	2	3	4	5	6	7	8	9	R	H	E
7 Illinois State	0	0	0	0	4	0	0	0	0	4	9	0
6 Missouri State	0	0	2	0	1	2	2	2	X	9	11	0
WP: Riyan Rodriguez (3–0) LP: Jared Hart (2–3); Boxscore

Double-elimination round

First round
1	Southern Illinois	1
6	Missouri State	5
2	Evansville	9
5	Indiana State	1
3	Dallas Baptist	4
4	Bradley	3

Second round
6	Missouri State	19
4	Bradley	3
2	Evansville	21
3	Dallas Baptist	2
1	Southern Illinois	8
5	Indiana State	2

Third round
6	Missouri State	7
2	Evansville	6
3	Dallas Baptist	5
1	Southern Illinois	7

Semifinals
2	Evansville	5
1	Southern Illinois	8

Final
6	Missouri State	6	13
1	Southern Illinois	9	3

== Schedule ==
Game	Time*	Matchup^{#}	Score
First Round - Single Elimination
Tuesday, May 24
1	1:30 p.m.	No. 6 Missouri State vs. No. 7 Illinois State Elimination Game	5-1
Wednesday, May 25
2	2:30 p.m.	No. 5 Indiana State vs. No. 8 Valparaiso Elimination Game	8-0
Second Round - Double Elimination - Wednesday, May 25
3	5:52 p.m.	No. 1 Southern Illinois vs. No. 6 Missouri State	1-5
4	9:15 p.m.	No. 2 Evansville vs. No. 5 Indiana State	9-1
Thursday, May 26
5	7:30 p.m.	No. 3 Dallas Baptist vs. No. 4 Bradley	4-3
Third Round - Friday, May 27
6	11:00 a.m.	No. 1 Southern Illinois vs. No. 5 Indiana State Elimination Game	8-2
7	3:00 p.m.	No. 6 Missouri State vs. No. 4 Bradley	19-3
8	7:00 p.m.	No. 2 Evansville vs. No. 3 Dallas Baptist	21-2
Saturday, May 28
9	11:00 a.m.	No. 1 Southern Illinois vs. No. 3 Dallas Baptist Elimination Game	7-5
10	3:00 p.m.	No. 6 Missouri State vs. No. 2 Evansville	7-6
11	7:00 p.m.	No. 1 Southern Illinois vs. No. 2 Evansville Elimination Game	8-5
Championship - Sunday, May 29
12	12:00 p.m.	No. 6 Missouri State vs. No. 1 Southern Illinois	6-9
13	3:32 pm	No. 6 Missouri State vs. No. 1 Southern Illinois Elimination Game	13-3
*Game times in CDT. # – Rankings denote tournament seed.
