= 2010 Missouri Valley Conference baseball tournament =

- Teams: 8
- Format: Double-elimination
- Finals site: Eck Stadium; Wichita, Kansas
- Champions: Illinois State (2nd title)
- Winning coach: Mark Kingston (1st title)
- MVP: Kevin Tokarski (Illinois State)

The 2010 Missouri Valley Conference baseball tournament took place May 25–29. All eight teams met in the double-elimination tournament held at Wichita State's Eck Stadium - Tyler Field in Wichita, Kansas. Illinois State won their second tournament championship and earned the conference's automatic bid to the 2010 NCAA Division I baseball tournament.

== Seeding and format ==
The league's eight teams were seeded based on conference winning percentage. They then played a two bracket, double-elimination format tournament, with the winner of each bracket then playing a single elimination final.

== Results ==
First round
3	Indiana State	8
6	Creighton	7^{10}
2	Illinois State	3
7	Bradley	0
6	Creighton	6
7	Bradley	5^{12}
4	Southern Illinois	4
5	Evansville	11
1	Wichita State	6
8	Missouri State	2
4	Southern Illinois	10
8	Missouri State	14

Second round
3	Indiana State	5
2	Illinois State	10
3	Indiana State	9
6	Creighton	7
5	Evansville	2
1	Wichita State	9
5	Evansville	7
8	Missouri State	2

Semifinals
2	Illinois State	9
3	Indiana State	4
1	Wichita State	6
5	Evansville	5

Finals
2	Illinois State	17
1	Wichita State	8

== All-Tournament Team ==
The following players were named to the All-Tournament Team.

POS	Name	School
C	Matt Mirabel	Illinois State
1B	Zack Amrein	Illinois State
2B	Kevin Tokarski	Illinois State
SS	Eric Stamets	Evansville
3B	Cody Fick	Evansville
UT	Kevin Medrano	Missouri State
UT	Ryan Court	Illinois State
DH	Evan Kohli	Illinois State
OF	Bret Bascue	Wichita State
OF	Greg Wallace	Evansville
OF	Trever Adams	Creighton
P	Tim Kelley	Wichita State
P	Kenny Long	Illinois State

=== Most Outstanding Player ===
Illinois State second baseman Kevin Tokarski was named Most Outstanding Player.
