= Horner Ballpark =

Baseball field in Dallas, Texas

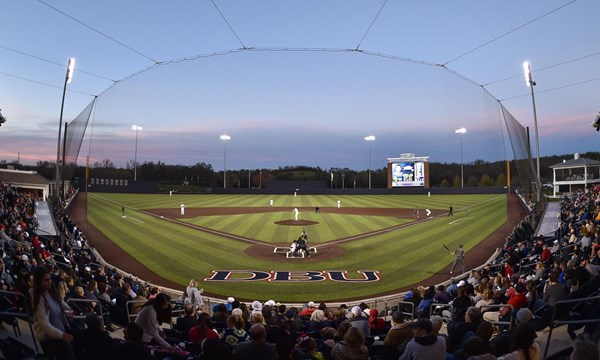
- Interactive map of Horner Ballpark
- Address: 3000 Mountain Creek Pkwy; Dallas, TX; U.S.
- Coordinates: 32.7116°N 96.9455°W
- Owner: Dallas Baptist University
- Operator: Dallas Baptist Athletics
- Capacity: 3,492
- Type: Ballpark
- Surface: Astroturf
- Scoreboard: Yes
- Record attendance: 3,242 (vs. Texas; May 31, 2015)
- Field size: Left Field: 330 ft (100 m); Center Field: 390 ft (120 m); Right Field: 330 ft (100 m)
- Current use: Baseball

Construction
- Opened: February 15, 2013; 13 years ago

Tenant
- Dallas Baptist Patriots baseball (NCAA DI) (2013-present)

Website
- dbupatriots.com/horner-ballpark

Horner Ballpark is a ballpark in Dallas, Texas. It is the home park of the Dallas Baptist Patriots baseball team of the NCAA Division I Pac-12 Conference. It opened on February 15, 2013, and has been highly acclaimed by national media, including D1Baseball.com.

The stadium is named for Joan and Andy Horner, who made the lead donation for the park. The Patriots hosted the Dallas Regional in 2015 at Horner Ballpark.

The ballpark succeeded Patriot Field as the home of Dallas Baptist baseball team.

Horner Ballpark received a new scoreboard manufactured by Daktronics prior to the start of the 2018 season.

Horner Ballpark hosted the 2018 Missouri Valley Conference baseball tournament, with Missouri State defeating the Patriots 7–6 in the championship game.

The ballpark's (and the university's) location adjacent to the Dallas-Fort Worth National Cemetery has led to a unique tradition during evening ball games: at 7PM local time, when "Taps" is played at the Cemetery, the game will stop and all in attendance will face the American flag in remembrance of those buried there.

== See also ==
- List of NCAA Division I baseball venues
