= Route 66 Stadium =

Baseball park at Springfield, Missouri, U.S.

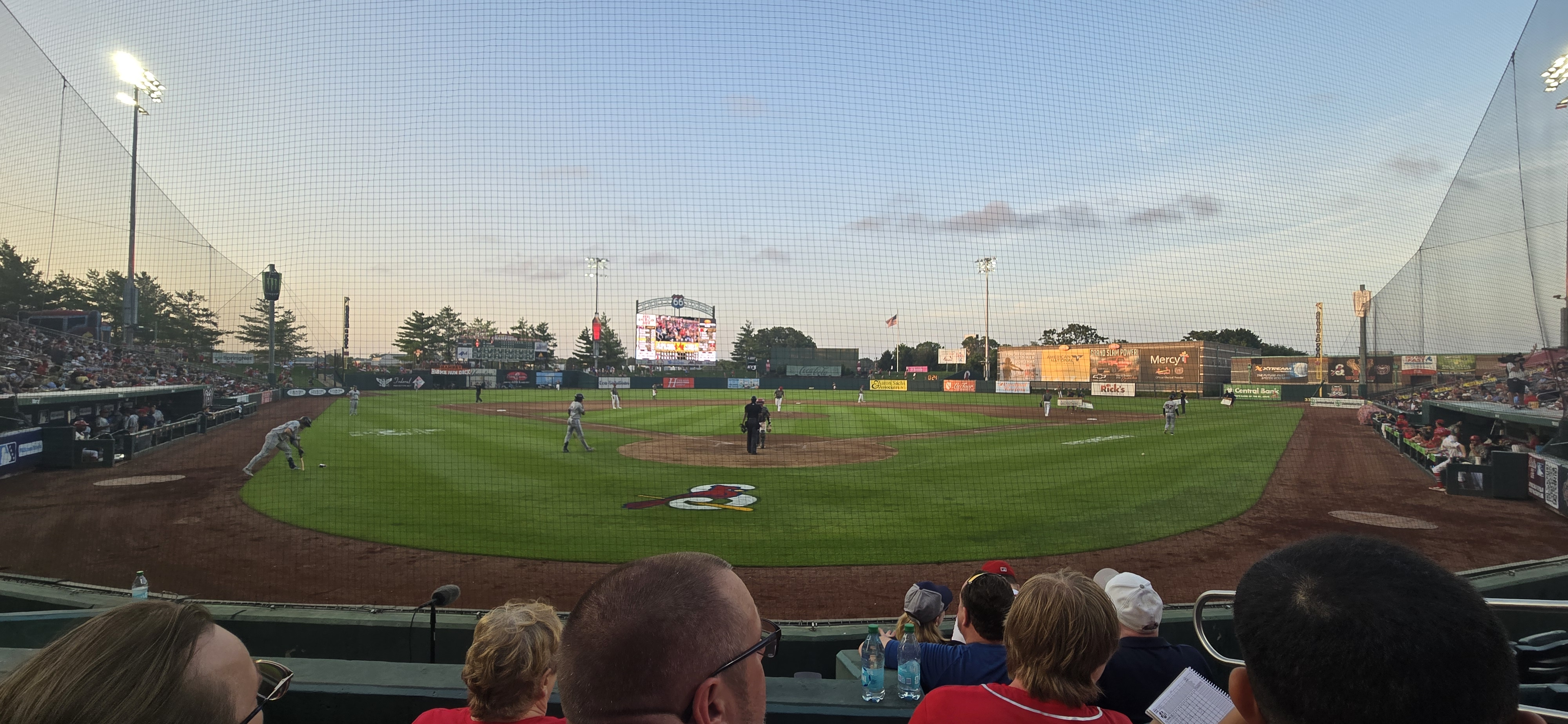
- Route 66 Stadium in 2026

- Location within Missouri Location within the United States
- Interactive map of Route 66 Stadium
- Former names: Hammons Field (2004–2026)
- Address: 955 East Trafficway; Springfield, Missouri
- Coordinates: 37°12′40″N 93°16′47″W
- Owner: The City of Springfield
- Operator: The City of Springfield Industries
- Capacity: 10,486 (7,986 seats plus 2,500 general admission)
- Surface: Grass
- Field size: Left Field: 315 feet (96.0 m); Left-Center: 365 feet (111.3 m); Center Field: 400 feet (122.0 m); Right-Center: 365 feet (111.3 m); Right Field: 330 feet (100.6 m)
- Public transit: Springfield Transit Services

Construction
- Groundbreaking: July 17, 2002
- Opened: April 2, 2004
- Cost: $32 million ($54.5 million in 2025 dollars)
- Architects: CDFM2; Pellham-Phillips-Hagerman
- Structural engineers: Wells & Scaletty
- General contractor: Killian Construction Co.

Tenants
- Ozarks Springbirds (TL) 2005–present Missouri State Bears (NCAA) 2004–present Missouri Valley Conference baseball tournament 2004, 2007, 2012, 2022

Route 66 Stadium (formerly Hammons Field) is a minor league baseball stadium located in Springfield, Missouri, with a capacity of 7,986 plus approximately 2,500 general admission seating. Completed in April 2004, it is home to the Ozarks Springbirds, the Texas League affiliate of the St. Louis Cardinals, as well as the Missouri State University Bears baseball team.

== History ==
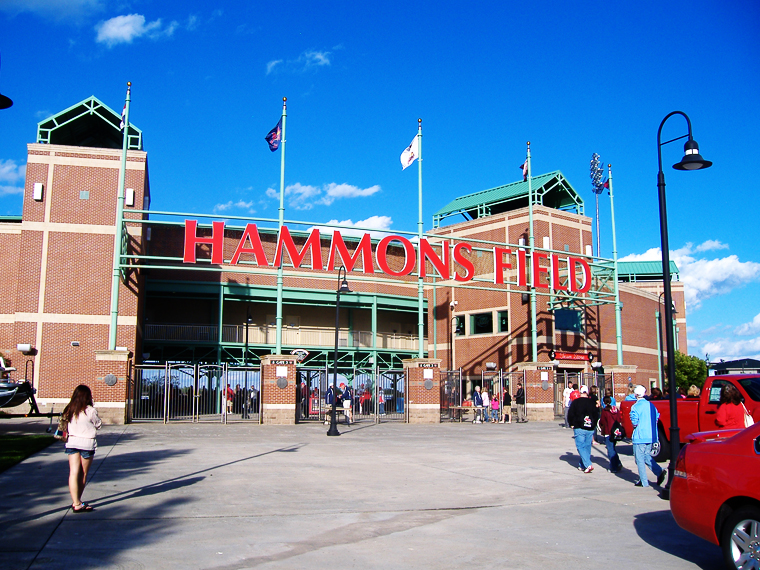
The then Hammons Field in 2011

The facility, funded entirely by local businessman, hotel mogul and benefactor John Q. Hammons, is the centerpiece of the midtown development project, Jordan Valley Park, on the corner of Sherman Avenue and Trafficway Boulevard. Hammons built the ballpark before he had a minor league team secured to play in the stadium, though he steadfastly assured local residents it would be the Double-A affiliate of the St. Louis Cardinals. He was ultimately able to persuade the Cardinals to purchase the El Paso Diablos franchise of the Texas League from the Brett Bros. and relocate it to Springfield. They became the Springfield Cardinals soon thereafter when the parent club ended its brief two-year affiliation with the Tennessee Smokies of the Southern League.

In February 2023, the city of Springfield purchased Hammons Field and its surrounding parking lots for $12 million with plans to spend $4 million on stadium improvements.

In May 2026, the venue was renamed Route 66 Stadium under a joint arrangement between the Springfield Cardinals, O'Reilly Auto Parts, the City of Springfield, Missouri State University, and Mercy. The new name honors Springfield's role in the history of U.S. Route 66; local businessman John T. Woodruff was the first president of the U.S. Highway 66 Association which advocated for the highway's construction, and the ballpark is located close to Chestnut Expressway, part of the route "The Mother Road" took through the city. In October, it was announced that the Cardinals would be rebranded to the Ozarks Springbirds starting with the 2027 season.

== Features ==
The stadium is unique due to its baseball specific outbuildings. The stadium currently has two large buildings just outside the right-field walls. The larger of the two serves as a fully furnished indoor practice facility complete with astroturf, batting cages, and a small diamond for drills. The smaller building serves as administration, including General Manager offices, as well as housing both home teams' clubhouses, a cardio workout facility, and the physical trainer's office.

The stadium is also furnished with 28 luxury box suites. Only two of the Press Box level suites were initially available for public use; the largest of the three served as a personal suite for John Q. Hammons until his death in 2013 at the age of 94.

Route 66 Stadium also boasts one of the largest high-definition video boards in Minor League Baseball.

== Events ==
In 2004, 2007 and 2012, the venue hosted the Missouri Valley Conference baseball tournament.

== See also ==
- List of NCAA Division I baseball venues
