= Itchy Jones Stadium =

Baseball park at Southern Illinois University, Carbondale, IL

- The Itch
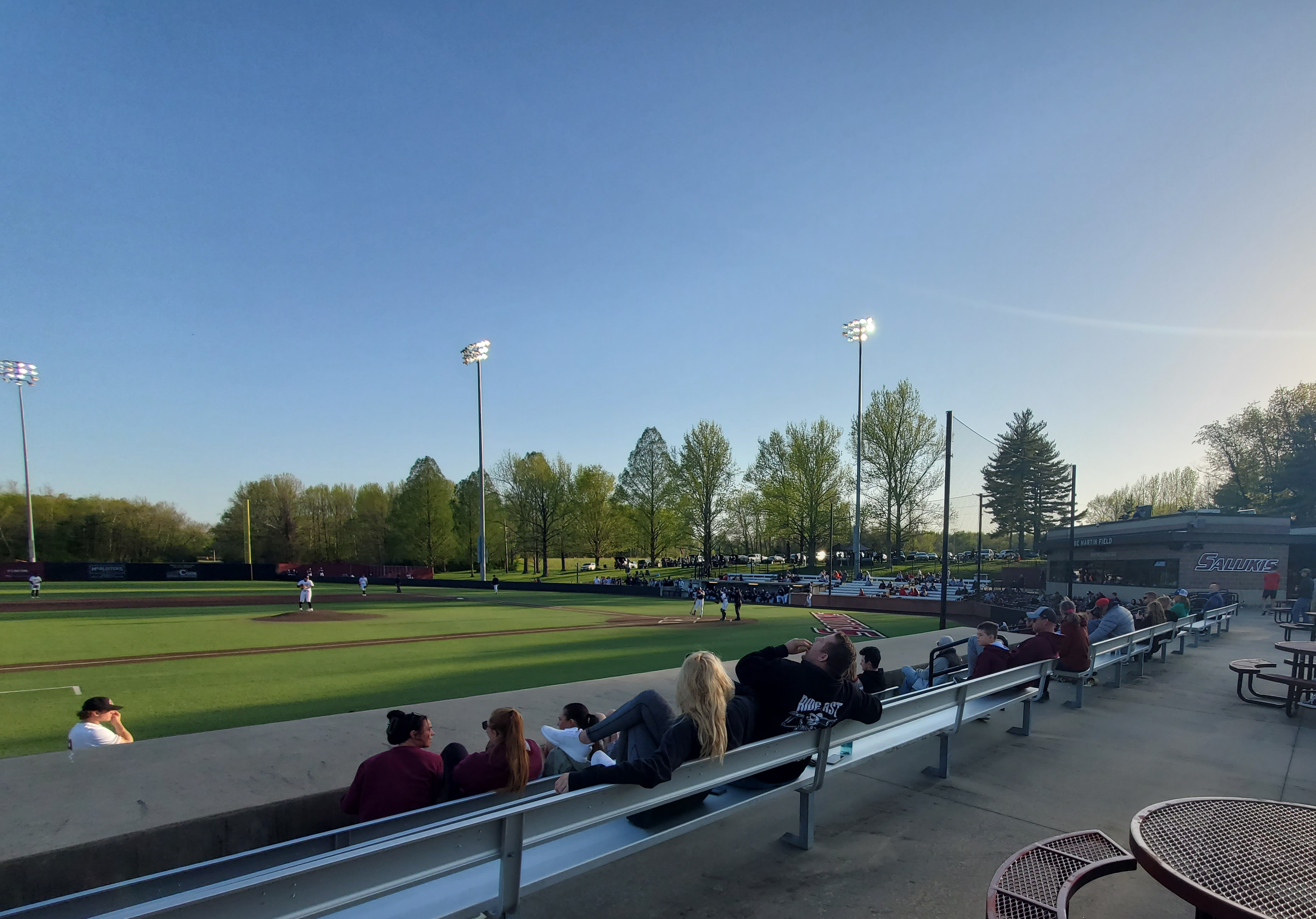
- Interactive map of Itchy Jones Stadium
- Location: Saluki Drive, Carbondale, Illinois
- Coordinates: 37.704833°N 89.221205°W
- Owner: Southern Illinois University
- Operator: Southern Illinois University
- Capacity: 2,000
- Surface: Field Turf / Dirt Mound
- Scoreboard: Electronic
- Field size: 330 ft. (LF), 375 ft. (LCF), 390 ft. (CF), 375 ft. (RCF), 330 ft. (RF)

Construction
- Opened: 1964
- Renovated: 2014
- Expanded: 1966

Tenant
- Southern Illinois Salukis baseball (1964–present)

Itchy Jones Stadium is a baseball venue in Carbondale, Illinois. It is home to the Southern Illinois Salukis baseball team of the NCAA Division I Missouri Valley Conference (MVC). The field, opened in 1964, holds 2,000 spectators. The field is named for former Southern Illinois baseball coach Abe Martin, and the venue was previously known simply as Abe Martin Field. In 2014 after a complete renovation, the larger stadium was dedicated "Itchy Jones Stadium" after head coach Itch Jones.

== History ==
After the field's 1964 construction, it remained undedicated until 1972. On April 30, 1972, the field was formally dedicated to Abe Martin. Martin coached Saluki baseball for 19 seasons (1946–1964) during a 33-year tenure at the university. A scoreboard was also added around the time of the dedication.

In the decades after the facility's opening, several minor improvements were made. In 1966, new bleachers, believed to have been taken from Sportsman's Park in St. Louis, were added. Sportsman's, the former home of Major League Baseball's both St. Louis Cardinals and Browns, had closed earlier that year. In 1988, a clubhouse was built. 2000 renovations saw bermuda grass installed in the outfield and batting cages beyond the right field fence. In 2006, an electronic scoreboard was constructed past the right center field fence.

=== 2011 renovations ===
As Martin Field entered its fifth decade of use, calls for improving the aging facility increased. The facility, called "Ancient Abe" by the Southern Illinoisan writer Todd Hefferman, was the oldest in use by a MVC team. In 2011, plans were made to update the field.

The university announced in May 2011 a fundraising campaign to renovate Abe Martin Field. Planned additions include stadium lighting, a press box, fencing, and new dugouts. A new seating structure was built, and Martin's combination rye and Bermuda grass surface was replaced by FieldTurf. Saluki head baseball coach Ken Henderson supported the effort, saying, "To take the next step, to take that next big step, we've gotta have that facility." Computer images of the future facility were made available. On March 13, 2014, the field was officially renamed in honor of Jones. Jones was in attendance and threw out a ceremonial first pitch.

== See also ==
- List of NCAA Division I baseball venues
