= 2021 Missouri Valley Conference baseball tournament =

Postseason collegiate baseball tournament

- Teams: 8
- Format: Double-elimination
- Finals site: Itchy Jones Stadium; Carbondale, Illinois
- Champions: Dallas Baptist (4th title)
- Winning coach: Dan Heefner (4th title)
- MVP: Jace Grady (Dallas Baptist)
- Television: ESPN+

2021 Missouri Valley Conference baseball standings
	Conf.				Overall
Team	W		L	PCT	W		L	PCT
Dallas Baptist ‍‍‡‍^{y}	18	–	6	.750	41	–	16	.719
Indiana State ‍‍‍^{y}	14	–	10	.583	31	–	21	.596
Bradley ‍‍‍	12	–	10	.545	20	–	22	.476
Southern Illinois ‍‍‍	15	–	13	.536	40	–	20	.667
Missouri State ‍‍‍	11	–	13	.458	21	–	23	.477
Illinois State ‍‍‍	12	–	15	.444	23	–	34	.404
Evansville ‍‍‍	11	–	16	.407	28	–	27	.509
Valparaiso ‍‍‍	9	–	19	.321	16	–	35	.314
‡ – Tournament champion y – Invited to the NCAA tournament As of June 12, 2021; Rankings from D1Baseball

The 2021 Missouri Valley Conference baseball tournament was held from May 25 through 30, 2021. All eight baseball-sponsoring schools in the conference participated in the double-elimination tournament held at Southern Illinois University's Itchy Jones Stadium in Carbondale, Illinois. The winner of the tournament, Dallas Baptist, earned the conference's automatic bid to the 2021 NCAA Division I baseball tournament.

== Seeding and format ==
The league's eight teams were seeded based on conference winning percentage. The four lowest seeded teams played in a single elimination round, with the two winners advancing to the six-team double-elimination bracket.

== Results ==
=== Play-In Round ===
Team	R
#6 Illinois State	10
#7 Evansville	9^{12}

Team	R
#5 Missouri State	4
#8 Valparaiso	6^{10}

=== Double-Elimination Rounds ===
First round
1	Dallas Baptist	12
8	Valparaiso	2
2	Indiana State	5
6	Illinois State	2
3	Bradley	1
4	Southern Illinois	13

Second round
1	Dallas Baptist	10
3	Bradley	5
2	Indiana State	11
4	Southern Illinois	8
8	Valparaiso	6
6	Illinois State	5

Third round
1	Dallas Baptist	10
2	Indiana State	1
4	Southern Illinois	11
8	Valparaiso	5

Semifinals
2	Indiana State	9
4	Southern Illinois	7

Final
1	Dallas Baptist	12	-
2	Indiana State	8^{11}	-

== Conference championship ==
Missouri Valley Championship
(1) Dallas Baptist Patriots	vs.	(2) Indiana State Sycamores

May 30, 2021, 11:02 a.m. (CDT) at Itchy Jones Stadium in Carbondale, Illinois
Team	1	2	3	4	5	6	7	8	9	10	11	R	H	E
(1) Dallas Baptist	1	0	0	0	2	2	0	1	0	1	5	12	14	1
(2) Indiana State	2	2	0	1	0	0	1	0	0	1	1	8	16	5
WP: Dominic Hamel (12–2) LP: Connor Fenlong (4–2); Home runs: DBU: Jace Grady (2); Blayne Jones; ISU: Aaron Beck
