= 2018 Missouri Valley Conference baseball tournament =

- Teams: 8
- Format: Double-elimination
- Finals site: Horner Ballpark; Dallas, Texas
- Champions: Missouri State (4th title)
- Winning coach: Keith Guttin (4th title)
- MVP: Ben Whetstone (Missouri State)
- Television: ESPN+

2018 Missouri Valley Conference baseball standings
	Conf.				Overall
Team	W		L	PCT	W		L	PCT
No. 29 Missouri State ‍‍‍	18	–	3	.857	35	–	15	.700
Dallas Baptist ‍‍‍	16	–	5	.762	36	–	17	.679
Bradley ‍‍‍	11	–	10	.524	30	–	17	.638
Indiana State ‍‍‍	11	–	10	.524	29	–	22	.569
Southern Illinois ‍‍‍	10	–	11	.476	27	–	28	.491
Illinois State ‍‍‍	9	–	12	.429	22	–	28	.440
Valparaiso ‍‍‍	6	–	15	.286	18	–	32	.360
Evansville ‍‍‍	3	–	18	.143	12	–	37	.245
‡ – Tournament champion As of May 20, 2018; Rankings from Collegiate Baseball

The 2018 Missouri Valley Conference baseball tournament was held from May 23 through 26. All eight baseball-sponsoring schools in the conference participated in the double-elimination tournament that was held at Dallas Baptist's Horner Ballpark in Dallas, Texas. The winner of the tournament earned the conference's automatic bid to the 2018 NCAA Division I baseball tournament.

== Seeding and format ==
The league's eight teams were seeded based on conference winning percentage. The teams played a two bracket, double-elimination format tournament, with the winner of each bracket then playing a single elimination final.

== Results ==
First round
1	Missouri State	10
8	Evansville	0
4	Indiana State	9
5	Southern Illinois	7
5	Southern Illinois	5^{12}
8	Evansville	4
2	Dallas Baptist	10
7	Valparaiso	13
3	Bradley	14
6	Illinois State	2
2	Dallas Baptist	10
6	Illinois State	6

Second round
1	Missouri State	4
4	Indiana State	2
5	Southern Illinois	12
4	Indiana State	14 ^{10}
7	Valparaiso	9
3	Bradley	11
2	Dallas Baptist	7
7	Valparaiso	5

Semifinals
1	Missouri State	9	–
4	Indiana State	6	–
3	Bradley	7	1
2	Dallas Baptist	14	11^{7}

Finals
1	Missouri State	7^{10}
2	Dallas Baptist	6
