= 2015 Missouri Valley Conference baseball tournament =

- Teams: 8
- Format: Double-elimination
- Finals site: Eck Stadium; Wichita, KS
- Champions: Missouri State (3rd title)
- Winning coach: Keith Guttin (3rd title)
- MVP: Eric Cheray (Missouri State)

2015 Missouri Valley Conference baseball standings
	Conf.				Overall
Team	W		L	PCT	W		L	PCT
No. 13 Missouri State ‍‍‡‍^{y}	18	–	3	.857	41	–	10	.804
No. 21 Dallas Baptist ‍‍‍^{y}	15	–	6	.714	41	–	11	.788
Bradley ‍‍‍^{y}	10	–	11	.476	32	–	18	.640
Wichita State ‍‍‍	10	–	11	.476	24	–	31	.436
Illinois State ‍‍‍	9	–	12	.429	27	–	25	.519
Evansville ‍‍‍	8	–	13	.381	29	–	22	.569
Indiana State ‍‍‍	8	–	13	.381	27	–	24	.529
Southern Illinois ‍‍‍	6	–	15	.286	11	–	44	.200
‡ – Tournament champion y – Invited to the NCAA tournament As of May 16, 2015; Rankings from Collegiate Baseball

The 2015 Missouri Valley Conference baseball tournament was held from May 19 through 23, 2015. All eight baseball-sponsoring schools in the conference participated in the double-elimination tournament at Wichita State's Eck Stadium in Wichita, Kansas. Missouri State, the winner of the tournament, won the conference's automatic bid to the 2015 NCAA Division I baseball tournament.

== Seeding and format ==
The league's eight teams were seeded based on conference winning percentage. The teams played a two bracket, double-elimination format tournament, with the winner of each bracket then playing a single elimination final.

== Results ==
First round
1	Missouri State	7
8	Southern Illinois	0
4	Wichita State	4
5	Illinois State	3
8	Southern Illinois	7
5	Illinois State	1
2	Dallas Baptist	0
7	Indiana State	2
3	Bradley	9
6	Evansville	2
6	Evansville	0
2	Dallas Baptist	3

Second round
1	Missouri State	8
4	Wichita State	1
8	Southern Illinois	1
4	Wichita State	15
7	Indiana State	4
3	Bradley	5
2	Dallas Baptist	12
7	Indiana State	5

Semifinals
1	Missouri State	6	–
4	Wichita State	4	–
3	Bradley	3	–
2	Dallas Baptist	1	–

Final
1	Missouri State	5
3	Bradley	2
