= Bob Warn Field at Sycamore Stadium =

Baseball park in Terre Haute, Indiana, U.S.

Sycamore Stadium
- Interactive map of Sycamore Stadium
- Former names: Sycamore Field
- Location: Terre Haute, Indiana, United States
- Coordinates: 39°28′43″N 87°24′59″W
- Owner: Indiana State University
- Operator: Indiana State University
- Capacity: 2,500
- Surface: Artificial turf and natural grass
- Field size: Left Field - 340 feet Left Center - 372 feet Center Field - 402 feet Right Center - 372 feet Right Field - 340 feet

Construction
- Groundbreaking: July 31, 1976
- Built: 1976-77
- Opened: 1978
- Renovated: 2009
- Expanded: 2009

Tenants
- Indiana State Sycamores (NCAA) 1978–present Terre Haute Rex (PL) 2010–present

Sycamore Stadium is a baseball stadium in Terre Haute, Indiana, United States. The venue is used by both the Indiana State Sycamores baseball team of the Missouri Valley Conference and the Terre Haute Rex of the college summer Prospect League. It has a capacity of 2,500 spectators.

To date, it has hosted four Missouri Valley Conference Baseball Championships, 1982, 2014, 2016, and 2023. It has also served as a regional host of the 2023 NCAA baseball tournament. It regularly serves as a venue for IHSAA and American Legion Baseball tournaments.

== Field ==
Since moving into Sycamore Field in 1978, Indiana State University has played over 850 baseball games at home and posted an outstanding record of 586–268–1 (.686). At the conclusion of the 2009 season, Sycamore Field was completely renovated and renamed Bob Warn Field at Sycamore Stadium in honor of Indiana State University's coach, Bob Warn.

The field is also distinguishable, as it has an infield which is completely artificial turf and an outfield of natural grass.

== Facility ==
The stadium features:

- 2,500 seats
  - 389 chairback seats centered among the bleacher seats
  - 1,910 bleacher seats
- Locker rooms for the home and visiting teams
- A climate-controlled press box
- Offices for the head coach and assistants
- An indoor hitting facility
- Stadium lighting
- Infield turf and grass outfield

== See also ==
- List of NCAA Division I baseball venues
