= 2014 Missouri Valley Conference baseball tournament =

- MVC Baseball Tournament
- Teams: 8
- Format: Double-elimination
- Finals site: Bob Warn Field at Sycamore Stadium; Terre Haute, IN
- Champions: Dallas Baptist (1st title)
- Winning coach: Dan Heefner (1st title)
- MVP: Camden Duzenack (Dallas Baptist)
- Television: ESPN3

2014 Missouri Valley Conference baseball standings
	Conf.				Overall
Team	W		L	PCT	W		L	PCT
Evansville ‍‍‍	15	–	6	.714	34	–	21	.618
Indiana State ‍‍‍	14	–	7	.667	35	–	16	.686
Dallas Baptist ‍‍‡‍	14	–	7	.667	38	–	19	.667
Wichita State ‍‍‍	13	–	8	.619	31	–	28	.525
Illinois State ‍‍‍	10	–	11	.476	33	–	21	.611
Missouri State ‍‍‍	9	–	12	.429	26	–	31	.456
Bradley ‍‍‍	4	–	16	.200	24	–	27	.471
Southern Illinois ‍‍‍	4	–	17	.190	26	–	31	.456
‡ – Tournament champion As of May 24, 2014; Rankings from Collegiate Baseball

The 2014 Missouri Valley Conference baseball tournament was held from May 20 through 24. All eight teams participated in the double-elimination tournament held at Indiana State's Bob Warn Field at Sycamore Stadium in Terre Haute, Indiana. Dallas Baptist won the tournament for the first time, earning the conference's automatic bid to the 2014 NCAA Division I baseball tournament.

== Seeding and format ==
The league's eight teams were seeded based on conference winning percentage. The teams played a two bracket, double-elimination format tournament, with the winner of each bracket then playing a single-elimination final.

Team	W	L	Pct	GB	Seed
Evansville	15	6	.714	–	1
Indiana State	14	7	.667	1	2
Dallas Baptist	14	7	.667	1	3
Wichita State	13	8	.619	2	4
Illinois State	10	11	.476	5	5
Missouri State	9	12	.429	6	6
Bradley	4	16	.200	10.5	7
Southern Illinois	4	17	.190	11	8

== Results ==
First round
1	Evansville	1
8	Southern Illinois	9
4	Wichita State	0
5	Illinois State	6
1	Evansville	6
4	Wichita State	8
2	Indiana State	2
7	Bradley	6
3	Dallas Baptist	3
6	Missouri State	2
2	Indiana State	1
6	Missouri State	9

Second round
8	Southern Illinois	1
5	Illinois State	6
8	Southern Illinois	1
4	Wichita State	4
7	Bradley	5
3	Dallas Baptist	6
7	Bradley	2
6	Missouri State	7

Semifinals
5	Illinois State	6	–
4	Wichita State	1	–
3	Dallas Baptist	3	9
6	Missouri State	5	4

Final
5	Illinois State	1
3	Dallas Baptist	4

== All-Tournament Team ==
The following players were named to the All-Tournament Team. Dallas Baptist shortstop Camden Duzenack, one of four Patriots selected, was named Most Outstanding Player.

Pos.	Name	Team
1B	Mason Snyder	Illinois State
2B	Drew Turbin	Dallas Baptist
SS	Camden Duzenack	Dallas Baptist
3B	Brock Stewart	Illinois State
C	Mike Hollenbeck	Illinois State
UT	Mike Wesolowski	Dallas Baptist
DH	Logan Leverett	Illinois State
OF	Daniel Dwyer	Illinois State
OF	Tate Matheny	Missouri State
OF	Max Murphy	Bradley
P	Dillon Craig	Illinois State
P	Cy Sneed	Dallas Baptist
