= 2017 Missouri Valley Conference baseball tournament =

- Teams: 8
- Format: Double-elimination
- Finals site: Hammons Field; Springfield, Missouri
- Champions: Dallas Baptist (3rd title)
- Winning coach: Dan Heefner (3rd title)
- MVP: Devlin Granberg (Dallas Baptist)

2017 Missouri Valley Conference baseball standings
	Conf.				Overall
Team	W		L	PCT	W		L	PCT
No. 11 Missouri St^{y} ‍‍‍	18	–	1	.947	43	–	20	.683
No. 20 DBU^{y} ‍‍‡‍	15	–	6	.714	42	–	21	.667
Indiana State ‍‍‍	12	–	9	.571	29	–	26	.527
Southern Illinois ‍‍‍	10	–	10	.500	27	–	30	.474
Wichita State ‍‍‍	10	–	11	.476	28	–	30	.483
Evansville ‍‍‍	8	–	12	.400	18	–	39	.316
Bradley ‍‍‍	6	–	14	.300	20	–	31	.392
Illinois State ‍‍‍	2	–	18	.100	16	–	40	.286
‡ – Tournament champion y – Invited to the NCAA tournament Rankings from Collegiate Baseball

The 2017 Missouri Valley Conference baseball tournament was held from May 24 through 27. All eight baseball-sponsoring schools in the conference participated in the double-elimination tournament held at Missouri State's Hammons Field in Springfield, Missouri. The winner of the tournament earned the conference's automatic bid to the 2017 NCAA Division I baseball tournament.

== Seeding and format ==
The league's eight teams will be seeded based on conference winning percentage. The teams will play a two bracket, double-elimination format tournament, with the winner of each bracket then playing a single elimination final.

== Results ==
First round
1	Missouri State	0
8	Illinois State	1
4	Southern Illinois	1
5	Wichita State	3^{10}
4	Southern Illinois	3
1	Missouri State	13
2	Dallas Baptist	15
7	Bradley	9
3	Indiana State	13
6	Evansville	4
6	Evansville	12^{7}
7	Bradley	2

Second round
8	Illinois State	7
5	Wichita State	4
5	Wichita State	3
1	Missouri State	6
2	Dallas Baptist	6
3	Indiana State	2
3	Indiana State	11
6	Evansville	3

Semifinals
8	Illinois State	6	7
1	Missouri State	8	2
2	Dallas Baptist	6	-
3	Indiana State	5	-

Final
8	Illinois State	6
2	Dallas Baptist	10
