= 2016 Missouri Valley Conference baseball tournament =

- Teams: 8
- Format: Double-elimination
- Finals site: Bob Warn Field at Sycamore Stadium; Terre Haute, Indiana
- Champions: Dallas Baptist (2nd title)
- Winning coach: Dan Heefner (2nd title)
- MVP: Spencer Johnson (Missouri State)

2016 Missouri Valley Conference baseball standings
	Conf.						Overall
Team	W		L		T	PCT	W		L		T	PCT
#24 Dallas Baptist ‡^{y} ‍‍‍	15	–	5	–	0	.750	44	–	19	–	0	.698
Indiana State ‍‍‍	13	–	8	–	0	.619	35	–	21	–	0	.625
Bradley ‍‍‍	11	–	9	–	0	.550	29	–	21	–	0	.580
Southern Illinois ‍‍‍	11	–	10	–	0	.524	31	–	25	–	1	.553
Evansville ‍‍‍	9	–	12	–	0	.429	29	–	27	–	0	.518
Wichita State ‍‍‍	9	–	12	–	0	.429	21	–	37	–	0	.362
Missouri State ‍‍‍	7	–	13	–	0	.350	38	–	21	–	0	.644
Illinois State ‍‍‍	7	–	13	–	0	.350	17	–	37	–	0	.315
‡ – Tournament champion y – Invited to the NCAA tournament As of June 11, 2016; Rankings from Collegiate Baseball

The 2016 Missouri Valley Conference baseball tournament was held from May 25 through 28. All eight baseball-sponsoring schools in the conference participated in the double-elimination tournament held at Indiana State's Bob Warn Field at Sycamore Stadium in Terre Haute, Indiana. The winner of the tournament earned the conference's automatic bid to the 2016 NCAA Division I baseball tournament.

== Seeding and format ==
The league's eight teams will be seeded based on conference winning percentage. The teams will play a two bracket, double-elimination format tournament, with the winner of each bracket then playing a single elimination final.

Team	W	L	Pct	GB	Seed
Dallas Baptist	15	5	.750	—	1
Indiana State	13	8	.619	2.5	2
Bradley	11	9	.550	4	3
Southern Illinois	11	10	.524	4.5	4
Evansville	9	12	.429	6.5	5
Wichita State	9	12	.429	6.5	6
Missouri State	7	13	.350	8	7
Illinois State	7	13	.350	8	8

== Results ==
First round
1	Dallas Baptist	9
8	Illinois State	5
4	Southern Illinois	4
5	Evansville	3
5	Evansville	4
8	Illinois State	3
2	Indiana State	4
7	Missouri State	12
3	Bradley	5
6	Wichita State	2
2	Indiana State	7
6	Wichita State	1

Second round
1	Dallas Baptist	10
4	Southern Illinois	8
4	Southern Illinois	2
5	Evansville	3
7	Missouri State	0
3	Bradley	10
7	Missouri State	11
2	Indiana State	4

Semifinals
1	Dallas Baptist	13
5	Evansville	6
3	Bradley	3	2
7	Missouri State	13	3

Final
1	Dallas Baptist	4
7	Missouri State	3
