= 2013 Missouri Valley Conference baseball tournament =

- Teams: 8
- Format: Double-elimination
- Finals site: Duffy Bass Field; Normal, IL
- Champions: Wichita State (18th title)
- Winning coach: Gene Stephenson (18th title)
- MVP: Garrett Bayliff (Wichita State)
- Television: ESPN3

2013 Missouri Valley Conference baseball standings
	Conf.				Overall
Team	W		L	PCT	W		L	PCT
Illinois State ‍‍‍	16	–	5	.762	39	–	19	.672
Wichita State ‍‍‡‍^{y}	15	–	6	.714	39	–	28	.582
Creighton ‍‍‍	13	–	8	.619	30	–	18	.625
Missouri State ‍‍‍	12	–	9	.571	31	–	23	.574
Evansville ‍‍‍	10	–	10	.500	24	–	34	.414
Indiana State ‍‍‍	9	–	11	.450	26	–	25	.510
Southern Illinois ‍‍‍	6	–	15	.286	25	–	33	.431
Bradley ‍‍‍	2	–	19	.095	17	–	32	.347
‡ – Tournament champion y – Invited to the NCAA tournament As of June 1, 2013; Rankings from Collegiate Baseball

The 2013 Missouri Valley Conference baseball tournament was held from May 21 through 25. All eight teams will participate in the double-elimination tournament, which was held at Illinois State's Duffy Bass Field in Normal, Illinois. The winner of the tournament will earn the conference's automatic bid to the 2013 NCAA Division I baseball tournament.

== Seeding and format ==
The league's eight teams were seeded based on conference winning percentage. The teams will play a two-bracket, double-elimination format tournament, with the winner of each bracket then playing a single-elimination final.

Team	W	L	Pct.	GB	Seed
Illinois State	16	5	.762	–	1
Wichita State	15	6	.714	1	2
Creighton	13	8	.619	3	3
Missouri State	12	9	.571	4	4
Evansville	10	10	.500	5.5	5
Indiana State	9	11	.450	6.5	6
Southern Illinois	6	15	.286	10	7
Bradley	2	19	.095	14	8

== Results ==
First round
1	Illinois State	11
8	Bradley	1
4	Missouri State	2
5	Evansville	1
8	Bradley	3
5	Evansville	4
2	Wichita State	1
7	Southern Illinois	5
3	Creighton	3
6	Indiana State	4
2	Wichita State	11
3	Creighton	4

Second round
1	Illinois State	6
4	Missouri State	1
4	Missouri State	2
5	Evansville	4
7	Southern Illinois	0
6	Indiana State	5
7	Southern Illinois	0
2	Wichita State	15

Semifinals
1	Illinois State	5
5	Evansville	3
6	Indiana State	0	4
2	Wichita State	5	5

Final
1	Illinois State	2
2	Wichita State	5

== All-Tournament Team ==
The following players were named to the All-Tournament Team.

POS	Name	School
1B	Kyle Stanton	Illinois State
2B	Tanner Dearman	Wichita State
SS	Brett Kay	Illinois State
3B	Eric Harbutz	Wichita State
C	Mike Hollenbeck	Illinois State
UT	Tyler Baker	Wichita State
DH	Johnny Coy	Wichita State
OF	Garrett Bayliff	Wichita State
OF	Chad Hinshaw	Illinois State
OF	Mikel Muhca	Wichita State
P	Kris Gardner	Wichita State
P	Dan Savas	Illinois State

=== Most Outstanding Player ===
Wichita State outfielder Garrett Bayliff was named the tournament's Most Outstanding Player.
