= Bradley Braves baseball =

Bradley Braves
- 2026 Bradley Braves baseball team
- Founded: 1898
- Conference history: Interstate Intercollegiate Athletic Conference (1911–1937)
- University: Bradley University
- Head coach: Justin Dedman (1st season)
- Conference: Missouri Valley
- Location: Peoria, Illinois
- Home stadium: Dozer Park (capacity: 8,500)
- Nickname: Braves
- Colors: Red and white

College World Series appearances
- 1950, 1956

NCAA tournament appearances
- 1950, 1956, 1957, 1959, 1962, 1968, 2015

Conference tournament champions
- 1950, 1956, 1959, 1962, 1968

Conference regular season champions
- 1926, 1928, 1930, 1931, 1937, 1942, 1949, 1950, 1951, 1956, 1957, 1959, 1968

The Bradley Braves baseball team is the varsity intercollegiate athletic team of the Bradley University in Peoria, Illinois, United States. The team competes in the National Collegiate Athletic Association's Division I and are members of the Missouri Valley Conference. The Braves have played in seven NCAA Tournaments, going in 1950, 1956, 1957, 1959, 1962, 1968 and 2015.

== Bradley in the NCAA Tournament ==
| Year | Record | Pct | Notes |
|---|---|---|---|
| 1950 | 0–2 | .000 | College World Series 7th place |
| 1956 | 3–2 | .600 | College World Series 3rd place, District 5 Champions |
| 1957 | 0–2 | .000 | District 5 |
| 1959 | 0–2 | .000 | District 5 |
| 1962 | 0–2 | .000 | District 5 |
| 1968 | 0–2 | .000 | District 5 |
| 2015 | 1–2 | .333 | Louisville Regional |
| TOTALS | 4–14 | .222 | |

== Dozer Park ==
Dozer Park has been home to the Braves baseball team since 2003. The 8,500-seat stadium is located in downtown Peoria, and is also home to the Peoria Chiefs, the High-A affiliate of the St. Louis Cardinals in the Midwest League.

== Head coaches ==
Justin Dedman was named head coach in June 2025 after the retirement of Elvis Dominguez.

- Records are through the end of the 2025 season

| Tenure | Coach | Years | Record | Pct. |
|---|---|---|---|---|
| 1898–1900, 1903, 1907, 1909 | no coach | 6 | 36–21 | .632 |
| 1901 | Norwood Gibson | 1 | 8–3 | .727 |
| 1902 | Pink Voris | 1 | 8–5 | .615 |
| 1904–1905 | D. Seisler | 1 | 14–8 | .636 |
| 1906 | G. Hughes | 1 | 5–7 | .417 |
| 1908 | L. Holsinger | 1 | 12–2 | .857 |
| 1910–1911, 1914–1918 | Fred Brown | 7 | 26–20 | .565 |
| 1912 | R. Schenck | 1 | 5–4 | .556 |
| 1913 | Les Lord | 1 | 5–1 | .833 |
| 1919 | Harold Olsen | 1 | 0–1 | .000 |
| 1920 | Joe Bike | 1 | 7–4 | .636 |
| 1921–1942, 1946–1948 | Alfred J. Robertson | 25 | 242–156–6 | .606 |
| 1949–1972 | Leo Schrall | 24 | 346–188–3 | .647 |
| 1973–1979 | Chuck Buescher | 7 | 127–136–1 | .483 |
| 1980–2008 | Dewey Kalmer | 28 | 842–772–4 | .522 |
| 2009–2025 | Elvis Dominguez | 17 | 364–453–2 | .446 |
| 2026– | Justin Dedman | | –– | – |
| Totals | 16 coaches | 123 seasons | 2,047–1,781–16 | .537 |

== See also ==
- List of NCAA Division I baseball programs
