= List of Men's Soccer Academic All-America Team Members of the Year =

Student athlete award

Men's Soccer Academic All-America Team Members of the Year
- Awarded for: The yearly outstanding men's college soccer Academic All-America team member
- Country: United States and Canada
- Presented by: College Sports Communicators

History
- Most recent: Marcus Caldeira, West Virginia; Sverre Orten, Gannon; Johnny Troiano, Rowan; Mario Goic, SCAD Savannah
- Next ceremony: 2026
- Website: Official site

The Men's Soccer Academic All-America Team Member of the Year is the annual most outstanding singular college soccer athlete of the set of male soccer athletes selected for the Academic All-America Teams in a given year. The Academic All-America program recognizes combined athletic and academic excellence of the nation's top student-athletes because the All-America teams are selected based on excellence in both classroom achievement and athletic competition performance by the College Sports Communicators (CSC, known before the 2022–23 school year as College Sports Information Directors of America, or CoSIDA). Currently, an Academic All-District team of honorees based on CSC member nominations and voting in each of eight geographic districts across the United States and Canada. The districts are as follows: – District 1 (CT, MA, ME, NH, NY, RI, VT), District 2 (DC, DE, KY, MD, NJ, PA, WV), District 3 (NC, TN, VA), District 4 (AL, FL, GA, PR, SC), District 5 (IL, IN, MI, OH), District 6 (AR, IA, LA, MN, MO, MS, MT, ND, SD, WI, WY), – District 7 (CO, ID, KS, NE, NM, NV, OK, TX), District 8 (AK, AZ, CA, HI, OR, UT, WA, Canada). First team All-District honorees make the All-America team ballots. From 1996 to 2010, this team selection process was held separately for the College and University Division. The University Division team included eligible participants from National Collegiate Athletic Association (NCAA) Division I member schools, while the College Division team included scholar-athletes from all of the following: NCAA Division II, NCAA Division III, National Association of Intercollegiate Athletics (NAIA), Canadian universities and colleges and two-year colleges. From each team one winner each was chosen from both the College and University Divisions for all twelve Academic All-America teams including soccer to be the team member of the year. Thus, all twelve Academic All-American teams (Men's and women's basketball, men's and women's soccer, men's and women's track & field/cross country, men's baseball, women's softball, men's football, women's volleyball, men's and women's swimming & diving, men's and women's tennis and men's and women's at-large teams) had one Academic All-American of the Year each of its divisions. One of these twelve sport-by-sport Academic All-Americans of the year is selected as the Academic All-America Team Members of the Year for each division. The most recent men's soccer player to win the all-sports honor is Stephen Lunney of the University of Tennessee Southern (then Martin Methodist College), who received the College Division awards for the 2013–14 academic year.

In 2011, the Academic All-America program was expanded from two to four divisions. NCAA Divisions II and III were separated into their own divisions, while the College Division was then restricted to non-NCAA institutions. Most recently, effective with the 2018–19 school year, the College Division was split, with NAIA members now receiving their own set of awards, while in some sports Two-Year College, Canadian Institutions and any other institution not affiliated with the NCAA or NAIA also get a set of rewards under the College Division. However, Football has incorporated Canada into the districts for the other 4 sets.

== History ==
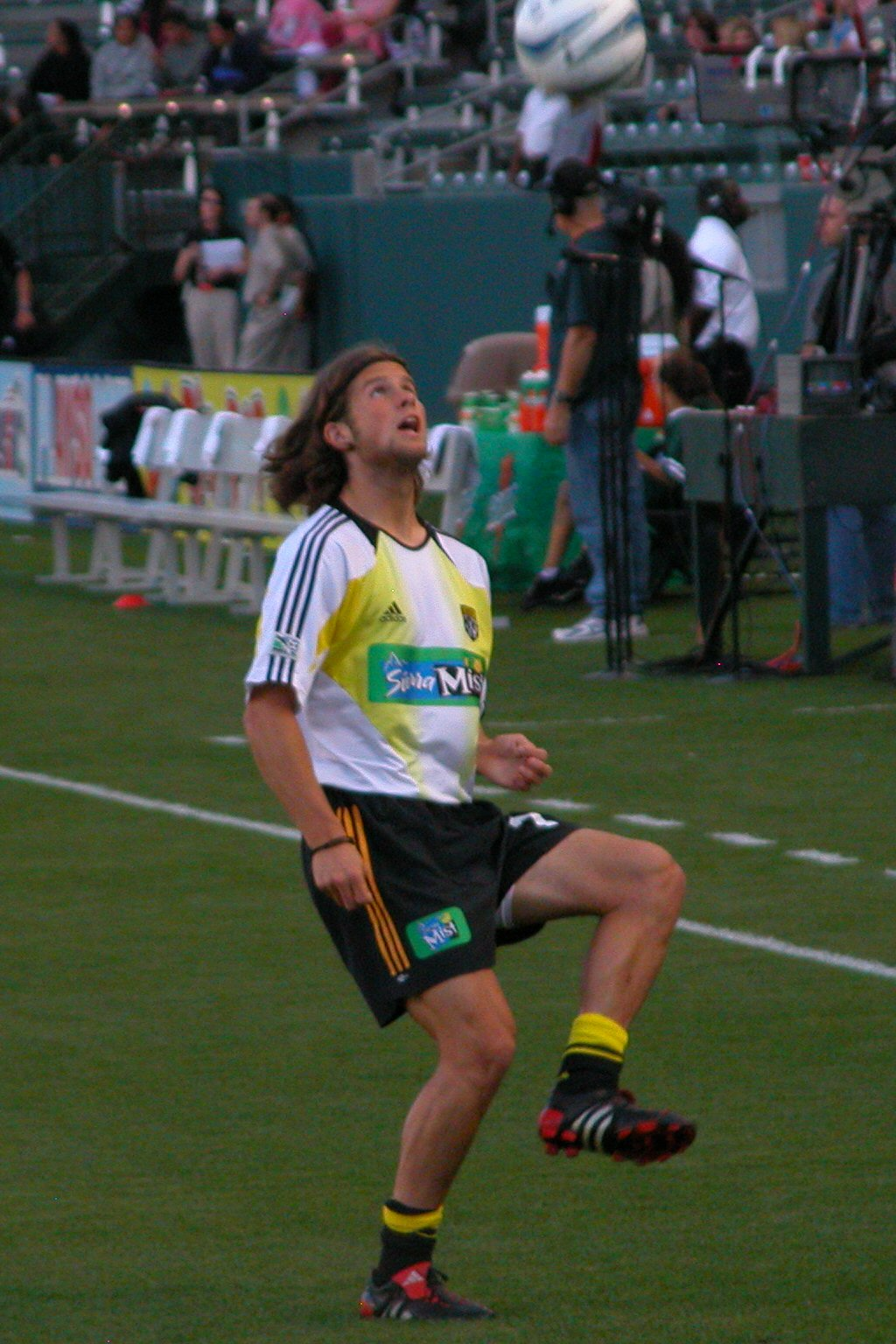
Chris Wingert, 2003 winner

As of January 31, 2024, University of New Mexico (23) has had the most men's soccer Academic All-America honorees, just ahead of Massachusetts Institute of Technology and Carnegie Mellon University with 22 each. New Mexico athletes have twice been recognized with this award. Carnegie Mellon has won it three times, while MIT has yet to win the award.

On August 7, 2012, Division III honoree Drew Golz of Wheaton College became the first men's soccer player to be named Division III Academic All-America Team Member of the Year. That same year Golz had been named Baseball Academic All-America Team Member of the Year, becoming the first male student-athlete to be named Academic All-America Team Member of the Year for two different sports in the same year. The only other previous two-sport Academic All-America of the Year award-winner had been Cynthia Capp of West Virginia Wesleyan who had been recognized in volleyball (1990) and softball (1991). On July 28, 2014, Stephen Lunney became the most recent men's soccer player to be named overall Academic All-America Team Member of the Year.

Jonathan Hall of Carnegie Mellon University became the first repeat winner of this award in 2008 and 2009 in the College Division before it was split. In the University/Division I Division, Kyle Hiebert of Missouri State Bears men's soccer repeated in 2016 and 2017. For Division II, Eivind Austboe of Lake Forest College repeated in 2013 and 2014. For NAIA/College Division, three different winners have repeated in back-to-back years and there was one non-consecutive repeat winner. Liam Barrett repeated in 2011 and 2013 for the Illinois Tech Scarlet Hawks. Stephen Lunney repeated in 2013 and 2014 for the UT Southern FireHawks. Aleksi Pahkasalo repeated in 2015 and 2016 for the Lindsey Wilson Blue Raiders. Additionally, Kevin de Lange won twice but not consecutively during the COVID pandemic for the Shawnee State Bears.

== Tables of winners ==
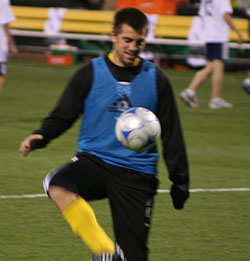
Jason Garey, 2005 winner

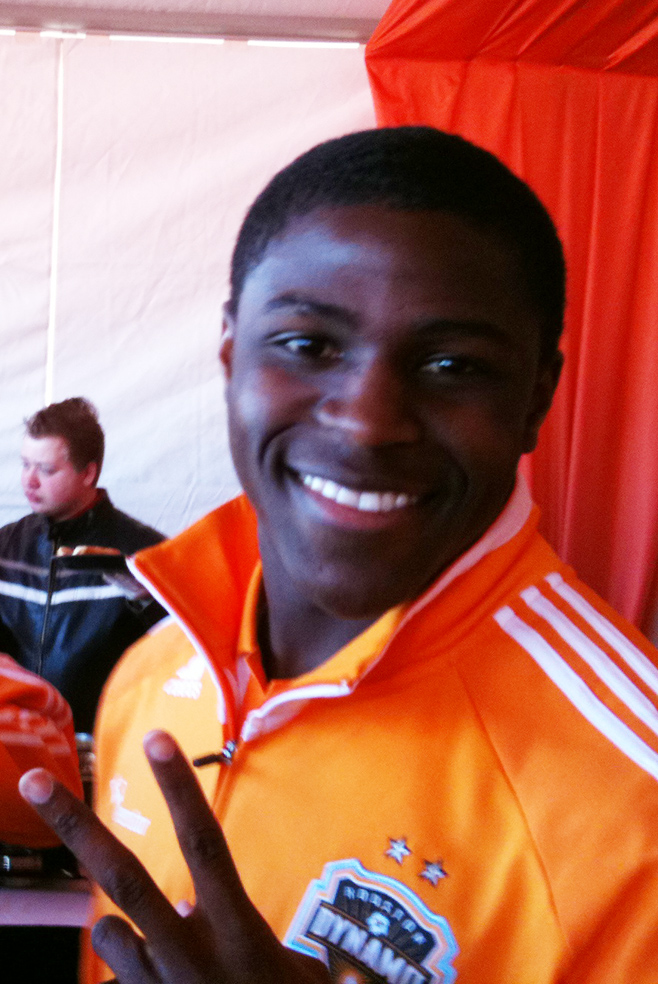
Kofi Sarkodie, 2010 winner

Key
†	Indicates winners of the all-sports Academic All-America award.

All winners are American unless indicated otherwise.

=== Two-division era (2001–2010) ===
Men's Soccer Academic All-America Team Members of the Year (2001–2010)
Year	University Division		College Division	
Year	Winner	School	Winner	School
2001	Luchi Gonzalez	SMU	Matt Ellis	Ohio Northern
2002	Matt Osborne	George Washington	Michael Lochner	Otterbein
2003	Chris Wingert	St. John's	(Jamaica) Phillip Riley	Lee
2004	Matt Groenwald	St. John's'	Patrick McGinnis	Colorado
2005	Jason Garey	Maryland	Nathan Micklos	Rochester
2006	Matt Wideman	SMU	Josh Warren	Ohio Wesleyan
2007	(Sweden) Anton Axelsson	Jacksonville	Jamison Dague	Ohio Wesleyan
2008	Zack Simmons	UMass	Jonathan Hall	Carnegie Mellon
2009	(Sweden) Simon Ejdemyr	New Mexico	Jonathan Hall	Carnegie Mellon
2010	Kofi Sarkodie	Akron	Zach Carr	Stevens

=== Four-division era (2011–present) ===
Men's Soccer Academic All-America Team Members of the Year (2011–present)
Year	Division I		Division II		Division III		College/NAIA (Note: College Division, 2011–2017; NAIA, 2018–present)	
Year	Winner	School	Winner	School	Winner	School	Winner	School
2011	Brian Holt	Creighton	(England) Mark Anderson	Barry	Drew Golz†	Wheaton (IL)	(England) Liam Barrett	Illinois Tech
2012	Scott Goodwin	North Carolina	Marc Herschberger	MSU Denver	Nate Bascom	Ohio Northern	(England) Liam Barrett	Illinois Tech
2013	Harrison Shipp	Notre Dame	(Norway) Eivind Austboe	LIU Post	(Bosnia and Herzegovina) Mahir Mameledzija	Lake Forest	(Republic of Ireland) Stephen Lunney†	UT Southern
2014	(New Zealand) Andy Bevin	West Virginia	(Norway) Eivind Austboe	LIU Post	Brian Potocnik	John Carroll	(Republic of Ireland) Stephen Lunney	UT Southern
2015	Patrick Hodan	Notre Dame	Johannes Sterobo	Northwood	Nicci Bermudes	Aurora	(Finland) Aleksi Pahkasalo	Lindsey Wilson
2016	Ben Sampson	Delaware	(Sweden) Jesper Malmstrom	LIU Post	Andreas Fatschel	Carnegie Mellon	(Finland) Aleksi Pahkasalo	Lindsey Wilson
2017	Kevin Politz	Wake Forest	(Spain) Carlos Rubio Garcia	Ohio Valley	Garrett Pochop	Simpson	Lucas Prolow	Johnson & Wales–Denver
2018	(Belgium) Simon Spangenberg	New Mexico	(Germany) Tilman Schober	Spring Hill	Nikolas Angyal	Rochester	Gary Shorrow	Point
2019	Anthony Bowie	Western Michigan	Jason Zobott	Colorado Mines	Matt Anderson	Baldwin Wallace	Nate Foddrill	Spring Arbor
2020–21 (Note: Officially designated as "2020–21" awards; most college soccer competition was played in spring 2021.)	(Canada) Kyle Hiebert	Missouri State	(France) Alexander Vencel	West Texas	Eric Kirby	Rose–Hulman	(Netherlands) Kevin de Lange	Shawnee State
2021	(Canada) Kyle Hiebert	Missouri State	(Spain) Carlos Ferrando Felis	Franklin Pierce	Jasper Yang	Grinnell	Jan Kuepper	Milligan
2022	(Germany) Niclas Wild	UNC Greensboro	(Germany) Henri Tophoven	Florida Southern	Justin Cross	Stevens	(Netherlands) Kevin de Lange	Shawnee State
2023	Dylan Sing	Western Michigan	(Italy) Matteo Napoletano	Kentucky Wesleyan	Logan Falzarano	Johns Hopkins	(Argentina) Guido Cacciabue	St. Thomas (FL)
2024	(Canada) Marcus Caldeira	West Virginia	Preston Neal	Southern New Hampshire	Nathan Donovan	UW–Eau Claire	(Germany) Ricardo Rittersberger	Aquinas
2025	(Canada) Marcus Caldeira	West Virginia	(Norway) Sverre Orten	Gannon	Johnny Troiano	Rowan	(Croatia) Mario Goic	SCAD Savannah
