= List of Baseball Academic All-America Team Members of the Year =

Student athlete award

Baseball Academic All-America Team Members of the Year
- Awarded for: The yearly outstanding college baseball Academic All-America team member
- Country: United States and Canada
- Presented by: College Sports Communicators

History
- Most recent: Noah Sullivan, Mississippi State; Dagen Brewer, Pittsburg State; Bryan Carney, Olivet; Alex Johnson, Concordia–Nebraska
- Next ceremony: July 2027
- Website: Official site

The Baseball Academic All-America Team Member of the Year is the annual most outstanding singular college baseball athlete of the set of baseball athletes selected for the Academic All-America Teams in a given year. The following is a list of the annual selection by College Sports Communicators (CSC), known before the 2022–23 season as the College Sports Information Directors of America (CoSIDA), and its Academic All-America sponsor of the individual athlete selected as the most outstanding of the annual Baseball Academic All-America selections. Between 1996 and 2011, one winner each was chosen from both the College and University Divisions for all twelve Academic All-America teams including baseball. The Academic All-America program recognizes combined athletic and academic excellence of the nation's top student-athletes. The University Division team included eligible participants from National Collegiate Athletic Association (NCAA) Division I member schools, while the College Division team included scholar-athletes from all of the following: NCAA Division II, NCAA Division III, National Association of Intercollegiate Athletics (NAIA), Canadian universities and colleges and two-year colleges.

Beginning in 2012, CSC revamped its award structure. The University Division was renamed "Division I". Since then, NCAA Divisions II and III have had their own separate All-Americans. The College Division consisted only of non-NCAA institutions through the 2017–18 school year, after which it was effectively replaced by an NAIA division restricted to members of that governing body. (Note: The College Division still exists within the CoSIDA Academic All-America program, but awards are only presented in CoSIDA's "at-large" category, encompassing sports in which the organization does not select a dedicated Academic All-America team. See CoSIDA's official calendar for announcement of its 2019–20 Academic All-America honorees.)

Currently, each team selects Academic All-District honorees in eight geographic districts across the United States and Canada. The districts are as follows: – District 1 (CT, MA, ME, NH, NY, RI, VT), District 2 (DC, DE, KY, MD, NJ, PA, WV), District 3 (NC, TN, VA), District 4 (AL, FL, GA, PR, SC), District 5 (IL, IN, MI, OH), District 6 (AR, IA, LA, MN, MO, MS, MT, ND, SD, WI, WY), District 7 (CO, ID, KS, NE, NM, NV, OK, TX), District 8 (AK, AZ, CA, HI, OR, UT, WA, Canada). First team All-District honorees make the All-America team ballots. Currently, all twelve Academic All-American teams (men's and women's basketball, men's and women's soccer, men's and women's track & field, men's baseball, women's softball, men's American football, women's volleyball, men's and women's swimming & diving, men's and women's tennis and men's and women's at-large teams) have four Academic All-Americans of the Year, one from each division. In each of the four divisions (NAIA, Division I, Division II, and Division III), one of the twelve sport-by-sport Academic All-Americans of the Year is selected as the Academic All-America Team Member of the Year for that division.

== History ==
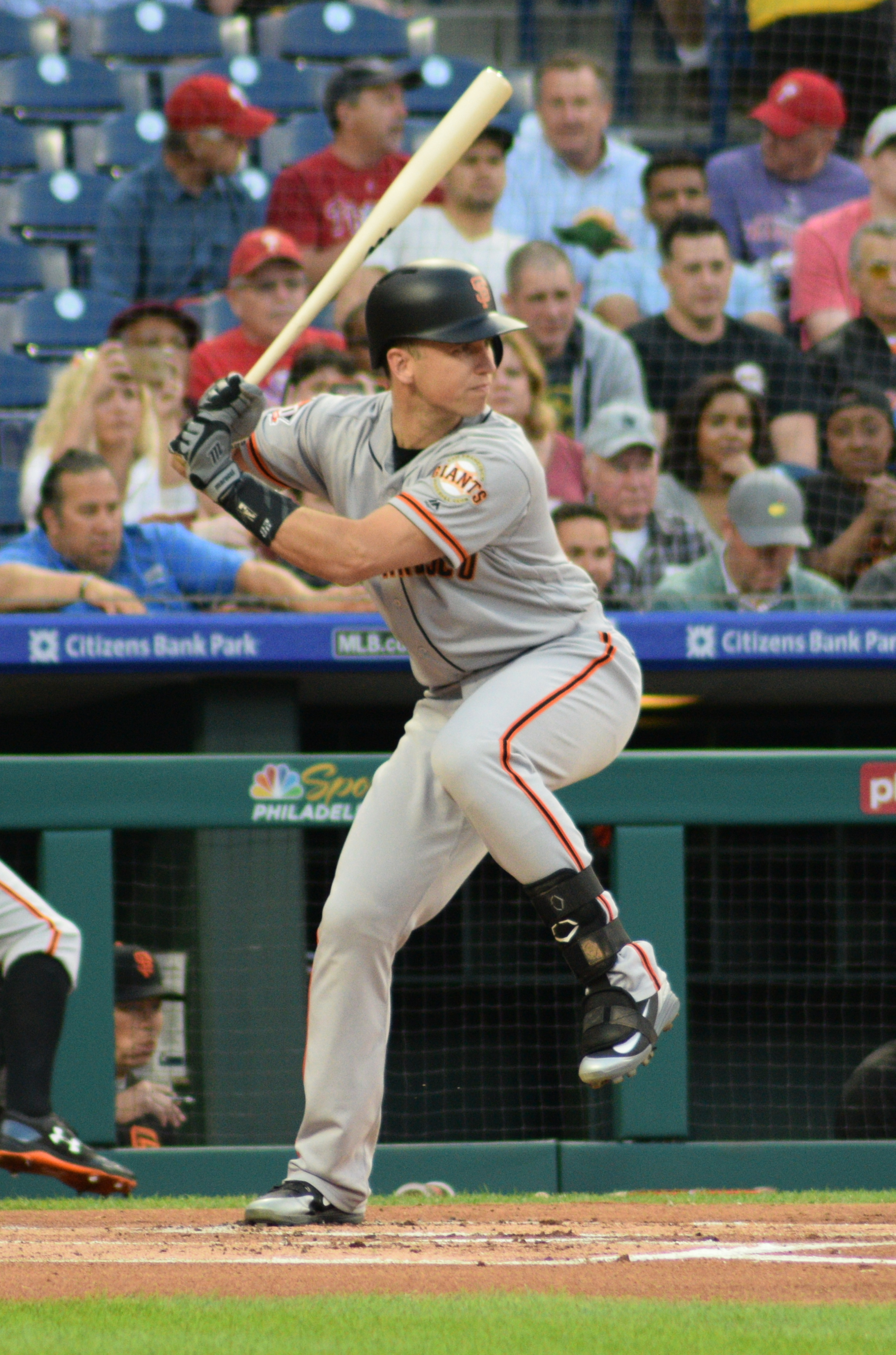
Buster Posey (pictured in 2018), 2008 winner

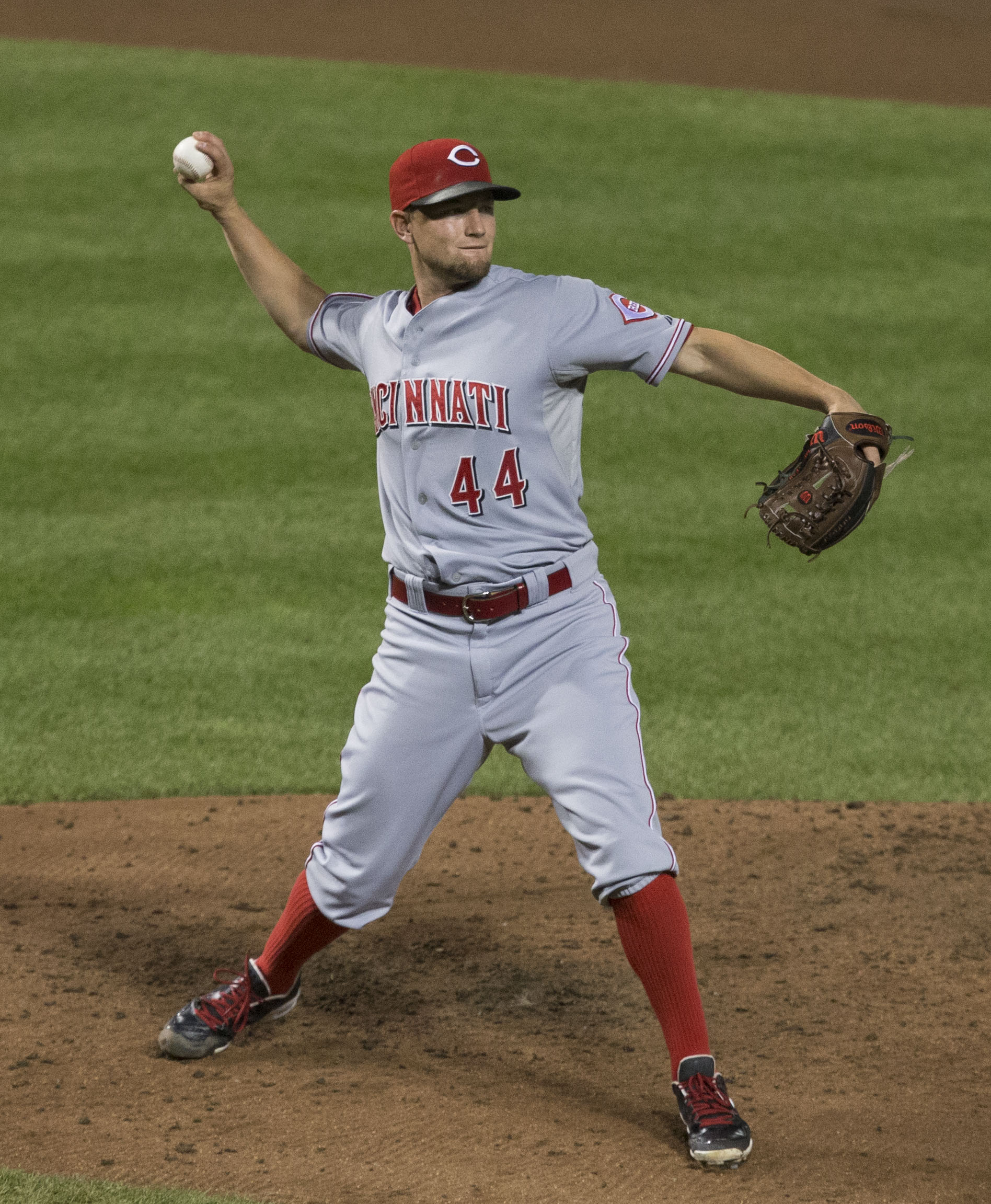
Mike Leake (pictured in 2014), 2009 winner

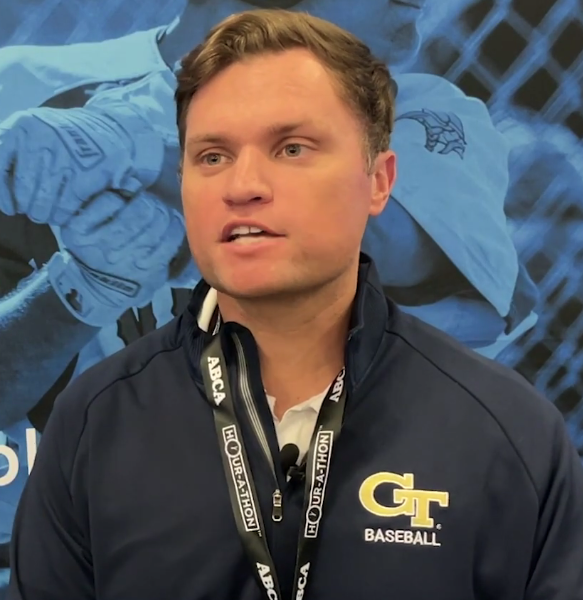
James Ramsey (pictured in 2023), 2012 winner

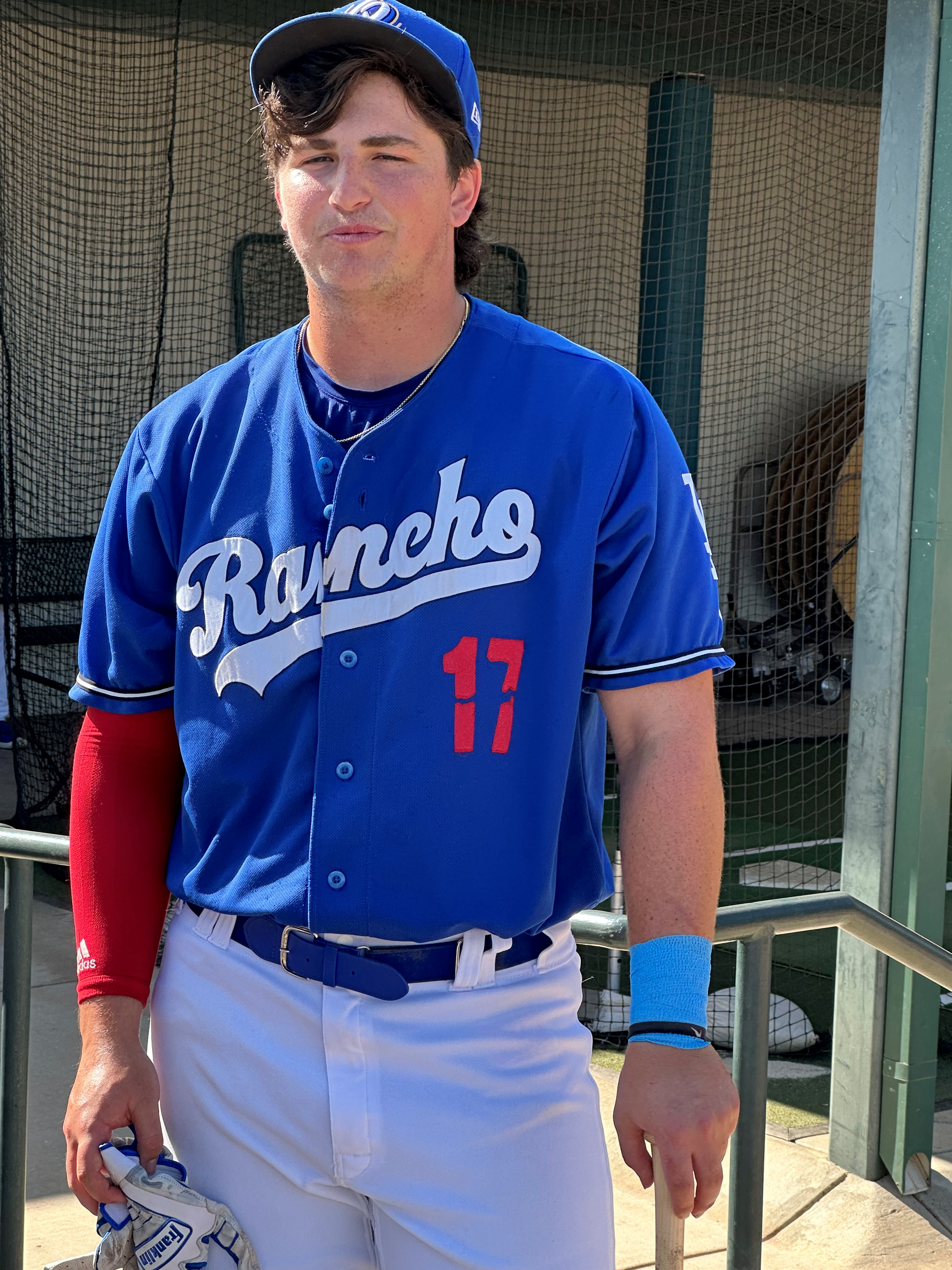
Jake Gelof (pictured in 2023), 2023 winner

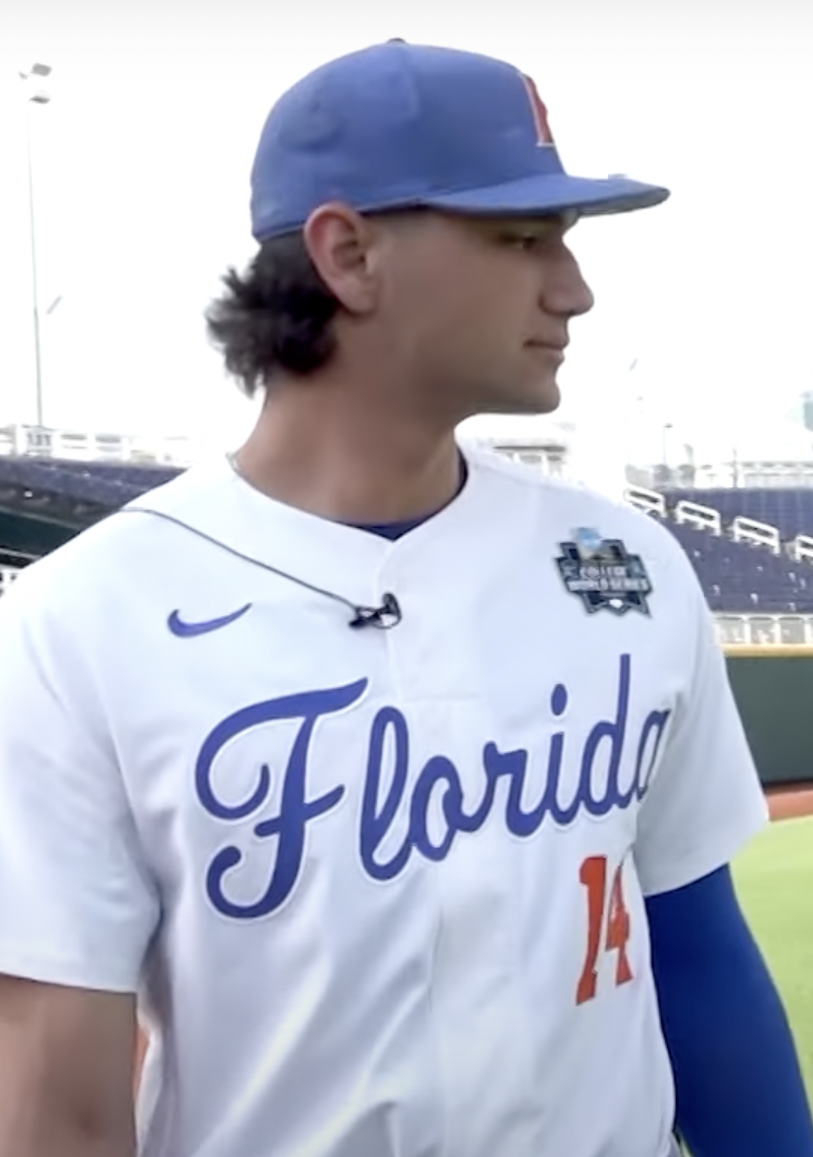
Jac Caglianone (pictured in 2023), 2024 winner

As of January 31, 2025, Johns Hopkins University (32) has had the most baseball Academic All-America honorees, just ahead of Bucknell University (31) and Notre Dame University (30). While Bucknell has had an athlete win this award, neither Notre Dame's nor Johns Hopkins' athletes have been recognized with this Academic All-America Team Members of the Year award.

On August 7, 2012, Division III honoree Drew Golz of Wheaton College became the first Baseball Academic All-America Team Member of the Year to be named Division III Academic All-America Team Member of the Year. That same year Golz had been named Men's Soccer Academic All-America Team Member of the Year, becoming the first male student-athlete to be named Academic All-America Team Member of the Year for two different sports in the same year. The next day, Division II honoree Bryan Lippincott of Concordia University, St. Paul became the Division II Academic All-America Team Member of the Year. Thus, for the 2011–12 academic calendar, baseball had the Academic All-America Team Member of the Year for two of the four Divisions. The next baseball awardee to be named overall Academic All-America Team Member of the Year was John Coleman of Division III Clarkson University. Like Golz, Clarkson was named Academic All-America Team Member of the Year, having been previously named Academic All-America Team Member of the Year in basketball. Coleman was the second male and third overall two-sport honoree, following Golz in 2011–12 and Cynthia Capp of West Virginia Wesleyan who earned the honor in volleyball (1990) and softball (1991). The most recent baseball player to receive the overall award is Tyler Horner of Oregon Institute of Technology, aka Oregon Tech, who received both awards for 2025.

When the Division I level was known as the University Division, it had repeat back-to-back winners in 2000 and 2001 as well as 2002 and 2003 with Casey Myers (of Arizona State Sun Devils baseball) followed by Jeff Leise (of Nebraska Cornhuskers baseball). In 2001 and 2002, Douglas Hargett of University of North Alabama was the first College Division repeat winner before the College Division was split. Concordia's Bryan Lippincott's back-to-back tenure as Academic All-American of the Year for baseball, transversed the split from 2 divisions in 2011 to 4 in 2012. Since Division II and Division III were split from NAIA, two-year and Canadian schools, Conner Combs repeated for the Division III East Texas Baptist Tigers in 2016 and 2017 and the aforementioned Tyler Horner repeated as NAIA baseball recipient for 2024 and 2025.

== Tables of winners ==
Key
†	Indicates winners of the all-sports Academic All-America award.

All winners are American unless indicated otherwise.

=== Two-division era (1988–2011) ===
Baseball Academic All-America Team Members of the Year (1988–2011)
Year	University Division		College Division	
Year	Winner	School	Winner	School
1988	Wesley Bliven	Santa Clara	Greg Slappey	Georgia Southwestern
1989	Burke Masters	Mississippi State	Bill Holmes	Marietta
1990	Joe Markulike	Bucknell	Sittichoke Huckuntod	Central Missouri
1991	Joey Hamilton	Mississippi State	Kevin Kluemper	Rose–Hulman
1992	Charlie Giaudrone	Wichita State	Howard Forman	Trenton State
1993	Aaron Gries	Evansville	Matt Cannon	Aurora
1994	Tommy Minor	Fresno State	Eric Miller	Pittsburg State
1995	Mike Drumwright	Wichita State	Matt Kechely	Nebraska Wesleyan
1996	Clint Bryant	Texas Tech	Brian Mazurek	St. Francis Fighting Saints baseball
1997	Andy Matko	Wright State	Bryan Welder	Augustana (IL)
1998	Charley Carter	Baylor	James Rinne	Illinois Wesleyan
1999	Hunter Bledsoe	Vanderbilt	David Bradley	Marietta
2000	Casey Myers	Arizona State	Andy Reeb	St. Francis (IL)
2001	Casey Myers	Arizona State	Douglas Hargett	North Alabama
2002	Jeff Leise	Nebraska	Douglas Hargett	North Alabama
2003	Jeff Leise	Nebraska	Kyle Foster	Emory
2004	Wade Townsend	Rice	Brady Endl	Wisconsin–Whitewater
2005	Chris Looze	George Mason	Eric Cirella	Salve Regina
2006	Philip Coker	Charleston	Adam Deurfeldt	Central (IA)
2007	Aaron Ivey	Oklahoma	Casey Jirsa	Ashland
2008	Buster Posey	Florida State	Gabe MacDougall	Lynn
2009	Michael Leake	Arizona State	Jon Alia	Cal State Dominguez Hills
2010	Jim Klocke	Southeast Missouri State	Matt Schuld	St. Thomas (MN)
2011	Matt Rice	Western Kentucky	Bryan Lippincott	Concordia (MN)

=== Four-division era (2012–present) ===
Baseball Academic All-America Team Members of the Year (2012–present)
Year	Division I		Division II		Division III		College/NAIA (Note: College Division, 2011–19; NAIA, 2018–present)	
Year	Winner	School	Winner	School	Winner	School	Winner	School
2012	James Ramsey	Florida State	Bryan Lippincott†	Concordia (MN)	Drew Golz†	Wheaton (IL)	Chad Carman	Oklahoma City
2013	LB Dantzler	South Carolina	Taylor Rakes	Tusculum	Brandon Toughey	Baldwin Wallace	Alan Spanel	Doane
2014	Tim Colwell	North Dakota State	Austin Kaiser	Colorado Mesa	Travis Mason	St. Norbert	EJ Grochowalsk	Davenport
2015	Sam Koenig	Wisconsin-Milwaukee	Michael Jurgella	St. Cloud State	John Coleman†	Clarkson	Josh DeGraaf	Taylor
2016	Cole Gruber	Nebraska Omaha	Christian Binger	Southwest Baptist	Conner Combs	East Texas Baptist	(Canada) Alex Webb	British Columbia
2017	Ben Fisher	Eastern Kentucky	Tyler Falk	Clarion	Conner Combs	East Texas Baptist	Glen McClain	Indiana Tech
2018	Devlin Granberg	Dallas Baptist	Jacob Blank	Augustana (SD)	Spencer Badia	Baldwin Wallace	Augie Isaacson	Friends
2019	Trevor Ezell	Arkansas	Mason Janvrin	Central Missouri	Mike Aiello	Wisconsin–Whitewater	Glen McClain	Indiana Tech
2020	(Canada) Nick Howie	Eastern Kentucky	Aaron Anderson	Flagler	Derek Manning	Elizabethtown	Troy Puga	Friends
2021	Brendan Beck	Stanford	Haydn McGeary	Colorado Mesa	Matt Mulhearn	Webster	Hunter Dollander	Georgia Gwinnett
2022	Aaron Anderson	Liberty	Connor Hamilton	Slippery Rock	Ryan Enos	Oswego State	Peyton Crispin	Oklahoma City
2023	Jake Gelof	Virginia	Alex Epp	William Jewell	Tyler Horvat	Washington & Jefferson	Eric Maffie	St. Francis (IL)
2024	Jac Caglianone	Florida	Alex Epp	William Jewell	Matt Scolan	Wisconsin–Whitewater	Tyler Horner	Oregon Tech
2025	Noah Sullivan	Mississippi State	Nathan Culley	Minnesota State	Jason Gilman	Kean	Tyler Horner† (2)	Oregon Tech
2026	Noah Sullivan	Mississippi State	Dagen Brewer	Pittsburg State	Bryan Carney	Olivet	Alex Johnson	Concordia–Nebraska

== See also ==
- List of Academic All-America Team Members of the Year
