= Drew Golz =

- Born: c. 1989 or 1990
- Baseball career
- Pitcher, outfielder
- Threw: Left

Last College Conference of Illinois and Wisconsin (CCIW) appearance
- 2012, for the Wheaton Thunder

CCIW statistics
- Batting average: .356
- Stats at Baseball Reference

Teams
- Wheaton Thunder (2010–2012)

Career highlights and awards
- Baseball: 2× All-CCIW; Academic All-America second team (2011); Academic All-America first team (2012); Baseball Academic All-America Team Member of the Year (2012); Academic All-America Team Member of the Year (2012); Soccer: 3× All-CCIW; 2× Academic All-America first team (2010, 2011); Soccer Academic All-America Team Member of the Year (2011); Academic All-America Team Member of the Year (2012)
Association football career
- Height: 6 ft 1 in (1.85 m)
Youth career
- 2004–2007: Oak Park and River Forest High School
College career
Years	Team	Apps	(Gls)
2009–2011	Wheaton Thunder		

Drew Golz (born c. 1989 or 1990) is an American former college baseball and men's soccer player from Illinois. A native of River Forest, Illinois, he attended Oak Park and River Forest High School where he earned All-state recognition in both sports. He was a two-sport All-College Conference of Illinois and Wisconsin honoree (three times in soccer and two times in baseball) for NCAA Division III Wheaton College (IL).

He was a two-time Academic All-America selectee in both sports and earned both Soccer Academic All-America Team Member of the Year and Baseball Academic All-America Team Member of the Year recognition at NCAA Division III Wheaton College in Illinois. He was the first male student-athlete to be named Academic All-America of the Year in two sports in the same year and earned all-sport recognition as the 2012 Academic All-America Team Member of the Year. He was the first men's soccer player and the first baseball player to win the overall Academic All-America Team Member of the Year recognition.

== High school ==
Before high school, Golz played PONY League baseball.

Oak Park and River Forest High School had been producing elite pitchers for nearly four decades before Golz arrived. As a sophomore, Golz joined a pitching staff that had just lost two arms to NCAA Division I baseball and a third who opted not to sign with the Cleveland Indians after reaching the elite eight round of the 2005 Illinois High School Association (IHSA) state playoffs. They had tallied 13 shutouts as a staff (9th in IHSA history at the time). A few weeks into his sophomore year as a left-handed pitcher in 2006, Golz was talked about as if he was a measuring stick across the region. That year, he tallied 50 strikeouts in 40 innings pitched. He earned a win in the 2006 IHSA Sectional round with seven strikeouts in 4 innings against Roberto Clemente Community Academy.

Golz was a fastball pitcher. He also has an effective curveball and changeup. As a junior for Oak Park and River Forest High School in 2007, Golz was a pitcher, first baseman and outfielder. He hit .364 and had a 1.77 earned run average with a 9–1 record, according to the Chicago Tribune. According to the Franklin Park Herald-Journal, Golz had a 1.98 ERA, allowing 30 hits and 21 walks vs. 63 strikeouts in 56 1/3 innings as a junior. They were eliminated in the 2007 IHSA Class AA supersectionals. The loss to New Trier High School was Golz' only loss of the season and ended a 20-game win streak for Oak Park. 34–3 New Trier roughed up previously undefeated Golz for a 4-run sixth inning after tying the score at 5–5 with a run in the fifth.

After scoring 50 career goals for the team, including 16 as a 4th-year starter and senior, Golz was named as a 2007 2nd team All-State soccer forward honoree as a senior by the Chicago Tribune. His 50 career goals surpassed the previous school record of 37 by a significant margin. 9 of his 16 senior-season goals came on headers.

As a 6 ft 1 in (1.85 m) 200-pound (90.7 kg) senior, In the June 2 IHSA supersectional game Golz had the go-ahead run batted in on a seventh inning (IHSA games are seven inning contests) single to break a 2–2 tie with Carl Sandburg High School. Golz was 4–4 at the plate. Golz entered the June 6, 2008, IHSA Class 4A semifinals as a starting pitcher with a 7–1 record and a 2.30 E.R.A and a .444 batting average with 47 run batted ins. In the IHSA state 11–1 semifinal victory over Wheaton North, he pitched 5 innings and struck out 8 while giving up one run on three hits to earn the win. In the championship game Golz scored the first run of the game in a 3–2 loss to Prairie Ridge High School. He earned 2008 Chicago Tribune All-state special mention recognition in baseball. The Chicago Tribune ranked Oak Park who finished with a 29–10–1 record second in the state (all-class) following the season. Golz committed to the United States Air Force Academy where the straight A's student-athlete could continue his two-sport activities with Air Force baseball and Air Force soccer. Golz was a co-valedictorian in high school.

== College ==
In November 2009, Golz earned College Conference of Illinois and Wisconsin all-conference second team recognition in soccer for Wheaton College after helping the team earn an opening round bye and home field for the 2009 NCAA Division III men's soccer tournament. Golz was a 2010 first team College Division men's soccer Academic All-America selection. Golz was a 2011 second team College Division baseball Academic All-America honoree. Golz was a 2011 first team soccer Division III Academic All-America selection and earned Division III Soccer Academic All-America Team Member of the Year recognition. In 2012, Golz was a first team baseball Division III Academic All-America honoree and earned Division III Baseball Academic All-America Team Member of the Year recognition. Golz was the first male scholar-athlete that was recognized with the Academic All-America of the Year award for two different sports in the same academic year. He was recognized as the 2012 Academic All-America Team Member of the Year (all-sports). The only other previous two-sport Academic All-America of the Year award-winner had been Cynthia Capp of West Virginia Wesleyan who had been recognized in volleyball (1990) and softball (1991). The day after Golz was named Division III Academic All-America Team Member of the Year, baseball player Bryan Lippincott won the same award for Division II, giving baseball two Academic All-America Team Member of the Year overall winners in the same year.

In college, Golz held a 3.98 G.P.A. as a chemistry major, earning an NCAA Postgraduate Scholarship. In soccer, he was a three-time All-CCIW honoree with career totals of 29 goals and 14 assists. Golz was a two-time All-CCIW honoree in baseball, and his .356 career batting average was fifth on Wheaton's all-time list. During his senior season, he posted a team high 45 runs scored and team high .404 batting average. As a lefthanded senior pitcher, Golz' single-season 8–2 record matched the school single-season record for victories. He started ten games, earning eight complete games and three shutouts in 85-2/3 innings pitched.
