= NCAA transfer portal =

NCAA database and compliance tool

- Website type: Student athlete database Compliance tool
- Owner: National Collegiate Athletic Association
- Services: Student athlete college transfer
- Website: https://apps.ncaa.org
- Registration: Access limited to NCAA members
- Launched: October 15, 2018; 7 years ago

The NCAA transfer portal is a National Collegiate Athletic Association (NCAA) application, database, and compliance tool that facilitates student athletes' transfers between member institutions. It is intended to bring greater transparency to the transfer process and to enable student athletes to publicize their desire to transfer. The transfer portal is an NCAA-wide database covering all three NCAA divisions, although most media coverage of the transfer portal involves its use in the top-level Division I (D-I).

The portal launched on October 15, 2018. Regulations adopted in 2021 allowed student-athletes in D-I football, men's and women's basketball, men's ice hockey, and baseball to transfer schools using the portal once without sitting out a year. In 2024, the NCAA authorized athletes unlimited transfers.

== Process ==
For Divisions I and II, once an athlete desiring to transfer informs their school; the school must enter the athlete's name in the database within two business days. Then coaches and staff from other universities may contact the athlete about potentially transferring.

Before the January 2026 NCAA convention, Division III schools were allowed, but not required, to enter such a student into the portal. A proposal to require use of the portal in that division was approved at the convention. The timeline for D-III members to enter athletes into the portal differs from that of the other divisions. Athletes wishing to enter the portal must first complete an educational module. Once completed, the school has seven calendar days to enter the athlete's transfer request into the portal.

== Transfer windows ==
On August 31, 2022, the D-I board adopted a series of changes to transfer rules, introducing the concept of transfer windows, similar to those used in professional soccer worldwide. Student-athletes who wish to take advantage of the one-time transfer rule must, under normal circumstances, enter the portal within a designated window for their sport. These windows are slightly different for each NCAA sport, but are broadly grouped by the NCAA's three athletic "seasons". At that time, the windows were as follows:

- Fall sports (Note: Cross country, field hockey, football, soccer, women's (indoor) volleyball, men's water polo) – A 45-day winter window opening the day after championship selections are made in that sport, and a spring window from May 1–15. According to the NCAA, "reasonable accommodations" would be made for participants in football's FBS and FCS championship games (respectively the College Football Playoff National Championship and Division I Football Championship Game (Note: The NCAA has never operated an official championship at the FBS level; the official name of the FCS playoffs is "NCAA Division I Football Championship".)), both of which take place in early January. Participants in those games had a 14-day window opening on the day after the championship game, as well as the spring window.
- Winter sports (Note: Basketball, bowling, fencing, gymnastics, ice hockey, rifle, skiing, swimming & diving, indoor track & field, men's wrestling) – A 60-day window opening the day after championship selections are made in that sport.
- Spring sports (Note: Baseball, beach volleyball, golf, lacrosse, rowing, softball, tennis, outdoor track & field, men's volleyball, women's water polo) – A winter window from December 1–15, and a 45-day spring window opening the day after championship selections are made in that sport.
- For sports included in the NCAA Emerging Sports for Women program, (Note: At the time, acrobatics & tumbling, equestrian, rugby union, stunt, triathlon, and wrestling. Rugby is a fall sport, stunt and wrestling winter sports, and the others spring sports. Women's wrestling graduated from the Emerging Sports program to full championship status in 2025–26, and acrobatics & tumbling and stunt graduated in 2026–27. Flag football, a spring sport, has since been added to the program.) transfer windows are the same as those for fully recognized NCAA sports. As with fully recognized NCAA sports, transfer windows linked to championship events open on the day after selections are made for the generally recognized championship events in emerging sports.

Student-athletes whose athletic aid is reduced, canceled, or not renewed by their school, as well as those affected by a university's elimination of a sports team, may enter the transfer portal at any time without penalty. A slightly different exception applies to those undergoing a head coaching change; student-athletes so affected in sports other than Division I football can enter the portal within 30 days of the change, starting on the day after the coach's departure is announced. The coaching change window also applied to Division I football before October 2025.

Less than a month after transfer windows were adopted, the Division I Council adopted a change that affected only graduate transfers. Student-athletes who are set to graduate with remaining athletic eligibility, and plan to continue competition as postgraduate students, were exempt from transfer windows. They could enter the portal at any time during the academic year, and were not subject to the standard deadlines of May 1 for fall and winter sports and July 1 for spring sports. In April 2024, graduate transfers became subject to the same deadlines as all other transfer students. This change did not affect windows for student-athletes affected by a head coaching change, a loss of athletic aid, or the discontinuation of a team.

Because the Ivy League allows neither redshirting nor athletic participation by graduate students, (Note: Because the Ivy League shut down nearly all sports in 2020–21 due to COVID-19 issues, the conference issued a one-time-only exception to the prohibition of graduate student participation in the 2021–22 academic year.) athletes at its member schools who are set to complete four years of attendance but still have remaining athletic eligibility may enter the portal at any time during their fourth academic year of attendance.

In October 2024, the Division I Council reduced transfer windows in football and basketball to a total of 30 days. For FBS and FCS football, the fall window opened for 20 days, starting on the Monday after FBS conference championship games. Participants in postseason play (Note: The College Football Playoff and bowl games in FBS, and the playoffs and Celebration Bowl in FCS.) had a 5-day window that opened on the day after each team's final game. A 10-day spring window opened in mid-April. In men's and women's basketball, a single 30-day window opens on the day after the second round of each Division I tournament concludes. The existing exceptions regarding head coaching changes, a loss of athletic aid, or the discontinuation of a team remained in place.

Almost exactly a year later, Division I adopted more significant changes to the football transfer portal for both FBS and FCS. The previous two windows were abolished and replaced by a single window that opens from January 2–16. Participants in the College Football Playoff National Championship—the only game in FBS or FCS played after the closure of the new window—receive a 5-day window that opens on the day after that game. The window for players undergoing a head coaching change was also reduced. A new window of 15 days opens five calendar days after the hiring or public announcement of a new head coach. Should a school fail to hire or publicly announce a new head coach within 30 days after the previous coach's departure, the window will open on the 31st day after departure, provided that the 31st day is no earlier than January 3. This particular window, also open for 15 days, may open at any time before June 30. No change was announced to the exceptions for those affected by a loss of athletic aid or the discontinuation of a team.

== Impact on high school recruiting ==
Effective July 1, 2025, the NCAA Division I Board of Directors implemented new DI roster limits following the court-approved House settlement. Additionally, according to the NCAA, "NCAA rules for Division I programs will no longer include sport-specific scholarship limits."

As a result, many top Division I programs, especially those in power conferences, are relying heavily on the transfer portal to bring in conference- and national-level student-athletes. This shift in recruiting focus has already been exemplified across Division I men's and women's track and field especially, beginning in the recruitment cycle for 2025 college entries. Track and field coaches formerly managing rosters of 120-plus (60-plus men and 60-plus women) are now limited to 45 per side for a total of 90 roster spots across men's and women's track and field, meaning they are recruiting fewer student-athletes out of high school and more immediately impactful scholarship-worthy student-athletes via the transfer portal. Roster limits for track and field teams are even more stringent in the Southeastern Conference (SEC): 35 men and 35 women.

For high school track and field athletes seeking opportunities with top DI programs, they no longer need to display potential to be point-scorers, but demonstrate the ability to contribute immediately, often by competing at a level aligned with conference scoring standards.
