= Dallas Baptist Patriots baseball =

NCAA Division 1 college baseball team

Dallas Baptist Patriots
- 2026 Dallas Baptist Patriots baseball team
- Founded: 1970
- Overall record: 832-432-1
- University: Dallas Baptist University
- Head coach: Dan Heefner (19th season)
- Conference: Pac-12
- Location: Dallas, Texas
- Home stadium: Horner Ballpark (capacity: 3,492)
- Nickname: Patriots
- Colors: Red, white, and blue

NCAA regional champions
- 2011, 2021

NCAA tournament appearances
- 2008, 2011, 2012, 2014, 2015, 2016, 2017, 2018, 2019, 2021, 2022, 2023, 2024, 2025

Conference tournament champions
- 2014, 2016, 2017, 2021, 2024

Conference regular season champions
- 2016, 2019, 2021, 2023, 2025

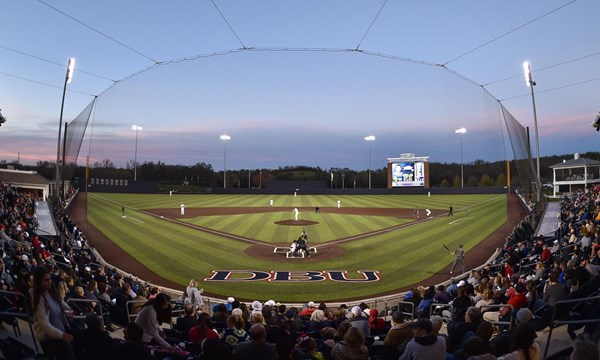
Horner Ballpark

The Dallas Baptist Patriots baseball team represents Dallas Baptist University, which is located in Dallas, Texas. The Patriots are an NCAA Division I college baseball program that competes in Pac-12 Conference. They began competing in Division I in 2004 and joined the Missouri Valley Conference in 2014 after only one season with the Western Athletic Conference. They are the only Dallas Baptist program in Division I and the Pac-12. All other Dallas Baptist programs compete in Division II's Lone Star Conference. DBU is also the only D-II member that competes in D-I baseball.

The Dallas Baptist Patriots play all home games on campus at Joan and Andy Horner Ballpark. Under the direction of Head Coach Dan Heefner, the Patriots have played in nine NCAA tournaments and hosted their first regional in 2015. Over their six seasons in the Missouri Valley Conference, they have won three MVC regular season titles and four MVC tournaments.

Since the program's inception in 1970, 18 Patriots have gone on to play in Major League Baseball, highlighted by 3-time All-Stars Freddy Sanchez and Ben Zobrist. Under current head coach Dan Heefner, 52 Patriots have been drafted, including Vic Black who was selected in the first round of the 2009 Major League Baseball draft.

== Conference membership history (Division I only) ==
Dates reflect baseball seasons, which take place in the calendar year after a conference change takes effect.

- 2004–2012: Independent
- 2013: Western Athletic Conference
- 2014–2022: Missouri Valley Conference
- 2023–2026: Conference USA
- 2027–present: Pac-12 Conference

== Joan and Andy Horner Ballpark ==
Joan and Andy Horner Ballpark is a baseball stadium on the Dallas Baptist campus in Dallas that seats 3,492 people. It was opened on February 15, 2013 with a 9–11 loss to Creighton. A record attendance of 3,242 was set on May 31, 2015 during an NCAA tournament game against Texas.

The ballpark's (and the university's) location adjacent to the Dallas-Fort Worth National Cemetery has led to a unique tradition during evening ball games: at 7PM local time, when "Taps" is played at the Cemetery, the game will stop and all in attendance will face the American flag in remembrance of those buried there.

== Head coaches (Division I only) ==
Records taken from the 2020 DBU baseball media guide.

| Season | Coach | Years | Record | Pct. |
|---|---|---|---|---|
| 2004 | Mike Bard | 1 | 44–16 | .733 |
| 2005–2007 | Eric Newman | 3 | 95–72 | .569 |
| 2008–present | Dan Heefner | 18 | 693–344–1 | .668 |
| Totals | 3 coaches | 22 seasons | 832–432–1 | .658 |

== Year-by-year NCAA Division I results ==
Records taken from the 2020 DBU baseball media guide.

Record table
| Season | Coach | Overall | Conference | Standing | Postseason |
|---|---|---|---|---|---|
Independent (2004–2012)
| 2004 | Mike Bard | 44–16 | | | |
| 2005 | Eric Newman | 32–23 | | | |
| 2006 | Eric Newman | 33–23 | | | |
| 2007 | Eric Newman | 30–26 | | | |
| 2008 | Dan Heefner | 37–19 | | | College Station Regional |
| 2009 | Dan Heefner | 38–17 | | | |
| 2010 | Dan Heefner | 28–27 | | | |
| 2011 | Dan Heefner | 42–20 | | | Santa Clara Super Regional |
| 2012 | Dan Heefner | 41–19 | | | Waco Regional |
Western Athletic Conference (2013)
| 2013 | Dan Heefner | 30–30 | 13–14 | T-7th | WAC Tournament |
Missouri Valley Conference (2014–2022)
| 2014 | Dan Heefner | 40–21 | 14–7 | T-2nd | MVC Tournament; Fort Worth Regional |
| 2015 | Dan Heefner | 46–15 | 15–6 | 2nd | MVC Tournament; Dallas Regional |
| 2016 | Dan Heefner | 44–19 | 15–5 | 1st | MVC Tournament; Lubbock Regional |
| 2017 | Dan Heefner | 42–21 | 15–6 | 2nd | MVC Tournament; Fort Worth Regional |
| 2018 | Dan Heefner | 42–21 | 16–5 | 2nd | MVC Tournament; Fayetteville Regional |
| 2019 | Dan Heefner | 43–20 | 14–7 | T-1st | MVC Tournament; Lubbock Regional |
| 2020 | Dan Heefner | 12–4 | | | Season canceled on March 12 due to COVID-19 |
| 2021 | Dan Heefner | 41–18 | 18–6 | 1st | MVC Tournament; Columbia Super Regional |
| 2022 | Dan Heefner | 34–24–1 | 11–9–1 | 3rd | MVC Tournament; Austin Regional |
Conference USA (2023–2026)
| 2023 | Dan Heefner | 47–16 | 25–5 | 1st | CUSA Tournament; Stillwater Regional |
| 2024 | Dan Heefner | 45–15 | 17–7 | 2nd | CUSA Tournament; Tucson Regional |
| 2025 | Dan Heefner | 41–18 | 21–6 | 1st | CUSA Tournament; Baton Rouge Regional |
| Total: | | 832–432–1 | | | |
National champion Postseason invitational champion Conference regular season champion Conference regular season and conference tournament champion Division regular season champion Division regular season and conference tournament champion Conference tournament champion

== NCAA Division I Tournament history ==
- The NCAA Division I baseball tournament started in 1947.
- The format of the tournament has changed through the years.
- Dallas Baptist began playing Division I baseball in 2004.

| Year | Record | Pct | Notes |
|---|---|---|---|
| 2008 | 0–2 | .000 | Eliminated by UIC in College Station Regional |
| 2011 | 3–3 | .500 | Eliminated by California in Santa Clara Super Regional |
| 2012 | 2–2 | .500 | Eliminated by Baylor in Waco Regional |
| 2014 | 0–2 | .000 | Eliminated by Siena in Fort Worth Regional |
| 2015 | 3–2 | .600 | Eliminated by VCU in Dallas Regional |
| 2016 | 3–2 | .600 | Eliminated by Texas Tech in Lubbock Regional |
| 2017 | 2–2 | .500 | Eliminated by TCU in Fort Worth Regional |
| 2018 | 2–2 | .500 | Eliminated by Arkansas in Fayetteville Regional |
| 2019 | 2–2 | .500 | Eliminated by Texas Tech in Lubbock Regional |
| 2021 | 4–3 | .571 | Eliminated by Virginia in Columbia Super Regional |
| 2022 | 0–2 | .000 | Eliminated by Air Force in Austin Regional |
| 2023 | 2–2 | .500 | Eliminated by Oral Roberts in Stillwater Regional |
| 2024 | 1–2 | .333 | Eliminated by Grand Canyon in Tucson Regional |
| 2025 | 1–2 | .333 | Eliminated by Little Rock in Baton Rouge Regional |
| Totals | 25–30 | .454 | |

== Awards and honors (Division I only) ==
- Over their 20 seasons in Division I, 20 Patriots have been named to an NCAA-recognized All-America team.
- Over their 6 seasons in the Missouri Valley Conference, 24 different Patriots have been named to the all-conference first-team.

=== All-Americans ===
| Year | Position | Name | Team | Selector |
|---|---|---|---|---|
| 2006 | OF | Drew Holder | 1st | ABCA |
| 2006 | OF | Drew Holder | 2nd | CB |
| 2006 | OF | Drew Holder | 3rd | NCBWA |
| 2009 | SS | Ryan Goins | 3rd | BA |
| 2009 | SS | Ryan Goins | 3rd | CB |
| 2009 | SS | Ryan Goins | 3rd | NCBWA |
| 2009 | DH | Jason Krizan | 3rd | ABCA |
| 2010 | OF | Ryan Enos | 3rd | ABCA |
| 2011 | OF | Jason Krizan | 1st | ABCA |
| 2011 | OF | Jason Krizan | 1st | BA |
| 2011 | OF | Jason Krizan | 1st | CB |
| 2011 | OF | Jason Krizan | 1st | NCBWA |
| 2011 | 2B | Tyler Robbins | 2nd | ABCA |
| 2012 | OF | Boomer Collins | 3rd | ABCA |
| 2012 | OF | Boomer Collins | 3rd | NCBWA |
| 2012 | SS | Joel Hutter | 2nd | NCBWA |
| 2013 | 3B | Duncan McAlpine | 3rd | ABCA |
| 2015 | RP | Chance Adams | 2nd | NCBWA |
| 2015 | RP | Brandon Koch | 2nd | CB |
| 2015 | RP | Brandon Koch | 2nd | NCBWA |
| 2016 | UT | Darick Hall | 1st | CB |
| 2016 | UT | Darick Hall | 2nd | ABCA |
| 2016 | UT | Darick Hall | 3rd | NCBWA |
| 2016 | SP | Colin Poche | 2nd | CB |
| 2017 | 1B | Austin Listi | 2nd | CB |
| 2017 | 1B | Austin Listi | 3rd | ABCA |
| 2018 | RP | Trevor Conn | 3rd | CB |
| 2018 | OF | Devlin Granberg | 1st | ABCA |
| 2018 | OF | Devlin Granberg | 1st | CB |
| 2018 | OF | Devlin Granberg | 1st | NCBWA |
| 2018 | OF | Devlin Granberg | 2nd | BA |
| 2019 | DH | Bryce Ball | 1st | NCBWA |
| 2019 | DH | Bryce Ball | 2nd | ABCA |
| 2023 | RP | Kyle Amendt | 1st | NCBWA |
| 2023 | DH | Ethan Mann | 2nd | CB |
| 2023 | DH | Ethan Mann | 3rd | NCBWA |
| 2023 | C | Grant Jay | 3rd | NCBWA |
| 2023 | SP | Ryan Johnson | 3rd | NCBWA |

=== Freshman First-Team All-Americans ===
| Year | Position | Name | Selector |
|---|---|---|---|
| 2007 | SS | Austin Knight | CB |
| 2008 | RP | Chris Haney | CB |
| 2010 | SS | Austin Elkins | CB |
| 2010 | DH | Duncan McAlpine | CB |
| 2013 | OF | Austin Listi | CB |
| 2014 | 2B | Camden Duzenack | CB |
| 2014 | OF | David Martinelli | CB |
| 2015 | RP | Dalton Higgins | CB |
| 2016 | OF | Jameson Hannah | CB |
| 2018 | SP | Luke Eldred | CB |
| 2018 | SS | Jimmy Glowenke | BA |
| 2018 | SS | Jimmy Glowenke | CB |
| 2018 | SS | Jimmy Glowenke | NCBWA |

=== Missouri Valley Conference Player of the Year ===
| Year | Position | Name |
|---|---|---|
| 2016 | UT | Darick Hall |
| 2018 | OF | Devlin Granberg |

=== Missouri Valley Conference Defensive Player of the Year ===
| Year | Position | Name |
|---|---|---|
| 2017 | IF | Camden Duzenack |
| 2018 | SS | Jimmy Glowenke |

=== Conference USA Defensive Player of the Year ===
| Year | Position | Name |
|---|---|---|
| 2023 | CF | Nathan Humphreys |
| 2025 | CF | Nathan Humphreys |

=== Missouri Valley Conference Pitcher of the Year ===
| Year | Handedness | Name |
|---|---|---|
| 2016 | Left | Colin Poche |
| 2018 | Right | Trevor Conn |

=== Conference USA Pitcher of the Year ===
| Year | Handedness | Name |
|---|---|---|
| 2024 | Right | Ryan Johnson |

=== Missouri Valley Conference Coach of the Year ===
| Year | Name |
|---|---|
| 2016 | Dan Heefner |

=== Conference USA Coach of the Year ===
| Year | Name |
|---|---|
| 2023 | Dan Heefner |
| 2024 | Dan Heefner |

=== Conference USA Assistant Coach of the Year ===
| Year | Name |
|---|---|
| 2023 | Micah Posey |
| 2024 | Cliff Pennington |

=== Missouri Valley Conference Newcomer of the Year ===
| Year | Position | Name |
|---|---|---|
| 2016 | UT | Darick Hall |
| 2018 | RP | Kody Funderburk |

=== Conference USA Newcomer of the Year ===
| Year | Position | Name |
|---|---|---|
| 2023 | DH | Ethan Mann |
| 2024 | 3B | Michael Dattalo |

=== Missouri Valley Conference Freshman of the Year ===
| Year | Position | Name |
|---|---|---|
| 2016 | OF | Jameson Hannah |
| 2018 | SS | Jimmy Glowenke |

=== Conference USA Freshman of the Year ===
| Year | Position | Name |
|---|---|---|
| 2023 | C/OF | Grant Jay |
| 2024 | SP | Luke Pettitte |

Taken from the 2020 DBU baseball media guide. Updated February 25, 2020.

== Patriots in the Major Leagues ==
| = All-Star | = Baseball Hall of Famer |

| Athlete | MLB tenure | MLB teams |
|---|---|---|
| Les Lancaster | 1987–1993 | Chicago Cubs, Detroit Tigers, St. Louis Cardinals |
| Billy Brewer | 1993–1999 | Kansas City Royals, New York Yankees, Oakland Athletics, Philadelphia Phillies |
| Darren Hall | 1994–1998 | Toronto Blue Jays, Los Angeles Dodgers |
| Jason LaRue | 1999–2010 | Cincinnati Reds, Kansas City Royals, St. Louis Cardinals |
| Scott Mullen | 2000–2003 | Kansas City Royals, Los Angeles Dodgers |
| J. J. Trujillo | 2002 | San Diego Padres |
| Freddy Sanchez | 2002–2011 | Boston Red Sox, Pittsburgh Pirates, San Francisco Giants |
| Lew Ford | 2003–2007, 2012 | Minnesota Twins, Baltimore Orioles |
| Ben Zobrist | 2006–2019 | Tampa Bay Devil Rays/Rays, Oakland Athletics, Kansas City Royals, Chicago Cubs |
| Brandon Harper | 2006 | Washington Nationals |
| Lance Broadway | 2007–2009 | Chicago White Sox, New York Mets |
| Brandon Bantz | 2013 | Seattle Mariners |
| Vic Black | 2013–2014 | Pittsburgh Pirates, New York Mets |
| Ryan Goins | 2013–present | Toronto Blue Jays, Kansas City Royals, Chicago White Sox |
| Drew Smith | 2018–present | New York Mets |
| Chance Adams | 2018–present | New York Yankees, Kansas City Royals |
| Colin Poche | 2019–present | Tampa Bay Rays |
| Cy Sneed | 2019–2020 | Houston Astros |
| Seth Elledge | 2020–present | St. Louis Cardinals |
| Ryan Johnson | 2025–present | Los Angeles Angels |

Taken from the 2020 DBU baseball media guide. and the 2021 DBU baseball media guide Updated June 9, 2021.

== See also ==
- List of NCAA Division I baseball programs
