= 2024 Conference USA baseball tournament =

Baseball tournament

- Teams: 8
- Format: See below
- Finals site: J. C. Love Field at Pat Patterson Park; Ruston, Louisiana
- Champions: Dallas Baptist (1st title)
- Winning coach: Dan Heefner (1st title)
- MVP: Alex Pendergrast (Dallas Baptist)
- Television: ESPN+, CBSSN (Championship game)

2024 Conference USA baseball standings
| | Conf. | | | | Overall |
| Team | W | | L | PCT | W | | L | PCT |
|---|---|---|---|---|---|---|---|---|
| Louisiana Tech ‍†‍‍^{y} | 18 | – | 6 | .750 | 45 | – | 17 | .726 |
| No. 25 Dallas Baptist ‍‍‡‍^{y} | 17 | – | 7 | .708 | 44 | – | 13 | .772 |
| Western Kentucky ‍‍‍ | 15 | – | 9 | .625 | 36 | – | 22 | .621 |
| Sam Houston ‍‍‍ | 13 | – | 11 | .542 | 34 | – | 24 | .586 |
| Liberty ‍‍‍ | 11 | – | 13 | .458 | 24 | – | 34 | .414 |
| FIU ‍‍‍ | 11 | – | 13 | .458 | 27 | – | 30 | .474 |
| New Mexico State ‍‍‍ | 10 | – | 14 | .417 | 25 | – | 29 | .463 |
| Middle Tennessee ‍‍‍ | 8 | – | 16 | .333 | 20 | – | 36 | .357 |
| Jacksonville State ‍‍‍ | 5 | – | 19 | .208 | 18 | – | 34 | .346 |
† – Conference champion ‡ – Tournament champion y – Invited to the NCAA Tournament; As of May 26, 2024; Rankings from D1Baseball

The 2024 Conference USA Baseball Tournament was held from May 22 through May 26 at J. C. Love Field at Pat Patterson Park in Ruston to determine the tournament champion of Division I Conference USA in college baseball. Dallas Baptist, the tournament champion, received the conference's automatic bid to the 2024 NCAA Division I baseball tournament.

The tournament has been held every year since 1996, except for 2020, due to the COVID-19 pandemic. The Rice Owls has claimed seven championships, the most of any school, with the Owls latest win in 2017.

== Format and seeding ==
The tournament consisted of the top eight teams in regular season play. The format consisted of two double-elimination brackets, with a single-elimination championship game.

== Bracket and results ==
First round
3 | Western Kentucky | 5
6 | Florida International | 7
2 | Dallas Baptist | 5
7 | New Mexico State | 3
3 | Western Kentucky | 8
7 | New Mexico State | 2
1 | Louisiana Tech | 8
8 | Middle Tennessee | 2
4 | Sam Houston | 3
5 | Liberty | 9
8 | Middle Tennessee | 0
4 | Sam Houston | 2

Second round
6 | Florida International | 2
2 | Dallas Baptist | 8
6 | Florida International | 5
3 | Western Kentucky | 8
1 | Louisiana Tech | 2
5 | Liberty | 6
1 | Louisiana Tech | 5
4 | Sam Houston | 3

Semifinals
2 | Dallas Baptist | 7
3 | Western Kentucky | 5
5 | Liberty | 7 | 5
1 | Louisiana Tech | 8 | 6^{10}

Finals
2 | Dallas Baptist | 17
1 | Louisiana Tech | 10

== Schedule ==
| Game | Time* | Matchup^{#} | Score | Television | Attendance |
Wednesday, May 22
| 1 | 9:00 a.m. | No. 3 Western Kentucky vs. No. 6 Florida International | 5-7 | ESPN+ | |
| 2 | 12:55 p.m. | No. 2 Dallas Baptist vs. No. 7 New Mexico State | 5-3 | ESPN+ | |
| 3 | 4:25 p.m. (Note: Game was halted on 5/22/24 at 7:01 pm after eight complete innings due to weather conditions. Game was resumed on 5/23/24 at 9:04 am.) | No. 1 Louisiana Tech vs. No. 8 Middle Tennessee | 8-2 | ESPN+ | |
Thursday, May 23
| 4 | 11:05 a.m. | No. 4 Sam Houston vs. No. 5 Liberty | 3-9 | ESPN+ | |
| 5 | 2:35 p.m. | No. 3 Western Kentucky vs. No. 7 New Mexico State | 8-2 | ESPN+ | |
| 6 | 8:35 p.m. | No. 2 Dallas Baptist vs. No. 6 Florida International | 8-2 | ESPN+ | 994 |
Friday, May 26
| 7 | 9:00 a.m. | No. 4 Sam Houston vs. No. 8 Middle Tennessee | 2-0 | ESPN+ | |
| 8 | 12:30 p.m. | No. 5 Liberty vs. No. 1 Louisiana Tech | 6-2 | ESPN+ | |
| 9 | 4:00 p.m. | No. 3 Western Kentucky vs. No. 6 Florida International | 8-5 | ESPN+ | |
| 10 | 7:30 p.m. | No. 1 Louisiana Tech vs. No. 4 Sam Houston | 5-3 | ESPN+ | 1451 |
Saturday, May 25
| 11 | 9:00 a.m. | No. 2 Dallas Baptist vs. No. 3 Western Kentucky | 7-5 | ESPN+ | |
| 12 | 12:30 p.m. | No. 1 Louisiana Tech vs. No. 5 Liberty | 8-7 | ESPN+ | |
| 13 | 7:30 p.m. | No. 1 Louisiana Tech vs. No. 5 Liberty | 6-5 (10) | ESPN+ | 1106 |
Championship – Sunday, May 26
| Championship | 1:00 p.m. | No. 1 Louisiana Tech vs. No. 2 Dallas Baptist | 10-17 | CBSSN | 2247 |
*Game times in CDT. # – Rankings denote tournament seed.
