= Aleksi Pahkasalo =

Finnish footballer (born 1992)

Personal information
- Date of birth: 18 July 1992 (age 34)
- Place of birth: Finland
- Height: 1.77 m (5 ft 10 in)
- Positions: Midfielder; forward

Senior career*
Years	Team	Apps	(Gls)
2010	Újpest	0	(0)
2010–2012	HJK	1	(0)
2014	PK-35 Vantaa	2	(0)
2016	Derby City Rovers	12	(11)
2017	FC Legirus Inter	19	(16)
2018–2019	KTP	52	(24)
2020	KPV	20	(6)
2021–2022	VPS	41	(12)
- * Club domestic league appearances and goals as of 16 October 2022

Aleksi Pahkasalo (born 18 July 1992) is a Finnish footballer.
