= Devlin Granberg =

American baseball player (born 1995)

- Outfielder
- Born: September 8, 1995 (age 30); Hudson, Colorado, U.S.
- Bats: Right Throws: Right

Devlin Granberg (born September 8, 1995) is an American former baseball outfielder. In 2018, he was a consensus All-American and also the Division I Baseball Academic All-America Team Member of the Year. He was later in the Boston Red Sox organization.

== Biography ==
Granberg was born and grew up in Hudson, Colorado and attended Holy Family High School.

Granberg began his college baseball career at Creighton. As a freshman, he hit for a .111 average in 18 at-bats. Granberg transferred to Cisco College after his freshman year. He batted .535 with seven home runs, 25 doubles 57 RBIs and 69 runs scored and was named the North Texas Junior College Athletic Conference Player of the Year as a sophomore. Granberg transferred to Dallas Baptist University for his remaining collegiate eligibility and led the Missouri Valley Conference with .359 batting average in his first season with the team. As a senior, he batted .443 with 13 home runs and 70 RBIs while leading the nation with 112 hits and was named the MVC Player of the Year. Granberg won the Bobby Bragan Collegiate Slugger Award as the best Division I hitter in Texas. He was also named the Division I Baseball Academic All-America Team Member of the Year.

Granberg was selected in the 6th of the 2018 Major League Baseball draft by the Boston Red Sox. He was assigned to the Class A Short Season Lowell Spinners after signing with the team. Granberg began 2019 with the Greenville Drive of the Class A South Atlantic League before being promoted to the Class A-Advanced Salem Red Sox. He returned to Greenville, now the Red Sox's High-A affiliate, to begin the 2021 season. Greenberg batted .326 with seven home runs and 29 RBIs in 27 games before being promoted to the Double-A Portland Sea Dogs.

Granberg began the 2022 season on the injured list with Portland. He was promoted to the Triple-A Worcester Red Sox after slashing .304/.427/.467 in 40 games with the Sea Dogs. He retired on July 26, 2023.
