= List of Academic All-America Team Members of the Year =

Student athlete award

Academic All-America Team Members of the Year
- Awarded for: The yearly outstanding Academic All-America team member
- Country: United States & Canada
- Presented by: College Sports Communicators
- Currently held by: Jasmine Aikey, Stanford; Owen Fraser, Missouri S&T; Graycee Mosley, East Texas Baptist; Nikki Hahn, SCAD Savannah
- Website: https://academicallamerica.com

The Academic All-America Team Member of the Year is the annual most outstanding singular athlete of the set of specific sport athletes selected the All-America Team Member of the Year for their specific sport. This is a list of the annual selection by College Sports Communicators (CSC; known before the 2022–23 school year as the College Sports Information Directors of America, or CoSIDA) and its Academic All-America sponsor of the individual athlete selected as the most outstanding of the approximately 2,000 annual Academic All-America selections.

Since the 2019 awards, one winner has been chosen for each of four divisions. Three of the divisions correspond directly to the three divisions of the National Collegiate Athletic Association (NCAA)—Division I, Division II, and Division III. A fourth division, introduced with the 2019 award cycle, is for National Association of Intercollegiate Athletics (NAIA) members. The College Division currently includes U.S. four-year institutions that are not NCAA or NAIA members, Canadian universities and colleges, and two-year colleges. The College Division was introduced in 1996, covering not only those institutions in today's College Division but also NCAA institutions outside Division I and NAIA members. After the 2011 award cycle, NCAA Divisions II and III were spun off from the College Division and given their own Academic All-America teams. NCAA Division I has had its own Academic All-America team since 1996—originally as the University Division, and since 2012 under its own name. Between 1988 and 1995, only one winner was chosen per year across all institutions participating in the program. The Academic All-America program recognizes the combined athletic and academic excellence of the nation's top student-athletes.

Currently, each team selects Academic All-District honorees in each sport across the United States and Canada. First team All-District honorees make the All-America team ballots. Currently, all 16 Academic All-American teams (men's and women's basketball, men's and women's soccer, men's and women's track & field, men's baseball, women's softball, men's American football, women's volleyball, men's and women's swimming & diving, men's and women's tennis, and men's and women's at-large teams) have one Academic All-American of the Year for each NCAA division and NAIA. One of these 16 sport-by-sport Academic All-America Team Members of the Year is selected as the overall Academic All-America of the Year for each division.

Five individuals have been named winners twice—Sarah Pavan of Nebraska in 2007 and 2008 for what was then called the University Division, Maryanne Gong of MIT in Division III and Leah Esposito of Carroll College in Montana in the College Division, both in 2016 and 2017, Giovanna Tapigliani of Missouri Baptist in the NAIA in 2021 and 2022, and Caitlin Clark of Iowa in Division I in 2023 and 2024.

== Tables of winners ==
Two-time Winners

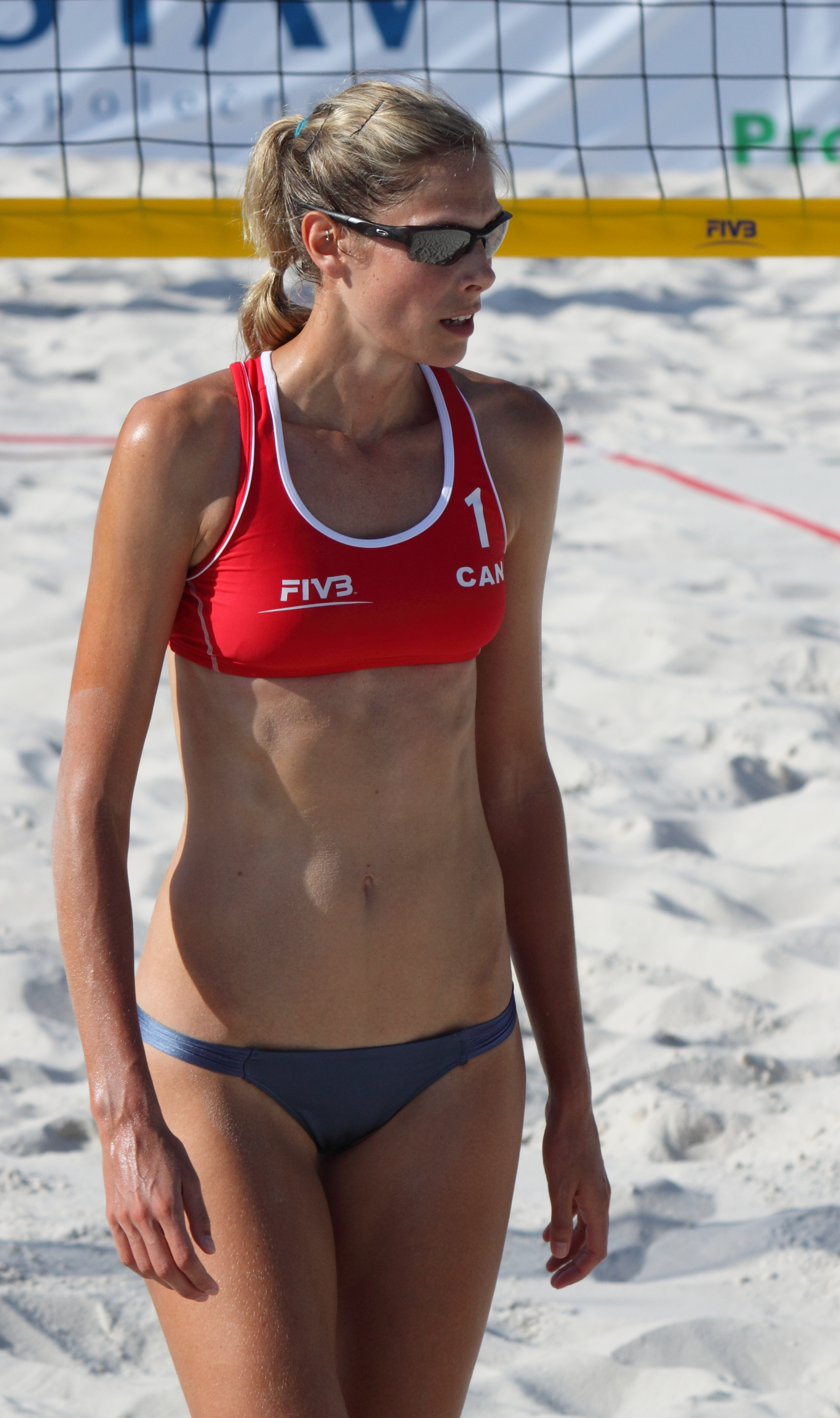
Sarah Pavan in 2014
2007 and 2008 winner

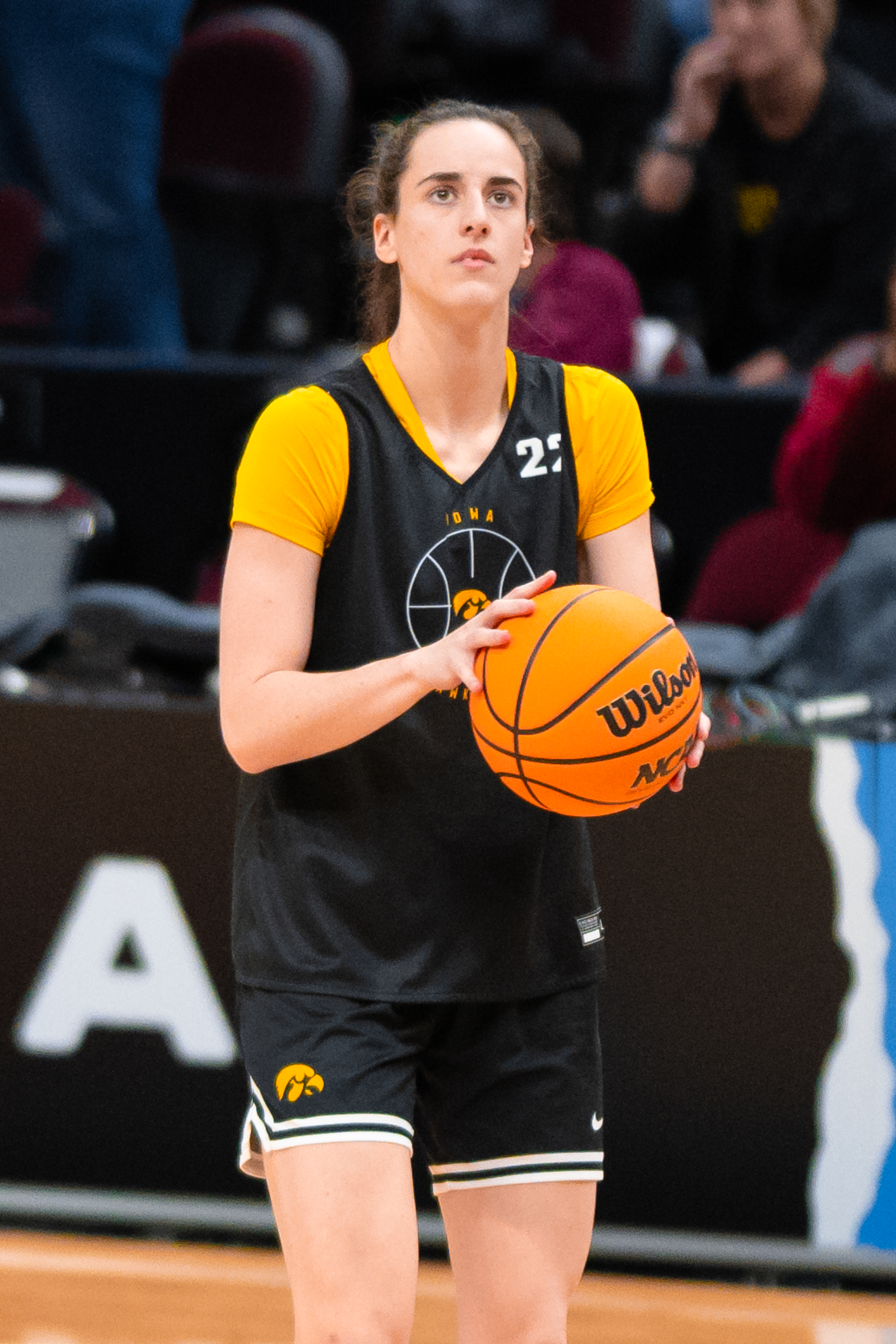
Caitlin Clark in 2024
2023 and 2024 winner

=== Single program (1987–1995) ===
Academic All-America Team Members of the Year (1987–1995)
Year	Winner	School	Sport
1987–88	Michael Smith	Brigham Young	Basketball
1988–89	James Martin	Penn State	Wrestling
1989–90	Alec Kessler	Georgia	Basketball
1990–91	Al Parker	Georgia	Tennis
1991–92	Tommy Vardell	Stanford	Football
1992–93	Jim Hansen	Colorado	Football
1993–94	Carl Erikson	Oberlin	Tennis
1994–95	Rebecca Lobo	UConn	Basketball
1994–95	Rob Zatechka	Nebraska	Football

=== Two-division era (1996–2010) ===
Academic All-America Team Members of the Year (1996–2010)
Year	University Division			College Division		
Year	Winner	School	Sport	Winner	School	Sport
1995–96	Todd Fuller	NC State	Basketball	Chris Palmer	Saint John's (MN)	Football
1996–97	Danny Wuerffel	Florida	Football	Julie Roe	Millikin	Basketball
1997–98	Peyton Manning	Tennessee	Football	Brad Gray	MIT	Football
1998–99	Matt Stinchcomb	Georgia	Football	Kelly Schade	Simpson	Softball
1999–2000	Chad Pennington	Marshall	Football	Korey Coon	Illinois Wesleyan	Basketball
2000–01	Ruth Riley	Notre Dame	Basketball	Emily Bloss	Emporia State	Basketball
2001–02	(Canada) Stacey Dales-Schuman	Oklahoma	Basketball	T.J. Hess	Widener	Football
2002–03	Theresa Kulikowski	Utah	Gymnastics	Ashley Rowatt	Kenyon	Swimming
2003–04	Emeka Okafor	UConn	Basketball	Kristen Shields	Whitworth	Track & field
2004–05	Alex Smith	Utah	Football	Carli Dale	Juniata	Volleyball
2005–06	(Canada) Christine Sinclair	Portland	Soccer	Josh Lamberson	Northwest Missouri State	Football
2006–07	(Canada) Sarah Pavan	Nebraska	Volleyball	Jamie Wolf	Clarion	Diving
2007–08	(Canada) Sarah Pavan	Nebraska	Volleyball	Troy Ruths	Washington (MO)	Basketball
2008–09	Galen Rupp	Oregon	Track & field/Cross country	Greg Micheli	Mount Union	Football
2009–10	Justine Schluntz	Arizona	Swimming	Jessica Pixler	Seattle Pacific	Track & field/Cross country
2010–11	Maya Moore	UConn	Basketball	Shannon Gagne	New Haven	Track & field/Cross country

=== Four-division era (2011–present) ===
Academic All-America Team Members of the Year (2011–present)
Year	Division I			Division II			Division III			College/NAIA (Note: College Division, 2011–19; NAIA, 2018–present)		
Year	Winner	School	Sport	Winner	School	Sport	Winner	School	Sport	Winner	School	Sport
2011–12	Brooke Pancake	Alabama	Golf	Bryan Lippincott	Concordia (MN)	Baseball	Drew Golz	Wheaton	Baseball/Soccer	Jamie Achten	Lee	Soccer
2012–13	Barrett Jones	Alabama	Football	Kari Daugherty	Ashland	Basketball	Colton Hunt	Randolph (VA)	Basketball	(Sweden) Mia Persson	Lindsey Wilson	Soccer
2013–14	Kim Jacob	Alabama	Gymnastics	Lauren Battista	Bentley	Basketball	Christy Cazzola	Wisconsin–Oshkosh	Cross country/Track & field	(Republic of Ireland) Stephen Lunney	Martin Methodist	Soccer
2014–15	Matt Brown	Penn State	Wrestling	Kristin Day	Clarion	Diving	John Coleman	Clarkson	Basketball/Baseball	(Brazil) Wanessa Siqueira	Park	Volleyball
2015–16	Carson Wentz	North Dakota State	Football	Jason Vander Laan	Ferris State	Football	Maryann Gong	MIT	Cross country/Track & field	Leah Esposito	Carroll (MT)	Cross country, Track & field
2016–17	Sarah Gibson	Texas A&M	Swimming	Marie Coors	Saint Leo	Golf	Maryann Gong (2)	MIT	Cross country/Track & field	Leah Esposito (2)	Carroll (MT)	Cross country, Track & field
2017–18	Katie Ledecky	Stanford	Swimming	(Poland) Alicja Konieczek	Western State Colorado	Cross country, Track & field	Cooper Cook	Nebraska Wesleyan	Basketball	Kyle Steigenga	Cornerstone	Basketball
2018–19	Lexi Jacobus	Arkansas	Track & field	Charlie Bertrand	Merrimack	Lacrosse	Abby Bertics	MIT	Volleyball	Christina Klouda	Cumberlands (KY)	Swimming
2018–19	Lexi Jacobus	Arkansas	Track & field	Charlie Bertrand	Merrimack	Lacrosse	Abby Bertics	MIT	Volleyball	(Canada) Margaret Pham	British Columbia	Field hockey
2019–20	Justin Herbert	Oregon	Football	Amanda Kautzer	Michigan Tech	Skiing	Bebe Wang	Denison	Swimming	Grace Barry	Concordia (NE)	Basketball
2020–21	Mac Jones	Alabama	Football	Rachel Massaro	Queens (NC)	Swimming	Hanna Hull	Virginia Wesleyan	Softball	(Brazil) Giovanna Tapigliani	Missouri Baptist	Volleyball
2021–22	Aliyah Boston	South Carolina	Basketball	Trevor Bassitt	Ashland	Track & field	Esther Seeland	Messiah	Track & field	(Brazil) Giovanna Tapigliani (2)	Missouri Baptist	Volleyball
2022–23	Caitlin Clark	Iowa	Basketball	John Matocha	Colorado Mines	Football	Kenadee Wayt	Mount Union	Track & field	Mackenzie Selvius	Spring Arbor	Soccer
2023–24	Caitlin Clark	Iowa	Basketball	Samantha Pirosko	Gannon	Basketball	Owen Grover	Wartburg	Football	Grace Beyer	UHSP	Basketball
2024–25	Gretchen Walsh	Virginia	Swimming	Brayden Long	Slippery Rock	Football	Hope Shue	Middlebury	Lacrosse	Tyler Horner	Oregon Tech	Baseball
2025–26	Jasmine Aikey	Stanford	Soccer	Owen Fraser	Missouri S&T	Track & field	Graycee Mosley	East Texas Baptist	Volleyball	Nikki Hahn	SCAD Savannah	Swimming

== See also ==
- Walter Byers Scholarship
