= Jason Krizan =

American baseball player (born 1989)

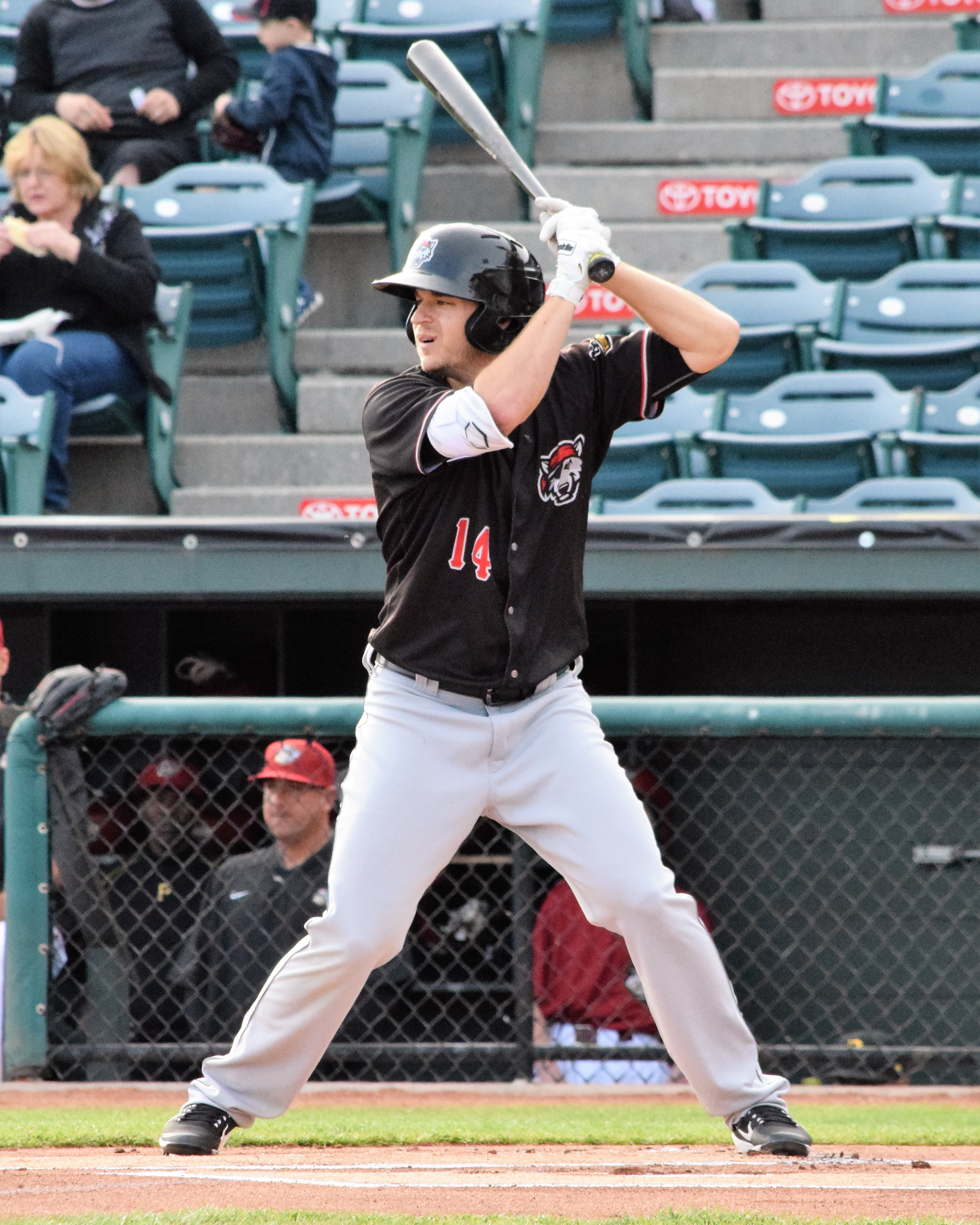
- Krizan with the Erie SeaWolves in 2017
- Third baseman / Left fielder
- Born: June 28, 1989 (age 37); Pflugerville, Texas, U.S.
- Batted: Left Threw: Right

MLB debut
- April 29, 2022, for the San Francisco Giants

Last MLB appearance
- May 1, 2022, for the San Francisco Giants

MLB statistics
- Batting average: .125
- Home runs: 0
- Runs batted in: 0
- Stats at Baseball Reference

Teams
- San Francisco Giants (2022)

Jason William Krizan (born June 28, 1989) is an American former professional baseball left fielder. He played college baseball at Dallas Baptist University, where Krizan was named a First-Team All-American in his senior season. The Detroit Tigers drafted Krizan in the eighth round of the 2011 MLB draft. He played in Major League Baseball (MLB) for the San Francisco Giants. He is currently the hitting coach for the Pensacola Blue Wahoos, the Double-A affiliate of the Miami Marlins.

== Amateur career ==
Krizan attended Pflugerville High School in Pflugerville, Texas. At Pflugerville, he was named to the All-District Baseball Team all four years, the All-Central Texas Baseball Team as a junior in 2006 and as a senior in 2007, and the All-State Baseball Team by the Texas Sports Writers Association as a junior.

Krizan enrolled at Dallas Baptist University, where he played college baseball for the Dallas Baptist Patriots of the National Collegiate Athletic Association's (NCAA) Division I, competing as an independent program. Krizan played collegiate summer baseball for the Pittsfield Dukes of the New England Collegiate Baseball League after the 2008 season, the Waterloo Bucks of the Northwoods League after the 2009 season, and the North Texas Copperheads of the Texas Collegiate League after the 2010 season.

As a senior in 2011, Krizan had a 39-game hitting streak, a Dallas Baptist record. He also set an NCAA Division I record with 39 doubles in 2011, besting the previous record of 36 shared by Brad Hawpe, Damon Thames and Jeremy Morris. He batted .413/.498/.700, leading Division I independents in slugging percentage, doubles, home runs (10), RBIs (81), and OPS (1.199). Krizan led Dallas Baptist to its first NCAA Division I tournament victory. After the season, Krizan was named to the 2011 College Baseball All-America Teams of the American Baseball Coaches Association and Baseball America.

== Professional career ==
=== Detroit Tigers ===
The Detroit Tigers selected Krizan in the eighth round, with the 257th overall selection, of the 2011 Major League Baseball draft, and Krizan signed with the Tigers. He was assigned to the West Michigan Whitecaps of the Single-A Midwest League after he signed.

Krizan played for West Michigan in 2012, batting .244/.333/.337 in 110 games for the team. He played for the Lakeland Flying Tigers of the High-A Florida State League in 2013, hitting 4 home runs with 52 RBI to go along with a .288/.388/.396 slash. He played for the Erie SeaWolves of the Double-A Eastern League in 2014. He ended the year with a .293 batting average, 31 doubles, and 56 runs batted in. He was named the Eastern League Player of the Week for the final week of the season.

The Tigers invited Krizan to spring training in 2015, where the Tigers had him play in the infield with an eye on converting him into a utility player. He began the 2015 season with the Toledo Mud Hens of the Triple-A International League, but was demoted to Erie in May after batting .169 in 71 at bats. He finished the year with a .252/.327/.357 slash between the two clubs.

Krizan began the 2016 season in Erie, hitting .293 with nine home runs and 55 runs batted in 95 games. In July, Krizan won the Double-A Eastern League Home Run Derby with a total of 30 home runs. On August 8, 2016, Krizan returned to Toledo and in 32 games hit .300 with one home run and ten runs batted in. He spent the 2017 season split between Toledo and Erie, hitting .281/.351/.417 with 8 home runs and 51 RBI in 121 games between the two affiliates. He elected free agency on November 6, 2017.

On December 21, 2017, Krizan re-signed with the Tigers on a new minor league contract. He played for Toledo in 2018, posting a .250/.333/.378 slash with 8 home runs and 55 RBI in 106 contests. He elected minor league free agency again following the season on November 2, 2018.

=== New York Mets ===
On December 18, 2018, Krizan signed a minor league contract with the New York Mets organization. He split the 2019 season between the Double-A Binghamton Rumble Ponies and the Triple-A Syracuse Mets, accumulating a .275/.358/.469 slash with a career-high 14 home runs and 65 RBI.

=== San Francisco Giants ===
On December 12, 2019, the Oakland Athletics selected Krizan from the Mets in the minor league phase of the Rule 5 draft. Krizan did not play in a game in 2020 due to the cancellation of the minor league season because of the COVID-19 pandemic. He elected free agency following the season on November 2, 2020.

On November 18, 2020, Krizan signed a minor league contract with the San Francisco Giants organization. He spent the 2021 campaign with the Triple-A Sacramento River Cats, batting .316/.367/.492 with career-highs in home runs (16) and RBI (73) in 110 games for the team. He elected minor league free agency following the season on November 7, 2021. On December 13, Krizan re-signed with the Giants on a new minor league contract, and later received an invitation to spring training. He began the 2022 season with Sacramento.

On April 29, 2022, Krizan was selected to the 40-man roster and promoted to the major leagues for the first time after Brandon Belt and Dominic Leone were placed on the COVID injured list. Krizan made his major league debut the same day, starting at left field, and collected his first major league hit on a single to right field two days later on May 1, 2022, against Washington Nationals starter Josiah Gray. After he batted 1-for-8 in three games, the Giants sent Krizan outright to Sacramento. Playing for Sacramento in 2022, he batted .266/.329/.487 in 357 at bats, and was tied for 8th in the Pacific Coast League in doubles, with 30. He elected free agency following the season on November 10.

== Coaching career ==
=== Chicago White Sox ===
On January 31, 2023, Krizan was named the hitting coach of the Winston-Salem Dash, the High-A affiliate of the Chicago White Sox.

=== Miami Marlins ===
On January 17, 2024, Krizan was named the hitting coach of the Pensacola Blue Wahoos, the Double–A affiliate of the Miami Marlins.

In 2026, he was re-assigned as an assistant hitting coach for the FCL Marlins the Miami Marlins rookie-level affiliate.

== Personal life ==
Krizan married Kristin on November 3, 2018, at First United Methodist church in Sarasota, Florida. They had a son in 2019.
