= Academic All-America =

Student athlete award

- Awarded for: Outstanding Division I, II and III, NAIA, Canadian university, and two-year college scholar-athlete teams in all championship sports
- Country: United States & Canada
- Presented by: College Sports Communicators (2019–Present); CoSIDA/Google Cloud (May 2018–2019); CoSIDA/Capital One (January 2011–2018); CoSIDA/ESPN The Magazine (2004–September 2010); CoSIDA/Verizon (2000–2004); CoSIDA/GTE (1985–2000); CoSIDA/NCAA (1981); CoSIDA (1952–1985)
- First award: 1952
- Final award: present
- Currently held by: Approximately 2000 annually
- Website: AcademicAllAmerica.com

The Academic All-America program is a student-athlete recognition program. The program selects an honorary sports team composed of the most outstanding student-athletes of a specific season for positions in various sports—who in turn are given the honorific "Academic All-American". Since 1952, College Sports Communicators (formerly CoSIDA) has bestowed Academic All-American recognition on male and female athletes in Divisions I, II, and III of the National Collegiate Athletic Association (NCAA) as well as athletes in the NAIA, other U.S. four-year schools, two-year colleges, and Canadian universities, covering all championship sports. The award honors student-athletes who have performed well academically and athletically while regularly competing for their institution.

It was sponsored by and presented as the Google Cloud Academic All-America® Award from 2018 to 2019, and was previously sponsored by Capital One (2011–18), ESPN The Magazine (2004–2010), Verizon (2000–04) and GTE (1985–2000), and is administered by the College Sports Communicators (formerly CoSIDA). The phrases "Academic All-America" and "Academic All-American" are protected trademarks of College Sports Communicators.

Prior to 2011, there were two sets of teams chosen: One for Division I and a College Division that included all other divisions including NAIA, two-year colleges and Canadian schools. In 2011–12, the program was expanded to include four sets of honorary teams: one for each of NCAA Divisions I, II and III as well as a "College Division" for NAIA, four-year U.S. schools that are not NCAA or NAIA members, two-year colleges and Canadian schools. The College Division was further split before the 2018–19 school year with the creation of a separate NAIA division and with the College Division now including all two-year colleges, Canadian institutions and any other school not part of the NCAA or NAIA. In each program, Academic All-District honors are given to all student-athletes with a minimum GPA of 3.5 who also are key starters or reserves. The prestigious Academic All-America teams are voted on by College Sports Communicators members.

== Details ==
=== Domain ===
Currently, College Sports Communicators is responsible for the annual selection of Academic All-Americans in men's soccer, women's soccer, football, volleyball, men's basketball, women's basketball, men's swimming & diving, women's swimming & diving, men's tennis, women's tennis, baseball, softball and men's and women's track and field/cross country. Many other sports are eligible through the At-Large program.

College Sports Communicators has registered a trademark for the name, "Academic All-America" which it uses for its student-athlete recognition program. The Academic All-America program administered by College Sports Communicators is not related to such programs administered or sponsored by coaches' organizations. As a result, cease and desist orders have been granted to protect the trademark at times. Various sports that have similar programs have had to use names such as All-Academic to recognize scholar athletes.

Prior to the relationship with Google Cloud and Capital One, the Academic All-American Award has had other named corporate sponsors such as ESPN, Verizon and Verizon's corporate predecessor GTE who were sponsors from 1985 until the mid-2000s. In 1981, the National Collegiate Athletic Association sponsored the program. From 1985 until the 1999–2000 academic year the honorees were called GTE All-Americans, but during the 2000–01 academic year they became known as Verizon All-Americans when Verizon acquired GTE. Verizon continued to be the named sponsor through the 2003–04 academic year when they did not renew their rights. ESPN the Magazine became the sponsor during the 2004–05 academic year and remained sponsor until September 2010. Fall 2010 teams, continued to bear the ESPN sponsorship name. Capital one took over the sponsorship in January 2011.

=== Process ===
Initially, team selections were composed of both a University Division, made up of Division I participants, and a College Division, made up of Division II, Division III, NAIA, and 2-year colleges. First, second and third team selections are made for both divisions in most Academic All-America programs. However, the football programs only select a first and second team. The football University Division includes both Football Bowl Subdivision and Football Championship Subdivision. In 2011, the program was expanded to incorporate four sets of teams: Division I, Division II, Division III and a College Division that included all U.S. four-year institutions outside the NCAA, two-year colleges and Canadian schools. After the 2018 award cycle, the NAIA was spun off from the College Division, with the College Division now consisting of two-year schools, plus four-year schools in the U.S. and Canada that are not members of the NCAA or NAIA.

Nominations must be made on the College Sports Communicators website by a current dues-paying member with a CSC-issued user name and password for the academic year at issue. Formerly, nominations were made by pen and ink and then with typewritten nominations. The CSC members nominate student-athletes only from the academic institution that they are affiliated with. The nominees must be a starter or important reserve with at least a 3.50 cumulative grade point average (on a 4.0 scale) at his/her current institution. Nominees must have participated in at least 50 percent of the team's games at the position listed on the nomination form (where applicable). In baseball and softball, pitchers must have at least 10.0 innings pitched. Nominees are ineligible until the completion of one full calendar year at his/her current institution and attainment of sophomore athletic eligibility. Transfers, graduate students and two-year college graduates must have completed one full calendar year at the nominating institution to be eligible. Graduate school nominees must have a cumulative GPA of 3.50 or better both as an undergraduate and in graduate school. Except for at-large program, there are no limits in the number of athletes an institution may nominate. In the at-large program, nominations are limited to three per school per gender (a total of five men's at-large candidates and five women's at-large candidates). If an institution participates in both the college and the university divisions, it may nominate a total of five men and five women between the two divisions.

In each program, All-District selections are elected by the CSC membership with the resulting first-team All-District selections advancing to the national ballot for Academic All-America team selections. The national ballot is cast by all College Sports Communicators members plus the Academic All-America Committee and the CSC Board of Directors. Each sport program also recognizes a single athlete for both NCAA Division I, II, II and NAIA who are referred to as Academic All-America Team Member of the Year.

In addition, there is an annual selection by the College Sports Communicators and its Academic All-America sponsor of the individual athlete selected as the most outstanding Academic All-America of the approximately 2000 annual selections. Since the start of the 2018–19 school year, one winner has been chosen for each of four divisions: Division I, Division II, Division III and NAIA. From 2012 to 2018, the non-NCAA division was known as the College Division, and included NAIA members, two-year institutions, U.S. four-year schools that were not NCAA or NAIA members, and Canadian schools. Between 1996 and 2011 one winner each was chosen from both the College and University Divisions' annual selections. Between 1988 and 1995 one winner was chosen per year.

== Team Member of the Year ==
See: List of Academic All-America Team Members of the Year

During the 1987–88 academic year, College Sports Communicators began selecting one student as the most outstanding team member of the year. In 1996, CSC began selecting two outstanding team members yearly, one each from the college division and the university division. In 2011–12, when the program was expanded to include four sets of teams (Division I, Division II, Division III and a College Division), four winners were chosen, one from each division. Starting in 2018–19, a dedicated NAIA team was added.

== History ==
Massachusetts Institute of Technology has had the most Academic All-America selections.

== See also ==
- All-America
- Walter Byers Award
- Elite 90 Award
