= College Sports Communicators =

Organization

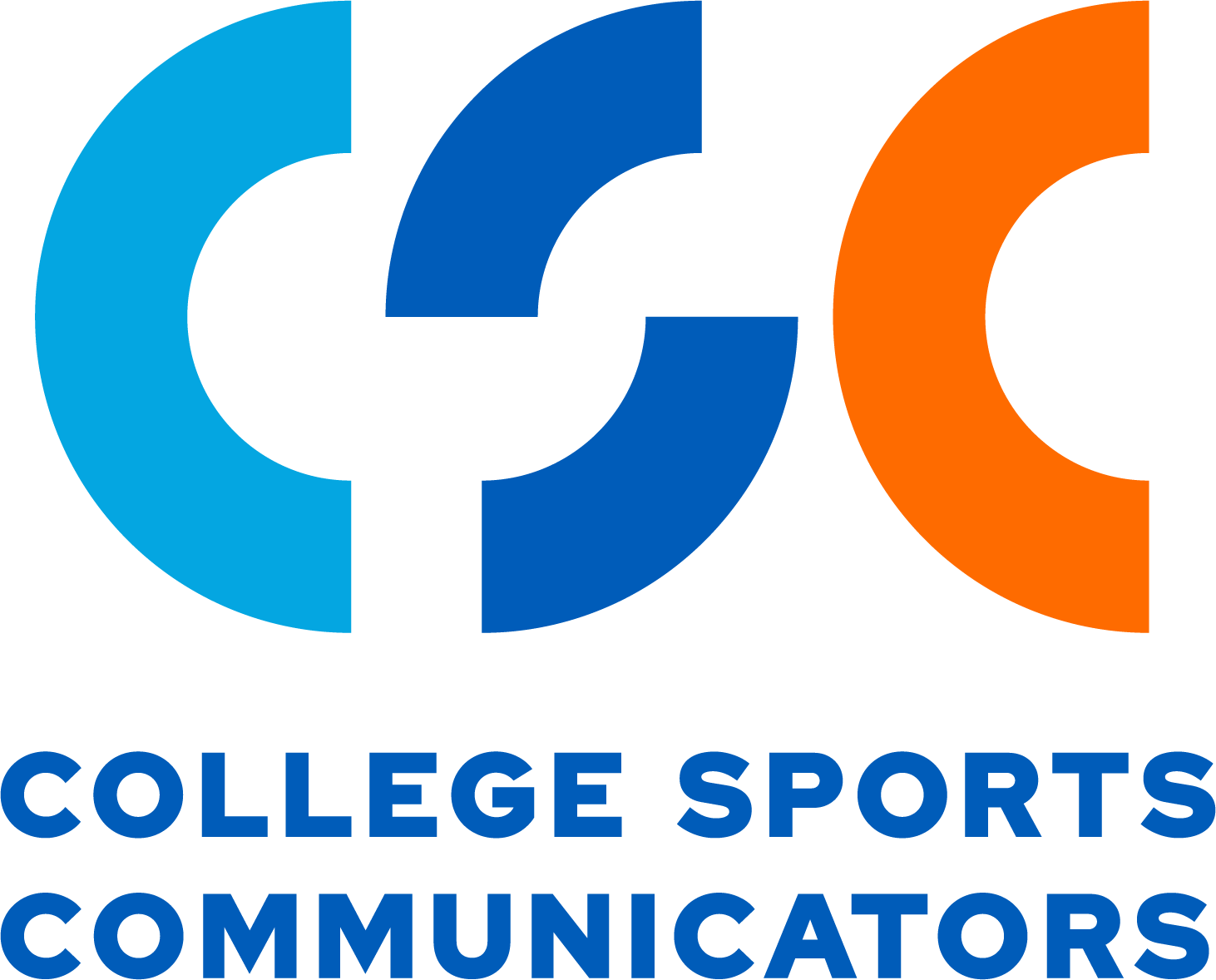
- Abbreviation: CSC
- Formation: 1957; 69 years ago
- Staff: 5 (Erik Christianson, Executive Director)
- Website: CollegeSportsCommunicators.com

College Sports Communicators (CSC) is a membership association for all strategic, creative and digital professionals working in intercollegiate athletics across all levels for colleges, universities and conferences across the United States and Canada. CSC provides year-round leadership, community, professional development, recognition and advocacy for its more than 4,100 members. The organization focused primarily on sports information directors before expanding during the 2022-23 academic year.

CSC offers awards, scholarships, and grants in support of its members and prospective members in the college sports communications industry.

Founded in 1957 as the College Sports Information Directors of America (CoSIDA), the organization rebranded in 2022. CSC hosts an annual convention each June called CSC Unite. It also operates the Academic All-America program and Hall of Fame.

Since 1952, more than 40,000 student-athletes have been recognized with Academic All-America status in all sports (through 2022–23). CSC recognizes male and female student-athletes as Academic All-Americans in Divisions I, II, and III of the National Collegiate Athletic Association (NCAA)—covering all NCAA championship sports—as well as student-athletes from the NAIA, NJCAA, and other Two-Year Colleges and Canadian Institutions.

== History ==
CSC began as a part of the American College Public Relations Association (ACPRA) in 1931. In 1955, a Sports Division of ACPRA began to form. It split and was established as a separate organization for sports information directors in 1957 as College Sports Information Directors of America (CoSIDA). The organization holds an annual conference based around professional development. The first conference was held in Chicago in 1957, where there were 102 attendees. As of 2023 there are over 4,100 members in the United States and Canada.

In 2008, CoSIDA launched a strategic plan to change the image and focus of the organization. Part of the plan was to modify the traditional "Sports Information Director" job title to "Strategic Communicator". Along with this, CoSIDA changed its logo and began to work with the National Association of Collegiate Directors of Athletics (NACDA). Another key point was to have members get better at effective communication strategy, specifically strategic communication. This change is in response to changes in media technology, namely social media.

The organization's name was changed to College Sports Communicators on September 1, 2022 to further change the image and focus of the organization to include creative communications professionals.

== CSC's research on social media ==
A 2012 study, conducted by G. Clayton Stoldt of Wichita State University, surveyed 529 CoSIDA members on how social media had impacted their institutions. Some key results are:

- 92% said that social media changed how their institution communicates
- 89% said social media changed how they handle external communications
- 81% agreed that social media has in some way enhanced public relations practices
- 92% said that social media impacts mainstream media
- 92% also said social media has forced organizations to respond more quickly to crises
- 69% said that social media is less accurate than traditional media, 72% said social media is less credible than traditional media
- 75% said that social media impacts organizations' transparency
- Only 6% knew of any time their institution managed social media based on legality

A separate study in 2016, conducted by CoSIDA and researched by Katelyn Miller of Rutgers University, found that just 33% of institutions had implemented a social media policy and 50% of SIDs had, on at least one occasion, deleted a social media post from a coach or student-athlete.

== Academic All-American selections ==
Since 1952, CSC has selected Academic All-Americans for NCAA Division I, NCAA Division II, NCAA Division III and NAIA. In 2018-19, two-year schools and Canadian institutions were made eligible for at-large All-American selections. The award currently has no corporate sponsor; past sponsors include GTE, Verizon, ESPN The Magazine, Capital One, and Google Cloud.

CSC is responsible for the annual selection of Academic All-Americans in men's and women's soccer, football, volleyball, men's and women's basketball, men's and women's swimming and diving, men's and women's tennis, baseball, softball and men's and women's track and field/cross country. All other sports are grouped into men's and women's At-Large. The sports that CSC recognizes as eligible for at-large Academic All-American recognition included any that have a sponsored national championship by the NCAA or NAIA.

== Dick Enberg Award winners ==
The organization presents the annual Dick Enberg Award to a "person whose actions and commitment have furthered the meaning and reach of the Academic All-America Teams Program and/or the student-athlete while promoting the values of education and academics." Tamika Catchings has been selected as the 2023 recipient.

- 2023: Tamika Catchings, Tennessee / Catch the Stars
- 2022: Patricia Melton, Yale / New Haven Promise
- 2021: Billie Jean King, Cal State LA / Tennis legend/Equality icon
- 2020: Amy Privette Perko, Wake Forest
- 2019: Frank Beamer, Virginia Tech
- 2018: Bill Walton, UCLA
- 2017: Dr. Robert Khayat, University of Mississippi
- 2016: Roger Staubach, NFL Hall of Fame
- 2015: Andre Agassi, Tennis Hall of Fame
- 2014: Ann Meyers Drysdale, UCLA
- 2013: Mike Krzyzewski, Duke
- 2012: Joe Paterno, The Pennsylvania State University
- 2011: Jackie Joyner-Kersee, UCLA
- 2010: Tom Hansen, Pacific-10 Conference
- 2009: Steve Smith, Michigan State
- 2008: Chuck Lee, Verizon
- 2007: Pat Summitt, Tennessee
- 2006: President Gerald Ford, Michigan
- 2005: Father Theodore Hesburgh, Notre Dame
- 2004: Ted Leland, Stanford
- 2003: Tom Osborne, Nebraska
- 2002: Alan Page, Notre Dame
- 2001: Donna Shalala, U. of Miami, Fla.
- 2000: Bill Russell, San Francisco
- 1999: Dean Smith, North Carolina
- 1998: John Humenik, CoSIDA
- 1997: Dick Enberg

== Presidents ==
The following is a listing of past presidents:

- 2022-23: Jessica Poole, Chicago State/Minnesota Aurora FC
- 2021-22: Cindy Potter, Columbia College (Mo.)
- 2020-21: Sam Atkinson, Gallaudet
- 2019-20: Herb Vincent, Southeastern Conference
- 2018-19: Rob Knox, Towson
- 2017-18: Rob Carolla, College Football 150
- 2016-17: Andy Seely, Central Florida
- 2015-16: Judy Willson, Mountain West Conference
- 2014-15: Eric McDowell, Union College (N.Y.)
- 2013-14: Shelly Poe, Auburn
- 2012-13: Joe Hornstein, FIU
- 2011-12: Tom Di Camillo, Pacific West Conference & Central Arizona College
- 2010-11: Larry Dougherty, Temple
- 2009-10: Justin Doherty, Wisconsin
- 2008-09: Nick Joos, Baylor
- 2007-08: Charles Bloom, Southeastern Conference
- 2006-07: Doug Dull, Maryland
- 2005-06: Joe Hernandez, Ball State
- 2004-05: Rod Commons, Washington State
- 2003-04: Tammy Boclair, Vanderbilt
- 2002-03: Alan Cannon, Texas A&M
- 2001-02: Pete Moore, Syracuse
- 2000-01: Fred Stabley Jr., Central Michigan
- 1999-00: Max Corbet, Boise State
- 1998-99: Maxey Parrish, Baylor
- 1997-98: Pete Kowalski, Rutgers
- 1996-97: Jim Vruggink, Purdue
- 1995-96: Rick Brewer, North Carolina
- 1994-95: Hal Cowan, Oregon State
- 1993-94: Doug Vance, Kansas
- 1992-93: Ed Carpenter, Boston University
- 1991-92: George Wine, Iowa
- 1990-91: June Stewart, Vanderbilt
- 1989-90: Arnie Sgalio, Big Sky Conference
- 1988-89: Bill Little, Texas
- 1987-88: Bob Smith, Rutgers
- 1986-87: Roger Valdiserri, Notre Dame
- 1985-86: Jack Zane, Maryland
- 1984-85: Nordy Jenson, Western Athletic Conference
- 1983-84: Bill Whitmore, Rice
- 1982-83: Howie Davis, Massachusetts
- 1981-82: Nick Vista, Michigan State
- 1980-81: Langston Rogers, Delta State
- 1979-80: Dave Schulthess, Brigham Young
- 1978-79: Don Bryant, Nebraska
- 1977-78: Bob Peterson, Minnesota
- 1976-77: Bill Esposito, St. John’s
- 1975-76: Bob Bradley, Clemson
- 1974-75: Hal Bateman, Air Force
- 1973-74: Jones Ramsey, Texas
- 1972-73: Jim Mott, Wisconsin
- 1971-72: Dick Page, Massachusetts
- 1970-71: Elmore Hudgins, Southeastern Conference
- 1969-70: Harry Burrell, Iowa State
- 1968-69: Tom Miller, Indiana
- 1967-68: Bill Young, Wyoming
- 1966-67: Marvin Francis, Wake Forest
- 1965-66: Bob Culp, Western Michigan
- 1965-66: Val Pinchbeck, Syracuse
- 1964-65: Harold Keith, Oklahoma
- 1963-64: Warren Berg, Luther
- 1962-63: Bob Hartley, Mississippi State
- 1961-62: John Cox, Navy
- 1960-61: Marty Reisch, Air Force
- 1959-60: Wilbur Evans, Southwest Athletic Conference
- 1958-59: Fred Stabley Sr., Michigan State
- 1957-58: Ted Mann, Duke

== Conventions ==
The following is a listing of past and future convention sites, including membership and attendance:

Year	Site	Membership	Convention
2029	Orlando (June 10-13)		
2028	Las Vegas (June 25-28)		
2027	Orlando (June 13-16)		
2026	Las Vegas (June 14-17)		
2025	Orlando (June 8-11)		
2024	Las Vegas (June 9-12)		
2023	Orlando (June 11-14	4,123	735
2022	Las Vegas (June 26-29)	3,076	855
2021	Virtual (Orlando canceled) due to Covid 19	2,582	1,111
2020	Virtual (Las Vegas canceled) due to Covid 19	3,255	1,727
2019	Orlando	3,153	975
2018	Washington, D.C.	3,064	1,062
2017	Orlando	3,047	949
2016	Dallas	3,023	926
2015	Orlando	3,071	884
2014	Orlando	3,056	886
2013	Orlando	2,954	852
2012	St. Louis	2,786	859
2011	Marco Island	2,862	727
2010	San Francisco	2,497	614
2009	San Antonio	2,563	553
2008	Tampa	2,397	832
2007	San Diego	2,216	920
2006	Nashville	2,143	726
2005	Philadelphia	1,946	783
2004	Calgary	1,961	496
2003	Cleveland	1,954	780
2002	Rochester	1,888	748
2001	San Diego	1,877	1,065
2000	St. Louis	1,855	980
1999	Orlando	1,839	1,195
1998	Spokane	1,812	609
1997	New Orleans	1,825	1,060
1996	Boston	1,803	1,056
1995	Denver	1,772	903
1994	Chicago	1,804	1,030
1993	Atlanta	1,810	987
1992	Lexington	1,706	989
1991	San Francisco	1,669	915
1990	Houston	1,627	947
1989	Washington, D.C.	1,467	1,122
1988	Kansas City	1,361	855
1987	Portland	1,426	701
1986	Nashville	1,360	836
1985	Boston	1,341	904
1984	St. Louis	1,304	714
1983	San Diego	1,170	610
1982	Dallas	1,077	651
1981	Philadelphia	984	639
1980	Kansas City	944	495
1979	Chicago	593	458
1978	Atlanta	510	415
1977	Los Angeles	550	312
1976	Cincinnati	671	335
1975	Houston	623	303

== See also ==
- National Association of Collegiate Directors of Athletics
