= Student athlete =

Sports competitor who is also in full-time education

Student athlete (or student–athlete) is a term used principally in universities in the United States and Canada to describe students enrolled at postsecondary educational institutions, principally colleges and universities, but also at secondary schools, who participate in organized competitive sports sponsored by that educational institution or school. The term is also interchangeable with the synonymous term "varsity athlete".

The term student-athlete was coined by Walter Byers, the first executive director of the National Collegiate Athletic Association (NCAA). It arose in response to a 1957 worker's compensation case filed by Billie Dwade Dennison, the widow of Ray Dennison, who died while playing football for Fort Lewis A&M (since renamed to Fort Lewis College). As Byers writes in his memoir, the word was designed to avoid the "dreaded notion that NCAA athletes could be identified as employees by state industrial commissions and the courts. We crafted the term student-athlete and soon it was embedded in all NCAA rules and interpretations as a mandated substitute for such words as players and athletes."

== Historical perspective ==
The origins of university sports competitions date back to 19th century Britain. Beginning in the early 20th-century, student organisations in Europe began arranging national and then international athletic events for university students, distinct from the broader Olympic movement. This eventually led to the creation of the International University Sports Federation (FISU) in 1949 and the establishment of the Universiade in 1959, now known as the FISU World University Games, which continues to serve as the principal global championships for student athletes in the 21st century.

== Scholar athletes in England ==
In the mid-19th century, paedagological reformers in the UK, especially in England, such as Thomas Arnold, Headmaster of Rugby, emphasized the importance of English schoolboys from the upper and middle classes developing the spirit, the mind, and the body, which was known as Muscular Christianity.

== Student athletes in the USA ==
Competitive intramural sports were introduced in post-secondary education in the United States in the nineteenth century. The first popular collegiate sport was crew, but American rules football began its reign as the leading collegiate sport in the late 1880s. As interest in football increased, so did injuries incurred in competition. The NCAA was born out of President Theodore Roosevelt's demand to reform college football.

The relationship in the US between US secondary and tertiary educational institutions and US college and US high school sports has been controversial since the 1930s, with media coverage of sports generating significant revenue for schools in broadcast rights for school sports programs and increased enrollment resulting from athletic team success. Concerns about the role of intercollegiate athletics in post-secondary education and the conflicting demands faced by student-athletes remain.

== Athletic scholarships ==
An athletic scholarship is a form of support for tuition, room, board, and related costs awarded to an individual based predominantly on ability in sport. Educational institutions may offer athletic scholarships to potential students that excel in sports and meet specific educational achievement standards. Student-athletes must be amateurs and may not participate in professional competition. Special treatment or incentives beyond the scope of the scholarships themselves are banned. The scholarships generally include academic support such as tutoring and library services.

Scholarships are regulated by organizations such as the National Collegiate Athletic Association (NCAA), the National Association of Intercollegiate Athletics (NAIA) and the National Junior College Athletic Association (NJCAA). They set requirements such as a minimum academic performance for scholarship recipients (typically a grade point average), and a limit to the number of scholarships for players on college rosters. Each level (divisions) have different limits of scholarship money they can give out. Division III can not give out scholarships for athletics though.

=== Scholarships in the NCAA ===
NCAA regulations govern amateur status, and prohibit student-athletes from accepting prize money or compensation or sports agent representation. Prospective student-athletes at NCAA schools have their academic credentials and amateur status certified.

The NCAA Eligibility Center certifies whether prospective college athletes are eligible to play sports at NCAA Division I or II institutions. It reviews the student-athlete's academic record, SAT or ACT scores, and amateur status to ensure conformity with NCAA rules. To be eligible for an athletic scholarship in an NCAA member institution, students must meet four main requirements: 1. Graduate from high school; 2. Complete the required number of core high school courses; 3. Earn a specified minimum GPA on a 4.0 scale in required core academic courses; 4. Achieve a specified minimum SAT or ACT score.

The NCAA has developed prerequisites for potential collegiate athletes based on its division structure:

- To receive an athletic scholarship in an NCAA Division I institution during the first year of college, a student-athlete in high school must complete 16 core-course requirements in eight semesters while earning at least the minimum required grade-point average. The student-athlete must also earn SAT or ACT scores corresponding to the core course grade-point averages and test-score sliding scale. (For example, a 3.000 core-course grade-point average might require at least 620 in the SAT.)
- To enroll in an NCAA Division II college and participate in athletics or receive an athletic scholarship during a student's first year, the student must graduate from high school and complete 16 core courses with a 2.000 grade-point average or better in those courses, and earn a SAT score of 820 or an ACT sum score of 68.
- No athletic scholarships are available at schools in NCAA Division III. Athletic budgets there are significantly lower and standards more straightforward. A student-athlete satisfying the admission requirements for a particular school is eligible to compete in their sport.

The Student Athlete Performance Rating (SAPR) and Academic Progress Rate (APR) are used to measure student-athlete academic performance.

The Academic Progress Rate is an NCAA tool that measures the success of a program's athletes toward graduation. It takes into account academic eligibility and retention. Division I sports teams calculate their student-athletes APRs each academic year; it serves as a predictor of graduation success.

=== Athletic scholarship challenges ===
Gaining access to athletic programs and athletic scholarships can be difficult. Few high school athletes earn college scholarships, and only a small percentage of athletic scholarships cover a student's tuition, room, board, and related expenses. Only about 2% of high school athletes earn an athletic scholarship to an NCAA university and, on average, these scholarships are far less than the average tuition. Only 1% of students get a full ride scholarship. The student athletes must meet the NCAA eligibility standards, and failure to meet these standards and complete academic work can jeopardize the student athlete's ability to compete, receive scholarships, and graduate from the institution at which they are enrolled.

== NIL Deals ==
In 2021 NCAA adopted an interim policy allowing student-athletes to earn compensation from their name, image, and likeness (NIL). This new change in college sports made it so the athletes can earn money from endorsement deals, sponsorships, social media promotions, autograph signings, commercial appearances, and camps or clinics hosted by the athlete.

They are not allowed to pay a athlete for just playing their sport, excessive or unreasonable payments, or compensation with no promotional activity.

NIL deals matter because it has allowed athletes to earn money while remaining eligible. Some athletes are making millions per year, this has definitely reshaped college sports economics, athletic branding, and recruiting.

== The Transfer Portal ==
The NCAA transfer portal is an online database launched on October 15, 2018 that allows college athletes to declare their intent to transfer out of a school. This permits other schools to contact them during the designated transfer windows.

Most college athletes want to transfer for more minutes in the game, a starting role, or a better team to showcase their skills. They might have an issue with their coaches like their coaching style, leadership, communication or philosophy; 56% of athletes who transferred citied that their coaches were the reason. Some just might not like the school environment, had an injury, poor grades, or can't handle the long distance from family.

The transfer portal has changed recruiting to making it faster, more competitive, and more flexible process. Shifting the focus to more experienced transfers while making it more difficult for the high school talent. In 2025, over 14,000 Division I undergraduates transferred, up from 9,760 in 2023, and nearly 27,000 had entered the portal. It is way more common now that it has been around awhile so it is an advantage for all these athletes and coaches.

== Student athlete pressures ==
Student-athletes face distinct challenges, including balancing athletic responsibilities with academic and social responsibilities; balancing athletic success or failure with emotional stability; balancing physical health and injury with the need to continue competing; balancing relationships with coaches, teammates, parents, and friends; and addressing the end of a college athletic career. Student-athletes also face challenges relating to identity, with self-worth often hinging on athletic success.

== Title IX of the U.S. Education Amendments of 1972 ==
Title IX of the Education Amendments of 1972, commonly known simply as Title IX, is a United States law enacted on June 23, 1972, that states: "No person in the United States shall, based on sex, be excluded from participation in, be denied the benefits of, or be subjected to discrimination under any education program or activity receiving Federal financial assistance." Title IX of the Education Amendments of 1972 was designed to balance the amount of money spent on men's and women's sports. The late Sen. Ted Kennedy took a serious interest in women's athletics and was a champion of Title IX. "Over time, he played the leading role in keeping Title IX strong through the Senate, using his stature and his savvy to ensure that it remained strong protection for women in athletics," said Marcia Greenberger, co-president of the National Women's Law Center. "As his leadership in the Senate grew, his responsibility for ensuring that Title IX remained strong and enforced grew. He became the dominant force behind the Civil Rights Restoration Act of 1987, which virtually re-enacted Title IX after a devastating, narrow Supreme Court decision, which among other things, removed Title IX coverage from all intercollegiate athletics; in this country." Greenberger contends that Title IX might not have survived without Kennedy's guardianship, and thus the sports world as it is today might be vastly different. The increased opportunities for female athletes can be witnessed in college and high school athletics programs and, in turn, have helped spawn professional leagues and greater participation and success at the Olympic level.

== Graduation rates for student athletes ==
United States federal law mandates that universities reveal their graduation rates to inform policymakers and constituencies about efforts to support educational attainment for students and athletes. Revealing student-athlete graduation rates helps prospective student-athletes estimate the course load and amount of practice and game time that will occupy their schedules. Universities with more selective admission policies graduate both students and athletes at higher rates, though their athletes graduate at lower rates relative to their student cohorts.

All three levels of competition take a Graduation Success Rate; it analyzes the percentage of athletes who receive a degree from their school. The Graduation Success Rate is different from an ordinary graduation rate in that it fails to include athletes who have transferred from a given school (perhaps because of grades). At the Division I level, the most recent Graduation Success Rate measurement is 86 percent, which is the highest ever. This score is 15 percent better than the initial record in 1984. Overall, athletes graduated at a higher rate than their non-athletic peers. Graduation rates of athletes and non-athletes vary based on demographics. Division II uses the Academic Success Rate, which is different than the Graduation Success Rate used by the Division I level. The Academic Success Rate includes freshman athletes on a team who are not on an athletic scholarship. Division II athletes and Division II non-athletes perform at a relatively similar level.

=== Reason for higher graduation rates ===
The reason that student-athletes appear to have higher graduation rates is not clear. One answer may be that athletes stay on track due to tutors and other academic resources provided to them by their university. Student-athletes are reportedly often discouraged from taking more challenging courses.

== Student athletes after college ==
98% of collegiate athletes do not move on to professional sports after college. Many struggle.

Administrators, teachers, counselors and others may accommodate academic cheating in an effort to ensure academic eligibility or to guarantee college admission. “Unfortunately, those high school/college athletes who have role status and popularity thrust on them may see little need to develop a wide repertoire of interpersonal skills or to augment their educational and vocational skills”. Ultimately this could lead to a lack of rationality when it comes to future goals and objectives.

Fewer than 4% of high school football and basketball players make the transition to the collegiate level, and fewer than 2% of that 4% continue into the professional ranks, making the prospects for continuing in competitive team athletics more an illusion than a realistic option. Despite these data, a significant number of high school athletes continue to view college sport as the minor league experience necessary for entry into professional sports.

=== Graduation rates compared ===
There is a noticeable difference in graduation rates between scholarship and non-scholarship athletes. The athletes who attend school on scholarship have typically fared worse than non-scholarship or partial-scholarship athletes in academic achievement. The table of Demographic and Academic Information for Athletes and the General Student Population reveals that non-athlete students on average have higher GPA's than student athletes. The national average high school GPA for athletes was 2.99, while it was 3.31 for non-athletes. The national average college GPA for student athletes is 2.56 with a national graduation rate of 34.2%; non-athletes average GPAs are slightly higher at 2.74 with a national graduation rate of 46.8%. Analysis of 10 years of graduation rates across all major athletic programs concludes that graduation rates alone are insufficient and misleading unless they account for the widely varying constituencies served by different universities.

=== Student athletes and NCAA compliance ===
Educational institutions in the NCAA are required to comply with the NCAA's rules and regulations, at the risk of serious penalties.

== See also ==
- Academic All-America
- College athletics in the United States
- NCAA Division II
- NCAA Division I
- NCAA Division III
- Student athlete compensation
- U Sports
- University and college sport
- Youth sports
