= List of Illinois State Redbirds men's basketball head coaches =

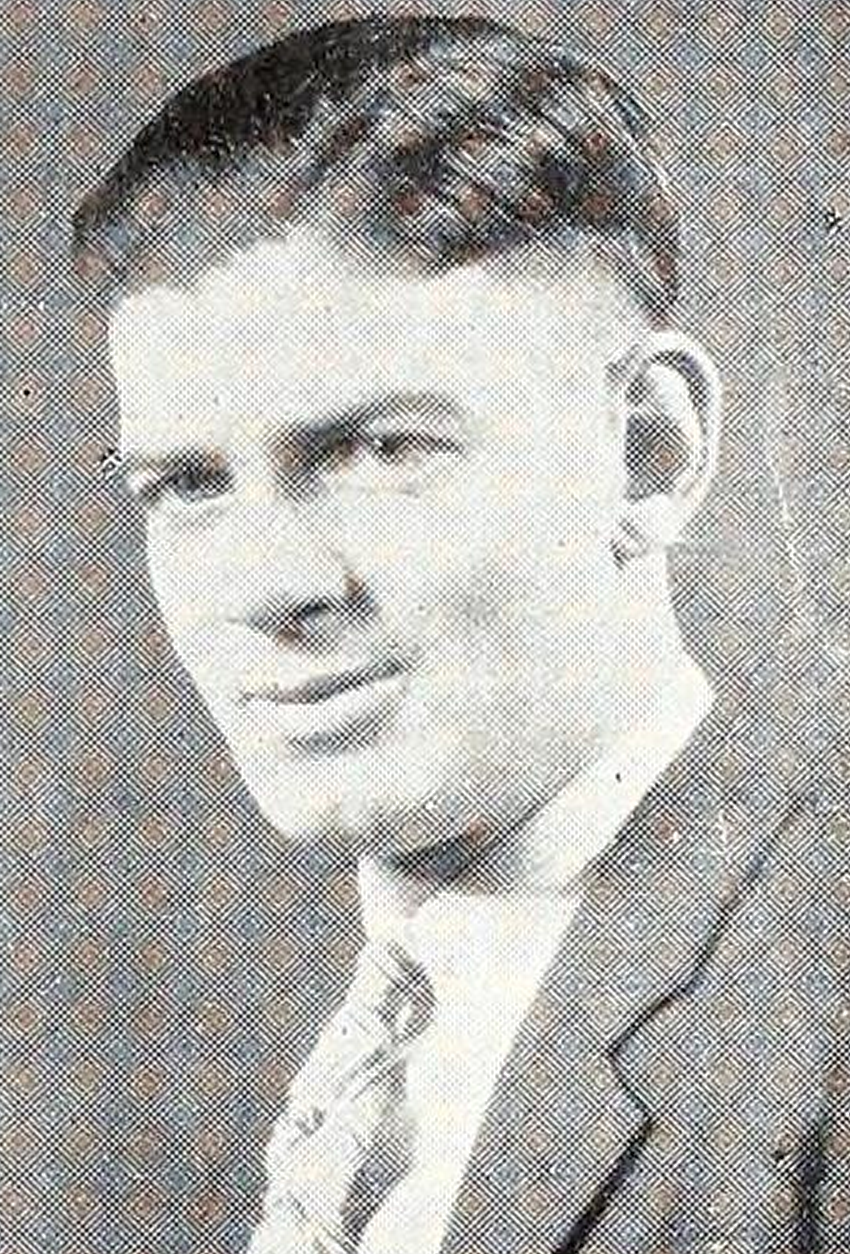
Joe Cogdal, the winningest head coach in Redbirds men's basketball history.

The following is a list of Illinois State Redbirds men's basketball head coaches. There have been 20 head coaches of the Redbirds in their 125-season history.

Illinois State's current head coach is Ryan Pedon. He was hired as the Redbirds' head coach in March 2022, replacing Dan Muller, who was fired during the 2021–22 season.

No.	Tenure	Coach	Years	Record	Pct.
1	1898–1902	B. C. Edwards	4	14–2	.875
2	1902–1906	John P. Stewart	4	20–10	.667
3	1906–1908	William Bawden	2	10–4	.714
4	1908–1910	George Binnewies	2	17–5	.773
5	1910–1923	Harrison Russell	13	89–101	.468
6	1923–1925	Clifford E. Horton	2	8–20	.286
7	1925–1927	Don Karnes	2	9–20	.310
8	1927–1949	Joe Cogdal	22	280–177	.613
9	1949–1957	James Goff	8	97–98	.497
10	1957–1970	James Collie	13	209–139	.601
11	1970–1975	Will Robinson	5	78–51	.605
12	1975–1978	Gene Smithson	3	68–18	.791
13	1978–1989	Bob Donewald	11	208–121	.632
14	1989–1993	Bob Bender	4	60–57	.513
15	1993–1999	Kevin Stallings	6	123–63	.661
16	1999–2003	Tom Richardson	4	56–64	.467
17	2003–2007	Porter Moser	4	51–67	.432
18	2007–2012	Tim Jankovich	5	104–64	.619
19	2012–2022 (Note: Muller was fired on February 14, 2022. Brian Jones was named interim head coach for the remainder of the 2021–22 season.)	Dan Muller	9.79	167–150	.527
–	2022*	Brian Jones	0.21	2–5	.286
20	2022–present	Ryan Pedon	3	45–51	.469
Totals		20 coaches	127 seasons	1,715–1,287	.571
Records updated through end of 2024–25 season * - Denotes interim head coach. Source
