= 2019 Illinois State Redbirds baseball team =

American college baseball season

2019 Illinois State Redbirds baseball

MVC Regular season Champions

NCAA tournament, Louisville Regional (2–2)
- Conference: Missouri Valley Conference
- Record: 36–26 (14–7 MVC)
- Head coach: Steve Holm (1st season)
- Assistant coaches: Wally Crancer (1st season); Matt Lambert (1st season)
- Home stadium: Duffy Bass Field

2019 Missouri Valley Conference baseball standings
	Conf.				Overall
Team	W		L	PCT	W		L	PCT
No. 24 Dallas Baptist ‍†‍‍^{y}	14	–	7	.667	43	–	20	.683
Illinois State ‍†‍‍^{y}	14	–	7	.667	36	–	26	.581
No. 23 Indiana State ‍‍‡‍^{y}	13	–	8	.619	43	–	18	.705
Bradley ‍‍‍	11	–	10	.524	31	–	19	.620
Evansville ‍‍‍	11	–	10	.524	24	–	29	.453
Missouri State ‍‍‍	10	–	11	.476	20	–	36	.357
Valparaiso ‍‍‍	6	–	15	.286	14	–	36	.280
Southern Illinois ‍‍‍	5	–	16	.238	26	–	29	.473
† – Conference champion ‡ – Tournament champion y – Invited to the NCAA tournament As of July 16, 2019; Rankings from D1Baseball

The 2019 Illinois State Redbirds baseball team represented Illinois State University during the 2019 NCAA Division I baseball season. The Redbirds played their home games at Duffy Bass Field as a member of the Missouri Valley Conference. They were led by head coach Steve Holm, in his 1st season at Illinois State.

== Previous season ==
The 2018 Illinois State Redbirds baseball team notched a 22–28 (9–12) regular season record and finished tied for sixth in the MVC Conference standings. The Redbirds reached the 2018 Missouri Valley Conference baseball tournament, where they were defeated by Bradley and Dallas Baptist. Illinois State did not receive an at-large bid to the 2018 NCAA Division I baseball tournament.

== Personnel ==
=== Coaching staff ===
Name	Position	Seasons at Illinois State	Alma mater
Steve Holm	Head coach	1	Oral Roberts University (2001)
Wally Crancer	Assistant Head Coach/Recruiting Coordinator	1	Georgia Institute of Technology (2007)
Matt Lambert	Assistant Coach	1	Illinois State University (2015)

=== Roster ===
2019 Illinois State Redbirds Roster
Pitchers: 21 - Jeff Lindgren - Senior; 22 - Rhett Rapshus - RS Senior; 24 - Mitch Vogrin - RS Senior; 28 - Braden Niksich - Junior; 29 - Michael Sebby - Junior; 30 - Brady Huffman - Junior; 31 - Bryce Konitzer - Freshman; 33 - Matt Walker - Junior; 34 - Sean Sinisko - Freshman; 35 - Brent Headrick - Junior; 36 - Connor Peplow - Sophomore; 37 - Colton Johnson - Junior; 39 - Dalton Harvey - Senior; 41 - Jackson Bronke - Junior; 42 - Jacob Gilmore - RS Sophomore; 43 - Brett Wicklund - Sophomore; 44 - Jack Anderson - Sophomore; 51 - Derek Salata - Freshman	Catchers: 14 - Nick Zouras - Senior; 18 - Clint Wells - Freshman; 26 - Tyson Hayes - Sophomore; Infielders: 2 - Jeremy Gaines - RS Sophomore; 4 - Jake McCaw - Sophomore; 6 - Aidan Huggins - RS Sophomore; 16 - Derek Parola - RS Senior; 17 - Joe Butler - Junior; 27 - Joe Aeilts - Junior; 38 - Ryan Hutchinson - RS Senior; 40 - Tyler Carpenter - Sophomore	Outfielders: 3 - John Rave - Junior; 10 - Jack Butler - RS Sophomore; 15 - Gunner Peterson - Freshman; 25 - Jordan Libman - Junior

== Schedule and results ==
2019 Illinois State Redbirds baseball game log
Regular season (32–22)
February (5–2)

Date	Time (CT)	TV	Opponent	Rank	Stadium	Score	Win	Loss	Save	Attendance	Overall	MVC	
February 15	3:30 pm		at Belmont*		E. S. Rose Park • Nashville, TN	**W** 27–11^{11}	**Gilmore** (1–0)	Bowen (0–1)	–	208	1–0	–	Stats; Story
February 16	1:00 pm		at Belmont*		E. S. Rose Park • Nashville, TN	**W** 14–3	**Lindgren** (1–0)	Brennan (0–1)	–	100	2–0	–	Stats; Story
February 17	1:00 pm		at Belmont*		E. S. Rose Park • Nashville, TN	**W** 10–6	**Walker** (1–0)	Marcotte (0–1)	**Gilmore** (1)	168	3–0	–	Stats; Story
February 23	6:00 pm		at Central Arkansas*		Bear Stadium • Conway, AR	**L** 4–6	Patton (1–0)	**Bronke** (0–1)	–	295	3–1	–	Stats; Story
February 24	1:00 pm		at Central Arkansas*		Bear Stadium • Conway, AR	**W** 8–0	**Lindgren** (2–0)	Callahan (0–2)	–	282	4–1	–	Stats; Story
February 24	4:30 pm		at Central Arkansas*		Bear Stadium • Conway, AR	**L** 1–4	Moyer (1–0)	**Walker** (1–1)	Williams (1)	282	4–2	–	Stats; Story
February 25	12:00 pm		at Central Arkansas*		Bear Stadium • Conway, AR	**W** 6–3	**Gilmore** (2–0)	Patton (1–1)	–	185	5–2	–	Stats; Story

March (8–11)

Date	Time (CT)	TV	Opponent	Rank	Stadium	Score	Win	Loss	Save	Attendance	Overall	MVC	
March 1	1:00 pm		at Murray State*		Reagan Field • Murray, KY	**W** 4–3	**Headrick** (1–0)	McMurray (0–2)	**Gilmore** (2)	64	6–2	–	Stats; Story
March 1	4:00 pm		at Murray State*		Reagan Field • Murray, KY	**L** 4–5	Hayes (1–0)	**Bronke** (0–2)	–	74	6–3	–	Stats; Story
March 2	1:00 pm		at Murray State*		Reagan Field • Murray, KY	**W** 9–5	**Johnson** (1–0)	Hayes (1–1)	**Gilmore** (3)	123	7–3	–	Stats; Story
March 8	4:30 pm		at #2 Vanderbilt*		Hawkins Field • Nashville, TN	**L** 4–10	Fellows (3–0)	**Headrick** (1–1)	Brown (2)	2,694	7–4	–	Stats; Story
March 10	12:00 pm		at #2 Vanderbilt*		Hawkins Field • Nashville, TN	**L** 1–9	Raby (3–0)	**Lindgren** (2–1)	Fisher (1)	2,866	7–5	–	Stats; Story
March 10	3:30 pm		at #2 Vanderbilt*		Hawkins Field • Nashville, TN	**W** 7–3	**Johnson** (2–0)	King (0–1)	**Gilmore** (4)		8–5	–	Stats; Story
March 12	3:00 pm		at Southeast Missouri State*		Capaha Field • Cape Girardeau, MO	**W** 18–6	**Wicklund** (1–0)	Spalt (0–1)	–	211	9–5	–	Stats; Story
March 13	4:00 pm		at SIU Edwardsville*		Simmons Baseball Complex • Edwardsville, IL	**W** 16–9	**Peplow** (1–0)	Byrd (0–1)	–	101	10–5	–	Stats; Story
March 16	1:00 pm	ESPN3	Central Michigan*		Duffy Bass Field • Normal, IL	**W** 7–2	**Johnson** (3–0)	Kohn (2–3)	–		11–5	–	Stats; Story
March 16	4:40 pm		Central Michigan*		Duffy Bass Field • Normal, IL	**W** 5–4	**Anderson** (1–0)	Miller (0–1)	**Gilmore** (5)	196	12–5	–	Stats; Story
March 17	1:00 pm	ESPN3	Central Michigan*		Duffy Bass Field • Normal, IL	**L** 2–11	Hankins (3–0)	**Walker** (1–2)	–	258	12–6	–	Stats; Story
March 19	5:00 pm	ESPN+	UIC*		Duffy Bass Field • Normal, IL	**W** 4–0	**Wicklund** (2–0)	Toikka (1–2)	–	245	13–6	–	Stats; Story
March 22	4:00 pm		at #23 Illinois*		Illinois Field • Champaign, IL	**L** 3–14	Fisher (3–1)	**Headrick** (1–2)	–	751	13–7	–	Stats; Story
March 23	1:00 pm		at #23 Illinois*		Illinois Field • Champaign, IL	**L** 2–4	Weber (1–0)	**Lindgren** (2–2)	Acton (8)	1,573	13–8	–	Stats; Story
March 24	12:00 pm		at #23 Illinois*		Illinois Field • Champaign, IL	**L** 1–12	Lavender (1–1)	**Walker** (1–3)	–	661	13–9	–	Stats; Story
March 26	6:00 pm	ESPN+	Milwaukee*		Duffy Bass Field • Normal, IL	**L** 3–6	McIntosh (3–0)	**Wicklund** (2–1)	Sommers (4)	346	13–10	–	Stats; Story
March 30	2:00 pm		at Creighton*		TD Ameritrade Park • Omaha, NE	**L** 3–17	Ragan (4–1)	**Headrick** (1–3)	–	1,137	13–11	–	Stats; Story
March 31	12:00 pm		at Creighton*		TD Ameritrade Park • Omaha, NE	**L** 7–8^{11}	Sakowski (2–0)	**Gilmore** (2–1)	–		13–12	–	Stats; Story
March 31	4:00 pm		at Creighton*		TD Ameritrade Park • Omaha, NE	**L** 3–7	Johnson (3–0)	**Walker** (1–4)	–		13–13	–	Stats; Story

April (14–4)

Date	Time (CT)	TV	Opponent	Rank	Stadium	Score	Win	Loss	Save	Attendance	Overall	MVC	
April 2	5:00 pm	ESPN+	Eastern Illinois*		Duffy Bass Field • Normal, IL	**W** 3–0	**Wicklund** (3–1)	Wolfe (1–2)	–	281	14–13	–	Stats; Story
April 3	4:05 pm		at Iowa*		Duane Banks Field • Iowa City, IA	**W** 11–6	**Vogrin** (1–0)	Wallace (1–1)	–	427	15–13	–	Stats; Story
April 5	3:00 pm		at Valparaiso		Emory G. Bauer Field • Valparaiso, IN	**W** 13–1	**Headrick** (2–3)	Tieman (1–5)	–	159	16–13	1–0	Stats; Story
April 6	1:00 pm		at Valparaiso		Emory G. Bauer Field • Valparaiso, IN	**W** 12–6	**Lindgren** (3–2)	Fields (2–3)	–		17–13	2–0	Stats; Story
April 6	3:30 pm		at Valparaiso		Emory G. Bauer Field • Valparaiso, IN	**L** 2–4	Hammel (1–3)	**Walker** (1–5)	Rhodehouse (2)	213	17–14	2–1	Stats; Story
April 9	5:00 pm	ESPN+	Illinois*		Duffy Bass Field • Normal, IL	**W** 7–6^{13}	**Anderson** (2–0)	Acton (1–2)	–	989	18–14	–	Stats; Story
April 12	5:00 pm	ESPN+	Missouri State		Duffy Bass Field • Normal, IL	**W** 7–1	**Headrick** (3–3)	Lochner (2–1)	–	404	19–14	3–1	Stats; Story
April 13	1:00 pm		Missouri State		Duffy Bass Field • Normal, IL	**W** 7–5	**Johnson** (4–0)	Sechler (2–3)	–		20–14	4–1	Stats; Story
April 13	4:30 pm		Missouri State		Duffy Bass Field • Normal, IL	**W** 5–3	**Walker** (2–5)	Schwab (1–4)	**Gilmore** (6)	512	21–14	5–1	Stats; Story
April 16	6:00 pm		at UIC*		Curtis Granderson Stadium • Chicago, IL	**L** 1–6	Toikka (2–2)	**Wicklund** (3–2)	–	204	21–15	–	Stats; Story
April 17	5:00 pm	ESPN+	Sacramento State*		Duffy Bass Field • Normal, IL	**W** 2–1	**Vogrin** (2–0)	Martizia (2–1)	**Gilmore** (7)	571	22–15	–	Stats; Story
April 19	6:30 pm		at Southern Illinois		Itchy Jones Stadium • Carbondale, IL	**W** 7–4	**Headrick** (4–3)	Hiser (3–2)	**Gilmore** (8)	192	23–15	6–1	Stats; Story
April 20	2:00 pm		at Southern Illinois		Itchy Jones Stadium • Carbondale, IL	**W** 7–6	**Lindgren** (4–2)	Givens (3–5)	**Gilmore** (9)	466	24–15	7–1	Stats; Story
April 21	1:00 pm		at Southern Illinois		Itchy Jones Stadium • Carbondale, IL	**W** 8–4	**Walker** (3–5)	Begner (3–5)	**Johnson** (1)	246	25–15	8–1	Stats; Story
April 23	5:00 pm	ESPN+	Northern Illinois*		Duffy Bass Field • Normal, IL	**W** 10–2	**Wicklund** (4–3)	Walker (0–1)	–	291	26–15	–	Stats; Story
April 26	6:30 pm		at Dallas Baptist		Horner Ballpark • Dallas, TX	**W** 9–8	**Headrick** (5–3)	Martinson (5–3)	**Gilmore** (10)	1,184	27–15	9–1	Stats; Story
April 27	2:00 pm		at Dallas Baptist		Horner Ballpark • Dallas, TX	**L** 3–13	Johnson (7–1)	**Lindgren** (4–3)	–	1,000	27–16	9–2	Stats; Story
April 28	12:00 pm		at Dallas Baptist		Horner Ballpark • Dallas, TX	**L** 4–11	Bayless (6–1)	**Walker** (3–6)	–	648	27–17	9–3	Stats; Story

May (5–5)

Date	Time (CT)	TV	Opponent	Rank	Stadium	Score	Win	Loss	Save	Attendance	Overall	MVC	
May 1	3:30 pm		at Northwestern*		Rocky Miller Park • Evanston, IL	**L** 3–6	Paciorek (3–1)	**Johnson** (4–1)	Levy (1)	167	27–18	–	Stats; Story
May 3	5:00 pm	ESPN+	Indiana State		Duffy Bass Field • Normal, IL	**W** 4–3	**Headrick** (6–3)	Grauer (2–3)	–	316	28–18	10–3	Stats; Story
May 4	2:00 pm	ESPN+	Indiana State		Duffy Bass Field • Normal, IL	**L** 1–13	Liberatore (9–0)	**Lindgren** (4–4)	–	554	28–19	10–4	Stats; Story
May 5	1:00 pm	ESPN+	Indiana State		Duffy Bass Field • Normal, IL	**L** 1–6	Whitbread (6–1)	**Walker** (3–7)	Ward (5)	368	28–20	10–5	Stats; Story
May 10	6:00 pm		at Bradley		Dozer Park • Peoria, IL	**W** 1–0	**Headrick** (7–3)	Janssen (4–2)	**Johnson** (2)	398	29–20	11–5	Stats; Story
May 11	6:00 pm		at Bradley		Dozer Park • Peoria, IL	**W** 14–1	**Walker** (4–7)	Olson (1–1)	–	210	30–20	12–5	Stats; Story
May 12	1:00 pm		at Bradley		Dozer Park • Peoria, IL	**L** 2–7	Lund (5–3)	**Wicklund** (4–3)	–	315	30–21	12–6	Stats; Story
May 16	5:00 pm		Evansville		Duffy Bass Field • Normal, IL	**W** 11–2	**Headrick** (8–3)	Lukas (5–5)	–	305	31–21	13–6	Stats; Story
May 17	5:00 pm	ESPN+	Evansville		Duffy Bass Field • Normal, IL	**L** 8–11	Hayden (3–2)	**Walker** (4–8)	Allinger (6)	382	31–22	13–7	Stats; Story
May 18	12:00 pm	ESPN+	Evansville		Duffy Bass Field • Normal, IL	**W** 11–4	**Lindgren** (5–4)	Weigand (2–6)	–	357	32–22	14–7	Stats; Story

Postseason (4–4)
MVC Tournament (2–2)

Date	Time (CT)	TV	Opponent	Rank	Stadium	Score	Win	Loss	Save	Attendance	Overall	MVC	
May 22	3:00 pm	ESPN+	(8) Southern Illinois	(2)	Duffy Bass Field • Normal, IL	**W** 4–1	**Headrick** (9–3)	Hiser (4–4)	**Johnson** (3)		33–22	–	Stats; Story
May 23	7:00 pm	ESPN+	(3) Indiana State	(2)	Duffy Bass Field • Normal, IL	**W** 10–7	**Anderson** (3–0)	Ward (5–3)	**Gilmore** (11)	694	34–22	–	Stats; Story
May 24	3:00 pm	ESPN+	(1) Dallas Baptist	(2)	Duffy Bass Field • Normal, IL	**L** 7–9	Fouse (5–0)	**Vogrin** (2–1)	Carraway (4)		34–23	–	Stats; Story
May 24	9:00 pm	ESPN+	(3) Indiana State	(2)	Duffy Bass Field • Normal, IL	**L** 6–10	Ward (6–3)	**Wicklund** (4–4)	–		34–24	–	Stats; Story

NCAA tournament (2–2)

Date	Time (CT)	TV	Opponent	Rank	Stadium	Score	Win	Loss	Save	Attendance	Overall	MVC	
May 31	1:00 pm	ESPN3	(2) Indiana	(3)	Jim Patterson Stadium • Louisville, KY	**W** 8–7	**Harvey** (1–0)	Manous (1–1)	–	1,227	35–24	–	Stats; Story
June 1	3:00 pm	ESPN3	at (1) Louisville	(3)	Jim Patterson Stadium • Louisville, KY	**W** 4–2	**Walker** (5–8)	Detmers (11–4)	–	2,843	36–24	–	Stats; Story
June 2	5:00 pm	ESPN3	at (1) Louisville	(3)	Jim Patterson Stadium • Louisville, KY	**L** 2–11	Smith (6–0)	**Lindgren** (5–5)	–	2,345	36–25	–	Stats; Story
June 3	12:00 pm	ESPN2	at (1) Louisville	(3)	Jim Patterson Stadium • Louisville, KY	**L** 3–4	Kirian (3–1)	**Gilmore** (2–2)	–	2,878	36–26	–	Stats; Story

Legend: = Win = Loss Bold = Illinois State team member
"#" represents ranking. All rankings from Collegiate Baseball on the date of the contest.
"()" represents postseason seeding in the MVC Tournament or NCAA Regional, respectively.
