= 2019 Missouri Valley Conference baseball tournament =

Postseason collegiate baseball tournament

- Teams: 8
- Format: Double-elimination
- Finals site: Duffy Bass Field; Normal, Illinois
- Champions: Indiana State (7th title)
- Winning coach: Mitch Hannahs (1st title)
- Television: ESPN+

2019 Missouri Valley Conference baseball standings
	Conf.				Overall
Team	W		L	PCT	W		L	PCT
No. 24 Dallas Baptist ‍†‍‍^{y}	14	–	7	.667	43	–	20	.683
Illinois State ‍†‍‍^{y}	14	–	7	.667	36	–	26	.581
No. 23 Indiana State ‍‍‡‍^{y}	13	–	8	.619	43	–	18	.705
Bradley ‍‍‍	11	–	10	.524	31	–	19	.620
Evansville ‍‍‍	11	–	10	.524	24	–	29	.453
Missouri State ‍‍‍	10	–	11	.476	20	–	36	.357
Valparaiso ‍‍‍	6	–	15	.286	14	–	36	.280
Southern Illinois ‍‍‍	5	–	16	.238	26	–	29	.473
† – Conference champion ‡ – Tournament champion y – Invited to the NCAA tournament As of July 16, 2019; Rankings from D1Baseball

The 2019 Missouri Valley Conference baseball tournament was held from May 22 through 25. All eight baseball-sponsoring schools in the conference participated in the double-elimination tournament held at Illinois State's Duffy Bass Field in Normal, Illinois. The winner of the tournament, Indiana State, earned the conference's automatic bid to the 2019 NCAA Division I baseball tournament.

== Seeding and format ==
The league's eight teams were seeded based on conference winning percentage. The four lowest seeded teams played in a single elimination round, with the two winners advancing to the six-team double-elimination bracket.

== Results ==
=== Play-In Round ===
Team	R
#6 Missouri State	7
#7 Valparaiso	1

Team	R
#5 Bradley	4
#8 Southern Illinois	7

=== Double-Elimination Rounds ===
First round
1	Dallas Baptist	1
6	Missouri State	0
2	Illinois State	4
8	Southern Illinois	1
3	Indiana State	7
4	Evansville	0

Second round
1	Dallas Baptist	9
4	Evansville	2
2	Illinois State	10
3	Indiana State	7
6	Missouri State	9
8	Southern Illinois	10

Third round
1	Dallas Baptist	9
2	Illinois State	7
3	Indiana State	4
8	Southern Illinois	1

Semifinals
2	Illinois State	6
3	Indiana State	10

Final
1	Dallas Baptist	5	3
3	Indiana State	9	16^{8}

== Conference championship ==
Missouri Valley Championship
(1) Dallas Baptist Patriots	vs.	(3) Indiana State Sycamores

May 25, 2019, 2:00 p.m. (CDT) at Duffy Bass Field in Normal, Illinois
Team	1	2	3	4	5	6	7	8	9	R	H	E
(1) Dallas Baptist	1	1	2	0	0	0	1	0	0	5	7	0
(3) Indiana State	0	2	1	1	0	2	0	3	X	9	9	0
WP: Austin Moralis (1–0) LP: Cole Reeves (1–1) Sv: Tyler Grauer (8); Home runs: DBU: Evan Sandmann; Blayne Jones; Andres Sosa; ISU: Chris Ayers

May 25, 2019, 6:15 p.m. (CDT) at Duffy Bass Field in Normal, Illinois
Team	1	2	3	4	5	6	7	8	R	H	E
(3) Indiana State	6	0	3	1	0	0	0	6	16	16	1
(1) Dallas Baptist	0	0	0	1	0	0	0	2	3	6	0
WP: Jake Ridgway (2–0) LP: Parker Towns (2–2); Home runs: ISU: Clay Dungan; Roby Enriquez; CJ Huntley; DBU: None
