= 2019 Dallas Baptist Patriots baseball team =

American college baseball season

2019 Dallas Baptist Patriots baseball

MVC Regular season Champion

NCAA tournament, Lubbock Regional Final
- Conference: Missouri Valley Conference
- Record: 43–20 (14–7 MVC)
- Head coach: Dan Heefner (12th season)
- Assistant coaches: Dan Fitzgerald (7th season); Josh Hopper (1st season); Trevin Sonnier (2nd season)
- Home stadium: Horner Ballpark

2019 Missouri Valley Conference baseball standings
	Conf.				Overall
Team	W		L	PCT	W		L	PCT
No. 24 Dallas Baptist ‍†‍‍^{y}	14	–	7	.667	43	–	20	.683
Illinois State ‍†‍‍^{y}	14	–	7	.667	36	–	26	.581
No. 23 Indiana State ‍‍‡‍^{y}	13	–	8	.619	43	–	18	.705
Bradley ‍‍‍	11	–	10	.524	31	–	19	.620
Evansville ‍‍‍	11	–	10	.524	24	–	29	.453
Missouri State ‍‍‍	10	–	11	.476	20	–	36	.357
Valparaiso ‍‍‍	6	–	15	.286	14	–	36	.280
Southern Illinois ‍‍‍	5	–	16	.238	26	–	29	.473
† – Conference champion ‡ – Tournament champion y – Invited to the NCAA tournament As of July 16, 2019; Rankings from D1Baseball

The 2019 Dallas Baptist Patriots baseball team represented Dallas Baptist University during the 2019 NCAA Division I baseball season. The Patriots played their home games at Horner Ballpark as a member of the Missouri Valley Conference. They were led by head coach Dan Heefner, in his 12th season at Dallas Baptist.

== Previous season ==
The 2018 Dallas Baptist Patriots baseball team notched a 36–17 (16–5) regular season record and finished second in the Missouri Valley Conference standings. The Patriots reached the finals of the 2018 Missouri Valley Conference baseball tournament, where they were defeated by Missouri State in 10 innings. Dallas Baptist received an at-large bid to the 2019 NCAA Division I baseball tournament. The Patriots were eliminated from the NCAA tournament by Arkansas in the Fayetteville Regional.

== Personnel ==
=== Coaching staff ===
Name	Position	Seasons at Dallas Baptist	Alma mater
Dan Heefner	Head coach	12	Olivet Nazarene University (2001)
Dan Fitzgerald	Associate head coach - Recruiting Coordinator	7	University of Minnesota (2000)
Josh Hopper	Assistant Coach - Pitching	1	Berry College (1999)
Trevin Sonnier	Assistant Coach	2	Oral Roberts University (2016)

=== Roster ===
2019 Dallas Baptist Patriots Roster
Pitchers: 8 - Travis Stone - RS Senior; 9 - JT Penick - Sophomore; 15 - MacGregor Hines - RS Senior; 17 - Luke Trahan - Freshman; 20 - Ray Gaither - RS Sophomore; 26 - Luke Eldred - RS Sophomore; 28 - Burl Carraway - Sophomore; 30 - Jordan Martinson - Senior; 32 - Kragen Kechely - Junior; 33 - Jarod Bayless - Senior; 34 - MD Johnson - Senior; 36 - Cole Reeves - Sophomore; 37 - Tim Ewald - Freshman; 38 - Jimmy Fouse - Senior; 39 - Reagan MacDonald - RS Junior; 41 - Peyton Sherlin - Sophomore; 44 - Kyle Rich - Freshman; 45 - Parker Towns - Senior; 46 - Zach Heaton - RS Freshman; 47 - Alec Baker - Freshman	Catchers: 7 - Herbert Iser - Junior; 12 - Christian Boulware - Junior; 16 - Treet Williams - Freshman; Infielders: 1 - Andres Sosa - Junior; 2 - Blayne Jones - Sophomore; 4 - Augie Isaacson - RS Senior; 6 - Hayden Ebrecht - Freshman; 13 - Jimmy Glowenke - Sophomore; 18 - Trevor Hatton - Freshman; 19 - Jackson Glenn - Junior; 27 - Jose Gutierrez - Freshman; 29 - Bryce Ball - Junior; 42 - Luke Bandy - Junior	Outfielders: 3 - Hunter Vansau - RS Senior; 5 - Austin Bell - RS Junior; 14 - Ben McConnell - Junior; 25 - Evan Sandmann - RS Senior

== Schedule and results ==
2019 Dallas Baptist Patriots baseball game log
Regular season (38–16)
February (5–3)

Date	Time (CT)	TV	Opponent	Rank	Stadium	Score	Win	Loss	Save	Attendance	Overall	MVC	
February 15	6:30 pm		Kent State*		Horner Ballpark • Dallas, TX	**W** 3–0	**Martinson** (1–0)	Wollersheim (0–1)	**Bayless** (1)	1,044	1–0	–	Stats; Story
February 16	2:00 pm		Kent State*		Horner Ballpark • Dallas, TX	**W** 8–4	**Towns** (1–0)	Matthews (0–1)	–	542	2–0	–	Stats; Story
February 17	12:00 pm		Kent State*		Horner Ballpark • Dallas, TX	**W** 8–1	**Johnson** (1–0)	Schreiber (0–1)	–	482	3–0	–	Stats; Story
February 20	3:00 pm		at Oklahoma*		L. Dale Mitchell Baseball Park • Norman, OK	**L** 2–4	Abram (1–0)	**Towns** (1–1)	Matthews (1)	409	3–1	–	Stats; Story
February 22	6:30 pm		Minnesota*		Horner Ballpark • Dallas, TX	**W** 9–0	**Martinson** (2–0)	Lackney (0–1)	–	496	4–1	–	Stats; Story
February 23	2:00 pm		Minnesota*		Horner Ballpark • Dallas, TX	**L** 7–9	Fredrickson (1–1)	**Eldred** (0–1)	Meyer (2)	742	4–2	–	Stats; Story
February 24	1:00 pm		Minnesota*		Horner Ballpark • Dallas, TX	**W** 7–5	**Johnson** (2–0)	Thoresen (0–2)	–	401	5–2	–	Stats; Story
February 26	6:35 pm		at #14 Baylor*		Baylor Ballpark • Waco, TX	**L** 4–10	Leckich (2–0)	**Kechely** (0–1)	–	1,388	5–3	–	Stats; Story

March (16–3)

Date	Time (CT)	TV	Opponent	Rank	Stadium	Score	Win	Loss	Save	Attendance	Overall	MVC	
March 1	3:00 pm		Houston Baptist*		Horner Ballpark • Dallas, TX	**W** 7–1	**Martinson** (3–0)	Carter (1–1)	**Kechely** (1)	220	6–3	–	Stats; Story
March 1	6:00 pm		Houston Baptist*		Horner Ballpark • Dallas, TX	**W** 2–1	**Bayless** (1–0)	Newton (0–1)	–	402	7–3	–	Stats; Story
March 2	1:00 pm		Houston Baptist*		Horner Ballpark • Dallas, TX	**W** 12–2	**Johnson** (3–0)	Batten (0–1)	–	447	8–3	–	Stats; Story
March 6	3:00 pm		#25 Oklahoma*		Horner Ballpark • Dallas, TX	**W** 7–2	**Carraway** (1–0)	Matthews (0–1)	–	569	9–3	–	Stats; Story
March 8	6:00 pm		at Oral Roberts*		J. L. Johnson Stadium • Tulsa, OK	**W** 13–8	**Martinson** (4–0)	McMinn (2–2)	–	943	10–3	–	Stats; Story
March 9	2:00 pm		at Oral Roberts*		J. L. Johnson Stadium • Tulsa, OK	**W** 13–6	**Carraway** (2–0)	Gaskins (1–1)	–	984	11–3	–	Stats; Story
March 10	1:00 pm		at Oral Roberts*		J. L. Johnson Stadium • Tulsa, OK	**W** 6–2	**Bayless** (2–0)	Wolf (0–1)	–	742	12–3	–	Stats; Story
March 12	6:30 pm		#21 Texas A&M*		Horner Ballpark • Dallas, TX	**W** 5–4	**Hines** (1–0)	Jozwiak (2–1)	**Carraway** (1)	2,047	13–3	–	Stats; Story
March 15	6:30 pm		Houston*		Horner Ballpark • Dallas, TX	**L** 6–8	Henry (1–0)	**Hines** (1–1)	Roedahl (2)	871	13–4	–	Stats; Story
March 16	2:00 pm		Houston*		Horner Ballpark • Dallas, TX	**L** 0–2	Villarreal (2–0)	**Johnson** (3–1)	–	893	13–5	–	Stats; Story
March 17	1:00 pm		Houston*		Horner Ballpark • Dallas, TX	**W** 8–4	**Bayless** (3–0)	Roedahl (3–1)	–	794	14–5	–	Stats; Story
March 19	6:30 pm		Oklahoma State*		Horner Ballpark • Dallas, TX	**W** 7–5	**Carraway** (3–0)	Battenfield (3–2)	**Hines** (1)	962	15–5	–	Stats; Story
March 22	4:00 pm		at Air Force*		Falcon Baseball Field • Colorado Springs, CO	**W** 4–3^{12}	**Hines** (2–1)	Price (3–1)	**Kechely** (2)	66	16–5	–	Stats; Story
March 23	2:00 pm		at Air Force*		Falcon Baseball Field • Colorado Springs, CO	**W** 6–5	**Bayless** (4–0)	Chilcutt (0–2)	**Kechely** (3)	117	17–5	–	Stats; Story
March 24	1:00 pm		at Air Force*		Falcon Baseball Field • Colorado Springs, CO	**W** 30–7	**Fouse** (1–0)	Nichols (1–2)	–	127	18–5	–	Stats; Story
March 26	6:30 pm		UT Arlington*		Horner Ballpark • Dallas, TX	**L** 0–9	Gooch (1–2)	**Kechely** (0–2)	–	837	18–6	–	Stats; Story
March 29	6:30 pm		Valparaiso		Horner Ballpark • Dallas, TX	**W** 10–5	**Martinson** (5–0)	Tieman (1–4)	–	831	19–6	1–0	Stats; Story
March 30	2:00 pm		Valparaiso		Horner Ballpark • Dallas, TX	**W** 10–5	**Johnson** (4–1)	Fields (2–2)	–	552	20–6	2–0	Stats; Story
March 31	1:00 pm		Valparaiso		Horner Ballpark • Dallas, TX	**W** 6–1	**Fouse** (2–0)	Fricke (0–2)	–	493	21–6	3–0	Stats; Story

April (10–7)

Date	Time (CT)	TV	Opponent	Rank	Stadium	Score	Win	Loss	Save	Attendance	Overall	MVC	
April 2	6:30 pm		#22 Baylor*		Horner Ballpark • Dallas, TX	**L** 1–5	Helmer (1–0)	**Kechely** (0–3)	–	1,694	21–7	–	Stats; Story
April 5	6:00 pm		at Evansville		Charles H. Braun Stadium • Evansville, IN	**L** 3–8	Lukas (4–2)	**Carraway** (3–1)	Parks (4)	237	21–8	3–1	Stats; Story
April 6	1:00 pm		at Evansville		Charles H. Braun Stadium • Evansville, IN	**L** 5–11	Gray (2–0)	**Bayless** (4–1)	–	232	21–9	3–2	Stats; Story
April 6	5:00 pm		at Evansville		Charles H. Braun Stadium • Evansville, IN	**W** 4–3	**Heaton** (1–0)	Weigand (2–3)	**Hines** (2)	232	22–9	4–2	Stats; Story
April 9	6:30 pm		#22 TCU*		Horner Ballpark • Dallas, TX	**W** 11–6	**Reeves** (1–0)	Green (2–1)	–	1,542	23–9	–	Stats; Story
April 12	5:00 pm		at College of Charleston*		CofC Baseball Stadium • Charleston, SC	**L** 3–4	McLarty (6–2)	**Martinson** (5–1)	Ocker (8)	556	23–10	–	Stats; Story
April 13	1:00 pm		at College of Charleston*		CofC Baseball Stadium • Charleston, SC	**W** 6–2	**Johnson** (5–1)	Lucas (3–1)	**Carraway** (2)	603	24–10	–	Stats; Story
April 14	11:30 am		at College of Charleston*		CofC Baseball Stadium • Charleston, SC	**W** 14–4	**Bayless** (5–1)	Price (5–3)	–	518	25–10	–	Stats; Story
April 16	6:05 pm		at Oklahoma State*		Allie P. Reynolds Stadium • Stillwater, OK	**L** 3–6	Kelly (1–0)	**Kechely** (0–4)	Gragg (2)	1,511	25–11	–	Stats; Story
April 19	4:00 pm		Bradley		Horner Ballpark • Dallas, TX	**L** 1–2	Olson (1–0)	**Martinson** (5–2)	Denlinger (3)	476	25–12	4–3	Stats; Story
April 20	2:00 pm		Bradley		Horner Ballpark • Dallas, TX	**W** 14–3	**Johnson** (6–1)	Gosswein (4–3)	–	801	26–12	5–3	Stats; Story
April 20	5:50 pm		Bradley		Horner Ballpark • Dallas, TX	**W** 7–6	**Hines** (3–1)	Cook (4–1)	–	801	27–12	6–3	Stats; Story
April 23	3:00 pm		at TCU*		Lupton Stadium • Fort Worth, TX	**W** 9–3	**Stone** (1–0)	Eissler (3–4)	–	3,936	28–12	–	Stats; Story
April 26	6:30 pm		Illinois State		Horner Ballpark • Dallas, TX	**L** 8–9	Headrick (5–3)	**Martinson** (5–3)	Gilmore (10)	1,184	28–13	6–4	Stats; Story
April 27	2:00 pm		Illinois State		Horner Ballpark • Dallas, TX	**W** 13–3	**Johnson** (7–1)	Lindgren (4–3)	–	1,000	29–13	7–4	Stats; Story
April 28	12:00 pm		Illinois State		Horner Ballpark • Dallas, TX	**W** 11–4	**Bayless** (6–1)	Walker (3–6)	–	648	30–13	8–4	Stats; Story
April 30	8:15 pm		at UT Arlington*		Clay Gould Ballpark • Arlington, TX	**W** 7–1	**Fouse** (3–0)	Skeffington (0–1)	–	345	31–13	–	Stats; Story

May (7–3)

Date	Time (CT)	TV	Opponent	Rank	Stadium	Score	Win	Loss	Save	Attendance	Overall	MVC	
May 2	6:00 pm	ESPNU	at Missouri State		Hammons Field • Springfield, MO	**W** 6–1	**Martinson** (6–3)	Lochner (3–2)	–	273	32–13	9–4	Stats; Story
May 4	12:00 pm		at Missouri State		Hammons Field • Springfield, MO	**L** 3–4	Wiley (3–5)	**Johnson** (7–2)	Sechler (4)		32–14	9–5	Stats; Story
May 4	3:30 pm		at Missouri State		Hammons Field • Springfield, MO	**L** 0–6	Schwab (2–4)	**Sherlin** (0–1)	–	455	32–15	9–6	Stats; Story
May 7	6:30 pm		Stephen F. Austin*		Horner Ballpark • Dallas, TX	**W** 11–0	**Towns** (2–1)	Sgambelluri (2–5)	–	844	33–15	–	Stats; Story
May 10	6:30 pm		Indiana State		Horner Ballpark • Dallas, TX	**W** 12–2	**Martinson** (7–3)	Polley (6–1)	–	828	34–15	10–6	Stats; Story
May 11	8:30 pm	ESPNU	Indiana State		Horner Ballpark • Dallas, TX	**W** 8–1	**Johnson** (8–2)	Liberatore (9–1)	–	801	35–15	11–6	Stats; Story
May 12	2:00 pm		Indiana State		Horner Ballpark • Dallas, TX	**W** 7–3	**Carraway** (4–1)	Whitbread (6–2)	**Hines** (3)	686	36–15	12–6	Stats; Story
May 16	6:30 pm		at Southern Illinois	#27	Itchy Jones Stadium • Carbondale, IL	**L** 2–3	Yeager (3–2)	**Carraway** (4–2)	–	214	36–16	12–7	Stats; Story
May 17	6:30 pm		at Southern Illinois	#27	Itchy Jones Stadium • Carbondale, IL	**W** 11–6	**Johnson** (9–2)	Begner (5–7)	–	297	37–16	13–7	Stats; Story
May 18	2:00 pm		at Southern Illinois	#27	Itchy Jones Stadium • Carbondale, IL	**W** 12–1	**Fouse** (4–0)	Steidl (3–3)	–	255	38–16	14–7	Stats; Story

Postseason (5–4)
MVC Tournament (3–2)

Date	Time (CT)	TV	Opponent	Rank	Stadium	Score	Win	Loss	Save	Attendance	Overall	MVC	
May 22	11:00 am		(6) Missouri State	(1)	Duffy Bass Field • Normal, IL	**W** 1–0	**Martinson** (8–3)	Schwab (3–5)	**Carraway** (3)		39–16	–	Stats; Story
May 23	3:00 pm		(4) Evansville	(1)	Duffy Bass Field • Normal, IL	**W** 9–2	**Bayless** (7–1)	Hayden (3–3)	–		40–16	–	Stats; Story
May 24	5:00 pm		at (2) Illinois State	(1)	Duffy Bass Field • Normal, IL	**W** 9–7	**Fouse** (5–0)	Vogrin (2–1)	**Carraway** (4)		41–16	–	Stats; Story
May 25	2:00 pm		(3) Indiana State	(1)	Duffy Bass Field • Normal, IL	**L** 5–9	Moralis (1–0)	**Reeves** (1–1)	Grauer (8)		41–17	–	Stats; Story
May 25	6:15 pm		(3) Indiana State	(1)	Duffy Bass Field • Normal, IL	**L** 3–16^{8}	Ridgway (2–0)	**Towns** (2–2)	–	326	41–18	–	Stats; Story

NCAA tournament (2–2)

Date	Time (CT)	TV	Opponent	Rank	Stadium	Score	Win	Loss	Save	Attendance	Overall	MVC	
May 31	7:00 pm		(3) Florida	(2)	Dan Law Field • Lubbock, TX	**W** 11–8	**Johnson** (10–2)	Mace (8–5)	**Carraway** (5)	4,530	42–18	–	Stats; Story
June 1	4:36 pm		at (1) Texas Tech	(2)	Dan Law Field • Lubbock, TX	**L** 2–3	Floyd (5–3)	**Martinson** (8–4)	–	4,567	42–19	–	Stats; Story
June 2	2:00 pm		(3) Florida	(2)	Dan Law Field • Lubbock, TX	**W** 9–8	**Fouse** (6–0)	Pogue (1–1)	**Carraway** (6)		43–19	–	Stats; Story
June 2	6:26 pm		at (1) Texas Tech	(2)	Dan Law Field • Lubbock, TX	**L** 0–3	Bonnin (6–1)	**Reeves** (1–2)	McMillon (2)	4,679	43–20	–	Stats; Story

Legend: = Win = Loss Bold = Dallas Baptist team member
"#" represents ranking. All rankings from Collegiate Baseball on the date of the contest.
"()" represents postseason seeding in the Missouri Valley Tournament or NCAA Regional, respectively.

== Rankings ==
Ranking movements Legend: ██ Increase in ranking ██ Decrease in ranking — = Not ranked RV = Received votes т = Tied with team above or below
	Week																		
Poll	Pre	1	2	3	4	5	6	7	8	9	10	11	12	13	14	15	16	17	Final
Coaches'	RV	RV*	RV*	RV	RV	RV	RV	RV	RV	RV	RV	RV	RV	RV	25	25	25*	25*	RV
Baseball America	—	—	—	—	—	—	—	—	—	—	—	—	—	23	22	—	—*	—*	—
Collegiate Baseball^	—	—	—	—	—	—	—	—	—	—	—	—	—	27	28	—	—	—	—
NCBWA†	RV	RV	RV	RV	RV	RV	RV	RV	RV	RV	RV	RV	RV	27т	23	26	26*	26*	28т
D1Baseball	—	—	—	—	—	—	—	—	—	—	—	—	—	—	24	24	24*	24*	24

^ Collegiate Baseball ranked 40 teams in their preseason poll, but only ranked 30 teams weekly during the season.
† NCBWA ranks 30 teams in their preseason poll, but only ranks 25 teams weekly during the season.
* A new poll was not released for this week, so for comparison purposes, the previous week's ranking is inserted in this week's slot.
