= 2019 Indiana State Sycamores baseball team =

American college baseball season

2019 Indiana State Sycamores baseball

MVC Tournament champions

NCAA tournament, Nashville Regional
- Conference: Missouri Valley Conference
- Record: 43–18 (13–8 MVC)
- Head coach: Mitch Hannahs (6th season)
- Assistant coaches: Brian Smiley (10th season); Brad Vanderglas (3rd season); Pascal Paul (1st season)
- Home stadium: Sycamore Stadium

2019 Missouri Valley Conference baseball standings
	Conf.				Overall
Team	W		L	PCT	W		L	PCT
No. 24 Dallas Baptist ‍†‍‍^{y}	14	–	7	.667	43	–	20	.683
Illinois State ‍†‍‍^{y}	14	–	7	.667	36	–	26	.581
No. 23 Indiana State ‍‍‡‍^{y}	13	–	8	.619	43	–	18	.705
Bradley ‍‍‍	11	–	10	.524	31	–	19	.620
Evansville ‍‍‍	11	–	10	.524	24	–	29	.453
Missouri State ‍‍‍	10	–	11	.476	20	–	36	.357
Valparaiso ‍‍‍	6	–	15	.286	14	–	36	.280
Southern Illinois ‍‍‍	5	–	16	.238	26	–	29	.473
† – Conference champion ‡ – Tournament champion y – Invited to the NCAA tournament As of July 16, 2019; Rankings from D1Baseball

The 2019 Indiana State Sycamores baseball team represented Indiana State University during the 2019 NCAA Division I baseball season. The Sycamores played their home games at Sycamore Stadium as a member of the Missouri Valley Conference. They were led by head coach Mitch Hannahs, in his 6th season at Indiana State.

== Previous season ==
The 2018 Indiana State Sycamores baseball team notched a 29–22 (11–10) regular season record and finished tied for third in the MVC Conference standings. The Sycamores reached the 2018 Missouri Valley Conference baseball tournament, where they were defeated by Missouri State in the semifinals. Indiana State did not receive an at-large bid to the 2018 NCAA Division I baseball tournament.

== Personnel ==
=== Coaching staff ===
Name	Position	Seasons at Indiana State	Alma mater
Mitch Hannahs	Head coach	6	Indiana State University (1989)
Brian Smiley	Associate head coach	10	University of Arkansas at Little Rock (2007)
Brad Vanderglas	Assistant Coach	3	Northern Kentucky University (2013)
Pascal Paul	Volunteer Assistant Coach	1	West Virginia University (2014)

=== Roster ===
2019 Indiana State Sycamores Roster
Pitchers: 7 - Zach Frey - Junior; 9 - Tyler Ward - Senior; 10 - Evan Giles - RS Junior; 15 - Austin Moralis - Junior; 22 - Tristan Weaver - Junior; 26 - Tyler Whitbread - Senior; 27 - Ross Kramer - Junior; 28 - Triston Polley - Senior; 30 - Geremy Guerrero - Junior; 32 - Collin Liberatore - RS Junior; 35 - Jake Ridgway - Sophomore; 36 - Austin Cross - Junior; 37 - Tyler Grauer - Junior; 38 - Max Klein - Freshman; 40 - Will Buraconak - Junior	Catchers: 12 - Max Wright - Junior; 13 - Spencer Wiskus - Junior; Infielders: 1 - Jordan Schaffer - RS Sophomore; 2 - Jarrod Watkins - Senior; 5 - Jake Means - Senior; 6 - Clay Dungan - Senior; 8 - Dominic Cusumano - Freshman; 11 - Nolan Brimbury - RS Junior; 18 - Joe Boyle - RS Senior; 19 - Mitch Barrow - Junior; 20 - Hunter Lewis - Senior; 23 - Dane Tofteland - RS Senior; 25 - Romero Harris - RS Senior	Outfielders: 3 - Luke Fegen - Senior; 16 - Brandt Nowaskie - RS Junior; 17 - Roby Enriquez - Senior; 21 - CJ Huntley - Senior; 24 - Ellison Hanna II - Junior; 29 - Nick Barrett - RS Freshman; 34 - Chris Ayers - Senior

== Schedule and results ==
2019 Indiana State Sycamores baseball game log
Regular season (36–15)
February (7–1)

Date	Time (ET)	TV	Opponent	Rank	Stadium	Score	Win	Loss	Save	Attendance	Overall	MVC	
February 15	6:00 pm		at Jacksonville*		John Sessions Stadium • Jacksonville, FL	**W** 7–1	**Guerrero** (1–0)	Santana (0–1)	–	342	1–0	–	Stats; Story
February 16	2:00 pm		at Jacksonville*		John Sessions Stadium • Jacksonville, FL	**W** 13–7	**Liberatore** (1–0)	Palmer (0–1)	–	274	2–0	–	Stats; Story
February 17	1:00 pm		at Jacksonville*		John Sessions Stadium • Jacksonville, FL	**W** 8–3	**Buraconak** (1–0)	Jones (0–1)	**Ridgway** (1)	217	3–0	–	Stats; Story
February 22	4:00 pm		at UNC Wilmington*		Brooks Field • Wilmington, NC	**W** 1–0	**Polley** (1–0)	Gesell (0–2)	**Grauer** (1)	803	4–0	–	Stats; Story
February 23	10:00 am		Marshall*		Brooks Field • Wilmington, NC	**W** 4–1	**Liberatore** (2–0)	Knight (0–1)	**Ward** (1)		5–0	–	Stats; Story
February 24	10:00 am		Iona*		Brooks Field • Wilmington, NC	**W** 10–0	**Whitbread** (1–0)	Untracht (0–1)	–		6–0	–	Stats; Story
February 26	4:00 pm	ESPN+	at Western Carolina*		Hennon Stadium • Cullowhee, NC	**W** 8–4	**Cross** (1–0)	McColloch (1–1)	**Ridgway** (2)	494	7–0	–	Stats; Story
February 27	4:00 pm	ESPN+	at Western Carolina*		Hennon Stadium • Cullowhee, NC	**L** 9–10	Therrian (1–0)	**Giles** (0–1)	Corn (1)	387	7–1	–	Stats; Story

March (14–3)

Date	Time (ET)	TV	Opponent	Rank	Stadium	Score	Win	Loss	Save	Attendance	Overall	MVC	
March 1	2:00 pm		Austin Peay*		Sycamore Stadium • Terre Haute, IN	**W** 8–1	**Polley** (2–0)	Vial (0–1)	–	428	8–1	–	Stats; Story
March 2	1:00 pm		Austin Peay*		Sycamore Stadium • Terre Haute, IN	**W** 3–2^{10}	**Ward** (1–0)	Martinez (0–1)	–	387	9–1	–	Stats; Story
March 8	6:00 pm		at Mercer*		Claude Smith Field • Macon, GA	**W** 12–7	**Polley** (3–0)	Gipson (2–2)	**Ridgway** (3)	369	10–1	–	Stats; Story
March 9	2:00 pm		at Mercer*		Claude Smith Field • Macon, GA	**W** 7–3	**Liberatore** (3–0)	Hall (2–2)	**Ward** (2)	677	11–1	–	Stats; Story
March 10	12:00 pm		at Mercer*		Claude Smith Field • Macon, GA	**W** 9–4	**Whitbread** (2–0)	Graveno (1–2)	**Ridgway** (4)	352	12–1	–	Stats; Story
March 13	4:00 pm	ESPN+	Purdue*		Sycamore Stadium • Terre Haute, IN	**W** 4–3	**Cross** (2–0)	Peterson (1–3)	**Grauer** (2)	653	13–1	–	Stats; Story
March 16	1:00 pm		The Citadel*		Sycamore Stadium • Terre Haute, IN	**W** 5–1	**Polley** (4–0)	Connolly (2–2)	–		14–1	–	Stats; Story
March 16	4:30 pm		The Citadel*		Sycamore Stadium • Terre Haute, IN	**W** 4–2	**Liberatore** (4–0)	Merritt (2–3)	–	789	15–1	–	Stats; Story
March 17	1:00 pm	ESPN+	The Citadel*		Sycamore Stadium • Terre Haute, IN	**W** 8–0	**Whitbread** (3–0)	Spence (2–2)	–	345	16–1	–	Stats; Story
March 19	4:00 pm	ESPN+	Indiana*		Sycamore Stadium • Terre Haute, IN	**L** 14–15	Scott (1–0)	**Grauer** (0–1)	Lloyd (3)	1,108	16–2	–	Stats; Story
March 22	7:00 pm		Rutgers*		City of Palms Park • Fort Myers, FL	**W** 3–1	**Grauer** (1–1)	Brito (3–2)	–	263	17–2	–	Stats; Story
March 23	6:00 pm		Rutgers*		City of Palms Park • Fort Myers, FL	**W** 7–5	**Giles** (1–1)	Gerace (0–3)	**Ward** (3)	242	18–2	–	Stats; Story
March 24	1:00 pm		Rutgers*		City of Palms Park • Fort Myers, FL	**W** 4–3	**Whitbread** (4–0)	Parkinson (0–1)	**Grauer** (3)	178	19–2	–	Stats; Story
March 26	6:00 pm	ESPN+	#23 Illinois*		Sycamore Stadium • Terre Haute, IN	**W** 3–1	**Ridgway** (1–0)	Harris (1–1)	**Ward** (4)	685	20–2	–	Stats; Story
March 29	4:00 pm	ESPN3	at Missouri State		Hammons Field • Springfield, MO	**L** 5–6^{11}	Sechler (2–2)	**Grauer** (1–2)	–	165	20–3	0–1	Stats; Story
March 31	1:00 pm	ESPN3	at Missouri State		Hammons Field • Springfield, MO	**L** 5–6^{11}	Juenger (1–2)	**Guerrero** (1–1)	–		20–4	0–2	Stats; Story
March 31	4:00 pm	ESPN3	at Missouri State		Hammons Field • Springfield, MO	**W** 12–0^{7}	**Whitbread** (5–0)	Cruikshank (0–1)	–	1,003	21–4	1–2	Stats; Story

April (11–5)

Date	Time (ET)	TV	Opponent	Rank	Stadium	Score	Win	Loss	Save	Attendance	Overall	MVC	
April 3	6:00 pm	BTN+	at Purdue*		Alexander Field • West Lafayette, IN	**W** 4–3	**Ward** (2–0)	Johnson (0–2)	**Grauer** (4)	1,430	22–4	–	Stats; Story
April 5	6:35 pm	BTN+	at Michigan State*		John H. Kobs Field • East Lansing, MI	**L** 0–1^{10}	Diaz (1–3)	**Ward** (2–1)	–	1,654	22–5	–	Stats; Story
April 6	4:00 pm	BTN+	at Michigan State*		John H. Kobs Field • East Lansing, MI	**W** 2–1	**Liberatore** (5–0)	Tyranski (0–6)	**Grauer** (5)	1,536	23–5	–	Stats; Story
April 7	1:00 pm	BTN+	at Michigan State*		John H. Kobs Field • East Lansing, MI	**L** 0–6	Sleeman (2–1)	**Whitbread** (4–1)	–	1,438	23–6	–	Stats; Story
April 9	5:00 pm		at #27 Michigan*		Ray Fisher Stadium • Ann Arbor, MI	**W** 8–7^{10}	**Ward** (3–1)	Weiss (2–2)	**Grauer** (6)	442	24–6	–	Stats; Story
April 10	5:00 pm	BTN+	at #27 Michigan*		Ray Fisher Stadium • Ann Arbor, MI	**L** 4–6^{6}	Weisenburger (1–0)	**Klein** (0–1)	–	369	24–7	–	Stats; Story
April 12	6:30 pm	ESPN+	Valparaiso		Sycamore Stadium • Terre Haute, IN	**W** 13–2^{7}	**Polley** (5–0)	Tieman (2–6)	–	560	25–7	2–2	Stats; Story
April 13	1:00 pm		Valparaiso		Sycamore Stadium • Terre Haute, IN	**W** 8–0	**Liberatore** (6–0)	Fields (2–4)	–		26–7	3–2	Stats; Story
April 13	4:00 pm		Valparaiso		Sycamore Stadium • Terre Haute, IN	**W** 11–5	**Ward** (4–1)	Rhodehouse (1–1)	–	898	27–7	4–2	Stats; Story
April 16	7:30 pm	SECN+	at #6 Vanderbilt*		Hawkins Field • Nashville, TN	**L** 1–7	Hickman (5–0)	**Guerrero** (1–2)	–	2,810	27–8	–	Stats; Story
April 20	6:00 pm	ESPN+	at Evansville		Charles H. Braun Stadium • Evansville, IN	**L** 2–6	Lukas (5–3)	**Cross** (2–1)	Parks (5)	227	27–9	4–3	Stats; Story
April 21	1:00 pm	ESPN+	at Evansville		Charles H. Braun Stadium • Evansville, IN	**W** 8–2	**Liberatore** (7–0)	Croner (5–4)	–		28–9	5–3	Stats; Story
April 21	4:00 pm	ESPN+	at Evansville		Charles H. Braun Stadium • Evansville, IN	**W** 6–4	**Grauer** (2–2)	Parks (1–2)	–	228	29–9	6–3	Stats; Story
April 26	6:30 pm	ESPN3	Southern Illinois		Sycamore Stadium • Terre Haute, IN	**W** 6–3	**Polley** (6–0)	Hiser (3–3)	–	678	30–9	7–3	Stats; Story
April 27	12:00 pm	ESPN3	Southern Illinois		Sycamore Stadium • Terre Haute, IN	**W** 7–2	**Liberatore** (8–0)	Givens (3–6)	–	632	31–9	8–3	Stats; Story
April 28	1:00 pm	ESPN3	Southern Illinois		Sycamore Stadium • Terre Haute, IN	**W** 7–4	**Ward** (5–1)	Yeager (2–2)	**Grauer** (7)	567	32–9	9–3	Stats; Story

May (4–6)

Date	Time (ET)	TV	Opponent	Rank	Stadium	Score	Win	Loss	Save	Attendance	Overall	MVC	
May 1	7:00 pm	BTN+	at Illinois*		Illinois Field • Champaign, IL	**L** 2–5	Sefcik (2–1)	**Klein** (0–2)	Acton (15)	613	32–10	–	Stats; Story
May 3	6:00 pm	ESPN+	at Illinois State		Duffy Bass Field • Normal, IL	**L** 3–4	Headrick (6–3)	**Grauer** (2–3)	–	316	32–11	9–4	Stats; Story
May 4	3:00 pm	ESPN+	at Illinois State		Duffy Bass Field • Normal, IL	**W** 13–1	**Liberatore** (9–0)	Lindgren (4–4)	–	554	33–11	10–4	Stats; Story
May 5	2:00 pm	ESPN+	at Illinois State		Duffy Bass Field • Normal, IL	**W** 6–1	**Whitbread** (6–1)	Walker (3–7)	**Ward** (5)	368	34–11	11–4	Stats; Story
May 10	7:30 pm		at Dallas Baptist		Horner Ballpark • Dallas, TX	**L** 2–12^{8}	Martinson (7–3)	**Polley** (6–1)	–	828	34–12	11–5	Stats; Story
May 11	9:30 pm	ESPNU	at Dallas Baptist		Horner Ballpark • Dallas, TX	**L** 1–8	Johnson (8–2)	**Liberatore** (9–1)	–	801	34–13	11–6	Stats; Story
May 12	3:00 pm		at Dallas Baptist		Horner Ballpark • Dallas, TX	**L** 3–7	Carraway (4–1)	**Whitbread** (6–2)	Hines (3)	686	34–14	11–7	Stats; Story
May 16	6:30 pm	ESPN+	Bradley		Sycamore Stadium • Terre Haute, IN	**L** 5–9	Cook (5–1)	**Ward** (5–2)	–	456	34–15	11–8	Stats; Story
May 17	6:30 pm	ESPN+	Bradley		Sycamore Stadium • Terre Haute, IN	**W** 12–8	**Liberatore** (10–1)	Olson (1–2)	–	428	35–15	12–8	Stats; Story
May 18	2:00 pm	ESPN+	Bradley		Sycamore Stadium • Terre Haute, IN	**W** 10–2	**Whitbread** (7–2)	Lund (5–4)	–	540	36–15	13–8	Stats; Story

Postseason (7–3)
MVC tournament (5–1)

Date	Time (ET)	TV	Opponent	Rank	Stadium	Score	Win	Loss	Save	Attendance	Overall	MVC	
May 22	7:30 pm	ESPN+	(4) Evansville	(3)	Duffy Bass Field • Normal, IL	**W** 7–0	**Polley** (7–1)	Lukas (5–6)	–		37–15	–	Stats; Story
May 23	8:00 pm	ESPN+	at (2) Illinois State	(3)	Duffy Bass Field • Normal, IL	**L** 7–10	Anderson (3–0)	**Ward** (5–3)	Gilmore (11)	694	37–16	–	Stats; Story
May 24	12:00 pm	ESPN+	(8) Southern Illinois	(3)	Duffy Bass Field • Normal, IL	**W** 4–1	**Whitbread** (8–2)	Steidl (3–4)	**Guerrero** (1)		38–16	–	Stats; Story
May 24	10:00 pm	ESPN+	at (2) Illinois State	(3)	Duffy Bass Field • Normal, IL	**W** 10–6	**Ward** (6–3)	Wicklund (4–4)	–		39–16	–	Stats; Story
May 25	3:00 pm	ESPN+	(1) Dallas Baptist	(3)	Duffy Bass Field • Normal, IL	**W** 9–5	**Moralis** (1–0)	Reeves (1–1)	**Grauer** (8)		40–16	–	Stats; Story
May 25	7:15 pm	ESPN+	(1) Dallas Baptist	(3)	Duffy Bass Field • Normal, IL	**W** 16–3^{8}	**Ridgway** (2–0)	Towns (2–2)	–	326	41–16	–	Stats; Story

NCAA tournament (2–2)

Date	Time (ET)	TV	Opponent	Rank	Stadium	Score	Win	Loss	Save	Attendance	Overall	MVC	
May 31	1:00 pm	ESPN3	(3) McNeese State	(2)	Hawkins Field • Nashville, TN	**W** 6–5	**Polley** (8–1)	McLemore (1–1)	**Grauer** (9)	3,248	42–16	–	Stats; Story
June 1	7:00 pm	ESPN3	at (1) Vanderbilt	(2)	Hawkins Field • Nashville, TN	**L** 5–8	Rocker (9–5)	**Liberatore** (10–2)	Eder (3)	3,626	42–17	–	Stats; Story
June 2	3:00 pm	ESPN3	(4) Ohio State	(2)	Hawkins Field • Nashville, TN	**W** 10–5	**Whitbread** (9–2)	Smith (7–5)	**Ridgway** (5)	3,289	43–17	–	Stats; Story
June 2	9:00 pm	ESPN3	at (1) Vanderbilt	(2)	Hawkins Field • Nashville, TN	**L** 1–12	Hickman (8–0)	**Guerrero** (1–3)	–	3,626	43–18	–	Stats; Story

Legend: = Win = Loss Bold = Indiana State team member
"#" represents ranking. All rankings from Collegiate Baseball on the date of the contest.
"()" represents postseason seeding in the MVC Tournament or NCAA Regional, respectively.

== Rankings ==
Ranking movements Legend: ██ Increase in ranking ██ Decrease in ranking — = Not ranked RV = Received votes
	Week																		
Poll	Pre	1	2	3	4	5	6	7	8	9	10	11	12	13	14	15	16	17	Final
Coaches'	—	—*		RV	RV	RV	RV	RV	RV	RV	RV	RV	RV	RV	—	RV	RV*	RV*	RV
Baseball America	—	—	—	—	—	—	—	—	—	—	—	—	—	—	—	25	25*	25*	—
Collegiate Baseball^	RV	—	—	—	—	—	—	—	—	—	—	—	—	—	—	30	—	—	—
NCBWA†	—	—	RV	RV	RV	RV	RV	RV	RV	RV	RV	RV	RV	RV	RV	28	28*	28*	30
D1Baseball	—	—	—	—	—	—	—	—	—	—	—	—	—	—	—	23	23*	23*	23

^ Collegiate Baseball ranked 40 teams in their preseason poll, but only ranked 30 teams weekly during the season.
† NCBWA ranks 30 teams in their preseason poll, but only ranks 25 teams weekly during the season.
* A new poll was not released for this week, so for comparison purposes, the previous week's ranking is inserted in this week's slot.
