= Gamma Alpha =

American graduate student organization

- ΓΑ
- Founded: March 1899; 127 years ago Cornell University
- Type: Professional
- Affiliation: Independent
- Status: Active
- Emphasis: Interdisciplinary, graduate students
- Scope: National
- Motto: Γνωθι την 'Αληθειαν "Know the truth."
- Colors: Gold and Black
- Publication: Gamma Alpha Newsletter
- Chapters: 4 (active)
- Headquarters: 116 Oak Avenue; Ithaca, New York 14850; United States
- Website: www.gammaalphaithaca.com

The Gamma Alpha Graduate Scientific Society (ΓΑ) is an American fraternal organization for interdisciplinary graduate students. Its chapters are headquartered in chapter houses, akin to residential cooperatives, though there have been many chapters that lacked a chapter house historically.

== History ==
The Society was founded in 1899 as the Gamma Alpha Graduate Scientific Fraternity in Ithaca, New York by graduate students in the biological sciences at Cornell University. Its purpose was an interdisciplinary one concerning the sciences: to stimulate "mutual interest" among graduate students from "the various scientific departments of Cornell University." In time, it expanded to more than a dozen chapters across the country and boasted a membership of "more than 10,000 men."

In 1909, the fraternity merged with Alpha Delta Epsilon, a similar group established at Johns Hopkins University in 1905. A chapter was established at Dartmouth College in 1906. This was followed by chapters at the University of Chicago and the University of Illinois in 1908. Gamma Alpha held its first national convention in 1908.

In 1963, it changed its name to the Gamma Alpha Graduate Scientific Society, in part to differentiate itself from undergraduate fraternities. Originally, the society was a scientific fraternity exclusively for men. Individual chapters, such as the Missouri chapter, admitted women by 1968. Chicago, Cornell and Ohio chapters began to admit women and students in disciplines other than the sciences in 1972 Ann Arbor chapter followed in 1973. Although the makeup of the organization has thus changed greatly since its inception, it is still dedicated to promoting an interdisciplinary fellowship among graduate students, in large part through its cooperative living arrangements.

== Symbols ==
The significance of Gamma Alpha's motto as well as the symbolism of its insignia used to be revealed to new members in their initiation ceremony. After presenting the candidates with their certificates of membership, the president of the chapter would inform them that:

The letters ΓΑ denote our motto:Gnothe ten Aletheian – Know the Truth. The wings and star on our Society Emblem, which all of you are now entitled to wear, signify Progress and Attainment. The four notches in that Emblem commemorate the four original Chapters: Cornell, Johns Hopkins, Chicago, and Dartmouth.

Today, the society has no such initiation ceremony, though the motto and insignia have been retained. Most ceremonies of this sort—another would be the singing of the fraternity's song at the end of chapter meetings—appear to have been dropped with the organization's metamorphosis from a fraternity into a type of fraternal, co-ed cooperative.

Gamma Alpha's colors are gold and black. Its publication print publication was The Gamma Alpha Record, established in 1908.

== Activities ==
Where established, chapter houses have served as venues for the academic talks hosted by the society. More informally, the shared living space of the society's houses provide its members with a forum for a regular exchange of ideas across disciplines.

== Chapters ==
None of the active chapters are legally affiliated with its members' home academic institution. For convenience, each chapter is designated by the name of its logical academic institution.

Following is a list of Gamma Alpha chapters. Active chapters are indicated in bold. Inactive chapters are in italics.

Chapter	Charter date	Institution	Location	Gender	Status	Ref.
**Cornell**	March 1899	Cornell University	Ithaca, New York	Co-ed	Active	
Hopkins	1905	Johns Hopkins University	Baltimore, Maryland		Inactive	(Note: Formed as Alpha Delta Epsilon, established as a local group in 1905, and merged with Gamma Alpha in 1909.)
Dartmouth	1906–1937	Dartmouth College	Hanover, New Hampshire	Male	Inactive	
**Chicago**	February 8, 1908	University of Chicago	Chicago, Illinois	Co-ed	Active	
**Illinois**	December 16, 1908	University of Illinois Urbana-Champaign	Urbana, Illinois	Co-ed	Active	
Wisconsin	1910	University of Wisconsin–Madison	Madison, Wisconsin	Male	Inactive	
**Michigan**	April 18, 1913	University of Michigan	Ann Arbor, Michigan	Co-ed	Active	
Missouri	1914	University of MIssouri	Columbia, Missouri	Co-ed	Inactive	
Yale	1915–before 1962	Yale University	New Haven, Connecticut	Male	Inactive	
Minnesota	1916	University of Minnesota	Minneapolis, Minnesota		Inactive	
Iowa	1920	University of Iowa	Iowa City, Iowa		Inactive	
Ohio	April 21, 1922	Ohio State University	Columbus, Ohio	Co-ed	Inactive	
California	1923–before 1962	University of California, Berkeley	Berkeley, California	Male	Inactive	
Harvard	1923–before 1962	Harvard University	Cambridge, Massachusetts	Male	Inactive	
Stanford	1939–1954	Stanford University	Stanford, California	Male	Inactive	
Davis	1955	University of California, Davis	Davis, California		Inactive	

=== Cornell chapter ===
The Cornell chapter was the founding branch of the organization and contributed several illustrious members like Hans Bethe, the German-American physicist who won the Nobel Prize in Physics in 1967 for his work on the theory of stellar nucleosynthesis. The chapter continues to offer housing to graduate students in the sciences at its house at 116 Oak Avenue.

=== Chicago chapter ===
The Chicago chapter was the second chapter of the society to be established (excluding the Alpha Delta Epsilon Scientific Fraternity chapters which, though they existed before the Chicago chapter, merged with the society shortly after the latter's establishment). According to early records, it was through the "untiring zeal" of F. H. Krecker and R. E. Sheldon of the Cornell chapter that graduate students in the sciences at the University of Chicago petitioned Gamma Alpha for a charter in December 1907. The charter was granted on February 8, 1908, and the chapter was officially installed on the same day.

The chapter has been housed in six different locations in its nearly one hundred years of existence in Hyde Park, Chicago. In its first year, the chapter secured rooms that were "modestly though neatly furnished" on the first floor of 5724 S. Drexel Avenue. Within a year, it had already found a house of its own at 5731 S. Monroe Avenue (renamed Kenwood Avenue in 1915), where "almost all" of its 24 members lodged. By October 1915, the chapter had moved again, this time to a house that would affectionately come to be called the Blackstone Castle, at 5520 S. Blackstone Avenue, where "eighteen to twenty-odd men" were put up in seven bedrooms. By October 1922, the chapter had moved to 5733 Kenwood Avenue, in the house next to its former residence. In the first quarter of 1938, the chapter relocated to 5735 S. Woodlawn Avenue, "the most beat up house on Woodlawn" with a "poor porch" that remained, "well, darn poor." Finally, in a forced move in the latter half of 1958, the chapter settled into its longest-lived home to date, the former residence of the famous American sociologist, David Riesman, at 5621 S. University Avenue, across the street from the campus (see below).

The chapter fell on tough times and nearly lost its housing both during World War II and with the sale of its house to the University of Chicago in 1958. Like many residential institutions during World War II, the Chicago chapter lost many men to the armed forces and was hard-pressed to fill the house with enough members to make ends meet. Supplies like roofing tiles were "unattainable at any price" that the chapter could afford and the pipes also fell into disrepair, dripping "dismally" through the winter of 1943. The house's future seemed "none too bright" to its members and was so uncertain that "all efforts" were "being made to forestall a possible closure."

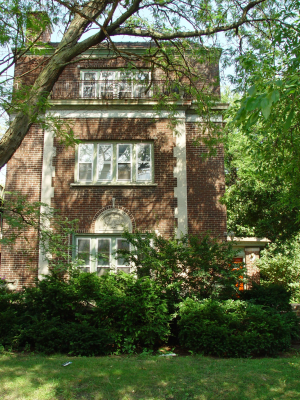
Gamma Alpha Chicago, 2006

Such a closure was all but certain in 1957 when an expanding University of Chicago arranged to buy the chapter house and replace it with a seminary dorm. For its part, the local corporation governing the house planned to use the monies from the sale to "establish a fellowship-loan fund," but at the cost of permanently closing the chapter house and displacing its resident members. A hard battle was subsequently fought by the chapter's active members, with the support of the national organization, to get the local corporation to relocate rather than abolish the chapter house. Eventually, the corporation capitulated and, with help from the university, relocated the chapter in 1958 to 5621 S. University Avenue, the "magnificent residence which is the present home of ΓΑ."

The Chicago chapter has institutionalized in its "House Rules" the membership changes that were ushered in the late 1960s and early 1970s. In recruiting new members for its 15 rooms, it seeks to maintain a balance between the sexes and admit students from as diverse a set of academic fields as possible. It has thus come to conceive of itself more as a graduate student cooperative than a scientific fraternity, though it remains both active in the national organization and invested in the welfare of its sister chapters. For more information about the present activities of the chapter, its recruitment of new members, and alumni contacts, visit the chapter's homepage.

=== Michigan chapter ===
The Gamma Alpha chapter of Ann Arbor first bought a house near the North Engels building. In 1949, Gamma Alpha moved to the current location in the southwest area of the city, into a house that was built in 1923 as a family residence. During the early years, the chapter housed up to 40 male chemistry graduate students. This luckily changed over time—the house now offers single rooms for thirteen graduate students, both female and male, and from all departments. The house has a lively and multicultural community, and besides some tightly organized house meetings, the members cook together, fill out crosswords, play board games, sled (in winter), brew beer, bake bread, repair the house, and engage in many other activities.

=== Illinois chapter ===
Instituted on December 16, 1908, a residential chapter has continuously been located at the University of Illinois and has been situated at 807 W Nevada Street in Urbana, Illinois for approximately the last eighty years. The Illinois chapter is a co-ed organization. It encourages application from graduate students attending the University of Illinois and has opened membership capabilities to students in areas other than exclusively scientific disciplines.

== Notable members ==
- Arnold Orville Beckman (Illinois,1922), the inventor of the first pH meter and founder of the first silicon transistor company in California (thus giving birth to Silicon Valley)
- Edward W. Berry (Johns Hopkins), paleontologist and botanist
- Hans Bethe (Cornell, 1934), physicist and Nobel prize laureate
- Polykarp Kusch (Illinois, 1932), won the Nobel prize in physics in 1955
- Frank Vigor Morley (Johns Hopkins), mathematician
- James George Needham (Cornell), entomologist
- John P. Stewart (Cornell), head of the pomology department at Penn State and head football coach at Illinois State University
- John Wesley Young (Dartmouth), mathematician
