= Illinois State Redbirds football =

Intercollegiate American football team

2026 Illinois State Redbirds football team
- First season: 1887; 139 years ago
- Athletic director: Dr. Jeri Beggs
- Head coach: Brock Spack; 18th season, 123–79 (.609)
- Location: Normal, Illinois
- Stadium: Hancock Stadium (capacity: 13,391)
- NCAA division: Division I FCS
- Conference: Missouri Valley Football
- Colors: Red and white
- All-time record: 541–563–63 (.491)
- Playoff record: 15–10 (.600)
- Bowl record: 0–1–0 (.000)

NCAA Division I FCS championships
- 0

Conference championships
- IIAC: 1937, 1940, 1941, 1945 IIAC 1950, 1967, 1968 MVFC: 1999, 2014, 2015
- Rivalries: Eastern Illinois (Mid-America Classic)
- Fight song: "Go, You Redbirds"
- Mascot: Reggie Redbird
- Marching band: Big Red Marching Machine
- Website: GoRedbirds.com

The Illinois State Redbirds football program is the intercollegiate American football team for Illinois State University in Normal, Illinois. The team competes in the NCAA Division I Football Championship Subdivision (FCS) as a member of the Missouri Valley Football Conference (MVFC). The school's first football team was fielded in 1887. The team plays its home games at the 13,391 seat Hancock Stadium. They are coached by Brock Spack.

== History ==
Prior to 1923, the Illinois State football team was known as the Teachers or the Fighting Teachers. When Clifford E. Horton began coaching the team in 1923, he proposed the Cardinals as the team's new nickname, after its red and white colors. Fred Young, the sports editor for The Pantagraph in Bloomington, Illinois, changed the name to the Redbirds to distinguish the team from the nearby St. Louis Cardinals.

=== Classifications ===
- 1906–1956: None
- 1956–1972: NCAA College Division (Small College)
- 1973–1975: NCAA Division II
- 1976–1977: NCAA Division I
- 1978–1981: NCAA Division I–A
- 1982–2006: NCAA Division I–AA
- 2006–present: NCAA Division I FCS

=== Conference memberships ===
- 1887–1907: Independent
- 1908–1949: Illinois Intercollegiate Athletic Conference
- 1950–1969: Interstate Intercollegiate Athletic Conference
- 1970–1972: Independent
- 1973–1975: Division II Independent
- 1976–1977: Division I Independent
- 1978–1980: Division I–A Independent
- 1981–1985: Missouri Valley Conference
- 1986–present: Gateway Football Conference/Missouri Valley Football Conference

== Conference championships ==
Illinois State has won ten conference titles, four outright.

Year	Conference	Coach	Overall record	Conference record
1937 †	Illinois Intercollegiate Athletic Conference	Howard Hancock	5–1–2	3–1–1
1940	Illinois Intercollegiate Athletic Conference	Howard Hancock	5–3–1	3–0–1
1941 †	Illinois Intercollegiate Athletic Conference	Howard Hancock	3–4–1	3–0–1
1945	Illinois Intercollegiate Athletic Conference	Edwin Struck	4–3	3–0
1950	Interstate Intercollegiate Athletic Conference	Edwin Struck	7–1–2	5–0–1
1967 †	Interstate Intercollegiate Athletic Conference	Larry Bitcon	8–2	2–1
1968 †	Interstate Intercollegiate Athletic Conference	Larry Bitcon	6–4	2–1
1999	Missouri Valley Football Conference	Todd Berry	11–3	6–0
2014 †	Missouri Valley Football Conference	Brock Spack	13–2	7–1
2015 †	Missouri Valley Football Conference	Brock Spack	10–3	7–1

† Co-championship

== Postseason appearances ==
=== NCAA Division I-AA/FCS playoffs ===
The Redbirds have made ten appearances in the Division I–AA/FCS playoffs, with a combined record of 15–10. Their best finishes were in 2014 and 2025 where they finished as National Runner-Up.

Year	Round	Opponent	Result
1998	First Round	at Northwestern State	L 28–48
1999	First Round; Quarterfinal; Semifinal	Colgate at Hofstra at Georgia Southern	W 56–13; W 37–20; L 17–31
2006	First Round; Quarterfinal	at Eastern Illinois at Youngstown State	W 24–13; L 21–28
2012	Second Round; Quarterfinal	at Appalachian State at Eastern Washington	W 38–37 ^{OT} L 35–51
2014	Second Round; Quarterfinal; Semifinal; Final	Northern Iowa at Eastern Washington at New Hampshire vs North Dakota State	W 41–21; W 59–46; W 21–18; L 27–29
2015	Second Round; Quarterfinal	Western Illinois; Richmond	W 36–19; L 27–39
2016	First Round	at Central Arkansas	L 24–31
2019	First Round; Second Round; Quarterfinal	at Southeast Missouri State at Central Arkansas at North Dakota State	W 24–6; W 24–14; L 3–9
2024	First Round; Second Round	at Southeast Missouri State at UC Davis	W 35–27; L 10–42
2025	First Round; Second Round; Quarterfinal; Semifinal; Final	at Southeastern Louisiana at North Dakota State at UC Davis at Villanova vs Montana State	W 21–3; W 29–28; W 42–31; W 30–14; L 34–35 ^{OT}

== Bowl games ==
Illinois State has one bowl appearance, going 0–1.

Year	Coach	Bowl	Opponent	Result
1950	Edwin Struck	Corn Bowl	Missouri School of Mines and Metallurgy	L 6–7

Missouri School of Mines and Metallurgy now known as Missouri S&T.

== Wins over FBS teams ==
Season	Opponent	Result
1987	Western Michigan	20–6
1991	at Akron	25–3
2012	at Eastern Michigan	31–14
2016	at Northwestern	9–7
2018	at Colorado State	35–19
2026	at Northern Illinois	28–24

== Head coaches ==
Years	Name	Record
1895	George Dygart	5–3–0 (.625)
1896	L. H. Galbreath	2–0–0 (1.000)
1897	B. C. Edwards	1–5–0 (.167)
1903–1906	John P. Stewart	14–10–1 (.580)
1907	John A. Keith	8–0–2 (.900)
1908–1909	George Binnewies	7–6–2 (.533)
1912–1922	Harrison Russell	15–43–10 (.294)
1923–1924	Clifford E. "Pop" Horton	4–8–4 (.375)
1925–1926	Don Karnes	6–9–0 (.400)
1927–1930	Joe Cogdal	7–23–2 (.250)
1931–1944	Howard Hancock	57–46–19 (.545)
1945–1964	Edwin Struck	86–78–14 (.522)
1965–1971	Larry Bitcon	32–35–2 (.478)
1972–1976	Gerry Hart	26–27–1 (.491)
1977–1980	Charlie Cowdrey	12–31–1 (.284)
1981–1987	Bob Otolski	30–41–3 (.426)
1988–1995	Jim Heacock	37–49–2 (.432)
1996–1999	Todd Berry	24–24 (.500)
2000–2008	Denver Johnson	45–46 (.495)
2009–present	Brock Spack	123–79 (.609)
Overall		541–563–63 (.491)

== Rivalries ==
=== Eastern Illinois ===
The Mid-America Classic is the rivalry game between Illinois State and Eastern Illinois. The rivalry began in 1901 and is the oldest in the state of Illinois. With the 100th game in the series, representatives from both schools met and developed the Mid-America Classic renaming for the rivalry. The two schools also collaborated on a traveling trophy, which holds plaques with the results of the previous 100 games in the series and has room for results of future games in the series. The two teams have played 113 times in total, with Illinois State holding a 61–43–9 advantage in the all-time series as of the 2025 season.

== National award winners ==
Buck Buchanan Award

- Zeke Vandenburgh, 2023

The Buck Buchanan Award is given annually to the College Football Best Defensive Player in the FCS by Stats Perform, from 1995 to present.

Mosi Tatupu Award

- Ryan Hoffman, 2005

The Mosi Tatupu Award was given annually to the College Football Special Teams Player of the Year by the Maui Quarterback Club and the Hula Bowl, from 1997 to 2006.

== Notable former players ==
=== Current NFL players ===
Name	Debut	Position	Team
Shelby Harris	2014	DT	New York Giants
Keondre Jackson	2025	S	Baltimore Ravens
Cam Grandy	2024	TE	Cincinnati Bengals

Notable alumni include:

- B. J. Bello
- Duane Butler
- Aveion Cason
- Luke Drone
- Chris Faletto
- Jim Fitzpatrick
- Larry Fitzpatrick
- Kevin Glenn
- Matthew Goldsmith (CFL)
- Boomer Grigsby
- Davontae Harris
- Shelby Harris
- Brent Hawkins
- Estus Hood
- Jason Johnson
- Andy King
- John Kropke
- Michael Liedtke
- Cameron Meredith
- Jim Meyer
- Tom Nelson
- James O'Shaughnessy
- Nate Palmer
- Mike Prior
- Tre Roberson
- James Robinson
- Laurent Robinson
- Colton Underwood
- Joe Vodicka
- Cody White
- Mike Zimmer
- Cam Grandy
- Daniel Sobkowicz
- Jalan Gaines

== Redbirds drafted into the NFL ==
Draft Year	Player	Position	Round	Overall	NFL Team
2018	Davontae Harris	CB	5	151	Cincinnati Bengals
2015	James O'Shaughnessy	TE	5	173	Kansas City Chiefs
2014	Shelby Harris	DE	7	235	Oakland Raiders
2013	Nate Palmer	LB	6	193	Green Bay Packers
2007	Laurent Robinson	WR	3	75	Atlanta Falcons
2006	Brent Hawkins	DE	5	160	Jacksonville Jaguars
2005	Boomer Grigsby	LB	5	138	Kansas City Chiefs
1990	Bill Miller	WR	10	258	Detroit Lions
1986	Jim Meyer	T	7	167	Cleveland Browns
1985	Mike Prior	DB	7	176	Tampa Bay Buccaneers
1984	Clarence Collins	WR	3	62	San Diego Chargers
1978	Estus Hood	DB	3	62	Green Bay Packers
1976	Calvin Harper	T	6	172	Kansas City Chiefs
1973	Ron Bell	RB	6	140	Pittsburgh Steelers
1970	Guy Homoly	DB	15	385	Cleveland Browns
1969	Dennis Nelson	T	3	77	Baltimore Colts

== Future non-conference opponents ==
Announced schedules as of July 9, 2026.

2026	2027	2028	2029	2030
St. Francis (IL)	at Eastern Illinois	Eastern Illinois	at Wisconsin	at Northwestern
at Western Illinois	at Missouri	at Illinois		
at Northern Illinois	Valparaiso			
Eastern Illinois				
