= Mitch Hannahs =

American college baseball coach

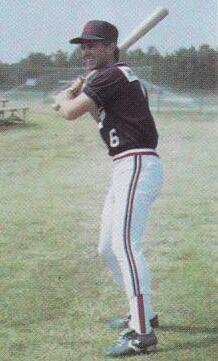
- Hannahs with the Yarmouth-Dennis Red Sox in 1988

Current position
- Title: Head coach
- Team: South Florida
- Conference: The American
- Record: 63–46 (.578)

Biographical details
- Born: September 16, 1967 (age 59); Cambridge, Ohio, U.S.

Playing career
- 1986–1989: Indiana State
- Position: 2B

Coaching career (HC unless noted)
- 1995–1999: Indiana State (Asst.)
- 2001: Indiana State (Asst.)
- 2002–2010: Lincoln Trail College
- 2014–2024: Indiana State
- 2025–present: South Florida

Head coaching record
- Overall: 418–260–1 (.616) (NCAA); 270–179–1 (.601) (NJCAA)
- Tournaments: NCAA: 8–10; MVC: 21–16; AAC: 2–2

Accomplishments and honors

Championships
- 2x MVC regular season (2023, 2024); 2x MVC Tourney (2019, 2023); 2x GRAC regular season (2006, 2007); 2x Region 24 Championship (2005, 2007)

Awards
- 2× Missouri Valley Coach of the Year (2023, 2024)

Mitchell Linn Hannahs (born September 16, 1967) is an American college baseball coach, currently serving as head coach of the South Florida Bulls baseball program. He was named to that position on June 8, 2024. Prior to that, he was the head coach of the Indiana State Sycamores. He also previously served as president of Lincoln Trail College and was a member of the 1989 College Baseball All-America Team, selected by the American Baseball Coaches Association.

== Playing career ==
Hannahs was a standout second baseman for the Sycamores, helping them to 172 wins and three NCAA tournament appearances in his four seasons. He continues to rank highly in many offensive categories in the all-time Indiana State record book, including sixth in batting average, second in runs, and fourth in hits. In his senior season, Hannahs batted .428 with 101 hits and 76 runs en route to earning a place on the ABCA All-America Team. In 1988, he played collegiate summer baseball with the Yarmouth–Dennis Red Sox of the Cape Cod Baseball League and was named a league all-star. He was drafted by the Milwaukee Brewers in the 16th round of the 1989 MLB draft and played three seasons in the minors, reaching the class-AA El Paso Diablos.

== Coaching and administrative career ==
After ending his playing career, Hannahs twice served as an assistant at Indiana State, from 1995 to 1999 and again in 2001, before accepted the head coaching position at Lincoln Trail College. He served nine seasons in that capacity; claiming two Region 24 (NJCAA) titles and two Great Rivers Athletic Conference championships, accumulating a record of 108–96. He added athletic director to his duties. After the 2010 season, he was named President of Lincoln Trail College, and remained in that position until the summer of 2013, when he accepted the head coaching position at Indiana State

In August 2017 Hannahs signed a contract extension through the 2020 season. On July 19, 2019, following a successful season and his 2nd NCAA Tourney berth; Hannahs inked a 2-year contract extension that will take him through the 2022 season. A contract clause, enables a contract extension if he leads the Sycamores to an NCAA tournament berth. On May 31, 2021, the Sycamores were selected for their 11th NCAA tournament.

On June 8, 2024, Mitch Hannahs accepted the Head Coaching Job at South Florida.

== Head coaching record ==
Hannahs' NCAA Division I Head Coach record.

Record table
Season	Team	Overall	Conference	Standing	Postseason
Lincoln Trail College Statesmen (Great Rivers Athletic Conference) (2002–2010)
2002	Lincoln Trail College	21–26			
2003	Lincoln Trail College	29–23			
2004	Lincoln Trail College	28–22			
2005	Lincoln Trail College	39–23			
2006	Lincoln Trail College	35–16			
2007	Lincoln Trail College	37–15			
2008	Lincoln Trail College	24–22			
2009	Lincoln Trail College	23–17–1	17–7	3rd	
2010	Lincoln Trail College	34–15	19–5	2nd	
Lincoln Trail College (NJCAA):		270–179–1	36–12		
Indiana State Sycamores (Missouri Valley Conference) (2014–2024)
2014	Indiana State	35–18	14–7	2nd	NCAA Bloomington Regional
2015	Indiana State	28–26	8–13	7th	
2016	Indiana State	35–21	13–8	2nd	
2017	Indiana State	29–26	12–9	3rd	
2018	Indiana State	31–24	11–10	5th	
2019	Indiana State	43–18	13–8	3rd	NCAA Nashville Regional
2020	Indiana State	8–6	0–0	n/a	Season canceled due to COVID-19
2021	Indiana State	31–21	14–10	2nd	NCAA Nashville Regional
2022	Indiana State	26–22–1	10–10–1	5th	
2023	Indiana State	45–17	24–3	1st	NCAA Fort Worth Super Regional
2024	Indiana State	44–15	22–5	1st	NCAA Lexington Regional
Indiana State:		355–214–1	141–83–1		
South Florida Bulls (American Athletic Conference) (2025–present)
2025	South Florida	31–25	16–11	3rd	AAC Tournament
2026	South Florida	32–21	11–16	9th	
South Florida:		63–46	27–27		
Total:		418–260–1			
National champion Postseason invitational champion Conference regular season champion Conference regular season and conference tournament champion Division regular season champion Division regular season and conference tournament champion Conference tournament champion

== See also ==
- List of current NCAA Division I baseball coaches
