= Steve Holm =

American baseball player

- Catcher
- Born: October 21, 1979 (age 47); Sacramento, California, U.S.
- Batted: Right Threw: Right

MLB debut
- April 4, 2008, for the San Francisco Giants

Last MLB appearance
- April 30, 2011, for the Minnesota Twins

MLB statistics
- Batting average: .264
- Home runs: 1
- Runs batted in: 6
- Stats at Baseball Reference

Teams
- San Francisco Giants (2008–2009); Minnesota Twins (2011)

Stephen Robert Holm (born October 21, 1979) is an American baseball coach and former catcher in Major League Baseball (MLB). He played for the San Francisco Giants and Minnesota Twins between 2008 and 2011, and is currently the head baseball coach of the Illinois State Redbirds.

== Amateur career ==
Holm attended Sacramento's McClatchy High School, where he played shortstop. He played college baseball at Oral Roberts for coach Sunny Golloway from 1998 to 2001, and earned 3rd Team All-American honors as a shortstop for ORU in 2000. In 2000, he played collegiate summer baseball with the Hyannis Mets of the Cape Cod Baseball League.

== Professional career ==
=== San Francisco Giants ===
Holm was drafted by the Giants in the 17th round in 2001. He beat Eliezer Alfonzo and Guillermo Rodríguez to earn a position on the major-league roster in 2008 spring training, but got sent down for Eliezer Alfonzo on July 1, 2008. He got re-called on July 23, 2008.

After playing for a short period of time on the Giants in 2009, he was sent back to Triple-A Fresno. Eli Whiteside then became the back-up catcher when Holm was unable to be re-called. Holm was designated for assignment to clear room for Matt Downs on June 16.

=== Minnesota Twins ===
In December 2010, Holm signed a minor league contract with the Minnesota Twins.

On April 14, 2011, Holm was called up to the major leagues during a Joe Mauer injury. After being sent down, he was designated for assignment on May 15. After the 2011 season, he elected for free agency.

=== Rockies and Marlins ===
Holm signed a minor league contract with the Colorado Rockies on February 9, 2012. He was released on March 31.

On May 3, 2012, Holm signed a minor league deal with the Miami Marlins. However, on July 5, he was released, after hitting .135 in Triple-A.

== Coaching career ==
Steve Holm
Current position
- Title: Head coach
- Team: Illinois State
- Conference: Missouri Valley
- Record: 164–185

Biographical details
- Born: October 21, 1979 (age 47); Sacramento, California
- Education: Oral Roberts University

Playing career
- 2000–2001: Oral Roberts
- Position: Shortstop

Coaching career (HC unless noted)
- 2013-2016: Sacramento State (P)
- 2017–2018: Purdue (P)
- 2019–present: Illinois State

Head coaching record
- Overall: 164–185
- Tournaments: MVC: 6–8; NCAA: 2–2

Accomplishments and honors

Awards
- Summit League Player of the Year (2000); Missouri Valley Coach of the Year (2019)

Holm coached the 2013–2016 seasons at Sacramento State University, serving as the teams pitching coach.

On July 19, 2016, Holm was hired by Purdue University to serve as their pitching coach.

On June 22, 2018, Illinois State University announced that Holm had been hired as the new head coach of its baseball team.

== Head coaching record ==
Record table
Season	Team	Overall	Conference	Standing	Postseason
Illinois State Redbirds (Missouri Valley Conference) (2019–present)
2019	Illinois State	36–26	14–7	T-1st	NCAA Regional Final
2020	Illinois State	7–9	0–0		Season canceled due to COVID-19
2021	Illinois State	23–34	12–15	6th	MVC tournament
2022	Illinois State	20–31	7–14	7th	
2023	Illinois State	20–30	9–18	9th	
2024	Illinois State	30–27	16–11	4th	MVC tournament
2025	Illinois State	28–28	15–12	5th	MVC tournament
Illinois State:		164–185	73–77		
Total:		164–185			
National champion Postseason invitational champion Conference regular season champion Conference regular season and conference tournament champion Division regular season champion Division regular season and conference tournament champion Conference tournament champion

== See also ==
- List of current NCAA Division I baseball coaches
