= Clifford E. Horton =

American football, basketball, and baseball coach

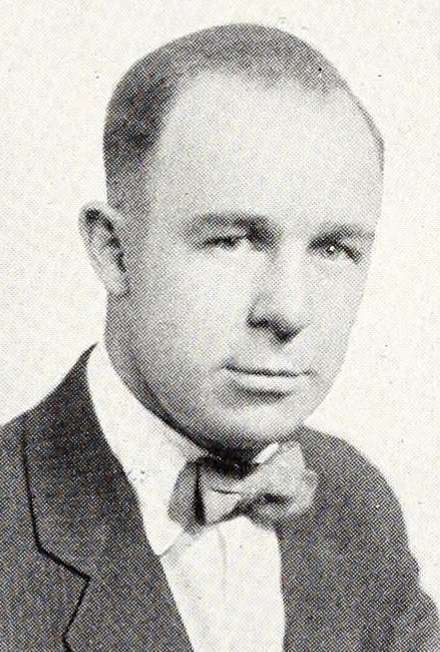
- Horton pictured in The Index 1924, Illinois State yearbook

Biographical details
- Born: December 31, 1892; Shelton, Washington, U.S.
- Died: April 14, 1981 (aged 88); Normal, Illinois, U.S.
- Education: Clark University; Indiana University; New York University; University of California; Springfield College

Coaching career (HC unless noted)

Football
- 1923–1924: Illinois State

Basketball
- 1923–1925: Illinois State

Baseball
- ?–1923: Clark
- 1924–1932: Illinois State

Administrative career (AD unless noted)
- 1923–?: Illinois State

Head coaching record
- Overall: 4–8–4 (football); 8–20 (basketball); 43–61 (baseball, excluding Clark)

Clifford Emory “Pop” Horton (December 31, 1892 – April 14, 1981) was an American professor in physical education, collegiate coach, and founder of the oldest collegiate circus in the U.S., the Gamma Phi Circus.

== Early life ==
Clifford Horton was born on December 31, 1892, in Shelton, Washington to C.E. and Anna L. Horton. He began tumbling at 11 years old and 10 years after he started, he organized his first circus program around a core of gymnasts at an Indiana YMCA. In 1919, he graduated from the Y.M.C.A. College of Physical Education, now known as Springfield College in Springfield, Massachusetts. In 1923, he got his master's degree from Clark University in Worcester, Massachusetts. On June 15, 1921, he married Garnetta E. Schneid in Madison, Wisconsin.

== Early career ==
Before his time at Illinois State University, Clifford Horton worked as the physical director at the Y.M.C.A. in Spokane, Washington; Michigan City, Indiana; and Mittineague, Massachusetts. He was a student instructor in physical education at Springfield College in Springfield, Massachusetts and the director of playgrounds in Hamilton, Ontario. He also worked as the instructor in physical education at Ohio Wesleyan University in Delaware, Ohio; the director of physical education at the public schools of San Luis Obispo, California; the supervisor of playgrounds in Gardener, Massachusetts, and the instructor in physical education and coach of baseball and soccer at Clark University in Worcester, Massachusetts.

While working at Ohio Wesleyan, Horton helped organize the Beta chapter of Gamma Phi, an honorary gymnastics fraternity. He was also a charter member of Normal’s American Legion Post and was a second lieutenant in the Infantry for the U.S. Army from 1918-1919.

== Life at Illinois State University ==
In 1923, Clifford Horton became a faculty member at Illinois State Normal University, now known as Illinois State University. During the 1920’s, he was the only coach of athletics that ISU had. He was also the ninth head football coach at ISU, where he served for two seasons from 1923-1924. In 1923 and with the help of Fred Young, the sports editor of The Pantagraph in Bloomington, they changed the nickname of ISU from the Teachers and the Fighting Teachers to the Redbirds, which is the nickname for the school mascot. Within a year, he established an intramural sports program, which ended up as one of the finest in the Midwest. In 1929, Horton established the Gamma Phi fraternity, renamed the Gamma Phi Circus in 1931. In 1938, he became the head of the physical education department and held the position until he retired in 1961. In 1930, he became a member of the Athletic Board of Control.

Horton served as the chairman of the board and presided at every meeting. As the board was the governing power behind Normal athletics, his job was to approve athletic schedules, eligibility of athletes, expenditures, awarding of official “N’s” and sweaters, and to appoint the managers for all major sports. The objectives of the Gamma Phi fraternity were promoting the interest of physical education among the students at the university, to honor gymnastic excellence in the individual members of the student body and faculty of the university by election to membership. All of these things were under Horton’s direct supervision as the head director of physical education.

=== Head coaching record ===
==== Football ====
Year	Team	Overall	Conference	Standing	Bowl/playoffs
Illinois State Redbirds (Illinois Intercollegiate Athletic Conference) (1923–1924)
1923	Illinois State	2–4–2	2–3–2	14th	
1924	Illinois State	2–4–2	2–4–2	T–16th	
Illinois State:		4–8–4	4–7–4		
Total:		4–8–4			

== Life outside of ISU ==
When Clifford Horton was not working at Illinois State Normal University, he was a part of many things outside of the school. One of his most prized efforts was helping to organize the first public library in Normal. He was active in work with the Red Cross, the Boy Scouts, and community recreation activities. He also served as director of the McLean County chapter for Crippled Children's (now called AbilityFirst), summer camp for 15 years in Lake Bloomington in Illinois. He was a charter member of Normal’s American Legion Post and the commissioner of the Interstate Intercollegiate Athletic Conference from 1950 to 1965.

== Death ==
On April, 14th, 1981, Horton died in Bloomington, Illinois at 88.

== Legacy ==
In 1961, ISU began construction on a health and physical education building which was named after Horton, the Horton Field House, still in use. In 1966, he donated $5,000 to ISU’s University Foundation to establish scholarships in physical education, known as the Clifford E. Horton Fund. In 1968, he was named Normal’s Outstanding Citizen of the year by the town’s Chamber of Commerce. He was inducted into the Illinois State Athletics Percy Family Hall of Fame in 1974.
