= Joe Cogdal =

American football and basketball coach

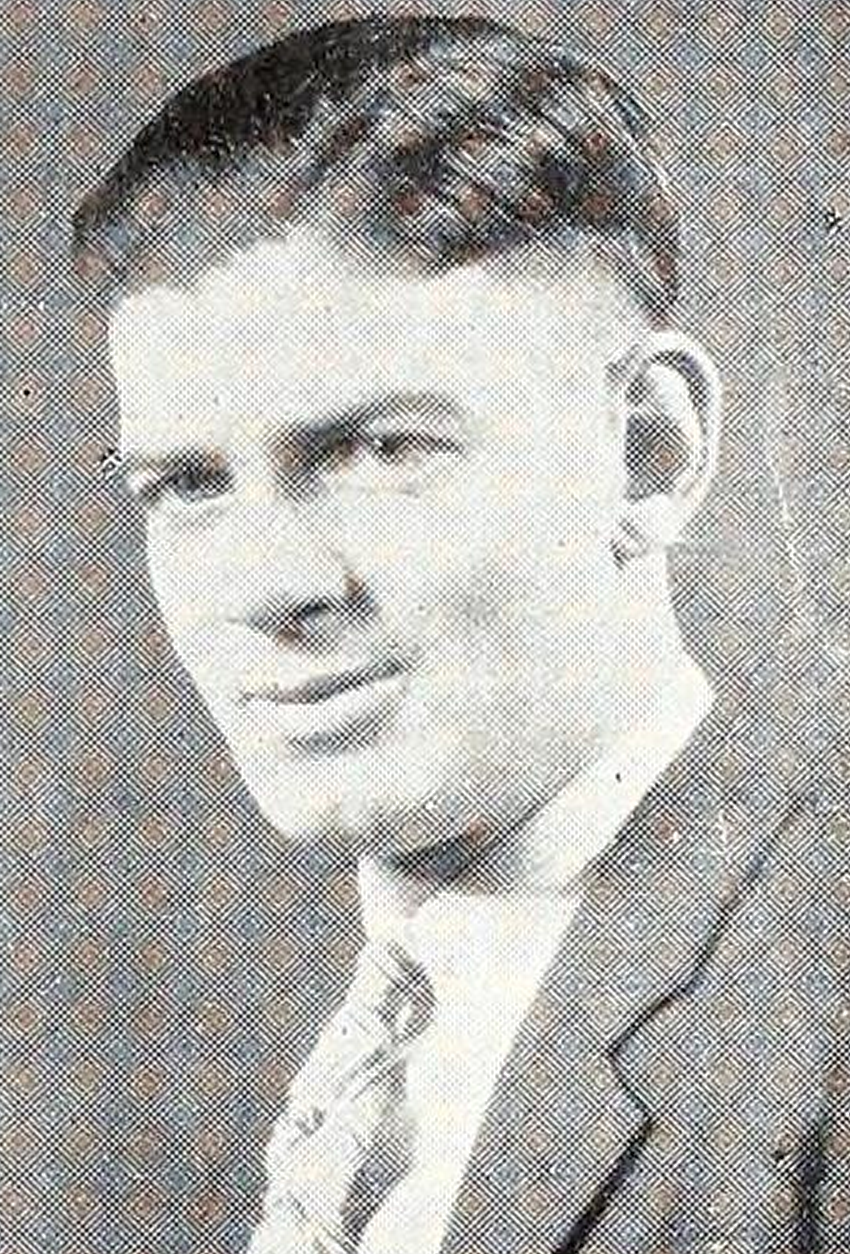
- Cogdal pictured in The Index 1928, Illinois State yearbook

Biographical details
- Born: March 22, 1897; Atwood, Illinois, U.S.
- Died: July 3, 1978 (aged 81); Normal, Illinois, U.S.
- Education: James Millikin University (AB 1921)

Coaching career (HC unless noted)

Football
- 1923–1924: Findlay
- 1927–1930: Illinois State

Basketball
- 1923–1925: Findlay
- 1927–1949: Illinois State

Head coaching record
- Overall: 10–34–4 (football); 282–196 (basketball)

Joseph T. Cogdal (March 22, 1897 – July 3, 1978) was an American football and basketball coach. He served as the head football at Findlay College—now known as the University of Findlay–in Findlay, Ohio and Illinois State Normal University—now known as Illinois State University—in Normal, Illinois from 1927 to 1930.

After arriving at the university in 1927, he remained until at least the 1960s. He died in 1978.

Cogdal competed in track and field collegiately for the Millikin Big Blue.

== Head coaching record ==
=== Football ===
Year	Team	Overall	Conference	Standing	Bowl/playoffs
Findlay Oilers (Independent) (1923–1924)
1923	Findlay	1–8			
1924	Findlay	1–4–2			
Findlay:		2–12–2			
Illinois State Redbirds (Illinois Intercollegiate Athletic Conference) (1927–1930)
1927	Illinois State	4–4	4–4	T–12th	
1928	Illinois State	2–6	2–6	T–16th	
1929	Illinois State	1–5–2	1–5–2	20th	
1928	Illinois State	1–7	1–7	19th	
Illinois State:		8–22–2	8–22–2		
Total:		10–34–4			
