= George Binnewies =

American football, basketball, and baseball coach

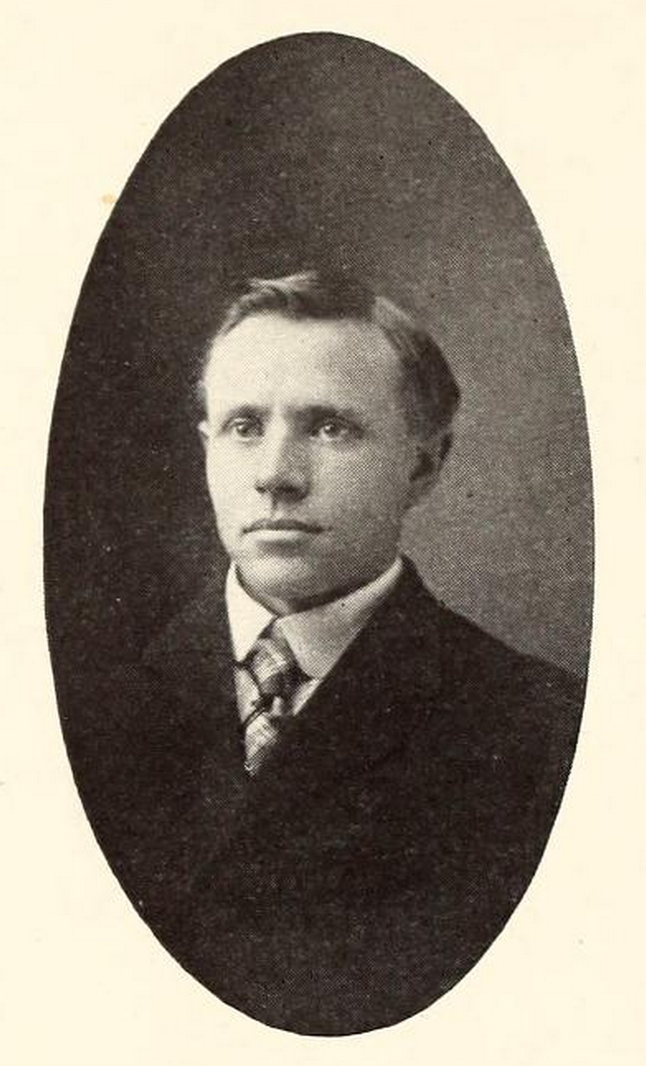
- Binnewies pictured in The Index 1909, Illinois State yearbook

Biographical details
- Born: September 18, 1879; Harvard, Illinois, U.S.
- Died: June 4, 1968 (aged 88); McLean, Virginia, U.S.
- Education: DePauw University (1907)

Coaching career (HC unless noted)

Football
- 1907: Shurtleff
- 1908–1909: Illinois State

Basketball
- 1908–1910: Illinois State

Baseball
- 1909: Illinois State

Head coaching record
- Overall: 9–5–1 (football); 17–5 (basketball); 9–1 (baseball)

Wilfred George Binnewies (September 18, 1879 – June 4, 1968) was an American football, basketball, and baseball coach. He was the seventh head football coach at Illinois State University in Normal, Illinois, serving for two seasons, from 1908 to 1909, and compiling a record of 9–5–1.
