= Don Karnes =

American football and basketball coach

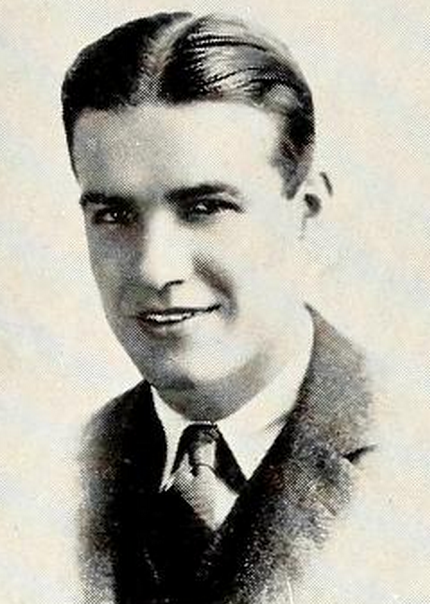
- Karnes pictured in The Index 1926, Illinois State yearbook

Biographical details
- Born: September 28, 1902; Fairbury, Illinois, U.S.
- Died: April 23, 1982 (aged 79); Fairbury, Illinois, U.S.

Playing career

Basketball
- 1923–1925: Illinois
- Position: Forward

Coaching career (HC unless noted)

Football
- 1925–1926: Illinois State

Basketball
- 1925–1926: Illinois State

Head coaching record
- Overall: 5–10 (football); 9–20 (basketball)

Thomas Donald Karnes (September 28, 1902 – April 23, 1982) was an American football and basketball coach. He was the tenth head football coach at Illinois State Normal University—now known as Illinois State University—in Normal, Illinois, serving for two seasons, from 1925 to 1926, and compiling a record of 5–10. Karnes was also the head basketball coach at Illinois State from 1925 to 1927, tallying a mark of 9–20.

In 1955, he immigrated to Brazil.

== Head coaching record ==
=== Football ===
Year	Team	Overall	Conference	Standing	Bowl/playoffs
Illinois State Redbirds (Illinois Intercollegiate Athletic Conference) (1925–1926)
1925	Illinois State	1–6	1–6	19th	
1926	Illinois State	4–4	4–4	T–10th	
Illinois State:		5–10	5–10		
Total:		5–10			
