= Harrison Russell =

American sports coach

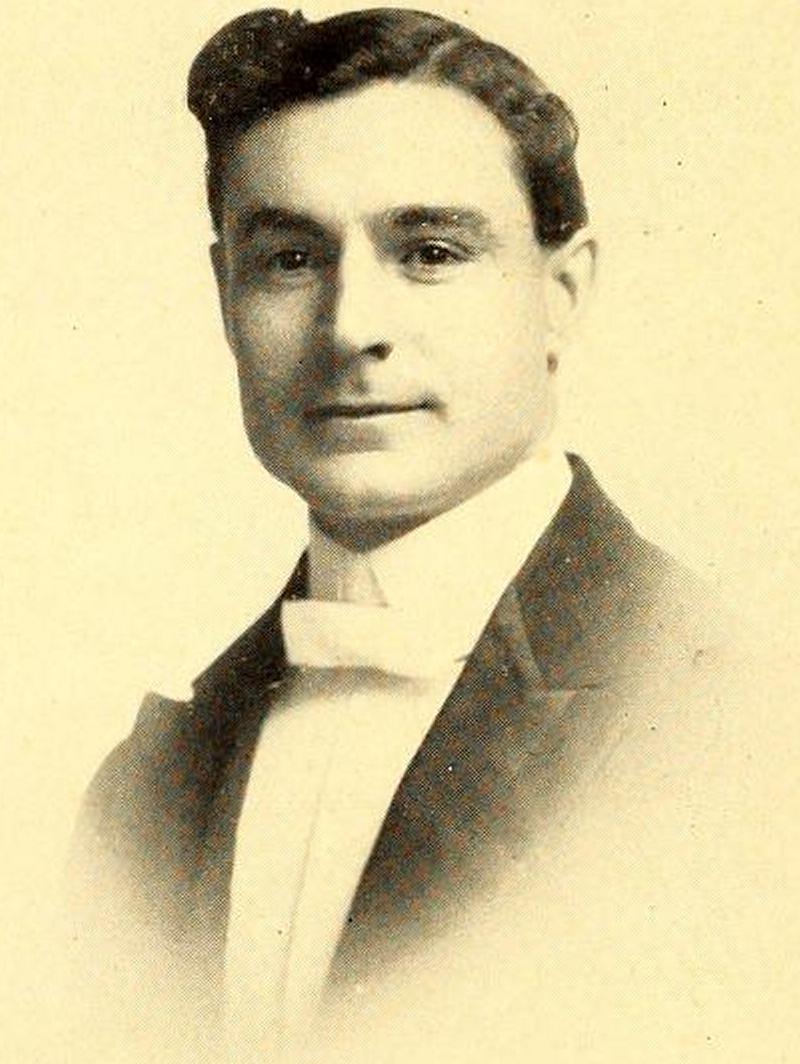
- Russell pictured in The Index 1913, Illinois State yearbook

Biographical details
- Born: November 27, 1881; Peotone, Illinois, U.S.
- Died: 1968 (aged 86–87)
- Education: Harvard University

Coaching career (HC unless noted)

Football
- 1912–1922: Illinois State

Basketball
- 1910–1923: Illinois State
- 1925–1926: Clark

Baseball
- 1911–1923: Illinois State

Head coaching record
- Overall: 15–43–10 (football); 89–113 (basketball); 24–41–1 (baseball)

Henry Harrison Russell (November 27, 1881 – 1968) was an American football, basketball, and baseball coach. He was the eighth head football coach at Illinois State University in Normal, Illinois, serving from 1912 to 1922 and compiling a record of 15–43–10.

Russell later taught geography at Clark University and Bloomsburg State Teachers College. He was Clark's men's basketball coach during the 1925–26 season.
