= B. C. Edwards =

American football and basketball coach

B .C. Edwards
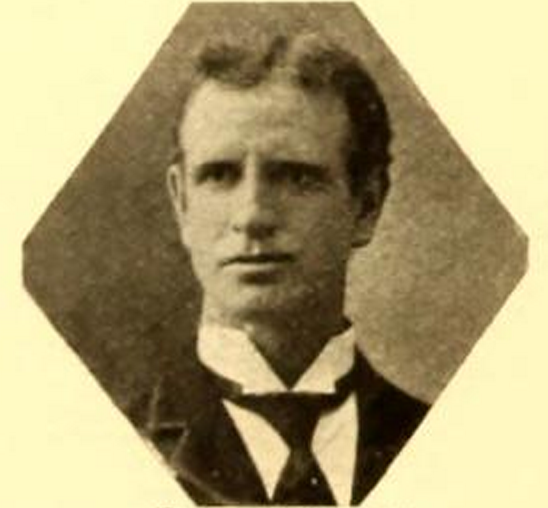
- Edwards pictured in The Index 1898, Illinois State yearbook

Biographical details
- Born: October 21, 1865; Bloomingburg, Ohio, U.S.
- Died: November 2, 1950 (aged 85); Troy, Montana, U.S.
- Education: Boston School of Oratory (Emerson) (1892–96); University of Illinois at Urbana-Champaign (1903–04)

Coaching career (HC unless noted)

Football
- 1897: Illinois State

Basketball
- 1898–1902: Illinois State

Head coaching record
- Overall: 1–5 (football); 14–2 (basketball)

Benjamin Chase Edwards (October 21, 1865 – November 2, 1950) was the third head football coach for the Illinois State Redbirds in Normal, Illinois and he held that position for the 1897 season. His overall coaching record at ISU was 1 wins, 5 losses, and 0 ties. This ranks him 19th at ISU in terms of total wins and 19th at ISU in terms of winning percentage.

He taught reading, gymnastics and physical culture at the university from 1896 to 1903. He later lived in Cassia County, Idaho and Montana. He married Anna Blake Cunningham of Normal, Illinois (born 1869) on October 30, 1907 at Burley, Idaho.

Edwards died at his son's home in Troy, Montana in 1950. He was interred at Conrad Memorial Cemetery. He was survived by two sons, John Gifford and Donald M. and a daughter, Helen Edwards. His wife, Anna died in 1955 at Burley, Idaho, aged 86.
