= John P. Stewart =

American football and basketball coach

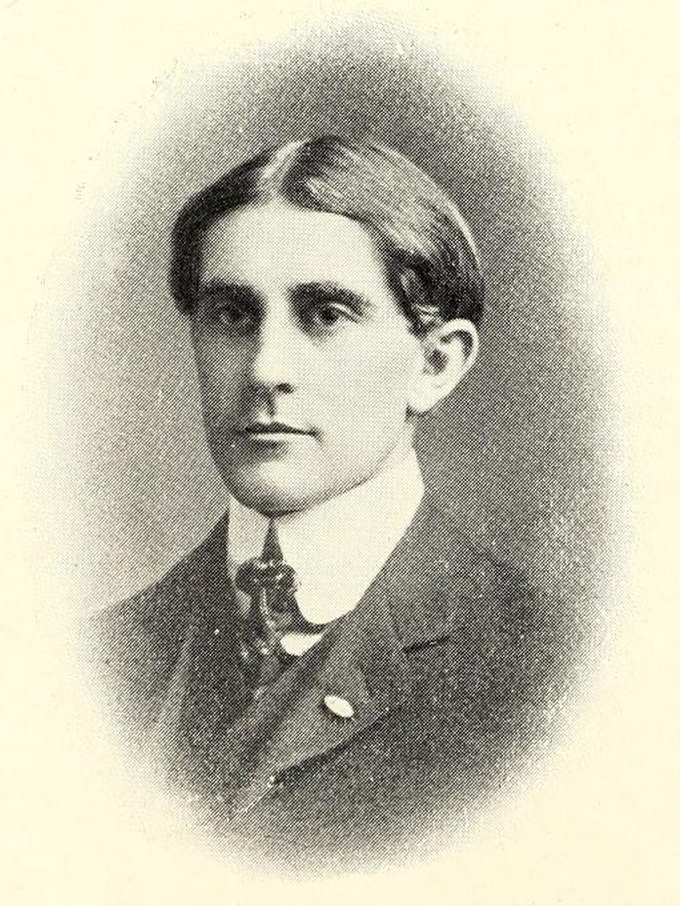
- Stewart pictured in The Index 1906, Illinois State yearbook

Biographical details
- Born: June 1, 1876; Biggsville, Illinois, U.S.
- Died: January 27, 1922 (aged 42); York, Pennsylvania, U.S.
- Education: Illinois State Normal University (1899); University of Illinois; Cornell University (A.B. 1902)

Coaching career (HC unless noted)

Football
- 1903–1906: Illinois State

Basketball
- 1903–1906: Illinois State

Head coaching record
- Overall: 14–11–1 (football); 20–10 (basketball)

John Pogue Stewart (June 1, 1876 – January 27, 1922) was an American football and basketball coach. He was the fifth head football coach at Illinois State University in Normal, Illinois, serving for four seasons, from 1903 to 1906, compiling are record of 14–11–1.

Stewart taught sciences including biology and physics at Illinois high schools before and during his time at Illinois State. He also studied horticulture at Cornell University, receiving his A.B. in 1902.

Stewart was later a professor at Pennsylvania State University as well as a fruit grower, botanist and horticulturist. He died at his York, Pennsylvania home in 1922. At the time of his death, he was the head of the department of pomology at Penn State.
