= Illinois State Redbirds baseball =

College baseball team (founded in 1890)

Illinois State Redbirds Baseball
- 2026 Illinois State Redbirds baseball team
- Founded: 1890
- University: Illinois State University
- Head coach: Steve Holm (8th season)
- Conference: Missouri Valley
- Location: Normal, Illinois
- Home stadium: Duffy Bass Field (Capacity: 1,000)
- Nickname: Redbirds
- Colors: Red and white

College World Series champions
- 1969 (College Division)

NCAA tournament appearances
- 2019, 2010, 1994, 1976

Conference tournament champions
- 2010, 1994

The Illinois State Redbirds baseball team is the varsity intercollegiate athletic team of Illinois State University in Normal, Illinois. The team competes at the Division I level of the NCAA and is a member of the Missouri Valley Conference.

== History ==
The program's first year of competition was 1890. 16 players that played for Illinois State have played in Major League Baseball.

== Illinois State in the NCAA Tournament ==
Year	Record	Pct	Notes
1976	1–2	.333	Mideast Regional
1994	0–2	.000	Midwest I Regional
2010	1–2	.333	Louisville Regional
2019	2–2	.500	Louisville Regional
TOTALS	4–8	.333	

== Stadium ==
Illinois State plays at Duffy Bass Field, a 1,000-seat (1,200 including non-seating areas) facility located in the northwest corner of the university's campus in Normal. The field is named for the school's winningest baseball coach in its history.

== Head coaches ==
Records are through the end of the 2024 season

Year(s)	Coach	Seasons	W-L-T	Pct
1909	George Binnewies	1	9–1	.900
1911–1923	Harrison Russell	13	27–54–1	.329
1924–1932	Clifford Horton	9	43–61	.414
1933–1946	Howard Hancock	14	120–112–2	.513
1947–1963	Harold Frye	17	224–207–2	.517
1964–1988	Duffy Bass	25	713–457–18	.600
1989–2002	Jeff Stewart	14	380–403–1	.485
2003–2009	Jim Brownlee	7	157–208	.430
2010–2014	Mark Kingston	5	173–102	.629
2015–2018	Bo Durkac	4	82-134	.380
2019–present	Steve Holm	6	136–157	.464
Totals	11 coaches	116 seasons	2,057–1,887–24	.521

== Redbirds in the Major Leagues ==
= MLB All-Star

Athlete	Years in MLB	MLB teams
Ed Kinsella	1905, 1910	Pittsburgh Pirates, St. Louis Browns
Buzz Capra	1971–1977	New York Mets, Atlanta Braves
Dave Bergman	1975, 1977–1992	New York Yankees, Houston Astros, San Francisco Giants, Detroit Tigers
Tom Wieghaus	1981, 1983–1984	Montreal Expos, Houston Astros
Paul Wagner	1992–1999	Pittsburgh Pirates, Milwaukee Brewers, Cleveland Indians
Dan Kolb	1999-2007	Texas Rangers, Milwaukee Brewers, Atlanta Braves, Pittsburgh Pirates
Matt Herges	1999–2009	Los Angeles Dodgers, Montreal Expos, San Diego Padres, San Francisco Giants, Arizona Diamondbacks, Florida Marlins, Colorado Rockies, Cleveland Indians
Jason Karnuth	2001, 2005	St. Louis Cardinals, Detroit Tigers
Eric Eckenstahler	2002–2003	Detroit Tigers
Jason Pearson	2002–2003	San Diego Padres, St. Louis Cardinals
Neal Cotts	2003–2009, 2013–2015	Chicago White Sox, Chicago Cubs, Texas Rangers, Milwaukee Brewers, Minnesota Twins
Jeremy Accardo	2005–2012	San Francisco Giants, Toronto Blue Jays, Baltimore Orioles, Cleveland Indians, Oakland Athletics
Brock Stewart	2016–present	Los Angeles Dodgers, Toronto Blue Jays, Minnesota Twins
Paul DeJong	2017–present	St. Louis Cardinals, Toronto Blue Jays, San Francisco Giants, Chicago White Sox, Kansas City Royals
Ryan Court	2019	Seattle Mariners
Owen Miller	2021–present	Cleveland Guardians, Milwaukee Brewers, Colorado Rockies

Source: Illinois State media guide
