= Duffy Bass Field =

Baseball field in Normal, Illinois

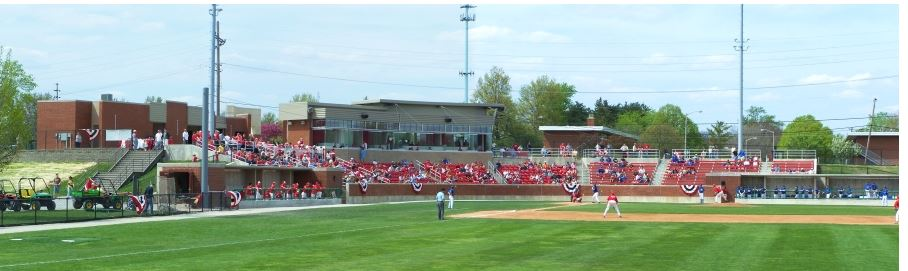
- Duffy Bass Field
- Interactive map of Duffy Bass Field
- Location: Gregory Street, Normal, IL, USA
- Coordinates: 40.515296°N 88.999949°W
- Owner: Illinois State University
- Operator: Illinois State University
- Capacity: 1,200 (1,000 seated)
- Surface: FieldTurf infield, Natural grass outfield (2013–present)
- Scoreboard: Electronic
- Field size: Left field: 330 feet (100 m); Left center field: 375 feet (114 m); Center field: 400 feet (120 m); Right center field: 375 feet (114 m); Right field: 330 feet (100 m)
- Public transit: Connect Transit

Construction
- Opened: 1988
- Renovated: 2008–09
- Architect: Browning Day Mullins Dierdorff Architects (Renovations)
- General contractor: McCoy Construction (Renovations)

Tenant
- Illinois State Redbirds baseball (1988–present)

Duffy Bass Field is a baseball venue in Normal, Illinois, USA. It is home to the Illinois State Redbirds baseball team of the Division I Missouri Valley Conference. It was built in 1988 and has a capacity of 1,200 spectators, 1,000 of which is seated. The field is also home to the University High School Pioneers baseball team.

== History ==
In both 1992 and 2003, the field was awarded the Professional Grounds Management Society's Honor Award for the excellent condition of its playing surface.

Prior to 2008, the facility featured little seating and other amenities around the playing field. In 2006, however, a $3.4 million renovation project was announced, and construction began on July 15, 2008. Part of then-athletic director Sheahon Zenger's initiative to improve Redbird athletic facilities, the project added 1,000 stadium seats, restrooms, concession stands, and ticket windows. It also upgraded the venue's press box and dugouts. An electronic scoreboard was added later. Browning Day Mullins Dierdorff Architects designed the stadium structure, while McCoy Construction built the new facilities.

In fall 2012, a FieldTurf infield was installed at the facility, while the outfield surface remained natural grass. Prior to the renovation, the field's surface had been entirely natural grass.

The 2013 & 2019 Missouri Valley Conference baseball tournament was held at Duffy Bass Field.

== Naming ==
The field is named for former Illinois State baseball coach Duffy Bass. During Bass's 1964–1988 tenure, the Redbirds' record was 713–457–18. This record included a 1969 national championship in the College Division (the NCAA's now-defunct small school division).

Duffy Bass Field has been home to the Horenberger/Bass Baseball Classic, an annual game which commemorates Bass and Illinois Wesleyan University's (in nearby Bloomington) former baseball coach Jack Horenberger. First played in 2004, the game alternates between Duffy Bass and Illinois Wesleyan's Jack Horenberger Field. Illinois State has won four of six classics played. The game was rained out in 2009, 2011, and 2012.

== See also ==
- List of NCAA Division I baseball venues
