= 2024 Evansville Purple Aces baseball team =

American college baseball season

2024 Evansville Purple Aces baseball

MVC Tournament champions NCAA Greenville Regional champions

NCAA Knoxville Super Regional, 1–2
- Conference: Missouri Valley Conference

Ranking
- Coaches: No. 23
- Record: 39–26 (17–10 MVC)
- Head coach: Wes Carroll (16th season)
- Hitting coach: Matt Wollenzin (2nd season)
- Pitching coach: Tyler Shipley (2nd season)
- Home stadium: Charles H. Braun Stadium

2024 Missouri Valley Conference baseball standings
	Conf.						Overall
Team	W		L		T	PCT	W		L		T	PCT
Indiana State ‍†‍‍^{y}	22	–	5	–	0	.815	44	–	15	–	0	.746
Murray State ‍‍‍	17	–	10	–	0	.630	37	–	20	–	0	.649
No. 16 Evansville ‍‍‡‍^{y}	17	–	10	–	0	.630	39	–	26	–	0	.600
UIC ‍‍‍	16	–	11	–	0	.593	35	–	20	–	0	.636
Illinois State ‍‍‍	16	–	11	–	0	.593	30	–	27	–	0	.526
Southern Illinois ‍‍‍	12	–	15	–	0	.444	33	–	27	–	0	.550
Belmont ‍‍‍	12	–	15	–	0	.444	26	–	32	–	0	.448
Missouri State ‍‍‍	11	–	16	–	0	.407	23	–	34	–	0	.404
Valparaiso ‍‍‍	6	–	21	–	0	.222	14	–	38	–	0	.269
Bradley ‍‍‍	6	–	21	–	0	.222	13	–	37	–	1	.265
† – Conference champion ‡ – Tournament champion y – Invited to the NCAA Tournament; As of June 8, 2024; Rankings from D1Baseball

The 2024 Evansville Purple Aces baseball team represented the University of Evansville as a member of the Missouri Valley Conference during the 2024 NCAA Division I baseball season. The Purple Aces played their home games at Charles H. Braun Stadium.

== Previous season ==
The Purple Aces finished the 2023 season with a trip to the MVC Championship Game against Indiana State, winning one out of two games before being eliminated. For the season, Evansville compiled a record of 37–24 and finished fourth in the MVC with a 15–12 mark.

== Offseason ==
=== Coaching changes ===
The following coaches left the program:

- Volunteer assistant Evan Berkey left to play for the Ottawa Titans.

The following coaches were hired:

- Griffin McCormick was hired as a volunteer assistant.
- Jarrett Blunt was hired as a graduate assistant.

=== Departures ===
==== 2023 MLB draft ====
Round	Pick	Player	Position	Team
Undrafted		Mark Shallenberger	OF	None (Note: Shallenberger returned to Evansville after going undrafted in the 2023 Major League Baseball draft.)

==== Outgoing transfers ====
- OF Blake Herrmann transferred to Oakland City.
- OF Kannon Stull transferred to Olney Central.
- OF Adam Euler transferred to Southern Indiana.
- UTL Caden Crawford transferred to Fort Lauderdale.
- RHP Nate Hardman transferred to Notre Dame.

==== Retirements ====
- RHP Jarrett Blunt
- UTL Danny Borgstrom
- LHP Tyler Denu
- 2B Brendon Herrin
- RHP John MacCauley
- C Max Malley
- LHP Michael Parks
- RHP Garrett Presko
- UTL Eric Roberts
- RHP Ryan Schneider

==== Other ====
- RHP Kieren Hall signed with the Perth Heat of the Australian Baseball League (ABL).
- LHP Willard Peterson was suspended.

=== Additions ===
==== Recruiting class ====
The following players signed National Letter of Intents to play for Evansville in 2024.

Player	Hometown	High School
Pitchers
Kenton Deverman	Dardenne Prairie, Missouri	Fort Zumwalt West (MO)
Kevin Reed	Paragon, Indiana	Martinsville (IN)
Kellen Roberts	Monroe, Michigan	Monroe (MI)
Hitters
Chance Bentley	Connersville, Indiana	Connersville (IN)
Charlie Longmeier	Seymour, Indiana	Seymour (IN)
Aaron Nehls	Newburgh, Indiana	Evansville North (IN)
Brodie Peart	Markham, Ontario	Peoples Christian Academy (ON)

==== Incoming transfers ====
- RHP Andrew Dusablon transferred in from Cypress.
- RHP Drew Fieger transferred in from Lincoln Trail.
- LHP Jacob Jarvis transferred in from Jefferson.
- RHP Parker MacCauley transferred in from Tennessee Tech.
- RHP Matt Maloney transferred in from Southwestern Illinois.
- 2B Cal McGinnis transferred in from Bradley.
- OF Harrison Taubert transferred in from Northeast.

==== New walk-ons ====
- C Kaleb Wilkey

== Preseason ==
=== Preseason MVC awards and honors ===
First baseman Chase Hug was named to the Preseason All-MVC Team.

Preseason All-MVC Team
Player	No.	Position	Class
Chase Hug	11	1B	Graduate

=== Coaches poll ===
The MVC baseball coaches' poll was released on February 6, 2024.

MVC Coaches' Poll
Predicted finish	Team	Votes (1st place)
1	Indiana State	95 (8)
2	Missouri State	89 (1)
3	Evansville	81 (1)
4	Murray State	67
5	Southern Illinois	63
6	Belmont	40
7	Illinois State	39
8	UIC	34
9	Valparaiso	22
10	Bradley	20

== Personnel ==
=== Roster ===
2024 Evansville Purple Aces baseball team
Players
Coaches

#	Pos.	Name	B/T	Height	Weight	Year	Previous school	Home town
0	C	Brendan Hord	R/R	5 ft 10 in (1.78 m)	225 lb (102 kg)	Gr	Kentucky	Lexington, KY
1	OF	Aaron Nehls	R/R	5 ft 10 in (1.78 m)	170 lb (77 kg)	Fr	North HS	Evansville, IN
2	OF	Ty Rumsey	L/R	5 ft 11 in (1.8 m)	165 lb (75 kg)	Jr	North HS	Evansville, IN
3	INF	Brent Widder	R/R	6 ft 0 in (1.83 m)	195 lb (88 kg)	Gr	Sheboygan North HS	Sheboygan, WI
4	INF	Drew Howard	R/R	5 ft 11 in (1.8 m)	175 lb (79 kg)	So	Forest Park HS	Ferdinand, IN
5	INF	Kevin McCormick	L/R	6 ft 1 in (1.85 m)	195 lb (88 kg)	RS So	St. Laurence HS	Orland Park, IL
7	INF	Cal McGinnis	L/R	5 ft 10 in (1.78 m)	175 lb (79 kg)	Jr	Bradley	Kimberly, WI
8	OF	Charlie Longmeier	L/L	5 ft 7 in (1.7 m)	180 lb (82 kg)	Fr	Seymour HS	Seymour, IN
9	INF	Simon Scherry	R/R	6 ft 2 in (1.88 m)	185 lb (84 kg)	Sr	Heritage Hills HS	Santa Claus, IN
10	LHP	Jace Kressin	L/L	6 ft 3 in (1.91 m)	195 lb (88 kg)	Gr	Menomonie HS	Menomonie, WI
11	UTL	Chase Hug	L/L	6 ft 0 in (1.83 m)	190 lb (86 kg)	Gr	Olney Central CC	Indianapolis, IN
12	RHP	Ethan Bell	R/R	6 ft 1 in (1.85 m)	165 lb (75 kg)	RS So	Southridge HS	Huntingburg, IN
14	INF	Ben Stuart	R/R	6 ft 3 in (1.91 m)	195 lb (88 kg)	Jr	William Mason HS	Mason, OH
15	RHP	Max Hansmann	R/R	6 ft 0 in (1.83 m)	195 lb (88 kg)	So	York Community HS	Elmhurst, IL
16	LHP	Kenton Deverman	L/L	6 ft 1 in (1.85 m)	190 lb (86 kg)	Fr	Fort Zumwalt West HS	Dardenne Prairie, MO
17	RHP	Shane Harris	R/R	6 ft 3 in (1.91 m)	215 lb (98 kg)	RS Sr	Louisville	Poseyville, IN
18	INF	Kip Fougerousse	R/R	6 ft 3 in (1.91 m)	225 lb (102 kg)	Sr	Indiana	Linton, IN
20	RHP	Drew Fieger	R/R	6 ft 1 in (1.85 m)	190 lb (86 kg)	Jr	Lincoln Trail CC	Fort Mitchell, KY
21	OF	Harrison Taubert	R/R	6 ft 0 in (1.83 m)	195 lb (88 kg)	Jr	Northeast CC	Casper, WY
24	LHP	Kevin Reed	L/L	5 ft 9 in (1.75 m)	180 lb (82 kg)	Fr	Martinsville HS	Martinsville, IN
25	C	Evan Waggoner	L/R	6 ft 2 in (1.88 m)	205 lb (93 kg)	Jr	Bedford North Lawrence HS	Bedford, IN
26	INF	Brodie Peart	R/R	6 ft 3 in (1.91 m)	185 lb (84 kg)	Fr	Peoples Christian Academy	Markham, ON
27	RHP	Matt Maloney	R/R	5 ft 9 in (1.75 m)	185 lb (84 kg)	Jr	Southwestern Illinois CC	Mokena, IL
29	RHP	Kellen Roberts	R/R	5 ft 10 in (1.78 m)	195 lb (88 kg)	Fr	Monroe HS	Monroe, MI
31	LHP	Jacob Jarvis	L/L	6 ft 2 in (1.88 m)	205 lb (93 kg)	Jr	Jefferson CC	Farmington, MO
32	OF	Mark Shallenberger	L/L	6 ft 2 in (1.88 m)	215 lb (98 kg)	Gr	Saint Louis Priory School	St. Louis, MO
34	RHP	Andrew Dusablon	R/R	6 ft 1 in (1.85 m)	165 lb (75 kg)	RS So	Cypress CC	Palmdale, CA
35	RHP	Nick Smith	R/R	6 ft 5 in (1.96 m)	215 lb (98 kg)	Sr	Boonville HS	Boonville, IN
36	RHP	Elias Hachem	R/R	6 ft 8 in (2.03 m)	240 lb (109 kg)	So	Mount Carmel HS	Oak Park, IL
37	LHP	Jack Taczy	R/R	6 ft 1 in (1.85 m)	180 lb (82 kg)	So	Cary-Grove HS	Fox River Grove, IL
38	C	Kaleb Wilkey	R/R	5 ft 9 in (1.75 m)	185 lb (84 kg)	Fr	Lincoln-Way West HS	Manhattan, IL
40	RHP	Parker MacCauley	L/R	6 ft 3 in (1.91 m)	220 lb (100 kg)	RS So	Tennessee Tech	Paducah, KY
41	C	Chance Bentley	R/R	5 ft 10 in (1.78 m)	205 lb (93 kg)	Fr	Connersville HS	Connersville, IN
42	LHP	Donovan Schultz	R/L	6 ft 3 in (1.91 m)	215 lb (98 kg)	Gr	Kimberly HS	Kimberly, WI
44	RHP	Jakob Meyer	R/R	6 ft 2 in (1.88 m)	205 lb (93 kg)	Gr	Columbus North HS	Columbus, IN

Head coach

- Wes Carroll (Evansville)

Assistant coach(es)

- Tyler Shipley (Drury)
- Matt Wollenzin (Austin Peay)

Legend

- (C) Team captain
- (S) Suspended
- (I) Ineligible
- Injured
- Current redshirt

Roster
Last update: June 8, 2024

Note: While listed above as a graduate student for NCAA eligibility purposes, Meyer is a fifth-year senior.

=== Starters ===
Starting Lineup
Pos.	No.	Player	Year
C	0	Brendan Hord	Graduate
1B	11	Chase Hug	Graduate
2B	7	Cal McGinnis	Junior
3B	3	Brent Widder	Graduate
SS	9	Simon Scherry	Senior
LF	32	Mark Shallenberger	Graduate
CF	2	Ty Rumsey	Junior
RF	21	Harrison Taubert	Junior
DH	18	Kip Fougerousse	Junior

Weekend Pitching Rotation
Day	No.	Player	Year
Friday	42	Donovan Schultz	Senior
Saturday	16	Kenton Deverman	Freshman
Sunday	24	Kevin Reed	Freshman

=== Coaching staff ===
2024 Evansville Purple Aces coaching staff
Name	Position	Season at Evansville
Wes Carroll	Head coach	16th
Tyler Shipley	Pitching coach/recruiting coordinator	2nd
Matt Wollenzin	Hitting coach	2nd
Griffin McCormick	Volunteer assistant	1st
Jarrett Blunt	Graduate assistant	1st
Eric Harcourt	Athletic trainer	4th

== Schedule and results ==
2024 Evansville Purple Aces game log: 39–26
Regular season: 31–23
February: 4–4

Date	Site city, state	Rank^{#}	Opponent^{#}	Score	Win	Loss	Save	Overall record	MVC record	Ref.
February 16	J. L. Johnson Stadium; Tulsa, OK		at No. 26 Oral Roberts*	10–12	Ure (1–0)	**Harris** (0–1)	Patten (1)	0–1	0–0	
February 17	J. L. Johnson Stadium; Tulsa, OK		at No. 26 Oral Roberts*	14–3	**Deverman** (1–0)	Fowler (0–1)	—	1–1	0–0	
February 18	J. L. Johnson Stadium; Tulsa, OK		at No. 26 Oral Roberts*	7–6	**Reed** (1–0)	Ruthardt (0–1)	**Meyer** (1)	2–1	0–0	
February 20	Charles H. Braun Stadium; Evansville, IN		vs. Bellarmine*	16–6	**Bell** (1–0)	Irwin (0–1)	—	3–1	0–0	
February 23	Maestri Field at Privateer Park; New Orleans, LA		at New Orleans*	8–10	Tyson-Long (1–0)	**Meyer** (0–1)	Dennis (1)	3–2	0–0	
February 24	Maestri Field at Privateer Park; New Orleans, LA		at New Orleans*	2–3 (10)	Blasick (1–0)	**Meyer** (0–2)	—	3–3	0–0	
February 25	Maestri Field at Privateer Park; New Orleans, LA		at New Orleans*	18–4 (8)	**Harris** (1–1)	Seroski (1–1)	—	4–3	0–0	
February 28	Hawkins Field; Nashville, TN		at No. 13 Vanderbilt*	3–7	Ginther (1–0)	**Harris** (1–2)	—	4–4	0–0	

March: 7–12

Date	Site city, state	Rank^{#}	Opponent^{#}	Score	Win	Loss	Save	Overall record	MVC record	Ref.
March 1	Charles H. Braun Stadium; Evansville, IN		vs. Purdue Fort Wayne*	18–5	**Bell** (2–0)	Ayres (0–2)	—	5–4	0–0	
March 2 (1)	Charles H. Braun Stadium; Evansville, IN		vs. Purdue Fort Wayne*	3–11	Sabol (1–2)	**Smith** (0–1)	—	5–5	0–0	
March 2 (2)	Charles H. Braun Stadium; Evansville, IN		vs. Purdue Fort Wayne*	16–3 (8)	**Deverman** (2–0)	Kuhns (0–2)	—	6–5	0–0	
March 3	Charles H. Braun Stadium; Evansville, IN		vs. Purdue Fort Wayne*	10–9	**Reed** (2–0)	Fine (0–2)	**Hansmann** (1)	7–5	0–0	
March 8	Dudy Noble Field; Starkville, MS		at Mississippi State*	2–5	Dohm (3–0)	**Smith** (0–2)	Auger (2)	7–6	0–0	
March 9	Dudy Noble Field; Starkville, MS		at Mississippi State*	3–8	Stephen (2–1)	**Schultz** (0–1)	—	7–7	0–0	
March 10	Dudy Noble Field; Starkville, MS		at Mississippi State*	3–13 (8)	Cijntje (3–0)	**Deverman** (2–1)	—	7–8	0–0	
March 13	Charles H. Braun Stadium; Evansville, IN		vs. Southeast Missouri State*	6–5 (10)	**Meyer** (1–2)	White (0–1)	—	8–8	0–0	
March 15	McLane Baseball Stadium; East Lansing, MI		at Michigan State*	3–11	Dzierwa (2–1)	**Smith** (0–3)	—	8–9	0–0	
March 16	McLane Baseball Stadium; East Lansing, MI		at Michigan State*	5–3 (11)	**Meyer** (2–2)	Szczepanski (0–2)	—	9–9	0–0	
March 17	McLane Baseball Stadium; East Lansing, MI		at Michigan State*	5–6	Pianto (1–0)	**Harris** (1–3)	Szczepanski (2)	9–10	0–0	
March 19	Kentucky Proud Park; Lexington, KY		at No. 21 Kentucky*	3–11	Cleaver (2–0)	**Bell** (1–2)	—	9–11	0–0	
March 22	Charles H. Braun Stadium; Evansville, IN		vs. Murray State	6–13	Vernon (4–1)	**Smith** (0–4)	—	9–12	0–1	
March 23	Charles H. Braun Stadium; Evansville, IN		vs. Murray State	6–7	Roulette (3–1)	**Harris** (1–4)	Holler (4)	9–13	0–2	
March 24	Charles H. Braun Stadium; Evansville, IN		vs. Murray State	5–6 (10)	McNabb (2–0)	**Meyer** (2–3)	—	9–14	0–3	
March 26	Charles H. Braun Stadium; Evansville, IN		vs. SIU Edwardsville*	6–14	Martin (1–0)	**Meyer** (2–4)	—	9–15	0–3	
March 28	Charles H. Braun Stadium; Evansville, IN		vs. Southern Illinois	12–2 (8)	**Harris** (2–4)	Hansell (3–2)	—	10–15	1–3	
March 29	Charles H. Braun Stadium; Evansville, IN		vs. Southern Illinois	6–10	Dermody (2–0)	**Hansmann** (0–1)	—	10–16	1–4	
March 30	Charles H. Braun Stadium; Evansville, IN		vs. Southern Illinois	11–10 (10)	**Smith** (1–4)	Harper (1–2)	—	11–16	2–4	

April: 14–3

Date	Site city, state	Rank^{#}	Opponent^{#}	Score	Win	Loss	Save	Overall record	MVC record	Ref.
April 2	Charles H. Braun Stadium; Evansville, IN		vs. Austin Peay*	13–6	**Smith** (2–4)	Washington (0–1)	—	12–16	2–4	
April 5	E. S. Rose Park; Nashville, TN		at Belmont	3–2	**Deverman** (3–1)	Pryor (3–2)	**Harris** (1)	13–16	3–4	
April 6	E. S. Rose Park; Nashville, TN		at Belmont	8–3	**Schultz** (1–1)	Baratta (3–2)	—	14–16	4–4	
April 7	E. S. Rose Park; Nashville, TN		at Belmont	0–12 (7)	Ruzicka (3–3)	**Smith** (2–5)	—	14–17	4–5	
April 9	Bulldog Park; Indianapolis, IN		at Butler*	15–5 (7)	**Kressin** (1–0)	Finnigan (0–1)	—	15–17	4–5	
April 12	Charles H. Braun Stadium; Evansville, IN		vs. Illinois State	9–1	**Deverman** (4–1)	Mabee (4–2)	—	16–17	5–5	
April 13	Charles H. Braun Stadium; Evansville, IN		vs. Illinois State	6–5	**Meyer** (3–4)	Husak (2–2)	—	17–17	6–5	
April 14	Charles H. Braun Stadium; Evansville, IN		vs. Illinois State	13–1 (7)	**Harris** (3–4)	Perry (4–4)	—	18–17	7–5	
April 16	Bart Kaufman Field; Bloomington, IN		at Indiana*	5–4	**Reed** (3–0)	Moffitt (1–2)	**Hansmann** (2)	19–17	7–5	
April 19	Dozer Park; Peoria, IL		at Bradley	9–7	**Deverman** (5–1)	Edders (4–5)	**Meyer** (2)	20–17	8–5	
April 20	Dozer Park; Peoria, IL		at Bradley	6–1	**Schultz** (2–1)	Lutz (2–6)	—	21–17	9–5	
April 21	Dozer Park; Peoria, IL		at Bradley	7–2	**Harris** (4–4)	Marks (0–4)	—	22–17	10–5	
April 23	Alexander Field; West Lafayette, IN		at Purdue*	Postponed (rain); Makeup: April 24						
April 24	Alexander Field; West Lafayette, IN		at Purdue*	6–10	Pratt (1–0)	**Reed** (3–1)	—	22–18	10–5	
April 26	Charles H. Braun Stadium; Evansville, IN		vs. Missouri State	4–1	**Deverman** (6–1)	Thompson (5–1)	—	23–18	11–5	
April 27	Charles H. Braun Stadium; Evansville, IN		vs. Missouri State	8–7	**Schultz** (3–1)	Schaaf (2–2)	**Meyer** (3)	24–18	12–5	
April 28	Charles H. Braun Stadium; Evansville, IN		vs. Missouri State	8–19 (7)	Schissler (1–0)	**Harris** (4–5)	—	24–19	12–6	
April 30	Capaha Field; Cape Girardeau, MO		at Southeast Missouri State*	7–6	**Hansmann** (1–1)	Miller (3–2)	—	25–19	12–6	

May: 6–4

Date	Site city, state	Rank^{#}	Opponent^{#}	Score	Win	Loss	Save	Overall record	MVC record	Ref.
May 3	Emory G. Bauer Field; Valparaiso, IN		at Valparaiso	13–1 (7)	**Deverman** (7–1)	Krier (1–6)	—	26–19	13–6	
May 4	Emory G. Bauer Field; Valparaiso, IN		at Valparaiso	4–8	Jablonski (3–1)	**Fieger** (0–1)	Jakubowski (2)	26–20	13–7	
May 5	Emory G. Bauer Field; Valparaiso, IN		at Valparaiso	9–0	**Harris** (5–5)	Konitzer (1–2)	—	27–20	14–7	
May 7	Charles H. Braun Stadium; Evansville, IN		vs. Southern Indiana*	10–0 (7)	**Reed** (4–1)	Weihe (1–3)	—	28–20	14–7	
May 10	Bob Warn Field; Terre Haute, IN		at No. 17 Indiana State	4–5	Pruitt (3–2)	**Harris** (5–6)	—	28–21	14–8	
May 11	Bob Warn Field; Terre Haute, IN		at No. 17 Indiana State	4–6	Davidson (3–1)	**Schultz** (3–2)	Gregersen (6)	28–22	14–9	
May 12	Bob Warn Field; Terre Haute, IN		at No. 17 Indiana State	7–6	**Harris** (6–6)	Hayden (6–2)	**Meyer** (4)	29–22	15–9	
May 14	Raymond C. Hand Park; Clarksville, TN		at Austin Peay*	Cancelled (rain)						
May 16	Charles H. Braun Stadium; Evansville, IN		vs. UIC	4–5 (10)	Millsap (3–0)	**Fieger** (0–2)	Lawler (12)	29–23	15–10	
May 17	Charles H. Braun Stadium; Evansville, IN		vs. UIC	9–3	**Schultz** (4–2)	Hawkins (2–2)	—	30–23	16–10	
May 18	Charles H. Braun Stadium; Evansville, IN		vs. UIC	8–2	**Reed** (5–1)	Hawkins (2–3)	—	31–23	17–10	

Postseason: 8–3
Missouri Valley Conference Tournament: 4–0

Date	Site city, state	Rank^{#}	Opponent^{#}	Score	Win	Loss	Save	Overall record	MVCT record	Ref.
May 22	Charles H. Braun Stadium; Evansville, IN	(3)	vs. (4) Illinois State; First Round	17–6 (7)	**Harris** (7–6)	Donnison (0–3)	—	32–23	1–0	
May 24	Charles H. Braun Stadium; Evansville, IN	(3)	vs. (5) UIC; Second Round	12–1 (7)	**Schultz** (5–2)	Bak (4–3)	—	33–23	2–0	
May 25 (1)	Charles H. Braun Stadium; Evansville, IN	(3)	vs. (4) Illinois State; Semifinals	17–7 (7)	**Harris** (8–6)	Chadwick (3–6)	—	34–23	3–0	
May 25 (2)	Charles H. Braun Stadium; Evansville, IN	(3)	at (1) No. 17 Indiana State; Championship	8–6	**Deverman** (8–1)	Edmonson (5–2)	**Meyer** (5)	35–23	4–0	

NCAA Tournament – Greenville Regional: 3–1

Date	Site city, state	Rank^{#}	Opponent^{#}	Score	Win	Loss	Save	Overall record	NCAAT record	Ref.
May 31	Clark–LeClair Stadium; Greenville, NC	(4)	at (1) No. 13 East Carolina; Regional Quarterfinals	4–1	**Deverman** (9–1)	Root (6–1)	**Harris** (2)	36–23	1–0	
June 1	Clark–LeClair Stadium; Greenville, NC	(4)	at (3) VCU; Regional Semifinals	17–11	**Schultz** (6–2)	Cosentino (3–2)	—	37–23	2–0	
June 2	Clark–LeClair Stadium; Greenville, NC	(4)	vs. (1) No. 13 East Carolina; Regional Final Game 1	6–19	Norby (4–0)	**Reed** (5–2)	—	37–24	2–1	
June 3	Clark–LeClair Stadium; Greenville, NC	(4)	vs. (1) No. 13 East Carolina; Regional Final Game 2	6–5	**Hansmann** (2–1)	Root (6–2)	**Harris** (3)	38–24	3–1	

NCAA Tournament – Knoxville Super Regional: 1–2

Date	Site city, state	Rank^{#}	Opponent^{#}	Score	Win	Loss	Save	Overall record	NCAAT record	Ref.
June 7	Lindsey Nelson Stadium; Knoxville, TN	(4) No. 16	at (1) No. 1 Tennessee; Super Regional Game 1	6–11	Causey (13–3)	**Deverman** (9–2)	—	38–25	3–2	
June 8	Lindsey Nelson Stadium; Knoxville, TN	(4) No. 16	vs. (1) No. 1 Tennessee; Super Regional Game 2	10–8	**Meyer** (4–4)	Connell (4–1)	**Harris** (4)	39–25	4–2	
June 9	Lindsey Nelson Stadium; Knoxville, TN	(4) No. 16	at (1) No. 1 Tennessee; Super Regional Game 3	1–12	Sechrist (2–1)	**Reed** (5–3)	—	39–26	4–3	

Legend: = Win = Loss = Canceled/postponed **Bold** = Evansville team member * Non-conference game

== Statistics ==
=== Record vs. conference opponents ===
Last two do not qualify for the conference tournament. Blank are not scheduled. Blue are home games, otherwise away.

2024 MVC baseball game results Source: 2024 MVC baseball game results
Team	W–L	BEL	BRA	UE	ILSU	INSU	MSU	MUR	SIU	UIC	VAL	Team	Conf	SR	SW
BEL	12–15		2–1	1–2	1–2	0–3	2–1	3–0	0–3	1–2	2–1	BEL	7th	4–5	1–2
BRA	6–21	1–2		0–3	2–1	0–3	1–2	0–3	1–2	0–3	1–2	BRA	10th	1–8	0–4
UE	17–10	2–1	3–0		3–0	1–2	2–1	0–3	2–1	2–1	2–1	UE	3rd	7–2	2–1
ILSU	16–11	2–1	1–2	0–3		1–2	3–0	1–2	3–0	2–1	3–0	ILSU	4th	5–4	3–1
INSU	22–5	3–0	3–0	2–1	2–1		2–1	2–1	2–1	3–0	3–0	INSU	1st	9–0	4–0
MSU	11–16	1–2	2–1	1–2	0–3	1–2		1–2	2–1	1–2	2–1	MSU	8th	3–6	0–1
MUR	17–10	0–3	3–0	3–0	2–1	1–2	2–1		2–1	1–2	3–0	MUR	2nd	6–3	3–1
SIU	12–15	3–0	2–1	1–2	0–3	1–2	1–2	1–2		0–3	3–0	SIU	6th	3–6	2–2
UIC	16–11	2–1	3–0	1–2	1–2	0–3	2–1	2–1	3–0		2–1	UIC	5th	6–3	2–1
VAL	6–21	1–2	2–1	1–2	0–3	0–3	1–2	0–3	0–3	1–2		VAL	9th	1–8	0–4
Team	W–L	BEL	BRA	UE	ILSU	INSU	MSU	MUR	SIU	UIC	VAL	Team	Conf	SR	SW

Updated for entire regular season. Tie Brkrs: MUR>UE head to head. ILSU>UIC head to head. SIU>BEL head to head. VAL>BRA head to head.

=== Batting ===
Player	G	AB	R	H	2B	3B	HR	RBI	SB	CS	BB	SO	AVG	OBP	SLG	OPS
Kip Fougerousse	65	270	71	94	21	1	22	71	1	0	31	75	.348	.428	.678	1.106
Brendan Hord	62	198	51	48	19	0	9	44	0	0	39	63	.242	.378	.475	.853
Drew Howard	14	5	4	0	0	0	0	0	0	1	2	2	.000	.286	.000	.286
Chase Hug	39	126	30	35	11	0	6	31	2	1	35	34	.278	.446	.508	.954
Kevin McCormick	10	8	2	1	0	0	0	1	0	0	3	4	.125	.417	.125	.542
Cal McGinnis	52	198	38	69	14	2	6	39	1	0	16	22	.348	.394	.530	.924
Brodie Peart	40	122	20	33	5	0	2	17	2	2	11	28	.270	.328	.361	.689
Ty Rumsey	61	195	45	55	8	1	7	45	16	2	27	61	.282	.391	.441	.832
Simon Scherry	65	253	57	73	15	0	6	44	16	0	35	35	.289	.376	.419	.795
Mark Shallenberger	65	243	72	91	21	2	17	64	6	4	45	28	.374	.514	.687	1.201
Ben Stuart	6	5	2	2	1	0	0	0	0	0	0	3	.400	.500	.600	1.100
Harrison Taubert	64	240	54	70	21	1	9	49	8	1	30	71	.292	.400	.500	.900
Evan Waggoner	32	70	11	19	2	0	0	9	0	0	16	17	.271	.416	.300	.716
Brent Widder	65	261	46	73	20	0	12	58	2	3	30	50	.280	.384	.494	.878
Kaleb Wilkey	26	46	7	6	1	0	0	5	0	0	6	16	.130	.259	.152	.411
Team totals	65	2,240	510	669	159	7	96	477	54	14	326	509	.299	.406	.504	.910

=== Pitching ===
Player	G	GS	IP	W	L	SV	ERA	H	2B	3B	HR	R	ER	BB	HBP	SO
Ethan Bell	8	0	14.2	2	1	0	3.68	7	2	1	0	6	6	8	3	19
Kenton Deverman	18	16	111.0	9	2	0	4.22	112	20	0	15	55	52	23	5	83
Drew Fieger	27	0	37.2	0	2	0	7.65	44	8	0	4	32	32	26	3	32
Elias Hachem	4	2	3.2	0	0	0	4.91	4	0	0	0	5	2	4	3	3
Max Hansmann	26	0	38.2	2	1	2	6.05	34	3	1	3	28	26	32	1	41
Shane Harris	27	6	75.1	8	6	4	3.82	70	19	0	4	39	32	31	4	72
Jacob Jarvis	3	0	3.0	0	0	0	12.00	4	1	0	0	4	4	3	0	2
Jace Kressin	18	0	19.2	1	0	0	6.41	17	4	0	1	15	14	9	5	22
Parker MacCauley	6	0	6.2	0	0	0	6.75	3	1	0	1	11	5	10	2	4
Jakob Meyer	30	0	46.0	4	4	5	6.07	36	11	1	3	34	31	24	11	50
Kevin Reed	17	15	58.2	5	3	0	7.98	77	13	1	19	56	52	28	6	40
Kellen Roberts	3	0	4.0	0	0	0	13.50	8	1	1	3	6	6	2	1	3
Donovan Schultz	17	17	90.2	6	2	0	6.15	101	28	3	18	64	62	34	5	74
Nick Smith	18	9	42.0	2	5	0	13.07	69	17	2	15	62	61	30	10	42
Team totals	65	65	551.2	39	26	11	6.17	586	128	10	86	418	378	264	59	487

== Awards and honors ==
Evansville Purple Aces

- NCAA Knoxville Super Regional runner-ups
- NCAA Greenville Regional champions
- MVC Tournament champions
- ABCA Team Academic Excellence Award

Wes Carroll

- ABCA/ATEC Midwest Regional Coach Of The Year

Kenton Deverman

- MVC Freshman of the Year
- Baseball America Freshman All-American First Team
- D1Baseball Freshman All-American First Team
- NCBWA Freshman All-American Second Team
- ABCA/Rawlings Midwest All-Region Second Team
- NCAA Greenville Regional All-Tournament Team
- All-MVC First Team

Kip Fougerousse

- NCAA Greenville Regional Most Outstanding Player
- ABCA/Rawlings Midwest All-Region First Team
- MVC All-Tournament Team

Shane Harris

- MVC Pitcher of the Week (May 6)

Brendan Hord

- MVC All-Tournament Team
- MVC Scholar-Athlete Second Team

Cal McGinnis

- MVC Tournament Most Outstanding Player
- MVC Scholar-Athlete Second Team
- MVC Player of the Week (February 19)

Donovan Schultz

- MVC Elite 17 Award
- MVC Scholar-Athlete First Team
- MVC Scholar-Athlete Spotlight (April 25)

Mark Shallenberger

- D1Baseball All-American Second Team
- ABCA/Rawlings All-American Third Team
- ABCA/Rawlings Midwest All-Region First Team
- NCAA Greenville Regional All-Tournament Team
- All-MVC First Team
- MVC Scholar-Athlete First Team
- MVC Player of the Week (April 8 and April 29)

Simon Sherry

- NCAA Greenville Regional All-Tournament Team

Harrison Taubert

- MVC All-Tournament Team

Evan Waggoner

- MVC Board of Directors Academic Excellence Award

== Rankings ==
Ranking movements Legend: ██ Increase in ranking ██ Decrease in ranking — = Not ranked
	Week																	
Poll	Pre	1	2	3	4	5	6	7	8	9	10	11	12	13	14	15	16	Final
Coaches'	—	—*	—	—	—	—	—	—	—	—	—	—	—	—	—	—	—*	23
Baseball America	—	—	—	—	—	—	—	—	—	—	—	—	—	—	—	—	—*	23
NCBWA†	—	—	—	—	—	—	—	—	—	—	—	—	—	—	—	—	16	15
D1Baseball	—	—	—	—	—	—	—	—	—	—	—	—	—	—	—	—	—*	16
Perfect Game	—	—	—	—	—	—	—	—	—	—	—	—	—	—	—	—*	16	11

† NCBWA ranks 30 teams in their preseason poll, but only ranks 25 teams weekly during the season.
* A new poll was not released for this week, so for comparison purposes, the previous week's ranking is inserted in this week's slot.

== 2024 MLB draft ==
Round	Pick	Player	Position	Team
Undrafted		Kip Fougerousse	3B	None
Undrafted		Mark Shallenberger	OF	None
Undrafted		Simon Scherry	SS	None
