= 1988 Evansville Purple Aces baseball team =

American college baseball season

1988 Evansville Purple Aces baseball

MCC South Division champions MCC regular season champions MCC tournament champions

NCAA Tempe Regional, 1–2
- Conference: Midwestern Collegiate Conference
- South Division
- Record: 44–20 (11–1 MCC)
- Head coach: Jim Brownlee (9th season)
- Home stadium: Bosse Field

1988 Midwestern Collegiate Conference baseball standings
	Conf.				Overall
Team	W		L	PCT	W		L	PCT
North Division
Notre Dame ^{x}‍‍‍	9	–	3	.750	39	–	22	.639
Detroit ‍‍‍	8	–	8	.500	31	–	24	.564
Xavier ‍‍‍	5	–	7	.417	19	–	37	.339
Dayton ‍‍‍	2	–	10	.167	20	–	29	.408
South Division
Evansville ^{x}‍†‍‡‍^{y}	11	–	1	.917	44	–	20	.688
Butler ‍‍‍	3	–	5	.375	15	–	26	.366
Saint Louis ‍‍‍	2	–	6	.250	11	–	29	.275
x – Division champion † – Conference champion ‡ – Tournament champion y – Invited to the NCAA Tournament; As of June 30, 1988; Rankings from Collegiate Baseball

The 1988 Evansville Purple Aces baseball team represented the University of Evansville as a member of the Midwestern Collegiate Conference during the 1988 NCAA Division I baseball season. The Purple Aces played their home games at Bosse Field. The team was coached by Jim Brownlee in his ninth season at Evansville.

After going 39–17 (11–1 MCC) in the regular season, Evansville would win the MCC South Division title and the MCC Tournament. After receiving an automatic bid, Evansville reached the NCAA Division I Tournament for the first time since transitioning to Division I in 1977. In the Tempe Regional, Evansville would upset No. 1 Arizona State before losing back-to-back games to UNLV and Central Michigan. Evansville would finish the season with a 44–20 record. As of 2024, 44 wins is still the most in the program's history. They also set team records for shutouts (18), complete games (37), and lowest ERA (2.99).

Following the season, pitcher Andy Benes was selected first overall by the San Diego Padres during the 1988 Major League Baseball draft, marking the first time that an Evansville player was selected in the first round of the MLB draft.

== Roster ==
1988 Evansville Purple Aces roster
Pitchers: 30 Andy Benes; – Jim Burger; – Craig Fischer; – John Schultheis	Catchers Infielders: – Jeff Breivogel; – Kenneth Fields; – Rob Maurer; – Brad Tyler; – John Olson	Outfielders: – John Bauser; – Brad Tyler

== Schedule and results ==
Legend
	Evansville win
	Evansville loss
**Bold**	Evansville team member
*	Non-conference game

1988 Evansville Purple Aces game log: 44–20
Regular season: 39–17
February: 0–1

Date	Site/stadium	Opponent	Score	Overall record	MCC record
February 28	Knights Field • Louisville, KY	at Bellarmine*	**L** 4–5	0–1	0–0

March: 16–6

Date	Site/stadium	Opponent	Score	Overall record	MCC record
March 2	Governors Park • Clarksville, TN	at Austin Peay*	**W** 8–2	1–1	0–0
March 4	Jerry D. Young Memorial Field • Birmingham, AL	at UAB*	**W** 12–7	2–1	0–0
March 5	Jerry D. Young Memorial Field • Birmingham, AL	at UAB*	**W** 5–3	3–1	0–0
March 6	Bosse Field • Evansville, IN	UNC Wilmington*	**W** 3–0	4–1	0–0
March 7	J. I. Clements Stadium • Statesboro, GA	at Georgia Southern*	**W** 5–0	5–1	0–0
March 8	Bosse Field • Evansville, IN	Eastern Michigan*	**L** 4–16	5–2	0–0
March 9	Bosse Field • Evansville, IN	West Virginia*	**L** 1–3	5–3	0–0
March 10	Bosse Field • Evansville, IN	UNC Wilmington*	**W** 6–0	6–3	0–0
March 11	Bosse Field • Evansville, IN	James Madison*	**L** 5–10	6–4	0–0
March 12	Bosse Field • Evansville, IN	West Virginia*	**W** 8–5	7–4	0–0
March 15	McGugin Field • Nashville, TN	at Vanderbilt*	**W** 6–5	8–4	0–0
March 16	McGugin Field • Nashville, TN	at Vanderbilt*	**W** 4–3	9–4	0–0
March 19	Bosse Field • Evansville, IN	Ball State*	**L** 9–10	9–5	0–0
March 19	Bosse Field • Evansville, IN	Ball State*	**W** 3–2	10–5	0–0
March 20	Bosse Field • Evansville, IN	Ball State*	**W** 4–0	11–5	0–0
March 20	Bosse Field • Evansville, IN	Ball State*	**W** 7–0	12–5	0–0
March 22	Sembower Field • Bloomington, IN	at Indiana*	**L** 1–9	12–6	0–0
March 23	Bosse Field • Evansville, IN	Kentucky Wesleyan*	**W** 5–2	13–6	0–0
March 26	Bosse Field • Evansville, IN	Miami (OH)*	**W** 5–2	14–6	0–0
March 26	Bosse Field • Evansville, IN	Miami (OH)*	**W** 5–3	15–6	0–0
March 27	Bosse Field • Evansville, IN	Miami (OH)*	**L** 3–8	15–7	0–0
March 27	Bosse Field • Evansville, IN	Miami (OH)*	**W** 4–3	16–7	0–0

April: 15–8

Date	Site/stadium	Opponent	Score	Overall record	MCC record
April 5	Abe Martin Field • Carbondale, IL	at Southern Illinois*	**L** 3–4	16–8	0–0
April 5	Abe Martin Field • Carbondale, IL	at Southern Illinois*	**W** 9–5	17–8	0–0
April 9	Bosse Field • Evansville, IN	Eastern Illinois*	**W** 2–0	18–8	0–0
April 9	Bosse Field • Evansville, IN	Eastern Illinois*	**W** 4–0	19–8	0–0
April 10	Monier Field • Charleston, IL	at Eastern Illinois*	**W** 11–3	20–8	0–0
April 10	Monier Field • Charleston, IL	at Eastern Illinois*	**W** 8–0	21–8	0–0
April 12	Bosse Field • Evansville, IN	Southern Illinois*	**L** 3–7	21–9	0–0
April 12	Bosse Field • Evansville, IN	Southern Illinois*	**L** 1–4	21–10	0–0
April 13	Turkey Hughes Field • Richmond, KY	at Eastern Kentucky*	**W** 6–0	22–10	0–0
April 13	Turkey Hughes Field • Richmond, KY	at Eastern Kentucky*	**L** 4–5	22–11	0–0
April 14	Bosse Field • Evansville, IN	Louisville*	**W** 7–6	23–11	0–0
April 16	Musial Field • St. Louis, MO	at Saint Louis	**W** 5–1	24–11	1–0
April 16	Musial Field • St. Louis, MO	at Saint Louis	**W** 16–1	25–11	2–0
April 17	Bosse Field • Evansville, IN	Saint Louis	**W** 8–6	26–11	3–0
April 17	Bosse Field • Evansville, IN	Saint Louis	**L** 8–10	26–12	3–1
April 19	Bosse Field • Evansville, IN	Indiana State*	**L** 3–8	26–13	3–1
April 23	Nat Buring Stadium • Memphis, TN	at Memphis*	**W** 4–2	27–13	3–1
April 23	Nat Buring Stadium • Memphis, TN	at Memphis*	**L** 6–7	27–14	3–1
April 24	Nat Buring Stadium • Memphis, TN	at Memphis*	**W** 7–3	28–14	3–1
April 26	Nick Denes Field • Bowling Green, KY	at Western Kentucky*	**L** 4–5	28–15	3–1
April 27	Bosse Field • Evansville, IN	Western Kentucky*	**W** 18–3	29–15	3–1
April 30	Bosse Field • Evansville, IN	Butler	**W** 15–1	30–15	4–1
April 30	Bosse Field • Evansville, IN	Butler	**W** 10–2	31–15	5–1

May: 8–2

Date	Site/stadium	Opponent	Score	Overall record	MCC record
May 1	Bosse Field • Evansville, IN	Butler	**W** 15–4	32–15	6–1
May 1	Bosse Field • Evansville, IN	Butler	**W** 10–3	33–15	7–1
May 6	Bosse Field • Evansville, IN	Southern Indiana*	**W** 3–0	34–15	7–1
May 10	Sycamore Field • Terre Haute, IN	at Indiana State*	**L** 5–12	34–16	7–1
May 11	Lambert Field • West Lafayette, IN	at Purdue*	**L** 3–6	34–17	7–1
May 12	Lambert Field • West Lafayette, IN	at Purdue*	**W** 7–0	35–17	7–1
May 14	Bosse Field • Evansville, IN	Xavier	**W** 1–0	36–17	8–1
May 14	Bosse Field • Evansville, IN	Xavier	**W** 5–0	37–17	9–1
May 15	Bosse Field • Evansville, IN	Xavier	**W** 4–0	38–17	10–1
May 15	Bosse Field • Evansville, IN	Xavier	**W** 8–0	39–17	11–1

Postseason: 5–3
MCC Tournament: 4–1

Date	Site/stadium	Rank^{#}	Opponent^{#}	Score	Overall record	MCCT record
May 20	Stanley Coveleski Regional Stadium • South Bend, IN	(1 S)	vs. (2 N) Detroit	**L** 6–7	39–18	0–1
May 21	Stanley Coveleski Regional Stadium • South Bend, IN	(1 S)	vs. (2 S) Butler	**W** 12–0	40–18	1–1
May 21	Stanley Coveleski Regional Stadium • South Bend, IN	(1 S)	at (1 N) Notre Dame	**W** 9–6	41–18	2–1
May 22	Stanley Coveleski Regional Stadium • South Bend, IN	(1 S)	vs. (2 N) Detroit	**W** 7–0	42–18	3–1
May 22	Stanley Coveleski Regional Stadium • South Bend, IN	(1 S)	vs. (2 N) Detroit	**W** 9–4	43–18	4–1

NCAA Tournament – Tempe Regional: 1–2

Date	Site/stadium	Rank^{#}	Opponent^{#}	Score	Overall record	NCAAT record
May 26	Packard Stadium • Tempe, AZ	(6)	at (1) Arizona State	**W** 1–0	44–18	1–0
May 28	Packard Stadium • Tempe, AZ	(6)	vs. (4) UNLV	**L** 1–2	44–19	1–1
May 28	Packard Stadium • Tempe, AZ	(6)	vs. (3) Central Michigan	**L** 6–7	44–20	1–2

== Awards and honors ==
John Bauser

- MCC All-Tournament Team

Andy Benes

- Rotary Smith Award
- Collegiate Baseball Player of the Year
- MCC Player of the Year
- ABCA All-American First Team
- Baseball America All-American First Team
- Collegiate Baseball All-American First Team
- All-MCC First Team
- MCC All-Tournament Team
- MCC Player of the Week (April 26 and May 24)

Jeff Breivogel

- MCC All-Tournament Team

Jim Brownlee

- MCC Coach of the Year

Jim Burger

- All-MCC Second Team

Kenny Fields

- All-MCC Second Team

Craig Fischer

- MCC All-Tournament Team

John Olson

- All-MCC Second Team

Rob Maurer

- All-MCC Second Team
- MCC All-Tournament Team

John Schultheis

- All-MCC Second Team

Brad Tyler

- MCC Tournament Most Valuable Player

== 1988 MLB draft ==
Round	Pick	Player	Position	Team
1	1	Andy Benes	RHP	San Diego Padres
6	141	Rob Maurer	1B	Texas Rangers
