= 1988 Midwestern Collegiate Conference baseball tournament =

- Teams: 4
- Format: Double-elimination
- Finals site: Stanley Coveleski Regional Stadium; South Bend, Indiana
- Champions: Evansville (1st title)
- Winning coach: Jim Brownlee (1st title)

1988 Midwestern Collegiate Conference baseball standings
| | Conf. | | | | Overall |
| Team | W | | L | PCT | W | | L | PCT |
|---|---|---|---|---|---|---|---|---|
North Division
| Notre Dame ^{x}‍‍‍ | 9 | – | 3 | .750 | 39 | – | 22 | .639 |
| Detroit ‍‍‍ | 8 | – | 8 | .500 | 31 | – | 24 | .564 |
| Xavier ‍‍‍ | 5 | – | 7 | .417 | 19 | – | 37 | .339 |
| Dayton ‍‍‍ | 2 | – | 10 | .167 | 20 | – | 29 | .408 |
South Division
| Evansville ^{x}‍†‍‡‍^{y} | 11 | – | 1 | .917 | 44 | – | 20 | .688 |
| Butler ‍‍‍ | 3 | – | 5 | .375 | 15 | – | 26 | .366 |
| Saint Louis ‍‍‍ | 2 | – | 6 | .250 | 11 | – | 29 | .275 |
x – Division champion † – Conference champion ‡ – Tournament champion y – Invited to the NCAA Tournament; As of June 30, 1988; Rankings from Collegiate Baseball

The 1988 Midwestern Collegiate Conference baseball tournament took place in May 1988, near the close of the 1988 NCAA Division I baseball season. The top two teams from each of the league's two divisions met in the double-elimination tournament held at Stanley Coveleski Regional Stadium home stadium of Notre Dame in South Bend, Indiana. South Division champion Evansville won their first league championship. They Purple Aces fell in the play-in round leading up to the 1988 NCAA Division I baseball tournament.

== Seeding and format ==
The top two finishers from each of the league's two divisions qualified for the tournament, using conference games only. The North Division winner played the runner-up in the South Division and vice versa in the first round.

| Team | W | L | PCT | GB | Seed |
|---|---|---|---|---|---|
North
| Notre Dame | 9 | 3 | .750 | — | 1N |
| Detroit | 8 | 8 | .500 | 3 | 2N |
| Xavier | 5 | 7 | .417 | 4 | — |
| Dayton | 2 | 10 | .167 | 7 | — |

| Team | W | L | Pct. | GB | Seed |
|---|---|---|---|---|---|
South
| Evansville | 11 | 1 | .917 | — | 1S |
| Butler | 3 | 5 | .375 | 6 | 2S |
| Saint Louis | 2 | 6 | .250 | 7 | — |

== Bracket and results ==
First round
1N | Notre Dame | 11
2S | Butler | 6
Winner's bracket
1S | Evansville | 6
2N | Detroit | 7
2S | Butler | 0
1S | Evansville | 12
Loser's bracket

Semi-finals
1N | Notre Dame | 4
2N | Detroit | 5
1N | Notre Dame | 6
1S | Evansville | 9

Finals
2N | Detroit | 0 | 4
1S | Evansville | 7 | 9
