= Evansville Purple Aces baseball =

Missouri Valley NCAA Division I baseball team

- 2026 Evansville Purple Aces baseball team
- Founded: 1924; 102 years ago
- Overall record: 1,565–1,509–12
- University: University of Evansville
- Head coach: Wes Carroll (18th season)
- Conference: Missouri Valley
- Location: Evansville, Indiana
- Home stadium: Charles H. Braun Stadium (Capacity: 1,200)
- Nickname: Purple Aces
- Colors: Purple, white, and orange

NCAA regional champions
- 2024

NCAA tournament appearances
- 1975, 1976, 1988, 2000, 2006, 2024

Conference tournament champions
- 1988, 1990, 2006, 2024

Conference regular season champions
- 1951, 1975, 1976, 1988, 1990, 1991, 2006, 2014

Conference division regular season champions
- 1988, 1989, 1990

The Evansville Purple Aces baseball team represents the University of Evansville in NCAA Division I college baseball. The Purple Aces have competed in the Missouri Valley Conference since 1995. The Purple Aces play all home games on German American Bank Field at Charles H. Braun Stadium. The team competed in two NCAA Division II baseball tournaments before they started competing in Division I in 1995. Since then they have competed in four NCAA Division I baseball tournaments and have won one regional championship.

== History ==
=== Conference history ===
- Independent (1924–1926; 1946–1950)
- Indiana Collegiate Conference (1951–1978)
- Independent (1979–1980)
- Midwestern City / Midwestern Collegiate Conference (1981–1994)
  - South Division (1981–1990)
- Missouri Valley Conference (1995–present)

=== 1924–26: Harmon era ===
The first officially sanctioned Evansville College baseball team was formed in 1924. John Harmon was hired as the first head coach of the then-Evansville College Pioneers. Their first game was against Bethel College, which led to a 5–4 Pioneers victory, marking their first in school history. The Pioneers would finish their inaugural season with a 3–6 record. Harmon would lead the Pioneers to a 5–2 record the following season, their first winning season in school history. In 1926, the "Pioneers" nickname was switched to the "Aces" with popular support. During the same year, the team regressed to 4–10. This was also the last season before the college discontinued the program.

=== 1946: Henke era ===
In 1946, Emerson Henke was hired as the head coach to reconstruct the Purple Aces baseball program. In their return season, Henke led the team to a 0–5 record before being fired at the end of the year. Henke is the only Evansville coach to be fired after not winning a game and owns the title for shortest-tenured coach in school history.

=== 1947–66: Ping era ===
Before the 1947 season, Evansville football coach Don Ping was hired as the Purple Aces baseball coach. In his first season with the team, the Aces went 3–4 before improving to 7–4–1 in 1948. After finishing 5–6–1 in 1949 and 6–5 in 1950, Evansville joined the Indiana Collegiate Conference (ICC) before the start of the 1951 season. Evansville finished their first ICC season with a 7–4–1 winning their first regular season conference championship. Ping would coach the Aces baseball team for another 15 seasons without any postseason success. He compiled a 93–119–5 record and became the first Aces head coach to reach the 90-win mark.

=== 1967–69: Daviess era ===
In 1967, Dave Daviess was hired as the new baseball coach to replace Ping. In his first season, the Aces compiled a 3–8 record while playing some low-level non-conference opponents. The following season, Daviess' group regressed to 4–9 but played slightly better than the previous years. In 1969, the Aces finished with a 9–7–1 which was their best finish since they went 12–3–1 in 1956. Daviess stepped down from being the baseball coach before the 1970 season. He compiled a 16–24–1 record in three seasons with the team.

=== 1970–74: Boultinghouse era ===
Wayne Boultinghouse was hired as the head baseball coach before the 1970 season. He would help the Aces to a 7–7 record in his first year but the team would regress to 3–12 the next year. In 1972, the Aces would finally play their first full schedule of games as they finished with a 14–15–2 record while playing 12 series against high-ranking opponents. In 1974, the Aces would finish with a program-best 35–21 record. After the season, Boultinghouse would step down from his position after compiling an 80–66–2 record in five years.

=== 1975–76: Hodges era ===
In 1975, Bob Hodges was hired as the head baseball coach. His first season would prove to be more than successful. He led the team to a 17–12 regular season record, helping the Aces win their first ICC regular season championship in 24 years. For this, the Aces got an automatic berth to the 1975 NCAA Division II Mideast Regional. After losing to SIU Edwardsville and Wright State, the Aces were eliminated with a 17–14 record. The Aces would continue to be successful the next year, earning another ICC regular season championship while earning a spot in the 1976 NCAA Division II Mideast Regional. The Aces would go 0–2 in the tournament losing to Wright State again and Eastern Illinois. The Aces ended the year with a 21–16 record. After two years with the team and a 38–30 record, Hodges stepped down from his coaching position.

=== 1977–78: Platt era ===
In 1977, Mike Platt was hired to be the newest baseball coach for the Purple Aces. In his first season, he helped the Aces to a 22–18 record before going 13–29 the following season. Platt was fired following the 1978 season. In two years he went 35–47 as the head coach.

=== 1979: Crum era ===
Gary Crum was hired as the next head coach of the Purple Aces in 1979. After going 4–27, Crum was fired.

=== 1980–02: Brownlee era ===
In 1980, Evansville made a risky decision by hiring former Illinois State baseball player Jim Brownlee as their next head coach. Brownlee had previously been the head baseball coach of Princeton Community High School in Princeton, Indiana and had little college coaching experience. This was evident after Evansville finished with a 7–37–1 in his first season.

Before the 1981 season, Evansville joined the Midwestern City Conference (MCC) – now known as the Horizon League – in hopes of better competition. Evansville struggled in the conference until 1985 when they went 38–26 overall and 7–5 in the conference. Brownlee was named MCC Coach of the Year and Pat Heck won MCC Player of the Year, marking the first time in school history that a coach or player won such awards.

Evansville won the MCC regular season divisional and conference championship during the 1988 season after compiling an 11–1 record in conference play. After losing in the first round of the MCC Tournament, Evansville fought to beat Detroit Mercy twice to win the tournament. Brad Tyler was named MCC Tournament Most Valuable Player. They were then given an automatic berth to the 1988 NCAA Division I Tempe Regional. Evansville would upset the eventual College World Series runner-ups in No. 1 Arizona State in the first round but would lose back-to-back games against No. 4 UNLV and No. 3 Central Michigan to be eliminated. Pitcher Andy Benes became the first Aces player to be named Consensus All-American while also being awarded MCC Player of the Year, Baseball America Pitcher of the Year, Collegiate Baseball Player of the Year, and was named the inaugural Rotary Smith Award recipient. Brownlee was also named MCC Coach of the Year. Evansville finished the season with a program-best 44–20 record, a school record that still stands as of 2024.

== Championships ==
=== Conference tournament championships ===
| Season | Conference | Coach | Opponent | Score(s) |
|---|---|---|---|---|
| 1988 | MCC | Jim Brownlee | Detroit Mercy | 7–0, 9–4 |
| 1990 | MCC | Jim Brownlee | Notre Dame | 8–7 |
| 2006 | MVC | Dave Schrage | Missouri State | 8–4, 2–1 |
| 2024 | MVC | Wes Carroll | Indiana State | 8–6 |
Conference Tournament Championships: 4

=== Conference regular season championships ===
| Season | Conference | Coach | Overall | Conference |
|---|---|---|---|---|
| 1951 | ICC | Don Ping | 7–9 | 6–2 |
| 1975 | ICC | Bob Hodges | 17–14 | 10–2 |
| 1976 | ICC | Bob Hodges | 21–16 | 10–2 |
| 1988 | MCC | Jim Brownlee | 44–20 | 11–1 |
| 1990 | MCC | Jim Brownlee | 27–25 | 11–3 |
| 1991 | MCC | Jim Brownlee | 40–18–1 | 19–5 |
| 2006 | MVC | Dave Schrage | 43–22 | 16–8 |
| 2014 | MVC | Wes Carroll | 34–21 | 15–6 |
Conference Regular Season Championships: 8

=== Division regular season championships ===
| Season | Division | Coach | Overall | Conference |
|---|---|---|---|---|
| 1988 | MCC South | Jim Brownlee | 44–20 | 11–1 |
| 1989 | MCC South | Jim Brownlee | 30–26 | 12–3 |
| 1990 | MCC South | Jim Brownlee | 27–25 | 11–3 |
Division Regular Season Championships: 3

== All-time records ==
=== Head coaches ===
| Tenure | Coach | Seasons | Record | Pct. |
|---|---|---|---|---|
| 1924–1926 | John Harmon | 3 | 12–18 | .400 |
| 1946 | Emerson Henke | 1 | 0–5 | .000 |
| 1947–1966 | Don Ping | 21 | 93–119–5 | .440 |
| 1967–1969 | Dave Daviess | 3 | 16–24–1 | .402 |
| 1970–1974 | Wayne Boultinghouse | 5 | 80–66–3 | .547 |
| 1975–1976 | Bob Hodges | 2 | 38–30 | .559 |
| 1977–1978 | Mike Platt | 2 | 35–47 | .427 |
| 1979 | Gary Crum | 1 | 4–27 | .129 |
| 1980–2002 | Jim Brownlee | 23 | 680–565–4 | .546 |
| 2003–2006 | Dave Schrage | 4 | 130–108 | .546 |
| 2007–2008 | David Seifert | 2 | 49–65 | .430 |
| 2009–present | Wes Carroll | 16 | 428–434 | .497 |

=== NCAA tournament ===
| Year | Record | Pct. | Notes |
|---|---|---|---|
| 1975 | 0–2 | .000 | Mideast Regional |
| 1976 | 0–2 | .000 | Mideast Regional |
| 1988 | 1–2 | .333 | Tempe Regional |
| 2000 | 1–2 | .333 | Tallahassee Regional |
| 2006 | 4–2 | .667 | Charlottesville Regional |
| 2024 | 4–3 | .571 | Knoxville Super Regional |

== Players and coaches ==
=== National awards ===
- Collegiate Baseball Player of the Year

Andy Benes – 1988

- Baseball America Pitcher of the Year

Andy Benes – 1988

- Rotary Smith Award

Andy Benes – 1988

- Academic All-American of the Year

Aaron Gries – 1993

- NCAA Regional Tournament MOP

Kip Fougerousse – 2024

- ABCA/ATEC Regional Coach of the Year

Wes Carroll – 2024

=== Conference awards ===
- MCC Player of the Year

Pat Heck – 1985
Andy Benes – 1988
John MacCauley – 1991
Pat Schulz – 1992

- MCC Coach of the Year

Jim Brownlee – 1985, 1988, 1991

- MCC Coleman Award

Pat Heck – 1985
Aaron Gries – 1993
Willie Glen – 2001

- MCC Tournament MVP

Brad Tyler – 1988
Jeff Breivogel – 1990

- MVC Coach of the Year

Jim Brownlee – 2000
Dave Schrage – 2006
Wes Carroll – 2014, 2022

- MVC Pitcher of the Year

Ryan Smith – 2000
Kyle Freeland – 2014
Nick Smith – 2022

- MVC Newcomer of the Year

Cody Strait – 2004
Ben Norton – 2006

- MVC Tournament MOP

Kasey Wahl – 2006
Cal McGinnis – 2024

- MVC Freshman of the Year

Eric Stamets – 2010
Kenton Deverman – 2024

- MVC Defensive Player of the Year

Eric Stamets – 2012

- MVC Player of the Year

Kevin Kaczmarski – 2015

=== Team awards ===
- ABCA Team Academic Excellence Award

Evansville Purple Aces – 2016, 2022, 2023, 2024

=== Retired numbers ===
| No. | Member | Position | Career |
|---|---|---|---|
| 6 | Jim Brownlee | Head coach | 1980–2002 |
| 23 | Jamey Carroll | Infielder | 1994–1996 |
| 30 | Andy Benes | Pitcher | 1986-1988 |

=== No-hitters thrown ===
| No. | Date | Pitcher | Opponent | RS | RA | Notes |
|---|---|---|---|---|---|---|
| 1 | April 7, 1990 | Gerry Croarkin (7 IP) | Butler | 4 | 1 | |
| 2 | May 13, 2000 | Vince Serafini (7 IP) | Missouri State | 3 | 0 | |
| 3 | April 10, 2005 | Fred Jones (7 IP) | Northern Iowa | 10 | 0 | |
| 4 | May 2, 2009 | Keegan Dennis (7 IP) | SIU Edwardsville | 9 | 0 | |

== Facilities ==
=== Bosse Field ===
Bosse Field is a baseball stadium in Evansville, Indiana. It was the home of the University of Evansville Purple Aces baseball team from 1985 to 1998.

=== Charles H. Braun Stadium ===
German American Bank Field at Charles H. Braun Stadium is a baseball stadium in Evansville, Indiana. It has been the home stadium of the University of Evansville Purple Aces baseball team since 1999. In 2020, the field was named after the German American Bank due to its contributions to the 2019 renovations.

== Aces in the MLB ==
| Year | Player | Rnd. | No. | Team |
|---|---|---|---|---|
| 1984 | Mike Goedde | 4 | 82 | Cincinnati Reds |
| 1987 | Darren Niethammer | 16 | 415 | Texas Rangers |
| 1988 | Andy Benes | 1 | 1 | San Diego Padres |
| 1988 | Rob Maurer | 6 | 141 | Texas Rangers |
| 1990 | Brad Tyler | 6 | 175 | Baltimore Orioles |
| 1991 | John MacCauley | 35 | 930 | Chicago White Sox |
| 1992 | Jeff Tenbarge | 6 | 153 | Houston Astros |
| 1993 | Curtis Broome | 22 | 621 | Chicago White Sox |
| 1993 | Sal Fasano | 37 | 1,029 | Kansas City Royals |
| 1993 | Greg Willming | 42 | 1,179 | Texas Rangers |
| 1994 | Chris Helfrich | 36 | 989 | Oakland Athletics |
| 1995 | Adam Benes | 20 | 547 | St. Louis Cardinals |
| 1995 | Jason Imrisek | 43 | 1,206 | New York Yankees |
| 1996 | Jamey Carroll | 14 | 400 | Montreal Expos |
| 1996 | Mike Zywica | 24 | 713 | Texas Rangers |
| 1997 | Chris Luttig | 17 | 512 | Pittsburgh Pirates |
| 1998 | Brian McMillin | 31 | 919 | Minnesota Twins |
| 1999 | John Kremer | 19 | 591 | New York Yankees |
| 2000 | Ryan Miller | 9 | 261 | Milwaukee Brewers |
| 2001 | Preston Larrison | 2 | 55 | Detroit Tigers |
| 2001 | Vince Serafini | 6 | 167 | Minnesota Twins |
| 2001 | Wes Carroll | 37 | 1,100 | Philadelphia Phillies |
| 2001 | Matt Serafini | 43 | 1,284 | Milwaukee Brewers |
| 2002 | Steve Obenchain | 1^{S} | 37 | Oakland Athletics |
| 2002 | Blake Whealy | 13 | 387 | New York Mets |
| 2002 | Andy Rohleder | 24 | 713 | Florida Marlins |
| 2002 | Joey Vandever | 43 | 1,301 | St. Louis Cardinals |
| 2004 | Cody Strait | 12 | 348 | Cincinnati Reds |
| 2005 | Erik Lis | 9 | 285 | Minnesota Twins |
| 2005 | Michael Greenhouse | 28 | 850 | Chicago Cubs |
| 2006 | Adam Rogers | 31 | 930 | Toronto Blue Jays |
| 2007 | Ben Norton | 24 | 726 | Kansas City Royals |
| 2007 | Kirk Bacsu | 32 | 982 | Philadelphia Philies |
| 2007 | Fred Jones | 33 | 1,021 | New York Yankees |
| 2007 | Kai Tuomi | 40 | 1,197 | Washington Nationals |
| 2009 | Wade Kapteyn | 24 | 720 | Detroit Tigers |
| 2011 | Cody Fick | 23 | 721 | Philadelphia Phillies |
| 2012 | Eric Stamets | 6 | 207 | Los Angeles Angels |
| 2013 | Kyle Lloyd | 29 | 868 | San Diego Padres |
| 2014 | Kyle Freeland | 1 | 8 | Colorado Rockies |
| 2014 | Kyle Pollock | 20 | 603 | Kansas City Royals |
| 2014 | Sam Johns | 31 | 934 | Washington Nationals |

== See also ==
- List of NCAA Division I baseball programs
