= Stamets =

Stamets is a surname. Notable people with the surname include:

- Andy Stamets (born 1973), American guitarist
- Eric Stamets (born 1991), American baseball player
- Paul Stamets (born 1955), American mycologist and entrepreneur

== Fictional ==
- Paul Stamets (Star Trek), portrayed by actor Anthony Rapp.
