= List of Athletics first-round draft picks =

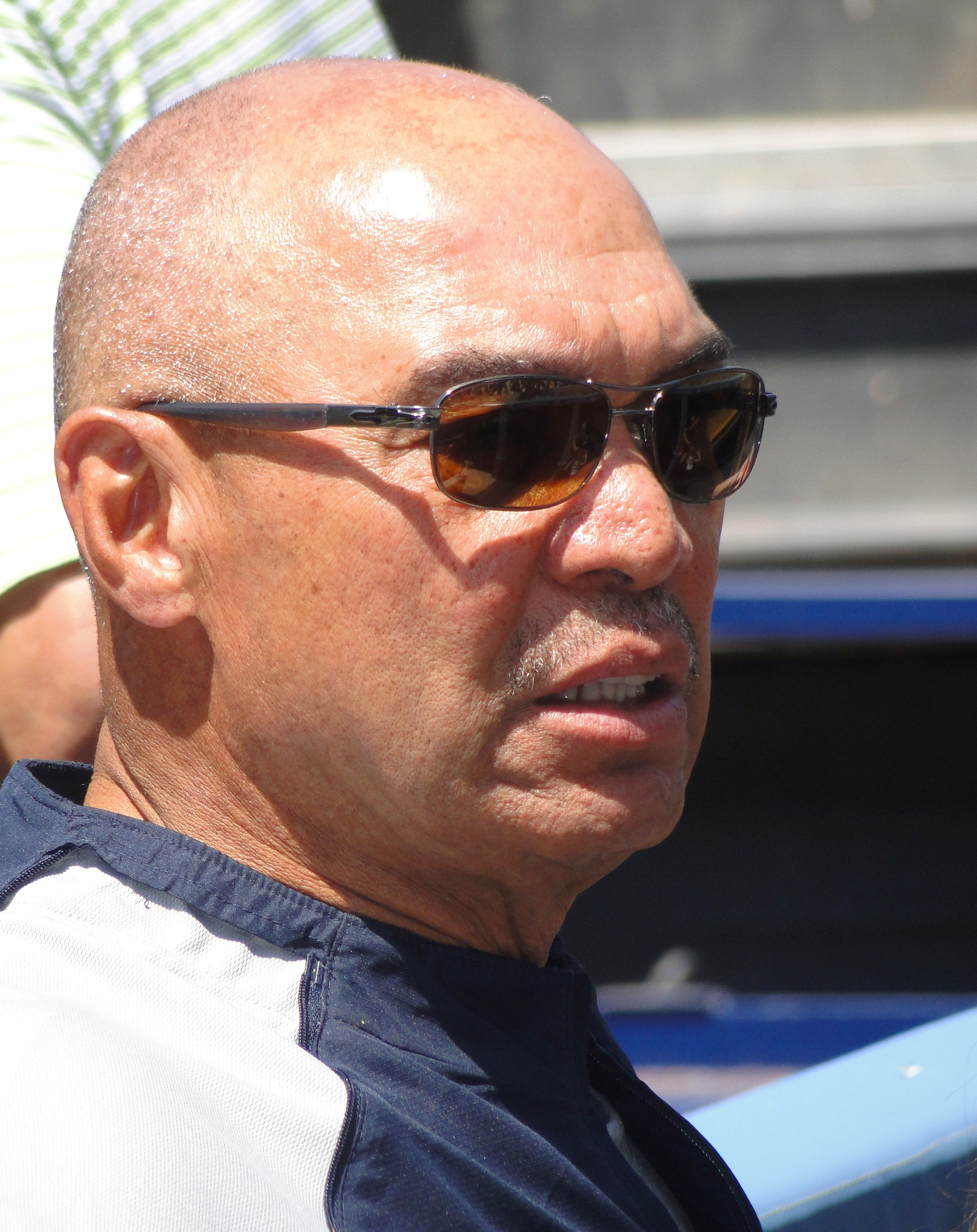
Reggie Jackson (1966) won three World Series titles with the A's and was elected to the Baseball Hall of Fame in 1993.

The Athletics (the A's) are a Major League Baseball (MLB) franchise based in West Sacramento, California. They play in the American League West division. The Athletics had previously played in Philadelphia from 1901 to 1954, Kansas City from 1955 to 1967, and Oakland, California from 1968 to 2024. Since the establishment of the Rule 4 Draft the Athletics have selected 82 players in the first round. Officially known as the "First-Year Player Draft", the Rule 4 Draft is MLB's primary mechanism for assigning players from high schools, colleges, and other amateur clubs to its franchises. The draft order is determined based on the previous season's standings, with the team possessing the worst record receiving the first pick. In addition, teams which lost free agents in the previous off-season may be awarded compensatory or supplementary picks.

Of these 82 players, 36 have been pitchers, the most of any position; 27 of these were right-handed, while 9 were left-handed. Fifteen outfielders, including one center fielder, and 14 shortstops were selected. The A's have also drafted seven catchers, five third basemen, four first basemen, and one second baseman in the first round. Additionally, 23 players came from high schools or universities in the A's home state of California, followed by 10 from Texas and Florida. They also drafted Ariel Prieto in 1995, who had defected from Cuba the year before. Prieto made his major league debut in 1995, one of 20 players in draft history to go directly to the majors without playing in the minor leagues.

Three Athletics' first-round picks have won championships with the franchise. Reggie Jackson (1966) won World Series titles with the team in 1972, 1973, and 1974. Mark McGwire (1984) and Walt Weiss (1985) won with the 1989 championship team. Five A's first-round picks have gone on to win the Rookie of the Year Award: McGwire in 1987, Weiss in 1988, Ben Grieve (1994) in 1998, Huston Street (2004) in 2005, and Nick Kurtz (2024) in 2025. Jackson also won a Most Valuable Player award in 1973, and Barry Zito (1999) won a Cy Young Award in 2002, making them the A's only picks to win these awards. Reggie Jackson, elected in 1993, is their only pick in the Baseball Hall of Fame. Although eligible McGwire has not been elected despite over 500 career home runs and briefly holding the single-season home run record (70). Some see McGwire's exclusion as a sign that the Hall is hesitant to elect players suspected of using performance-enhancing drugs as McGwire was suspected of steroid use (he later admitted his use in 2010). The Athletics have made nineteen selections in the supplemental round of the draft and have made the first overall selection once: in the first draft in 1965.

The Athletics have failed to sign three first-round draft picks, although they did not receive a compensation pick for any of them. The first such player not signed was Pete Broberg in 1968. The A's also failed to sign both of their draft picks in 1979, Juan Bustabad and Mike Stenhouse. The Athletics have had ten compensatory picks overall since the first draft in 1965. These additional picks are provided when a team loses a particularly valuable free agent in the previous off-season,^{[V]} or, more recently, if a team fails to sign a draft pick from the previous year.

== Key ==
Year	Each year links to an article about that year's Major League Baseball draft.
Position	Indicates the secondary/collegiate position at which the player was drafted, rather than the professional position the player may have gone on to play
Pick	Indicates the number of the pick
*	Player did not sign with the Athletics
§	Indicates a supplemental pick
†	Member of the National Baseball Hall of Fame and Museum
'72, '73, '74	Player was a member of the Athletics' 1972, 1973, and 1974 championship teams
'89	Player was a member of the Athletics' 1989 championship team

== Picks ==
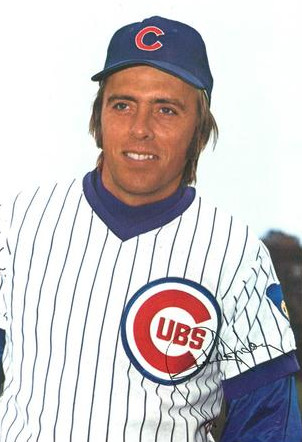
Rick Monday (1965) was the first pick of the first draft in league history.

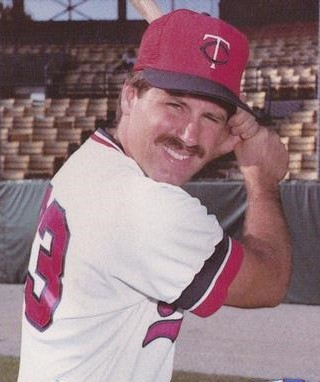
Mike Stenhouse was the final pick of the first round of the 1979 draft and one of two first-round picks who did not sign with the Athletics that year.

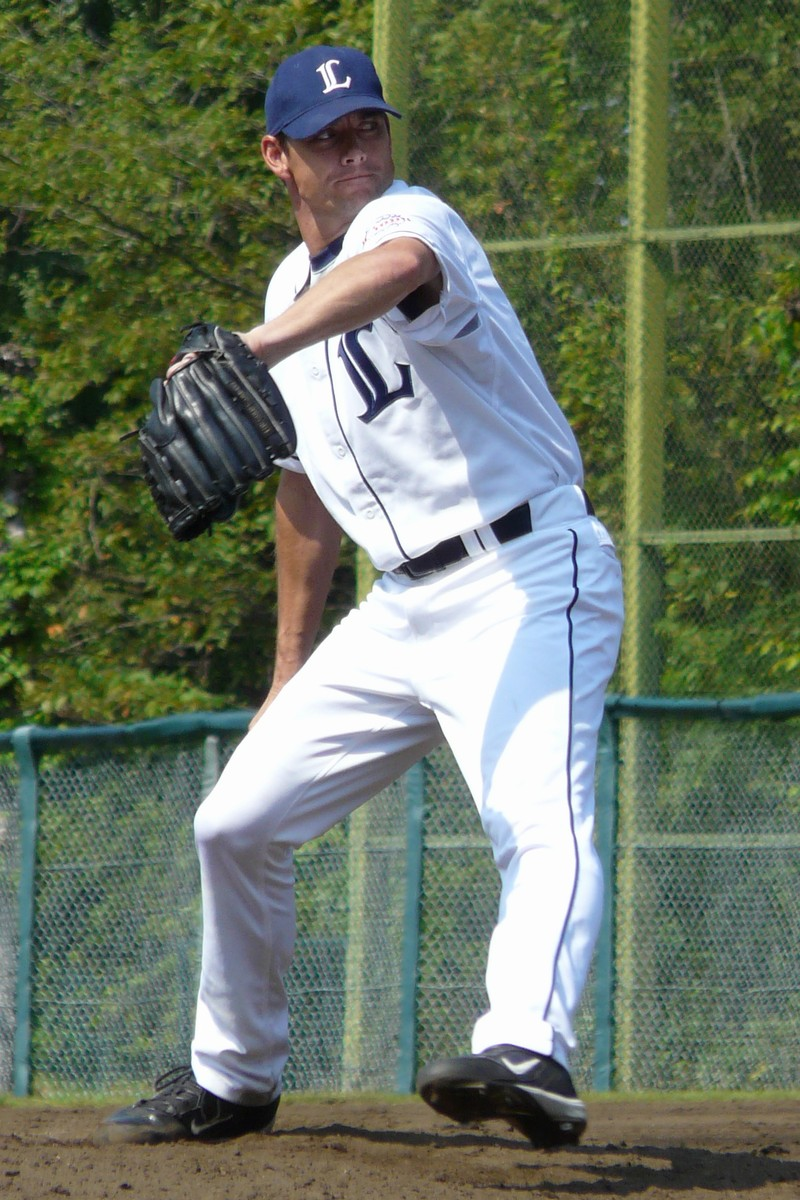
John Wasdin (1993) is one of six players taken by the A's from the state of Florida.

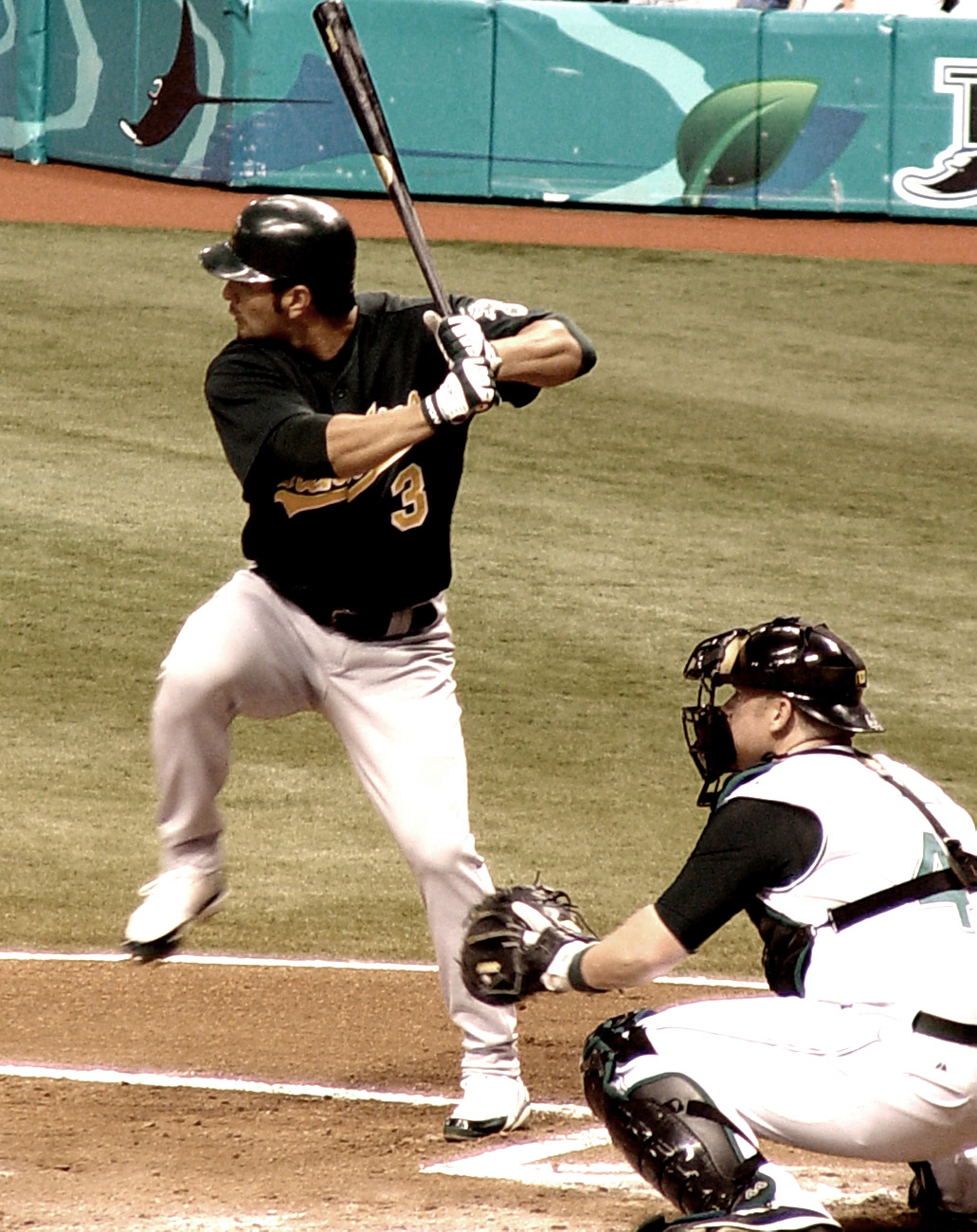
Eric Chavez (1996) won six Rawlings Gold Glove Awards while with Oakland.

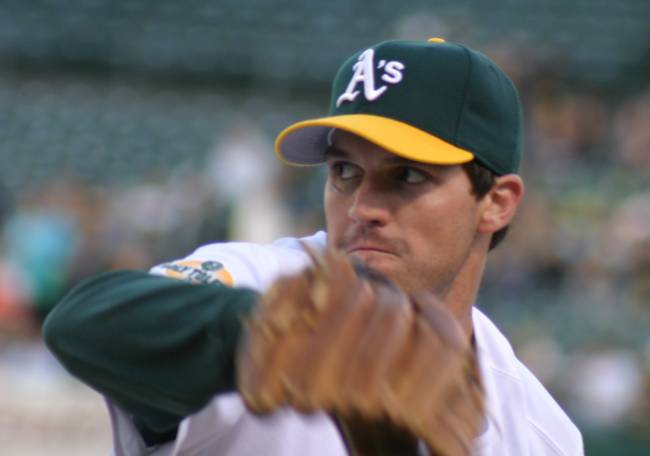
Barry Zito (1999) won a Cy Young Award while with the Athletics in 2002.

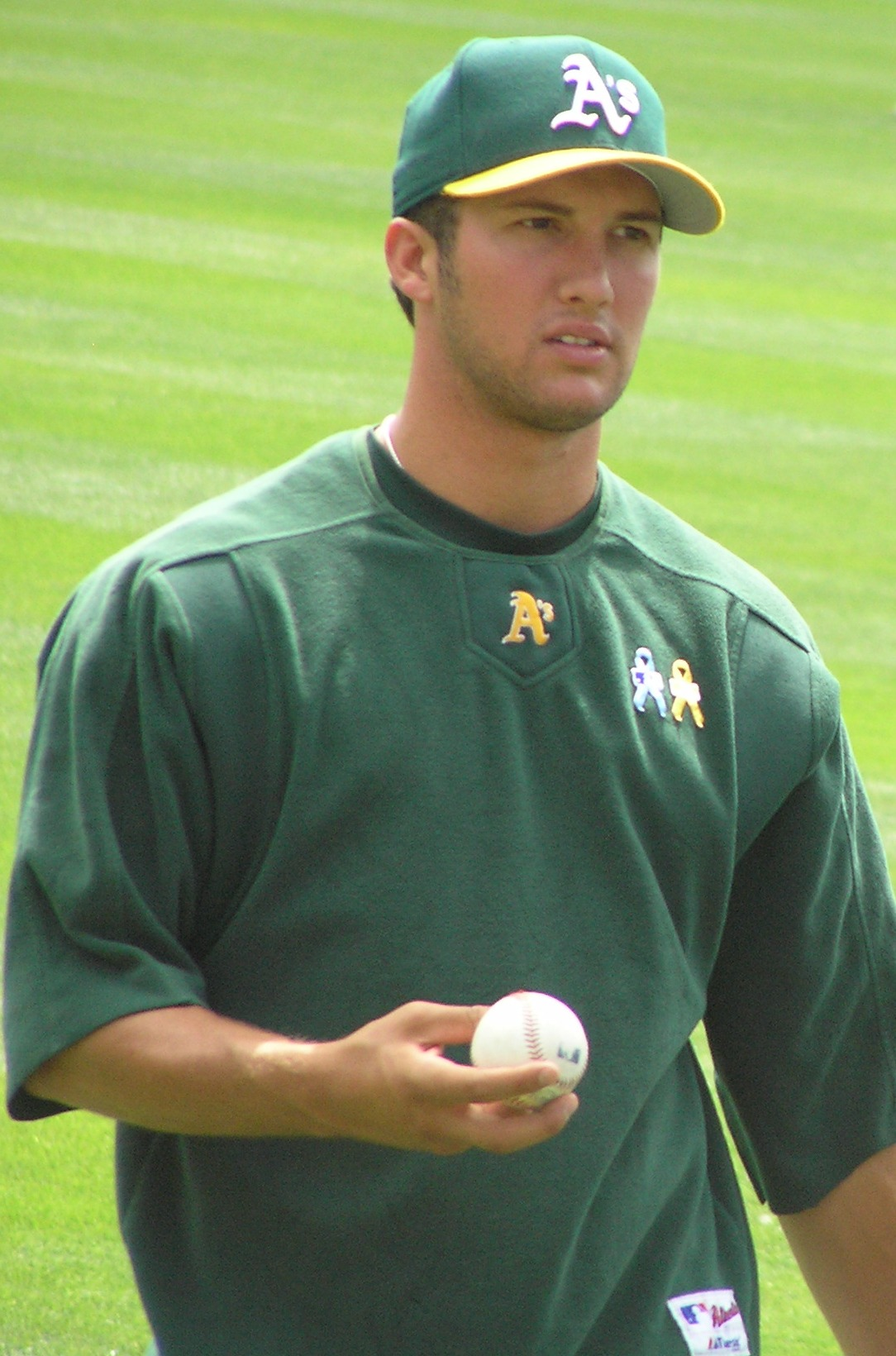
Huston Street (2004) is one of four Athletics' first-round draft picks to win the Rookie of the Year Award.

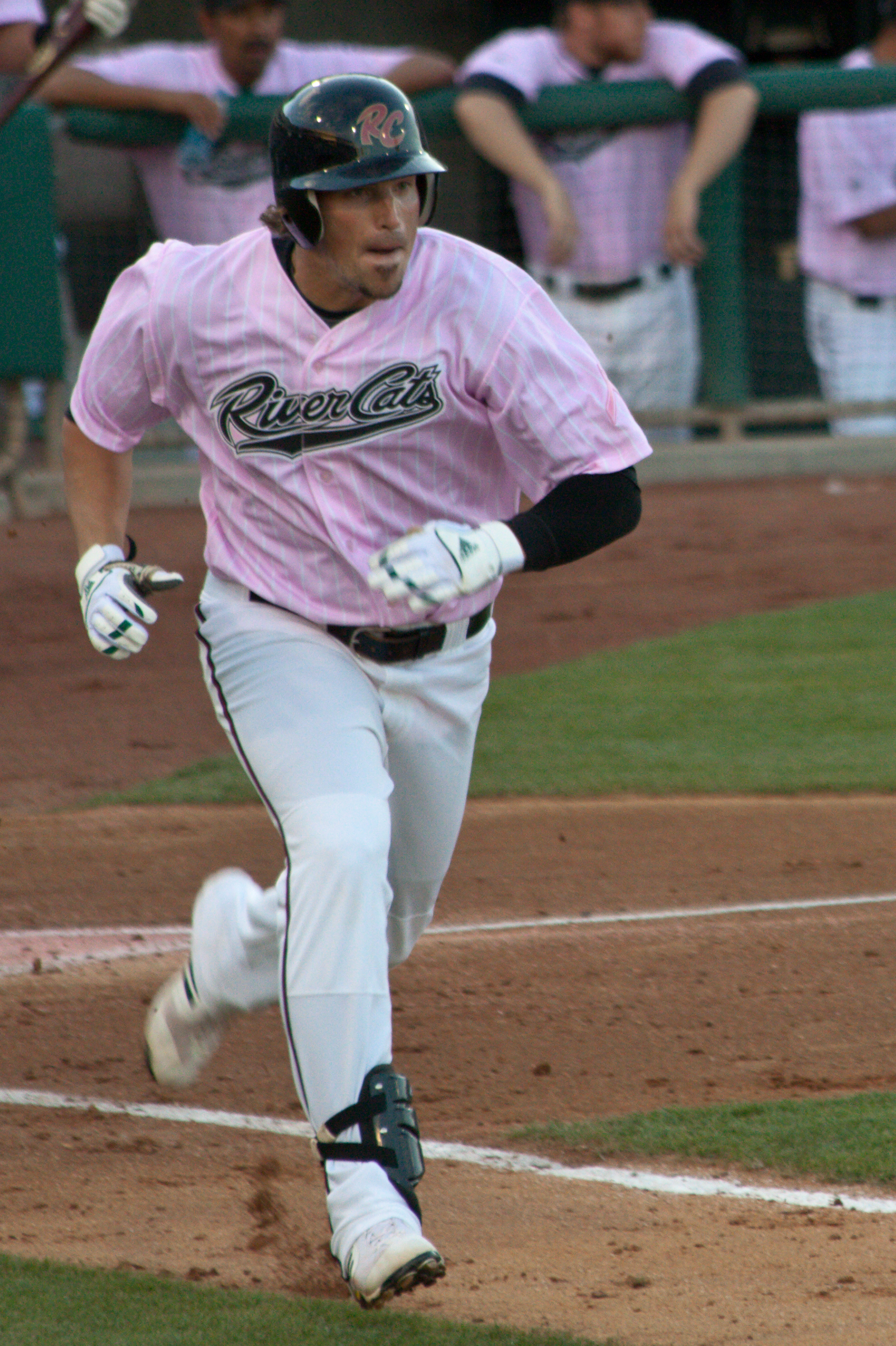
Travis Buck (2005) is the third player the Athletics have drafted in the first round from Arizona State University, the first since they did so back-to-back in the first two years of the draft.

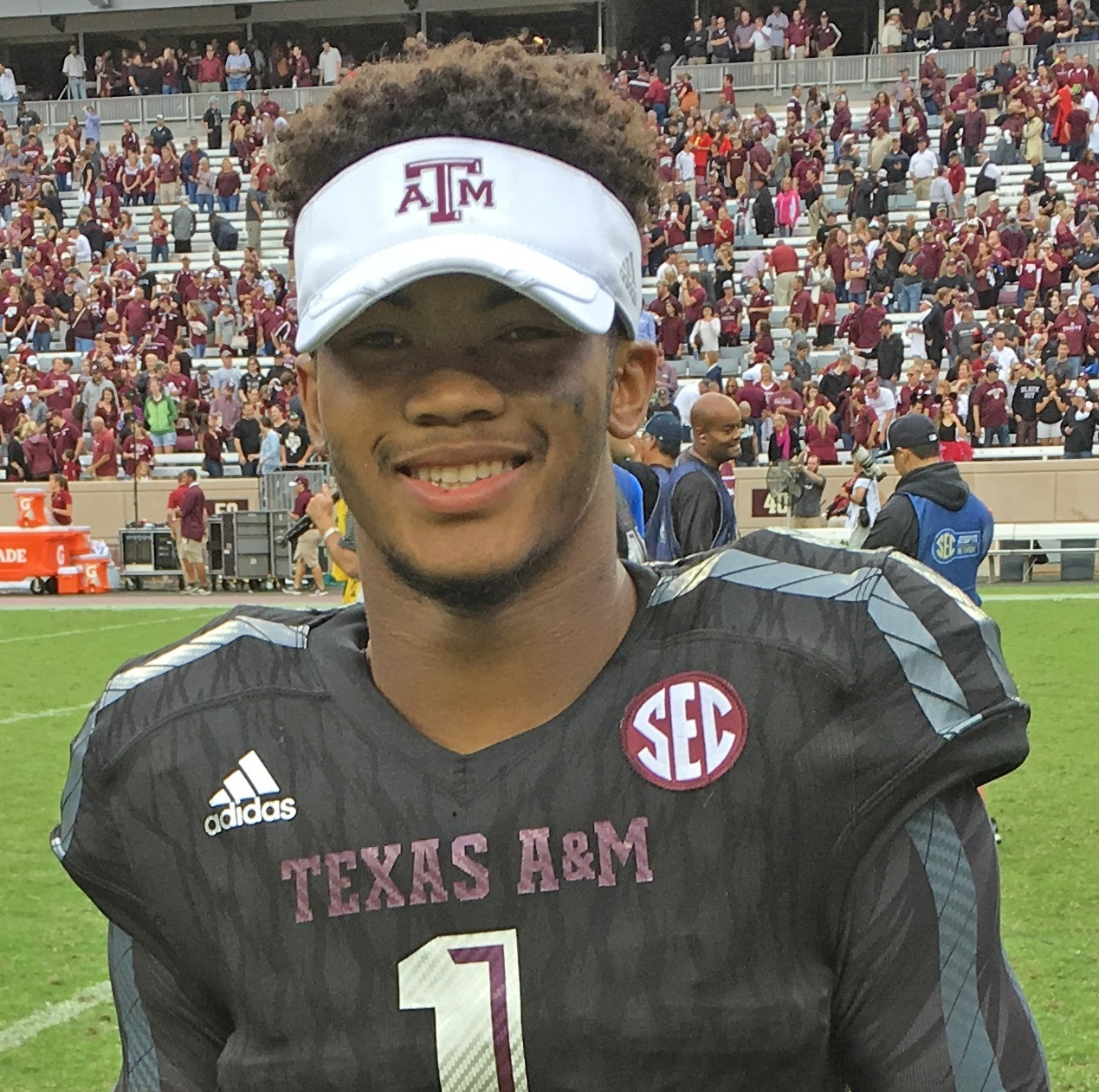
Kyler Murray (2018) signed a contract with the Athletics but chose not to play professional baseball.

Year	Name	Position	School (location)	Pick	Ref
1965	Rick Monday	Outfielder	Arizona State University (Tempe, Arizona)	1	
1966	Reggie Jackson† '72, '73, '74	Outfielder	Arizona State University (Tempe, Arizona)	2	
1967	Brian Bickerton	Left-handed pitcher	Santana High School (Santee, California)	7	
1968	Pete Broberg*	Right-handed pitcher	Palm Beach High School (Palm Beach, Florida)	2	
1969	Don Stanhouse	Right-handed pitcher	DuQuoin High School (DuQuoin, Illinois)	9	
1970	Dan Ford	Outfielder	Fremont High School (Los Angeles, California)	18	
1971	William Daniels	Right-handed pitcher	Mackenzie High School (Detroit, Michigan)	17	
1972	Chet Lemon	Shortstop	Fremont High School (Los Angeles, California)	22	
1973	Randy Scarbery	Right-handed pitcher	University of Southern California (Los Angeles, California)	23	
1974	Jerry Johnson	Catcher	McCallum High School (Austin, Texas)	22	
1975	Bruce Robinson	Catcher	Stanford University (Stanford, California)	21	
1976	Thomas Sullivan	Right-handed pitcher	Garfield High School (Woodbridge, Virginia)	24	
1977	Craig Harris	Right-handed pitcher	Buena High School (Sierra Vista, Arizona)	18	
1978	Mike Morgan	Right-handed pitcher	Valley High School (Las Vegas, Nevada)	4	
1978	Tim Conroy	Left-handed pitcher	Gateway Senior High School (Monroeville, Pennsylvania)	20^{[a]}	
1979	Juan Bustabad*	Shortstop	Miami Lakes High School (Hialeah, Florida)	5	
1979	Mike Stenhouse*	Outfielder	Harvard University (Cambridge, Massachusetts)	26^{[b]}	
1980	Mike King	Left-handed pitcher	Morningside College (Sioux City, Iowa)	4	
1981	Tim Pyznarski	Third baseman	Eastern Illinois University (Charleston, Illinois)	15	
1982	no first-round pick^{[c]}				
1983	Stan Hilton	Right-handed pitcher	Baylor University (Waco, Texas)	5	
1984	Mark McGwire '89	First baseman	University of Southern California (Los Angeles, California)	10	
1985	Walt Weiss '89	Shortstop	University of North Carolina at Chapel Hill (Chapel Hill, North Carolina)	11	
1986	Scott Hemond	Catcher	University of South Florida (Tampa, Florida)	12	
1987	Lee Tinsley	Outfielder	Shelby County High School (Shelbyville, Kentucky)	11	
1988	Stan Royer	Catcher	Eastern Illinois University (Charleston, Illinois)	16	
1989	no first-round pick^{[d]}				
1990	Todd Van Poppel	Right-handed pitcher	Martin High School (Arlington, Texas)	14^{[e]}	
1990	Don Peters	Right-handed pitcher	St. Francis College (Joliet, Illinois)	26	
1990	David Zancanaro	Left-handed pitcher	University of California, Los Angeles (Los Angeles, California)	34^{§}^{[f]}	
1990	Kirk Dressendorfer	Right-handed pitcher	University of Texas at Austin (Austin, Texas)	36^{§}^{[g]}	
1991	Brent Gates	Shortstop	University of Minnesota (Minneapolis, Minnesota)	26	
1991	Mike Rossiter	Right-handed pitcher	Burrough High School (Burbank, California)	38^{§}^{[h]}	
1992	Benji Grigsby	Right-handed pitcher	San Diego State University (San Diego, California)	20	
1993	John Wasdin	Right-handed pitcher	Florida State University (Tallahassee, Florida)	25	
1993	Willie Adams	Right-handed pitcher	Stanford University (Stanford, California)	36^{§}^{[i]}	
1994	Ben Grieve	Outfielder	Martin High School (Arlington, Texas)	2	
1995	Ariel Prieto	Right-handed pitcher	Fajardo University (Santiago de Cuba, Cuba)	5	
1996	Eric Chavez	Third baseman	Mount Carmel High School (San Diego, California)	10	
1997	Chris Enochs	Right-handed pitcher	West Virginia University (Morgantown, West Virginia)	11	
1997	Eric DuBose	Left-handed pitcher	Mississippi State University (Mississippi State, Mississippi)	21^{[j]}	
1997	Nathan Haynes	Outfielder	Pinole Valley High School (Pinole, California)	32^{§}^{[k]}	
1997	Denny Wagner	Right-handed pitcher	Virginia Polytechnic Institute and State University (Blacksburg, Virginia)	42^{§}^{[l]}	
1998	Mark Mulder	Left-handed pitcher	Michigan State University (East Lansing, Michigan)	2	
1999	Barry Zito	Left-handed pitcher	University of Southern California (Los Angeles, California)	9	
2000	no first-round pick^{[m]}				
2001	Bobby Crosby	Shortstop	California State University, Long Beach (Long Beach, California)	25	
2001	Jeremy Bonderman	Right-handed pitcher	Pasco High School (Pasco, Washington)	26^{[n]}	
2001	John Rheinecker	Left-handed pitcher	Southwest Missouri State University (Note: Known as Missouri State University since 2005.) (Springfield, Missouri)	37^{§}^{[o]}	
2002	Nick Swisher	First baseman	Ohio State University (Columbus, Ohio)	16^{[p]}	
2002	Joe Blanton	Right-handed pitcher	University of Kentucky (Lexington, Kentucky)	24^{[q]}	
2002	John McCurdy	Shortstop	University of Maryland, College Park (College Park, Maryland)	26	
2002	Ben Fritz	Right-handed pitcher	California State University, Fresno (Fresno, California)	30^{[r]}	
2002	Jeremy Brown	Catcher	University of Alabama (Tuscaloosa, Alabama)	35^{§}^{[s]}	
2002	Stephen Obenchain	Right-handed pitcher	University of Evansville (Evansville, Indiana)	37^{§}^{[t]}	
2002	Mark Teahen	Third baseman	Saint Mary's College of California (Moraga, California)	39^{§}^{[u]}	
2003	Bradley Sullivan	Right-handed pitcher	University of Houston (Houston, Texas)	25	
2003	Brian Snyder	Third baseman	Stetson University (DeLand, Florida)	26^{[v]}	
2003	Omar Quintanilla	Shortstop	University of Texas at Austin (Austin, Texas)	33^{§}^{[w]}	
2004	Landon Powell	Catcher	University of South Carolina (Columbia, South Carolina)	24^{[x]}	
2004	Richard Robnett	Outfielder	California State University, Fresno (Fresno, California)	26	
2004	Danny Putnam	Outfielder	Stanford University (Stanford, California)	36^{§}^{[y]}	
2004	Huston Street	Right-handed pitcher	University of Texas at Austin (Austin, Texas)	40^{§}^{[z]}	
2005	Cliff Pennington	Shortstop	Texas A&M University (College Station, Texas)	21	
2005	Travis Buck	Outfielder	Arizona State University (Tempe, Arizona)	36^{§}^{[aa]}	
2006	no first-round pick^{[ab]}				
2007	James Simmons	Right-handed pitcher	University of California, Riverside (Riverside, California)	26	
2007	Sean Doolittle	First baseman	University of Virginia (Charlottesville, Virginia)	41^{§}^{[ac]}	
2007	Corey Brown	Outfielder	Oklahoma State University–Stillwater (Stillwater, Oklahoma)	59^{§}^{[ad]}	
2008	Jemile Weeks	Second baseman	University of Miami (Coral Gables, Florida)	12	
2009	Grant Green	Shortstop	University of Southern California (Los Angeles, California)	13	
2010	Michael Choice	Center fielder	University of Texas at Arlington (Arlington, Texas)	10	
2011	Sonny Gray	Right-handed pitcher	Vanderbilt University (Nashville, Tennessee)	18	
2012	Addison Russell	Shortstop	Pace High School (Pace, Florida)	11	
2012	Daniel Robertson	Shortstop	Upland High School (Upland, California)	34^{§}^{[ae]}	
2012	Matt Olson	First baseman	Parkview High School (Lilburn, Georgia)	47^{§}^{[af]}	
2013	Billy McKinney	Outfielder	Plano West Senior High School (Plano, Texas)	24	
2014	Matt Chapman	Third baseman	California State University, Fullerton (Fullerton, California)	25	
2015	Richie Martin	Shortstop	University of Florida (Gainesville, Florida)	20	
2016	A. J. Puk	Left-handed pitcher	University of Florida (Gainesville, Florida)	6	
2016	Daulton Jefferies	Right-handed pitcher	University of California, Berkeley (Berkeley, California)	37^{§}^{[ag]}	
2017	Austin Beck	Outfielder	North Davidson High School (Lexington, North Carolina)	6	
2017	Kevin Merrell	Shortstop	University of South Florida (Tampa, Florida)	33^{§}^{[ah]}	
2018	Kyler Murray	Outfielder	University of Oklahoma (Norman, Oklahoma)	9	
2019	Logan Davidson	Shortstop	Clemson University (Clemson, South Carolina)	29	
2020	Tyler Soderstrom	Catcher	Turlock High School (Turlock, California)	26	
2021	Maxwell Muncy	Shortstop	Thousand Oaks High School (Thousand Oaks, California)	25	
2022	Daniel Susac	Catcher	University of Arizona (Tucson, Arizona)	19	
2023	Jacob Wilson	Shortstop	Grand Canyon University (Phoenix, Arizona)	6	
2024	Nick Kurtz	First baseman	Wake Forest Demon Deacons baseball (Winston-Salem, North Carolina)	4	
2025	Jamie Arnold	left-handed Pitcher	Florida State Seminoles baseball (Tallahassee, Florida)	11	
2026	Drew Burress	Outfielder	Georgia Tech Yellow Jackets baseball (Atlanta, Georgia)	8	

== See also ==
- Oakland Athletics minor league players

== Footnotes ==
- ^{V} Through the 2012 draft, free agents were evaluated by the Elias Sports Bureau and rated "Type A", "Type B", or not compensation-eligible. If a team offered arbitration to a player but that player refused and subsequently signed with another team, the original team was able to receive additional draft picks. If a "Type A" free agent left in this way, his previous team received a supplemental pick and a compensatory pick from the team with which he signed. If a "Type B" free agent left in this way, his previous team received only a supplemental pick. Since the 2013 draft, free agents are no longer classified by type; instead, compensatory picks are only awarded if the team offered its free agent a contract worth at least the average of the 125 current richest MLB contracts. However, if the free agent's last team acquired the player in a trade during the last year of his contract, it is ineligible to receive compensatory picks for that player.
- ^{a} The Athletics gained a compensatory first-round pick in 1978 from the Texas Rangers as compensation for losing free agent Mike Jorgensen.
- ^{b} The Athletics gained a compensatory first-round pick in 1979 from the Boston Red Sox as compensation for losing free agent Steve Renko.
- ^{c} The Athletics lost their first-round pick in 1982 to the Boston Red Sox as compensation for signing free agent Joe Rudi.
- ^{d} The Athletics lost their first-round pick in 1989 to the Seattle Mariners as compensation for signing free agent Mike Moore.
- ^{e} The Athletics gained a compensatory first-round pick in 1990 from the Milwaukee Brewers as compensation for losing free agent Dave Parker.
- ^{f} The Athletics gained a supplemental first-round pick in 1990 for losing free agent Storm Davis.
- ^{g} The Athletics gained a supplemental first-round pick in 1990 for losing free agent Dave Parker.
- ^{h} The Athletics gained a supplemental first-round pick in 1991 for losing free agent Willie McGee.
- ^{i} The Athletics gained a supplemental first-round pick in 1993 for losing free agent Dave Stewart.
- ^{j} The Athletics gained a compensatory first-round pick in 1997 from the Baltimore Orioles as compensation for losing free agent Mike Bordick.
- ^{k} The Athletics gained a supplemental first-round pick in 1997 for losing free agent Mike Bordick.
- ^{l} The Athletics gained a supplemental first-round pick in 1997 for losing free agent Mike Bordick.
- ^{m} The Athletics lost their first-round pick in 2000 to the Los Angeles Angels of Anaheim as compensation for signing free agent Mike Magnante.
- ^{n} The Athletics gained a compensatory first-round pick in 2001 from the New York Mets as compensation for losing free agent Kevin Appier.
- ^{o} The Athletics gained a supplemental first-round pick in 2001 for losing free agent Kevin Appier.
- ^{p} The Athletics gained a compensatory first-round pick in 2002 from the Boston Red Sox as compensation for losing free agent Johnny Damon.
- ^{q} The Athletics gained a compensatory first-round pick in 2002 from the New York Yankees as compensation for losing free agent Jason Giambi.
- ^{r} The Athletics gained a compensatory first-round pick in 2002 from the St. Louis Cardinals as compensation for losing free agent Jason Isringhausen.
- ^{s} The Athletics gained a supplemental first-round pick in 2002 for losing free agent Jason Giambi.
- ^{t} The Athletics gained a supplemental first-round pick in 2002 for losing free agent Jason Isringhausen.
- ^{u} The Athletics gained a supplemental first-round pick in 2002 for losing free agent Johnny Damon.
- ^{v} The Athletics gained a compensatory first-round pick in 2003 from the San Francisco Giants as compensation for losing free agent Ray Durham.
- ^{w} The Athletics gained a supplemental first-round pick in 2003 for losing free agent Ray Durham.
- ^{x} The Athletics gained a compensatory first-round pick in 2004 from the Boston Red Sox as compensation for losing free agent Keith Foulke.
- ^{y} The Athletics gained a supplemental first-round pick in 2004 for losing free agent Keith Foulke.
- ^{z} The Athletics gained a supplemental first-round pick in 2004 for losing free agent Miguel Tejada.
- ^{aa} The Athletics gained a supplemental first-round pick in 2005 for losing free agent Damian Miller.
- ^{ab} The Athletics lost their first-round pick in 2006 to the Washington Nationals as compensation for losing free agent Esteban Loaiza.
- ^{ac} The Athletics gained a supplemental first-round pick in 2007 for losing free agent Frank Thomas.
- ^{ad} The Athletics gained a supplemental first-round pick in 2007 for losing free agent Barry Zito.
- ^{ae} The Athletics gained a supplemental first-round pick in 2007 for losing free agent Josh Willingham.
- ^{af} The Athletics gained a supplemental first-round pick in 2007 for losing free agent David DeJesus.
- ^{ag} The Athletics gained a supplemental first-round pick in 2016 in Competitive Balance Round A.
- ^{ah} The Athletics gained a supplemental first-round pick in 2017 in Competitive Balance Round A.
