= German American Bank Field at Charles H. Braun Stadium =

Baseball venue in Evansville, Indiana, US

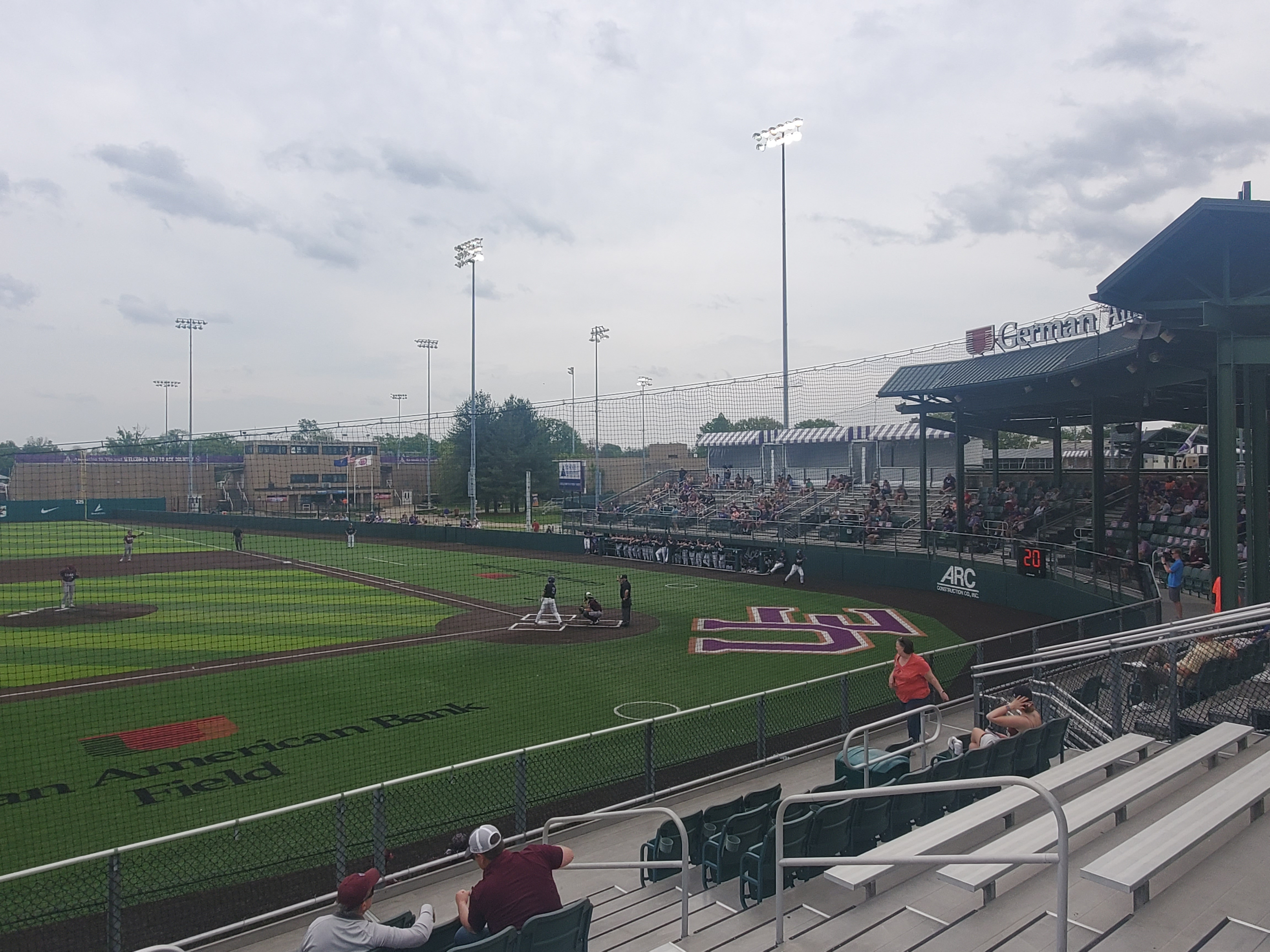
- Interactive map of German American Bank Field at Charles H. Braun Stadium
- Former names: Charles H. Braun Stadium (1999–2019)
- Location: South Rotherwood Avenue, Evansville, Indiana, US
- Coordinates: 37.975613°N 87.533636°W
- Owner: University of Evansville
- Operator: University of Evansville
- Capacity: 1,200
- Surface: Natural grass (1999–2019); AstroTurf (2020–present)
- Scoreboard: Electronic
- Field size: Left field – 330 ft. Center field – 400 ft. Right field – 330 ft.

Construction
- Opened: 1999
- Renovated: 2019
- Years active: 1999–present

Tenants
- Evansville Purple Aces baseball (NCAA) (1999–present)

German American Bank Field at Charles H. Braun Stadium is a ballpark in the midwestern United States, on the campus of the University of Evansville in Evansville, Indiana. It is the home field of the Evansville Purple Aces baseball team of the Missouri Valley Conference (MVC).

The stadium was opened in 1999 and named after Charles H. Braun, a businessman who played American football, basketball, and baseball for Evansville Memorial High School, a block away from UE's campus. Braun died in 1998. In 2019, the stadium underwent renovations to make the field AstroTurf while adding other additions to the dugouts and scoreboards. The field was then named after the German American Bank due to their large involvement in the renovations.

With a seating capacity of 1,200, it is currently tied for the fifth-largest in the Missouri Valley Conference.

Before Braun Stadium's opening in 1999, Evansville played at Bosse Field from 1985 to 1998.

== See also ==
- List of NCAA Division I baseball venues
