= Jim Brownlee =

American baseball coach

Playing career
- 1967–1970: Illinois State

Coaching career (HC unless noted)
- 1980–2002: Evansville
- 2003–2009: Illinois State
- 2013: Iowa (assistant)

Head coaching record
- Overall: 854–817–5

Jim Brownlee in an American college baseball coach, who served as head coach at Evansville for 23 seasons and Illinois State for 7 seasons. He also served as an assistant at Iowa for one year.

He coached his son Ryan Brownlee at Evansville, and later served on the same staff with him at Evansville.

Brownlee recorded over 800 wins in his 30 year head coaching career and earned conference coach of the year honors five times.
