= Eric Stamets =

American baseball player (born 1991)

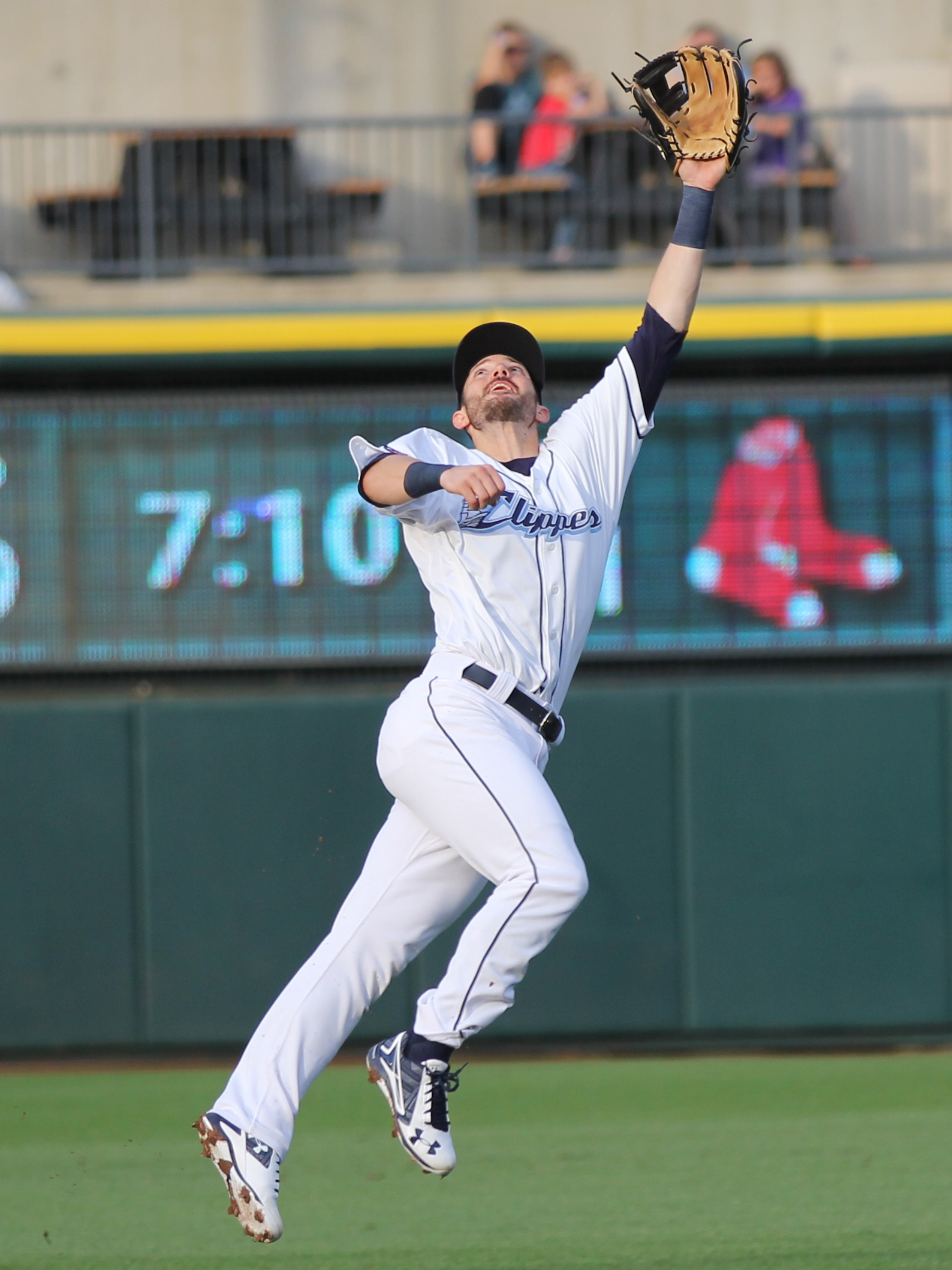
- Stamets with the Columbus Clippers in 2018
- Shortstop
- Born: September 25, 1991 (age 34); Dublin, Ohio, U.S.
- Batted: Right Threw: Right

MLB debut
- March 28, 2019, for the Cleveland Indians

Last MLB appearance
- April 15, 2019, for the Cleveland Indians

MLB statistics
- Batting average: .049
- Home runs: 0
- Runs batted in: 2
- Stats at Baseball Reference

Teams
- Cleveland Indians (2019)

Eric James Stamets (born September 25, 1991) is an American former professional baseball shortstop. He played one season in Major League Baseball (MLB) for the Cleveland Indians. He is currently the development coach for the Asheville Tourists.

== Professional career ==
=== Amateur ===
Stamets is a resident of Dublin, Ohio, where he attended Dublin Scioto High School. Stamets attended the University of Evansville and played college baseball for the Evansville Purple Aces. In 2010, his freshman year, he was named a Freshman All-American. In 2011, he played collegiate summer baseball with the Hyannis Harbor Hawks of the Cape Cod Baseball League and was named a league all-star. As a junior in 2012, he had a .316 batting average, which led the team, and was named the Missouri Valley Conference's defensive player of the year.

=== Los Angeles Angels of Anaheim ===
The Los Angeles Angels of Anaheim selected Stamets in the sixth round, with the 207th overall selection, of the 2012 MLB draft. The Angels assigned him to the Cedar Rapids Kernels of the Single–A Midwest League after he signed. He played for the Inland Empire 66ers of San Bernardino of the High–A California League in 2013. Stamets played for the Arkansas Travelers of the Double–A Texas League in 2014 and 2015.

=== Cleveland Indians ===
On July 28, 2015, the Angels traded Stamets to the Cleveland Indians for David Murphy. He played for the Akron RubberDucks of the Double–A Eastern League following the trade. The Indians invited Stamets to spring training in 2016. In 2016, Stamets played for Akron, batting .258 in 69 games, and the Columbus Clippers of the Triple–A International League, batting .164 in 22 games. He began the 2017 season with Akron and was promoted to Columbus, and he played in the Triple-A All-Star Game. He batted .259 with 16 home runs and 52 RBI in 116 games. The Indians added Stamets to their 40-man roster following the 2017 season. In 2018, he missed the first 25 games with a back injury.

Stamets made Cleveland's Opening Day roster in 2019, filling in at shortstop for Francisco Lindor, who started the season on the injured list. He made his major league debut on March 28, 2019. Stamets was designated for assignment on July 31. After clearing waivers, Stamets was outrighted to Triple–A on August 6. He elected free agency following the season on November 4.

=== Colorado Rockies ===
On November 12, 2019, Stamets signed a minor league contract, with an invitation to major league spring training, with the Colorado Rockies organization. He did not play in a game in 2020 due to the cancellation of the minor league season because of the COVID-19 pandemic. He re-signed with the Rockies on a new minor league contract on November 2, 2020.

In 2021, Stamets appeared in 40 games with the rookie-level Arizona Complex League Rockies and Triple-A Albuquerque Isotopes, hitting .168 with four home runs and nine RBI. On August 27, 2021, Stamets was released by the Rockies.

=== Toronto Blue Jays ===
On March 4, 2022, Stamets signed a minor league contract with the Toronto Blue Jays organization. He was released on August 13. On September 4, Stamets re-signed with Toronto on a new minor league contract. In 66 games for the Triple-A Buffalo Bisons, he batted .176/.279/.301 with 5 home runs, 17 RBI, and 7 stolen bases. He elected free agency following the season on November 10.

== Coaching career ==
=== Houston Astros ===
On February 23, 2023, Stamets was hired as the development coach for the Asheville Tourists, the High-A affiliate of the Houston Astros.

=== Cleveland Guardians ===
On February 4, 2026, Stamets was announced as the bench coach for the Lake County Captains, the High-A affiliate of the Cleveland Guardians.
