= Rob Maurer =

American baseball player (1967–2026)

- First baseman
- Born: January 7, 1967; Evansville, Indiana, U.S.
- Died: January 21, 2026 (aged 59)
- Batted: Left Threw: Left

MLB debut
- September 8, 1991, for the Texas Rangers

Last MLB appearance
- October 4, 1992, for the Texas Rangers

MLB statistics
- Batting average: .120
- Home runs: 0
- Runs batted in: 3
- Stats at Baseball Reference

Teams
- Texas Rangers (1991–1992)

Robert John Maurer (January 7, 1967 – January 21, 2026) was an American professional baseball first baseman. He played in Major League Baseball (MLB) for the Texas Rangers.

== Career ==
Maurer attended Mater Dei High School in Evansville, Indiana, and the University of Evansville, where he played for the Evansville Purple Aces baseball team.

He was drafted by the Texas Rangers in the 6th round of the 1988 Major League Baseball draft. He appeared in 21 games for the Rangers wearing #39 during the 1991 and 1992 MLB seasons and retired from professional baseball after the 1994 season.

== Death ==
Maurer died on January 21, 2026, at the age of 59.
